= Chiaki Takahashi =

Japanese voice actress, singer and gravure idol

- たかはし 智秋
- Born: May 8, 1977 (age 49); Yokohama, Kanagawa Prefecture, Japan
- Occupations: Voice actress; singer; model
- Years active: 1997–present
- Height: 160 cm (5 ft 3 in)
- Website: chiaking58.com

Chiaki Takahashi (たかはし 智秋 (formerly 高橋 千晶), Takahashi Chiaki; born May 8, 1977) is a Japanese voice actress, singer and gravure idol. Her hometown is Yokohama, Japan. On October 10, 2000, she changed the kanji lettering of her name, though the pronunciation remains the same. She was a member of the J-pop group Aice^{5} as well. Currently under Avex Management Inc. and LMP Promotion, she was previously represented by Aoni Production and Arts Vision. In 2011, she made her solo musical debut with the single "Kon'ya wa Chupa♡Riko" under Avex.

== Filmography ==
=== Television animation ===
2000

- Pilot Candidate – Repairer A

2001

- Angelic Layer – shop worker (ep 1)
- Hikaru no Go – student (ep 7)
- InuYasha – Princess (ep 22); Villager (Ep 18)
- Kokoro Library – Kaji's Angel (ep 5)
- A Little Snow Fairy Sugar – Dove
- The Daichis - Earth Defence Family – announcer (ep 6); child B (ep 7); child C (ep 5); girl C (ep 1); Sanae's voice (ep 8); student (ep 12); student C (ep 4); student G (ep 2)

2002

- Aquarian Age: Sign for Evolution – girl (ep 5)
- Cosplay Complex – Reika Aoshima
- Fortune Dogs – Ai-chan
- Full Metal Panic! – Ai Tanabe (eps 1 – 2, 4, 8); announcer (ep 14); Shiori Kudou (eps 3, 5, 7, 9)
- Mao-chan – Mio Nanba; Officer (Eps 2, 5)
- Mirage of Blaze – Wakamono (Ep 6)
- Panyo Panyo Di Gi Charat – Girl 3

2003

- Kaleido Star – Female Customer
- Rumbling Hearts – Mitsuki Hayase – as Tomoko Ishibashi

2004

- Akane Maniax – Mitsuki Hayase
- Daphne in the Brilliant Blue – Hostess; Mitzue Takahashi
- Final Approach – Emiho Mutsu
- Futakoi – Ai Momoi; Billy
- Gantz – Reporter (ep 4)

2005

- Futakoi Alternative – Ai Momoi
- Magical Kanan – Calendula
- Zoids Genesis – A Kan (eps 16–17)

2006

- Otome wa Boku ni Koishiteru – Takako Itsukushima
- Fushigiboshi no Futagohime Gyu! – Calore

2007

- School Days – Nanami Kanroji

2008

- Chaos;Head – Yua Kusunoki
- Kaze no Stigma – Catherine McDonald
- Yatterman 2008 – Omotchama

2009

- Bleach – Haineko

2010

- Pocket Monsters: Best Wishes! – Junsar, Satoshi's Gamagaru

2011

- Rio: Rainbow Gate! – Rina Tachibana
- The Idolm@ster (anime) – Azusa Miura
- Hoshizora e Kakaru Hashi – Tsumugi Tōdō
- We Without Wings – Under the Innocent Sky – Kinako Mochizuki

2012

- Pocket Monsters: Best Wishes! Season 2 – Junsar, Satoshi's Gamagaru

2013

- Kill la Kill – Omiko Hakodate (Ep. 2)
- Pocket Monsters: Best Wishes! Season 2: Episode N – Junsar, Musashi's Pururill
- Pocket Monsters: Best Wishes! Season 2: Decolora Adventure – Junsar, Satoshi's Gamagaru, Musashi's Pururill
- Wanna Be the Strongest in the World – Jackal Tojo
- Puchimas! Petit Idolmaster – Azusa Miura and Miurasan
- BlazBlue: Alter Memory – Litchi Faye Ling

2014

- Gundam Reconguista in G – Mashner Hume
- Hanayamata – Jennifer N. Fountainstand (Hana's mother)
- Momo Kyun Sword – Enki
- Terra Formars – Kanako Sanjō

2015

- Yatterman Night – Oda-sama
- Gintama – Kondo Isao (Female)
- Bikini Warriors – Dark Elf

2016

- Nobunaga no Shinobi – Kichō
- Pretty Guardian Sailor Moon Crystal Season III – Eudial

2017

- Fairy Tail: Dragon Cry – Swan
- Garo: Vanishing Line – Waitress Chiaki
- Seven Mortal Sins – Lust Demon Lord Asmodeus

2019

- Cautious Hero: The Hero Is Overpowered but Overly Cautious – Chaos Machina

2020

- The Island of Giant Insects – Misuzu Jinno

2020-22

- Princess Connect! Re:Dive – Christina / Christina Morgan

2021

- Dragon Goes House-Hunting – Thief
- Mother of the Goddess' Dormitory – Mineru Wachi
- The World's Finest Assassin Gets Reincarnated in Another World as an Aristocrat – Esri

2023

- TenPuru – Kiki

2024

- Dandadan – Queen-sensei

Other appearances (merge these with above list)

- Crayon Shin-chan – female customer; female high school student
- Hellsing Ultimate – Jessica
- Knight Hunters Eternity (ep 7)
- You're Under Arrest – primary school student (ep 19)

=== Theatrical animation ===
2017

- Fairy Tail: Dragon Cry – Swan

2020

- The Island of Giant Insects – Mirei Jinno

=== Video games ===
2001

- Kimi ga Nozomu Eien – Mitsuki Hayase

2002

- Akane Maniax – Mitsuki Hayase

2003

- Quiz Magic Academy – Amelia
- The Legend of Zelda: The Wind Waker – Medli (Vocal effects, no dialogue)

2005

- School Days – Nanami Kanroji (under the name of Mio Fujimura)
- Swan Song – Yuka Sasaki (under the name of Yuka Sasaki)

2006

- I/O – Ishtar
- Muv-Luv Alternative – Mitsuki Hayase
- Dawn of Mana – Jinn

2007

- The Idolmaster – Azusa Miura

2008

- BlazBlue: Calamity Trigger – Litchi Faye Ling
- Chaos;Head – Yua Kusunoki
- The Idolmaster Live For You! – Azusa Miura
- Vanguard Princess – Hilda Rize

2009

- BlazBlue: Continuum Shift – Litchi Faye Ling
- Chaos;Head Noah – Yua Kusunoki
- The Idolmaster SP – Azusa Miura

2010

- Chaos;Head Love Chu Chu! – Yua Kusunoki
- Hyperdimension Neptunia – Magiquone

2011

- Hyperdimension Neptunia Mk2 – Magic The Hard
- The Idolmaster 2 – Azusa Miura

2012

- BlazBlue: Chronophantasma – Litchi Faye Ling
- Twisted Metal – Doll Face
- Hyperdimension Neptunia Victory – Arfoire
- The Idolmaster Shiny Festa – Azusa Miura
- PlayStation All-Stars Battle Royale – Doll Face

2013

- Bravely Default – Holly Whyte
- Hyperdimension Neptunia Re;birth1 – Arfoire

2014

- The Idolmaster One For All – Azusa Miura
- Hyperdimension Neptunia Re;birth2: Sisters Generation – Magic The Hard
- Hyperdevotion Noire: Goddess Black Heart, Hyperdimension Neptunia Re;birth3: V Generation – Arfoire

2015

- School of Rangarok – Lucy
- Megadimension Neptunia VII – Arfoire
- BlazBlue: Central Fiction – Litchi Faye Ling

2016

- Breath of Fire 6 – Elena
- Granblue Fantasy – Catherine, Stheno
- The Idolmaster Platinum Stars – Azusa Miura

2017

- Cyberdimension Neptunia: 4 Goddesses Online – Arfoire, Mastermind/Mine
- Azur Lane – Houshou, Azusa Miura
- The Idolmaster Million Live!: Theater Days – Azusa Miura
- The Idolmaster Stella Stage – Azusa Miura

2018

- SNK Heroines: Tag Team Frenzy – Terry Bogard
- Dragalia Lost – Verica
- Princess Connect! Re:Dive – Christina Morgan

2020

- Girls' Frontline – Barrett M82A1, Colt Python
- Genshin Impact – Xinyan
- Ash Arms – P-61A Black Widow

2021

- Magia Record – Isabeau de Bavière, Queen of France
- The Idolmaster Starlit Season – Azusa Miura

2022

- Counter:Side – Murasame Shion (Lee Jisoo)
- Path to Nowhere – Iron

2023

- Guardian Tales – No.9 Miss Chrom

=== Dubbing roles ===
==== Live-action ====
- Blue Crush – Penny Chadwick (Mika Boorem)
- Deadwater Fell – Sandra McKay (Lisa McGrillis)
- Empire – Rhonda Lyon (Kaitlin Doubleday)
- Euphoria – Maddy Perez (Alexa Demie)
- Frank Herbert's Children of Dune – Ghanima Atreides (Jessica Brooks)
- Gossip Girl (2007) – Gossip Girl (Kristen Bell), Cyndi Lauper
- Gossip Girl (2021) – Gossip Girl (Kristen Bell)
- Hobbs & Shaw – Madam M (Eiza González)
- Jurassic World – Vivian (Lauren Lapkus)
- Mad Max: Fury Road – The Splendid Angharad (Rosie Huntington-Whiteley)
- Mojin: The Lost Legend – Ding Sitian (Angelababy)
- Mr. Robot – Darlene Alderson (Carly Chaikin)
- Princess Hours – Min Hyo-rin (Song Ji-hyo)
- Smash – Ivy Lynn (Megan Hilty)
- Snowden – Lindsay Mills (Shailene Woodley)
- Yo soy Betty, la fea – Aura María Fuentes (Stefania Gómez)

==== Animation ====
- Angel's Friends (Kabale)
- The Cuphead Show! (Cala Maria)
- Rugrats (Angelica Pickles)
- Superman: The Animated Series (Supergirl)
- The Spooktacular New Adventures of Casper (Kat Harvey) (2003 Cartoon Network version)
