= The Idolmaster Movie: Beyond the Brilliant Future! =

2014 Japanese animated film by Atsushi Nishigori

- Theatrical release poster
- Kanji: THE IDOLM@STER MOVIE 輝きの向こう側へ！
- Revised Hepburn: The Idolmaster Movie: Kagayaki no Mukōgawa e!
- Directed by: Atsushi Nishigori
- Screenplay by: Atsushi Nishigori; Tatsuya Takahashi
- Based on: The Idolmaster by Namco Bandai Games
- Produced by: Yozo Sakagami; Hironori Toba; Yasuhiro Yamaguchi; Tomohiro Kashiwaya
- Starring: Eriko Nakamura; Akiko Hasegawa; Asami Imai; Mayako Nigo; Azumi Asakura; Hiromi Hirata; Asami Shimoda; Rie Kugimiya; Chiaki Takahashi; Yumi Hara; Manami Numakura; Naomi Wakabayashi; Juri Takita; Kenji Akabane; Hōchū Ōtsuka
- Cinematography: Hitoshi Tamura; Shinya Katō
- Edited by: Akinori Mishima
- Music by: Ryuuichi Takada
- Production company: A-1 Pictures
- Distributed by: Aniplex
- Release date: January 25, 2014
- Running time: 121 minutes
- Country: Japan
- Language: Japanese
- Box office: US$7.48 million

The Idolmaster Movie: Beyond the Brilliant Future!, (Note: Japanese: THE IDOLM@STER MOVIE 輝きの向こう側へ！, Hepburn: The Idolmaster Movie: Kagayaki no Mukōgawa e!; lit. 'The Idolmaster Movie: To the Glittering Other Side!' or 'The Idolmaster Movie: To the Glittering Side!') stylized as THE IDOLM@STER MOVIE: Beyond the Brilliant Future!, is a 2014 Japanese animated film based on The Idolmaster franchise and a sequel to The Idolmaster (2011). Produced by A-1 Pictures and distributed by Aniplex, the film is directed by Atsushi Nishigori from a script he wrote with Tatsuya Takahashi. The film follows Producer working with the idols of 765 Production for their first arena concert and inviting seven idols-in-training as their backup dancers.

Originally an original video animation film planned by Aniplex producer Hironori Toba by June 2012, the project was then changed into a feature film after Toba began working with Nishigori for the project by October. The production of the film was confirmed in February 2013, with the staff and cast of the anime series set to be returning. Additional cast were revealed in November 2013.

The Idolmaster Movie: Beyond the Brilliant Future! premiered in Japan on January 25, 2014. The film grossed over $7 million worldwide, and it received nominations at Newtype Anime Awards and Tokyo Anime Award Festival. A remastered version of the film's Blu-ray and DVD, subtitled VideoMaster Version, was released in Japan on September 19, 2014.

== Plot ==
Due to their continuous popularity, the idols of 765 Production are busy with their work, such as promoting their film The Sleeping Be@uty Movie, along with the news of Miki Hoshii being cast for a Hollywood film and Chihaya Kisaragi being invited for a recording session in New York City. The idols return to their office, where Producer announces their upcoming arena concert and a training camp where they can prepare for the concert. He also invites seven idols-in-training as their backup dancers and chooses Haruka Amami as the idol's leader. At the Wakasa Inn, 765 Pro idols meet the dancers Minako Satake, Nao Yokoyama, Yuriko Nanao, Shiho Kitazawa, Serika Hakozaki, Anna Mochizuki, and Kana Yabuki. The idols-in-training then experience vigorous rehearsals along with the idols. Following a visit from media for interviews and the final rehearsal, Haruka learns from Kana that she has inspired her to become an idol and autographs her panda plushie. Later, Producer announces leaving 765 Production temporarily for Hollywood to attend a business training to improve himself as a producer. The idols become saddened, but Haruka encourages them to make the concert successful for Producer's sake. Following the training camp, Producer invites the dancers to join the idols' miniconcerts to gain stage experience.

Kana trips and falls while dancing during Haruka, Chihaya, and Azusa Miura's miniconcert, resulting in the incident being sensationalized in a magazine. The backup dancers inform 765 Production about their stagnant rehearsals, while Haruka questions Kana's absence. Producer decides to have a joint rehearsals between the idols and the dancers. During their practice session, Anna informs Haruka that Kana is going to quit as an idol. Shiho insists on continuing with the rehearsal despite losing a member, but Haruka wants to know Kana's reason for giving up. Haruka manages to get in touch with Kana over the phone and discerns that she is forcing herself to quit. She motivates everybody to help her in finding Kana, during which they discover that she has gained weight due to stress eating and learn that this is the reason for her missing the rehearsals. The idols bring the dancers to their concert's venue, where Haruka gives a heartfelt speech. This encourages Kana to continue pursuing being an idol. On the day of the concert, the idols and the dancers deliver a successful performance. Sometime after the concert, the idols bid Producer farewell as he boards a plane and continue their work elsewhere. In a post-credits scene, a still image shows 765 Pro idols reuniting with Producer.

== Voice cast ==
- Eriko Nakamura as Haruka Amami
- Akiko Hasegawa as Miki Hoshii
- Asami Imai as Chihaya Kisaragi
- Mayako Nigo as Yayoi Takatsuki
- Azumi Asakura as Yukiho Hagiwara
- Hiromi Hirata as Makoto Kikuchi
- Asami Shimoda as Ami Futami and Mami Futami
- Rie Kugimiya as Iori Minase
- Chiaki Takahashi as Azusa Miura
- Yumi Hara as Takane Shijō
- Manami Numakura as Hibiki Ganaha
- Naomi Wakabayashi as Ritsuko Akizuki
- Juri Takita as Kotori Otonashi
- Kenji Akabane as Producer
- Hōchū Ōtsuka as President Takagi
- Ibuki Kido as Kana Yabuki
- Eri Ōzeki as Minako Satake
- Yui Watanabe as Nao Yokoyama
- Miku Itō as Yuriko Nanao
- Sora Amamiya as Shiho Kitazawa
- Shiina Natsukawa as Anna Mochizuki
- Momo Asakura as Serika Hakozaki
- Takuma Terashima as Tōma Amagase
- Daichi Kanbara as Hokuto Ijūin
- Yoshitsugu Matsuoka as Shōta Mitarai
- Mitsuaki Hoshino as Reporter Yoshizawa

== Production ==
Before the event commemorating the 7th anniversary of The Idolmaster franchise in June 2012, Aniplex producer Hironori Toba began talks to produce an original video animation (OVA) project. Toba began working with director Atsushi Nishigori about the project following the conclusion of The Idolmaster Shiny Festa in October 2012. It was intended to be a 60-minute OVA film but as "various ideas and elements" were incorporated with it, the project was changed into a theatrical film. In February 2013, the film had been confirmed to be in production, which was described as "a brand-new work telling a new story about the [765 Production] idols" while serving as a continuation of The Idolmaster (2011). Nishigori and Tatsuya Takahashi were also confirmed to be writing the film's script, with Nishigori directing it at A-1 Pictures as his first anime film, after previously working on the anime series. In addition to the staff, the cast from the anime series were set to reprise their voice roles from the anime series for the film. The full title of the film was revealed in April 2013. In November 2013, Eri Ōzeki, Ibuki Kido, Miku Itō, Momo Asakura, Shiina Natsukawa, Sora Amamiya, and Yui Watanabe were revealed to be voicing Minako Satake, Kana Yabuki, Yuriko Nanao, Serika Hakozaki, Anna Mochizuki, Shiho Kitazawa, and Nao Yokoyama, the characters first introduced in the mobile game The Idolmaster Million Live!, respectively. The inclusion of the Million Live! characters was suggested by The Idolmaster video game series director Akihiro Ishihara.

== Music ==
Ryuuichi Takada served as the composer for The Idolmaster Movie: Beyond the Brilliant Future!. In September 2013, the insert song for the film was revealed as "Ramune-Colored Youth" (ラムネ色青春, Ramune-iro Seishun). In November 2013, the main theme song "Masterpiece", (Note: Stylized as "M@STERPIECE") written by Yura and composed by Satoru Kōsaki, and the ending theme song "Rainbow-Colored Miracle" (虹色ミラクル, Nijiiro Mirakuru), written by Yuriko Mori and composed by Kyo, were revealed. Nippon Columbia released the opening theme song's single, which includes the coupling song "The Path You Choose" (君が選ぶ道, Kimi ga Erabu Michi), in Japan on January 29, 2014, and the film's original soundtrack on February 5. The insert song's single, which includes the coupling song "Prince in My Wallpaper" (待受けプリンス, Machiuke Purinsu), was released in Japan on June 18, 2014. The ending theme songs's single, which includes the coupling song "Fate of the World", was released in Japan on August 13, 2014; it was previously scheduled to be released on July 16.

The Idolmaster Movie: Original Soundtrack (CD)
No.	Title	Length
1.	"Ephemeral Dream"	0:53
2.	"What Lies Beneath the Cherry Blossoms"	0:38
3.	"Towards the Light"	2:17
4.	"Blue Wind"	1:58
5.	"Longing"	1:39
6.	"We're Forever... Right? (BGM Version)"	4:54
7.	"Beyond the Brilliant Future"	3:45
8.	"Brilliance"	1:55
9.	"Tension UP!"	2:01
10.	"In the Shadow of the Stage"	1:49
11.	"Battle Scene"	1:36
12.	"Daily Life of 765 Pro"	1:55
13.	"To Raise Idols!"	1:33
14.	"Idols and Their Friends..."	1:58
15.	"New Bond"	2:01
16.	"Expanding Dream"	1:56
17.	"Ryūgū Komachi Formation!"	1:43
18.	"Ready!! (BGM Version)"	2:35
19.	"Panic & High Tension"	1:23
20.	"Silhouette"	1:51
21.	"Pinch!"	1:48
22.	"To Intrigue and Trickery"	2:18
23.	"To My Fading Thoughts"	2:19
24.	"Loneliness"	2:05
25.	"Wavering Heart"	2:01
26.	"Haruka's Conflict (Long Version)"	3:06
27.	"Connected Thoughts"	1:43
28.	"Friends and Rivals"	1:58
29.	"In the Midst of Calm Days"	2:13
30.	"Change!!!! (BGM Version)"	2:22
31.	"Straight (BGM Version)"	2:52
32.	"Fate of the World (Movie Version)"	1:36
33.	"Ramune-Colored Youth (Movie Version)"	2:07
34.	"Go My Way!! (Short Version)"	2:03
35.	"Masterpiece (Short Version)"	2:11
36.	"Rainbow-Colored Miracle (Short Version)"	2:04
Total length:		75:06

== Marketing ==
The commemorative tickets for The Idolmaster Movie production announcement sold at Anime Contents Expo in March 2013 are bundled with a drama CD titled 765 Pro Hiring Explanation CD (765プロ入社説明CD) starring Ōtsuka as President, Akabane as Producer, and Takita as Kotori, in which President gives a message for aspiring producers and explains the wonders of 765 Production. The trailer for the film was released on December 28, 2013, which featured the opening theme song. Newtype, which released its February issue featuring Haruka drawn by Nishigori as the cover on January 10, 2014, collaborated with six book retailers (Animate, Gamers, Toranoana, Wonder Goo, Tsutaya, and Lawson) for the first time in the magazine's history to offer buyers special posters with different characters from the film that were assigned to each retailers. The magazine issue was sold out in 10 days following its release. A prologue volume of The Idolmaster manga series (listed as "Volume 0") created by Takahashi and The Idolmaster manga illustrator Mana, titled The Idolmaster Movie: Beyond the Brilliant Future! Signs, was given during the second week of the film's release. Its story takes place between the anime series and the film. The special edition of the manga's third volume, which was released on August 4, 2014, is bundled with a booklet titled The Idolmaster Movie: Beyond the Brilliant Future! 0+. (Note: 0+ is stylized as 0^{+}) It contains Signs as a chapter and a new 44-page chapter titled "The Idolmaster Movie: Beyond the Brilliant Future! Longing", which features the backup dancers' point of view during the training camp.

Promotional partners for the film included the T-shirt brand Beams; Lawson, which sold a limited advance ticket bundled with a drama CD titled The Idolmaster Lawson Original Drama Disk through Loppi. It details Haruka, Chihaya, Yukiho, and Takane promoting the arena concert during a radio show hosted by DJ Tetsuya Karukuchi; and Lotteria.

== Release ==
=== Theatrical ===
The Idolmaster Movie: Beyond the Brilliant Future! was released in Japan on January 25, 2014. The film was previously scheduled to be released in March 2014. During the stage greeting attended by Nakamura, Hara, Numakura, and Imai at Shinjuku Wald 9 in April 2014, an individual was reported to have seen the film 102 times. Japanese entertainment blog Hachima Kikō speculated the free The Idolmaster goods that came in every ticket purchase, which were being changed weekly throughout the film's theatrical run, were the reason behind the filmgoer's streak.

==== VideoMaster Version ====
Theatrical release poster for VideoMaster Version

The Idolmaster Movie: Beyond the Brilliant Future! ended its theatrical run on May 30, 2014. The upcoming home video release, which was first announced in the middle of that month, was "newly mastered" for the film's rerelease. The new version, subtitled VideoMaster Version (Note: Stylized as VideoM@ster Version) (VideoM@ster版, VideoMaster Han), was released in 40 theaters in Japan from September 19 to October 10, 2014.

=== Home media ===
The Idolmaster Movie: Beyond the Brilliant Future! was released on Blu-ray and DVD in Japan on October 8, 2014. Their limited editions are bundled with a drama CD titled Perfect Idol: The Movie, which features the encore part of the arena concert that is not seen in the film, and a mook titled The Idolmaster Movie Fan Book: Memorial Master & Ogi Star Memoris 2. (Note: Stylized as The Idolm@ster Movie Fan Book: Memorial M@ster & Ogi☆Star Memoris 2) The "Shiny Festa Anime Blu-ray Bundle Edition" is included with the three animated episodes in The Idolmaster Shiny Festa video game, the drama CD, and the mook.

The film was aired on Wowow on March 7 and April 6, 2015. The Idolmaster official YouTube channel streamed the film from August 19 to September 1, 2020.

== Reception ==
=== Box office ===
The Idolmaster Movie: Beyond the Brilliant Future! grossed $7.29 million in Japan and $180,904 in South Korea, for a worldwide total of $7.48 million.

The film earned ¥149.9 million (US$1.4 million) in its opening weekend in Japan, ranking fifth at the box office. It grossed ¥678.2 million (US$6.4 million) by the end of its theatrical run. VideoMaster Version added ¥95 million (US$892,462) to the overall box office.

=== Critical response ===
Toshi Nakamura of Kotaku felt The Idolmaster Movie: Beyond the Brilliant Future! was "quite enjoyable, if a little long. The main story expands on the anime storyline and utilizes the characters well without betraying anything that came before, but with little to no character development for the main 12 girls, the movie ends up feeling a little on the fan service side – more a side story than a sequel or evolution." Nakamura praised how the existing characters "evolved (relatively) since their humble beginnings and the movie does a good job of showing that they've changed and matured, while at their core they remain the same people" and how the characters from Million Live! were introduced without "shov[ing] that fact in your face and no previous experience with [the game] is necessary to enjoy [the film]." However, he had "mixed" feelings toward the visual quality, the film's second act, which he felt that it "drags on a little long and it feels like the movie is stamping its feet and wallowing in its own angst", and the huge cast, which he could only remember a handful of them that had made a real impression.

=== Accolades ===
Year	Award	Category	Nominee(s)	Result	Ref.
2014	Newtype Anime Awards	Best Picture (Film)	The Idolmaster Movie: Beyond the Brilliant Future!	Won	
2014	Newtype Anime Awards	Best Male Character	Producer	Nominated	
2014	Newtype Anime Awards	Best Female Character	Haruka Amami	Won	
2014	Newtype Anime Awards	Best Female Character	Chihaya Kisaragi	Nominated	
2014	Newtype Anime Awards	Best Female Character	Hibiki Ganaha	Nominated	
2014	Newtype Anime Awards	Best Female Character	Iori Minase	Nominated	
2014	Newtype Anime Awards	Best Mascot Character	Hamuzo	Nominated	
2014	Newtype Anime Awards	Best Theme Song	"Masterpiece"	Won	
2014	Newtype Anime Awards	Best Director	Atsushi Nishigori	Won	
2014	Newtype Anime Awards	Best Screenplay	Atsushi Nishigori and Tatsuya Takahashi	Nominated	
2014	Newtype Anime Awards	Best Character Design	Atsushi Nishigori	Nominated	
2014	Newtype Anime Awards	Best Sound	The Idolmaster Movie: Beyond the Brilliant Future!	Nominated	
2015	Tokyo Anime Award Festival	Anime Fan Award	The Idolmaster Movie: Beyond the Brilliant Future!	6th place	

== Future ==
=== Potential second The Idolmaster film ===
In April 2014, Yūma Takahashi, the advertising producer for The Idolmaster anime series, stated that a second film of the franchise was "not completely out of the question."

=== Continuation ===
Nishigori depicted the world of The Idolmaster in the film's closing credits, featuring still images of Kotoha Tanaka, Matsuri Tokugawa, Emily Stewart, and Fūka Toyokawa from Million Live!, and Rin Shibuya from Cinderella Girls, as he hoped it "expands in the future." He stated that those characters "may also appear and grow as new buds in the future." In April 2014, an anime television adaptation of Cinderella Girls was confirmed. It began airing in Japan on January 10, 2015. An anime television adaptation of Million Live! was confirmed in July 2020. In January 2023, the voice actresses of the backup dancers in the film were revealed to be returning to reprise their roles. The following month, Akabane, Ōtsuka, and Takita were confirmed to be returning for the anime series, with Akabane's updated role as the Chief Producer. All episodes were theatrically released in three parts in Japan beginning August 2023 before its broadcast on October 8.
