= The Idolmaster Shiny Festa =

2012 rhythm game by Namco Bandai Games

- Cover art for The Idolmaster Shiny Festa: Funky Note. From bottom-left going clockwise: Yayoi, Hibiki, Ami, Mami and Iori.
- Developers: Namco Bandai Studios; A-1 Pictures (animation)
- Publisher: Namco Bandai Games
- Producer: Yōzō Sakagami
- Series: The Idolmaster
- Platforms: PlayStation Portable, iOS; PlayStation 3 (Shiny TV)
- Release: PlayStation Portable: JP: October 25, 2012; iOS: WW: April 22, 2013; PlayStation 3: JP: October 2, 2013 (Shiny TV)
- Genre: Rhythm game
- Mode: Single-player

The Idolmaster Shiny Festa (Japanese: アイドルマスター シャイニーフェスタ, Hepburn: Aidorumasutā Shainī Fesuta; officially stylized as THE iDOLM@STER SHINY FESTA) is a series of three Japanese rhythm video games developed by Namco Bandai Studios and published by Namco Bandai Games. The games are part of The Idolmaster franchise, and were originally released on October 25, 2012, as Honey Sound (ハニー サウンド, Hanī Saundo), Funky Note (ファンキー ノート, Fankī Nōto), and Groovy Tune (グルーヴィー チューン, Gurūvī Chūn) for the PlayStation Portable in Japan. They were the first games in the series to be localized into English, and were released for iOS on April 22, 2013, as Harmonic Score, Rhythmic Record, and Melodic Disc, while retaining their original names for the Japanese versions. Service for the iOS version was discontinued on March 15, 2016.

The gameplay in Shiny Festa eschews the simulation format of previous Idolmaster games, and instead features a rhythmic gameplay in which the player times the presses of buttons to the rhythm of the songs and a predetermined pattern displayed on the screen. Each game features a different array of characters and songs, and also includes an original video animation episode produced by A-1 Pictures and directed by Atsushi Nishigori. The games' story centers on the 765 Production's participation in a music festival, and is told via the anime episodes and occasional dialogue included in the games.

Development of Shiny Festa began as a result of series producer Yōzō Sakagami's desire to create a video game that has a lighter feel and makes use of the franchise's songs that had not been featured in video game form. Shiny Festa's original releases sold a total of 119,132 copies in its first week of release in Japan, and together ranked as the best-selling video game in Japan that week. The games were described by reviewers as accessible to the franchise's new and existing fans, but the iOS releases were criticized by journalists for their prohibitive pricing. The mechanics of Shiny Festa later reappear in The Idolmaster Shiny TV, a high-definition remastered version for the PlayStation 3.

== Gameplay ==
Typical gameplay in Shiny Festa depicting Yayoi in a music video. The player must press buttons corresponding to the direction the notes originate from as they pass over the target icon.

Shiny Festa is a series of three rhythm games that feature various characters and songs from The Idolmaster video game franchise. At the beginning of each game, a twenty-three-minute anime episode is played to introduce the games' story: 765 Production (765 Pro), the talent agency where the protagonist works as a producer, is invited to participate in a music festival; however, only a few of its members may attend. The characters who attend the music festival, as well as the songs and episode that correspond to the characters, are dependent on the version of the game. In Harmonic Score and Honey Sound, the selected members are Haruka Amami, Chihaya Kisaragi, and Azusa Miura, and they are joined by Ritsuko Akizuki, who also performs in the festival, as their producer; in Rhythmic Record and Funky Note, Yayoi Takatsuki, Iori Minase, Hibiki Ganaha, and Ami and Mami Futami are chosen to attend the festival with the protagonist Producer; lastly Miki Hoshii, Yukiho Hagiwara, Makoto Kikuchi, and Takane Shijō make up the group of idols chosen to attend in Melodic Disc and Groovy Tune.

Like other games in the genre, the player plays the main portion of Shiny Festa's gameplay, Stage mode, as he or she listens to a selected song. Each song's performance is limited to a predetermined idol or group of idols, unlike the franchise's previous games. During a song, a predetermined sequence of note icons scroll along several lines, called Melody Lines, toward a central target icon. To complete a song, the player must press buttons that correspond to the direction from which the notes originate from—the buttons on the console's left and right halves for the PlayStation Portable version, and the left and right halves of the screen for the iOS version—as they pass over the target icon. The player is scored by these presses' accuracy in timing and direction, for which he or she is given one of four ratings: Perfect, Good, Normal, and Bad. The player's performance is also represented by the Sparkle Meter, which increases or decreases as the player successfully or fails to hit a note. Throughout the song, new target icons and lines may spawn at predetermined times in different locations of the screen to supersede or accompany old ones. The note sequences may also include Long Icons, which are streaks of notes that need to be continuously held down; Simultaneous Icons, which are pairs of icons that pass over the target icon simultaneously; and Shooting Stars, which appears once the Sparkle Meter is filled, and causes a Shining Burst that raises the player's score and changes the song's accompanying music video when it is hit. The complexity of the song's sequence varies based on the player's selected difficulty for the song; there are four difficulty levels: Debut, Normal, Pro, and Master from the easiest to the hardest.

At the end of each song, a result screen is displayed to player, and his or her performance is rated with a letter grade, a numerical score, and a percentage that represents his or her accuracy. The player is awarded a number of fans and in-game money for his or her performance. The number of fans determine the idols' ranking, and as the player's idols increase in ranking, more items become available for purchase. These items can then be used to customize the game's appearance or adjust gameplay elements, such as straightening the Melody Lines' shapes or causing the player to gain fans quicker. Finishing a song also earns the player Memories with the idols who perform the song, which can be used in the Star of Festa game mode.

Star of Festa is a gameplay mode in which the player's idol unit participates in a five-day music festival. On each of the five in-game days, the player is required to consecutively play three songs, and for each song, he or she is given a score that represents votes given by the in-game audience. For the third song every day, the player may choose to compete against a computer-controlled opponent, represented as idols from 876 Production, 961 Production's Jupiter, and characters from The Idolmaster Cinderella Girls and other Shiny Festa games. By defeating his or her opponent, the player gains additional votes and earns the opponent's Name Card, which are shared across the three Shiny Festa games and passively grants additional votes. In addition to Name Cards, the player can also earn additional votes by using the Memories an idol has earned toward Memory Boosters. The player may choose to use the Memories of any of the idols who sings in the song, and if it is activated, Memory Booster icons appear throughout the song once the player has received a Shining Burst. To successfully complete Star of Festa, the player must accumulate 100,000 votes by the end of the last day.

== Development and release ==
The Idolmaster series producer Yōzō Sakagami attributed the development of a rhythm game in the series to two reasons. Noting that songs have a strong meaning to the franchise, he had wanted to make the songs that were included in the series' albums but not in its video games to be accessible in that form. He also wanted to create an Idolmaster video game that, while maintaining a producer's viewpoint, has a lighter feel and would allow the player to hum along to the idols as he or she plays. He pointed out that the rhythm game genre fell in line with these two desires, and this led to the development of Shiny Festa. The team chose to develop for the PlayStation Portable (PSP) as he felt it was simple to play on. At the same time, the team also wanted to create scenes where the series' thirteen idols would be able to appear together, and chose to use pre-rendered videos to make this possible. Sakagami also noted that the development team deliberately chose to use a gameplay system in which the note icons float toward the screen's center to attract the player to look at the videos in the background.

The games' anime scenes were directed by Atsushi Nishigori and produced by A-1 Pictures, who also created The Idolmaster anime adaptation in 2011. According to Yōsuke Toba, Aniplex's producer for the anime television series, he was told about the plans of including anime material in Shiny Festa during production of the TV anime's final episode, and he did not inform Nishigori until later on. Series director Akihiro Ishihara said that each anime episode was initially planned to be about ten minutes long, but Nishigori extended each episode to its current length, feeling that the episodes would not be fun if they were too short. Three teams were formed to create the three episodes, and Nishigori noted that this enticed each team to compete with each other during production.

Shiny Festa was first released in Japan on October 25, 2012, for the PSP in three versions—Honey Sound, Funky Note, Groovy Tune—in both retail and downloadable forms; the downloadable versions are also playable on the PlayStation Vita. The PSP games' first printing also included a "backstage pass" that granted access to an online merchandise store, a product code for the song "The World is All One!" to be used in the games, and a serial number that granted a special Shiny Festa version of Haruka Amami for use in The Idolmaster Cinderella Girls. In conjunction with the release, peripheral manufacturer Hori released a set of accessories with Shiny Festa designs; the set includes three cases for the games' Universal Media Discs, a protective casing, and decorative stickers for the PSP's 3000 model. The games were later released in English for iOS devices on April 22, 2013, and became the first games in the series to be localized and released outside Japan. The titles of the English releases were respectively renamed as Harmonic Score, Rhythmic Record, and Melodic Disc, but the games retained the original titles for the Japanese iOS releases. Support for the iOS releases ended on March 15, 2016, and the downloadable content was also made unavailable on that date. The three anime episodes were released on October 8, 2014, alongside The Idolmaster Movie: Beyond the Brilliant Future! as a Blu-ray Disc as part of a limited edition bundle.

The mechanics of Shiny Festa were later ported to the PlayStation 3 as The Idolmaster Shiny TV as a high-definition remastered rhythm game. Shiny TV was released as part of the Imas Channel app on October 2, 2013. Unlike the Shiny Festa releases, only one song, "We Have a Dream", was initially available in Shiny TV, and additional songs are added to the game as downloadable content packs called mini albums. Bandai Namco Games released 12 mini albums for the game between October 2, 2013—beginning with the releases of mini albums for Haruka Amami and Yayoi Takatsuki—and February 19, 2014.

=== Music ===
Across its three versions, Shiny Festa features a total of 48 songs written and composed by a variety of songwriters. Each version is composed of 20 songs, of which six are performed by 765 Pro Allstars and common to all three versions. The majority of the remaining songs in each version are exclusive to that version and performed by its featured idols, although there is also one exclusive song performed by 765 Pro Allstars in each version. An additional song, "The World is All One!!", was available for download to players who purchased a first printing copy of the PSP games. Four songs were originally introduced in Shiny Festa: "Music" appears in all three versions, "Vault That Borderline!" is featured in Honey Sound and Harmonic Score, "edeN" is featured in Groovy Tune and Melodic Disc, and "Visionary" (ビジョナリー) is featured in Funky Note and Rhythmic Record.

Unlike Shiny Festa, only the song "We Have a Dream" is initially playable in Shiny TV, and additional songs must be purchased as downloadable content. In addition to the songs originally contained in the Shiny Festa games, there are 14 extra songs available to download. Out of these, the song "Machiuke Prince" (待ち受けプリンス) was first introduced with the game, and it is made available to the player with the purchase of any mini album, while access to the songs "Arcadia" and "Sora" (空) are granted to players who purchased respectively the first and last six mini albums.

== Reception ==
The original PlayStation Portable (PSP) versions of the Shiny Festa games sold 119,132 units in their first week of sales, and together ranked as the best-selling video game in Japan that week. The PSP versions received a combined review score of 32 out of 40 from the Japanese video game magazine Famitsu. At the third Newtype Anime Awards in 2013, Shiny Festa's anime sequences received first place in the Game Animation category. Critics commonly agree that Shiny Festa, while it appeals to the franchise's existing fans, is accessible and welcoming to new fans whose first exposure to the franchise is its anime adaptation. Japanator's Jeff Chuang wrote that the game is "twice the fun" to fans of the franchise's songs, while Elliot Gay, writing for the same website, argued that the games' inclusion of anime material pointed to the game's development as "fanservice for fans". Reviewers also agreed that despite its simple gameplay, Shiny Festa still provides substantial challenge. Famitsu's reviewers wrote that while the game has a simpler control scheme compared to other rhythm games, it becomes difficult when played on the Master difficulty. Gay and Chuang both agreed that the simple gameplay becomes appropriately difficult with the higher difficulties, while ASCII Media Works' Lipton Kumada noted that the game becomes harder as variations such as simultaneous and long icons are added.

The iOS version's improvements over the original PSP version were positively received. The website Famitsu App noted that the iOS version has shorter loading times and greater display resolution compared to the PSP version. Gay wrote that the iPhone 4's Retina Display made the game look "a whole lot better than it did on the PSP or Vita", while Kumada said he was stunned to see the iPhone 5's more vibrant colors and lack of interlacing, despite its smaller screen compared to the PSP. At the same time, reviewers had mixed opinions regarding the iOS' version's control scheme. Ryūichi Matsumoto of 4Gamer.net appreciated the iOS version's use of touch screen input, feeling that it simplified the controls and Gay felt the touch controls felt natural. In contrast, Famitsu App's writer felt that it was easier to hold down notes with the PSP's buttons, and Chuang said that playing on an iPad Mini felt less precise than on the PSP, but noted that the player can theoretically "hit the notes even faster" with a touch screen. Chuang also noted he occasionally opened the iOS version's pause menu by accident due to the touch controls, and Matsumoto complained that the use of touch screen input meant that his fingers would be blocking his view.

Many journalists, particularly non-Japanese press, reacted negatively toward the iOS version's pricing in comparison to other games for the platform. Kotaku's Mike Fahey described the games as "a tough sell" at US$54.99 each and approximately $170 altogether in a market "dominated by free and $.99 games". Technology Tell's Jenni Lada noted that the PSP version would be cheaper when imported, and criticized Bandai Namco Games for "setting [the release] up to fail". Elliot Gay felt the games were expensive, but pointed out that it has "never been cheap to be" a fan of the franchise. Likewise, Kumada felt the iOS games were too expensive as mobile apps, but thought it was a "bit of a bargain" in comparison to the PSP versions' full retail prices.
