= The Idolmaster Must Songs =

2015 video game

The Idolmaster Must Songs Presented by Taiko no Tatsujin
- Developer: Bandai Namco Studios
- Publisher: Bandai Namco Entertainment
- Series: The Idolmaster; Taiko no Tatsujin
- Platform: PlayStation Vita
- Release: JP: December 10, 2015
- Genre: Rhythm
- Mode: Single-player

The Idolmaster Must Songs Presented by Taiko no Tatsujin (アイドルマスター マストソングスPresented by 太鼓の達人; officially stylized as THE iDOLM@STER MUST SONGS Presented by Taiko no Tatsujin) is a PlayStation Vita rhythm game, released by Bandai Namco Entertainment on December 10, 2015. Though a title of The Idolmaster series, its game system is drawn from Taiko no Tatsujin. Must Songs was released in two versions, each featuring different music: Aka-ban (赤盤, Red Disc) and Ao-ban (青盤, Blue Disc). Aka-ban features earlier music in the original The Idolmaster series, and Ao-ban features music from the 2nd Vision games; both versions contain 40 songs. The game received a score of 32 out of 40 from the Japanese video game magazine Famitsu.
