= The Idolmaster Cinderella Girls: Starlight Stage =

2015 dancing simulation video game

- Promotional image featuring (from left to right): Kirari Moroboshi, Rin Shibuya, Uzuki Shimamura, Mio Honda, and Anzu Futaba
- Developer: Cygames
- Publisher: Bandai Namco Entertainment
- Producer: Shirō Ogata
- Series: The Idolmaster
- Engine: Unity
- Platforms: Android, iOS, Windows
- Release: Android: JP: September 3, 2015; iOS: JP: September 10, 2015; Windows (on DMM Games): JP: September 3, 2021 – August 21, 2025 (3 years, 11 months, 2 weeks and 4 days)
- Genres: Collectible card, rhythm
- Modes: Single-player, multiplayer

The Idolmaster Cinderella Girls: Starlight Stage (Japanese: アイドルマスター シンデレラガールズ スターライトステージ, Hepburn: Aidorumasutā Shinderera Gāruzu Sutāraito Sutēji) is a Japanese free-to-play collectible card and rhythm video game in The Idolmaster series co-developed by Cygames and published by Bandai Namco Entertainment. The game is a spin-off of The Idolmaster Cinderella Girls and part of The Idolmaster series. It was originally released in Japan on September 3, 2015, for Android and on September 10, 2015, for iOS.

The story in Starlight Stage centers on the pop idols from the talent agency 346 Production. Unlike the simulation format of the original Cinderella Girls, Starlight Stage features a rhythmic gameplay in which the player times the presses of buttons to the rhythm of the songs and a predetermined pattern displayed on the screen. The game reached 4 million downloads by September 11, 2015, and ranked third on the iOS App Store's sales ranking that day. In 2017, the game grossed ¥26.6 billion in Japan.

On July 2, 2025, it was announced that the game service operations would change later: Most of the new contents updates (including new idols, songs, stories, most events and more) would end after October 1, after the 10th anniversary of the game, and the Windows (DMM Games) release would end the service on August 21, 2025, along with the spin-off app "Starlight Spot".

== Gameplay ==
Typical gameplay in Starlight Stage depicting Sachiko, Uzuki, and Miku. The player must tap the target icons in the bottom when rhythm icons pass over them.

Starlight Stage is a rhythm game in which the player assumes the role of a producer who works at 346 Production (346 Pro), a talent agency that represents the pop idol characters from The Idolmaster Cinderella Girls video game and anime. (Note: In the original Cinderella Girls video game, the idols are not represented by a single, specific company. In the anime adaptation and Starlight Stage, the idol characters original to Cinderella Girls all work for a single talent agency named 346 Production.) Idol characters in the game are divided into three categories: cute, cool, and passion. Each character herself can have different variants—also called idols and represented in the game as collectible cards—each of which is designated a rarity: normal, rare, S rare, or SS rare, all of which also have a "plus" variant. Each idol also has four statistics points: vocal, dance, visual—which are tallied together as her total appeal value—and life, which represents her health value, and a skill that influence gameplay. To raise an idol's statistics points and level, the player may have her participate in lessons, which expends up to twenty other idols or trainer tickets in exchange for experience points.

To play the Live mode, the main portion of Starlight Stage's gameplay, the player must first assemble a unit of five idols consisting of a center idol, whose center effect is applied to the unit, and four other members. The unit also consists of ten back members automatically selected by the game based on their statistics points and a guest idol belonging to another player, who must be chosen by the player. Like other games in the genre, the player plays the Live mode as he or she listens to a selected song. Each song is assigned one of four categories: cute, cool, passion, and all type; the song's category affects the appeal values of idols that belong to the same category. During a song, a predetermined sequence of Rhythm Icons scroll from top to bottom towards the target icons in one of five lanes, and the player must tap the target icons as the Rhythm Icons pass over them. In addition, the sequence may also include notes that must be continuously held down or flicked in one direction. The player is scored by the timing accuracy of these taps and is given one of four ratings: Perfect, Great, Nice, Bad. Although the score is not deducted if the player fails to hit a note, the idol unit's life bar decreases whenever the player misses or receives a Bad rating. If the life bar goes down to zero, the song will end prematurely. Scoring is also affected by each idol's skill, which provides different gameplay benefits and are activated automatically at random. The complexity of the song's sequence varies based on the player's selected difficulty for the song as well as its level; there are four difficulty levels: Debut, Regular, Pro, and Master from the easiest to the hardest. An additional difficulty level, Master+, is available for certain songs during special game events. Players are restricted from the number of songs they can play at one time by a stamina gauge, which depletes each time the player plays a song and replenishes over time, when stamina drink items are used, or when paid items called Star Jewels are used.

At the end of each song, a result screen is displayed to player, and his or her performance is rated with a letter grade, a numerical score, and a percentage that represents his or her accuracy. The player is awarded an amount of in-game money for his or her performance, while each idol also receive a number of fans and affection points. Affection points are specific to each specific idol, and by reaching the maximum possible value, the individual idol's statistics points are increased and the option to enhance her rarity to its plus variant becomes available. In contrast, each individual idol's number of fans are tallied together with the idol character's other variants, and when an idol character reaches certain fan thresholds, additional visual novel story sequences that focus on the character called idol communications are made available to the player. The game's story is also told through episodes called story communications, each of which makes available an additional song for play upon completion.

Each player also has access to an office room which is frequented by his or her idols. The room may be customized and decorated with items by using in-game money to purchase room items, which may also be upgradable and can provide gameplay benefits. Players may also interact with the idols in his or her room, listen to or purchase additional songs, as well as visit the rooms of other players.

== Development and release ==
The official illustration for the game's 10th anniversary, featuring some of the idols in the game: Uzuki Shimamura, Izumi Ohishi, Riamu Yumemi, Mirei Hayasaka, Kotoka Saionji, Yui Ohtsuki, Rika Jougasaki, Kanade Hayami, Risa Matoba, and Shiki Ichinose. There's a lineup change from the artwork to the MV of the song "Everafter", when Nono Morikubo replaced Rika's position.

Starlight Stage was primarily developed by Cygames with Shirō Ogata of Bandai Namco Entertainment serving as its producer. When the game's development began, the team at Cygames considered both Unity and Cocos2d-x for the game's engine. The team wanted an engine that could consistently maintain a frame rate of 60 frames per second (FPS) and have high-quality graphics with idol-like qualities. With these requirements in mind, the staff spent about a month on each engine to evaluate its performance and capabilities. Despite the fact that Unity 5 was only recently released and had issues with performance spikes, Unity was ultimately chosen for its efficiency and the quality that the team achieved with it during experimentation. Engineer Masaru Kanai thought that the inclusion of graphical effects such as bloom and depth of field was the most effective way to enhance the game's graphical appeal, and he noted that much of the graphical effects used in the game originated from the first month of testing. To ensure that the game is playable at 60 FPS on low-spec devices, the team also created a lightweight, 3D setting with reduced effects and 2D modes.

The idol characters' 3D models were created by Cygames artists based on their original appearances in Cinderella Girls and checked by Cinderella Girls illustrators. Likewise, the original Cinderella Girls illustrations were consulted to determine each idol's dominant eye. Artist team manager Yūma Tanimoto noted that because the game's appeal lies in its 3D stage performances, the team placed significant importance on faithfully recreating the Cinderella Girls idols in 3D with specifications such as polygon count and texture resolution matching those of PlayStation 3 games. Tanimoto considered outlines to be crucial to portray the original illustrations in 3D, and the characters' textures were applied to the outlines' meshes with color adjustments to better replicate how outlines were drawn in 2D illustrations. In order to create the character models more efficiently and to better manage the amount of data used, the game's idol characters reuse sets of body parts that match their height, bust size, weight, and skin tone. In addition to nine standard facial expressions such as smiles and winks, each idol character also has a unique expression, such as Uzuki Shimamura's signature smile, Rika Jougasaki's twinkling eyes, and Nono Morikubo's eyes avoiding the camera. A cloth simulator was also implemented and optimized in order to portray Yoshino Yorita's furisode costume.

To assist with the creation of the game's stage performances, the development staff created a custom timeline editor for Unity named Cygames Unity Timeline Tool to adjust variables such as the idols' expressions, lip sync, and camera angles. This made the stage performances' creation process easier, and it allowed the staff to create performances at the pace of three to four songs a month. The game's dance sequences were first designed by choreographers and then performed by dancers for motion capture with hand movements animated by hand. The development team had wanted to include a different set of choreography for each idol during a stage performance, but the idea was abandoned because of the necessary amount of data and extra workload. Instead, all five members perform the same dance sequence with time offsets intentionally introduced to make them appear less mechanical.

Starlight Stage was first revealed on June 28, 2015, at a public recording of Internet radio talk show Radio The Idolmaster Cinderella Girls Dereraji A. It was then released in Japan on September 3, 2015, for Android and on September 10, 2015, for iOS. A Windows version was released on DMM Games on September 3, 2021. To promote the game's release, Bandai Namco produced and aired multiple television commercials featuring Masahiro Nakai of SMAP.

== Reception ==
=== Commercial performance ===
Starlight Stage reached 4 million downloads in the Android version's first week of release in Japan. The game was the third top-grossing video game on the iOS App Store the day after its release, and by December 2015 had reached 10 million downloads. The game's third image song single, "The Idolmaster Cinderella Girls Starlight Master 03 HiFi Days", was the first single in The Idolmaster franchise to debut at No. 1 on Japan's Oricon weekly singles chart, selling approximately 89,000 copies in its first week of release. It was the first image song single to top the singles chart in six years since K-On!'s "Go! Go! Maniac" in 2010. "HiFi Days" was awarded a Gold disc by the Recording Industry Association of Japan in June 2016 for shipping 100,000 copies. At ASCII Media Works' Dengeki Online Award 2015, Starlight Stage received second place in the app category, placing it behind Type-Moon's Fate/Grand Order.

In 2017, the game grossed ¥26.6 billion in Japan. In 2018, it grossed ¥22.5 billion in Japan, where it was the year's 14th highest-grossing mobile game. Combined, the game grossed ¥49.1 billion ($447 million) in Japan between 2017 and 2018.

As of March 2021, the game has received 25 million downloads.

=== Critical reception ===
Writing for the website Gamer, reviewer Token described the game as "fundamentally an orthodox rhythm game", but he pointed to the game's sliding controls as an aspect that greatly increases the game's complexity at higher difficulty levels. In his 4Gamer.net column, writer Mafia Kajita also thought that the game's higher difficulty levels are too complex, but noted that he enjoyed playing the game at its Regular difficulty level.

Critics commonly gave praise to the quality of the game's 3D models and stage performances. Dengeki App's Tsuneki Hara praised the game for being able to "perfectly capture the minor differences in each idol's style with the 3D models", while Kajita wrote that "it was shocking how the 3D models are this cute" despite the large number of characters in the game. Token described the game's stage performance aspect, featuring 3D models of Cinderella Girls characters, as exciting and considered it to be an important aspect for the franchise's fans. Likewise, Hara praised the game's choreography, and noted that it was hard for him to keep himself from shifting his attention to the idols' dancing during gameplay. Excite News' Tamagomago thought that the humanity and individuality of the game's characters were deepened thanks to content such as communications and the one-panel manga, and called their inclusion a "plus for a rhythm game". Hara praised the communications aspect for supplementing the stories of idol characters whose backgrounds were not previously covered, while Token wrote that, having only been exposed to the Cinderella Girls anime adaptation before, he learned more about the characters via the communications. Token lauded the game for its large volume and noted its different aspects connect well to each other, making the game feel balanced and easy to play.

== Notes and references ==
Notes
