= The Idolmaster Million Live! =

Multimedia idol series by Bandai Namco

- CD cover art of "THE IDOLM@STER LIVE THE@TER DREAMERS 01 Dreaming!" featuring idols from Million Live! from left to right: Shizuka, Mirai, and Tsubasa.

アイドルマスター ミリオンライブ！ (Aidorumasutā Mirion Raibu!)
- Genre: Idol
- Created by: Bandai Namco Entertainment
- Video game
- Developer: Bandai Namco Studios
- Publisher: Bandai Namco Entertainment
- Genre: Simulation, Social network game
- Platform: GREE (iOS, Android, PC)
- Released: JP: February 27, 2013
- Video game

The Idolmaster Million Live! Theater Days
- Developer: Bandai Namco Studios
- Publisher: Bandai Namco Entertainment
- Genre: Simulation, Rhythm Game, Social network game
- Platform: iOS, Android
- Released: JP: June 29, 2017
- Anime television series
- Directed by: Shinya Watada
- Produced by: Koichiro Tomita; Yuka Takei
- Written by: Yōichi Katō
- Music by: Torine
- Studio: Shirogumi
- Licensed by: Crunchyroll
- Original network: TV Tokyo
- Original run: October 8, 2023 – December 24, 2023
- Episodes: 12 + OVA

The Idolmaster Million Live (Japanese: アイドルマスター ミリオンライブ！, Hepburn: Aidorumasutā Mirion Raibu!; officially stylized as THE iDOLM@STER MILLION LIVE!) is a Japanese multimedia spin-off series of The Idolmaster, starting with the game of the same name. The series follows a new group of idols working alongside the idols of 765 Production with a producer at the 765 Live Theater.

The original game is a Japanese idol raising simulation video game developed and managed by Bandai Namco Entertainment released on the GREE social network platform February 27, 2013, for Android and iOS platforms and for feature phones. A rhythm game titled Idolmaster Million Live! Theater Days was released on June 29, 2017. The original game ended service on March 18, 2018, leaving Theater Days as the main game centered on Million Live. An anime television series adaptation by Shirogumi aired in October 2023.

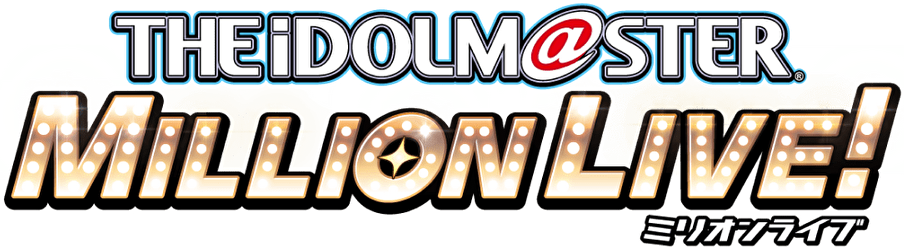
Logo

== Overview ==
Million Live! introduces 37 idols, working alongside the 13 idols of 765 Production; Theater Days adds two more idols and a secretary. Compared to other spin-offs in the Idolmaster series, the new idols work with and interact with the idols of 765. The general design and much of the visual elements are done by A-1 Pictures, the same animation studio responsible for animating several of the Idolmaster anime series.

== Gameplay ==
=== GREE game ===
The game was a free-to-play idol raising simulator in which the player, as the producer, trained idols and sent them to work in various locations while also making the idols 765 Production Theater bigger. The idols were obtained through collecting cards ranked by rarity and divided into three categories, Vocal, Dance, and Visual, with a fourth category, Ex, reserved for special cards. Leveling up the cards made the idols stronger, with the higher rarities being able to reach higher levels.

The feature phone version was discontinued on February 2, 2016; a desktop client was released within the same month. The GREE game was shut down on March 19, 2018.

=== Theater Days ===
A second game titled Idolmaster Million Live! Theater Days was released June 29, 2017, for Android and iOS platforms. It is a rhythm game and simulation game, with 3D models, periodically released story missions, and multiple choice 'communication' events with the idols in the vein of the original Idolmaster games.

Many of the cards from the original game are reused in Theater Days.

== Media ==
=== Animations ===
Seven of the idols from Million Live are featured in the anime film The Idolmaster Movie: Beyond the Brilliant Future!.

Special animation videos for Million Live have been created as anniversary celebrations. The first animation, a video featuring Mirai Kasuga, was created for the first anniversary and streamed in-game. A 10-minute animation was created for its fourth anniversary. Both were animated by A-1 Pictures.

=== TV Anime ===
An anime television series adaptation of Million Live! was announced during the Theater Days 3rd anniversary livestream in July 2020. It is animated by Shirogumi and directed by Shinya Watada, with series composition and script by Yōichi Katō, and character designs for animation by Tetsuya Ishii and Kaori Tsuta. The series premiered on October 8, 2023, TV Tokyo and other networks. Before its television airing, the series was released theatrically in three parts. The first part was screened from August 18 to September 7; the second part from September 8 to 28; and the third part from September 29 to October 19. Crunchyroll streamed the series.

An original video animation (OVA) episode was released in a Blu-ray Disc on March 27, 2026.

==== Episodes ====
No.	Title	Directed by	Written by	Storyboarded by	Original release date
1	"My Very Own Dream Just for Me"; Transliteration: "Tatta Hitotsu no Jibunrashī Yume" (Japanese: たったひとつの自分らしい夢)	Daisuke Shioya	Yōichi Katō	Shinya Watada, Yōhei Arai, Junichi Umezawa, Kaori Tsuta, Shuuta Hase	October 8, 2023
Mirai Kasuga is a high school girl trying to find a dream to follow. After trying out various school clubs and sports teams, she decides to attend a concert hosted by 765 Production. While there, she encounters Shizuka Mogami and they quickly bond over their mutual admiration for idols. Meanwhile, Tsubasa Ibuki arrives at the concert and meets one of 765 Pro's producers to watch the concert as well. All three girls are inspired by the performance the 765 Pro idols, and Mirai suggests she and Shizuka audition to 765 Pro together. However, Shizuka remains reluctant, due to her father's disapproval and her own low self confidence, but she is eventually won over by Mirai's enthusiasm. Later that night, Mirai, Shizuka, and Tsubasa all apply to audition to 765 Pro.
2	"Auditions Are the Doorway to Dreams"; Transliteration: "Yume no Tobira wa Ōdishon" (Japanese: 夢のとびらはオーディション)	Sō Yamamura	Yōichi Katō	Yōhei Arai, Kaori Tsuta	October 15, 2023
Mirai and Shizuka spend the next two weeks rigorously practicing in preparation for the final round of auditions. However, since Tsubasa was scouted by the Producer, she is allowed to bypass the auditions. The Producer meanwhile tries to decide what kind of unit to create for all of the newly recruited idols, and both the President and Chief Producer advise him that he needs to find a vision for what he wants his unit to achieve. Once the final round of auditions begin, Mirai and Shizuka arrive and meet the 765 Pro staff and idols. Since the third member of their group failed to appear, the Producer has Tsubasa fill in, and Shizuka is shocked at how naturally talented she is. During the audition performance, Shizuka begins to falter when she suffers a bout of stage fright, but she is able to pull through thanks to encouragement from both Mirai and Tsubasa. Their performance ends up entrancing the judges and the audience and gives the Producer the inspiration he needs. Mirai and Shizuka pass the audition and officially become idols for 765 Pro while the Producer decides to name his new unit "MILLIONSTARS".
3	"Sparkling World! Our Theater!"; Transliteration: "Kirameku Sekai! Watashi-tachi no Shiatā!" (Japanese: きらめく世界！私たちのシアター！)	Kazufumi Tenjō	Yōichi Katō	Masanori Takahashi, Kaori Tsuta	October 22, 2023
The President reveals that the MILLIONSTARS will debut at 765 Pro's newest venue, the 765PRO Live Theater, and designates the Producer as the lead manager of MILLIONSTARS. While touring the site, Mirai, Shizuka, and Tsubasa meet several fellow idols, and the Producer explains that MILLIONSTARS consists of 37 idols so that rotating performances can be scheduled while the ALLSTARS are on a national tour. The Producer is then called away on a sudden matter, so he assigns Yuriko Nano to help mentor the trio. However, Yuriko notices that she can barely keep up with the newer idols. Meanwhile, the Producer asks the Chief Producer how he can better help his idols prepare for their debut in two months, and the Chief Producer advises him to work together with his idols to move forward. The idols then tour the still under construction theater and Yuriko takes them to the roof to show them the nighttime view, talking about her passion to become an idol. Returning home, Mirai reflects on how all of the idols she met were so eager to debut, and she comes up with the idea that MILLIONSTARS can debut right away on the empty field next to the theater.
4	"We're Putting On a Concert in a Field?!"; Transliteration: "Harappa Raibu Hajimemasu!?" (Japanese: 原っぱライブ はじめます⁉)	Takamitsu Hirakawa	Yōichi Katō	Yōhei Arai	October 29, 2023
Mirai suggest to the Producer and the other members of MILLIONSTARS to have a concert in the empty field next to the theater. The Producer and most of the idols are supportive, but a few remain skeptical that such an ambitious event can be done on such short notice. In addition, poor communication and organization lead many of the idols to have misunderstandings about the nature of the field concert, while the Producer struggles to put together the schedule and resources needed. After Roco Handa is nearly hurt when one of her artworks collapses in a sudden storm, the Producer gathers all the idols together to set the record straight. The various idols voice their concerns, such as conflicting schedules, how to attract an audience, and how some of them don't feel ready to perform yet. Momoko Suou also points out as idols, they shouldn't be organizing their own events and should focus on preparing for the theater's opening instead. The Producer then meets Mirai backstage and asks her why she wants the field concert to happen. Mirai explains that she can see everybody's dream is to debut on stage, and she wants to make it happen so they can all realize their dreams. The Producer assures Mirai that he plans to work together with all of idols to make the concert happen. Tsubasa secretly broadcasts their conversation over the theater's speaker system, inspiring all the other idols of MILLIONSTARS to band together and make the field concert happen.
5	"Our Incomplete Thank You!"; Transliteration: "Mikansei no Thank You!" (Japanese: 未完成のThank You!)	Daisuke Shioya, Kazufumi Tenjō	Yōichi Katō	Junichi Umezawa, Kazufumi Tenjō	November 5, 2023
With the concert rebranded as a theater pre-opening event, the idols of MILLIONSTARS all band together to make preparations over the next 12 days. Mirai, Shizuka, and Tsubasa end being part of the team that will perform on stage, while the other idols advertise the event or plan to host their own booths and events to show off their skills such as guitar playing, magic tricks, and cooking. Roco works on the decorations, and comes up with the idea for an elaborate tent to decorate the stage, though progress is slow since the tent must be sewed by hand. Despite the intensive work, the idols are able to work together to finish it on the eve of the pre-opening. The next day, the President hires on two new idols, Kaori Sakuramori and Tsumugi Shiraishi, and he recommends they attend the pre-opening. Meanwhile, the pre-opening event proves to be a huge success with a large turnout of guests. Kaori and Tsumugi arrive in time to catch the last performance, where Mirai and her team perform an incomplete version of MILLIONSTARS' first original song "Thank You!". Kaori and Tsumugi leave with fresh inspiration. However, Shizuka's father then arrives and asks Shizuka if she truly wants to be an idol.
6	"The Dream Gets Rolling: Live Theater Project!"; Transliteration: "Ugokidasu Yume Raibu Shiatā Purojekuto!" (Japanese: 動き出す夢 ライブシアタープロジェクト！)	Sō Yamamura	Yōichi Katō	Yōhei Arai	November 12, 2023
Shizuka's father allows her to stay as an idol, but only until she graduates middle school. Despite this, the Producer and the other idols promise to fully support Shizuka. Afterwards, the President and Chief Producer congratulate the Producer on the success of the pre-opening event, and prepare to move on to the Live Theater Project. Meanwhile, Mirai and her friends come across a lost Tsumugi and help her find her way to the theater. They also meet Kaori there, and learn that she is a former music teacher until she was recruited by the Producer for her singing talent. The Producer then announces that there will a press conference to celebrate the opening the theater, and that all of the MILLIONSTARS will make their official debuts as teams with their own unique songs. Team1st which will debut at the press conference will consist of Minako Satake, Shiho Kitazawa, Anna Mochizuki, and Tomoka Tenkubashi. With Shizuka deciding to stay for more practice, Mirai, Tsubasa, Kaori, and Tsumugi return home until they discover Tsumugi assumed they were all living in a dorm and didn't make any living arrangements. While the Producer tries to find accommodations, Mirai decides to host Tsumugi at her own home. Shizuka meanwhile asks Shiho for advice, and Shiho tells her to focus on being the idol she wants to be rather than worry about her father's approval. On the day of the press conference, Team1st performs their debut song "Star Impression" to kick off the opening of the theater.
7	"Shocking! Midsummer Sea Debut Battle!"; Transliteration: "Doki~tsu! Manatsu no Umi no Debyū Batoru!" (Japanese: ドキッ！ 真夏の海のデビューバトル！)	Kazufumi Tenjō	Yōichi Katō	Junichi Umezawa, Kazufumi Tenjō	November 19, 2023
Team2nd, consisting of Umi Kousaka, Mizuki Makabe, Noriko Fukuda, Karen Shinomiya, and Rio Momose along with Team3rd consisting of Kotoha Tanaka, Yuriko Nanao, Megumi Tokoro, Fuka Toyokawa, and Tamaki Ogami, are set to debut on a tropical island, where they must compete against each other in various games and contests, with the winner earning the opportunity to perform their debut song after the event. The only rule is that any idol that falls into the sea will be immediately disqualified. As the idols move through various games and obstacles, they are steadily eliminated until it is only Umi, Kotoha, and Megumi left. While climbing a rock wall, Umi is about to fall off when Kotoha and Megumi sacrifice themselves to ensure she can reach the top, despite being on opposing teams. Umi is then able to clear the final obstacle and win the race. With Umi's victory, Team2nd performs their debut song, "Sea Breeze and Castanets (Japanese: 海風とカスタネット, Hepburn: Umikaze to Kasutanetto)". Afterwards, the idols from both teams spend the rest of the day having fun on the beach.
8	"A Performance for Change"; Transliteration: "Kawaru Tame no Sutēji" (Japanese: 変わるためのステージ)	Takamitsu Hirakawa	Yōichi Katō	Masanori Takahashi, Kazufumi Tenjō, Yōhei Arai	November 26, 2023
MILLIONSTARS prepares for the debut of both Team4th and Team5th, who will be performing simultaneously at two different locations. Konomi Baba leads Team4th, consisting of Momoko Suou, Roco Handa, Arisa Matsuda, Nao Yokoyama, and Chizuru Nikaido while the Producer goes to manage Team5th. Team4th arrive at the venue at an amusement part, but are dismayed to discover their intended stage has been flooded by a broken water pipe and they must perform at a dilapidated backup stage instead. Unfortunately, the backup stage's remote location at the edge of the park also means there isn't enough foot traffic to attract an audience. Konomi comes up with an idea to renovate the stage and use a staged street performance starring Momoko in her old role as a child detective to attract a crowd to the stage. The act proves to be a huge success for Team4th. The Producer thanks Konomi for her work while Konomi returns her thanks for scouting her to be an idol.
9	"The Other Baton"; Transliteration: "Mōhitostsu no Baton" (Japanese: もう一つのバトン)	Daisuke Shioya	Yōichi Katō	Yōhei Arai	December 3, 2023
Team6th makes their debut performance while Team7th prepares for theirs. The Producer informs Mirai, Shizuka, Tsubasa, Kaori, and Tsumugi that Team8th will be the final group to debut. However, before that, he has arranged for them to be backup dancers for the ALLSTARS. The Producer takes Team8th to Hakodate for ALLSTARS' next performance, where they meet Haruka Amami, Iori Minase, Yukiho Hagiwara, Makoto Kikuchi, Chihaya Kisaragi, and Miki Hoshii, who Tsubasa idolizes. Haruka reveals that they personally requested Team8th to be their backup dancers. After a rehearsal session, Shizuka, Tsumugi, and Kaori are afraid they can't keep up with the ALLSTARS. However, Chihaya assures Shizuka that she already has what it takes to be an idol, while Iori, Yukiho, and Makoto insist Tsumugi and Kaori just need to focus on improving themselves. Tsubasa meets Miki for an autograph, but Miki warns her to be more serious about being an idol otherwise her friends will surpass her. Mirai meets Haruka and invites her and the ALLSTARS to come to the theater when it opens. Team8th all decide to practice more before the concert, which goes off without a hitch. After the concert, Chihaya approaches Shizuka and asks her to sing alongside her in her next recital.
10	"What an Idol Needs"; Transliteration: "Aidoru ni Taisetsunamono" (Japanese: アイドルに大切なもの)	Sō Yamamura	Yōichi Katō	Kaori Tsuta	December 10, 2023
Chihaya recruits Shizuka, Shiho, and Serika as replacement singers for a charity concert she is participating in due to some of the originally planned singers having to cancel their appearances. Mirai and her friends are glad since Shizuka's performance may convince her father to allow her to become an idol. However, during her training, Shizuka becomes completely obsessed with earning her father's approval and begins pushing herself harder in her training, much to the concern of the other idols. The Producer recognizes this problem and suggests to Chihaya to change Shizuka's focus away from her father. The Producer and Chihaya take Shizuka and the other idols to the church where they will hold the charity concert, and Chihaya decides to sing an impromptu performance for two sisters who had lost their father. The other idols join in, inspiring the sisters, and Shizuka remembers that she wants to sing for her own sake and others, not for her father's approval. Mirai, Tsubasa, and the Producer then approach Shizuka's father and ask him to attend the charity concert to see Shizuka's performance. The next day, Shizuka performs her song "Gift Sign" at the concert and entrances the entire audience, including her father. Her father recalls how Shizuka used to sing for him to make him feel better, and he finally accepts her dream to become an idol.
11	"Feelings to Take Us Through the Door"; Transliteration: "Tobi-ra no Mukō Tsunagaru Omoi" (Japanese: とびらの向こう 繋がる想い)	Kazufumi Tenjō	Yōichi Katō	Junichi Umezawa, Kazufumi Tenjō	December 17, 2023
Mirai and Team8th are excited for their upcoming debut and the opening of the theater. However, they are concerned that due to all the other teams having different work schedules, it will be difficult if not impossible for all 39 idols of MILLIONSTARS to be together at once. Producer decides to organize weekend training camps at the theater where all of the idols will participate. All of the idols gather together at the theater, where they spend the next few weekends training together to perfect their routines as well as gain inspiration from each other to improve their performances. On the day of the theater's opening, the theater is completely sold out with Haruka, Chihaya, and Miki also in attendance. All of the idols begin their performances, with Tsubasa performing the first solo number, "Rocket Star☆ (Japanese: ロケットスター☆, Hepburn: Roketto Sutaa☆)" by her personal request. However, as the concert progresses, the stage equipment begins to show signs of malfunction.
12	"To a New Future"; Transliteration: "Atarashī Mirai e" (Japanese: 新しい未来へ)	Takamitsu Hirakawa	Yōichi Katō	Yōhei Arai	December 24, 2023
The concert continues, with Team8th eagerly awaiting their debut performance at the end. However, in the middle of the concert, the sound system suffers a malfunction, interrupting the performances. As the stage crew attempt to repair the system, everybody becomes nervous that the concert may have to be put on hold or cancelled. Despite this, the crowd continues to cheer on in support of MILLIONSTARS. Fortunately, the stage crew is able to restore power to the sound system, and the concert continues as scheduled. Right before the final performance, Mirai makes a speech to the audience thanking them for believing in the MILLIONSTARS. Team8th then performs their debut song, "REFRAIN REL@TION", with the rest of the MILLIONSTARS joining in. With the conclusion of the concert, all of the MILLIONSTARS celebrate a successful opening night. Afterwards, the MILLIONSTARS begin regular performances at the theater and become famous throughout Japan, ending with the idols of both the MILLIONSTARS and ALLSTARS welcoming the audience to the theater.

=== Comics ===
Aside from comics available alongside the games themselves, Million Live! has several published manga.

A manga adaptation titled The Idolmaster Million Live! was published in Monthly Shōnen Sunday from August 2014 to October 2016, created by author Yuki Monji under the supervision of Bandai Namco Entertainment. The collected volume editions came with original CDs.

Another manga series titled The Idolmaster Million Live! Blooming Clover was published in Dengeki Maoh from February 2017 to October 2023, created by Kakuya Inayama.

== Music ==
Million Live has image songs published by Lantis (later a label for Bandai Namco's Bandai Namco Arts).

The music was integrated into the gameplay of Theater Days.

Sales of the CDs and concert Blu-rays had surpassed a combined one million units by 2017; the CD The@ter Generation 01 Brand New Theater! received a Gold certification from the RIAJ.
