= The Idolmaster Platinum Stars =

2016 simulation video game

- Developers: Bandai Namco Studios; Tri-Crescendo
- Publishers: JP: Bandai Namco Entertainment; KO: Bandai Namco Entertainment Korea, Intragames
- Director: Akihiro Ishihara
- Producer: Yōzō Sakagami
- Series: The Idolmaster
- Platform: PlayStation 4
- Release: JP: July 28, 2016; KO, TW: September 28, 2016
- Genre: Simulation
- Mode: Single-player

The Idolmaster Platinum Stars is a Japanese simulation video game in The Idolmaster series developed and published by Bandai Namco Entertainment. It was released for the PlayStation 4 on July 28, 2016. A Traditional Chinese and Korean version of the game was released on September 28, 2016.

== Gameplay ==
The player acts as a producer in 765 Production. Unlike previous works in the Idolmaster series, the storyline is reconstructed and has no connection with other works. However, the idols' personalities and looks remain unchanged.

In the game, 765 Production is a small-scale talent agency. The manager decides to hold a training camp for the idols. The player is the producer, and he is required to communicate with idols and lead their training to go to the final stage.

== Development ==
At the 2013 SCEJA Press Conference, Bandai Namco Entertainment announced that a PlayStation 4 Idolmaster game would be made. Afterwards, a game promotion video was played at The Idolmaster Master of Idol World!! concert in July 2015. In January 2016, Famitsu revealed the name of the video game, and announced that 60% of the game had been developed.

== Reception ==
The game received a score of 34 out of 40 from the Japanese video game magazine Famitsu.
