= The Idolmaster Cinderella Girls =

Mobile game by Cygames and Bandai Namco

- Promotional image of the anime featuring (from left to right): Rin Shibuya, Uzuki Shimamura and Mio Honda

アイドルマスター シンデレラガールズ (Aidorumasutā Shinderera Gāruzu)
- Genre: Idol
- Created by: Bandai Namco Entertainment
- Video game
- Developer: Cygames; Bandai Namco Studios
- Publisher: Bandai Namco Entertainment
- Genre: Simulation, social network game
- Platform: Mobage (iOS, Android, Google Chrome)
- Released: JP: November 28, 2011 – March 30, 2023 (11 years, 4 months and 2 days)
- Anime television series
- Directed by: Noriko Takao
- Written by: Noriko Takao; Tatsuya Takahashi; Chikai Nagai; Gō Zappa; Yuniko Ayana; Michihiro Tsuchiya
- Music by: Hidekazu Tanaka (Monaca)
- Studio: A-1 Pictures
- Licensed by: Crunchyroll (streaming)
- Original network: Tokyo MX, Chiba TV, Gunma TV, Gifu Broadcasting System, KBS Kyoto, BS11, Sun TV, Mie TV, TV Saitama, Tochigi TV, TV Kanagawa, TVQ Kyushu Broadcasting
- English network: SEA: Aniplus Asia
- Original run: January 10, 2015 – October 17, 2015
- Episodes: 25 + OVA
- Anime television series

The Idolmaster Cinderella Girls Theater
- Directed by: Mankyū
- Written by: Mankyū
- Studio: Gathering
- Licensed by: Crunchyroll (streaming)
- Original network: Tokyo MX, BS11, Saga TV
- Original run: April 4, 2017 – June 25, 2019
- Episodes: 52
- Original net animation

The Idolmaster Cinderella Girls Spin-off!
- Directed by: Naoki Yoshibe
- Studio: Orange
- Licensed by: Amazon Prime Video
- Released: November 10, 2019
- Runtime: 6 minutes
- Original net animation

The Idolmaster Cinderella Girls Theater Extra Stage
- Directed by: Mankyū
- Written by: Mankyū
- Studio: Zero-G
- Released: March 24, 2020 – April 13, 2021
- Episodes: 48
- Video game
- The Idolmaster Cinderella Girls: Starlight Stage
- Related
- The Idolmaster Cinderella Girls U149
- icon

The Idolmaster Cinderella Girls (アイドルマスター シンデレラガールズ, Aidorumasutā Shinderera Gāruzu; officially stylized as THE iDOLM@STER CINDERELLA GIRLS) is a Japanese free-to-play simulation video game co-developed by Cygames and Bandai Namco Studios for the Mobage social network platform for mobile phones. It was first released on November 28, 2011, for feature phones, and compatibility was extended to iOS and Android devices on December 16, 2011. The game is based on The Idolmaster franchise, and features a cast of new idol characters. In September 2015, a music video game developed by Cygames titled The Idolmaster Cinderella Girls: Starlight Stage was released on the Google Play Store and Apple Store in Japan. The original game ended service on March 30, 2023, and was succeeded by its spinoff game and adaptations.

The story in Cinderella Girls follows the career of a producer in charge of leading and training prospective pop idols to stardom. Its gameplay follows a digital collectible card game format in which each idol is represented as a card, which the player may use to form a unit of idols to train in lessons, take to jobs, and compete against opponents. Cinderella Girls has made transitions to other media. An anime television series adaptation produced by A-1 Pictures aired in Japan between January 10 and October 17, 2015, and was simulcast by Daisuki. It was followed by a 3-minute short chibi slice of life anime series produced by Gathering that has been running since 2017. Various manga series, three sets of manga anthologies, two Internet radio talk shows featuring the series' voice actresses, image song singles and albums, and live concerts have also been produced.

== Premise ==
The game and series takes place at the 346 Pro talent agency, where a producer is raising a group of idols to stardom in what is known as "The Cinderella Project". The anime follows three such girls, Rin Shibuya, Uzuki Shimamura, and Mio Honda, along with their fellow idols, as they become part of the Cinderella Project.

== Gameplay ==
An example of gameplay in Cinderella Girls depicting Uzuki Shimamura finishing up work

Cinderella Girls is a free-to-play, simulation social network game based on The Idolmaster franchise. Like its forerunners The Idolmaster and The Idolmaster 2, the player assumes the role of a talent producer who is in charge of training prospective pop idols on their way to stardom. Idols are represented in the game as collectible cards divided into three categories: cute, cool, and passion. The player begins by choosing one of the three categories, and they will then receive an idol belonging to the category. Each idol has several statistics points that influence gameplay: attack, defense, cost, and affection rate; each idol is also designated one of three rarities: normal, rare, or S rare, all of which also have a "plus" variant.

There are several activities which the player may take their idols to participate in, such as work, live battles, and lessons. Work are jobs that the producer and idols can take in different regions of Japan. During a job, the player earns in-game money and fans, receives new idols or costumes, and may also increase an idol's affection rate. As work progresses, the player also earns experience points and increases their producer level. The amount of progress the player may make at a given time is limited by the amount of stamina they have, which depletes during work. To continue working after the stamina has been completely depleted, the player must either wait for the stamina gauge to replenish over time or use in-game items. The amount of stamina the player has is determined by their producer level, but it can also be increased by allocating earned bonus points. After completing a number of jobs in an area, the player and idols are occasionally challenged by a computer-controlled rival idol. To finish working in the area, the player must compete against this opponent with the idol that they have chosen as the leader. By defeating the rival idol, the player receives the idol's corresponding card or in-game items.

Live battle is an asynchronous multiplayer gameplay mode in which the player can compete against other players on the Mobage platform. To initiate live battles against other players, the player must first assemble an idol unit for attacking. The player can add a maximum of five idols to their unit, but only the first idols whose costs are cumulatively equal to or lower than the player's attacking cost limit are played during battle. Like stamina, the player's cost allowance is determined by their producer level, but it can also be increased by allocating additional points. If the player has cost remaining in the unit, then additional idols whose cost can fit the gap are played as back members. In order to win the live battle, the player must obtain a higher score—determined by the idol units' total attack, defense, and skills—than their opponent. By defeating his or her opponent, the player earns additional fans and money, and receives a costume from the opponent. Similarly, the player may assemble a unit for defense, which is limited by the player's total defending cost. For either units, the player may add the same idol character to the unit more than once, but the same idol card is only permitted once.

To raise the attack and defense competency of an idol, the player can have her participate in lessons. To participate in a lesson, the player must first choose up to ten other idols as lesson partners, who will then be removed from the player's roster in exchange for raising the level, attack, and defense of the idol who partakes in the lesson. The player can also increase an idol's attack and defense by raising her affection rate to the maximum. Lastly, the player can choose to participate in training, and combine two identical idols to obtain her "plus" variant.

== Development and release ==
The Idolmaster Cinderella Girls was developed by Cygames for DeNA's Mobage social network platform for mobile phones. It was first announced on October 14, 2011, under the tentative title "Idolmaster Social Game", and pre-registration for the game was opened to the public on November 16, 2011. It was first released on November 28, 2011, for Japanese feature phones, and compatibility was extended to Android and iOS devices as a web application on December 16, 2011. To commemorate the game's third anniversary, native applications for Android and iOS were respectively released on November 17 and November 25, 2014. A Google Chrome App version for the Google Chrome browser was also released on October 28, 2015. The game was later released in South Korea for the Daum Mobage platform as an application for Android devices on December 2, 2014, and it featured a new idol character exclusive to the version. The Korean language version of the game shut down on March 14, 2016.

In May 2012, the Consumer Affairs Agency determined that the "complete gacha" (コンプガチャ, konpu gacha) gameplay mechanic's usage in social network games violated Japanese law, and announced it would issue a request to DeNA and other social game platforms for its removal. Cinderella Girls was cited as an example of a game that employed the tactic. The mechanism was later removed from the game, following separate announcements by DeNA and Bandai Namco that the companies would cease its usage in their social games.

== Related media ==
=== Manga ===
Cinderella Girls has received several manga adaptations since its service commenced. A five-panel comic strip manga by Kuma-Jet, titled Cinderella Girls Gekijō (シンデレラガールズ劇場), began its serialization in the Cinderella Girls video game in March 2012. The comic strips have been collected into multiple tankōbon volumes published by ASCII Media Works with its first volume published on January 27, 2015; its 11th volume was released on September 26, 2019.

The first manga series adaptation, titled The Idolmaster Cinderella Girls New Generations (アイドルマスターシンデレラガールズ ニュージェネレーションズ), was illustrated by Namo, and focuses on the characters Uzuki Shimamura, Rin Shibuya, and Mio Honda. It was serialized in Square Enix's shōnen manga magazine Gangan Joker between its October 2012 and November 2013 issues. The chapters were later collected into two tankōbon volumes released on April 25 and November 25, 2013. A second manga series, titled The Idolmaster Cinderella Girls Rockin' Girl (アイドルマスター シンデレラガールズ ロッキングガール), was illustrated by Hamachon, and centers on the characters Riina Tada, Kanako Mimura, and Rika Jōgasaki. The manga was serialized in Square Enix's seinen manga magazine Monthly Big Gangan between its October 2012 and April 2017 issues with frequent hiatuses, and the first tankōbon volume was released on April 25, 2013.

A four-panel comic strip manga adaptation, titled The Idolmaster Cinderella Girls Ensemble! (アイドルマスター シンデレラガールズ あんさんぶる!) and illustrated by Sadoru Chiba and written by Haruki Kashiba for seinen manga magazine Young Gangan, was serialized in the magazine's 22nd issue for 2012 until its 6th issue for 2016. Three tankōbon volumes were published by Square Enix between November 25, 2013, and April 25, 2016. This was followed by two four-panel comic strip manga adaptations by Saya Kiyoshi for Big Gangan, titled The Idolmaster Cinderella Girls: Idol of the Day (アイドルマスター シンデレラガールズ 本日のアイドルさん, Aidorumasutā Shinderera Gāruzu: Honjitsu no Aidoru-san) and Honjitsu no Dereradi-san (本日のデレラジさん, Honjitsu no Dereraji-san); the latter series follows the characters featured in the Internet radio show of the same name. The two series were serialized in Big Gangan between the twelfth volume of 2012 and the eighth volume of 2013, and were collected into a tankōbon volume released on November 25, 2013. Another four-panel comic strip series, titled The Idolmaster Cinderella Girls Dereradisan, was illustrated by Ajiichi for the manga website Gangan Online. The series also follows the Internet radio show's characters, and began serialization on the website on September 12, 2013.

Cinderella Girls has also inspired several sets of manga anthologies illustrated by a multitude of different artists. The first manga anthology, titled The Idolmaster Cinderella Girls Shuffle!!, was regularly serialized on Gangan Online between August 2 and November 8, 2012, and was serialized irregularly thereafter. Its first volume was released on April 25, 2013. A six-volume anthology series, titled The Idolmaster Cinderella Girls Comic Anthology, was published by Ichijinsha between October 25, 2012, and October 31, 2013. The series devoted two volumes to each image category in the game: Cute, Cool and Passion, and each category's second anthology was also bundled with a drama CD written by Tatsuya Takahashi.

Age-focused manga series have since been published based on the game: The Idolmaster Cinderella Girls U149, a web manga written and illustrated by Kyono and published by Cygames' Cycomics division which focuses on a cast of idols aged 9 to 12 (Miria Akagi, Arisu Tachibana, Risa Matoba, Koharu Koga, Nina Ichihara, Kaoru Ryuzaki and Haru Yuuki) and their producer and began serialization on October 15, 2016; and The Idolmaster Cinderella Girls After20, written and illustrated by Han Nigō and also published by Cycomics which focuses on a cast aged 20 and up (Miyu Mifune, Kaede Takagaki, Mizuki Kawashima, Shino Hiiragi and Sanae Katagiri) as they eat food and drink beers, and began serialization on December 23, 2017.

=== Anime ===
The first anime adaptation of Cinderella Girls was the music video for the song "Onegai! Cinderella". The music video was produced to commemorate the game's second anniversary, and it was streamed within the game on November 28, 2013. The music video was later included in the Blu-ray and DVD The Idolmaster Cinderella Girls: Animation First Set, released on November 5, 2014.

An anime television series adaptation was first announced at the concert "The Idolmaster Cinderella Girls 1st Live Wonderful Magic!!" on April 5, 2014. The anime was produced by the animation studio A-1 Pictures and directed by Noriko Takao, who, with writer Tatsuya Takahashi, shared supervision duty for the series screenplay, and Yūsuke Matsuo based the character designs on designs provided by illustrator Annin Dōfu; the music was composed by Hidekazu Tanaka of Monaca. The series aired in Japan on BS11 via satellite, and Tokyo MX and nine other local independent terrestrial stations between January 10 and April 11, 2015, and was simulcast on Daisuki. The series aired in split seasons, with the second season having aired between July 17 and October 17, 2015. An original video animation episode was shipped with the ninth DVD and Blu-ray compilation volume on February 25, 2016. The opening theme is "Star!!" by Cinderella Project, a group composed of Uzuki Shimamura (Ayaka Ōhashi), Rin Shibuya (Ayaka Fukuhara), Mio Honda (Sayuri Hara), Miria Akagi (Tomoyo Kurosawa), Anastasia (Sumire Uesaka), Chieri Ogata (Naomi Ōzora), Ranko Kanzaki (Maaya Uchida), Rika Jōgasaki (Nozomi Yamamoto), Riina Tada (Ruriko Aoki), Minami Nitta (Aya Suzaki), Anzu Futaba (Hiromi Igarashi), Miku Maekawa (Natsumi Takamori), Kanako Mimura (Yuka Ōtsubo) and Kirari Moroboshi (Rei Matsuzaki).

An anime television series adaptation of Kuma-Jet's Cinderella Girls Theater spin-off manga, produced by Gathering and directed by Mankyū, was announced on November 28, 2016, as part of the game's 5th anniversary via a 3-minute short film distributed online and premiered its first season which ran from April 4 to June 27, 2017. The series was then renewed for three more seasons, with the second season premiering on October 3, 2017, the third running from July 3 to September 25, 2018 and the fourth, titled Climax Season, from April 2 to June 25, 2019. In February 2020, a new anime spun off from Theater titled Extra Stage was announced and was streamed exclusively in both the Cinderella Girls and Starlight Stage mobile games from March 24, 2020, to April 13, 2021. Extra Stage ran for 48 episodes and Mankyū returned to direct the series. This time, production moved from Gathering to Zero-G.

On November 10, 2019, a promotional animated 6-minute short film, titled Spin-off!, was announced at the concert "The Idolmaster Cinderella Girls 7th Live Tour Special 3chord Funky Dancing!". The short was directed by Naoki Yoshibe and produced by Orange in cooperation with Amazon Prime Video, Cygames, karaoke equipment manufacturer Daiichi Kosho Company and Nissin Foods. The theme song of the short is "Oumuamua ni Kōun o" by Shiki Ichinose (Kotomi Aihara), Shin Sato (Yumiri Hanamori), Risa Matoba (Hana Tamegai), Nao Kamiya (Eriko Matsui) and Chitose Kurosaki (Kaoru Sakura). It premiered on Amazon Prime Video on the same day as its announcement. The short marks the eighth anniversary of the franchise. The full film was released on YouTube on December 8, 2019, by Bandai Namco Entertainment.

An anime television series adaptation of Kyono's Cinderella Girls U149 manga was announced during the final concert in "The Idolmaster Cinderella Girls 10th Anniversary Magical Wonderland!!!" tour on April 3, 2022. It was produced by CygamesPictures and directed by Manabu Okamoto, who was also the sound director, with Hiroyuki Takashima served as assistant director, Oki Murayama handled the scripts, Norie Igawa designed the characters for animation, Nippon Columbia produced the music, and Makoto Miyazaki composed the music score. The series aired from April 6 to June 29, 2023, on TV Tokyo and other networks. U149 performed the opening theme song "Shine In The Sky☆". Crunchyroll streamed the series. Plus Media Networks Asia to carried the anime in Southeast Asia, to be premiered on Aniplus Asia.

== Reception ==
In September 2012, the Nikkei Shimbun reported that Cinderella Girls earns over 1 billion yen in monthly revenue. The game currently has a playerbase of at least 4.6 million players.
