= The Idolmaster One For All =

2014 simulation video game

- Developer(s): Bandai Namco Studios
- Publisher(s): Bandai Namco Games
- Director(s): Akihiro Ishihara; Munehiro Koyanagi
- Producer(s): Yōzō Sakagami; Masataka Katō
- Series: The Idolmaster
- Platform(s): PlayStation 3
- Release: JP: May 15, 2014
- Genre(s): Raising simulation, Rhythm
- Mode(s): Single-player

The Idolmaster One For All (アイドルマスター ワンフォーオール, Aidorumasutā Wan Fō Ōru, officially stylized as THE iDOLM@STER ONE FOR ALL) is a Japanese raising simulation video game in The Idolmaster series developed by Bandai Namco Studios and published by Bandai Namco Games. It was released in Japan on May 15, 2014, for the PlayStation 3. The story in One For All is told from the perspective of a producer in charge of leading and training a group of pop idols to stardom. Its gameplay, while most similar to its predecessor The Idolmaster 2, features several improvements and differences, and allows players to produce all 13 idols from 765 Production, the main talent agency featured in the series.

Planning for the game centered on the use of "all for one and one for all" as the game's theme. The office environment was redesigned to give it a more natural feeling, and a focus was put on "returning to the starting point" in The Idolmaster series with One For All centered on growing alongside novice idols in a small talent agency. One For All sold 83,395 copies in its first week of release in Japan, and ranked as the best-selling video game in Japan that week.

== Gameplay ==
The Idolmaster One For All is a raising simulation game in which the player assumes the role of a producer who works at 765 Production (765 Pro), a talent agency that represents 13 pop idols who recently made their debuts but have yet to make an impact in the industry. At the beginning of the game, the player meets Junjirō Takagi, 765 Pro's president, and is tasked with initially choosing to produce one of the agency's idols: Haruka Amami, Chihaya Kisaragi, Yukiho Hagiwara, Yayoi Takatsuki, Ritsuko Akizuki, Azusa Miura, Iori Minase, Makoto Kikuchi, Ami and Mami Futami, Miki Hoshii, Hibiki Ganaha, and Takane Shijō. The player and the selected idol are also tasked by Takagi to satisfy objectives over the course of 12-week long seasons, the first of which is spring. By the fourth week, the player is allowed to produce three idols together as an idol unit. Satisfying an objective by the end of a given season will increase the player's producer rank, which allows the player to produce additional idols and have access to more songs, among other features. The unit's vocal, dance, and visual competency is represented by three statistic points called image points. Each idol's level is tied to her experience points, but this is unrelated to an idol's individual rank. An idol earns experience points from doing promotional work or stage performances.

The game depicts the idols' activities of each in-game week. At the beginning of each week, the player organizes the idols' schedule, which includes activities such as lessons, consultations, promotional work, stage performances and shopping for costumes and accessories. Each activity costs and reimburses the player varying amounts of in-game money, though only the promotional work or stage performances will result in the end an in-game week. The lessons are instructional sessions that idols partake to temporarily raise their image points for one in-game week, and are in the form of three minigames. Each lesson type corresponds to one of the three image categories: vocal, dance, and visual. Each lesson is timed, and the idols' overall performance in the lesson is ranked as bad, normal, good, or perfect. During consultations, the player is given multiple responses to choose from over the course of a conversation with an idol. The player's choices affect how well or poorly the communication is received—ranging from bad to normal, good, and perfect communication, and this in turn affects the idol's memory count. This communication aspect is also featured during promotional work, which are jobs that the producer and the idols can take to further their popularity in specific regions. The jobs can either compensate or cost the unit with in-game money, and earn the idols differing numbers of fans in the region the job is conducted in. The player can also shop for additional costumes and accessories.

In addition to the auditions found in previous Idolmaster simulation games, the idols can also perform by participating in music festivals and live performances. These three types of performances are together referred to as stage performances, and share the same basic gameplay with differences in their conditions of completion. To successfully pass an audition, the player and idols must receive a passing ranking among the auditioning units, while a predetermined rating representing the audience's excitement must be achieved to successfully complete a live performance. In a festival, the player and idols compete against a computer-controlled opponent, and must obtain a higher score than the opponent to successfully complete the festival. Similar to games in the rhythm genre, stage performances' gameplay takes place as the player listens to the idols performing a song. During the performance, the player must guide the idols to appeal to the judge or audience in the three image categories by continuously pressing buttons that correspond to the categories along to the rhythm of the song. The player and the idols are scored by the accuracy of these presses in timing, for which he or she is given one of four ratings: Perfect, Good, Normal, and Bad. The points that each appeal rewards is dependent on the idols' statistics and the song's tempo. The points of each appeal are also multiplied by the category's interest rate, which represents the audience's interest in the image category and increases or decreases as the idols continue to appeal in other categories or the same category.

The idols' performance are also represented by the voltage meter, which increases as the player successfully hits a note. The player also has the option to use memory appeals to reset each image's interest rate and receive a boost in the score and voltage. The player can use as many memory appeals as the idols' memory count. Once the voltage meter is completely filled, the player can choose an idol to activate a burst appeal. During a burst appeal, the player must follow a sequence of specific image appeals, which are given an adjusted, higher than average interest rate. This also halts the opponent's ability to use appeals, and causes a reduction in his or her voltage meter. After the burst appeal, the voltage meter is reset, and the voltage meter must be filled again before another burst can be used. Special items called amulets can also be purchased and used to adjust gameplay elements, such as reducing the interest rates' deterioration rate. If the idols pass an audition, the unit is chosen to do a televised performance of the song previously chosen, while an encore is given if a festival or live performance is successfully completed. The performances serve to increase the number of fans the unit has in the region it is held or in all regions in the case of national broadcasts.

In addition to the normal live performances, all 13 idols hold an All Star Live concert at the end of the summer and winter seasons. The idols are split into three groups, two groups of five and one group of three, and if successfully completed, a pre-rendered encore performance is shown featuring a different song and costumes. If necessary conditions are met, the player is also allowed to take part in a Rank Up festival with the intention of increasing an idol's rank. While fundamentally similar to the normal festivals, the player must defeat the opponent twice using two different songs to successfully complete the festival. Once an idol achieves an idol rank of A3 or above, the player is allowed to take part in the Idol Extreme music festival; the highest idol rank is A1. Whenever an idol's level or idol rank increases, they receive skill points, which can be used to augment an idol's abilities by choosing from available skills on the skill board. This includes such actions as raising vocal, dance and visual parameters, increasing the speed at which the voltage meter is filled, and strengthening the effect of memory appeals.

== Development and release ==
The Idolmaster One For All was developed by Bandai Namco Games and directed by Akihiro Ishihara and Munehiro Koyanagi. Bandai Namco Games producer Yōzō Sakagami explains that planning for the game began with the decision to use "all for one and one for all" as the game's theme. In doing so, he wanted to put more of a focus on the 765 Production (765 Pro) headquarters, especially after hearing comments from fans who found it relaxing to watch the idols talk among themselves at the 765 Pro office. This led to the office environment to be redesigned to give it a more natural feeling. The game's opening menu screen also features the 765 Pro office to further immerse the player in the game's atmosphere. The development team attempted to focus on "returning to the starting point" in The Idolmaster series with One For All. Sakagami explains that the true charm of The Idolmaster is to grow alongside novice idols centered on a small talent agency, and he goes on to say that the direction One For All took was in depicting the "warmth" that goes along with "765 Pro as the starting point".

The gameplay in One For All was changed from previous Idolmaster installments to remove the restriction of only allowing the player to produce a given idol or idol unit for a period of one year, which is something Sakagami admits he had wanted to do something about for quite some time. Compared to the gameplay in The Idolmaster 2 which is noted as not allowing the player much room to view the promotional work or communication aspects of the game, Sakagami wanted to design a game where players could take their time and take various detours throughout the game. Sakagami goes on to say that he wanted to remove the one year time limitation because of his strong desire to allow players the chance to produce the idols until they would be satisfied. Another focus for Sakagami was the desire for players to experience all of the idols instead of just their favorites, so the gameplay was adjusted to only allow the player to choose one of the 13 available idols to produce at the beginning of the game. Via more idols becoming available to produce as gameplay continues, Sakagami had the idea to let the player experience the fun of producing an idol group as it gradually grows and develops.

In wanting to adopt a factor directly tied to an idol's growth, One For All was designed to show the number of experience points earned from the idols doing jobs such as promotional work, auditions and live performances. One For All also introduces a skill board system, which gives skill points to idols whenever they level up. The idea for this system is derived from the use of amulets in The Idolmaster 2 which adjust gameplay elements, and skill points work in a similar fashion. Sakagami also wanted to better convey the personal growth of the producer, leading to the creation of the season objective system, which grants the player additional functionality such as new songs or the ability to produce more idols simultaneously. Despite the new additions to the gameplay system, Sakagami believes the gameplay itself is simple enough that new fans to The Idolmaster series will still be able to enjoy it.

One For All was released by Bandai Namco Games in Japan for the PlayStation 3 on May 15, 2014, in limited and regular editions, as well as for download through the PlayStation Store. The limited edition release comes in a specially made box containing the game itself, a drama CD, a product code to obtain original costumes as downloadable content (DLC), a business pamphlet for the 765 Pro idols, a 765 Pro calendar, a cleaning cloth featuring aphorisms from 765 Pro's president Junjirō Takagi, 13 posters featuring the 765 Pro idols, and two serial numbers to obtain one rare card each for use in the social network games The Idolmaster Cinderella Girls and The Idolmaster Million Live!. Bandai Namco Games began releasing DLC updates on May 15, 2014, available through the PlayStation Store. The updates include things such as new songs, costumes, accessories, and special guest idols who perform songs in the Stage For You game mode.

One For All features 21 songs written and composed by a variety of songwriters. As of September 2014, an additional 34 songs were released in DLC packs. Three songs were originally introduced in One For All: "Acceleration" (アクセルレーション), "Destiny" and "Only My Note". However, "Acceleration" is limited to being sung by the rival idol Leon. The songs were released on an album titled The Idolmaster Master Artist 3: Only My Note on August 27, 2014, which also includes songs released in DLC packs.

== Reception ==
One For All sold 83,395 copies in its first week of release in Japan, and ranked as the best-selling video game in Japan that week. The Mainichi Shimbun reported that one day after the game's release, both the limited and regular editions were already sold out of stores in Akihabara. Within the first week, the game sold through 92.56% of its initial shipment. By June 1, 2014, the game had sold 102,793 copies. The game received a score of 33 out of 40 from the Japanese video game magazine Famitsu.
