= The Idolmaster =

Japanese media franchise

- Genres: Raising simulation, music, rhythm, business simulation
- Developers: Metro; Bandai Namco Studios; Cygames; QualiArts; ILCA
- Publishers: Namco; Bandai Namco Entertainment
- Platforms: Arcade, Xbox 360, PlayStation Portable, PlayStation 3, Nintendo DS, Mobile phone, Windows, iOS, Android, PlayStation Vita, PlayStation 4
- First release: The Idolmaster; July 26, 2005
- Latest release: Gakuen Idolmaster; May 16, 2024

The Idolmaster (Note: Japanese: アイドルマスター, Hepburn: Aidorumasutā; officially stylized as THE iDOLM@STER) is a Japanese media franchise that began in 2005 with a raising simulation and rhythm video game series created by Bandai Namco Entertainment (formerly Namco). The series primarily centers on the career of a producer who works with a group of young women who are aspiring or established idols at the talent agency 765 Production. Originally released as an arcade game, the franchise has grown to numerous ports, sequels and spin-offs across multiple video game consoles, including several social network games. The franchise includes a variety of other media such as anime series, printed media, audio dramas, a Korean drama, and radio shows.

== Common elements ==
=== Plot and themes ===
Cast of The Idolmaster showing the main characters of the anime series which adapts the first game of the franchise

The central aspect of the plot for The Idolmaster deals with the training of prospective pop idols on their way to stardom. The main talent agency featured in the series is 765 Production (765 Pro), a rising studio located in a small office. Other studios include 876 Production (876 Pro), 961 Production (961 Pro), 346 Production (346 Pro), 315 Production (315 Pro) and 283 Production (283 Pro). At 765 Pro, there are initially 10 idols the player can choose: Haruka Amami, Chihaya Kisaragi, Yukiho Hagiwara, Yayoi Takatsuki, Ritsuko Akizuki, Azusa Miura, Iori Minase, Makoto Kikuchi, and Ami and Mami Futami (who work as a pair). Three additional idols later added to 765 Pro include: Miki Hoshii, Hibiki Ganaha and Takane Shijō.

A recurring theme in the series emphasizes the struggles an idol must go through to achieve stardom. This is indicated by the level of an idol's tension meter. Games in the series also explore relationships between characters, ranging from the relationship that develops between an idol and a producer, to the rivalry between idols and production studios.

=== Gameplay ===
In the main series of games, the player usually assumes the role of a producer who is put in charge of one or more idols as a part of a raising simulation. The player is initially put in charge of a single idol, but this can increase to more idols once the player gains enough experience as a producer. The player starts by arranging the idol's daily schedule, which gives the player a large amount of freedom on what the idol does, including giving the idol the day off. The schedule includes time for the producer to communicate with the idol, take them to jobs, train them during lessons, and offer directions during auditions and performances until they reach the top spot in the entertainment industry. However, the schedule choices in the original arcade game are limited to doing a lesson or taking an audition. Training an idol has the player going through a variety of lessons in the form of minigames. These lessons serve to increase an idol's statistics in vocal, dance and visual image. The number and type of lessons change over the series; for example, there are five in the original arcade game, six in The Idolmaster SP, and three in The Idolmaster 2. The other aspect of the game which increases an idol's statistics depends on their costumes and accessories.

In the communication phase between the producer and an idol, text progression pauses when the player is given multiple responses to choose from over the course of a conversation and the player is given a limited amount of time to make a choice, though the player can pause the game to be given more time. Depending on which choice is made will affect how well or poorly the communication is received. As mutual trust builds between idol and producer, good memories are formed which help the idol in auditions. In contrast, if bad memories are formed through poor communication, this will adversely affect an idol. This communication is further expanded in The Idolmaster SP with the introduction of a promise system. The communication phase is supplemented by the idol taking on various jobs to further her exposure and gain fans.

The audition phase is the main way for an idol to climb the idol rankings by gaining fans. The audition process involves another series of minigames, which allow the player to appeal to the judges or audience by earning points in the vocal, dance and visual categories. If an idol passes the audition, she is chosen to do a televised public performance. In later games, during the performance, the player is able to influence the idol by giving directions. The same gameplay in the audition process is also used during live concerts and festivals. The player can check the idol's rank, how many fans she has gained, and how much her singles have sold.

== Game series ==
Release timeline
2005	The Idolmaster (arcade)
2005	The Idolmaster Happening Location
2006
2007	The Idolmaster (Xbox 360)
2008	The Idolmaster Live For You!
2009	The Idolmaster SP
2009	The Idolmaster Dearly Stars
2010	The Idolmaster Mobile
2011	The Idolmaster 2
2011	The Idolmaster Gravure For You!
2011	The Idolmaster Cinderella Girls
2012	The Idolmaster mobile i
2012	The Idolmaster Live in Slot
2012	The Idolmaster Shiny Festa
2013	The Idolmaster Million Live!
2013	The Idolmaster Shiny TV
2014	The Idolmaster SideM
2014	The Idolmaster One For All
2015	The Idolmaster Cinderella Girls Gravure For You!
2015	The Idolmaster Cinderella Girls: Starlight Stage
2015	The Idolmaster Must Songs
2016	The Idolmaster Platinum Stars
2016	The Idolmaster Cinderella Girls: Viewing Revolution
2017	The Idolmaster Million Live!: Theater Days
2017	The Idolmaster SideM: Live on Stage!
2017	The Idolmaster Stella Stage
2018	The Idolmaster Shiny Colors
2019
2020
2021	The Idolmaster Poplinks
2021	The Idolmaster SideM: Growing Stars
2021	The Idolmaster Starlit Season
2022
2023	The Idolmaster Shiny Colors Song for Prism
2024	Gakuen Idolmaster
2025	The Idolmaster Tours

=== Early years ===
The Idolmaster, the first game of the series, was first released in Japan on July 26, 2005, as an arcade game using Namco Bandai Games' Namco System 246 arcade system board. Developed by Metro, it introduced many gameplay and plot themes common to the franchise. The player assumes the role of a novice producer who works with prospective pop idols through lessons, auditions and performances. The player can also develop a relationship between an idol and her producer. The game uses the touchscreen Rewritable Stage arcade cabinet, which issues the player two rewritable cards containing the player's profile and save data. It also makes use of the ALL.Net network service to keep track of national idol rankings. The network was discontinued on September 1, 2010, though a few of the arcade cabinets still survive.

A port of the arcade game for the Xbox 360 was released on January 25, 2007. This version introduced an additional idol, Miki Hoshii, and includes new songs. The port makes use of Xbox Live, and the game has been credited with making Japan's ratio of sign-ups for Xbox Live compared to the number of consoles sold as the world's highest. Over four times as many Microsoft points were sold on the date of The Idolmaster's Xbox 360 release as on the date before it. A sequel to the arcade game titled The Idolmaster Live For You! for the Xbox 360 was released on February 28, 2008. In Live For You!, the player assumes the role of a "special producer" due to the sudden absence of the original producer and is charged with coordinating the idols' concerts. The game focuses mainly on the concert coordination aspect of the original and expands on it in many ways, with higher customization of the stage, costumes and songs. Live For You! also introduced a rhythm game aspect into the series, incorporating it as a minigame during an idol's concert. A collection containing both The Idolmaster and Live For You! was released on March 12, 2009, as The Idolmaster Twins.

A game titled The Idolmaster SP for the PlayStation Portable was released in three versions on February 19, 2009, titled Perfect Sun, Missing Moon and Wandering Star. SP re-introduces Miki Hoshii as a rival idol working for the 961 Pro studio, and introduces the new characters Hibiki Ganaha and Takane Shijō, also working for 961. Hibiki is in Perfect Sun, Miki is in Missing Moon, and Takane is in Wandering Star. SP also introduces a multiplayer mode for up to three players where each of the players' idols can interact and audition together. A slot machine titled The Idolmaster Live in Slot! was released on May 23, 2012, by Sammy using the Xbox 360 version of The Idolmaster as its motif.

=== 2nd Vision ===
In May 2009, the franchise's next stage called "2nd Vision" was announced, which was described as The Idolmaster's next project that would further expand the series' world. The first 2nd Vision game is The Idolmaster Dearly Stars for the Nintendo DS and was released on September 17, 2009. Instead of playing the role of a producer, the player portrays one of the three idols introduced in Dearly Stars as they enter 876 Pro. In addition to the story mode, the game also features a cheering mode for up to 16 players, and includes wi-fi functionality. The idols from previous The Idolmaster games make appearances in Dearly Stars as already established and popular idols.

Another sequel to the original arcade game titled The Idolmaster 2 was released for the Xbox 360 on February 24, 2011, and later for the PlayStation 3 (PS3) on October 27, 2011. Set in the same universe as Dearly Stars six months after The Idolmaster, the player can choose between most of same idols in addition to Miki, Hibiki and Takane. In The Idolmaster 2, Azusa Miura, Iori Minase and Ami Futami now form an independent unit with Ritsuko Akizuki as their producer. A nine-volume fan disc series titled The Idolmaster Gravure For You! was released for the PS3 from October 27, 2011, to June 28, 2012. Gravure For You! allows the player to give the idols directions while taking gravure photos of them in various poses, costumes and locations.

On October 25, 2012, The Idolmaster Shiny Festa was released for the PlayStation Portable in three versions. Like The Idolmaster SP, the different versions—titled Honey Sound, Funky Note and Groovy Tune—feature different idols from The Idolmaster 2 to work with. Shiny Festa is a rhythm game, and unlike previous games does not feature any raising simulation gameplay. The Shiny Festa games were released on iOS and localized into English on April 22, 2013. The titles of the games were changed for the port: Honey Sound became Harmonic Score, Funky Note became Rhythmic Record and Groovy Tune became Melodic Disc.

An app for the PS3 titled Imas Channel was released on the PlayStation Network on October 2, 2013. The app includes a Shiny TV component which features a PS3 version of Shiny Festa, and the nine Gravure For You! fan discs can also be downloaded via the app. The game The Idolmaster One For All was released on May 15, 2014, for the PS3 and allows players to produce all 13 idols from 765 Pro. A game titled The Idolmaster Platinum Stars for the PlayStation 4 (PS4) was released on July 28, 2016. The Idolmaster Stella Stage was released for the PS4 on December 20, 2017. The Idolmaster Starlit Season, a crossover game featuring idols from the original series, Cinderella Girls, Million Live! and Shiny Colors, was originally planned to release in 2020 for the PS4 and Windows via Steam, but was delayed first to May 27, 2021, due to the COVID-19 pandemic, and then further to October 14, 2021, for quality improvements.

=== 3.0 Vision ===
The franchise's third stage called "3.0 Vision" was announced on December 26, 2022. The following games are considered part of this stage:

- The Idolmaster Shiny Colors Song for Prism (mobile game)
- Gakuen Idolmaster (mobile game)
- The Idolmaster Tours (arcade game)

=== Social network games and spin-offs ===
The first social network game in the series, The Idolmaster Cinderella Girls, was released on the Mobage browser game platform for feature phones on November 28, 2011, and for iOS and Android devices on December 16, 2011. The game features a card battle system and over 100 additional idols, including the 13 idols from 765 Pro. In September 2012, the Nikkei Shimbun reported that Cinderella Girls earns over 1 billion yen in revenue monthly.

The second social network game, The Idolmaster Million Live!, was released on February 27, 2013, on the GREE browser game platform for iOS and Android devices, and feature phones sold by au, NTT DoCoMo and SoftBank. Like Cinderella Girls, the game features a card battle system and another 37 additional idols, which also includes the 13 idols from 765 Pro. GREE officially ended the service on March 19, 2018. A successor game to The Idolmaster Million Live! titled The Idolmaster Million Live! Theater Days was released on June 29, 2017. The game features all 37 Million Live! idols from the preceding game and the 13 765 Pro idols, but also introduces two brand new idols, bringing it up to a total of 52 playable and produceable idols.

The third social network game, The Idolmaster SideM, was released on February 28, 2014, on the Mobage platform for mobile devices. The game features a card battle system similar to the other social network games, but instead focuses on male idols at the talent agency 315 Production, which also includes the three idols formerly from 961 Production. A rhythm game with 3D models titled The Idolmaster SideM: Live On Stage! was released August 17, 2017. A newer game titled The Idolmaster SideM: Growing Stars was released October 6, 2021.

The fourth spin-off, The Idolmaster Shiny Colors was released for Bandai Namco and Drecom's enza platform for HTML5 games on April 24, 2018. An app version was released for iOS and Android on March 13, 2019. The game is an idol raising simulator similar in style to the original games but with no rhythm game elements. This game features a completely new cast, including 25 idols and 3 employees at 283 Production (including the producer).

The fifth spin-off, named Gakuen Idolmaster, was announced on March 5, 2024. The game was released on May 16, 2024.

== Development ==
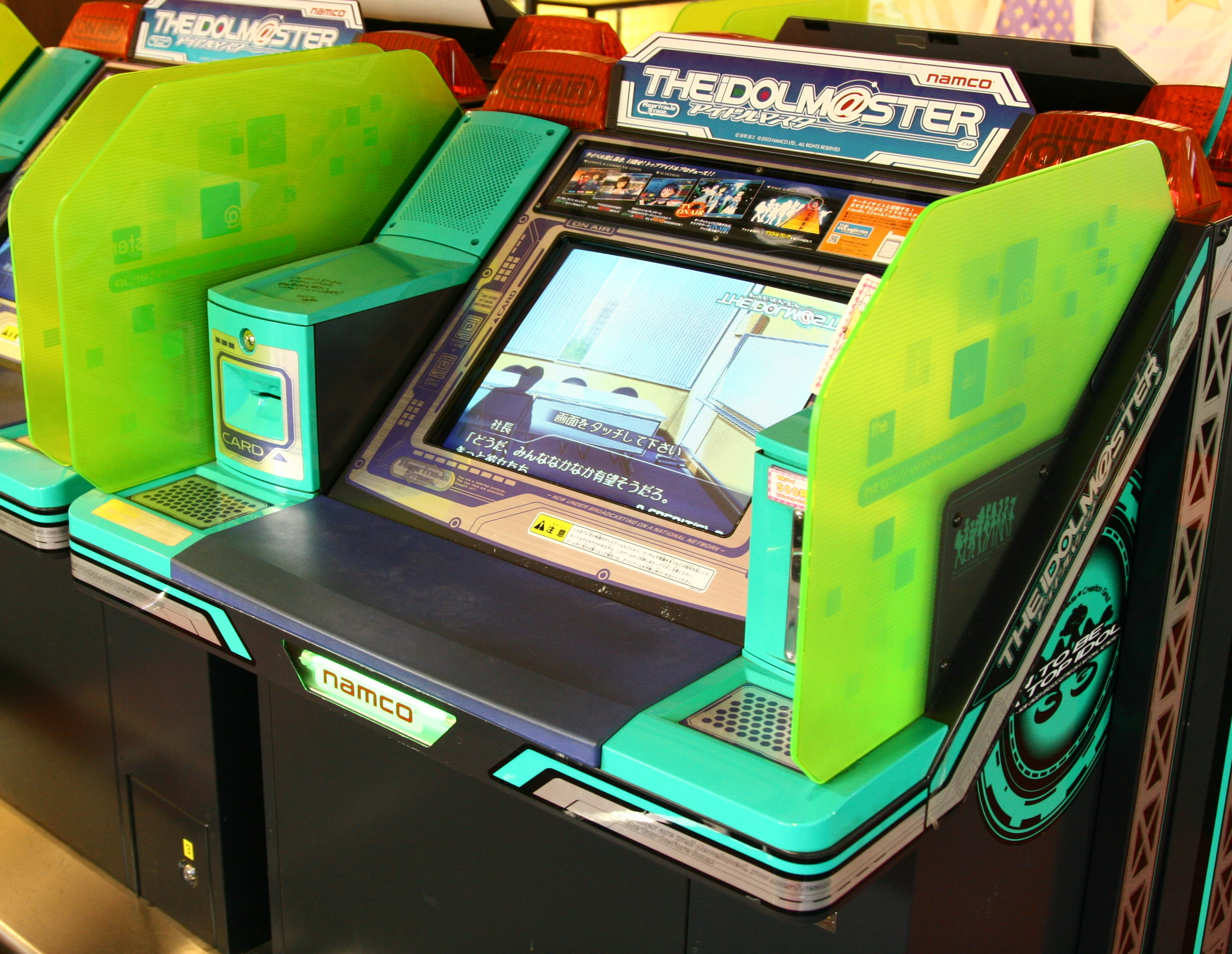
The Idolmaster arcade game cabinet

=== Origin ===
In the early 2000s, there were arcade games already in use that allowed players to save their progress on magnetic stripe cards so as to continue playing later. In 2001, Namco designer Akihiro Ishihara chose to create an arcade game that used that technology. Ishihara wanted to make a game that would make players want to come back to play every day, which would be tied to the growth of video arcades. Ishihara realized that players would need an emotional attachment to the game for them to play it every day. With the target audience to be male players, Ishihara thought that a raising simulation where players could befriend girls and young women would lead players to form a strong emotional attachment for the game. Next, in order to effectively use the competitive culture that surrounds video arcades, Ishihara thought about various themes for the game, including professional wrestling and volleyball. Ishihara finally settled on a game featuring pop idols, who players would raise and compete against other players' idols to reach the top of the entertainment industry. There were some members of Namco that thought it would feel awkward to play The Idolmaster in public and that it would not be well received by players. However, when the game was first tested in arcades, there were long lines of people waiting to play. As word spread and its popularity grew, rival game companies said they had wanted to be the first to create a game like The Idolmaster.

Following the success of the arcade game, Namco Bandai Games went on to develop its Xbox 360 port starting in early 2006, though a port of the game had been discussed as early as May 2005. Namco Bandai Games producer Yōzō Sakagami was initially unsure if The Idolmaster would be suited for a video game console due to hardware and network limitations, but he felt that the Xbox 360 and its Xbox Live network could handle the game's specifications. This would also allow the developers to improve the game's quality and attract attention from those who never played the arcade game. Many people who were interested in the arcade game but never played it would tell Sakagami that this was either because their local arcade did not have The Idolmaster, or because they were embarrassed to play it in public. According to Sakagami, to the development team of the port, there was a large significance in correcting these issues. Their other focus was on allowing players to comfortably play the game and enjoy its various scenarios without the rushed gameplay found in the arcade version. Certain gameplay elements were changed in the port, and this approach to improving and supplementing gameplay elements has continued throughout the series.

=== Design and graphics ===
Most of the core design staff for each game is different, but there are several staff members who have worked for multiple games in the series. The arcade game was directed by Akihiro Ishihara, who also directed The Idolmaster SP and The Idolmaster 2, the latter of which he shared directorship with Masataka Katō. The director for the Xbox 360 port of The Idolmaster is Hiroyuki Onoda. Several returning scenario writers for the series include: Shōgo Sakamoto, Tomoyo Takahashi, Emi Tanaka, Yoshihito Azuma, and Akihiro Ishihara. The original character design was handled by Toshiyuki Kubooka up to The Idolmaster SP. After that, Kiyotaka Tamiya based the character design used in The Idolmatser Dearly Stars and later games on Kubooka's designs.

The graphics of the original arcade game were limited by the Namco System 246 arcade game board released in 2001, which is compatible with a PlayStation 2. Since the arcade game, characters have been rendered using 3D graphics with pre-rendered backgrounds, except during auditions and performances which use a full 3D environment. The developers employ motion capture to present a realistic view of the characters—not only during normal gameplay, but also during performances, which are rendered using motion capture from professional dancers. When developing the Xbox 360 port of The Idolmaster, the characters had to be entirely redone, including the motion capture, which used the same actors as before. Further details were able to be added to the character designs because of the Xbox 360's improved, high-definition hardware.

=== Music ===
The titles in the series feature a variety of music sung by the idols, many of which are featured in multiple games either initially or as downloadable content. The original arcade game has 10 songs, and this is increased to 16 in the Xbox 360 port, as it includes 6 new songs. More songs have continued to be introduced in later games, which include: five in The Idolmaster Live For You!, five in The Idolmaster SP, four in The Idolmaster Dearly Stars, 13 in The Idolmaster 2, and four in The Idolmaster Shiny Festa. Additional songs initially released on various music albums and singles have also been featured in the games, including remix versions of some songs.

== Adaptations ==
- The Idolmaster
- Created by: Bandai Namco Entertainment
- Original video animation

The Idolmaster Live For You!
- Directed by: Keiichiro Kawaguchi
- Studio: Actas
- Released: February 28, 2008
- Runtime: 17 minutes
- Anime television series
- Directed by: Atsushi Nishigori
- Written by: Atsushi Nishigori
- Music by: Ryūichi Takada (Monaca)
- Studio: A-1 Pictures
- Licensed by: Crunchyroll
- Original network: TBS, CBC, MBS, RKB, BS-TBS
- Original run: July 8, 2011 – December 23, 2011
- Episodes: 25 + OVA
- Other series
- List of all The Idolmaster series

=== Anime ===
A 26-episode anime spin-off based on an original concept titled Idolmaster: Xenoglossia, produced by Sunrise and directed by Tatsuyuki Nagai, aired in Japan between April and October 2007 on Kansai TV. The series centers around mecha and reimagines the ten prospective idols as fighter pilots of those robots, with eight of them posing as students. Xenoglossia has only a loose relation to the games, mainly from sharing its characters.

A 17-minute original video animation (OVA) episode titled The Idolmaster Live For You!, produced by Actas and directed by Keiichiro Kawaguchi, was included in the limited edition of Live For You! released on February 28, 2008. The OVA involves Haruka, Chihaya and Miki trying to reach Tokyo in time to catch up with the rest of the girls in their latest concert after the trio gets lost in the middle of nowhere.

A faithful anime television series adaptation, produced by A-1 Pictures and directed by Atsushi Nishigori, aired 25 episodes between July and December 2011 on TBS and other JNN networks across Japan. An OVA episode was released on June 16, 2012. Additional OVA episodes were bundled with the Shiny Festa games released on October 25, 2012, with a different episode for each of the three versions. An anime film adaptation, titled The Idolmaster Movie: Beyond the Brilliant Future!, was released on January 25, 2014

An original net animation adaptation of the spin-off manga by Akane, Puchimas! Petit Idolmaster, was produced by Gathering and directed by Mankyū. The 64 short episodes streamed between January and March 2013. A second season titled Puchimas!! Puchi Puchi Idolmaster streamed 74 episodes between April and June 2014. The series revolves around the 765 Pro idols as they are accompanied by super-deformed versions of themselves. An OVA episode was bundled with ASCII Media Works' Dengeki Maoh magazine in October 2012.

An animated music video of the spin-off game The Idolmaster Cinderella Girls, featuring the song "Onegai! Cinderella", was streamed within the game on November 28, 2013, in celebration of its second anniversary. A special animation video featuring the character Mirai Kasuga was streamed within the spin-off game The Idolmaster Million Live! in commemoration of its first anniversary. An anime television series adaptation of The Idolmaster Cinderella Girls, produced by A-1 Pictures, aired thirteen episodes from January to April 2015. A second season of The Idolmaster Cinderella Girls aired with 12 episodes from July to October 2015 plus an OVA episode released on February 25, 2016.

An anime television series adaptation of the spin-off game The Idolmaster SideM, featuring male characters and also by A-1 Pictures, aired from October to December 2017. An anime television series adaptation of Sumeragi's Wake Atte Mini! spin-off manga, produced by Zero-G and directed by Mankyū, aired from October 9 to December 25, 2018.

An anime television series adaptation of the spin-off game The Idolmaster Million Live!, produced by Shirogumi and directed by Shinya Watada, aired from October to December 2023.

An anime television series adaptation of the spin-off game The Idolmaster Shiny Colors, produced by Polygon Pictures and directed by Mankyuu, aired in 2024.

=== Other media ===
Various guidebooks for the video games and anime adaptations have been published over the years. Two light novels based on The Idolmaster, written by Yūsuke Saitō and illustrated by Otoko, were published by Enterbrain in 2006. Two separate light novels based on Idolmaster: Xenoglossia were published by Fujimi Shobo in 2007 and Hobby Japan in 2008. The Idolmaster has been adapted into 26 serialized manga and several other manga anthologies, which include direct adaptations of the video games and anime adaptations, in addition to numerous spin-offs. The earliest manga was published in 2005 by Ichijinsha, and since then other manga have been published by ASCII Media Works, Enterbrain, Fox Shuppan, Hakusensha, Kadokawa Shoten, Kodansha and Square Enix.

Frontier Works published 12 drama CDs from 2005 to 2009 for the games: six based on the arcade game, three based on its Xbox 360 port, and three based on The Idolmaster SP. Lantis released three drama CDs based on Idolmaster: Xenoglossia in 2007. Frontier Works also published two drama CDs based on Puchimas! Petit Idolmaster in 2011. There have been 15 radio shows for the video games and anime adaptations.

A South Korean drama television series based on the games and titled The Idolmaster KR premiered in 2017, running for 24 hour-long episodes. It is streaming worldwide by Amazon Prime Video as an Amazon Original.

== Reception and legacy ==
=== Commercial reception ===
Each installment of The Idolmaster has seen different levels of success. The Xbox 360 port of The Idolmaster was awarded the special prize at the 2007 Japan Game Awards partially for its unique take on raising simulation games at the time. The Xbox 360 port of The Idolmaster sold 25,000 copies in its first week of sale and was the fifteenth best selling console video game in Japan for the time of its release. The Idolmaster Live For You! would see better success, selling 44,000 units in its first week of sales as the fifth best selling console video game in Japan. In their first week of sales, the three versions of The Idolmaster SP sold 129,088 units. The Idolmaster Dearly Stars sold 30,786 in its first week of sales. The Idolmaster 2 for the Xbox 360 was voted one of the most anticipated future game at the 2010 Tokyo Game Show by attendees. Despite this, the Xbox 360 version of the game initially sold 34,621 units and was the tenth best selling console video game in Japan for the time of its release, but the PlayStation 3 version sold 65,512 units in its first week. The three versions of The Idolmaster Shiny Festa sold 119,132 units in their first week of sales.

The Idolmaster Cinderella Girls earned more than ¥1 billion per month (¥12 billion annually) in Japan during 2012. The Idolmaster Cinderella Girls: Starlight Stage grossed ¥26.6 billion in Japan during 2017, and ¥22.5 billion during 2018. This adds up to at least ¥61.1 billion ($461 million) in mobile game revenue.

Up until 2012, The Idolmaster anime DVD and Blu-ray releases grossed ¥2,275.4 million in Japan, while music CD and concert sales grossed ¥10 billion. In 2013, the franchise grossed ¥1,845.9 million in home media (videos, manga, music, novels) sales. In 2014, anime DVD and Blu-ray sales generated ¥125.6 million. The Idolmaster home media (videos, manga, music, novels) sales earned ¥10,104,641,518 in Japan between 2015 and 2016, and then ¥13,365,945,920 between 2017 and 2018. This adds up to approximately ¥37.717 billion ($351 million) in home media sales revenue, as of 2018.

The Idolmaster Movie: Beyond the Brilliant Future! (2014) grossed $7.84 million in East Asian theaters, including ¥772,973,700 ($7.65 million) in Japan and ₩212,428,000 ($187,797) in South Korea. The Idolmaster merchandise grossed ¥5.42 billion ($68 million) in Japan retail sales during 2007.

In terms of fan demographics, the fanbase of The Idolmaster franchise within Japan has an average age of 31 years, and a male-to-female ratio of approximately 50:50, based on a December 16, 2023, survey conducted by Nikkei Entertainment.

=== Critical reception ===
Famitsu review scores
Game	Famitsu (out of 40)
The Idolmaster	(X360) 26
The Idolmaster Live For You!	(X360) 28
The Idolmaster SP	(PSP) 31
The Idolmaster Dearly Stars	(NDS) 30
The Idolmaster 2	(X360) 31
The Idolmaster Shiny Festa	(PSP) 32
The Idolmaster One For All	(PS3) 33
The Idolmaster Must Songs	(PSV) 32
The Idolmaster Platinum Stars	(PS4) 34
The Idolmaster Stella Stage	(PS4) 33

The raising simulation system in the series has been described as simple and easy to understand, and the various minigames have been described as "addictive". However, the audition system in later games such as The Idolmaster 2 has been called strategically weaker, but at the same time easier to understand than previous games. As the series progressed, the improved realism in the idol's expressions, movements and manner of speaking was praised. As the first handheld release, The Idolmaster SP was praised as satisfying the needs of the fans who enjoy "lovingly raising their favorite idols" at all times. Overall, an enjoyable aspect of the series has been cited as deepening one's relationship with "cute and individualistic" idols while going through the ups and downs of the story.

The introduction of rivals into The Idolmaster SP was described as effectively giving each game a different impression, and competing against rivals in the series has been praised. While one reviewer for Famitsu suggested it was natural to identify with the idols when watching them perform, a different reviewer in the same magazine issue stated that the game would be somewhat tiresome if the player did not have an emotional attachment to a given idol. However, another reviewer noted that it was easier to empathize with an idol when the story is told from the perspective of the idols in The Idolmaster Dearly Stars. Although, because other aspects of the gameplay in Dearly Stars are similar such as doing lessons and auditions, the sense of enjoyment is not that different from other games. Early aspects of the series were criticized as presenting a narrow and unrealistic view of the idol world.

=== Appearances in other games ===
Ace Combat 6: Fires of Liberation, another Xbox 360 game developed and published by Namco, references The Idolmaster in special paint schemes for the Su-33 Flanker, F-117A Night Hawk, F-16C Fighting Falcon, F-2A Viper Zero, Su-47 Berkut, F-15E Strike Eagle, Rafale M, Mirage 2000-5, Typhoon, F-14D Tomcat and F-22A Raptor as part of downloadable packs of extra aircraft colors made available for purchase between November 22, 2007, and March 31, 2008. The character Miki Hoshii appears on the paint schemes of the Su-33 and Su-47, Yukiho Hagiwara appears on the F-117A, Chihaya Kisaragi appears on the F-15E, Haruka Amami on the F-22A, Yayoi Takatsuki on the Mirage 2000-5, Azusa Miura on the F-14D, and Iori Minase on the Rafale M.

Yayoi Takatsuki made a cameo in Namco's role-playing game (RPG) Tales of Hearts as a support attacker by using a move named High Touch. Haruka Amami made an appearance as a cameo costume for Mel in Namco's RPG Tales of Phantasia: Narikiri Dungeon X. The game Tales of the World: Radiant Mythology had several of the girls' costumes featured as purchasable and wearable armor. Downloadable content (DLC) costumes can be bought as custom outfits from The Idolmaster for the Namco Bandai games Tales of Graces and Tales of Xillia. In Graces, Sophie, Pascal and Cheria can have costumes purchased for them, and in Xillia, Milla, Leia and Elise can have costumes purchased for them.

A stage in Beautiful Katamari set in the producer's office features a song by ten of the girls titled "Danketsu". A remix was produced titled "Danketsu 2010" sung by all of the girls. Some of the Katamari Cousins in the game also represent the idols. Four songs from The Idolmaster series were featured in Taiko no Tatsujin 14. An update patch for PlayStation Home features The Idolmaster slot machines inside the Namco Bandai hubs where one can win special clothing to make PlayStation Home avatars look like Haruka. A collaboration DLC package between Sega's Hatsune Miku: Project DIVA 2nd and The Idolmaster SP was released, featuring a Haruka costume for Hatsune Miku, a combined version of Ami and Mami's costumes for Kagamine Rin, and a Chihaya costume for Megurine Luka. The package also comes with "Go My Way!!" redone by Miku and "Relations" redone by Luka and Rin. Ace Combat: Assault Horizon as well as the Ridge Racer series on PlayStation 3, PlayStation Vita and Xbox 360 also include DLC for The Idolmaster series.

Bandai Namco Entertainment and Aniplex has allowed third party companies and organizations to use the franchise's characters in their promotions both individually or as a group. Miki Hoshii was named the store manager of Tower Records' Japanese branches on March 21, 2011, at the retailer's Shinjuku branch. In 2012, the Tokyo Shrine Agency distributed posters and pamphlets featuring the 765 Production idols as part of a campaign to attract hatsumōde visitors. Sagan Tosu featured the idol characters of Cinderella Girls on the tickets and merchandises for their September 12, 2015, match against the Shimizu S-Pulse and September 26, 2015, match against the Ventforet Kofu.
