= The Idolmaster (video game) =

2005 simulation video game

- Cover art of the Xbox 360 version
- Developer: Metro
- Publishers: Namco (arcade); Namco Bandai Games (Xbox 360)
- Directors: Akihiro Ishihara (arcade); Hiroyuki Onoda (Xbox 360)
- Producers: Junichirō Koyama (arcade); Yōzō Sakagami (Xbox 360)
- Series: The Idolmaster
- Platforms: Arcade, Xbox 360
- Release: Arcade: JP: July 26, 2005; Xbox 360: JP: January 25, 2007; JP: November 1, 2007; (Platinum Collection)
- Genres: Raising simulation, Rhythm
- Modes: Single-player, multiplayer
- Arcade system: Namco System 246

The Idolmaster (Note: Japanese: アイドルマスター, Hepburn: Aidorumasutā; officially stylized as THE iDOLM@STER) is a Japanese raising simulation video game developed by Metro and published by Namco (later Namco Bandai Games). It was released on July 26, 2005 as an arcade game and is the first game in The Idolmaster series. It was ported to the Xbox 360 on January 25, 2007 with many changes and improvements. The gameplay and story follows the career of a producer in charge of training prospective pop idols on their way to stardom. This includes arranging the idol's schedule, taking them to jobs, training them during lessons, and directing them through auditions. As gameplay continues, a relationship will develop between the idol and her producer fostered through talking with the idol and forming good memories.

Development for the game began in 2001 to make an arcade game that would make players want to come back to play every day. To effectively use the competitive culture that surrounds video arcades, the game was developed so players would raise and compete against other players' idols on a national network. A port of the game had been discussed as early as two months before the arcade game was even released. The Xbox 360 was chosen because the development team felt its hardware and the Xbox Live network could handle the game's specifications. The original game features 10 songs the idols perform, which is increased to 16 in the Xbox 360 version, later released on several music albums. The raising simulation system has been described as simple and easy to understand, and the various minigames have been described as "addictive". However, the game has been criticized as presenting a narrow and unrealistic view of the idol world.

== Gameplay ==
The Idolmaster is a raising simulation game in which the player assumes the role of a producer working for the talent agency 765 Production (765 Pro) who is in charge of training 10 prospective pop idols on their way to stardom. They include: Haruka Amami, Chihaya Kisaragi, Yukiho Hagiwara, Yayoi Takatsuki, Ritsuko Akizuki, Azusa Miura, Iori Minase, Makoto Kikuchi, and Ami and Mami Futami (who work as a pair). The player starts by choosing an idol to train and the idol's unit name. The player is initially able to train a single idol, but this can increase to up to three idols at a time once the player gains enough experience as a producer. The game depicts the activities of the producer and idol during one day of each in-game week.

At the start of every in-game day, text progression pauses when the player is given the option to greet the idol or take a break, which ends that in-game week. There are multiple responses to choose from, and the player is given a limited amount of time to make a choice; if no choice is made before time runs out, the choice with the worst possible outcome is automatically chosen. Depending on which choice is made will affect an idol's enthusiasm, which is displayed at certain points throughout gameplay by the color of a heart on the heads-up display. An idol's enthusiasm ranges from black, to teal, yellow-green, violet and finally red as enthusiasm increases. The player can view the state of an idol's statistics at this time, which are divided into three categories: vocal, dance and visual image. As these increase, an idol's overall image level will also increase. The player is shown an idol report which shows an idol's rank and level, and contains current popularity trends in vocal, dance and visual image, which gives the player a guide on how to gain popularity. The player can next choose to either change the idol's song, her costume and accessories, or neither. Each idol unit can only perform at most three different songs, but these songs can be switched any number of times. The idol's daily schedule is divided into two choices: taking a lesson, which is followed by a communication phase, and taking an audition.

An example of Ami, Iori and Yukiho (respectively) taking a voice lesson. The player must tap the button that corresponds to the right note as the indicator passes from left to right over the notes.

The lessons are in the form of five minigames which serve to increase an idol's statistics in either vocal, dance or visual image. Each lesson is divided into six parts, and the lesson's overall performance is ranked from bad, to normal, good and finally perfect. Sometimes a lessons is temporarily unavailable. The communication phase of the gameplay mainly deals with the player talking with the idol and doing jobs to further her exposure to the public. The player is given multiple jobs to choose from, which change as an idol's rank increases. Like when greeting the idol before, the player is given multiple responses to choose from over the course of a conversation. Depending on which choice is made will affect how well or poorly the communication is received from bad, to normal, good and finally perfect communication, which results in either good or bad memories. The good memories are tallied in the heart on the heads-up display.

When the player chooses to do an audition, the idol will use the previously chosen song and costume if she passes the audition; the song is also used during the audition. Each costume and song have either a vocal, dance or visual attribute which will affect the idol's statistics and thus the results of the audition. There are three types of auditions: ones limited to idols with an E or F rank, national auditions for idols of any rank, and special auditions that can be taken after satisfying certain conditions. Once an audition is chosen, the player can view the rank and level of the other idols who are auditioning. While the game's network was still active up to 2010, the game would match up to five other players from around the country who were auditioning at the same time; if enough players could not be found, non-player characters would fill the necessary spots. When taking an audition, the player guides the idol to appeal to three judges in vocal, dance and visual image by receiving points in each category. How many points an idol receives when appealing is dependent on her statistics. Each audition is divided into three segments of nine attempts at an appeal followed by a mid-audition review. At the end of each segment, the three idols with the most points in a given image category will receive a number of stars in that category dependent on the current popularity trends from the idol report; an idol will also lose a star if she has the fewest points in a given category.

The interest level of the judges is indicated by three gauges which increase and decrease depending on how well or poorly an appeal is received. The appeals are also affected by how well the player stays in rhythm with the chosen song. If one judge is appealed to too many times, their interest level may drop to zero, at which point all the stars earned for that category will be revoked. The player also has the option to use up to three good memories during each audition which serve to dramatically increase an idol's appeal points and the gauges for the judges. At the end of the audition, the number of stars received determines if the idol passes or not. If an idol passes the audition, she is chosen to do a televised performance of the song previously chosen. In the case of a multiple idol unit, the player can choose who sings which lyrics, though at least one singer is needed for each line. A performance serves to increase an idol's number of fans, which in turn can increase an idol's rank if enough fans have been obtained for a given rank. An idol's rank starts at F, and goes up in stages to E, D, C, B, A and finally S. It is possible for an idol to make mistakes during a performance if she has not trained enough, which may affect the number of fans gained from the performance. The player is allowed to take photos during the performance, but only the last one taken can be saved.

Once the day's schedule has been completed, the player returns to 765 Pro with the idol in the evening. The player will be shown the idol's rank, how many fans she has gained over the course of the day, and how many fans she currently has. If available, the idol will be given various presents and letters from her fans at this time. The player's idol unit may be forced to retire under certain circumstances, such as the player not gaining enough fans by a specified time, which is called the rank up limit. In addition, if an idol's rank is either A or S, the idol will be forced to retire on week 62.

=== Xbox 360 ===
An example of Miki during an audition. The player must gain points in each image category to appeal to the judges, whose interest gauges are displayed on the left.

The Xbox 360 port of The Idolmaster features several changes to its gameplay. Miki Hoshii was added as another idol at 765 Pro the player can produce. An idol's enthusiasm is now displayed in a horizontal bar next to the heart containing the number of the idol's good memories. An idol's enthusiasm ranges from black, to blue, yellow and finally orange as enthusiasm increases. Each idol unit can now perform at most five different songs, but these songs can be switched any number of times as before. The scheduling system now offers four choices: doing promotional work, which is the same as the communication phase in the arcade version, taking a lesson, taking an audition, or taking the day off. If the player chooses to take the day off, a conversation event will sometimes occur, but does not include any choices for responses as during the normal communication phase. Otherwise, choosing to take the day off will cause the game to immediately proceed to the next in-game week and will cause an idol's enthusiasm to automatically increase.

The rank up limit has been removed, and the player is now given 52 weeks to produce an idol unit with the addition of specifying the month. This does not include an additional three weeks which take up the idol's pre-debut period. The port uses Xbox Live during auditions to match players online, but an Xbox Live Gold subscription is needed to participate. An Xbox Live Free subscription only allows a player to view player rankings. The auditions limited to idols with a rank of E or F are split into two categories, Rookie and Local, and the national auditions now require a minimum rank of D to participate. Up to five photos can now be saved during a performance. The game also includes 10 achievements.

== Development and release ==
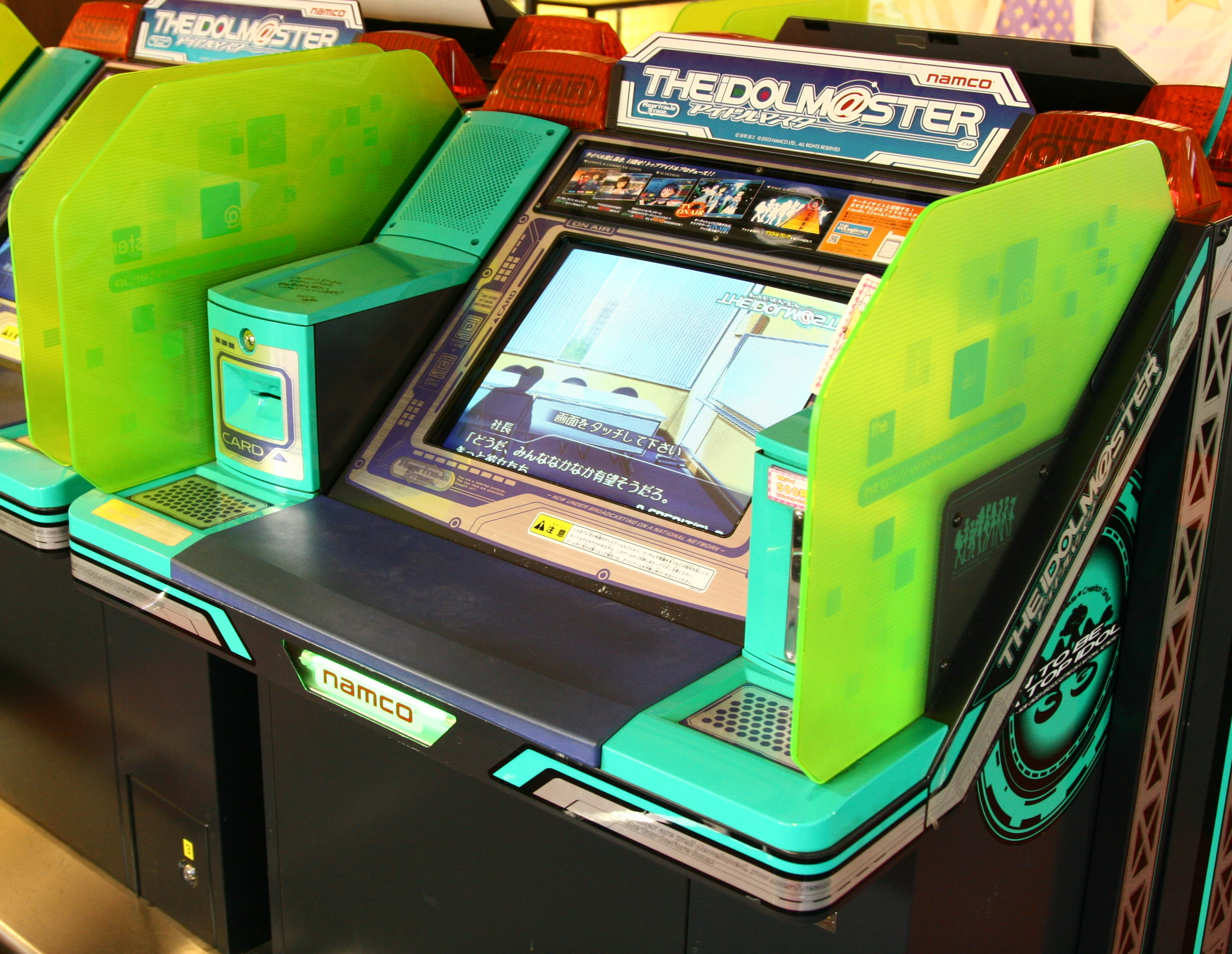
The Idolmaster arcade game cabinet

The Idolmaster was primarily developed by Metro, in conjunction with Namco. In the early 2000s, there were arcade games already in use that allowed players to save their progress on magnetic stripe cards so as to continue playing later. In 2001, Namco designer Akihiro Ishihara chose to create an arcade game that used that technology. Ishihara wanted to make a game that would make players want to come back to play every day, which would be tied to the growth of video arcades. Ishihara realized that players would need an emotional attachment to the game for them to play it every day. With the target audience to be male players, Ishihara thought that a raising simulation where players could befriend girls and young women would lead players to form a strong emotional attachment for the game.

Next, in order to effectively use the competitive culture that surrounds video arcades, Ishihara thought about various themes for the game, including professional wrestling and volleyball. Ishihara finally settled on a game featuring pop idols, who players would raise and compete against other players' idols to reach the top of the entertainment industry. The popularity of the talent search show Asayan partially influenced Ishihara in deciding on idols for the subject of the game, although he was still unsure if it was the right decision at the time. Video game producer Junichirō Koyama also points out that the concept of developing a simulation game featuring girls was influenced by the positive reception of bishōjo games such as Tokimeki Memorial and the horse raising simulation arcade game Derby Owners Club. There were some members of Namco that thought it would feel awkward to play The Idolmaster in public and that it would not be well received by players. However, when the game was first tested in arcades, there were long lines of people waiting to play. As word spread and its popularity grew, rival game companies said they had wanted to be the first to create a game like The Idolmaster.

The goal of the development team was to create a raising simulation game that would have gameplay distinctive of arcade games at the time, including making use of a large touchscreen and a national online network. Koyama suggested that it would be interesting to have a touchscreen so that players could touch the girls at certain times during gameplay and get interesting reactions. While developing the game, Koyama realized that most bishōjo games at the time focused on specializing characters for players' specific tastes, which he felt was detrimental to the community surrounding such games. Therefore, one of Koyama's goals in developing the game was to restore a community where players would discuss what parts of which characters they like or find cute. Ishihara focused on developing realistic characters because of his view that there were too many bishōjo games at the time that had characters who were developed to be convenient for the player. Ishihara wanted to place the burden of an idol's mistakes on the player for not training her enough to deepen a player's attachment with the idols.

The ultimate focus was to create a game with a "cool, club-like image" that would be close to the feel of a music game. Originally, the protagonist was going to be put in the role of the idol's manager, but it was later changed to the idol's producer because the latter was perceived to be "cooler". The basic concept of the game dealing with a producer training a prospective idol to reach the top of the entertainment industry was only solidified late in the development process. The development team had many problems with creating a game that had no close equivalent or preceding game that involved training idols, so trial-and-error served to lengthen the development process. The balance between the graphics, music and gameplay system had to be adjusted to lessen concerns about players being embarrassed to play the arcade game. The staff wanted to strike a balance with the character designs so they would not appear too moe. It was decided from the start the characters would be rendered using 3D graphics, so Toshiyuki Kubooka was chosen to do the character design because his art could be easier translated into 3D. The developers employed motion capture to present a realistic view of the characters—not only during normal gameplay, but also during performances, which were rendered using motion capture from professional dancers. It was originally planned that the game would include 12 or 13 idols, and at least two of these extra characters also had character designs. The idols of Morning Musume were used as an influence to create character types in The Idolmaster traditionally found in bishōjo games.

Following the success of the arcade game, Namco (now Namco Bandai Games following their merger with Bandai) went on to develop its Xbox 360 port starting in early 2006, though a port of the game had been discussed as early as May 2005. Namco Bandai Games producer Yōzō Sakagami was initially unsure if The Idolmaster would be suited for a video game console due to hardware and network limitations, but he felt that the Xbox 360 and its Xbox Live network could handle the game's specifications. This would also allow the developers to improve the game's quality and attract attention from those who never played the arcade game. Many people who were interested in the arcade game but never played it would tell Sakagami that this was either because their local arcade did not have The Idolmaster, or because they were embarrassed to play it in public. According to Sakagami, to the development team of the port, there was a large significance in correcting these issues. Their other focus was on allowing players to comfortably play the game and enjoy its various scenarios without the rushed gameplay found in the arcade version. When developing the Xbox 360 port of The Idolmaster, the characters had to be entirely redone, including the motion capture, which used the same actors as before. Further details were able to be added to the character designs because of the Xbox 360's improved, high-definition hardware.

The Idolmaster was first unveiled in February 2004 at the All Nippon Amusement Machine Operators' Union. It was released on July 26, 2005 as an arcade game using Namco's System 246 arcade system board. The game uses the touchscreen Rewritable Stage arcade cabinet, which issues the player two rewritable cards containing the player's profile and save data. It also makes use of Sega's ALL.Net network service to keep track of national idol rankings. The network was discontinued on September 1, 2010, though a few of the arcade cabinets still survive. The game was ported to the Xbox 360 on January 25, 2007, and it was released on Microsoft's Platinum Collection on November 1, 2007. The Idolmaster became available for download through the Xbox Live Marketplace on August 11, 2009. Namco Bandai Games released 12 downloadable content updates between January 24 and December 25, 2007 available through the Xbox Live Marketplace. The updates include new costumes, accessories, stages, and additional side-stories called "Idol Dramas".

=== Music ===
The Idolmaster features 10 songs in the arcade version and 6 additional songs in the Xbox 360 version written and composed by a variety of songwriters. Ishihara asked Hiroto Sasaki, one of the music composers, to compose normal pop songs that would not sound odd or similar to songs "from bishōjo games." The music staff was otherwise given the freedom to compose what songs they wanted. The composers were first introduced to the characters, and then personally chose which girls they wanted to compose songs for. In the arcade version, the nine songs for the idols were composed first as theme music for each girl, followed by Koyama asking for one more song with a "European" feel to be composed. Since each idol can sing any of the songs in the game, this resulted in 90 separate recordings over a period of two months.

The songs from the arcade version were released by Nippon Columbia on a five-part CD series of compilation albums titled The Idolmaster Masterpiece between 2005 and 2006. The songs from the Xbox 360 version were released by Nippon Columbia on a four-part CD series titled The Idolmaster Masterwork between 2006 and 2007. The first release was the single for "Watashi wa Idol♡" (私はアイドル♡) on December 20, 2006. This was followed by three compilation albums. Songs from The Idolmaster were also released on The Idolmaster Master Box volumes one and two between July 19, 2006 and April 4, 2007.

== Reception ==
The Xbox 360 port of The Idolmaster sold 25,000 copies in its first week of sale and was the fifteenth best selling console video game in Japan for the time of its release. The Xbox 360 version received a combined score of 26 out of 40 from the Japanese video game magazine Famitsu. The port has been credited with making Japan's ratio of sign-ups for Xbox Live compared to the number of consoles sold as the world's highest. Over four times as many Microsoft points were sold on the date of The Idolmaster's Xbox 360 release as on the date before it. The raising simulation system has been described as simple and easy to understand, and the various minigames have been described as "addictive". Despite there being a limited number of minigames for the lessons, they are described as having an "abundance of variation" that do not get tiring because of their unexpectedly high degree of difficulty. Similarly, choosing correct responses, such as during the promotional phase, is also described as fairly difficult because each of the given choices often appear to be similar despite having radically different outcomes.

While one reviewer for Famitsu suggested it was natural to identify with the idols when watching them perform, a different reviewer in the same magazine issue stated that the game would be somewhat tiresome if the player did not have an emotional attachment to a given idol. In writing for Dengeki Online, reviewer Aogeyarō's first impression of The Idolmaster was embarrassment about playing a bishōjo game in public, but after playing it, he felt that the emotional ups and downs of the game, including the passing and failing of auditions, was very enjoyable. In reviewing the Xbox 360 port, he likened the 52-week limit to the heartlessness that surrounds the entertainment industry. The game has also been criticized as presenting a narrow and unrealistic view of the idol world. Dom Nguyen writing for Wired described the arcade version as awkward at times and felt apprehension about the various touchscreen minigames that "encourage you to fondle the screen." He also called the "coin-guzzling nature" of the game "perturbing," and that it would result in a "ridiculous sum" if played long enough. Aogeyarō also commented on the high prices of an entire downloadable content pack for the Xbox 360 version, and cautioned that not everything in the pack may be needed or wanted.
