= Kanzaki =

Kanzaki (written: 神崎) may refer to:

== Places ==
- Kanzaki, Saga, a city in Saga Prefecture, Japan
- Kanzaki, Hyōgo, a former town in Kanzaki District, Hyōgo Prefecture, Japan
- Kanzaki District (disambiguation), multiple districts in Japan
- Kanzaki Station (disambiguation), multiple railway stations in Japan

== Other uses ==
- Kanzaki (surname), a Japanese surname
