= Kanzaki (surname) =

Kanzaki (written: 神崎) is a Japanese surname. Notable people with the surname include:

- Daisuke Kanzaki (神崎 大輔; born 1985), Japanese footballer
- Fumie Kanzaki (神崎文枝; born 1966), Japanese professional wrestler
- Kenji Kanzaki (神崎 健二; born 1963), Japanese shogi player
- Masaomi Kanzaki (神崎 将臣), Japanese manga artist
- Noriyuki Kanzaki (神崎 範之; born 1982), Japanese figure skater
- Ryosuke Kanzaki (神崎 亮佑; born 1982), Japanese footballer
- Shiori Kanzaki (神崎 詩織; born 1987), Japanese actress
- Takenori Kanzaki (神崎 武法; born 1943), Japanese politician

== Fictional characters ==
- Aoi Kanzaki (神崎 アオイ), a character in the manga series Demon Slayer: Kimetsu no Yaiba
- Aria H. Kanzaki (神崎・H(ホームズ)・アリア), a character in the light novel series Aria the Scarlet Ammo
- Elsa Kanzaki (神崎 エルザ), a character in the light novel series Sword Art Online Alternative Gun Gale Online
- Hayato Kanzaki, a character in the video game Star Gladiator
- Hideri Kanzaki (神崎 ひでり), a character in the manga series Blend S
- Hitomi Kanzaki (神崎ひとみ), a character in the anime series The Vision of Escaflowne
- Kaori Kanzaki (神裂 火織), a character in the light novel series A Certain Magical Index
- Mizuki Kanzaki (神崎 美月), a character in the media franchise Aikatsu!
- Nao kanzaki, the main character from the manga Liar Game by Shinobu Kaitani
- Ranko Kanzaki (神崎 蘭子), a character in the video game The Idolmaster Cinderella Girls
- Satoru Kanzaki, a character in the manga series Area 88
- Sumire Kanzaki (神崎 すみれ), a character in the media franchise Sakura Wars
- Shiro Kanzaki (神崎 士郎, Kanzaki Shirō), a character and the main antagonist in the Tokusatsu TV series Kamen Rider Ryuki.
- Urumi Kanzaki (神崎 麗美), a character from the manga and anime series Great Teacher Onizuka
