= Kanzaki District =

Kanzaki District may refer to:

- Kanzaki District, Hyōgo
- Kanzaki District, Saga
- Kanzaki District, Shiga

== See also ==
- Kanzaki (disambiguation)
