= List of The Idolmaster characters =

This is the list of characters from The Idolmaster game franchise.

== 765 Production ==
Logo of 765 Production

=== 765 idols ===
The primary characters in The Idolmaster are affiliated with 765 Production, described as a small, independent talent agency based in a small office. In Million Live!, it is depicted as a much larger talent agency, even having its own theater.

Haruka Amami (天海 春香, Amami Haruka)
Voiced by: Eriko Nakamura
Million Live! archetype: Princess
Haruka is an all-around ordinary girl and is considered the face of The Idolmaster. She has enjoyed singing and baking sweets ever since she was a child, despite the fact that she seems to be quite inept as a cook in general. She is easily excited and somewhat clumsy, admitting that she habitually trips at least once a day. That said, she always tries to stay positive and keeps a strong resolve, always working the hardest to make the Producer happy. Even though her character image color is red, Haruka actually tends to be a bit partial towards the color magenta, if not pink, which is Iori’s image color. Haruka is best distinguished by the ribbon bows on her hair. Apart from her dream of becoming a famous idol, she’s very grounded in her roots and is comfortable just having work in general, as well as spending time with her fellow idols. Haruka is close to the other idols, but she is the closest to Chihaya Kisaragi, whom she helps overcome her past.

Chihaya Kisaragi (如月 千早, Kisaragi Chihaya)
Voiced by: Asami Imai
Million Live! archetype: Fairy
Cool and serious, Chihaya has the greatest enthusiasm towards music and the greatest natural talent of all of the girls, earnestly believing that if she were no longer able to sing, she would rather die. She does not very much care for the title "idol" though, preferring to refer to herself as a "vocalist" instead. Chihaya enjoys listening to classical music, and often spends her time all by herself, giving a nature of maturity around her, though she is really awkward when it comes to communicating with others. Despite her age, she has the smallest bust among the 765 Pro idols and is very conscious of it whenever she sees other girls with bigger busts, especially Takane and Azusa. Chihaya has a tragic past, namely that she lost her younger brother to a car accident eight years ago, causing her to blame herself for whatever happened that time. This also led to her parents’ divorce, driving a wedge between her and her parents. She overcomes her past thanks to her friends, and after that whenever she comes to her friends, she is quite cheery, but still isn’t very expressive. Chihaya is the best friend of Haruka Amami.

Yukiho Hagiwara (萩原 雪歩, Hagiwara Yukiho)
Voiced by: Yurina Hase (2005–2010), Azumi Asakura (2010–present)
Million Live! archetype: Princess
A terrible crier, Yukiho aspires to become an idol in order to help shed her cowardly disposition. She is afraid of dogs – even chihuahuas seem threatening to her – and does not do well with men either. Having grown up in a strict, traditional Japanese household, Yukiho’s drink of choice is tea, preferably green tea. Among her hobbies is poetry, especially writing haikus, but she is too shy to share her poems with anyone even once. Though her image color is white, she tends to be partial to the color "Baby Blue". Whenever she is depressed or scared, she has a habit of running off, exclaiming she will go "dig a hole and bury myself in it." Sometimes, she takes it literally, grabbing a shovel and digging a hole until someone tells her to stop. Yukiho is Makoto Kikuchi’s best friend since childhood.
In 2010, Yukiho’s original voice actress, then known as Yurika Ochiai, resigned from her role, citing death threats against her that also forced her to change her name. As a result, she was replaced by Azumi Asakura from The Idolmaster 2 onward.

Yayoi Takatsuki (高槻 やよい, Takatsuki Yayoi)
Voiced by: Mayako Nigo
Million Live! archetype: Angel
Yayoi is a bright and cheerful girl who cares for her family very much. Due to her father’s occupational status uncertainty, her family is quite poor, as indicated by Yayoi’s plain clothing, which she has actually had for a very long time. To earn extra money, Yayoi often does cleaning and other odd jobs around the 765 Production office building, and continues to do so even after she debuts as an idol. Fittingly, she is highly energetic, never wanting to let the weight of the world crush her spirit. Yayoi is the oldest of six siblings and is often the one who looks after her siblings, but also wishes she had an "older brother" type around to look after her. Yayoi is very close to Iori Minase, despite having vastly different backgrounds.

Ritsuko Akizuki (秋月 律子, Akizuki Ritsuko)
Voiced by: Naomi Wakabayashi
Million Live! archetype: Fairy
The cool, smart-girl type, Ritsuko believes in theory more than her own inner strength. Originally an intern working at 765 Production after graduating from high school, due to a lack of girls scouted by 765 Production, Ritsuko decided to become an idol herself. Ritsuko’s family consists of herself, her mother, and her father. Her parents share the same traits as Ritsuko – being business-like and hardworking. They also own a small shop in town. Despite being an idol, she still has one hand in the business side of her own celebrities’ life, and is quick to chide the Producer if she thinks he is not doing his job correctly.
In The Idolmaster 2, Ritsuko becomes the producer for the idol unit Ryūgū Komachi and ties her hair up. She’ll tie her hair in braids again when using a Ryūgū Komachi costume in the game. In the anime, she is a semi-active idol who became a producer for 765 Production, and ties her hair in braids for the concert in episode 18.
As of Platinum Stars, Ritsuko is now a semi-active idol in 765 Production.

Azusa Miura (三浦 あずさ, Miura Azusa)
Voiced by: Chiaki Takahashi
Million Live! archetype: Angel
The oldest amongst all idols in the game, Azusa’s personality is best described as one of kind-hearted, airheaded "big sister" type. She is very easygoing, but has an incredibly terrible sense of direction, which becomes subject of a running gag – whenever she is walking all by herself, she will end up in a strange, distant place, with no idea of how she got there or how to get back. Her airheaded personality is shown when she thought of Hibiki’s hamster as 'a valuable thing', making her attempt to put him inside an inn room safe. Azusa also enjoys giving and reading fortunes, and has a firm belief that she will one day fall in love with "someone destined for her". One of her motivations for becoming an idol is, in fact, to someday find her true love.
In The Idolmaster 2, Azusa cuts her hair short (which was originally long) and makes an idol unit with Iori and Ami called Ryūgū Komachi. In the anime, Azusa still has long hair at the beginning, but later cuts her hair short after she joins Ryūgū Komachi.

Iori Minase (水瀬 伊織, Minase Iori)
Voiced by: Rie Kugimiya
Million Live! archetype: Fairy
The daughter of one of the associates of the 765 Production president, Iori is a spoiled rich girl who flaunts her family’s wealth. Although she speaks in quite a polite, refined manner on stage and in public, she has a very sharp tongue and is quick to berate other people’s intelligence or attitude, especially the Producer. Probably because she was raised with two older brothers, Iori has grown up with a strong competitive streak, and thus rarely shows any weaknesses. However, she does have a much softer side that she shows from time to time, making her personality that of an archetypal tsundere character. She is sometimes seen carrying around a stuffed rabbit with her, which she named "Usa-chan" (also known as "Charles Donatello the 18th" in the anime). Despite being such a spoiled brat from a wealthy family, her best friend is Yayoi Takatsuki, who happens to be much poorer than her.
In The Idolmaster 2, Iori makes an idol unit with Ami and Azusa called Ryūgū Komachi. She also changes her hairstyle, leaving a bang of hair out of her hairband.

Makoto Kikuchi (菊地 真, Kikuchi Makoto)
Voiced by: Hiromi Hirata
Million Live! archetype: Princess
The tomboy of the group, Makoto is popularized as the "pretty-boy idol" within 765 Production. As a result, she has accumulated more female fans than male ones, becoming the cause of her psychological complex and a running gag at her expense. She is usually seen in sporty outfits and was already very popular among her fellow students at the all-girls school she attends, and her current work as an idol does not make the situation any easier for her. Her father is a famous race-car driver and had wished for a son instead, so he raised Makoto as a boy. Even though she is not ungrateful of her popularity, underneath her gruff, boyish exterior, Makoto is actually an honest, sensitive girl who wishes to make herself more feminine. Therefore, unbeknownst to her father, she decided to become an idol in order to find a way to a new, more feminine presence for herself and to show others that she can have a girly side as well. She is also shown to be friends with Yukiho Hagiwara, who is much different from her as far as personality is concerned.
As of The Idolmaster 2, Makoto grows her hair longer and parts her bangs in the middle, and she is also revealed to be a skilled mixed martial artist.

Ami Futami (双海 亜美, Futami Ami)
Voiced by: Asami Shimoda
Million Live! archetype: Angel
Ami and Mami are a pair of playful identical twin sisters who make a two-girl singing sensation. Ami and Mami both enjoy doing impressions and teasing their co-workers, though Ami is said to be more fun-loving than Mami. The only way to tell the two girls apart is through their hairstyles – Ami ties her hair to the left, Mami to the right – otherwise, they are identical. They use this to their advantage by switching their hairstyles and both performing as idols, but only underneath Ami’s name. In The Idolmaster arcade game, the only people who actually know that Ami and Mami are twins are fellow members of 765 Production.
By the time of The Idolmaster 2, the public has come to acknowledge the existence of the twins. As a result, Ami makes an idol unit with Iori and Azusa called Ryūgū Komachi. In the anime, the twins are already produced as separate idols.

Mami Futami (双海 真美, Futami Mami)
Voiced by: Asami Shimoda
Million Live! archetype: Angel
The other half of the Futami twins, Mami is available to produce as a solo idol from The Idolmaster 2 onwards. As the twin sister of Ami, Mami has many similarities to Ami in terms of personality, but is described as more mature and a little more obedient in comparison.
While the original arcade game implies that Ami is the older of the twins, the Xbox 360 game hints towards Mami being the older twin, which seems to have been the case since then. Also in The Idolmaster 2, Mami extends her ponytail longer to further differentiate herself from her sister, and she often worries that she doesn’t get as much work as Ami due to the time they spent as an idol under the same name.

==== Project Fairy ====
Project Fairy is an idol unit introduced in The Idolmaster SP, produced by the rival 961 Production. The unit was specifically created with its three members having different specialties so that they harmonize perfectly with each other. As of The Idolmaster Dearly Stars, the members of Project Fairy have become part of 765 Production.

Miki Hoshii (星井 美希, Hoshii Miki)
Voiced by: Akiko Hasegawa
Million Live! archetype: Angel
Introduced in the Xbox 360 game, Miki is a natural, talented girl who feels that she has rarely had to work hard for anything. Because of this, she is pretty lazy and always approaches tasks with a very laid-back personality. She manages good grades with minimal effort and boasts natural good-looks that belie her age, but she can sometimes become an annoyance to others because of the quirky nature she sometimes exhibits. She even receives about 20 confessions of love from boys everyday. Raised in a very laissez-faire family, Miki’s parents don’t see any problem with her becoming an idol. While she doesn’t really have cruel intentions, she believes like everything else, she can make her way to become a top idol easily. Miki also loves onigiri, and can be seen sleeping all day when not doing anything else. Her catchphrase is "Afuu", which she utters every time she finishes yawning.
In the Xbox 360 game, Miki is in some way the main character besides Haruka, and her character has developed considerably over the game’s year-long time span. If special conditions are met in the game, she cuts her hair short and no longer dyes it blonde.
In The Idolmaster SP, Miki was unsatisfied with the way she was being managed, and switched to rival production company, 961 Production, as a member of the unit "Project Fairy".
As of The Idolmaster Dearly Stars, Miki has rejoined 765 Pro. She also received several changes in The Idolmaster 2, with her normal and "awakened" personalities having apparently been merged into one, and her hair now naturally blond and slightly wavier.

Takane Shijō (四条 貴音, Shijō Takane)
Voiced by: Yumi Hara
Million Live! archetype: Fairy
Introduced in The Idolmaster SP as a member of "Project Fairy", Takane is an elegant young lady from an affluent background, as seen in her outfits. While she has an elegant, spoiled brat personality due to her wealthy upbringing, she also has a refined, regal personality, and a princess-like nature to her. She hardly ever sees her mother, and her father often goes out on business trips – he is said to own a large company, much like Iori’s father, which is also why Takane has problems with her father – so she lives with her butler. Takane has an amazing passion for music, and is considered one of the smartest characters in the series, being fluent in numerous languages, including German. She also often observes far more detailed things than almost everybody else. A person of indeterminate origins, it is implied in the anime that she was not born in Japan. She is indeed mysterious in almost every way imaginable as she keeps most of her personal information hidden, especially where she came from. Despite being from a very wealthy family, Takane secretly takes an interest in commoner lifestyle and really enjoys ramen.
As of The Idolmaster Dearly Stars, Takane has signed up to 765 Pro.

Hibiki Ganaha (我那覇 響, Ganaha Hibiki)
Voiced by: Manami Numakura
Million Live! archetype: Princess
Introduced in The Idolmaster SP as a member of "Project Fairy", Hibiki is an extremely energetic and cheerful girl hailing from Okinawa. Despite the rivalries with the other idols, she is very friendly, without becoming overly competitive like Takane. Hibiki has an outstanding number of pets, which she happens to lose quite frequently – her pets include a mouse, a hamster (named Hamuzō in the anime), a gerbil, a parrot, a rabbit, a cat, a dog (a female St. Bernard named Inumi in the anime), a pig, a flying squirrel and, oddly enough, a crocodile. She also has a pet chicken (named Kokemaro), who is apparently kept at her parents’ home in Okinawa.
As of The Idolmaster Dearly Stars, Hibiki has become part of 765 Pro. Her three sizes also shrank, since she is the only character that happens to, leading some fans to theorize that President Kuroi had lied about her measurements.

=== 765 staff ===
Producer (プロデューサー, Purodyūsā)
Voiced by: Yūki Tai (drama CDs), Kenji Akabane (anime)
The protagonist of The Idolmaster. He is a young rookie producer who has been put in charge of a new set of pop idols. In the game, his name is never given, and is therefore decided by the player. His personality also depends on the player’s choices, ranging from sweet and protective to lewd and perverted. However, in the drama CDs, he’s most usually portrayed as somewhere in between.
In the anime, the producer remains unnamed, but is given the physical appearance of a young man with dark blue hair, glasses and a business suit. As the girls' producer, he is a very hard-working person who tries his best to help the idols as their mentor figure, going to whatever lengths to make sure the girls are happy, healthy, and able to make their appearances. Like Yukiho, he too is afraid of dogs. While he mainly produces the rest of the girls, he sometimes co-produces Ryūgū Komachi with Ritsuko, often taking over when she is unavailable or it only involves a single member, even temporarily producing Ritsuko when she goes back on stage for a concert. He is most often Yukiho’s manager throughout the time.
The same Producer from the original anime also appears in the Million Live! anime adaptation, referred to as the Chief Producer (チーフプロデューサー, Chīfu Purodyūsā).

Producer (プロデューサー, Purodyūsā)
Voiced by: Genta Nakamura
The protagonist of the Million Live! anime adaptation. He is a rookie producer for 765 Production, assigned to manage 39 new 765 Production idols.

Jun'ichirō Takagi (高木 順一朗, Takagi Jun'ichirō)
Voiced by: Kan Tokumaru
The president of 765 Production, he takes the Producer under his wing and monitors his performance in charge of the girls. He is never seen as anything but a silhouette, and is rarely encountered outside of the 765 Pro office building, except at the final performance in The Idolmaster game. In The Idolmaster Break! manga, his appearance is revealed to be a middle-aged man around his fifties or sixties.
Before The Idolmaster 2 entered development, Jun'ichirō's voice actor, Kan Tokumaru, died. As a result, in The Idolmaster 2, Jun'ichirō is given a backstory of why he did not return in the game – he has handed over the position of president of 765 Production to his cousin, Junjirō Takagi, so he can stop having to travel around Japan as he plans to move to Hawaii. Since then, Jun'ichirō is the chairman of 765 Production.

Junjirō Takagi (高木 順二朗, Takagi Junjirō)
Voiced by: Hōchū Ōtsuka
Jun'ichirō’s cousin and the president of 765 Production as of The Idolmaster 2. Much like his cousin, he appears only as a silhouette in the game. However, he does physically appear in the anime, although his face is still not fully shown. Owing to his background as a former producer, Junjirō has learned to know the idols that have been under his tutelage. As a result, he puts a lot of faith and trust in his idols, believing that they will eventually make it through. Because of this, he desires to promote them simply as they are and have them rely on their own talents and will to pull them through. Furthermore, he uses his resources well to keep his idols happy as he believes that they are at their best when they are happy.

Kotori Otonashi (音無 小鳥, Otonashi Kotori)
Voiced by: Juri Takita
An office clerk at 765 Production. Kotori originally only appears at the end of The Idolmaster arcade game, but then becomes a recurring character within the drama CDs. Originally featured on The Idolmaster arcade game webpage in the F.A.Q. section, she has accumulated enough fans to appear later on The Idolmaster media franchise. Among the few things disclosed about her personality and character, Kotori is known to be a little older than Azusa (making her somewhere in her early twenties), and despite not being an idol herself, she does love to sing. Her surname literally means "soundless", which refers to the fact that she was originally unvoiced. Kotori has a mole beauty mark on the right side of her chin that is often covered up by her microphone piece.
In The Idolmaster 2, Kotori remains a clerk at 765 Production. Kotori’s mole also appears as a DLC accessory.
In The Idolmaster anime, Kotori takes a more active role with the girls, especially when the Producer and Ritsuko are busy. A young girl, implied to be a younger Kotori (albeit with longer hair and a mole under her right eye; later confirmed to be Kotori’s mother, Kotomi), was revealed to have been produced by Junjirō and Kuroi before they went their separate ways.
Kotori is the protagonist of the manga Asayake wa Koganeiro, which depicts her in her high school days, during which she aims to become an idol.

Sora Hayasaka (早坂 そら, Hayasaka Sora)
Voiced by: Riho Sugiyama
A 765 Pro camerawoman for the Million Theater. While originally a minor character in the original Million Live! mobile game, she has a somewhat more prominent role in the anime adaptation of Million Live!.

Misaki Aoba (青羽 美咲, Aoba Misaki)
Voiced by: Chika Anzai
A 765 Pro secretary introduced in Theater Days, usually taking the place of Kotori Otonashi in the game. Her birthday is the same as the release date of Theater Days.

==== Spin-off staff ====
These 765 Pro staff members only appear in spin-off media.

Yūtarō Takagi (高木 裕太郎, Takagi Yūtarō)
Voiced by: Azumi Asakura
Jun'ichirō’s grandson, Yūtarō is the protagonist of The Idolmaster Break! manga. He is a fan of the idols of 765 Production, especially Haruka. But when his grandfather gets ill, Yūtarō is forced to temporarily take over the company as both its new president and its producer as he deals with the company’s finances and manages the idols’ careers.

Hiroyuki Yoshino (芳野 裕行, Yoshino Hiroyuki)
Chihaya’s producer who appears in the first volume of the novel. A returnee from the United States, where he had an unsuccessful music career, he took the job after returning to Japan.

Ayano Miki (実喜 綾乃, Miki Ayano)
Ritsuko, Haruka and Yukiho’s producer in the second volume of the novel. She is a former acquaintance of President Takagi.

Kaoru Kakitsubasa (杜若 薫, Kakitsubasa Kaoru)
Voiced by: Megumi Toyoguchi
A bijin who assists the Producer in "DRAMA CD NEW STAGE 01".

=== Puchimas! ===
Puchimas! Petit Idolmaster is a spin-off manga and anime series where the 765 Pro characters are accompanied by chibi versions of themselves ("Puchidols"), each of whom shares the same voice actress.

Haruka-san (はるかさん, Haruka-san)
Haruka’s Puchidol. Similar to Gremlins, she dislikes sunlight, turns malicious when her hair ribbons are misplaced, multiplies herself whenever she comes into contact with water, creating a huge number of clones to the others’ chagrin, and becomes demonic when fed after midnight. She also likes to nibble at others.
Chihya (ちひゃー, Chihyā)
Chihaya’s Puchidol who loves to sing, but dislikes girls with large breasts, reflecting Chihaya’s self-consciousness with her own bust size, with Ritsuko being the only exception. She also develops a longer hair during winter that grows back soon after it is cut.
Yukipo (ゆきぽ, Yukipo)
Yukiho’s Puchidol who loves tea and usually rests in a cardboard box or in a hole she drilled for herself, which is often her preferred hiding place in any situation. During winter, she grows a tanuki tail.
Yayo (やよ, Yayo)
Yayoi’s Puchidol who reacts sharply to the sound of money falling and other kind of sounds. When it gets cold, she grows tufty, lame-looking long hair.
Chicchan (ちっちゃん, Chicchan)
Ritsuko’s Puchidol who’s very good at office work and loves to be petted and complimented by the producer. Also similar to Ritsuko, she takes care of the other puchis.
Miura-san (みうらさん, Miura-san)
Azusa’s Puchidol who has teleporting powers, warping to a random location when startled by a loud noise, and usually helps the other idols and puchis when they need fast transportation.
Io (いお, Io)
Iori’s Puchidol who can charge energy on her forehead to unleash a beam of destruction, which is often used against roaches.
Makochi (まこちー, Makochī)
Makoto’s Puchidol who is very cute and strong, capable of performing strong pro wrestling moves, as well as having healing powers. She is often seen as fat due to Makoto, who’s so enamored by her cuteness that she can’t stop overfeeding her.
Koami (こあみ, Koami) and Komami (こまみ, Komami)
Ami and Mami’s Puchidols who love to play pranks and usually get themselves in trouble. Unlike the others, who stay with their counterparts, Koami and Komami stay with Takane while Takane’s Puchidol, Takanya, stays with Ami and Mami.
Afuu (あふぅ, Afuu)
Miki’s Puchidol who, much like her counterpart, loves onigiri. When she is exposed to heat, her hair color and personality changes dramatically.
Takanya (たかにゃ, Takanya)
Takane’s Puchidol. Found in a Brazil-like tropical country, she loves ramen, has an unusual personality and talks by writing out words on paper. Unlike the others, who stay with their counterparts, Takane does not take a liking to Takanya, but obsesses over the others, especially Koami and Komami, of whom she does take care.
Chibiki (ちびき, Chibiki)
Hibiki’s Puchidol who is very energetic and can summon strange animals to do her bidding, a power that tends to go haywire whenever she cries, bringing forth dangerous monsters.
Piyo Piyo (ぴよぴよ, Piyo Piyo)
Kotori’s Puchidol who is more reliable in office work than her, and is also very agile and capable of flying.
Producer (Puchimas version)
Voiced by: Junji Majima
A human with a huge letter "P" in place of his head.

=== Million Live! ===
The Idolmaster Million Live! introduces thirty-nine idols who, alongside the thirteen original 765 idols, are all categorized into two different archetype categories: one involving specialty (Vocal, Dance, Visual; used in the Million Live! mobile game) and another involving personality (Princess, Fairy, and Angel; used in Theater Days).

==== Princess idols ====
Mirai Kasuga (春日 未来, Kasuga Mirai)
Voiced by: Haruka Yamazaki
Specialty type: Vocal
Mirai is a high-spirited girl who decided to become an idol when a friend of hers took her to a concert. She is not the smartest girl around though, as she often forgets to do her homework and knows nothing about historical figures.

Kotoha Tanaka (田中 琴葉, Tanaka Kotoha)
Voiced by: Risa Taneda
Specialty type: Vocal
Kotoha is a workaholic young woman with a passion for acting. Despite being described as diligent and determined to do her best, she has one fatal weakness – she has a fragile mentality. This causes her to have very low confidence and easily get stressed by her routine. She is best friends with Megumi Tokoro and Elena Shimabara.
Kotoha was originally absent at the launch of Theater Days because her voice actress, Risa Taneda, took a hiatus from voice acting due to illness. She was eventually added to the game in February 2018.

Minako Satake (佐竹 美奈子, Satake Minako)
Voiced by: Eri Ōzeki
Specialty type: Dance
Minako is the daughter of a Chinese restaurant owner, where she also worked as a waitress and, on some occasions, a chef. Unsurprisingly, she is very good at cooking. She can cook dishes in large quantities, firmly believing the more food one takes, the happier one becomes. Minako’s hobbies include fighting video games.

Matsuri Tokugawa (徳川 まつり, Tokugawa Matsuri)
Voiced by: Ayaka Suwa
Specialty type: Visual
Matsuri is a young woman with a colorful personality who habitually fancies herself as some sort of princess. While she can be oblivious to her surroundings whenever she is acting like a princess, Matsuri is actually a mature and wise young woman, aware that her princess persona is just an act after all. She cares a lot for her fellow idols, especially the younger ones. It is also said that she is very good at everything she does, despite claiming she has no idea about that.

Yuriko Nanao (七尾 百合子, Nanao Yuriko)
Voiced by: Miku Itō
Specialty type: Visual
Yuriko is a young girl who loves to read books, especially fantasy and mystery novels, causing her to develop a habit of fantasizing about the story from the books happening around her. In reality, she is incredibly shy and tends to stay away from strangers. Her only friend before she became an idol was Anna Mochizuki, with whom she plays in an MMOPRG, where Yuriko goes by the name of 'LilyKnight'.

Sayoko Takayama (高山 紗代子, Takayama Sayoko)
Voiced by: Yuri Komagata
Specialty type: Vocal
An honor student at her class and a talented vocalist, Sayoko is a serious and hot-blooded girl who’s so determined to do anything she has to do that she never backs down until the last moment. She became an idol because she had promised with someone referred to only as "that child" during a summer festival. Whenever she is performing as an idol, Sayoko would always ditch her glasses beforehand, but this causes her to be unable to see clearly.

Arisa Matsuda (松田 亜利沙, Matsuda Arisa)
Voiced by: Rie Murakawa
Specialty type: Vocal
An enthusiastic idol otaku to the point of obsession, Arisa is such a big fan of idols that she has collected every idol merchandise she can find. She also owns an exhaustive database storing information about idols, specifically those from 765 Pro, in her computer. Wishing to get closer to the idols she admires, Arisa decided to take an audition and become an idol herself. It is revealed that her obsession with idols is passed down from her father, who also happens to be an idol otaku.

Umi Kōsaka (高坂 海美, Kōsaka Umi)
Voiced by: Reina Ueda
Specialty type: Dance
Umi is an athletic and energetic girl who can’t stand staying inactive for a long time. Said to be capable of doing almost every kind of sport, Umi believes that she is blessed with having good legs. When she was younger, she took ballet lessons, which is why her body is so flexible. While highly athletic and enjoying sports, she doesn’t mind having to wear girly idol costumes.

Iku Nakatani (中谷 育, Nakatani Iku)
Voiced by: Akari Harashima
Specialty type: Visual
The youngest of the cast of Million Live!, Iku is quite a precocious little girl for her age of 10. She believes she can do anything on her own and hates being treated like a child, though she is still a child anyway. Iku is best friends with Momoko Suō.

Emily Stewart (エミリー・スチュアート, Emirī Suchuāto)
Voiced by: Yū Kahara
Specialty type: Dance
An energetic and cheerful European girl – she is from England – Emily came to Japan because she is passionate about its culture, claiming one day she will become a yamato nadeshiko. She speaks Japanese in a very peculiar way, using archaic phrases and complicated Japanese terms that were more common in the older eras. It is revealed that Emily learned Japanese from her dance teacher.

Kana Yabuki (矢吹 可奈, Yabuki Kana)
Voiced by: Ibuki Kido
Specialty type: Vocal
Kana is a cheerful girl who loves to sing and aspires to be an idol. However, she is tone-deaf, and is thus a terrible singer. Because of this, she has been working as hard as she can to improve her singing. Her singing aside, Kana is shown to be really good at playing the clarinet. She is very close to Shiho Kitazawa. As shown in the movie, Kana would often eat sweets whenever she becomes anxious.

Nao Yokoyama (横山 奈緒, Yokoyama Nao)
Voiced by: Yui Watanabe
Specialty type: Dance
A cheerful girl from Osaka, Nao can be described as some kind of a stereotypical Osakan, as evident with her distinct Kansai dialect and her love for sweets. She is also forgetful, often forgetting what she just said a few minutes before. While she is known to have a great belief in herself, Nao can become stubborn, preferring to take action first without a forethought.

Noriko Fukuda (福田 のり子, Fukuda Noriko)
Voiced by: Nana Hamasaki
Specialty type: Dance
A big fan of mixed martial arts and pro wrestling, Noriko is an active and outgoing girl. Despite being such a tomboy, she wishes to be girlier and aims to create a cute image around her as an idol. She’s not used to girly things though, so she decided to keep her tomboyish image anyway.

==== Fairy idols ====
Shizuka Mogami (最上 静香, Mogami Shizuka)
Voiced by: Azusa Tadokoro
Specialty type: Vocal
Shizuka is a stoic girl who’s incredibly harsh towards the Producer due to her distrust of adults, which probably resulted from her troubled relationship with her father. She takes her idol career seriously, and insists she doesn’t need help from adults at all. Even then, she is still childish and really cares for anyone she trusts or is friends with.

Megumi Tokoro (所 恵美, Tokoro Megumi)
Voiced by: Yukiyo Fujii
Specialty type: Visual
Megumi is a stylish girl who’s really good a making friends. While she looks like a typical schoolgirl, she has a superior sense of style and is incredibly outgoing, often asking her friends out for a meal at a restaurant. When it comes to her job as an idol, she is just as passionate. Megumi is often seen with Kotoha Tanaka and Elena Shimabara.

Roco (ロコ) / Roco Handa (伴田 路子, Handa Roco)
Voiced by: Atsuki Nakamura
Specialty type: Visual
An aspiring artist, Roco can be described as a mad genius with wild artistic antics and incomprehensible quirks. She has quite a habit of slipping English words in her speech, though she is not that good at speaking English. She even believes she was born to be an idol, the exact reason why she became one herself. Despite having such confidence in her artistic skills, Roco is in fact somewhat of a loner and turns gleeful whenever someone comes to appreciate her works of art, which is quite a rare occurrence in itself.

Tomoka Tenkūbashi (天空橋 朋花, Tenkūbashi Tomoka)
Voiced by: Kotori Koiwai
Specialty type: Vocal
Tomoka is a kind and polite girl who believes she is some kind of "Holy Mother". Despite looking like a refined young lady, and believing she loves all people, she also demands that people love her back. She even has quite a habit of calling her fans "piglets" and couldn’t care less that she is being rude in her speech. It is known that Tomoka has a fanclub dedicated to her called the "Sky Knights".

Shiho Kitazawa (北沢 志保, Kitazawa Shiho)
Voiced by: Sora Amamiya
Specialty type: Visual
Shiho is a cool, lone-wolf girl who takes anything she does seriously. Her cold and stoic demeanor comes from the lack of a fatherly presence since early childhood, causing her to be the one who helps out her mother and looks after her younger brother. Struggling to make all ends meet, she decided to become an idol. Despite being so cynical and harsh, Shiho does have a softer side and wishes she had a father figure in her life. Shiho is best friends with Kana Yabuki.

Ayumu Maihama (舞浜 歩, Maihama Ayumu)
Voiced by: Megumi Toda
Specialty type: Dance
A recent returnee from the United States, Ayumu is a young woman who’s really good at dancing, and nothing else. In fact, she has a fear of heights, cannot control herself when doing a sexy pose, and cannot swim at all – whenever she is close to a pool of water, chances are she will drop into the pool and scream for help. Owing to her background, Ayumu has a habit of exclaiming "Oh my God!" when she’s surprised, but she otherwise cannot speak English and doesn’t want to talk about her time in America.

Chizuru Nikaidō (二階堂 千鶴, Nikaidō Chizuru)
Voiced by: Kanako Nomura
Specialty type: Visual
A self-proclaimed celebrity, Chizuru has a habit of acting like a celebrity, though in reality, she’s not very good at it. For example, she habitually ends up coughing whenever she tries to laugh. Only the more innocent girls like Yayoi and Hinata actually believe she is a celebrity herself. Despite this, Chizuru is actually generous and kind to her fellow idols, especially the younger ones.

Mizuki Makabe (真壁 瑞希, Makabe Mizuki)
Voiced by: Rika Abe
Specialty type: Dance
Mizuki is a stern girl who rarely shows emotions. Despite this, she is a good person at heart and wishes to be able to express her own emotions. She also has a weird sense of humor, which in turn becomes a running gag where she appears deadpan. Mizuki likes to perform magic tricks, especially ones involving anything like playing cards and batons, and enjoys crossword puzzles.

Rio Momose (百瀬 莉緒, Momose Rio)
Voiced by: Rikako Yamaguchi
Specialty type: Dance
A flirtatious young woman, Rio is aware of her sexy body, but never has luck with men as all her attempts to woo them don’t end well for her. She admits that she was never popular with boys to begin with and doesn’t know why, though it is probably because she has no idea herself of how she is supposed to make use of her sexy image. It is revealed that Rio did not have the sexy body figure that she now has when she was younger. Rio has a good friend in Konomi Baba.

Subaru Nagayoshi (永吉 昴, Nagayoshi Subaru)
Voiced by: Yuka Saitō
Specialty type: Dance
Subaru is a hot-blooded tomboy who obsesses over baseball, to the point of incorporating baseball terminology into her speech. She is energetic and outgoing too, though sometimes she can turn nervous and head out. Her tomboyish attitude stems from being raised with four older brothers who have to look after her as they all hardly ever see their parents, who are often out on their business.

Momoko Suō (周防 桃子, Suō Momoko)
Voiced by: Keiko Watanabe
Specialty type: Visual
An 11-year-old former child star, Momoko probably has more experience in the entertainment industry than many of her fellow idols. She is also a bit paranoid of others, preferring to stay away from others. According to her backstory, Momoko very likely had an unhappy life. Because of her activities, she almost never had time to play with kids of her age, much less make new friends. She doesn’t have a happy family life either – her parents frequently get into squabbles all the time. But ever since she became an idol, her life seems to have turned for the better, and she even has got a friend in Iku Nakatani.

Julia (ジュリア, Juria)
Voiced by: Aimi
Specialty type: Vocal
Julia is a young girl who aspires to become a punk rocker. She loves singing and hates doing things half-heartedly, though she tends to be flustered whenever she is dressed in such a girly idol costume. According to her backstory, Julia accidentally signed up to 765 Production, thinking it is a talent agency for rock musicians. However, she immediately asked the Producer to keep her contract anyway just as he was about to cancel it.
Julia is not even her real name, and for some reason, she is reluctant to reveal her real name to anyone.

Tsumugi Shiraishi (白石 紬, Shiraishi Tsumugi)
Voiced by: Saki Minami
Introduced in Theater Days, Tsumugi is a refined girl who speaks politely, but tends to be a little quick. She is serious and sharp-tongued, and often has bad presumptions about anything. She specializes in kimono dress and has enthusiasm in traditional Japanese things. She was scouted when the producer went to her parents’ kimono shop to return clothing.
She debuted in the Blooming Clover manga in chapter 7.

==== Angel idols ====
Tsubasa Ibuki (伊吹 翼, Ibuki Tsubasa)
Voiced by: Machico
Specialty type: Visual
Tsubasa is an easygoing girl who has a big interest in fashion, always going after the latest trends she can get. She also happens to be a big fan of Miki Hoshii, even to the point of becoming an idol herself. Despite her obsession with fashion, Tsubasa is still pretty naive and has an innocent perception of the world at first, especially when it comes to love and work.

Elena Shimabara (島原 エレナ, Shimabara Erena)
Voiced by: Asuka Kakumoto
Specialty type: Dance
Born in Brazil, Elena is an energetic young girl who wants to make people around her happy. Despite having stayed in Brazil for only six years, she is still fascinated by the carnivals and soccer. It is known that her mother is Brazilian, while her father is Japanese. Elena likes to hang out with Kotoha Tanaka and Megumi Tokoro.

Serika Hakozaki (箱崎 星梨花, Hakozaki Serika)
Voiced by: Momo Asakura
Specialty type: Vocal
Serika is a friendly, good-natured young girl who lived a sheltered life before becoming an idol. Because of this, she doesn’t get to know many ordinary things, for example what a family restaurant is. Her parents are in fact very protective of her, and her father even worries about her idol activities, though he does love to see how she is having much fun singing. It is known that Serika has a Border Collie named Junior, and can play violin.

Akane Nonohara (野々原 茜, Nonohara Akane)
Voiced by: Saki Ogasawara
Specialty type: Dance
Akane is a loud and erratic girl who fawns over her own cuteness. While she refers to herself as the "cutest girl on the planet", in reality she is always desperate to make people happy, as they tend to find her annoying. More often than not, Akane incorporates cats into her persona, even going so far as to get dressed in cat ears and make a cat paw pose, not to mention slip "nya" into her speech. It is known that Akane has a doll featuring her likeness and really loves pudding.

Anna Mochizuki (望月 杏奈, Mochizuki Anna)
Voiced by: Shiina Natsukawa
Specialty type: Vocal
A shy and quiet gamer, Anna always looks like she is tired whenever she is not doing anything else. Her only interests are video games and singing. But whenever she performs on stage, she inexplicably becomes energetic and lively. Her best friend is Yuriko Nanao, with whom she plays in an MMORPG, where Anna goes by the name of 'Vivid_Rabbit'.

Hinata Kinoshita (木下 ひなた, Kinoshita Hinata)
Voiced by: Nao Tamura
Specialty type: Vocal
Born to a family of apple farmers in Hokkaido, Hinata is a gentle and innocent young girl who is honest to a fault to the point of being gullible enough to believe in others’ lies. Coming from a rural region, she is uncomfortable with life in such a big city as Tokyo and, as implied in her profile, she has no knowledge about the entertainment industry in general, and the idea of being an idol in particular. Also owing to her background, Hinata speaks in an audible Hokkaido dialect and likes gardening.

Konomi Baba (馬場 このみ, Baba Konomi)
Voiced by: Minami Takahashi
Specialty type: Dance
Despite being the oldest of the cast of Million Live! – she is in fact 24 years old – Konomi has a short stature for her age, and thus has a big complex about it. Because of this, she is always trying to get others to treat her as an adult instead of a kid. Even then, she is actually easygoing and very reliable to others, especially Rio Momose. According to her backstory, Konomi originally applied for a job at 765 Production as an office lady, but her application was somehow misplaced. As a result, she ended up being offered a job as an idol for 765 Production instead.

Tamaki Ōgami (大神 環, Ōgami Tamaki)
Voiced by: Eri Inagawa
Specialty type: Dance
A cheerful and curious extrovert, Tamaki has a great passion for nature, suggesting she comes from the countryside. Having spent most of her time climbing trees, playing with animals, and swimming in the river, she is used to the outdoors and also has a hobby of capturing insects for collection. However, during her earlier life, Tamaki rarely met other kids, causing her to feel lonely very quickly. She then decided to become an idol because she heard that she could make friends that way. Despite her rustic appearance, Tamaki also enjoys sentai and often mimics sentai poses.

Fūka Toyokawa (豊川 風花, Toyokawa Fūka)
Voiced by: Rie Suegara
Specialty type: Visual
A former hospital nurse, Fūka is a gentle and caring young woman who can’t refuse to do someone a favor, even if at her own expense. The bustiest of the cast of Million Live!, she has a complex about her large breasts and is easily embarrassed every time she is asked to do something people would think of as sexy. The reason why she became an idol is in fact to make people think of her not just for her large breasts.

Miya Miyao (宮尾 美也, Miyao Miya)
Voiced by: Chōcho Kiritani
Specialty type: Visual
Miya is an easygoing, but also airheaded girl who does anything she does with a my-pace approach, though she can be mischievous too. Believing that dreaming big is a good thing to do, she decided to become an idol so she can bring happiness to people as long as she can keep a smile. Her airheadedness aside, Miya can play shōgi and gō, having played them with the elders at a board game club, and she can make sandwiches, which is also her favorite food.
When first announced, Miya’s initial idol profile picture had different hair and eye colors from all other profile pictures of hers. Once the Million Live! game was released, this was fixed to make all colorings consistent.

Karen Shinomiya (篠宮 可憐, Shinomiya Karen)
Voiced by: Yui Kondo
Specialty type: Visual
A shy and reserved girl, Karen always refers to herself as someone with nothing that stands out. She is also insecure about herself, and is often afraid of other people. This, in turn, motivated her to become an idol, so as to change herself for the better. Ever since then, Karen has been trying to not let her cowardice get in the way of her new life as an idol.

Reika Kitakami (北上 麗花, Kitakami Reika)
Voiced by: Emi Hirayama
Specialty type: Dance
Reika is a kind-hearted young woman who can be unpredictable at times. She often confuses insults with compliments, imagines weird ideas of giving surprises for others, and so on. Overall, Reika’s personality can be described as carefree and childish. It is known that Reika’s mother was an opera singer.

Kaori Sakuramori (桜守 歌織, Sakuramori Kaori)
Voiced by: Arisa Kōri
Introduced in Theater Days, Kaori is an elegant and mature former music schoolteacher. The daughter of a Japan Self-Defense Force officer, she headlined the Japan Ground Self-Defense Force Music Corps as the Songstress of the SDF (自衛隊の歌姫, Jieitai no Utahime), before being scouted at an SDF festival.

== 961 Production ==
A talent agency introduced in The Idolmaster SP as the rival to 765 Production. In the anime adaptation, 961 Pro is a much more established talent agency compared to 765 Pro.

=== 961 idols ===
Leon (伶音, Reon)
Voiced by: Minori Chihara
Introduced in The Idolmaster One For All, Leon is a powerful idol who trains all day and is always running off to auditions. Other than that, not very much is known about her.
In The Idolmaster Starlit Season, Leon forms a new unit with fellow 961 Pro idols Shika and Aya, named Diamant.

Shika (詩花, Shika)
Voiced by: Rie Takahashi
Introduced in The Idolmaster Stella Stage, Shika is an idol for 961 Pro with some kind of familial relationship to the president of 961 Pro. Born and raised in Austria, she has come to Japan only recently. Because of this, Shika makes a liberal use of German words and phrases in her speech and is unfamiliar with Japanese culture and customs.
In The Idolmaster Starlit Season, Shika forms a new unit with fellow 961 Pro idols Leon and Aya, named Diamant.

=== 961 staff ===
Takao Kuroi (黒井 崇男, Kuroi Takao)
Voiced by: Takehito Koyasu
The president of 961 Production, as well as Project Fairy and Jupiter's producer before their departure. Like most other producers, he's not seen, but as with the heads of other talent agencies, he appears as a silhouette, though the anime adaptation does give him a physical appearance, just not his face. After his original idols, Project Fairy, joined the rival 765 Pro in The Idolmaster 2, he formed a new idol group called Jupiter, composed of male idols. As of One For All, Jupiter had left 961 Pro, as confirmed in the anime adaptation. As a result, Kuroi hired a new idol named Leon.
Kuroi is a cruel and ruthless businessman who will do anything, legal or not, to promote his idols, but also take down 765 Pro, even going so far as to tell malicious lies about 765 Pro to idols under his tutelage. He tends to treat his idols as expendable pawns, using them solely for his personal gains. He is very picky too, choosing the most appealing and talented individuals available as his idols and employing underhanded business strategies to promote them, rather than allowing them to build their abilities naturally, the complete opposite of Junjirō's methods.
Kuroi and Junjirō Takagi were once old colleagues and friends, but they later had a falling out after Junjirō disagreed with how Kuroi raised his idols. Since that incident, Kuroi has vowed to destroy Junjirō, his company and his idols, all by any means necessary.
His company is in fact named after him, as "961" is pronounced ku-ro-i in Japanese.

=== Gokugetsu Academy ===
An idol training school affiliated with 961 Production, founded by Kuroi, who himself is also its principal. In Gakuen Idolmaster, this establishment serves as a rival to Hatsuboshi Academy.

Rinha Kaya (賀陽 燐羽, Kaya Rinha)
Voiced by: Kazuki Asami
Rinha is a former middle school idol who was once part of an idol group named "SyngUp!", which disbanded long before. She then transferred to Gokugetsu Academy via scholarship.

Nadeshiko Aoi (藍井 撫子, Aoi Nadeshiko)
Voiced by: Yuki Wakai
Born to a wealthy family, Nadeshiko is a very popular idol who uses influence from her family to amass such a large number of fans. She idolizes Shion Shirakusa, whom she affectionately considers an older-sister figure, unaware that Shion is merely using her.

Shion Shirakusa (白草 四音, Shirakusa Shion)
Voiced by: Minami Tanaka
Gokugetsu Academy's current Number 1 idol, Shion has all that she's got to become that way. In reality, she is a very ruthless idol who kicks fellow idols down to reach her current status and uses her stardom as little more than a means to an end.

Gekka Shirakusa (白草 月花, Shirakusa Gekka)
Voiced by: Yū Serizawa
Shion's older sister, Gekka is Gokugetsu Academy's renowned top idol who's hardly ever seen around, even at Gokugetsu, since she is active mostly in the United States.

== 876 Production ==
The talent agency introduced in and, so far, only prominently appearing in The Idolmaster Dearly Stars.

=== Dearly Stars ===
Three new idols introduced in The Idolmaster Dearly Stars, all of whom are/were affiliated with 876 Production. They also made cameo appearances in other games and a handful of episodes in the anime. Each of them also received a three-volume manga series devoted to individual story lines in the game.

Ai Hidaka (日高 愛, Hidaka Ai)
Voiced by: Haruka Tomatsu
Referred to by fans as the "younger clone" of Haruka, Ai can be described as an unstoppable mini-tank who never loses heart despite her shortcomings and lack of experience. She is known to have a massive amount of energy, which unfortunately tends to work against her in auditions as her energy would end up overwhelming the judges. Her mother, Mai, was in fact one of the most well-known idols in Japan before she became pregnant with Ai when she was only 15 years old. As a result, 876 Pro took interest in promoting her as Mai's daughter, but Ai insists on becoming a popular idol on her own. This becomes a problem when Mai suddenly returns to the stage, causing Ai to feel that she has to contend with being compared to her own mother. She decides to face her head-on, using her mother's own song, "ALIVE", and defeat her with it. Afterwards, she continues on her own as an idol independent of her mother's celebrity status.
In the PlayStation 3 version of The Idolmaster 2, Ai appears as a DLC character in Catalog 3 as a S4U character. Once she is unlocked in S4U, players can have her perform with either of the songs "ALIVE" or "Go My Way".

Eri Mizutani (水谷 絵理, Mizutani Eri)
Voiced by: Kana Hanazawa
A former hikikomori and internet celebrity known online as "Ellie", Eri was scouted to become an idol in real life. While she can perform well online, in real life, she is very shy, and is uncomfortable talking to loud people. She is also known to like cats. Owing to her background revolving around the internet, she's also really prone to spouting out internet memes. As Eri begins to grow more as a live idol, she becomes more interested in how other idols are able to stand out. But when Eri encounters a series of strange incidents, the truth about her producer, Reiko Ozaki, comes out as she also reveals her troubled past as an idol, when she had to deal with the gossips revolving around her on the net. In response, Eri decides to trust in her producer as she adapts Ozaki's unfinished song "Precog" and continues her career as a live idol.
In the PlayStation 3 version of The Idolmaster 2, Eri appears as a DLC character in Catalog 5 as a S4U character. Once she is unlocked in S4U, players can have her perform with either of the songs "Precog" or "Shiny Smile".

Ryō Akizuki (秋月 涼, Akizuki Ryō)
Voiced by: Yūko Sanpei
Ritsuko's younger cousin who's very soft-spoken compared to her, Ryō is actually a boy who poses as a female idol, keeping that a secret from his co-workers at 876 Production. Because of his feminine appearance, he was often mistaken for a girl, and so he wanted to become a male idol, but when he went to see Ritsuko about it, she took him to 876 Pro to become one. There, he ended up covering for a female idol, much to his chagrin. He did very well in the audition and, as a result, the agency hired him as a female idol anyway. Later, he has to switch between glasses and contact lenses, depending on whether or not he is doing his idol work, so as to better distinguish between his male and female personas.
After a series of pranks done by rival idol Yumeko Sakurai, Ryō successfully befriends her and becomes more motivated by her dreams, allowing him to refocus on becoming a popular male idol, the very dream he always had in the first place. Starting with Sōichi Takeda writing "Dazzling World" for him to compete with Chihaya, Ryō begins to pick up momentum to finally convince the staff to let him start his career from the ground up as a male idol. He finally gets to appear on Takeda's "Old Whistle" radio show. By the end of the story, he comes to be accepted by his fans and becomes more popular than ever as he continues on his dream.
In the PlayStation 3 version of The Idolmaster 2, Ryō appears as a DLC character in Catalog 7 as a S4U character. Once he is unlocked in S4U, players can have him perform with either of the songs "Dazzling World" or "Kiramekirari".
Ryō later returns in The Idolmaster SideM, where he now performs as a proper male idol as he moves to 315 Production, as part of the F-LAGS idol unit. This makes him the only Dearly Stars main character to make another major appearance.

=== 876 staff ===
Minori Ishikawa (石川実, Ishikawa Minori)
Voiced by: Risa Hayamizu (Splash Red drama CD)
Ishikawa is the president of 876 Production. She is never seen as anything but a silhouette, but appears much more often than her 765 Pro counterpart, Jun'ichirō Takagi. She is said to be very good friends with both President Takagi and Yukio Igarashi. While she does believe in her idols like Takagi does, Ishikawa never hesitates to use anything she has in store for her idols to make them popular, like Mai's celebrity for Ai and Ryō's charm as a girl for him.

Manami Okamoto (岡本 まなみ, Okamoto Manami)
Manami acts as manager to both Ai and Ryō, though she focuses more on Ai due to her insecurity. Because of this, the two form a close bond. Manami has a gentle, hardworking, and kind personality, although she can be rather ditzy sometimes.

== Cinderella Girls ==
The Idolmaster Cinderella Girls was released in late 2011. Initially consisting of 84 idols, the game features a total of 190 idols as of November 2018, making it by far the largest The Idolmaster subseries, though only 99 of them are voiced as of December 2023. The idols here are categorized into three personality archetypes: Cute (キュート, Kyūto), Cool (クール, Kūru), and Passion (パッション, Passhon).

=== 346 Production ===
A talent agency that serves as the main focus of The Idolmaster Cinderella Girls, especially its TV anime series. It is likely the largest talent agency in The Idolmaster series, having many talent divisions and a very large office.

==== Cinderella Project ====
Uzuki Shimamura (島村 卯月, Shimamura Uzuki)
Voiced by: Ayaka Ōhashi
A lively young girl who is scouted by the Producer for the Cinderella Project, she was originally taking personal lessons at a training agency to become an idol, but after being scouted for the Cinderella Project, she took lessons at the 346 Production facilities. She is similar to Haruka judging from her personality, although her voice and looks are quite different. She is almost always cheerful and optimistic, and is happy to have finally become an idol. Although sometimes overly emotional, she generally acts as the friendly-type "good girl". Scouted early on, she doesn't get to do any work at first, due to not enough girls being in the project at the time. Once two more girls are recruited, she is grouped into a unit called "New Generations" with Rin and Mio, after the three performed as backup dancers onstage for Mika.
Her Cinderella Master single, released on August 8, 2012, charted on the Oricon Singles Chart for eight weeks and topped at No. 12 on August 20.

Rin Shibuya (渋谷 凛, Shibuya Rin)
Voiced by: Ayaka Fukuhara
A cool girl whose family runs a flower shop. She is similar to Chihaya in looks and demeanor. She originally had no interest in the idea of being an idol, even hating it, but the Producer managed to convince her to give it a try after meeting with her several times. Even after she becomes an idol, she maintains her cool and somewhat serious attitude, though she starts to enjoy singing and dancing on stage. Although cool and serious, she has a more feminine side that shows on occasion, usually when she is flustered or surprised by others. She is part of the unit "New Generations" with Uzuki and Mio.
Her Cinderella Master single, released on April 18, 2012, charted on the Oricon Singles Chart for eight weeks and topped at No. 6 on April 30.

Mio Honda (本田 未央, Honda Mio)
Voiced by: Sayuri Hara
Mio is an energetic girl who tends to get ahead of herself when it comes to wanting to become a popular idol. She is the de facto leader of "New Generations" and seems somewhat similar to the Futami twins, Ami and Mami, both in her expression and playful attitude. She even has a habit of referring to people around her with nicknames, much like the Futami twins. Although she had auditioned for the Cinderella Project before, she came up short. She eventually managed to get through on her second try. She tends to be very good with singing and dancing, though she can get tired quite easily during lessons. During the first mini-concert for "New Generations" to promote their Debut CD, she became disappointed with the small crowd that turned up and almost quit being an idol altogether because of it. After some time, the Producer and fellow idols convinced Mio to stay as an idol, and she has since been less focused on the size of crowds at concerts, instead focusing on the excitement of the crowd.
Her Cinderella Master single, released on January 23, 2013, charted on the Oricon Singles Chart for four weeks and topped at No. 9 on February 4.

Kanako Mimura (三村 かな子, Mimura Kanako)
Voiced by: Yuka Ōtsubo
Kanako is a girl who enjoys doing idol work, but is also a little nervous at times. Her hobby is making sweets. She seems similar in demeanor to Azusa, having a tendency to be distraught when things do not go as planned. However, unlike Azusa, she tends to get flustered and nervous when things go wrong, rather than not really caring all that much. She enjoys wearing cute outfits like Chieri, and is also somewhat slow on the uptake for certain things. She still maintains a generally positive outlook on most things despite this. She is part of the unit called "Candy Island" with Chieri and Anzu.
Her Cinderella Master single, released on April 18, 2012, charted on the Oricon Singles Chart for seven weeks and topped at No. 6 on April 30.

Chieri Ogata (緒方 智絵里, Ogata Chieri)
Voiced by: Naomi Ōzora
Chieri is a very shy girl with a demeanor and voice similar to Yukiho. She has a kind of stage fright, as she is incredibly nervous whenever on stage, although she seems to be able to control herself somewhat when she thinks of the audience as frogs. It seems she is even more nervous when her fellow idols are on stage too instead of her, as she was very anxious during the performance where "New Generations" was doing the backup dancing at Rika's concert. She carries a four-leaf clover around with her, although it's unknown if she keeps it for luck, or just happens to like clovers. She is in the unit "Candy Island" along with Anzu and Kanako.
Her Cinderella Master single, released on November 13, 2013, charted on the Oricon Singles Chart for four weeks and topped at No. 15 on November 25.

Miku Maekawa (前川 みく, Maekawa Miku)
Voiced by: Natsumi Takamori
Miku is a girl aiming to be a cute pop idol. She seems similar in demeanor to Iori, especially with her different attitudes on stage and off. She almost always wears cat ears and punctuates her sentences with the kitty sound "nya" (Japanese onomatopoeia for "meow"). She has an inexplicable affinity for cats, although she doesn't have one as a pet, and even hates fish. Although she really wants to act cute, she can get mad when she feels she isn't getting enough attention. She appears to have a large collection of different cat ears, but tends to always wear the same pair at work. According to her, she works hard like a cat, and is always ready for work. She carries cat ears everywhere she goes so she can be ready for work at any time. She often has a totally different attitude when not on camera or onstage. However, as soon as she knows the fans are watching, she puts on the cat ears and acts like a cute and innocent idol. She is one half of the unit "Asterisk" along with Riina.
Her Cinderella Master single, released on August 8, 2012, charted on the Oricon Singles Chart for eight weeks and topped at No. 11 on August 20.

Anzu Futaba (双葉 杏, Futaba Anzu)
Voiced by: Hiromi Igarashi
Anzu is a young reclusive girl who's so lazy she detests the idea of work itself. She tends to be similar to Miki, although much smaller in figure despite being older, with her lazy personality and tendency to fall asleep. She is usually seen sleeping at any possible time, especially during the early parts of the anime series. Her laziness is also highlighted when she and her fellow idols held a strike in protest of New Generations' debut, where Anzu demanded "8 days off every week". Although very lazy, she learns to work normally later on. She also seems to be a bit of a genius, as showcased when she was on a quiz show with her unit against a rival idol group, easily answering obscure questions and solving a complicated math problem incredibly fast in her head with almost no effort. Later on, she seems to have mostly done away with her laziness, but is still seen being somewhat lackadaisical about hard work. She is in the unit "Candy Island" along with Chieri and Kanako.
Her Cinderella Master single, released on April 18, 2012, charted on the Oricon Singles Chart for ten weeks and topped at No. 4 on April 30.

Riina Tada (多田 李衣菜, Tada Riina)
Voiced by: Ruriko Aoki
Riina is a girl who loves rock music and aspires to be a rock idol. She is somewhat similar in demeanor to Makoto. Although almost the opposite of Miku, she and Miku were paired up as a unit, mainly because they were the only idols who hadn't debuted at the time. After some seriously heated arguments and fights, they learned to get along and perform together, although they still tended to be at odds with each other often. Riina plays guitar, but apparently only knows some simple chords and has headphones on most of the time, listening to rock music. Like Miku, who has a large collection of cat ears, she has a large collection of headphones, but is always seen with the same pair at work. She has a great admiration for a young boy who tries out her guitar and plays an amazing sequence of riffs on it, despite him being left-handed and her guitar being a right-handed one. She also has a tendency to say that something is "rocking", usually when she likes something, like her unit's name, which was originally just a placeholder placed by the Producer, since the unit didn't have a name on the sign-up sheet for the idol festival. She is one half of the unit "Asterisk" along with Miku.
Her Cinderella Master single, released on January 23, 2013, charted on the Oricon Singles Chart for five weeks and topped at No. 7 on February 4.

Minami Nitta (新田 美波, Nitta Minami)
Voiced by: Aya Suzaki
Minami is a college student who plays lacrosse. She is similar to Ritsuko, being hardworking and responsible. She doesn't have a lot of character development, despite the fact that during the idol's training camp, she was elected as the Cinderella Project's supervisor due to being the oldest idol. However, she ended up overworking herself and fell sick during the idol fest, so she was initially unable to perform onstage. Later on, she managed to get over her sickness in time to perform with the rest of the idols during the finale. She is one half of the unit "Love Laika" along with Anastasia.
Her Cinderella Master single, released on May 22, 2013, charted on the Oricon Singles Chart for five weeks and topped at No. 10 on June 3.

Ranko Kanzaki (神崎 蘭子, Kanzaki Ranko)
Voiced by: Maaya Uchida
Ranko is a girl who dresses in goth-loli style and speaks with strange phrases like role-play. Disregarding her strange speech, she is very similar in looks and demeanor to Takane. Her unusual style of speech makes it hard for the Producer to understand her, so much so that he writes down her phrases in a notebook along with their "translation." She is the only idol in the Cinderella Project to have debuted by herself rather than being part of any unit. Although she dresses in a goth-loli style and talks like she is from "the abyss" (according to her), she actually hates scary movies and stories, and is very easily frightened by such things. Initially, the Producer had decided to promote her debut and song with a straight-up horror theme, but he was told that she didn't like horrific things, so he changed it to a Gothic theme. During the idol fest, since Minami was unable to perform with Anastasia, she went on with her and performed with her surprisingly well, despite never having practiced it (although she returned to solo work afterwards). Her stage name is "Rosenburg Engel".
Her Cinderella Master single, released on August 8, 2012, charted on the Oricon Singles Chart for thirteen weeks and topped at No. 9 on August 20.

Anastasia (アナスタシア, Anasutashia)
Voiced by: Sumire Uesaka
Nicknamed "Anya", she is a half-Russian girl. She seems quite similar to Takane, such as her native country not being Japan and her notice of certain small details that other tend to miss. Since she is Russian, she often speaks in Russian accidentally before remembering to switch back to Japanese, though she is not as fluent in Japanese. However, she has no problem in listening to any conversation in Japanese, seemingly able to understand it. She often asks Minami how to say certain things in Japanese or whether she said something correctly or not. She is very talented in singing initially, which lead to her being paired with Minami, who is apparently very hardworking. She is one half of the unit "Love Laika" along with Minami.
Her Cinderella Master single, released on November 13, 2013, charted on the Oricon Singles Chart for six weeks and topped at No. 13 on November 25.

Miria Akagi (赤城 みりあ, Akagi Miria)
Voiced by: Tomoyo Kurosawa
Miria is an innocent 11-year-old girl. She seems somewhat similar to Hibiki, being primarily energetic and cheerful. She is the youngest idol in the Cinderella Project and tends to hug and cling to older girls, especially Kirari. Although incredibly innocent, she can be a bit troublesome at times, hardly ever bothering to stop the other girls from harassing or pranking the Producer, and she even once helped Anzu flee from the other idols' sights so she could sleep all day. She is part of the unit "Dekoration" along with Kirari and Rika.
In the spin-off manga U149, she is not yet a member of Cinderella Project, but rather of the Third Entertainment Division in a not yet named talent agency. She is also one of the nine idols appearing in the anime adaptation of that same manga, making her the only main character in the original Cinderella Girls anime adaptation to appear as a main character in another anime adaptation of the subseries.
Her Cinderella Master single, released on May 22, 2013, charted on the Oricon Singles Chart for five weeks and topped at No. 11 on June 3.

Rika Jōgasaki (城ヶ崎 莉嘉, Jōgasaki Rika)
Voiced by: Nozomi Yamamoto
Rika is the 12-year-old younger sister of fellow 346 Production idol, Mika Jōgasaki. She seems similar to Ai with her attitude on becoming well known. Her sister wanted her to join her as part of the idol company so they could perform together in the future, but she stayed with the Cinderella Project to become a star without flaunting her sister's already-established popularity. Whenever she runs into her sister, she will exclaim "Onee-chan!" and hug her or cling to her obsessively. She is part of the unit "Dekoration" along with Kirari and Miria.
Her Cinderella Master single, released on April 18, 2012, charted on the Oricon Singles Chart for seven weeks and topped at No. 9 on April 30.

Kirari Moroboshi (諸星 きらり, Moroboshi Kirari)
Voiced by: Rei Matsuzaki
Kirari is a tall 17-year-old girl. She clings to Anzu and keeps her in check like an older sister, but gets put into a different unit than her. She is somewhat similar to Yayoi with her hyperactive personality, although much larger in figure and three years older – she is the tallest female idol in the entire franchise as of her introduction. Similar to Azusa, she doesn't mind the small things and being an "older sister" type, and tends to be laid-back with her approach to work and events. Although the leader of her group, her partners tend to be able to do whatever they want, because she doesn't always effectively take charge or keep them in check like she does with Anzu. She is part of the unit "Dekoration" along with Rika and Miria.
Her Cinderella Master single, released on August 8, 2012, charted on the Oricon Singles Chart for seven weeks and topped at No. 10 on August 20.

==== 346 staff ====
Producer (プロデューサー, Purodūsā)
Voiced by: Shunsuke Takeuchi
The producer of the Cinderella Project who also works as a scout for 346 Production, he is the protagonist of The Idolmaster Cinderella Girls TV anime series. He has a large build and an intimidating face, but is overly polite and habitually says things rather bluntly. He often has trouble communicating with others as his scary-looking physique causes people to try to avoid him.

Manager Imanishi (今西部長, Imanishi-buchō)
Voiced by: Fuminori Komatsu
The general manager of Cinderalla Project.

Chihiro Senkawa (千川 ちひろ, Senkawa Chihiro)
Voiced by: Rina Satō
The Producer's secretary.

Master Trainer (マスタートレーナー, Masutā torēnā), Veteran Trainer (ベテラントレーナー, Beteran Torēnā), Trainer (トレーナー, Torēnā), and Rookie Trainer (ルーキートレーナー, Rūkī Torēnā)
Voiced by: Ayumi Fujimura (2011-2022); Ayane Sakura (2022-)
The four trainer sisters.

Executive Director Mishiro (美城常務, Mishiro Jōmu)
Voiced by: Atsuko Tanaka
The executive director of 346 Pro's idol division. She serves as the main antagonist to the Producer.

=== Third Entertainment Division ===
The division of an unnamed talent agency consisting entirely of idols under the age of 12, also noted for the fact that they all have the height of below 149 cm. They are the central characters in the spin-off manga U149 and its television anime adaptation. Later in the anime, the division becomes known as U149, from the aforementioned height limit.

Arisu Tachibana (橘 ありす, Tachibana Arisu)
Voiced by: Amina Satō
A 12-year-old idol who is responsible and studious despite her tender age. Because she is well-behaved, her parents tend to overlook her and mind their own business most of their time, causing her to feel lonely often. Her favourite food is strawberries and some of her idol costumes are themed around them.
Her Cinderella Master single, released on November 18, 2015, charted on the Oricon Singles Chart for 15 weeks and topped at No. 8 on November 30.

Momoka Sakurai (櫻井 桃華, Sakurai Momoka)
Voiced by: Haruka Terui
A daughter of a wealthy family business owner, she has a mature composture for her age, capable of behaving well and politely. She is a member of Totokira Gakuen in the original Cinderella Girls anime.
Her Cinderella Master single, released on November 18, 2015, charted on the Oricon Singles Chart for eleven weeks and topped at No. 12 on November 30.

Miria Akagi (赤城 みりあ, Akagi Miria)
Please refer to the Cinderella Project section

Risa Matoba (的場 梨沙, Matoba Risa)
Voiced by: Hana Tamegai
A confident daddy's girl who came into the idol business to please him. She has a taste for leopard and tiger prints.
She was one of the five idols who appeared in the November 2019 "Spin-off!" short.

Haru Yūki (結城 晴, Yūki Haru)
Voiced by: Makoto Koichi
A 12-year-old tomboy who's very athletic for her age, she is talented at sports, particularly soccer. Fittingly, she speaks in a masculine manner, even going so far as to refer to herself as "ore", and hates to wear cute and frilly outfits. In fact, she seems reluctant to become an idol, though she later admits to having enjoyed it anyway.
According to her backstory in the U149 anime, her father got her to debut as an idol in hopes that she would learn to wear more feminine clothing.

Chie Sasaki (佐々木 千枝, Sasaki Chie)
Voiced by: Asaka Imai
A well-mannered, meek young girl, she is always glad to help others, but hesitates to show up out of shyness. She also happens to be talented at sewing and fashion design.

Kaoru Ryuzaki (龍崎 薫, Ryūzaki Kaoru)
Voiced by: Natsumi Haruse
A nine-year-old idol who previously appeared in a children's TV show. She calls Producer sensei and is an excellent chef who teaches another idol how to bake cookies. She is a member of Totokira Gakuen beginning in episode 17 of the original Cinderella Girls anime.

Nina Ichihara (市原 仁奈, Ichihara Nina)
Voiced by: Misaki Kuno
The youngest characters in the entire Idolmaster franchise at the age of 8, she is a wildly imaginative girl who loves to wear animal kigurumi and attract attention to herself. It is revealed in the U149 anime that her father is currently away overseas and her mother is too busy at work, causing her to feel lonely.
Her Cinderella Master single, released on February 4, 2015, charted on the Oricon Singles Chart for five weeks and topped at No. 7 on February 16.

Koharu Koga (古賀小春, Koga Koharu)
Voiced by: Yuri Komori
An idol who likes and aspires to be a princess. She is known to have a pet iguana.
She was voiced through the U149 television anime series.

==== Staff ====
Producer (プロデューサー, Purodūsā)
Voiced by: Yūki Yonai
The producer for an unnamed talent agency. He seems to prefer older girls, but he is assigned to manage the Third Entertainment Division, composed of younger idols, much to his chagrin. He is also shown to be barely taller than all of the division idols. In the anime, he has an older sister and a nephew.

=== Cute idols ===
Nana Abe (安部 菜々, Abe Nana)
Voiced by: Marie Miyake
An aspiring seiyū idol who claims to be an "eternally 17-years old" alien from Planet Usamin (ウサミン星人, Usamin-seijin), a supposed planet she claims is "one hour away via train". In the anime version, she has a temp job at 346 Pro's cafe. She was fired from her weathercaster job.
Her Cinderella Master single, released on May 22, 2013, charted on the Oricon Singles Chart for six weeks and topped at No. 7 on June 3.

Karin Domyoji (道明寺 歌鈴, Dōmyōji Karin)
Voiced by: Hiyori Nitta
A clumsy miko at her parents' shrine, she decided to become an idol, thinking idol activities could help free herself from the "God of Clumsiness". Because of her background, she integrates a Shinto motif into her attire. In episode 14 of the anime, she is summoned alongside Koume to remove Producer. In U149, she is a radio personality alongside Aiko in the unit Indigo Bell (インディゴ・ベル, Indigo Beru).

Rina Fujimoto (藤本 里奈, Fujimoto Rina)
Voiced by: Mayumi Kaneko
A gyaru from the Shōnan region who dropped out of high school for financial reasons. She holds a moped license and tones down her makeup during her idol activities. She appears in episodes 10 and 25 of the anime and is depicted in the "Wild Wind Girl" spinoff manga as being with Takumi.

Anzu Futaba (双葉 杏, Futaba Anzu)
Please refer to the Cinderella Project section

Mirei Hayasaka (早坂 美玲, Hayasaka Mirei)
Voiced by: Ayaka Asai
A former rival idol in the Sendai area who wears one eye patch at a time. She has a lone-wolf personality and was initially wary of Producer. She is a member of the idol unit Individuals (インディヴィジュアルズ, Indivijuaruzu) with Syoko and Nono. She has a non-speaking appearance in episode 25 of the anime.

Shiki Ichinose (一ノ瀬 志希, Ichinose Shiki)
Voiced by: Kotomi Aihara
An anemic olfactophile who specializes in science experiments and chemistry and uses a perfume from her scientist father. Her interest in Producer came from the latter's smell. She and Frederica form the idol unit Lazy Lazy (レイジー・レイジー) in U149.
Her Cinderella Master single, released on November 18, 2015, charted on the Oricon Singles Chart for 40 weeks and topped at No. 11 on November 30.
She was one of the five idols who appeared in the November 2019 "Spin-off!" short.

Kyoko Igarashi (五十嵐 響子, Igarashi Kyōko)
Voiced by: Atsumi Tanezaki
An idol with a helping personality who specializes in housework, whose parents' house are within the sightline of the Tottori Sand Dunes. She makes a voiceless cameo in episode 25 where she forms Pink Check School with Uzuki and Miho, and acts as an event MC in chapter 49 of U149.
Her Cinderella Master single, released on March 2, 2016, charted on the Oricon Singles Chart for six weeks and topped at No. 9 on March 14.

Sae Kobayakawa (小早川 紗枝, Kobayakawa Sae)
Voiced by: Rika Tachibana
A yamato nadeshiko fluent in kyō-kotoba who is an only child from a traditionalist family nearby the Kamo River. Skilled in buyō, koto, and Ogura Hyakunin Isshu, she becomes an idol so she could get to learn about the outside world. She appears in "Muscle Castle" with Sachiko and Yuki in episode 9 of the anime and appears in a booth with Azuki, Kako, and Syuko.
Her Cinderella Master single, released on April 30, 2014, charted on the Oricon Singles Chart for 13 weeks and topped at No. 11 on May 12.

Koharu Koga (古賀小春, Koga Koharu)
Please refer to the Third Entertainment Division section

Miho Kohinata (小日向 美穂, Kohinata Miho)
Voiced by: Minami Tsuda
A shy idol with a stammer. She likes stuffed animals is revealed to have a teddy bear called "Producer-kun" in Cinderella Theater. In the anime, she is a member of the idol units Happy Princess and Pink Check School (ピンクチェックスクール) by the end of episode 25 of the anime.
Her Cinderella Master single, released on January 23, 2013, charted on the Oricon Singles Chart for five weeks and topped at No. 6 on February 4.

Sachiko Koshimizu (輿水幸子, Koshimizu Sachiko)
Voiced by: Ayana Taketatsu
A homework helper with a GPA of 4.0 who is a rival idol in her native Saitama Prefecture. She is a member of the idol unit Kawaiiboku and 142's (カワイイボクと142's, Kawaiiboku to 142's) with Koume and Syoko, two idols with the same height as Sachiko. She appears in the anime as a contestant in Muscle Castle alongside Sae and Yuki and appears in episode 38 of U149.
Her Cinderella Master single, released on May 22, 2013, charted on the Oricon Singles Chart for seven weeks and topped at No. 6 on June 3.

Chitose Kurosaki (黒埼 ちとせ, Kurosaki Chitose)
Voiced by: Kaoru Sakura
A third-year high school student with grade retention. She claims descent from vampires, takes walks under the moonlight, and has Chiyo as her housekeeper. She sees her idol career as an opportunity to emancipate Chiyo.
She was one of the five idols who appeared in the November 2019 "Spin-off!" short.

Miku Maekawa (前川 みく, Maekawa Miku)
Please refer to the Cinderella Project section

Kanako Mimura (三村 かな子, Mimura Kanako)
Please refer to the Cinderella Project section

Frederica Miyamoto (宮本 フレデリカ, Miyamoto Furederika)
Voiced by: Asami Takano
A care-free college student fashionista who is a hāfu born to a French mother. She moved from Paris to Japan aged five and has forgotten to speak French language. She often flirts with Producer. She appears as a member of Project:Krone in the anime and calls her smartphone camera Fredericamera (フレデリカメラ, Furederikamera) in the manga. She and Shiki form the idol unit Lazy Lazy (レイジー・レイジー) in U149.
Her Cinderella Master single, released on February 4, 2015, charted on the Oricon Singles Chart for six weeks and topped at No. 11 on February 16.

Yukari Mizumoto (水本 ゆかり, Mizumoto Yukari)
Voiced by: Akane Fujita
A refined flutist who began learning the skill since childhood. She is shown to have a close relationship with Yuka Nakano to the point where Noriko calls it "Yukayuka" (ゆかゆか). In the anime, she eats crepes with the two and plays her trademark instrument at Ranko's performance.

Atsumi Munakata (棟方 愛海, Munakata Atsumi)
Voiced by: Ayaka Fujimoto
An energetic pervert who got into the business due to her interest in the female body, and schemes to grope other idols' breasts whenever she can. She is interested in female friends, even engaging in skinship with them. She received a voice actress for a speaking appearance in episode 23 of Cinderella Girls Theater, eventually appearing in multiple songs.

Yuka Nakano (中野 有香, Nakano Yuka)
Voiced by: Shino Shimoji
A karateka who gets into an idol career to broaden her interests. She holds a national championship and a position as team captain. She is exceptionally strong and also cares about her abs. She is seen eating crepes with Noriko and Yukari in episode 10 of the anime.
Her Cinderella Master single, released on March 2, 2016, charted on the Oricon Singles Chart for eleven weeks and topped at No. 7 on March 14.

Chieri Ogata (緒方 智絵里, Ogata Chieri)
Please refer to the Cinderella Project section

Yūki Otokura (乙倉 悠貴, Otokura Yūki)
Voiced by: Yuki Nakashima
A former junior model who worries about her height of 164 centimetres (5.38 ft) and is a rival idol in her native Okayama Prefecture. A member of the track and field club, she is an athletic girl who drinks vegetable juice and takes daily runs.

Kotoka Saionji (西園寺 琴歌, Saionji Kotoka)
Voiced by: Yukari Anzai
A wealthy noble woman who has utmost respect to the Producer, and a devoted hard worker who spend extra time to improve herself when she isn't doing well, even though she was asked to be more casual. As a daughter of the family who runs one of the important company, and was directly sent by her father, she admits her inexperience in life and promise to work hard and give everything to became a good idol. She tends to involved in dangerous situations, knows nothing about cooking and having fear of heights due to her being a playful airhead.

Mayu Sakuma (佐久間 まゆ, Sakuma Mayu)
Voiced by: Yui Makino
A former photography model with yandere tendencies towards the Producer. While cold and jealous towards her idol colleagues at times, she is usually kind to them. In the anime, she is a member of the idol unit Happy Princess and first appears in episode 3; in episode 14 she engages in stalking towards Producer to get his birthday; and in episode 25 she is one of four idols (the others being Kanako, Noriko, and Shizuku) who give away candy to fans.
Her Cinderella Master single, released on November 13, 2013, charted on the Oricon Singles Chart for six weeks and topped at No. 11 on November 25.

Momoka Sakurai (櫻井 桃華, Sakurai Momoka)
Please refer to the Third Entertainment Division section

Hiromi Seki (関 裕美, Seki Hiromi)
Voiced by: Saya Aizawa
An idol with excellent skills in creating handmade accessories. During her debut, she was reluctant to engage in idol activities, but gradually gained confidence.

Noriko Shiina (椎名 法子, Shiina Noriko)
Voiced by: Chiyo Tomaru
Born from a family of confectionary bakers, she's a girl that having an immense obsession of donut-related things, often invites people to taste her food samples to help people uplift the mood, as her own admiration of helping people in need.

Uzuki Shimamura (島村 卯月, Shimamura Uzuki)
Please refer to the Cinderella Project section

Hotaru Shiragiku (白菊 ほたる, Shiragiku Hotaru)
Voiced by: Satomi Amano
A girl who suffers eternal bad luck in everything in her life except for her idol career due to her birth under an unlucky star, which she's quite aware of it and always apologize to people who affect of her misfortune. Before her meeting with the Producer at a TV show, every agency that she worked before always getting defunct, that she have considered to give up on her dream because of her misfortune, however the Producer is able to motivate her to find her own happiness and scouted her into the current agency.

Chiyo Shirayuki (白雪 千夜, Shirayuki Chiyo)
Voiced by: Risa Sekiguchi
A reserved girl who see herself having little value in life, outside helping her adopted sister Chitose. After suffered from a horrific accident who became an orphan at 12, Chitose's uncle invites her to the Kurosaki clan, which she choose to serve as a housekeeper to keep her name. Being a pragmatic, she's only having interactions with her classmates if she felt suited for. Even though she admits that she became an idol due to Chitose's request, she still wanted to become one of it in order to shine on her own way.

Akari Tsujino (辻野 あかり, Tsujino Akari)
Voiced by: Megu Umezawa
An honest country girl who came from her family-run apple farm in Yamagata Prefecture, and having favor of her hometown delicacies such as ramen and apples, but occasionally slips her accent when she was surprised or flustered. Initially, she's confused and doubt about the Producer's scouting offer, but after consulted by her family about her chance to learn about the idol career, she finally accept his offer and starts her own journey. Her family's disposition given to her although made her doubt about her efforts as an idol, but she always determined to rise up in her career.

Kozue Yusa (遊佐 こずえ, Yusa Kozue)
Voiced by: Maki Hanatani
An 11-year-old innocent girl who have a inquisitively absent-minded due to her sheltered life before being scouted by the Producer when she met him during sleeping. She's always drowsy in everyday life and tends to elongate end vowels and speaks entirely in Hiragana, even though Mio guided her to speak more normally with less ellipses.
She's also one of the central characters in the spin-off manga U149.

=== Cool idols ===
Anastasia (アナスタシア, Anasutashia)
Please refer to the Cinderella Project section

Hina Araki (荒木 比奈, Araki Hina)
Voiced by: Rui Tanabe
An unkempt otaku who ends her sentences with "~ssu" (〜っス) and is an aspiring mangaka who tends to have a feeling about being in Comiket. She originally had doubts of being an idol prior to the special training. She makes a non-speaking appearance in the anime as a member of Blue Napoleon.

Nanami Asari (浅利 七海, Asari Nanami)
Voiced by: Honoka Inoue
An aspiring and easygoing girl hailing from a fishing community in Aomori Prefecture. Because of this, she has a large liking of fish, and is often seen carrying a stuffed fish with her.

Hajime Fujiwara (藤原 肇, Fujiwara Hajime)
Voiced by: Minori Suzuki
A pottery master who also acted as a shopkeeper, which came from a lineage of renowned ceramic and porcelain craftsmen. Apart from that, she's also enjoys river fishing and acted as a protector for the innocence of the younger idols.

Kanade Hayami (速水 奏, Hayami Kanade)
Voiced by: Yuko Iida
A 17-year-old girl from Tokyo who have unpredictable flirting behavior around the Producer, and often takes work seriously while still being considerate to others. She keep herself distant to others despite being open from the first glance.
Her Cinderella Master single, released on February 4, 2015, charted on the Oricon Singles Chart for 44 weeks and topped at No. 6 on February 16.

Hayate Hisakawa (久川 颯, Hisakawa Hayate)
Voiced by: Rika Nagae
The younger twin sister of Nagi.

Karen Hojo (北条 加蓮, Hōjō Karen)
Voiced by: Mai Fuchigami
A frail girl who dresses herself as a gyaru to help cope with the depression resulting from a strange childhood sickness that she keeps secret from most people. In the anime, she has known Rin and Nao since middle school, and they eventually reunited at 346 Production. The three later formed an idol unit named "Triad Primus".
Her Cinderella Master single, released on April 30, 2014, charted on the Oricon Singles Chart for seven weeks and topped at No. 5 on May 12.

Haruna Kamijo (上条 春菜, Kamijō Haruna)
Voiced by: Mina Nagashima
An ordinary-looking girl who adores cats and glasses so often, that she have a tendency to being distraught when thinking of contact lenses due to her confidence of having her first pair in the past. She also nervous of not wearing any of her glass during her audition, so the Producer regained her confidence by building the concept suitable to her, forming her desire to break away the stereotype of glass-wearers, even asked the fellow idols to wear them despite their refusal.

Nao Kamiya (神谷 奈緒, Kamiya Nao)
Voiced by: Eriko Matsui
A high school freshman who loves watching anime, but suddenly decided to become an idol so she can wear girly clothes. In the anime, she has known Rin and Karen since middle school, and they eventually reunited at 346 Production. The three later formed an idol unit named "Triad Primus".
Her Cinderella Master single, released on April 30, 2014, charted on the Oricon Singles Chart for 20 weeks and topped at No. 7 on May 12.
She was one of the five idols who appeared in the November 2019 "Spin-off!" short.

Ranko Kanzaki (神崎 蘭子, Kanzaki Ranko)
Please refer to the Cinderella Project section

Mizuki Kawashima (川島 瑞樹, Kawashima Mizuki)
Voiced by: Nao Tōyama
A former news anchor who pursue the idol path to express her own talent, and also aware of her mature age in order to nurture her own appearance, acting as a role model to other idols, even helping the Producer to clean up the office. Despite her old age made people concern about her own life, she's also a hard worker and often competing with younger colleagues to keep her feel younger, often made her staff getting frustrated because of her mishaps.
Her Cinderella Master single, released on January 23, 2013, charted on the Oricon Singles Chart for five weeks and topped at No. 8 on February 4.

Tsukasa Kiryu (桐生つかさ, Kiryu Tsukasa)
Voiced by: Maki Kawase
A successful CEO from a national company in Fukui Prefecture who simply wanted to pursue her own singing career, even have her interest of gyaru-inspired fashion. She also owned a fashion marketing company, which the Producer is able to scout her during an event by surprise, due to her career potential that linked to her business growth. Later, she admits that her idol career is took longer than she expected compared to her business peers, and need to trust him in order to advance during that.

Layla (ライラ, Raira)
Voiced by: Kana Ichinose
A foreigner from Dubai who often peek people's conversations in parks, often struggles with Japanese customs and cautious of her finance and food. It was later turns out that she escaped from a forced marriage by her family maids which she keep it as a secret with her mother.
Ryo Matsunaga (松永 涼, Matsunaga Ryō)
Voiced by: Haruka Chisuga
A vocalist of an unknown band who being scouted by the Producer during their performance, which she initially skeptical but was being motivated by her fellow bandmates to find herself in a big stage. During her time as an idol, she slowly opened her mind to the Producer about her potential, and realizing the difficulty of the idol space, so she rooted for her transformation for the pride of her bandmates. She was previously being stuck in her princess image, with the only interest is classical music and jazz, which she was unable to express herself, forcing her to join the band to break away her past.

Miyu Mifune (三船 美優, Mifune Miyu)
Voiced by: Sayaka Harada
A shy former office worker who has a crush on the Producer on Christmas Eve due to his kind actions to her, even implied him as part of her family. She has trouble enjoying herself due to the loss of her own dog, but was able to find herself after being motivated to become an idol by her choice, even acted as a mother figure to younger idols.

Hijiri Mochizuki (望月 聖, Mochiduki Hiziri)
Voiced by: Suzuko Hara
A shy, soft spoken young girl who enjoys winter holidays, especially during snowy night times. Her exceptional soprano singing voice caught the Producer to scout her during a winter night, which she initially being nervous due to her introverted nature, but after the Producer promise her to spread her song to everyone, she slowly opens herself in order to keep her promise alive. She also used to work in a church's choir, and have interest of classical music instruments such as piano and organ.

Nono Morikubo (森久保 乃々, Morikubo Nono)
Voiced by: Karin Takahashi
An uneasy 14-year-old who always doubts about her idol potential, even always thinking about giving up, but she was advised by the Producer to find her strength in order to continue her career. She fonds of writing poetry and aspires to became a picture book author. Due to her fearful behavior, she often anxious during performances, often hides in under tables or closets, even afraid of making close friends, but later, she was able to became best friends with Syoko and Mirei.

Asuka Ninomiya (二宮 飛鳥, Ninomiya Asuka)
Voiced by: Shiki Aoki
A young, cool chuunibyou who has an intricate dark speaking manner and often wearing grunge and buckle fashion during her idol life. Although she asked the Producer to cut some slack due to her puberty, but she thinks that she can convey her feelings despite her absence of the ability itself. She also very skeptical of her own perspective to everything that she sees, especially paranormal things, this later put her to befriending Ranko due to their similarity.
Her Cinderella Master single, released on March 2, 2016, charted on the Oricon Singles Chart for 39 weeks and topped at No. 7 on March 14.

Minami Nitta (新田 美波, Nitta Minami)
Please refer to the Cinderella Project section

Izumi Ōishi (大石 泉, Ōishi Izumi)
Voiced by: Saeko Ōki
An intelligent and honest student who handles information analysis for her fellow classmates under their own unit New Wave, despite her inability to express her own feelings and lacks of confidence. She's also a devoted hard worker who helped other idols in hand, often took some rest in green fields and asked for some help by others when she haven't any familiarity on some occasions. She also have a little brother who's a patient in a hospital, that she visit often as her motivation of being an idol.

Fumika Sagisawa (鷺沢 文香, Sagisawa Fumika)
Voiced by: M.A.O
An university student who works part-time at her uncle's bookstore, and having immense knowledge about different varieties of books, and tends to having a long tangent when trying to teach her fellow idols, but having difficulties in social conversations due to lack of outside life experience. Driven by her desire to become a better person, she slowly open her life to befriends colleagues and experience new things that she haven't seen before.
Her Cinderella Master single, released on February 4, 2015, charted on the Oricon Singles Chart for five weeks and topped at No. 4 on February 16.

Yukimi Sajo (佐城 雪美, Sajo Yukimi)
Voiced by: Mina Nakazawa
A mysterious girl who has a slow, broken speech pattern with many ellipses, often wanted to impress the Producer in a creepy manner. It was later turns out that she often bring her cat Pero in order to improve her social skills, and dedicated to every role she was assign for.
She is one of the central characters in the spin-off manga U149.

Chie Sasaki (佐々木 千枝, Sasaki Chie)
Please refer to the Third Entertainment Division section

Rin Shibuya (渋谷 凛, Shibuya Rin)
Please refer to the Cinderella Project section

Syuko Shiomi (塩見 周子, Shiomi Shūko)
Voiced by: Ru Thing
An idol who worked as a waitress after being kicked out of her parents' wagashiya. She is a blood donor. In the anime, she is a member of "Project:Krone" and also makes a cameo appearance in Episode 25 with Kako and Sae.
Her Cinderella Master single, released on November 18, 2015, charted on the Oricon Singles Chart for 19 weeks and topped at No. 13 on November 30.

Koume Shirasaka (白坂 小梅, Shirasaka Koume)
Voiced by: Chiyo Ousaki
A young girl who have interest in Gothic culture and horror genre, often scared fellow idols and having cheerful disposition to horror things. She's also an introvert and have trouble of normal conversations, but after her mom tricked her to an audition, she later made friends with Syoko, which both shared their horror hobbies.

Akira Sunazuka (砂塚あきら, Sunazuka Akira)
Voiced by: Miyu Tomita
A female streamer who came from Niigata Prefecture for her idol career beyond her fashion showcases on her SNS account. Although she's independent and having direct talking manner to everyone, but she choose to live with her family at her hometown, and slowly open her softer side during her interactions with other idols.
Her Cinderella Master single, released on November 13, 2013, charted on the Oricon Singles Chart for six weeks and topped at No. 12 on November 25.

Arisu Tachibana (橘 ありす, Tachibana Arisu)
Please refer to the Third Entertainment Division section

Riina Tada (多田 李衣菜, Tada Riina)
Please refer to the Cinderella Project section

Kako Takafuji (鷹富士 茄子, Takafuji Kako)
Voiced by: Rana Morishita
A modest and knowledgeable girl who enjoys traditional Japanese New Year and having incredible luck to people around her, even though she's bad at telling jokes.

Kaede Takagaki (高垣 楓, Takagaki Kaede)
Voiced by: Saori Hayami
An elegant veteran idol with a taste for wordplays and alcoholic drinks. In the anime, she is depicted as a veteran idol for 346 Production.
Her Cinderella Master single, released on April 18, 2012, charted on the Oricon Singles Chart for fourteen weeks and topped at No. 7 on April 30.

Tamami Wakiyama (脇山 珠美, Wakiyama Tamami)
Voiced by: Misa Kayama
A young Kendo practitioner who has strong sense of justice, being helpful and responsible to fellow idols and the Producer, who helped her during a fight with a gang of delinquents, leading to her being scouted. Despite she isn't fond of ghosts, she still maintain her determination to rise victorious, even if she was disappointed when she thinks she wasn't made enough effort. She also having a soft spot when the Producer praised her of being adult-like, cute or being a hero.

Makino Yagami (八神 マキノ, Yagami Makino)
Voiced by: Yui Ninomiya
A mysterious skilled hacker who collects secret data about 346 Production idols. It is unknown who she works for or why she became an idol in the first place, though her introduction suggests that she doesn't like the idea of being an idol.

Aki Yamato (大和 亜季, Yamato Aki)
Voiced by: Tomo Muranaka
An upbeat muscle girl who has immense interest of military weapons, tactics and transportations, also have sharp shooting skills and immense knowledge of wilderness survival. She's also overexcited during airsoft competitions and FPS game matches, even though her military know-how affect her conversation skills in some occasions.

Haru Yūki (結城 晴, Yūki Haru)
Please refer to the Third Entertainment Division section

=== Passion idols ===
Yumi Aiba (相葉 夕美, Aiba Yumi)
Voiced by: Juri Kimura
Her Cinderella Master single, released on March 2, 2016, charted on the Oricon Singles Chart for nine weeks and topped at No. 10 on March 14.

Miria Akagi (赤城 みりあ, Akagi Miria)
Please refer to the Cinderella Project section

Eve Santa Claus (イヴ・サンタクロース, Eve Santa Claus)
Voiced by: Akane Matsunaga

Ayame Hamaguchi (浜口 あやめ, Hamaguchi Ayame)
Voiced by: Masumi Tazawa

Yuki Himekawa (姫川 友紀, Himekawa Yuki)
Voiced by: Mako Morino
Her Cinderella Master single, released on February 4, 2015, charted on the Oricon Singles Chart for five weeks and topped at No. 6 on February 16.

Akane Hino (日野 茜, Hino Akane)
Voiced by: Chinatsu Akasaki
An energetic and silly girl who have interest in rugby, with her favorite drink is tea, even she often confused it as a food when she get overexcited. Despite her silliness, she wanted to pursue her goal as an top idol with much effort as possible.
Her Cinderella Master single, released on May 22, 2013, charted on the Oricon Singles Chart for five weeks and topped at No. 12 on June 3.

Nagi Hisakawa (久川 凪, Hisakawa Nagi)
Voiced by: Hina Tachibana
The older twin sister of Hayate.

Mio Honda (本田 未央, Honda Mio)
Please refer to the Cinderella Project section

Yuko Hori (堀 裕子, Hori Yūko)
Voiced by: Eri Suzuki
A 16 year-old young girl who believes that she is psychic, despite being completely ordinary. She applied to an idol audition due to a premonition of seeing herself on stage. While she may not be able to perform the psychic acts she says she can, she remains confident in the belief she will be able to someday. She is part of the unit "Sexy Guilty" along Sanae Katagiri and Shizuku Oikawa. Her Cinderella Master single, released on April 30, 2014, charted on the Oricon Singles Chart for four weeks and topped at No. 12 on May 12.

Syoko Hoshi (星 輝子, Hoshi Shōko)
Voiced by: Satsumi Matsuda
An introvertive awkward girl who has interest of mushrooms and have trouble of normal conversations, but after the Producer coerced her to join the audition, she developed an unusual erratic death metal behavior, possibly of her overconsumption of mushrooms.
Her Cinderella Master single, released on April 30, 2014, charted on the Oricon Singles Chart for five weeks and topped at No. 8 on May 12.

Nina Ichihara (市原 仁奈, Ichihara Nina)
Please refer to the Third Entertainment Division section

Mika Jōgasaki (城ヶ崎 美嘉, Jōgasaki Mika)
Voiced by: Haruka Yoshimura
Rika's older sister. In the anime, she is a member of the idol unit Happy Princess.
Her Cinderella Master single, released on August 8, 2012, charted on the Oricon Singles Chart for nine weeks and topped at No. 13 on August 20.

Rika Jōgasaki (城ヶ崎 莉嘉, Jōgasaki Rika)
Please refer to the Cinderella Project section

Sanae Katagiri (片桐 早苗, Katagiri Sanae)
Voiced by: Azumi Waki
A 28-year-old former police officer who quit the force to become an idol. She sees herself as an older sister to her fellow idols, as almost all of them are younger than her. Sanae is part of the unit "Sexy Guilty" along Yuko Hori and Shizuku Oikawa. Her Cinderella Master single, released on November 18, 2015, charted on the Oricon Singles Chart for 11 weeks and topped at No. 14 on November 30.

Natsuki Kimura (木村 夏樹, Kimura Natsuki)
Voiced by: Kiyono Yasuno
A skilled guitarist who aimed to became a rocker, after her audition put her in the idol division by mistake, later made friends with Riina due to their shared dream of became a rocker. She refused to show her weakness publicly, even challenging herself to trying different concepts, and interested of riding bikes, sometimes involves in silly arguments and pranks with other idols.

Hinako Kita (喜多 日菜子, Kita Hinako)
Voiced by: Seria Fukagawa
A delusional idol who does a lot of daydreaming and has her head in the clouds. She wants to be a real-life Cinderella and thinks that the Prince Charming will arrive.

Yuzu Kitami (喜多見 柚, Kitami Yuzu)
Voiced by: Larissa Tago Takeda

Reina Koseki (小関 麗奈, Koseki Reina)
Voiced by: Yuki Nagano

Risa Matoba (的場 梨沙, Matoba Risa)
Please refer to the Third Entertainment Division section

Kirari Moroboshi (諸星 きらり, Moroboshi Kirari)
Please refer to the Cinderella Project section

Takumi Mukai (向井 拓海, Mukai Takumi)
Voiced by: Yuko Hara
A rough, rude former sukeban, Takumi left her old life as a gang leader to become an idol, wanting to be a good influence on younger girls. Although she has a soft spot for cute things, she ironically hates wearing cute, girly outfits.
She is the main character in the spin-off manga WILD WIND GIRL.

Tomoe Murakami (村上 巴, Murakami Tomoe)
Voiced by: Miharu Hanai

Emi Namba (難波 笑美, Nanba Emi)
Voiced by: Arisa Date

Hikaru Nanjo (南条 光, Nanjō Hikaru)
Voiced by: Sayaka Kamitani

Natalia (ナターリア, Natāria)
Voiced by: Teru Ikuta
A young Brazilian foreigner from Rio who have interest in Japanese culture who is the daughter of a famous Brazilian soccer player, although she have difficulties speaking the language fluently and sometimes naive. She also interested in Arabian dance and wanted to learn more about the country during her idol career.

Yui Ohtsuki (大槻 唯, Ōtsuki Yui)
Voiced by: Nanami Yamashita
An excitable and laid-back girl who often tease the Producer by her hobby of eating candy as her kind of indirect kisses. She also able to feel the rhythm of her own drum, and love the freedom of some roles, specifically a pirate.
Her Cinderella Master single, released on March 2, 2016, charted on the Oricon Singles Chart for 35 weeks and topped at No. 8 on March 14.

Shizuku Oikawa (及川 雫, Oikawa Shizuku)
Voiced by: Yuri Noguchi
A sixteen-year-old idol raised on a dairy farm in Iwate, Shizuku loves cows and some of her stage costumes are inspired by them. She is also known for having the largest bust size of all idols in the entire Idolmaster franchise. Shizuku is part of the unit "Sexy Guilty" along fellow idols Yuko Hori and Sanae Katagiri.

Kaoru Ryuzaki (龍崎 薫, Ryūzaki Kaoru)
Please refer to the Third Entertainment Division section

Shin Sato (佐藤 心, Satō Shin)
Voiced by: Yumiri Hanamori
She was one of the five idols who appeared in the November 2019 "Spin-off!" short.

Aiko Takamori (高森 藍子, Takamori Aiko)
Voiced by: Yūki Kaneko
Her Cinderella Master single, released on November 13, 2013, charted on the Oricon Singles Chart for six weeks and topped at No. 13 on November 25.

Airi Totoki (十時 愛梨, Totoki Airi)
Voiced by: Hitomi Harada
A soft, airheaded girl who often forget everything and need relying to others to remember her things, but being generous, genuine and open minded to everyone. Her hobby is baking and eating sweets, often bring her home-made or store bought sweets to the office. She tends to feel uneasy at warm temperatures, and often felt sad when she was unintentionally dragged down to reality or being helped by everyone, this put her in a tendency to be more mature and independent. She wanted to became a top idol in order to help the Producer rise to the top, but often being dwarfed by her airhead behavior.
Her Cinderella Master single, released on January 23, 2013, charted on the Oricon Singles Chart for five weeks and topped at No. 5 on February 4.

Suzuho Ueda (上田 鈴帆, Ueda Suzuho)
Voiced by: Nanami Haruno

Yoshino Yorita (依田 芳乃, Yorita Yoshino)
Voiced by: Yūki Takada
A pure, straightforward and honest teenager from Kagoshima Prefecture who often helping others along her way, having extraordinary senses to find items, sensing people and reading thoughts. She's often visiting shrines and sometimes dancing on top of the roof during religious festival. It was assumed that she's is an supernatural deity Benzaiten that the Producer unknowingly wasted his wish before, if not, a miko.

Riamu Yumemi (夢見 りあむ, Yumemi Riamu)
Voiced by: Seena Hoshiki

== 315 Production ==
The talent agency where the main cast of The Idolmaster SideM works. There are 49 idols in 315 Pro as of Growing Stars, and they are all male idols, as opposed to other talent agencies in the game series which have only female ones. The idols here are grouped into sixteen units and categorized into three archetypes: Physical, Intelligent, and Mental.

All 315 Pro idols appear in the SideM games and in the SideM Mini anime.

=== 315 STARS ===
315 STARS is a collective unit consisting of the 19 members of the six units focused on in the SideM anime adaptation: Jupiter, DRAMATIC STARS, Beit, S.E.M, High×Joker, and W.

==== DRAMATIC STARS ====
The main unit of the SideM subseries, DRAMATIC STARS takes its name from the three unit members' vastly different backgrounds and the dramatic backstories that they each experience.

Teru Tendo (天道 輝, Tendo Teru)
Voiced by: Shugo Nakamura
Attribute type: Physical
A 28-year-old former lawyer, Teru is athletic, cheerful and kind, and has a strong sense of justice, having dreamed of becoming a superhero. After being fired from his job as a lawyer, he got called about becoming an idol, met both Kaoru and Tsubasa via the Producer at a bar while being drunk and went to the auditions. He loves tokusatsu special effects, being a fan of the genre, and enjoys playing darts.

Kaoru Sakuraba (桜庭 薫, Sakuraba Kaoru)
Voiced by: Yuma Uchida
Attribute type: Intelligent
A 26-year-old former doctor, Kaoru is known to be a perfectionist. He acts condescendingly and is rude towards his fellow idols, especially Teru, whom he describes as a dumb person. He aspired to become a doctor out of his tragic past – his older sister, whom he loved for her brilliant singing, died from an incurable disease. Heartbroken over her death, Kaoru wears his sister's dolphin pendant, and reads her poetry book which he keeps as a memento. He is skilled in magic tricks and ventriloquism.

Tsubasa Kashiwagi (柏木 翼, Kashiwagi Tsubasa)
Voiced by: Taku Yashiro
Attribute type: Mental
A 24-year-old former pilot, Tsubasa lost his job as a result of messing up his first flight. He went to a concert of Jupiter with the Producer, who asked whether he also wanted to become an idol. However, when he took on a new career as an idol, he feared ruining it as he did with his previous pilot career, but after a talk with Teru, he realizes that he must continue going after what he wants. He is aware of his large build and can eat an entire meal in 5 minutes. He has spoken in an interview about taking another job as a gourmet reporter in the future, and hints on co-hosting a cooking show with Teru. He has two younger siblings, is quiet, and hates wasabi.

==== Jupiter ====
An all-male idol group introduced in The Idolmaster 2. Originally produced by 961 Production, Jupiter was created by Kuroi as an idol unit to counter 765 Pro's rise in popularity. In the anime, they are an established and popular idol unit. As of Episode 21 of the anime, they left 961 Pro to start on their own after acknowledging what Kuroi was up to with his dirty tactics. As of The Idolmaster SideM, Jupiter has joined 315 Production.

Tōma Amagase (天ヶ瀬 冬馬, Amagase Tōma)
Voiced by: Takuma Terashima
Attribute type: Physical
Tōma is one of the idols introduced in The Idolmaster 2. The de facto leader of Jupiter, he is a year younger than Takane. Described as a hot-blooded young man, he is very competitive and takes his job as an idol seriously, but also wishes to compete against anyone fair and square. While he easily gets pissed off when teased, he is surprisingly polite when speaking. Tōma enjoys playing soccer and collecting figures from his favorite mecha anime, and is in fact skilled at cooking.
The Idolmaster 2 hints at a potential relationship between him and Haruka.
In The Idolmaster anime, Tōma is shown to be at odds with Kuroi, despite working for 961 Production. He frequently scolds Kuroi for the latter's business practices, which he deems unethical. This, in turn, becomes the reason why Tōma sympathizes with Chihaya upon finding out the defamatory magazine article about her past.

Hokuto Ijūin (伊集院 北斗, Ijūin Hokuto)
Voiced by: Daichi Kanbara
Attribute type: Intelligent
Hokuto is one of the idols introduced in The Idolmaster 2. He is a year younger than Azusa, making him the oldest member of Jupiter. A well-known ladies' man, he is gifted with a charming appeal and likes to flirt with young girls. As the oldest member of Jupiter, Hokuto also handles public relations for the group. According to his backstory in SideM, Hokuto was originally a piano prodigy and aimed to become a pianist, but an injury caused him to be unable to play piano again.
The Idolmaster 2 hints at a potential relationship between him and Makoto.

Shōta Mitarai (御手洗 翔太, Mitarai Shōta)
Voiced by: Yoshitsugu Matsuoka
Attribute type: Mental
Shōta is one of the idols introduced in The Idolmaster 2. He is the youngest member of Jupiter, a year younger than Iori. In contrast to fellow members of Jupiter, he is a laid-back boy who would rather take things easy. Despite this, and his innocent looks, Shōta is actually quite energetic and really loves to pull pranks on anyone, especially Tōma. His only known hobbies are napping and filial piety.
The Idolmaster 2 hints at a potential relationship between him and Yayoi.

==== Beit ====
An idol unit with a prince theme. As their unit name suggests, each member of this unit was originally a part-timer.

Pierre (ピエール, Piēru)
Voiced by: Shun Horie
Attribute type: Mental
Pierre is an innocent and optimistic European prince, probably from Belgium or Luxembourg. He currently lives in Japan and works as a mascot at an amusement park, handing out balloons in a frog suit. He was scouted by the Producer during his regular shift to become an idol. His love for making people smile led to a decision to accept that offer, and soon he formed a unit with Kyōji and Minori. Concepts such as autographs, kidnapping, and Japanese customs in general have to be explained to him, and his Japanese is terrible. Pierre came to Japan as a result of a throne dispute between his two older brothers when their father fell ill, making it unsafe for him to stay in his fatherland any longer. He is often seen in his frog mascot suit, and is surprisingly good at peeling mandarin oranges. His full name is revealed to be Pierre Bichelberger (ピエール·ビシェルバーガー, Piēru Bisherubāgā).

Minori Watanabe (渡辺 みのり, Watanabe Minori)
Voiced by: Tomohito Takatsuka
Attribute type: Physical
A former flower shop clerk, Minori has admired idols, notably Jupiter, for as long as he can remember, to the point where he collects all DVDs of live idol performances. Despite his calm and friendly nature, he was once a delinquent, as evidenced by his past as a gang member, which explains why he is prone to threatening or scolding someone, although in a refined manner. He compares other people to flowers when talking about them. He is also skilled at sewing and cooking. Since he is often seen doting on Pierre so much, he is considered the leader of his own unit. As an aficionado of idols, Minori understands what other fans want and, because of this, he habitually takes pictures with Kyōji and Pierre on his smartphone and emphasizes the importance of his unit's costumes. Before performing, he looks at flower stands sent to the agency by fans and praises his fellow teammates whenever they do a successful job; he is also protective of them. As shown in an in-game event, he enjoys barbecuing and riding motorcycles.

Kyōji Takajo (鷹城 恭二, Takajo Kyōji)
Voiced by: Yūichirō Umehara
Attribute type: Intelligent
A former convenience store clerk, Kyōji became an idol to start from scratch at Pierre's advice after moving out of his family's house following arguments with his father and older brother over his college entrance exam grades. He is not good with speaking in a manner that is not harsher than intended to be, and has admitted to holding a grudge against rich people. Despite this, he has good intentions and loves his fellow teammates. He is also not good at smiling or television appearances, and manages to achieve a more natural smile by thinking about his fans' support when made to improve his stage presence and fanservice ability on one occasion. However, he has a poor relationship with his family, except his younger brother. Kyōji can perform mathematical calculations in his mind and do housework himself, especially laundry.

==== S.E.M. ====
An idol unit consisting of three former high school teachers. The name of their unit stands for Science, English, and Mathematics.

Michio Hazama (硲 道夫, Hazama Michio)
Voiced by: Kent Itō
Attribute type: Intelligent
Michio is a former math teacher with a serious and analytical personality. He became an idol with the purpose of not being trumped by a quirky costume; though over time, he has come to accept his idol duties fully and with great zeal from his costumes to acting roles and other assigned work. He incorporates mathematical references in his dialogue and can tackle any problem from a logical viewpoint, often organizing his ideas on white boards and drawing up graphs and other mathematical representations to aid him in coming to a solution or in presenting his ideas.

Rui Maida (舞田 類, Maida Rui)
Voiced by: Junya Enoki
Attribute type: Mental
Rui is an upbeat and fun-loving former English teacher who never lets things put him down. Because of this background, he has a habit of slipping English words in his speech. Believing that he could become a world star with his fluency in English, he has always wanted to become an idol, thinking it would be much more exciting to be one. In fact, his motivation kicked off when he happened to see his best friend since university, Hokuto Ijūin, perform at his school's cultural festival. Fittingly for his personality, Rui is very much into extreme sports, namely skiing, snowboarding, and surfing.

Jirō Yamashita (山下 次郎, Yamashita Jirō)
Voiced by: Yoshiki Nakajima
Attribute type: Intelligent
A miserly former chemistry teacher, Jirō is very lax about his job and is quite a slacker, in contrast to his colleague, Michio Kazama. Whenever no one was looking, he would use the school's lab equipments to brew himself coffee, only to get himself reprimanded by Michio for that. He decided to become an idol because he had heard of Michio talking to himself about becoming an idol. While at first skeptical of the idea, in part because he will miss his old days as a teacher, Jirō ended up joining Michio and Rui to become idols once he learned of how much money they could make.

==== High×Joker ====
An idol unit formed out of a high school light music club. In the anime, they were scouted by the Producer after watching one of their performances.

Shiki Iseya (伊瀬谷 四季, Iseya Shiki)
Voiced by: Shō Nogami
Attribute type: Physical
The lead vocalist of the unit, Shiki is a high school boy who loves his friends at the light music club. He is not the best student at school, as he gets poor test scores. In fact, there is nothing he's good at other than singing. Unwilling to see his friends go their separate ways after graduating, Shiki came up with the idea of having the five debut as an idol unit, so as to be able to stay together.

Hayato Akiyama (秋山 隼人, Akiyama Hayato)
Voiced by: Shōya Chiba
Attribute type: Physical
The guitarist of the unit, Hayato is an energetic and friendly young boy who's desperate to break himself free from his 'average guy' image. He was the one who founded the light music club, and he remains its leader. As a result, Hayato has a strong sense of responsibility for his club members. He is always ready to help out his club members whenever they're having trouble.

Haruna Wakazato (若里 春名, Wakazato Haruna)
Voiced by: Yusuke Shirai
Attribute type: Mental
The drummer of the unit, Haruna is a hard-working boy who never stops doing anything he can to make a living for himself and his mother. Because of this, he has been held in school twice, and in order to improve his academic performance, he decided to join the light music club. His poor grades aside, Haruna is fluent in English and is really good at hairdoing and make-up. His favorite food is donuts.

Jun Fuyumi (冬美 旬, Fuyumi Jun)
Voiced by: Takuma Nagatsuka
Attribute type: Intelligent
The keyboardist of the unit, Jun is a studious and no-nonsense young boy with a great passion for music. Despite being a piano prodigy, he plays keyboard to better fit the light music club's pop/rock image, though he insists that the piano and the keyboard are not the same thing. Considered an honor student at his school, he is more focused on upcoming exams than the other members of the club, and has to be the one to look after them, especially Shiki and Haruna, just to study together. Before joining the light music club, Jun was quite hesitant to try something new, including being an idol. But he felt that he had no choice but to do it so he could help out his childhood friend, Natsumi Sakaki.

Natsumi Sakaki (榊 夏来, Sakaki Natsumi)
Voiced by: Hiroshi Watanabe
Attribute type: Intelligent
The bassist of the unit, Natsumi has been friends with Jun Fuyumi since childhood. In fact, he has been emotionally attached to Jun, thinking of him as his only friend. Natsumi is incredibly shy and rarely speaks, often relying on Jun to help him meet strangers more properly. He doesn't even care that he is popular for his good looks, preferring to be a supporter of his friends. He joined the light music club only because Jun showed an interest in doing so.

==== W ====
An idol unit composed of twins, similar to the Futami twins. They were originally professional footballers. Because of this, they have soccer motif in their attire, and they refer to the Producer as if he is their coach.

Kyōsuke Aoi (蒼井 享介, Aoi Kyōsuke)
Voiced by: Yoshitaka Yamaya
Attribute type: Intelligent
The responsible younger twin, Kyōsuke is a hardworking and reliable young man who takes whatever he does seriously, sometimes to the point of worry and doubt. He is also the one who looks after his brother, even blaming himself for his brother's career-ending injury. Kyōsuke was at first hesitant about his new life as an idol, but as time passes, he learns to put a trust in others and befriend them.

Yūsuke Aoi (蒼井 悠介, Aoi Yūsuke)
Voiced by: Takeru Kikuchi
Attribute type: Mental
The energetic older twin, Yūsuke is a carefree and playful young man who's bad at learning anything, even forgetting the details, but remains optimistic all the time. He sustained a serious knee injury during a match, forcing him to retire early. While recovering in the hospital, Yūsuke started taking an interest in becoming an idol, and asked Kyōsuke to become one too, so they could continue playing as the ultimate team together.

=== Altessimo ===
An idol unit themed around classical music.

Rei Kagura (神楽 麗, Kagura Rei)
Voiced by: Yūsuke Nagano
Attribute type: Intelligent

Kei Tsuzuki (都築 圭, Tsuzuki Kei)
Voiced by: Shun'ichi Toki
Attribute type: Mental

=== FRAME ===
An idol unit with an emergency service theme.

Hideo Akuno (握野 英雄, Akuno Hideo)
Voiced by: Kentarō Kumagai
Attribute type: Intelligent
Hideo is a former policeman unfortunately born with a frightening facial appearance and sharp teeth. Because of this, he is often mistaken for a thug instead of a police officer, but in reality, he's got a good heart. In order to clear up all misunderstanding about him, Hideo decided retire from the police force and become an idol. During his time as a policeman, Hideo also worked as a dog trainer for the force. He also owns a pet dog said to be as scary as himself, and his favorite food is hotcakes, especially ones topped with syrup. It is revealed that his entire family also has the same sharp teeth trait as him.

Ryū Kimura (木村 龍, Kimura Ryū)
Voiced by: Kento Hama
Attribute type: Physical
Despite being clumsy and always having a streak of misfortunes throughout his life, Ryū is an optimistic young man who always tries to look on the bright side no matter what trouble he gets into. He once wanted to be the best fireman in town, but soon realized the job was not the best career choice for him. Ryū lost his job after he was accused of committing an intentional assault – he accidentally tripped and knocked over a stranger at a crowd of spectators during an idol concert. However, he saw his luck turn around upon learning from the idol who was performing at the concert that the man he knocked over was in fact her stalker. This, in turn, convinced Ryū to become an idol himself.

Seiji Shingen (信玄 誠司, Shingen Seiji)
Voiced by: Takuya Masumoto
Attribute type: Mental
One of the largest characters among the cast of SideM and the Idolmaster franchise – he was in fact the tallest idol in the entire franchise before Amehiko Kuzunoha was introduced – Shingen serves as the father figure to fellow members of the unit, and is very protective of them. Despite this, he is somewhat nervous around women, though he does care for his young niece Amane, treating her as if she is his daughter. Before becoming an idol, he was originally a Japan Self-Defense Force trooper. One of the few known things about his past is that he lost a close friend of his while on duty. In honor of his fallen friend, he dons the friend's dogtags whenever he is in casual attire. Eager to put the tragedy beleaguering his time as a soldier behind him, Shingen resigned from the force and took a more lighthearted job, so as to make his niece happy.

=== Sai ===
An idol unit apparently themed around traditional Japanese culture. Stylized as "Sai" (彩).

Kirio Nekoyanagi (猫柳 キリオ, Nekoyanagi Kirio)
Voiced by: Daiki Yamashita
Attribute type: Intelligent

Kurō Kiyosumi (清澄 九郎, Kiyosumi Kurō)
Voiced by: Yūya Nakada
Attribute type: Mental

Shōma Hanamura (華村 翔真, Hanamura Shōma)
Voiced by: Yutaka Balletta
Attribute type: Mental

=== Shinsoku Ikkon ===
An idol unit composed of two former high school delinquents. Stylized as "Shinsoku Ikkon" (神速一魂) (lit. 'Godspeed One Soul'), they seem to be themed around the creatures in Chinese mythology, in particular the Four Symbols.

Suzaku Akai (紅井 朱雀, Akai Suzaku)
Voiced by: Takeaki Masuyama
Attribute type: Physical

Genbu Kurono (黒野 玄武, Kurono Genbu)
Voiced by: Toshinari Fukamachi
Attribute type: Intelligent

=== Café Parade ===
An idol unit consisting of the staff members of the café of the same name. In order to save their café from going out of business, they auditioned to become idols.

Yukihiro Kamiya (神谷 幸広, Kamiya Yukihiro)
Voiced by: Shō Karino
Attribute type: Mental
Yukihiro is the owner of Café Parade who's very kind to his employees and customers. Living by the motto "one good deed a day", he always does as hard as he can to make people happy. But more often than not, Yukihiro is absent-minded and tends to get lost whenever he is travelling, having to rely on fellow unit members to get him straight. He is also easily frightened by scary things. According to his backstory, Yukihiro had a troubled childhood, where he hardly ever got to see his workaholic parents, leading him to run away from home upon graduating from high school so he could travel around the world himself. One particular incident during his travel convinced him to open Café Parade once he returned to Japan. When the café found itself struggling to stay afloat, Yukihiro invited his employees to become idols, believing they could bring happiness together that way.

Sōichirō Shinonome (東雲 荘一郎, Shinonome Sōichirō)
Voiced by: Kōhei Amasaki
Attribute type: Intelligent
The straight man of the unit, Sōichirō is the pastry chef of Café Parade. He speaks politely and is thankful toward customers, though people tend to find him terrifying when he is angry. It is unknown why his eyes are always shut, but Sōichirō was born to a family of wagashi makers, and lost his right to inherit his family's wagashiya due to his inability to look at, much less eat anko. Sōichirō is best friends with Yukihiro Kamiya since middle school, but can't stand his airheadedness and terrible sense of direction. Even then, Sōichirō is glad that he was able to reunite with Yukihiro as the two went on to open Café Parade.

Asselin BB II (アスラン=BB II世, Asuran Beruzebyūto Nisei)
Voiced by: Makoto Furukawa
Attribute type: Physical
Asselin describes himself as the manservant of the Demon Lord Satan, coming to the mortal world as an alchemist to learn the ways of the mortals. In reality, he is the 26-year-old head chef of Café Parade with an absurd sense of imagination. Before he started working at Café Parade, Asselin was an award-winning chef who was struggling to find and keep a job at various restaurants because of his 'demonic' eccentricity. Asselin is always seen carrying a stuffed toy, which he names Satan, on his shoulder. In fact, he has been imagining himself as a demon to make up for his shyness and social ineptitude.

Saki Mizushima (水嶋 咲, Mizushima Saki)
Voiced by: Daiki Kobayashi
Attribute type: Physical
A lover of all cute stuff, Saki works at Café Parade as a waiter, dressed in a maid dress. He is actually a boy, but seems to enjoy getting dressed in girl's clothes. In fact, he was inspired by a particular 876 Pro idol who was indeed a crossdressing idol back then. Saki believes that he could discover his true self by crossdressing. However, Saki has to keep his job as a waiter and an idol a secret from his classmates and family, as all of this could put him in trouble, especially with his strict father. He is best friends with Makio Uzuki, whom he affectionately addresses as "Roll".

Makio Uzuki (卯月 巻緒, Uzuki Makio)
Voiced by: Takuya Kodama
Attribute type: Mental
Makio is a waiter at Café Parade with a sweet tooth. He has a great love for cakes, mainly because when he was young, his mother would make some cakes for him. In fact, he applied for a job at Café Parade mainly for the desire to get the taste of their cakes. Ever since then though, Makio takes his job seriously and becomes determined to keep the café running. When Yukihiro came up with the idea of auditioning together to become idols for 315 Pro, Makio eagerly accepted.

=== Mofumofuen ===
An idol unit composed entirely of young boys under the age of 12. Stylized as "Mofumofuen" (もふもふえん, Mofumofuen), this unit is unique in that its members are the youngest of the entire cast.

Kanon Himeno (姫野 かのん, Himeno Kanon)
Voiced by: Ayumu Murase(2016-2026), Kōki Inō(2026-present)
Attribute type: Mental

Nao Okamura (岡村 直央, Okamura Nao)
Voiced by: Shōgo Yano
Attribute type: Intelligent

Shirō Tachibana (橘 志狼, Tachibana Shirō)
Voiced by: Keisuke Furuhata
Attribute type: Physical

=== The Kogadō ===
An idol unit with a martial arts theme, as evidenced by its members' martial arts background. Stylized as "The Kogadō" (THE 虎牙道, Za Kogadō), the members of this unit share the Physical archetype, unlike most other units.

Michiru Enjōji (円城寺 道流, Enjōji Michiru)
Voiced by: Daiki Hamano
Attribute type: Physical

Ren Kizaki (牙崎 漣, Kizaki Ren)
Voiced by: Shōhei Komatsu
Attribute type: Physical

Takeru Taiga (大河 タケル, Taiga Takeru)
Voiced by: Junta Terashima
Attribute type: Physical

=== F-LAGS ===
An idol unit added to the game on April 28, 2015. Unlike other units, this unit has no particular theme, though one of its members is a returning character.

Ryō Akizuki (秋月 涼, Akizuki Ryō)
Voiced by: Yūko Sanpei
Attribute type: Mental
Returning from Dearly Stars, Ryō has moved from 876 Pro to 315 Pro and is now working as a proper male idol, making his best ending in Dearly Stars the official canon. Even then, his background as a crossdressing idol is still referenced, clearly as an homage to his story in Dearly Stars, and he even retains the same voice actress from all his prior appearances.

Daigo Kabuto (兜 大吾, Kabuto Daigo)
Voiced by: Takehiro Urao
Attribute type: Physical
Daigo is a son of a yakuza gangster, the 6th generation of his family to be exact. One day, he bumped into what looked like a 'girl', and decided to take in interest in that 'girl'. The next day however, he learned from his classmates that the 'girl' he had met before turned out to be a boy named Ryō Akizuki, who revealed the truth about himself to the public. Shortly afterwards, he decided to become an idol too, thinking it would be interesting to be one. In contrast to his background, Daigo is an upbeat boy who desires to make people happy with his performances. He speaks with a Hiroshima dialect and enjoys playing fighting games.

Kazuki Tsukumo (九十九 一希, Tsukumo Kazuki)
Voiced by: Tatsuya Tokutake(2014-2020), Shunya Hiruma(2020-present)
Attribute type: Intelligent
Kazuki is a quiet and calm novelist whose father is also a novelist. Probably because he comes from a rural place far away from cities, he has social anxiety and prefers to be alone, and he easily gets motion sickness when traveling in a car. One day, Kazuki caught wind of Ryō Akizuki's public announcement on TV. Upon finding out that Ryō had started performing as a male idol, he decided to become an idol himself. Kazuki is a proficient reader who can memorize a whole book he has read, and he is also shown to be able to identify edible mushrooms.

=== Legenders ===
An idol unit themed around historical figures. Added to the game on July 22, 2016, the three members of this unit were chosen from the nine characters that made up the New Idol Discovery Project based on vote counts.

Sora Kitamura (北村 想楽, Kitamura Sora)
Voiced by: Fumiyoshi Shioya
Attribute type: Mental
Sora is a quiet young man with an artistic disposition. Previously a general store worker, he loves writing haikus, and often writes ones describing his surroundings. But as his artist brother got increasingly busier and stopped drawing, Sora was left wondering how he would be able to make a living any further, until he stumbled upon an idol audition announcement. He is based on Matsuo Bashō.

Chris Koron (古論 クリス, Koron Kurisu)
Voiced by: Wataru Komada
Attribute type: Intelligent
Chris is an avid oceanographer with such a passion for the oceans that he can be seen visiting an aquarium on some occasions. He used to work as a part-time assistant college professor, but he feared that the job was just not well-suited for him. When he overheard of his students talking about an idol concert that happened to be held at an aquarium they were visiting, Chris started thinking of becoming an idol himself. He is based on Christopher Columbus, even his own name alludes to that particular name. He is known to be Spanish by his mother's side.

Amehiko Kuzunoha (葛之葉 雨彦, Kuzunoha Amehiko)
Voiced by: Jun Kasama
Attribute type: Intelligent
Amehiko is an eccentric janitor apparently capable of seeing manifestations of negative emotions thanks to some kind of spiritual powers. Born into a family also said to have those same powers as his, since spiritual matters in that family are assigned to females, Amehiko is relegated to cleaning jobs, much to his chagrin. Having enough of the negativity of the people around him, he decided to sign up to 315 Pro as an idol. He is based on Abe no Seimei, and he is the tallest idol in the entire franchise.

=== C.FIRST ===
An idol unit introduced in Growing Stars, composed of student council presidents of three different high schools in Tokyo.

Shū Amamine (天峰 秀, Amamine Shū)
Voiced by: Yūri Ise
Attribute type: Intelligent

Momohito Hanazono (花園 百々人, Hanazono Momohito)
Voiced by: Masaya Miyazaki
Attribute type: Mental

Eishin Mayumi (眉見 鋭心, Mayumi Eishin)
Voiced by: Takeo Ōtsuka
Attribute type: Physical

=== 315 staff ===
Takashi Saitō (齋藤 孝司, Saitō Takashi)
Voiced by: Fumihiko Tachiki
The silhouetted president of 315 Production.

Ken Yamamura (山村 賢, Yamamura Ken)
Voiced by: Kengo Kawanishi
The clerk of 315 Production.

Producer (プロデューサー, Producer) (315 Production)
Voiced by: Kaito Ishikawa
The producer of 315 Production.
In the games, the producer is depicted as an androgynous person, leaving his gender ambiguous. In the anime however, the producer is clearly depicted as a male, and is the one in charge of the 315 STARS group.

== 283 Production ==
The talent agency where the main cast of The Idolmaster Shiny Colors works. There are a total of 28 idols in 283 Pro as of Song for Prism, grouped into eight units. Each of these units comes with a unique gameplay mechanic, e.g. illumination STARS uses two stats for their appeal strength instead of just one.

=== illumination STARS ===
illumination STARS (イルミネーションスターズ, Iruminēshon Sutāzu) is one of the four idol units introduced at the launch of The Idolmaster Shiny Colors. They are considered the representative of the Shiny Colors subseries. Their image color is yellow.

Mano Sakuragi (櫻木 真乃, Sakuragi Mano)
Voiced by: Hitomi Sekine
Mano is a shy, soft-spoken girl who's kind to people around her. She was scouted by the Producer while she was singing in a park and, upon learning of who she is, Mano gleefully accepted the offer to become an idol for 283 Pro, wishing to overcome her shyness. Mano loves pigeons and her singing is said to often attracts pigeons. In fact, she even owns a pet pigeon named Pii-chan.

Hiori Kazano (風野 灯織, Kazano Hiori)
Voiced by: Reina Kondō
A stoic, socially awkward high school freshman, Hiori takes everything she does seriously, to the point of doubting herself and comparing herself to others. She is harsh toward others, though in reality she is just socially awkward and wishes to be friends with anyone. Her harsh attitude aside, Hiori is a very kind girl who cares for every friend she makes.

Meguru Hachimiya (八宮 めぐる, Hachimiya Meguru)
Voiced by: Mayu Mineda
Born in the United States to a Japanese father and an American mother, Meguru came to Japan when she was in her 3rd year of elementary school. Meguru is an energetic and outgoing girl who often does sports and is very popular at her high school. She never doubts her own capacities and proves reliable when it comes to helping overcome others' worries. Since she has been used to hanging out with people she knows, Meguru hates being alone and feels lonely easily.

=== L'Antica ===
L'Antica (アンティーカ, Antīka) is one of the four idol units introduced at the launch of The Idolmaster Shiny Colors. They are best distinguished by their Gothic dress style featuring predominantly dark colors. Their image color is purple.

Kogane Tsukioka (月岡 恋鐘, Tsukioka Kogane)
Voiced by: Karin Isobe
The bustiest of the cast of Shiny Color, Kogane is a young woman from a small coastal town in Nagasaki Prefecture. She came far from her hometown for the purpose of becoming an idol. Despite having failed multiple audition, she never gave up on her aspiration and kept trying. Her strong determination and work ethics contribute to Kogane's acceptance into 283 Pro. Although she is clumsy and can be somewhat airheaded, she is very hardworking and also happens to be a gifted cook. Fittingly for where she came from, Kogane speaks with a thick Nagasaki accent.

Mamimi Tanaka (田中 摩美々, Tanaka Mamimi)
Voiced by: Chisa Suganuma
A rebellious girl with a penchant for punk fashion, Mamimi is a listless and indifferent young girl who has no interest in anything besides her own hobbies. She was raised like a spoiled brat and never grounded for acting out. As a result, she has developed a desire to be reprimanded for acting out. Mamimi was scouted by the Producer during her late night walk, asking her whether to join 283 Pro as an idol. Sensing a new purpose, she accepted the offer, believing she would be able to achieve something.

Sakuya Shirase (白瀬 咲耶, Shirase Sakuya)
Voiced by: Anna Yamaki
A former model with a cool, prince-like appearance and an aura of "perfect", Sakuya is adored by many people around her, including fellow students at an all-girls school she is attending. Likewise, she also has a desire to make others happy, mainly because she lost both her parents when she was younger, pushing her to work for her own living. Sakuya is also the tallest of the cast of Shiny Color, as well as the second tallest female idol in the entire franchise.

Yuika Mitsumine (三峰 結華, Mitsumine Yuika)
Voiced by: Runa Narumi (2018–2022), Shio Kisui (2022–present)
Yuika is an upbeat, easygoing college freshman who can easily get along with anyone. She has a great fascination for popular culture, especially idols. In reality however, Yuika is quite an introvert who was shunned for her 'weird' interests. For this reason, she purposely puts up an act of being an extrovert in order to make sure no one can see her true self. Predictably, this act has taken a toll on her sense of self, leading her to become an idol herself.

Kiriko Yūkoku (幽谷 霧子, Yūkoku Kiriko)
Voiced by: Mizuki Yuina
In contrast to her mysterious, Gothic appearance and speech manner, Kiriko is a gentle and kind girl who worries about everything and easily gets nervous. It's unknown how she got so many bandages around her body, but it is said that whenever her anxiety got the better of her, she would wrap herself in bandages in order to keep herself at ease. Outside of her work as an idol, Kiriko can be found volunteering at a local hospital to entertain the patients.

=== Hōkago Climax Girls ===
Hōkago Climax Girls (放課後クライマックスガールズ, Hōkago Kuraimakkusu Gāruzu) is one of the four idol units introduced at the launch of The Idolmaster Shiny Colors. As their unit name suggests, they take on the Super Sentai theme as their idol image. Their image color is orange.

Kaho Komiya (小宮 果穂, Komiya Kaho)
Voiced by: Hiyori Kono

Chiyoko Sonoda (園田 智代子, Sonoda Chiyoko)
Voiced by: Haruka Shiraishi

Juri Saijō (西城 樹里, Saijō Juri)
Voiced by: Mariko Nagai

Rinze Morino (杜野 凛世, Morino Rinze)
Voiced by: Wakana Maruoka

Natsuha Arisugawa (有栖川 夏葉, Arisugawa Natsuha)
Voiced by: Akiho Suzumoto

=== ALSTROEMERIA ===
ALSTROEMERIA (アルストロメリア, Arusutoromeria) is one of the four idol units introduced at the launch of The Idolmaster Shiny Colors. Named after the flower of the same name, they are described as a "pop and happy" type of idol unit. Their image color is pink.

Amana Ōsaki (大崎 甘奈, Ōsaki Amana)
Voiced by: Honoka Kuroki

Tenka Ōsaki (大崎 甜花, Ōsaki Tenka)
Voiced by: Ryōko Maekawa

Chiyuki Kuwayama (桑山 千雪, Kuwayama Chiyuki)
Voiced by: Noriko Shibasaki

=== Straylight ===
Straylight (ストレイライト, Sutoreiraito) is an idol unit introduced in the 1st Anniversary of Shiny Colors. Their image color is red.

Asahi Serizawa (芹沢 あさひ, Serizawa Asahi)
Voiced by: Yuki Tanaka

Fuyuko Mayuzumi (黛 冬優子, Mayuzumi Fuyuko)
Voiced by: Eri Yukimura

Mei Izumi (和泉 愛依, Izumi Mei)
Voiced by: Sayaka Kitahara

=== noctchill ===
noctchill (ノクチル, Nokuchiru) is an idol unit introduced in the 2nd Anniversary of Shiny Colors. They are composed of four childhood friends. Their image color is light blue.

Tōru Asakura (浅倉 透, Asakura Tōru)
Voiced by: Yū Wakui

Madoka Higuchi (樋口 円香, Higuchi Madoka)
Voiced by: Rio Tsuchiya

Koito Fukumaru (福丸 小糸, Fukumaru Koito)
Voiced by: Saran Tajima

Hinana Ichikawa (市川 雛菜, Ichikawa Hinana)
Voiced by: Miho Okasaki

=== SHHis ===
SHHis (シーズ, Shizu) is an idol unit introduced in the 3rd Anniversary of Shiny Colors. Their image color is green.

Nichika Nanakusa (七草 にちか, Nanakusa Nichika)
Voiced by: Azusa Shizuki
Nichika is a young girl best described as average in everything, which is why she aspired to become an idol. Raised by her older sister Hazuki ever since their father died and their mother was hospitalized, Nichika has always looked up to idols, especially the one particular idol who disappeared long ago. However, she has a very low self-worth and often underestimates herself, even comparing herself unfavorably to Mikoto. Because of this, she has fears that she will never stand a chance as an idol. That said, Nichika is quite a high-spirited girl and also highly sociable.

Mikoto Aketa (緋田 美琴, Aketa Mikoto)
Voiced by: Aya Yamane
A famous veteran idol and the oldest of the cast of Shiny Colors, Mikoto became infatuated with the idea of a pop idol when she moved from her hometown in Hokkaido. She worked so hard to become one that she has neglected other aspects of her life, even she claims she can't remember anything outside of her idol activities. Nonetheless, she is very well-known for her talents. As a result, Mikoto can be described as a foil to Nichika in many ways.
According to her background, Mikoto transferred to 283 Pro from an unnamed talent agency, but before that, she is known to have been paired with Luca Ikaruga for another agency in the past.

=== CoMETIK ===
CoMETIK (コメティック, Kometikku) is an idol unit that is introduced in Song for Prism. Luca first appeared in the 3rd Anniversary update, while Hana and Haruki were introduced in a concert held in July 2023. Their image color is black.

Luca Ikaruga (斑鳩 ルカ, Ikaruga Ruka)
Voiced by: Rina Kawaguchi
Luca Ikaruga is a mysterious solo idol introduced in the 3rd Anniversary of Shiny Colors as a rival. A brooding, cynical young woman, she gained a cult following from the troubled young females during her solo idol career. As a rival idol, Luca initially had a low opinion of 283 Production, and especially despises Nichika Nanakusa, who she believes has taken everything from her. It is revealed that Luca was born to a legendary idol who once worked under the tutelage of the now-president of 283 Pro, and that she was once paired with Mikoto Aketa, with whom she was supposed to debut together.
When Song for Prism was announced, Luca has ironically become part of 283 Production.

Hana Suzuki (鈴木 羽那, Suzuki Hana)
Voiced by: Haruna Mikawa

Haruki Ikuta (郁田 はるき, Ikuta Haruki)
Voiced by: Rena Ozawa

=== 283 Production staff ===
Tsutomu Amai (天井 努, Amai Tsutomu)
Voiced by: Kenjiro Tsuda
The president of 283 Production.

Hazuki Nanakusa (七草 はづき, Nanakusa Hazuki)
Voiced by: Hibiku Yamamura
The clerk at 283 Production who also holds several part-time jobs. She is also Nichika's older sister.

Producer (プロデューサー, Producer) (283 Production)
Voiced by: Kyōhei Natsume
The producer of 283 Production.

== Hatsuboshi Academy ==
An idol training school where the main cast of Gakuen Idolmaster attends. It is later revealed that this school is affiliated with 100 Production.

=== Idol Department students ===
Saki Hanami (花海 咲季, Hanami Saki)
Voiced by: Aoi Nagatsuki
A freshman at Hatsuboshi Academy after having aced the entrance exam, Saki is a child prodigy with an athletic constitution and a competitive spirit. She was a middle school athlete before joining Hatsuboshi, with her physical abilities comparable to most upperclassmen. She is very close to her younger sister Ume, who also happened to be a middle school athlete like her. That said, Saki has fears that her sister would soon outdo her in anything.

Temari Tsukimura (月村 手毬, Tsukimura Temari)
Voiced by: Nao Ojika
Once known as the "Number One Middle School Idol", Temari is a top-notch singer with a troubled past as an idol and two vastly different personalities: her usual self, a cool and sharp-tongued girl who vehemently pushes herself whenever she's on stage; and a spoiled, lazy troublemaker that makes her subject to bad rumors. She aims to be a top idol to help do away with someone she hates. It is known that Temari was once part of an idol unit named "SyngUp!" with Misuzu Hataya and Rinha Kaya before they suddenly broke up.

Kotone Fujita (藤田 ことね, Fujita Kotone)
Voiced by: Hikaru Iida
Hailing from a poor family, Kotone is an expressive girl with a cute face. She wants to be an idol in order to make money, so as to also support her family. To this end, she had her parents agree on her enrolling in Hatsuboshi Academy, but her poor grades and the school's tuition costs caused her family to drift apart. Sensing responsibility for all of her family problems, she has since taken various part-time jobs to pay up her debt and pay for her tuition. Kotone is acquaintanced with Sena Juō, whose liking of her talents really bothers her.

Rinami Himesaki (姫崎 莉波, Himesaki Rinami)
Voiced by: Yuri Usui
A third year student at Hatsuboshi Academy and a member of the school's student council, Rinami is something of a gentle older-sister figure. Younger students love her for being a reliable helping hand. Even outside of school, she is always ready to jump to anyone's aid. That aside, Rinami has always wanted to be close to the Producer ever since they met again at Hatsuboshi. Back when the two were still young children, Rinami crossed paths with the Producer by chance and already developed feelings for him.

Sumika Shiun (紫雲 清夏, Shiun Sumika)
Voiced by: Miya Minato
A frivolous and silly girl who's into the gal fashion, Sumika has got a bright and energetic personality that lets her get along with anyone. Before she attended Hatsuboshi Academy, Sumika was a ballet dancer, and a proficient one at that. In fact, she was expected to one day go professional, but she suddenly quit for some reason. She first met Lilja when she went to Sweden for ballet and the two quickly became friends thereafter.

Hiro Shinosawa (篠澤 広, Shinosawa Hiro)
Voiced by: Reina Kawamura
A young genius with a mysterious vibe, Hiro can be described as a kind of child prodigy. She finds thrill in trying something new and is unafraid of failure. Having graduated from an overseas university study at the age of 14, Hiro grew tired of how easy she's had it in her life. Desiring a new challenge, she applied for entrance to Hatsuboshi Academy. Despite failing the practical subjects, she still passed the entrance exam thanks to her interview skills.

Lilja Katsuragi (葛城 リーリヤ, Katsuragi Rīriya)
Voiced by: Kana Hanaiwa
Born and raised in Sweden, Lilja came to Japan just recently, only to immediately become fascinated by idols, leading her to enroll in Hatsuboshi Academy. Despite lacking in the talents necessary to become an idol, Lilja is a hard worker who never gives up on her dream. In fact, she had promised to Sumika that one day they will perform on stage together. It is known that Lilja's father is Japanese, and that Lilja likes watching magical girl and mecha anime.

China Kuramoto (倉本 千奈, Kuramoto China)
Voiced by: Mao Itō
Born to a wealthy family, China is an innocent, carefree girl who lived a sheltered life. She enrolled in Hatsuboshi Academy to become a 'respectable idol'. Ever since then however, she has doubts about her own abilities as an idol, which she admits to being the lowest among all the students. In reality, China failed the entrance exam, but her grandfather, who happens to be an old friend of the principal, convinced him to let her in anyway, and find a producer for her.

Mao Arimura (有村 麻央, Arimura Mao)
Voiced by: Tsumugi Nanase
A dormitory head at Hatsuboshi Academy, Mao has a prince-like aura and aspires to become a cool-type idol. In fact, she is even affectionately called 'Little Prince' for her boyish looks. That said, some still find her small and cute, mainly because she is no taller than most other girls. It is known that Mao used to be a child actress, but as she grew up, she developed a complex about her physical development, feeling that she would never be able to achieve her ideal image.

Ume Hanami (花海 佑芽, Hanami Ume)
Voiced by: Ayane Matsuda
Saki's younger sister, Ume enrolled in Hatsuboshi Academy just recently. She looks up to her sister and does have many things in common with her, including being physically fit. Unlike her sister however, Ume is not as good at academic subjects.
During the early production stage, Ume was originally going to be a playable character before her role was swapped with Saki. She was eventually made playable just two weeks after the game was released.

Sena Juō (十王 星南, Juō Sena)
Voiced by: Mashiro Hitaka
The principal's granddaughter and the current student council president of Hatsuboshi Academy, Sena is extremely popular with fellow students. Having been raised to become an elite idol from a young age, she is considered the "Academy's Top Idol" and is also the "Prima Stella". For some reason, Sena seems to have developed a taste for idol talents, as seen when she first met Kotone Fujita, whose talents managed to capture her interest.
She was made playable via an update released in November 2024.

Misuzu Hataya (秦谷 美鈴, Hataya Misuzu)
Voiced by: Non Harusaki
Elegant-looking and exceptionally gentle, Misuzu is a laid-back girl who loves to dote on people she likes. She is best friends with Temari Tsukimura, whom she spoils so badly that she tends to worry a lot whenever Temari performs on stage. In reality, the two used to perform together as a unit, named "SyngUp!", with another girl, before their differences got the better of them, leading the unit to disband. Since then though, Misuzu and Temari have reconciled with each other.
She was made playable via an update released in May 2025 as part of the game's first anniversary event.

Tsubame Amaya (雨夜 燕, Amaya Tsubame)
Voiced by: Yukari Amane
Student council vice president of Hatsuboshi Academy, Tsubame is a childhood friend of Sena, with whom she has a friendly rivalry. She seems to be very confident in her abilities and is also very strict with herself and fellow students. Tired of being the long-time Number 2 Idol at Hatsuboshi Academy, Tsubame aspires to one day become the new "Prima Stella".
She was added as a rival idol in November 2024, the same time Sena Juō became playable. She would be made playable via an update one year later.

Kanae Hiwatari (氷渡香名江, Hiwatari Kanae)
Voiced by: Sayaka Abe
China's serious and hardworking housemaid. Putting China at top of her priority, she is otherwise very oblivious to her own feelings. She believes she simply wants to support China's journey as an idol, despite having an innate talent to become one.
She was added as a playable idol on November 16, 2026.

=== Other students ===
Yū Mashiro (真城 優, Mashiro Yū)
Voiced by: Ayaka Murata
A second year student in the Regular Course, Yū is currently the MC of the Broadcast Club. She hosts a school radio program, where she has some talk with the Idol Department students.

=== Hatsuboshi Academy staff ===
Kunio Juō (十王 邦夫, Juō Kunio)
Voiced by: Akio Otsuka
The founder and principal of Hatsuboshi Academy, as well as the founder of 100 Production. He is also Sena's grandfather.

Asari Neo (根緒 亜紗里, Neo Asari)
Voiced by: Aoi Koga
A homeroom teacher at Hatsuboshi Academy.

Producer (プロデューサー, Producer) (Hatsuboshi Academy)
Voiced by: Yūki Shin
The producer of Hatsuboshi Academy. He is a freshman of specialized college's department of producer.

=== 100 Production staff ===
Ryūsei Juō (十王 龍正, Juō Ryūsei)
Voiced by: Hikaru Midorikawa
The president of 100 Production. He is also Kunio's son and Sena's father.

== Other characters ==
=== The Idolmaster Dearly Stars ===
Mai Hidaka (日高 舞, Hidaka Mai)
Voiced by: Ryoka Yuzuki (Splash Red drama CD)
Mai Hidaka is the mother of Ai Hidaka. She is 29 years old, which means that she was indeed very young when she became a mother. Because of her youth, Mai is rather sporadic and very energetic, though never to the point Ai can get. She was once a legendary S-Rank super idol who won the Ultimate Idol, but she was only active for three years before abruptly retiring. Her image song "ALIVE" was extremely popular, and she even later allowed her daughter to adopt the song as her own when she became an idol. Later in Ai's story, Mai suddenly comes out of retirement with Manami Okamoto as her manager. Her sole reason for coming out of retirement at all is she thought it would be fun and interesting to stand on stage with her daughter.

Ayane Suzuki (鈴木 彩音, Suzuki Ayane)
Voiced by: Yurin (Innocent Blue drama CD)
Ayane Suzuki, who prefers to be called Cineria (サイネリア, Saineria), is a fairly high ranking net idol, as well as Eri Mizutani's chat buddy. When Eri was still a net idol, Ayane was supportive of Eri, wishing the best of her ability whenever she could. As someone who looked up to Eri back in her net idol days, Ayane believes that Reiko Ozaki had tricked the pure Eri into joining the "Dark Side" and tries to make Eri reconsider her choice.
In The Idolmaster 2, Cineria is the name of a news reporter. This seems to allude to the ending of The Idolmaster Innocent Blue volume 3. A unit with this name also appears on the "DO-TOP TV" ranking.

Reiko Ozaki (尾崎 玲子, Ozaki Reiko)
Voiced by: Yū Asakawa (Innocent Blue drama CD)
Reiko Ozaki is a freelance producer who discovered the talents of Eri Mizutani upon watching one of her videos. Ozaki started scouting Eri and emailed her everyday, offering her a job as a live idol and asking her to meet her in person. Ozaki temporarily makes a contract with 876 Production and debuts Eri under the company label. Ozaki herself was once an idol, part of an idol duo known as riola, paired with another girl, Satomi Kondō. During her idol career, Ozaki never got past F-Rank due to slanderous comments about the unit and their agency's president that were posted online. This caused her to hate the internet and drives her desire to protect Eri from it. The song "Precog" was going to be her last image song, but it went unfinished by the end of her career. She later allowed Eri to finish the song and use it as her own.

Sōichi Takeda (武田 蒼一, Takeda Sōichi)
Voiced by: Tatsuhisa Suzuki (Neue Green drama CD)
Sōichi Takeda is a talented music producer who also writes songs on the side, depending on his mood. While he plays a minor role in the series, he has the biggest role in Ryō's story in Dearly Stars. Takeda has a strong passion for instrumental jazz and classical music and is in fact the host of a radio show called "Old Whistle", which he created to honor classical music. However, he also has a dream of creating an idol that could help ascend music. In fact, before he took interest in Ryō, Takeda only allowed one other idol, Chihaya Kisaragi, whose talents he was quick to recognize, to appear on "Old Whistle". Chihaya had personally approached Takeda several times to have him write a song for her, only to be turned down as he felt that talent like hers would be wasted on a song written on a whim. Takeda was also the one who wrote the song "Dazzling World", which eventually became Ryō's image song. As he collaborates with Ryō, Takeda is able to learn and challenge himself to the point where Ryō can finally stand and the two can achieve their respective dreams.

Yumeko Sakurai (桜井 夢子, Sakurai Yumeko)
Voiced by: Sayuri Yahagi (Neue Green drama CD)
Yumeko Sakurai is a freelance idol who's determined to achieve her dream no matter what it takes. Introduced as rival to Ryō Akizuki, she is thought to be an extremely talented idol, though it is revealed that she has cheated her way to the top by sabotaging rival idols by various means, including giving them a candy that clogs the vocal chords or making the stage floor slippery. After Ryō convinces her to stop, Yumeko reveals that her dream was to appear as a guest on Takeda's radio show "Old Whistle". Despite being rivals, she frequently hangs out with Ryō to talk about their upcoming auditions. After Ryō reveals himself as a boy, Yumeko starts to have a crush on him, much to her discomfort. Yumeko also has an extremely high admiration for Azusa Miura, such that she refers to her as an older sister.

=== The Idolmaster Starlit Season ===
Kohaku Okuzora (奧空 心白, Okuzora Kohaku)
Voiced by: Aimi Tanaka
Kohaku Okuzora is an idol scouted by 765 Production's Producer for Project Luminous. Her birthday is the same as the release date of The Idolmaster arcade game.
In the game, when she met the 765 Production producer for the first time, Kohaku revealed that she first heard of 765 Pro from her mother. It is also revealed that she was once an idol for 961 Production, having previously been a member of the idol unit "AlbaNoct", paired with Aya.
At the end of Starlit Season, Kohaku has been signed up to 0936 Production, a talent agency founded by none other than her mother.

Aya (亜夜, Aya)
Voiced by: Rina Hidaka
Another new character introduced in The Idolmaster Starlit Season, Aya is a fiercely competitive idol who's determined to become better than anyone, even her own teammates. She was first introduced as an idol for 961 Production and a member of the idol unit Diamant, along with Leon and Shika. She was previously paired with Kohaku as the idol unit "AlbaNoct", also by 961 Pro.
At the end of Starlit Season, she reunites with Kohaku as they join 0936 Production as its first idols.

Mayumi Okuzora (奥空 眞弓, Okuzora Mayumi)
Voiced by: Masako Katsuki
A famous actress, Mayumi Okuzora is the mother of Kohaku Okuzora. Following an incident that caused Kohaku to leave 961 Production, Mayumi became protective of her daughter and didn't want her to become an idol again. She eventually agreed with the 765 Production producer to let Kohaku start over her idol career, but on the condition that he must help solve Kohaku's problem by summer, otherwise she will have to retire as an idol for good.
At the end of Starlit Season, Mayumi has just founded her own talent agency, 0936 Production.

== Legacy ==
Bandai Namco Entertainment (and to an extent, Aniplex) has allowed third-party companies and organizations to use the franchise's characters in their promotions both individually or as a group. Miki Hoshii was named the store manager of Tower Records' Japanese branches on March 21, 2011, at the retailer's Shinjuku branch. In 2012, the Tokyo Shrine Agency distributed posters and pamphlets featuring the 765 Production idols as part of a campaign to attract hatsumōde visitors. Sagan Tosu featured the idol characters of Cinderella Girls on the tickets and merchandises for their September 12, 2015, match against the Shimizu S-Pulse and September 26, 2015, match against the Ventforet Kofu. In November 2016, Mimura Kanako was appointed as the campaign girl for Boul'mich, a French chocolate shop in Japan.

On September 6, 2018, Nissin Foods teamed up with Bandai Namco for a music video featuring Honda Mio, Hino Akane and Takamori Aiko as the unit Positive Passion advertising their Curry Meshi product titled "Spice Paradise", produced by Sanzigen. A CD including eight versions of "Spice Paradise" was released in a special box also including 6 Curry Meshi cups and a clear file on September 18. The music video features Curry Meshi's mascot, Curry Meshi-kun. Five months earlier, SideM also had its own collaboration with Nissin Foods, albeit with their Cup Meshi instant rice product. The SideM/Cup Meshi collaboration featured Michio Hazama, Rui Maita, and Jirō Yamashita, all three of which form the S.E.M unit in SideM.

=== 2019 Cinderella Girls general election ===
In late April 2019, non-Japanese fans of the Cinderella Girls sub-series of the Idolmaster franchise started pairing the then-unvoiced Brazilian character Natalia with Solid Snake of Konami's Metal Gear franchise. On April 22, 2019, Canadian YouTuber Mahado, a fan of the series, released a video in which Solid Snake, voiced by David Hayter, urges players to vote for Natalia in the 2019 Cinderella Girls general election, with audio by PepsiJohnny and Japanese subtitles by ThePascalPama. The campaign involved both players in and outside Japan, and at the end of September 2019, Natalia placed 9th in the overall preliminary rankings (3rd in Passion idol rankings) in the election and finally got a voice actress, Teru Ikuta.
