= List of The Idolmaster media =

The Idolmaster is a series of raising simulation and rhythm video games created by Namco Bandai Games (formerly Namco). Its first game premiered in Japan in 2005 as an arcade game, and the series has grown to numerous ports, sequels and spin-offs across multiple video game consoles, including three social network games. While the series is largely only available in Japan, the three versions of The Idolmaster Shiny Festa were localized into English and released worldwide on iOS. The Idolmaster series has spawned many works in other media including anime, manga, novels, radio shows and drama CDs.

In addition to the video game series, the stand-alone anime series Idolmaster: Xenoglossia has its own manga and novel adaptations, and the manga series Puchimas! Petit Idolmaster later inspired an anime series and drama CDs. The music releases in the series include over 100 albums and singles with songs sung by the voice actors from the games. Many of the music releases feature the songs in remix versions in different arrangements. The Idolmaster had earned over 10 billion yen in music CD and concert sales as of 2013. Various companion books for the games and anime adaptations have also been released which include detailed walkthroughs for the games and art collections.

== Video games ==
Each game in the main series deals with the training of prospective pop idols on their way to stardom. The main talent agency featured in the series is 765 Production, and other studios introduced in later games include 876 Production featured in The Idolmaster Dearly Stars, and 961 Production originally introduced in The Idolmaster SP, but which later returns in The Idolmaster 2. While the first set of games are set in the same timeline up to and including The Idolmaster SP, a separate timeline is introduced in The Idolmaster Dearly Stars, the first game in the franchise's next stage called "2nd Vision", which was described as The Idolmaster's next project that would further expand the series' world. As the series progressed, two social network games were developed: The Idolmaster Cinderella Girls in 2011 and The Idolmaster Million Live! in 2013; both games feature a card battle system and together introduced over 100 additional idols. A third social network game was developed in 2014 titled The Idolmaster SideM, which also features a card battle system and only contains male idols.

Game	Japanese release date
The Idolmaster	July 26, 2005
Notes: Released on Namco System 246 arcade system board; Also released on Xbox 360 with improvements and additions on January 25, 2007
The Idolmaster Happening Location	2005
Notes: Released on feature phones
The Idolmaster Live For You!	February 28, 2008
Notes: Released on Xbox 360; Also released in the two-game collection The Idolmaster Twins with The Idolmaster on March 12, 2009
The Idolmaster SP	February 19, 2009
Notes: Released on PlayStation Portable; Three versions were released: Perfect Sun, Missing Moon and Wandering Star
The Idolmaster Dearly Stars	September 17, 2009
Notes: Released on Nintendo DS
The Idolmaster Mobile	December 21, 2010
Notes: Released on feature phones sold by au, NTT DoCoMo and SoftBank via browser
The Idolmaster 2	February 24, 2011
Notes: Released on Xbox 360; Also available on PlayStation 3
The Idolmaster Gravure For You!	October 27, 2011 – June 28, 2012
Notes: Released on PlayStation 3; Nine volumes were released: 1. October 27, 2011; 2. November 23, 2011; 3. December 29, 2011; 4. January 26, 2012; 5. February 23, 2012; 6. March 29, 2012; 7. April 26, 2012; 8. May 24, 2012; 9. June 28, 2012
The Idolmaster Cinderella Girls	November 28, 2011
Notes: Released on Android and iOS via the Mobage platform; Also released as an Android app on November 16, 2014 and an iOS app on November 25, 2014
The Idolmaster Mobile i	March 30, 2012
Notes: Released as an iOS app
The Idolmaster Live in Slot	May 23, 2012
Notes: Released on pachinko
The Idolmaster Shiny Festa	October 25, 2012
Notes: Released on PlayStation Portable; Three versions were released: Honey Sound, Funky Note and Groovy Tune; Also released on iOS and localized into English on April 22, 2013; The iOS versions have different titles: Honey Sound became Harmonic Score, Funky Note became Rhythmic Record and Groovy Tune became Melodic Disc; Also released on PlayStation 3 with the three versions bundled together under the title The Idolmaster Shiny TV
The Idolmaster Million Live!	February 27, 2013
Notes: Released on Android, iOS, and feature phones sold by au, NTT DoCoMo and SoftBank via the GREE platform; Also released as an Android app on October 21, 2014; The game's service was discontinued on March 19, 2018
The Idolmaster SideM	February 28, 2014
Notes: Released on Android and iOS via the Mobage platform; The game's service was discontinued on January 5, 2023
The Idolmaster One For All	May 15, 2014
Notes: Released on PlayStation 3
The Idolmaster Cinderella Girls Gravure For You!	April 23, 2015 – February 25, 2016
Notes: Released on PlayStation 3; Nine volumes were released: 1. April 23, 2015; 2. June 25, 2015; 3. July 23, 2015; 4. August 27, 2015; 5. September 25, 2015; 6. November 26, 2015; 7. December 23, 2015; 8. January 28, 2016; 9. February 25, 2016
The Idolmaster Cinderella Girls: Starlight Stage	September 3, 2015
Notes: Released on Android and iOS
The Idolmaster Must Songs	December 10, 2015
Notes: Released on PlayStation Vita; Crossover game with the Taiko no Tatsujin series
The Idolmaster Platinum Stars	July 28, 2016
Notes: Released on PlayStation 4
The Idolmaster Cinderella Girls: Viewing Revolution	October 13, 2016
Notes: Released on PlayStation 4 with PlayStation VR
The Idolmaster Million Live!: Theater Days	June 29, 2017
Notes: Released on Android and iOS
The Idolmaster SideM: Live on Stage!	August 29, 2017
Notes: Released on Android and iOS; The game's service was discontinued on August 31, 2021

== Anime ==
Title	Release dates
Idolmaster: Xenoglossia	April 4, 2007 – September 24, 2007
Notes: A 26-episode anime television series produced by Sunrise which re-imagines the idols from The Idolmaster as fighter pilots for mecha
The Idolmaster Live For You!	February 28, 2008
Notes: A 17-minute original video animation (OVA) episode produced by Actas; Included in the limited edition of The Idolmaster Live For You! game
The Idolmaster	July 8, 2011 – December 23, 2011
Notes: A 25-episode anime television series adaptation produced by A-1 Pictures; An OVA episode was released on June 16, 2012
The Idolmaster Shiny Festa	October 25, 2012
Notes: A three-episode OVA series by A-1 Pictures; The episodes were bundled with the three The Idolmaster Shiny Festa games
Puchimas! Petit Idolmaster	January 1, 2013 – March 29, 2013
Notes: Based on the manga by Akane; A 64-episode original net animation series produced by Gathering; An OVA episode was bundled with ASCII Media Works' Dengeki Maoh magazine in October 2012
The Idolmaster Movie: Beyond the Brilliant Future!	January 25, 2014
Notes: A theatrical anime film adaptation produced by A-1 Pictures
Puchimas!! Puchi Puchi Idolmaster	April 1, 2014 – June 30, 2014
Notes: Based on the manga by Akane; A 74-episode original net animation series produced by Gathering
The Idolmaster Cinderella Girls	January 10, 2015 – October 16, 2015
Notes: A 25-episode anime television series adaptation produced by A-1 Pictures; An OVA episode was released on February 25, 2016.
The Idolmaster Cinderella Girls Theater	April 4, 2017 – June 25, 2019
Notes: Based on the manga The Idolmaster Cinderella Girls: Cinderella Girls Theater in The Idolmaster Cinderella Girls video game.
The Idolmaster SideM	October 7, 2017 – December 30, 2017
Notes: A 13-episode anime television series adaptation produced by A-1 Pictures
The Idolmaster SideM Wake Atte Mini!	October 9, 2018 – December 25, 2018
Notes: Based on the manga by Sumeragi; A 15-episode anime television series produced by Zero-G
The Idolmaster Cinderella Girls U149	April 6, 2023
Notes: A 13-episode anime television series adaptation produced by CygamesPictures; based on 2016 manga
The Idolmaster Million Live!	October 8, 2023
Notes: A 12-episode anime television series adaptation produced by Shirogumi; based on 2013 game
The Idolmaster Shiny Colors	2024
Notes: A 24-episode anime television series adaptation produced by Polygon Pictures; based on 2018 game and 2019 manga

== Radio shows ==
There have been 15 radio shows for The Idolmaster hosted by the voice actors of the idols from the video games and anime adaptations, five of which are still ongoing. While two of the shows have been broadcast on traditional radio channels, with the advent of the Internet, the remaining 13 have been distributed online. Used primarily to promote the franchise, 12 of the shows are for the video games and the remaining three are for the anime adaptations Idolmaster: Xenoglossia (2007), The Idolmaster (2011) and Puchimas! Petit Idolmaster (2013). Many of the shows have later been released on CD compilation volumes.

Title	Release dates
The Idolmaster Radio	April 9, 2006 – July 26, 2009
Notes: Hosted by Chiaki Takahashi (Azusa Miura) and Asami Imai (Chihaya Kisaragi); Broadcast 173 episodes on Radio Osaka; Released by Nippon Columbia on seven CDs
Radio de Aima Show!	April 27, 2006 – October 25, 2007
Notes: Hosted by Eriko Nakamura (Haruka Amami), Asami Imai (Chihaya Kisaragi), Yurika Ochiai (Yukiho Hagiwara) and Mayako Nigo (Yayoi Takatsuki); Broadcast 79 episodes online on Animate TV; Released by Frontier Works on 10 CDs
Haruka to Yayoi no Yayoishiki Radio	March 9, 2007 – February 22, 2008
Notes: Hosted by Yuka Iguchi (Haruka Amami) and Ami Koshimizu (Yayoi Takatsuki); Broadcast 51 episodes online on Lantis Web Radio, Beat Net Radio! and Nifty; Released by Lantis on two CDs; Radio show for Idolmaster: Xenoglossia
Web Radio Shopping Master	March 23, 2007 – July 27, 2007
Notes: Hosted by Eriko Nakamura (Haruka Amami), Akiko Hasegawa (Miki Hoshii) and Asami Shimoda (Ami and Mami Futami); Broadcast 18 episodes online on the marketplace section of the official The Idolmaster website
The Idolmaster Radio For You!	November 28, 2007 – September 24, 2008
Notes: Hosted by Eriko Nakamura (Haruka Amami), Asami Imai (Chihaya Kisaragi) and Mayako Nigo (Yayoi Takatsuki); Broadcast 45 episodes online on Animate TV; Released by Frontier Works on six CDs; Radio show for The Idolmaster Live For You!
The Idolmaster P.S. Producer	October 15, 2008 – September 16, 2009
Notes: Hosted by Eriko Nakamura (Haruka Amami) and Akiko Hasegawa (Miki Hoshii); Broadcast 49 episodes online on Animate TV; Released by Frontier Works on four CDs; Radio show for The Idolmaster SP
Dearly Station	July 11, 2009 – August 31, 2009
Notes: Hosted by Kana Hanazawa (Eri Mizutani), Haruka Tomatsu (Ai Hidaka) and Yuuko Sanpei (Ryō Akizuki); Broadcast five episodes online on Niconico's channel Tarukitei; Radio show for The Idolmaster Dearly Stars
The Idolmaster Station!!	August 2, 2009 – March 31, 2013, October 8, 2014 – October 10, 2018
Notes: Hosted by Manami Numakura (Hibiki Ganaha), Yumi Hara (Takane Shijō), Asami Imai (Chihaya Kisaragi) (Broadcasts 1-88) and Azumi Asakura (Yukiho Hagiwara) (Broadcasts 89–192); Broadcast 192 episodes on Radio Osaka; Released by Nippon Columbia on seven CDs; This radio show was revived on October 8, 2014, replacing The Idolm@ster Station!!+, with Manami Numakura, Yumi Hara and Azumi Asakura as the hosts.
Radio de Aima Star	October 8, 2009 – March 31, 2011
Notes: Hosted by Eriko Nakamura (Haruka Amami), Mayako Nigo (Yayoi Takatsuki) and Akiko Hasegawa (Miki Hoshii); Broadcast 74 episodes online on Animate TV; Released by Frontier Works on three CDs
Aima Studio	April 8, 2011 – ongoing
Notes: Hosted by Eriko Nakamura (Haruka Amami) and Asami Imai (Chihaya Kisaragi); Broadcast online on Hibiki Radio Station; Radio show for The Idolmaster anime series
Radio de Aima Chu!!	April 21, 2011 – November 27, 2014
Notes: Hosted by Mayako Nigo (Yayoi Takatsuki), Asami Shimoda (Ami and Mami Futami) and Akiko Hasegawa (Miki Hoshii); Broadcast online on Animate TV; Released by Frontier Works on five CDs
Dere Raji!	August 30, 2012 – ongoing
Notes: Hosted by Ayaka Ōhashi (Uzuki Shimamura), Ayaka Fukuhara (Rin Shibuya) and Haruka Yoshimura (Mika Jōgasaki); Broadcast online on Niconico's Hibiki Radio Station channel; Radio show for The Idolmaster Cinderlla Girls
Puchimas! Zōkangō	December 27, 2012 – March 30, 2013
Notes: Hosted by Yumi Hara (Takane Shijō) and Azumi Asakura (Yukiho Hagiwara); Broadcast 13 episodes online on Niconico; Radio show for Puchimas! Petit Idolmaster
The Idolmaster Station!!+	April 1, 2013 – October 1, 2014
Notes: Hosted by Manami Numakura (Hibiki Ganaha) and Yumi Hara (Takane Shijō); Broadcast online on Nippon Cultural Broadcasting's streaming service Chō! A&G+; Released by Nippon Columbia on two CDs
The Idolmaster Million Radio	April 26, 2013 – ongoing
Notes: Hosted by Haruka Yamazaki (Mirai Kasuga), Momo Asakura (Serika Hakozaki) and Azusa Tadokoro (Shizuka Mogami); Broadcast on Niconico's Niconico Namahōsō channel; Radio show for The Idolmaster Million Live!; Released by Lantis on two CDs
315PRO Night!	April 3, 2015 – ongoing
Notes: Hosted by Various; Broadcast on Niconico's Niconico Namahōsō channel; Radio show for The Idolmaster SideM
The Idolmaster Music On the Radio	October 18, 2018 – ongoing
Notes: Hosted by Manami Numakura (Hibiki Ganaha); Replaces STATION after its second run's end; Broadcast on Niconico's Niconico Namahōsō channel; Radio show for news and music of all branches of the franchise

== Soundtracks ==
=== Series ===
Title	Release dates
The Idolmaster Masterpiece	September 28, 2005 – May 31, 2006
Notes: Five compilation albums; Contains music from the arcade version of The Idolmaster; Released by Nippon Columbia
The Idolmaster Master Box	July 19, 2006 – February 10, 2013
Notes: Nine box set compilations; Contains music up to and including The Idolmaster 2; Released by Nippon Columbia
The Idolmaster Masterwork	December 20, 2006 – March 22, 2007
Notes: One single and three compilation albums; Contains music from the Xbox 360 version of The Idolmaster; Released by Nippon Columbia
Idolmaster: Xenoglossia Original Soundtrack	June 27, 2007 – September 5, 2007
Notes: Two albums; Contains music from Idolmaster: Xenoglossia; Released by Lantis
The Idolmaster Master Artist	July 18, 2007 – October 24, 2007
Notes: 11 compilations albums; Released by Nippon Columbia
Idolmaster: Xenoglossia Character Album	August 22, 2007 – October 10, 2007
Notes: Two character song cover albums; Released by Lantis
The Idolmaster Master Live	February 13, 2008 – October 29, 2008
Notes: One single and six compilation albums; Contains music from The Idolmaster Live For You!; Released by Nippon Columbia
Famison 8-Bit The Idolmaster	March 25, 2008 – October 19, 2011
Notes: Six compilation albums; Released by 5pb. Records
The Idolmaster Master Special	December 10, 2008 – March 17, 2010
Notes: Two singles and eight compilation albums; Contains music from The Idolmaster SP; Released by Nippon Columbia
The Idolmaster Dream Symphony	September 9, 2009 – December 2, 2009
Notes: One single and three compilation albums; Contains music from The Idolmaster Dearly Stars; Released by Nippon Columbia
The Idolmaster Vocal Collection	February 24, 2010 – April 21, 2010
Notes: Two compilation albums; Contains music from Radio de Aima Show!, The Idolmaster Radio For You!, The Idolmaster P.S. Producer, The Idolmaster Eternal Prism, and Radio de Aima Star; Released by Frontier Works
The Idolmaster Best of 765+876=!!	May 12, 2010 – July 4, 2010
Notes: Three compilation albums and two limited edition albums; Released by Nippon Columbia
The Idolmaster Master Artist 2	September 22, 2010 – June 22, 2011
Notes: 14 compilation albums; Released by Nippon Columbia
The Idolmaster Animation Master	August 10, 2011 – September 15, 2013
Notes: Two singles, five compilation albums and two limited edition albums; Contains music from the 2011 The Idolmaster anime adaptation; Released by Nippon Columbia
The Idolmaster Perfect Idol	October 27, 2011 - April 26, 2012
Notes: 4 compilation albums; Released by Nippon Columbia; Contains remix versions of music up to and including the 2011 The Idolmaster anime adaptation and the 2014 movie
The Idolmaster Animation Master Namassuka Special	August 15, 2012 – April 10, 2013
Notes: Seven compilation albums; Released by Nippon Columbia
Petit Idolmaster Twelve Seasons!	January 9, 2013 – March 27, 2013
Notes: 12 character song singles; Contains music from the Puchimas! Petit Idolmaster anime series; Released by Frontier Works
The Idolmaster Cinderella Master	April 18, 2012 – ongoing
Notes: 45 singles and 4 EPs so far; Contains music for The Idolmaster Cinderlla Girls; Released by Nippon Columbia
The Idolmaster Live Theater Performance	April 24, 2013 – April 30, 2014
Notes: One single and twelve compilation albums; Character songs for The Idolmaster Million Live!; Released by Lantis
The Idolmaster 765 Pro Allstars+ Greatest Best!	September 18, 2013 – December 18, 2013
Notes: Four compilation albums; Contains music up to and including The Idolmaster Shiny Festa
The Idolmaster Cinderella Master Jewelres!	September 25, 2013 – ongoing
Notes: Six compilation albums so far; Contains music for The Idolmaster Cinderlla Girls; Contains cover songs; Released by Nippon Columbia
Petit Idolmaster Twelve Campaigns!	May 28, 2014 – August 6, 2014
Notes: 6 character song compilation albums; Contains music for the Puchimas! Petit Petit Idolmaster anime series; Released by Frontier Works
The Idolmaster Live Theater Harmony	July 30, 2014 - March 25, 2015
Notes: Ten compilation albums; Character songs for The Idolmaster Million Live!; Released by Lantis
The Idolmaster 9th Anniversary We Are Masterpiece!!	August 2, 2014 - October 5, 2014
Notes: Two limited edition CDs; Contains music from The Idolmaster 2 and The Idolmaster anime adaptation; Sold exclusively at The Idolmaster 9th Anniversary live events
The Idolmaster Master Artist 3	August 27, 2014 – February 17, 2016
Notes: 2 singles and 13 compilation albums; Contains music from The Idolmaster One For All; Released by Nippon Columbia

=== Other releases ===
Title	Release dates
The Idolmaster Your Song	January 18, 2007
Notes: Two-CD set; Cover album; The songs on the album were later released in The Idolmaster Master Artist; Released by Nippon Columbia
"Binetsu S.O.S.!!" (微熱S.O.S!!)	April 25, 2007
Notes: One CD; Contains the opening theme from Idolmaster: Xenoglossia; Released by Lantis
"Yūkyū no Tabibito (Dear boy)" (悠久の旅人～Dear boy)	May 16, 2007
Notes: One CD; Contains the ending theme from Idolmaster: Xenoglossia; Released by Lantis
"Zankoku yo Kibō to Nare" (残酷よ希望となれ)	August 8, 2007
Notes: One CD; Contains the opening theme from Idolmaster: Xenoglossia; Released by Lantis
The Idolmaster Christmas for you!	December 19, 2007
Notes: One CD; Cover album of Christmas songs; Released by Nippon Columbia
Idolmaster: Xenoglossia Best Album	February 6, 2008
Notes: One CD; Contains music from Idolmaster: Xenoglossia; Released by Lantis
The Idolmaster Vacation for you!	July 23, 2008
Notes: One CD; Cover album of songs about vacation and summer; Released by Nippon Columbia
The Idolmaster Best Album: Master of Master	November 19, 2008
Notes: Two CD set; Best of album; Released by Nippon Columbia
The Idolmaster 2 765 Pro Happiness New Year Party!! 2011	January 10, 2011
Notes: Two CD set; Contains solo versions of the original songs from Christmas for You, Vacation for You, Master Special Winter, and Master Special Spring; Released by Nippon Columbia; Sold exclusively at The Idolmaster 2 765 Pro Happiness New Year Party!! 2011 live event
"The World is All One!!"	February 9, 2011
Notes: One CD; Contains music from The Idolmaster 2; Released by Nippon Columbia
"Smoky Thrill"	February 9, 2011
Notes: One CD; Contains music from The Idolmaster 2; Released by Nippon Columbia
The Idolmaster Jupiter	November 23, 2011
Notes: One CD; Compilation album; Contains music form the 961 unit Jupiter; Released by Nippon Columbia
"La♪La♪La♪ Wonderland" (ら♪ら♪ら♪わんだぁらんど)	November 28, 2012
Notes: One CD; Contains the opening theme song from the Puchimas! Petit Idolmaster anime series; Released by Frontier Works
The Idolmaster Masters of Idol World!! 2014	February 22, 2014
Notes: Two CD set; Contains solo versions of the original songs from The Idolmaster Shiny Festa; Released by Nippon Columbia; Sold exclusively at The Idolmaster Masters of Idol World!! 2014 live event
Puchimasu! Kanshsai Special CD	April 18, 2014
Notes: Contains music from the Puchimas! Petit Idolmaster anime series; Sold exclusively at a live event in Kansai
Puchimasu!! Petit Petit Idolmaster Ending Theme Maxi Single	May 28, 2014
Notes: Contains music from the Puchimas! Petit Petit Idolmaster anime series; Released by Frontier Works
The Idolmaster Master of Idol World!! 2014 Special Disc Idol Power Rainbow	October 22, 2014
Notes: One CD; Contains multiple versions of the song "Idol Power Rainbow"; Released by Nippon Columbia; Packaged with The Idolmaster Masters of the Idol World!! 2014 DVD and Blu-ray

== Drama CDs ==
Title	Release dates
The Idolmaster Drama CD	December 22, 2005 – July 21, 2006
Notes: Released by Frontier Works on six CDs
The Idolmaster Drama New Stage	December 22, 2006 – February 25, 2007
Notes: Released by Frontier Works on three CDs
Idolmaster: Xenoglossia Original Drama	June 6, 2007 – November 7, 2007
Notes: Released by Lantis on three CDs
The Idolmaster Eternal Prism	December 25, 2008 – May 13, 2009
Notes: Released by Frontier Works on three CDs and one vocal CD
Puchimas! Petit Idolmaster	April 27, 2011 – November 9, 2011
Notes: Released by Frontier Works on two CDs and one vocal CD

== Print media ==
=== Manga ===
The Idolmaster has been adapted into 26 serialized manga created by one or two authors, as well as several manga anthologies featuring multiple artists. These manga include direct adaptations of the video games and anime adaptations, in addition to spin-offs with original storylines. The various manga have been published since 2005 by ASCII Media Works, Enterbrain, Fox Shuppan, Hakusensha, Ichijinsha, Kadokawa Shoten, Kodansha and Square Enix.

==== Serializations ====
No.	Title	Release date	ISBN
–	The Idolmaster (アイドルマスター)	September 26, 2007	978-4-04-713966-4
Notes: Illustrated by Hinata Yaya; Serialized between May and November 2006 in Kadokawa Shoten's Comp Ace
–	Idolmaster: Xenoglossia (アイドルマスター Xenoglossia)	September 26, 2007	978-4-04-713967-1
Notes: Written by Ryō Suzukaze and illustrated by Mairi Kurosaki; Serialized in Kadokawa Shoten's Comp Ace between February 26, 2007 and January 26, 2008; The manga's remaining chapters were never collected in a tankōbon volume
–	The Idolmaster Your Message (アイドルマスター -Your Mess@ge-)	November 27, 2007	978-4-8402-4132-8
Notes: Illustrated by Rei Kusakabe; Serialized in ASCII Media Works' Side-BN in 2007
1–2	The Idolmaster Relations (アイドルマスター relations)	February 9, 2008 (vol. 1); September 25, 2008 (vol. 2)	978-4-75-806080-6 (regular edition) (vol. 1); ISBN 978-4-7580-6081-3 (limited edition) (vol. 1); ISBN 978-4-75-806107-0 (vol. 2)
Notes: Illustrated by Yumehito Ueda; Serialized between March 2007 and May 2008 in Ichijinsha's Comic Rex
1–4	The Idolmaster Break! (アイドルマスターブレイク!)	March 4, 2009 (vol. 1); October 2, 2009 (vol. 2); June 4, 2010 (vol. 3); March 4, 2011 (vol. 4)	978-4-06-380031-9 (regular edition) (vol. 1); ISBN 978-4-06-362134-1 (limited edition) (vol. 1); ISBN 978-4-06-380071-5 (regular edition) (vol. 2); ISBN 978-4-06-364802-7 (limited edition) (vol. 2); ISBN 978-4-06-380111-8 (regular edition) (vol. 3); ISBN 978-4-06-362163-1 (limited edition) (vol. 3); ISBN 978-4-06-380141-5 (regular edition) (vol. 4); ISBN 978-4-06-364852-2 (limited edition) (vol. 4)
Notes: Illustrated by Takuya Fujima; Serialized between September 2008 and October 2010 in Kodansha's Monthly Shōnen Rival
1–6	Puchimas! Petit Idolmaster (ぷちます! - Petit Idolm@ster -)	November 27, 2009 (vol. 1); August 27, 2010 (vol. 2); July 27, 2011 (vol. 3); October 27, 2012 (vol. 4); March 27, 2013 (vol. 5); March 27, 2014 (vol. 6)	978-4-04-868251-0 (vol. 1); ISBN 978-4-04-868808-6 (vol. 2); ISBN 978-4-04-870701-5 (vol. 3); ISBN 978-4-04-886824-2 (regular edition) (vol. 4); ISBN 978-4-04-886858-7 (special edition) (vol. 4); ISBN 978-4-04-891417-8 (regular edition) (vol. 5); ISBN 978-4-04-891418-5 (limited edition) (vol. 5); ISBN 978-4-04-866187-4 (regular edition) (vol. 6); ISBN 978-4-04-866211-6 (limited edition) (vol. 6)
Notes: Illustrated by Akane; Serialized in ASCII Media Works' Dengeki Maoh since the September 2008 issue
1–3	The Idolmaster Splash Red for Dearly Stars (アイドルマスター Splash Red for ディアリースターズ)	July 9, 2010 (vol. 1); February 26, 2011 (vol. 2); July 27, 2011 (vol. 3)	978-4-75-806201-5 (vol. 1); ISBN 978-4-75-806237-4 (vol. 2); ISBN 978-4-75-806250-3 (vol. 3)
Notes: Illustrated by Anri Sakano; Serialized in Ichijinsha's Comic Rex between the September 2009 and March 2011 issues
1–3	The Idolmaster Innocent Blue for Dearly Stars (アイドルマスター Innocent Blue for ディアリースターズ)	July 9, 2010 (vol. 1); February 26, 2011 (vol. 2); July 27, 2011 (vol. 3)	978-4-75-806202-2 (vol. 1); ISBN 978-4-75-806238-1 (vol. 2); ISBN 978-4-75-806252-7 (vol. 3)
Notes: Illustrated by Reiichi; Serialized in Ichijinsha's Comic Rex between the September 2009 and March 2011 issues
1–3	The Idolmaster Neue Green for Dearly Stars (アイドルマスター Neue Green for ディアリースターズ)	July 9, 2010 (vol. 1); February 26, 2011 (vol. 2); July 27, 2011 (vol. 3)	978-4-75-806203-9 (vol. 1); ISBN 978-4-75-806239-8 (vol. 2); ISBN 978-4-75-806254-1 (vol. 3)
Notes: Illustrated by Kōsuke Kurose; Serialized in Ichijinsha's Comic Rex between the September 2009 and March 2011 issues
1–3	The Idolmaster 2 Colorful Days (アイドルマスター2 Colorful Days)	October 27, 2011 (vol. 1); October 27, 2012 (vol. 2); March 27, 2013 (vol. 3)	978-4-04-886110-6 (vol. 1); ISBN 978-4-04-891053-8 (vol. 2); ISBN 978-4-04-891465-9 (vol. 3)
Notes: Illustrated by Shū; Serialized in ASCII Media Works' Dengeki Maoh since the April 2011 issue
1–5	The Idolmaster 2 The World is All One!! (アイドルマスター2 The world is all one!!)	November 26, 2011 (vol. 1); October 27, 2012 (vol. 2); March 27, 2013 (vol. 3); October 26, 2013 (vol. 4); April 26, 2014 (vol. 5)	978-4-04-870988-0 (vol. 1); ISBN 978-4-04-886720-7 (vol. 2); ISBN 978-4-04-891355-3 (vol. 3); ISBN 978-4-04-891924-1 (vol. 4); ISBN 978-4-04-866535-3 (vol. 5)
Notes: Illustrated by Yūsuke; Serialized in ASCII Media Works' Dengeki G's Magazine between the April 2011 and May 2014 issues
1–2	The Idolmaster 2 Nemuri-hime (アイドルマスター2 眠り姫)	December 17, 2011 (vol. 1); April 27, 2012 (vol. 2)	978-4-04-886152-6 (regular edition) (vol. 1); ISBN 978-4-04-886153-3 (special edition) (vol. 1); ISBN 978-4-04-886497-8 (vol. 2)
Notes: Illustrated by Kotetsu Akane; Serialized in ASCII Media Works' Dengeki Daioh between the April 2011 and April 2012 issues
–	Jupiter: The Idolmaster	March 19, 2013	978-4-59-219610-5
Notes: Illustrated by Mitsubachi Miyuki; Serialized in Hakusensha's Hana to Yume between 2012 and 2013
–	Days of Jupiter: The Idolmaster	March 19, 2013	978-4-59-219766-9
Notes: Illustrated by Natsumi Asa; Serialized in Hakusensha's Hana to Yume Online between August 24, 2012 and 2013
1–4	The Idolmaster	March 27, 2013 (vol. 1); December 27, 2013 (vol. 2); August 4, 2014 (vol. 3); March 27, 2015 (vol. 4)	978-4-75-806358-6 (regular edition) (vol. 1); ISBN 978-4-75-806359-3 (special edition) (vol. 1); ISBN 978-4-75-806420-0 (vol. 2); ISBN 978-4-75-806463-7 (regular edition) (vol. 3); ISBN 978-4-75-806464-4 (special edition) (vol. 3); ISBN 978-4-75-806494-1 (vol. 4)
Notes: Written by Tatsuya Takahashi and illustrated by Mana; Serialized in Ichijinsha's Comic Rex between the October 2012 and October 2016 issues; This manga is an adaptation of the 2011 anime series The Idolmaster
1–2	The Idolmaster Cinderella Girls New Generations (アイドルマスター シンデレラガールズ ニュージェネレーションズ)	April 25, 2013 (vol. 1); November 25, 2013 (vol. 2)	978-4-75-753903-7 (vol. 1); ISBN 978-4-75-754145-0 (vol. 2)
Notes: Illustrated by Namo; Serialized in Square Enix's Gangan Joker between the October 2012 and November 2013 issues
1	The Idolmaster Cinderella Girls Rockin' Girl (アイドルマスター シンデレラガールズ ロッキングガール)	April 25, 2013	978-4-75-753927-3
Notes: Illustrated by Hamachon; Serialized in Square Enix's Big Gangan since October 25, 2012
1–2	The Idolmaster Cinderella Girls Ensemble! (アイドルマスター シンデレラガールズ あんさんぶる!)	November 25, 2013 (vol. 1); December 25, 2014 (vol. 2)	978-4-75-754144-3 (vol. 1); ISBN 978-4-75-754517-5 (vol. 2)
Notes: Illustrated by Sadoru Chiba with Haruki Kashiba; Serialized in Square Enix's Young Gangan since the November 16, 2012 issue
–	The Idolmaster Cinderella Girls Honjitsu no Idol-san (アイドルマスター シンデレラガールズ 本日のアイドルさん)	November 25, 2013	978-4-75-754146-7
Notes: Illustrated by Saya Kiyoshi; Also includes Kiyoshi's The Idolmaster Cinderella Girls Honjitsu no Dereraji-san (アイドルマスター シンデレラガールズ 本日のデレラジさん); Both series were serialized in Square Enix's Big Gangan between the December 2012 and August 2013 issues
1–3	The Idolmaster Cinderella Girls: Cinderella Girls Theater (アイドルマスターシンデレラガールズ シンデレラガールズ劇場)	January 27, 2015 (vol. 1); April 27, 2015 (vol. 2); September 26, 2015 (vol. 3)	978-4-04-869092-8 (vol. 1); ISBN 978-4-04-869367-7 (vol. 2); ISBN 978-4-04-865351-0 (vol. 3)
Notes: Serialized in The Idolmaster Cinderella Girls video game
1–2	The Idolmaster Million Live! (アイドルマスター ミリオンライブ!)	March 12, 2015 (vol. 1); August 12, 2015 (vol. 2)	978-4-09-125760-4 (regular edition) (vol. 1); ISBN 978-4-09-159203-3 (special edition) (vol. 1); ISBN 978-4-09-126286-8 (regular edition) (vol. 2); ISBN 978-4-09-159213-2 (special edition) (vol. 2)
Notes: Illustrated by Yuki Monji; Serialized in Monthly Shōnen Sunday since the August 2014 issue
1	The Idolmaster Million Live! Backstage (アイドルマスター ミリオンライブ! バックステージ)	June 22, 2015	978-4-75-808233-4 (regular edition) (vol. 1); ISBN 978-4-75-808234-1 (special edition) (vol. 1)
Notes: Illustrated by Mizuki; Serialized in Ichijinsha's Manga 4-Koma Palette since the September 2014 issue
1-5	The Idolmaster Cinderella Girls U149 (アイドルマスター シンデレラガールズ U149)	October 16, 2016	978-4065092040 (regular edition) (vol. 1); ISBN 978-4065092057 (special edition) (vol. 1); ISBN 978-4065092453 (regular edition) (vol. 2); ISBN 978-4065092460 (special edition) (vol. 2); ISBN 978-4065118689 (regular edition) (vol. 3); ISBN 978-4065118696 (special edition) (vol. 3); ISBN 978-4065129432 (regular edition) (vol. 4); ISBN 978-4065129449 (special edition) (vol. 4); ISBN 978-4065163085 (regular edition) (vol. 5); ISBN 978-4065163115 (special edition) (vol. 5)
Notes: Written and illustrated by Kyowno; Serialized in Cygames' Cycomics

Not yet in tankōbon format

- Jupiter-san: The Idolmaster (ジュピターさん 〜The Idolm@ster〜), illustrated by Proton, serialized in Hakusensha's The Hana to Yume since the November 1, 2012 issue.
- The Idolmaster Cinderella Girls Dereraji-san (アイドルマスター シンデレラガールズ デレラジさん), illustrated by Ajiichi, serialized in Square Enix's Gangan Online between September 12, 2013, and February 12, 2015.
- The Idolmaster Cinderella Girls, written by Yuniko Ayana, illustrated by Sō Ueto, serialized in Ichijinsha's Comic Rex between the October 2015 and May 2016 issues.

==== Anthologies ====
No.	Title	Release date	ISBN
1–2	The Idolmaster Comic Anthology (アイドルマスター コミックアンソロジー)	November 25, 2005 (vol. 1); January 25, 2006 (vol. 2)	978-4-75-800281-3 (vol. 1); ISBN 978-4-75-800298-1 (vol. 2)
Notes: Published by Ichijinsha
–	The Idolmaster Anthology Comic (アイドルマスター アンソロジーコミック)	March 10, 2006	978-4-92-514899-3
Notes: Published by Fox Shuppan
1	The Idolmaster Concept Comic On (アイドルマスターコンセプトコミック オン)	March 31, 2006	978-4-75-772688-8
2	The Idolmaster Concept Comic Off (アイドルマスターコンセプトコミック オフ)	March 31, 2006	978-4-75-772689-5
Notes: Published by Enterbrain
1–2	The Idolmaster Cinderella Girls Comic Anthology Cute (アイドルマスター シンデレラガールズ コミックアンソロジー cute)	October 25, 2012 (vol. 1); September 30, 2013 (vol. 2)	978-4-75-800711-5 (vol. 1); ISBN 978-4-75-800777-1 (vol. 2)
Notes: Published by Ichijinsha
1–2	The Idolmaster Cinderella Girls Comic Anthology Cool (アイドルマスター シンデレラガールズ コミックアンソロジー cool)	November 30, 2012 (vol. 1); August 31, 2013 (vol. 2)	978-4-75-800721-4 (vol. 1); ISBN 978-4-75-800766-5 (vol. 2)
Notes: Published by Ichijinsha
1–2	The Idolmaster Cinderella Girls Comic Anthology Passion (アイドルマスター シンデレラガールズ コミックアンソロジー passion)	December 25, 2012 (vol. 1); October 31, 2013 (vol. 2)	978-4-75-800728-3 (vol. 1); ISBN 978-4-75-800778-8 (vol. 2)
Notes: Published by Ichijinsha
–	The Idolmaster Cinderella Girls Shuffle!! (アイドルマスター シンデレラガールズ Shuffle!!)	April 25, 2013	978-4-75-753902-0
Notes: Published by Square Enix; An official anthology serialized in Square Enix's Gangan Online
1–2	The Idolmaster Cinderella Girls Comic Anthology Shine Jewelry! (アイドルマスター シンデレラガールズ コミックアンソロジー)	July 26, 2014 (vol. 1); November 29, 2014 (vol. 2)	978-4-75-800814-3 (vol. 1); ISBN 978-4-75-800840-2 (vol. 2)
Notes: Published by Ichijinsha

=== Novels ===
No.	Title	Release date	ISBN
1	The Idolmaster: Yasuragi no Senritsu (アイドルマスター やすらぎの旋律)	January 30, 2006	978-4-75-772606-2
2	The Idolmaster: Tokimeki no Summer Days (アイドルマスター ときめきのSummer Days)	February 27, 2006	978-4-75-772626-0
Notes: Written by Yūsuke Saitō and illustrated by Otoko; Published by Enterbrain
–	Idolmaster: Xenoglossia Kizuna (アイドルマスター Xenoglossia 絆)	November 20, 2007	978-4-82-911983-9
Notes: Written by Ryō Suzukaze and illustrated by Ein; Serialized in Fujimi Shobo's Dragon Magazine between the July and November 2007 issues
–	Idolmaster: Xenoglossia Iori Sunshine!+ (アイドルマスター Xenoglossia 伊織サンシャイン!+)	March 1, 2008	978-4-89-425674-3
Notes: Written by Ryō Suzukaze and illustrated by Sikorsky; Serialized in Hobby Japan's Charano! between the August 2007 and February 2008 issues

=== Companion books ===
No.	Title	Release date	ISBN
–	The Idolmaster Platinum Album; Aidorumasutā Purachina Arubamu (アイドルマスター プラチナアルバム)	October 28, 2005	978-4-75-772500-3
Notes: Published by Enterbrain; A guide for the arcade version of The Idolmaster
–	The Idolmaster Character Master (The Idolm@ster キャラクターマスター)	December 27, 2005	978-4-75-801046-7
Notes: Published by Ichijinsha; A guide for the arcade version of The Idolmaster
1–4	Weekly The Idolmaster; Shūkan Aidorumasutā (週刊アイドルマスター)	January 26, 2007 – February 16, 2007	978-4-79-734013-6 (vol. 1–4)
Notes: Published by SoftBank Creative; A four-volume series of character fan books for the Xbox 360 version of The Idolmaster
–	The Idolmaster Precious Album (アイドルマスター プレシャスアルバム)	April 11, 2007	978-4-75-773533-0
Notes: Published by Enterbrain; A guide for the Xbox 360 version of The Idolmaster
–	Idolmaster: Xenoglossia Sweet Memories (アイドルマスター Xenoglossia Sweet Memories)	January 28, 2008	978-4-75-801089-4
Notes: Published by Ichijinsha; A guide for Idolmaster: Xenoglossia
–	The Idolmaster Master Book	March 24, 2008	978-4-79-734685-5
Notes: Published by SoftBank Creative; A guide for the Xbox 360 version of The Idolmaster
–	The Idolmaster SP Perfect Sun / Wandering Star / Missing Moon Producer Guide (アイドルマスターSP パーフェクトサン／ワンダリングスター／ミッシングムーン プロデューサーズガイド)	March 28, 2009	978-4-75-774819-4
Notes: Published by Enterbrain; A guide for The Idolmaster SP
–	The Idolmaster Twins Precious Album (アイドルマスター ツインズ プレシャスアルバム)	June 26, 2009	978-4-7577-4977-1
Notes: Published by Enterbrain; A guide for the collection The Idolmaster Twins containing The Idolmaster and The Idolmaster Live For You!
–	The Idolmaster Dearly Stars Delicious Album (アイドルマスター ディアリースターズ デリシャスアルバム)	November 6, 2009	978-4-04-726164-8
Notes: Published by Enterbrain; A guide for The Idolmaster Dearly Stars
–	Annin Dōfu Illustration Works Brilliant Idol; Annindofu Irasuto Wākusu Buririanto Aidoru (杏仁豆腐イラストワークス ブリリアントアイドル)	July 6, 2010	978-4-75-801185-3
Notes: Published by Ichijinsha; Illustration collection for The Idolmaster games; Annin Dōfu is the name of the illustrator
–	The Idolmaster 2 Official Guidebook; Aidorumastā 2 Kōshiki Gaidobukku (アイドルマスター2公式ガイドブック)	March 1, 2011	978-4-09-106473-8
Notes: Published by Shogakukan; A guide for The Idolmaster 2
–	The Idolmaster 2 Precious Album (アイドルマスター2 プレシャスアルバム)	January 25, 2012	978-4-04-727861-5
Notes: Published by Enterbrain; A guide for The Idolmaster 2
1–2	The Idolmaster Visual Collection (The Idolm@ster ビジュアルコレクション)	March 22, 2012 (vol. 1); August 24, 2012 (vol. 2)	978-4-05-405307-6 (vol. 1); ISBN 978-4-05-405367-0 (vol. 2)
Notes: Published by Gakken Marketing; A two-volume illustration collection for the 2011 anime series The Idolmaster
–	The Idolmaster Live in Slot! Perfect Collection	October 12, 2012	978-4-77-781062-8
Notes: Published by Tatsumi Publishing; A guide for the slot machine The Idolmaster Live in Slot!
–	The Idolmaster Anime Fanbook Backstage Master+ (アイドルマスターアニメファンブック Backstage M@ster+)	December 27, 2012	978-4-75-801306-2 (regular edition); ISBN 978-4-75-801307-9 (limited edition)
Notes: Published by Ichijinsha; A guide for the 2011 anime series The Idolmaster
