= Yurina Hase =

Japanese songwriter and voice actress

Yurina Hase (長谷優里奈, Hase Yurina; born December 9, 1979, in Shizuoka Prefecture), formerly Yurika Ochiai (落合祐里香, Ochiai Yurika) and now just Yurika (友利花, Yurika), is a Japanese singer-songwriter and former voice actress and gravure idol. She is also known by her nickname Yurishi (ゆりしー) in Japan.

She originally worked for Arts Vision, but quit in October 2006. From 2007, she worked for Genki Project, but moved to Intercept in December 2008. On December 17, 2009, she went freelance and changed her name to Yurina Hase. In December 2011, Hase began working for Kekke for her voice actor related activities. In 2014, she took a break from voice acting roles.

In June 2020, she recalled how she experienced sexual harassment from a casting couch from anime studio Sunrise.

== Filmography ==
=== Television animation ===
- Uta Kata (2004), Keiko Takamura
- To Heart 2 (2004), Konomi Yuzuhara
- Futakoi (2004), Rara Hinagiku
- Tweeny Witches (2004, 2007), Melissa
- Futakoi Alternative (2005), Rara Hinagiku
- Love Get Chu (2006), Yurika Sasaki
- Makai Senki Disgaea (2006), Thursday
- The Idolmaster Live For You! (OVA) (2008), Yukiho Hagiwara
- Hyakko (2008), Suzume Saotome

=== Video games ===
- The Idolmaster (2005), Yukiho Hagiwara
- Dawn of Mana (2006), Faye
- Growlanser VI: Precarious World (2007), Yurii
- The Idolmaster (2007), Yukiho Hagiwara
- The Idolmaster Live For You! (2008), Yukiho Hagiwara
- The Idolmaster SP (2009), Yukiho Hagiwara
- The Idolmaster Dearly Stars (2009), Yukiho Hagiwara
- Quiz Magic Academy, Aloe

=== Internet radio ===
- Radio To Heart2 (onsen(音泉))
- yurishi･azusa Love Get Chu Miracle Radio(onsen(音泉))
