= The Idolmaster Dearly Stars =

2009 video game

- Cover art featuring (from left to right) Eri Mizutani, Ai Hidaka and Ryō Akizuki
- Developer: Microvision
- Publisher: Namco Bandai Games
- Directors: Toshihiko Kujioka; Yoshimasa Koyama
- Producers: Yōzō Sakagami; Bunkei Tanaka
- Writer: Shōgo Sakamoto
- Series: The Idolmaster
- Platform: Nintendo DS
- Release: JP: September 17, 2009
- Genres: Life simulation, Rhythm
- Modes: Single-player, multiplayer

The Idolmaster Dearly Stars (Note: Japanese: アイドルマスター ディアリースターズ, Hepburn: Aidorumasutā Diarī Sutāzu; officially stylized as THE iDOLM@STER Dearly Stars) is a 2009 life simulation video game developed by Microvision and published by Bandai Namco Games. It was released on September 17, 2009 for the Nintendo DS. The game is a spin-off of The Idolmaster series and its timeline coincides before the events in The Idolmaster 2.

The gameplay in Dearly Stars is similar to previous games in the series, but with new elements and differences to the minigames. The gameplay was adjusted to allow the player the option to quickly play through the game's story, but head director Toshihiko Kujioka also wanted to add in gameplay elements that would add another layer of challenge. The story is told from the perspective of Ai Hidaka, Eri Mizutani and Ryō Akizuki—three prospective pop idols introduced in Dearly Stars as they enter the talent agency 876 Production, and deals with their training on their way to stardom. The player has access to the three idols' different scenarios when playing, and each one involves a branching plot line.

Development for the game began in 2008 as the first game in the franchise's next stage called "2nd Vision". The development team wanted to introduce a new talent agency separate from 765 Production, the main agency in the series, to better suit the details of the story. When developing the game's three idols, two of them were decided to be girls, but Kujioka suggested that the third idol Ryō be male instead. The game features 10 songs the idols perform, later released on several music albums. Three manga adaptations were also published by Ichijinsha. Dearly Stars sold 30,786 copies in its first week of release in Japan, and ranked as the tenth best-selling video game in Japan that week. Reviewers have praised the game, and it has been described as suitable for beginners to The Idolmaster series.

== Gameplay ==
An example of Ai taking a vocal lesson. The top screen shows the ranks for five out of the lesson's six parts. The heads-up display of the bottom screen consists of the number of heart points and the enthusiasm meter in the top-left, and the lesson's overall performance rank on the bottom.

Dearly Stars is a life simulation game in which the player assumes the role of one of three pop idols at a time: Ai Hidaka, Eri Mizutani or Ryō Akizuki. An idol's statistics are divided into three categories: vocal, dance and visual image. As these increase, an idol's overall image level will also increase. The game is largely divided into two modes: a story mode which encompasses normal gameplay, and a separate stage mode for performing songs outside of the story mode. At the start of every in-game week on Monday, the player is shown current popularity trends in vocal, dance and visual image ranked first, second and third in popularity. This gives the player a guide on how to gain popularity by augmenting an idol's statistics via the choice of song they will perform and what costumes they wear during an audition. Also on Monday, the player is first given the option to choose which costume and accessories to wear for performances, and to choose one of the available songs. Each costume, accessory and song have either a vocal, dance or visual attribute. The player can also modify the choreography and camera positioning used during performances at this time.

The player is given the option to check any available messages at the start of every in-game day. This is followed by deciding on the daily schedule for Monday through Saturday from four choices: taking a lesson, doing promotional work, taking an audition, or taking the day off; Sunday is always a day off. The lessons are in the form of three minigames which serve to increase or decrease an idol's statistics in either vocal, dance or visual image. For example, if the vocal lesson is chosen, it will not only increase an idol's vocal statistics, but also decrease an idol's dance and visual statistics. Each lesson is divided into six parts, and the player is given ranked with either a letter grade from A to E or simply a "bad" rank for each part depending on how well the lesson is performed. The lessons become harder over time the better they are performed. The lesson's overall performance is ranked from bad, to normal, good and finally perfect.

The promotional phase of the gameplay mainly deals with the idol conversing with various other characters and doing events, some of which are necessary to progress the game. There are also times when the player is given choices that directly affect the idol. Over the course of a conversation, text progression pauses when the player is given multiple responses to choose from. Depending on which choice is made will effect how well or poorly the communication is received, which results in either bad, normal or good memories. A bad memory will decrease an idol's enthusiasm, which is displayed at certain points throughout gameplay by a horizontal bar in the top-left of the lower screen. An idol's enthusiasm ranges from blue to yellow and finally to red as enthusiasm increases. A normal memory will reward the player with a heart point, used later during auditions. A good memory will reward the player with two heart points and increased enthusiasm. If the player chooses to take the day off, an idol's enthusiasm will automatically increase. Days off also give the idol the chance to either stay at home, or go out into town and meet with other characters. The player can check on days off if there are any presents fans have sent the idols, which contain in-game items.

When taking an audition, a judge evaluates the idol over a 30-second period. The judge's interest level continuously decreases in 10% increments, but this can be increased with another minigame. The heart points obtained up to the audition are used in the minigame as the number of times the player is given to successfully appeal to the judge until all the points are exhausted. For instance, three heart points indicates the player will have three chances to increase a judge's interest level. At the end of the audition, a judge's interest level determines if the idol passes or not. If an idol passes the audition, he or she is chosen to do a televised performance of the song previously chosen. A performance serves to increase an idol's number of fans, which in turn can increase an idol's rank if enough fans have been obtained for a given rank. For example, an idol starts at rank F with below 10,000 fans, and the next level up is a rank E with between 10,001 and 99,999 fans. The ranks continue from D to C, B, A and finally S.

Each of the three scenarios follows a branching plot line with multiple endings, and the story's divergence mainly depends on whether an idol passes or fails an audition, though this is not always the case. Some outcomes, such as failing to pass the first audition, can lead the game to end prematurely and offer an alternate ending to the plot. An audition marks the end of a chapter, after which the story will progress onto the next stage. In the game's stage mode, the player is able to freely customize a stand-alone performance, including options for the song, costume, accessories, choreography and camera positioning. Up to 16 players can participate via Wi-Fi in the stage mode by offering three types of cheers during one player's performance. If the game is played on a Nintendo DS with a camera, such as a Nintendo DSi or a later model, the camera may be used to scan QR codes found online or in magazines to obtain in-game items.

== Plot and characters ==
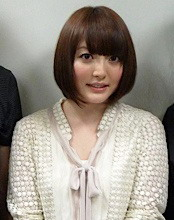
Kana Hanazawa voices Eri Mizutani, one of the idols from 876 Production.

Dearly Stars occurs prior to the events in The Idolmaster 2, and revolves around characters related to the talent agency 876 Production (876 Pro), a rising studio located in a small office. The three main characters are Ai Hidaka, Eri Mizutani and Ryō Akizuki—three prospective pop idols introduced in Dearly Stars. In Ai's story, she is an energetic girl who wants to be an idol like her mother Mai had been, but she becomes discouraged after failing to pass so many idol auditions. One of the judges at her most recent audition was 765 Production's (765 Pro) Haruka Amami, who catches up with Ai in a nearby park and decides to introduce her to 876 Pro. The president of 876 Pro, Minori Ishikawa, immediately hires Ai and wants to promote her as Mai's daughter, but Ai insists on becoming a popular idol on her own.

At the beginning of Eri's story, she is a shy shut-in who has made a name for herself online as an Internet idol under the name "Ellie". This leads to her being contacted by freelance idol producer Reiko Ozaki, who wants to train her as a real-life idol. After they meet, Eri agrees to start work as an idol. Lastly, in Ryō's story, he is a soft-spoken boy who wants to be an idol so he can be seen as a "cool" guy. He consults his cousin and 765 Pro idol Ritsuko Akizuki about it, who introduces him to 876 Pro's manager Manami Okamoto. At 876 Pro, Ryō ends up covering for a female idol, much to his chagrin, and he does so well that the agency decides to hire him, but only if he debuts as a female idol. Ishikawa assures him that once he proves himself as a female idol, that she will help him make the transition into being a legitimate male idol. Manami is the manager for both Ai and Ryō in their respective scenarios. The rest of the story deals with the training Ai, Eri and Ryō go through on their way to stardom.

Two other idols are introduced in Dearly Stars as supporting characters. Eri is friends with Ayane Suzuki, a high-ranking Internet idol known as "Cineria" whom she also chats with online. She is against Eri transitioning into being a real-life idol, and seeks to take her back into being an Internet idol. Ryō's story also involves Yumeko Sakurai, a talented idol and rival to Ryō. Throughout the story, other idols from 765 Pro also make appearances.

== Development and release ==
Dearly Stars was primarily developed by Microvision in conjunction with Bandai Namco Games. The game was directed by Toshihiko Kujioka of Bandai Namco Games and co-directed by Yoshimasa Koyama of Microvision. In 2008, while Bandai Namco Games was in the process of developing The Idolmaster SP and downloadable content for The Idolmaster Live For You!, Kujioka and Bandai Namco Games producer Bunkei Tanaka submitted the proposal for Dearly Stars to Yōzō Sakagami, the main producer for The Idolmaster games. It was announced in May 2009 as the first game in the franchise's next stage called "2nd Vision", which was described as The Idolmaster's next project that would further expand the series' world.

The development team wanted to introduce a new talent agency that would be separate from 765 Pro to better suit the details of the story, such as how the idols at 876 Pro are just starting out while the idols at 765 Pro already have an establish fanbase. Tanaka would go on to say that the scenario in Dearly Stars would not have worked without having a different company president—in this case, the president of 876 Pro, Minori Ishikawa. The gameplay was adjusted to allow the player the option to quickly play through the game's story. However, Kujioka also wanted to add in gameplay elements that would add another layer of challenge, such as the introduction of the choreography panel to make adjustments to an idol's dance sequence or the positioning and manipulation of in-game cameras. The staff also altered how the lessons and auditions operate in Dearly Stars compared to previous games in the series, which also modified the game's degree of difficulty.

When developing the game's three idols, the staff first decided on going with an archetypal "cheerful" girl and "slightly brooding and negative" girl. When thinking about what to do with the last idol, Kujioka suggested having the idol be male instead, and Tanaka thought this would be okay. It was also suggested that one of the 876 Pro idols be related to one of the 765 Pro idols, leading to Ritsuko Akizuki being chosen to be Ryō's cousin. When developing the idols' characters, creating one idol's details resulted in equivalent changes to the other two idols. For instance, this development technique ultimately led to the image color for the idols being decided based on the idols' surnames. The design of the characters was split between two artists: Toshiyuki Kubooka, who had been the character designer since the original arcade version of The Idolmaster, and Kiyotaka Tamiya, who designed the characters introduced in Dearly Stars.

When writing the story, the staff wanted to incorporate Hibiki Ganaha and Takane Shijō, who had already been introduced in The Idolmaster SP, but because the two games were being developed simultaneously, Hibiki's and Takane's role in the main story of Dearly Stars was kept to a minimum. For the dance sequences during performances, Kujioka chose to employ talent star Fumi Sakura, as opposed to professional dancers who had been used in The Idolmaster games up to that point. Kujioka wanted the dance sequences to be closer to what he calls an "idol's aura"—a certain emotional charm that is not a part of an idol's skill at dancing, according to him. Also, because of the idols in Dearly Stars are young and are just starting out, Kujioka told Sakura to purposefully mess up some dance portions to reflect this inexperience.

Despite The Idolmaster originally being targeted at a male audience, there were also advertisements and promotions for Dearly Stars geared towards young girls. Despite this, the game has a CERO rating of C (ages 15 and up) and an additional icon for "sexual" themes. The game was released in Japan on September 17, 2009.

=== Music ===
Dearly Stars features 10 songs the idols perform written and composed by a variety of songwriters. The chief music director Kōji Nakagawa told Satoru Kōsaki, the composer of the game's theme song "Hello!!", that he wanted it to be "similar to the opening theme of an anime." It was decided beforehand who the three composers would be for the other three songs introduced in Dearly Stars—"Alive", "Precog" (プリコグ) and "Dazzling World". When discussing who would compose which song, Go Shiina said he wanted to compose the song for the game's main idol, so he was given in charge of composing Ai's song "Alive". Producer Yōzō Sakagami pointed out that as a ballad, "Alive" does not seem like a typical idol song, but as noted by Nakagawa, the song is meant to reflect the fact that Ai's mother Mai originally sang the song once she became a prominent idol. When recording Ryō's song "Dazzling World" sung by Yuuko Sanpei, Nakagawa decided on the spot to record the song used in the game in two versions: one with a female voice and the other in a male voice. Of the 10 songs in the game, Kujioka specifically wanted to include "Kiramekirari" (キラメキラリ).

The four songs introduced in Dearly Stars were released by Nippon Columbia on a four-part CD series titled The Idolmaster Dream Symphony in 2009. The first release was the single for "Hello!!" on September 9. This was followed by three compilation albums, one for each of the idols: Eri's album was released on October 14, Ryō's album was released on November 4, and Ai's album was released on December 2.

Song list
No.	Title	Lyrics	Music	Image	Length
1.	"Agent Yoru o Yuku" (エージェント夜を往く)	LindaAI-CUE	LindaAI-CUE	Dance	4:11
2.	"Alive"	Mft	Go Shiina	Vocal	6:52
3.	"Dazzling World"	Ryō Watanabe	Ryō Watanabe	Dance	4:30
4.	"Go My Way!!"	Yura	Satoru Kōsaki	Visual	4:51
5.	"Hello!!"	Yura	Satoru Kōsaki	Vocal	4:13
6.	"Kiramekirari" (キラメキラリ)	Yura	Satoru Kōsaki	Dance	4:04
7.	"Precog" (プリコグ)	Fubito Endo	Tetsuya Uchida	Visual	3:39
8.	"Relations"	Mft	Kōji Nakagawa	Dance	4:50
9.	"Shiny Smile"	Matsuri Asahi	Yoshi	Vocal	4:11
10.	"The Idolmaster"	Megumi Nakamura	Hiroto Sasaki	Dance	4:51

== Related media ==
An Internet radio show to promote Dearly Stars titled Dearly Station (ディアリーステーション) broadcast four main episodes and one special episode between July 11 and August 31, 2009 on Niconico's channel Tarukitei. A 176-page guidebook of the game titled The Idolmaster Dearly Stars Delicious Album was released on November 6, 2009 by Enterbrain. The book contains five chapters that detail the plot and characters, gameplay system, data related to in-game items and game mechanics, and interviews from the cast and development staff. Three manga adaptations were serialized in Ichijinsha's Comic Rex between the September 2009 and March 2011 issues. They included: The Idolmaster Splash Red for Dearly Stars illustrated by Anri Sakano which deals with Ai's story, The Idolmaster Innocent Blue for Dearly Stars illustrated by Reiichi which covers Eri's story, and The Idolmaster Neue Green for Dearly Stars illustrated by Kōsuke Kurose which has to do with Ryō's story. Each manga was released in three tankōbon volumes between July 9, 2010 and July 27, 2011. A limited edition of each of the third manga volumes contained a different drama CD.

== Reception ==
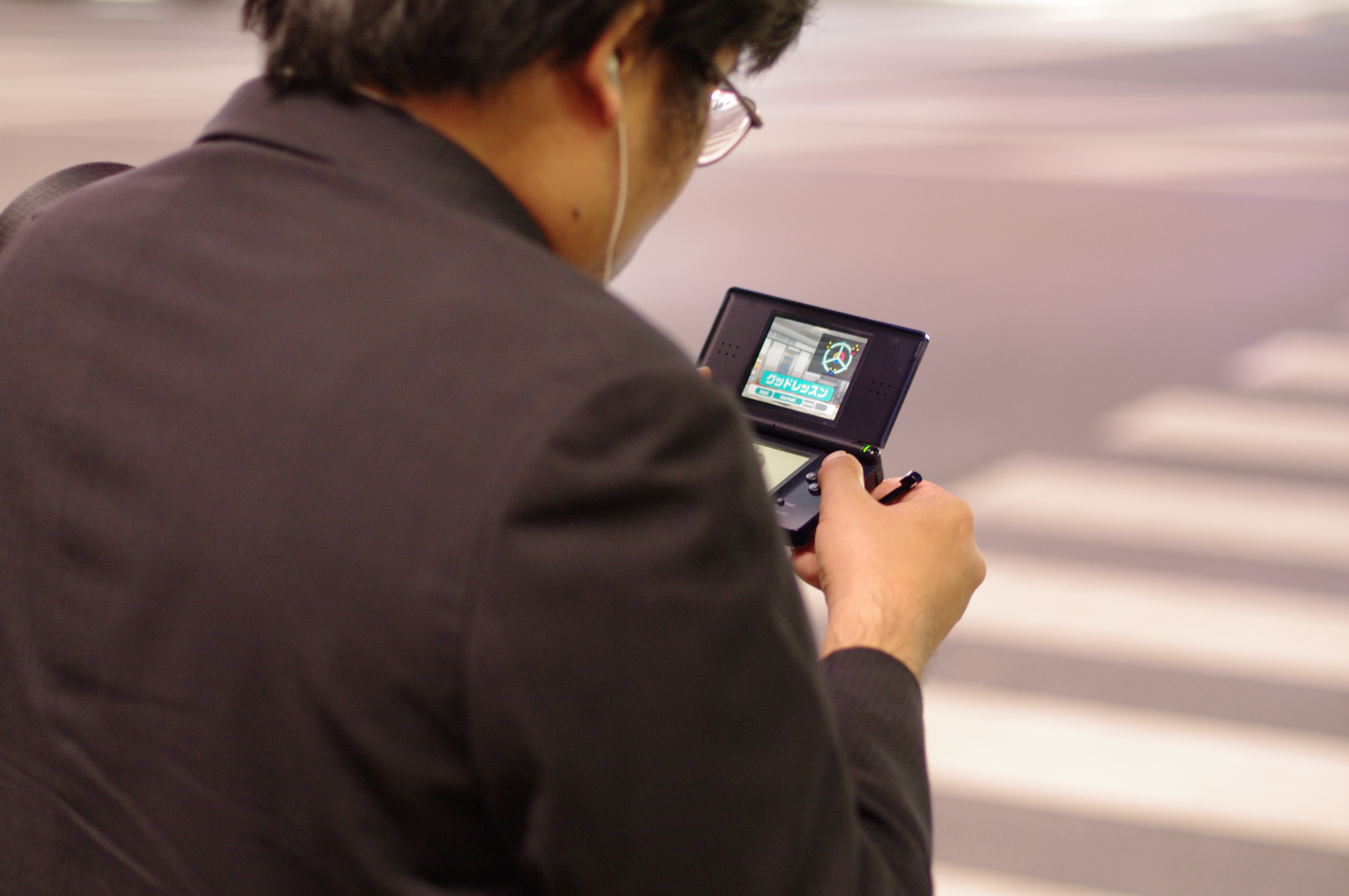
A man playing The Idolmaster Dearly Stars at the crosswalk in front of the Akihabara Radio Center, 2009.

Dearly Stars sold 30,786 copies in its first week of release in Japan, and ranked as the tenth best-selling video game in Japan that week. The game received a score of 30 out of 40 from the Japanese video game magazine Famitsu. Critics have described Dearly Stars as suitable for beginners to the Idolmaster series for drawing out the series' essence and reorganizing it into a simpler and easier-to-understand form. At the same time, Famitsu reviewer Sekai Sandai Miyokawa thinks that fans of the series will feel from Dearly Stars the growth of the 765 Pro idols and the overall growth of the series. Reviewers note that despite the change in the game's details compared to previous games in the series, such as the change in perspective from the producer to the idol, Dearly Stars still plays like an Idolmaster game. However, another Famitsu reviewer stated that because other aspects of the gameplay in Dearly Stars are similar to previous Idolmaster games such as doing lessons and auditions, the sense of enjoyment is not that different from other games. A reviewer for Famitsu felt it was easier to empathize with an idol when the story was told from their perspective.

Despite the technical limitations of the Nintendo DS compared to other games in the series that have been developed for the Xbox 360 and PlayStation Portable, Miyokawa described the movement of the idols during performances as "better than expected," and welcomed shots of the audience waving glow sticks. While another reviewer for 4Gamer could not deny the lower visual quality of the performances compared to previous Idolmaster games, the unexpectedly high sound quality of the songs in combination with well-done dance sequences, albeit on a small screen, was considered by this reviewer as "thoroughly enjoyable." Miyokawa also praised the additional gameplay that goes into minutely adjusting an idol's choreography, but described it as extremely difficult to do well. However, the game's overall degree of difficulty compared to previous Idolmaster games is described as having decreased. The songs introduced in Dearly Stars such as "Hello!!" have been called "wonderful".

The introduction of Ryō as a cross-dressing idol has been praised by one reviewer who called him the cutest out of the three playable idols because of both his appearance and his personality. Miyokawa suggested that Ryō may have been created to lessen any sense of awkwardness that male players would feel from playing as female idols, but upon playing his scenario, Miyokawa noted that the player is naturally able to get into the story, in part due to the comical events surrounding Ryō's story that deal with him cross-dressing.
