= List of The Idolmaster episodes =

The Idolmaster is a 2011 anime series based on the popular raising sim and rhythm game franchise of the same name by Namco Bandai Games on the arcade and Xbox 360. The anime is produced by A-1 Pictures and directed by Atsushi Nishigori, series composition by Atsushi Nishigori and Touko Machida, character design by Atsushi Nishigori, art directed by Kushiro Usui and sound directed by Hiromi Kikuta. Based on The Idolmaster 2, the anime follows a group of thirteen pop idols from 765 Productions Studios and their goal to become the most popular idols in Japan. The anime aired from July 8, 2011, to December 23, 2011, on TBS and on later dates on MBS, CBC, RKB and BS-i. An original video animation episode was released on June 16, 2012.

The anime's first opening theme song for episodes 2 to 12 is "Ready!!" by 765PRO Allstars, the thirteen idols of 765 Productions, sung by their voice actresses, Haruka Amami (Eriko Nakamura), Chihaya Kisaragi (Asami Imai), Yukiho Hagiwara (Azumi Asakura), Yayoi Takatsuki (Mayako Nigo), Ritsuko Akizuki (Naomi Wakabayashi), Azusa Miura (Chiaki Takahashi), Iori Minase (Rie Kugimiya), Makoto Kikuchi (Hiromi Hirata), Ami and Mami Futami (Asami Shimoda), Miki Hoshii (Akiko Hasegawa), Hibiki Ganaha (Manami Numakura) and Takane Shijō (Yumi Hara). For episodes 14 to 19, 21 to 23, 25 and 26, the second opening theme song is "Change!!!!" by 765PRO Allstars. For the ending theme songs, each episode has a different song sung by the idols, including songs from the games.

== Episode list ==
=== The Idolmaster ===
No.	Title	Ending theme	Insert songs	Original release date
1	"This Is Where the Girls Start"; Transliteration: "Kore kara ga Kanojo-tachi no Hajimari" (Japanese: これからが彼女たちのはじまり)	"The World Is All One!!" by 765PRO Allstars	TBA	July 8, 2011
Shown from the perspective of a cameraman shooting a documentary, it films and introduces the girls of 765 Production and their everyday activities as idols. Along with interviews with the staff of 765 Production, the idols themselves are also interviewed over why they became idols and what their goals are. By the end of the episode, 765 Production President Junjirō Takagi reveals to the girls that the cameraman who's been filming them is in fact their new producer.
2	"The Girls Start "Preparing""; Transliteration: ""Junbi" o Hajimeta Shōjo-tachi" (Japanese: "準備"をはじめた少女たち)	"Positive!" by Iori Minase (Rie Kugimiya) & Yayoi Takatsuki (Mayako Nigo)	"Watashi wa Idol♡" (私はアイドル♡) (I'm Idol♡ ) by Iori Minase (Rie Kugimiya), Yayoi Takatsuki (Mayako Nigo) & Ami & Mami Futami (Asami Shimoda)	July 15, 2011
After seeing the girls' current profile pictures, the Producer thinks that they need new ones and orders a re-shoot so the girls can make better impressions in their auditions. When the photo shoot is in session, the younger idols, Iori, Yayoi, Ami and Mami attempt to stand out from the older idols by making themselves look mature, but they end up ruining it. Upon finding out the shenanigans, the Producer, Miki, Azusa and Ritsuko teach the younger girls about individuality and tell them to just be themselves. Thanks to their advice, the girls' photo shoot becomes a success.
3	"Everything Starts With One Courageous Step"; Transliteration: "Subete wa Ippo no Yūki kara" (Japanese: すべては一歩の勇気から)	"First Stage" by Yukiho Hagiwara (Azumi Asakura) & Makoto Kikuchi (Hiromi Hirata)	"ALRIGHT*" by Yukiho Hagiwara (Azumi Asakura)	July 22, 2011
The Producer and the girls head to the town of Furusato to perform a mini concert at the town's Summer Festival. As they get to there, some of the girls become disappointed about the stage's small size. In addition, they have to help out with the festival preparations. Unfortunately for Yukiho, she has a fear of men, which drains her performing confidence. On the night of the town's Summer Festival, Makoto and Haruka manage to help her overcome her fear of men. Yet, she is further hindered by a fear of dogs, just as she was making progress against her androphobia. The Producer counsels Yukiho about the dog by sharing about his own fear of dogs. His courage gives Yukiho the confidence she needs for a great performance with Makoto and Haruka. After everyone returns to the office, the Producer finds a souvenir of Furusato's pickled plums on his desk from Yukiho as a thank-you for helping her.
4	"That Changes Who I Am"; Transliteration: "Jibun o Kaeru to Iu Koto" (Japanese: 自分を変えるということ)	"Aoi Tori (TV Arrange)" (蒼い鳥) (Bluebird) by Chihaya Kisaragi (Asami Imai)	"Otome yo Taishi o Idake!!" (乙女よ大志を抱け!!) (Young Lady Aim High!!) by Haruka Amami (Eriko Nakamura)	July 29, 2011
Haruka, Chihaya, Hibiki and Takane appear on a cable-TV cooking battle show hosted by a frog hand puppet. Before the show begins, Chihaya questions the Producer about the removal of the singing section, only to be told to bear with the change. Simultaneously, he learns about Chihaya's living condition. As the four girls, split into two teams, start cooking, the host pokes fun of the girls' mistakes, especially Haruka and Chihaya, while the cameraman takes video from lewd angles. Chihaya becomes frustrated, expresses displeasure, and shocks the TV studio a little. However, Haruka speaks up and the show resumes as normal. As the show takes a break, Chihaya goes to a quiet area to calm herself with singing. Worried, the Producer finds her, apologizes to her, and makes promises about her getting singing jobs. The other three girls help Chihaya overcome her discomfort, telling her to express herself to the audience, just as though she was singing. With this support, Chihaya improves, and the show concludes successfully. After the show, the Producer rewards the girls with some sweets; but Chihaya declines and goes home. As Chihaya walks on, he recalls Chihaya's sad living situation, realizing his lack of familiarity about the idols.
5	"Spending Summer Vacation With Everyone"; Transliteration: "Minna to Sugosu Natsuyasumi" (Japanese: みんなとすごす夏休み)	"Moony" by Chihaya Kisaragi (Asami Imai), Azusa Miura (Chiaki Takahashi), Makoto Kikuchi (Hiromi Hirata), Miki Hoshii (Akiko Hasegawa), Hibiki Ganaha (Manami Numakura) & Ritsuko Akizuki (Naomi Wakabayashi)	"Kami SUMMER!!" (神SUMMER!!) (Godly SUMMER!!) by Haruka Amami (Eriko Nakamura), Iori Minase (Rie Kugimiya), Ami & Mami Futami (Asami Shimoda), Yukiho Hagiwara (Azumi Asakura), Yayoi Takatsuki (Mayako Nigo), & Takane Shijō (Yumi Hara)	August 5, 2011
It's summer, but the office's air conditioner is broken. So the Producer agrees to bring the girls to the beach for a vacation while the air conditioner is being repaired. As the Producer and the girls enjoy their time, office clerk Kotori Otonashi receives an important call from President Takagi back at the office. Come nightfall, the Producer and the girls stay at a local inn where they enjoy a barbecue, have an outdoor bath, and play games. As everyone goes to sleep, Haruka, Chihaya, Makoto and Iori have some small talk about their vacation and where their careers might be in a year. After the vacation, President Takagi makes an announcement about his approval of Project Ryūgū Komachi, produced by Ritsuko.
6	"The Decision to Continue Forward"; Transliteration: "Saki ni Susumu to Iu Sentaku" (Japanese: 先に進むという選択)	"The Idolmaster" by 765PRO Allstars	"Smoky Thrill" by Ryūgū Komachi (Iori Minase (Rie Kugimiya), Futami Ami (Asami Shimoda), & Azusa Miura (Chiaki Takahashi))	August 12, 2011
Ritsuko's idol unit, Ryūgū Komachi, with Azusa, Iori and Ami as its members, becomes popular after their debut and gets booked in many gigs, including singing on a music television program. Worried over the other idols, the Producer decides to have each of them audition for several gigs. However, he is so worried over having the girls attend their scheduled gigs that some of the girls are forced to rest for various reasons. To make matters worse, he accidentally double-books Hibiki to a concert with Makoto when Hibiki is actually with him and Haruka at another event. Luckily, Miki is available and offers to replace Hibiki at the concert. The Producer realizes his mistakes in panicking over the girls' state and apologizes to Kotori and the girls. As everyone at 765 Production watches Ryūgū Komachi's performance on television, the Producer tells Ritsuko that he will do better to help the idols.
7	"Things You Love, Things That Are Important"; Transliteration: "Daisuki na Mono, Taisetsu na Mono" (Japanese: 大好きなもの、大切なもの)	"Ohayō!! Asa Gohan" (おはよう！！朝ご飯) (Good Morning!! Breakfast) by Yayoi Takatsuki (Mayako Nigo)	"Kiramekirari" (キラメキラリ) (Spark Sparkle) by Yayoi Takatsuki (Mayako Nigo)	August 19, 2011
Iori humiliates herself on a TV show taped at the Minase estate by making the interviewer focus on her when he wants her to talk about her father and brothers. The Producer reprimands her actions, but Iori ignores his advice. Yayoi invites Iori and Hibiki to her home for dinner with her five younger siblings, where Iori learns about the life of a "commoner" and gets to know Yayoi's brother and the eldest boy, Chōsuke, who wants to help his sister. During dinner, Chōsuke hits his brother Kōji for trying to take his food, and as Yayoi tells him to apologize, he snaps at her and runs away. Worried about Chōsuke, Yayoi and Hibiki begin searching for him around the town. The Producer later intervenes after Iori calls him. Iori finds Chōsuke in the storage shed as she remembers that the place is just like where she usually hid when she fought with her brothers. She now understands what it feels like to have a younger sibling and that Chōsuke just wanted to help his sister, and she advises him that instead of just complaining and running away, he should be bold, confront his sister, and tell the truth. Inspired by Iori's speech, Chōsuke reunites with Yayoi and apologizes. As the Producer, Hibiki and Iori go home, he thanks Iori for calling him for help. The next morning, Yayoi finds out, much to her surprise, that Chōsuke wants to become more reliable at home.
8	"The Indirect Route to Happiness"; Transliteration: "Shiawase e no Mawarimichi" (Japanese: しあわせへの回り道)	"Hanikami! Fāsuto Baito" (ハニカミ！ファーストバイト) (Shyness! First Bite) by Iori Minase (Rie Kugimiya), Azusa Miura (Chiaki Takahashi) and Ami Futami (Asami Shimoda)	"Hare Iro" (晴れ色) (Sunny Colour) by Azusa Miura (Chiaki Takahashi) "Agent Yoru o Yuku" (エージェント夜を往く) (Agent That Passes Through The Night) by Makoto Kikuchi (Hiromi Hirata) "Meisō Mind" (迷走Mind) (Straying Mind) by Makoto Kikuchi (Hiromi Hirata) "shiny smile (REM@STER-A)" by Azusa Miura (Chiaki Takahashi) & Makoto Kikuchi (Hiromi Hirata)	August 26, 2011
Azusa, Makoto and Miki go modeling as a bride, groom and bridesmaid, respectively, for a wedding magazine at a chapel. When Azusa is having a chat with her friend on the phone, a runaway bride bumps into Azusa and drops her engagement ring. Azusa picks it up and is then taken by a group of bodyguards who mistake her for the runaway bride. But Azusa's kidnapping is witnessed by Makoto, so she and the Producer chase them, leaving Miki behind at the job. When the bodyguards realize they have the wrong person, they let Azusa go, but later learn from the bride that the ring is with Azusa. As Azusa tries to find her way back, she helps several people along the way, including watching over a fortune teller's booth, and while doing that, directing a well-dressed man to the harbor. After a fight between Makoto and the bodyguards in Yokohama Chinatown, they soon realize where Azusa is and immediately go after her, with the whole group expanding to include the Producer, the bride, the shop owners whose shops were damaged in the fight, and the people Azusa helped. Coincidentally, Miki and the photo crew have moved to where Azusa and everyone else are heading, and Miki convinces the photographer to take pictures of the wild chase. After the misunderstandings are cleared and the ring is finally returned, the bodyguards' boss, the same man Azusa met earlier, arrives, revealing himself to be a Middle Eastern oil tycoon. The bride, finally seeing that the groom is actually a handsome and kind man, happily agrees to marry him and hopes Azusa will find happiness as well. Thankfully for everyone at 765 Production, Azusa's chase photos have become a hit and the oil tycoon has paid for all of the damages caused by misunderstandings.
9	"Things You Can Do As Two"; Transliteration: "Futari da kara Dekiru Koto" (Japanese: ふたりだから出来ること)	"Reimei Sutārain" (黎明スターライン) (Dawning Starline) by Ami & Mami Futami (Asami Shimoda)	TBA	September 2, 2011
After finishing filming a TV mystery mini-drama, Ryūgū Komachi and Ritsuko return to the 765 Production office for a break with Mami and the Producer returning as well. Iori promises to treat everyone to some special puddings she had bought earlier, only to find the puddings gone from the refrigerator. Suspecting the other idols as the culprits, Ami and Mami decide to solve the mystery by playing detectives. As the twins investigate and interrogate the others with their antics, Mami admits to the Producer she feels bored and lonely without her sister but hopes to be famous like Ami and be together again. After clearing almost everyone as suspects, the twins have everyone in the office pull a scary stunt on Haruka, Chihaya and Miki, which reveals Miki as the real culprit. With the case over, Miki explains she ate the pudding because someone ate her jelly dessert earlier that morning. The twins inadvertently reveal they were the ones who ate it, much to everyone's chagrin as the whole thing was their fault in the first place. Makoto also mentions noticing other things going missing from the 'fridge lately, which angers everyone else even further, and everyone begins chasing the twins. In the epilogue, Miki reveals there was only one pudding in the fridge when she ate it as, unknown to everyone, it was Azusa who actually ate all of the puddings that morning despite being on a diet.
10	"Moving Forward a little bit, with Everyone"; Transliteration: "Minna de, Sukoshi demo Mae e" (Japanese: みんなで、少しでも前へ)	"Go My Way!!" by 765PRO & 876PRO All Stars	"LOBM" by 765PRO All Stars "Alice or Guilty" by Jupiter (Toma Amagase (Takuma Terashima), Hokuto Ijuin (Daichi Kanbara), & Shota Mitarai (Yoshitsugu Matsuoka))	September 9, 2011
The girls attend "The Big Talent Agency Sports Competition" where idols groups from various agencies compete in games. Despite the animosity between Makoto and Iori and not all of them winning the first place, the girls remain optimistic, and gain favorable views from the crowd. However, rival idol group Shinkan Shōjo does not like the attention 765 Production is having and proceeds to insult them. One of them even calls Yayoi a burden to the agency, which deeply affects her confidence. After the girls watch a performance by boy band Jupiter, and later lunch with Ai Hidaka, Eri Mizutani and Ryō Akizuki, the idols from 876 Production Studios, Makoto and Iori compete in another three-legged race. Much to their displeasure, during the race, due to their lack of teamwork, Makoto injures her knee. At first, the girls decide that Makoto should pull out of the competition, but as they learn what Shinkan Shōjo said to Yayoi, the girls are now more determined to win the next and final event, the relay race. Their determination emboldens the Producer, who refuses to be intimidated by Shinkan Shōjo's manager trying to pressure 765PRO to lose on purpose so that his idol unit will win the competition. The latter is forced to back off and play fair after Iori reminds him that her family is the major stockholder for the parent company that owns Shinkan Shōjo's agency. As the girls work together in the race and Yayoi regains confidence, Makoto is able to win the first place. At the conclusion of the games, Ryūgū Komachi wins the Idol category, but decide to share their trophy with the rest of the girls of 765 Production, which they celebrate back at their office together with the idols of 876 Production.
11	"Hopes, Uncertainties and Signs"; Transliteration: "Kitai, Fuan, Soshite Yochō" (Japanese: 期待、不安、そして予兆)	"Start!!" by Haruka Amami (Eriko Nakamura)	"Waratte!" (笑って!) (Smile!) by Haruka Amami (Eriko Nakamura)	September 16, 2011
The Producer informs the girls that their big break has come as they will be performing live at the upcoming 765 Productions Thank-You concert. Despite its main event being Ryūgū Komachi, the girls are excited since they will be performing a new song and dance routine. However, the girls have to go through tough dance and vocal lessons, which some of the girls are having problems doing correctly, especially since their exams are coming out. When Yukiho considers quitting for not catching up in dancing, Takane encourages her to not give up and to be more determined. Inspired by Takane, Chihaya decides to help Haruka's vocal training at night and invite her to stay at Chihaya's apartment. While helping Chihaya make dinner, Haruka learns that Chihaya lives alone after her parents' divorce, and Chihaya learns that becoming an idol is Haruka's dream. Thanks to their hard work and determination, the girls finally perfect their singing and dance routine. Due to a misunderstanding between her and the Producer some time ago, Miki believes she is now talented enough to join Ryūgū Komachi, but Ritsuko explains to her why she can't. The next day, the girls are done their exams and are preparing for their next dance lesson, but Miki hasn't arrived yet. As they notice her absence, the Producer receives a message from Miki calling him a liar.
12	"A Goal with a One-Way Path"; Transliteration: "Ippō Tsūkō no Shūchakuten" (Japanese: 一方通行の終着点)	"Shocking na Kare!" (ショッキングな彼!) (Shocking Boyfriend!) by Miki Hoshii (Akiko Hasegawa)	"Furufuru Future☆" (ふるふるフューチャー☆) by Miki Hoshii (Akiko Hasegawa)	September 23, 2011
As the day of the concert gets closer, the Producer and the idols are worrying about Miki, who hasn't come for practice sessions for the past few days. After Ritsuko explains about the talk she had with Miki about the misunderstanding over Ryūgū Komachi, the Producer realizes what happened and tries to call her to come back and to stop being selfish, but Miki tells him she no longer has enthusiasm to perform. Kotori calms the Producer down, explaining that Miki is still a teenager. The Producer regrets treating her like a professional and never considering her feelings. As the Producer searches for Miki around the city, the idols begin to have doubts if Miki will return, but Chihaya, believing Miki will return eventually, convinces others to continue practicing. When the Producer finds Miki, he apologizes to her, but Miki reveals she wants to quit being an idol as she lost her enthusiasm after learning she can't join Ryūgū Komachi. As the Producer follows her around the city trying to make her reconsider, they stop at a lake where she reveals she worked hard during the practice sessions hoping to join Ryūgū Komachi so she could wear cool costumes, be on stage and popular just like them. But the Producer tells her things have changed since now it's the rest of other idols' turn to be in the spotlight, so he promises her that he will help her become just like or better than Ryūgū Komachi if she promises to return to 765 Production with the same enthusiasm she had. Back at the office, Miki apologizes to everyone for her absence, but Chihaya has no time to hear it as she wants Miki to make up for lost time. Glad to have her back, the idols watch Miki try on her new costume.
13	"And so, the Girls Rise to the Shining Stage"; Transliteration: "Soshite, Kanojo-tachi wa Kirameku Sutēji e" (Japanese: そして、彼女たちはきらめくステージへ)	"i" by 765PRO All Stars	"The Idolmaster" by Haruka Amami (Eriko Nakamura), Miki Hoshii (Akiko Hasegawa), Chihaya Kisaragi (Asami Imai), Yayoi Takatsuki (Mayako Nigo), Yukiho Hagiwara (Azumi Asakura), Makoto Kikuchi (Hiromi Hirata), Mami Futami (Asami Shimoda), Takane Shijō (Yumi Hara) & Hibiki Ganaha (Manami Numakura) "Otome yo Taishi o Idake!!" (乙女よ大志を抱け!!) (Young Lady Aim High!!) by Haruka Amami (Eriko Nakamura) "Kiramekirari" (キラメキラリ) (Spark Sparkle) by Yayoi Takatsuki (Mayako Nigo) & Mami Futami (Asami Shimoda) "My Best Friend" by Haruka Amami (Eriko Nakamura) & Chihaya Kisaragi (Asami Imai) "Watashi wa Idol♡" (私はアイドル♡) (I'm Idol♡ ) by Miki Hoshii (Akiko Hasegawa) "Star to Star" (スタ→トスタ→) ("Start Star") by Mami Futami (Asami Shimoda) "Omoide o Arigatou" (思い出をありがとう) (Thank you for the Memories) by Yukiho Hagiwara (Azumi Asakura) & Makoto Kikuchi (Hiromi Hirata) "Next Life" by Hibiki Ganaha (Manami Numakura) "Flower Girl" (フラワーガール) (Flower Girl) by Takane Shijō (Yumi Hara) "Day of the Future" by Miki Hoshii (Akiko Hasegawa) "Marionette no Kokoro" (マリオネットの心) (Heart of the Marionette) by Miki Hoshii (Akiko Hasegawa) "Me ga Au Toki" (目が逢う瞬間) (When Our Eyes Meet ) by Chihaya Kisaragi (Asami Imai) "Jibun REST@RT" (自分REST@RT) (REST@RT YOURSELF) by Haruka Amami (Eriko Nakamura), Miki Hoshii (Akiko Hasegawa), Chihaya Kisaragi (Asami Imai), Yayoi Takatsuki (Mayako Nigo), Yukiho Hagiwara (Azumi Asakura), Makoto Kikuchi (Hiromi Hirata), Mami Futami (Asami Shimoda), Takane Shijō (Yumi Hara), & Hibiki Ganaha (Manami Numakura)	September 30, 2011
It's the day of the 765 Productions Thank-You concert, but complications arise for Ritsuko and Ryūgū Komachi when a typhoon hits the city. All transit operations have been suspended, forcing Ritsuko and the others to drive to the concert, only to get into a traffic jam. With the audience already having arrived at the concert, the Producer issues a change of plans to the backstage crew and the idols to have them perform first to buy enough time for Ryūgū Komachi to arrive. The concert goes well until the audience starts to feel bored and wonders where Ryūgū Komachi are, causing some of the idols to panic while standing backstage. Haruka calms them and tells them to pump up the audience. However, a problem arises when the Producer learns that he has mistakenly ordered for Miki to perform two consecutive songs, both requiring intensive dance performances. Despite how strenuous it will be doing two songs without rest, Miki is determined to do it. The exhausted Miki succeeds in performing both songs amazingly, and the Producer, Chihaya and Haruka praise her. With one last song, the song they have been practicing, the idols give it their all, exciting the crowd and pumping them up for Ryūgū Komachi, who have finally arrived at the concert. When the show ends, Ritsuko, Ami, Azusa and Iori go backstage to see the others, only to find them sleeping out of exhaustion as the Producer, President Takagi and Kotori watch over them. Despite this, they congratulate their friends on a great job.
14	"The World that Began to Change!"; Transliteration: "Kawarihajimeta Sekai!" (Japanese: 変わり始めた世界!)	"Colorful Days" by Haruka Amami (Eriko Nakamura), Miki Hoshii (Akiko Hasegawa), Chihaya Kisaragi (Asami Imai), Ami and Mami Futami (Asami Shimoda), Takane Shijō (Yumi Hara) & Hibiki Ganaha (Manami Numakura)	"Kimi wa Melody" (キミはメロディ) (You're Melody) by Yayoi Takatsuki (Mayako Nigo), Azusa Miura (Chiaki Takahashi), Makoto Kikuchi (Hiromi Hirata), Yukiho Hagiwara (Azumi Asakura), Iori Minase (Rie Kugimiya), Ritsuko Akizuki (Naomi Wakbayashi)	October 7, 2011
Ever since the concert and an article by Yoshizawa, a famous reporter and a good friend of President Takagi, the idols have become very popular to the point of having to wear disguises in public. After appearing on a TV show and going back to their makeup room, Haruka and Yayoi encounter a member of Jupiter, Tōma Amagase, who gives them an ominous warning. Back at the office, everyone is waiting for a magazine, expecting to see a photo shoot of the idols on the cover, but as Iori brings it, the magazine shows instead Jupiter on the cover. Wanting to know what's going on, Junjirō and Yoshizawa believe this was the work of the President of 961 Production and Jupiter's manager, Takao Kuroi, who used his connections to have the magazine cover changed. It is later revealed that Kuroi and Junjirō were once friends in the music industry, but they had a falling out because Junjirō disapproved of Kuroi's methods. Jealous of the 765PRO idols' recent popularity, Kuroi wants revenge on Junjirō by sabotaging his idols using any means necessary. The girls are irritated and attempt to confront Kuroi, but the Producer, Ritsuko and Junjirō tell them they should not fight dirty nor stoop as low as Kuroi does, and if they wish to beat him, they should do it fair and square. As the idols are still upset over the magazine cover, Haruka helps Kotori arrange their fan letters. Thanks to the encouraging letters from their fans, the idols realize it is their fans that they should be winning over, rather than their rivalry with 961 Production and all of them agree to work hard for them.
15	"Everyone Together, It's a Live Broadcast! A Live Broadcast!"; Transliteration: "Minna Sorotte, Namahōsō desu yo Namahōsō!" (Japanese: みんな揃って、生放送ですよ生放送!)	"Megare!" by 765PRO All Stars	"Smile Taiso" (スマイル体操) (Smile Exercises) by Yayoi Takatsuki (Mayako Nigo) "arcadia" by Chihaya Kisaragi (Asami Imai)	October 14, 2011
The 765 Production idols star in a comedy/variety show called "Are We Live? Sunday", hosted by Haruka, Chihaya and Miki. Other segments on the show include Hibiki's challenge of running to reach the TV studio in time, Azusa, Yayoi and Iori with kindergarteners, Yukiho helping Makoto trying on clothes, Takane going out tasting ramen with Ami and Mami and a trailer of the idols' upcoming action mecha movie. But humorous situations arise when Haruka accidentally smacks herself on the face just as she opens an ice cream box, forcing Chihaya to hold her laughter. On the other segments, Miki is trying to flirt with the Producer much to his and Ritsuko's chagrin, Yukiho forces the helpless Makoto to try on male clothes, Yayoi messes up the weather report, Ami and Mami are unable to finish the ramen Takane ordered, and Hibiki gets lost as she is desperate to find a way to the studio. By the end of the show, it's revealed Kotori was watching it at her home.
16	"How It Feels to be All Alone"; Transliteration: "Hitoribotchi no Kimochi" (Japanese: ひとりぼっちの気持ち)	"Brand New Day!" by Hibiki Ganaha (Manami Numakura)	"TRIAL DANCE" by Hibiki Ganaha (Manami Numakura)	October 21, 2011
As Chihaya has nightmares about her past, Hibiki has an argument with her dog, Inumi, even though both of them have been booked to host an animal documentary show. Meanwhile, Kuroi plots to foil Hibiki's role as the presenter of the show by replacing Inumi's role with a less well-behaved dog. As Jupiter are brought on as guests to the show, one of Kuroi's henchmen arranges for Hibiki to be secretly taken elsewhere and left stranded on the side of a cliff so that hosting duties will be given to Jupiter. The Producer searches for Hibiki while her hamster, Hamuzō, travels to the 765 Production office to get help from Inumi and the other idols. As Hibiki realizes she hasn't been able to spend time with her pets due to her busy lifestyle, Inumi and the other animals arrive to help her. As the Producer discovers Kuroi's role in Hibiki's disappearance, Hibiki and her animal friends arrive in time to film the show, much to Kuroi's anger. Kuroi leaves the place, along with his henchmen. Now having a better understanding with her pets, Hibiki hosts the show with them.
17	"Makoto, A True Prince"; Transliteration: "Makoto, Makoto no Ōji-sama" (Japanese: 真、まことの王子様)	"Chiaringu Retā" (チアリングレター) (Cheering Letter) by Makoto Kikuchi (Hiromi Hirata)	"Jitensha" (自転車) (Bicycle) by Makoto Kikuchi (Hiromi Hirata)	October 28, 2011
Makoto is a hit with female fans due to her handsome and Prince-like looks. Although Makoto appreciates the fame, she wishes fans would admire her as a girl and not a boy. After appearing on talk show along with Jupiter, Makoto almost has a fight with Tōma, who repeats the lies Kuroi told him until the Producer intervenes. Later, Kuroi himself appears, taunting the Producer and Makoto and making fun of the latter's boyish looks. To let out her anger, Makoto goes on a "date" with the Producer at an amusement park, where she reveals that her father raised her like a boy. As such, she never experienced doing things that girls normally do and became an idol to shed her 'tomboy image' and to become a princess. When a group of thugs are seen harassing two girls, Makoto goes to stop them, only to later find out the girls are Makoto's fans. They are thrilled with excitement upon meeting their idol and ignore the thugs. Angry at being ignored, one tries to punch Makoto, but the Producer steps in to block the punch, attracting more attention from more of Makoto's fangirls and forcing the thugs to leave. After recovering from his injuries, the Producer teaches Makoto that her dreams of being a princess are great, but she is also fulling the dreams of her fangirls who wish to meet a prince as well. As a gift, they ride the merry-go-round with the Producer treating her as a princess. Grateful to be able to act like a girl for a day, Makoto tells the Producer she will continue with her Prince image for her fans and hopes one day to meet her Prince Charming, who will finally treat her as the Princess she is.
18	"Lots of, Everything"; Transliteration: "Takusan no, Ippai" (Japanese: たくさんの、いっぱい)	"Mahō o Kakete!" (魔法をかけて！) (Cast Your Magic!) by Ritsuko Akizuki (Naomi Wakabayashi)	"Nanairo Botan" (七彩ボタン) (Rainbow Button) by Ryūgū Komachi (Iori Minase (Rie Kugimiya), Futami Ami (Asami Shimoda), & Azusa Miura (Chiaki Takahashi)) "Ippai Ippai" (いっぱいいっぱい) (Lots and Lots) by Ritsuko Akizuki (Naomi Wakabayashi)	November 4, 2011
Ritsuko imposes an intense dancing routine on Ryūgū Komachi to prepare them for an upcoming secret concert, much to the group's displeasure. While checking out Ryūgū Komachi's fan letters, the Producer finds one with a picture of Ritsuko when she was an idol, sent by a fan of hers with the nickname "Petit Bellpepper", much to her embarrassment. Upon learning Azusa won't be able to perform due to mumps, Iori and Ami come up with the idea of having Ritsuko take Azusa's place in the concert, since she's the only one who knows the song and dance routine. As the Producer and Miki support the idea, Ritsuko reluctantly attends dance training with Iori and Ami, allowing them to take advantage of it and get back at her. On the day of the concert, Ritsuko gets stage fright and feels very nervous until Iori and Ami show a prerecorded message by Azusa to the crowd, where the group thanks Ritsuko for being their producer. There is also a surprise appearance by "Petit Bellpepper" himself, alongside Ritsuko's fanclub members who have come to watch, thanks to the Producer. With her stage fright gone, Ristuko is able to perform with Iori and Ami. After the concert, Ritsuko realizes how much has changed since she quit being an idol to form Ryūgū Komachi, but she still wants to be a producer to lead Ryūgū Komachi to the top. However, she does tell the Producer if she ever does a comeback as an idol, she wants him to be her producer. Now with Azusa back, Ritsuko continues the group's regular training for their rise to the top.
19	"Like the Moon Hiding Between the Clouds"; Transliteration: "Kumoma ni Kakureru Tsuki no Gotoku" (Japanese: 雲間に隠れる月の如く)	"Kazahana" (風花) (Wind Flower) by Takane Shijō (Yumi Hara)	"Flower Girl" (フラワーガール) (Flower Girl) by Takane Shijō (Yumi Hara)	November 11, 2011
Kuroi hires a paparazzo to follow and take pictures of Takane in an attempt to expose secrets about her, since her background is a complete mystery, even to everyone at 765 Production. By coincidence, Takane stumbles upon the owner of Elder Records, who treats her for lunch while the paparazzo takes pictures of the two. Out of those pictures, news about Takane transferring to Elder Records spread through. The Producer and Takane explain to the girls that the story is untrue, much to their relief, and opt to not comment about it until the owner of Elder Records returns overseas to clarify to the public about the rumors. However, the girls become suspicious of Takane's behavior and try to keep an eye on her. At a festival, Chihaya admits to Takane that the girls have been following her just because they don't know anything about her. Takane understands, reminding them that everyone has secrets to keep for themselves, just like Chihaya herself. At the 961 Production office, Tōma finally learns of the dirty tricks that Kuroi has been using against 765 Production, while the latter takes an interest of a picture of Chihaya visiting a grave and arguing with her mother. At an event where Takane becomes Police Chief for a day, Takane and the Producer successfully arrest the rogue paparazzo, after which the owner of Elder Records comes to apologize to Takane for the misunderstanding, putting an end to the transfer rumors. As 765 Production celebrate, Takane explains to everyone that her suspicious behavior was because she felt someone (the aforementioned paparazzo) was following her. Meanwhile, Chihaya is shocked to find an exposé about her past in a magazine, causing her to lose her voice in a rehearsal.
20	"Promise"; Transliteration: "Yakusoku" (Japanese: 約束)	"Yakusoku" (約束) (Promise) by Chihaya Kisaragi (Asami Imai), Haruka Amami (Eriko Nakamura), Miki Hoshii (Akiko Hasegawa), Yayoi Takatsuki (Mayako Nigo), Yukiho Hagiwara (Azumi Asakura), Makoto Kikuchi (Hiromi Hirata), Ami and Mami Futami (Asami Shimoda), Iori Minase (Rie Kugimiya), Azusa Miura (Chiaki Takahashi), Takane Shijō (Yumi Hara) and Hibiki Ganaha (Manami Numakura)	TBA	November 18, 2011
Thanks to Kuroi, Chihaya's tragic past is revealed in a magazine. In that magazine issue, it's revealed that Chihaya used to have a younger brother named Yū, who died in a car accident when she was eight. But the magazine article slanders her, suggesting a shocked Chihaya, who was there, did nothing and was heartless, and was also responsible for her parents' divorce. Chihaya reveals to Haruka that she became an idol to sing in memory of her late brother who loved her singing, but because of the revelation of her past, Chihaya is so traumatized that if she is unable to sing, she will stop being an idol. As the days pass, Chihaya refuses to leave her apartment, much to everyone's worries. Haruka tries her best to help Chihaya by paying a visit to her, only to be scolded for being a busybody. After receiving Yū's sketchbook from Chihaya's mother, Haruka asks the Producer if she's just a bother for trying to help everyone, but he assures her that she isn't, as it was her enthusiasm that helped him when he was down. After reading Yū's sketchbook, Haruka and Miki decide to help Chihaya. Everyone at 765 Pro writes and send a song for Chihaya about what their feelings to her, hoping she would sing it at the upcoming 765 Production's Autumn concert. From Yū's sketchbook, Haruka finds out that what made Yū happy wasn't Chihaya's singing, but seeing her smile. On the day of the Autumn concert, just when everyone is afraid Chihaya won't make it for her part, Chihaya finally arrives. As the music to her song begins, Chihaya is still unable to sing until Haruka and the rest of the idols sing the song for her. With their help and seeing her past self and little brother, Chihaya is finally able to overcome her trauma and finish the song herself. As the crowd applaud her, everyone weeps with Chihaya in celebration.
21	"Like a Flower Blooming"; Transliteration: "Maru de Hana ga Saku yō ni" (Japanese: まるで花が咲くように)	"Sora" (空) (Sky) by Kotori Otonashi (Juri Takita)	"Koi o Hajimeyou" (恋をはじめよう) (Let's Start a New Love) by Jupiter (Takuma Terashima, Daichi Kanbara, & Yoshitsugu Matsuoka) "Nemuri Hime" (眠り姫) (Sleeping Beauty) by Chihaya Kisaragi (Asami Imai) "Hana (NEW MIX)" (花(NEW MIX)) (Flower) by Kotori Otonashi (Juri Takita)	November 25, 2011
Thanks to a magazine interview by Yoshizawa with Chihaya over her past, the rumors about her have ended as she and the other idols prepare for the Idol Jam concert with Jupiter performing as well. However, Kuroi is up to no good again, fixing the concert against 765 Production by tricking their hair and makeup stylists into not coming and forcing the sound technician to not play their music and to lie to them saying their music files have been corrupted. Despite this, the Producer goes with the sound technician with a backup file, and the girls decide to do make up themselves while planning an impromptu session before Chihaya goes on stage. As Chihaya thanks her friends for looking after her, she asks them to let her sing her song a cappella. With the crowd praising her performance, the sound technician decides to not give in to Kuroi and play her music. Tōma, who is also seen watching, later finds out that Kuroi had tried to sabotage Chihaya's performance, and proceeds to confront Kuroi. Having enough of Kuroi's dirty tactics and how he treats everyone as pawns, Tōma declares that Jupiter wants nothing to do with 961 Production anymore. After the concert, the Producer meets Jupiter, and Tōma apologizes to the Producer for his past behavior and tells him that Jupiter has quit 961 Production. To celebrate, Junjirō takes everyone out to a restaurant. At the restaurant, much to everyone's surprise, not only are Yoshizawa and Kuroi sitting at the bar, but Kotori is also seen singing to the customers, revealing she was once an idol under Junjirō and Kuroi. As Junjirō has a drink with Yoshizawa and Kuroi while talking about their past, Kuroi leaves. Yoshizawa and Junjirō comment that Kuroi is someone who can't express his feelings well. As everyone heads home, the girls comment on how wonderful Kotori's song was and wonder if she ever had her own dreams of continuing as an idol. Kotori tells the Producer and Ritsuko that she's simply happy just singing every once in a while and watching the others become top idols.
22	"On Christmas Eve"; Transliteration: "Seiya no Yoru ni" (Japanese: 聖夜の夜に)	"Happy Christmas" by Haruka Amami (Eriko Nakamura), Chihaya Kisaragi (Asami Imai), Ami and Mami Futami (Asami Shimoda), Azusa Miura (Chiaki Takahashi), Takane Shijō (Yumi Hara) and Hibiki Ganaha (Manami Numakura)	"inferno" by Chihaya Kisaragi (Asami Imai) "relations" by Miki Hoshii (Akiko Hasegawa) "My Wish" by Miki Hoshii (Akiko Hasegawa), Yayoi Takatsuki (Mayako Nigo), Yukiho Hagiwara (Azumi Asakura), Makoto Kikuchi (Hiromi Hirata), Iori Minase (Rie Kugimiya), & Ritsuko Akizuki (Naomi Wakabayashi) "Attaka na Yuki" (あったかな雪) (Warm Snow) by Miki Hoshii (Akiko Hasegawa), Yayoi Takatsuki (Mayako Nigo), & Ami and Mami Futami (Asami Shimoda)	December 2, 2011
It is the Christmas season and Haruka wants to celebrate a Christmas Eve party with everyone at 765 Productions, just like last year. But with the idols' new fame, all of the girls are busy attending and performing at TV shows, variety shows, holiday or Christmas specials on Christmas Eve, and most of them might not make it in time. Nevertheless, the Producer assures Haruka that he will try his best to get everyone for the party. During her dancing sessions, Haruka learns from the Producer that he has managed to get both her and Miki audition for the musical Spring Storm for the lead role. On Christmas Eve and finishing her work, Haruka accepts not everyone can make it for the party and decides to make the best of it. After buying a cake and a Christmas gift for the Producer, Haruka arrives at the 765 Production office with Chihaya and, much to their surprise, some of the idols have managed to make it for the party since the Producer rescheduled their gigs. With the Producer and Miki being the last to arrive, everyone eats the cakes they all bought and celebrates Christmas, as well as Yukiho's birthday. Junjirō announces to everyone that he has just received a call that Miki has won the Shining Idol New Artist Award. As the party continues, Haruka has a talk with Makoto, Iori and Chihaya on how their careers have changed and that they might not be able to celebrate together like this again, but Chihaya and Haruka are still hopeful that all of them can still celebrate Christmas together.
23	"I"; Transliteration: "Watashi" (Japanese: 私)	"Mitsumete (instrumental)" (見つめて (instrumental)) (Looking)	"Nanairo Botan" (七彩ボタン) (Rainbow Button) by Ryūgū Komachi (Iori Minase (Rie Kugimiya), Futami Ami (Asami Shimoda), & Azusa Miura (Chiaki Takahashi)) "i" by 765PRO All Stars "Little Match Girl" by Yukiho Hagiwara (Azumi Asakura)	December 9, 2011
Haruka is looking forward to a dance rehearsal with everyone for the upcoming New Year's concert. However, the girls of 765 Production are too busy due to their schedules to do the rehearsal, which Haruka takes in stride. Once Chihaya leaves for an overseas recording, the idols are still unable to attend their rehearsals for the New Year's concert, slowly making Haruka fall into depression as she feels lonely, unable to practice with her friends. Even worse, Are We Live? Sunday has been cancelled to free up the Sunday timeslot for other shows, and Miki begins to treat Haruka as a rival over the lead role for a musical. As Haruka feels down on the second day of the musical audition, the Producer arrives with dorayaki to cheer her up. When the Producer asks Haruka if she has any problem and wants to talk about it, Miki interrupts their talk, causing Haruka to walk away from the Producer and almost fall into a hole on stage. The Producer manages to pull her to safety, only to fall into the hole himself. As the Producer is sent to the emergency room, Junjirō, Ritsuko, Kotori, Miki and Haruka wait solemnly and sadly.
24	"Dream"; Transliteration: "Yume" (Japanese: 夢)	"Massugu" (まっすぐ) (Straight) by 765PRO All Stars	"Honey Heartbeat" by Yayoi Takatsuki (Mayako Nigo), Yukiho Hagiwara (Azumi Asakura), & Makoto Kikuchi (Hiromi Hirata) "Sayonara o Arigatou" (さよならをありがとう) (Thank you for Goodbye) by Haruka Amami (Eriko Nakamura)	December 16, 2011
The Producer manages to survive his accident, but remains hospitalized for a while. As a result, Haruka returns to musical rehearsals to channel her grief into her role and wins the lead from Miki. Desperate to get the idols together, Haruka unsuccessfully tries to convince Ritsuko to reschedule or cancel her current gigs so she can practice for the New Year's concert. Miki overhears this and berates Haruka for being selfish, especially after she seized the main role in the musical, and asks Haruka why she wanted to become an idol in the first place. Haruka loses what little confidence she had left and breaks down when she realizes she doesn't even remember why. With Haruka given rest from her work, her friends begin worrying about her. A few days later, when doing an errand for her mother, Haruka meets Tōma, who reveals how things have changed since Jupiter left 961 Production, and admits that he has learnt much from her and 765 Production. After consulting with the hospitalized Producer, Chihaya gathers the rest of the idols and tells them why Haruka wanted to do dance rehearsal with everyone: Haruka realized everyone was drifting apart and losing their true selves due to their work, and she wanted to do the rehearsal to reunite the bonds they always had. Meanwhile, Haruka meets a group of kindergarteners and sings with them until she sees a younger version of herself, who brings her to the same site of the earlier 765 Production Thank-You concert. Then she remembers that she became an idol to sing, dance and make people happy together with her friends, and her younger self, now looking older than when she became an idol, ensures Haruka that her friends believe in her. As Haruka runs back to the 765 Production office, the idols make a live broadcast announcing their New Year's concert and apologizing to Haruka for not realizing what she was doing. Glad to see this, Haruka reunites with her friends.
25	"Everyone, Together!"; Transliteration: "Minna to, Issho ni!" (Japanese: みんなと、いっしょに！)	"Issho" (いっしょ) (Together) by 765PRO All Stars	"READY!!&CHANGE!!!! SPECIAL EDITION" by 765PRO All Stars "Watashi-tachi wa Zutto... Deshou?" (私たちはずっと…でしょう？) (We're Forever... Right?) by 765PRO All Stars	December 23, 2011
Kotori visits the Producer at the hospital. The Producer expresses his wish to see the idols at the New Year's concert. As the idols of 765 Production prepare themselves for the show, the girls get a surprise visit from the Producer who manages to sneak out, thanks to Kotori. The Producer gives the idols some words of encouragement, especially to Haruka as he apologizes for not noticing her problem earlier. As the concert begins, the idols first sing a remix of their song "Ready!! & Change!!!". After doing a short talk to their audience, the idols announce they will be performing the song with Ritsuko on stage, as they manage to convince her to perform with them. Singing their new song, the girls get a huge applause from the crowd while the Producer, Kotori and Junjirō watch from backstage with pride and marvel at how much the girls have grown. As spring comes on, the idols greet the Producer, just released from the hospital, at 765 Productions Studios where he learns that not only has Are We Live? Sunday been renewed, but that Haruka and Miki's musical will be performing nationwide, and that Junjirō has purchased a new office building for everyone using the company's earnings. But everyone at 765 Production gets a nasty surprise when they realize they have been scammed by Kuroi, since the office building was originally owned by Kuroi, who declared bankruptcy of the construction firm that built it. Despite this setback, everyone still looks at the future with confidence as they celebrate Hanami. The series ends with Jupiter performing one of their concerts, the 876 Production idols being interviewed by Yoshizawa, and everyone at 765 Production getting their picture taken by Junjirō.
EX	"The Story of 765PRO"; Transliteration: "Namuko Puro to Iu Monogatari" (Japanese: 765プロという物語)	"My Song" by 765PRO All Stars	Aori Tori (Bluebird) by Chihaya (Asami Imai)	June 16, 2012
A series of short, humorous vignettes showcasing some of the daily aspects of the staff and idols of 765 Production, such as a karaoke outing or a battle over rotating sushi.

=== The Idolmaster Shiny Festa ===
The following are three original video animation episodes included with the three individual versions of the PlayStation Portable game, The Idolmaster Shiny Festa, released on October 25, 2012. They were later released internationally with the iOS version on April 22, 2013. Each episode takes place in the same time frame, revolving around a group of idols being chosen to attend a music festival at an island resort, but the idols chosen are different in each version. The main theme song is "Music" by 765PRO Allstars.

Version	Title	Insert song	Original release date
Harmonic–Sound	"Music in the world"	"Vault That Borderline!" by Haruka Amami (Eriko Nakamura), Chihaya Kisaragi (Asami Imai), Azusa Miura (Chiaki Takahashi) & Ritsuko Akizuki (Naomi Wakabayashi)	October 25, 2012
Haruka, Chihaya and Azusa are chosen for the trip to Vacation Island, but they struggle to decide what songs to perform. Ritsuko later shows up, taking the place of the Producer, and the three decide to have her perform with them. Upon arriving at Vacation Island, they discover Jupiter is also participating in the festival, showing off an impressive stage. As the girls think of how to compete against them, Chihaya suggests they should think of a unique image they can use. As they notice how much music connects people, they decide on their motif; to deliver the world of music to everyone. They manage to win against Jupiter and are soon joined by the others for an encore.
Rhythmic–Note	"Music is a friend"	"Visionary" (ビジョナリー) by Yayoi Takatsuki (Mayako Nigo), Iori Minase (Rie Kugimiya), Hibiki Ganaha (Manami Numakura), Ami & Mami Futami (Asami Shimoda)	October 25, 2012
The Producer brings Yayoi, Iori, Hibiki, Ami and Mami to the Vacation Island resort for a musical festival. Iori suggests they spend their first day playing around, even inviting Yayoi's family to join them. The next day, however, Iori discovers she has lost her precious rabbit, Charles. Realising her worries, the others decide to help her search for it, eventually managing to find it picked up by a little girl. After the concert, they discover the rest of 765 Pro have come to join them.
Melodic–Tune	"Music of love"	"edeN" by Miki Hoshii (Akiko Hasegawa), Yukiho Hagiwara (Azumi Asakura), Makoto Kikuchi (Hiromi Hirata) & Takane Shijō (Yumi Hara)	October 25, 2012
Miki, Yukiho, Makoto and Takane are chosen for the trip to Vacation Island, with Miki deciding they should do a love song, despite the others lacking such experience in romance. Miki comes up with the idea of having a 'date' with the Producer to learn more about love. As Yukiho, Makoto and Takane take turns having their dates, Miki starts to feel uneasy, becoming upset when the Producer shows up late for her date due to running into a festival executive. To make up for it, the girls and the Producer offer Miki a date the next day, and she decides to go on one with everyone.
