= The Idolmaster Live For You! =

Simulation video game

- Limited edition cover art
- Developer: Namco Bandai Games
- Publisher: Namco Bandai Games
- Director: Akihiro Ishihara
- Producer: Yōzō Sakagami
- Writers: Tomoyo Takahashi; Ryūta Jufuku
- Series: The Idolmaster
- Platform: Xbox 360
- Release: JP: February 28, 2008
- Genres: Life simulation, Rhythm
- Mode: Single-player

The Idolmaster Live For You! (アイドルマスター ライブフォーユー!, Aidorumasutā Raibu Fō Yū!; officially stylized as THE iDOLM@STER Live For You!) is a live simulation video game developed and published by Namco Bandai Games for the Xbox 360. It was released in Japan on February 28, 2008, as a sequel to The Idolmaster. The gameplay in Live For You! focuses on coordinating the concert event from The Idolmaster with higher customization of the songs, stage and costumes. The game features a rhythm minigame during performances, which was developed to add a sense of unity with the audience and add excitement. The player is also able to freely manipulate how the performance looks by adjusting the position of the camera towards the idols. The story is told from the perspective of a special producer in charge of coordinating the live performances of 11 pop idols from The Idolmaster series.

Development for the game began in 2007 in response to player tendencies for the original The Idolmaster arcade game and its Xbox 360 port. The development team wanted to create a game that would allow players to easily view the live performances. The protagonist in the game was developed to be a "fan representative" who would coordinate the idols' performances, so any complex scenarios were left out, resulting in a simple story. Including downloadable content, the game features 74 songs the idols perform: 32 songs in original versions and 42 remixes of those songs, which have been released on several music albums. An original video animation episode produced by Actas was bundled with the limited edition release of the game. Live For You! sold 44,000 copies in its first week of release in Japan, and ranked as the fifth best-selling video game in Japan that week.

== Gameplay ==
Yayoi, Yukiho and Iori (respectively) on stage during the support mode. The button icons move from right to left towards a target icon left of center next to the voltage meter.

Live For You! is a live simulation game that revolves around characters related to the talent agency 765 Production (765 Pro), a rising studio located in a small office. On the day of a fan appreciation concert, 765 Pro's company president and main producer suddenly go missing. The player assumes the role of their substitute, an unnamed "special producer" who is put in charge of coordinating the live performances of 765 Pro's 11 idols: Haruka Amami, Chihaya Kisaragi, Yukiho Hagiwara, Yayoi Takatsuki, Ritsuko Akizuki, Azusa Miura, Iori Minase, Makoto Kikuchi, Ami and Mami Futami, and Miki Hoshii. Aiding the special producer is Kotori Otonashi, an office clerk working for 765 Pro.

The player starts by selecting which of the idols will do a performance, and can choose groups of either one, two or three idols at a time. After having a conversation with Kotori and the chosen idol or idols in the green room, the player chooses one of two modes the performance is divided into: a support mode and a photography mode. At this point, the player is allowed to change the player name and the name of the idol unit. Following this, the player chooses which song to perform, what stage to perform on, and which costumes and accessories a given idol will wear. Further customization allows the player to choose who sings which lyrics, and the function of the video cameras including the camera's range (close-up, mid or long) and how it dissolves into the next frame.

In the support mode, the idols begin their on stage performance and the player interacts by playing a rhythm minigame in either easy, medium or hard modes. As the song plays, a predetermined sequence of controller button icons scroll from right to left towards a target icon and the player must press the correct button as the button icons pass over the target icon. The player is scored by the timing accuracy of these presses and is given one of four ratings: Perfect, Good, Normal and OK. The player's performance is also represented by the voltage meter, which increases or decreases depending on if the player successfully hits a note or not. At intervals of 50 successful hits, the idol or idols will perform a special appeal to the audience which suddenly increases the voltage meter and the overall numerical score. In the hard mode, if the voltage meter goes down to zero, the performance will end prematurely; this does not occur in the easy and medium modes. The actions of the buttons as they relate to the performance change depending on the song and degree of difficulty. For example, a button may indicate anything from a cheer, handclap, whistle, musical instrument sound, or other various supportive sounds.

After the performance, Kotori shows the player a result screen, which includes the score, the number of successful Perfect, Good, Normal and OK hits, the maximum number of combo hits, and the final percentage of the voltage meter. The screen will also indicate if the overall score is a high score. Depending on the results, the player may be given additional costumes, accessories, or remixes of songs. Also, the player may be given special messages if the resulting score and voltage meter percentage is over a certain value. The player can view an online ranking of other players' results for either a single song or from all songs put together. The ranking is ranked by the player with the highest score, though a player's voltage meter is also displayed. If the player chooses to save the video for a performance, their score will automatically be uploaded onto the online ranking. The game also includes 48 achievements totaling 1,000G.

In the photography mode, the player freely manipulates how the performance looks by adjusting the position of the camera towards the idols. The player can change the camera angle and zoom in and out in real-time and take photos during the performance. It is optional whether one or more idols will perform a special appeal to the audience. In-game items cannot be obtained by playing in the photography mode. The player is able to save up to five photos and one video of a performance; the video can be saved from both the support and photography modes.

== Development and release ==
Live For You! was developed by Namco Bandai Games and directed by Akihiro Ishihara. In mid-2007, development for the game began in response to player tendencies for the original The Idolmaster arcade game and its Xbox 360 port. Despite the Xbox 360 version of The Idolmaster having 10 idols to choose from and 16 songs, Namco Bandai Games producer Yōzō Sakagami was surprised to find that very few players would try to raise each of the idols and choose all of the songs. Instead, Sakagami notes that most players would only choose one or two of the idols to raise and only about three of the songs. Sakagami suggests that this is because the player starts with a single idol in The Idolmaster, and it takes a while to be able to produce three idols at once. Furthermore, because of the competition in the auditions, players would not want their idol to fail, so they would choose idols they are used to raising and choose songs they are used to hearing; Sakagami had noticed this trend since the arcade game version.

The Xbox 360 port of The Idolmaster was developed to allow in part for the player to comfortably enjoy the various scenarios, but the game still had limitations that made viewing live performances difficult. For example, not only did players say that passing the auditions was difficult, but once the idol was able to perform, she could also make mistakes if she had not trained enough, so there were many players who could not readily see a whole performance without flaws. Taking these concerns into account, Sakagami and the development team thought about how they could allow those players to easily view the live performances, which Sakagami notes is a large part for why Live For You! was developed.

Sakagami notes that Live For You! basically extracted the performance system from the previous game, but with changes and improvements. Instead of calling it a traditional video game, he describes it as a game that allows the player to freely view and enjoy the singing and dancing. To achieve this goal, the development team included added functionality with camera angles and close-ups during performances. Sakagami had previously talked with Hiroyuki Onoda, the director of The Idolmaster's Xbox 360 port, about how fans wanted more camera functionality in the next game, but Sakagami wanted it to be kept as simple as possible to maintain the lightheartedness in Live For You!. The team also touched on the idea to add in a "sense of unity with the audience" and wanted the player to get excited with the idols during performances, leading to the development of the rhythm minigame. Over the course of the minigame's development, the staff started with a simple rhythm game and began to take a more different approach to it, but after some trial and error, they returned to their initial idea for the minigame.

The staff wanted to create a game that would not cause any stress, and that would allow the player to easily choose any character and form three-girl idol units. The protagonist in the game was developed to be a "fan representative" who would coordinate the idols' performances, so any complex scenarios were left out, resulting in a simple story. Live For You! marked the first appearance of 765 Pro's office clerk Kotori Otonashi in the main story, who was included to help guide the player. The game also marked the first time that Mami Futami could appear on stage independent of Ami Futami, and both can now be on stage at the same time. Sakagami calculated that it would take about 300 billion years without sleep to view every possible combination of idol (from one to groups of three), song, stage, costume and accessory available in Live For You!.

The game was released on February 28, 2008 in limited and regular editions. The limited edition came bundled with an 84-page booklet, a custom slipcase, and a DVD containing an original video animation episode. Those who reserved the game also received a card that would allow users to download the song "Shiny Smile" (available March 26, 2008) for use in the game. Two prepaid Microsoft Points cards in 3,500 point denominations featuring The Idolmaster characters were also released to accompany the game. The game was released on Microsoft's Platinum Collection on March 12, 2009. A collection of The Idolmaster and Live For You! titled The Idolmaster Twins was also released on March 12, 2009. Live For You! became available for download through the Xbox Live Marketplace on August 11, 2009.

=== Downloadable content ===
The Xbox 360 port of The Idolmaster had not been developed with the thought of a sequel in mind, so carrying over any downloadable content (DLC) from that game into a sequel was not considered. The development team for Live For You! consulted Microsoft about making the DLC from The Idolmaster available for Live For You!, but despite several ideas, it was ultimately decided that it would be too difficult to transfer DLC from one game into another. However, as a compromise, it was decided that the previous DLC would be available in DLC packs for Live For You! as bonus content. Namco Bandai Games released 17 DLC updates between February 28, 2008 and August 26, 2009 available through the Xbox Live Marketplace. The updates include new songs and remixes, costumes, accessories, icons, themes, and additional side-stories called "Idol Dramas".

=== Music ===
Live For You! features 32 songs in original versions and 42 remixes of those songs, for a total of 74 songs written and composed by a variety of songwriters. Initially, 16 songs are available for the idols to perform, each of which also has a remix version. An additional 16 songs in original versions and 26 remixes were released in downloadable content packs. Like the Xbox 360 port of The Idolmaster, Live For You! was originally not going to have any additional songs available as downloadable content. At the time of the previous game's release, it was unknown what percentage of players would use online connectivity to download content or compete with other players, and it was expected that this would be about 30% of players. However, it was later observed that about 95% of players were using online connectivity, which lead the development team to reconsider adding additional songs. Another reason for the change had to do with a lack of staff. As Sakagami explains, after the Xbox 360 port of The Idolmaster was complete, key members of the development staff moved on to other projects and were unavailable to work on the game mechanics needed to produce additional songs for that game. When development for Live For You! began, those staff members were still unavailable, and the development team had to wait until close to when the game was released to start work on additional songs.

Three songs were originally introduced in Live For You!: "Do-Dai", "My Song" and "Shiny Smile". The songs were released by Nippon Columbia on a six-part CD series titled The Idolmaster Master Live in 2008. The first release was the single for "Shiny Smile" on February 13. This was followed by five compilation albums: Remaster-A on March 5, Remaster-B on April 16, Do-Dai on May 14, My Song on June 18, and Encore on October 29. Songs from Live For You! were also released on The Idolmaster Master Box volumes three through five between April 30, 2008 and March 18, 2009.

== Related media ==
A 224-page guidebook for the Twins collection titled The Idolmaster Twins Precious Album was released on June 26, 2009. The book contains information for both the Xbox 360 port of The Idolmaster and Live For You!, including walkthroughs and details on downloadable content. A 17-minute original video animation (OVA) episode titled The Idolmaster Live For You! was included in the limited edition of Live For You! on February 28, 2008. The OVA was later streamed online in three parts between August 27–29, 2010 on Niconico. The OVA was produced by the animation studio Actas and directed by Keiichiro Kawaguchi. The screenplay was written by Satoru Nishizono, and chief animator Kimitake Nishio based the character design used in the OVA on Toshiyuki Kubooka's original designs. The music used in the OVA was produced by Namco Bandai Games and Romeo, and the ending theme is "The Idolmaster". The DVD also features a music video for the song "Danketsu" (団結; "Unity"), sung by 765 Production's 11 idols from Live For You!.

== Reception ==
Live For You! sold 44,000 copies in its first week of release in Japan, and ranked as the fifth best-selling video game in Japan that week. The game received a score of 28 out of 40 from the Japanese video game magazine Famitsu. The game has been described as akin to a fan disc that would be hard to play if the player did not already have an emotional attachment to the idols. For this reason, Takeshi Iizuka writing for ASCII Media Works strongly recommends playing the Xbox 360 port of The Idolmaster and producing two or three idols before playing Live For You!. Iizuka notes the large differences between the easy, medium and hard modes when playing the support mode, in addition to the varied difficulty between songs. "Go My Way!!" and "Agent Yoru o Yuku" (エージェント夜を往く) in particular are called the most difficult songs to play on hard. During the support mode, the rhythm minigame is described as difficult to focus on if the player also wants to focus on aspects of the idols' performance. The rotating screen during the special appeals to the audience is also called distracting. The game's photography mode was criticized for only allowing the last five photos to be viewable at the end of the performance and for only one video being allowed to be saved at a time. The communication portion of the game is also criticized as being somewhat insufficient.
