= The Idolmaster SP =

Simulation video game

- Cover art of The Idolmaster SP: Perfect Sun. From top to bottom: Makoto, Haruka and Yayoi.
- Developer: Namco Bandai Games
- Publisher: Namco Bandai Games
- Director: Akihiro Ishihara
- Producer: Yōzō Sakagami
- Writers: Tomoyo Takahashi; Emi Tanaka
- Series: The Idolmaster
- Platform: PlayStation Portable
- Release: JP: February 19, 2009
- Genres: Raising simulation, Rhythm
- Modes: Single-player, multiplayer

The Idolmaster SP (アイドルマスターエスピー, Aidorumasutā Esu Pī; officially stylized as THE iDOLM@STER SP) is a series of three Japanese raising simulation video games in The Idolmaster series developed and published by Namco Bandai Games. They were released on February 19, 2009, as Perfect Sun (パーフェクトサン, Pāfekuto San), Missing Moon (ミッシングムーン, Misshingu Mūn), and Wandering Star (ワンダリングスター, Wandaringu Sutā) for the PlayStation Portable as a port of The Idolmaster. The gameplay in SP features changes from its predecessor, including an additional promise system which puts more of a focus on communication. The games include three game modes: two single-player and one multiplayer mode for up to three players. The story is told from the perspective of a producer in charge of training 10 prospective pop idols on their way to stardom, and each version of SP features different idols.

One reason for dividing SP among three versions when developing the games was to allow players to buy the version which features their favorite idols. Rival idols were introduced into SP because the development team felt that rivals are essential for The Idolmaster, which also serve to deepen the bonds between the player and an idol. Including downloadable content, the game features 54 songs the idols perform: 34 songs in original versions and 20 remixes of those songs, which have been released on several music albums. The three versions of SP sold 129,088 units collectively in their first week of sales, and together ranked as the second best-selling video games in Japan that week.

== Gameplay ==
The Idolmaster SP is a series of three raising simulation games in which the player assumes the role of a producer working for the talent agency 765 Production (765 Pro) who is in charge of training 10 prospective pop idols on their way to stardom. The idols who the player is able to produce are dependent on the version of the game. In Perfect Sun, the idols are Haruka Amami, Yayoi Takatsuki, and Makoto Kikuchi; in Missing Moon, the idols are Chihaya Kisaragi, Azusa Miura, and Ritsuko Akizuki; lastly, in Wandering Star, the idols are Iori Minase, Yukiho Hagiwara, and Ami and Mami Futami (who work as a pair). Each version also features an exclusive idol from the rival agency 961 Production who make up the idol unit Project Fairy: Hibiki Ganaha in Perfect Sun, Miki Hoshii in Missing Moon, and Takane Shijō in Wandering Star.

The games have two main modes of gameplay—a free produce mode and a story produce mode—in which the player can choose only one of the 765 Pro idols to produce at a time. In the free produce mode, the player produces a given idol for a period of 52 weeks, culminating in a farewell concert. It is divided into easy, normal and hard modes which correspond to the degree of difficulty it is to satisfy various goals during gameplay. In the story produce mode, the main goal is for the player's chosen idol to win the Idol Ultimate (IU) competition and compete against the rival idols. Unlike the free produce mode, the story produce mode contains an additional aspect called the rank up limit where the player's idol must gain a certain number of fans by a specified time so as to pass qualifying rounds for IU. If the player is not able to gain enough fans or fails an IU audition, the player is given the option to retry; if a player does not choose to retry, that current producing session will end. The games also contain an additional multiplayer mode called the agency mode in which up to three players can play together. Each of the players' idols can communication with each other, compete against each other in auditions, and exchange accessories, among other things.

At the start of every in-game day, the player checks the idol's mail, which may include mail from industry professionals and fan letters. This is followed by greeting the idol, and during this time, text progression pauses when the player is given multiple responses to choose from. Depending on which choice is made will affect an idol's enthusiasm, which is displayed at certain points throughout gameplay by the color of a heart on the heads-up display. An idol's enthusiasm ranges from blue, to yellow and finally red as enthusiasm increases. The player can view the state of an idol's statistics at this time, which are divided into three categories: vocal, dance and visual image. As these increase, an idol's overall image level will also increase, but the level may also decrease during gameplay. The player is shown an idol report which shows an idol's rank and level, and contains current popularity trends in vocal, dance and visual image, which gives the player a guide on how to gain popularity.

The player must organize an idol's daily schedule including what she will do in the morning, afternoon and evening. There is a large amount of freedom in organizing the schedule, though each event may take up either one-third, two-thirds or an entire day of in-game time to complete. The schedule choices include: changing an idol's costume or song, making appointments with reporters or stylists, taking a lesson, doing promotional work, taking an audition, or taking the day off. The lessons are in the form of six minigames which serve to increase an idol's statistics in either vocal, dance or visual image. Each lesson is timed, which varies between lessons, and the lesson's overall performance is ranked from bad, to normal, good and finally perfect. The player may also choose to do a hard lesson, which is more demanding and takes more in-game time. The promotional phase of the gameplay mainly deals with the player talking with the idol and doing jobs to further her publicity. Like when greeting the idol before, the player is given multiple responses to choose from over the course of a conversation. Depending on which choice is made will affect how well or poorly the communication is received from bad, to normal, good and finally perfect communication, which results in either good or bad memories. The good memories are tallied in the heart on the heads-up display.

An example of Yayoi during an audition. The player must gain points in each image category to appeal to the judges, whose interest gauges are displayed on the right.

When the player chooses to do an audition, they first select the song and costume the idol will use if she passes the audition; the song is also used during the audition. Each costume and song have either a vocal, dance or visual attribute which will affect the results of the audition. Before an idol can take an audition, she must satisfy specific criteria for a given audition, such as having a certain number of fans or having already passed a number of previous auditions. Once an audition is chosen, the player can view the rank and level of the other idols who are auditioning. When taking an audition, the player guides the idol to appeal to three judges in vocal, dance and visual image by receiving points in each category. How many points an idol receives when appealing is dependent on her statistics. Each audition is divided into three segments of nine attempts at an appeal followed by a mid-audition review. At the end of each segment, the three idols with the most points in a given image category will receive a number of stars in that category dependent on the current popularity trends from the idol report; an idol will also lose a star if she has the fewest points in a given category.

The interest level of the judges is indicated by three gauges which increase and decrease depending on how well or poorly an appeal is received. The appeals are also affected by how well the player stays in rhythm with the chosen song. If one judge is appealed to too many times, their interest level may drop to zero, at which point all the stars earned for that category will be revoked. The player also has the option to use up to three good memories during each audition which serve to dramatically increase an idol's appeal points and the gauges for the judges. At the end of the audition, the number of stars received determines if the idol passes or not. If an idol passes the audition, she is chosen to do a televised performance of the song previously chosen. A performance serves to increase an idol's number of fans, which in turn can increase an idol's rank if enough fans have been obtained for a given rank. An idol's rank starts at F, and goes up in stages to E, D, C, B, A and finally S. If the player chooses to take the day off, an idol's enthusiasm will automatically increase. Once the day's schedule has been completed, the player returns to 765 Pro with the idol. The player will be shown the idol's rank, how many fans she has gained over the course of the day, and how many fans she currently has. If available, the idol will be given various presents from her fans at this time.

An additional feature to the gameplay is the promise system, which has to do with the player making various promises with an idol. If the promise is kept, the player will receive some sort of bonus, but if the promise is broken, there is a large penalty. The player is given the option to make a promise or not, and can usually refuse to do so. These promises take various forms, such as arranging to take auditions with rival idols, arranging to meet with reporters or stylists, and specific demands an idol will make in regard to her schedule. For lessons and auditions, the player is also given the option for the idol to promise to do a self-lesson or self-audition in which she does them by herself. For a self-lesson or self-audition, the player inputs a time and date, and the PlayStation Portable (PSP) will be put into sleep mode. The closer the player is to taking the PSP out of sleep mode by the specified time, the better the results of the lesson or audition. A similar feature is sometimes employed when the player chooses to end the game. An idol will stop the player and designate a time and date by which the player must continue playing the game; the player does not have the option to refuse.

== Development and release ==
The Idolmaster SP was developed by Namco Bandai Games and directed by Akihiro Ishihara. When developing the ports, the staff wanted to reach out to players outside of those who had already played the original arcade game or its Xbox 360 port. Ishihara himself not only wanted there to be a line to buy the games in Akihabara, but also wanted there to be those who would see the games being sold in a shop and spontaneously buy them. For this reason, it was decided that limited editions of SP would not be sold. Ishihara felt the need to get closer to the end users in part because of the players who had helped spread the word about The Idolmaster, so SP was divided into three versions to allow players to buy the version which features their favorite idols.

In addressing the PlayStation Portable's graphic capabilities compared to previous games in the series being developed for the Xbox 360, Ishihara points out that despite what people may think, once the idols start moving, they actually look much better than when viewed as a still image. Ishihara also notes that many of the idols' facial expressions in SP were changed from previous games. He goes on to say that for a game intended for a portable game console, there was a considerable amount of tinkering, and that the development team had to completely rebuild the game.

Ishihara likens the story produce mode first introduced in SP to a strategic simulation game where a large development in the story will occur after one part of the story is cleared. The development team included a large amount of story within each idol rank, as well as smaller scenarios between the ranks, resulting in a substantial amount of detail. The team had wanted to include a mode that would be similar to the original arcade game's gameplay, but Ishihara thought that simply adding in the functionality of the arcade game would not work. So while the story produce mode in SP can be thought as similar to how the arcade game operated, Ishihara points out that there is an added sense of tension surrounding an increase in idol rank, which in turn causes the story in general to be tense. While Ishihara goes on to say the story produce mode was developed to be relatively severe, he notes that as long as players put in the effort, anyone can clear the game.

The introduction of rivals into SP had to do with Ishihara's view that rivals are essential for The Idolmaster. In the arcade game version, players compete against other players online during the idol auditions, but because this feature was not going to be included in SP, the staff thought to create rivals that the player would compete against in the story produce mode. Ishihara describes the main theme of The Idolmaster as having to do with the entertainment industry, and according to him, there needs to occasionally be elements that "shake up" the industry, such as rival characters. Namco Bandai Games producer Yōzō Sakagami notes that the development team focused on how to further deepen the bonds between the player and idols, and according to him, rivals are an essential part of that. Along with this, it was suggested that one of the idols leave 765 Production and go to rival studio 961 Production, and Miki Hoshii was chosen based on her "free and uncontrolled" personality.

The games were released in Japan on February 19, 2009. They were later released on Sony's PSP the Best collection on January 28, 2010, and became available for download through the PlayStation Store on October 28, 2010. Namco Bandai Games released 18 downloadable content (DLC) updates between February 19, 2009, and July 28, 2010, available through the PlayStation Store. An additional DLC update originally released with The Idolmaster Break! manga was re-released on the PlayStation Store on October 28, 2010. The updates include new songs and remixes, costumes, accessories, stages, and additional side-stories called "Idol Dramas".

=== Music ===
The Idolmaster SP features 34 songs in original versions and 20 remixes of those songs, for a total of 54 songs written and composed by a variety of songwriters. Initially, the three versions each contain 20 songs, though 17 of them are common to each version. The remaining three songs in each version can only initially be sung by one idol. In Perfect Sun, "I Want" is sung by Haruka Amami, "Kiramekirari" (キラメキラリ) is sung by Yayoi Takatsuki, and "Meisō Mind" (迷走Mind) is sung by Makoto Kikuchi. In Missing Moon, "Ippai Ippai" (いっぱいいっぱい) is sung by Ritsuko Akizuki, "Me ga Au Toki" (目が逢う瞬間) is sung by Chihaya Kisaragi, and "Tonari ni..." (隣に…) is sung by Azusa Miura. In Wandering Star, "Futari no Kioku" (フタリの記憶) is sung by Iori Minase, "Kosmos, Cosmos" is sung by Yukiho Hagiwara, "Start Star" (スタ→トスタ→) is sung by Ami and Mami Futami. Versions of these nine songs were later released in downloadable content packs so that all the idols could sing them, including Hibiki Ganaha, Miki Hoshii, and Takane Shijō. An additional eight songs in original versions were released in downloadable content packs, as were the 20 remixes.

Five songs were originally introduced in SP: "Colorful Days", "Kimi wa Melody" (キミはメロディ), "L-O-B-M", "Mata ne" (またね) and "Overmaster" (オーバーマスター). The songs were released by Nippon Columbia on a 10-part CD series titled The Idolmaster Master Special between 2008 and 2010. The first two releases were the singles for "Colorful Days" and "Overmaster" on December 10, 2008. This was followed by eight compilation albums: Master Special volumes one through six from February 4 to August 5, 2009, Master Special Winter on December 16, 2009, and Master Special Spring on March 17, 2010.

== Reception ==
The three versions of SP sold 129,088 units collectively in their first week of sales, and together ranked as the second best-selling video games in Japan that week. The games sold an additional 26,931 units the following week, for a total of 156,019 units collectively. The games sold so well in Akihabara on their release day that several stores had sold out by late afternoon, in part because most who bought one version also bought the other two. SP's three versions received a combined score of 31 out of 40 from the Japanese video game magazine Famitsu. The games were voted one of the most anticipated future game at the 2008 Japan Game Awards. In writing for Famitsu, reviewer Sekai Sandai Miyokawa notes that in addition to the nature of the game having to do with training idols, SP being split into three versions may be off-putting for beginners to The Idolmaster series. However, he goes on to say that the game is not only friendly to beginners, but that each version have plenty of worthwhile content that gradually draws the player further into the series. The minigames played during the lessons are called "surprisingly difficult," especially if the player is aiming for a perfect score, and the continuous need to take more lessons has been likened to the plots of Star of the Giants and Aim for the Ace!.

Despite a perceived drop in graphical quality compared to previous Idolmaster games developed for the Xbox 360, the idols' performances and bountiful facial expressions in SP are praised for their "high quality." The story presented in the story produce mode is described as "skillfully done with interesting developments." The game has been praised for the variety in musical genres of its songs, many of which are described as "leaving an impression" in one's ears. Miyokawa writes that the desire to hear all of the game's songs is one reason why someone would continue to play the game.
