= Yuko Iida filmography =

The following is the select filmography of Japanese voice actress Yuko Iida.

== Filmography ==
Main characters are in bold.

=== Television animation ===
Year	Title	Role	Note
2011	Battle Spirits Overlord	Audience; Child A	
2012	Queen's Blade: Rebellion	Girl; Child D	
2012	Say "I love you."	Female student	Episode 10
2012	Little Busters!	Cell phone announcement; Female student B	Episode 11; 17
2013	Kotoura-san	Friend B	Episodes 2, 4–5, 9
2013	D.C.III ~Da Capo III~	Woman 1	Episode 3
2013	Little Busters! Refrain	Child B	Episode 8
2013	Haganai NEXT	French movie woman; Rui	Episode 8; Episode 9
2013	Aiura	**Saki Iwasawa**	
2013	The "Hentai" Prince and the Stony Cat	Female Student	Episode 1
2013	Hyperdimension Neptunia	Villager C; Child	Episode 1; Episode 11
2013	Kin-iro Mosaic	Female high school student A	Episode 2
2013	To Aru Kagaku no Railgun S	Girl A	Episode 17
2013	Strike the Blood	Secretary	Episode 1
2013	White Album 2	Female student A; Female student B; Female Teacher	Episode 11; Episode 4; Episode 10
2013	A Lull in the Sea	Chiharu Masaki	Episode 6
2013	Little Busters! Refrain	Child B	Episode 8
2014	Witch Craft Works	**Mei Menowa**; Rabbit Knight; Nichi	
2014	Golden Time	Takeuchi	Episode 18
2014	Strike the Blood	Kataya Justina	Episodes 22, 24
2014	The Irregular at Magic High School	Female student; Rika Izumi	Episode 1; Episode 11
2014	Selector Infected WIXOSS	Female student; Girl	Episodes 1 and 4; Episode 12
2014	If Her Flag Breaks	Announcer; Assassin; Sister; Sota (young)	Episodes 12–13; Episode 8; Episode 2–3, 5
2014	Gaist Crusher	Obsidian Izuna (young)	Episode 4
2014	M3: The Dark Metal	Female student B; Boy; Attendee B	
2014	JoJo's Bizarre Adventure: Stardust Crusaders	Child A	Episode 10
2014	Daimidaler: Prince vs Penguin Empire	Minister of Education	Episode 11
2014	Riddle Story of Devil	Wataru (Haru's younger brother)	Episode 11
2014	Doraemon	Chorus Girl A; Inuyama	
2014	Crayon Shin-chan	Kindergartener	
2014	Selector Spread WIXOSS	Female student; Original Fumio	Episode 3; Episode 5
2015	Your Lie in April	Audience Member; Female student	Episodes 12–13; Episode 1
2015	Doraemon	Cat B; Girl B	
2015	Crayon Shin-chan	Research student B	
2015	Food Wars!: Shokugeki no Soma	Female student A	Episode 8
2015	Monster Musume: Everyday Life with Monster Girls	Baseball Cap Girl	Episode 4
2015	THE iDOLM@STER Cinderella Girls	Kanade Hayami	Episodes 22, 25
2015	Shin Atashin'chi	**Shimi-chan** (2nd generation)	
2015	Aoharu × Machinegun	Woman	
2015	Chivalry of a Failed Knight	Underling	Episode 3
2015	Comet Lucifer	Caster; Forecaster	Episode 3; Episode 4
2016	Shin Atashin'chi	**Shimi-chan** (2nd generation)	
2016	Doraemon	Tan; Female student; Young boy; Girl	
2016	Please Tell Me! Galko-chan	Boy; **Okako**	Episode 7; Episodes 4, 6, 8–9, 11–12
2016	Prince of Stride: Alternative	Child	Episode 10
2016	Under One Person	**Chō Soran (young)**	
2016	Magi: Adventure of Sinbad	Lady-in-waiting B	Episode 13
2016	Food Wars! Shokugeki no Soma season 2	Audience member C; Student B	Episode 9; Episode 2
2016	Regalia: The Three Sacred Stars	Caster	
2016	Alderamin on the Sky	Female soldier	Episode 6
2016	Keijo!!!!!!!!	Hana Matsumoto; Miho Hashimoto; Tae Yokosugi	Episode 3; Episode 1
2016	JoJo's Bizarre Adventure: Diamond Is Unbreakable	Female Ambulance Worker; Woman	Episode 39; Episodes 35-36
2017	ClassicaLoid	Child; Female student	Episode 18; Episode 15
2017	Super Lovers 2	Aki Kaidō (young)	
2017	Chiruran 1/2	Kyoto woman	Episode 4
2017	Doraemon	Woman; Ali; Girl	
2017	Aikatsu Stars!	Yozora Kasumi fan; Singing class first year student	
2017	Saga of Tanya the Evil	Boy	Episode 11
2017	Seven Mortal Sins	Mother	Episode 4
2017	THE iDOLM@STER Cinderella Girls Gekijō	Kanade Hayami	
2017	Princess Principal	**Gazelle**	
2017	Re:Creators	Junior high schooler	Episode 17
2017	Gamers!	Female customer	Episode 7
2017	A Centaur's Life	Special agent	Episode 10
2017	Our love has always been 10 centimeters apart	Student	Episodes 1-3
2018	iDOLISH7	Convenience store clerk; Female customer	
2018	The Disastrous Life of Saiki K.	Ken; Kurisu	Episode 5; Episode 23
2018	Aikatsu Stars!	Daisy	
2018	THE iDOLM@STER Cinderella Girls Gekijō	Kanade Hayami	
2018	Spiritpact -Bond of the Underworld-	Ki (young)	Episodes 1-2
2018	Hinamatsuri	Hostess	Episode 2
2018	Last Period: the journey to the end of the despair	Blue Monk; Green	Episode 11
2018	Last Hope	Child; Leon Lau (young); Researcher	Episodes 7, 22; Episode 13; Episode 11
2018	Seven Senses of the Reunion	Magician, Haruto Amō (young)	
2018	Hi Score Girl	Male student E	Episode 3
2018	Phantom in the Twilight	Program MC	Episode 5
2018	Dakaichi: I'm Being Harassed By the Sexiest Man of the Year	Interviewer	
2018	Bloom Into You	Female student	Episode 4
2018	Million Arthur	School girl	Episode 5
2019	Girly Air Force	Announcer	Episode 2
2019	That Time I Got Reincarnated as a Slime	Female staff	Episode 20
2019	The Morose Mononokean 2	Ashiya's sister	
2019	Endro~!	Villager	Episode 9
2019	THE iDOLM@STER Cinderella Girls Gekijō	Kanade Hayami	
2019	The Demon Girl Next Door	Child	Episode 7
2019	Fire Force	Child; Boy	Episode 8; Episode 9
2019	Stars Align	Girl Student	Episodes 1-2
2019	Null & Peta	Mob; Children; Medical staff B	
2019	Rifle Is Beautiful	Student	
2019	Ahiru no Sora	Elementary School Student; Kenji Natsume (young)	Episode 13; Episode 8
2019	Kedama no Gonjirō	Mob boy	
2020	Gleipnir	Female student	
2020	Zoids Wild	Boy	
2020	A3!	Pedestrian	
2020	Sakura Wars: The Animation	Children C	
2020	Tamayomi	Nao Nakata	
2020	Monster Girl Doctor	Sirsha Thisius	Episode 1
2020	Mewkledreamy	Petit Tomato B; First year female student 3; Housewife A	
2020	Higurashi: When They Cry - Gou	Boys; Classmate	Episodes 7–8, 11, 19, 21–22; Episodes 1-2
2021	Re:ZERO -Starting Life in Another World-	Otto Suwen (10 years old)	Episode 40
2021	Wixoss Diva(A)Live	Swimming Club member C	Episode 6
2021	Blue Reflection Ray	Kaori Ema	Episode 4
2021	Combatants Will Be Dispatched!	Woman B	Episode 5
2021	Mewkledreamy Mix!	First year club member 1	
2021	Seirei Gensouki: Spirit Chronicles	Cosette	Episode 4
2022	How a Realist Hero Rebuilt the Kingdom	Rowe	Episode 20
2022	Healer Girl	Children	Episodes 6-7
2022	Play It Cool, Guys	High School Girl	Episode 2
2022	Shinobi no Ittoki	Schoolgirl A	Episode 3
2022	Immoral Guild	Female student 3	Episode 3
2022	VazzRock the Animation	Yuuto (child)	Episode 4
2023	Shadowverse Flame	Boy	Episodes 41, 46-47
2023	THE IDOLM@STER Cinderella Girls U149	Kanade Hayami	
2023	Kizuna no Allele	Game student 2	Episode 9
2023	Sweet Reincarnation	Boy; Marc's brother; Child 2; Child	Episode 2; Episode 3; Episode 8; Episode 9
2023	Horimiya: The Missing Pieces	Female broadcaster	Episode 3
2023	The Gene of AI	Child of Lopidia	Episode 12
2023	My New Boss Is Goofy	Nurse	Episode 3
2023	MF Ghost	**Kyoko Kurihara**	
2024	Wonderful PreCure!	Child; Hedgedog; Classmate; Niko squirrel; Townspeople; Boy; Cat; **Kirarin Penguin**; **Ohkuma**	Episode 1; Episode 13; Episode 19; Episode 22; Episode 23; Episode 27; Episode 34
2024	MF Ghost Season 2	**Kyoko Kurihara**	
2024	Seirei Gensouki: Spirit Chronicles Season 2	Cosette	
2024	Blue Box	Club member	Episode 7
2024	Detective Conan	Hotel receptionist	Episode 1144
2025	Grisaia Phantom Trigger	Takeshi	Episode 5
2025	You and Idol Pretty Cure	Hamori Sakura	
2025	Trillion Game	New employee	Episode 19

=== Original video animation ===
Year	Title	Role	Note
2013	To Love-Ru Darkness	Manager; Nana's pet	DVD bundled with the limited edition of the JC volume 9
2015	Witch Craft Works OVA	Mei Menowa; Rabbit Knight; Nichi	DVD bundled with the 8th manga volume
2016	The Heroic Legend of Arslan		
2017	XFLAG Original Anime: The Mischievous Witch and the City that Never Sleeps	Boy	
2017-2021	Girls und Panzer das Finale	Azumi	Movie series
2018	Strike The Blood III	Kataya Justina	Episode 9
2019	We Never Learn	Female A	Bundled with the limited edition of the manga's 14th volume
2020-2021	Strike The Blood IV	Kataya Justina	Episode 12

=== Web anime ===
Year	Title	Role	Note
2014	X Maiden	**Aoi Tachibana**	
2015	Comical Psychosomatic Medicine	Female B; Female; Queen	
2015	The reason why she likes kanji	Natsumi Hatano	Series of anime shorts created by Studio 4 °C as a collaboration with the Japan Kanji Aptitude Test
2017-2021	THE IDOLM@STER Cinderella Girls Gekijō: Extra Stage	Kanade Hayami	2 seasons
2017	The Mischievous Witch and the City that Never Sleeps	Boy	
2020	Mashin Hero Wataru: The Seven Spirits of Ryujinmaru	Kennosuke Tsukahara	Episodes 3–4
2020	Bakugan: Armored Alliance	Brawler 3	Episode 28
2021	Baki the Grappler	Rumina's Classmate B	Episode 1
2022	CINDERELLA GIRLS 10th Anniversary Celebration Animation "ETERNITY MEMORIES"	Kanade Hayami	Film in conmmemoration of the series' 10th anniversary
2024	Atashin'chi NEXT	Puppy, **Shimi-chan**	Episode 3, Episode 5

=== Theatrical animation ===
Year	Title	Role	Note
2014	Bodacious Space Pirates: Abyss of Hyperspace	Caster	
2014	Harmonie	Female student	
2015	Love Live! The School Idol Movie		
2015	Girls und Panzer der Film	Azumi	
2017	Free! Take Your Marks	Girl; Tourism booth female; Female staff member; Veronica	Episode 1; Episode 2; Episode 3; Episode 4
2018	Penguin Highway	Fujioka	
2021	Sing a Bit of Harmony	Female student	
2021-Ongoing	Princess Principal: Crown Handler	Gazelle	Six part animated film series
2024	Doraemon: Nobita's Earth Symphony	Classmate	
2024	The Colors Within	Female student	

=== Video games ===
Year	Title	Role	platform
2012	Anohana: The Flower We Saw That Day	Bully, Fast food place clerk	PlayStation Portable
2012	Love, Election and Chocolate PORTABLE	Chii (Isara's youngest brother)	PlayStation Portable
2013	Aiura -It's a concentration game showdown!	Saki Iwasawa	Mobile game
2013	The Pet Girl of Sakurasou	Award ceremony facilitator	PlayStation 3, PlayStation Vita
2013	GUNDAM BREAKER	Hot-blooded lady	PlayStation 3, PlayStation Vita
2014	Ar nosurge: Ode to an Unborn Star	Armor Princess	PlayStation 3
2014	Celestial Craft Fleet	Latte, Sophia, Yuna, Yukari, Obra	Mobile game
2014	Kotokoto ~Land of Rasetsu and Kotodama~	Rasetsu Amakusa, Minmin Chukaya, Naru Raioin, Shirahime Shiranui, Mikagami, Komachi Hicho, Manta Akudou	Mobile game
2015	THE IDOLM@STER Cinderella Girls	Kanade Hayami	Mobile game
2015	Break Gakuen	Fire Department/Hinakako Komachi, Breeding Department/Kibi Danko, Jailbreak Club/Kasarebe Keie	Mobile game
2015	Fuuinyusha! Main Island and the Sky Labyrinth	The needle and thread prodigy Colton, The child of stockinette knitting Uriel	Mobile game
2015	Shironeko Project	Lute, Prisoner	Mobile game
2015	THE iDOLM@STER Cinderella Girls Starlight Stage	Kanade Hayami	Mobile game
2015	LORD of VERMILION III	Don Quixote	Arcade game
2016	PSO2es	Fer, King Kazan, Shooting Drive, Dahlweigl, Fighting Beat, Agito Niren, Soul Eater, Ignis, Kusha Nebula, Golem Bluffs, Re Santaso, Drill Knuckle	Mobile game
2016	Rage of Bahamut	Kanade Hayami	Mobile game
2016	Yokai Hyakuhime-tan!	Okako	Mobile game
2016	In'you Otogi Soul	Amaimo, Dōtanuki, Gabriel, Raijū	Mobile game
2016	Girls und Panzer: Great Tankery Operation!	Azumi	Mobile game
2016	Girls und Panzer: Walk	Azumi	Mobile game
2016	Dragon Shooter		Mobile game
2017	Gravity Rush 2		PlayStation 4
2017	The Alchemist Code	Blanchett	Mobile game
2017	THE iDOLM@STER Cinderella Girls Viewing Revolution	Kanade Hayami	PlayStation VR
2018	LOST TRIGGER	Hilda	Mobile game
2018	Alice Gear Aegis	Sora Tenko	Mobile game
2018	IDOLiSH7 Twelve Fantasia!		PlayStation Vita
2018	Girls und Panzer: Dream Tank Match	Azumi	PlayStation 4
2018	PSO2es	Niren Agito	Mobile game
2018	Katana Maidens ~ Toji No Miko: Kizamishi Issen no Tomoshibi	Momo Tatsunami	Mobile game
2018	Kyōtō Kotoba RPG - Kotodaman	Uruuru, Sanshin, Hakkawauso, Uruuru yujin, Gyogyo, Kichiri, Kodoku Elebure, Ohanamyses, Kegedim	Mobile game
2018	Jikkyō Powerful Pro Yakyū 2018	Senga Katori	PlayStation 4, PlayStation Vita
2018	Abyss Horizon	Texas, Ose, Kerun	Mobile game
2018	Bullet Girls Phantasia	Ladoria Sealwinde	PlayStation 4, PlayStation Vita, PC game
2018	Pro Yakyū: Famista Evolution	Asobillion Iida	Nintendo Switch
2019	High School Fleet: Kantai Battle de Pinch!	Tsutsuji Kamo	Mobile game
2020	Cinderella Nine	Nao Nakata	Mobile game
2020	Vivid Army	Patsy	Mobile game
2020	Jikkyō Powerful Pro Yakyū	Wa-chan (Wakana Wakamatsu)	Mobile game
2020	Baseball Superstars	Velor, Aoko, Monique	Mobile game
2021	Gyakuten Othellonia	Sastasha	Mobile game
2021	Seven Mortal Sins X-TASY	Zoe	Mobile game
2022	THE iDOLM@STER POPLINKS	Kanade Hayami	Mobile game
2022	Arknights	Tulip	Mobile game
2023	Alice Gear Aegis	Kasumi Ohtori	Mobile game
2024	Yggdra Re:Birth	Banana	Mobile game
2024	Honkai: Star Rail	Wonweek	PlayStation 5, Mobile game, PC game

=== Drama CDs ===
Year	Title	Role	Notes
2013	Exoskull Zero	Shinden Volunteer Corps Seven	CD bundled with the Champion Red February issue
2013	Noragami	Female student	CD bundled with the special edition of the manga's 9th volume
2014	Ateya no Tsubaki	Kid from the temple school	CD bundled with the manga's 9th volume
2014	Witch Craft Works	Mei Menowa	CDs blunded with the limited edition of the anime Blu-ray volumes 2, 4 and 6
2014	Candy Pop Nightmare	High school girl	CD bundled with the special edition of the manga's 4th volume
2014	GANGSTA.	Woman	CD bundled with the limited edition of the manga's 6th volume
2015	Koucha Ōji (Tea Prince)	House Economy club member	CD bundled with the first limited edition of the manga's 4th volume
2015	Defying Kurosaki-kun	Girl	CD bundled with the special edition of the manga's 5th volume
2015	Doujin de Kanjite	Iguchi	Based on the original manga
2016	THE IDOLM@STER Cinderella Girls [Challenges to change]	Kanade Hayami	CD bundled with the limited edition of the anime Blu-ray/DVD's 8th volume
2016	Girls und Panzer das Finale	Azumi	5th drama CD: "I made a new friend"
2016	Love Jōtō	Kei (child)	Based on the original manga
2016	Fire Emblem Fates	Boy	Dark Night Kingdom CD drama
2017	Neko ni wa Inu wo	Senior female worker	Based on the original manga
2017	Kuroneko Kareshi no Afurekata	Mayu	Based on the original manga
2017	Oryuu~I am here~	Female student	Based on an original story written by the novel's author
2022	Fairy-AID	Sara Makishima	5th volume of the CD series
2024	Ripping Someone Open Only Makes Them Bleed	Julia Gotō	CD drama adaptation of Yoru Sumino's novel

=== Digital comics ===
Year	Title	Role	Notes
2022	Seija no Kōshin	Hana	Available on Shonen Jump's official YouTube Channel
2022	Yamabikona Nichijō	Yuuki Hazuki	Available on Shonen Jump's official YouTube Channel
2022	Akuyaku Reijou wa Oshi Couple no Tame ni Kon'yaku Haki wo Goshomou desu	Natalia Judith	Available on Zero-Sum Online's official YouTube Channel

=== Narration ===
Year	Title	Notes
2016	Cultural broadcasting A&G TRIBAL RADIO Edison	Commercial narration
2017	Jōhō wo Motte Tabi ni Deyou! Ariyoshi no Zatsugakurūzu	Narration featured on the program aired on March 12 on Kansai TV and Fuji Television
2018	Ariyoshi Chūkei ～Genba kara Otsutaeshimasu	Narration featured on the program aired on January 6 on Kansai TV
2018	Kodawari Setlist	Navigator on the Radio NIKKEI's program from March 12 to March 23

=== Theatrical performances ===
Year	Title	Role	Notes
2017	Mikeneko Donburi Voice Theater 4th Cup "Tir Na Nog" dai 3 Gakushō ~ Rū to Fuzoroina Futago ~	Minerva	Reading theatrical performance hosted by Mikeneko Donburi group held on September 23 and 24
2018	Voice Garage Theater Vol.1 ~Rōdoku Geki~		Reading drama theatrical performance hosted by the voice actor variety channel Voice Garage on April 21 and April 22

=== Radio and variety programs ===
As guest are only featured those with a physical release

Year	Title	Notes
2013	Aiura radio	As Saki Iwasawa. Radio program broadcast on NicoNico and Onsen Radio
2016-2023	Iida Yuko · Takano Asami no marutto 360-do	Variety program broadcast irregularly on NicoNico from October 27, 2016, to July 27, 2023. Two special DVDs were released physically: Iida Yuko · Takano Asami no marutto 360-do ～Kyoto hen～ released February 28, 2018; Iida Yuko · Takano Asami no marutto 360-do ～Okinawa hen～ released December 19, 2018
2018	Onsen King "Shimonohiro" no Radio: Kimi wa mochiron <Onsen> family da yo ne?	Radio program broadcast on Onsen radio
2019	Onsen Junior Radio: Igarashi Takumi · Iida Yuko no Sugoi Radio	Radio program broadcast on Onsen radio
2019	Yoshimura Haruka no Maniac Date	Guest on the Haruka Yoshimura's variety program. Included on the 7th volume of the physical released DVD on February 14, 2020
2019-2020	Iida Yuko · Murai Misato no Okyakusama wo Yorokoba Setai!	Radio program broadcast biweekly on Onsen radio from November 4, 2019, to January 13, 2020
2019-2022	Lumine-san	Radio program broadcast every Wednesday on NicoNico and YouTube at 18:00 JST from March 20, 2019, to September 9, 2022

=== Commercials and advertisement ===
Year	Title	Role	Notes
2013	Samurai Girls		Commercial film
2014	Aria the Scarlet Ammo	Kana	Commercial film
2016	Witch Craft Works	Mei Menowa	Pachinko Slot commercial
2016	Aria the Scarlet Ammo	Kana	Pachinko Slot commercial
2017-2018	LaLaBit Station	Detective Yuko Iida	Program broadcast on Bandai Namco Entertainment's YouTube channel that introduced products from different franchises of the company as well as different variety entertainment sections
2018	Yatate Bunko promotional commercial	Tawo	Promotional video of some of Yatate Bunko's works
2018-2019	Asobillion		Program broadcast on Bandai Namco Entertainment's YouTube channel and ASOBI STORE's Twitter account introduced products from different franchises of the company as well as different variety entertainment sections

=== Other works ===
Year	Title	Role	Notes
2012	AT-X Our Summer Fes 2012 ~ Fresh Summer Festival Team ~		
2012	Heijo-kyo Historical Picture Scroll - Heijo-kyo -Peaceful Capital-	Boy	Heijokyo History Museum VR Theater
2013	Shabette Chara	Saki Iwasawa	Mobile phone conversational app with different anime characters
2013	AT-X Our Summer Fes 2013 ~ Fresh Summer Festival Team ~		
2017	Onsen Musume	Kazuki Naruko	Character of the multimedia project representing Naruko Onsen region in the Miyagi Prefecture
2017	MacGyver	Ethan Jericho (Elisha Henig)	American TV series dubbing

== Discography ==
=== Character songs ===
Year	Album details	Interpreters	Song	Notes
2013	Kani☆Do-Luck! (カニ☆Do-Luck!): Released: April 4; Label: Pony Canyon; Format: CD	Aiu♥rabu (あいう♥らぶ): Kanaka Amaya (Yui Nakajima); Saki Iwasawa (Yuko Iida); Ayuko Uehara (Nao Tamura)	Kani☆Do-Luck! (カニ☆Do-Luck!)	Aiura TV anime opening theme
2013	Kani☆Do-Luck! (カニ☆Do-Luck!): Released: April 4; Label: Pony Canyon; Format: CD	Aiu♥rabu (あいう♥らぶ): Kanaka Amaya (Yui Nakajima); Saki Iwasawa (Yuko Iida); Ayuko Uehara (Nao Tamura)	Kagirinaku Happy ni Chikashī Zahyō ni iru Aiura (限りなくハッピーに近しい座標にいるあいうら)	
2013	Ichigo Ichie (いちごいちえ): Released: April 4; Label: Pony Canyon; Format: CD	Aiu♥rabu (あいう♥らぶ): Kanaka Amaya (Yui Nakajima); Saki Iwasawa (Yuko Iida); Ayuko Uehara (Nao Tamura)	Ichigo Ichie (いちごいちえ)	Aiura TV anime ED theme
2013	Ichigo Ichie (いちごいちえ): Released: April 4; Label: Pony Canyon; Format: CD	Aiu♥rabu (あいう♥らぶ): Kanaka Amaya (Yui Nakajima); Saki Iwasawa (Yuko Iida); Ayuko Uehara (Nao Tamura)	Akasata Number One ☆ (あかさたナンバーワン☆)	
2013	Yaruki Minus? 100% (やる気マイナス？100%): Released: May 29; Label: Pony Canyon; Format: CD	Saki Iwasawa (Yuko Iida)	Yaruki Minus? 100% (やる気マイナス？100%)	Character song CD
2013	Yaruki Minus? 100% (やる気マイナス？100%): Released: May 29; Label: Pony Canyon; Format: CD	Saki Iwasawa (Yuko Iida)	DoDon ga Don!♪ (DoDonがドンっ♪)	Character song CD
2013	Aiura Blu-ray Bonus CD: Released: August 7; Label: Pony Canyon; Format: CD	Aiu♥rabu (あいう♥らぶ): Kanaka Amaya (Yui Nakajima); Saki Iwasawa (Yuko Iida); Ayuko Uehara (Nao Tamura)	Zutto Ne (ずっとね)	Anime Blu-ray bonus CD. TV anime insert song
2014	Witch☆Activity (ウィッチ☆アクティビティ): Released: February 5; Label: Lantis; Format: CD	KMM team (KMM団): Tanpopo Kuraishi (Shiori Izawa); Mei Menowa (Yuko Iida); Rin Kazari (Momo Asakura); Kanna Utsugi (Shiina Natsukawa); Kotetsu Katsura (Natsumi Hioka)	Witch☆Activity (ウィッチ☆アクティビティ)	Witch Craft Works TV anime ending theme
2014	Witch☆Activity (ウィッチ☆アクティビティ): Released: February 5; Label: Lantis; Format: CD	KMM team (KMM団): Tanpopo Kuraishi (Shiori Izawa); Mei Menowa (Yuko Iida); Rin Kazari (Momo Asakura); Kanna Utsugi (Shiina Natsukawa); Kotetsu Katsura (Natsumi Hioka)	Saturday Night Witches	
2014	Witch Craft Works Character Song Album (ウィッチクラフトワークス キャラクターソングアルバム): Released: July 23; Label: Lantis; Format: CD	KMM team (KMM団): Tanpopo Kuraishi (Shiori Izawa); Mei Menowa (Yuko Iida); Rin Kazari (Momo Asakura); Kanna Utsugi (Shiina Natsukawa); Kotetsu Katsura (Natsumi Hioka)	KMM-dan dan'inbangō no uta. - Numbers (KMM団団員番号のうた。 - Numbers)	TV anime Witch Craft Works character song CD
2014	Witch Craft Works Character Song Album (ウィッチクラフトワークス キャラクターソングアルバム): Released: July 23; Label: Lantis; Format: CD	KMM team (KMM団): Tanpopo Kuraishi (Shiori Izawa); Mei Menowa (Yuko Iida); Rin Kazari (Momo Asakura); Kanna Utsugi (Shiina Natsukawa); Kotetsu Katsura (Natsumi Hioka)	MimiLove-Maximum - Nekomimi Majō (MimiLove-Maximum - 獣耳な魔女)	TV anime Witch Craft Works character song CD
2014	Witch Craft Works Character Song Album (ウィッチクラフトワークス キャラクターソングアルバム): Released: July 23; Label: Lantis; Format: CD	KMM team (KMM団): Tanpopo Kuraishi (Shiori Izawa); Mei Menowa (Yuko Iida); Rin Kazari (Momo Asakura); Kanna Utsugi (Shiina Natsukawa); Kotetsu Katsura (Natsumi Hioka)	Saturday Night Witches Pocket Cut Mix	TV anime Witch Craft Works character song CD
2014	Witch Craft Works Character Song Album (ウィッチクラフトワークス キャラクターソングアルバム): Released: July 23; Label: Lantis; Format: CD	KMM team (KMM団): Tanpopo Kuraishi (Shiori Izawa); Mei Menowa (Yuko Iida); Rin Kazari (Momo Asakura); Kanna Utsugi (Shiina Natsukawa); Kotetsu Katsura (Natsumi Hioka)	KMM-dan dan'inbangō no uta. Reprise - KMM's Counter Attack (KMM団団員番号のうた。リプライズ - KMM's Counter Attack)	TV anime Witch Craft Works character song CD
2014	X Maiden: Released: September 24; Label: Lambert co.; Format: Digital	Jun Akamaru (Maaya Uchida); Aoi Tachibana (Yuko Iida); Midori Hagino (Yuiko Tatsumi); Wanderlei Zillminnko (Mako)	forbidden Code	Web anime X Maiden ending theme
2015	THE IDOLM@STER CINDERELLA MASTER 034 Kanade Hayami (THE IDOLM@STER CINDERELLA MASTER 034 速水奏): Released: February 4; Label: Columbia Records; Format: CD	Kanade Hayami (Yuko Iida)	Hotel Moonside	THE iDOLM@STER Cinderella Girls Character song CD
2015	THE IDOLM@STER CINDERELLA GIRLS Hotel Moonside（Extended Live Version）: Released: December 24; Label: Columbia Records; Format: Digital	Kanade Hayami (Yuko Iida)	Hotel Moonside（Extended Live Version）	THE iDOLM@STER Cinderella Girls Special Live version single release
2016	THE IDOLM@STER CINDERELLA GIRLS STARLIGHT MASTER 02 Tulip: Released: May 18; Label: Columbia Records; Format: CD	Kanade Hayami (Yuko Iida); Syuko Shiomi (Ru Thing); Mika Jougasaki (Haruka Yoshimura); Frederica Miyamoto (Asami Takano); Shiki Ichinose (Kotomi Aihara)	Tulip (M@STER VERSION)	From THE iDOLM@STER Cinderella Girls Starlight Stage mobile game
2016	THE IDOLM@STER CINDERELLA MASTER Cool Jewelries! 003: Released: June 29; Label: Columbia Records; Format: CD	Fumika Sagisawa (M・A・O); Kanade Hayami (Yuko Iida); Arisu Tachibana (Amina Sato); Syuko Shiomi (Ru Thing); Asuka Ninomiya (Shiki Aoki)	Saite Jewel (咲いてJewel)	Related to THE iDOLM@STER Cinderella Girls
2016	THE IDOLM@STER CINDERELLA MASTER Cool Jewelries! 003: Released: June 29; Label: Columbia Records; Format: CD	Fumika Sagisawa (M・A・O); Kanade Hayami (Yuko Iida); Arisu Tachibana (Amina Sato); Syuko Shiomi (Ru Thing); Asuka Ninomiya (Shiki Aoki)	Near to You	Related to THE iDOLM@STER Cinderella Girls
2016	THE IDOLM@STER CINDERELLA MASTER Cool Jewelries! 003: Released: June 29; Label: Columbia Records; Format: CD	Kanade Hayami (Yuko Iida)	Kanade (奏（かなで）)	Related to THE iDOLM@STER Cinderella Girls
2016	THE IDOLM@STER CINDERELLA GIRLS 4thLIVE TriCastle Story Starlight Castle Venue Original CD: Released: September 2; Label: Columbia Records; Format: CD	Kanade Hayami (Yuko Iida)	Tulip (M@STER VERSION) Kanade Hayami solo remix	Related to THE iDOLM@STER Cinderella Girls Starlight Stage mobile game. Solo remix of group song.
2017	Witch Craft Works THE BEST 〜Japanese Edition〜 (Witch Craft Works THE BEST 〜日本語盤〜): Released: February 1; Label: Lantis; Format: CD	KMM team (KMM団): Tanpopo Kuraishi (Shiori Izawa); Mei Menowa (Yuko Iida); Rin Kazari (Momo Asakura); Kanna Utsugi (Shiina Natsukawa); Kotetsu Katsura (Natsumi Hioka)	Witch☆Activity〜[k]momimi NON STOP Ver.2.0HD〜 (ウィッチ☆アクティビティ〜[k]momimi NON STOP Ver.2.0HD〜)	Related to the Witch Craft Works TV anime
2017	Witch Craft Works THE BEST 〜Japanese Edition〜 (Witch Craft Works THE BEST 〜日本語盤〜): Released: February 1; Label: Lantis; Format: CD	KMM team (KMM団): Tanpopo Kuraishi (Shiori Izawa); Mei Menowa (Yuko Iida); Rin Kazari (Momo Asakura); Kanna Utsugi (Shiina Natsukawa); Kotetsu Katsura (Natsumi Hioka)	KEMOMOMISM	Song used in the Witch Craft Works pachislot
2017	THE IDOLM@STER CINDERELLA GIRLS STARLIGHT MASTER 11 Ankira!?Kyōsō kyoku (THE IDOLM@STER CINDERELLA GIRLS STARLIGHT MASTER 11 あんきら!?狂騒曲): Released: May 31; Label: Columbia Records; Format: CD	Mayu Sakuma (Yui Makino); Sae Kobayakawa (Rika Tachibana); Yukari Mizumoto (Akane Fujita); Kanako Mimura (Yuka Otsubo); Kanade Hayami (Yuko Iida)	Aikurushii (あいくるしい)	From THE iDOLM@STER Cinderella Girls Starlight Stage mobile game
2017	THE IDOLM@STER CINDERELLA GIRLS STARLIGHT MASTER 14 Jōnetsu Fan Fanfāre (THE IDOLM@STER CINDERELLA GIRLS STARLIGHT MASTER 14 情熱ファンファンファーレ): Released: November 8; Label: Columbia Records; Format: CD	Kaede Takagaki (Saori Hayami); Mizuki Kawashima (Nao Tōyama); Ryo Matsunaga (Haruka Chisuga); Kanade Hayami (Yuko Iida); Minami Nitta (Aya Suzaki)	Nocturne	From THE iDOLM@STER Cinderella Girls Starlight Stage mobile game
2017	THE IDOLM@STER CINDERELLA GIRLS LITTLE STARS! Akimeite Ding Dong Dang! (THE IDOLM@STER CINDERELLA GIRLS LITTLE STARS! 秋めいて Ding Dong Dang!): Released: December 6; Label: Columbia Records; Format: CD	Anastasia (Sumire Uesaka); Chie Sasaki (Asaka Imai); Kanade Hayami (Yuko Iida); Karen Hojo (Mai Fuchigami); Minami Nitta (Aya Suzaki)	Akimeite Ding Dong Dang! (秋めいて Ding Dong Dang!)	From THE iDOLM@STER Cinderella Girls Gekijō TV anime
2017	THE IDOLM@STER CINDERELLA GIRLS MASTER SEASONS! WINTER!: Released: December 13; Label: Columbia Records; Format: CD	Miho Kohinata (Minami Tsuda); Mika Jougasaki (Haruka Yoshimura); Kanade Hayami (Yuko Iida)	Twintail no Kaze (ツインテールの風)	From THE iDOLM@STER Cinderella Girls Starlight Stage mobile game
2018	THE IDOLM@STER CINDERELLA GIRLS STARLIGHT MASTER 18 Mouretsu☆Yonaoshi Guilty! (THE IDOLM@STER CINDERELLA GIRLS STARLIGHT MASTER 18 モーレツ★世直しギルティ！): Released: June 20; Label: Columbia Records; Format: CD	Kanade Hayami (Yuko Iida)	if	CD related to THE iDOLM@STER Cinderella Girls Starlight Stage mobile game. Second character song.
2018	THE IDOLM@STER CINDERELLA GIRLS 6thLIVE MERRY-GO-ROUNDOME!!! MASTER SEASONS WINTER! SOLO REMIX: Released: November 30; Label: Columbia Records; Format: CD	Kanade Hayami (Yuko Iida)	Twintail no Kaze Kanade Hayami solo remix (ツインテールの風 速水奏ソロ・リミックス)	Related to THE iDOLM@STER Cinderella Girls Starlight Stage mobile game. Solo remix of group song.
2019	THE IDOLM@STER CINDERELLA GIRLS STARLIGHT MASTER 31 Pretty Liar: Released: August 14; Label: Columbia Records; Format: CD	Kaede Takagaki (Saori Hayami); Kanade Hayami (Yuko Iida)	Pretty Liar（M@STER VERSION)	From THE iDOLM@STER Cinderella Girls Starlight Stage mobile game
2019	THE IDOLM@STER CINDERELLA GIRLS STARLIGHT MASTER 34 Sunshine See May: Released: December 11; Label: Columbia Records; Format: CD	Arisu Tachibana (Amina Sato); Kanade Hayami (Yuko Iida)	Sayonara Bus (サヨナラバス)	From THE iDOLM@STER Cinderella Girls Starlight Stage mobile game
2019	THE IDOLM@STER CINDERELLA GIRLS STARLIGHT MASTER for the NEXT! 04 Secret Daybreak: Released: December 25; Label: Columbia Records; Format: CD	Kanade Hayami (Yuko Iida); Minami Nitta (Aya Suzaki)	Secret Daybreak（M@STER VERSION）	From THE iDOLM@STER Cinderella Girls Starlight Stage mobile game
2019	THE IDOLM@STER CINDERELLA GIRLS STARLIGHT MASTER for the NEXT! 04 Secret Daybreak: Released: December 25; Label: Columbia Records; Format: CD	Kanade Hayami (Yuko Iida)	Secret Daybreak（M@STER VERSION）Kanade Hayami solo remix	From THE iDOLM@STER Cinderella Girls Starlight Stage mobile game
2020	THE IDOLM@STER CINDERELLA GIRLS Live Broadcast 24magic ~Cinderella-tachi no 24-jikan namahōsō!〜 Original CD (THE IDOLM@STER CINDERELLA GIRLS Live Broadcast 24magic 〜シンデレラたちの24時間生放送！〜 オリジナルCD): Released: October 7; Label: Columbia Records; Format: CD	Kanade Hayami (Yuko Iida)	Pretty Liar（M@STER VERSION) Kanade Hayami solo remix	CD related to THE iDOLM@STER Cinderella Girls Starlight Stage mobile game. Solo remix of group song.
2021	THE IDOLM@STER CINDERELLA GIRLS LITTLE STARS EXTRA! Kimi no Stage Isshou, Hontou wa... (THE IDOLM@STER CINDERELLA GIRLS LITTLE STARS EXTRA! 君のステージ衣装、本当は...): Released: February 3; Label: Columbia Records; Format: CD	Kanade Hayami (Yuko Iida); Chiyo Shirayuki (Risa Sekiguchi); Yukimi Sajo (Mina Nakazawa); Risa Matoba (Hana Tamegai); Hina Araki (Rui Tanabe)	Kimi no Stage Isshou, Hontou wa... (君のステージ衣装、本当は...)	From THE iDOLM@STER Cinderella Girls Starlight Stage mobile game
2022	THE IDOLM@STER CINDERELLA GIRLS STARLIGHT MASTER R/LOCK ON! 01 Seikan Sekai (THE IDOLM@STER CINDERELLA GIRLS STARLIGHT MASTER R/LOCK ON! 01 星環世界): Released: January 12; Label: Columbia Records; Format: CD	Akira Sunazuka (Miyu Tomita); Kanade Hayami (Yuko Iida); Kaede Takagaki (Saori Hayami); Chieri Ogata (Naomi Ozora); Hinako Kita (Seria Fukagawa); Frederica Miyamoto (Asami Takano); Yumi Aiba (Juri Kimura); Yuka Nakano (Shimoji Shino); Sanae Katagiri (Azumi Waki)	Seikan Sekai (M@STER VERSION) (星環世界（M@STER VERSION）)	From THE iDOLM@STER Cinderella Girls Starlight Stage mobile game
2022	THE IDOLM@STER CINDERELLA GIRLS STARLIGHT MASTER R/LOCK ON! 01 Seikan Sekai (THE IDOLM@STER CINDERELLA GIRLS STARLIGHT MASTER R/LOCK ON! 01 星環世界): Released: January 12; Label: Columbia Records; Format: CD	Kanade Hayami (Yuko Iida)	Seikan Sekai (M@STER VERSION) Kanade Hayami solo remix (星環世界（M@STER VERSION）速水奏ソロリミックス)	From THE iDOLM@STER Cinderella Girls Starlight Stage mobile game
2022	Flying High featuring Pawachans (Flying High featuring パワちゃんず): Released: January 16; Label: Konami Digital Entertainment; Format: Digital	Pawachans (パワちゃんず): Pa-chan (Fūka Izumi); Wa-chan (Yuko Iida)	Flying High featuring Pawachans (Flying High featuring パワちゃんず)	Digital EP related to Power Pros mobile game
2022	Flying High featuring Pawachans (Flying High featuring パワちゃんず): Released: January 16; Label: Konami Digital Entertainment; Format: Digital	Wa-chan (Yuko Iida)	Flying High feat. Pawachans (Wa-chan(CV.Yuko Iida) Version) (Flying High feat. パワちゃんず (ワーちゃん(CV飯田友子)Version))	Digital EP related to Power Pros mobile game
2022	Fairy-AID CD Theater vol.5 Arisa: Released: July 10; Label: Project Fairy-AID; Format: CD	Lily Garden (リリーガーデン): Hiiragi Fueha (Ru Thing); Sara Makishima (Yuko Iida)	Ai wa daijōbu~Will Be Alright~ (愛は大丈夫~Will Be Alright~)	Featured song from the 5th volume of the Fairy-AID CD drama series
2023	THE IDOLM@STER CINDERELLA GIRLS STARLIGHT MASTER R/LOCK ON! 12 No One Knows: Released: January 11; Label: Columbia Records; Format: CD	Makino Yagami (Yui Ninomiya); Kanade Hayami (Yuko Iida); Hina Araki (Rui Tanabe); Karen Hojo (Mai Fuchigami)	No One Knows（M@STER VERSION)	From THE iDOLM@STER Cinderella Girls Starlight Stage mobile game
2023	THE IDOLM@STER CINDERELLA GIRLS STARLIGHT MASTER R/LOCK ON! 12 No One Knows: Released: January 11; Label: Columbia Records; Format: CD	Kanade Hayami (Yuko Iida)	No One Knows（M@STER VERSION) Kanade Hayami solo remix	From THE iDOLM@STER Cinderella Girls Starlight Stage mobile game
2023	THE IDOLM@STER M@STERS OF IDOL WORLD!!!!! 2023 Ashita Kimi ni Jewel (THE IDOLM@STER M@STERS OF IDOL WORLD!!!!! 2023 明日きみにJewel): Released: February 11; Label: Columbia Records; Format: CD	Kanade Hayami (Yuko Iida)	Saite Jewel Kanade Hayami solo remix (咲いてJewel 速水奏ソロリミックス)	Venue CD containing solo remixes of songs from THE iDOLM@STER Cinderella Girls Starlight Stage mobile game
2023	THE IDOLM@STER CINDERELLA GIRLS U149 ANIMATION MASTER 03 Nightwear: Released: May 24; Label: Columbia Records; Format: CD	Kanade Hayami (Yuko Iida); Syuko Shiomi (Ru Thing); Mika Jougasaki (Haruka Yoshimura); Frederica Miyamoto (Asami Takano); Shiki Ichinose (Kotomi Aihara)	Nightwear (M@STER VERSION)	From THE iDOLM@STER Cinderella Girls Starlight Stage mobile game
2023	THE IDOLM@STER CINDERELLA GIRLS U149 ANIMATION MASTER 03 Nightwear: Released: May 24; Label: Columbia Records; Format: CD	Kanade Hayami (Yuko Iida)	Nightwear (M@STER VERSION) Kanade Hayami solo remix	From THE iDOLM@STER Cinderella Girls Starlight Stage mobile game
2023	THE IDOLM@STER CINDERELLA GIRLS Shout out Live!!! Original Venue CD: Released: September 9; Label: Columbia Records; Format: CD	Kanade Hayami (Yuko Iida)	Kimi no Stage Isshou, Hontou wa... Kanade Hayami solo remix (君のステージ衣装、本当は... 速水奏ソロリミックス)	Venue CD containing the solo remix of the featured song on the THE iDOLM@STER Cinderella Girls Gekijō Extra Stage web anime
2024	THE IDOLM@STER CINDERELLA GIRLS STARLIGHT MASTER HEART TICKER! 03 HALLOWEEN GAME: Released: February 14; Label: Columbia Records; Format: CD	Frederica Miyamoto (Asami Takano); Kanade Hayami (Yuko Iida)	Mystery Heart (ミステリーハート)	From THE iDOLM@STER Cinderella Girls Starlight Stage mobile game
2024	THE IDOLM@STER CINDERELLA GIRLS STARLIGHT MASTER HEART TICKER! 04 D-ark L-ily's Grin: Released: March 20; Label: Columbia Records; Format: CD	Karen Hojo (Mai Fuchigami); Kanade Hayami (Yuko Iida)	D-ark L-ily's Grin（M@STER VERSION）	From THE iDOLM@STER Cinderella Girls Starlight Stage mobile game
2024	THE IDOLM@STER CINDERELLA GIRLS STARLIGHT MASTER HEART TICKER! 04 D-ark L-ily's Grin: Released: March 20; Label: Columbia Records; Format: CD	Kanade Hayami (Yuko Iida)	D-ark L-ily's Grin（M@STER VERSION） Kanade Hayami solo remix	From THE iDOLM@STER Cinderella Girls Starlight Stage mobile game
2024	THE IDOLM@STER M@STER EXPO Original Venue CD [Cinderella Girls]: Released: December 14; Label: Columbia Records; Format: CD	Kanade Hayami (Yuko Iida)	Dance Dance Dance Kanade Hayami solo remix (ダンス・ダンス・ダンス 速水奏 ソロ・リミックス)	Venue CD containing the solo remix of one of the songs performed on the day 2 setlist

=== As herself ===
Year	Album details	Interpreters	Song	Notes
2018	CINDERELLA PARTY! Derepa Ondo \Dondonka/ (CINDERELLA PARTY！でれぱ音頭 \ドンドンカッ/): Released: August 1; Label: Columbia Records; Format: CD	Sayuri Hara; Ruriko Aoki; Yuko Iida	Over Drive (sung by: Sayuri Hara, Ruriko Aoki, and Yuko Iida from CINDERELLA PARTY!)	CD containing songs performed by the CINDERELLA PARTY! radio program's hosts, along with some of their guests

== Live & Event performances ==
Year	Date	Performance	Notes
2013	April 28	NicoNico Anison Fes	As Saki Iwasawa from Aiura
2013	August 25	Animelo Summer Live 2013 -FLAG NINE- (Day 2)	As Saki Iwasawa from Aiura
2015	November 29	THE IDOLM@STER Cinderella Girls 3rdLIVE Cinderella no Butoukai - Power of Smile - (Day 2)	As Kanade Hayami from THE IDOLM@STER Cinderella Girls
2016	February 28	CINDERELLA REAL PARTY! 03 ~Atsumare! Producer Suteki na Parade in Ranran Hall~	As Kanade Hayami from THE IDOLM@STER Cinderella Girls
2016	August 26	Animelo Summer Live 2016 -TOKI- (Day 1)	As Kanade Hayami from THE IDOLM@STER Cinderella Girls
2016	October 15	THE IDOLM@STER Cinderella Girls 4thLIVE TriCastle Story SSA -Brand New Castle- (Day 1)	As Kanade Hayami from THE IDOLM@STER Cinderella Girls
2017	May 27–28	THE IDOLM@STER Cinderella Girls 5thLIVE TOUR Serendipity Parade!!! @ISHIKAWA	As Kanade Hayami from THE IDOLM@STER Cinderella Girls
2017	June 30	Anisong World Matsuri ～Japan Kawaii Live～ (2017)	As Kanade Hayami from THE IDOLM@STER Cinderella Girls
2017	July 29–30	THE IDOLM@STER Cinderella Girls 5thLIVE TOUR Serendipity Parade!!! @FUKUOKA	As Kanade Hayami from THE IDOLM@STER Cinderella Girls
2017	August 13	THE IDOLM@STER Cinderella Girls 5thLIVE TOUR Serendipity Parade!!! @SSA (Day 2)	As Kanade Hayami from THE IDOLM@STER Cinderella Girls
2017	November 19	THE IDOLM@STER Cinderella Girls 6th Anniversary Memorial Party	As Kanade Hayami from THE IDOLM@STER Cinderella Girls
2018	April 29	Princess Principal STAGE OF MISSION	As Gazelle from Princess Principal
2018	July 7	Anisong World Matsuri ～Japan Kawaii Live～ (2018)	As Kanade Hayami from THE IDOLM@STER Cinderella Girls
2018	August 12	MOTTO ANISONG FESTIVAL 2018	As Kanade Hayami from THE IDOLM@STER Cinderella Girls
2018	November 10–11	THE IDOLM@STER Cinderella Girls 6thLIVE MERRY-GO-ROUNDOME!!! MetLife Dome	As Kanade Hayami from THE IDOLM@STER Cinderella Girls
2018	December 16	THE IDOLM@STER Cinderella Girls 7th Anniversary Memorial STAGE!!	As Kanade Hayami from THE IDOLM@STER Cinderella Girls
2019	October 20	BANDAI NAMCO Entertainment Festival (Day 2)	As Kanade Hayami from THE IDOLM@STER Cinderella Girls
2019	November 10–11	THE IDOLM@STER Cinderella Girls 7thLIVE TOUR Special 3chord♪ Funky Dancing!	As Kanade Hayami from THE IDOLM@STER Cinderella Girls
2019	November 16	NHK's SHIBUYA NOTE - LiPPS TV appearance	As Kanade Hayami from THE IDOLM@STER Cinderella Girls
2020	November 28	THE IDOLM@STER Cinderella Girls 9th Anniversary Memorial Party	As Kanade Hayami from THE IDOLM@STER Cinderella Girls
2021	January 9	THE IDOLM@STER Cinderella Girls Broadcast & Live Happy New Yell!!! (Day 1)	As Kanade Hayami from THE IDOLM@STER Cinderella Girls
2021	December 25–26	THE IDOLM@STER Cinderella Girls 10th ANNIVERSARY M@GICAL WONDERLAND TOUR!!! CosmoStar Land	As Kanade Hayami from THE IDOLM@STER Cinderella Girls
2022	April 2–3	THE IDOLM@STER Cinderella Girls 10th ANNIVERSARY M@GICAL WONDERLAND TOUR!!! M@GICAL WONDERLAND!!!	As Kanade Hayami from THE IDOLM@STER Cinderella Girls
2022	November 26–27	THE IDOLM@STER Cinderella Girls Twinkle LIVE Constellation Gradation	As Kanade Hayami from THE IDOLM@STER Cinderella Girls
2023	June 10–11	THE IDOLM@STER Cinderella Girls Kagayaki Yomatsuri	As Kanade Hayami from THE IDOLM@STER Cinderella Girls
2023	September 9–10	THE IDOLM@STER Cinderella Girls Shout out Live!!!	As Kanade Hayami from THE IDOLM@STER Cinderella Girls
2023	December 9	Ijigen Fes IDOLM@STER★♥Love Live! Uta Gassen (Day 1)	As Kanade Hayami from THE IDOLM@STER Cinderella Girls
2024	February 3	THE IDOLM@STER Cinderella Girls UNIT LIVE TOUR ～ConnecTrip!～ Yamagata performance	As Kanade Hayami from THE IDOLM@STER Cinderella Girls
