= Betrayed by the Hero, I Formed a MILF Party with His Mom! =

Japanese web novel series

- First light novel volume cover

勇者に全部奪われた俺は勇者の母親とパーティを組みました！ (Yūsha ni Zenbu Ubawareta Ore wa Yūsha no Hahaoya to Pāti o Kumimashita!)
- Genre: Harem; Isekai; Romantic comedy
- Novel series
- Written by: Yassan Ishino
- Published by: Kakuyomu
- Original run: June 5, 2022 – present
- Manga
- Written by: Yassan Ishino
- Illustrated by: Makoto Kuon
- Published by: Media Factory
- English publisher: NA: Seven Seas Entertainment
- Imprint: MF Comics
- Magazine: KadoComi
- Original run: December 23, 2022 – present
- Volumes: 8
- Light novel
- Written by: Yassan Ishino
- Illustrated by: Makoto Kuon
- Published by: Enterbrain
- Imprint: Famitsu Bunko
- Original run: April 26, 2024 – present
- Volumes: 5

Betrayed by the Hero, I Formed a MILF Party with His Mom! (勇者に全部奪われた俺は勇者の母親とパーティを組みました！, Yūsha ni Zenbu Ubawareta Ore wa Yūsha no Hahaoya Pāti o Kumimashita!) is a Japanese web novel series written by Yassan Ishino. It began serialization on Kadokawa Corporation's Kakuyomu website in June 2022. A manga adaptation illustrated by Makoto Kuon began serialization on Kadokawa Corporation's KadoComi manga website in December 2022. A light novel adaptation began publication under Enterbrain's Famitsu Bunko imprint in April 2024.

== Synopsis ==
Ceres is a young man who in his previous reincarnation was a Japanese man in his 40s. Ceres becomes a member of his childhood friend Zect's Heroes Party, but is later removed from the party. After being kicked out, Ceres spots Zect's mother Shizuko being sold into slavery, and buys her. Ceres has long held feelings for Shizuko since his youth, and decides to ask her if she could form a party with him. His party later adds the mothers of the members of his former party.

== Characters ==
Ceres (セレス, Seresu)
Shizuko (静子)
Voiced by: Noriko Shibasaki (PV)
Haruka (ハルカ)
Sayo (サヨ)
Voiced by: Masumi Tazawa (PV)
Misaki (ミサキ)
Voiced by: Ru Thing (PV)

== Media ==
=== Manga ===
Written by Yassan Ishino, Betrayed by the Hero, I Formed a MILF Party with His Mom! began serialization on Kadokawa Corporation's Kakuyomu website on June 5, 2022. A manga adaptation illustrated by Makoto Kuon began serialization on Kadokawa Corporation's KadoComi manga website on December 23, 2022. The manga's chapters have been compiled into eight tankōbon volumes as of October 2026.

During its panel at Anime NYC 2024, Seven Seas Entertainment announced that they had licensed the series under their Steamship imprint for English publication beginning in May 2025.

No.	Original release date	Original ISBN	North American release date	North American ISBN
1	May 23, 2023	978-4-04-682490-5	May 6, 2025	979-8-89373-294-8
Chapters 1–5
2	November 22, 2023	978-4-04-682976-4	July 29, 2025	979-8-89373-337-2
Chapters 6–10; Bonus
3	April 23, 2024	978-4-04-683601-4	October 7, 2025	979-8-89373-601-4
Chapters 11–15; Bonus
4	October 23, 2024	978-4-04-683991-6	March 3, 2026	979-8-89561-204-0
Chapters 16–20; Bonus
5	April 23, 2025	978-4-04-684684-6	August 11, 2026	979-8-89765-130-6
Chapters 21–25; Bonus
6	October 23, 2025	978-4-04-685022-5	January 12, 2027	979-8-89765-589-2
7	April 23, 2026	978-4-04-685586-2	June 15, 2027	979-8-89863-466-7
8	October 23, 2026	978-4-04-660206-0	—	—
9	April 23, 2027	978-4-04-660897-0; 978-4-04-660898-7 (SE)	—	—

=== Light novel ===
A light novel version began publication under Enterbrain's Famitsu Bunko imprint on April 26, 2024. Five volumes have been released as of April 30, 2026.

No.	Release date	ISBN
1	April 26, 2024	978-4-04-737990-9
2	October 30, 2024	978-4-04-738125-4
3	April 30, 2025	978-4-04-738358-6
4	October 30, 2025	978-4-04-738638-9
5	April 30, 2026	978-4-04-500036-2

=== Other ===
The series has had four promotional videos commemorating the releases of the first, third and fourth volumes. The videos feature voice acting from Noriko Shibasaki, Masumi Tazawa, and Ru Thing.

== Reception ==
By October 2026, the series had over 1.5 million copies in circulation.
