= Yuko Iida =

Japanese voice actress (born 1992)

- 飯田 友子
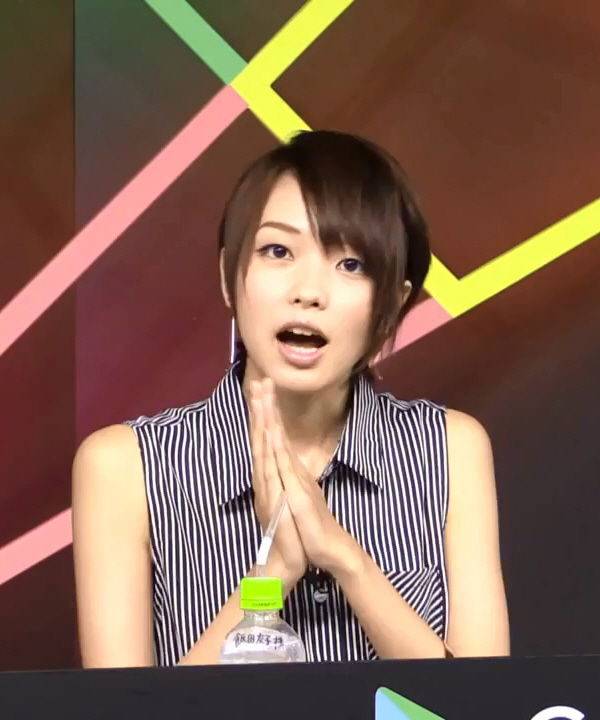
- Yuko Iida at the 2016 Summer Google Play Game Fest
- Born: September 9, 1992 (age 34); Kanagawa, Japan
- Other names: Iidashi (飯田氏), Ōji (王子)
- Occupation: Voice actress
- Years active: 2011–present
- Agent: I'm Enterprise
- Height: 162 cm (5 ft 4 in)
- Website: Yuko Iida @ I'm Enterprise

Yuko Iida (飯田 友子, Iida Yūko; born September 9, 1992) is a Japanese voice actress affiliated with I'm Enterprise. She is best known for her roles as Kanade Hayami in THE IDOLM@STER Cinderella Girls, Saki Iwasawa in Aiura, Mei Menowa in Witch Craft Works, Gazelle in Princess Principal, Azumi in Girls und Panzer, Kyoko Kurihara in MF Ghost, as well as Kirarin Penguin and Mitsuko Okuma in Wonderful Pretty Cure!.

== Biography ==
Youngest of 3 siblings, Iida became interested in voice acting from an early age, citing she specially admired female voice actors who had male characters roles, and mentions Ranma ½, Digimon and Cardcaptor Sakura as some of the works that piqued her interest in voice acting. She has also talked about how she enjoyed dubbing the characters from the manga she was reading from a young age. She became a member of her current voice talent agency I'm Enterprise in April 2010, and she graduated from the Japan Narration Acting Institute (日本ナレーション演技研究所) in 2014 after being enrolled for 6 years, which she had been attended since she was a high school student. She has also discussed how she had worked in multiple part-time jobs, including fast food restaurants and bars during that time after graduating from junior high school, where she worked for five or six years until she got a regular role in an anime for the first time.

Iida got her first main role as Saki Iwasawa in the 2013 anime Aiura and joined the cast of the 2014 TV anime adaptation of Witch Craft Works as one of the main support characters, Mei Menowa. On November 19, 2014, she was announced as the voice actress of THE IDOLM@STER Cinderella Girls character, Kanade Hayami, which led her to be a recurring member of the franchise's plentiful activities, such as mobile games, TV and web anime, music releases and live performances. While being busy with the aforementioned franchise's activities, Iida has been in charge of giving voice to numerous characters in anime-related media, such as TV series, films, videogames, and other media works.

Aside from her voice acting work, Iida has also been involved in different projects along with some of her I'm Enterprise peers. A variety program with fellow I'm Enterprise voice actress, Asami Takano named Iida Yuko · Takano Asami no marutto 360-do (飯田友子・髙野麻美のまるっと360度; lit. Yuko Iida & Asami Takano's 360 degrees in its entirety) used to be broadcast on NicoNico and ran irregularly from October 27, 2016, to July 27, 2023. The pair would do various fun activities both in-studio and outside while recording them with a 360º camera to later rewatch it and go over it on the actual program. Two special programs were released exclusively on CD. A radio program with fellow I'm Enterprise voice actresses, Ru Thing and Asami Takano, named Lumine-san (ル美子さん) was broadcast every Wednesday on NicoNico and YouTube at 18:00 JST from March 20, 2019, until the last episode on September 9, 2022. On November 4, 2019, the radio program Iida Yuko · Murai Misato no Okyakusama wo Yorokoba Setai! (飯田友子・村井美里のお客様を喜ばせたい！; lit. Yuko Iida and Misato Murai want to please their customers!) started being broadcast biweekly on the Onsen Internet Radio Station after Iida formed a musical duo with fellow I'm Enterprise voice actress Misato Murai named KANPAI in which they both sing and play guitar. The radio program ran until January 13, 2020, and they have also performed together in several shows and live streamings.

Some of Iida's hobbies include watching movies and theater plays, motorcycle touring, and she is also a big enthusiast of baseball. She is broadly referred to as Iidashi (飯田氏) which comes from the nickname Iidashippe (いいだしっぺ) that was given to her at CINDERELLA PARTY!'s 18th episode when the participants started coming up with nicknames. Later on, her nickname Ōji (王子; lit. prince) was given to her by fellow THE iDOLM@STER Cinderella Girls voice actress Amina Sato, which has always been nicknamed as Hime (姫; lit. princess) after Iida went out of her way to help her ease her nerves right before their first live performance at The Idolmaster Cinderella Girls 3rd live. She announced her marriage with someone outside the entertainment industry on January 5, 2022.
