= 18if =

Japanese anime television series

- 18if key visual
- Genre: Supernatural
- Anime television series
- Directed by: Various (Note: Chief supervision (総監修) by Koji Morimoto.)
- Produced by: Atsushi Yoshikawa; Hirotaka Kaneko; Shinji Ōmori; Hiroo Saitō; Shunsuke Tsuburai; Takaya Inoue; Masahiro Saitō; Yoshinori Takeeda; Masayoshi Ozawa (#7)
- Written by: Atsuhiro Tomioka
- Music by: Ryūdai Abe; Hitoshi Sakimoto (#7); Hitomi Kuroishi (#7); Noriaki Kihara (#10)
- Studio: Gonzo
- Licensed by: Crunchyroll (Note: In North America through Crunchyroll, LLC (formerly known as Funimation).)
- Original network: Tokyo MX, AT-X, BS Fuji
- Original run: July 7, 2017 – September 29, 2017
- Episodes: 13

18if is a Japanese anime television series produced by Gonzo. It aired from July 7 to September 29, 2017.

It is part of the media franchise The Art of 18, which also includes a smartphone game by Mobcast titled 18: Kimi to Tsunagaru Puzzle (【18】キミト ツナガル パズル, 18: Kimi to Tsunagaru Pazuru) for Android and iOS.

== Summary ==
Haruto Tsukishiro wakes up in a dream world dominated by strange and powerful entities called "Witches". To survive, he gets the assistance of research professor Katsumi Kanzaki and a mysterious white-haired girl called "Lily". With their help, Haruto must outsmart the witches and find a way to return to the real world.

== Characters ==
=== Protagonists ===
Haruto Tsukishiro (月城 遥人, Tsukishiro Haruto)
Voiced by: Nobunaga Shimazaki (Japanese); Ricco Fajardo (English)
Haruto was trapped in the dream world and worked with Lily and Professor Kanzaki, trying to return to the real world. At the end of the anime, it was revealed that in truth, Haruto was in an accident of unknown origin (Even Haruto himself did not remember it) and had been in a coma for years. In the end, Haruto left with the reformed Eve through the door to God's Domain, while his body in the waking world dies. The finale implies he was Eve's long-lost Adam.
Katsumi Kanzaki (神崎 カツミ, Kanzaki Katsumi)
Voiced by: Takehito Koyasu (Japanese); J. Michael Tatum (English)
A scientist who investigates the dream world. Kanzaki saw Haruto's journey as an opportunity to further his research. He had a second agenda: His younger sister, Yurina, was a victim of Sleeping Beauty Syndrome, and while working to research the dream world as well as Haruto, he was trying to awaken her. Inside the dream world, Kanzaki takes the form of an anthropomorphic cat.
Lily (リリィ, Rirī)
Voiced by: Kaori Nazuka (Japanese); Alexis Tipton (English)
A mysterious girl Haruto met inside the dream world. For some reason, only Haruto can see her until episode 10 onwards, when Katsumi is able to see and hear her though the use of special glasses. At the end of the anime, it is revealed that Lily's true identity is Eve, or rather the Aspect of Eve before she was corrupted by eating from the Tree of Knowledge. She merges with Eve at the end of the series and leaves for God's Domain with Haruto.

=== Witches ===
Yuko Sakurabe (桜部 優子, Sakurabe Yūko)
Voiced by: Aya Endō (Japanese); Monica Rial (English)
The first Witch Haruto encounters in the dream world. Nicknamed the "Witch of Thunder", Yuko uses Haruto for her games and attempts to kill him when he refuses. With Lily's help, Haruto realizes Yuko is actually a girl who had her heart broken after a cruel joke and went to the dream world to escape from her problems. Haruto helps Yuko move on from her suffering and allows her to return to the real world.
Mana Hayashida (林田真奈, Hayashida Mana)
Voiced by: Yū Shimamura (Japanese); Morgan Lauré (English)
The second Witch Haruto encounters in the dream world. A survivor of a brutal home invasion/murder while she was 12, she wishes to bring justice to the three who killed her family who died protecting her even though she feels she did not deserve their affection. When facing the third killer (the brains), Haruto steps in and kills him as he discovers he was the most dangerous of the three. She wakes up wanting to meet her protector in the real world when she gets out of the hospital.
Kayo Sugisaki (杉崎佳世, Sugisaki Kayo)
Voiced by: Nao Tamura (Japanese); Jeannie Tirado (English)
The third Witch Haruto encounters in the dream world. A terminally sick girl who desires to live a normal highschool life, but unable to do so due to her bad health and terminal stage, cursing her own state. Haruto encounters her in the dream world and the two enjoy normal life, affairs such as shopping or playing. She falls in love with Haruto and passes away grateful to him. Later on, it's revealed that a part of her soul remained behind in concern for Haruto. Kayo is key in finding Haruto's comatose body and finding out the truth behind his state. She and the other 10 witches return to help him save Eve's soul. She is also called the "Witch of First Love".
Airi Kojima (小嶋アイリ, Kojima Airi)
Voiced by: Ai Kakuma (Japanese); Caitlin Glass (English)
The fourth Witch Haruto encounters in the dream world. An amateur model who was dumped by her boyfriend over a slimmer underclassman model. She develops an unhealthy relationship with food, becoming bulimic following the event, putting her love of food against keeping a better figure at odds. Through Haruto's help, she's able to regain her joy of eating food normally and seeks a new love in Haruto. She is also called the "Witch of Gluttony".
Mirei Saegusa (三枝美玲, Saegusa Mirei)
Voiced by: Azumi Asakura (Japanese); Tia Ballard (English)
The fifth Witch Haruto encounters in the dream world.
Natsuki Kamikawa (上川 菜月, Kamikawa Natsuki)
Voiced by: Misato Fukuen (Japanese); Jill Harris (English)
The sixth Witch Haruto encounters in the dream world.
Nene Higashiyama (ネネ, Nene)
Voiced by: Inori Minase (Japanese); Lara Woodhull (English)
The seventh Witch Haruto encounters in the dream world.
Sono (ソノ, Sono)
Voiced by: Fumiko Orikasa (Japanese); Megan Shipman (English)
The eighth Witch Haruto encounters in the dream world.
Misaki (美咲, Misaki)
Voiced by: Emi Nitta (Japanese); Dawn M. Bennett (English)
The ninth Witch Haruto encounters in the dream world.
Hanako Sumitomo (住友花子, Sumitomo Hanako)
Voiced by: Shiho Nanba (Japanese); Bryn Apprill (English)
The tenth Witch Haruto encounters in the dream world.
Yurina Kanzaki (神崎ユリナ, Kanzaki Yurina)
Voiced by: Nao Tōyama (Japanese); Brina Palencia (English)
Katsumi's sister and the final Witch Haruto encounters in the dream world. A friend put her into an audition and as a result, she became a very famous idol, to the point that Misaki has stated that Yurina is the idol that she herself wanted to become. However, the pressures of stardom had worn her down until she was struck down with Sleeping Beauty Syndrome and chosen to be Eve's protector.

=== Others ===
Eve (イブ, Ibu)
Voiced by: Ayako Kawasumi (Japanese); Luci Christian (English)
The primary antagonist of the series. After exiled from Paradise, Eve fell into a deep slumber that led to the creation of the modern world. Her awakening threatens to destroy mankind, which she considers to be revenge against God for exiling her. The Witches are able to talk her out of destroying the world and she recognizes Lily as an alternate version of herself that didn't eat the forbidden fruit. After merging with Lily and becoming whole, she departs with Haruto into Heaven.

== Anime ==
18if is a Japanese anime television series produced by Gonzo. It aired from July 7 to September 29, 2017. Kōji Morimoto served as chief supervisor. Each episode featured a different director. Atsuhiro Tomioka handled the series composition, Hiroko Kazui served as design director, and Tadashi Oppata designed the characters. Ryūdai Abe composed the music. The opening theme is "Red Doors feat. Yoshikazu Mera" by TeddyLoid. Crunchyroll simulcast the series, while Funimation licensed the series for streaming and home video in North America.

No.	Title (Note: All English titles are taken from Funimation.)	Directed by	Written by	Episode director	Storyboards	Original release date
1	"The Witch of Thunder"; Transliteration: "Den'ei no Majo" (Japanese: 電影の魔女)	Akira Nishimori	Atsuhiro Tomioka	Akira Toba	Akira Nishimori	July 7, 2017
Haruto Tsukishiro awakens in a mysterious dream world inhabited by strange and powerful entities called Witches, the first of them being Yuko Sakurabe, the Witch of Thunder. Haruto's only sources of companionship are Lily, a white-haired girl that calls Haruto her "brother" and Katsumi Kanzaki, a scientist who has been researching the dream world. Yuko finds Haruto and attempts to convince him to play with her. At first, Haruto refuses, but when Kanzaki almost gets killed, he is forced to accept. His attempts to appease Yuko are for naught, as she attempts to kill him as well. Fortunately, Haruto realizes that any injuries he suffers in the dream world are not real, so he easily survives Yuko's attacks. With Lily's help, Haruto realizes Yuko is actually a sad, heartbroken girl who went to the dream world after suffering a cruel prank in the real world. Haruto helps Yuko come to terms with her pain and allows her to return to the real world. As Yuko wakes up, the dream world produces a blue door that, according to Kanzaki and Lily, will take Haruto back to the real world. But when Haruto goes through it, he is taken back to the room where the episode started. Haruto simply decides to sleep again, hoping to find another way to return home.
2	"Time Stopped at Age 12"; Transliteration: "Tomatta Jikan, Jūni-sai" (Japanese: 止まった時間、12才)	Akira Nishimori	Atsuhiro Tomioka	Kyōhei Suzuki	Akira Nishimori	July 14, 2017
Haruto has a frightening dream of a woman mercilessly killing someone grotesquely, and wakes up to find that Professor Katsumi confirms his dream to be true and that the Witch has killed someone. The professor explains that a crime occurred 10 years ago when a family of four was attacked in their home, but the youngest daughter survived by hiding in a closet while her parents and older sister were killed. The dream Haruto shared with the Witch was an image of one of the three killers getting murdered in the same way the mother was. Thus the greatest suspect is the youngest sister, who is also afflicted with a disorder called Sleeping Beauty Syndrome. As Haruto returns to the dream world, Professor Katsumi contacts the remaining two killers, who reveal they have had the same dream each time of themselves getting chased by red heels before being killed like how the father and older sister were. Due to fright, they have tried their best to remain awake, but one of them eventually gives in and is murdered in front of Haruto in the dream world, where he encounters the Witch. Seeing his friend decapitated in real life, the last person, the brains behind the murdering and the one who orchestrated everything, decides to go to sleep. However, this is all part of a plan for him to awaken his subconsciousness in the dream world, where he attempts to kill the Witch after finding out anything can happen in the dream world as long as you think it in your mind. Before the Witch is overpowered, Haruto steps in and kills the mastermind in the exact manner as how the Witch would want it to be. Thankful and satisfied that the killers were brought to justice, the Witch leaves the dream world and wakes up in the hospital wanting to meet Haruto and thank him properly.
3	"The Witch of First Love"; Transliteration: "Hatsukoi no Majo" (Japanese: 初恋の魔女)	Toshirō Fujii	Toshirō Fujii	Toshirō Fujii	Toshirō Fujii	July 21, 2017
The episode begins with a new freshman in high school named Kayo Sugisake starting her first day. Later, she wakes up and begins her day by walking to the park, with Haruto passing by on her way. She sees him again at the park and he sits down on the bench next to hers. Haruto begins to make conversation with Kayo but she begins coughing. When he asks her if she is alright, she becomes embarrassed and hurriedly insists she is fine, thanks him and runs off. Haruto later wakes up lying on the same bench and begins to walk up the road where he once again passes Kayo on her way to the park. Lily appears, pushing him to go back and talk to her. He begins with the same conversation. That night, Kayo has flashbacks of red lights, jumbled voices shouting, a siren and a brief flash of an image of surgeons surrounding her. She repeats her routine and heads to the park, and once again meets Haruto. They begin to bond over the cat, and eventually, after Kayo informs him she is frail in constitution and thus doesn't have the stamina to go far from her home or do much beyond her routine, he invites her to hang out with him the next day. They meet the next morning and he takes her out on a moped to the beach for the day, allowing her to enjoy the sand, shells and sparklers until after dark. That night, Lily returns, vaguely warning Haruto that Kayo is in some kind of need of help. The morning after, Kayo is anxious to see Haruto, and becomes overwhelmed until she collapses. She begins to have flashbacks of her own experiences with her real-life terminal illness and becomes frustrated, spurring on her transformation into a Witch. While she transforms, Kayo sees herself confined to a bed on a ventilator and remembers how after beginning high school her illness worsened to the point where she eventually was often absent from class, stuck in the infirmary. In her memories, she returns to her desk to find a flyer for a school festival she isn't well enough to attend. Haruto calls her name, pulling her out of her memories upon the completion of her transformation into the Witch of First Love. After the transformation, Haruto converses with Katsumi in his cat-avatar form, where he tells Haruto that the dream world will remain stable, but only for a short time. Along with her appearance, Kayo's demeanor changes into a fun-loving, excited girl with a strong enough physical constitution that she can choose to walk around the town. Every day afterward Kayo and Haruto do something new, exciting and fun. Finally, they visit her school, though she initially hesitates to go inside until he goes in first. Standing by her own desk, she begins to cry before sights and sounds of a school festival surround them, returning her to glee. He walks her home, though she doesn't appear to want to return there. Again, the next morning, Haruto meets with Kayo, though he notices her forehead is hot. Seemingly embarrassed again, she gets up to run away but she trips and falls. His increasing concern for her makes her laugh at him, confusing him. That night, Kayo contemplates on the relationship she's developing with Haruto, wondering if it constitutes as dating and getting flustered at the idea of kissing him when they get to her house. The next day, she resolves to give him a love letter she's written to him, but upon seeing him, the scene begins to play out like the morning before, only this time she gives him the letter. Just as he's about to take it, Kayo's dream world begins to crack, she collapses, and in the real world, her vitals begin to fail. Kayo in the dream searches for the letter, determined to get her feelings for Haruto out to him. She reveals to him that she was at the park and had eavesdropped on Haruto and Katsumi. She confesses she was happy to experience what it must be like to live a normal, healthy life and have a boyfriend to spend time with. She thanks him for the joy he's given her before, returning to her original high schooler form and confesses her love for him, hoping he remembers it and keeps her in his heart. He hugs her just as she disappears. He cries to the sunset after reading her letter, mourning her loss. In the real world, a smile is seen on Kayo's face as she passes away.
4	"The Witch of Gluttony"; Transliteration: "Bōshoku no Majo" (Japanese: 暴食の魔女)	Hiroko Kazui	Hiroko Kazui	Yoshiki Kitai	Hiroko Kazui	July 28, 2017
Airi Kojima is frivolously dumped by her boyfriend over a thinner model, degrading Airi's own modeling efforts as an amateur and making her feel bad about herself before casually walking away. She begins to binge and purge in an extremely unhealthy effort to slim down. In the dream world Haruto is enjoying curry with two other girls when suddenly The Witch of Gluttony bursts into the room and interrupts the meal, leaving everyone bewildered. She becomes irritated when he remarks how tiny she is and hurls massive doughnuts at him, and as he's pelted with one, he wakes up, still in the dream world. In the real world, Airi struggles to weigh herself, disappointed at her scale results. She heads to work at a coffee shop, a place whose curry rice is favoured by Katsumi. His enjoyment of the curry rice reminds her of her own inability to enjoy food the same way. In the dream world, Haruto wakes up to see Katsumi eating a box of doughnuts and pushing Haruto to eat one, irritating him until he kicks Katsumi out. Lily replaces him on the cough, also enjoying the box of doughnuts and proceeding to dance around the room similarly to Katsumi, singing about her love of doughnuts. She leaves through a red door, urning Haruto to come with her. Immediately upon entering the realm of the Witch of Gluttony, he is bombarded and chased by dozens of giant doughnuts. Deciding to go with it, he takes a chomp out of a doughnuts he lands on, noticing there's no taste to it. The Witch of Glutton proceeds to launch her "Candy Attack" at him, turning him into a doughnut that Lily reappears and begins to eat. At the same time, in the real world, Airi is beginning her binge. Hatusmi wakes up from his nightmare and finds a murmuring Lily sleeping in the same bed, but not for long, as when Katsumi shows up, she disappears from the bed. Katsumi puts Haruto back to sleep with his further ranting about curry. In his dream, Haruto enjoys the same curry meal with the same two girls. In the real world Airi wakes up and remembers her grandmother's curry Airi used to have often a child. She steps on the scale and laments how it shows she's gained weight. As her issues with belimia continue, Haruto has the same dream of being chased by candy and doughnuts with Lily initially having a blast beside him as he struggles, night after night until even Lily's eventually had enough. She leaves and Haruto becomes trapped in front of the Witch of Gluttony, who expresses a desire to eat whatever she wants while still maintaining her figure. She begins destroying the realm around them and Haruto falls into the same dream of eating curry, this time with a grown-up Airi and the Witch of Gluttony. Haruto asks why the Witch isn't eating, and she confesses she's not eating because she's concerned about gaining weight and explains the incident where she/Airi was dumped due to her weight. Haruto encourages her to try the curry, reassuring her that weight gain or loss isn't as important as enjoying the meal. The Witch of Gluttony tries a spoonful and remembers her/Airi's days as a little girl at her grandmother's house during the summers, and she is able to come to peace with herself and her love of food. That morning, in the real world, Airi returns for another shift at work, determined to start loving herself, and to find a significant other worthy of her love.
5	"The Witch of Ordinariness"; Transliteration: "Bon'yō no Majo" (Japanese: 凡庸の魔女)	Minoru Ōhara	Minoru Ōhara, Yoriko Tomita	Minoru Ōhara	Minoru Ōhara	August 4, 2017
6	"Curses Return Upon the Casters"; Transliteration: "Hito o Norowaba Ana Futatsu..." (Japanese: 人を呪わば穴二つ・・・)	Yukio Takahashi	Yukio Takahashi	Yukio Takahashi	Yukio Takahashi	August 11, 2017
7	"And now There are none..." Transliteration: "Soshite Dare mo Inai..." (Japanese: ソシテ ダレモ イナイ...)	Koichi Chigira	Koichi Chigira	Koichi Chigira, Kenichi Shirai	Koichi Chigira	August 18, 2017
Haruto wakes up as a scarecrow in the dream world. In the dream world a robot knocks on the door and shows him a picture with two boys and a girl. Kanzaki then appears as lion and tells Haruto that they are now in the dream world. The robot then asks Haruto to help him find Nene, the girl in the picture. He tells them that Nene is in the highest building but Haruto can not see it. So the robot pulls out a card from a deck, and transports them to somewhere. During this time, Kanzaki decides to call the robot Yoshitsune. While they are being teleported, a rabbit appears yelling extra extra and shows a newspaper about a Prince named Pol visiting a new country (assumed to be Japan). Once they finish teleporting, they arrive at the "space of joy". From there Haruto, Kanzaki, and Yoshitune witness a flashback/memory about prince Pol and his servant Pot going to a new school in Japan and meeting a girl named Nene. Remembering his mission, Yoshitune, then takes out another card and teleportes the group to the "space of pleasure". In this space, the three witness flashbacks of Prince Pol, Pot, and Nene saving a Koro the cat (Pot gets injured while saving Koro). The flashback then shows the three friends spending time together playing and building a play house. In the house Nene makes Pol promise to be a good and kind king who will fill his kingdom with sunshine (happiness). He agreed. At this point, the wind differently blows away a card and Haruto, Kanzaki, and Yoshitune are transported to the "space of grief". Here the three see a flashback of Koro being injured and in need of saving. Pol tries to rescue Koro, at the risk of getting hit by a car but his bodyguards save Pol in time at the cost of Koro's life. They then take Pol away and Pot and Nene are left morning Koro's death. As Pol is being taken away, A card drops and takes them to another place, filled with monitors. Haruto and Kanzaki are watching the monitors and see Yoshitune on them and realize he has been teleported somewhat else. Yoshitsune then hears and follows Nene's voice to a rocket where they meet and it is revealed that Yoshitsune is Pol. Kanzaki also realizes this, and then Lily shows up to watch what happens to. Pol is trying to talk to Nene about the past, but she is angry and accuses him if forgetting. They are interrupted buy a flashback which shows Pol being king and reading that his people are starving. He asks is advisors what does starving mean and they tell him it means people don't have enough to eat (at this time Pol is eating a massive meal by himself). He then replies that the starving people should eat cake then while Pot watches him sadly. Nene then says again "I want to meet you" and ask Pol if he still remembers. The scene then changes to several paintings/cards transforming into a guillotine and showing many people getting beheaded. We then discover from Nene that Pol killed Pot (he was pressured to accuse him if treason and sentence him to death by his advisors). Nene then confesses that she loved Pot and Pol replies that he killed Pot so he could be king and keep his promise to Nene. Furious she yells he has forgotten their real promise but it won't matter now because he forgot that he had done something that would wipe out the people in his kingdom. Nene then runs off and Pol then chases after her to the top. He then realizes he is on a rocket ship filled with bombs. Then the rocket crashes into the toy house, Yoshitune/Pol escapes from it and tries to find Nene. Then he steps on Pot's glasses and remembers that he did in fact kill Pot and broke his promise to bring happiness to his kingdom, and the dream ends. At the hospital, Nene's wakes up from her dream and says, "I want to meet you..."
8	"Threshold" (THRESHOLD)	Takaaki Ishiyama	Takaaki Ishiyama	Takaaki Ishiyama	Takaaki Ishiyama	August 25, 2017
9	"Idols Don't Go to the Bathroom!"; Transliteration: "Aidoru wa Toire ni Ikanai!" (Japanese: アイドルはトイレにいかない！)	Shigatsu Yoshikawa	Miyuki Kishimoto	Nagatsuki (Note: A pseudonym used by Shigatsu Yoshikawa.)	Nagatsuki	September 1, 2017
10	"Dream Dimension α" Transliteration: "Arufa Yume Jigen" (Japanese: α夢次元)	Koji Morimoto	Koji Morimoto	Koji Morimoto	Koji Morimoto	September 8, 2017
11	"The Thorn Cross Association"; Transliteration: "Togejūjikai" (Japanese: 棘十字会)	Yukio Takahashi	Atsuhiro Tomioka	Yukio Takahashi	Yukio Takahashi	September 15, 2017
12	"The Witch Wars"; Transliteration: "Majo taisen" (Japanese: 魔女大戦)	Kenzaburō Mori	Atsuhiro Tomioka	Kyōhei Suzuki	Kenzaburō Mori	September 22, 2017
13	"Eve's Sigh"; Transliteration: "Ibu no Toiki" (Japanese: イブの吐息)	Eitō Ifue (Note: A pun used as a pseudonym, written as 伊布重瑛翔; 伊布 is pronounced as Ifu ("if"); 重 read read as "juu", meaning "ten"; and 瑛翔, pronounced as "Eito", sounds like the English word "eight".)	Atsuhiro Tomioka	Akira Toba	Eitō Ifue	September 29, 2017
Haruto, Kanzaki and Lily entered the final domain, where Eve is. Kanzaki noticed that behind him, the door has been sealed by ivy. In the real world, the sky has become dark and white lilies have wrapped around the buildings, releasing the pollen onto the citizens. Lily remarked that dreams are spilling into the real world, due to the fact that Eve is now awake. Kanzaki then has Yuko relay to Haruto the truth behind his condition and why he cannot awaken from the dream world: he had been in an accident of an unknown origin, one in which Haruto himself cannot remember either, and has been in a coma for years. Lily agrees and explains that Haruto's timeless state is similar to Eve's. He suggests that Lily kill Eve, since She knows her best. This is ruled out by the revelation that Lily is Eve, rather is the Eve of Eden that existed before having eaten from God's Tree of Knowledge. The final door appears, where Eve awaits. Haruto asked if killing her will allow him to wake up, to which Lily said that he will only get his answer when the task is completed, and when Eve dies, so will she. When the door opened, they're in Haruto's room, with Eve sitting on a chair. Before the two Eves could fight each other, all of the previous 11 witches appear, stating that since Haruto saved them, it's their turn to help. Then they wanted Kanzaki and Haruto to serve some tea and snacks, while the others talk to Eve. Which at times it seemed like it would backfire, the witches succeeded in calming Eve's heart. She agrees to learn about the human world and reverses the crisis in the real world. Afterwards, Lily and Eve make up, and watch over the world together. Lily agreed and the two merged into one being: Eve. The door to God's Domain appears before everyone and Eve asks, with Lily's voice, to kill her. Haruto refuses, and Yurina suggested to only sully Eve's purity and turn her into a human girl. Haruto, who has by now realized that he will never come out of the coma, chose a different option instead: to pass through the door into God's Domain with Eve. In spite objections from the professor, Haruto says, "I finally know where I am now, so I can come back anytime. That's what I'd like to think anyway...and if you can, come visit me from time to time." The Witches and Kanzaki wished him well and watched as they disappeared into the new world. In the hospital, however, the heart monitor showed that Haruto has died. As time passed after Haruto's death, Kanzaki stated that he has heard nothing from him. Then every time he goes into the dream world, he could no longer find Haruto anywhere. Yurina supposed that Haruto may have become Adam, which Kanzaki quickly shot down. The only one who knows the answer is Lily. The Anime ends in God's Domain, and Lily giggling and saying, "We meet again, Brother..." as she reaches for Haruto's hand.
