= Keiko Watanabe =

Japanese voice actress

- 渡部 恵子
- Born: 29 March 1987 (age 39); Saitama Prefecture, Japan
- Occupations: Voice actress; singer
- Years active: 2008–present
- Notable work: Momoko Suou in The Idolmaster Million Live! Minami Ōyaba in Urawa no Usagi-chan; Rea Katagiri in World's End Harem

Keiko Watanabe (渡部 恵子, Watanabe Keiko; born 29 March 1987) is a Japanese voice actress known for voicing Momoko Suou in The Idolmaster Million Live!, Minami Ōyaba in Urawa no Usagi-chan, Rea Katagiri in World's End Harem, and Erica in Chillin' in My 30s After Getting Fired from the Demon King's Army.

== Biography ==
Keiko Watanabe was born on 29 March 1987 in Saitama Prefecture. As a university student, she was educated at the Japan Narration Actor Institute and had to take an after-school part-time job to attend the school.

During the late-2000s and early 2010s, Watanabe voiced minor characters in True Tears, xxxHolic: Kei, Darker than Black: Gemini of the Meteor, and JoJo's Bizarre Adventure. In 2015, she voiced Minami Ōyaba in Urawa no Usagi-chan. In 2017, she voiced Midoriko in A Centaur's Life. In 2018, she voiced Narita Taishin, one of the three main characters of BNW no Chikai (an OVA as part of the Uma Musume Pretty Derby franchise), and Shirogane-sensei in Märchen Mädchen. She later voiced Maho Kogomori in Rifle Is Beautiful and Anna in The Faraway Paladin.

In 2022, she starred in World's End Harem as Rea Katagiri, reprised her role as Minami Ōyaba in Urawa no Usagi-chan's second season, Musasino!, and voiced Miku in Shine Post. In 2023, she voiced Erica in Chillin' in My 30s After Getting Fired from the Demon King's Army.

Watanabe voices Momoko Suou in The Idolmaster Million Live!, a spin-off of The Idolmaster franchise. She reprised the role in Million Live's 2023 anime adaptation. On 29 March 2022 (her 35th birthday), Watanabe released her first solo song, "Alive".

On 30 November 2019, Watanabe ceased affiliation with her talent agency Crazy Box and became a freelancer.

== Filmography ==
=== Television animation ===
2008

- True Tears, Mikiko
- xxxHolic: Kei, student

2009

- Darker than Black: Gemini of the Meteor, girl

2012

- JoJo's Bizarre Adventure, woman

2015

- Urawa no Usagi-chan, Minami Oyaba

2017

- A Centaur's Life, Midoriko

2018

- Märchen Mädchen, Shirogane-sensei

2019

- Rifle Is Beautiful, Maho Kogomori

2020

- Magia Record, Uwasa

2021

- The Faraway Paladin, Anna

2022

- Shine Post, Miku
- Musasino!, Minami Ōyaba
- World's End Harem, Rea Katagiri

2023

- Chillin' in My 30s After Getting Fired from the Demon King's Army, Erica
- The Idolmaster Million Live!, Momoko Suou

=== Video games ===
2011

- Waguruma, Dominion

2013

- The Idolmaster Million Live!, Momoko Suou

2021

- Umamusume: Pretty Derby. Narita Taishin

=== Other media ===
2018

- BNW no Chikai, Narita Taishin

== Discography ==
- "Alive" (2022)
