= Urawa no Usagi-chan =

Japanese anime television series

浦和の調ちゃん
- Genre: Slice of life, Comedy
- Anime television series

Urawa no Usagi-chan (season 1); Musasino! (season 2)
- Directed by: Mitsuyuki Ishibashi
- Written by: Yūichirō Hanamura (season 1); Hiroyasu Kubota (season 2)
- Music by: Kuniyuki Morohashi
- Studio: A-Real
- Licensed by: Crunchyroll
- Original network: TV Saitama (seasons 1 & 2), KBS Kyoto (season 1 only)
- Original run: April 10, 2015 – September 17, 2022
- Episodes: 24 + 2

Urawa no Usagi-chan (浦和の調ちゃん; lit. Usagi-chan of Urawa) is a Japanese anime television series aimed to promote Urawa in Saitama Prefecture, Japan. The series aired in Japan from April to June 2015. A second season titled Musasino! was scheduled to premiere in July 2017, but was delayed to July 2022.

== Plot ==
The series is set in Urawa Ward, Saitama City, Saitama Prefecture. It follows 8 junior high school students in their daily lives in the ward. Five of them belong to the "Railway Club", while 3 are members of the student council.

Musasino! follows the Railway Club as they try to save themselves from being disbanded. It also introduces characters from Urawa's neighboring Ōmiya Ward.

== Characters ==
The eight main characters represent the stations in Saitama Prefecture that bear "Urawa" on those names. All main voice cast are natives of Saitama Prefecture.

Usagi Takasago (高砂 調, Takasago Usagi)
Voiced by: Asami Seto
A freshman who joins the Railway Club. She has a cheerful personality.
Minami Oyaba (大谷場 南, Oyaba Minami)
Voiced by: Keiko Watanabe
Usagi's best friend from middle school and a member of the Railway Club.
Tokiwa Kamikizaki (上木崎 常盤, Kamikizaki Tokiwa)
Voiced by: Satomi Akesaka
Class 2-A representative and a member of the Railway Club. She gets teased by Minami much to her chagrin.
Saiko Numakage (沼影 彩湖, Numakage Saiko)
Voiced by: Rumi Okubo
The school's delusional student council president. She wears cat ears and bat wings and has unrealistic ambitions to take over the school, and eventually Saitama. She sees the Railway Club as a big obstacle.
Kojika Bessho (別所 子鹿, Bessho Kojika)
Voiced by: Miyu Kubota
The student council vice president. She is a ninja fanatic.
Sakura Tajima (田島 桜, Tajima Sakura)
Voiced by: Yō Taichi
A member of the Railway Club.
Midori Saido (道祖土 緑, Saido Midori)
Voiced by: Hisako Tōjō
President of the Railway Club.
Misono Mimuro (三室 美園, Mimuro Misono)
Voiced by: Nao Tamura
The president of the public morals committee. She has a poor sense of direction.

=== Introduced in Musasino! ===
Azuma Aragami (荒神 東, Aragami Azuma)
Voiced by: Tomoyo Kurosawa
Nishiki Sakuragi (桜木 錦, Sakuragi Nishiki)
Voiced by: Sayaka Senbongi
Saiko Junō (寿能 栽子, Junō Saiko)
Voiced by: Miyu Tomita
Sakae Seiganji (清河寺 栄, Seiganji Sakae)
Voiced by: Saima Nakano
Shion Ichinomiya (一ノ宮 四恩, Ichinomiya Shion)
Voiced by: Chinatsu Hirose

== Media ==
=== Anime ===
An anime television series produced by A-Real and directed by Mitsuyuki Ishibashi aired from April 10 to June 26, 2015, on TV Saitama. The anime series also aired on KBS Kyoto starting April 13, 2015. Crunchyroll started to stream the anime on April 9, 2015. The ending theme is Urawa ga Tomaranai (URAWAがとまらない, Urawa Doesn't Stop) by Everyone Interested From Urawa Third High School (Asami Seto, Satomi Akesaka, Rumi Ōkubo, Miyu Kubota, Yō Taichi, Hisako Tōjō, Keiko Watanabe, and Nao Tamura). A second season titled Musasino! (むさしの！) was set to premiere in July 2017, but suffered a lengthy delay eventually premiering July 2, 2022, with Crunchyroll once again streaming it. The second season's ending theme is Usagi-chan Taisō (うさぎちゃん体操, Usagi-chan Gymnastics).

==== Episode list ====
===== Urawa no Usagi-chan (season 1, 2015) =====
No. overall	No. in season	Title	Original release date
1	1	"May Today be Another Good Day" "Kyō mo Ī Hi de Arimasu yō ni" (今日もいい日でありますように)	April 10, 2015
2	2	"Let's Go to Club!" "Bukatsu e Ikō!" (部活へ行こう!)	April 17, 2015
3	3	"Today, Around the Time the Wind Speaks" "Kaze, Katarikakeru Kyō Kono Goro" (風、語りかける今日この頃)	April 24, 2015
4	4	"Urawa's Reckless Angel, Saiko Numakage Appears!" "Urawa no Bōsō Tenshi Numakage Saiko Tōjō!" (浦和の暴走天使沼影 彩湖登場！)	May 1, 2015
5	5	"Life is A Cycle of Indecision" "Jinsei wa Mayoi no Renzoku de Aru" (人生は迷いの連続である)	May 8, 2015
6	6	"Ninja Girl Identity" "Ninja Gāru Aidentiti" (ニンジャガール・アイデンティティ)	May 15, 2015
7	7	"The Time for Formal Marriage Interviews Comes Suddenly" "Omiai no Jiki wa Totsuzen ni" (お見合いの時期は突然に)	May 22, 2015
8	8	"Battle! Student Council Vs. Railways Club: Part One" "Shōtotu!! Sētokai VS Tetsudōbu Sono Ichi" (衝突!! 生徒会 VS 鉄道部 その壱)	May 29, 2015
9	9	"Battle! Quiz Saitamania" "Kessen! Kuizu Saitamania" (決戦! クイズサイタマニア)	June 5, 2015
10	10	"Let's Use Our Lockers Carefully" "Rokkā wa Daiji ni Tsukaimashō" (ロッカーは大事に使いましょう)	June 12, 2015
11	11	"If I Retort, I Lose!" "Tsukkondara, Soko de Make!" (突っ込んだら、そこで負け!)	June 19, 2015
12	12	"May Tomorrow be Another Good Day" "Ashita mo Ī Hi ni Narimasu yō ni" (明日もいい日になりますように)	June 26, 2015
Bonus	—	"Summer Days, Clubrooms, Friends" "Natsu no Hi to, Bushitsu to, Tomodachi to" (明夏の日と, 部室と, 友達と)	October 26, 2015

===== Musasino! (season 2, 2022) =====
No. overall	No. in season	Title	Original release date
13	1	"Swimming in the Sea" "Kaisuiyoku" (海水浴)	July 2, 2022
14	2	"Termination Kerfuffle" "Haibu Sōdō" (廃部騒動)	July 9, 2022
15	3	"Praying for Victory" "Shukushō Kigan" (祝勝祈願)	July 16, 2022
16	4	"Memories of Ōmiya" "Ōmiya Kaiko-hen" (大宮回顧編)	July 23, 2022
17	5	"A Pep Rally" "Sōkōkai" (壮行会)	July 30, 2022
18	6	"Side Story in Space" "Bangai Uchū-hen" (番外宇宙編)	August 6, 2022
19	7	"The Championship's Decisive Match" "Kōshien Kessen" (甲子園決戦)	August 13, 2022
20	8	"The Championship's Decisive Match 2" "Kōshien Kessen 2" (甲子園決戦2)	August 20, 2022
21	9	"The Championship's Decisive Match 3" "Kōshien Kessen 3" (甲子園決戦3)	August 27, 2022
22	10	"The Championship's Decisive Match 4" "Kōshien Kessen 4" (甲子園決戦4)	September 3, 2022
23	11	"The Championship's Decisive Match 5" "Kōshien Kessen 5" (甲子園決戦5)	September 10, 2022
24	12	"The Ending" "Endingu" (エンディング)	September 17, 2022
Bonus	—	"A Bonus" "Bōnasu" (ボーナス)	August 18, 2025
