= Nao Tamura =

Japanese voice actress

- 田村 奈央
- Born: October 10; Saitama Prefecture, Japan
- Occupation: Voice actress
- Years active: 2011-present
- Agent: Haikyō
- Height: 1.53 m (5 ft 0 in)

Nao Tamura (田村 奈央, Tamura Nao; born October 10) is a Japanese voice actress from Saitama Prefecture, Japan. She was originally represented by the Early Wing agency, but is currently affiliated with Haikyō. She is best known for her roles as Emiru Aisaki / Cure Macherie in Hugtto! PreCure.

== Voice roles ==
=== Anime ===
2012

- From the New World

2013

- Aiura, Ayuko Uehara
- Little Busters!, child
- Log Horizon, Minori, Mischa

2014

- Fairy Tail, Cosmos
- Nandaka Velonica, Moe
- Space Dandy, child
- Log Horizon 2, Minori
- World Trigger, Chika Amatori

2015

- Urawa no Usagi-chan, Misono Mimuro

2016

- Case Closed, Announcement
- Digimon Universe: Appli Monsters, Musimon
- Heybot!, Nejiru Nejiiru

2017

- 18if, Kayo Sugisaki

2018

- Hugtto! PreCure, Emiru Aisaki / Cure Macherie

2021

- World Trigger 2nd Season, Chika Amatori
- Log Horizon: Destruction of the Round Table, Minori
- World Trigger 3rd Season, Chika Amatori

2022

- Musasino! as Misono Mimuro

2024

- Tsukimichi: Moonlit Fantasy 2nd Season, Chiya Hazuki

2025

- Bullet/Bullet, Lunch

=== Film ===
- Hugtto! PreCure Futari wa Pretty Cure: All Stars Memories, Emiru Aisaki / Cure Macherie
- Precure Miracle Universe, Emiru Aisaki / Cure Macherie
- Precure Miracle Leap: Minna na Fushigi 1 Nichi, Emiru Aisaki / Cure Macherie

=== Video games ===
2011

- Disgaea 4: A Promise Unforgotten, Mothman

2012

- Girl Friend Beta, Rui Takasaki

2013

- Aiura: Shinkei Suijaku de Shōbu da!, Ayuko Uehara
- Arcana Famiglia Collezione, Spartaco
- The Idolmaster: Million Live, Hinata Kinoshita

2014

- Chain Chronicle, Minori
- Genkai Totsuki Moero Chronicle, Matango, Chimaera
- Shanago Collection, Vezel
- Uchi no Hime-sama ga Ichiban Kawaii, Pikari Golgotto

2015

- Chaos Dragon: Konton Sensō, Kuihua
- Diss World, Yale
- Dogma Tsurugi: overture, Riruka
- Kisei no Rebellion, Jean D'Arc; Arthur
- Mezamashi Festival ~Yumekui to Mezamashi-ya~
- Langrisser Reincarnation -Tensei-, Tsubame Deura
- World Trigger: Borderless Mission, Chika Amatori

2016

- Mahōtsukai to Kuroneko no Wiz, Eliana Gross
- World Trigger: Smash Borders, Chika Amatori

=== Dubbing ===
- Younger (Caitlin Miller (Tessa Albertson))
