= Natsumi Hioka =

Japanese voice actress (born 1991)

- 日岡 なつみ
- Born: July 15, 1991 (age 35); Sapporo, Hokkaido, Japan
- Occupation: Voice actress
- Years active: 2012–present
- Agent: Production Baobab

Natsumi Hioka (日岡 なつみ, Hioka Natsumi; born July 15, 1991) is a Japanese voice actress born in Sapporo, Hokkaido. She is affiliated with Production Baobab.

== Biography ==
Hioka was born in Sapporo on July 15, 1991. She wanted to become a voice actor after watching late-night anime during high school, such as The Melancholy of Haruhi Suzumiya, Macross Frontier and Eden of the East, and learning about voice-over work. After convincing her parents, she moved to Tokyo to study at a vocational school.

== Works ==
=== Anime ===
2012

- The Ambition of Oda Nobuna – Ikeda Tsuneoki

2014

- Doraemon – Girl B
- Witch Craft Works – Kotetsu Katsura

2015

- Valkyrie Drive: Mermaid

2016

- Dimension W – Mana Ayukawa
- Lostorage incited WIXOSS – Rio Oshiba
- Kuma Miko: Girl Meets Bear – Machi Amayadori
- Sweetness and Lightning – Classmate

2017

- Armed Girl's Machiavellism – Tsukuyo Inaba
- Shadow of Laffandor – Tresta
- Is It Wrong to Try to Pick Up Girls in a Dungeon?: Sword Oratoria
- Magical Circle Guru Guru (2017) – Mogul
- Hinako Note – Schoolgirl

2018

- Mitsuboshi Colors – Kotoha
- Goblin Slayer – Inspector

2019

- Afterlost – Sumire
- Re:Stage! Dream Days♪ – Amaha Shiratori
- High School Prodigies Have It Easy Even In Another World – Shinobu Sarutobi
- Revisions – Daisuke Dojima (child)

2020

- Love Live! Nijigasaki High School Idol Club – Himeno Ayanokouji
- A Certain Scientific Railgun T

2021

- Suppose a Kid from the Last Dungeon Boonies Moved to a Starter Town – Alka
- Bottom-tier Character Tomozaki – Mika Akiyama
- Super Cub – Shii Eniwa
- Osamake – Akane Shida
- The Vampire Dies in No Time – Hinaichi

2022

- Slow Loop – Koharu Minagi
- Delicious Party Pretty Cure – Pam-Pam

2023

- Onimai: I'm Now Your Sister! – Miyo Murosaki
- Farming Life in Another World – Lastismun

=== Games ===
2014

- My Princess is The Cutest
- LAST SUMMONER

2015

- Milihime Taisen

2016

- Quiz RPG: The World of Mystic Wiz
- PuyoPuyo!!Quest – Yana, Sanira

2017

- White Cat Project – Shizu
- Monster Musume☆Harem

2018

- Alice Gear Aegis – Mai Nikotama
- Azur Lane – Hamakaze and Tanikaze
- Onsen Musume – Ayase Noboribetsu

2019

- Dragalia Lost – Yue

2020

- Vivid Army – Luca
- Disney: Twisted-Wonderland – Azul Ashengrotto (childhood)

2023
- Cookie Run: Kingdom - Fettucine Cookie (Japanese Voice)
