= Aiura =

Japanese yonkoma manga series

- Cover of the first manga volume featuring the main characters (from left to right), Kanaka Amaya, Saki Iwasawa and Ayuko Uehara.

あいうら
- Genre: Comedy, slice of life
- Manga
- Written by: Chama
- Published by: Kadokawa Shoten
- Magazine: Niconico Seiga; 4-Koma Nano Ace; Shōnen Ace
- Original run: 2 March 2011 – 23 April 2014
- Volumes: 7
- Anime television series
- Directed by: Ryōsuke Nakamura
- Written by: Ryōsuke Nakamura
- Music by: Shūsei Murai
- Studio: Liden Films
- Original network: TV Tokyo, AT-X
- Original run: 10 April 2013 – 26 June 2013
- Episodes: 12

Aiura (あいうら) (Note: The title refers to the initials of the three main character's surnames, akin to "A.I.U. Squad".) is a Japanese yonkoma shōnen manga series by Chama. It was first published on Niconico Seiga and later in Kadokawa Shoten's 4-Koma Nano Ace magazine. The manga ran between March 2011 and April 2014. An anime television series adaptation aired between April and June 2013.

== Plot ==
The story centers around Amaya, Iwasawa, and Uehara—three "annoying, spirited high school girls with zero motivation"—and their classmates. Their daily life is "what happens when there is nothing happening."

== Characters ==
Kanaka Amaya (天谷 奏香, Amaya Kanaka)
Voiced by: Yui Nakajima
Kanaka is the moodmaker. She is always looking to tease anyone within running distance, especially Saki and Ayuko. She has a habit of giving nicknames.
Saki Iwasawa (岩沢 彩生, Iwasawa Saki)
Voiced by: Yuko Iida
Saki is the tsukkomi to Kanaka's boke act. She is very tall and is very good at sports and games, but is otherwise unmotivated.
Ayuko Uehara (上原 歩子, Uehara Ayuko)
Voiced by: Nao Tamura
Ayuko is the middleman. The frequent butt of Kanaka's jokes and antics, she is constantly teased by Kanaka for being short. Her nickname has evolved from Ayukong (アユコング, Ayukongu) to Yukon (ゆっこん, Yukkon).
Mei Yanase (簗瀬 芽依, Yanase Mei)
Voiced by: Ayane Sakura
Yanase is the class representative. She is very serious about everything. She is very competitive with her friend Manaka. Her nickname is Yananchou (やなんちょ, Yanancho).
Nao Manaka (真中 南緒, Manaka Nao)
Nao is Yanase's friend, who always beats her in tests by a few points. She enjoys Kanaka's teasing of Yanase. Her nickname is Manax (マナックス, Manakkusu).
Souta Amaya (天谷 颯太, Amaya Sōta)
Voiced by: Yumiri Hanamori
Souta is Kanaka's younger brother. Kanaka and her friends usually hang out at his room since Kanaka's room is uninhabitable.
Sumiko Yamashita (山下 寿美子, Yamashita Sumiko)
Voiced by: Yumi Uchiyama
Yamashita is the laid back homeroom teacher of Kanaka's class. She is often late for work and wears odd shirts.
Shūsaku Matsuno (松野 修作, Matsuno Shūsaku)
Voiced by: Tomokazu Sugita
Matsuno is a fired up math teacher. He catches tardy students at the gate and challenges them to a game of rock-paper-scissors, where he often throws a game.
Misuzu Wakatsuki (若月 美鈴, Wakatsuki Misuzu)
Voiced by: Yukari Tamura
Misuzu is an English teacher who is constantly mistaken for a schoolgirl. She is the homeroom teacher of class 1.
Izumi Kashio (柏尾 泉水, Kashio Izumi)
Izumi is Saki's rival and boke from class 1. She works part time at a convenience store with Saki.
Arisa Kuroda (黒田 ありさ, Kuroda Arisa)
Arisa is Izumi's friend and classmate. She is good in sports and games despite being very small.
Umi Yoshino (吉野 羽美, Yoshino Umi)
Umi is the tsukkomi in class 1. She constantly worries about her weight.
Hiroko Uehara (上原 裕子, Uehara Hiroko)
Hiroko is Ayuko's older sister. She works as a manga artist and has a deep sister complex.

== Media ==
=== Manga ===
Aiura started as a 4-panel manga series, written and drawn by Chama. It was originally published online on Niconico Seiga, starting from 2 March 2011, and later in Kadokawa Shoten's 4-Koma Nano Ace magazine, starting from the 4th issue, published on 9 August 2011. Following the end of Nano Ace's publication, the series resumed serialization in Shōnen Ace magazine from its November 2013 issue. The manga series ended its run on 23 April 2014, and has been collected in seven compiled volumes between 3 February 2012, and 23 August 2014.

=== Anime ===
The anime television series adaptation was produced by Liden Films, Pony Canyon, and Tohokushinsha Film Corporation. It was directed and written by Ryōsuke Nakamura, with character designs by Mieko Hosoi, and music by Shūsei Murai. The anime is formatted as a series of shorts, with each episode being only a few minutes in length. The series aired on TV Tokyo between 10 April to 26 June 2013, and was streamed by Niconico and with English subtitles by Crunchyroll. The series was released in its entirety on Blu-ray Disc on 7 August 2013. The opening and ending themes are "Kani Do-Luck!" (カニ☆Do-Luck！) and "Ichigo Ichie" (いちごいちえ), both by Aiu Rabu (Yui Nakajima, Yuko Iida, and Nao Tamura).

==== Episode list ====
No.	Title (Note: All English titles are taken from Crunchyroll.)	Original release date
1	"The Day Before" "Zenjitsu" (Japanese: 前日)	10 April 2013
Ayuko Uehara spends her last day of spring break by going around town for a bit. She soon encounters two girls at a taiyaki bar, Saki Iwasawa and Kanaka Amaya. Kanaka excitedly shows some dancing theatrics with her taiyaki to Saki, before she accidentally bumps into Ayuko, subsequently knocking her ice cream over. Kanaka apologizes by offering Saki's spicy taiyaki and they both run off. As Ayuko bites into Saki's taiyaki, she overhears that they are starting high school the following day and remarks that she is as well. That night, Ayuko ponders that her school uniform is a bit to large for her, but that she'll probably grow into it.
2	"First Day of School" "Hatsutōkō" (Japanese: 初登校)	17 April 2013
On the first day of high school, Ayuko has trouble reaching her shoe locker. She is approached by Saki and Kanaka who remember her from the taiyaki bar, although Ayuko initially only remembers Saki. Noticing her plight, Kanaka gets down on her knees and offers to be a step-stool for Ayuko. Ignoring Kanaka's behavior, Saki, who being tall enough, reaches the locker and helps Ayuko and also offers to switch lockers with her as a way to solve the potentially persistent problem. Afterwards the three girls introduce themselves to each other as they walk to class and then chat about nicknames after finding their seats.
3	"Home Room" "Hōmurūmu" (Japanese: ホームルーム)	24 April 2013
As homeroom begins, Ms. Sumiko Yamashita gives her class a surprise pop quiz which contains the question, "What is your teacher's name?" Mei Yanase, being the only one to answer correctly, is made the class representative, while Kanaka is made the MVP for her answer "Hikaru Jinguji" (神宮司 ヒカル, Jingūji Hikaru), which Sumiko feels suits her better as a name. Afterwards, at lunch, the girls once again discuss nicknames, with Kanaka settling on calling Ayuko by the nickname: "Yukon". After school, Ayuko tries to get Ms. Yamashita's attention by calling her "Jinguji-sensei", but switches to "Yamashita-sensei" when she doesn't get a response.
4	"Sensei" "Sensei" (Japanese: 先生)	1 May 2013
Kanaka shows up at Saki's house to pick her up for school and begins playing with the doorbell, angering Saki. Kanaka decides to race Saki to school, but takes a wrong turn and ends up at her brother's junior high school. When she arrives at Iroha High School, Saki is already at the gate. At the same time, Mr. Shūsaku Matsuno mistakes Ms. Misuzu Wakatsuki for a student since she is wearing a student's uniform. She tries to justify the uniform and Mr. Matsuno compromises by making her wear a teacher's lab coat over the uniform. Mr. Matsuno is then approached by the tardy Ms. Yamashita who teases their school's weird teachers. As Mr. Matsuno demands an explanation for her tardiness, Ms. Yamashita asks him about his hair.
5	"Incident" "Jiken" (Japanese: 事件)	8 May 2013
Kanaka calls Saki on a morning and over the phone it sounds like she is being attacked. As Saki leaves for school, she finds Kanaka on the ground seemingly dead and steps over her. On their way, Kanaka remarks the Saki is the type of person who would ignore a "dead" friend, but Saki says that if it were Ayuko, she would do everything she can to bring her back to life. While at school, they bring Ayuko into the pointless discussion and Kanaka explains how she was "attacked" by a gladiator-type man but somehow managed to overpower him and afterwards Ayuko showed up and "stabbed" her. Ayuko says that she stabbed Kanaka out of irritation, before apologizing for "killing" Kanaka.
6	"Younger Brother" "Otōto" (Japanese: 弟)	15 May 2013
Kanaka continues to pretend she's dead in front of Saki's house, but this time, Saki ties her up. As Testing Week begins at Iroha High School, the students are let out early and Kanaka invites Saki and Ayuko over to her house to "study". Because Kanaka's room is not particularly welcoming to guests, the girls spend their time in her brother Souta's room, much to his mild irritation. As Souta is introduced to Ayuko, he asks her if Kanaka is giving her any trouble to which she responds that she is "a lot of fun" after a long pause. Souta eventually settles down to study for his own tests, while the girls continue relaxing, with Kanaka claiming they're just "warming up".
7	"The Amaya Household" "Amaya-ke" (Japanese: 天谷家)	22 May 2013
Souta tries to study while Kanaka and Ayuko continue playing Jenga. Kanaka invites Souta to take a turn in the game, and while he tries to move a brick, the tower crumbles. Being the loser, Souta is pressured by Kanaka and Ayuko to buy snacks and drinks. He even discovers that Saki isn't really asleep since she tells him what drink she would like. Later, Souta returns with the snacks and drinks and he and Saki play a PSP game, with the latter remarking that if she scores badly in her tests it'll be Souta's fault. The next day, the girls once again show up in Souta's room. Irritated, he goes to clean Kanaka's room so she can entertain guests there, to Kanaka's appreciation.
8	"Club Activities" "Bukatsu" (Japanese: 部活)	29 May 2013
Kanaka tries and fails to get Saki to join any school club with her, since she aspires to be called the "Captain" of a club. Ayuko comes along and agrees to try out for clubs with Kanaka. At lunch, Kanaka tells the girls about her failure to find a suitable club. Ayuko and Saki try to narrow down what type of club Kanaka would be best suited for but Kanaka reveals to them that she has no particular talent. While Kanaka sulks, Saki and Ayuko call her "Captain" to lift her spirits. Kanaka then decides to aim to become the student council president, although Saki teases that the government may not allow that.
9	"Dreams" "Yume" (Japanese: 夢)	5 June 2013
Kanaka tells Saki and Ayuko about a dream she had where they were at the beach smashing watermelons, but Saki became sad because she didn't get to smash any. Ayuko follows by explaining that in her dream, Kanaka was doing a magic trick with her hair, but when Ayuko pulled her left ponytail it resulted in an atomic explosion. Saki follows by telling them that her life dream is to marry into wealth. Saki and Ayuko are put into a state of disbelief when Kanaka reveals that she dreams of being an idol due to the low expectations of her mother and former junior high school teacher. Afterwards Kanaka asks Ms. Wakatsuki how to marry into wealth, which upsets her.
10	"Problem" "Mondai" (Japanese: 問題)	12 June 2013
Ms. Wakatsuki continues to wear the student's uniform, but misunderstands that Mr. Matsuno wants her to only wear the lab coat causing her to label him a pervert much to his shock. Later on, Kanaka goes around and asks Ayuko, Ms. Yamashita and Saki questions while covering their eyes, although Ms. Yamashita fails to recognize her, while Saki elbows Kanaka in the stomach. Afterwards, Kanaka asks Mei followed by Saki and Ayuko what high school girls actually do to which Mei responds that they study, to Kanaka's disbelief. Ayuko suggests that they probably talk about love, although Saki and Kanaka twist her words making it seem that Ayuko has romantic feelings for them.
11	"Rain" "Ame" (Japanese: 雨)	19 June 2013
On a rainy morning, Saki lazily decides to skip school and become a NEET, but grudgingly gets out of bed when Kanaka postulates that a NEET is beneath herself. Saki teases Kanaka's rain boots, although they keep her dry while Saki is forced to remove her own soaked socks. When Kanaka takes a picture of Saki's bare legs, Saki breaks her phone. Afterwards, Ms. Yamashita contemplates the pros and cons of the commute to school before declaring the semester over without teaching her students a single thing. Later Kanaka laments that the rain should wash away all of her non-existent problems. Summer vacation begins the next day and Kanaka continues to play with Saki's doorbell much to her irritation.
12	"See You Tomorrow" "Mata Ashita" (Japanese: また明日)	26 June 2013
Summer vacation begins and Ayuko receives a text asking to meet up with Kanaka and Saki. The girls then spend the day doing some of the same things Ayuko had done by herself at the end of spring break. Afterwards the girls spend the rest of the day at the ocean, enjoying the sunset together and promising to meet up the next day. While toweling her hair at the end of the day, Ayuko looks at the starry sky.
