= Witchcraft Works =

Japanese manga series

- First tankōbon volume cover, featuring Honoka Takamiya in Ayaka Kagari's arms

ウィッチクラフトワークス (Witchikurafuto Wākusu)
- Genre: Romantic comedy; Supernatural
- Manga
- Written by: Ryū Mizunagi
- Published by: Kodansha
- English publisher: NA: Vertical
- Imprint: Good! Afternoon KC
- Magazine: Good! Afternoon
- Original run: March 5, 2010 – February 7, 2022
- Volumes: 17
- Anime television series
- Directed by: Tsutomu Mizushima
- Produced by: Osamu Hosokawa; Yōhei Hayashi; Masuhiro Kinoshita; Yōhei Kisara; Miyuki Yamada; Junichirō Tsuchiya
- Written by: Tsutomu Mizushima
- Music by: Technoboys Pulcraft Green-Fund
- Studio: J.C.Staff
- Licensed by: Crunchyroll
- Original network: Tokyo MX, TVA, AT-X, BS11, ABC
- Original run: January 5, 2014 – March 23, 2014
- Episodes: 12
- Original video animation
- Directed by: Tsutomu Mizushima
- Produced by: Yūsuke Kido; Kenji Sumiya
- Written by: Reiko Yoshida
- Music by: Technoboys Pulcraft Green-Fund
- Studio: J.C.Staff
- Licensed by: Crunchyroll
- Released: January 7, 2015
- Runtime: 24 minutes
- Manga

Witchcraft Works Extra
- Written by: Ryū Mizunagi
- Published by: Kodansha
- Imprint: Good! Afternoon KC
- Magazine: Good! Afternoon
- Original run: March 7, 2022 – present
- Volumes: 5
- icon

Witchcraft Works (Japanese: ウィッチクラフトワークス, Hepburn: Witchikurafuto Wākusu) is a Japanese manga series written and illustrated by Ryū Mizunagi. It was serialized in Kodansha's seinen manga magazine Good! Afternoon from March 2010 to February 2022, with its chapters collected into seventeen tankōbon volumes. An anime television series adaptation by J.C.Staff aired from January to March 2014.

== Plot ==
Honoka Takamiya is a high school student living a normal life, which is frequently disrupted by his unavoidable association with Ayaka Kagari, the school's renowned idol. Their shared classroom seating and cleaning responsibilities often lead to minor interactions, for which Honoka faces retribution from her dedicated fan club. This pattern is broken when a supernatural event occurs: a school building is launched through the air toward Honoka. His rescue is effected by a Witch, a magical figure who repels the attack. This Witch subsequently identifies herself as Ayaka, explaining that her prior distant demeanor was a deliberate disguise for her true role as his perpetual guardian against hidden threats.

== Characters ==
=== Main characters ===
Honoka Takamiya (多華宮 仄, Takamiya Honoka)
Voiced by: Yūsuke Kobayashi
Honoka is a high school student who initially questions the frequent coincidences in his life. He is targeted by a group known as the Tower Witches until his classmate, Ayaka, reveals herself as a Workshop Witch tasked with his protection. A mysterious, powerful entity called Evermillion, or the White Princess, resides within Honoka, making him a target. He becomes Ayaka's apprentice to aid her, though she forbids him from using the entity's power directly due to a dangerous "payment" it demands. Their fates are intrinsically linked; Ayaka can channel this power, but any physical injury Honoka sustains is transferred to her. This bond stems from a past incident where Honoka saved Ayaka's life by making a deal with the White Princess, an act that connected their lives and resulted in their memories being erased for protection.
Ayaka Kagari (火々里 綾火, Kagari Ayaka)
Voiced by: Asami Seto
Ayaka is a statuesque and intellectually gifted student, recognized as the official "Princess" of the school. Publicly stoic and socially detached, she is secretly a "Fire Witch" (炎の魔女) capable of manipulating flames. A powerful spell connects her to her classmate, Honoka; this bond grants her near-invulnerability and immense power so long as he is near, though any physical damage he sustains is instantly transferred to her. Her mission is to protect Honoka from hostile forces, a duty she extends to shielding him from any form of harassment. She was originally the host for the entity Evermillion until Honoka intervened, transferring the being into himself to save her life, an act that forged their profound connection and erased their memories of the event.

=== Workshop Witches ===
Kasumi Takamiya (多華宮 霞, Takamiya Kasumi)
Voiced by: Ai Kayano
Kasumi is Honoka's younger sister and a Workshop Witch with a profound brother complex, frequently seeking his physical affection despite their ages. She possesses a teddy bear familiar that transforms into a powerful combat mech named "Maka-ron" (摩訶ロン). Tasked with protecting Honoka, she is a capable hand-to-hand fighter but requires a bear-shaped medium gifted by her brother to access her full magical potential. She is intensely jealous of Ayaka's relationship with Honoka and often clashes with her, particularly upon finding them in compromising situations.
Kazane Kagari (火々里 かざね, Kagari Kazane)
Voiced by: Sayaka Ohara
Kazane is the long-lived chairwoman of Tōgetsu High School and head of the city's Workshop Witches, a powerful figure known by fearsome monikers such as "Bad End". She is temperamental and prefers resolving conflicts through overwhelming force. Her magic passively safeguards civilians from collateral damage during supernatural conflicts. A longtime associate of Honoka's family, she saved his mother's life years ago, resulting in Honoka inheriting her magical bloodline and becoming her student. To protect Honoka and her adopted daughter, Ayaka, she later captured the witch Kayou Kagari and took control of the Kagari family.
Kyōichirō Mikage (深影 恭一郎, Mikage Kyōichirō)
Voiced by: Kazuyuki Okitsu
A chemistry teacher at Honoka's high school who helps manage the memories of the non-witch population whenever parts of the city get destroyed by magic. He also recruits witches throughout the city for the Workshop. Mikage has his own plans for Honoka and his "white stuff", but his true motives are unknown.
Touko Hio (氷尾 凍子, Hio Tōko)
Voiced by: Kana Asumi
Touko is a Workshop Witch specializing in ice-based magic, the scale of which increases proportionally to any threat she faces. A childhood friend of Ayaka, she was personally asked by Kazane to watch over her due to Ayaka's lack of social intelligence. To support her large family, Touko works numerous part-time jobs throughout the city, positions she also uses to gather intelligence for Ayaka. She previously served as the Student Council's Vice President and now holds the title of "Vice-Vice President".
Rinon Otometachibana (乙女橘 りのん, Otometachibana Rinon)
Voiced by: Noriko Shitaya
Rinon is a Workshop Witch and Kasumi's mentor, who also leads a gang of delinquents in hamster costumes. Known as the "Bear Killer" for reportedly strangling a tiger, she relies on magic to enhance her immense physical strength rather than casting visible spells. She publicly challenged Honoka for control of the student council but was ultimately defeated, a confrontation where Honoka refused to strike the final blow. It is implied she endured the same harsh training as Ayaka under Kazane.
Atori Kuramine (昏峰 あとり, Kuramine Atori)
Voiced by: Ikumi Hayama
A soft-spoken witch with cat-like ears who wields a large sword. Atori prefers to talk through a small, magical ventriloquist doll she keeps nearby at almost all times. Has a questionable understanding of first-aid.

=== Tower Witches ===
==== Ivory Quintet ====
Tanpopo Kuraishi (倉石 たんぽぽ, Kuraishi Tanpopo)
Voiced by: Shiori Izawa
Sakuya is a Tower Witch and a "Shikigami User" (式神使い, Shikigami Tsukai) who commands an army of paper rabbits that can be transformed into mechanized soldiers. She acts as the unofficial leader of the "Ivory Quintet", a group of witches who transfer to Tōgetsu High School with the mission to capture Honoka.
Kanna Utsugi (宇津木 環那, Utsugi Kanna)
Voiced by: Shiina Natsukawa
She is a member of Ivory Quintet; in spite of her natural mad-looking face, she actually has normal emotions. Her power is to summon and use demons by the book called "Black Vice" (ブラックヴァイス, Burakku Vaisu) that she carries on her back, though this power is rarely shown.
Rin Kazari (飾 鈴, Kazari Rin)
Voiced by: Momo Asakura
A soft-voiced member of Ivory Quintet, who wields a scythe. She has a power called "Bone Animator" (骨使い(ボーンアニメーター), Bon Animeta; lit. 'Bone User'), which can only be used to revive dead skeletons of any size and use them as her weapons.
Kotetsu Katsura (桂 虎鉄, Katsura Kotetsu)
Voiced by: Natsumi Hioka
A member of the Ivory Quintet and Tōgetsu High School's Kendo club. Her given name is based on a same-named Japanese sword that she wields.
Mei Menowa (目野輪 冥, Menowa Mei)
Voiced by: Yuko Iida
One of the Tower Witches that form the Ivory Quintet. She has the ability to pass through walls and create a defensive barrier. She wears a complete wolf pelt called "Coast Fenrir", a sort of baby wolf formed from the feather of a fallen angel that functions as both extra appendage and semi-sentient weapon.

==== Others ====
Evermillion (エヴァーミリオン, Evu~āmirion)
Voiced by: Mamiko Noto
Evermillion, also known as the White Princess (白姫, Shirohime), is an ancient and immensely powerful fire witch capable of harnessing the power of souls. Her form changes based on the soul of her current host. She was formerly subjugated by Kayou Kagari and bound within Ayaka to serve as a controllable vessel. Evermillion manipulated Honoka into a deal, intending to consume his soul, but was instead neutralized and purified by his innate power and pure heart, manifesting as a frilly white princess. This transformation intrigued her, leading her to sincerely aid Honoka and engage in playful teasing. The terms of their pact are the reason Ayaka can access the White Princess's power.
Chronoire Schwarz VI (クロノワールシュヴァルツ・シックス, Kuronowārushuvarutsu Shikkusu)
Voiced by: Rie Kugimiya
A powerful Tower Witch who specializes in crafting potions and often walks around with a well-dressed crocodile familiar named Sebastian. Has her own plans for Honoka's "white stuff". Chronoire is on relatively neutral terms with Kazane despite officially being her enemy; sometimes Kazane physically beats and tortures her for information, other times Kazane entrusts her as temporary chairman of the school while she is on other business. Chronoire also has earned the nickname "Dead End" for her ability to turn into a part-crocodile monster and literally eat other witches if she wants.
Medusa (メデューサ, Medyūsa)
Voiced by: Miyuki Sawashiro
A high-ranking Tower Witch who controls the KMM Gang and their associates in order to steal Honoka's "white stuff" for herself. Has the power to petrify her enemies into stone statues, but has been weakened after being trapped in a magic prison.
Weekend (ウィークエンド, Wīkuendo)
Voiced by: Aya Hirano
A Tower Witch whose main strength is meticulous planning and preparation as opposed to any overtly magic power. Though Weekend is not her real name, she uses it anyway for the notoriety it brings her. Weekend's specialty involves setting up explosives of both magic and non-magic varieties. Runs her own small faction to kidnap Honoka for his "white stuff" as well.
Komachi Takamiya (多華宮 小町, Takamiya Komachi)
Voiced by: Ayako Kawasumi
Honoka and Kasumi's mother. Rather a cheerful and supportive mother, she was easily broken emotionally. She fell in love with Kazane during her school years, and promised to marry her (instead, they arranged the marriage of their future children). She works as an office lady. She also has open arms, which was evident in the fact that she took the Ivory Quintet into her home.

== Media ==
=== Manga ===
Written and illustrated by Ryū Mizunagi, Witchcraft Works was serialized in Kodansha's seinen manga magazine Good! Afternoon from March 5, 2010, to February 7, 2022. Kodansha collected its chapters in seventeen tankōbon volumes, released from November 5, 2010, to March 7, 2022.

The manga is licensed in North America for English language publication by Vertical. The first volume was released on October 21, 2014.

Following the series' conclusion, an "extra" serialization spin-off started on Good! Afternoon on March 7, 2022. Five volumes have been released as of August 6, 2026.

==== Volumes ====
No.	Original release date	Original ISBN	English release date	English ISBN
1	November 5, 2010	978-4-06-310713-5	October 21, 2014	978-1-941220-00-9
2	July 7, 2011	978-4-06-310760-9	December 9, 2014	978-1-941220-01-6
3	March 7, 2012	978-4-06-387810-3	February 7, 2015	978-1-941220-17-7
4	November 7, 2012	978-4-06-387849-3	April 21, 2015	978-1-941220-18-4
5	May 5, 2013	978-4-06-387884-4	June 30, 2015	978-1-941220-19-1
6	November 7, 2013	978-4-06-387931-5	August 18, 2015	978-1-941220-20-7
7	July 7, 2014	978-4-06-387981-0	October 13, 2015	978-1-941220-52-8
8	January 7, 2015	978-4-06-388026-7	December 8, 2015	978-1-941220-96-2
9	November 6, 2015	978-4-06-388099-1	August 30, 2016	978-1-942993-15-5
10	November 7, 2016	978-4-06-388201-8	December 26, 2017	978-1-942993-92-6
11	August 7, 2017	978-4-06-388282-7	April 24, 2018	978-1-947194-15-1
12	June 7, 2018	978-4-06-511537-4	July 23, 2019	978-1-947194-67-0
13	December 7, 2018	978-4-06-513898-4	November 26, 2019	978-1-949980-00-4
14	November 7, 2019	978-4-06-517558-3	November 24, 2020	978-1-949980-20-2
15	October 7, 2020	978-4-06-520913-4	April 13, 2021	978-1-949980-77-6
16	July 7, 2021	978-4-06-524050-2	July 26, 2022	978-1-64729-005-4
17	March 7, 2022	978-4-06-527105-6	April 11, 2023	978-1-64729-209-6
Extra (1)	February 7, 2023	978-4-06-530575-1	—	—
Extra (2)	December 7, 2023	978-4-06-533914-5	—	—
Extra (3)	November 7, 2024	978-4-06-537470-2	—	—
Extra (4)	October 7, 2025	978-4-06-541122-3	—	—
Extra (5)	August 6, 2026	978-4-06-544494-8	—	—

=== Anime ===
An anime television series adaptation was announced in November 2012. It was animated by J.C.Staff and written and directed by Tsutomu Mizushima. The series' first episode was screened at Tokyo's Cinemart Shinjuku theater on December 29, 2013, streamed to 2000 people on December 30, 2013, by Bandai Channel and aired for twelve episodes between January 5 and March 23, 2014, on Tokyo MX. Additionally the anime was aired on TVA, AT-X, BS11, and ABC and was streamed with English subtitles by Crunchyroll. The series' music is composed by Technoboys Pulcraft Green-Fund. The opening theme song is "divine intervention" by Fhána and the ending is "Witch☆Activity" (ウィッチ☆アクティビティ) by KMM Gang consisting Izawa, Natsukawa, Asakura, Hioka, and Iida.

==== Episodes ====
No.	Title	Original release date
1	"Takamiya-kun and the Fire Witch" "Takamiya-kun to Honō no Majo" (多華宮君と炎の魔女)	January 5, 2014
Honoka Takamiya is going through his usual routine of a boring school life and getting beaten up by bullies for his perceived closeness to the school's idol, Ayaka Kagari. However, one day he finds himself under attack by an army of tin soldier rabbits. He is saved from the attack by a witch with powerful fire-based magic, who turns out to be Ayaka herself, and refers to Honoka as her "princess".
2	"Takamiya-kun and the Witches' Agenda" "Takamiya-kun to Majo-tachi no Omowaku" (多華宮君と魔女達の思惑)	January 12, 2014
Honoka opens a classroom door to find Ayaka torturing four of the evil witches who transferred to their school. The leader of the group, Tanpopo Kuraishi, claims that they want to get his "white stuff". Suddenly, the fifth transfer student witch kidnaps Honoka, but does not get far before Ayaka blows them all away with her fire magic. Shortly after the incident, Honoka goes on a date around town with Ayaka, explaining the conflict between the Tower and Workshop witches. Then she brings him back to school to meet the chairwoman, her mother, and the leader of the Workshop witches in the city: Kazane Kagari.
3	"Takamiya-kun and Chronoire's Trap" "Takamiya-kun to Kuronowāru no Wana" (多華宮君とクロノワールの罠)	January 19, 2014
After another quick encounter with Tanpopo's "KMM Gang", Ayaka begins training Honoka on how to use his own latent witch powers, including the ability to hide in plain sight and fly on a broomstick. After flying around the town, he uses his powers to intervene and save a little girl from bullies, until Honoka himself has to be rescued by Ayaka again. Later, as the two of them ride the school bus, they find themselves in the trap of a powerful Tower witch named Chronoire Schwarz VI. She subdues Ayaka by injuring Honoka and using his latent powers of transferring all his damage to her, then gives him a candy that she predicts he will swallow in the future. Ayaka manages to wake up in time and force Chronoire to retreat, but Honoka keeps the candy.
4	"Takamiya-kun and the Mean Little Sister" "Takamiya-kun to Ijiwaru na Imōto" (多華宮君といじわるな妹)	January 26, 2014
A powerful Tower witch named Medusa is shown slowly cracking open her supposedly unbreakable prison. Elsewhere, Honoka's sister, Kasumi Takamiya, starts getting jealous of her brother spending more time away from home with Ayaka. While the KMM Gang attempts another plan to kidnap Honoka by splitting him from Ayaka, Kasumi intervenes on her brother's behalf, using a giant teddy bear to fight the giant tin soldier rabbit that Tanpopo summons to fight her. However, the bear grows so large that its attacks destroy a significant portion of the town (while leaving the people unharmed). Afterwards, Ayaka returns having quickly beaten the Tower witches, promising to watch over Honoka 24/7.
5	"Takamiya-kun and the Witch of Stone Eyes and Stone Hands" "Takamiya-kun to Sekigansekishu no Majo" (多華宮君と石眼石手の魔女)	February 2, 2014
Ayaka comes home with Honoka to ask his mother if he can stay over at her house from now on. Despite her daughter's loud objections, Komachi Takamiya agrees, revealing that she actually had an agreement with Kazane in the past that, because they could not marry each other, their future children would be married to each other instead. Upon arriving at Ayaka's incredibly luxurious mansion, Ayaka and Honoka find themselves face-to-face with the escaped Medusa. Ayaka tries to fight her, but Medusa uses magic to turn her into stone. With no other options left, Honoka swallows the candy that Chronoire gave him before, drawing out the White Princess, Evermillion. Evermillion uses her power to beat back Medusa, which ends up destroying most of the mansion and a large part of the school as well, angering Kazane enough to call for a Tower witch-hunt. Evermillion then reveals that all Honoka had to do was kiss Ayaka with love to wake her up, which he does. Ayaka then uses her powers to defeat Medusa and the KMM Gang (again). Later, before Chronoire can launch her evil plan, Kazane captures and then tortures her for information.
6	"Takamiya-kun and the Test of Love" "Takamiya-kun to Ai no Shiren" (多華宮君と愛の試練)	February 9, 2014
When Ayaka and Honoka arrive at school, the science teacher separates Honoka from Ayaka, using Clarke's Third Law as an excuse. He warns Honoka that by using the candy, one of five seals has been broken, and if he reveals the information to anyone, Kazane might take drastic action. Later, Ayaka uses her semi-official "Princess" position at the school to unilaterally replace the student council President with Honoka. After school, Kasumi shoots Ayaka with a powerful tranquilizer gun and kidnaps Honoka to take him out of the city, where Kazane's power supposedly cannot reach, but Ayaka quickly recovers and uses a dragon to shoot down Kasumi and her giant teddy bear plane before they can escape.
7	"Takamiya-kun and Noblesse Oblige" "Takamiya-kun to Noburesu Oburīju" (多華宮君とノブレス・オブリージュ)	February 16, 2014
Ayaka has been secretly keeping Medusa and the KMM Gang in her room at Honoka's house after their last battle. Tanpopo tries to quietly kidnap Honoka but cannot seem to find the right moment. However, Mei and Kotetsu accidentally run into him while coming out of the bath and immediately capture him, provoking a standoff with Kazane as she returns from a shopping trip. Ayaka aligns herself with the Tower Witches to protect Honoka, and merges with Medusa to boost her power, but ends up losing anyway as Kazane beats Honoka unconscious before sending both him and Ayaka to a dungeon. Ayaka later borrows some of Honoka's power to break out, damaging another section of the school to Kazane's despair. Ayaka prepares to fight her mother, but Kazane refuses, demanding the two of them go home instead.
8	"Takamiya-kun and Kagari-san's Wound" "Takamiya-kun to Kagari-san no Kizu" (多華宮君と火々里さんの傷)	February 23, 2014
Honoka has a dream of Ayaka's past, where she was a socially-stunted little girl to the point that her mother asked two similarly young Workshop witches to watch over her. She often spent her after class time looking for a certain boy at nearby schools until she finally found Honoka. In the present, Honoka is forced to deal with a challenge to his authority as President of the student council. The previous President lied to infamous delinquent Rinon Otometachibana that Honoka physically abused her, and as revenge, Rinon set her entire hamster-themed gang to trash the school before challenging Honoka to a one-on-one duel. Ayaka tries to help Honoka fight her at first, but on the day of the duel she cheats to make it appear as though Honoka won. Later, it is revealed that Ayaka manipulated the deposed President from the start just to reaffirm Honoka's position at school.
9	"Takamiya-kun and the Witch of the End" "Takaimiya-kun to Owari no Majo" (多華宮君と終わりの魔女)	March 2, 2014
Ayaka decides to teach Honoka about offensive magic, trying to make him summon a familiar by throwing him off the roof of a tall building. In a panic, he ends up summoning a giant image of Ayaka in a sexy nurse outfit that catches the two of them before punching a nearby building. Meanwhile, Kazane discovers a giant magic bomb underneath the city, and meets with a Tower Witch named Weekend to negotiate, but Weekend simply detonates the bomb, destroying several buildings and exhausting all of Kazane's magic power as she tries to limit the damage. Ayaka and Honoka are escorted into a cell by other Workshop Witches for their safety, but a high-tech magic puppet created by Weekend finds them. Ayaka uses the puppet to blow up a section of the wall and break out, but Ayaka remarks that neither of them have their magic power.
10	"Takamiya-kun and the Weekend (Part 1)" "Takamiya-kun to Wīkuendo (Zen-pen)" (多華宮君とウィークエンド （前編）)	March 9, 2014
The Workshop Witches are in crisis mode as Ayaka and Honoka emerge to find themselves in a broken city. Without Kazane's powers, the Workshop Witches in the city are unable to use any magic and no outside help will arrive in time. To make matters worse, Weekend captures a group of Workshop Witches and straps magical bombs to them, demanding that they hand over Honoka in 30 minutes or she will detonate her hostages one by one. While Rinon and Atori try to defuse the situation, Ayaka takes Honoka down to the core of the city to renew the contract using Honoka's latent powers. At the very last second, Honoka completes the contract, allowing the Workshop Witches to rescue the hostages and capture Weekend. However, after being thrown in a magic-nullifying cell, Weekend reveals that she let herself be captured so she could destroy the Workshop from within, which she does with more hidden bombs. Honoka uses his new powers to revive the wounded witches, but Ayaka knocks him out before the strain kills him.
11	"Takamiya-kun and the Weekend (Part 2)" "Takamiya-kun to Wīkuendo (Chū-hen)" (多華宮君とウィークエンド （中編）)	March 16, 2014
As Ayaka lays Honoka to rest in what remains of his home, Honoka views several of Kazane's memories. Honoka then gets word from the science teacher Mikage that they are in an alternate reality created by the city due to the contract Honoka just made, and takes him down to a shelter where the residents of the city are stuck in suspended animation until they can be safely revived. Suddenly, one of Weekend's underlings attacks Honoka at the shelter. Meanwhile, Ayaka heads off to fight Weekend herself at a church. However, Weekend uses several bombs she planted around the church to drain Ayaka's power, then captures her using giant monster golems, revealing that she planted the bombs in the city months ago as part of her plan. Back at Honoka's house, Mikage ends up reviving Honoka while Atori is attending to him. Mikage then delivers a message that Weekend plans to destroy the shelter unless Honoka is delivered to her in 30 minutes. Honoka and Atori race to the scene of a large explosion to find a drained Ayaka, and Honoka gives her some more power to defeat Weekend before she can destroy the shelter. However, Weekend reveals that she already set off her bomb.
12	"Takamiya-kun and the Weekend (Part 3)" "Takamiya-kun to Wīkuendo (Kō-hen)" (多華宮君とウィークエンド （後編）)	March 23, 2014
As Tanpopo decides to carry Kasumi out from the wreckage, Weekend's bomb wipes out all the townspeople inside the shelter, including Mikage. Honoka desperately tries to save them, striking a bargain with Evermillion by sacrificing his life to save the town and everyone in it, but Ayaka decides to exchange her life for Honoka's at the last minute. All of the people and buildings in the city are restored as if nothing happened, including Weekend, who stabs Honoka with a knife. Weekend decides to have Honoka healed and acknowledges her defeat, shortly before running into Chronoire. In the restored church, Honoka, Atori and Mikage work on a way to bring Ayaka back to life, using some of Honoka's blood and a kiss. Miraculously, Ayaka regains consciousness. Meanwhile, Chronoire is shown impaling Weekend and most of her underlings on sharp poles, when Kazane shows up. Kazane then demands Chronoire hand Weekend over for questioning, but Chronoire responds that Weekend is her "dinner", and the two fight each other to settle the score. Later, an unconscious Honoka and Mikage visit Evermillion as she talks about the renewed contract that Honoka has formed with her, warning him about the consequences he will have to face if he tries a similar action in the future. As he wakes up, Ayaka greets him at the bedroom door. The two then walk to school when the reformed KMM Gang threatens them en route. Even without her magic restored, Ayaka simply grabs Tanpopo and Mei by their faces and squeezes them until the gang submits.
13 (OVA)	"Takamiya-kun and His Sister's Conspiracy" "Takamiya-kun to Imōto no Warudakumi" (多華宮君と妹の悪巧み)	January 7, 2015
After the events of the previous episode, Kasumi meets with a drunken Tanpopo in a nearby bar and proposes an alliance to defeat Ayaka for supposedly stealing Honoka from her. After collecting some Tower Witches who were defeated by Ayaka in the past, Kasumi and Tanpopo's new gang confront Ayaka in her room, only to be swiftly beaten by her strength alone. The next day, Kasumi watches an anime DVD with her friend Tanuma, but the more risque scenes from the show conflict with her ideas of what a romantic relationship with her brother would mean. Suddenly, Rinon appears and carries both Kasumi and Tanpopo to a site where a giant penguin is wreaking havoc on the town. Rinon tells Kasumi to fight the penguin with her own giant teddy bear, and soon Kasumi and Tanpopo find themselves in a tag-team match against the giant penguin and one of Weekend's followers, all using enlarged familiars. Finally, Kasumi ends the fight by growing her teddy bear so large its head reaches the stratosphere, then smashes the penguin. After finding that the giant penguin was somehow spawned from a penguin idol her brother carved, she hides the evidence in her teddy bear and heads home.

== Reception ==
The fourth volume of the manga series ranked #25 in the Oricon charts in November 2012 with a total of 27,389 copies sold in under a week. The fifth volume ranked #28 in the Oricon charts in May 2013 with a total of 31,678 copies sold in under a week. The sixth volume ranked #29 in the Oricon charts in November 2013 with a total of 27,573 copies sold in under a week.
