= Ru Thing =

Japanese voice actress

- ルゥティン
- Born: December 21, 1993 (age 32); People's Republic of China
- Occupation: Voice actress
- Years active: 2013–present
- Agent: I'm Enterprise

Ru Thing (ルゥティン, Rutin; born 21 December 1993) is a Chinese-Japanese voice actress affiliated with I'm Enterprise. She is best known for voicing Syuko Shiomi in The Idolmaster Cinderella Girls video game and Rishuri Maezono in Tokyo 7th Sisters.

== Biography and career ==
Ru Thing was born in the People's Republic of China on 21 December 1993 and was raised in Osaka Prefecture and educated at the Japan Narration Actor Institute.

Her voice acting career began in 2013, and she was cast as Rishuri Maezono in the Tokyo 7th Sisters rhythm game. In 2015, she was cast as Syuko Shiomi in The Idolmaster Cinderella Girls, and her character single, which features the song Ao no Ichibanhoshi, was released on 18 November 2015. It charted on the Oricon Singles Chart for 19 weeks and topped at #13 on 30 November. Syuko Shiomi also appeared in the series' first album to top the Oricon Albums Chart, Cute jewelries! 003, and in the second season of the Cinderella Girls anime adaptation.

In anime, she has had minor roles in Love Live! Sunshine!!, Oreshura, and The Morose Mononokean.

== Filmography ==
=== Anime ===
2013

- Oreshura, schoolgirl

2015

- The Idolmaster Cinderella Girls season 2, Syuko Shiomi

2016

- The Morose Mononokean, schoolgirl
- Love Live! Sunshine!!, schoolgirl

=== Video games ===
2019

- Arknights: Firewatch, Haze

2024

- Reverse: 1999: Anjo Nala

2025

- Persona 5: The Phantom X: Yaoling Li
