= Natsumi Haruse =

Japanese voice actress

- 春瀬 なつみ
- Born: June 17, 1994 (age 32); Takamatsu, Kagawa Prefecture, Japan
- Occupations: Actress; voice actress
- Years active: 2014-present
- Agent: Mausu Promotion
- Height: 146 cm (4 ft 9 in)

Natsumi Haruse (春瀬なつみ, Haruse Natsumi; born June 17, 1994) is a Japanese voice actress from Takamatsu, affiliated with Mausu Promotion. She is known for her roles as Kaoru Ryūzaki in The Idolmaster Cinderella Girls, Ibuki Tanga in Blue Archive and Inori Yuitsuka in Medalist.

== Biography ==
She initially aimed to be an actress, but worried about her low stature, she developed an interest for anime and decided to become a voice actress.

She was initially signed to Pro-Fit and was a member of the new voice actor unit "tamaco" (タマコ), in the TV program "Seiryuumon".

After leaving Pro Fit, she didn't take on any new voice actor role and only continued on her established roles, working freelance for around two and a half years. But on February 1, 2018, she joined Mausu Production and completely resumed her voice acting career. She has worked as a company employee. Even after joining Mausu, she kept balancing her company work with her voice acting career.

=== Background ===
Having grown up watching Disney Channel, one of her dreams was to work on a Disney Channel production. She fulfilled her dream by dubbing 101 Dalmatian Street, which started airing in Japan in July 2019.

Her hobby is watching figure skating. She can distinguish between figure skating jumps. Her interest began during the 2010 Winter Olympics, when she wondered why Mao Asada and Yuna Kim had such high scores. The following year, in 2011, she watched Adelina Sotnikova, Elizaveta Tuktamysheva, and Polina Shelepen compete in junior competitions (2010–11 ISU Junior Grand Prix, 2010–11 Grand Prix of Figure Skating Final, 2011 World Junior Figure Skating Championships) and became particularly fond of Russian figure skaters. Elena Radionova, who began to perform well as a novice around the same time, is her "lifelong favorite." Since then, she has supported a wide range of skaters, from novice to senior, mainly Russian skaters. Because of this, her favorite skaters are often in their early teens, and when she introduces them to others, they are sometimes a little put off by their youth. When her favorite skaters have participated in competitions in Japan, she has even gone to watch them in person with a cheering banner. When talking about figure skating, she can get too passionate, which can sometimes put others off. In 2025 she became the official "cheerleader" of the ice show Kassouya, produced by 2010 Olympic bronze medalist and 2010 World Figure Skating Champion Daisuke Takahashi. Her cheerleading role entailed promotion and live announcements at the venue during the Hiroshima shows. Haruse said about her involvement with the show: "It's an incredible honour for me. I'm a huge skating fan myself and often watch competitions and ice shows, but I never expected to be appointed cheerleader. After last year's "Kassouya" performances, I was scrolling through videos on my phone that audience members had posted on social media, and I thought to myself, "I should have gone to see it! What a shame! I'll definitely go next year." I never thought I would have such a future. I'm so happy."

She plays the main character, Inori Yuitsuka, in Medalist saying she's such an enthusiastic fan that she dreamed of playing the role of Inori from the beginning of the series. On the other hand, the author of the series, Tsurumaikada, was an enthusiastic fan of Haruse even before he became a manga artist, and this is the fruition of both their feelings.

Her other hobbies and skills include reading, watching movies, and listening to music. her dialect is Sanuki dialect.

== Filmography ==
=== Television animation ===
Year	Title	Role	Ref.
2015	The Idolmaster Cinderella Girls	Kaoru Ryūzaki	
2015	World Break: Aria of Curse for a Holy Swordsman	Student	
2017	The Idolmaster Cinderella Girls Theater	Kaoru Ryūzaki	
2018	Crayon Shin-chan	Child C, female employee B, child B, Deriharu Moto	
2018	The Girl in Twilight	Schoolgirl (ep 1), Official (ep 3)	
2019	Aikatsu Friends! ~Kagayaki no Jewel~	Sakuya Impersonator	
2020	Infinite Dendrogram	Milianne Grandria	
2020	Lapis Re:Lights	Student (ep 8)	
2020	Case Closed	Nurse (ep 982)	
2020	Noblesse	Schoolgirl (ep 7)	
2021	Nintama Rantarō	Young Monk	
2021	Aikatsu Planet!	Client	
2021	Takt Op. Destiny	Marie (ep 1)	
2022	Phantom of the Idol	(ep 1)	
2022	Uchū Nanchara Kotetsu-kun	Atsuko	
2022	Sylvanian Families	Piers, Fauna, Obake-chan, Milo	
2023	Kubo Won't Let Me Be Invisible	Schoolgirl B (ep 2)	
2023	The Idolmaster Cinderella Girls U149	Kaoru Ryūzaki	
2024	Red Cat Ramen	Makurazaki (ep 5)	
2025	Medalist	Inori Yuitsuka	
2026	Oh Boy, Was I Wrong About Her	Minamo Mitake	
2026	Even the Student Council Has Its Holes!	Tatsuko Aoki	

=== Anime films ===
Year	Title	Role	Ref.
2018	Hug! Pretty Cure Futari wa Pretty Cure: All Stars Memories	Child	
2027	Gekijōban Medalist	Inori Yuitsuka	

=== Original vídeo animation ===
Year	Title	Role	Ref.
2019	The Idolmaster Cinderella Girls U149	Kaoru Ryūzaki	

=== Original net animation ===
Year	Title	Role	Ref.
2018	Mausu Doubutsuen	Enaga no Natsumi	
2020	Mausu Doubutsuen Meisaku Gekijō	Enaga no Natsumi	
2021	The Idolmaster Cinderella Girls Theater Extra Stage	Kaoru Ryūzaki	

=== Video games ===
Year	Title	Role	Ref.
2015	Yuki Yuuna is a Hero: Memories of the Sea of Trees		
2015	Kaden Shōjo	Otone	
2015	The Idolmaster Cinderella Girls	Kaoru Ryūzaki	
2015	BraveSword X BlazeSoul	Mitia, Celaeno Fragment, Brinicle	
2018	Shirohime Quest	Karatsu Castle, Shobata Castle	
2018	Vital Gear	Shano, Eary	
2018	Tenka Hyakken -Shin-	Nihon'ichi Norishige	
2019	Seventh Dark	Cathy	
2019	Guns of Soul 2	Shisune	
2019	Girls x Battle 2	Kyocho, Senbonzakura, Isau	
2019	Auto Chess	Abyssal Crawler	
2020	Hōchi Shōjo ~ Hyakka Ryōran no Moe Himetachi	Yang Xiu, Bai Qi, and Tian Feng	
2020	War of the Visions: Final Fantasy Brave Exvius	Mia	
2020	Vivid Army	Sorin	
2020	Yōkai Momohime-tan!	Kinko	
2020	Celestial Craft Fleet	Cortège	
2021	Port Mirage	Yi Chen	
2021	Senjō no Fugue	Chick Montblanc	
2023	Senjō no Fugue 2	Chick Montblanc	
2024	Blue Archive	Ibuki Tanga	

=== Drama CD ===
Year	Title	Role	Ref.
2014	The Kawai Complex Guide to Manors and Hostel Behavior	Clerk B	
2015	The Idolmaster Cinderella Girls "Treasure of Exploration	Kaoru Ryūzaki	
2017	The Idolmaster Cinderella Girls U149 (2017-2018)	Kaoru Ryūzaki	
2018	Mausu Theater Vol.020	Manager	
2018	Watashi no Hero ni Shukufuku!!	Guami	
2018	Boku no Omawarisan	Chico	
2018	Mausu Theater Vol.023, Vol.027-Vol.028	Natsuki Toura	
2019	Mausu Theater Vol.033	Manager	
2020	Boku no Omawarisan 2	Chico	
2020	Mausu Theater Vol.043-Vol.048	Manager	
2019	Boku no Omawarisan 3	Chico	

=== Overseas Dubbing ===
==== Animation ====
Year	Title	Role	Ref.
2019	101 Dalmatian Street	Dorothy, Clarissa	

== Discography ==
=== Character Songs ===
Release date	Title	Artist	Track listing
2015
June 22, 2015	The Idolmaster Cinderella Girls Starlight Master Seasons 03 Hi-Fi☆Days	Chie Sasaki (Asaka Imai), Momoka Sakurai (Haruka Terui), Nina Ichihara (Misaki Kuno), Kaoru Ryūzaki (Natsumi Haruse), Miria Akagi (Tomoyo Kurosawa)	Hi-Fi☆Days
August 2, 2015	The Idolmaster Cinderella Girls 4th Live TriCastle Story Starlight Castle Venue Original CD	Kaoru Ryūzaki (Natsumi Haruse)	Hi-Fi☆Days
2017
July 28, 2017	The Idolmaster Cinderella Girls U149 Volume 1 Special Edition Bonus CD	Nina Ichihara (Misaki Kuno), Kaoru Ryūzaki (Natsumi Haruse)	Orange Sapphire
2018
March 7, 2018	The Idolmaster Cinderella Master Illusionista!	Chie Sasaki (Asaka Imai), Momoka Sakurai (Haruka Terui), Nina Ichihara (Misaki Kuno), Kaoru Ryūzaki (Natsumi Haruse), Miria Akagi (Tomoyo Kurosawa)	Yes! Party Time!!
April 11, 2018	The Idolmaster Cinderella Girls Starlight Master Seasons Spring!	Yuzu Kitami (Larissa Tago Takeda), Mio Honda (Sayuri Hara), Kaoru Ryūzaki (Natsumi Haruse)	Spring Screaming
May 30, 2018	The Idolmaster Cinderella Girls U149 Volume 4 Special Edition Bonus CD	Momoka Sakurai (Haruka Terui), Chie Sasaki (Asaka Imai), Arisu Tachibana (Amina Sato), Haru Yūki (Makoto Koichi), Kaoru Ryūzaki (Natsumi Haruse)	Doremi Factory
September 12, 2018	The Idolmaster Cinderella Girls Little Stars! Natsukko Ondo	Miria Akagi (Tomoyo Kurosawa), Chie Sasaki (Asaka Imai), Rika Jōgasaki (Nozomi Yamamoto), Arisu Tachibana (Amina Sato), Haru Yuuki (Makoto Koichi), Kaoru Ryūzaki (Natsumi Haruse)	Natsukko Ondo
September 12, 2018	The Idolmaster Cinderella Girls Little Stars! Natsukko Ondo	Kaoru Ryūzaki (Natsumi Haruse)	Natsukko Ondo
November 9, 2018	The Idolmaster Cinderella Girls 6th Live Merry-Go-Roundome!!! Master Seasons Spring! Solo Remix	Kaoru Ryūzaki (Natsumi Haruse)	Spring Screaming
2020
April 29, 2020	Hyakka Ryōran Vol. 2	Toragoze no Tachi (Natsumi Takamori), Nikkō Sukezane (Sakura Nakamura), Nihon'ichi Norishige (Natsumi Haruse)	Koi no Daiundōkai
2021
April 30, 2021	The Idolmaster Cinderella Girls U149 Volume 7 Special Edition Bonus CD	Kaoru Ryūzaki (Natsumi Haruse)	Hanamaru Mark wo Sagase!
September 22, 2021	The Idolmaster Cinderella Girls Starlight Master Gold Rush! 10 Hungry Bambi	Chie Sasaki (Asaka Imai), Nina Ichihara (Misaki Kuno), Arisu Tachibana (Amina Sato), Kaoru Ryūzaki (Natsumi Haruse), Atsumi Munakata (Ayaka Fujimoto), Kozue Yusa (Maki Hanatani)	Hungry Bambi (Master Version)
September 22, 2021	The Idolmaster Cinderella Girls Starlight Master Gold Rush! 10 Hungry Bambi	Kaoru Ryūzaki (Natsumi Haruse)	Hungry Bambi (Master Version)
2023
March 1, 2023	The Idolmaster Cinderella Girls Starlight Master R/Lock On! 13 Chikara! Is! Power!	Risa Matoba (Hana Tamegai), Kaoru Ryūzaki (Natsumi Haruse), Kozue Yusa (Maki Hanatani), Chie Sasaki (Asaka Imai)	Coco☆Nut
April 19, 2023	The Idolmaster Cinderella Girls U149 Animation Master 01 Shine in the Sky☆	U149	Shine in the Sky☆
April 19, 2023	The Idolmaster Cinderella Girls U149 Animation Master 01 Shine in the Sky☆	Kaoru Ryūzaki (Natsumi Haruse)	Shine in the Sky☆
May 10, 2023	The Idolmaster Cinderella Girls U149 Animation Master 02 Yorimichi Little Star	U149	Yorimichi Little Star
May 17, 2023	The Idolmaster Cinderella Girls Starlight Master R/Lock On! 16 Gyōten! Sea World!	Nanami Asari (Honoka Inoue), Miku Maekawa (Natsumi Takamori), Nina Ichihara (Misaki Kuno), Atsumi Munakata (Ayaka Fujimoto), Kaoru Ryūzaki (Natsumi Haruse)	Gyōten! Sea World!
May 17, 2023	The Idolmaster Cinderella Girls Starlight Master R/Lock On! 16 Gyōten! Sea World!	Kaoru Ryūzaki (Natsumi Haruse)	Gyōten! Sea World!
July 21, 2023	The Idolmaster Cinderella Girls U149 Animation Master 04 Zero to One!!	U149	Zero to One!!
July 28, 2023	The Idolmaster Cinderella Girls U149 Animation Master 05 Good Day, Good Night	U149	Good Day, Good Night
July 28, 2023	The Idolmaster Cinderella Girls U149 Animation Master 05 Good Day, Good Night	Arisu Tachibana (Amina Sato), Haru Yūki (Makoto Koichi), Kaoru Ryūzaki (Natsumi Haruse)	Sun♡Flower
July 28, 2023	The Idolmaster Cinderella Girls U149 Animation Master 05 Good Day, Good Night	U149	Doremi Factory
July 5, 2023	The Idolmaster Cinderella Girls U149 Animation Master 06 Kirameki☆	U149	Kirameki☆
July 5, 2023	The Idolmaster Cinderella Girls U149 Animation Master 06 Kirameki☆	Kaoru Ryūzaki (Natsumi Haruse)	Kirameki☆
2024
February 2, 2024	The Idolmaster Cinderella Girls Unit Live Tour ConnecTrip! Ishikawa Performance & Yamagata Performance & Iwate Performance Original CD	Kaoru Ryūzaki (Natsumi Haruse)	Zero to One!!
April 6, 2024	The Idolmaster Cinderella Girls Unit Live Tour ConnecTrip! Osaka Performance & Fukuoka Performance & Tokyo Performance Original CD	Kaoru Ryūzaki (Natsumi Haruse)	Good Day, Good Night; Sun♡Flower

=== Other ===
Release date	Title	Artist	Track listing
2015
February 8, 2017	The Idolmaster Cinderella Girls Unit Live Tour ConnecTrip! Osaka Performance & Fukuoka Performance & Tokyo Performance Original CD	Ayaka Ōhashi, Ayaka Fukuhara, Sayuri Hara, Kotomi Aihara, Shiki Aoki, Ruriko Aoki, Yuko Iida, Hiromi Igarashi, Asaks Imai, Sumire Uesaka, Maaya Uchida, Chiyo Ousaki, Naomi Ōzora, Yuka Ōtsubo, Mayumi Kaneko, Yūki Kaneko, Juri Kimura, Tomoyo Kurosawa, Amina Sato, Shino Shimoji, Aya Suzaki, Eri Suzuki, Asami Takano, Natsumi Takamori, Rika Tachibana, Atsumi Tanezaki, Haruka Chisuga, Nao Tōyama, Mina Nagashima, Yuko Hara, Saori Hayami, Natsumi Haruse, Mai Fuchigami, Yui Makino, Eriko Matsui, Rei Matsuzaki, Marie Miyake, Tomo Muranaka, Mako Morino, Kiyono Yasuno, Nanami Yamashita, Nozomi Yamamoto, Haruka Yoshimura, Ru Thing, Azumi Waki	Evermore (4th Live Mix)
February 28, 2019	Mausu Theater Vol.031	Natsumi Haruse	You-niverse
August 8, 2020	Mausu Theater Vol.047	Natsumi Haruse	Virtual and Universe
