= Ayaka Fujimoto =

Japanese voice actor

- 藤本 彩花
- Born: December 28; Hyōgo Prefecture, Japan
- Occupation: Voice actor
- Years active: 2015-present
- Agent: Early Wing
- Notable work: The Idolmaster Cinderella Girls as Atsumi Munakata
- Height: 145.6 cm (4 ft 9 in)

Ayaka Fujimoto (藤本 彩花, Fujimoto Ayaka; born December 28) is a Japanese voice actress from Hyōgo Prefecture, Japan.

== Filmography ==
=== Anime ===
2017

- The Idolmaster Cinderella Girls Theater season 2 as Atsumi Munakata (ep 10)

2018

- The Idolmaster Cinderella Girls Theater season 3 as Atsumi Munakata (ep 2)

2019

- The Idolmaster Cinderella Girls Theater Climax Season as Atsumi Munakata (eps 4, 6)

2020

- Idolish7: Second Beat! Audience C (ep 15)

=== Web anime ===
2016

- Kobe Women's University History Department Promotion WEB Animation "Historical" as Shiki Kanotsuno

2020

- The Idolmaster Cinderella Girls Theater: Extra Stage as Atsumi Munakata (ep 16)

2022

- Cinderella Girls 10th Anniversary Celebration Animation Eternity Memories as Atsumi Munakata

=== Video games ===
2015

- Hoshi no Rebellion as Mary the First

2017

- Tenkū no Craft Fleet as Rina, Soul
- Tokyo Clanpool

2018

- The Idolmaster Cinderella Girls as Atsumi Munakata
- The Idolmaster Cinderella Girls Starlight Stage as Atsumi Munakata
- Fight League as Ribon

2019

- Valkyrie Connect as Soable

2020

- Hiyoko Shachō no Machizukuri as Bonjiri
- Mary Skelter: Nightmares as Elie

2021

- Yotsume-shin -Saikai- as Shiro
- Black Surgenight as Hiyō, Conner
- Disgaea RPG as Tria

2023

- Roppongi Sadistic Night as Kyou Yoshisato, Hiro Yoshisato

2024

- Death end re;Quest Code Z as Sanae Tōyama

2025

- Fuuraiki 5 as Aika Tabuchi

=== Drama CD ===
- Tengoku ni Ichiban Chikai Kuni!? as Mami Kitayama
- Subarashiki Jikan Ryokō!? as Nana Kuromori

=== Digital Comics ===
- Kawai Sugiru Danshi ga Oie de Matteimasu as Reo's junior
- Onidake no Yoru as Mitsu
- Ashita Kara wa Seiso-san as Mei Hanae
- Seishun Cinderella as Female Client A
- Nina-san no Mahō Seikatsu as Nimuru
- Saki-chan wa Inma no Ko (Gasshō) as Mika
- Salamandra no Shūshin as daughter

=== Overseas dubbing ===
==== Animation ====
- Duda & Dada as Oguri

=== Radio ===
- Fujimoto Ayaka no Honki! AniLove (2018-2019, 超!A&G+)
- Fujimoto Ayaka no Nyandeyanen (2019, &CAST!!!アワー ラブエール!)
- Fujimoto Ayaka to Nagano Yuki no Dream★Étude (2019–present, &CAST!!!アワー ラブエール!)

=== ASMR ===
2022

- Sakuragi Academy Soothing Society Class 1A - Konoha Ueno ~Fluffy Ear Cleaning~ as Konoha Ueno

== =Stage Shows ==
- A Reading Session for You: "STARMARIE's Voice and Fantasy World Vol. 5" (November 5, 2022, MsmileBOX Shibuya)
- A Reading Session for You: Special Edition "Promised Valentine" (February 11, 2023, MsmileBOX Shibuya)
- A Reading Session for You: Short Story Reading Collection "Pale Light Iris" (May 7, 2023, MsmileBOX Shibuya)
- A Reading Session for You: "The Forest of Memories and Lumina Strain" (October 7, 2023, MsmileBOX Shibuya)
- A Reading Session for You: "VOICEinBOX ~Voice Actors, It's Your Turn~" Vol. 6 (November 23, 2023, MsmileBOX Shibuya)
- A Reading Session for You: "VOICEinBOX ~Voice Actors, It's Your Turn~ Vol. 14 (April 13, 2025, MsmileBOX Shibuya)
- A Reading Session for You: "Gokan!" (July 6-7, 2024, MsmileBOX Shibuya)
- A Reading Session for You: "Valentine's Secret" (February 9, 2025, MsmileBOX Shibuya)

== Discography ==
=== Character Songs ===
Release date	Title	Artist	Track listing
2018
April 11, 2018	The Idolmaster Cinderella Girls Starlight Master Seasons Spring!	Hiromi Seki (Saya Aizawa), Yukari Mizumoto (Akane Fujita), Atsumi Munakata (Ayaka Fujimoto)	Harurunrun
July 31, 2018		Atsumi Munakata (Ayaka Fujimoto)	Onegai! Cinderella (Atsumi Solo ver.)
October 17, 2018	The Idolmaster Cinderella Girls Starlight Master 22! Sōyoku no Aria	Shizuku Oikawa (Yuri Noguchi), Atsumi Munakata (Ayaka Fujimoto)	shabon song ~For SS3A rearrange Mix~
April 11, 2018	The Idolmaster Cinderella Girls 6th Live Merry-Go-Roundome!!! Master Seasons Spring! Solo Remix	Atsumi Munakata (Ayaka Fujimoto)	Harurunrun (Atsumi Solo ver.)
2019
April 17, 2019	The Idolmaster Cinderella Girls Little Stars! Kyun Kyun Max	Shiki Ichinose (Kotomi Aihara), Yūki Otokura (Yuki Nakashima, Noriko Shiina (Chiyo Tomaru), Miku Maekawa (Natsumi Takamori), Atsumi Munakata (Ayaka Fujimoto)	Kyun Kyun Max
April 17, 2019	The Idolmaster Cinderella Girls Little Stars! Kyun Kyun Max	Atsumi Munakata (Ayaka Fujimoto)	Kyun Kyun Max (Atsumi Solo ver.)
2020
February 19, 2020	The Idolmaster Cinderella Master 3chord for the Dance!	Frederica Miyamoto (Asami Takano), Atsumi Munakata (Ayaka Fujimoto), Shizuku Oikawa (Yuri Noguchi), Hina Araki (Rui Tanabe), Yuki Himekawa (Mako Morino)	Mirror Ball Love
June 10, 2020	The Idolmaster Cinderella Girls Starlight Master 39 O-Ku-Ri-Mo-No Sunday!	Atsumi Munakata (Ayaka Fujimoto)	Zenryoku☆Summer!
September 16, 2020	The Idolmaster Cinderella Girls Starlight Master Gold Rush! 01 Go Just Go!	Yui Ōtsuki (Nanami Yamashita), Riamu Yumemi (Seena Hoshiki), Karen Hōjō (Mai Fuchigami), Shin Satō (Yumiri Hanamori), Shiki Ichinose (Kotomi Aihara), Kako Takafuji (Rana Morishita), Atsumi Munakata (Ayaka Fujimoto), Mizuki Kawashima (Nao Tōyama), Kyōko Igarashi (Atsumi Tanezaki)	Go Just Go! (Master Version)
September 16, 2020	The Idolmaster Cinderella Girls Starlight Master Gold Rush! 01 Go Just Go!	Atsumi Munakata (Ayaka Fujimoto)	Go Just Go! (Master Version)
November 11, 2020	The Idolmaster Cinderella Girls Little Stars Extra! Diamond Attention	Atsumi Munakata (Ayaka Fujimoto)	Oyamatope♪
2021
September 22, 2021	The Idolmaster Cinderella Girls Starlight Master Gold Rush! 10 Hungry Bambi	Chie Sasaki (Asaka Imai), Nina Ichihara (Misaki Kuno), Arisu Tachibana (Amina Satō), Kaoru Ryūzaki (Natsumi Haruse), Atsumi Munakata (Ayaka Fujimoto), Kozue Yusa (Maki Hanatani)	Hungry Bambi (Master Version)
September 22, 2021	The Idolmaster Cinderella Girls Starlight Master Gold Rush! 10 Hungry Bambi	Atsumi Munakata (Ayaka Fujimoto)	Hungry Bambi (Master Version)
2023
May 17, 2023	The Idolmaster Cinderella Girls Starlight Master/Lock On! 16 Gyōten! Sea World!	Nanami Asari (Honoka Inoue), Miku Maekawa (Natsumi Takamori), Nina Ichihara (Misaki Kuno), Atsumi Munakata (Ayaka Fujimoto), Kaoru Ryūzaki (Natsumi Haruse	Gyōten! Sea World!
May 17, 2023	The Idolmaster Cinderella Girls Starlight Master/Lock On! 16 Gyōten! Sea World!	Atsumi Munakata (Ayaka Fujimoto)	Gyōten! Sea World!

=== Other ===
Release date	Title	Artist	Track listing
December 29, 2018	Honki! AniLove Season 13 Theme Song	mirabilis (Yuka Amemiya, Ayaka Fujimoto, Fūka Izumi, Madoka Asahina)	Love Kimi Revolution☆
