= Medalist (manga) =

Japanese manga series

- First tankōbon volume cover, featuring Tsukasa Akeuraji (left) and Inori Yuitsuka (right)

メダリスト (Medarisuto)
- Genre: Drama; Sports
- Manga
- Written by: Tsurumaikada
- Published by: Kodansha
- English publisher: NA: Kodansha USA
- Imprint: Afternoon KC
- Magazine: Monthly Afternoon
- Original run: May 25, 2020 – present
- Volumes: 15
- Anime television series
- Directed by: Yasutaka Yamamoto
- Written by: Jukki Hanada
- Music by: Yuki Hayashi
- Studio: ENGI
- Licensed by: Disney Platform Distribution
- Original network: ANN (TV Asahi)
- Original run: January 5, 2025 – March 22, 2026
- Episodes: 22
- Anime film
- Directed by: Yasutaka Yamamoto
- Written by: Jukki Hanada
- Music by: Yuki Hayashi
- Studio: ENGI
- Released: February 19, 2027
- icon

Medalist (Japanese: メダリスト, Hepburn: Medarisuto) is a Japanese manga series written and illustrated by Tsurumaikada. It has been serialized in Kodansha's seinen manga magazine Monthly Afternoon since May 2020, with its chapters collected in fifteen tankōbon volumes as of July 2026. In North America, the manga is licensed for English release by Kodansha USA. An anime television series adaptation produced by ENGI aired from January to March 2025. A second season aired from January to March 2026. An anime film is set to premiere in Japan in February 2027.

Medalist won the Next Manga Award in the print category in 2022, the 68th Shogakukan Manga Award in the general category in 2023, and the 48th Kodansha Manga Award in the same category in 2024.

== Plot ==
Inori Yuitsuka, an 11-year-old girl in the fifth grade, dreams of becoming a world-class figure skater. While she practices in secret at her local ice rink, competitors her age are considered "too old" to begin seriously training; in addition, as her older sister's skating career ended in failure, her mother is resistant toward putting her through the same experience. A fateful meeting one day introduces her to Tsukasa Akeuraji, a former ice dancer on the edge of giving up competitive skating himself, and he agrees to become her coach and help her realize her dreams. Those around Inori soon learn she has immense natural talent for the sport and, together, the two strive toward Inori's ultimate goal of winning an Olympic gold medal.

== Characters ==
Inori Yuitsuka (結束 いのり, Yuitsuka Inori)
Voiced by: Natsumi Haruse (Japanese); Madeline Dorroh (English)
Tsukasa Akeuraji (明浦路 司, Akeuraji Tsukasa)
Voiced by: Takeo Ōtsuka (Japanese); Jonathon Ha (English)
Hitomi Takamine (高峰 瞳, Takamine Hitomi)
Voiced by: Emiri Katō (Japanese); Alejandra Reynoso (English)
Nozomi Yuitsuka (結束 のぞみ, Yuitsuka Nozomi)
Voiced by: Ami Koshimizu (Japanese); Erica Schroeder (English)
Mamoru Sekoma (瀬古間 衛, Sekoma Mamoru)
Voiced by: Manabu Muraji (Japanese); Steve Kramer (English)
Hikaru Kamisaki (狼嵜 光, Kamisaki Hikaru)
Voiced by: Kana Ichinose (Japanese); Grace Lu (English)
Jun Yodaka (夜鷹 純, Yodaka Jun)
Voiced by: Yuma Uchida (Japanese); Mark Whitten (English)
Rioh Sonidori (鴗鳥 理凰, Sonidori Riō)
Voiced by: Makoto Koichi (Japanese); Cristina Vee (English)
Ryoka Miketa (三毛田 涼佳, Miketa Ryōka)
Voiced by: Hina Kino (Japanese); Kitana Turnbull (English)
Mario Nachi (那智 鞠緒, Nachi Mario)
Voiced by: Megumi Toda (Japanese); Felecia Angelle (English)
Yudai Jakuzure (蛇崩 遊大, Jakuzure Yūdai)
Voiced by: Takahiro Miyake (Japanese); Kylen Deporter (English)
Suzu Kamoto (鹿本 すず, Kamoto Suzu)
Voiced by: Ayasa Itō (Japanese); Audrey Hsieh (English)
Ema Yamato (大和 絵馬, Yamato Ema)
Voiced by: Kotori Koiwai (Japanese); Cassandra Lee Morris (English)
Shinichiro Sonidori (鴗鳥 慎一郎, Sonidori Shinichirō)
Voiced by: Taito Ban (Japanese); Kaiji Tang (English)
Yuna Yagi (八木 夕凪, Yagi Yūna)
Voiced by: Natsuko Abe (Japanese); Analesa Fisher (English)
Rinna Sarukawa (申川 りんな, Sarukawa Rinna)
Voiced by: Mao Itō (Japanese); Xanthe Huynh (English)
Manaka Roba (炉場 愛花, Roba Manaka)
Voiced by: Maria Naganawa (Japanese); Diana Garnet (English)
Yotsuha Ushikawa (牛川 四葉, Ushikawa Yotsuha)
Voiced by: Minami Tanaka (Japanese); Lisa Reimold (English)
Kurumi Risu (離洲 くるみ, Risu Kurumi)
Voiced by: Hikaru Tono (Japanese); Sarah Wiedenheft (English)
Sana Niwatori (庭取 さな, Niwatori Sana)
Voiced by: Yūko Natsuyoshi (Japanese); Kimoy Lee (English)
Iruka Okazaki (岡崎 いるか, Okazaki Iruka)
Voiced by: Hibiku Yamamura (Japanese); Maya Aoki Tuttle (English)
Riina Kojoh (鯱城 理依奈, Kojō Rīna)
Voiced by: Kotomi Aihara (Japanese); Frankie Kevich (English)
Sakina Anaguma (穴熊 咲希奈, Anaguma Sakina)
Voiced by: Takako Tanaka (Japanese); Bella Stine (English)
Marika Kurione (栗尾根 茉莉花, Kurione Marika)
Voiced by: Ai Kayano
Kakeru Uobuchi (魚淵 翔, Uobuchi Kakeru)
Voiced by: Natsuki Hanae (Japanese); Paul Castro Jr. (English)
Miku Ahiru (亜昼 美玖, Ahiru Miku)
Voiced by: Konomi Inagaki (Japanese); Michaela Jill Murphy (English)
Kohei Kamogawa (鴨川 洸平, Kamogawa Kōhei)
Voiced by: Shōya Ishige (Japanese); Zachary Gordon (English)
Juna Shiratori (白鳥 珠那, Shiratori Juna)
Voiced by: Yūki Ono (Japanese); John Choi (English)

== Production ==
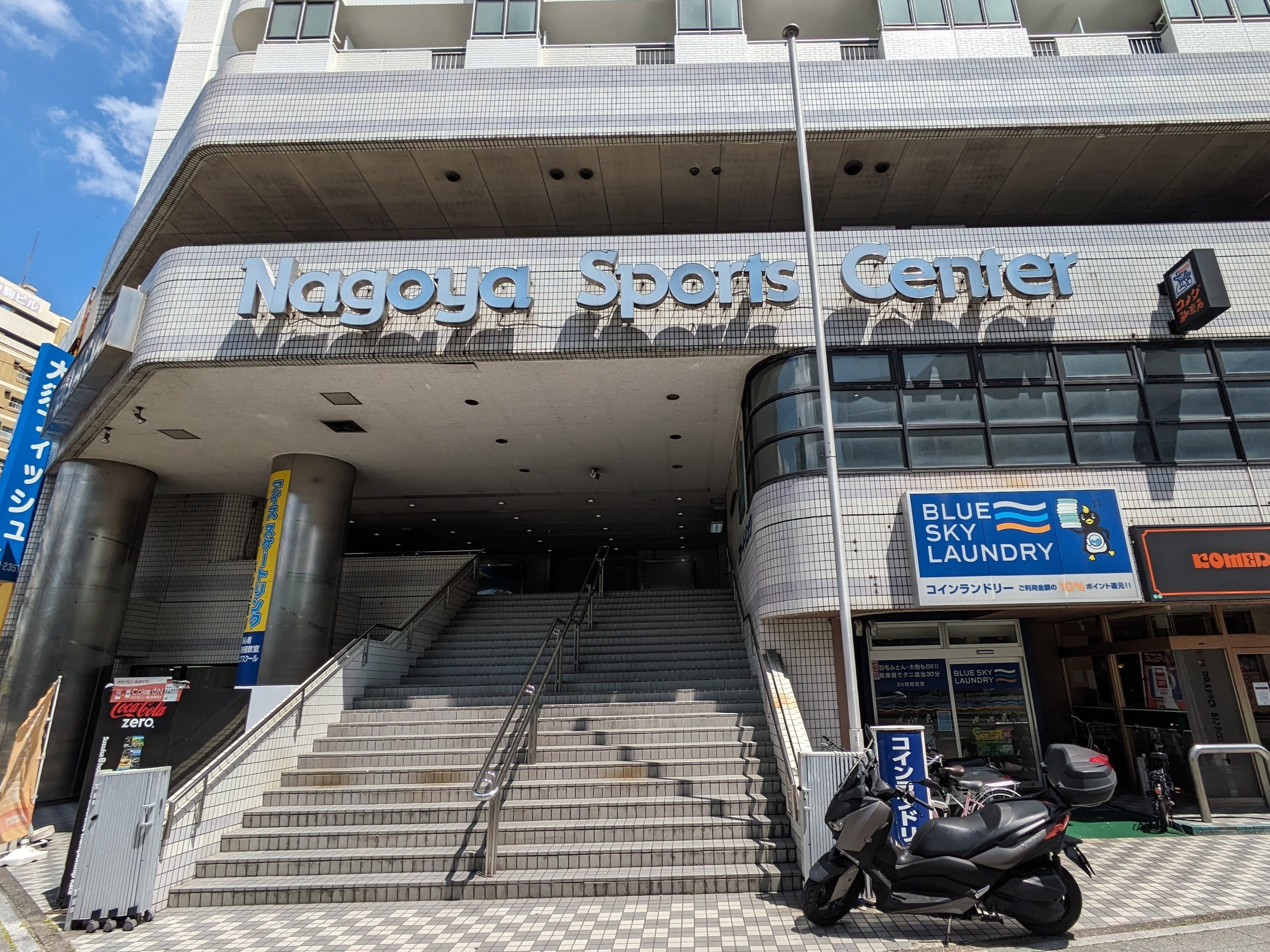
Nagoya Sports Center, in Naka-ku, Nagoya, featured as an early setting in the manga, and where the author enrolled in a skating class.

The story takes place in Nagoya, Aichi Prefecture. Its author, Tsurumaikada, is also from Aichi. While the manga is about figure skating, Tsurumaikada lacked experience and knowledge of the sport, and enrolled in a month-long figure skating class held in Nagoya Sports Center in Ōsu before beginning to illustrate the manga. Medalist is Tsurumaikada's first commercial work.

As a self-professed fan of Natsumi Haruse, a voice actress known for her role as Kaoru Ryūzaki in The Idolmaster Cinderella Girls U149, Tsurumaikada tweeted in 2018: "I would also like to draw a figure skating manga that would someday be made into an anime, and have Natsumi Haruse play the main role!" Haruse narrated the commercial for the release of the first volume of the manga series in 2020.

In September 2026, Tsurumaikada announced that the manga would take an indefinite hiatus due to "production circumstances."

== Media ==
=== Manga ===
Written and illustrated by Tsurumaikada, Medalist started in Kodansha's seinen manga magazine Monthly Afternoon on May 25, 2020. Kodansha has collected its chapters, referred to as "scores", into individual tankōbon volumes. The first volume was released on September 23, 2020. As of July 22, 2026, fifteen volumes have been released.

In March 2021, Kodansha USA announced the digital English release of the manga in North America, starting on May 18, 2021. At Anime Expo 2023, Kodansha USA announced that the series would be published in print. The first volume was released on March 5, 2024.

==== Volumes ====
No.	Original release date	Original ISBN	English release date	English ISBN
1	September 23, 2020	978-4-06-520783-3	May 18, 2021 (digital); March 5, 2024 (print)	978-1-63699-098-9 (digital); 979-8-88877-185-3 (print)
1. "Genius on Ice" (氷上の天才, Hyōjō no Tensai); 2. "The Preliminary Badge Test" (初級バッジテスト, Shokyū Bajji Tesuto); 3. "Taiyaki and Cake" (たい焼きとケーキ, Taiyaki to Kēki); Short Program 1: "Inori and the Birds" (いのりと小鳥, Inori to Kotori); Short Program 2: "Tsukasa and the Sushi" (司とお寿司, Tsukasa to o Sushi)
2	February 22, 2021	978-4-06-522253-9	June 15, 2021 (digital); May 7, 2024 (print)	978-1-63699-157-3 (digital); 979-8-88877-195-2 (print)
4. "Meikoh Cup, Girls' Preliminary (Part 1)" (名港杯 初級女子FS編①, Meikō-hai Shokyū Joshi FS-hen 1); 5. "Meikoh Cup, Girls' Preliminary (Part 2)" (名港杯 初級女子FS編②, Meikō-hai Shokyū Joshi FS-hen 2); 6. "Meikoh Cup, Girls' Novice B" (名港杯 ノービスB女子FS編, Meikō-hai Nōbisu Bī Joshi FS-hen); Short Program 3: "Night of the First Battle" (初戦の夜, Shosen no Yoru); 7. "Level 1 Badge Test" (1級バッジテスト, Ikkyū Bajji Tesuto); Short Program 4: "Beast of the Snowfield" (雪原の獣, Setsugen no Kemono)
3	June 23, 2021	978-4-06-523607-9	November 16, 2021 (digital); July 2, 2024 (print)	978-1-63699-469-7 (digital); 979-8-88877-196-9 (print)
8. "The Powers of the West (Part 1)" (西の強豪 前編, Nishi no Kyōgō Zenpen); 9. "The Powers of the West (Part 2)" (西の強豪 中編, Nishi no Kyōgō Chūhen); 10. "The Powers of the West (Part 3)" (西の強豪 後編, Nishi no Kyōgō Kōhen); 11. "I Hate the Night" (夜が嫌い, Yoru ga Kirai)
4	October 21, 2021	978-4-06-525162-1	April 19, 2022 (digital); September 24, 2024 (print)	978-1-68491-132-5 (digital); 979-8-88877-197-6 (print)
12. "Howling at the Night" (夜に吠える, Yoru ni Hoeru); 13. "Dance the Night" (夜を踊れ, Yoru o Odore); 14. "Morning Comes" (朝が来る, Asa ga Kuru); 15. "Shirone's Lesson" (白猫のレッスン, Shironeko no Ressun)
5	March 23, 2022	978-4-06-527132-2	October 18, 2022 (digital); November 5, 2024 (print)	978-1-68491-491-3 (digital); 979-8-88877-198-3 (print)
16. "The Athlete's Pledge" (選手宣誓, Senshu Sensei); 17. "The Gamble" (ギャンブル, Gyanburu); 18. "My Cards" (私のカード, Watashi no Kādo); 19. "The Queen's Leap" (女王のジャンプ, Joō no Janpu); Exhibition: "The Beast of Fire and Ice" (氷焔の獣, Hyōen no Kemono)
6	July 22, 2022	978-4-06-528515-2	February 21, 2023 (digital); January 7, 2025 (print)	978-1-68491-710-5 (digital); 979-8-88877-199-0 (print)
20. "Ascendance" (下克上, Gekokujō); 21. "Kiss and Cry" (キスアンドクライ, Kisu Ando Kurai); 22. "Beacon" (狼煙, Noroshi); 23. "Intensive Training" (強化練習, Kyōka Renshū)
7	December 22, 2022	978-4-06-529918-0	July 18, 2023 (digital); March 4, 2025 (print)	979-8-88933-039-4 (digital); 979-8-88877-200-3 (print)
24. "Typical Jumps" (よくある飛躍, Yoku Aru Hiyaku); 25. "Hot Passion" (熱血, Nekketsu); 26. "The Frozen Lake" (氷の湖, Kōri no Mizūmi); 27. "The Golden Egg" (金の卵, Kin no Tamago); 28. "The Vanishing Surface" (消える銀盤, Kieru Ginban)
8	May 23, 2023	978-4-06-531682-5	September 19, 2023 (digital); May 6, 2025 (print)	979-8-88933-148-3 (digital); 979-8-88877-201-0 (print)
29. "Open Practice" (公式練習, Kōshiki Renshū); 30. "Shallow Motives" (浅い動機, Asai Dōki); 31. "The Wizard" (魔法使い, Mahōtsukai); 32. "Kamisaki the Wolf" (狼, Ōkami)
9	October 23, 2023	978-4-06-533261-0	March 19, 2024 (digital); July 8, 2025 (print)	979-8-88933-416-3 (digital); 979-8-88877-315-4 (print)
33. "The Ahiru Child" (あひるの子, Ahiru no Ko); 34. "Quadruple Salchow" (4回転サルコウ, Yonkaiten Sarukou); 35. "Level 4" (レベル4, Reberu Fō); 36. "The Next Qualification" (目指す資格, Mezasu Shikaku)
10	March 22, 2024	978-4-06-535154-3	August 20, 2024 (digital); September 9, 2025 (print)	979-8-88933-695-2 (digital); 979-8-88877-451-9 (print)
37. "The Junior Grand Prix" (ジュニアGP, Junia GP); 38. "The Junior Rules" (ジュニアのルール, Junia no Rūru); 39. "Trial and Error" (試行錯誤, Shikōsakugo); 40. "The Teacher" (恩師, Onshi); Short Program 5: "Boys' Novice A" (ノービスA男子, Nōbisu Ei Danshi)
11	August 22, 2024	978-4-06-536472-7	January 7, 2025 (digital); November 11, 2025 (print)	979-8-89478-310-9 (digital); 979-8-88877-486-1 (print)
41. "Knight and Judoka" (騎士と柔, Kishi to Yawara); 42. "JPG Bangkok SP" (JGP第1戦バンコクSP, JGP Dai Issen Bankoku SP); 43. "The Girl at the Top" (一番上の少女, Ichiban-jō no Shōjo); 44. "Wounds and Fins" (傷と鰭, Kizu to Hire); 45. "Virtuous Maneuvering" (善意の策動, Zen'i no Sakudō); Short Program 6: "Junior Camp, Side B" (ジュニア合宿サイドB, Junia Gasshuku Saido Bī)
12	January 22, 2025	978-4-06-538012-3	June 17, 2025 (digital); January 13, 2026 (print)	979-8-89478-554-7 (digital); 979-8-88877-509-7 (print)
46. "Light and Shadow" (光と影, Hikari to Kage); 47. "Creatures of the Night" (夜の生き物, Yoru no Ikimono); 48. "The Promised Day" (約束の日, Yakusoku no Hi); Exhibition: "The Beast of Fire and Ice (Part 2)" (氷焔の獣, Hyōen no Kemono)
13	June 23, 2025	978-4-06-539705-3	January 13, 2026 (digital); September 8, 2026 (print)	979-8-89478-840-1 (digital); 979-8-88877-734-3 (print)
49. "All-Japan Junior Girls' Short Program" (全日本ジュニア女子SP, Zennihon Junia Joshi SP); 50. "Proof of Her Drive" (本気の証明, Honki no Shōmei); 51. "All-Japan Junior Girls' Free Skate (Part 1)" (全日本ジュニア女子FS (前編), Zennihon Junia Joshi FS (Zenpen)); 52. "All-Japan Junior Girls' Free Skate (Part 2)" (全日本ジュニア女子FS (後編), Zennihon Junia Joshi FS (Kōhen)); 53. "The Mermaid and the Blade" (人魚と刃, Ningyo to Yaiba); Short Program 8: "Shinichiro, Age 24" (慎一郎24歳, Shinichirō 24-sai)
14	January 22, 2026	978-4-06-541860-4	May 12, 2026 (digital)	979-8-89830-102-6 (digital)
54. "JGP China Finals" (JGPファイナル中国大会, JGP Fainaru Chūgoku Taikai); 55. "JGP China Finals Short Program (Part 1)" (JGPファイナル中国大会SP (前編), JGP Fainaru Chūgoku Taikai SP (Zenpen)); 56. "JGP China Finals Short Program (Part 2)" (JGPファイナル中国大会SP (後編), JGP Fainaru Chūgoku Taikai SP (Kōhen)); Exhibition: "The Beast of Fire and Ice (Part 3)" (氷焔の獣, Hyōen no Kemono); Short Program 7: "Tsukasa and His Mentor" (司と先輩, Tsukasa to Senpai)
15	July 22, 2026	978-4-06-544240-1	November 24, 2026 (digital)	979-8-89830-331-0 (digital)
57. Karasu no Nureba 1 (鴉の濡れ羽①); 58. Karasu no Nureba 2 (鴉の濡れ羽②); 59. Kioku no Kyori (記憶の距離); 60. Bokushi to Kohitsuji (牧師と子羊); 61. Rasen no Tochū (螺旋の途中)

=== Anime ===
An anime television series adaptation was announced on May 18, 2023. It is produced by ENGI and directed by Yasutaka Yamamoto, with series composition and episode screenplays being written by Jukki Hanada, character design by Chinatsu Kameyama, music composed by Yuki Hayashi, and the skating routines choreographed by figure skaters of retirees Akiko Suzuki and Yuhana Yokoi, alongside active figure skater Hinano Isobe. The series aired from January 5 to March 30, 2025, on the NUMAnimation programming block on all ANN affiliates, including TV Asahi. (Note: TV Asahi listed the series premiere on January 4, 2025, at 25:30, which is effectively January 5 at 1:30 a.m. JST.) The opening theme song is "Bow and Arrow", performed by Kenshi Yonezu, with two-time Olympic champion figure skater Yuzuru Hanyu starring in the music video. The ending song is "Atashi no Dress" (アタシのドレス; 'My Dress'), performed by Neguse.

The series streams on Disney+ worldwide and Hulu in the United States. The English dub also premiered on Hulu in January 2025.

After the airing of the final episode, a second season was announced. The staff and cast from the first season is returning to reprise their roles. The season aired from January 25 to March 22, 2026, on the same programming block. (Note: TV Asahi listed the season premiere on January 24, 2026, at 25:30, which is effectively January 25 at 1:30 a.m. JST.) The first two episodes of the season received an advanced screening at the Marunouchi Piccadilly on January 17. The opening theme is titled "Cold Night", performed by Hana while the ending theme is titled "Rookies", performed by Conton Candy.

An anime film set after the events of the second season was announced in January 2026. The film is distributed by Animec and is set to premiere in Japan on February 19, 2027.

==== Episodes ====
===== Season 1 (2025) =====
No. overall	No. in season	Title	Directed by	Storyboarded by	Original release date
1	1	"A Genius on the Ice"; Transliteration: "Hyōjō no Tensai" (Japanese: 氷上の天才)	Yasutaka Yamamoto	Yasutaka Yamamoto	January 5, 2025
Tsukasa Akeuraji is a former ice dancer who is now employed at a local ice rink for figure skating run by his former ice dance partner Hitomi Takemine. One day, Tsukasa catches an 11-year-old girl named Inori Yuitsuka attempting to skate at the rink without paying the entrance fee. At a nearby park, Inori explains that she wants to figure skate but her mother will not allow it. Tsukasa tries to motivate Inori by giving her the contact information of local figure skating coaches. The next day, Tsukasa is surprised to see Inori with her mother, Nozomi, consulting with Hitomi. Nozomi reveals that due to both Inori's age and what previously happened to her older sister, she plans to make Inori quit the sport via the coaches' advice. However, Tsukasa proposes to let him watch Inori first before making his decision, after which everyone discovers that Inori already knows the fundamentals, much to Tsukasa's delight. Seeing Inori's determination, and reminded how he was once in a similar situation, Tsukasa convinces Nozomi to allow him to be Inori's coach.
2	2	"Prelim Badge Test"; Transliteration: "Shokyū Bajji Tesuto" (Japanese: 初級バッジテスト)	Takahiro Hirata	Toshihiko Masuda	January 12, 2025
After a few days training under Tsukasa, Inori shows significant improvement. Tsukasa then informs Inori that a Badge Test will take place soon, which is a series of tests to determine a skater's skill level. Inori insists on taking it right away. On the day of the test, Inori encounters two other skaters, a girl and boy. While the girl is friendly, the boy, Rioh, is rude towards Inori. The experience leaves Inori nervous about taking the test, but Tsukasa successfully calms her down and she is able to pass the preliminary level test. While Nozomi is happy, she reminds Inori that she is only willing to allow her to skate until middle school. Back at the rink, Inori meets the girl she befriended, and realizes that she is Hikaru Kamisaki, an award winning novice skater. Upon hearing some parents criticizing Inori, Hikaru takes Inori to the ice and they skate together. Hikaru tells Inori that she dreams of going to the Olympics, and advises Inori that she should be more open about her desires. When Tsukasa arrives, Inori tells him her dream of being an Olympic gold medalist, which Tsukasa promises to help fulfill.
3	3	"Taiyaki and Cake"; Transliteration: "Taiyaki to Kēki" (Japanese: たい焼きとケーキ)	Shinichi Fukumoto	Shinichi Watanabe	January 19, 2025
Tsukasa decides that the best way to convince Nozomi that Inori is committed to skating is to win a competition, so he enrolls Inori in the Meikoh Cup. During practice, however, Inori struggles due to her stage fright. Tsukasa tries to help by showing her how he skates, which greatly impresses her and motivates her to improve. As they practice, they also meet coach Mario Nachi and her student Ryoka Miketa. Despite Ryoka's abrasive attitude, she and Inori end up befriending each other, but Ryoka has a falling out when Inori insists on practicing with Tsukasa. Seeing Ryoka's skill, Tsukasa advises Inori that she has to make a choice: either focus all the time they have left on mastering jumps, or focus on mastering the basics of dancing first. Inori ultimately decides to focus on the latter. As the competition nears, Inori has most of her program mastered except for the double Salchow jump. After seeing a dog chase its tail, Tsukasa has the idea of having Inori perform a flying sit spin instead. Inori manages to perform the flying sit spin flawlessly, which is encouraging since it is considered to be the more advanced move.
4	4	"Meikoh Cup, Junior Women's Prelim Free Skating (Part One)"; Transliteration: "Meikō-hai Shokyū Joshi FS (Mae)" (Japanese: 名港杯 初級女子FS（前）)	Manabu Kurihara	Shinichi Watanabe	January 26, 2025
Inori's older sister Mika returns home from Canada to visit as well as to see Inori skate at the Meikoh Cup, and Mika assures Inori that despite her appearance of disinterest, Nozomi is actually very enthusiastic about Inori skating. However, during the warmup session, Inori performs very poorly. Seeing this, Nozomi wants Tsukasa to lower the difficulty of her program. Overhearing this, Inori begins to lose self-confidence until she has the epiphany that she is already much different than she was before. She confronts Nozomi and insists that her program not change. When the competition starts, Inori initially falls but quickly recovers and performs the rest of her program flawlessly, ending with the flying sit spin. However, she shocks everybody, including Tsukasa, by following up with a broken leg sit spin, a move that she had only been able to perform once. Witnessing Inori's determination, Nozomi is finally convinced Inori can be a professional skater and decides to throw her full support behind her. Meanwhile, the judges award Inori with a score of 12.64, putting her in first place.
5	5	"Meikoh Cup, Junior Women's Prelim Free Skating (Part Two)"; Transliteration: "Meikō-hai Shokyū Joshi FS (Ato)" (Japanese: 名港杯 初級女子FS（後）)	Shinichi Fukumoto	Hideaki Uehara	February 2, 2025
Ryoka begins her program for the competition, and while she has a strong start, she accidentally misses a combo, which causes her to panic and forget to perform her planned recovery move. Despite landing her double Salchow jump perfectly, Ryoka only scores an 11.17, putting her in third place. Distressed at losing first place, Ryoka apologizes to Mario for her aggressive behavior, only for Mario to chastise her, pointing out that said aggressiveness is what makes her stand out from the other skaters and drives her to be better. Inori then approaches Ryoka in an attempt to rekindle their friendship, which Ryoka accepts, having a newfound respect for her. As the Novice level competition begins, Rioh arrives with his father, Olympic silver medalist skater Shinichiro Sonidori. Hikaru then performs her program, captivating the crowd and earning a score of 97.23. After the competition, Inori tries to meet Hikaru, but runs into her coach, gold medalist skater Jun Yodaka. Jun is skeptical that Tsukasa will be able to train Inori to a level where she can beat Hikaru, but Tsukasa swears to him that he will.
6	6	"The Night of the First Competition"; Transliteration: "Shosen no Yoru" (Japanese: 初戦の夜)	Hideaki Ōba	Toshihiko Masuda	February 9, 2025
Following the Meikoh Cup, Inori tells Tsukasa that she wants to take the level one Badge Test. Once Tsukasa agrees to arrange it, he tells Inori about his past. In a flashback, he was inspired to skate after he watched one of Jun's performances. Due to his age, however, no skating club would take him. In high school, he helped a woman named Meiko Kago and managed to get a part-time job at her husband's company as well as being treated as a member of her family. With his paycheck, he started training with Hitomi. They eventually were able to go to the All-Japans competition, but ended up in fourth place. Tsukasa then cut ties with the Kago family after Meiko died of an illness. Back in the present, Tsukasa unexpectedly runs into Koichi and Yo, Meiko's husband and daughter, once Inori leaves. Koichi soon reassures Tsukasa after the latter explains why he left. Realizing his mistake, Tsukasa decides to reconnect with Koichi and Yo. The next day at the rink, Inori tells Tsukasa how she is inspired by his life story, and they both decide to properly celebrate her winning the Meikoh Cup.
7	7	"Level One Badge Test"; Transliteration: "Ikkyū Bajji Tesuto" (Japanese: 1級バッジテスト)	Motohiro Abe	Motohiro Abe	February 16, 2025
Tsukasa starts preparations for Inori to take the level one Badge Test as well as compete in the West Japan Championship. In order to do so, he plans to add double jumps to her program. However, despite Inori insisting she was able to complete one on her own, she is unable to repeat it during practice. Tsukasa assure Inori that she does not need to rush. On the day of the test, Tsukasa and Inori encounter skaters Suzu Kamoto and Ema Yamato, along with their coach Yudai Jakuzure. Both Inori and Ema are able to pass the level one test while Suzu passes level seven. Tsukasa is impressed with Ema's skating and asks Yudai for coaching tip, which he agrees to. Working together, Yudai observes that only thing that Tsukasa really needs to resolve is his self-confidence issues as a coach. Over the next month, Inori is able to master the double loop jump thanks to Tsukasa's coaching. At the West Japan Championship, Inori encounters several other girls competing, including Suzu and Ema. However, during the warm up session, a distraught Inori realizes that she has misplaced her skates.
8	8	"Western Powerhouses (Part One)"; Transliteration: "Nishi no Kyōgō (Mae)" (Japanese: 西の強豪（前）)	Takahiro Hirata	Takahiro Hirata	February 23, 2025
Inori realizes that she left her skates on the train, so Tsukasa heads out to the train station to retrieve them. Trusting that Tsukasa will come back in time, Inori focuses on practicing her program. Meanwhile, skater Seira Shishido sets the bar for the competition by scoring a 23.37. Tsukasa is narrowly able to return in time for Inori to be present for the start of her group's programs. Kanna Kitora has a strong start with a 23.03, but leaves holes in the ice due to her strong toe jumps. Ritsuki Koguma goes next, but she misses a combo after tripping on one of the holes Kanna made. She manages to improvise a new combo and scores a 23.28. Miihi Kurosawa, a friend and rival of Seira, relies on her performance rather than stunts for her program, scoring a 23.34. Concerned, Inori asks Tsukasa whether she should improvise and add a double jump in her program to compete with the other skaters, but Tsukasa insists that if she can perfectly execute her program as is, she will be able to win first place. Inori then prepares to perform her program as everybody watches.
9	9	"Western Powerhouses (Part Two)"; Transliteration: "Nishi no Kyōgō (Ato)" (Japanese: 西の強豪（後）)	Yūki Kanazawa	Shigehisa Īda	March 2, 2025
Inori performs her program, and despite suffering from muscle fatigue, she emulates Tsukasa's moves and is able to complete it flawlessly and scores a 24.32, putting her in first place. However, she suffers a sprained ankle. Despite her injury, Inori insists on staying long enough to watch Ema's performance. When Ema's program starts, she recalls how she struggled in training due to her growth spurts prior to Yudai becoming her coach. She pulls off an array of highly complex moves and scores a 25.57. Ema and Seira take first and third place, respectively, with Seira and Miihi joining Ritsuki's club. On the train ride home, Tsukasa warns Inori that she will need to take a break due to her likely having shin splints, which could lead to a stress fracture. Inori reflects on the competition and promises that despite the gap in experience between herself and her rivals, she will not give up on her dream. Five days later, Tsukasa promises Yudai that he and Inori will impress him at next year's All-Japans competition. Elsewhere, Hikaru wins the West Japan Novice B competition while Rioh angrily curses at his father as he congratulates Hikaru.
10	10	"Howling at Night"; Transliteration: "Yoru ni Hoeru" (Japanese: 夜に吠える)	Hideaki Ōba	Shinichi Watanabe	March 9, 2025
One year later, Inori takes first place in the level five division at her second Meikoh Cup, having made significant improvement. All she needs to do is pass the level six Badge Test in order to qualify for the All-Japans Novice A division so she can compete against Hikaru. However, Tsukasa notes that level six is the most difficult level to pass, requiring mastery of the double Axel jump. During practice, Tsukasa is called away to meet Rioh and his father, Shinichiro. Shinichiro explains that Rioh's progress has stagnated, so he wants him to temporarily be placed under Tsukasa's tutelage. Rioh, however, proves difficult to get along with. Inori eventually loses her temper and challenges Rioh, stating that she will reach level six before him and defeat Hikaru. After practice, Tsukasa has a private meeting with Inori where the latter reveals that she can already perform a double Axel jump on land, but cannot perform it on ice yet. Realizing Inori is already physically capable of performing the move, Tsukasa decides to accelerate her training.
11	11	"Dance the Night"; Transliteration: "Yoru o Odore" (Japanese: 夜を踊れ)	Mitsuo Hashimoto	Motohiro Abe	March 16, 2025
Inori participates in a special training camp along with the rest of her club, with Mario attending as a guest coach. Mario takes note of Tsukasa's enthusiasm, but Hitomi warns her that his greatest weakness is his lack of self-confidence. After the first day of training, Tsukasa encounters Rioh in the bathhouse. When asked about his training goals, Rioh claims that he has hit a wall and is skeptical of Tsukasa's qualification to be a coach since he only passed the Prelim level Badge Test. Initially discouraged by Rioh's pessimism, Tsukasa fires himself up by swearing to teach Rioh how to master a triple-double combo. Meanwhile, Inori confides with Ryoka that she hopes she can pass the level six Badge Test to prove Tsukasa is a worthy coach. The next day, Inori finally manages to land both her first double Axel jump and triple Salchow jump, while Rioh continues to struggle. Witnessing Inori's success, Rioh is reminded of how quickly Hikaru surpassed him. Tsukasa privately meets Rioh again and deduces that Rioh's pessimism comes from him being unable to match Jun's skill. Now knowing the problem, Tsukasa prepares a new training routine for Rioh.
12	12	"Shirone's Lesson"; Transliteration: "Shironeko no Ressun" (Japanese: 白猫のレッスン)	Takahiro Hirata	Hiroyuki Oshima	March 23, 2025
Tsukasa starts by performing Rioh's program himself, and completes it flawlessly. Rioh is shocked at how Tsukasa's skating actually rivals Jun's, and Hitomi points out that when they were partners in ice dancing, Tsukasa had to work hard on his skills to be able to keep pace with her. Recognizing Tsukasa's skill, Rioh finally comes around to accepting him as his coach. The next day, the guest coach Tsukasa invited, Kohaku Shirone, arrives at the training camp. Shirone was invited due to his expertise in ballet, which will also serve to help the skaters in their performances. However, having never taken ballet classes, Inori struggles to keep up with the rest of the class, which motivates her to work even harder. With everything they learned, Inori, Rioh, and Ryoka quickly master their triple-double combos. As the training camp ends, Inori confides to Tsukasa about how much fun she has had skating, and looks forward to improving even more in the future.
13	13	"Morning Arrives"; Transliteration: "Asa ga Kuru" (Japanese: 朝が来る)	Yasutaka Yamamoto	Shinichi Watanabe	March 30, 2025
Inori prepares to take the level six Badge Test. She encounters Hikaru on the way to the testing site and promises she will pass the test so she can compete against her in the Nationals, to Hikaru's delight. She and Tsukasa also meet Rioh and Shinichiro, with the latter thanking Tsukasa for helping Rioh achieve a breakthrough in his training. During the actual test, Inori reflects on how she was one year ago, and accepts that even though she was weak in the past, she is resolved to becoming a better skater in the future. Rioh also takes part in the test and manages to complete his program, much to his surprise. As the judges announce the test results, Inori begins to have a panic attack but is calmed down by Rioh before they both learn they have passed. Afterwards, Inori declares to herself that she will surpass and defeat her friends and rivals to win the gold medal.

===== Season 2 (2026) =====
No. overall	No. in season	Title	Directed by	Storyboarded by	Original release date
14	1	"The Athlete's Pledge"; Transliteration: "Senshu Sensei" (Japanese: 選手宣誓)	Yasutaka Yamamoto	Shinichi Watanabe	January 25, 2026
Tsukasa prepares for Inori to compete in the Chubu Block Tournament, where 15 skaters will compete for five Novice slots in the All-Japans. Inori attends the tournament's opening ceremony where she meets her rival skaters and learns that Hikaru decided not to attend since she is already seeded. Instead, she is taking the opportunity to train further in Russia, where Jun recalls how Hikaru was adopted into his family due to the unnatural charisma she possesses. Inori is then excited to seek Olympian skater Riina Kojoh attend the opening ceremony and asks her what it takes to reach the Olympics. Riina gladly answers, pointing out the most surefire way is to win gold at the All-Japans during an Olympic year. She then boasts she will do so for a second time. Afterwards, both Tsukasa and Inori encounter Koichi, who wanted to come to see Tsukasa coach. Inori then prepares for the start of the tournament.
15	2	"My Cards"; Transliteration: "Watashi no Kādo" (Japanese: 私のカード)	Hideaki Ōba	Shinichi Watanabe	February 1, 2026
Koichi and Yoh observe the tournament as spectators, and Mamoru helps explain the rules and strategies of figure skating to them. The first to skate is Rinna Sarukawa, who despite her nervousness at skating first is able to secure a strong 70.02 score thanks to her opening Triple Lutz jump. The next four skaters attempt to beat Rinna's score but all fall short due to making critical errors. However, despite their setbacks, they all persevere to complete their performances so as not to disappoint their coaches. Recalling watching Tsukasa endlessly practice, Yoh finally comes to appreciate the effort figure skaters put into their performances and begins cheers the skaters on. The next notable skater is Manaka Roba, who takes a risk by saving her complex jumps for the end of her performance to earn bonus points. Despite several mistakes, she lands her final combination jump and earns a 72.62 score, putting her first place over Rinna. With Rinna knocked down to second, another skater on her team promises to their coach, Shinichiro, that she will win the gold medal.
16	3	"The Queen's Leap"; Transliteration: "Joō no Janpu" (Japanese: 女王のジャンプ)	Saori Yamamoto	Shinichi Watanabe	February 8, 2026
As a child, Yuna Yagi was inspired to take up figure skating after watching Shinichiro's Olympic run, joining his team shortly afterwards. In the present, Yuna prepares for her performance and encounters Inori by chance. As Shinichiro once again thanks Tsukasa for training Rioh, Yuna is shocked at him showing deference to another coach, starting a rivalry between her and Inori. Rioh then warns Inori that Yuna was once considered their team's second best skater until Hikaru joined. Wary of Inori's growth, Shinichiro advises Yuna to start with a safer triple Lutz double loop combination jump. However, jealous of the attention Hikaru receives, Yuna instead performs a more difficult triple Lutz triple loop jump, a feat only Hikaru has accomplished as a Novice. Despite several errors, Yuna presents a powerful performance that earns a standing ovation. While she disobeyed him, Shinichiro ends up praising her performance. Thanks to her powerful start, Yuna earns a 80.03 score, putting her in first place. Inori then prepares for her performance, which contains a secret strategy Tsukasa is sure will win the gold medal. Tsukasa gives Inori a pep talk, and she assures him that she will win.
17	4	"Ascendance"; Transliteration: "Gekokujō" (Japanese: 下剋上)	Kōhei Kawai	Masashi Okumura	February 15, 2026
Inori has an amazing performance that concludes with her doing an extremely complex double axel - Euler - Triple Salchow combination jump. As a result, she earns a score of 81.20, putting her in first place. As Koichi and Yoh look on, Koichi comes to the realization the biggest appeal of figure skating is watching miracles occur. Inori ends up winning the gold medal, while the other skaters are left to cope with their losses in various ways. Once Inori heads home, Tsukasa is invited to a party. At said party, he meets Rintaro Chiwa, Atsuhi Wani and Shoya Kijita, the other coaches whose skaters have secured a spot in the All-Japans. Rintaro explains that they want to create a strategy where the Chubu Block skaters dominate the All-Japans. In addition, Tsukasa learns that Jun being Hikaru's coach is not public knowledge. After the party, Shinichiro privately meets with Tsukasa and asks why he created such a risky program. Tsukasa reveals that ever since mastering the Triple Salchow, Inori has a 100% success rate performing that move. He also admits that he went all out to not only prove Inori can challenge Hikaru, but also that he himself can challenge Jun.
18	5	"Beacon"; Transliteration: "Noroshi" (Japanese: 狼煙)	Takaaki Azuma	Masashi Okumura	February 22, 2026
Shinichiro invites Tsukasa to his home, where they are joined by Jun. Shinichiro then takes the both of them to the ice rink for a private practice session where Tsukasa has the opportunity to see Jun skate in person. Shinichiro reveals that after Jun became depressed following his retirement from professional skating, he suggested that Jun should become a coach so he could still have an opportunity to skate in private. As a result, Jun has become even more skilled. Inspired, Tsukasa begins trying to copy Jun's moves and quickly learns them. Jun notices Tsukasa's talent and suggests he leverage it rather than waste it as a coach. However, Tsukasa maintains that he will fulfill his promise to make Inori an Olympic gold medalist. Jun then challenges Tsukasa to have Inori beat Hikaru in the All-Japans next month. Later, Tsukasa takes Inori to a special practice session reserved for those competing in the All-Japans. There, Inori and the other Novices witness the Junior level skater Iruka Okazaki practice her program and are both inspired and intimidated at the skill level they will be expected to perform at next year. Inori then reunites with Hikaru.
19	6	"Intensive Training"; Transliteration: "Kyōka Renshū" (Japanese: 強化練習)	Hideaki Ōba	Shinichi Watanabe	March 1, 2026
The skaters continue their practice session, but the other coaches note that Inori is the only skater that cannot perform the triple flip or triple Lutz jump, and assume that she spent all of her effort perfecting her program for the Chubu Block championship that she did not have time to practice it. Once the practice session is over, Inori is dismayed to learn Hikaru left early. She then meets Main Kobuta, who reveals she is a big fan of Mika as she served as the inspiration for her taking up figure skating. Iruka also reveals that she knows about Mika, and insinuates that Mika quit skating not because of her injury, but due to her lack of skill in jumps, which angers Inori. In order to prepare for the All-Japans, Tsukasa leverages Inori's status as a gold medal winner to recruit famous jump coach Kakeru Uobuchi to train her. Kakeru brings a special harness that helps suspend Inori in the air so she can get used to more complex jumps, which Tsukasa hopes will get her ready in time for the All-Japans.
20	7	"The Frozen Lake"; Transliteration: "Kōri no Mizūmi" (Japanese: 氷の湖)	Yasutaka Yamamoto	Shinichi Watanabe	March 8, 2026
Thanks to Uobuchi's training, Inori is quickly able to master the triple flip and triple Lutz in a single day. After Uobuchi takes his leave, Tsukasa decides to continue the training himself. However, while training Inori, his inexperience with using the harness causes him to fall on the ice and crack one of his ribs. Seeing Tsukasa get hurt emotionally disturbs Inori to the point where she regresses and can no longer complete her complex jumps. Concerned, Tsukasa arranges another meeting with Uobochi, though both he and Inori will have to travel overnight to Niigata to make the appointment. On the way to Niigata, they stop at Lake Suwa where Inori expresses her concern over Tsukasa's injury. Tsukasa insists that everything will work out somehow. As Tsukasa carries an exhausted Inori back to the car, Inori muses that since Tsukasa has a higher than normal body temperature, he must have been born to skate. This touches Tsukasa, as he had gone so long with nobody affirming he had a natural talent for skating, and swears that he will make Inori into the type of skater where everybody will have to acknowledge she was born to skate as well.
21	8	"Hot Passion"; Transliteration: "Nekketsu" (Japanese: 熱血)	Kōhei Kawai	Masashi Okumura	March 15, 2026
The next morning, Tsukasa and Inori arrive at Niigata and reunite with Uobochi. Reviewing Inori's recent jumps, he surmises that she is not tightening her body enough during her jumps. He takes the opportunity to both teach Inori how to correct her jumps as well as train Tsukasa in the proper use of the harness, and Inori is able to complete most of her jumps up to a double Lutz. As he observes Inori's progress, Uobochi then suggests that due to her mastery of the triple Salchow, Inori has the potential to perform a quadruple Salchow jump. However, given their limited training time, Inori is forced to choose to focus on mastering the triple Lutz or the quadruple Salchow and she decides on the latter. Despite many tries, Inori cannot land the jump due to her instinctual fear of getting injured like Mika. Seeing this, Tsukasa advises Inori not to stress herself about completing the jump, but instead focus on her surroundings. Thanks to the advice, Inori successfully completes the jump. Tsukasa then notices one his old acquaintances, fellow ice dancer Kohei Kamogawa, is watching.
22	9	"Opening"; Transliteration: "Kaimaku" (Japanese: 開幕)	Saori Yamamoto	Shinichi Watanabe	March 22, 2026
It is revealed that Kohei is the coach for Miku Ahiru, one of the novice skaters participating in the All-Japans. Miku asks Kohei whether she should practice for a quadruple toe loop like Uobochi suggested, but Kohei turns down the idea, deciding to focus on the jumps she already knows. While having lunch together, Kohei explaining to Tsukasa that besides Miku, he also helps train several young boys in Niigata, assisted by mutual friend and celebrity skater Juna Shiratori, who serves as Miku's choreographer. Kohei and Juna then both get into a debate on the best way to train Inori's quadruple jump, but recalling Jun's words, Tsukasa decides to train Inori his own way. Meanwhile, Miku reveals to Inori her plan to quit skating after the All-Japans due to the impending closure of the rink. Elsewhere, the other All-Japans novices prepare for the competition, including Ema, who competes in the Kinki Block Championship but places seventh while Suzu takes the gold. Hikari also works hard on her training. Inori practices her quadruple jump, but Jun had already predicted this and is confident Hikaru will still win. At the opening ceremony of the All-Japans, Inori and Hikaru reunite once again.

== Reception ==
The series ranked fifteenth on the "Nationwide Bookstore Employees' Recommended Comics of 2021" by the Honya Club website, and ranked twelfth on the 2022 edition. The series ranked sixteenth out of 50 nominees in the 2021 Next Manga Awards in the print category; it won the award in 2022. The series placed ninth in the 2021 Tsutaya Comic Award, and placed third in the 2022 edition. The series ranked 30th on the 2021 "Book of the Year" list by Da Vinci magazine; it ranked 23rd on the 2022 list; 27th on the 2023 list; 16th on the 2024 list; and seventh on the 2025 list.

The series won the 68th Shogakukan Manga Award in the general category in 2023. It was nominated for the 47th Kodansha Manga Award in the general category in 2023; it won in the same category for the 48th edition in 2024.
