= Nanami Yamashita =

Japanese voice actor

- 山下 七海
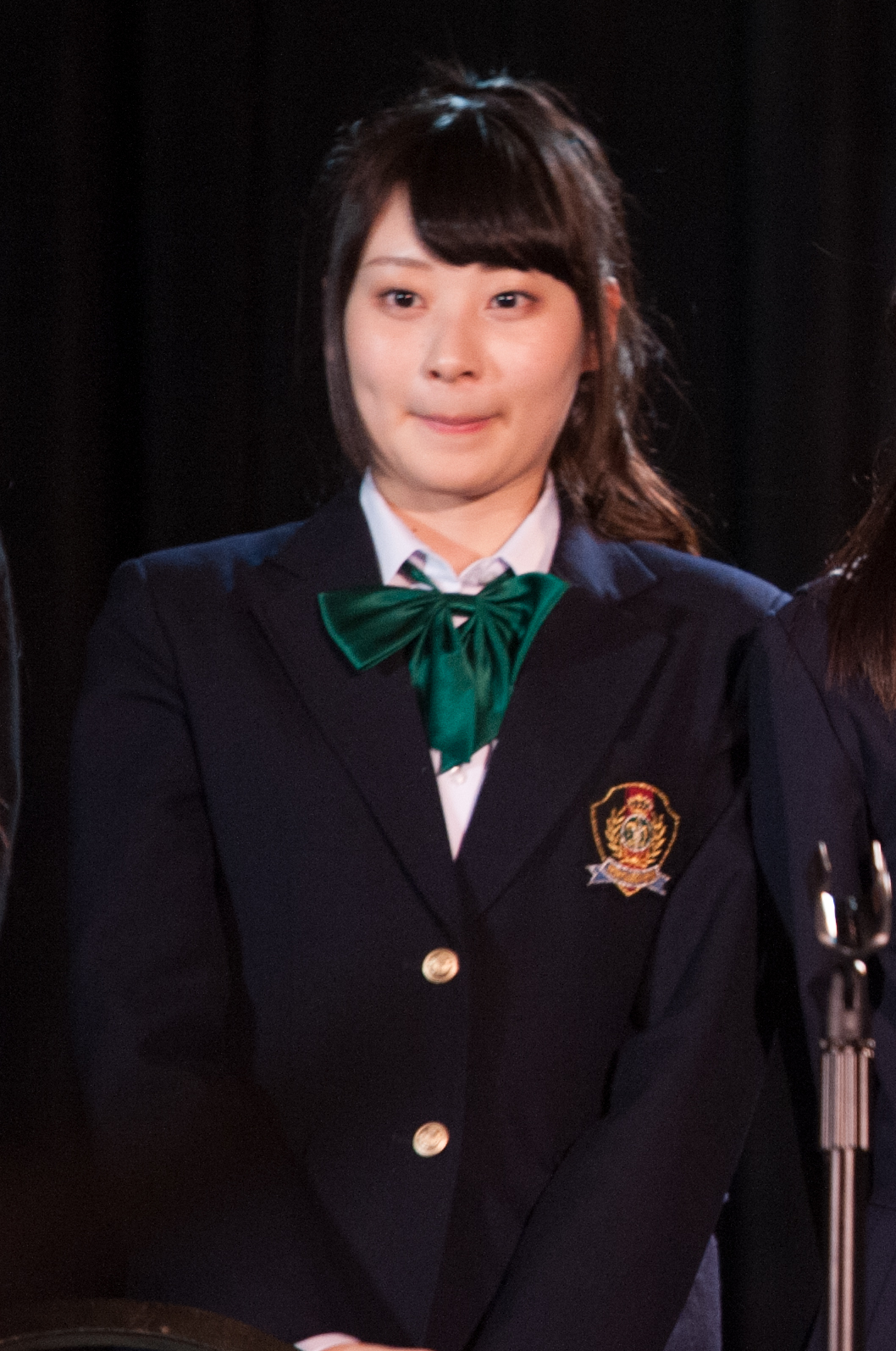
- Born: July 19, 1995 (age 31); Tokushima Prefecture, Japan
- Occupation: Voice actor
- Years active: 2013-present
- Agent: 81 Produce
- Notable work: The Idolmaster Cinderella Girls as Yui Ōtsuki; Wake Up, Girls! as Nanami Hisami; PriPara as Pepper Taiyō; Kiratto Pri Chan as KiracCHU

Nanami Yamashita (山下 七海, Yamashita Nanami; born July 19, 1995) is a Japanese voice actress from Tokushima Prefecture, Japan. She was a member of Wake Up, Girls!.

== Filmography ==
=== Anime ===
2014

- Wake Up, Girls! as Nanami Hisami
- Dramatical Murder as Female A (ep 5)
- Hanayamata as Student (eps 5–6)
- Re:_Hamatora as Child B (ep 8)
- When Supernatural Battles Became Commonplace as Chifuyu Himeki
- PriPara as Girl (ep 20)
- Trinity Seven as Master Liber
- Ohenro as Mao

2015

- The Idolmaster Cinderella Girls as Yui Ōtsuki (eps 10, 20, 22)
- Battle Spirits: Burning Soul as Kanna Kuroda
- Rin-Ne as Girl
- Hacka Doll The Animation as Hacka Doll #3
- Mr. Osomatsu as Nyaa Hashimoto, Woman (ep 13)

2016

- KonoSuba as Rookie Succubus (ep 9)
- High School Fleet as Tsugumi Yagi
- Hundred as Wendy Velvet
- Magi: Adventure of Sinbad as Girl B (ep 11)
- Puzzle & Dragons X as Garnet
- PriPara as Pepper Taiyō

2017

- Grimoire of Zero as Girl's younger brother (ep 4)
- Idol Time PriPara as Pepper Taiyō, Komugi Udongawa
- Wake Up, Girls! New Chapter as Nanami Hisami
- In Another World with My Smartphone as Sushie Ernea Ortlinde
- Mr. Osomatsu 2 as Nyaa Hashimoto
- Restaurant to Another World as Magician (ep 10)
- The Idolmaster Cinderella Girls Theater seasons 1 and 2 as Yui Ōtsuki (eps 13, 15)
- Sylvanian Families Mini Stories

2018

- Darling in the Franxx as Miku
- The Idolmaster Cinderella Girls Theater season 3 as Yui Ōtsuki (ep 9)
- Doraemon
- Bakumatsu
- Puzzle x Dragons as Honoka Himeno

2019

- The Idolmaster Cinderella Girls Theater Climax Season as Yui Ōtsuki (eps 5, 10)
- Cinderella Nine as Yoshimi Iwaki
- If It's for My Daughter, I'd Even Defeat a Demon Lord as Rudy's Sister (ep 6)
- Demon Slayer: Kimetsu no Yaiba as Kiyo Terauchi

2020

- 22/7 as Girl (ep 7)
- In/Spectre as Girl A (ep 11)
- Kiratto Pri Chan as KiracCHU
- Dropkick on My Devil! Dash as Kyon-Kyon
- GaruGaku as A.I Youka
- Mr. Osomatsu 3 as Nyaa Hashimoto, Girl (ep 25)
- A Certain Scientific Railgun T as Okawachi (ep 17)
- Grand Blues! as Sahli Lao (ep 5)

2021

- Demon Slayer: Kimetsu no Yaiba - Entertainment District Arc as Kiyo Terauchi
- Log Horizon: Destruction of the Round Table as Litka Mofur
- Pretty All Friends Selection
- Life Lessons with Uramichi Oniisan as Child (eps 1, 5–7)
- Love Live! Superstar!!
- Go! Go! Cook R'n as Komatsuzaka 8 Member
- Rick and Morty: ~SUMMER meets GOD~ (Rick meets Evil) as Future Being

2023

- TenPuru as Kurage Aoba
- In Another World with My Smartphone 2nd Season as Sushie Ernea Ortlinde

=== Theatrical anime ===
2014

- Wake Up, Girls! The Movie as Nanami Hisami

2015

- Wake Up, Girls! Seishun no Kage as Nanami Hisami

2017

- Trinity Seven: Eternal Library & Alchemic Girl as Master Liber

2018

- Eiga Shimajirō: Mahō no Shima no Daibōken as Pokapom
- Gekijōban PriPara: Minna de Kagayake! Kirarin Star Live! as Pepper Taiyō

2019

- Mr. Osomatsu: The Movie as Nyaa Hashimoto
- Trinity Seven: Heavens Library & Crimson Lord as Master Liber

2020

- High School Fleet: The Movie as Tsugumi Yagi

=== Original video animation ===
- High School Fleet as Tsumugi Yagi
- Yuuna and the Haunted Hot Springs as Miria Katsuragi (ep 4)

=== Web anime ===
2014

- Wake Up, Girls! ZOO as Nanami

2017

- Pac-Store as Pac-Marie

2020

- The Idolmaster Cinderella Girls Theater: Extra Stage as Yui Ōtsuki (ep 48)
- Idol Land PriPara as Pepper Taiyō

2025

- Yu-Gi-Oh! Card Game The Chronicles as Pittore

=== Video games ===
2013

- Wake Up Girls! Stage no Tenshi as Nanami Hisami

2014

- Hacka Dokka~n!! as Hacka Doll #3

2015

- The Idolmaster Cinderella Girls as Yui Ōtsuki
- The Idolmaster Cinderella Girls: Starlight Stage as Yui Ōtsuki
- Granblue Fantasy as Sahli Lao
- Thousand Memories as Hacka Doll #3
- School Fanfare as Ruri Mitsuno
- Miracle Girl Festival as Nanami Hisami
- Yurukami! as Konpira Uchiwa
- Yōkai Momohime-tan! as Hacka Doll #3
- Yome Collection as Mao, Hacka Doll #3
- Brave Sword × Blaze Soul as Or-drag, Gin-Iro

2016

- PriPara as Pepper Taiyō
- Aikatsu! as Hazuki Aranada
- Enkan no Pandemica code -S- as Chizuru Ryūzen
- Ore Tower -Over Legend Endless Tower- as Kihō-kan Suijungi
- Quiz RPG: The World of Mystic Wiz as Felch Lily, Floria Lily
- Gothic wa Mahō Otome ~Sassato Keiyaku Shinasai!~ as Hacka Doll #3
- Shutsugeki! Shiritsu Ebisu Chūgaku Busō Jajjimento-kai as Sachiko Hachino
- Soul Reverse Zero as Luce, Sibyl, Echo, Sei Shōnagon
- Dragon Genesis Seisen no Kizuna as Kushinada-Hime
- Trickster Online as Hacka Doll #3
- Venus Eleven Vivid! as Hacka Doll #3

2017

- Cinderella Nine as Yoshimi Iwaki
- Monmusu Harem as Kosui Aiba, Hacka Doll #3, Hacka Doll #3 Ver.CS
- Buki yo Saraba as Yuzu

2018

- Vampire†Blood as Renka Yakage
- Little Witch Academia: Chamber of Time as Balsa McVinegar
- PriPara: All Idol Perfect Stage! as Pepper Taiyō
- Vital Gear as Millefim, Elle
- Onsen Musume Yunohana Collection as Arisa Kinosaki
- Wake Up, Girls! Shinsei no Tenshi as Nanami Hisami
- Digimon Realize as Lopmon
- Tsukiakari -Luster- as Hyōma-shi, Tsukikage
- Megido 72 as Imp, Grimalkin
- Maplus+Kanojo as Kaori Yūki
- Death End Request as Alice
- Tokimeki Idol as Akane Tachikawa
- Crusader Attack as Anna, Automaton Orca
- Shiro Project:RE as Nihonmatsu Castle, Hitoyoshi Castle

2019

- 8 beat Story♪ as Ayame Tachibana (second voice)
- High School Fleet: Kantai Battle de Pinch! as Tsumugi Yagi
- MapleStory 2 as priest
- Caravan Stories as Akari
- Shirohime Quest as Heian Castle, Akita Castle
- Mistover as Grim Reaper
- Nijiiro Live as Rena
- Shachibato! President, It's Time for Battle! as Serena Turtim
- Touhou Cannonball

2020

- Final Fantasy Brave Exvius as Poppy
- Destiny Child as Serket
- Mitra Sphere as Mitra Pink, Cheerleader
- Shadowverse as Yui Ōtsuki, Shinobi Tanuki, Magical Shooter, Trinity Monsters
- Kiratto Pri Chan as KiracCHU
- Kōya no Kotobuki Hikōtai - Ōzora no Take Off Girls! as Nora
- Last Origin as Scissors Rize, T-10 Nymph, T-60 Bulgasari, Magical BaekTo
- Final Girl: Jūsō Senki as Sweetie
- TABE-O-JA as Belze
- Sakura Kakumei ~Hana Saku Otome-tachi~ as Shizuru Akiyoshi

2021

- Hyakka Ryōran: Passion World as Katakura Kojūrō
- Maglam Loaf as Ririka
- Tantei Bokumetsu as Literary Detective
- Waccha PriMagi! as Player voice (soft type)
- Demon Slayer: Kimetsu no Yaiba – The Hinokami Chronicles as Kiyo Terauchi

2022

- Ajin Ōjo to Ryūjin Eiyū: Mitra Sphere as Cheerleader
- KonoSuba: Fantastic Days as Lolisa
- Goddess of Victory: Nikke as Yulha

2024

- Blue Archive as Kirara Yozakura
- Fate/Grand Order as Kazuradrop

2025

- Cookie Run: Kingdom as Candy Apple Cookie
- Magical Girl Witch Trials as Hikami Meruru

=== Drama CD ===
2014

- Chanopu! Drama ~Yotsuba's Hobby Search feat. Meiko & Nanase Explosion Women's Conference!!~ as Namika

2016

- Idolmaster Cinderella Girls "Challenges to change" as Yui Ōtsuki

2017

- Idolmaster Cinderella Girls: Wild Wind Girl as Yui Ōtsuki
- Kujibiki Tokushō: Musō Harem-ken as Hikari

2018

- Kono Orokamono ni mo Kyakkō o! as Loli Succubus

2019

- In Another World With My Smartphone as Sushie Ernea Ortlinde

=== Audio drama ===
2016

- Rajidora! Yoru no Drama House: "Embarrassing and cuddly things"
- Karada Sagashi as Rumiko Hiiragi
- Byebye Jinrui as Yoriko Koguma

2018

- Cheat o Tsukureru no wa Ore Dake ~Munōryoku Dakedo Sekai Saikyō~ as Inori

=== Digital Comic ===
2019

- Kyōdai Nanka ja Iranai as Mahiru Suzukaze

2021

- Ao no Iris as Airi Nijigahara
- Genjitsu mo Tamani wa Uso wo Tsuku as Nanami Ōsaka

=== Audio Book ===
2015

- Shōsetsu-ban Wake Up, Girls! Sorezore no Sugata as Nanami Hisami

2020

- Strikefall as Adele Conte
- Mahō Shōjo-san da Ime ☆ as Mankai

2021

- Tsukumo no Sora Kasa as Ayano
- Ore to Kanojo no Koi o Chōnōryoku ga Jama Shite Iru. as Koharu Haijima
- Vampire Tantei -Kindan no Unmei no Chi- as Hikaru Torahime
- Sōchi no Bohimei as Hitsugi

2022

- Zenryaku, Koroshiya Café de Hataraku Koto ni Narimashita. as Fuyara

=== Dubbing ===
- Thomas and Friends : All Engines Go as Sandy

=== Live-action films ===
- Mr. Osomatsu: Project Slackers (2026)

== Discography ==
=== Character Songs ===
Release date	Title	Artist	Track listing
2014
October 8, 2014	Sen to Nihyaku no Monogatari	Team Ohenro	"Sen to Nihyaku no Monogatari" "Ohenro. Kazoe Uta ~Tokushima-hen~"
November 19, 2014	Overlappers	Qverktett:| |	"Overlappers"
November 19, 2014	Overlappers	Sakashita Otome.	"Inōsei Hakkengaku"
2015
January 30, 2015	"When Supernatural Battles Became Commonplace" Blu-Ray Volume 2 Bonus CD	Jurai Andō (Nobuhiko Okamoto), Chifuyu Himeki (Nanami Yamashita)	"Nobody knows, Oh yeah! -Sōsei-"
June, 2015		Ruri Mitsuno (Nanami Yamashita)	"Kienai Kesenai"
November 25, 2015	Touch Tap Baby	Hacka Doll	"Touch Tap Baby" "first heart beat"
November 25, 2015	Happy Days Refrain	Hacka Doll	"Happy Days Refrain" "Cabbage Kentei"
2016
March 2, 2016	The Idolmaster Cinderella Master 041 Yui Ōtsuki	Yui Ōtsuki (Nanami Yamashita)	"radio happy"
March 2, 2016	Hacka Doll: Hacka Song #3	Hacka Doll #3 (Nanami Yamashita)	"Hazy Lazy Doll"
March 30, 2016	The Idolmaster Cinderella Girls Starlight Master 01 Snow Wings	Uzuki Shimamura (Ayaka Ōhashi), Rin Shibuya (Ayaka Fukuhara), Mio Honda Sayuri Hara, Yui Ōtsuki (Nanami Yamashita), Haruna Kamijō (Mina Nagashima)	"Snow Wings"
March 2, 2016	The Idolmaster Cinderella Master Passion jewelries! 003	Yuki Himekawa (Mako Morino), Nina Ichihara (Misaki Kuno), Sanae Katagiri (Azumi Waki), Yui Ōtsuki (Nanami Yamashita), Yumi Aiba (Juri Kimura)	"Kimi ni Ippai☆" "Near to You"
March 2, 2016	The Idolmaster Cinderella Master Passion jewelries! 003	Yui Ōtsuki (Nanami Yamashita)	"Star Lovelation" (Kerakera cover)
July 18, 2016		Garnet (Nanami Yamashita)	"New World"
August 29, 2016		Garnet (Nanami Yamashita)	"Miracle Collab"
September 2, 2016	The Idolmaster Cindrella Girls 4th Live TriCastle Story Starlight Castle Venue Original CD	Yui Ōtsuki (Nanami Yamashita)	"Snow Wings"
2017
February 1, 2017	The Idolmaster Cinderella Girls Starlight Master 08 Beyond the Starlight	Rika Jōgasaki (Nozomi Yamamoto), Chieri Ogata (Naomi Ōzora, Karen Hōjō (Mai Fuchigami), Mizuki Kawashima (Nao Tōyama), Yui Ōtsuki (Nanami Yamashita)	"Beyond the Starlight (Master Version)" "Beyond the Starlight (Game Version)"
February 8, 2017	The Idolmaster Cinderella Master Evermore	Yumi Aiba (Juri Kimura), Kyōko Igarashi (Atsumi Tanezaki), Nina Ichihara (Misaki Kuno), Shiki Ichinose (Kotomi Aihara), Yui Ōtsuki (Nanami Yamashita), Sanae Katagiri (Azumi Waki), Fumika Sagisawa (Mao Ichimichi), Momoka Sakurai Haruka Terui, Shūko Shiomi (Ru Thing), Arisu Tachibana (Amina Satō), Yuka Nakano (Shino Shimoji), Asuka Ninomiya (Shiki Aoki), Kanade Hayami (Yuko Iida), Yuki Himekawa (Mako Morino), Frederica Miyamoto (Asami Takano)	"Near to You"
February 8, 2017	The Idolmaster Cinderella Master Evermore	Ayaka Ōhashi, Ayaka Fukuhara, Sayuri Hara, Kotomi Aihara, Shiki Aoki, Ruriko Aoki, Yuko Iida, Hiromi Igarashi, Asaka Imai, Sumire Uesaka, Maaya Uchida, Chiyo Ousaki, Naomi Ōzora, Yuka Ōtsubo, Mayumi Kaneko, Yūki Kaneko, Juri Kimura, Tomoyo Kurosawa, Amina Satō, Shino Shimoji, Aya Suzaki, Eri Suzuki, Asami Takano, Natsumi Takamori, Rika Tachibana, Atsumi Tanezaki, Haruka Chisuga, Nao Tōyama, Mina Nagashima, Yuko Hara, Saori Hayami, Natsumi Haruse, Mai Fuchigami, Marie Miyake, Yui Makino, Eriko Matsui, Rei Matsuzaki, Tomo Muranaka, Mako Morino, Kiyono Yasuno, Nanami Yamashita, Nozomi Yamamoto, Haruka Yoshimura, Ru Thing, Azumi Waki	"Evermore (4th Live Mix)"
February 8, 2017	The Idolmaster Cinderella Girls Wild Wind Girl Special Edition Original CD Volume 2	Yui Ōtsuki (Nanami Yamashita)	"Snow Wings (Game Size)"
February 24, 2017	PriPara Song Collection 2nd Stage	NonSugar [Non Manaka (Minami Tanaka, Chiri Tsukigawa (Nichika Ōmori), Pepper Taiyō (Nanami Yamashita)]	"Sugarless×Friend"
April 19, 2017	Gekijōban PriPara Minna de Kagayake! Kirarin☆Star Live! Song Collection	PriPara☆All Idols [Laala Manaka (Himika Akaneya, Minami Mirei (Yū Serizawa), Sophie Hōjō (Miyu Kubota), Shion Tōdō (Saki Yamakita), Dorothy West (Azuki Shibuya), Leona West (Yuki Wakai), Aroma Kurosu (Yui Makino), Mikan Shiratama (Yui Watanabe), Galulu (Asami Shimoda), Non Manaka (Minami Tanaka, Chiri Tsukigawa (Nichika Ōmori), Pepper Taiyō (Nanami Yamashita), Fuwari Midorikaze (Azusa Satō), Falulu (Chinatsu Akasaki)]	"PriPara☆LaLan"
June 8, 2017	Idolmaster Cinderella Girls Wild Wind Girl Original CD Special Edition Volume 3	Rina Fujimoto (Mayumi Kaneko, Sanae Katagiri (Azumi Waki), Yui Ōtsuki (Nanami Yamashita)	"Kimi ni Ippai☆"
June 24, 2017	The Idolmaster Cinderella Girls 5thLIVE TOUR Serendipity Parade!!! Shizuoka/Makuhari/Fukuoka Venue Original CD	Yui Ōtsuki (Nanami Yamashita)	"Beyond the Starlight (M@ster Version)"
July 23, 2017	Game PriPara Music Collection vol.3	NonSugar [Non Manaka (Minami Tanaka, Chiri Tsukigawa (Nichika Ōmori), Pepper Taiyō (Nanami Yamashita)]	"Go! Go! PriPaLife"
July 23, 2017	Game PriPara Music Collection vol.3	Pepper Taiyō (Nanami Yamashita)	"Go! Go! PriPaLife"
August 20, 2017	The Idolmaster Cinderella Girls Master Seasons Summer!	Yui Ōtsuki (Nanami Yamashita), Chieri Ogata (Naomi Ōzora), Minami Nitta (Aya Suzaki)	"Gin no Iruka to Atsui Kaze"
August 20, 2017	In Another World with My Smartphone Characyer Song Vol.3 Sushie & Leen	Sushie Ernea Ortlinde (Nanami Yamashita)	Waku Waku ga Tomaranai! "Junjō Emotional (Sushie Version)"
August 20, 2017	In Another World with My Smartphone Characyer Song Vol.3 Sushie & Leen	Elze (Maaya Uchida), Linze (Yui Fukuo), Yae (Chinatsu Akasaki), Yumina (Marika Kouno), Sushie (Nanami Yamashita), Leen (Sumire Uesaka)	"Junjō Emotional (All Singing)"
August 20, 2017	PriPara☆Music Collection season.3	SoLaMi♡SMILE, Dressing Pafé, NonSugar, Tricolore, Gaarmageddon, UCCHARI BIG-BANGS	Kumikyoku Forever☆Friends ~Interlude~ "Memories Medley"; Kumikyoku Forever☆Friends ~Third Movement~ "My Friend, Dear Friend"; Kumikyoku Forever☆Friends ~Fourth Movement~ "We Are The Friends!"
November 1, 2017	Humming Days	petit corolla [Hanagi Ikaho (Himika Akaneya), Rikka Ureshino (Ari Ozawa), Arisa Kinosaki (Nanami Yamashita), Tsubaki Itō (Eri Suzuki)]	"Humming Days" "Petit Etoile"
December 29, 2017	Kono Ashi de Zutto Doko Made Datte Aruite Ikeru	Kaori Yūki (Nanami Yamashita)	"Kono Ashi de Zutto Doko Made Datte Aruite Ikeru"
2018
January 10, 2018	The Idolmaster Cinderella Girls Little Stars! Snow*Love	Nina Ichihara (Misaki Kuno), Shizuku Oikawa (Yuri Noguchi), Yui Ōtsuki (Nanami Yamashita), Aiko Takamori (Yūki Kaneko)	"Snow*Love"
January 10, 2018	The Idolmaster Cinderella Girls Little Stars! Snow*Love	Yui Ōtsuki (Nanami Yamashita)	"Snow*Love"
January 17, 2018	Dreaming-ing!!	Tokimeki Idol Project [Akiha Yūki (Natsumi Hioka), Minato Tsukishima (Minori Suzuki), Francesca Tanaka (Yū Wakui), Natsumi Kawaguchi (Natsumi Kawaida), Tsubasa Aoyama (Yoshino Aoyama), Koyukimura Sanada (Yurika Takagi), Nanana Katagiri (Eri Inagawa), Noriko Hibino (Saori Hinata), Misui Tachikawa (Honoka Inoue), Akane Tachikawa (Nanami Yamashita), Nonoka Kusakabe (Reina Kondō), Izumi Izumi (Akane Fujikawa), Misaki Himari (Azusa Iwakura), Rare Mita (Aki Kanada), Haruko Asagiri (Rika Hayase)]	"Dreaming-ing!!" "Tokimeki☆Mirai"
January 17, 2018	Dreaming-ing!!	Tokimeki Idol Project [Misui Tachikawa (Honoka Inoue), Akane Tachikawa (Nanami Yamashita)]	"Twin Memories W"
January 17, 2018	Dreaming-ing!!	Akane Tachikawa (Nanami Yamashita)	"Dreaming-ing!!" "Twin Memories W"
March 18, 2018	Darling in the Franxx Ending Song Collection vol.1	XX:me [Zero Two (Haruka Tomatsu), Ichigo (Kana Ichinose), Miku (Nanami Yamashita), Kokoro (Saori Hayami), Ikuno (Shizuka Ishigami)]	"Torikago" "Manatsu no Setsuna" "Beautiful World"
March 18, 2018	Darling in the Franxx Ending Song Collection vol.1	Miku (Nanami Yamashita)	"Torikago (TV Size ver)"
June 27, 2018	Darling in the Franxx Ending Song Collection vol.2	XX:me [Zero Two (Haruka Tomatsu), Ichigo (Kana Ichinose), Miku (Nanami Yamashita), Kokoro (Saori Hayami), Ikuno (Shizuka Ishigami)]	"escape" "Darling"
July 11, 2018	Kanchigai Summer Days	Tokimeki Idol Project [Akiha Yūki (Natsumi Hioka), Minato Tsukishima (Minori Suzuki), Francesca Tanaka (Yū Wakui), Natsumi Kawaguchi (Natsumi Kawaida), Tsubasa Aoyama (Yoshino Aoyama), Koyukimura Sanada (Yurika Takagi), Nanana Katagiri (Eri Inagawa), Noriko Hibino (Saori Hinata), Misui Tachikawa (Honoka Inoue), Akane Tachikawa (Nanami Yamashita), Nonoka Kusakabe (Reina Kondō), Izumi Izumi (Akane Fujikawa), Misaki Himari (Azusa Iwakura), Rare Mita (Aki Kanada), Haruko Asagiri (Rika Hayase)]	"Kanchigai Summer Days"
July 11, 2018	Kanchigai Summer Days	Tokimeki Idol Project [Tsubasa Aoyama (Nagisa Aoyama), Akane Ichikawa (Nanami Yamashita)]	"ray after rain"
October 31, 2018		Yui Ōtsuki (Nanami Yamashita)	"Onegai! Cinderella"
November 9, 2018	The Idolmaster Cinderella Girls 6th Live Merry-Go-Roundome!!! Master Seasons Summer! Solo Remix	Yui Ōtsuki (Nanami Yamashita)	"Gin no Iruka to Atsui Kaze"
2019
March 8, 2019	Idolmaster Cinderella Girls Wild Wind Girl Burning Road Original CD Special Edition Volume 6	Yui Ōtsuki (Nanami Yamashita), Yuka Nakano (Shino Shimoji)	"Ashita Mata Aeru Yo Ne"
April 6, 2019	Hajimari no Aizu	Clutch! [Aoi Asada (Rika Tachibana), Kana Tsukumo (Haruka Shiraishi), Yoshimi Waki (Nanami Yamashita), Maiko Kurashiki (Iori Saeki), Chikage Honjō (Maru Asahina), Shizuku Tsukahara (Noriko Shibasaki)]	"All For One★" "Revolution No9!"
May 15, 2019	Precious Notes	8/pLanet! [Hinata Sakuragi (Yū Shamoto), Suzune Minase (Satomi Amano), Tsuki Kagura (Misaki Yoshioka), Ayame Tachibana (Nanami Yamashita), Anri Himesaki (Wakana Kingyō), Yukina Hoshimiya (Azumi Waki), Hotaru Genji (Nanami Yoshimura), Mei (Miharu Sawada)]	"Precious Notes"
October 23, 2019	Idolmaster Cinderella Girls Starlight Master 33 Starry-Go-Round	Miku Maekawa (Natsumi Takamori), Yui Ōtsuki (Nanami Yamashita), Yuki Himekawa (Mako Morino), Asuka Ninomiya (Shiki Aoki), Anastasia (Sumire Uesaka)	"Starry-Go-Round (Master Version)"
November 20, 2019	Idolmaster Cinderella Girls Starlight Master For The Next! 03 Gossip Club	Yui Ōtsuki (Nanami Yamashita), Rina Fujimoto (Mayumi Kaneko), Mika Jōgasaki (Haruka Yoshimura)	"Gossip Club (Master Version)"
November 20, 2019	Idolmaster Cinderella Girls Starlight Master For The Next! 03 Gossip Club	Yui Ōtsuki (Nanami Yamashita)	"Gossip Club (Master Version)"
2020
July 15, 2020	Ban Meshi ♪ Furusato Grand Prix Round 1 ~Haru no Jin~	Cinderella (Nanami Yamashita)	"Sakasama ♥ Cinderella Parade"
September 16, 2020	The Idolmaster Cinderella Girls Starlight Master Gold Rush! 01 Go Just Go!	Yui Ōtsuki (Nanami Yamashita), Riamu Yumemi (Seena Hoshiki), Karen Hōjō (Mai Fuchigami), Shin Satō (Yumiri Hanamori), Shiki Ichinose (Kotomi Aihara), Kako Takafuji (Rana Morishita), Atsumi Munakata (Ayaka Fujimoto), Mizuki Kawashima (Nao Tōyama), Kyōko Igarashi (Atsumi Tanezaki)	"Go Just Go! (Master Version)"
September 16, 2020	The Idolmaster Cinderella Girls Starlight Master Gold Rush! 01 Go Just Go!	Yui Ōtsuki (Nanami Yamashita)	"Go Just Go! (Master Version)"
December 2, 2020	Kiratto Pri☆Chan♪ Song Collection ~From Rainbow Sky~	KiracCHU (Nanami Yamashita)	"Kiratto Pri Chan Land"
December 2, 2020	Kiratto Pri☆Chan♪ Song Collection ~From Melody Fantasy~	Go Go! Mascots [KiracCHU (Nanami Yamashita), Melpan (Nichika Ōmori), Rabbily (Minami Tanaka)	"A-B-C-D-Ii Ne ★ Dance"
December 2, 2020	Kiratto Pri☆Chan♪ Song Collection ~From Ocean Mermaid~	Go Go! Mascots [KiracCHU (Nanami Yamashita), Melpan (Nichika Ōmori), Rabbily (Minami Tanaka)	"Oyakusoku Sensation"
December 16, 2020	Max Charm Faces ~Kanojo wa Saikō♡♡!!!!!!~	Shuta Sueyoshi with Totoko (Aya Endō), ♡Nyaa (Nanami Yamashita) & Osomatsu Brothers	"Max Charm Faces ~Kanojo wa Saikō♡♡!!!!!!~" "Max Charm Faces ~Kanojo wa Saikō♡♡!!!!!!~ Scout Totoko" "Max Charm Faces ~Kanojo wa Saikō♡♡!!!!!!~ Scout Nyaa" "Max Charm Faces ~Kanojo wa Saikō♡♡!!!!!!~ Totoko Dis by Nyaa" "Max Charm Faces ~Kanojo wa Saikō♡♡!!!!!!~ Nyaa Dis by Totoko" "Max Charm Faces ~Kanojo wa Saikō♡♡!!!!!!~ Totoko vs Nyaa"
2021
February 17, 2021	Idolmaster Cinderella Girls Broadcast & Live Happy New Yell!!! Original CD	Yui Ōtsuki (Nanami Yamashita)	"Starry-Go-Round (Master Version)
February 24, 2021	Amazing Intelligence ~Kuzu wa Saikō!!!!!!!!!!!!!♡♡△△~	Omusubi (Kazutomo Yamamoto) with Osomatsu-san All Stars	"Amazing Intelligence ~Kuzu wa Saikō!!!!!!!!!!!!!♡♡△△~"
April 25, 2021	Yaketsuku Yell	Clutch!	"Enten Sensei Uta" "Hachigatsu no Evergreen"
August 18, 2021	Osomatsu-san Original Sound Track Album 3	Shuta Sueyoshi with Totoko (Aya Endō), ♡Nyaa (Nanami Yamashita) & Osomatsu Brothers	"Max Charm Faces ~Kanojo wa Saikō♡♡!!!!!!~ Smile Again"
August 18, 2021	Osomatsu-san Original Sound Track Album 3	Omusubi (Kazutomo Yamamoto) with Osomatsu-san All Stars	"Amazing Intelligence ~Kuzu wa Saikō!!!!!!!!!!!!!♡♡△△~ Type Final"
August 25, 2021	Tasting NonSugar	NonSugar	"Dai! Bom! Dai Bōkendai!!" "TA PI RO PE SA PA N NAH!" "Sanka Sanyō, Yumeiro Kabuki" "Non-Period" "Treasure♪ My*Land!!!" "Kawaii Nonsu'genic!!!"
