= Happy Kanako's Killer Life =

Japanese manga series

- First tankōbon volume cover

幸せカナコの殺し屋生活 (Shiawase Kanako no Koroshiya Seikatsu)
- Genre: Comedy
- Manga
- Written by: Toshiya Wakabayashi
- Published by: Seikaisha
- English publisher: NA: Seven Seas Entertainment
- Imprint: Seikaisha Comics
- Magazine: Saizensen
- Original run: April 26, 2019 – present
- Volumes: 9
- Television drama
- Directed by: Tsutomu Hanabusa
- Written by: Tsutomu Hanabusa; Ruriko Matsushima; Yūsuke Aose
- Original network: DMM TV
- Original run: February 28, 2025 – October 8, 2026
- Episodes: 11
- Anime television series
- Directed by: Shinji Takamatsu
- Written by: Shinji Takamatsu
- Studio: Drive
- Original run: April 2027 – scheduled

Happy Kanako's Killer Life (Japanese: 幸せカナコの殺し屋生活, Hepburn: Shiawase Kanako no Koroshiya Seikatsu) is a Japanese four-panel manga series written and illustrated by Toshiya Wakabayashi. It originally began publication as a webcomic published on the author's Pixiv account in October 2018. It later began serialization on Seikaisha's Twi4 Twitter account and Saizensen website in April 2019. A live-action television drama adaptation aired from February to March 2025, with a second season airing from September to October 2026. An anime television series adaptation produced by Drive is set to premiere in April 2027.

== Synopsis ==
Kanako, a former office worker at an advertising agency, decided to quit due to harassment from her boss. She found a new job, but upon interviewing, she discovered it was a company that hired assassins, which made her uneasy. However, she was captivated by the company's reputation and decided to join. As an entrance test, she was ordered to assassinate her former boss. Although she hesitated, thinking she could not kill someone, she soon succeeded in the assassination. Having passed the test, her life as an assassin began.

== Characters ==
Kanako Nishino (西野カナコ, Nishino Kanako)
Voiced by: Hana Tamegai
Portrayed by: Non
Sakurai (桜井)
Voiced by: Ryōta Suzuki
Portrayed by: Taisuke Fujigaya
Kazuo Takehara (竹原カズオ, Takehara Kazuo)
Portrayed by: Yūma Yamato
Ōmori (大森)
Portrayed by: Hirona Yamazaki
Kiyomi Yoshioka (吉岡キヨミ, Yoshioka Kiyomi)
Portrayed by: Yūka Sugai
Yakuza boss (ヤクザの組長, Yakuza no Kumichō)
Portrayed by: Shun Sugata
Kanako's Mother (カナコの母親, Kanako no Hahaoya)
Portrayed by: Tae Kimura
Assassin Company President (殺し屋会社の社長, Koroshi-ya Kaisha no Shachō)
Voiced by: Junichi Suwabe
Portrayed by: Atsuro Watabe

== Media ==
=== Manga ===
Written and illustrated by Toshiya Wakabayashi, Happy Kanako's Killer Life originally began publication as a webcomic on the author's Pixiv account on October 29, 2018. It later began serialization on Seikaisha's Twi4 Twitter account and Saizensen website on April 26, 2019. Its chapters have been compiled into nine tankōbon volumes as of May 2026. The series is licensed in English by Seven Seas Entertainment.

No.	Original release date	Original ISBN	North American release date	North American ISBN
1	May 12, 2019	978-4-06-515710-7	August 3, 2021	978-1-64827-798-6
Chapters 1–16; Bonus 1–4
2	October 26, 2019	978-4-06-517534-7	October 12, 2021	978-1-64505-960-8
Chapters 17–32; Bonus 5–8
3	April 13, 2020	978-4-06-519411-9	January 25, 2022	978-1-64827-377-3
Chapters 33–48; Bonus 9–12
4	October 12, 2020	978-4-06-521286-8	May 3, 2022	978-1-63858-223-6
Chapters 49–64; Bonus 13–16
5	April 30, 2021	978-4-06-523197-5	August 16, 2022	978-1-63858-560-2
Chapters 65–80; Bonus 17–20
6	November 8, 2021	978-4-06-525818-7	January 31, 2023	978-1-63858-891-7
Chapters 81–94; Bonus 21–22
7	March 8, 2023	978-4-06-527760-7	April 30, 2024	978-1-68579-566-5
Chapters 95–110; Bonus 23–26
8	October 1, 2025	978-4-06-540400-3	July 28, 2026	979-8-89373-306-8
Chapters 111–126; Bonus 27–29
9	May 27, 2026	978-4-06-543400-0	—	—

=== Drama ===
A live-action television drama adaptation was announced on May 7, 2024. The drama is directed by Tsutomu Hanabusa and stars Non and Taisuke Fujigaya in lead roles. It was streamed on DMM TV from February 28 to March 28, 2025, and ran for six episodes.

A second season was announced on July 10, 2026. The cast and staff are reprising their roles from the first season. It was streamed from September 17 to October 8, 2026, and ran for five episodes.

=== Anime ===
An anime television series adaptation was announced on October 17, 2026. It will be produced by Drive and directed by Shinji Takamatsu, with Takamatsu handling series composition and Yoshiyuki Ōkubo designing the characters and serving as chief animation director. The series is set to premiere in April 2027.

== Reception ==
The series was ranked fifteenth in Honya Club's Nationwide Bookstore Employees' Recommended Comics of 2020.

== See also ==
- Tsuredure Children, another manga series by Toshiya Wakabayashi
