= Makoto Koichi =

Japanese voice actress

- 小市 眞琴
- Born: February 17; Nagano Prefecture, Japan
- Occupation: Voice actress
- Years active: 2014–present
- Agent: Tomorrow Jam
- Notable credits: The Legend of Heroes: Trails of Cold Steel – Northern War as Lavian Winslet; The Idolmaster Cinderella Girls U149 as Haru Yūki; WarioWare Gold as 9-Volt; Blue Archive as Renge Fuwa; Path to Nowhere as Tetra, Pepper, Joan
- Website: Official profile

Makoto Koichi (小市 眞琴, Koichi Makoto; born February 17) is a Japanese voice actress affiliated with Tomorrow Jam. Starting off as a stage performer, she began voice acting in numerous video games and anime, with her first main role being in the video game Toys Drive.

== Biography ==
Koichi was born in Nagano Prefecture and raised in Tokyo. She entered a high school with a theater department, where she gained experience performing on stage. Koichi was cast as Minami Iwasaki in a Lucky Star musical titled Lucky Star ≈ On Stage. She became interested in voice acting after watching the Lucky Star anime in order to study her character in the musical. In 2014, Koichi joined the voice acting agency Atomic Monkey, and voiced her first main character in the video game Toys Drive. In April 2021, Koichi left Atomic Monkey and moved to Stay Luck. In February 2023, she started hosting a radio program on Nippon Cultural Broadcasting's A&G block. In December 2024, Koichi moved to the talent agency Tomorrow Jam.

== Acting style and philosophy ==
Koichi has a background in theatrical acting, which she credits as a major influence on her voice acting performances. In a May 2026 interview, she noted that her stage experience allows her to better understand character blocking and emotional resonance even when behind a microphone. Known for voicing young male characters, Koichi explained that her approach focuses on adjusting her breathing patterns and vocal energy rather than just lowering her pitch. She emphasizes the importance of raw emotional delivery in action sequences, often physically engaging during recording sessions to capture the intensity of her roles.

== Filmography ==
=== Television animation ===
2016

- Nurse Witch Komugi R as Tsukasa Kisaragi
- Battle Spirits Double Drive as Shunta Mogami

2017

- Star-Myu as Female student, female clerk
- Aho-Girl as Akuru Akutsu (young)
- Time Bokan: The Villains' Strike Back as Gokabutton

2018

- Sanrio Boys as Seiichiro Minamoto (young)
- Hakumei and Mikochi as Sasanami
- Märchen Mädchen as Drew Verhoeven
- Layton Mystery Tanteisha: Katori no Nazotoki File as Andy (young)
- High School DxD Hero as Sairaorg (young)
- The Disastrous Life of Saiki K. as Okajima
- Seven Senses of the Reunion as Hiyane, young noble
- Gundam Build Divers as Ron
- Cells at Work! as Immature thymocyte
- Radiant as Mister Bobley
- Cardfight!! Vanguard as Battlefield Storm Sagramore, Naoki Ishida (young)
- The Girl in Twilight as Akio
- Million Arthur as Guyler (young)

2019

- The Price of Smiles as Yuni Vanquish
- W'z as Gai Kishiwada (young)
- My Roommate Is a Cat as Hayato Yasaka
- The Magnificent Kotobuki as Souya
- Demon Slayer: Kimetsu no Yaiba as Hand Demon's brother
- Star Twinkle PreCure as Yumika Nasu

2020

- Infinite Dendrogram as Rook Holmes
- Case File nº221: Kabukicho as Rampo
- Pet as Hiroki (young)
- Interspecies Reviewers as Elza
- Healin' Good Pretty Cure as Sumiko Nagara
- Mewkledreamy as Minako Hoshino
- Monster Girl Doctor as Glenn Litbeit (young)
- I'm Standing on a Million Lives as Yuka Tokitate
- By the Grace of the Gods as Kufo
- Sleepy Princess in the Demon Castle as Dawner the Hero (young)

2021

- Skate-Leading Stars as Kensei Maeshima (young)
- Horimiya as Kakeru Sengoku (young)
- Farewell, My Dear Cramer as Mao Tsukuda
- Night Head 2041 as Yūya Kuroki (young)
- The World's Finest Assassin Gets Reincarnated in Another World as an Aristocrat as Lugh (young)

2022

- World's End Harem as Reito Mizuhara (young)
- The Case Study of Vanitas as Jean-Jacques Chastel (young)
- In the Heart of Kunoichi Tsubaki as Aogiri
- Lycoris Recoil as Sakura Otome
- The Devil Is a Part-Timer!! as Satan Jacob (young)

2023

- Bungo Stray Dogs 4 as Teruko Ōkura
- The Legend of Heroes: Trails of Cold Steel – Northern War as Lavian Winslet
- Tomo-chan Is a Girl! as Junichiro Kubota (young)
- The Fire Hunter as Kaho
- Hell's Paradise: Jigokuraku as Nurugai
- Saint Cecilia and Pastor Lawrence as Eric
- The Idolmaster Cinderella Girls U149 as Haru Yūki
- Yuri Is My Job! as Sumika Tachibana
- Rurouni Kenshin as Myōjin Yahiko
- Undead Girl Murder Farce as Shizuku Hasei
- Berserk of Gluttony as Memil Vlerick
- Shangri-La Frontier as Oicazzo/Kei Uomi
- Undead Unluck as Ken
- Dead Mount Death Play as Palomy

2024

- Ishura as Lucelles
- I Was Reincarnated as the 7th Prince so I Can Take My Time Perfecting My Magical Ability as Lloyd
- Rinkai! as Kōme Hōfu
- Tower of God 2nd Season as Beniamino Cassano (young)
- No Longer Allowed in Another World as Nir

2025

- Aquarion: Myth of Emotions as Rimiya Tsukishiro
- Medalist as Riō Sonidori
- Milky Subway: The Galactic Limited Express as Kanata Iwao
- Dandadan as Jiji (young)
- April Showers Bring May Flowers as Keisuke Ueno
- Hell Teacher: Jigoku Sensei Nube as Tsuwabukimaru
- A Gatherer's Adventure in Isekai as Brolite
- May I Ask for One Final Thing? as Leonardo El Vandimion (young)

2026

- Hell Mode as Matthew
- Go for It, Nakamura! as Yuka Hamaoka
- Kusunoki's Garden of Gods as Utsugi
- The Cat and the Dragon as Prince
- I'm Looking for Zombies as Tōka
- Keroro☆ as Sergeant Keroro
- Vertex Force as Akira Todo

=== Original net animation (ONA) ===
2016

- Brotherhood: Final Fantasy XV as Marilith

2018

- B – The Beginning as Nasuka

2019

- Kengan Ashura as Tomoko Matsuda

2021

- The Missing 8 as Punkun

2022

- Shiyakusho as Rin Onoda

2024

- Time Patrol Bon as Heinrich Schliemann (young)

2025

- Lycoris Recoil: Friends Are Thieves of Time as Sakura Otome

=== Anime films ===
2019

- Seven Days War as Malet

2022

- The Seven Deadly Sins: Grudge of Edinburgh as Minika

2024

- Code Geass: Rozé of the Recapture as Ash (young)

2025

- Whoever Steals This Book as Hiroda

=== Video games ===
2014

- Toys Drive as Takuto Leonard

2015

- Ukiyo no Shishi as Ryōma Sakamoto
- Ukiyo no Rōshi as Yoshijirō Okita

2016

- Labyrinth of Refrain: Coven of Dusk as Fritz
- Pokémon Ga-Olé as Boy Player

2017

- Robot Girls Z Online as Raigarn

2018

- Monster Hunter: World as Receptionist
- The Idolmaster Cinderella Girls as Haru Yūki
- Higurashi no Naku Koro ni Hō as Mion Sonozaki (Hinamizawa Bus Stop)
- Princess Connect! Re:Dive as Kaya
- WarioWare Gold as 9-Volt, Kurina
- Girls' Frontline as F1, M1897

2019

- Samurai Shodown as Shizumaru Hisame

2020

- Caravan Stories as Hayami
- Dragon Quest X as Rascal

2021

- BlazBlue Alternative: Dark War as Akane Teruhiko

2022

- Path to Nowhere as Tetra, Pepper, Joan
- Neural Cloud as Jessie

2023

- Natsu-Mon: 20th Century Summer Kid as Satoru
- UsoNatsu: The Summer Romance Bloomed from a Lie as Kaoru Tachibana
- Blue Archive as Fuwa Renge

2024

- Azur Lane as Indiana

2025

- Silver and Blood as Nefertari Setti
- Mobile Suit Gundam U.C. Engage as Yuto Oldis

2026

- Fate/Grand Order as John Lackland

=== Dubbing ===
- The Time Traveler's Wife, Young Henry DeTamble (Jason David)
- Jellystone!, Augie Doggie
- Voltes V: Legacy: Super Electromagnetic Edition, Little Jon Armstrong (Raphael Landicho)
- Paw Patrol, Marshall
