= The Idolmaster Cinderella Girls U149 =

Japanese manga series by Kyowno

- Cover of the first manga volume

アイドルマスター シンデレラガールズ U149 (Aidorumasutā Shinderera Gāruzu U149)
- Genre: Idol, slice of life
- Created by: Bandai Namco Entertainment; Cygames
- Manga
- Written by: Kyowno
- Published by: Cygames; Shogakukan
- Imprint: Cycomi (2017–2019, 2023–present); Cycomi × Ura Sunday (2020–2023)
- Magazine: Cycomi
- Original run: October 15, 2016 – November 23, 2024
- Volumes: 17
- Anime television series
- Directed by: Manabu Okamoto
- Written by: Oki Murayama
- Music by: Makoto Miyazaki
- Studio: CygamesPictures
- Licensed by: Crunchyroll (streaming); SEA: Plus Media Networks Asia
- Original network: TV Tokyo, AT-X, BS11, BS NTV, TVQ
- Original run: April 6, 2023 – June 29, 2023
- Episodes: 12 + OVA
- icon

The Idolmaster Cinderella Girls U149 (アイドルマスター シンデレラガールズ U149, Aidorumasutā Shinderera Gāruzu U149; officially stylized as THE iDOLM@STER CINDERELLA GIRLS U149) is a Japanese spin-off manga series of The Idolmaster Cinderella Girls free-to-play simulation video game by Cygames and Bandai Namco Studios. The series is created by Kyowno, focusing on girls under 149 centimeters tall and 12-years-old or younger to be idols. An anime television series adaptation produced by CygamesPictures aired from April to June 2023.

== Plot ==
The president of a production agency decides to create a new idol unit titled the Third Entertainment Division to focus on the agency's younger idols who are still in elementary school. With the veteran producers reluctant to get involved with such an unconventional unit, a newly promoted producer is assigned to manage the division. With this unfamiliar situation thrust upon him, the producer decides to create a stage for his idols that nobody has seen before.

== Characters ==
Arisu Tachibana (橘ありす, Tachibana Arisu)
Voiced by: Amina Satō
One of the more mature idols of the group, 12-year-old Arisu is intelligent but distant, often preferring that others only call her by her family name. Due to her parents largely working for most of the day, Arisu has decided to become an idol and is willing to go to any length to achieve her dream.
Momoka Sakurai (櫻井桃華, Sakurai Momoka)
Voiced by: Haruka Terui
A very polite and well-mannered 12-year-old girl. She is wealthy, and excellent at acting. Her family owns the powerful Sakurai Group.
Miria Akagi (赤城みりあ, Akagi Miria)
Voiced by: Tomoyo Kurosawa
Miria is one of the friendliest and outgoing of the idols, and she dreams of being able to do a handshake meet and greet after she debuts. She is 11, and has a baby sister at home.
Risa Matoba (的場梨沙, Matoba Risa)
Voiced by: Hana Tamegai
An outspoken 12-year-old who is always keeping up with the latest fashion trends. She is very eager to debut as an idol and has great admiration and a close relationship with her father.
Haru Yūki (結城晴, Yūki Haru)
Voiced by: Makoto Koichi
A 12-year-old idol who is very athletic and talented at sports, particularly soccer. She is a tomboy who was forced to join the agency by her father in hopes that she would learn to act and dress more feminine.
Chie Sasaki (佐々木千枝, Sasaki Chie)
Voiced by: Asaka Imai
A well-mannered and mature but meek 11-year-old idol who is always glad to help others, but refrains from taking the spotlight herself due to her low self-confidence. She is also talented at sewing and fashion design.
Kaoru Ryūzaki (龍崎薫, Ryūzaki Kaoru)
Voiced by: Natsumi Haruse
A 9-year-old idol who is very energetic, happy, and outgoing. Since she often prepares meals for her family, Kaoru is a very skilled cook, but she hates green peppers.
Nina Ichihara (市原仁奈, Ichihara Nina)
Voiced by: Misaki Kuno
One of the younger idols of the group, 9-year-old Nina enjoys wearing animal kigurumi. It is revealed that this is a way for her to get attention, as her father is away overseas and her mother is too busy at work to pay much attention to her.
Koharu Koga (古賀小春, Koga Koharu)
Voiced by: Yuri Komori
A 12-year-old idol who has a love for animals and fairy tales. She keeps a pet iguana named Hyou-kun, and she dreams of to becoming a princess. She also has a tendency to get lost.
Producer (プロデューサー, Purodyūsā)
Voiced by: Yūki Yonai
The new producer of the Third Entertainment Division. He is short and is frequently mistaken for being younger than he is. While he initially believes he'd like to help produce for older and more mature idols, he soon sees the girls' underlying talent and motivation and decides to help lead them to the stage of their dreams.

== Media ==
=== Manga ===
The manga began serialization on October 15, 2016. On May 11, 2024, it was announced that the manga would be ending.

No.	Japanese release date	Japanese ISBN
1	July 28, 2017	978-4065092040
2	January 28, 2018	978-4065092453
3	May 30, 2018	978-4065118689
4	October 30, 2018	978-4065129432
5	May 30, 2019	978-4065163085
6	April 30, 2020	—
7	April 28, 2021	—
8	April 28, 2021	—
9	April 28, 2022	—
10	April 28, 2022	—
11	March 30, 2023	—
12	April 28, 2023	—
13	May 30, 2023	—
14	June 30, 2023	—
15	July 30, 2023	—
16	August 30, 2023	—
17	June 28, 2024	—
18	April 11, 2025	—
19	April 11, 2025	—

=== Anime ===
The anime adaptation was announced during the final concert in "The Idolmaster Cinderella Girls 10th Anniversary Magical Wonderland!!!" tour on April 3, 2022. It was directed by Manabu Okamoto, who was also the sound director, with Hiroyuki Takashima served as assistant director, Oki Murayama handled the scripts, Norie Igawa designed the characters for animation, Nippon Columbia produced the music, Makoto Miyazaki composed the music score and CygamesPictures animates the series. The opening theme song is "Shine In The Sky☆", performed by the titular in-story U149 idol unit.

The series aired from April 6 to June 29, 2023. An original video animation featuring two additional stories was bundled the release of the series' fourth Blu-ray. Crunchyroll streamed the series, while Plus Media Networks Asia broadcast the series in Southeast Asia.

No.	Title (Note: English titles for episodes 1 through to 12 are taken from Crunchyroll.)	Original release date
1	"When Can't You See Your Own Face in the Mirror?"; Transliteration: "Kagami Demo Miru Koto ga Dekinai Jibun no Kao tte, Nani?" (Japanese: 鏡でも見ることができない自分の顔って、なに?)	April 6, 2023
Young idol Arisu Tachibana is a member of a production agency, but is waiting to be assigned to a proper unit. She grows increasingly frustrated with how her parents are almost never home due to their long working hours. Meanwhile, the president of the agency pushes for the creation of the 3rd Entertainment Division, which will mainly star younger idols who are still in elementary school. The veteran producers are reluctant to get involved with such an unconventional unit, and instead assign a newly-promoted Producer to manage it. He arrives at the office and meets his idols, including Arisu, Kaoru Ryuzaki, Nina Ichihara, Mirai Akagi, Chie Sasaki, Risa Matoba, Haru Yuuki, Koharu Koga, and Momoka Sakurai. While Arisu initially has no confidence in the Producer, they bond over their mutual fascination with idols and the Producer promises to make a stage for his idols like nobody has seen before.
2	"What says 'I'm Home' even though it's leaving?" Transliteration: "Odekake Nano ni Tadaima o Suru Mono, Nani?" (Japanese: おでかけなのにただいまをするもの、なに?)	April 13, 2023
Nina arrives at the office with a collection of her kigurumi animal costumes, which she shows off to the others. The Producer then takes the idols to have promotional photos taken. However, Nina refuses to take her kigurumi off, due to feeling insecure without it. After practice, the idols return to the office while the Producer heads off to a meeting, though Nina accidentally leaves one of her kigurumi behind. The idols Shiki Ichinose and Frederica "Fred" Miyamoto find the kigurumi and decide to return it. Meanwhile, the Producer returns to the office where the idols are looking for the missing kigurumi. The Producer and Arisu accompany Nina through the city looking for it until Shiki and Fred catch up with them. Nina reveals she feels wearing kigurumi is the only way to get people to notice her due to her parents usually being away for work. The Producer assures her that it is her personality that attracts people, and promises to make her an idol so her father can listen to her no matter where in the world he is. The Producer later tells the other idols that he intends for all of them to debut as a group, and they take the opportunity to take a group photo.
3	"What Sinks in the Ocean and Doesn't Get Wet?"; Transliteration: "Umi ni Shizunde mo Nurenai Mono, Nani?" (Japanese: 海に沈んでもぬれないもの、なに?)	April 20, 2023
The Producer attempts to secure a venue for his idols to perform at, but everybody he meets is reluctant to host a unit consisting solely of elementary schoolers. Arisu and some of the other idols begin to become skeptical of the Producer's ability to secure work. When the Producer notices that Miria and a few other of the idols are big fans of the show Sugar-Min TV, hosted by idols Abe Nana and Shin Satou at the same agency, he has the idea to have his idols collaborate with Sugar-Min TV to gain some publicity. The idols film some segments with the hosts, but Shin accidentally turns on her livestream while showing her setup to Miria. Seeing how Miria is instantly popular with the stream audience, Shin plays along and continues the stream. Despite being chastised by his section chief, the Producer is ultimately proud of Miria finding the courage to livestream. Afterwards, thanks to the publicity from the videos, the 3rd Entertainment Division begins gaining more followers and securing job requests.
4	"What Flies With Broken Wings?"; Transliteration: "Hane ga Orete Iru no ni Tonde Iku Mono, Nani?" (Japanese: 羽が折れているのに飛んでいくもの、なに?)	April 27, 2023
Momoka is invited to star on a variety show where if contestants get a quiz answer wrong, they must go bungee jumping as a punishment game. While the Producer tells the other idols that Momoka, who has a refined and polite demeanor, was selected due to being the least likely to bungee jump, in reality she was chosen because her family's business, the Sakurai Group, sponsors the show. Suspicious of the Producer's motives, Arisu decides to accompany him and Momoka to the filming of the show. Arisu is shocked to learn that the entire show is scripted, and that Momoka is able to perform as a skilled actress as well. However, Momoka herself has doubts about how to act like a "normal person". When Momoka hesitates to bungee jump, the Producer offers to go first, and Momoka is reassured to know that even adults can show fear. She then performs the bungee jump with ease and is able to maintain her composure, which impresses her fans, and she tells the Producer she became an idol because she wants to spread her feelings of love to her audience. Some time later, the idols watch the finished episode and praise Momoka, while the group gains some new followers.
5	"What's Really High But Underground?"; Transliteration: "Sugoku Takai no ni Zutto Chika ni Aru Mono, Nani?" (Japanese: すごく高いのにずっと地下にあるもの、なに?)	May 4, 2023
Risa begins to get anxious when she sees Momoka's idol prospects advancing ahead of her own. She presses the Producer for some work, and he's able to find the opportunity for her to audition for the lead role in an upcoming movie. As Risa tries to improve her acting skills, the Producer provides her with an audition plan and, per her request, promises to reward her if she secures the role. While Risa is not chosen for the lead role, she is instead offered a supporting one, and accepts it. Despite this, Risa still blames herself for not being good enough, and fears she will let down her dad, whose attention she values greatly, to the extent she claims she wishes it were legal to marry him. Meanwhile, the Producer consults with his sister over how to help Risa, and decides on involving the other idols to help her prepare for her role. After filming is complete, Risa has the Producer invite all of the other idols to watch the film together.
6	"What Gets Cooler the Hotter it Gets?"; Transliteration: "Atsuku Nareba Naru Hodo Kakeru Mono, Nani?" (Japanese: 暑くなればなるほどかけるもの、なに?)	May 11, 2023
The Producer enlists Haru and Risa as replacement backup dancers for one of the agency's other idol groups, LiPPS. However, the assignment is on short notice, meaning the two have to learn the dance choreography before the weekend. During practice, they have a brief encounter with Shiki before the Producer arrives with the costumes. However, Haru is opposed to wearing cute or girly outfits, preferring tomboy-ish and cool clothes, and gets into an argument with Risa before storming off. The Producer goes after her, and she reveals to him that her father forced her to join the agency in an effort to make her dress and act more like a stereotypical girl. When Haru asks what the appeal of being an idol is, the Producer shows her a recording of a LiPPS concert. While inspired by the concert, Haru is still reluctant to wear a dress, so the Producer wears a skirt himself to put her at ease. She finally pushes through her discomfort and agrees to wear the outfit, though she is allowed to wear compression shorts underneath. Despite being nervous, Haru is able to perform her part in the concert, and becomes excited at the thought of becoming an idol, with Shiki challenging her to catch up to her level. The Producer then promises to Haru that she can perform at the girls' own concert next.
7	"What Speaks Without a Voice?"; Transliteration: "Koe o Motanai no ni Kataru Mono, Nani?" (Japanese: 声を持たないのに語るもの、なに?)	May 18, 2023
One day, Koharu decides to bring her pet iguana Hyou-kun to the office and show shim off to the other idols. She explains that she always used to get lost, but ever since she bought Hyou-kun as a pet, her parents always managed to find her quickly due to his distinct appearance, leading her to consider Hyou-kun her knight. That night, she makes a wish to spread her happiness to others, and the next day, the Producer tells her about a job offer to appear with Hyou-kun at an event that features rare animals. Koharu accepts the offer and tells the other idols that she became an idol in hopes of becoming a princess that everybody can love. After the huge success of the event, Koharu wanders off following a butterfly, forcing the Producer, Momoka, and Chie to scramble to look for her. Meanwhile, a rainstorm starts and Koharu takes shelter in a gazebo, only for Hyou-kun to seemingly abandon her, and she begins to reflect on what it means to be a princess. Hyou-kun finds the Producer and leads him to Koharu's location. On the way home, Koharu stops to help a lost child, and tells the Producer she's decided what kind of princess she wants to be, having realized that idols, just like princesses, want to make everyone happy.
8	"What Do You Put On To Be Beautiful?"; Transliteration: "Kirei ni Naru Tame ni Haku Mono, Nani?" (Japanese: 綺麗になるためにはくもの、なに?)	June 1, 2023
As the Producer tries to organize a concert for his idols, he encounters idol and teenage CEO Tsukasa Kiryuu, who is looking for models to star in a fashion show for her products. While the other idols are eager to participate, Chie shows a lack of self confidence. The Producer takes Chie, Miria, and Koharu to meet Tsukasa and the decide to help her organize all of the outfits, with Chie gaining an admiration for Tsukasa. Tsukasa notices Chie's potential and jokingly offers to poach Chie for herself. Unfortunately, after the work is completed, Tsukasa accidentally spills coffee on all of the prepared outfits. While Miria and Koharu suggest Chie can use her sewing skills to fix the damage, Chie balks due to her fear of failure. However, upon observing that adults like the Producer and Tsukasa can work despite their fear, Chie finds the courage to take charge. She uses her skills to create completely new outfits before the fashion show starts. During the fashion show, Chie works up the courage to go on stage, and the show proves to be a huge success. Afterwards, Tsukasa makes another offer to Chie, but she decides to say with the Third Division, and Tsukasa declares that she and Chie will be rivals the next time they meet.
9	"What Has Its Face Come Out When it's Warm?"; Transliteration: "Attakai to Kao ga Hokorobu Mono, Nani?" (Japanese: あったかいと顔がほころぶもの、なに?)	June 8, 2023
The Producer submits a request to hold a small concert for his idols. However, the veteran producers turn his request down, stating that they consider the Third Division idols to be idols in training. Under pressure trying to revise his request to be more acceptable, the Producer takes some inspiration from Kaoru and decides to take the idols on a field trip to the beach to relax. The idols spend the day doing various summer activities, with Kaoru even convincing Arisu, who normally doesn't like the summer heat, to participate. In the evening, the idols prepare their own pizzas for dinner, but Arisu accidentally spills too much sugar on hers, ruining it. Kaoru uses her cooking expertise to help fix Arisu's pizza, adding strawberries to neutralize the sugar. The Producer also helps Kaoru overcome her dislike for green peppers. That night, Arisu thanks Kaoru for showing her how to have fun during the summer. The next day, as the Producer and the idols return home, the Producer doesn't notice he's received a message directly from the President regarding the Third Division's new original song.
10	"What Color Gets Bigger the More You Bring It Together?"; Transliteration: "Kasanereba Kasaneru Hodo Ookiku Naru Iro tte, Nani?" (Japanese: 重ねれば重ねるほど大きくなる色って、なに?)	June 15, 2023
The idols begin to wonder when they will debut when the Producer informs them about their new original song. He once again petitions to his superiors for the chance to organize a concert, but they remain reluctant to provide their support, using the excuse that the agency is currently short on funds. The idols consult with Abe and Shin for advice, and they suggest that they save costs by using existing materials to create their own concert decorations. Arisu also comes up with the idea to stream the concert from the roof of the Third Division's office building. While the Producer agrees to fund the concert out of his own pocket, the idols make all the preparations such as practicing the new song, creating their own costumes, and enlisting the help of the agency's other idols. The streamed concert proves to be a huge success, and the President approves a full concert where the Third Division can officially debut. Despite the group's success, Arisu begins to feel isolated from her fellow idols as she wonders what her own motivation to be an idol is.
11	"What's the Difference Between Grown-Ups and Kids?"; Transliteration: "Otona to Kodomo no Chigai tte, Nani?" (Japanese: 大人と子供の違いって、なに?)	June 22, 2023
The Producer informs his idols that their group has now received an official name: U149, which references how all its members are currently less than 149 centimeters tall. While the rest of the idols are excited, Arisu is left conflicted about what her future as a idol would be, as well as the difference between a kid and an adult. The Producer begins meeting the idols' parents to discuss their idol debuts, and finally has the chance to meet Arisu's parents in person. However, they inform the Producer that Arisu never mentioned anything about her debut to them, and the other idols warn the Producer that Arisu has gone missing. Meanwhile, Arisu wanders the city lost in her own thoughts about how she can't be honest about her feelings. The Producer eventually finds Arisu on the office roof, where she admits she's afraid to talk about being an idol to her parents in fear that they will reject her dream. The Producer then breaks down cries at his inability to help Arisu, which helps her realize there's little difference between kids and adults. That night, Arisu tells her parents about her determination to become an idol and they decide to fully support her decision. The next day, Arisu decides to be more honest with both herself and the Producer.
12	"What can't be seen when it's bright out, but can be seen when it's nighttime?" Transliteration: "Akarui Toki wa Mienakute, Nemuru Toki ni Mieru Mono, Nani?" (Japanese: 明るい時は見えなくて、眠る時に見えるもの、なに?)	June 29, 2023
The agency plans to hold a major summer concert in three weeks, but U149 cannot participate due to child labor laws forbidding them from working beyond 8:00 pm. The idols are dismayed at this news, but the Producer tries to cheer them up by asking Arisu what she wishes to do as an idol. Arisu replies that she wants to be able to communicate her feelings with her songs, and the Producer and U149 help her come up with an original song. Meanwhile, the President decides to make a last minute change to the concert, moving up the concert time so that U149 can be included. Over the next three weeks, the entire agency works hard to prepare for the concert, with U149 practicing their new song. On the day of the concert, U149 are warmly greeted by the agency's other idols as well as the audience, and they perform their new song successfully. After the concert, the Producer promises to U149 that he will continue supporting them and make all of their dreams come true. The next day, the Producer introduces four new members to U149.
13a (OVA)	"What is it that you can't see but jumps and dances?" Transliteration: "Mienaikedo, Hane Tari Odottari Suru Mono, Nani?" (Japanese: 見えないけど、跳ねたりおどったりするもの、なに?)	Not Broadcast on TV, Blu-ray release October 25, 2023
13b (OVA)	"What is a flower that blooms when you talk?" Transliteration: "Oshaberi Suru to Saku Hana tte, Nani?" (Japanese: おしゃべりすると咲く花って、なに?)	Not Broadcast on TV, Blu-ray release October 25, 2023
