= Hana Tamegai =

Japanese voice actress and singer

- 集貝 はな
- Born: 20 September 1997 (age 29)
- Occupations: Voice actress; singer
- Years active: 2016–present
- Agent: Asleben
- Notable work: Kemono Michi: Rise Up as Misha; The Idolmaster Cinderella Girls as Risa Matoba; Studio Apartment, Good Lighting, Angel Included as Tsumugi Tsutsumi

Hana Tamegai (Japanese: 集貝 はな, Hepburn: Tamegai Hana; born 20 September 1997) is a Japanese voice actress and singer affiliated with Asleben. She is known for portraying Misha in Kemono Michi: Rise Up, Risa Matoba in The Idolmaster Cinderella Girls, and Tsumugi Tsutsumi in Studio Apartment, Good Lighting, Angel Included.

== Biography ==
Hana Tamegai, a native of Tokyo, was born on 20 September 1997. She decided to pursue a career in acting after, as an elementary school student, she spent time acting for a local children's theatre troupe. In 2014, while studying as a second-year high school student, she was one of the nineteen domestic winners of the voice acting category at the 3rd Seiyū Damashī contest. She was part of the Atomic Monkey/Voice Acting and Acting Institute's twelfth graduating class and joined Atomic Monkey.

She voices Risa Matoba in The Idolmaster Cinderella Girls, a sub-franchise in The Idolmaster franchise. Since then, she has performed as a singer on several Idolmaster music releases, including the 2020 single "The Idolmaster Cinderella Starlight Master for the Next! 08: Kagayake! Beat Shooter" (which charted at #4 in the Oricon Singles Chart) and the 2021 single "The Idolmaster Cinderella Girls Little Stars Extra: Kimi no Stage Ishō, Hontō wa..." (which charted at #7 in the Oricon Singles Chart). She reprised her role in the 2023 anime adaptation of The Idolmaster Cinderella Girls U149.

In September 2019, she was cast as Misha in Kemono Michi: Rise Up. In December 2023, she was cast as Tsumugi Tsutsumi in Studio Apartment, Good Lighting, Angel Included.

She left Atomic Monkey on July 31, 2025, and joined Asleben on August 1.

== Filmography ==
=== Animated television ===
2019

- Fight League: Gear Gadget Generators, Nakimushi Memorin
- Kemono Michi: Rise Up, Misha

2020

- Doraemon, pumpkin child
- Eternity: Shinya no Nurekoi Channel, Chihiro Nagoshi
- Hypnosis Mic: Division Rap Battle: Rhyme Anima, woman
- Interspecies Reviewers, Komoku
- Kaguya-sama: Love Is War, female student
- Toilet-Bound Hanako-kun, female student, children, etc.

2021

- I-Chu, spectator
- Idolish7 Third Beat, high school girl
- King's Raid: Successors of the Will, child
- The Dungeon of Black Company, club onē-chan
- Wave!!, young Yūta Matsukaze

2022

- Encouragement of Climb: Next Summit, classmate
- Lucifer and the Biscuit Hammer, young Tarou Kusakabe
- Shadowverse Flame, Shion Otosaka, Meity

2023

- The Idolmaster Cinderella Girls U149, Risa Matoba

2024

- Studio Apartment, Good Lighting, Angel Included, Tsumugi Tsutsumi
- Shinkalion: Change the World, Bina

2025

- Bogus Skill "Fruitmaster", Monica
- Teogonia, Alue

2026

- The Oblivious Saint Can't Contain Her Power, Iris
- The 100 Girlfriends Who Really, Really, Really, Really, Really Love You, Yamame Yasashiki

2027

- Happy Kanako's Killer Life, Kanako Nishino

=== Video games ===
2016

- Girls Reborn

2017

- Fight League
- Smash & Magic

2019

- Monster Strike, Ramiel, etc.
- The Idolmaster Cinderella Girls, Risa Matoba

2020

- Final Gear, Sura
- Girls' Frontline, UKM-2000, OBR
- Honkai Impact 3rd, Sora

2021

- Artery Gear: Fusion, Katie

2022

- Assault Lily Last Bullet, Yuka Matsumura
- Shadowverse, Shion, Mystic Queen Meiti

=== Animated film ===
- Belle (2021)

=== Original net animation ===
2019

- The Idolmaster Cinderella Girls 8th Anniversary Special Project: Spin-off!, Risa Matoba

=== Stage ===
2022

- Mother 4, Tanaka

2023

- Assault Lily Irma Girls Art School, Tokuko Higashikuse
- Nikaidō Yū no Jikenbo: Aphrodite no Bara, Yū Nikaidō
- Nikaidō Yū no Jikenbo: Labyrinth no Meikyū, Yū Nikaidō
