= Amina Sato =

Japanese voice actress

- 佐藤 亜美菜
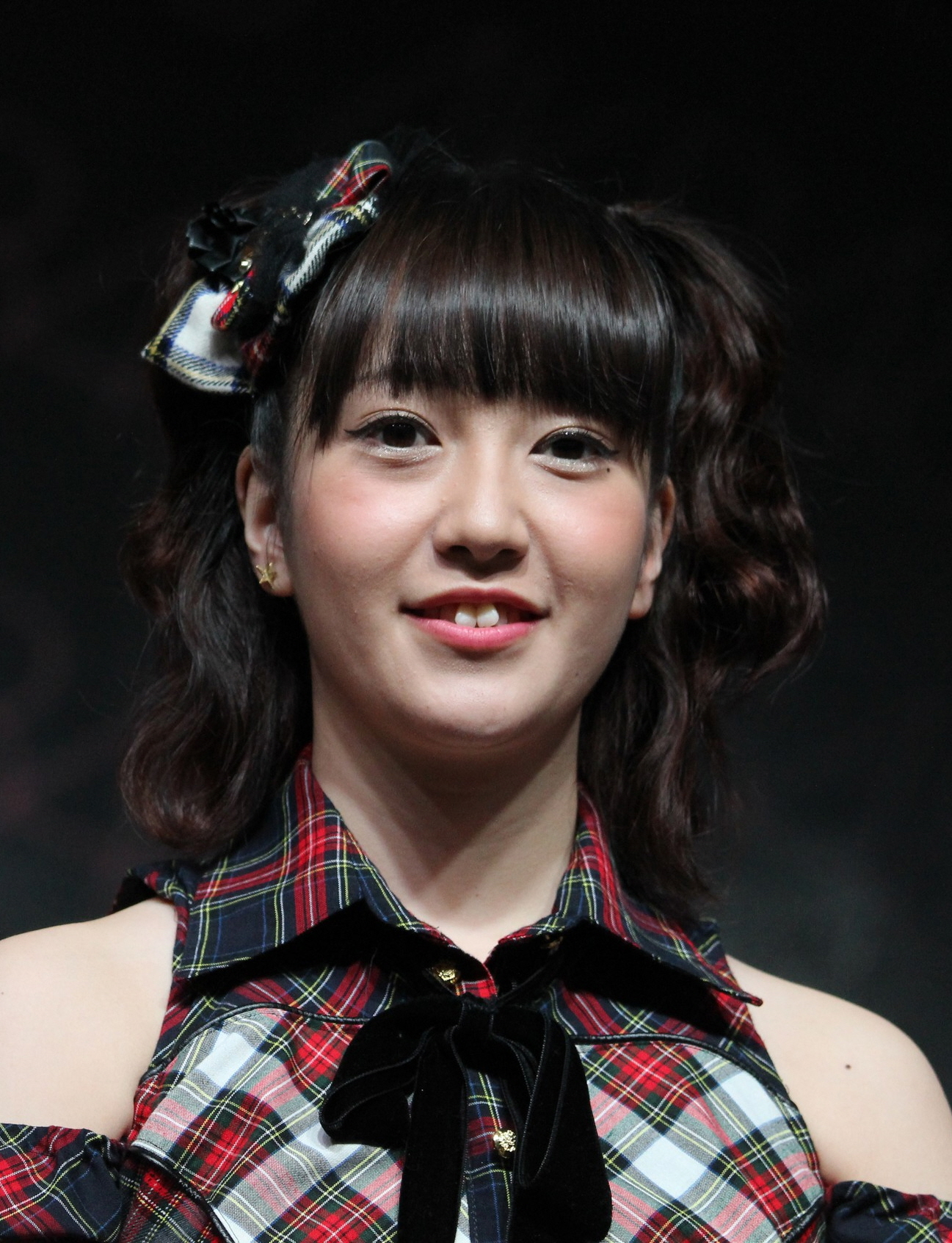
- Amina Sato in 2013
- Born: October 16, 1990 (age 35); Tokyo, Japan
- Occupations: Voice actor; narrator; radio personality
- Years active: 2008–present
- Agent: Office Osawa
- Musical career
- Genres: J-pop
- Instrument: Vocals
- Formerly of: AKB48; No Name

Amina Sato (佐藤 亜美菜, Satō Amina; born October 16, 1990 in Tokyo) is a Japanese voice actress and a former member of the Japanese idol girl group AKB48. In AKB48, she was originally a fourth generation trainee, then in Team A, in Team B, and finally in Team K. Amina Sato was also a member of a pop group named No Name, which consisted of several AKB48 members voice acting in the animation series AKB0048.

== Career ==
=== AKB48 ===
Sato joined the Japanese idol group AKB48 as a 4th generation trainee. In April 2008 she was promoted to Team A. In the first AKB48 general election in 2009, she placed eighth overall and was part of the group's A-side single, the historic Iiwake Maybe.

On August 23, 2009, at an AKB48 concert it was announced that in October she would be transferred from Team A to Team B. The transfer finally came into effect on May 21, 2010.

In summer 2010 she placed 18th in the second general election, earning a place on the A-side of AKB48's 17th single "Heavy Rotation". In the third general election in 2011, she placed 18th, winning a spot on the A-side for the single "Flying Get".

In December 2011 she passed an audition to voice act in AKB48's animated TV series AKB0048. Broadcast from April 2012, it featured her voice as one of the main characters Yūka Ichijō. She also participated in the two singles released by the associated pop unit No Name, composed of AKB48 members who were voice acting in the anime series. She reprised the role of Yuka in AKB0048's second season.

In 2012, she placed 21st in AKB48's fourth general election, and performed on the B-side track "Nante Bohemian" as part of Under Girls for the single "Gingham Check". In 2013, she placed 33rd on the fifth general election. The election rank made her the choreography center of the group Next Girls (formed of those who placed 33 to 48) which performed a B-side track for the single "Koi Suru Fortune Cookie".

On November 1, 2012, as part of a mass group shuffle announced on August 24 (on the first day of the AKB48 Tokyo Dome concert series), she was transferred from AKB48's Team B to Team K.

On December 22, 2013, at an AKB48 Team K's stage performance in Tokyo, Sato announced her graduation from AKB48. In her statement she expressed her intention to pursue her dream of becoming a voice actress. She graduated at a performance in the AKB48 Theater on January 15, 2014.

=== Post-AKB48 ===
In July 2016, Sato released a single as Arisu Tachibana, the character she voices in The Idolmaster anime series. The single reached number 8 on the Japanese Oricon Singles Chart.

In December 2016, it was announced that Sato would lend her voice to a new character that was being added to anime Girlish Number, a 17-year-old girl named Nanami Sakuragaoka.

In October 2021, Sato performed in the tenth anniversary live tour of THE IDOLM@STER CINDERELLA GIRLS as Arisu Tachibana. She sang three songs: to you for me, Hi-Fi☆ Days, and Shine!!

== Personal life ==
In 2019, Sato announced on Twitter that she had married a non-celebrity.

== Discography ==
=== Solo singles ===
Title	Release date	Charts
Title	Release date	JP Oricon
"The Idolmaster Cinderella Master 036 Tachibana Arisu" (THE IDOLM@STER CINDERELLA MASTER 036 橘ありす): as Arisu Tachibana (cv. Amina Sato)	November 30, 2015	8

=== Singles and other songs with AKB48 ===
==== Songs on AKB48 singles ====
===== A-sides =====
- "Iiwake Maybe"
- "Heavy Rotation"
- "Flying Get"

===== B-sides =====
- "Kimi no Koto ga Suki Dakara"
- "Nusumareta Kuchibiru"
- "Nakeru Basho"
- "Love Jump"
- "Area K"
- "Hito no Chikara"
- "Gondola Lift"
- "Yobisute Fantasy"
- "Hitsujikai no Tabi"
- "Mitsu no Namida"
- "Nante Bohemian"
- "Scrap & Build"
- "Yūhi Marie"
- "How Come?"
- "Kondo Koso Ecstasy"

==== Original songs on AKB48 albums ====
- "Ningyo no Vacances" (on the album Koko ni Ita Koto)

== Appearances ==
See 佐藤亜美菜#出演 in the Japanese Wikipedia.

=== TV dramas ===
- Majisuka Gakuen (2010)
- Sakura Kara no Tegami (2011)
- Majisuka Gakuen 2 (2011)

=== Stage plays ===
- Dump Show! (2011)
- SEMPO (ja) (musical, 2013)
- Papa no Tanjōbi (パパの誕生日) (original musical, on stage since 26 July 2014)

=== Radio shows ===
- AKB48 no All Night Nippon

=== Voice acting ===
==== Anime ====
- AKB0048 (2012) – Yūka Ichijō (main)
- AKB0048: Next Stage (2013) – Yūka Ichijō (main)
- Jewelpet: Magical Change – Nene (supporting)
- Morita-san wa Mukuchi – girl with glasses (supporting)
- Kids on the Slope – Mariko (supporting)
- The Idolmaster Cinderella Girls 2nd Season – Arisu Tachibana (supporting)
- The Idolmaster Cinderella Girls: Anytime, Anywhere with Cinderella – Arisu Tachibana (supporting)
- Triage X – Oriha Nashida (main)
- Triage X: Recollection XOXO – Oriha Nashida (supporting)
- Girlish Number – Nanami Sakuragaoka (supporting)
- Bermuda Triangle: Colorful Pastrale – Natura (supporting)
- Gekidol – Mayuri Nakamura (supporting)
- The Idolmaster Cinderella Girls U149 – Arisu Tachibana

==== Video games ====
- The Idolmaster Cinderella Girls – Arisu Tachibana
- Counter:Side – Lycoris

==== Dubbing ====
===== Live-action =====
- Clifford the Big Red Dog – Isabelle
- A Series of Unfortunate Events – Carmelita Spats

===== Animation =====
- Johnny Test - Mary Test
