= Yuuki Hirose =

Japanese actress

- 広瀬 ゆうき
- Born: 2 April 1993 (age 33)
- Occupations: Actress; singer
- Years active: 2008–present
- Agent: Aoni Production
- Notable work: Minami Kamakura High School Girls Cycling Club as Tomoe Akitsuki; Action Heroine Cheer Fruits as Mana Midorikawa; UQ Holder! as Kurōmaru Tokisaka; Hi Score Girl as Koharu Hidaka; WIXOSS Diva(A)Live as Mimi Usakawa
- Musical career
- Formerly of: AŌP

Yuuki Hirose (広瀬 ゆうき, Hirose Yūki; born 2 April 1993) is a Japanese actress and singer affiliated with Aoni Production. The daughter of actors Masasuke Hirose and Kiriko Shimizu, she had a brief acting career in the late-2000s and was an inaugural member of the idol group AŌP, remaining with them until their dissolution in 2021. After making her voice acting debut in 2014, she later starred as Tomoe Akitsuki in Minami Kamakura High School Girls Cycling Club, Noriko Yamada in Alice & Zoroku, Mana Midorikawa in Action Heroine Cheer Fruits, Kurōmaru Tokisaka in UQ Holder!, Koharu Hidaka in Hi Score Girl, Mimi Usakawa in WIXOSS Diva(A)Live, and Byleri in Chillin' in Another World with Level 2 Super Cheat Powers.

== Biography ==
Yuuki Hirose, a native of Tokyo, was born on 2 April 1993. She is the daughter of actors Masasuke Hirose and Kiriko Shimizu. As a young child, she watched her mother work as an actress, and she became interested in a voice acting career after seeing in a cast list that multiple characters were done by the same person. She then started an acting career and appeared in films and educational programming, but she downsized her appearances after graduating from high school.

When AŌP started holding auditions, Hirose's manager, who knew about her favorite anime, recommended the audition to her. She joined AŌP and was their only original member to remain with them by their dissolution in March 2021.

Hirose made her voice acting debut as Ferb Seto in the game Tokyo 7th Sisters. In February 2016, she won the Special Award at the 10th Seiyu Awards as a member of AŌP. In October 2016, it was announced that she would star as Tomoe Akitsuki in Minami Kamakura High School Girls Cycling Club, and she sang the anime's theme song "Jitensha ni Hana wa Mau" as part of AŌP. In 2017, she starred as Mana Midorikawa in Action Heroine Cheer Fruits, Noriko Yamada in Alice & Zoroku, and Kurōmaru Tokisaka in UQ Holder!. In 2018, she starred as Koharu Hidaka in Hi Score Girl, and in addition to singing the theme song as part of AŌP, she voiced Momomi Wareme in the 2018 anime Cutie Honey Universe.

Hirose left Sun Music Production to become a freelancer in October 2019 and joined Aoni Production as a junior in April 2020. Since then, she has starred as Mimi Usakawa in WIXOSS Diva(A)Live and Byleri in Chillin' in Another World with Level 2 Super Cheat Powers. In June 2022, she debuted as the bass guitarist of Lonesome Blue.

Hirose's hobby is playing the bass guitar. Her special skills include basketball and tongue twisters. She cites Houko Kuwashima and Mai Nakahara as two of her favorite voice actresses.

== Filmography ==
=== Animated television ===
Year	Title	Role	Ref.
2016	Time Travel Girl	Johanna	
2017	3-nin no Wakai On'na	Shinari Tōmaki	
2017	Action Heroine Cheer Fruits	Mana Midorikawa	
2017	Alice & Zoroku	Noriko Yamada	
2017	Minami Kamakura High School Girls Cycling Club	Tomoe Akitsuki	
2017	UQ Holder!	Kurōmaru Tokisaka	
2018	A Certain Magical Index	Sister	
2018	Cutie Honey Universe	Momomi Wareme, Tako	
2018	Hi Score Girl	Koharu Hidaka	
2019	Do You Love Your Mom and Her Two-Hit Multi-Target Attacks?	Torino	
2019	If It's for My Daughter, I'd Even Defeat a Demon Lord	Marcel	
2019	Outburst Dreamer Boys	Clark	
2020	A Certain Scientific Railgun T	Shokuho Clique Member	
2020	Assault Lily Bouquet	Misora Kanabako	
2020	By the Grace of the Gods	Welanna	
2020	Kaguya-sama: Love Is War	Female students	
2020	Mewkledreamy	Wakaba Midorino	
2020	One Piece	Townsperson, person	
2020	Tsugu Tsugumomo	Mana Manaka	
2021	Digimon Ghost Game	Nana, Candmon	
2021	That Time I Got Reincarnated as a Slime	Misery	
2021	WIXOSS Diva(A)Live	Mimi Usakawa	
2022	How a Realist Hero Rebuilt the Kingdom	Komain	
2022	In the Heart of Kunoichi Tsubaki	Tsuwabuki	
2022	In the Land of Leadale	Luine	
2022	Mobile Suit Gundam: The Witch from Mercury	Petra Itta	
2022	Police in a Pod	Saki	
2022	Requiem of the Rose King	Twin Prince Edward	
2022	Skeleton Knight in Another World	Prostitute	
2022	Sylvanian Families: Flare no Happy Diary	Stella, customer	
2022	The Demon Girl Next Door	Classmate	
2022	Tokyo Mew Mew New	Student, staff	
2022	Vazzrock the Animation	Child	
2023	Ayakashi Triangle	Woman	
2023	Kizuna no Allele	Friends	
2023	Is It Wrong to Try to Pick Up Girls in a Dungeon?	Iska Bra	
2024	Mission: Yozakura Family	Mocchi	
2024	Chillin' in Another World with Level 2 Super Cheat Powers	Byleri	
2024	Tsukimichi: Moonlit Fantasy	Luria Aensland	
2024	Murai in Love	Yayoi Fukunaga	
2025	From Old Country Bumpkin to Master Swordsman	Curuni Crueciel	
2026	Thunder 3	Suzuka Tashiro	

=== Animated film ===
Year	Title	Role	Ref.
2016	In This Corner of the World	Female students marching	
2021	Sailor Moon Eternal	Maenad	

=== Live-action film ===
Year	Title	Role	Ref.
2008	Kazoku Hiyori	Heroine	
2008	Sakura no Sono	Kumi Tachibana	
2009	Hokkomai Takamatsu Junjō Cinema	Chiaki	
2009	Three Count	Konatsu	

=== Video games ===
Year	Title	Role	Ref.
2014	Tokyo 7th Sisters	Ferb Seto	
2017	Tenka Hyakken: Zan	Tsuruga Masamune	
2018	Icchibanketsu Online	Fuguruma Youhi	
2020	White Cat Project	Cure Rhein Rouge	
2021	Assault Lily Last Bullet	Misora Kanabako	
2021	Brown Dust	Ava	
2023	Cinderella Nine	Aoi Mizuhara	
