= Yui Fukuo =

Japanese voice actress and basketball player (bprn 1994)

- 福緒 唯
- Born: 25 April 1994 (age 32); Hyōgo Prefecture
- Occupations: Voice actress; singer
- Years active: 2016–present
- Notable work: In Another World with My Smartphone as Linze Silhoueska; Minami Kamakura High School Girls Cycling Club as Yui Akitsuki
- Awards: Best New Actress Award at the 12th Seiyu Awards

Yui Fukuo (福緒 唯, Fukuo Yui; born 25 April 1994) is a Japanese voice actress and basketball player associated with 81 Produce. She is best known for voicing Linze Silhoueska in In Another World with My Smartphone and Yui Akitsuki in Minami Kamakura High School Girls Cycling Club and has won two Seiyu Awards.

== Biography ==
Yui Fukuo was born on 25 April 1994 in Hyōgo Prefecture. She was a member of AŌP when they won the Special Award at the 10th Seiyu Awards in 2016. On 28 February 2018, it was announced that she would graduate from the group due to her devotion to the voice acting industry.

In 2013, she received the Studio Deen Award at the 7th 81 Audition. She won her second Seiyu Award in 2018 when she was awarded the Best Rookie Actress award alongside Ayaka Nanase.

On 29 August 2018, she was announced as a member of the Seiyu Jr Basuke 3x3 SJ3.LEAGUE, described as the "first basketball league for voice actors", and played for the Cherubiacchi team.

In 2017, she voiced Linze Silhoueska in In Another World with My Smartphone and Yui Akitsuki in Minami Kamakura High School Girls Cycling Club.

== Filmography ==
=== Anime ===
2016

- ReLIFE, volleyball club kōhai
- Seisen Cerberus: Ryūkoku no Fatalite, Yupide
- Time Travel Girl, Rika Hayase

2017

- In Another World with My Smartphone, Linze Silhoueska
- Minami Kamakura High School Girls Cycling Club, Yui Akitsuki

2018

- Kiratto Pri Chan, Hokuto Imozaki

2019

- If It's for My Daughter, I'd Even Defeat a Demon Lord, Maya
- King of Prism: Shiny Seven Stars, audience

2020

- By the Grace of the Gods, Cilia

2023

- In Another World with My Smartphone 2nd Season, Linze Silhoueska

=== Film ===
2016

- Pop in Q, Nyaos

=== Video games ===
2019

- Hachigatsu no Cinderella Nine, Rin Reifa

2020

- Magia Record, Mouka Megumi

=== Radio ===
2018

- Yappari S ga Suki: Say You! Love Me!
