= Seena Hoshiki =

Japanese voice actor and singer

- 星希 成奏
- Born: October 11; Fukuoka Prefecture, Japan
- Occupations: Voice actor; singer
- Years active: 2018–present
- Agent: Aptepro
- Notable work: The Idolmaster Cinderella Girls as Riamu Yumemi; BATON=RELAY as Ririka Jingū; Vivid Army as Fūka

Seena Hoshiki (星希 成奏, Hoshiki Seena; born October 11) is a Japanese voice actress and singer from Fukuoka Prefecture, Japan. She was a member of the Japanese idol group AŌP from 2018 to 2021. Hoshiki took hiatus from voice acting from September 2022 to May 2023 due to acute lymphocytic leukemia.

== Early life ==
Seena Hoshiki was born on October 11 in Fukuoka Prefecture, Japan. She originally wanted to become a preschool teacher until she accompanied her friend for a singing audition during her first year in high school and passed auditions to join Sony Music Artists.

== Career ==
Hoshiki joined the Japanese idol group AOP Zero in 2017 until she was promoted to its sister group AŌP in March 2018. She remained in the group until its disbandment in March 2021. In September 2022, Sony Music Artists announced Hoshiki's hiatus from voice acting after she was diagnosed with acute lymphocytic leukemia, returning to work in May 2023 after her hospitalization ended.

== Filmography ==
=== Anime ===
2021

- Selection Project as Boy (ep 11)

2026

- Needy Girl Overdose as Nechika-sama
- Hanaori-san Still Wants to Fight in the Next Life as Mako Satsuki
- Smoking Behind the Supermarket with You as Yamada/Tayama

2027

- My Sword Saint Master Is Too Cute to Live With! as Eugene Dawson

=== Web anime ===
2020

- The Idolmaster Cinderella Girls Theater: Extra Stage as Riamu Yumemi

=== Video games ===
2018

- WAR OF BRAINS Re:Boot as Sayonaki, Polo

2019

- Brown Dust as Salvia
- The Idolmaster Cinderella Girls/Starlight Stage as Riamu Yumemi

2020

- BATON=RELAY as Ririka Jingū
- Vivid Army as Fūka

2021

- Shadowverse as Riamu Yumemi

2025

- Umamusume: Pretty Derby as Kiseki

=== TV shows ===
2021

- Koewaza no Eiyū (October 10th)

=== Stage Shows ===
2018

- Bakusou Adult Elementary School 5th Special Class "Bakusou Adult Elementary School. (October 17-21, Shinjukumura LIVE) as Penelope

2019

- Bakusou Adult Elementary School 10th All-School Assembly "Primary Education Royal" (May 29-June 2, Zenrosai Hall / Space Zero)-Mrs. Ito

2021

- Feather stage "THE END OF Commuter Express Daibakuha" (May 29-June 6, Theater KASSAI) as Mifune Eien (Team A)
- Wado no Ashura (December 10-12, Kyoto Theater) as Nene

=== Recitation Drama ===
2022

- Act Session vol.1 "Kishō Tenketsu"

=== Mixed Media ===
2014

- Onsen Musume (Yata Yamashiro)

== Discography ==
=== Character Songs ===
Release date	Title	Artist	Track listing
2019
October 16, 2019	Onsen Musume Complete Album Vol. 3	Yata Yamashiro (Seena Hoshiki)	Tokoshie no Shirube
2020
January 22, 2020	THE IDOLM@STER CINDERELLA MASTER Yume wo Nozoitara	THE IDOLM@STER CINDERELLA GIRLS!!	Yume wo Nozoitara
January 22, 2020	THE IDOLM@STER CINDERELLA MASTER Yume wo Nozoitara	THE IDOLM@STER CINDERELLA GIRLS for BEST5!	Sun! High! Gold!
April 22, 2020	THE IDOLM@STER CINDERELLA MASTER 057 Riamu Yumemi	Riamu Yumemi (Seena Hoshiki)	Otahen Anthem
June 17, 2020	Start me up/Kakedashi no Monologue	BATON=RELAY Project	Start me up Kakedashi no Monologue
June 17, 2020	Start me up/Kakedashi no Monologue	April4	Shigatsu no Dreams come true
June 17, 2020	Mirai=Baton	BATON=RELAY Project	Mirai=Baton
June 17, 2020	Mirai=Baton	April4	MAJI de MAGIA
September 16, 2020	THE IDOLM@STER CINDERELLA GIRLS STARLIGHT MASTER GOLD RUSH! 01 Go Just Go!	Riamu Yumemi (Seena Hoshiki), Yui Ōtsuki (Nanami Yamashita), Karen Hōjō (Mai Fuchigami), Shin Satō (Yumiri Hanamori), Shiki Ichinose (Kotomi Aihara), Kako Takafuji (Rana Morishita), Atsumi Munakata (Ayaka Fujimoto), Mizuki Kawashima (Nao Tōyama), Kyōko Igarashi (Atsumi Tanezaki)	Go Just Go!
September 16, 2020	THE IDOLM@STER CINDERELLA GIRLS STARLIGHT MASTER GOLD RUSH! 01 Go Just Go!	Riamu Yumemi (Seena Hoshiki)	Go Just Go! (Riamu Solo ver.)
January 22, 2020	THE IDOLM@STER CINDERELLA MASTER Yume wo Nozoitara	THE IDOLM@STER CINDERELLA GIRLS!!	Yume wo Nozoitara
2021
October 16, 2019	THE IDOLM@STER CINDERELLA GIRLS STARLIGHT MASTER GOLD RUSH! 13 Secret Mirage	Riamu Yumemi (Seena Hoshiki), Yukimi Sajō (Mina Nakazawa), Nana Abe (Marie Miyake)	Hare Hare Yukai
