= Cutie Honey Universe =

Japanese anime television series

- Teaser visual
- Type: Anime television series
- Genre: Adventure, magical girl, science fiction
- Based on: Cutie Honey by Go Nagai
- Directed by: Akitoshi Yokoyama
- Series composition: Natsuko Takahashi
- Character designers: Syūichi Iseki; Miyako Nishida (#10–12); Toshihide Matsudate (#10–12)
- Music by: Masato Nakayama
- Country of origin: Japan
- Original language: Japanese
- No. of episodes: 12

Production
- Art director: Satoshi Shibata
- Sound director: Tōru Nakano
- Cinematographer: Yujirō Yamane
- Color designer: Aki Watanabe
- CG director: Hiroaki Ohashi
- Editor: Hiromi Komine
- Studio: Production Reed
- Producers: Dick Ogehara; Hiromi Tsueda; Keiji Hamada; Kenichi Naitō; Kuninori Yoshizaki; Tomoko Yokoo; Yasuyuki Nishiya; Yutaka Kashiwagi
- Production companies: Dynamic Planning-Project CHU

Original release
- Networks: AT-X, Tokyo MX, BS11
- Release: April 8 – June 24, 2018

Cutie Honey Universe is a 2018 Japanese anime television series based on the Cutie Honey manga series by Go Nagai. Directed by Akitoshi Yokoyama at Production Reed (now Ashi Productions), written by Natsuko Takahashi, character designed by Syūichi Iseki and music composed by Masato Nakayama, Universe celebrates 50th anniversary of Go Nagai as a manga artist, and a fifth anime adaptation of the manga following 2004 original video animation, Re: Cutie Honey. Universe follows similar premise from its predecessors; Honey Kisaragi, a high school student who transforms into Cutie Honey, fights a villanous group called Panther Claw in order to seek avenge her father, Dr. Kisaragi's death. The series aired on AT-X and other networks between April 8 and June 24, 2018 and is licensed in North America by Sentai Filmworks.

== Plot ==
Honey Kisaragi is an android fitted with the Atmospheric Element Condenser (translated as the "Airborne Element Fixing Device" for the US release), which allows her to transform into the warrior of love, Cutie Honey, among other forms. When her father is killed by the evil Panther Claw organisation, Honey teams up with the PCIS (Panther Claw Criminal Investigative Services) to fight against them, unaware that its key investigator, Inspector Genet, is really Panther Claw's leader, Sister Jill.

== Characters ==
Honey Kisaragi (如月 ハニー, Kisaragi Hanī) / Cutie Honey (キューティーハニー, Kyūtī Hanī)
Voiced by: Maaya Sakamoto (Honey, Cutie Honey), Maaya Uchida (Hurricane Honey), Yukari Tamura (Misty Honey), Tomoyo Kurosawa (Flash Honey), Kana Hanazawa (Idol Honey), Suzuko Mimori (Fancy Honey) (Japanese); Jessica Calvello (English)
Like in the original manga, Honey is a superpowered android living as a young boarding school girl at the all-girls Saint Chapel Academy. Her powers come from an Atmospheric Element Condenser invented by her father, and it is this invention along with her innocence and good heart that makes her Sister Jill's target.
Next to her standard Cutie Honey incarnation, this version sports the following alter egos: the motor-racing Hurricane Honey, the fashion-oriented Fancy Honey, the tomboyish and camera-oriented Flash Honey, the music-oriented Misty Honey, and the cabin attendant-styled Idol Honey. Her love interest and current boyfriend is Seiji.
Sister Jill (シスタージル, Shisutā Jiru)
Voiced by: Atsuko Tanaka (Japanese); Marissa Lenti (English)
The leader of Panther Claw, who lusts for the Condenser hidden inside Honey's body and for her innocence, which she attempts to destroy, thereby corrupting Honey to evil. Her henchwomen are recruited from among young girls enarmored with her, whom Jill eventually transforms into her superpowered agents of evil. She uses white roses to inject them with a nanovirus, which turn blood-red when the transformation is completed. In order to get close to Honey, she poses as Inspector Genet (ジュネ, June), a mysterious police inspector from France who has been assigned to help PCIS in their pursuit of Panther Claw.
Natsuko Aki (秋 夏子, Aki Natsuko)
Voiced by: Yui Horie (Japanese); Bryn Apprill (English)
Honey's schoolmate and best friend. Initially only knowing about Honey's work for PCIS, she still suspected that Honey was not a normal person, but remains loyal to her. Unlike her manga version, she survives the Panther Claw assault on Saint Chapel in episode 6, and is subsequently entrusted by Honey with her full story. However, shortly afterwards she is captured by Jill and killed by Evil Tarantula Panther just before Honey can rescue her.
Tarantula Panther (タランチュラパンサー, Taranchura Pansā)
Voiced by: Rie Kugimiya (Japanese); Brittney Karbowski (English)
Sister Jill's aide de camp. She features several arachnoid characteristics, concluding an additional abdomen and the ability to create weblines which perform a number of functions, including changing the appearance of any person (including herself) enveloped by them. Originally one of the girls fervently devoted to Jill, she gradually becomes disillusioned as she continues witnessing her mistress' cruelty even towards her own devotees and Natsuko's deep love for Honey. When she senses her growing doubts, Jill splits Tarantula into a good and evil half. Good Tarantula atones for her role in Natsuko's death by aiding Honey in her final battle, in which she and her evil half slay each other.
Dragon Panther (ドラゴンパンサー, Doragon Pansā)
Voiced by: Chiaki Takahashi (Japanese); Morgan Berry (English)
One of Sister Jill's strongest fighters, she has the ability to form her legs and lower body into a dragon, complete with fire-breathing and flight abilities. Unlike most of her peers, she is more interested in a warrior's prowess rather than trying to win Jill's heart, and she is quite fond of Tarantula Panther. For these reasons, she sides with Honey against her former mistress during the final episodes arc, a choice for which she is killed by Sister Jill. This characterization is a complete reversal from her original manga version, where it was Dragon Panther who killed Natsuko and was subsequently slain by Jill for insubordination; a role which is filled by Snake Panther in the Universe series.
Seiji Hayami (早見 青児, Hayami Seiji)
Voiced by: Shintaro Asanuma (Japanese); Scott Gibbs (English)
In this series, Seiji is a member of PCIS, and an old acquaintance of Dr. Kisaragi. Whenever a case gets too difficult to handle for normal officers, he calls Honey to the scene. He is Honey's love interest and current boyfriend.
Danbei Hayami (早見 団兵衛, Hayami Danbei)
Voiced by: Kousei Tomita (Japanese); John Swasey (English)
Danbei is the father of Seiji and Junpei and a millionaire, slightly perverted but with a strong sense of justice.
Junpei Hayami (早見 順平, Hayami Junpei)
Voiced by: Yuka Terasaki (Japanese); Amber Lee Connors (English)
Seiji's younger brother and his father's constant sidekick who shares his pervertedness and has an attraction to older women, including Honey and Genet.
Kogoro Iboji (いぼ痔 小五郎, Iboji Kogorō)
Voiced by: Ippei Orishima (Japanese); Andrew Love (English)
One of Seiji Hayami's assistants in the PCIS, and a former private investigator.
Akebi Tetora (手寅 あけび, Tetora Akebi) and Momomi Wareme (我目 モモ実, Wareme Momomi)
Voiced by: Rui Tanabe (Akebi) and Yuuki Hirose (Momoni) (Japanese); Cat Thomas (Akebi) and Margaret McDonald (Momoni) (English)
A pair of young and cheeky female mecha users and intelligence operatives in the PCIS. While effective, they tend to disrespect their superiors and make fun at their incompetence at every opportunity.
Naoko Sukeban (直子, Naoko)
Voiced by: Romi Park (Japanese); Katelyn Barr (English)
The hulking, intimidating boss ("bancho") of a girl gang named the Sukeban at Saint Chapel Academy who act as an unofficial campus police force. Despite her rough looks and personality, she has a crush on Honey and is as a result quite jealous of Natsuko. During Panther Claw's assault on Saint Chapel, in revenge for the death of her entire gang and in order to protect Honey, she intercepts a deadly attack by Snake Panther and covers Honey and Natsuko's escape, apparently at the cost of her own life. However, thanks to her toughness she returns in the final episode to take the final fight to Sister Jill, and later joins Honey at their rebuilt school.
Principal Pochi's Wife
Voiced by: Ryo Naitou (Japanese); Andrew Love (English)
The wife of Saint Chapel's principal who is in a lesbian relationship with Alphonne. She is slain in her lover's arms when Panther Claw destroys Saint Chapel.
Alphonne (アルフォンヌ, Arufonnu)
Voiced by: Minoru Shiraishi (Japanese); David Wald (English)
Honey and Natsuko's homeroom teacher who is in a lesbian relationship with the principal's wife. She is slain in her lover's arms when Panther Claw destroys Saint Chapel.
Miharu Tsuneni (常似 ミハル, Tsuneni Miharu)
Voiced by: Yū Kobayashi (Japanese); Susan Koozin (English)
The sadistic superintendent of Saint Chapel whose cruel discipline, penchant for sadomasochism and habitual wielding of a whip have earned her the nickname "Hystler" ("Histora" in the US translation). Unaware of Honey's alter ego as a super heroine, she often ends up punishing Natsuko whenever Honey is called away on a mission against Panther Claw. Like most of the others, she is killed during Panther Claw's assault on Saint Chapel.
Dr. Takeshi Kisaragi (如月 武, Kisaragi Takeshi)
Voiced by: Katsuji Mori (Japanese); David Wald (English)
Honey's surrogate father, a scientist who copied the personality patterns of his dying daughter into her android form, into which he also integrated his invention, the Atmospheric Element Condenser. He was later killed by Panther Claw, who were after the device, shielding Honey from a fatal blow; it was also on that night that he taught Honey the secret of her powers. He was also the inventor of a gravity-based transportation device which is frequently used by Panther Claw for their attacks and escapes.

== Production ==
Cutie Honey Universe was first announced in December 2017 as part of creator Go Nagai's 50th anniversary as a manga artist. The anime is being directed by Akitoshi Yokoyama at Production Reed, with series composition by Natsuko Takahashi and character design and chief animation direction by Syuichi Iseki. The series premiered in Japan on April 8, 2018, on AT-X, Tokyo MX and BS11. Sentai Filmworks licensed the series and is simulcasting it in several countries outside of Japan on their Hidive service; they are scheduled to also publish a home video release of the series. The opening theme is "Ai ga Nakucha Tatakaenai" (愛がなくちゃ戦えない, You Can't Fight Without Love) by AŌP, while the ending theme is "Sister" by Luz.

| No. | Title | Original release date |
|---|---|---|
| 1 | "Everything About You Is Perfect"; Transliteration: "Anata no Subete wa Kanpeki" (Japanese: あなたの全ては完璧) | April 8, 2018 |
Honey Kisaragi is called in to help out at a hostage situation at a jewellery store involving the evil organisation Panther Claw, where she meets an inspector from France named Genet. Heading inside, Honey comes up against three of Panther Claw's emissaries, who are after the Atmospheric Element Condenser she possesses. Transforming into the soldier of love, Cutie Honey, Honey fights against Panther Claw, defeating one of its members before pursuing the other two as they escape towards a scrapyard, where Genet manages to kill another one. Honey soon comes up against Panther Claw's leader, Sister Jill, who overpowers her before escaping.
| 2 | "The True Joy of Having Met You"; Transliteration: "Anata ni Deaeta Koto no Kokoro Kara no Yorokobi" (Japanese: あなたに出会えた事の心からの喜び) | April 15, 2018 |
Honey explains to Genet about how her father Dr. Kisaragi gave her a life and a super android body before he was killed while defending her from Panther Claw. Following that incident, Honey teamed up with PCIS investigator Seiji Hayami in order to fight against Panther Claw and get revenge for her father. Meanwhile, Seiji ends up in hospital after his car is rigged to explode, which turns out to be a trap by the latest Panther Claw minion, Fire Claw, to lure out Honey, but she manages to quickly defeat her.
| 3 | "I Am Made For You"; Transliteration: "Watashi wa Anata ni Fusawashī" (Japanese: 私はあなたにふさわしい) | April 22, 2018 |
Honey's best friend, Natsuko Aki, becomes enamoured with Genet, who asks her out on a date and gifts her with a white rose. While Honey deals with another Panther Claw situation, Naoko Sukeban follows Genet and Natsuko to a department store. The store is suddenly attacked by another Panther Claw minion, Badfly Claw, who turns all the other customers into living mannequins. As Naoko and her gang get injured protecting Natsuko, Honey, realising the hostage situation was a decoy, rushes to the scene and defeats Badfly Claw. Following the incident, and with all of the Sukeban girls suddenly receiving white roses from an anonymous source, Natsuko begins to have her suspicions about Genet.
| 4 | "Pure Beauty"; Transliteration: "Muku no Utsukushi-sa" (Japanese: 無垢の美しさ) | April 29, 2018 |
Following a plan devised by Genet, Honey poses as an idol to lure out Panther Claw, only to get captured. However, when they attempt to dissect her body at their hideout, it turns out to be a fake created by the real Honey, who had beaten her captors and disguised herself as a Panther Puppet. Running low on energy, Honey is forced to disguise herself as a statue to evade the Panther minion Scissors Claw, only to find herself in trouble the next morning when Seiji's father and brother, Danbei and Junpei, take an obscene interest in her statue form. After Honey finally shoos them away and reunites with her team, it is revealed that Genet is secretly Jill, who is targeting Honey from within the PCIS team.
| 5 | "Till Death Do Us Part"; Transliteration: "Shinu made Kimochi wa Kawarimasen" (Japanese: 死ぬまで気持ちは変わりません) | May 6, 2018 |
Genet informs Honey and Seiji that their mayor, Noriko Terada, is secretly Panther minion Iron Shadow. Needing evidence to expose her, Honey transforms into a reporter to interview Terada, but doesn't get much useful information out of her. Following Genet's instruction, Honey, along with Seiji's family, follows Terada to an island resort, where she spots her trying to make an arms deal and exposes her. Iron Shadow then attacks with hostages that she had captured and turned into mannequins, preventing Honey from fighting back. However, Danbei manage to use his pervertedness to create a chance to cut off Iron Shadow's whip, severing her control over the hostages and allowing Honey to defeat her. Despite this setback, however, Jill prepares to enact the next stage of her plan to gain Honey for her own.
| 6 | "May Fortune Befall You"; Transliteration: "Anata no kōfuku o inoru" (Japanese: あなたの幸福を祈る) | May 13, 2018 |
One summer's day, a Panther Claw army led by Dragon Panther and Snake Panther launches a sudden airborne assault against Saint Chapel, as a part of Sister Jill's plan to drive Honey into despair and thus into her hands. With the school destroyed and their schoolmates slaughtered, Honey and Natsuko seek refuge in the woods, with their pursuers hot on their heels. Honey disguises Natsuko as a rock before taking the fight to Sister Jill herself, but ends up severely beaten. Natsuko bursts her camouflage and creates a diversion, allowing Honey to recover, and Naoko ends up blasted while covering Honey and Natsuko's escape from the island. Sister Jill slays Snake Panther for disobeying her orders to capture Honey alive; and for the death of her friends, Honey swears bitter revenge on Panther Claw.
| 7 | "Devotion to You Alone"; Transliteration: "Anata dake ni tsukushimasu" (Japanese: あなただけに尽くします) | May 20, 2018 |
Following their close escape, Honey and Natsuko (much to Danbei and Junpei's joy) find refuge with the Hayamis. Despite Honey putting up a cheerful air, Natsuko and Seiji are worried about how this terrible loss has really affected her, and wonder how they can help restore her spirits. Natsuko once more confronts Inspector Genet and later tells Honey, who went looking for her, about her suspicions; but as they return home, they find a bunch of Sister Jill's red roses there, which evoke a severe shock reaction from Honey as part of Jill's ploy to break her will. Deciding to fully confide in Natsuko, Honey tells her about her true nature, the Atmospheric Element Condenser, and how this invention has made her Panther Claw's target.
| 8 | "Vows of Love"; Transliteration: "Ai no chikai" (Japanese: 愛の誓い) | May 27, 2018 |
With her new-won knowledge of Honey's true nature, Natsuko is unsure how to cope with her worry about Honey's well-being. Tarantula Panther and her teammate Octopanther are assigned by Jill to kidnap Natsuko. To spring the trap, Tarantula makes contact with Natsuko; but when the latter pours out her heart to her, Tarantula, with her own unrequited feelings for Jill, begins to sympathize with Natsuko and advises her to tell Honey about her true feelings. Natsuko fails her chance at her next date with Honey, and is kidnapped by Jill during the following night. Whilst looking for her, Honey is ambushed by Octopanther, but unexpectedly aided by Tarantula Panther and is left with a new incentive to track down and defeat her nemesis.
| 9 | "The Whole World Is Just You and Me"; Transliteration: "Kono Sekai wa Futari Dake" (Japanese: この世界は二人だけ) | June 3, 2018 |
Jill sends PCIS a video message, threatening to kill a number of hostages - most of her remaining Panther minions and Natsuko - unless Honey surrenders herself and the Condenser. PCIS advises against giving in to Jill's demands and attempts to rescue the hostages themselves, but Jill's deviousness lets her kill off all her Panthers first, saving Natsuko for the end. When Honey arrives, Jill drops Natsuko off the roof of a high building. Tarantula Panther and Honey work together to save her; but Jill corrupts Tarantula, splitting her into a good and evil half. Before Honey can rescue her, Evil Tarantula kills Natsuko with Jill's sword, leaving Honey shattered.
| 10 | "Thank You for Your Compassion and Encouragement"; Transliteration: "Anata no Omoiyari, Hagemashi ni Kansha Shimasu" (Japanese: あなたの思いやり、励ましに感謝します) | June 10, 2018 |
Honey begins a merciless crusade against all Panther Claw activity across the city. With Natsuko's loss, however, she has begun to lose her former cheerfulness, distancing herself from her few remaining friends, just as Sister Jill (still posing as Genet) has planned. In her deteriorated state, Honey finds herself nearly out of power when she runs into Good Tarantula, who wishes to help her, and Dragon Panther, who aims to protect Tarantula. The battle is halted when Tarantula tells Honey about her awakened sympathy for Natsuko, and that she is therefore no longer Honey's enemy, and after a tense start Honey and the Hayamis take Tarantula Panther and Dragon Panther in. During a subsequent talk, Tarantula breaks down Honey's emotional barriers by turning herself into Natsuko. Deciding to fully go on the offensive, Honey turns to Genet for aid, still unaware that she is giving herself all the more to her nemesis.
| 11 | "You Will Be Mine to the Bitter End"; Transliteration: "Anata wa Akumade Watashi no Mono" (Japanese: あなたはあくまで私のもの) | June 17, 2018 |
Sister Jill keeps taunting Honey at every opportunity, fanning her hatred towards the murderer of all whom she has held dear. Jill challenges Honey to seek her out at her headquarters, Phantom Castle, and Honey decides to engage her nemesis without involving her few remaining friends. Tarantula Panther offers to accompany her, wishing to atone for her part in Natsuko's death, but Dragon Panther knocks her out and takes Honey to the castle herself. There, Genet finally reveals herself as Sister Jill, shattering Honey's resolve to fight until Dragon Panther intervenes on her behalf, and both prepare to charge Jill's monstrous amalgam of her Panther servants, Gill Panther, together. Meanwhile, while looking for Genet, Seiji stumbles into an interdimensional pocket containing frozen figures of Sister Jill's victims, including Natsuko, and thus discovers Jill's secret on his own.
| 12 | "You Will Return with Hope"; Transliteration: "Anata wa Kibō o Mochikaeru" (Japanese: あなたは希望を持ち帰る) | June 24, 2018 |
Jill kills Dragon Panther, and Honey ends up at the verge of defeat as well, when Tarantula, the Hayamis, Naoko and the whole of PCIS - all disguised as Cutie Honey lookalikes - intervene. Upon witnessing her friends' unshaking faith and their willingness to give everything they can for her, Honey recovers her fighting spirit, which the Atmospheric Element Condenser transfers to all her allies, uniting them all into a virtual army of Honeys. As the final fight rages between the Honey army and Panther Claw, Honey faces Sister Jill and, with the hearts of all her friends behind her, finally slays her nemesis. In the aftermath, Honey and Naoko return to their rebuilt school and Seiji and Honey become a couple.
