= Action Heroine Cheer Fruits =

2017 Japanese anime television series

- Poster

アクションヒロイン チアフルーツ (Akushon Hiroin Chia Furūtsu)
- Genre: Action
- Manga
- Written by: Azuse
- Published by: Akita Shoten
- Magazine: Young Champion Retsu
- Original run: June 20, 2017 – October 17, 2017
- Volumes: 1
- Anime television series
- Directed by: Keizō Kusakawa
- Produced by: Hitoshi Murakami; Shunichi Uemura; Gouta Aijima Soji Miyagi; Hiroyuki Sekigawa; Shōshin Ryū; Atsushi Yoshikawa; Seiichi Kawashima; Daigo Mizoguchi; Takaaki Nakanome; Tamaki Shiraishi
- Written by: Naruhisa Arakawa
- Music by: Hiromi Mizutani
- Studio: Diomedéa
- Licensed by: NA: Sentai Filmworks
- Original network: TBS, BS-TBS
- Original run: July 7, 2017 – September 29, 2017
- Episodes: 12

Action Heroine Cheer Fruits (Japanese: アクションヒロイン チアフルーツ, Hepburn: Akushon Hiroin Chia Furūtsu) is a Japanese anime produced by Diomedéa and directed by Keizō Kusakawa. The series aired in Japan between July 7 and September 29, 2017, and is licensed in North America by Sentai Filmworks. A manga adaptation by Azuse was serialized in Young Champion Retsu in 2017.

== Plot ==
Due to the popularity of a certain city's "action heroine", many districts across Japan have taken on their own local action heroines, holding various live action hero shows to promote their towns.

Misaki Shirogane, a high school girl and niece of the governor of Hinano City, is in heavy debt due to its dwindling popularity. After witnessing two of her fellow students, Ann Akagi and Mikan Kise, putting on an amateur hero show, Misaki enrolls them and other girls into the Action Heroine Project, in which they become local heroines and put on live shows to help revitalize their town.

== Characters ==
Misaki Shirogane (城ヶ根 御前, Shirogane Misaki)
Voiced by: Mao Ichimichi
The daughter of Hinano City's governor and student council president of her school. Wanting to help revitalize her town, Misaki heads up the Action Heroine Project to recruit heroines. She directs and hosts the Hina Nectar shows and occasionally shows up on stage in a white Hina Nectar uniform as Athena Platinum.
Ann Akagi (赤来 杏, Akagi An)
Voiced by: Miku Itō
An athletic high school girl who is a big fan of tokusatsu, in particular Kami Daioh, the Action Heroine of Kamiari City. It is her performance with Mikan that inspires Misaki to start up the Action Heroine Project. She plays Medica Red, the leader of the Hina Nectars.
Roko Kuroki (黒酒 路子, Kuroki Roko)
Voiced by: Rie Murakawa
The student council vice-president and Misaki's best friend. Her family operates Hinano's train station, providing the Cheer Fruits with a place to stage their performances. In the Hina Nectar shows, she plays the main villain Rokomo Black, and occasionally wears a black Hina Nectar uniform (such as when the girls perform the theme song).
Mikan Kise (黄瀬 美甘, Kise Mikan)
Voiced by: Erii Yamazaki
A shy girl who works hard for her little sister, Yuzuka. She asked Ann to perform a Kami Daioh show for Yuzuka, which was noticed by Misaki and lead to the formation of the Cheer Fruits. She writes the scripts for the Hina Nectar shows and plays Cheer Yellow, with Misaki occasionally giving her hosting duties in the hopes of building Mikan's confidence.
Mana Midorikawa (緑川末那, Midorikawa Mana)
Voiced by: Yuuki Hirose
A girl whose family runs Hinano's shrine. She often acts in a mercenary fashion, driving business to the shrine so she can have a larger allowance. She makes the costumes for the Hina Nectar shows and plays Terra Green.
Genki Aoyama (青山元気, Aoyama Genki)
Voiced by: Haruka Ishida
A paraplegic girl who is skilled with computers, including using audio software. She handles the special effects, sound mixing, and music composition for the stage shows. Promotional materials show her wearing a blue Hina Nectar uniform identical to her sister's.
Yūki Aoyama (青山勇気, Aoyama Yūki)
Voiced by: Haruka Ishida
Genki's twin sister, a former pop idol who quit after being pressured to exploit her sister's disability for sympathy. She has low self-esteem, sometimes descending into a "world of paranoia" (as Genki calls it) in which she believes people hate her even if they're actually being friendly and kind. After being convinced to join the Cheer Fruits, she leads the performance of the theme song and plays Sein Blue, who hails from Hinano's sister city of Cuernavaca, in the state of Morelos, in Mexico.
Hatsuri Momoi (桃井はつり, Momoi Hatsuri)
Voiced by: Moe Toyota
A young girl whose family operates a major construction firm in Hinano. She greatly admires Misaki, whom she refers to as "Lady Gozen" (a character from Ninpuu Sentai Hurricaneger). She manages the Cheer Fruits' practical effects (including pyrotechnics) and plays the Hina Nectars' fifth member, Nitro Pink.
Kanon Shimura (紫村果音, Shimura Kanon)
Voiced by: Haruka Shiraishi
A rich girl who considers Ann her arch-rival, stemming from their gymnastics competitions. However, Ann sees her as a friend rather than a rival, giving her by the embarrassing nickname "Muramura". Because of her athletic skill and rapport with Ann, she is cast as one of the villains in the Hina Nectars show known as Deep Purple and wears a purple Hina Nectar uniform during songs.

== Media ==
=== Manga ===
A manga adaptation by Azuse was serialized in Akita Shoten's Young Champion Retsu magazine from June 20 to October 17, 2017.

=== Anime ===
Action Heroine Cheer Fruits is directed by Keizō Kusakawa and produced by Diomedéa. The series aired in Japan between July 7 and September 29, 2017. The screenplay is written by Naruhisa Arakawa and character design is by Naomi Ide. The music is produced by Nippon Columbia. The opening theme is "Jōnetsu Fruits" (情熱☆フルーツ, Jōnetsu Furūtsu; Passionate Fruits) and the ending theme is "Hi no Ataru Basho" (陽の当たる場所, A Sunny Place), both performed by Tokimeki Kanshasai – a group composed of Mao Ichimichi, Rie Murakawa, Erii Yamazaki, Yuuki Hirose and Haruka Ishida). The opening theme for episode one is "Chō Tenkai Kami Daiō" (超天界カミダイオー, Ultra Heaven Kami Daiō) by Mai Fuchigami. Sentai Filmworks has licensed the anime and simulcast the series on Hidive.

No.	Title (Note: All English titles are taken from Hidive.)	Original release date
1	"Suddenly, the Heavenly Realm!" "Ikinari Chō Tenkai!" (Japanese: いきなり超天界！)	July 7, 2017
With the popularity of "action heroines", many districts have had local heroines of their own, complete with live action hero shows. In Hinano City, Mikan Kise takes her younger sister Yuzuka to a hero show of the most popular local heroine, Kamidaio, only to discover the show had been cancelled at the last minute. Not wanting to disappoint Yuzuka, Mikan asks Kamidaio fanatic Ann Akagi to help put on a Kamidaio show for her the next week. Thanks to their practise and choreography, the girls manage to make the show a hit with Yuutsu and her friends, but inadvertently knock over a tower in the process. The next day, after discovering their show had been uploaded online, the girls are summoned by student council president Misaki Shirogane, who asks them to become Hinano City's new action heroines.
2	"It's Okay for a Normal "Roko" to Try Being a Heroine" "Futsū no "Roko" ga Hiroin Yattemite mo Iin Dakedo" (Japanese: 普通の【ろこ】がヒロインやってみてもいいんだけど)	July 14, 2017
After recruiting both Ann and Mikan to join the project, Misaki, who is working to erase Hinano's debt within six months, puts up a poster for more applicants, attracting costume designer Mana Midorikawa and technician Genki Aoyama. Misaki's best friend, Roko Kuroki, is reluctant to ask Misaki to let her help as well. While the others work on an upgraded version of Ann and Mikan's "Kajudaio" show, Roko recalls the pain Misaki felt from losing a tennis championship and her grandfather, prompting Roko to put her feelings above her own. After learning that the train inspectors she admires so much do more than just work at night, Roko works up the courage to approach Misaki, who has her take Mikan's place as the show's villain. Just as their shows start to become a financial hit, the girls hit a snag when they are no longer able to use Mana's family shrine to hold their shows following complaints from parishioners.
3	"A Very Idle Kanon" "Dai Himajin Kanon" (Japanese: 大暇人カノン)	July 21, 2017
As the girls find themselves needing a new place to practise, they are approached by a rhythmic gymnast from another school named Kanon Shimura, who is baffled to find Ann had quit rhythmic gymnastics to watch tokusatsu series. Revealing she was the one who had the parishioners put pressure on the shrine, Kanon demands that Ann face her seriously in a race, saying she'll drop the pressure on the shrine only if Ann loses to her. Despite intending to lose, Ann gets fired up when Kanon unintentionally quotes Kamidaio's catchphrase and ends up winning the race instead. Luckily, the girls manage to make use of an abandoned train station where Roko lives and resume their show activities, managing to get a lot of attention from passing passengers. When one of the shows is about to be ended early due to the rain, Kanon shows up as an impromptu villain to encourage Ann to fight until the end. After the show, however, Misaki receive a cease-and-desist from Kamidaio's sponsors demanding a halt to the Kajudaio shows and merchandise sales due to its strong resemblance to Kamidaio.
4	"An Action Heroine Who Starts from Zero" "Zero kara Hajimeru Akushon Hiroin" (Japanese: ゼロから始めるアクションヒロイン)	July 28, 2017
Following Kamidaio's copyright claim, the girls are tasked with coming up with an original local heroine that shows off Hinano's appeal. As each girl presents their own ideas for a concept, Mikan proposes that they promote the city's fruits, deciding on the team name Cheer Fruits. Meanwhile, Genki learns that her sister Yuki, who has returned to Hinano after working as an idol, has yet to come to school. Using a scenario written by Mikan, the girls put on their first "Hina-Nectar" show, in which Ann, Mikan, and Mana fight as magical girl rangers against evil. Following middling reception from the adults over the small scale, the girls decide they need a singer to attract guests. Finding that none of the main heroines can sing very well, Genki takes the others to see Yuki as she sings in private.
5	"Project Blue" "Purojekuto Burū" (Japanese: ぷろじぇくと・ぶる～)	August 4, 2017
The girls approach Yuki about joining Cheer Fruits, but she gets scared off by her own paranoia over quitting the idol business. After Genki notices that Yuki quit being an idol as she did not want to use Genki's disability to further her own career, Yuki tries her hand at coaching the other girls in dance choreography. As the girls find themselves needing an original song, Genki presents a song she composed with Yuki, who teaches the girls a new choreography to go with it. Wanting to sing along with everyone, Yuki joins the others as the newest member of Hina-Nectar, helping them rise up the ranks.
6	"Explosion Angel Hatsuri-chan" "Bakuhatsu Tenshi Hatsuri-chan" (Japanese: 爆発天使はつりちゃん)	August 18, 2017
With the girls needing a pink heroine who is knowledgeable about special effects to further improve the shows, Misaki tells Roko about Hatsuri Momoi, a girl who seems perfect for the role but tends to go overboard with her appreciation for her. Agreeing to give her a chance, Misaki has Hatsuri give a test performance to prove herself. While Hatsuri's acting ability impresses, her excessive use of explosives lead her to fail the test. Not wanting to give up, Hatsuri tries being an apprentice instead, but her love of Misaki proves to be dangerous for the others. Reflecting on her actions, Hatsuri asks to take one more test, this time toning down her pyrotechnics to a more safe level. Although her handmade set collapses on itself, Hatsuri eventually passes the test and become an official member of Hina-Nectar.
7	"Good Luck!! Mikapyon" "Ganbare!! Mikapyon" (Japanese: がんばれ！！ミカピョン)	August 25, 2017
Struggling to write her next script while also wondering if she still has a place in Hina-Nectar, Mikan proposes a trip to the beach for a change of pace. However, during the train ride, a thunderstorm causes a tree to land on the track, leaving a carriage of kindergarten children frightened. Wanting to help them, Mikan puts on an improvised Hina-Nectar show to help calm the children until the storm passes. After the girls finally arrive at their beach house, the girls remind Mikan of her good qualities, helping her to overcome her writer's block and finish her script.
8	"Little Sis Aoyama Says She'll Start Directing" "Aoyama Imōto, Enshutsu Hajimerutte yo" (Japanese: 青山妹、演出はじめるってよ)	September 1, 2017
After putting on a surprise rehearsal for Misaki's birthday, they discover that another local heroine group has the exact same format they were planning. Needing to change things up to avoid another plagiarism incident, Genki comes up with some ideas for their next show, including wired stunts and making use of a fireworks festival taking place at the same time. Taking on the role of director, Genki takes on a spartan approach to try and help the others bring out their full potential as heroines. After the training, Misaki offers Genki the opportunity to take over as director, but she declines as she prefers being a stagehand.
9	"Silver Serious" "Gin no Maji" (Japanese: 白銀の本気～Silver Serious～)	September 8, 2017
As the girls get ready for their show, Mikan reveals she has written a part for Misaki to join in on the show, but she rejects. Recalling how she had also declined to do doubles tennis with her, Roko confronts Misaki, claiming she is just making excuses out of fear of her efforts being wasted. During the performance, the appearance of rain leads to the fireworks getting postponed by ten minutes, forcing the girls to think of a way to stretch out the show. When Roko trips up, Misaki decides to stop running away and appears on stage as an additional character, buying enough time for the girls to sync their finale with the fireworks.
10	"Goodbye, Hopeless Warrior" "Sayonara Zetsubō Senshi" (Japanese: さよなら絶望戦士)	September 15, 2017
With Cheer Fruits now in the top ten local heroine ranking, Mako Kamisu, the woman who plays Kamidaio, comes to Hinano to interview the girls, revealing herself to be a fan of their show too. As the girls become aware of the gap between them and Mako, their worries start to have a negative effect on their performances, pushing them out of the top ten and putting a strain on their friendship. Noticing everyone's funk, Mako shows the others that the town is still in full support of Cheer Fruits before revealing she has made new uniforms for everyone, although her true motives for motivating everyone are soon made clear.
11	"The Misery of Misaki Shirogane" "Misaki Shirogane no Yūutsu" (Japanese: 城ヶ根御前の憂鬱)	September 22, 2017
Back in the top ten, the girls are given the opportunity to perform at the Hinano Culture Center. In the run-up to the show, Mikan writes an expansive script, encouraging Misaki to once again appear as a performer. However, a few days before the performance, Misaki goes on a sudden break after she is contacted by her aunt. As the girls where she has disappeared to, they learn that the culture center is to be demolished earlier than scheduled after their performance. Confronting Misaki's aunt, the girls learn that the date the decision was made was on Misaki's birthday – the day her grandfather also died – adding to her misfortune. Despite this news, the girls remain determined to put on their best performance yet.
12	"Passion Fruits" "Jōnetsu Furūtsu" (Japanese: 情熱☆フルーツ)	September 29, 2017
While watching the show online, Misaki is surprised to see the girls sticking to the script that included her role. Just then, Mikan begins adlibbing, throwing in a plot element that reflects the turmoil Misaki is going through and their desire to support her. Misaki attempts to make her way over to the show, but ends up crashing her bike. Just as Misaki starts to feel all hopes are lost, she opens up the lucky charm that everyone gave her, filled with messages of support from all her friends. Inspired on by everyone's thoughts, Misaki pushes past her bad luck and joins everyone on stage, managing to make the show a success. With their shows continuing to be successful, increasing support for the center's demolition to be repealed, the girls prepare for a second season of Hina-Nectar.
