= Smoking Behind the Supermarket with You =

Japanese manga series by Jinushi

- First tankōbon volume cover, featuring Tayama (right) and Sasaki (left)

スーパーの裏でヤニ吸うふたり (Sūpā no Ura de Yani Sū Futari)
- Genre: Romantic comedy, slice of life
- Manga
- Written by: Jinushi
- Published by: Square Enix
- English publisher: NA: Square Enix Manga & Books
- Imprint: Big Gangan Comics
- Magazine: Monthly Big Gangan
- Original run: March 9, 2022 – present
- Volumes: 9
- Anime television series
- Directed by: Masato Suzuki; Aoi Mori
- Written by: Mio Inoue
- Music by: Shin Kono; Kōhei Yoshida
- Studio: Asahi Production
- Licensed by: Crunchyroll; Asia: Netflix
- Original network: JNN (TBS), AT-X
- Original run: July 10, 2026 – September 25, 2026
- Episodes: 12
- icon

Smoking Behind the Supermarket with You (Japanese: スーパーの裏でヤニ吸うふたり, Hepburn: Sūpā no Ura de Yani Sū Futari) is a Japanese manga series written and illustrated by Jinushi. It began as a webcomic published on Twitter in March 2022, before it was serialized in Square Enix's Monthly Big Gangan magazine in August 2022. An anime television series adaptation produced by Asahi Production aired from July to September 2026.

The manga won the 2022 Next Manga Award in the web category. The series has received largely positive reviews for Jinushi's writing and chemistry between the two main leads.

== Story ==
Sasaki, an overworked salaryman, finds a release of his daily tensions in the customer service of Yamada, a winsome, cheery supermarket cashier. One day he finds himself working late, and finding Yamada already done with work for the day, goes for a smoke, he finds a mysterious woman, "Tayama," who invites him to the smoking area behind the store. Yamada has a one-sided crush on Sasaki, and enjoys teasing him, though Sasaki remains completely oblivious of her feelings and of "Tayama" being her secret alter ego.

== Characters ==
Sasaki (佐々木)
Voiced by: Takuya Satō (Japanese); Giles Panton (English)
The male protagonist, a tired 45-year-old businessman working in sales at what Tayama describes as a "black company". He is often refreshed by visiting Yamada's checkout because of her friendly customer service and does not realize that his favorite cashier and his new smoking friend, Tayama, are the same person. He has very low self-esteem, constantly apologizing and trying to be considerate of everyone. As a result, despite respecting Yamada/Tayama, he doesn't want to pursue a relationship, holding both of them in extremely high regard, thus remaining completely oblivious to her feelings and show no signs of reciprocating whatsoever.
Yamada/Tayama (山田 / 田山)
Voiced by: Seena Hoshiki (Japanese); Caitlyn Bairstow (English)
The female protagonist; a 24-year-old employee of Super S who started as a part-timer eight years ago. As Yamada, she is demure and the perfect customer handler, while her true self—whom she introduces to Sasaki as "Tayama"—is much cooler, wearing a leather jacket and sporting several ear piercings. She invites Sasaki to the smoking area behind the store, which he then begins visiting regularly. She is both amused and slightly frustrated that Sasaki cannot tell Yamada and Tayama are the same person, and is also bothered by how he places Yamada on a pedestal while treating "Tayama" with extreme respect and consideration. She has a crush on Sasaki because of his kindness and acceptance of her true personality as Tayama, and she loves teasing him, though is often left frustrated of how he doesn't want to reciprocate. She is also unaware that Sasaki is the person who once helped her when she was still a part-timer.
Goto (後藤)
Voiced by: Toa Yukinari (Japanese); Rebecca Shoichet (English)
The manager of Super S, a supporter of Yamada (and what she observes of her relationship with Sasaki). Enjoys romance novels, and real-life approximations thereof. She's supportive of Yamada and Sasaki's relationship, although frustrated at the slow progress and Sasaki's unwillingness to reciprocate Yamada's feelings.
Sasaki's boss
Voiced by: (Japanese); Brian Dobson (English)
A bald man who repeatedly critiques and gives extra work to Sasaki as well as creates a harsh work environment for his employees.
Maezawa (前澤)
Voiced by: Yoko Hikasa (Japanese); Erin Mathews (English)
Another senior of Yamada's at Super S who is addressed as "Chief Maezawa" and is in charge of the cashiers. She recounts the story of a ghost in the store's smoking area to Yamada. She is good at helping out "lost" kids who need to find their parents.
Ohno (大野)
Voiced by: Megumi Toyoguchi (Japanese); Ruth Alexander (English)
An assistant manager at Super S who is approaching retirement age. She appears vague and mild-mannered, but is actually very opinionated.
Obata (小畑)
Voiced by: Rikuya Yasuda (Japanese); Cole Howard (English)
The head of the Produce Department at Super S. He is a tall, quiet, and reserved man.
Suzuki (鈴木)
Voiced by: Shinya Takahashi (Japanese); Andrew Francis (English)
Sasaki's sympathetic blond co-worker; father of Megumi.

== Production ==
At the time, Jinushi was serializing Rokurei — Tenseishi Rinne Kuyakusho Dairokkanbu Joreika Katsudouki in Monthly Big Gangan. Jinushi received advice from their editor to draw a short manga as an exercise in creative writing, which led them to creating the series. Since Rokurei was a supernatural story, the manga was drawn to be more realistic, and since the author had a background in customer service sales, the story was set in a supermarket.

== Media ==
=== Manga ===
When the first chapter was posted on Twitter, the tweet received more than 190,000 likes (as of June 2, 2022), creating a huge response. As of June 25th of that same year, the total number of likes for the series had surpassed 2.5 million.

On August 25, 2022, the serialization in the magazine began in Monthly Big Gangan. In this issue, it appeared on the cover and in the opening color. On the same day, the first volume of the book with newly written chapters was also released. As a result of this, the title was changed from Super no Ura de Yani Sū Hanashi (スーパーの裏でヤニ吸う話; "A Story About Smoking at the Back of the Supermarket") to Super no Ura de Yani Sū Futari (スーパーの裏でヤニ吸うふたり; "Behind the Supermarket, Smoking With You"), with chapters 4 to 16 that were posted on Twitter deleted, but announced that it will still continue on Twitter without change.

The manga is licensed by Square Enix's Manga UP! Global app and website. At Anime Expo 2023, Square Enix Manga & Books announced that they licensed the series for English publication, with the first volume being released on February 20, 2024.

==== Volumes ====
No.	Original release date	Original ISBN	English release date	English ISBN
1	August 25, 2022	978-4-7575-8094-7	February 20, 2024	978-1-64609-286-4
Smoke 1; Smoke 2; Smoke 3; Smoke 4; Smoke 5; Smoke 6; Smoke 7; Smoke 8; Smoke 9; Smoke 10; Smoke 11; Smoke 12; Smoke 13; Smoke 14; Smoke 15; Smoke 16; Smoke 0
2	January 25, 2023	978-4-7575-8362-7	May 21, 2024	978-1-64609-287-1
Smoke 21; Smoke 21 Interlude 1; Smoke 21 Interlude 2; Smoke 17 (Short); Smoke 18 (Short); Smoke 19 (Short); Smoke 20 (Short); Smoke 22; Smoke 22 Interlude 1; Smoke 22 Interlude 2; Smoke 23; Smoke 23 Interlude 1; Smoke 23 Interlude 2; Smoke 24; Winter, Behind the Bar, Not Quite with You
3	July 25, 2023	978-4-7575-8694-9; 978-4-7575-8695-6 (SE)	September 3, 2024	978-1-64609-305-2
Smoke 25; Smoke 25 Interlude 1; Smoke 25 Interlude 2; Smoke 26; Bonus Smoke: Waiting for that Day; Smoke 26 Interlude 1; Smoke 26 Interlude 2; Smoke 27; Smoke 27 Interlude 1; Smoke 27 Interlude 2; Smoke 28
4	January 25, 2024	978-4-7575-8709-0; 978-4-7575-8710-6 (SE)	March 18, 2025	978-1-64609-345-8
Smoke 29; Smoke 29 Interlude 1; Smoke 29 Interlude 2; Smoke 29 Interlude 3; Smoke 30; Bonus Smoke: The Inspirational Psychic; Smoke 30 Interlude; Smoke 31; Smoke 31 Interlude; Smoke 32; Smoke 33
5	July 25, 2024	978-4-7575-9314-5	August 12, 2025	978-1-64609-393-9
Smoke 34; Smoke 34 Interlude; Smoke 35; Smoke 35 Interlude; Smoke 36; Smoke 36 Interlude; Bonus Smoke: The Long Road to Friendship; Smoke 37; Smoke 38
6	January 24, 2025	978-4-7575-9542-2; 978-4-7575-9543-9 (SE)	January 20, 2026	978-1-64609-448-6
Smoke 39; Smoke 40; Smoke 41; Smoke 42; Bonus Smoke: Creeping Forward on Crab Legs; Smoke 43; Smoke 44
7	July 25, 2025	978-4-7575-9975-8	July 7, 2026	979-8-89910-002-4
Smoke 45; Smoke 46; Smoke 47; Smoke 48; Smoke 49; Smoke 50
8	January 23, 2026	978-4-301-00201-7; 978-4-301-00202-4 (SE)	November 17, 2026	979-8-89910-037-6
Smoke 51; Smoke 52; Smoke 53; Smoke 54; Smoke 55; Smoke 56
9	July 24, 2026	978-4-3010-0656-5	—	—
Smoke 57; Smoke 58; Smoke 59; Smoke 60; Smoke 61; Smoke 62

==== Uncollected chapters ====
These chapters have yet to be published in a tankōbon volume.

- Smoke 63
- Smoke 64
- Smoke 65

=== Anime ===
An anime television series adaptation was announced on July 18, 2025. It is produced by Asahi Production and directed by Masato Suzuki and Aoi Mori, with Mio Inoue handling series composition, Yasuka Ōtaki designing the characters, and Shin Kono and Sayaka Aoki composing the music. The series aired from July 10 to September 25, 2026, on TBS and its affiliates. For the television broadcast, the opening theme song is "Ichijiku Kemuri" (イチジク煙; 'Fig Smoke'), performed by Zutomayo, and the ending theme song is "Fiction", performed by Imase. For the Abema streaming broadcast, the opening theme song is "Kuzurinen" (クズリ念), performed by Zutomayo, and the ending theme song is "Night Dancer," performed by Imase. Crunchyroll is streaming the series. Netflix is also streaming it in select regions of Asia. An English dub by Ocean Productions debuted on the same day as the show's Netflix simulcast and two weeks later on Crunchyroll on July 23, 2026.

==== Episodes ====
No.	Title	Directed by	Written by	Storyboarded by	Original release date (Note: Twelve ten-minute long 'mini episodes' that comprised the first six full episodes of the series, premiered on Abema in Japan and Crunchyroll internationally on June 3, 2026.)
1	"Smoking Behind the Supermarket with You"; Transliteration: "Sūpā no Ura de Yani Sū Futari" (Japanese: スーパーの裏でヤニ吸うふたり)	Masato Suzuki	Mio Inoue	Masato Suzuki	July 10, 2026 (Note: Due to the broadcast of the 2026 FIVB Women's Volleyball Nations League, this episode aired at 12:41 a.m. JST, 45 minutes after the regular air time on TBS.)
2	"Cheering Up Behind the Supermarket with You"; Transliteration: "Sūpā no Ura de Soeru Futari" (Japanese: スーパーの裏で添えるふたり)	Aoi Mori	Mio Inoue	Aoi Mori	July 17, 2026 (Note: Due to the broadcast of the 2026 FIVB Women's Volleyball Nations League, this episode aired at 12:51 a.m. JST, 55 minutes after the regular air time on TBS.)
3	"Smoking Behind the Supermarket with You and More"; Transliteration: "Sūpā no Ura de Okuru Futari" (Japanese: スーパーの裏で贈るふたり)	Tomio Yamauchi	Mio Inoue	Masato Suzuki	July 23, 2026
4	"Learning Behind the Supermarket with You"; Transliteration: "Sūpā no Ura de Manabu Hitori" (Japanese: スーパーの裏で学ぶひとり)	Aoi Mori & Masato Suzuki	Misaki Morie	Aoi Mori	July 30, 2026
5	"Hanging Behind the Supermarket with You"; Transliteration: "Sūpā no Ura de Kakeru Futari" (Japanese: スーパーの裏でかけるふたり)	Yūsuke Onoda	Misaki Morie	Masato Suzuki	August 6, 2026
6	"Lingering Scent Behind the Supermarket with You"; Transliteration: "Sūpā no Ura ni Nokoru Nioi" (Japanese: スーパーの裏に残る匂い)	Aoi Mori	Mio Inoue	Aoi Mori	August 13, 2026
7	"The End of Summer Behind the Supermarket with You"; Transliteration: "Sūpā no Ura to Natsu no Owari" (Japanese: スーパーの裏と夏の終わり)	Harume Kosaka	Misaki Morie	Masato Suzuki	August 20, 2026
8	"Searching Behind the Supermarket with You"; Transliteration: "Sūpā no Ura kara Mitsukeru Futari" (Japanese: スーパーの裏から見つけるふたり)	Tomio Yamauchi	Mio Inoue	Naoki Matsuura	August 27, 2026
9	"Asking Behind the Supermarket Alone"; Transliteration: "Sūpā no Ura de Fureru Hitori" (Japanese: スーパーの裏で触れるひとり)	Kazunobu Fuseki	Mio Inoue	Takehiro Nakayama	September 4, 2026 (Note: This episode aired at 12:01 a.m. JST, 5 minutes after the regular air time on TBS.)
10	"Shining Behind the Supermarket with You"; Transliteration: "Sūpā no Ura de Hikaru Futari" (Japanese: スーパーの裏で光るふたり)	Ryōhei Endō	Misaki Morie	Aoi Mori	September 10, 2026
11	"Hello from Behind the Supermarket"; Transliteration: "Sūpā no Ura de Mukaeru Koe" (Japanese: スーパーの裏で迎える声)	Harume Kosaka	Mio Inoue	Kazutaka Muraki	September 17, 2026
12	"Keeping It Going Behind the Supermarket with You"; Transliteration: "Sūpā no Ura de Tsuzuku Futari" (Japanese: スーパーの裏で続くふたり)	Aoi Mori	Mio Inoue	Aoi Mori & Masato Suzuki	September 25, 2026 (Note: This episode aired at 12:26 a.m. JST, 30 minutes after the regular air time on TBS.)

== Reception ==
By January 2026, the manga had over 3 million copies in circulation. Smoking Behind the Supermarket with You won the 2022 Next Manga Award in the web category. The series ranked seventh in the 2023 edition of Takarajimasha's Kono Manga ga Sugoi! list of best manga for male readers. It also ranked eighth in the 16th Manga Taishō. The series was ranked fourth in the Nationwide Bookstore Employees' Recommended Comics of 2023 and first in the Nationwide Publishers' Recommended Comics of 2023. In 2026, the series has been nominated in Daruma for Best Manga at the Japan Expo Awards. It has over 200,000 copies in circulation as of volume 1.
