= Alice & Zoroku =

Japanese manga series

- First tankōbon volume cover, featuring Sana Kashimura (left) and Zoroku Kashimura (right)

アリスと蔵六 (Arisu to Zōroku)
- Genre: Fantasy, magical girl
- Manga
- Written by: Tetsuya Imai
- Published by: Tokuma Shoten
- English publisher: NA: Seven Seas
- Magazine: Monthly Comic Ryū
- Original run: October 19, 2012 – present
- Volumes: 13
- Anime television series
- Directed by: Katsushi Sakurabi
- Produced by: Shin Taniguchi; Takahiro Ishiyama; Hirotsugu Ogisu; Hirotaka Kaneko; Masato Yukita
- Written by: Fumihiko Takayama
- Music by: To-Mas
- Studio: J.C.Staff
- Licensed by: NA: Funimation
- Original network: Tokyo MX, KBS, Sun TV, BS11, AT-X
- English network: SEA: Animax Asia
- Original run: April 2, 2017 – June 25, 2017
- Episodes: 12
- icon

Alice & Zoroku (Japanese: アリスと蔵六, Hepburn: Arisu to Zōroku) is a Japanese manga series by Tetsuya Imai. It began serialization from October 2012 in Tokuma Shoten's seinen manga magazine Monthly Comic Ryū. It has been collected in thirteen tankōbon volumes. The manga won the Japan Media Arts Festival's New Face Award in 2013. An anime television series adaptation by J.C.Staff aired from April to June 2017.

== Summary ==
The existence of humans with supernatural powers is kept a dark secret, hidden from the outside world save a research facility created to understand the principles behind these people, known as 'Dreams of Alice'. The story centers around Sana, an orphan girl belonging to the research facility as an experimental test subject, and nicknamed "Red Queen" due to her immense power despite her youth and childlike demeanour. After a narrow escape from the research facility, she wanders to the city of Shinjuku and meets an old man named Zoroku Kashimura, who kindly takes her in after sympathising with her story. Soon, he adopts her as his granddaughter as they grow close during their time together, be it during dangerous situations when trying to evade the research facility and everyday troubles of Sana growing to know the outside world better.

== Characters ==
Sana Kashimura (樫村 紗名, Kashimura Sana)
Voiced by: Hitomi Ōwada (Japanese); Sarah Wiedenheft (English)
A girl with the ability to teleport and create anything she can imagine, Sana was being studied at a secret research facility until she decided to escape. She eventually crosses paths with Zoroku, who decides to take her in. Sana is also called the Red Queen (赤の女王, Aka no Joō) due to her immense power despite her being only a child.
Zoroku Kashimura (樫村 蔵六, Kashimura Zōroku)
Voiced by: Akio Otsuka (Japanese); John Swasey (English)
A rather grumpy old man with a mysterious past. He works as a florist and is Sanae's grandfather. He eventually takes Sana into his home as well.
Sanae Kashimura (樫村 早苗, Kashimura Sanae)
Voiced by: Aki Toyosaki (Japanese); Tia Ballard (English)
Zoroku's granddaughter, Sanae lives under his care due to the death of her parents and became something of an older sister to Sana.
Asahi Hinagiri (雛霧 あさひ, Hinagiri Asahi)
Voiced by: Natsumi Fujiwara (Japanese); Brittney Karbowski (English)
A Dream of Alice and Yonaga's older twin sister. She was friends with Sana in the research facility but now works to take her back. She can materialize any object connected to a chain.
Yonaga Hinagiri (雛霧 よなが, Hinagiri Yonaga)
Voiced by: Akari Kitō (Japanese); Brittany Lauda (English)
A Dream of Alice and Asahi's younger twin sister. She was friends with Sana in the research facility but now works to take her back. She can materialize a bow and arrow.
Shizuku Ichijō (一条 雫, Ichijō Shizuku)
Voiced by: Ami Koshimizu (Japanese); Anastasia Muñoz (English)
Naito's assistant, who also happens to be Dream of Alice. She has access to a storeroom containing 666 different weapons and items (including 13 grimoires) which she can materialize at any time. She is a Naicho agent.
Ryū Naitō (内藤 竜, Naitō Ryū)
Voiced by: Hōchū Ōtsuka (Japanese); Chuck Huber (English)
An old acquaintance of Zoroku who works for the police and is interested in seeing whether Dreams of Alice can coexist with humans.
Noriko Yamada (山田 のり子, Yamada Noriko)
Voiced by: Yuuki Hirose (Japanese); Madeleine Morris (English)
A tech specialist who works with Naito and Ichijo to track Dreams of Alice.
Miriam C. Tachibana (ミリアム・C・タチバナ, Miriamu C Tachibana)
Voiced by: Mamiko Noto (Japanese); Colleen Clinkenbeard (English)
Also known as "Minnie C.", Minnie is a former United States Marine Corps second lieutenant and a Dream of Alice. Her husband was killed in action during a tour of service in Iraq. She voluntarily works with the research facility to retrieve Sana. She can materialize a pair of giant arms that resemble her late husband's. In exchange for shrinking their size, Minnie can increase the number of arms she materializes and can even make them invisible to the naked eye. Her major goal in working with the research facility is to hopefully find a way to bring her husband back from the dead.
Kōichi Kitō (鬼頭 浩一, Kitō Kōichi)
Voiced by: Masaya Matsukaze (Japanese); Christopher Wehkamp (English)
The director of the research facility secretly studying Dreams of Alice.
Cleo (クレオ, Kureo)
Voiced by: Shu Uchida (Japanese); Ryan Reynolds (English)
A Dream of Alice being studied in the research facility who was with Kitō when he and the Hinagari twins were searching for Sana. He is bright and calm. He creates whatever he is able to draw (e.g. Zoroku's car, cardboard robot in the car). He is seen constantly drawing. He does not like Minnie C.
Hatori Shikishima (敷島羽鳥, Shikishima Hatori)
Voiced by: Shu Uchida (Japanese); Felecia Angelle (English)
Hatori Shikishima is an elementary school student with a troubled home life. After failing to get into a prominent school, her mother turns emotionally neglectful towards Hatori and her parents begin to constantly argue, which Hatori blames herself for. Hatori discovers her Dream of Alice can manipulate her environment and her parents to her desires.
Ayumu Miho (美浦 歩, Miho Ayumu)
Voiced by: Minami Takahashi (Japanese); Apphia Yu (English)
Ayumu Miho is Hatori's best friend and classmate and a good athlete in soccer. At first she enjoys Hatori's strange powers and the two play pranks and have fun, but she becomes more concerned about Hatori as her personality begins to change.

== Media ==
=== Manga ===
Written and illustrated by Tetsuya Imai, Alice & Zoroku began serialization from the December 2012 issue of Tokuma Shoten's seinen manga magazine Monthly Comic Ryū, published on October 19, 2012. It has been collected in thirteen tankōbon volumes. The manga won the Japan Media Arts Festival's New Face Award in 2013. The series moved to online-only serialization when Comic Ryū changed formats on June 19, 2018. The series is licensed in English by Seven Seas Entertainment.

==== Volumes ====
No.	Original release date	Original ISBN	English release date	English ISBN
1	March 30, 2013	978-4-19-950337-5	July 4, 2017	978-1-626926-48-6
2	September 13, 2013	978-4-19-950356-6	October 17, 2017	978-1-626926-49-3
3	March 29, 2014	978-4-19-950391-7	February 13, 2018	978-1-626926-50-9
4	October 11, 2014	978-4-19-950419-8	August 28, 2018	978-1-626927-33-9
5	April 13, 2015	978-4-19-950447-1	February 26, 2019	978-1-626928-35-0
6	April 13, 2016	978-4-19-950503-4	October 29, 2019	978-1-642757-19-4
7	November 11, 2016	978-4-19-950534-8	October 20, 2020	978-1-645052-33-3
8	May 13, 2017	978-4-19-950565-2	April 27, 2021	978-1-64505-657-7
9	December 13, 2019	978-4-19-950693-2	November 30, 2021	978-1-64827-902-7
10	April 13, 2023	978-4-19-950775-5	—	—
11	July 13, 2023	978-4-19-950820-2	—	—
12	February 13, 2024	978-4-19-950845-5	—	—
13	December 13, 2024	978-4-19-950886-8	—	—

=== Anime ===
An anime television series adaptation by J.C.Staff aired on April 2, 2017, with an extended 44-minute first episode and ended on June 25, 2017. It is directed by Katsushi Sakurabi and written by Fumihiko Takayama, with character designs by Kazunori Iwakura and music by To-Mas Soundsight Fluorescent Forest. It was simulcasted by Crunchyroll and Funimation provided the English dub. The series ran for 12 episodes. The series' opening theme is "Wonder Drive" by Oresama, and the ending theme is "Chant" by Toi Toy Toi.

==== Episodes ====
No.	Title	Original release date
1	"The Red Queen Escapes" "Aka no Joō, Nigeru" (Japanese: 赤の女王、逃げる)	April 2, 2017
Broadcast as a double-length episode. A blonde child named Sana escapes on a rainy night from a research facility, aided by a mysterious benefactor who helps her and tells her to "go to a large city and make a commotion". Teleporting to Shinjuku, Sana meets Zouroku Kashimura, a grumpy but kind old man whom Sana tries to "make a deal" with despite his refusal, including teleporting into his car to approach him. Ignoring her and driving off, they are attacked by two blue-haired twins, Asahi Hinagiri and Yonaga Hinagiri, who materialize objects dangling from chains as well as a bow and arrow respectively. After a chase across the streets and destroying Zouroku's car, Sana departs the car and the twins attempt to convince her to return to the research facility, going so far as to tying her up and shooting her, but is stopped by Zouroku. The three girls and him are taken to the police station to be interrogated, but halfway during Sana's interrogation she disappears after revealing the twins' names but not hers, and the twins are taken back to the research facility when the police is ordered to stop the investigation mysteriously. Zouroku is also released due to lack of evidence and is taken aback to find his car in its previous pristine condition, as well as the roads; security camera footage and videos recorded by passers-by have also all disappeared from the Internet. Deducing that this is Sana's doing, she appears to him again to request that he accept the deal and reveals her past of being experimented on due to her powerful abilities of being a 'Dream of Alice', a human with supernatural powers to create anything from imagination alone. While Zouroku decides not to get involved in this, he ultimately gives Sana lodging, clothes and food in return that she help with his work as a florist and not use her powers.
2	"Dreams of Alice" "Arisu no Yume" (Japanese: アリスの夢)	April 9, 2017
While Zouroku goes to work, he tasks his granddaughter Sanae Kashimura (who is just coming back from high school training camp) with taking care of Sana while he is away. While Sana is initially unsure of whether she can trust Sanae, the two quickly become friends when Sanae demonstrates her kind, compassionate and patient nature. Sana then tells Sanae how she has no memories prior to arriving at the research facility, and how she had befriended Asahi and Yonaga and created a fantasy world underneath the research facility. However, after she witnessed the scientists performing an inhumane experiment gone wrong, Sana decided to escape. Sanae comforts Sana, who decides to teleport to the research facility to destroy it. However, things don't go as planned as Sana cannot seem to control where she teleports to, causing her and Sanae to travel to various locations around the world before ending up in Zouroku's flower shop. Meanwhile, Zouroku contacts Ryu Naito, an old friend of his, to investigate something.
3	"Cards" "Toranpu" (Japanese: トランプ)	April 16, 2017
Kito, the director of the research facility, enlists the aid of a woman named Minnie C Tachibana to retrieve Sana. Meanwhile, it is revealed that Naito is part of a group investigating the research facility and agrees to help protect Alice. He suggests that it is best for Sana to temporarily stay with Zouroku for a little longer. However, Minnie C manages to kidnap Sana. Naito's assistant Ichijo is revealed to be a Dream of Alice as she tries to pursue Minnie C. Minnie C then recalls a time where the director showed her "Wonderland", an alternate dimension Sana created where she is able to materialize anything she wishes, unlike other Dreams of Alice who can only materialize specific objects. Minnie C wants to find a way to obtain Sana's power so she can revive her dead husband.
4	"Something Not Human" "Hitodenai Mono" (Japanese: 人でないモノ)	April 23, 2017
While Ichijo searches for Sana, Naito explains to Zouroku and Sanae that he is part of government agency that is in opposition to the research facility and wants to see if Dreams of Alice and humans can coexist. Meanwhile, Minnie C reveals to Sana that she was never human, but is instead an unknown phenomenon that has taken human form. Minnie C then drugs Sana, who meets a woman who is seemingly an older version of her in a dream. The woman tells her that it doesn't matter if she's a human or a monster and encourages her to call out Zouroku's name. In doing so, Sana teleports Zouroku to her location. Minnie C subdues him, and Sana agrees to go back to the research facility to ensure his safety, believing that she's a monster that doesn't deserve to live among humans. Zouroku tells Sana that he doesn't care if she's human or not, and simply wants to take care of her and show her the outside world like she wanted. He also criticizes Minnie C for her harsh treatment of Sana just as Ichijo arrives to rescue them.
5	"A Home to Return To" "Kaeru Tokoro" (Japanese: 帰るところ)	April 30, 2017
Ichijo battles Minnie C while Sana and Zouroku flee to safety. While at first it appears that the two women are evenly matched, Minnie C begins to gain the upper hand which forces Ichijo to use her most powerful weapons. Minnie C is quickly defeated, and Ichijo reveals to her that her power mirrors that of a magical maid on a television program she once watched, which allows her access to a storeroom that contains 666 weapons and 13 grimoires, effectively making her a living weapon. After the battle, Sana tells Zouroku that she knows she's not human and that she was created by someone for a special purpose, but she wants to live with him in order to learn more about the world and herself. Zouroku agrees to officially adopt Sana as a granddaughter. Meanwhile, police and government forces raid the research the facility and arrest Kito and Minnie C is forced to return to the United States. After the commotion dies down, Sana continues her new life with Zouroku and Sanae while Naito and Ichijo keep watch over them.
6	"The Kashimura Family" "Kashimura Ke" (Japanese: 樫村家)	May 14, 2017
Sana begins living her new life with Zouroku and Sanae and getting used to their daily routine. As Zouroku takes Sana to work, he cautions her not to use her powers carelessly. Sana then helps Zouroku and his assistants set up the flower arrangement for an engagement party, where she learns the concept marriage. Zouroku then notices that Sana's hair is too long to the point where she keeps accidentally stepping on it and takes her to a barber to get it cut. Zouroku then goes to fulfill some errands and retrieve some documents from Naito, but Sana wanders off on her own. She then gets lost and is eventually picked up by the police. When Zouroku retrieves her, he reminds her that even though he told her not to use her powers carelessly, she can still use them if necessary, such as summoning him if she is lost. When they return home, Zouroku gifts Sana a stuffed pig he had bought earlier, and presents the documents he received from Naito. They are adoption papers, which officially make Sana part of the Kashimura family.
7	"Friends" "Tomodachi" (Japanese: ともだち)	May 21, 2017
Zouroku and Ichijo take Sana on a field trip to show her more of the outside world. However, while walking through the city, Sana encounters Asahi and Yonaga by chance. The twins use their powers to flee and Sana uses hers to give chase. However, Sana's powers suffer an "error" that randomly manifests a massive rock that threatens to crush her and Asahi and Yonaga. Fortunately, Ichijo is able to destroy the rock and secure the three girls. Asahi and Yonaga apologize to Sana for trying to force her to come back to the research facility and prevent her from knowing about the outside world. Ichijo mentions reveals to Zouroku that the twins were abused by their father and used their powers to kill him in self defense, and were subsequently sent to the research facility. The twins tell Sana that after the facility was shut down, all of the Dreams of Alice, including them, were sent to foster homes where they are living happy lives. Upon returning home, Sana confides in Sanae that the day's events had left her "frazzled", as she is unsure of what emotions she's feeling. Sanae comforts Sana and teaches her how to send e-mails to Asahi and Yonaga, where she reaffirms their friendship and tells them she wants to play with them again someday.
8	"The Evil Witch" "Waruimajo" (Japanese: 悪い魔女)	May 28, 2017
Hatori is a young girl who lives in a troubled family, with her parents constantly arguing with each other. Thinking that it's her fault her parents are angry at each other, Hatori wishes that they would get along, which is when her Dream of Alice power manifests. The next day, Hatori, along with her friend Ayumu, find out that Hatori can use her power to mind control people. However, a side effect of this power is that it turns whoever she's controlling into a mindless, emotionless puppet for a period of time. After using her power for fun and to play pranks on her classmates, Hatori comes to the realization that she had been unconsciously using her power to mind control her own parents into having a happy marriage again. Horrified at the revelation, Hatori decides to run away from home, and Ayumu decides to accompany her. Hatori then uses her power to stop the entire city, which also freezes Zouroku, though Sana remains unaffected. In fright, Sana goes out to see what's going on and encounters Hatori. Upon realizing Hatori is at fault, Sana attempts to attack her, breaking Hatori's spell. However, Sana and Hatori's powers appear to cancel each other out whenever Sana tries to manifest something, and Hatori flees while Sana faints from overusing her powers. Hatori realizes she must have caused great distress to Sana by freezing everybody around her, and laments that she's become an "evil witch".
9	"Where the Cheshire Cat Smiles" "Chesha Neko no Warau Basho" (Japanese: チェシャ猫の笑う場所)	June 4, 2017
Hatori decides to return home and is greeted by her mother, though Hatori is unsure if her mother is acting naturally or under her power. Meanwhile, Sana wakes up back at her home, where she's relieved everybody is okay. Asahi and Yonaga are also present and take up Zouroku's request to stay over for the night. The twins are amazed at how much Sana has learned while living with Zouroku and Sanae, and are happy that she's having such a good life. The next day, Asahi and Yonaga leave, and Sana decides to search for Hatori to get revenge on her. Ayumu goes to check on Hatori as she has not been seen for several days, and Hatori tells her that she's decided to lock herself up in her own home since she believes she can no longer live among normal people. Meanwhile, Naito and Yamada attempt to make contact with Hatori, but she keeps using her power to turn them away. Ayumu decides to find Sana, believing she can somehow help. However, as she searches, she accidentally triggers a trap set by Sana which plunges her into Wonderland. Sana, thinking Ayumu is Hatori, then confronts her.
10	"The Little Queen" "Chīsana Joō" (Japanese: 小さな女王)	June 11, 2017
Ayumu apologizes to Sana and pleads with her to find a way to help Hatori. Confused, Sana agrees and releases Ayumu. She then opens up a doorway to Hatori's house and lures her into Wonderland. She then confronts Hatori, accusing her of being evil. Hatori agrees that she is evil due to her powers, which further confuses Sana. Hatori then suspects that Ayumu told Sana about her, otherwise Sana would not have known where she lived. She then tries to use her power to force Sana to tell the truth about Ayumu, which causes an unintended reaction with Sana's power. The building they are in then collapses. Back in the real world, Yamada notices that Wonderland has suddenly began to expand at an alarming rate. At the same time, Dreams of Alice begin appear all over the city. Ayumu returns home to find out that Hatori is missing, and that both Ayumu's and Hatori's parents have gone out to search for her. Zouroku receives a call from Ichijo informing him that Sana is most likely trapped in Wonderland. Zouroku prepares to head to the research facility to enter Wonderland and find her. Back in Wonderland, both Sana and Hatori find themselves at the bottom of a chasm. Sana tries to teleport the both of them out but her power no longer works, leaving them trapped.
11	"The Queen and the Witch" "Joō to Majo" (Japanese: 女王と魔女)	June 18, 2017
Zouroku and Sanae travel to the research facility where they enter Wonderland with Ichijo to find Sana and Hatori. However, shortly after entering Wonderland, Zouroku and Sanae are separated from Ichijo. With no other leads, the two follow a spotted pig on the hunch that it will lead them to Sana. Along the way, they find numerous statues depicting Sana's past memories. Meanwhile, Sana and Hatori manage to find their way out of the chasm, but the doorway Sana used to lure Hatori into Wonderland has disappeared. Sana and Hatori then take shelter in a nearby mansion. Sana explains to Hatori that Wonderland has a mind of its own and is constantly experimenting to find out its own rules, and that it uses the Dreams of Alice as a way to see into the human world to learn from them. Hatori tells Sana about how she wants to stay in Wonderland due to her parents always fighting, as well as her fear that her own mother hates her to the point where she wishes she never existed. Sana replies that even though she questions her own existence, the things she's experienced in the outside world and with Zouroku and Sanae make her continue to want to exist. Inspired by Sana's words, Hatori tells her that she wants to go back to see her mother at least one more time. At that moment, a black orb falls from the sky.
12	"I'm Home" "Tadaima" (Japanese: ただいま)	June 25, 2017
As Hatori's parents desperately search for Hatori, it is revealed that she and Sana have been missing for ten days in the real world. In Wonderland, the two girls attempt to find a new exit and come across a rabbit that is holding Hatori's cell phone. Realizing the rabbit can call to the outside world with the phone, Sana and Hatori manage to capture it and make a call to Ayumu. Sana tells Ayumu that there should still be a "rabbit hole" in the real world that leads to Wonderland, which they can use to escape. Ayumu remembers the door Sana originally used to capture her and finds it, opening it and reuniting with Hatori and Sana. At the same time, Zouroku and Sanae arrive. However, at that moment, Wonderland begins to expand even further, threatening to burst into the real world. Angry, Zouroku yells at Wonderland to stop its expansion and it complies. They manage to reunite with Ichijo and return to the real world. Upon returning home, Hatori realizes that her parents truly do care for her when they embrace her in relief. Some time later, the government officially confirms the existence of Dreams of Alice and announces the formation of a special government agency to handle them. Naito, Ichijo, and Yamada observe events as they unfold, with Naito hoping that the world will change for the better. Meanwhile, Zouroku arranges for Sana to start going school, with Hatori and Ayumu as her classmates. Finally, an adult Sana thanks Zouroku for everything he has done for her.

== See also ==
- Break of Dawn, another manga series by the same author
