= AŌP =

Japanese girl group

AŌP A応P
- Genres: J-pop
- Years active: 2012–2021
- Label: Sony Music Japan
- Members: Yūna Asahi; Hinaki Kudō; Rin Kojima; Yukina Tsutsumi; Non Harusaki; Yuuki Hirose; Seena Hoshiki
- Past members: Yuriko Hisaki; Misae Komori; Saki Shimizugawa; Marina Amane; Saori Ogino; Risa Sakurana; Yui Fukuo; Aoi Mizuki; Kei Tomoe
- Website: aopanimelove.jp

AŌP (A応P) was a Japanese idol group known for singing anime songs, many of which have charted on Oricon.

The group disbanded on March 31, 2021.

== Members ==
=== Final lineup ===
- Yuuki Hirose (広瀬 ゆうき, Hirose Yūki) (Original Member)
- Yūna Asahi (旭 優奈, Asahi Yūna) (Joined March 5, 2018)
- Hinaki Kudō (工藤 ひなき, Kudō Hinaki) (Joined March 5, 2018)
- Rin Kojima (小嶋 凛, Kojima Rin) (Joined March 5, 2018)
- Yukina Tsutsumi (堤 雪菜, Tsutsumi Yukina) (Joined March 5, 2018)
- Non Harusaki (春咲 暖, Harusaki Non) (Joined March 5, 2018)
- Seena Hoshiki (星希 成奏, Hoshiki Seena) (Joined March 5, 2018)

=== Former members ===
- Yuriko Hisaki (樋崎 悠里子, Hisaki Yuriko) (Original Member; Left February 28, 2013)
- Misae Komori (小森 未彩, Komori Misae) (Original Member; Left July 31, 2015)
- Saki Shimizugawa (清水川 沙季, Shimizugawa Saki) (Original Member; Left July 31, 2015)
- Marina Amane (天音 まりな, Amane Marina) (Joined August 7, 2015; Left December 31, 2015)
- Saori Ogino (荻野 沙織, Ogino Saori) (Original Member; Left March 31, 2017)
- Risa Sakurana (桜奈 里彩, Sakurana Risa) (Original Member; Left March 31, 2017)
- Yui Fukuo (福緒 唯, Fukuo Yui) (Joined August 7, 2015; Graduated June 30, 2018)
- Aoi Mizuki (水希 蒼, Mizuki Aoi) (Joined August 7, 2015; Graduated March 1, 2019)
- Kei Tomoe (巴 奎依, Tomoe Kei) (Original Member; Graduated August 2, 2020)

== Discography ==
=== Singles ===
Title	Year	Single details	Peak chart positions		Sales	Notes	Ref
Title	Year	Single details	JPN	JPN Hot	Sales	Notes	Ref
"Zenryoku Batankyū"	2016	Released: 10 February 2016; Label: Ultimate; Formats: CD	2	—	—	Mr. Osomatsu theme song	
"Cotona MODE/Hatsukoi Hello Chūihō"	2016	Released: 25 May 2016; Label: Anime "Katte ni" Ōen Project; Formats: CD	31	—	—	B-side is theme song of AŌP no Animusu!!	
"Kibō Traveler"	2016	Released: 24 August 2016; Label: Anime "Katte ni" Ōen Project; Formats: CD	41	—	—	Opening theme of Time Travel Girl	
"Ano ne, kimi dake ni"	2016	Released: 9 November 2016; Label: Anime "Katte ni" Ōen Project; Formats: CD	29	—	—	Age 12 opening theme	
"Dia Horizon"	2017	Released: 8 February 2017; Label: Anime "Katte ni" Ōen Project; Formats: CD	137	—	—	Grimms Notes	
"Jitensha ni hana wa mau"	2017	Released: 1 March 2017; Label: Anime "Katte ni" Ōen Project; Formats: CD	68	—	—	Opening theme of Minami Kamakura High School Girls Cycling Club	
"Another World"	2017	Released: 23 August 2017; Label: Anime "Katte ni" Ōen Project; Formats: CD	22	—	—	Opening theme of In Another World with My Smartphone	
"Kimi-shi ayauku mo chikau yore"	2017	Released: 21 November 2017; Label: Anime "Katte ni" Ōen Project; Formats: CD	13	—	—	Opening theme of Osomatsu-san	
"Maboroshi Wing"	2018	Released: 20 February 2018; Label: Anime "Katte ni" Ōen Project; Formats: CD	23	—	—	Opening theme of Osomatsu-san	
"Ai ga Nakucha Tatakaenai"	2018	Released: 4 June 2018; Label: Anime "Katte ni" Ōen Project; Formats: CD	53	—	—	Opening theme of Cutie Honey Universe	
"Koi ni saku nazo, harahara to"	2018	Released: 22 August 2018; Label: Anime "Katte ni" Ōen Project; Formats: CD	51	—	—	Opening theme of Kyōto Teramachi Sanjō no Holmes	
"Hulaing Babies"	2019	Released: Label: Anime "Katte ni" Ōen Project; Formats: CD	79	—	—	Opening song of Hulaing Babies	
"Soreyuke! Koigokoro/Tsunagu"	2019	Released: 10 May 2019; Label: Anime "Katte ni" Ōen Project; Formats: CD	54	—	—	Ending theme of Over Drive Girl 1/6	
"—" denotes releases that did not chart or were not released in that region.

=== Albums ===
Title	Year	Album details	Peak chart positions		Sales	Notes	Ref
Title	Year	Album details	JPN	JPN Hot	Sales	Notes	Ref
"AŌP"	2016	Released: 13 August 2016; Label: Anime "Katte ni" Ōen Project; Formats: CD	94	—	—	Opening theme of Osomatsu-san	
"Zenryoku Batankyū"	2016	Released: 24 December 2016; Label: Anime "Katte ni" Ōen Project; Formats: CD	142	—	—	Opening theme of Osomatsu-san	
"Y"	2017	Released: 29 April 2017; Label: Anime "Katte ni" Ōen Project; Formats: CD	174	—	—	Includes music from an Osomatsu-san game	
"X"	2017	Released: 31 May 2017; Label: Anime "Katte ni" Ōen Project; Formats: CD	110	—	—		
"—" denotes releases that did not chart or were not released in that region.
