= Chillin' in Another World with Level 2 Super Cheat Powers =

Japanese light novel series

- First light novel volume cover

Lv2からチートだった元勇者候補のまったり異世界ライフ (Lv2 kara Chīto datta Moto Yūsha Kōho no Mattari Isekai Raifu)
- Genre: Fantasy comedy; Isekai; Romantic comedy
- Novel series
- Written by: Miya Kinojo
- Published by: Shōsetsuka ni Narō
- Original run: 2016 – 2019
- Light novel
- Written by: Miya Kinojo
- Illustrated by: Katagiri
- Published by: Overlap
- English publisher: NA: J-Novel Club
- Imprint: Overlap Novels
- Original run: December 25, 2016 – present
- Volumes: 22
- Manga
- Written by: Miya Kinojo
- Illustrated by: Akine Itomachi
- Published by: Overlap
- English publisher: NA: Seven Seas Entertainment
- Imprint: Gardo Comics
- Magazine: Comic Gardo
- Original run: January 11, 2019 – present
- Volumes: 15
- Anime television series
- Directed by: Yoshiaki Iwasaki
- Written by: Megumi Shimizu
- Music by: Kujira Yumemi
- Studio: J.C.Staff
- Licensed by: Crunchyroll: SA/SEA: Muse Communication
- Original network: AT-X, Tokyo MX, Sun TV, KBS Kyoto, BS11
- Original run: April 8, 2024 – present
- Episodes: 12
- icon

Chillin' in Another World with Level 2 Super Cheat Powers (Japanese: Lv2からチートだった元勇者候補のまったり異世界ライフ, Hepburn: Lv2 kara Chīto datta Moto Yūsha Kōho no Mattari Isekai Raifu) is a Japanese light novel series written by Miya Kinojo and illustrated by Katagiri. The series was initially serialized on the user-generated novel publishing website Shōsetsuka ni Narō between 2016 and 2019. It was later acquired by Overlap who began to publish it as a light novel in December 2016 under their Overlap Novels imprint. A manga adaptation illustrated by Akine Itomachi began serialization in Overlap's Comic Gardo website in January 2019. An anime television series adaptation produced by J.C.Staff aired from April to June 2024. A second season has been announced.

== Premise ==
Banaza is summoned to another world by the Kingdom of Klyrode as a hero candidate, but is found to have inadequate skills and banished to a dangerous forest. After slaying a slime, Banaza levels up and gets infinite stats, obtaining god-like powers. He later defeats and befriends Fenrys, a female demon wolf who becomes his first friend in this new world and later becomes his wife. Using his new skills, he assumes a new human form and starts calling himself "Flio" in order to stay out of the conflict between humans and demons. However, as he makes more and more friends in both human and demon societies, Flio and his allies decide to join together and come with a way to end the war between both races and have them learn to coexist instead.

== Characters ==
=== Main characters ===
Banaza / Flio
Voiced by: Satoshi Hino (Japanese); Mauricio Ortiz-Segura (English)
The hero of the story, a humble merchant summoned from a world poisoned by slavery and prejudice. Due to Flio and the Blonde Hero being summoned back to back, Flio accidentally got both of their blessings, which resulted in his infinite powers, granting him strong abilities. While he desires a quiet life as he had in his old world, having no interest in fighting or taking part in a war, he ends up having to be the good Samaritan a lot.
Fenrys / Rys
Voiced by: Rie Kugimiya (Japanese); Megan Shipman (English)
A demon wolf and Flio's wife. She originally wed Flio due to her tribe's tradition of submitting to the strong after he defeated her during their first encounter, but came to love him and their simple life. Rys is very territorial of her mate, but is otherwise welcoming to others. She does not like Flio being bothered to take part in the human-demon conflict, which she is supportive of as he does not want to fight.
Balirossa
Voiced by: Aya Yamane (Japanese); Jessica Peterson (English)
The leader of a C-Rank party of adventurers who become Flio and Rys's housemates, eventually joining their neutral position toward the war. A knight of Klyrode seeking to gain a noble title to restore her family's lost prestige. Despite being a little lacking in common sense (thinking a bear respects chivalry), Balirossa is a competent fighter. She has feelings towards Gholl.
Gholl / Ghozal
Voiced by: Tomoaki Maeno (Japanese); Ray Hurd (English)
The former Dark One ("Demon Lord") and a friend to Flio and Rys. The twelfth to hold the title throughout the 500-year war, he dislikes needless conflicts, which is why the Dark Army has largely been at a standstill with humanity for many years. He initially sought to gain Flio's strength for his army, but grew to enjoy his company instead. Gholl also became smitten with Balirossa due to her threatening him at swordpoint when they first met, she initially unaware of who he was.
Blossom
Voiced by: Mari Hino (Japanese); Vanessa Benoit (English)
One of Balirossa's party, a tomboyish swordswoman who favors heavy attacks. She was previously a farmer until being recruited into the army. Befriending Flio, Blossom largely returned to her farming roots; growing crops for Flio to sell. She also holds the title of "Dragon Slayer", thanks to Flio's powering up her weapon toss to decapitate a dragon.
Sybe
Voiced by: Yuka Iguchi (Japanese); Reshel Mae (English)
The pet psychobear of the Flio household; often in the form of a small horned rabbit. He helps Blossom out in the fields and is her close friend.
Belano
Voiced by: Nene Hieda (Japanese); Monica Rial (English)
One of Balirossa's party, a quiet mage specializing in defense spells hoping to be a court mage like her father and brother. However, she has a low MP and gets nauseated from a single cast. In the end, she decides to get a job as a teacher at a magic academy; granting her great benefits and allowing her to pass on her observations on Flio's magic.
Byleri
Voiced by: Yuuki Hirose (Japanese); Marisa Duran (English)
One of Balirossa's party, an archer, though not by choice; she previously tended to the horses at the castle until being forced to the front lines. Seeing her equestrian skills were more beneficial, Byleri took to helping plow the fields with Blossom and delivering the wares from Flio's store.
Uliminas
Voiced by: Yukari Tamura (Japanese); Lisette Monique Diaz (English)
A hellcat in charge of Ghozal's spy network "Silent Ear". Though shocked Flio had calmed down Rys and even befriended her master, Uliminas begrudgingly accepted the results. She is also in love with Ghozal, so she's a bit jealous of Balirossa.
Hiya
Voiced by: Yui Horie (Japanese); Maganda Marie (English)
An androgynous djinn of great power. They attempted to grant the Blonde Hero's wish to kill Flio, but wounded Rys instead; earning a terrible beating. After being spared by Flio, Hiya swore loyalty to him as a servant. Hiya has no true gender, but can become either one.
Princess/Queen Elizabeth of Klyrode
Voiced by: Ayako Kawasumi (Japanese); Naya Moreno (English)
The current ruler of Klyrode. Unlike her oafish father, she is kind and considerate of those her kingdom may wrong. After her father fell into a coma, she took the throne and forced her father to step down after he recovered. After resolving the issue with Hiya and Damalynas, the queen contracts Flio to undertake secret missions to keep the humans and demons from escalating fights at their borders, as she very well understands Flio's refusal to fight.

=== Supporting characters ===
Tsuya
Voiced by: Mikako Takahashi (Japanese); Alexis Tipton (English)
A slave girl who was assigned to be the Blonde Hero's faithful servant. Despite his incompetence and inherent cowardice, she stays by his side as she firmly believes he is the hero that will save the world.
Damalynas
Voiced by: Shizuka Itō (Japanese); Ezra Vervin (English)
An ancient magic user for the Dark Lord's army who was sealed away in the Royal Armory behind the same magical seal that held Hiya. Damalynas turned the Blonde Hero into a tyrannical monster to help get revenge on all who stood in the way, and took over Tsuya's body for her own, but Hiya eventually defeats her and consumes her soul, trapping her inside their pocket dimension.
Yuigarde
Voiced by: Taiten Kusunoki
Gholl's brother, who is more ruthless than him and later becomes the new Dark One. Unfortunately, he's too much of a meat head to make any progress and is terrible at managing his territory; the Infernal Four becomes disillusioned with him.
Phufun
Voiced by: Satomi Arai
A succubus who works for Yuigarde. She tried to steer him in the right direction, but ultimately just enjoys being injured by him when he lashes out.
Greanyl
One of the Dark One's servants.
Fengaryl
Rys's brother, who was unintentionally killed by Flio's magic. Rys did not try to avenge him as she considers his death to be his own fault. He is not seen, only mentioned.
Infernal Four
A group of monsters who currently work for Yuigarde.

=== Antagonists ===
Blonde Hero
Voiced by: Taishi Murata (Japanese); Monty Thompson (English)
An arrogant coward, who took advantage of his status as hero to live in luxury. Unlike Flio, his status will not increase no matter how much he levels up, mostly because he is not the true hero. While the King is nevertheless supportive of him, his daughter is not. After being forced on the run for his incompetence (due to Elizabeth taking the throne and forcing her father out of power), the Blonde Hero ends up accidentally destroying all the schemes of the King and current Dark One; unintentionally fulfilling his role. Nevertheless, he still vowed to be seen as a hero and get revenge on Flio. He keeps his true name a secret.
Klyrode King/Dark King
Voiced by: Tomoyuki Shimura (Japanese); Barry Yandell (English)
Formerly the ruler of Klyrode Kingdom. He kept kidnapping "hero candidates" from other worlds to be sent as soldiers to fight the demons. Despite how incompetent the Blonde Hero is, he still chose to support him no matter what. After going into a coma to cast a purification shield around the kingdom, his daughter took the throne, which forces him out of power. Waking up, he stole funds and teamed up with kitsune twins to scam money from both sides.

== Media ==
=== Light novel ===
Written by Miya Kinojo, the series was serialized on the user-generated novel publishing website Shōsetsuka ni Narō from 2016 to 2019, when Kinojo stopped posting on the site. The series was later acquired by Overlap who began publishing it as a light novel with illustrations by Katagiri under their Overlap Novels imprint on December 25, 2016. As of September 20, 2026, twenty-two volumes have been released. The light novels are licensed in North America by J-Novel Club.

No.	Original release date	Original ISBN	English release date	English ISBN
1	December 25, 2016	978-4-86554-180-9	September 10, 2021	978-1-7183-7998-5
1. Chapter 1: "The Hero Candidate"; 2. Chapter 2: "Fenrys"; 3. Chapter 3: "The Shadow of the Dark One"; 4. Chapter 4: "The Djinn and the Archmage of Midnight"; 5. Epilogue
2	April 25, 2017	978-4-86554-208-0	November 12, 2021	978-1-7183-8000-4
1. Chapter 1: "The Lay of the Land"; 2. Chapter 2: "The Silent Listener"; 3. Chapter 3: "The Coup"; 4. Intermission; 5. Chapter 4: "A Steamy Hot Spring Vacation"; 6. Chapter 5: "The Former Dark One and the Two Fox Sisters"
3	August 25, 2017	978-4-86554-248-6	January 14, 2022	978-1-7183-8002-8
1. Chapter 1: "The Fli-o'-Rys General Store"; 2. Chapter 2: "An Ordinary Day for the House of Flio"; 3. Chapter 3: "Flio Goes to the Calgosi Coast, Part 1"; 4. Chapter 4: "The Dark One, the Queen, and the Hero"; 5. Chapter 5: "Flio Goes to the Calgosi Coast, Part 2"; 6. Epilogue
4	January 25, 2018	978-4-86554-295-0	March 25, 2022	978-1-7183-8004-2
1. Chapter 1: "At Long Last!"; 2. Chapter 2: "The Creeping Shadow"; 3. Chapter 3: "Capriccio for the Honey"; 4. Chapter 4: "Babies in Another World with Level 2 Super Cheat Powers"; 5. Chapter 5: "Flio Goes to the Mountains"; 6. Epilogue
5	May 25, 2018	978-4-86554-353-7	May 27, 2022	978-1-7183-8006-6
1. Chapter 1: "Flio's Family"; 2. Chapter 2: "The Maiden Queen's Day Off"; 3. Chapter 3: "Yuigarde Calls It Quits"; 4. Chapter 4: "Let's Go to School!"; 5. Chapter 5: "Dark Regent Calsi'im"; 6. Epilogue
6	September 25, 2018	978-4-86554-397-1	August 1, 2022	978-1-7183-8008-0
1. Chapter 1: "Flio's Busy Day"; 2. Chapter 2: "The Maid who Fell from the Sky"; 3. Chapter 3: "Yuigarde Continues to Call It Quits"; 4. Chapter 4: "Let's Go to Summer Camp!"; 5. Chapter 5: "Capriccio for the Dark Citadel"; 6. Epilogue
7	January 25, 2019	978-4-86554-442-8	October 21, 2022	978-1-7183-8010-3
1. Chapter 1: "Blessings and Disasters"; 2. Chapter 2: "The Former Dark One Becomes a Father"; 3. Chapter 3: "Capriccio for the House of Flio"; 4. Chapter 4: "Flio Goes to the Mountains (Again)"; 5. Chapter 5: "Hello Darkness My Old Friend"; 6. Epilogue
8	July 25, 2019	978-4-86554-526-5	January 13, 2023	978-1-7183-8012-7
1. Chapter 1: "Flio, Rys, and the Fli-o'-Rys General Store"; 2. Chapter 2: "Dogorogma"; 3. Chapter 3: "Dark Mountain Pudding Pudding Park"; 4. Chapter 4: "The Bride of the Dark One"; 5. Epilogue; 6. Side story: "Everyone's Morrow Part 8"
9	January 25, 2020	978-4-86554-603-3	April 10, 2023	978-1-7183-8014-1
1. Chapter 1: "Flio's House Gets Even Bigger"; 2. Chapter 2: "Are These Goddesses Useful For Anything!? (Descent of the No-Goddesses)"; 3. Chapter 3: "Hole: Thus Hero Gold-Hair Fought"; 4. Chapter 4: "Rys, the Goddess?"; 5. Epilogue; 6. Side story: "Everyone's Morrow Part 9"
10	July 25, 2020	978-4-86554-704-7	June 30, 2023	978-1-7183-8016-5
1. Chapter 1: "The Enchanted Frigate Station"; 2. Chapter 2: "Flio Returns to the Calgosi Coast, Part 1"; 3. Chapter 3: "Hole: Thus Hero Gold-Hair Fought"; 4. Chapter 4: "Flio Returns to the Calgosi Coast, Part 2"; 5. Epilogue; 6. Side story: "Everyone's Morrow Part 10"
11	January 25, 2021	978-4-86554-828-0	September 22, 2023	978-1-7183-8018-9
1. Chapter 1: "Flio and the Oni Village"; 2. Chapter 2: "Flio in the Land of the Rising Sun"; 3. Chapter 3: "Hole: Thus Hero Gold-Hair Fought"; 4. Chapter 4: "Garyl and Ben'ne"; 5. Epilogue; 6. Side story: "Everyone's Morrow Part 11"
12	July 25, 2021	978-4-86554-960-7	December 15, 2023	978-1-7183-8020-2
1. Chapter 1: "Demons and Magic Beasts"; 2. Chapter 2: "Dark Mountain Magic Beast Racing Hall"; 3. Chapter 3: "Hole: Thus Hero Gold-Hair Fought: The Tamer and the Magic Beasts"; 4. Chapter 4: "The Klyrode Institute for Chivalric Education"; 5. Chapter 5: "A Festival for the New Town"; 6. Epilogue; 7. Side story: "Everyone's Morrow Part 12"
13	January 25, 2022	978-4-8240-0089-7	March 29, 2024	978-1-7183-8022-6
1. Chapter 1: "Flio's Hardworking Household"; 2. Chapter 2: "The Houghtow City Girls' Collection"; 3. Chapter 3: "Hole: Thus Hero Gold-Hair Fought: The Golden Warrior"; 4. Chapter 4: "Elinàsze at the Oldwass College of Magic"; 5. Epilogue; 6. Side story: "Everyone's Morrow Part 13"
14	July 25, 2022	978-4-8240-0244-0	June 28, 2024	978-1-7183-8024-0
1. Chapter 1: "Flio's Family Vacation"; 2. Chapter 2: "The Fli-o'-Rys Magic Beast Racing Hall"; 3. Chapter 3: "Hole: Thus Hero Gold-Hair Fought: Hero Gold-Hair Gets Scouted"; 4. Chapter 4: "The Maiden Queen's Day Off"; 5. Epilogue; 6. Side story: "Everyone's Morrow Part 14"
15	January 25, 2023	978-4-8240-0392-8	September 20, 2024	978-1-7183-8026-4
1. Chapter 1: "Flio's House in the New World"; 2. Chapter 2: "The Third Princess on the Job"; 3. Chapter 3: "Hole: Thus Hero Gold-Hair Fought: The Beast of Disaster from the Underground Lake"; 4. Chapter 4: "Wyne and the Dragonewt of Water"; 5. Epilogue; 6. Side story: "Everyone's Morrow Part 15"
16	October 25, 2023	978-4-8240-0635-6	December 20, 2024	978-1-7183-8028-8
1. Chapter 1: "Flio Fixes the Sky"; 2. Chapter 2: ""I'm His Wife, After All!""; 3. Chapter 3: "Hole: Thus Hero Gold-Hair Fought"; 4. Chapter 4: "Castle Celestia"; 5. Epilogue; 6. Side story: "Everyone's Morrow Part 16"
17	March 25, 2024	978-4-8240-0768-1	April 2, 2025	978-1-7183-8030-1
1. Chapter 1: "Flio, at Home and Abroad"; 2. Chapter 2: "The Houghtow College of Magic, Renew"; 3. Chapter 3: "Hole: Thus Hero Gold-Hair Fought: Attack on the Desert Checkpoint"; 4. Chapter 4: "Garyl and the Second Princess: Top Secret"; 5. Epilogue; 6. Side story: "Everyone's Morrow Part 17"
18	July 25, 2024	978-4-8240-0890-9	June 11, 2025	978-1-7183-8032-5
1. Chapter 1: "Flio's Goddess Problem"; 2. Chapter 2: "The Houghtow City Training Hall"; 3. Chapter 3: "Hole: Thus Hero Gold-Hair Fought"; 4. Chapter 4: "The Super Beast Incident"; 5. Epilogue; 6. Side story: "Everyone's Morrow Part 18"
19	February 25, 2025	978-4-8240-1089-6	November 19, 2025	978-1-7183-8034-9
1. Chapter 1: "Flio's Adventures in the Far East"; 2. Chapter 2: "The Land of the Rising Sun"; 3. Chapter 3: "Hole: Thus Hero Gold-Hair Fought"; 4. Chapter 4: "The Land of the Rising Sun: Part Two"; 5. Epilogue; 6. Side story: "Everyone's Morrow Part 19"
20	August 25, 2025	978-4-8240-1307-1	August 4, 2026	978-1-7183-8036-3
1. Chapter 1: "Flio, Hard at Work"; 2. Chapter 2: "The Order of Lupine Knights and Elinàsze's Workshop"; 3. Chapter 3: "Hole: Thus Hero Gold-Hair Fought"; 4. Chapter 4: "Lord Flio of Houghtow"; 5. Epilogue; 6. Side story: "Everyone's Morrow Part 20"
21	March 25, 2026	978-4-8240-1569-3	December 21, 2026	978-1-7183-8038-7
22	September 20, 2026	978-4-8240-1852-6	—	—

=== Manga ===
A manga adaptation by Akine Itomachi began serialization in Overlap's Comic Gardo website in January 2019. As of September 20, 2026, the manga has been collected in fifteen volumes. The manga adaptation is licensed in North America by Seven Seas Entertainment.

No.	Original release date	Original ISBN	English release date	English ISBN
1	July 25, 2019	978-4-86554-527-2	August 24, 2021	978-1-64827-432-9
1. "Hero Candidate"; 2. "Suspicion"; 3. "Fenrys"; 4. "Customs"; 5. "The Party"; Special short story: "Snuggling with Sybe"
2	January 25, 2020	978-4-86554-605-7	November 23, 2021	978-1-64827-453-4
6. "Training"; 7. "A Visitor"; 8. "Once Upon a Time"; 9. "Invasion"; 10. "Hiya the Djinn"; Special short story: "First Encounters"
3	July 25, 2020	978-4-86554-707-8	March 15, 2022	978-1-63858-147-5
11. "What's Important"; 12. "Damalynas, Grand Magus of Midnight"; 13. "True Power"; 14. "Farewell"; 15. "A Former Knight's Dream"; Special short story: "Balirossa, Blossom, Byleri... and Finally Belano"
4	January 25, 2021	978-4-86554-834-1	August 16, 2022 (digital); August 30, 2022 (print)	978-1-63858-388-2
16. "From Now On"; 17. "Lord of Demonkind"; 18. "Negotiation"; 19. "A Demon's Pride"; 20. "A Difference of Opinion"; Special short story: "The Very First Step"
5	July 25, 2021	978-4-86554-967-6	January 16, 2023	978-1-63858-887-0
21. "New Housemates"; 22. "Dumb Luck"; 23. "Kinosaki Hot Spring Resort"; 24. "Measuring Up"; 25. "Customers from Hell"; Special short story: "Something Missing"
6	January 25, 2022	978-4-8240-0098-9	June 6, 2023	978-1-68579-490-3
26. "Feasting and Fun"; 27. "Underground Maneuvers"; 28. "The Fox Sisters"; 29. "Legendary Fan"; 30. "A Helping Hand"; Special short story: "Balirossa's Heart"
7	July 25, 2022	978-4-8240-0252-5	December 12, 2023	978-1-68579-949-6
31. "Goddesses of the Celestial Plane"; 32. "Setting Out"; 33. "A Dream in Motion"; 34. "Each Side's Desire"; 35. "The Wolves of Justice"; Special short story: "When Uliminas Met Gholl"
8	January 25, 2023	978-4-8240-0402-4	May 14, 2024	979-8-88843-590-8
36. "The Cost of Control"; 37. "Those Who Were Saved"; 38. "Research"; 39. "The Dark Line"; 40. "Suppression"; Special short story: "The Right Cat for the Job"
9	October 25, 2023	978-4-8240-0643-1	November 26, 2024	979-8-89160-511-4
41. "A Proposal"; 42. "Perspective"; 43. "Magic Items"; 44. "Time for Two"; 45. "The Gate of Passage"; Special short story: "Even I Get Angry"
10	March 25, 2024	978-4-8240-0780-3	May 27, 2025	979-8-89373-131-6
46. "The Hero's Records"; 47. "Errands"; 48. "Where the Wyverns Roost"; 49. "The Djinn from the Realm of Evil"; 50. "Magic Gems, Magic Power"; Special short story: "Hmm?"
11	July 25, 2024	978-4-8240-0901-2	October 7, 2025	979-8-89373-606-9
51. "Avalanche"; 52. "A Heart Entrusted"; 53. "Playing in the Snow"; 54. "A Troublesome New Arrival"; 55. "Celestial Magic"; Special short story: "The Night Before"
12	February 25, 2025	978-4-8240-1100-8	March 31, 2026	979-8-89561-919-3
56. "The Life Inside"; 57. "The Value of Strength"; 58. "New Values"; 59. "Preparing for the Birth"; 60. "Two Hopes"; Special short story: "Travel Log"
13	August 25, 2025	978-4-8240-1321-7	September 8, 2026	979-8-89765-897-8
61. "Growth Spurt"; 62. "The Twins Grow"; 63. "A Place to Belong"; 64. "Mixed Blood"; 65. "First Times"; Special short story: "Phew..."
14	March 25, 2026	978-4-8240-1583-9	March 23, 2027	979-8-89863-909-9
15	September 20, 2026	978-4-8240-1860-1	—	—

=== Anime ===
An anime television series adaptation was announced during the first livestream for the "10th Anniversary Memorial Overlap Bunko All-Star Assemble Special" event on October 15, 2023. It is produced by J.C.Staff and directed by Yoshiaki Iwasaki, with scripts written by Megumi Shimizu, character designs handled by Sōta Suwa, and music composed by Kujira Yumemi. The series aired from April 8, 2024, to June 24, 2024, on AT-X and other networks. The opening theme is "Danna-sama to no Love-Love Love Song" (旦那様とのラブラブ・ラブソング; lit. "Lovey-Dovey Love Song with My Husband"), performed by Rie Kugimiya as her character Fenrys / Rhys, while the ending theme is "Utopia Gaku-Gairon" (ユートピア学概論; lit. "Introduction to Utopian Studies"), performed by Dialogue+. Crunchyroll streamed the series worldwide except East Asia. Muse Communication licensed the series in South and Southeast Asia.

A second season was announced during the "Great Overlap Bunko All-Star Gathering Special 2026" second livestream on July 4, 2026.

==== Episodes ====
No.	Title (Note: All English titles are taken from Crunchyroll.)	Directed by (Note: Information is taken from the ending credits of each episode.)	Written by	Storyboarded by	Original release date
1	"A Level 2 Hero Candidate"; Transliteration: "Lv2 no Yūsha Kōho" (Japanese: Lv2の勇者候補)	Miyuki Ishida, Shizuka Izumi	Megumi Shimizu	Yoshiaki Iwasaki	April 8, 2024
Merchant Banaza is transported away to the Kingdom of Klyrode to be the "hero". Both he and the Blonde Hero, another man summoned simultaneously, are assessed. Whilst everyone is fascinated over the Hero's high stats, Banaza has low stats and seemingly no Divine Ability. He also cannot return home as the ritual is the only way to go back. To get rid of him, The King sends Banaza to the Delaveza forest near the Demon Lords Territory. Whilst trying to figure out his abilities, Banaza kills a slime and levels up, making him very powerful. After accidentally casting the high level Purification magic over the entire forest, after gaining infinite power at the highest rank, he alters his appearance and teleports back to the city to join the Adventurers Guild under the name Flio. He offers to help a young girl get to the Forest using his teleport magic, unaware that such ability is rare. Four female soldiers join them to witness his magic after being skeptical of him. When they arrive, the soldiers attack the girl, who they suspect is a Dark Army spy. The girl confirms this by transforming into a Fenrir and attacking them.
2	"Fenrys the Lupine Warrior"; Transliteration: "Garō-zoku no Senshi Fenrīsu" (Japanese: 牙狼族の戦士フェンリース)	Kazuya Fujiwara	Megumi Shimizu	Hiroaki Yoshikawa	April 15, 2024
Seeing the female soldiers greatly outmatched, Flio teleports them away and uses gravity magic to force the Fenrir to surrender. She then reverts to an older human form. Identifying herself as a Fenrys, she attaches herself to him calling him "Master", but he gets her to call him 'Darling' instead by claiming they are married, as her tribe's rule is to submit to the strongest. Meanwhile, the Blonde Hero is revealed to be a showboat and coward after getting many soldiers killed by Psychobears, but the king is still nevertheless supportive of him. Flio and Rys buy a house and soon rescue the same four soldiers from earlier, who are struggling against Psychobears. They manage to tame the surviving Psychobear and turn it into a rabbit-like creature. The four soldiers introduce themselves as Balirossa, Blossom, Belano and Byleri and request for him to help train them and for them to stay at his house for the time being. He agrees and introduces Rys as his wife so to calm her rage. Meanwhile, the Dark Lord learns of Flio's actions and sends his minion Uliminas to capture him.
3	"I've Begun My Life in Another World"; Transliteration: "Isekai Raifu Hajimemashita" (Japanese: 異世界ライフはじめました)	Daisuke Kurose	Megumi Shimizu	Daisuke Kurose	April 22, 2024
Flio begins to train the knights as they struggle to defeat simple monsters. Meanwhile, Rys secretly begins taking cooking classes after being introduced to cooked foods instead of raw. She also becomes wary and protective after realizing that the girls are trying to get closer to Flio by feigning injury. The King and Hero learn of Flio's talents of defeating monsters and summon him to join the battle, but he refuses as he doesn't want to fight. He later starts a farm and has the four soldiers help with his work. Rys later catches Uliminas snooping and over tea. She tries to recruit Flio, who unwittingly reveals that he cast the Purification Magic over the forest, which resulted in the destruction of hordes of Dark Soldiers, including Rys' brother Fengaryl. They later tell the girls the truth about themselves. Uliminas then challenges Flio, but loses. She returns with an army of Dragons, intending to force Flio to join the Dark Army, but he defeats them all in one move, forcing Uliminas to retreat. The Dark Lord then decides to visit Flio himself.
4	"An Unexpected Visitor"; Transliteration: "Yokisenu Raishōsha" (Japanese: 予期せぬ来訪者)	Shigenori Awai	Megumi Shimizu	Ōhata Kiyotaka	April 29, 2024
Both the Dark Lord Gholl and the King are wary of Flio's refusal to join their war, each believing he serves the other. Though Princess Elizabeth, the King's daughter, wants to talk to him, her father denies her request and sends the Blonde Hero to force Flio into joining his army. Gholl decides to visit Rys using the name Ghozal (though he is instantly called out as the Dark One) to meet Flio. Flio is undeterred by his power and explains that he is refusing to fight for either side. Ghozal takes a liking to Flio and begins visiting the house daily. The Hero brings an army to force Flio to join the war. Despite this threat, Flio still declines. Balirossa, Blossom, Belano and Byleri defect from the kingdom's forces and stand by Rys and Flio, who teleports himself, the girls, the house, and the fields far away. Gholl arrives and, after realizing that Flio's gone, orders his army to attack the Hero's, forcing him to retreat. Having relocated to the west, Flio decides to become a merchant selling items made of the monsters he defeated.
5	"Until My Life Ends"; Transliteration: "Kono Inochi Tsukiru Made" (Japanese: この命尽きるまで)	Miyuki Ishida, Shizuka Izumi	Megumi Shimizu	Miyuki Ishida	May 6, 2024
Gholl's army begins charging its way from the Northern Forest to the kingdom. The Blonde Hero is unwilling to join the fight and has locked himself in his room following his failed attempt to force Flio to join the war. The Royal Mages cast a Purification Defense Barrier to slow Gholl's army down. However, it results in them all becoming comatose, including the king, putting Elizabeth, in charge; her first order being to banish the Hero for his incompetence. His slave Tsuya accompanies him, as she still is loyal to him. He is guided into breaking the seal on a powerful Djinn who slaughters innocents to grant wishes by drawing a sword, and orders her to kill Flio. The Djinn then places sacrificing collars on the necks of everyone in the castle that will eventually cut off their heads once her wish is fulfilled, intending to use their deaths as payment for her wishes. Elizabeth is then advised to search for the "true hero", who is identified as Flio. Meanwhile, Flio goes on a date with Rys and is confronted by Hiya, the Djinn that the Hero freed. She gravely injures Rys, but her next attack does not hurt Flio. Flio cannot heal Rys with his magic and swears to make Hiya pay.
6	"Hiya, Djinn of Light and Darkness"; Transliteration: "Hikari to Yami no Majin Hiya" (Japanese: 光と闇の魔人ヒヤ)	Teppei Takeya	Megumi Shimizu	Koichi Takada	May 13, 2024
In a feat of uncontrollable rage, Flio mercilessly beats Hiya whilst cancelling her magic with his Infinite Power Levels, rendering her defenseless. His new magic also heals Rys by time manipulation. Rys is infatuated by how ruthlessly Flio is fighting, until she remembers that she fell in love with him because of his kindness and refusal to kill, stopping him from killing Hiya and regaining his senses. Hiya's defeat causes the sacrificing collars to disappear. After Hiya recovers, Rys decides to invite her to live with Flio and she accepts. Whilst Princess Elizabeth, now acting queen, travels west in search of Flio, the Blonde Hero learns of Hiya's failure and unwittingly frees the soul of a Dark Princess of Magic named Damalynas, who transforms him into a monster. Tsuya is then possessed by Damalynas to use as a vessel. During the night, Flio confesses to Rys that he can't live without her and asks her to get married for real, which she accepts and they kiss. However, they are interrupted by Hiya before they can have sex, causing both to yell at her for ruining their moment and Filo bans Hiya from spying if she's gonna live with them.
7	"Toward Their Respective Futures"; Transliteration: "Sorezore no Mirai e" (Japanese: それぞれの未来へ)	Takaaki Ishiyama	Megumi Shimizu	Takaaki Ishiyama	May 20, 2024
Elizabeth continues her search for Flio. Meanwhile, the four female soldiers manage to tame a unicorn-like monster. Damalynas and the transformed Blonde Hero launch an attack on Elizabeth. This alerts Flio and Hiya explains that by freeing her, the seal on Damalynas's soul was also broken. Under orders from Flio, Hiya engages Damalynas and the transformed Blonde Hero, eventually defeating her before extracting and eating her soul, turning the Blonde Hero and Tsuya back to normal. Elizabeth finally meets Flio and requests for him to come to the castle, but he declines as he wants to live a private, peaceful life and does not wish to fight; however, he does give her a large amount of money to help restore her kingdom. The Blonde Hero and Tsuya are arrested and scheduled to be executed.
8	"Unseen Wall"; Transliteration: "Miezaru Kabe" (Japanese: 見えざる壁)	Kazuya Fujiwara	Megumi Shimizu	Hiroaki Yoshikawa	May 27, 2024
Balirossa suffers from nightmares of her marrying the Dark One. Flio learns that an intruder has gotten into the city. Meanwhile, Elizabeth learns that Banaza and Flio are the same person. She later discovers that the Blonde Hero and Tsuya have escaped, and orders the soldiers to hunt them down. The Blonde Hero reveals that he stole a bag of money that he considers as payment for his work, but it does not contain money, only a magical shovel, which they use to escape the guards by digging a deep hole, but they struggle to get out of it due to them digging too deep. Gholl and Uliminas continue their search for Flio while also continuing their war against humans. Gholl later reunites with Flio and decides to get to know humans more. Balirossa begins to develop feelings for Gholl. Meanwhile, Yuigarde, Gholl's brother, is dissatisfied with his brother's actions and, not wanting to include a human in their army, decides to become the new Dark One and eliminate Flio.
9	"Wolf and Adventurer"; Transliteration: "Ōkami to Bōkensha" (Japanese: 狼と冒険者)	Daisuke Kurose	Megumi Shimizu	Daisuke Kurose	June 3, 2024
Rys's cooking skills are improving. Elizabeth apologizes to Flio, calling him "Banaza", for his earlier mistreatment by her father. She also requests his help in protecting the towns from the Dark Army. Elizabeth says that the King will awaken soon and may again try to force Flio to join the war; however, she intends to take over by making him step down. Meanwhile, the Blonde Hero and Tsuya escape the hole. They are eventually captured by Phufun, Yuigarde's subordinate. Flio agrees to help Elizabeth, bringing Rys along. He defends a village from the Dark Army. Dark Army soldiers are confused seeing a Fenrys helping a human. Flio and Rys defeat them, demanding that they retreat, as he wants peace between the humans and demons. Gholl learns that Yuigarde has taken the throne and intends to perform a ritual that will summon an evil god using the Hero and Tsuya as sacrifices. He races back to the castle to put a stop to his brother.
10	"A New Housemate"; Transliteration: "Arata-na Dōkyonin" (Japanese: 新たな同居人)	Shigenori Awai	Megumi Shimizu	Koichi Takada	June 10, 2024
Gholl and Uliminas learn that Yuigarde has become the new Dark One and return to the castle to confront him. The Infernal Four visit Yuigarde along with Uliminas, who opposes the idea of him becoming the new king, but unsuccessfully tries to stop him. She is saved by Gholl. Yuigarde is dissatisfied with his ways of handling the Dark Army. To his surprise, Gholl willingly resigns and allows his brother to take the throne. Yuigarde takes this as a joke and tries to attack him, but is knocked away. He and Uliminas request to stay at Flio's place and he agrees. Although Gholl is able to fit in, Balirossa does not feel comfortable with this at all, but Flio and Rys manage to reason with her and she finally accepts Gholl as their new housemate. Meanwhile, the Blonde Hero and Tsuya have escaped Yuigarde's clutches.
11	"A Steamy Hot Spring Trip, Part 1"; Transliteration: "Yukemuri Onsen Ryokō Zen-pen" (Japanese: 湯けむり温泉旅行・前編)	Miyuki Ishida; Shizuka Izumi	Megumi Shimizu	Miyuki Ishida	June 17, 2024
Yuigarde tries to figure out a way to defeat the human army, who has the advantage over them. Meanwhile, Flio and Rys decide to take a trip to the hot springs with everyone; however, Yuigarde and Phufun also attend the hot springs with the intention to boost morale with people. Curious about reproduction, Hiya visits Damalynas, who is now trapped in her pocket dimension, but is quickly kicked out after she tries to have sex with her. The group all attend separate baths. The Blonde Hero and Tsuya also arrive at the hot springs with the intention to sell a diamond that they stole, but it transforms them into a monster that attacks the springs. Flio's group believe that Yuigarde is behind it. As they fight the monster, Gholl faces his brother.
12	"A Steamy Hot Spring Trip, Part 2"; Transliteration: "Yukemuri Onsen Ryokō Gohen" (Japanese: 湯けむり温泉旅行・後編)	Yohei Suzuki, Miyuki Ishida	Megumi Shimizu	Koichi Takada	June 24, 2024
As Gholl and Yuigarde fight, Rys kills the monster, freeing the Blonde Hero and Tsuya. Uliminas faces Phufun and the Infernal Four. The resort owners use emergency magic to restrain Yuigarde and his minions before teleporting them away. As Flio and his friends make repairs to the resort, the Hero and Tsuya run from the angry owners, but are launched by a geyser after trying to dig their way out using the magic shovel. The owners express gratitude for Flio and his friends for their help. Gholl establishes a firm relationship with Flio, hoping that he can make peace between humans and demons. At dinner, Balirossa confesses her feelings for Gholl, making Uliminas jealous. That night, Rys and Flio express their love for each other and they have sex. The next day, the group returns home. Meanwhile, Elizabeth becomes the kingdom's new ruler and learns that her father has escaped after awakening. The Hero is still being hunted and vows to continue his attempt to be recognized as a hero.

=== Game ===
A MMORPG browser game, titled Chillin' in Another World with Level 2 Super Cheat Powers Reverse Dive, was also announced during the same livestream. It will be hosted on the G123 platform and receive a worldwide release.

== Reception ==
By October 2023. the series had over 2 million copies in circulation.
