= Minami Kamakura High School Girls Cycling Club =

Japanese manga and anime series

- Cover of Minami Kamakura Kōkō Joshi Jitensha-Bu volume 1

南鎌倉高校女子自転車部 (Minami Kamakura Kōkō Joshi Jitensha-Bu)
- Genre: Sport (Road bicycle racing)
- Manga
- Written by: Noriyuki Matsumoto
- Published by: Mag Garden
- Magazine: Monthly Comic Blade
- Original run: August 2011 – October 2018
- Volumes: 11
- Anime television series
- Directed by: Susumu Kudo
- Produced by: Hideki Kunigiyama; Jo Kotaki; Takao Asaga; Haruki Ashitate; Keiji Hamada; Eiji Maesaka
- Written by: Kurasumi Sunayama
- Music by: Arte Refact
- Studio: J.C.Staff, A.C.G.T
- Licensed by: Crunchyroll
- Original network: AT-X, TVO, tvk, TVA, RKK
- English network: SEA: Animax Asia
- Original run: January 6, 2017 – March 24, 2017
- Episodes: 12 + OVA

Minami Kamakura High School Girls Cycling Club (南鎌倉高校女子自転車部, Minami Kamakura Kōkō Joshi Jitensha-Bu) is a Japanese manga series by Noriyuki Matsumoto, serialized in Mag Garden's shōnen manga magazine Monthly Comic Blade since August 2011. It has been collected in nine tankōbon volumes. A 13-episode anime television series adaptation by J.C.Staff and A.C.G.T aired between January 6 and May 15, 2017.

== Plot ==
Hiromi Maiharu has moved from Nagasaki to Kamakura and rides a bicycle to school everyday. Then she meets Tomoe Akitsuki, the president of the girls cycling club. She therefore joins the club and her life gradually begins to change.

== Characters ==
Hiromi Maiharu (舞春 ひろみ, Maiharu Hiromi)
Voiced by: Haruka Kudō (drama CD), Reina Ueda (anime)
A first year student from class B at Minami Kamakura Girls High School. Hiromi and her family moved from Nagasaki to Kamakura. She is a cheerful but slightly clumsy girl. At first, she can't ride a bicycle because she had forgotten how to ride it long time ago. But gradually, she learns many things about bicycles and began to gain more interest with it. Later, she begins to love cycling activities and realizes that her bicycle journey made her met so many friends.
Tomoe Akitsuki (秋月 巴, Akizuki Tomoe)
Voiced by: Eriko Matsui (drama CD), Yuuki Hirose (anime)
A first year student from class B at Minami Kamakura Girls High School, the same class as Hiromi. Tomoe is a native from Kamakura and Hiromi's first friend when she first came to Kamakura. She gets along well with Hiromi at their first meeting and helps her to ride a bicycle on the first day of school. She's also the one who guides Hiromi and their teacher, Shiki-sensei, to cycling around the ways of Kamakura. After the Night Criterium event, Tomoe was appointed by all members as a Minami Kamakura High School cycling club's president, which she agrees. She is called Tomo-chan by Hiromi.
Natsumi Higa (比嘉 夏海, Higa Natsumi)
Voiced by: Saori Hayashi (drama CD), Natsumi Fujiwara (anime)
A first year Student from class C at Minami Kamakura Girls High School. Natsumi was originally from Okinawa, but later moved to Kamakura. She is the first member of Minami Kamakura High School cycling club that is seen riding a road bike, even though she is also a beginner like her fellow club members. She is good at sports, especially swimming, that makes seniors of school's swimming club convince her to become their member. She is also good at cooking.
Fuyune Kamikura (神倉 冬音, Kamikura Fuyune)
Voiced by: Saki Nakajima (drama CD), Natsumi Takamori (anime)
A first year student from class D at Minami Kamakura Girls High School. Fuyune is the granddaughter of Minami Kamakura High School's headmaster, and became inspired from her cycling adventures. She has an older sister who is hospitalized and promised her to begin adventures with her own feet. She is still struggling in a climbing road when cycling. She is good at memorizing.
Sandy McDougal (サンディ・マクドゥガル, Sandi Makudugaru)
Voiced by: Satsumi Matsuda (drama CD), Emiko Takeuchi (anime)
A first year student from Class E at Minami Kamakuta Girls High School. Sandy is an American from Colorado who moved to Kamakura to attend high school. She made a cameo appearance in Episode 1, and appears again as Mrs. Bear (クマ さん Kuma-san) in episode 6, participated at cycling event Night Criterium inside a bear costumes. Her actual appearance is in Episode 9, where she became friends with Hiromi and the other girls, also joining the cycling club afterwards. Her close win at the cycling race event in a bear costume proves that she has a strongest physical capabilities among all cycling club members.
Shiki Mori (森 四季, Mori Shiki)
Voiced by: Hitomi Nabatame (drama CD), Sayumi Watabe (anime)
Shiki is a teacher at Minami Kamakura Girls High School and a long time cyclist rider. Later, she becomes the advisor of high school's cycling club. She is a new teacher in the school. Shiki also taught her students about many cycling aspects and techniques which really proves helpful for the cycling club's developments.
Nagisa Mori (森 渚, Mori Nagisa)
Voiced by: Mariko Honda (drama CD), Akari Kitō (anime)
Nagisa is Shiki's younger sister and the owner of bread shop called Bakery Flat. She is also a cyclist and knows some cycling aspects, as shown when she helps Natsumi to repair her bike's tire. Her shop sometimes become a rest area for cyclists.
Tsuru Kotobuki (寿 鶴, Kotobuki Tsuru)
Voiced by: Azumi Asakura (drama CD), Ai Kakuma (anime)
Tsuru is a worker at Bakery Flat. She also often helps Korone in her shop.
Korone Hōōji (鳳凰寺 コロネ, Hōōji Korone)
Voiced by: Satomi Akesaka (drama CD), Yurika Kubo (anime)
Korone is the manager of bicycle shop called Cycle Flat, which is located next to Bakery Flat. People always mistaken her as a child due to her small and child-like appearance, but she is actually an adult and a cyclist that participated in an event at Taiwan.
Ryūko Kamikura (神倉 龍子, Kamikura Ryūko)
Voiced by: Miyuki Ichijo (anime)
Ryuko is the headmaster of Minami Kamakura Girls High School. Long time ago, when she is a high school student, she was a member of Minami Kamakura School's cycling club.
Yuika Akitsuki (秋月 結花, Akizuki Yuika)
Voiced by: Yui Fukuo (anime)
Yuika is Tomoe's younger sister. She design a uniform for Minami Kamakura High School Girl's cycling club.
Hiroko Azuma (東 浩子, Azuma Hiroko)
Voiced by: Ikumi Hayama (anime)
A second year student at Minami Kamakura Girls High School. Hiroko is a member of the school's swim team. Initially miffed at Natsumi, a promising swimmer, choosing to join the newly created cycling club over the swim team, she nonetheless respects the girls, although she's is not above harassing them periodically.
Sabaya-san, Alpaca-san, Tootsie-san (サバヤーさん、アルパカーさん、トツぃーさん, Sabaya-san, Arupaka-san, Totsu-i-san)
Cyclists and customers of Bakery Flat.

== Media ==
=== Manga ===
Minami Kamakura High School Girls Cycling Club, written and illustrated by Noriyuki Matsumoto, ran in Mag Garden's Monthly Comic Blade magazine from August 2011. Mag Garden collected its chapters in eleven tankōbon volumes, released from January 10, 2012.

No.	Release date	ISBN
1	January 10, 2012	978-4-86127-931-7
2	August 10, 2012	978-4-8000-0028-6
3	March 9, 2013	978-4-8000-0104-7
4	October 10, 2013	978-4-8000-0217-4
5	June 3, 2014	978-4-8000-0319-5; 978-4-8000-0316-4 (LE)
6	December 10, 2014	978-4-8000-0382-9; 978-4-8000-0375-1 (LE)
7	August 10, 2015	978-4-8000-0488-8
8	April 9, 2016	978-4-8000-0554-0; 978-4-8000-0553-3 (LE)
9	January 10, 2017	978-4-8000-0643-1; 978-4-8000-0642-4 (LE)
10	November 10, 2017	978-4-8000-0730-8
11	December 10, 2018	978-4-8000-0813-8

=== Anime ===
An anime television series adaptation by J.C.Staff and A.C.G.T aired from January 6, 2017, to March 24, 2017. The opening theme is "Jitensha ni Hana wa Mau" (自転車に花は舞う; lit. 'Flower Dances With Bike'), performed by the idol unit AŌP. The ending theme is "Niji Yume Road" (にじゆめロード), performed by Ika-san (いかさん). Crunchyroll streamed the series. The anime ran for 12 episodes and will be released across four three episode BD/DVD volumes. An original video animation episode had been delayed and was broadcast on May 15, 2017.

No.	Official English title (Note: All English titles are taken from Crunchyroll.) Original Japanese title	Original release date
1	"Entrance Ceremony!" "Nyūgakushiki!" (入学式！)	January 6, 2017
Hiromi Maiharu moves from Nagasaki to Kamakura. She bikes home to attend the entrance ceremony of Minami Kamakura Girls High School. She gets out, but she can't ride a bike for some reason. Meanwhile, she rides her bicycle with Tomoe Akitsuki who she meets by chance. She started practicing.
2	"Go Explore Kamakura!" "Kamakura Tansaku ni Go!" (鎌倉探索にGo!)	January 13, 2017
Hiromi who becomes able to ride a bicycle. She has a bicycle guide through the town of Kamakura with Tomoe. She goes sightseeing with Shiki Mori who joins there. She was doing it, but Hiromi, practicing during the break, gets lost.
3	"Let's Start a Girls Cycling Club!" "Joshi Jitensha-bu, Hajimemasu!" (女子自転車部、はじめます！)	January 20, 2017
Hiromi must join the club at Minami Kamakura Girls High School. Because there is a rule, Hiromi and Tomoe will visit club activities. Hiromi and the others are together in the health room and meet Fuyune Kamikura. After that, they visit the headmaster room and meet Ryūko Kamikura, Fuyune's grandmother. They are listening to the story of the cycling club that existed in the past. Hiromi proposes to make a cycling club.
4	"I Won't Let You Take Natsumi-chan!" "Natsumi-chan wa Watasanai!" (夏海ちゃんはわたさない！)	January 27, 2017
Hiromi, who decides to make a cycling club, has to confirm the members and asks the advisor's teacher, but it will not be. The advisor is Shiki Mori. Shiki Mori is supposed to take over, but one of the members, Natsumi Higa, that Hiromi put in as from the swimming club, will receive a strong solicitation. She plays a bicycle game over Natsumi.
5	"Choosing a Bicycle is Hard?" "Jitensha o Erabu no tte Muzukashii?" (自転車を選ぶのってむずかしい？)	February 3, 2017
The advisor of the cycling club says to achieve some achievement within three months. Otherwise, they will not accept it as a club. The problem comes out and Hiromi, who wants to know everything about cycling, starts by getting the bicycle first.
6	"First Race!" "Hajimete no Rēsu!" (はじめてのレース！)	February 10, 2017
The first step of making achievements proposed by Shiki Mori is a race event called "Night Criterium". A one-kilometre course sets up on the grounds of Minami Kamakura Girls High School. It is a beginner class race with 10 laps. The situation is quite harsh because the club also participates.
7	"What Can I Do?" "Watashi ni Dekiru Koto?" (わたしにできること？)	February 17, 2017
While Night Criterium is approaching the middle stage, it was difficult to catch up with the leading of "Mrs. Bear". Second graders and third graders will follow them. However, Fuyune and Tomoe are near the limit of physical strength. It's getting worse and Natsumi has a severe shoulder pain.
8	"All Together!" "Minna to Issho ni!" (みんなと一緒に！)	February 24, 2017
The final stage of Night Criterium. Hiromi catches up with the leading Mrs. Bear in Tomoe's strategy. Now, Hiromi and Natsumi are on the top. However, the pain on Narumi's shoulder becomes severe and she withdraws. Then, the senior called Hiroko Azuma catches up. The race is between Mrs. Bear, Hiromi and Hiroko.
9	"A Challenge From Mr. Bear?!" "Kumasan kara no Chōsen-jō!?" (クマさんからの挑戦状！？)	March 3, 2017
Orienteering against club activities in the first grade at school events has begun. Everyone enjoys walking around for exploring Kamakura. Suddenly, Mrs. Bear appears in front of Hiromi and the others and her real name is Sandy McDougal. Sandy challenges the game by pointing the challenge letter to Hiromi.
10	"Let's Go On a Trip!" "Rinkō de Ikou!" (輪行で行こう！)	March 10, 2017
Korone is a manager of Night Criterium event. He creates the road for Hiromi. Korone thanks Hiromi and the others in the cycling club. And it will be the story of the cycling club in the future and everyone trying to go touring on Miura Peninsula.
11	"Bicycles Are Strange" "Jitensha tte, Fushigi" (自転車って、ふしぎ)	March 17, 2017
Everyone in the cycling club is touring the national highway on the Miura Peninsula. Overtaken by a female trio on the road, Sandy, who catches fire on it, tries to catch up. Sandy and Natsumi try to catch up with Hiromi, Tomoe and Fuyune.
12	"The Road Keeps Going" "Michi wa Madamada Tsuzuiteru" (道はまだまだつづいてる)	March 24, 2017
In the Miura Peninsula as a club activity, Hiromi submits a touring report to Ryūko Kamikura and recognize it as a formal club. Everyone is approaching to get it. However, Ryūko sees the report and says the club has not yet recognized and Hiromi knows from Shiki Mori that Sandy will return to America.
OVA	"We're In Taiwan!!" "Kita yo, Taiwan!!" (来たよ、台湾!!)	May 15, 2017
Ryūko Kamikura tells the cycling club members that she invites them to make a school trip to Taiwan, so they go to Taiwan for cycling event. As soon as they arrives in Taiwan, Hiromi and Sandy are separated.
