= Time Travel Girl =

Japanese anime television series

タイムトラベル少女～マリ・ワカと8人の科学者たち～ (Taimu Toraberu Shōjo: Mari Waka to 8-nin no Kagakusha-tachi)
- Genre: Science fiction
- Anime television series
- Directed by: Osamu Yamasaki
- Produced by: Aya Yoshino; Masahiro Murakami
- Written by: Osamu Yamasaki
- Music by: Hitomi Kuroishi
- Studio: Wao World
- Licensed by: NA: Crunchyroll
- Original network: TV Tokyo, TVh, TVA, TVO, TVS, TVQ, AT-X
- Original run: July 9, 2016 – September 24, 2016
- Episodes: 12

Time Travel Girl: Mari, Waka, and the Eight Scientists (タイムトラベル少女～マリ・ワカと8人の科学者たち～, Taimu Toraberu Shōjo: Mari Waka to Hachi-nin no Kagakusha-tachi) is an educational anime television series directed by Osamu Yamasaki and produced by WAO World. Based on the 1983 book by Japanese educator Kiyonobu Itakura. The anime aired between July 9, 2016, and September 24, 2016, and was simulcast by Funimation. Later it was confirmed that Crunchyroll added the series alongside Three Leaves, Three Colors and Omamori Himari on their catalog since December 21, 2016.

== Plot ==
Mari Hayase is the daughter of a scientist, Eiji, who vanished three years ago. He left behind a pendant known as the armillary compass. One day, after coming across a mysterious book, the compass glows and sends Mari back in time. Supported by her best friend Waka Mizuki and Waka's brother Shun, Mari travels through time in search of her missing father and along the way meets prominent scientists who changed the way people think about magnets & electricity.

== Characters ==
=== Main characters ===
Mari Hayase (早瀬 真理, Hayase Mari; usually written マリ)
Voiced by: Aki Toyosaki
A second-year 10th-grade student. Daughter of a great pâtissier and a brilliant scientist. While relatively skilled at cooking and tasting, her academic performance is somewhat random (for instance, when a science test question concerning reflection asked how her reflection in a mirror would look, she responded "It looks cute"). Subtle hints she has feelings for Shun. She first slipped into the past by touching a book she stumbled upon in Shun's room which was passed to him by her father. Sometimes, she must change clothes due to skirts being unrefined in the past. She was later captured by Mikage and forced to slip back into the past to find Eiji after finding out about the machine. Her father saves her amid a time paradox but manages to return safely to the future after Shun saves them. She became a scientist in the future, discovering the time machine, following her father's footsteps.
Waka Mizuki (水城 和花, Mizuki Waka; usually written ワカ)
Voiced by: Minako Kotobuki
Mari's second-year classmate and best friend and Shun's younger sister. She has a crush on her classmate, Futa. She is the first person to witness Mari slipping back in time and informs Shun about it. Waka accidentally slipped back into the past along with Mari and was unable to return. She panicked while she was alone in Faraday's era, which is different from how Mari reacted when she first slipped back to the past. Unlike Mari, Waka earns top scores in history and English.
Shun Mizuki (水城 旬, Mizuki Shun)
Voiced by: Ryuichi Kijima
A third-year 12th-grade Waka's older brother who plans to become a doctor. Eiji passed a book to him and Mari stumbled upon it, allowing her first time slip to occur. He found out that in the future, along with Mari, he would become a scientist who discovers the time machine.
Eiji Hayase (早瀬 永司, Hayase Eiji)
Voiced by: Toshiyuki Morikawa
Akira's husband. Mari and Rika's father. A passionate scientific researcher, he tends to become excessively engrossed in his studies and expeditions; the day after his wedding he disappeared for weeks without any contact and hasn't seen or contacted his wife or daughters in three years. Found him to be in most of the past traveled when Mari slipped back. He slightly helped Hertz realize his dream. Eiji discovers in one journey to the past that Mari was captured by Mikage, and tried to save his daughter only to have a time paradox occur in the midst of it.
Futa Ichikawa (市川 風太, Ichikawa Fuuta)
Voiced by: Daiki Yamashita
A member of the soccer team and a classmate of Mari and Waka. Despite being oblivious, Waka has a crush on him.
Jō Mikage (御影 丞, Mikage Jō)
Voiced by: Tomohiro Tsuboi
The main antagonist of the series. A cold-hearted businessman who is interested in the time machine, the "matter transporter", which was stored in the laboratory. He captured Mari, her mother, and the Mizuki siblings inside the lab after discovering the machine in the basement. He forces Mari to return to the past with him in order to locate Eiji, only resulting in himself being trapped in Edison's era due to the occurrence of a time paradox in the final episode. Edison took pity on Mikage when he became a part of Edison's pioneers.

=== Scientists ===
William Gilbert (ウィリアム・ギルバート)
Voiced by: Tōru Ōkawa
Benjamin Franklin (ベンジャミン・フランクリン)
Voiced by: Shinichiro Miki
Alessandro Giuseppe Antonio Anastasio Volta (アレッサンドロ・ジュゼッペ・アントニオ・アナスタージオ・ヴォルタ, usually written; アレキサンドロ・ボルタ)
Voiced by: Daiki Nakamura
Michael Faraday (マイケル・ファラデー)
Voiced by: Showtaro Morikubo
Samuel Finley Breese Morse (サミュエル・フィンリー・ブリース・モールス, usually written; サミュエル モールス)
Voiced by: Kōji Yusa
Alexander Graham Bell (アレクサンダー・グラハム・ベル, usually written; グラハム・ベル)
Voiced by: Tomoaki Maeno
Heinrich Rudolf Hertz (ハインリヒ・ルドルフ・ヘルツ, usually written; ハインリッヒ・ヘルツ)
Voiced by: Akira Ishida
Thomas Alva Edison (トーマス・アルバ・エジソン, usually written; トマス・エジソン)
Voiced by: Wataru Hatano

=== Other characters ===
Akira Hayase (早瀬 晶, Hayase Akira)
Voiced by: Haruka Tomatsu
Eiji's wife and mother of Mari and Rika. She's a professional patissier.
Rika Hayase (早瀬 理香, Hayase Rika; usually written リカ)
Voiced by: Yui Fukuo
Mari's younger sister.
Rei Mizuki (水城 麗, Mizuki Rei)
Voiced by: Kikuko Inoue
Shun and Waka's mother.
Satsuki Kuroki (黒木 さつき, Kuroki Satsuki)
Voiced by: Ayahi Takagaki
Mikage's assistant.

== Media ==
=== Anime ===
A 12 episode anime television series aired between July 9, 2016, and September 24, 2016, on TV Tokyo. Funimation have licensed the anime for streaming. The series' opening theme is "Kibō Traveler" (希望TRAVELER; "Hope Traveler") by AŌP while the ending theme is "Miss Rabbit" (ミス・ラビット, Misu Rabitto) by Erabareshi.

==== Episode list ====
No.	Official English title (Note: All English titles are taken from Funimation.)	Original release date
1	"Gilbert the Sage" "Kenjanaru Girubāto" (賢者なるギルバート)	July 9, 2016
2	"Sorrowful Gilbert" "Kanashimi no Girubāto" (悲しみのギルバート)	July 16, 2016
3	"Franklin's Spirit of Defiance" "Hankotsu no Furankurin" (反骨のフランクリン)	July 23, 2016
4	"Volta on the Battlefield" "Senjō no Boruta" (戦場のボルタ)	July 30, 2016
5	"Disheartened Faraday" "Faradē no Yūutsu" (ファラデーの憂鬱)	August 6, 2016
6	"Faraday's Resolve" "Faradē no Kakugo" (ファラデーの覚悟)	August 13, 2016
7	"Morse's Inspiration" "Mōrusu no Hirameki" (モールスの閃き)	August 20, 2016
8	"Bell's Decision" "Beru no Ketsudan" (ベルの決断)	August 27, 2016
9	"Bell's Responses" "Koōsuru Beru" (呼応するベル)	September 3, 2016
10	"Hertz's Pride" "Herutsu no Hokori" (ヘルツの誇り)	September 10, 2016
11	"Edison's Resilience" "Fukutsu no Ejison" (不屈のエジソン)	September 17, 2016
12	"Cherished Scientists" "Shin'ainaru Kagaku-sha-tachi" (親愛なる科学者たち)	September 24, 2016
