= List of Shirobako episodes =

Cover art of the first Blu-ray Disc compilation released, featuring main character Aoi Miyamori

Shirobako is an anime television series produced by Warner Entertainment Japan and P.A. Works, and directed by Tsutomu Mizushima. The series follows a group of five girls and best friends, Aoi Miyamori, Ema Yasuhara, Shizuka Sakaki, Misa Tōdō, and Midori Imai, who all begin working in the anime industry after their experiences in the animation club of their high school, only to be faced with the daily troubles and hardships the five must overcome. The focus is primarily on Aoi and her fellow staff at animation studio Musashino Animation as they work on two anime television series.

The series was broadcast in Japan on Tokyo MX from October 9, 2014, to March 26, 2015. Original video animation (OVA) episodes are included on the series' third and seventh Blu-ray Disc/DVD volumes, released on February 25, 2015, and July 29, 2015, respectively. Sentai Filmworks has licensed the series for release in North America, with Crunchyroll simulcasting the series.

Eight pieces of theme music are used for the series. For the first twelve episodes, the opening theme is "Colorful Box" performed by Yoko Ishida, while the ending theme is "Animetic Love Letter" sung by Juri Kimura, Haruka Yoshimura, and Haruka Chisuga. For episode one, the opening theme is "I'm Sorry Exodus" (あいむそーりーEXODUS, Aimu Sōrī Ekusodasu) sung by Tracy (Mai Nakahara, Shizuka Itō, and Ai Kayano), which is later used as the opening theme for the first OVA episode. For episodes 13 onwards, the second opening theme is "Takarabako (Treasure Box)" (宝箱-TREASURE BOX-) performed by Masami Okui, while the second ending theme is "Platinum Jet" (プラチナジェット, Purachina Jetto) performed by Donuts Quintet (Juri Kimura, Haruka Yoshimura, Haruka Chisuga, Asami Takano, and Hitomi Ōwada). The third and final ending theme for episode 19 is "Yama Harinezumi Andes Chucky" (山はりねずみアンデスチャッキー, Yama Harinezumi Andesu Chakkī; "Mountain Hedgehog Andes Chucky") by Miyuki Kunitake. The ending theme for the first OVA episode is "C Melo kara Ai o Komete" (Cメロから愛を込めて) by Mai Nakahara. For the second OVA episode, the opening theme is "Alice in Blue" (アリス・イン・ブルー) and the ending theme is "Angel Fly"; both songs are performed by Rita.

== Episode list ==
No.	Title	Original release date
1	"Exodus To Tomorrow!"; Transliteration: "Ashita ni Mukatte, Ekusodasu!" (Japanese: 明日に向かって、えくそだすっ!)	October 9, 2014
In high school, animation club members Aoi Miyamori, Ema Yasuhara, Shizuka Sakaki, Misa Tōdō, and Midori Imai promise to make an animated feature together one day. Two and a half years later, Aoi works as a production assistant at Musashino Animation, the animation studio behind Exodus!, an upcoming anime. She visits Misato Segawa, the animation supervisor for its fourth episode, to retrieve the checked animation. Then, she drives to the studio and attends a meeting as the crew (including Ema, who is a key animator) watches Exodus!'s premiere, which is met with a lukewarm public response, to everyone's relief. Later on, while previewing the third episode, the crew finds Tarō Takanashi, another production assistant, could not finish the key frames in time, thus leaving the quality of the animation erratic. With no other key animators available to finish the frames, the crew turns to Segawa, who reluctantly takes the extra job at the request of that episode's animation supervisor Ryōsuke Endō, her rival. Once the frames are finished, Aoi retrieves them before taking the animation director, Hironori Madoka, to a dubbing session. She then stops by Segawa's house and finds her lying on the floor unconscious.
2	"Arupin is Here!"; Transliteration: "Arupin wa Imasu!" (Japanese: あるぴんはいます!)	October 16, 2014
After tending to Segawa, who collapsed due to dizziness from a fever, Aoi gets Ryōsuke to handle the key frames for episode four. As the production process continues, Ema calls Shizuka, now a restaurant employee and a rookie voice actress. The two make plans for the group's monthly get-together event. Ema reveals she is interacting less at work with Aoi, who seems to have an overwhelming workload, being responsible for the production of two episodes. During the sound design process of a later episode, the director, Seiichi Kinoshita, becomes dissatisfied with the design of a character. He suggests making changes based on his vision of the character, which involves ideas not previously incorporated during production. Hironori resists this, since it would require the staff to redo the key-frame animation for an entire scene. A previous anime directed by Seiichi, Jiggly Jiggly Heaven, had become the subject of widespread ridicule because of this same situation. Unsure of which side to take, Aoi suggests they hold a meeting with the rest of the staff to determine the personalities and back-stories of the main characters. After some debate, the group agrees to make the changes.
3	"No More Recap Episodes"; Transliteration: "Sōshūhen wa Mō Iya da" (Japanese: 総集編はもういやだ)	October 23, 2014
General animation supervisory assistant Yumi Iguchi is impressed by the new iteration of the fourth episode and begins work on the retakes. Aoi is faced with a heavy workload regarding the fourth and ninth episodes. She delivers her key frames for the ninth to director Masashi Yamada, who instructs her to wake him up early so he can check the key frames have not arrived yet. Doing so, Aoi is instructed to give them to general animation supervisor Rinko Ogasawara. After Rinko checks the key frames, Aoi sends them to in-between inspector Chiemi Dōmoto. Realizing she mistakenly sent a cut to the camera department, Aoi retrieves it. She then discovers a key frame she requested has not been delivered to her and calls freelance key animator Mitsuhide Kisa to finish the cuts. The process is delayed due to his laziness. After he finishes, his key frame is delivered late due to the truck being held back in roadworks. The day before episode four is due to air, a problem with the studio's server results in the delivery of an external studio's color shots getting delayed. Aoi panics, but is comforted by fellow production assistant Erika Yano. The staff pulls together, and episode four is delivered on time, with the retakes being well received.
4	"I Totally Messed Up"; Transliteration: "Watasha Shippai Koichimatte sa" (Japanese: 私ゃ失敗こいちまってさ)	October 30, 2014
On her first audition at Prussia Studio, a nervous Shizuka goes up against popular voice actress Rina Sōma and ends up impressing the director. Aoi's father and mother are impressed with her work on Exodus!, and the latter calls to congratulate her. Years before, Aoi, Ema, Shizuka, Misa and Midori presented their club's anime in high school; although the students were unimpressed by it, the five friends still felt pride. The next day, Aoi, Ema, and Shizuka meet up with Misa, now a computer graphics operator, and Midori, a college student and aspiring scriptwriter. The five go out together. Feeling she did not do well on her audition, Shizuka laments having not done anything significant in her work. Later, Aoi receives a call from Tarō, who asks for her help. When he goes off-topic, however, she hangs up. Riding the train home with Ema, Aoi remarks she does not have a concrete anime-related goal in mind. She later receives a call from Tarō, who again tries asking for help, to no avail. The next day, Seiichi is behind on storyboards and Ryōsuke decides to drop out of directing the eighth episode following an argument with Tarō.
5	"Those Who Blame Others Should Just Quit!"; Transliteration: "Hito no Sei ni Shiteiru yōna Yatsu wa Yamechimae!" (Japanese: 人のせいにしているようなヤツは辞めちまえ!)	November 6, 2014
Angered, Tarō blames Aoi for Ryōsuke's departure, as the argument was the reason behind the phone calls. He got caught up between Ryōsuke, who wanted to do the key frames for an explosion, and 3D director Yūichirō Shimoyanagi, who already prepared a CGI explosion. Believing people were favoring 3D over 2D, primarily because Tarō miscommunicated everything with his own interpretations of what everyone said, Ryōsuke dropped out. With the storyboards for the final episode being a month behind schedule, chief production assistant Yutaka Honda locks Seiichi inside a cage to get him to finish them. Caving under the pressure of his new work environment, Seiichi recounts how his once successful career took a downfall after the release of Jiggly Jiggly Heaven. Exodus! is his first official anime in six years. Whilst having a drink, Ryōsuke learns that animator Saburou Kitano teaches 3D animators, stating it is not about whether 3D is better or not, but rather how it can improve the anime. 3D's increasing influence in anime's production is why Misa chose her career path. The next day, Aoi learns the beginning of episode nine, which follows on from the 3D-rendered explosion in episode eight, had been finished using key animation.
6	"Idepon Miyamori: On the Move"; Transliteration: "Idepon Miyamori Hatsudō-hen" (Japanese: イデポン宮森 発動篇)	November 13, 2014
Agitated by Tarō's attitude, Aoi informs Honda of his failure to handle the situation between Ryōsuke and Yūichirō. Honda decides to tell Seiichi about the situation as well, but discovers he escaped his confinement to sneak into the after-recording session. Meanwhile, line producer Houjou Hiroaki offers his friend, production assistant Tatsuya Ochiai, to work at another studio. However, Tatsuya turns down the offer. Aoi and Erika discuss the possibility of hand-drawn animation being phased out by 3D animation completely. Aoi then hears from Misa about how, even as a 3D creator, she needed to study hand-drawn animation to get an artistic sense. Meanwhile, Shizuka is visited by her old mentor, Mari Tateo, who invites her to a play recital and teaches her to make use of the time between auditions. Seiichi decides to return and finish his work. Learning that Ryōsuke was inspired by an Idepon anime to become an animator, Aoi invites him to an exhibit on that show. There, they run into Tarō and Yūichirō. The exhibition helps Ryōsuke and Yūichirō get over their feud and encourages Ryōsuke to get the cuts done. Afterwards, Ryōsuke praises Yūichirō on his CG explosion and asks to dabble in 3D. Yūichirō asks Ryōsuke to take a look at some of his 3D motions and give a key animator's opinion. Aoi celebrates the finishing of the cuts. Tarō, Erika and Tatsuya credit that success to her.
7	"Retake with the Cat"; Transliteration: "Neko de Riteiku" (Japanese: ネコでリテイク)	November 20, 2014
Learning her sister Kaori is coming to visit, Aoi entrusts her house key to Midori. During an assembly, Tatsuya announces he is leaving at the end of the week, citing personal reasons. He secretly has accepted the offer to join the other studio, Studio Canaan. Honda reassigns Erika to continue Tatsuya's work on the eleventh episode, which leaves Tarō to continue her work on the twelfth episode. Aoi is put in charge of work on the final episode, which Tatsuya recommends as a good advancement for her experience. Masashi Yamada, the animation director for the fourth episode, advises Aoi to be on Seiichi's case, since his storyboards are not done. Meanwhile, Ema is troubled by cuts involving a cat, being worried about balancing speed and quality. Senior key animator Shigeru Sugie tries giving her advice, but Ema ends up feeling more conflicted. As a result, she chooses to work late instead of meeting her friends. The next day, Aoi learns the four cuts Ema handed in the previous day need to be redone as they were too rushed. This shocks Ema, who feels that doing them carefully would take too long and that she will never become a great animator. Aoi tries to cheer her up. However, when Ema asks her what she herself wants to do in her future, Aoi replies she does not know. Ema remains heartbroken.
8	"I'm Not Blaming You"; Transliteration: "Semeterun Janai Kara ne" (Japanese: 責めてるんじゃないからね)	November 27, 2014
Before resuming work, Ema encounters Yumi. She notices Ema's sadness and advises her to ask for help. Midori and Kaori go on a tour across Tokyo. Kaori is fascinated with the city, as her office life in the country is dull. Sugie keeps trying to motivate Ema, who does not feel capable of following his suggestions. Meanwhile, Aoi laments feeling like she is the only one without a future in mind. Aoi delivers Kisa's cuts to Segawa, who is concerned about Ema's work. When Ema begins to stress out over her cuts, Yumi takes her on a walk. At a café, Midori tells Kaori about her ambition to write a story. Yumi brings Ema to a park to clear her head. Sugie and Rinko also go there for similar purposes. Yumi encourages Ema to learn from copying previous works in order to develop her own style. A cat they encounter later gives Ema ideas of how to animate cat movement. During a meet-up at Shizuka's workplace, Midori reminds Aoi of the promise the girls made to collaborate on an anime some day. The next day, Kaori returns home, determined to do her best too.
9	"What Do You Think I Was Trying to Say?"; Transliteration: "Nani o Tsutaetakattan da to Omou?" (Japanese: 何を伝えたかったんだと思う?)	December 4, 2014
Aoi is put under pressure as Seiichi has yet to finish his storyboards. There is only one month for the episode's material to be delivered. The studio's president Masato Marukawa, line producer Shun Watanabe, and record producer Gōtarō Katsuragi decide to have the company work on an anime adaptation of The Third Aerial Girls Squad, a popular book. Misa becomes downhearted since all she gets to do at her company, Super Media Creations, is model CG wheels. Shizuka lands a walla role in an anime, but ends up having to hold back her enthusiasm during the recording, much to her dissatisfaction. The next day, Misa asks her company's president, Kouichi Tateishi, if she can work on something other than cars in the future, telling him about her promise to her friends. He advises her to imagine herself in the future first, so she will have an idea on how to reach her goal. Meanwhile, Seiichi wants to change the ending, so he and Honda meet up with writer Shimeji Maitake, who helps reignite Seiichi's imagination. Seiichi comes up with a better ending. However, news of these changes puts additional pressure on Aoi, who has to put them into motion.
10	"Just One More"; Transliteration: "Ato Ippai dake ne" (Japanese: あと一杯だけね)	December 11, 2014
During the morning assembly, Honda announces Seiichi will finish his storyboards tomorrow, which still leaves the studio with only five weeks to deliver the final episode, compared to the average two months spent on each of the previous episodes. Wanting to help with Aoi's workload, Midori sends her an email containing research about diesel trains. At Sawara Studio's sound department, Aoi is forced to help sound effects engineer Toshiyasu Kawano in creating sounds for another anime. The process intrigues her. Later, when Misa contemplates quitting her job, Aoi advises her to figure out where she wants to go before worrying about how to get there. The next morning, Misa quits, wanting to pursue the kind of story-based animation which got her into CG production. Meanwhile, Seiichi finishes the storyboards. Aoi asks Yūichirō about CG companies Misa could work for. Meanwhile, Honda announces his intention to quit and become a pâtissier. Segawa congratulates Ema for her work on her cuts, to the latter's relief. Work begins on the final episode, although Aoi grows concerned when Seiichi starts drinking during a party.
11	"The Little Key Frames Girl"; Transliteration: "Genga Uri no Shōjo" (Japanese: 原画売りの少女)	December 18, 2014
With thirty cuts to work on, Aoi assigns scenes to key animators, including Ema at the request of Yumi. With not enough animators at Musashino, Aoi struggles to find people available outside of the company. She contemplates hiring amateurs, but Erika warns her that by doing so, the quality will fluctuate, and the schedule will be further delayed due to the director and the animation supervisor having to fix the cuts. Aoi is forced to go to The Born, a studio she previously applied for but was rejected for not having a clear idea of what she wanted to do at the time. There, she meets potential candidate Onodera, only to learn that he has moved on to become a director. The next day, Aoi and Tarō are brought on to help interview candidates applying to Musashino. Meanwhile, Erika learns her father has been hospitalized and overworks herself to try to not think about it. Eventually, Tarō drives her back home. Pushed further to find animators with Erika out of action, Aoi approaches Watanabe for recommendations as he plays mahjong with other industry members. Someone there jokingly suggests finding high-profile animator Mitsuaki Kanno. Aoi decides to look for him.
12	"Exodus Christmas"; Transliteration: "Ekusodasu Kurisumasu" (Japanese: えくそだす·クリスマス)	December 25, 2014
Aoi meets Kanno, who, after reading the storyboards, points out the ridiculous nature of animating horses for the ending, as there are few animators left doing that. However, he says Musashino's animator Sugie, who everyone at the studio assumed was not suitable for Exodus! and therefore assigned him to another anime, can handle the scene. The next night, at a meeting, Watanabe suggests altering the scene to facilitate the work for the key animators. Seiichi and Honda protest, stating the alterations suggested would ruin the episode's tension. Aoi relays Kanno's message about Sugie. With the others' approval, Sugie to takes the job and works out a method that will get the cuts done quickly with help from other animators. Ema is now inspired to draw like he does. Erika returns to work, her family dilemma having been resolved. Sugie later announces his intention to begin a workshop for key animation at Musashino. The delivery day arrives, and everyone works up to get the episode delivered on time. When it airs, most of the staff goes out to celebrate. However, Sugie does not join them, citing he has to return home. Watanabe arrives late, bringing with him a disc titled "White Box", which is a present for Aoi. The disc is played, and everyone begins a countdown.
13	"What Kind of Cloud Do You Like?"; Transliteration: "Suki na Kumo tte Nan desu ka?" (Japanese: 好きな雲って何ですか?)	January 8, 2015
At the start of the new year, it is announced Musashino Animation's next project will be an adaptation of The Third Aerial Girls Squad. With Honda having just left Musashino and Erika still checking on her hospitalized father, Watanabe assigns Aoi to production manager and Tarō to chief production assistant. Faced with numerous responsibilities and a tough schedule, Aoi first starts making sure Seiichi has a clear idea of what he wants to do with the project without making any last-minute changes as he did in Exodus!. When the two ask Rinko to be the series' character designer, she declines the offer, as she wants to improve her basic animating skills following her experiences animating Exodus!'s final episode. She then recommends Yumi to take her place. Yumi reluctantly takes the job. Aoi and Seiichi then convince art director Yūji Atsumi to join them. While trying to research on fighter jets for inspiration, Aoi meets up with Midori, who offers to do the research for her and write up an overview of the information. Shizuka learns she will audition for the anime, while Yumi and Ema receive advice from Rinko about the ethics of character design. Elsewhere, Seiichi, Watanabe, Katsuragi, and Shimeji meet with the publisher, but their meeting is finished quickly when the editor Shinsuke Chazawa approves everything without the author present. Later, as Aoi, Seiichi, and Shimeji do research, they ask Aoi to have Midori commit to her research on fighter jets while discussing how to go about the ending.
14	"The Ruthless Audition Meeting"; Transliteration: "Jinginaki Ōdishon Kaigi!" (Japanese: 仁義なきオーディション会議!)	January 15, 2015
Shizuka shows up for the show's auditions. After reading for one part, she is asked to read for the role of another character. Aoi and Seiichi again meet up with Yūji, who agrees to help out with the project. A new production assistant, Daisuke Hiraoka, later joins the team too. Seiichi participates in a meeting deciding on the cast, with members arguing over aspects outside of voice acting and trying to push their own personal choices regarding who should voice the main character. The matter is settled by sound producer Yoshikazu Inanami, while Chazawa arrives late and approves of the most popular vote. When it comes to deciding the final character, Shizuka is considered as a possibility by Seiichi, but the staff ends up deciding to select someone with more experience. The next day, the team is impressed by Midori's research, and Marukawa and Watanabe hire her as a setting instructor. Misa helps out with the CG animation through the company she now works at. When Shizuka reveals she auditioned for the same series but was rejected, the others feel guilty, but she bravely declares her intention to not give up. Midori and the others, moved, express their admiration for her. Later, Aoi is sent to negotiate with a secondary animation studio, Studio Taitanic, to help out with the project, with some help from Daisuke and Honda.
15	"Will These Drawings Work?"; Transliteration: "Konna E de Iin desu ka?" (Japanese: こんな絵でいいんですか？)	January 22, 2015
A welcoming party is held for two new production assistants, Tsubaki Andō and Sara Satō, while Marukawa announces Musashino Animation's reputation depends on the execution of the new show. Tsubaki and Sara join the staff as they engage in a meeting discussing the anime's ending, then a location hunting trip. Seiichi finishes the storyboards for the first episode, albeit with some dubious drawing quality. Production begins on the episode, with key animator Ai Kunogi participating in her first production meeting, where she is assigned to animate a scene. Meanwhile, Tsubaki and Satou go with Tarō to pick up key frames from Kisa and Segawa before attending more meetings. Aoi and Yūichirō visit Studio Kanabun, Misa's new workplace, where the latter convinces the president, Nobuaki Nakagaichi, to take some of the CG cuts. Aoi assigns Sara and Tsubaki to the production of episodes three and four, respectively. Just as production seems to be going well, Watanabe informs Aoi they need to stop production when the author of the original manga, Takezou Nogame, demanded retakes for the character designs, meaning they must start everything from scratch.
16	"Table Flip"; Transliteration: "Chabudai Gaeshi" (Japanese: ちゃぶだい返し)	January 29, 2015
Aoi instructs everyone to stop production, despite there being only three months until the first episode airs. Yumi begins revising the character designs based on Nogame's feedback emails. She struggles after Nogame voices his disapproval of the redesigns and gives out more vague feedback. With a meeting with Nogame impossible, Watanabe advises they should start from the beginning, without anything to go on. After Aoi speaks with Yumi at in the park, she and Seiichi focus on the unaffected material outside of the characters, such as the 3D and backgrounds. As Yumi continues to struggle with the character design revisions, Rinko tells Seiichi and Watanabe they are not giving her enough support before taking Yumi, Aoi, and Ema to a batting center to let out their stress. She then tells them about her own struggles at getting a character design approved, her current "goth-loli" persona being the result of trying to understand her character. With Rinko's help, Yumi dons her own "armor" and comes out with an improved character design. Meanwhile, Watanabe and Katsuragi track down Chazawa and force him to get Nogame's approval, allowing production to resume.
17	"Where Am I..."; Transliteration: "Watashi Doko ni Irun deshō ka..." (Japanese: 私どこにいるんでしょうか...)	February 5, 2015
The anime's announcement is met with skepticism from the otaku community. Honda pays a visit to the studio to share cakes and catch up with everyone, surprising the staff with his drastic weight loss. Aoi and Seiichi hold an art meeting with Yūji and decide to hire another art director, Masahiro Ōkura, to handle the background scenes. The studio is pushed by Chazawa to create a promotional video in two weeks for a Manga Festival event, meaning certain cuts need to be animated quickly. Sugie notes to Ema her close relationship with Ai. Shizuka fills in at a children's stage play when an actor goes missing, managing to handle both movement and voice acting at the same time. As production on the promotional video continues, Aoi scolds Hiraoka for his frequent tardiness. Then, she is forced to aid Tsubaki and Sara after both get lost collecting key frames. After guiding them back to Musashino, Aoi comforts them by sharing her own experiences as a new production assistant. The studio gets the promotional video finished on time and screen it at a party.
18	"You Set Me Up!"; Transliteration: "Ore o Hameyagatta na!" (Japanese: 俺をはめやがったな!)	February 12, 2015
Aoi, Seiichi and Katsuragi join Inanami as they meet up with the voice cast. During a recording session, the staff notices the protagonist's voice actress, newcomer Kyōko Suzuki, is struggling with maintaining the quality of her voice. They help her give a more natural performance. Afterwards, Aoi meets up with Ōkura at a bar to ask for his help with a particular background; exhausted and drunk, he agrees to do it. Aoi then contacts Studio Taitanic about the layouts of the fifth episode, only to learn they are halfway done despite having not been sent over to Musashino. When Aoi and Yuuji visit Ōkura the next day, he turns down the offer, having forgotten about his meeting with Aoi and being disillusioned with the use of 3D animation over 2D animation. However, he changes his mind when Aoi relays a message from Marukawa about his pleasure of working with him. Musashino receives the layouts for the fifth episode, but the staff is forced to have a meeting with Studio Taitanic's Zaruyoshi Yakushiji, the episode director, over errors in the layouts he let slip by. He begrudgingly agrees to check the errors, but insults Seiichi while leaving. Aoi later learns Yakushiji quit the job. Looking for a replacement director, she begins to stress out until Erika makes a surprise return to the studio.
19	"Did You Catch Any?"; Transliteration: "Tsuremasu ka?" (Japanese: 釣れますか?)	February 19, 2015
Aoi pleads with Erika to take her job as production desk and blames herself for the show's problems. Erika advises Aoi to get some rest. The next day, as the production desk discuss how to handle the issues with Studio Taitanic, Erika goes with Hiraoka, a former acquaintance of hers, over to Taitanic's office to help out with the fifth episode. Eventually, she selects Hiroshi Iketani as Yakushiji's replacement. Meanwhile, Marukawa takes Aoi to the offices of the bankrupt Musashino Pictures studio, which produced Aoi's favorite anime Andes Chucky, much to her own surprise. Marukawa recounts how both he and Ōkura worked on Andes Chucky alongside Sugie. One day, Marukawa and Ōkura introduced their own background for a blizzard scene, which was nearly rejected by Musashino Pictures' higher staff since they were still rookies. Aoi then watches a leftover scene from Andes Chucky, which inspires her to keep having fun while she makes a better anime. As Musashino gets Iketani up to speed with the episode production, Aoi pays a visit to Ōkura and becomes amazed by his finished background.
20	"I'll Do My Best, Mustang!"; Transliteration: "Ganbari-Masutangu!" (Japanese: がんばりマスタング!)	February 26, 2015
As the head staff tries to discuss what to do for the plot of the thirteenth episode, they start to liken the protagonist's reason for flying to their own reasons for getting into the anime industry. They become interested by their motives for making anime and ask the rest of the staff for their own. Midori, who has been given writing assignments by Maitake to improve her skills, feels downhearted when an irritable Hiraoka implies she can get her way just because she is a woman. Maitake later assures Midori his reasons for giving her the assignments were work-related. After the production staff comes up with a scenario for Maitake to work on, Hiraoka gets into an argument with episode director Hironori Madoka, who feels the key animators from Studio Taitanic have been of poor quality. After calming Marukawa down, Hiraoka and Madoka apologize to each other for their respective actions. Hiraoka is dissatisfied with current anime, such as The Third Aerial Girls Squad, citing no one truly cares about the quality of key animation, as long as there are characters to observe. Ai overhears him and disagrees. She visits Ema while she is sick and advises her to remain confident in herself. The next day, Aoi assigns Hiraoka and Tarō to oversee production on the twelfth episode. Meanwhile, Seiichi and Maitake use the previous day's fight as inspiration for how to improve a scenario for the thirteenth episode, asking Midori to write dialogue for a fight between two of the characters. While printing out a draft for the scenario, Midori confronts Hiraoka about his previous words to her.
21	"Don't Hold the Quality Hostage"; Transliteration: "Kuoriti o Hitojichi ni Sunna" (Japanese: クオリティを人質にすんな)	March 5, 2015
During a delivery by the president of A.C Tsuchinoko, Hisamitsu Isokawa, he reunites with Hiraoka and Erika, who were his classmates in technical school. Misa gets the chance to do character CG animation for a scene in the show, inviting Ema and Shizuka to an amusement park to observe their reactions on a rollercoaster for inspiration. Following the premiere of the first episode, which is met with public acclaim, Aoi receives complaints from Segawa, who requests Hiraoka be taken off the show due to his attitude and his key animators' poor quality. Aoi relays this to Hiraoka, who angrily states that fussing over quality just makes his job harder. While trying to understand Hiraoka, Aoi hears from Erika about how his love and dedication for the industry hurt him when faced with the realities of the job, leading to his current attitude. Isokawa thinks that the way to balance quality and schedules is for the production team to communicate with the creators. Hearing this, Aoi decides to have Hiraoka continue working on the twelfth episode on the condition he communicates more clearly with the other animators. At night, Aoi is invited by Watanabe to meet Masahiko Inami and Keiji Takekura, the president and chief production assistant of The Born, respectively, who conducted Aoi's failed interview there. They note she has changed since then, leading her to realize her own goal to do her best and make great anime. With the thirteenth episode's storyboards finished quickly by Seiichi, Aoi assigns herself, Tsubaki, and Sara as its production team.
22	"Noa's in Her Underwear."; Transliteration: "Noa wa Shitagi desu." (Japanese: ノアは下着です。)	March 12, 2015
Now assigned as the animation supervisor for the thirteenth episode, Yumi, pressed by her large workload, nominates Ema to join Rinko as an assistant general animation supervisor to help her handle some cuts, having been impressed by the progress she displayed since Exodus!. However, Ema lacks confidence to take up the assignment and has to think it over. As a backup plan, Aoi approaches Segawa. Despite declining, Segawa is impressed by Aoi's sincerity and regains some of the motivation she lost following her incident with Hiraoka, returning to work on the twelfth episode. Meanwhile, Ema discovers Midori is enjoying her job in script ordering. As Nao Shinkawa drinks over her troubles alongside in-between animation inspector Chiemi Dōmoto, Hiraoka shares with Tarō about how previous work experiences left him with a cold attitude towards the anime industry. Misa visits Musashino to get advice from Ema on how to improve her CG animation. She improves it greatly by incorporating 2D animation techniques into the mix. The next day, Ema receives encouragement from Sugie and decides to take up the assistant supervisor position. She relays her confidence to her mother, which in turn gives Aoi the confidence to attend a meeting by herself. Just as recording wraps up on the final episode, Katsuragi is shocked to learn Nogame has rejected all of its storyboards.
23	"Table Flip Continued"; Transliteration: "Zoku Chabudai Gaeshi" (Japanese: 続·ちゃぶだい返し)	March 19, 2015
After Watanabe and Katsuragi fail to convince Chazawa and his boss to let them contact Nogame, the Musashino staff is forced to follow his wishes and keep the plot accurate to the story's original timeline, which would end the anime on an unhappy note with the death of a main character. Seiichi is unsatisfied with the prospect, feeling the ending needed to be happy. Hiraoka worked on an adaptation of another of Nogame's works, which ignored the original story and sparked backlash from the fanbase. Encouraged by Marukawa and Honda, Seiichi finds Nogame's email address and arranges a meeting with him. After getting past the editorial department with the help of Watanabe and Katsuragi, Seiichi hears directly from Nogame about how he sees the characters, and together, they use this information to come up with a compromise, for the anime would respect the manga, but also end on a hopeful note. As the meeting is concluded, Chazawa kept Nogame in the dark about Musashino's attempts to meet him, having hoped to lighten Nogame's workload. As a result, Chazawa is fired for his irresponsibility. As Musashino begins working on the revisions, which include the addition of a new character, Seiichi, impressed by her earlier auditions, calls in Shizuka to play her. While hearing Shizuka and Kyōko's recording, Aoi is moved to tears as she realizes all five club members have fulfilled their promise to work together on an anime production.
24	"The Delivery That Was Too Far Off"; Transliteration: "Tōsugita Nōhin" (Japanese: 遠すぎた納品)	March 26, 2015
There are three weeks left until the final episode has to be delivered. The work is focused on the scene featuring the new character, which is assigned to Ema, who requests it after being touched by Shizuka's performance. Shizuka finds enjoyment in being able to land minor voicing roles, while Misa stays up a night creating a CG model for a fighter jet. On the final day, after the episode is completed, the staff is tasked with delivering the tapes to TV stations across the country in time for the airing. As the others reach their assigned destinations in time, Aoi is held up by transport delays and is forced to complete the remainder of her trip on foot. Reaching the station, she reflects on everything she learned from her friends, which strengthens her resolve to keep making anime. At the party for the episode's airing, Aoi is praised for the support she provided to the staff and is brought onstage to give a toast. She delivers a speech praising everyone's pooled efforts and reminding them to continue this teamwork and bring further inspiration to viewers worldwide. Watanabe and Katsuragi decide to have Musashino Animation work on two anime simultaneously as their next projects. Aoi, Ema, Shizuka, Misa and Midori reaffirm their resolve to one day remake the anime they made in high school, promising each other to continue making great anime along the way.

=== OVAs ===
No.	Title	Original release date
1	"Exodus! Episode 1: Exit Tokyo"; Transliteration: "Ekusodasu! Dai-ichi-wa Shutsu-Tōkyō" (Japanese: 『えくそだすっ！』第1話 出トーキョー)	February 25, 2015
The idol group Tracy perform at a supermarket, but no one listens to them. They are actually the supermarket's employees. After commenting on their dismal number of fans, they receive a call from their "Onee-san", a woman who praises their performance. The group then eat some manjū, which inspires member Akane to confront their manager, Taguchi. The girls find Taguchi lying dead in a pool of blood. Near him is a bloody knife identical to the ones they kept as part of their costumes and a partial message written by Taguchi with his blood, beginning with the letter 'A'. The trio is spotted by someone who assumes they murdered Taguchi and alerts security. Onee-san then calls the girls on Taguchi's cellphone, instructing them to flee. Inspector Miho Koigakubo declares the girls wanted criminals, and their fanbase skyrockets as a result of this. They are eventually spotted by a fan and retreat to a parking lot. There, the girls find a motorbike supplied by Onee-san and flee with it. With the motorcycle, the girls evade the police and hop on a boat, where they swear to embark on a quest to prove their innocence.
2	"The Third Girls Aerial Squad Episode 1"; Transliteration: "Dai-san Hikō Shōjo-tai Dai-ichi-wa" (Japanese: 『第三飛行少女隊』第1話)	July 29, 2015
The enigmatic Builders appear to humanity, creating Pillars, structures which end up covering one-third of Earth's surface. They copy human technology for their own use before permanently disabling the real devices. The only aircraft that remain operational are those from the 1970s and before. Four years later, old jets travel to the Midway Base, which has been destroyed by a Pillar. They engage modern aircraft (Note: More specifically, Lockheed Martin F-22 Raptors.) while protecting a rescue transport plane. The plane is rescued from missiles by Aria Hitotose, a pilot of "Hell Alice", the 307 Aerial Squad. The rescue team recovers only one survivor, a teenage girl with amnesia, before being killed by another modern jet. (Note: More specifically, a Lockheed Martin F-35 Lightning II.) After destroying it, Aria puts the survivor in her cockpit. An experimental aircraft (Note: More specifically, a Mitsubishi ATD-X.) then attacks. Aria takes off, but the plane follows her, intent on killing the survivor. Olivia, Hell Alice's leader, sacrifices herself to save Aria and the survivor. Taking advantage of the ensuing explosion, Aria destroys the enemy plane. Later, the survivor is signed up on Hell Alice's roster, taking the name of Catherine Weller. The pilots are sent out to dispatch Builder jets which are carrying a Pillar Seed, the instrument required to create a Pillar.
