= Shirobako: The Movie =

2020 Japanese animated film by Tsutomu Mizushima

- Theatrical release poster
- Kanji: 劇場版 SHIROBAKO
- Revised Hepburn: Gekijōban Shirobako
- Directed by: Tsutomu Mizushima
- Written by: Michiko Yokote (Note: Her role is credited as Series composition (シリーズ構成, Shirīzu kōsei).)
- Screenplay by: Michiko Yokote
- Produced by: Takahiro Yamanaka; Kenta Maeda; Ryō Miyamura; Shinji Ōmori; Hiroyuki Aoi; Yoshinori Hasegawa; Terushige Yoshie; Keiko Ikezaki
- Starring: Juri Kimura; Haruka Yoshimura; Haruka Chisuga; Asami Takano; Hitomi Ōwada; Ayane Sakura; Yuri Yamaoka; Ikumi Hayama; Madoka Yonezawa; Shiori Izawa; Atsushi Tamaru; Masaya Matsukaze; Mai Nakahara; Hiroyuki Yoshino; Yūsuke Kobayashi; Nobuyuki Hiyama; Nobuyuki Kobushi
- Cinematography: Yukiyo Kajiwara
- Edited by: Ayumu Takahashi
- Music by: Shirō Hamaguchi
- Production companies: P.A. Works; Infinite
- Distributed by: Showgate
- Release date: February 29, 2020
- Running time: 119 minutes
- Country: Japan
- Language: Japanese
- Box office: US$3.78 million

Shirobako: The Movie (Japanese: 劇場版 SHIROBAKO, Hepburn: Gekijōban Shirobako) is a 2020 Japanese animated film and a sequel to the anime television series Shirobako (2014–2015). Produced by P.A. Works and Infinite and distributed by Showgate, the film is directed by Tsutomu Mizushima from a series composition led by Michiko Yokote and features an ensemble cast including Juri Kimura, Haruka Yoshimura, Haruka Chisuga, Asami Takano, and Hitomi Ōwada. Set four years after the events of the anime series, the film follows Aoi Miyamori leading an anime film project at Musashino Animation.

Talks for a sequel to the anime series began in 2016. The sequel, which was revealed to be an anime film, was announced in April 2018, along with the confirmed return of Mizushima and Yokote. The staff from the anime series were confirmed to be returning for the film in July 2019. The returning cast from the anime series were also confirmed that month and in January 2020. The film was completed three days before its theatrical release.

Shirobako: The Movie was released in Japan on February 29, 2020. The film grossed over $3 million worldwide and received a nomination at the Crunchyroll Anime Awards.

== Plot ==
Time Hippopotamus, Musashino Animation's original anime series, gets canceled after its sponsor could no longer finance it. As a result, some of the staff leave the studio and Masato Marukawa resigns as its president. In April 2019, (Note: Set four years after the events of Shirobako (2014–2015).) Aoi Miyamori and the remaining staff watch an episode of Third Aerial Girls Squad Medusa☆, an ecchi sequel to Third Aerial Girls Squad animated by Studio Taitanic Film. Shun Watanabe, the new president of Musashino, discusses with Miyamori the possibility of her producing Air Amphibious Assault Ship SIVA, an original feature-length anime film set to be released in February 2020. Gōtarō Katsuragi pleads to Miyamori to finish the film after GPU, the studio attached to it, failed to complete its storyboards while also demanding a bigger budget. With motivation from Marukawa, Miyamori accepts the job. She then meets Kaede Miyai, an assistant producer and Katsuragi's colleague at Western Entertainment who will be working with her on the film.

As the production starts nine months before the film's release, Miyamori suggests using the materials from Time Hippopotamus. She then convinces Seiichi Kinoshita to direct the film. Afterward, the two meet with Shimeji Maitake, who agrees to write the film's script. Miyamori invites Yumi Iguchi, who only offers to help with the character design, and recruits Rinko Osagawara. Misato Segawa and Yūichiro Shimoyanagi attempt to recruit Ryōsuke Endō, the one who has been affected by the cancellation of Time Hippopotamus the most. With motivation from his wife Mayumi, Ryōsuke finally decides to join the staff. Miyamori recruits Ema Yasuhara, while Shizuka Sasaki plans to audition for a role in the film and Misa Tōdō accepts the position as the film's chief animator. Miyamori asks Shigeru Sugie to help with an animal drawing in exchange for her accepting his favor to help with his animation class for children.

With six months left until the premiere, Maitake is not feeling satisfied with his script but after hearing Sasaki's audition and getting ideas from Midori Imai, he manages to complete it. Meanwhile, Masashi Yamada has been falsely accused of controversy and Yasuhara is encountering a problem with her corrected keyframes. Tarō Takanashi and Daisuke Hiroaka offer help with the film despite them now working in another studio. Two months later, Erika Yano returns to Musashino, helping with Kinoshita's storyboarding and recruiting Hiroshi Iketani. Miyamori, Yasuhara, Sakaki, Tōdō, and Imai participate in Sugie's animation class, during which they also garner experience and motivation. Sometime later, Sasaki passes the audition for the role of Arte in the film and Yasuhara finally submits well-corrected keyframes.

Katsuragi later informs Miyamori, Miyai, and Watanabe about GPU President Yoshio Misaki's claim that his studio has also the rights to the film. They fear that GPU might halt the production or wants to have a joint production as the lead. Miyamori and Miyai storm Misaki's office and inform him that he violated sections of the contract. With three weeks remaining until the premiere, the film has been completed, but Kinoshita feels the ending is rushed. Miyamori requests the production team to remake the final part to make the film satisfactory for themselves and the filmgoers. On the film's premiere, Miyamori, Yasuhara, Sakaki, Tōdō, and Imai visit a theater to watch the finished product.

== Voice cast ==
- Juri Kimura as Aoi Miyamori
  - Kimura also voices Mimuji and Roro
- Haruka Yoshimura as Ema Yasuhara
- Haruka Chisuga as Shizuka Sasaki
- Asami Takano as Misa Tōdō
- Hitomi Ōwada as Midori Imai
- Ayane Sakura as Kaede Miyai
- Masaya Matsukaze as Shun Watanabe
- Nobuyuki Hiyama as Seiichi Kinoshita
- Hironori Saitō as Hironori Madoka
- Kenji Hamada as Masashi Yamada
- Yuri Yamaoka as Erika Yano
- Madoka Yonezawa as Sara Satō
- Ikumi Hayama as Tsubaki Andō
  - Hayama also voiced the Matsutei proprietress
- Atsushi Tamaru as Kyuji Takahashi
- Shinobu Matsumoto as Ryōsuke Endō
  - Matsumoto also voiced Aoi's father
- Junji Majima as Yūichirō Shimoyanagi
- Kengo Takanashi as Yoshiki Sakura
- Shizuka Itō as Chiemi Dōmoto
  - Itō also voiced Eri Nakata
- Mari Hino as Nao Shinkawa
  - Hino also voiced Hiroko Tokiwa
- Ai Kayano as Rinko Ogasawara
- Manami Numakura as Yumi Iguchi
- Kotomi Yamakawa as Misato Segawa
- Shiori Izawa as Ai Kunogi
- Motoi Koyanagi as Shigeru Sugie
- Shūya Nishiji as Yutaka Honda
- Hiroyuki Yoshino as Tarō Takanashi
- Yūsuke Kobayashi as Daisuke Hiraoka
- Mai Nakahara as Yuka Okitsu
- Nobuyuki Kobushi as Gōtarō Katsuragi
- Kazuyuki Okitsu as Shimeji Maitake
  - Okitsu also voiced Takeru and Wataru Nakabayashi
- Daiki Hamano as Yūji Atsumi
  - Hamano also voiced Gorō Hamasaki
- Wataru Takagi as Masato Marukawa
  - Takagi also voiced Masahiko Inami
- Kenichi Suzumura as Yoshio Misaki
- Kaede Yuasa as Mai Okudo
- Genki Muro as Noriyuki Miyata
  - Muro also voiced Yūichi Nakai
- Takahiro Sakurai as Takezo Nogame
- Mari Yokoo as Mari Tateo
- Masayoshi Sugawara as Nobuaki Nakagaichi
  - Sugawara also voiced Mitsuhide Kisa and Hiroshi Iketani
- Chinami Hashimoto as Mayumi Endō
  - Hashimoto also voiced Ayako Nakami and Haru
- Mitsuo Iwata as Yoshikazu Inanami
- Ikuji Nose as Atsushi Yamabuchi
- Rie Takahashi as Asuka Fuji
  - Takahashi also voiced Akane Uchida
- Shinya Takahashi as Takumi Ōyama
- Makoto Yasumura as Keiji Takekura
- Katsuyuki Konishi as Gen Asugawa
- Akinori Egoshi as Hiroshi Kishitani
- Itaru Yamamoto as Masato Onōe
- Jiro Saito as Tatsuya Handō
- Jun Fukushima as Shinsuke Chazawa
- Yuka Keicho as Eri Shiratori
  - Keicho also voiced Aoi's mother
- Haruo Yamagishi as Director Shinoda
  - Yamagishi also voiced the Matsutei owner
- Nozomi Kasuga as Mone Kujō
- Hisako Kanemoto as Kyoko Suzuki
- Satomi Moriya as Kaori Miyamori

== Production ==
=== Development ===
Initial talks for a sequel to the anime television series Shirobako (2014–2015) began a year after the end of its broadcast. During the P.A. Works panel at the Tokyo Anime Award Festival in March 2016, Shirobako producer Takayuki Nagatani teased that "there might be a chance [for a sequel]" to the anime series if a theme could be decided. P.A. Works CEO Kenji Horikawa would like "to see a story about Aoi [Miyamori] going back to her hometown and teaching an anime class for children" in the sequel. The staff "could always make a sequel if [they] wanted to" since they could use their daily lives during the production of an anime as the story, but it took a few years for them to ask the anime series director Tsutomu Mizushima to helm the sequel due to his "far in advance" schedule.

=== Pre-production ===
In April 2018, an anime film project, which was described as an "all-new work" and would continue the story seen in the anime series, was confirmed to be in the works at P.A. Works, with Infinite producing, and to be helmed by the staff from the anime series, including Mizushima, screenwriter Michiko Yokote, character designer Ponkan8, and animation character designer Kanami Sekiguchi. Since a film had a limited runtime as opposed to a 24-episode television series, Nagatani decided the film's theme would be about depicting the behind-the-scene production of an anime film; the theme that made him become interested as he saw the anime market "somewhat transitioning" to films and due to fact that Shirobako had already depicted the behind-the-scene production of an anime television series. At the AnimeJapan 2019 in March, it was revealed the script for the film has been written. During the attendance, Horikawa revealed that he was expecting the film to be completed by the end of that year. He also revealed the film's timeline to be taking place five years after the events of the anime series, which would be equivalent to the gap between the end of the anime series' broadcast and the film's early 2020 release. Additionally, a character sheet for the new character named Miyai was exclusively revealed to the audience. Her design was described as "very much in the style of the other Shirobako principal cast, with similar facial features but a more mature hair style."

Additional staff from the anime series was revealed to be returning for the film in July 2019, including cinematographer Yukiyo Kajiwara and editor Ayumu Takahashi. A key visual drawn by Sekiguchi was also revealed, which introduced Miyai. That month, Juri Kimura, Haruka Yoshimura, Haruka Chisuga, Asami Takano, Hitomi Ōwada, Shūya Nishiji, Yoshitsugu Matsuoka, Yuri Yamaoka, Hiroyuki Yoshino, Ai Kayano, Masaya Matsukaze, and Mai Nakahara were revealed to be reprising their roles from the anime series as Aoi Miyamori, Ema Yasuhara, Shizuka Sakaki, Misa Tōdō, Midori Imai, Yutaka Honda, Tatsuya Ochiai, Erika Yano, Tarō Takanashi, Rinko Ogasawara, Hayabusa Watanabe, and Yuka Okitsu, respectively.

=== Post-production ===
At the C3AFA Tokyo 2019 in August, Horikawa revealed that the dubbing was completed, while the storyboard for the film's last scene was not yet finished. At the same time, Nagatani confirmed the film would not be completed by the end of that year and corrected the story's timeline to be taking place four years after the events of the anime series. In September 2019, Ayane Sakura joined the cast as the voice of the new character fully named Kaede Miyai. Additional returning cast from the anime series were revealed in January 2020, including Ikumi Hayama as Tsubaki Andō, Madoka Yonezawa as Sara Satō, Shiori Izawa as Ai Kunogi, Yūsuke Kobayashi as Daisuke Hiraoka, Nobuyuki Hiyama as Seiichi Kinoshita, and Nobuyuki Kobushi as Gōtarō Katsuragi, with Atsushi Tamaru joining them as Kyūji Takahashi.

The final cut of the film was finished on February 3, 2020, with its runtime clocking in under two hours. The film was completed on February 26, 2020, three days before its scheduled theatrical release. By the premiere, Kaede Yuasa, Masayoshi Sugawara, Rie Takahashi, and Genki Muro confirmed their casting in the film.

== Music ==
In July 2019, Shirō Hamaguchi was revealed to be composing Shirobako: The Movie after previously doing so for the anime series Shirobako. In December 2019, Fhána revealed that they would be performing the film's ending theme music titled "Trace the Stars" (星をあつめて, Hoshi o Atsumete). (Note: The theme music's English translation was first reported as "Gather the Stars". Its single album cover confirms the official translation as "Trace the Stars".) Fhána's leader Jun'ichi Satō suggested a theme music with the similar tempo as "Somewhen, Some Worlds with You" (いつかの、いくつかのきみとのせかい, Itsuka no, Iku Tsuka no Kimi to no Sekai), the opening theme music of The Kawai Complex Guide to Manors and Hostel Behavior (2014), when the staff wanted to have a "ballad-like" song. They settled with "a mid-tempo song that was relaxing, but also had dramatic and serious elements." The theme music's single was released in Japan on February 26, 2020. That month, Cher Watanabe revealed that he was the composer of the film's opening theme music "Well, It Can't Be Helped" (仕方ないのでやれやれ, Jikata Nai Node Yare Yare), performed by Shito from the Japanese musical duo ReReGRAPHICS.

All music is composed by Hamaguchi, except where indicated.

Shirobako: The Movie – Soundtrack & Insert Songs track listing
| No. | Title | Music | Length |
|---|---|---|---|
| 1. | "Past and Future" (これまでと、これからと) | | 4:23 |
| 2. | "And the Usual Musashino Animation" (そしていつもの武蔵野アニメーション) | | 0:33 |
| 3. | "Third Aerial Girls Squad Medusa☆" (第三飛行少女隊 めでゅーさ☆) | | 0:13 |
| 4. | "Aria, Scramble!" (ありあ、スクランブル!) | | 1:27 |
| 5. | "I'll Master Arm On!" (マスターアームオン!だぞ) | | 0:13 |
| 6. | "Virtuoso Masashi Yamada" (巨匠・山田昌志) | | 1:00 |
| 7. | "Each Now..." (それぞれの今…) | | 2:21 |
| 8. | "Mimuroro's Theme" (ミムロロのテーマ) | | 0:30 |
| 9. | "Be Yourself" (ありのままの自分) | | 1:17 |
| 10. | "Voice Actor Lalalala" (声優ララララ) | | 0:45 |
| 11. | "Our Seven Lucky Gods Today" (私たちの七福陣の今) | | 0:32 |
| 12. | "Crossroads" (岐路) | | 0:30 |
| 13. | "Buddies Taro & Hiraoka" (バディ タロー&平岡) | | 3:23 |
| 14. | "Unchanging Peace of Mind" (変わらない安らぎを) | | 0:53 |
| 15. | "The Irresistible Reality" (抗えない現実に) | | 2:36 |
| 16. | "Let's Make Anime" (アニメーションをつくりましょう) | | 4:30 |
| 17. | "Its Name Is GPU" (その名はげ～ぺ～う～) | | 1:43 |
| 18. | "A New Friend, Kaede Miyai" (新たなる仲間・宮井楓) | | 1:41 |
| 19. | "Musani, Full Speed Ahead!" (ムサニ、全速前進!) | | 1:19 |
| 20. | "Let's Do Our Best, Director!" (頑張りましょう、監督!) | | 1:42 |
| 21. | "Let's Climb! This Mountain!!" (登りましょう!この山へ!!) | | 0:42 |
| 22. | "Musani Restart I" (ムサニリスタート I) | | 1:24 |
| 23. | "Musani Restart II" (ムサニリスタート II) | | 3:06 |
| 24. | "By the Riverside" (川辺にて) | | 0:41 |
| 25. | "If Kindness Enveloped You" (やさしさが包んだのなら) | | 1:18 |
| 26. | "Musani Dynamic" (ムサニ躍動) | | 2:12 |
| 27. | "Cheap Synth Music" (チープな打ち込み系) | | 0:08 |
| 28. | "Ta-tatap Synth Music" (テッテケ打ち込み系) | | 0:11 |
| 29. | "Musani's Daily Life" (ムサニの日常) | | 2:50 |
| 30. | "Bride and Raven" (ブライド アンド レイブン) | | 0:28 |
| 31. | "From Steady Days to Upheaval..." (風雲急、順調な日々から…) | | 1:17 |
| 32. | "Slumps, Setbacks, Conflicts" (スランプ・挫折・葛藤) | | 3:01 |
| 33. | "Reliable Friends" (頼れる仲間たち) | | 2:09 |
| 34. | "Escape... and Beyond" (逃走…その先に) | | 0:16 |
| 35. | "A Child Can Do It If Tried" (苦悩するやれば出来る子) | | 1:37 |
| 36. | "Namerō March" (なめろうマーチ) | Schubert | 0:36 |
| 37. | "The Meaning of Our Anime" (私たちがアニメーションを作る意味) | | 1:56 |
| 38. | "Despair Is Here Now" (今、ここにある絶望) | | 1:30 |
| 39. | "Let's Raid, Aoi" (あおい、討ち入ります) | | 2:41 |
| 40. | "The Producer's Silent Struggle" (プロデューサー静かなる闘い) | | 3:06 |
| 41. | "SIVA Ending" (SIVAエンディング) | | 0:45 |
| 42. | "Who Are We Making It For?" (誰の為に作るのか?) | | 0:45 |
| 43. | "Shirobako the Movie" (劇場版SHIROBAKO) | | 2:28 |
| 44. | "Air Amphibious Assault Ship SIVA" (空中強襲揚陸艦SIVA) | | 5:37 |
| 45. | "The Story Continues, Each to Their Future" (物語は続く、それぞれの未来へ) | | 0:52 |
| 46. | "Well, It Can't Be Helped (Full Version)" (仕方ないのでやれやれ (FULL VERSION)) | Cher Watanabe | 3:50 |
| Total length: | | | 76:57 |

== Marketing ==
A teaser trailer for Shirobako: The Movie was released on August 8, 2019. It features a tagline stating, "We will not give up! Not until we fulfill our promise..." (私たちは諦めない約束を果たすその日まで…) In December 2019, Amnibus, a Japanese merchandise manufacturer, revealed merchandise for the film. In January 2020, T-Arts revealed capsule toys for the film. A full-length trailer for the film was released on January 29, 2020. In February 2020, Waku Work, a job fair for jobseekers in the anime industry, announced a collaboration with the film. That month, the film held a collaboration with Krispy Kreme through their store in Kichijōji, Musashino, Tokyo. Air Amphibious Assault Ship SIVA Thank You Book, which contains illustrations from the staff and comments from the cast, was given as a present to the filmgoers during the film's fifth week of release.

== Release ==
=== Theatrical ===
Shirobako: The Movie was released in Japan on February 29, 2020. It was previously scheduled to be released in March 2020. The remastered version of the film was released in seven theaters in Japan on August 28, 2020. Eleven Arts released the film in North America on August 10, 2021, with its premiere screening event in the United States featuring a recap of Shirobako. As part of Scotland Loves Anime 2021, the film was screened in Glasgow on October 1 and in Edinburgh on October 17.

=== Home media ===
U-Next exclusively streamed Shirobako: The Movie from December 5, 2020, to January 4, 2021. The film was released on Blu-ray and DVD in Japan on January 8, 2021. The Blu-ray deluxe edition is bundled with a bonus booklet, the simplified reduced version of Air Amphibious Assault Ship SIVA Thank You Book, and CDs containing the film's soundtrack and insert songs and the two newly-recorded audio dramas. The film became available for rent through streaming services in Japan on February 8, 2021, and began its unlimited streaming on January 25, 2022. Infinite's YouTube channel streamed the film from April 1 to May 7, 2023.

Shout! Factory released the film digitally and on Blu-ray and DVD combo pack in the United States and Canada on December 7, 2021; it was previously scheduled to be released on October 26. The film began streaming on Crunchyroll on December 22, 2022.

== Reception ==
=== Box office ===
Shirobako: The Movie grossed $3.75 million in Japan and $36,091 in South Korea, for a worldwide total of $3.78 million.

The film grossed ¥115 million ($1.05 million) in its opening weekend in Japan. It debuted third place at the box office in terms of ticket sales, behind Stolen Identity 2 (2020), but it earned ¥3 million more than the latter due to high ticket price, ranking it second in terms of box office earnings for that weekend. It was also the highest-grossing new film released that weekend, surpassing the 2020 American film The Call of the Wild despite playing in half as many theaters as the latter. The film earned ¥42.9 million ($414,000) in its second weekend, dropping to sixth at the box office, and ¥23.6 million ($221,400) in its third weekend, dropping to eighth. It dropped off the box office ranking in its fourth weekend after earning ¥20 million ($181,300).

=== Critical response ===
Audiences polled by the Japanese ticketing and publishing company Pia gave Shirobako: The Movie a first-day satisfaction rating of 93.6%, the highest among the films released on February 28–29, 2020.

Daryl Harding of Crunchyroll felt the film was "a love letter to the anime industry, while not (totally) sugarcoating the issues that currently face everyone working in it. Anime and animation itself are wonderful, but Shirobako clearly shows that the industry is teetering on the edge with poor scheduling habits forced upon studios that clearly can't handle it." Harding praised the musical interlude that he described as "an ode to different styles of anime past, blended together into one scene", and how the film depicted an anime being produced in 2020 and referenced other works in the background (specifically One Piece, Food Wars!: Shokugeki no Soma, Girls und Panzer, and the 2019 South Korean film Parasite). However, Harding noted the little presence of Aoi Miyamori's high school friends in exchange for Kaede Miyai and the runtime had caused the film to not "dive a little deeper into the industry and newer methods of animation that have changed since 2014." Kim Morrissy of Anime News Network graded the film "B", feeling that it was "more like a throwback than a sequel, despite chronologically taking place four years after the ending of the original anime." Morrissy praised how the film depicted the entirety of the characters despite some of them only appearing in the background, stating that "Shirobako is more of an ensemble story anyway", and liked how it gave highlights to the personal lives of side characters such as the animator Ryōsuke Endō "since it's not often that we get to see animators existing outside of their work, even in real life." However, Morrissy noted the "lack of realism" in the film "in favor of pursuing a fairy tale ending."

Brittany Vincent gave the film 7 out of 10 for IGN, feeling that it was "a charming addition to the slice-of-life drama series, and it's undeniably fun to catch up with a wide array of characters who popped up throughout the course of the anime. Unfortunately, while it maintains its enjoyable look at how real-world animation studios operate, it's all too content to tread the same familiar waters. It's worth watching for hardcore fans, but for newcomers, it's not really necessary." Vincent lauded how the film highlighted the moments between the employees of Musashino Animation without leaving anyone out of the spotlight, feeling that it was "satisfying in a distinctly Shirobako way", and featured personal lives of characters outside their work, particularly Endō's interaction with his wife Mayumi. However, Vincent found similarities in terms of story beats when comparing the film with the anime series and felt the progression of the characters after the story's four-year gap "may not seem worthwhile". Writing for The Japan Times, Matt Schley gave the film 3.5 out of 5 stars, feeling that it "doesn't bring much to the table that the series didn't five years ago." Despite stating that it "doesn't feel essential", he felt the film was "a lot of fun to see these characters again, fighting against scheming rights holders, seemingly impossible deadlines and creative doubts to dream up something that is worth their viewers' time." He felt the film served as "a kind of greatest hits for the original, with many situations and jokes repeated almost line for line", while finding the new characters lacking a dynamic. He noted Miyamori and her high school friends had the same existential questions from the anime series despite the story progressing four years later.

=== Accolade ===
Shirobako: The Movie was nominated for Best Film at the 6th Crunchyroll Anime Awards held in February 2022.

== Manga adaptation ==
A manga adaptation of Shirobako: The Movie is illustrated by Kazuhiro Fuchida, with composition by Rina Fujita. It was serialized on the manga website Manga Kingdom from January 31, 2021, to May 25, 2022, consisting of nine chapters. The chapters were re-edited to be collected in a single paperback tankōbon under the title Shirobako: The Movie – Comicalize Version (劇場版 SHIROBAKO コミカライズ版, Gekijōban Shirobako: Komikaraizu Han), which was published in Japan by Parubooks in late September 2022.
