= Ikumi Hayama =

Japanese voice actress and narrator

- 葉山 いくみ
- Born: Tokyo, Japan
- Other name: Ikumi Fujiwara (藤原 郁美)
- Occupations: Voice actress; narrator
- Years active: 2004–present
- Agent: Clare Voice

Ikumi Hayama (葉山 いくみ, Hayama Ikumi), also known as Ikumi Fujiwara (藤原 郁美, Fujiwara Ikumi), is a Japanese voice actress and narrator.

== Biography ==
After working at Beeface Creative and Osawa Office, she joined Vi-Vo. Hayama reported on her blog she was married on March 29, 2014. In December 2014, she left Vi-Vo and announced on her blog she worked freelance in January 2015. She joined Clare Voice on April 1, 2015.

== Filmography ==
=== Anime series ===
2009

- Fairy Tail as Laki Olietta
- Sora no Manimani as Yoshinari; Yuriko Isoyama

2010

- Durarara!! as Arisa
- Kuragehime as Waitress
- Mitsudomoe as Sakiko Matsuoka
- Occult Academy as Waitress
- Shiki as Yuki Shiomi

2011

- Heaven's Memo Pad as Mika
- High Score as Kaori Tachibana
- Honto ni Atta! Reibai-Sensei as Motoko Mihoro
- Mitsudomoe Zōryōchū! as Sakiko Matsuoka
- Oniichan no Koto Nanka Zenzen Suki Janain Dakara ne—!! as Maid
- Pocket Monsters: Best Wishes! as Cabernet
- Steins;Gate as Maid

2012

- Girls und Panzer as Nekonyā
- Muv-Luv Alternative: Total Eclipse as Tonya Upenskona
- Tari Tari as Mika Sakaki
- The Pet Girl of Sakurasou as Research Student B
- Pocket Monsters: Best Wishes! Season 2 as Cabernet
- Tonari no Kaibutsu-kun as Yayoi

2013

- Attack on Titan as Anka Rheinberger
- Gargantia on the Verdurous Planet as Pilot
- Genshiken Nidaime as Keiko Sasahara
- Jewelpet Happiness as Nene Konoe
- JoJo's Bizarre Adventure as Announcer
- Log Horizon as Elissa
- Nagi no Asukara as Yū Seiki
- Ore no Nōnai Sentakushi ga, Gakuen Rabu Kome o Zenryoku de Jama Shiteiru as Kanarin
- Strike the Blood as Sayaka Kirasaka
- Toaru Kagaku no Railgun S as Shinobu Nunotaba
- Yozakura Quartet ~Hana no Uta~ as Sawaki

2014

- Argevollen as Akino Terai
- Witch Craft Works as Atori Kuramine
- Wizard Barristers as Diana
- Cross Ange as Eleanor, Kaname
- JoJo's Bizarre Adventure: Stardust Crusaders as Female Student A

2015

- Gate: Jieitai Kanochi nite, Kaku Tatakaeri as Hamilton Uno Law
- Shirobako as Tsubaki Andō, Valroph
- Is It Wrong to Try to Pick Up Girls in a Dungeon? as Naaza Erisuis

2016

- Keijo as Sanae Hououin
- BBK/BRNK as Farrah Umlauf

2017

- Minami Kamakura High School Girls Cycling Club as Hiroko Azuma
- Is It Wrong to Try to Pick Up Girls in a Dungeon? On the Side: Sword Oratoria as Alicia Forestlight

2018

- Citrus as Kayo Maruta

2019

- Is It Wrong to Try to Pick Up Girls in a Dungeon? II as Naaza Erisuis

2020

- Log Horizon: Destruction of the Round Table as Elissa
- Is It Wrong to Try to Pick Up Girls in a Dungeon? III as Naaza Erisuis

2022

- Vermeil in Gold as Heliodor

=== Anime films ===
2015

- The Anthem of the Heart as Odagiri

2020

- Shirobako: The Movie as Tsubaki Andō

=== Original video animation ===
2016

- Strike the Blood II as Sayaka Kirasaka

2018

- Strike the Blood III as Sayaka Kirasaka

2019

- Magimoji Rurumo: The Conclusion as Mimi

2020

- Strike the Blood: Kieta Seisō-hen as Sayaka Kirasaka
- Strike the Blood IV as Sayaka Kirasaka

2022

- Strike the Blood Final as Sayaka Kirasaka
