= Kare Baka =

Japanese manga series

カレバカ
- Genre: Comedy
- Manga

Wagahai no Kare wa Baka de Aru
- Written by: Kazusa Yoneda
- Illustrated by: Saki Azumi
- Published by: Hakusensha
- Magazine: Young Animal Island
- Original run: 2012 – 2014
- Volumes: 2
- Manga

Kare Baka: Wagahai no Kare wa Baka de R
- Written by: Kazusa Yoneda
- Illustrated by: Saki Azumi
- Published by: Hakusensha
- Magazine: Young Animal Island
- Original run: 2015 – present
- Original net animation
- Directed by: Akiko Seki
- Studio: Sakura Create
- Released: October 16, 2015 – January 22, 2016
- Runtime: 5 minutes (per episode)
- Episodes: 8

Kare Baka: Wagahai no Kare wa Baka de R (カレバカ～吾輩ノ彼ハ馬鹿でR～; lit. Idiot Boyfriend: My Boyfriend is an Idiot) is a Japanese gag manga series, written by Masahiro Totsuka and with art by Saki Azumi, serialized in Hakusensha's seinen manga magazine Young Animal Island. It was previously serialized in the same magazine under the title Wagahai no Kare wa Baka de Aru (吾輩ノ彼ハ馬鹿である) between 2012 and 2014, which was collected in two tankōbon volumes. A web anime series adaptation has been announced. The anime is directed by Akiko Seki with character designs by Erina Kojima and produced by Sakura Create. Online manga website Young Animal Densi in which Hakusensha simultaneously published the manga, began streaming the first two episodes of the anime on October 16, 2015.

== Plot ==
The story follows everyday lives of a girl named Akomi Natsuki and her boyfriend Ponta Ninomiya. Ninomiya is a super idiot who has no redeeming qualities aside from having a very handsome face.

== Characters ==
Akomi Natsuki (夏樹亜子美, Natsuki Akomi)
Voiced by: Juri Kimura
Ponta Ninomiya (二ノ宮ポン太, Ponta Ninomiya)
Voiced by: Daisuke Namikawa
Piisuke Kurosaki (黒崎ピー助, Kurosaki Piisuke)
Voiced by: Katsuyuki Konishi
Monyokichi Ootori (鳳モニョ吉, Ōtori Monyokichi)
Voiced by: Satoshi Hino
Peruhiko Saijō (西条ペル彦, Saijō Peruhiko)
Voiced by: Daiki Yamashita
