= Gekidol =

Japanese multimedia franchise

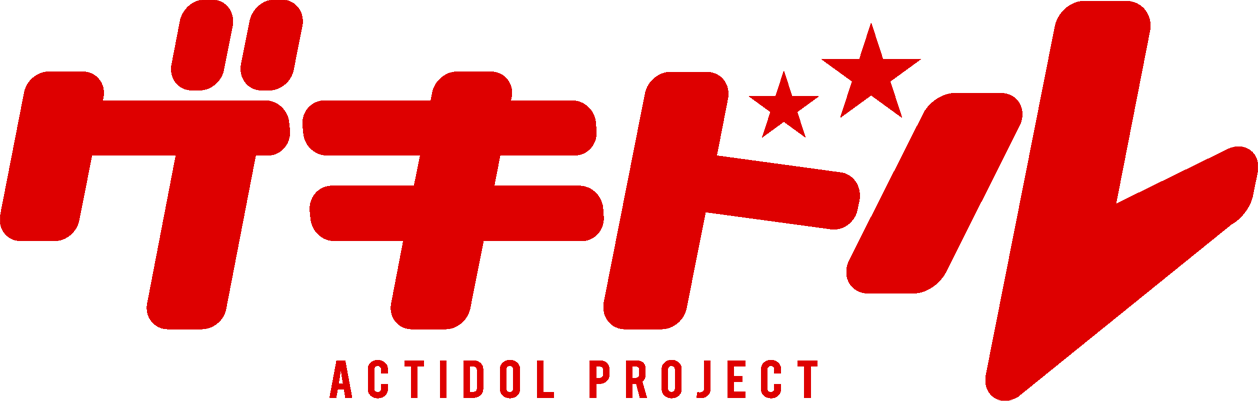

ゲキドル
- Manga

Gekidol Alive
- Written by: Kazuya Hatazawa
- Illustrated by: Asami Sekiya
- Published by: ASCII Media Works
- Magazine: Dengeki Maoh
- Original run: December 27, 2016 – present
- Original video animation

Alice in Deadly School
- Directed by: Shigeyasu Yamauchi
- Written by: Yume Kageyama
- Music by: Prhythm/epx
- Studio: Hoods Entertainment
- Licensed by: Crunchyroll (Note: In North America through Crunchyroll, LLC (formerly known as Funimation).)
- Released: January 4, 2021
- Anime television series
- Directed by: Shigeru Ueda
- Written by: Keiichirō Ōchi (chief); Gekidol production committee
- Music by: Prhythm/epx
- Studio: Hoods Entertainment
- Licensed by: Crunchyroll
- Original network: AT-X, BS Fuji
- Original run: January 5, 2021 – March 23, 2021
- Episodes: 12

Gekidol (Japanese: ゲキドル) is a Japanese multimedia franchise. It consists of a manga series, titled Gekidol Alive, which has been serialized in Dengeki Maoh since December 2016, an OVA, titled Alice in Deadly School, released in January 2021, an anime television series, which aired from January to March 2021, and a stage play.

== Characters ==
Seria Morino (守野 せりあ, Morino Seria)
Voiced by: Hikaru Akao (Japanese); Macy Anne Johnson (English)
Airi Kagami (各務 あいり, Kagami Airi)
Voiced by: Chihira Mochida (Japanese); Madeleine Morris (English)
Izumi Hinazaki (雛咲 いずみ, Hinazaki Izumi)
Voiced by: Ayaka Suwa (Japanese); Stephanie Sheh (English)
Kaworu Sakakibara (榊原 かをる, Sakakibata Kaworu)
Voiced by: Kana Hanazawa (Japanese); Caitlin Glass (English)
Doll (ドール)
Voiced by: M.A.O (Japanese); Xanthe Huynh (English)
Akira Asagi (浅葱 晃, Asagi Akira)
Voiced by: Nozomi Yamamoto (Japanese); Marissa Lenti (English)
Manami Fujita (藤田 愛美, Fujita Manami)
Voiced by: Asami Takano (Japanese); Dani Chambers (English)
Kazeharu Yamamoto (山本 和春, Yamamoto Kazeharu)
Voiced by: Aya Akiyoshi (Japanese); Emily Fajardo (English)
Mayuri Nakamura (中村 繭璃, Nakamura Mayuri)
Voiced by: Amina Sato (Japanese); Apphia Yu (English)
Hirokazu Takezaki (竹崎 宏和, Takezaki Hirokazu)
Voiced by: Kohsuke Toriumi (Japanese); Kaiji Tang (English)
Makoto Higuchi (樋口 真琴, Higuchi Makoto)
Voiced by: Sarara Yashima (Japanese); Kira Buckland (English)
Tomoko Hinata (日向 智子, Hinata Tomoko)
Voiced by: Kaori Mizuhashi (Japanese); Jamie Marchi (English)

== Media ==
=== Manga ===
A manga series written by Kazuya Hatazawa and illustrated by Asami Sekiya, titled Gekidol Alive (ゲキドル アライヴ), began serialization in Dengeki Maoh on December 27, 2016.

=== OVA ===
An original video animation (OVA), titled Alice in Deadly School (アリスインデッドリースクール), was announced in August 2016. It was produced by Hoods Entertainment, with direction by Shigeyasu Yamauchi, Yume Kageyama writing the scripts, Kiyoshi Tateishi designing the characters, and Prhythm/epx composing the music. The OVA premiered on January 4, 2021. It was licensed by Funimation outside of Asia.

=== Anime ===
The project was first announced in December 2015. In September 2020, it was announced the series would be produced by Hoods Entertainment and directed by Shigeru Ueda, with the chief writer being Keiichirō Ōchi and series composition credited to the Gekidol Production Committee, Kiyoshi Tateishi designing the characters, and Prhythm/epx composing the music. The series aired on AT-X from January 5 to March 23, 2021.

Internationally, the series was also licensed by Funimation outside of Asia. On February 13, 2022, Funimation announced the series would receive an English dub, which premiered the following day.

==== Episode list ====
No.	Title (Note: All English titles are taken from Funimation.)	Original release date
1	"Play"; Transliteration: "Shibai" (Japanese: 芝居)	January 5, 2021
2	"A Theater Named Desire"; Transliteration: "Yokubō to iu na no Gekijō" (Japanese: 欲望という名の劇場)	January 12, 2021
3	"Waiting for Airi"; Transliteration: "Airi o Machinagara" (Japanese: アイリを待ちながら)	January 19, 2021
4	"The Birthday Party"; Transliteration: "Bāsudi Pātī" (Japanese: バースディ・パーティー)	January 26, 2021
5	"The Cherry Orchard"; Transliteration: "Sakura no en" (Japanese: 桜の園)	February 2, 2021
6	"A Doll's House"; Transliteration: "Ningyō no ie" (Japanese: 人形の家)	February 9, 2021
7	"Much Ado About Nothing"; Transliteration: "Karasawagi" (Japanese: から騒ぎ)	February 16, 2021
8	"What Made Her Do It?"; Transliteration: "Nani ga kanojo o sō sa seta ka" (Japanese: 何が彼女をそうさせたか)	February 23, 2021
9	"The Living Corpse"; Transliteration: "Ikerushikabane" (Japanese: 生ける屍)	March 2, 2021
10	"The Creation of the World and Other Business"; Transliteration: "Sekainosōzō to Sonohoka no Koto" (Japanese: 世界の創造とその他の事)	March 9, 2021
11	"When We Dead Awaken"; Transliteration: "Watashi-tachi Shinda Mono ga Mezametara" (Japanese: わたしたち死んだものが目覚めたら)	March 16, 2021
12	"All's Well That Ends Well"; Transliteration: "Owariyokerebasubeteyoshi" (Japanese: 終わりよければすべてよし)	March 23, 2021

=== Stage play ===
A stage play was shown in the Theater Sun-mall in Tokyo from March 3 to March 7, 2021.

== Reception ==
The reviewers at Anime News Network felt the premiere was dull and tried to do too much. Anime Feminist concurred, calling it boring and nothing special.
