= Shōgo Noda =

Japanese baseball player

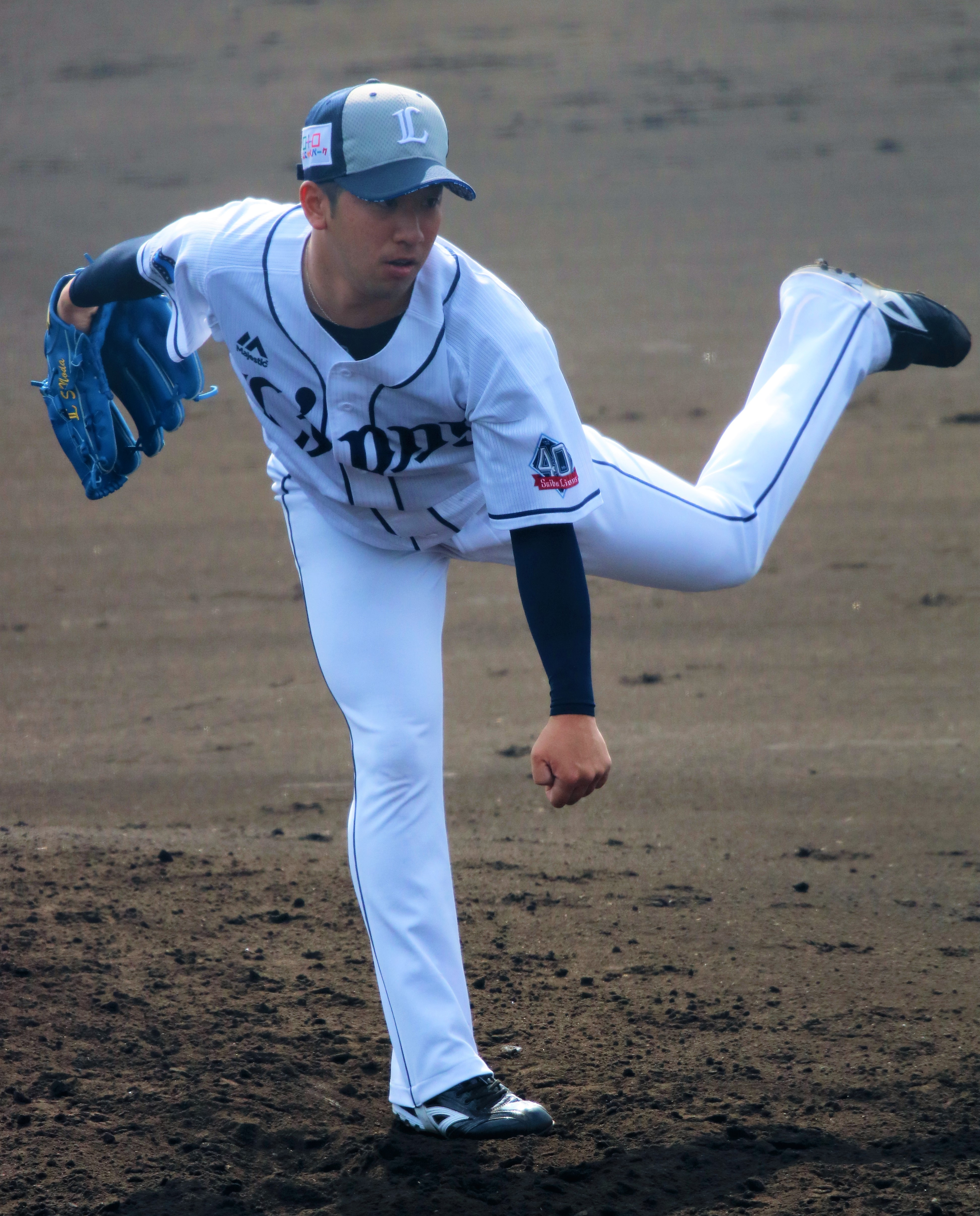
- Pitcher
- Born: June 27, 1993 (age 32); Itoshima, Fukuoka, Japan
- Batted: Left Threw: Left

NPB debut
- June 28, 2016, for the Saitama Seibu Lions

Last NPB appearance
- August 20, 2020, for the Saitama Seibu Lions

Career statistics (through 2020 season)
- Win–loss record: 4–1
- Earned run average: 3.09
- Strikeouts: 92
- Saves: 1
- Holds: 26
- Stats at Baseball Reference

Teams
- Saitama Seibu Lions (2016–2020)

Shōgo Noda (野田 昇吾, Noda Shōgo; born June 27, 1993 in Itoshima, Fukuoka, Japan) is a Japanese former professional baseball pitcher. He has played in his entire career with the Nippon Professional Baseball (NPB) for the Saitama Seibu Lions.

== Career ==
Saitama Seibu Lions selected Noda with the third selection in the 2015 NPB draft.

On June 28, 2016, Noda made his NPB debut.

On December 2, 2020, he become a free agent. On December 14, 2020, Noda announced his retirement.

== Personal ==
His wife is a Japanese Voice actress Haruka Yoshimura.
