= Haruka Yoshimura =

Japanese voice actress

- 佳村 はるか
- Born: February 14, 1986 (age 40); Osaka Prefecture, Japan
- Occupation: Voice actress
- Years active: 2011–present
- Agent: I'm Enterprise
- Spouse: Shōgo Noda (since 2019)

Haruka Yoshimura (佳村 はるか, Yoshimura Haruka; born February 14, 1986) is a Japanese voice actress affiliated with the talent agency I'm Enterprise. She voices in a number of Japanese anime shows, with main characters Kōko Kaminaga in Riddle Story of Devil, Ema Yasuhara in Shirobako, Nono Natsume in Urara Meirocho and Yui Nanase in Go! Princess Precure.

On December 31, 2019, she married Saitama Seibu Lions pitcher Shōgo Noda.

== Filmography ==
=== Anime ===
List of voice performances in anime
Title	Role	Notes	Source
2014
Saki: The Nationals	Yūko Mase		
Riddle Story of Devil	Kōko Kaminaga		
selector infected WIXOSS	Female student		
The Irregular at Magic High School	Third-year student competitor		
Locodol	Yuki Kashiwabara		
Celestial Method	Koharu Shiihara		
Shirobako	Ema Yasuhara		
2015–2017
The Idolmaster Cinderella Girls series	Mika Jougasaki		
2015
Go! Princess PreCure	Yui Nanase, Noriko Komaki		
Jewelpet: Magical Change	Miya		
Suzakinishi the Animation	Mai-chan		
2015–2016
The Asterisk War	RM-C	2 seasons	
2016
Handa-kun	Sumika Saitō		
All Out!!	Umeno Hoakari		
2017
Urara Meirocho	Nono Natsume		
2019–2020
Hulaing Babies series	Suzu		
2019
Domestic Girlfriend	Momo Kashiwabara		
2019–2020
Azur Lane	Langley		
2020
Tamayomi	Kyōka Fujii		

=== Film ===
List of voice performances in film
Year	Title	Role	Notes	Source
2015	Go! Princess PreCure The Movie: Go! Go!! Splendid Triple Feature!!!	Yui Nanase		
2017	Pretty Cure Dream Stars!	Yui Nanase		
2020	Shirobako: The Movie	Ema Yasuhara		

=== Video games ===
List of voice performances in video games
Year	Title	Role	Notes	Source
2015	Princess Connect! ja:プリンセスコネクト!	Nanaka Tanno		
2015	Saki Zenkoku-hen	Yūko Mase	PS Vita	
2016	The Asterisk War: Houka Kenran	RM-C	PS Vita	
2016–2018	Girls' Frontline	Gr MG4, FAL	Mobile game	
2017	God Wars: Future Past	Sakuya		
2015	Princess Connect! Re:Dive	Nanaka Tanno	Mobile	
2017	Magia Record	Hazuki Yusa	Mobile	
	Puyopuyo!! Quest	Seriri		
2020	Fate/Grand Order	Yang Guifei	Mobile	
	Granblue Fantasy	Mika Jougasaki		
	The Idolmaster series	Mika Jougasaki		
	Senko No Ronde 2	Ursure Uexkull		
2025	Magia Exedra	Hazuki Yusa	Mobile	
