= Juri Kimura =

Japanese voice actress

- 木村 珠莉
- Born: Fukuoka Prefecture, Japan
- Occupation: Voice actress
- Years active: 2011–present
- Agent: Tokyo Actor's Consumer's Cooperative Society
- Height: 150.5 cm (4 ft 11 in)
- Children: 1

Juri Kimura (木村 珠莉, Kimura Juri) is a Japanese voice actress affiliated with Tokyo Actor's Consumer's Cooperative Society.

== Filmography ==
=== Anime series ===
2013

- Detective Conan, Saleslady
- Magi: The Labyrinth of Magic, Child B
- Nagi-Asu: A Lull in the Sea, Hama Junior High student B, Nurse

2014

- A Good Librarian Like a Good Shepherd, Schoolgirl C
- Bladedance of Elementalers, Dera
- Celestial Method, Student
- Shirobako, Aoi Miyamori, Mimuji and Roro, Besobeso (ep 19)
- Detective Conan, Woman, Flower shop clerk, Family restaurant clerk
- The Fruit of Grisaia, Operator 2

2015

- Food Wars!: Shokugeki no Soma, Female secretary, Service sector women A, Female narrator
- Gangsta., as Radio voice
- Is It Wrong to Try to Pick Up Girls in a Dungeon?, Lefiya Viridis
- Hello!! Kin-iro Mosaic, Schoolgirl A
- JoJo's Bizarre Adventure: Stardust Crusaders Egypt Arc, Nurse B, Woman, Sonia Doll, Clerk
- Mikagura School Suite, Eruna Ichinomiya
- Plastic Memories, Secretary
- School-Live!, Kei Shidō
- Shimoneta: A Boring World Where the Concept of Dirty Jokes Doesn't Exist, Girl D
- Symphogear GX, Announcer
- Tantei Kageki Milky Holmes TD, Harmony (black)
- The Rolling Girls, Mario, Aichi Tenmusu member (ep 5), Customer, Fukuai
- Venus Project: Climax, Horus Omori
- Wakaba Girl, Yuzuha Kohashi
- The Idolmaster Cinderella Girls 2nd Season, Yumi Aiba
- Is the Order a Rabbit??, Rin Mate (Aoyama's Editor)

2016

- Active Raid, A-ko
- Heavy Object, Lemish
- Mobile Suit Gundam: Iron-Blooded Orphans, Nina Miyamori
- Undefeated Bahamut Chronicle, L Fajula
- Please Tell Me! Galko-chan, Nikuko
- Dimension W, Caster, Rose
- Age 12: A Little Heart-Pounding, Yui Aoi
- Keijo, Midori Morimoto
- Kuromukuro, Beth
- Mob Psycho 100, Mariko

2017

- Seiren, Kyōko Tōno
- Is It Wrong to Try to Pick Up Girls in a Dungeon? On the Side: Sword Oratoria, Lefiya Viridis
- Altair: A Record of Battles, Gertrud
- Nora, Princess, and Stray Cat, Tanaka-chan
- Marvel Future Avengers, Chloe

2018

- Nil Admirari no Tenbin: Teito Genwaku Kitan, Tsugumi Kuze
- Run with the Wind, Hanako Katsuta

2019

- Ao-chan Can't Study!, Miyabi Takaoka
- Granbelm, Nana Rin

=== Anime films ===
- Shirobako: The Movie, Aoi Miyamori

=== Original video animation ===
- Shirobako, The Third Girls Aerial Squad – Elise

=== Original net animation ===
- Monster Strike, Minami Wakaba
- Kare Baka, Akomi Natsuki

=== Video games ===
- Azur Lane, Juneau
- Granblue Fantasy, Karva
- Thousand Memories
- Fire Emblem Fates, Mozu, Nyx
- The Idolmaster Cinderella Girls, Yumi Aiba
- Brave Sword × Blaze Soul, Leviathan
- Honkai Impact 3rd, Eden
- Phantasy Star Online 2 (EPISODE 4), Xiera
- Alice Gear Aegis, Rita Henschel
- Fire Emblem Echoes: Shadows of Valentia, Yuzu
- Fire Emblem Heroes (Feh Channel (2017)), Feh
- Lilycle Rainbow Stage!!! (2015) (Yuno Sakuraba)
- Higurashi No Naku Koro Ni Mei, Miyabi Saionji

=== Radio ===
- Shirobako Radio Box

=== Narration ===
- Kanjani no Shiwake Eight
- Welcome! Alexandros

=== Drama CD ===
- Night Wizard!
- Mujaki no Rakuen (Michiko)

=== Dubbing ===
- Jurassic World (2017 NTV edition), Mosasaurus Announcer (Courtney James Clark)
- Mad Max: Fury Road (2019 THE CINEMA edition), The Dag (Abbey Lee Kershaw)
- Ocean's 8, Eaddy (Eaddy Kiernan)
