= Asami Takano =

Japanese voice actress and singer

- 髙野 麻美
- Born: 25 October 1988 (age 37)
- Occupations: Voice actress; singer
- Years active: 2011–present
- Employer: I'm Enterprise
- Notable work: Shirobako as Misa Tōdō; The Idolmaster Cinderella Girls as Frederica Miyamoto; Gekidol as Aimi Fujita

Asami Takano (Japanese: 髙野 麻美, Hepburn: Takano Asami; born 25 October 1988) is a Japanese voice actress and singer from Tokyo, affiliated with I'm Enterprise. She is known for portraying Misa Tōdō in Shirobako, Frederica Miyamoto in The Idolmaster Cinderella Girls, and Aimi Fujita in Gekidol.

== Biography ==
Asami Takano, a native of Tokyo, was born on 25 October 1988 and educated at the Japan Narration Actor Institute. She joined I'm Enterprise in 2011 and made her career debut on the same year.

In August 2014, Takano was cast as Misa Tōdō in Shirobako, and she reprised her role in the 2020 film adaptation Shirobako: The Movie. In September 2020, she was cast as Aimi Fujita in the Gekidol anime and as Kazuma Aoiki in the spin-off OVA Alice in Deadly School. In March 2022, she was cast as Syakomon in the video game Digimon Survive.

Takano voices Frederica Miyamoto in The Idolmaster Cinderella Girls, a sub-franchise in The Idolmaster franchise. Since then, she has performed as a singer on several Idolmaster music releases, including the 2015 single "The Idolmaster Cinderella Master 033: Frederica Miyamoto" (which charted at #11 in the Oricon Singles Chart) and the 2016 album The Idolmaster Cinderella Master Cute Jewelries! 003 (the series' first album to top the Oricon Albums Chart). She reprised her role in the anime adaptation The Idolmaster Cinderella Girls Theater. In 2017, she performed at Anime Expo's Anisong World Matsuri as part of a performance for the franchise.

Takano is skilled in archery, and she is a kyūdō 1st dan.

== Filmography ==
=== Animated television ===
2011

- Ben-To

2012

- Tanken Driland

2013

- GJ Club

2014

- Brynhildr in the Darkness
- Sabagebu!
- Selector Infected WIXOSS
- Shirobako, Misa Tōdō
- Wolf Girl and Black Prince

2015

- Charlotte
- Hello!! Kin-iro Mosaic
- Magical Girl Lyrical Nanoha ViVid, Mia, Elza, Edix
- Ultimate Otaku Teacher, Yōko

2016

- Handa-kun, Yukari
- Keijo
- Magi: Adventure of Sinbad
- The Morose Mononokean

2017

- Aikatsu Stars!, Sumomo
- Food Wars! Shokugeki no Soma
- The Idolmaster Cinderella Girls Theater, Frederica Miyamoto

2018

- JoJo's Bizarre Adventure: Golden Wind

2021

- Gekidol, Aimi Fujita
- The Night Beyond the Tricornered Window

2022

- JoJo's Bizarre Adventure: Stone Ocean, Sharon
- Princess Connect! Re:Dive, Anna

=== Animated film ===
2020

- Shirobako: The Movie, Misa Tōdō

=== Original video animation ===
- Alice in Deadly School (2021), Kazuma Aoiki

=== Video games ===
2014

- The Idolmaster Cinderella Girls, Frederica Miyamoto

2018

- Princess Connect! Re:Dive, Anna

2020

- Azur Lane, Béarn

2022

- Arknights, Quercus
- Digimon Survive, Syakomon
- Yggdra Resonance, Artrope

== Discography ==
Title	Year	Single details	Peak chart positions		Sales
Title	Year	Single details	JPN	JPN Hot	Sales
"The Idolmaster Cinderella Master 033: Frederica Miyamoto"	2015	Released: 4 February 2015; Label: Nippon Columbia	11	—	—
"—" denotes releases that did not chart or were not released in that region.
