= Shirobako =

Japanese anime television series

- Promotional poster.
- Genre: Comedy, slice of life
- Manga

Shirobako: Kaminoyama Kōkō Animation Dōkōkai
- Written by: Musashino Animation; Kenji Sugihara
- Illustrated by: Mizutama
- Published by: ASCII Media Works
- Magazine: Dengeki Daioh
- Original run: September 27, 2014 – November 27, 2015
- Volumes: 2
- Anime television series
- Directed by: Tsutomu Mizushima
- Written by: Michiko Yokote
- Music by: Shirō Hamaguchi
- Studio: P.A. Works
- Licensed by: AUS: Madman Entertainment; NA: Sentai Filmworks; UK: Anime Limited
- Original network: Tokyo MX, TVA, MBS, TUT, BS Fuji, AT-X, NHK
- Original run: October 9, 2014 – March 26, 2015
- Episodes: 24
- Novel

Shirobako Introduction
- Written by: Michiko Itō; Hajime Tanaka
- Published by: Shueisha
- Imprint: Jump j Books
- Published: January 27, 2015
- Original video animation

Exodus! Exit Tokyo
- Directed by: Tsutomu Mizushima
- Written by: Hiroyuki Yoshino
- Music by: Shirō Hamaguchi
- Studio: P.A. Works
- Released: February 25, 2015
- Runtime: 25 minutes
- Original video animation

The Third Girls Aerial Squad: Falling Angel
- Directed by: Tsutomu Mizushima
- Written by: Hiroyuki Yoshino
- Music by: Shirō Hamaguchi
- Studio: P.A. Works
- Released: July 29, 2015
- Runtime: 25 minutes
- Anime film
- Shirobako: The Movie
- icon

Shirobako is a 24-episode anime television series produced by P.A. Works and directed by Tsutomu Mizushima. It aired in Japan between October 9, 2014, and March 26, 2015. A manga adaptation began serialization in ASCII Media Works's Dengeki Daioh magazine in September 2014, and a novel was published by Shueisha in January 2015. An anime film premiered on February 29, 2020.

The title Shirobako refers to videos that are distributed to the production staff members prior to their release. These videos were at a time distributed as VHS tapes enclosed in white boxes and are still referred to as "white boxes" (thus the meaning of shirobako) despite the fact that the white enclosures are no longer in use.

== Plot ==
Aoi Miyamori and her four best friends, Ema Yasuhara, Shizuka Sakaki, Misa Tōdō, and Midori Imai, were all part of their school's animation club, promising to make an anime together. Years later, Aoi is now working as a production assistant for the animation production company, Musashino Animation, where Ema also works as an animator, while Shizuka, Misa, and Midori are working as a voice actress, 3D graphics artist, and an aspiring writer respectively.

The story focuses on Aoi and her team at Musashino Animation as they work on two different anime projects, an original anime series and a manga adaptation, and face the obstacles introduced by each project.

== Characters ==
The main cast of Shirobako. From left to right: Misa Tōdō, Shizuka Sakaki, Aoi Miyamori, Ema Yasuhara and Midori Imai.

=== Main characters ===
Aoi Miyamori (宮森 あおい, Miyamori Aoi)
Voiced by: Juri Kimura (Japanese); Alyssa Marek (English)
She is a production assistant of Musashino Animation and later the production manager. She is a former member of the Kaminoyama High School animation club and is called "Aoi" by Ema and Shizuka, nicknamed "Oi" by Misa and Midori, and referred to as Myāmori (みゃーもり) by Erika. Having worked at Musashino Animation for a year-and-a-half, she has great driving skills and is acknowledged by her coworkers Erika Yano and Tatsuya Ochiai as suitable for the production industry. However, she admits that she has not officially decided exactly what job she will take in the anime industry.
Ema Yasuhara (安原 絵麻, Yasuhara Ema)
Voiced by: Haruka Yoshimura (Japanese); Savanna Menzel (English)
She is a key animator at Musashino Animation and a former member of the Kaminoyama High School animation club. She is later promoted to the position of assistant general animation supervisor for The Third Aerial Girls Squad. She admires the work of character designer and general animation supervisor Rinko Ogasawara, who is her higher-up. She has a secret that she shares with Iguchi: they do workout dances on the roof together.
Shizuka Sakaki (坂木 しずか, Sakaki Shizuka)
Voiced by: Haruka Chisuga (Japanese); Rachael Messer (English)
She is a voice actress at Akaoni Production and a former member of the Kaminoyama High School animation club. She is called "Zuka" by her friends. She also works part-time as a waitress at a pub. Her first notable role was as Lucy Weller, a character featured in the final episode of Musashino Animation's The Third Girls Aerial Squad anime adaptation.
Misa Tōdō (藤堂 美沙, Tōdō Misa)
Voiced by: Asami Takano (Japanese); Juliet Simmons (English)
She is an aspiring 3D computer graphics operator and a former member of the Kaminoyama High School animation club. She once worked at computer graphics studio Super Media Creations, but later quits due to her dissatisfaction with her work and finds employment at Studio Kanabun. Nicknamed "Mii" by her friends, she was initially confused in choosing between working in the fields of 2D and 3D, but ultimately chose the latter. She was inspired to work because of Ema's drawings. She dislikes working on projects that have no plot or emotion behind them, which is the reason she leaves Super Media Creations, as she only designed wheels during her time there.
Midori Imai (今井 みどり, Imai Midori)
Voiced by: Hitomi Ōwada (Japanese); Taylor Fono (English)
She is a university student and aspiring story writer. She is a former member of the Kaminoyama High School animation club and is nicknamed "Rii" by her friends. She is the youngest of the group and continues to strive to reach her goal. Her enthusiasm on researching earns her the nickname "Diesel" after she creates a helpful guide for Musashino Animation when they make an informal request for information on engines for Exodus!. She later finds employment at Musashino as a setting instructor, and later assists in the script ordering.

=== Musashino Animation ===
Production desk

- Yutaka Honda (本田 豊, Honda Yutaka; Voiced by: Shūya Nishiji (Japanese); Clint Bickham (English)): Production manager of Musashino Animation. He decides to leave Musashino Animation to become a pastry chef. After his departure, he is revealed to have lost much weight during his sporadic pastry delivery visits to Musashino Animation.
- Tarō Takanashi (高梨 太郎, Takanashi Tarō; Voiced by: Hiroyuki Yoshino (Japanese); Greg Cote (English)): Production assistant of Musashino Animation. He is later promoted to chief production assistant after Honda's departure. He is known around the company for being irresponsible, loud and being extremely protective of his ego and reputation. This often earns him rebukes from Aoi and Erika, as well as annoyance or indifference from all other characters.
- Erika Yano (矢野 エリカ, Yano Erika; Voiced by: Yuri Yamaoka (Japanese); Shanae'a Moore (English)): Production assistant of Musashino Animation. She is Tatsuya and Aoi's closest co-worker, known for a short temper and generous attitude. She lives in Utsunomiya with her sick father, which causes problems with workloads.
- Tatsuya Ochiai (落合 達也, Ochiai Tatsuya; Voiced by: Yoshitsugu Matsuoka (Japanese); Rob Mungle (English)): Production assistant of Musashino Animation. He rarely speaks to anyone but Erika although he is respected around the office. He leaves Musashino Animation to become the production manager at Studio Canaan after a former colleague of his requests his assistance.
- Tsubaki Andō (安藤 つばき, Andō Tsubaki; Voiced by: Ikumi Hayama (Japanese); Margaret McDonald (English)): New production assistant of Musashino Animation and an otaku. She is very enthusiastic to the point where she forgets what is important.
- Sara Satō (佐藤 沙羅, Satō Sara; Voiced by: Madoka Yonezawa (Japanese); Avery Smithhart (English)): New production assistant of Musashino Animation. She is very responsible, but is horrible with directions.
- Daisuke Hiraoka (平岡 大輔, Hiraoka Daisuke; Voiced by: Yūsuke Kobayashi (Japanese); Bryson Baugus (English)): New production assistant of Musashino Animation after Honda's departure and Tarō's subsequent promotion, although he is in truth very experienced. He is known for being easily annoyed and standoffish. His experience lends him connections to various companies and people in the show, although all of them are mediocre at what they do. When he joins Musashino, due to past "trauma," he initially believes that anime just needs to get finished and that quality does not matter. He later comes around and starts to appreciate what professionals put into their work and that quality does matter.

Animation department

- Rinko Ogasawara (小笠原 綸子, Ogasawara Rinko; Voiced by: Ai Kayano (Japanese); Elissa Cuellar (English)): Star key animator, character designer and general animation supervisor at Musashino Animation. She was the character designer for Exodus!, but after its last episode, she decides to return to her roots as key animator, inspired by Shigeru's horse animations. She is known for her calm demeanor and fashion: gothic dresses. She is also an accomplished softball player.
- Yumi Iguchi (井口 祐未, Iguchi Yumi; Voiced by: Manami Numakura (Japanese); Natalie Rial (English)): Key animator at Musashino Animation. The assistant general animation supervisor of Exodus! and the character designer of The Third Aerial Girls Squad. After her character designs for The Third Aerial Girls Squad were rejected multiple times by Nogame, Rinko lets her in on her secret place: the softball range. Afterwards, she no longer wears typical casual wear, but instead a pinkish kimono with purple stripes. She also does workout dances with Ema on the roof, a secret between the two.
- Akane Uchida (内田 茜, Uchida Akane; Voiced by: Rie Takahashi (Japanese); Carolyn Medrano (English)): Key animator at Musashino Animation.
- Hikaru Hotta (堀田 光, Hotta Hikaru; Voiced by: Riki Kitazawa (Japanese); Nathan Wilson (English)): Key animator at Musashino Animation and Endō's junior. He is a massive proponent of hand-drawn animation being superior to CG animation.
- Ai Kunogi (久乃木 愛, Kunogi Ai; Voiced by: Shiori Izawa (Japanese); Hilary Haag (English)): In-between animator at Musashino Animation. She is later promoted to key animator for The Third Aerial Girls Squad. She is extremely nervous and shy, almost never completing a full word. This leaves her very much attached to Ema, who seemingly magically interprets what she wants to say. She is also deathly afraid of insects.
- Shigeru Sugie (杉江 茂, Sugie Shigeru; Voiced by: Motoi Koyanagi, Shinya Takahashi (young) (Japanese); Carl Masterson (English)): Senior key animator at Musashino Animation. He was once the character designer for the now-defunct Musashino Pictures. His old age means he no longer has the speed to work on Musashino Animation's main projects, but he proves crucial to the completion of the final episode of Exodus!, where he teaches the other animators to animate horses, a lost talent by the time Shirobako takes place. In addition to horses, he can design and animate many other animals.

Other staff

- Masato Marukawa (丸川 正人, Marukawa Masato; Voiced by: Wataru Takagi, Yūsuke Kobayashi (young) (Japanese); James Belcher, Daniel Regojo (young) (English)): The president of Musashino Animation. He was once the production desk at the now-defunct Musashino Pictures. He is more often than not seen cooking absurd amounts of food for his employees. In the past, he had a distinctive hippie look, with long hair past his shoulders and a headband, but in the present, he is nearly bald and has a distinctive gap between his front two teeth. His name and design are based on anime producer and entrepreneur Masao Maruyama.
- Yuka Okitsu (興津 由佳, Okitsu Yuka; Voiced by: Mai Nakahara (Japanese); Genevieve Simmons (English)): The general manager of Musashino Animation and a former production assistant. She does not tolerate smoking or violence in the office, and is skilled at defusing situations as well. The police have nicknamed her "Woman of the Speed of Sound", as she will drive over the speed limit to deliver episode tapes on time to broadcasting companies around Japan.
- Jun Watanabe (渡辺 隼, Watanabe Jun; Voiced by: Masaya Matsukaze (Japanese); Blake Jackson (English)): Line producer at Musashino Animation. He is often nicknamed "Nabe-P" by his colleagues.
- Nao Shinkawa (新川 奈緒, Shinkawa Nao; Voiced by: Mari Hino (Japanese); Shelby Blocker (English)): Color setter at Musashino Animation.
- Yoshiki Sakura (佐倉 良樹, Sakura Yoshiki; Voiced by: Kengo Takanashi (Japanese); Houston Hayes (English)): Director of photography at Musashino Animation.
- Yūichirō Shimoyanagi (下柳 雄一郎, Shimoyanagi Yūichirō; Voiced by: Junji Majima (Japanese); Michael Wronski (English)): 3D Director at Musashino Animation. He loves Idepon, citing it as his inspiration to work in anime, a common ground with Ryōsuke Endō, a key animator.
- Chiemi Dōmoto (堂本 知恵美, Dōmoto Chiemi; Voiced by: Shizuka Itō (Japanese); Carli Mosier (English)): In-between animation inspector at Musashino Animation.

=== Production staff ===
Directing staff

- Seiichi Kinoshita (木下 誠一, Kinoshita Seiichi; Voiced by: Nobuyuki Hiyama (Japanese); Mark Laskowski (English)): The director of Exodus! and The Third Girls Aerial Squad. He loves fatty foods, leaving the air conditioner on, and not working. His work style often leads to him suddenly changing the story or refusing to work on his storyboards, leading to delayed production. He has a fatal flaw when people reference his greatest failure in the past, Jiggly Jiggly Heaven. He is also known for celebrating losing weight by eating unhealthy foods, although he measures this in minuscule amounts of grams. His character and design are in part based on Seiji Mizushima.
- Masashi Yamada (山田 昌志, Yamada Masashi; Voiced by: Kenji Hamada (Japanese); Ty Mahany (English)): The episode director of Exodus!'s fourth and ninth episodes, and an episode director for The Third Girls Aerial Squad.
- Hironori Madoka (円 宏則, Madoka Hironori; Voiced by: Hironori Saitō (Japanese); Adam Noble (English)): The episode director of Exodus!'s third episode, and The Third Aerial Girls Squad's third and seventh episodes.
- Hiroshi Iketani (池谷 ひろし, Iketani Hiroshi; Voiced by: Masayoshi Sugawara (Japanese); Jack Ivy (English)): The episode director of The Third Aerial Girls Squad's fifth episode. He is contacted as an emergency by Erika, formerly known as "the bearded hermit", with barely any money. He is used as comic relief as he often attempts to escape Studio Taitanic with many different ways which included tunneling out and escaping through the vents, always only to be caught by Erika smiling at him at the end.
- Zaruyoshi Yakushiji (薬師寺 笊良, Yakushiji Zaruyoshi; Voiced by: Daiki Hamano (Japanese); John Swasey (English)): The former episode director of The Third Aerial Girls Aerial Squad's fifth episode, hailing from Studio Taitanic. He is completely disinterested in working with Seiichi or anime in general, referencing Jiggly Jiggly Heaven and signing episode cuts without having seen any of it. He then disappears after meeting with Musashino Animation.

Sound department (R&B Studio)

- Yoshikazu Inanami (稲浪 良和, Inanami Yoshikazu; Voiced by: Mitsuo Iwata (Japanese); Mike Yager (English)): Director of audiography.
- Eri Nakata (中田 恵理, Nakata Eri; Voiced by: Shizuka Itō (Japanese); Kelly Greenshield (English)): Sound production supervisor.
- Atsushi Yamabuchi (山渕 篤, Yamabuchi Atsushi; Voiced by: Ikuji Nose): Mixer.
- Asuka Fuji (藤 明日香, Fuji Asuka; Voiced by: Rie Takahashi (Japanese); Carolyn Medrano (English)): Assistant mixer.
- Takumi Ōyama (大山 匠, Ōyama Takumi; Voiced by: Shinya Takahashi): Sound effects engineer. He also works at Sawara Studio.

Freelance animators

- Ryōsuke Endō (遠藤 亮介, Endō Ryōsuke; Voiced by: Shinobu Matsumoto): Freelance key animator. The animation supervisor for the Exodus!'s third and eighth episodes. He has a rivalry with Misato Segawa. He gets annoyed when other characters voice their negative opinions of his work. He loves Idepon, citing it as his inspiration to work in anime, a common ground with Yūichirō Shimoyanagi, a CG animator.
- Misato Segawa (瀬川 美里, Segawa Misato; Voiced by: Kotomi Yamakawa (Japanese); Patricia Duran (English)): Freelance key animator. The animation supervisor for the Exodus!'s fourth and ninth episodes. Ryōsuke Endō considers her a rival, as they have common work history together. She is very diligent, often working throughout the night to exhaustion.
- Mitsuhide Kisa (木佐 光秀, Kisa Mitsuhide; Voiced by: Masayoshi Sugawara (Japanese); Scott Gibbs (English)): Freelance key animator. He is very lazy, not working until he is "in his groove", and sleeping well into the afternoon. He is also an avid biker.

Voice actors

- Mei Nakaharu (中春 鳴, Nakaharu Mei; Voiced by: Mai Nakahara (Japanese); Luci Christian (English)): Voice actress. Voices Akane in Exodus!. Her name and appearance are nearly identical to her voice actress Mai Nakahara.
- Suzuka Itō (伊藤 鈴鹿, Itō Suzuka; Voiced by: Shizuka Itō (Japanese); Allison Sumrall (English)): Voice actress. Voices Aya in Exodus! and Catherine Weller in The Third Aerial Girls Squad. Her name and appearance are nearly identical to her voice actress Shizuka Itō.
- Mui Kayana (茅菜 夢衣, Kayana Mui; Voiced by: Ai Kayano (Japanese); Brittney Karbowski (English)): Voice actress. Voices Arupin in Exodus!. Her name and appearance are nearly identical to her voice actress Ai Kayano.
- Yuuna Sakashita (坂下 裕奈, Sakashita Yuuna; Voiced by: Manami Numakura): Voice actress. Voices Onee-san in Exodus!.
- Kyōko Suzuki (鈴木 京子, Suzuki Kyōko; Voiced by: Hisako Kanemoto (Japanese); Christina Kelly (English)): Voice actress. Voices Aria Hitotose in The Third Aerial Girls Squad. Her design is based on Juri Kimura, the voice actress of Aoi Miyamori.
- Eri Asagami (浅上 エリ, Asagami Eri; Voiced by: Manami Numakura (Japanese); Luci Christian (English)): Voice actress. Voices Noa Ashkenage in The Third Aerial Girls Squad.
- Ayano Makise (牧瀬 彩乃, Makise Ayano; Voiced by: Madoka Yonezawa (Japanese); Mai Le (English)): Voice actress. Voices Christine Waldegard in The Third Aerial Girls Squad.
- Hiroko Tokiwa (常盤 ひろ子, Tokiwa Hiroko; Voiced by: Yuri Yamaoka (Japanese); Kelly Greenshield (English)): Voice actress. Voices Tatiana Yakovlef in The Third Aerial Girls Squad.
- Rina Sōma (相馬 りな, Sōma Rina; Voiced by: Yukari Tamura (Japanese); Mai Le (English)): Top voice actress. Her design is a play on her voice actress Yukari Tamura.

Other staff

- Gōtarō Katsuragi (葛城 剛太郎, Katsuragi Gōtarō; Voiced by: Nobuyuki Kobushi): Western Entertainment's producer.
- Wataru Nakabayashi (中林 渉, Nakabayashi Wataru; Voiced by: Kazuyuki Okitsu (Japanese); Kyle Colby Jones (English)): Editor.

=== Others ===
Other companies

- Tatsuya Hantō (半藤 達也, Hantō Tatsuya; Voiced by: Jirō Saitō): The editor-in-chief for the company that produces and distributes The Third Aerial Girls Squad.
- Shinsuke Chazawa (茶沢 信輔, Chazawa Shinsuke; Voiced by: Jun Fukushima (Japanese); Cameron Bausch (English)): An editor for the company that produces and distributes The Third Aerial Girls Squad. Later fired after keeping Nogame in the dark about Musashino's attempts to meet him. He approves everything that the cast asks him without consulting Nogame, often seen texting on his cell phone during meetings with Musashino Animation. He also abruptly leaves his meetings, interrupting conversations to remark on how he scheduled another meeting, although it is heavily implied he is actually performing leisure activities, such as going to a golfing range. He is known for his catch phrase "funny story". He says this extremely liberally, using it in emails and normal conversation where there is no story to be told.
- Hisamitsu Isokawa (磯川 久光, Isokawa Hisamitsu; Voiced by: Shinji Kawada): The president and chief production assistant of A.C Tsuchinoko, and Erika and Hiraoka's former classmate in technical school.
- Kouichi Tateishi (立石 孝一, Tateishi Kouichi; Voiced by: Yuuki Hayashi (Japanese); Alan Brinks (English)): The president of Super Media Creations and Misa's former boss.
- Nobuaki Nakagaichi (中垣内 伸昭, Nakagaichi Nobuaki; Voiced by: Masayoshi Sugawara (Japanese); Orlanders Jones (English)): The president of Studio Kanabun and Misa's current boss.
- Toshiyasu Kawano (河野 幸泰, Kawano Toshiyasu; Voiced by: Yutaka Aoyama): Sound effects engineer for the sound department at Sawara Studio.
- Masahiko Inami (伊波 政彦, Inami Masahiko; Voiced by: Wataru Takagi (Japanese); John Gremillion (English)): The president of The Born. He is known for being blunt, often refusing interview candidates for being nervous or saying certain phrases ("I'll do anything" is a particular one) He is also forgetful, loud and wears a baseball uniform.
- Keiji Takekura (竹倉 圭司, Takekura Keiji; Voiced by: Makoto Yasumura (Japanese); Justan Doran (English)): The chief production assistant of The Born. He is Masahiko's foil, often reminding him he is being far too demanding or brusque.
- Onodera (小野寺, Onodera; Voiced by: Taishi Murata (Japanese); James Marler (English)): An episode director working for The Born and a former key animator. He is noted for being "nocturnal", not showing up to work until the late afternoon.
- Tomigaya (富ヶ谷; Voiced by: Mitsuo Iwata (Japanese); Mike Haimoto (English)): Aoi's rival, who works at G.I Staff (a combination of Production I.G and J.C. Staff) and frequently races her while on errands for the same people.
- Isamu Momose (百瀬 勇, Momose Isamu; Voiced by: Fumihiko Inoue, Kazuyuki Okitsu (young) (Japanese); Justan Doran (English)): The president of Komoro Studio. He was once the color setter for the now-defunct Musashino Pictures.
- Masato Onoue (尾之上 将人, Onoue Masato; Voiced by: Itaru Yamamoto (Japanese); Josh Morrison (English)): Head of the Yotaka Bookshop Organization.
- Nobuhiro Sakurada (桜田 伸広, Sakurada Nobuhiro; Voiced by: Makoto Yasumura (Japanese); Kyle Colby Jones (English)): Producer for Big Japan Advertising.
- Yasuhiro Mizuyama (水山 康宏, Mizuyama Yasuhiro; Voiced by: Wataru Takagi (Japanese); David Harbold (English)): Producer for a firm advertising The Third Girls Aerial Squad.
- Kenichi Mimura (三村 健一, Mimura Kenichi; Voiced by: Kazuyuki Okitsu (Japanese); Gareth West (English)): The head production assistant at Studio Taitanic. He apparently does nothing at work, sleeping when Erika enters Studio Taitanic and not even turning on the Internet.
- Sugesuke Enjō (遠城 営助, Enjō Sugesuke; Voiced by: Nobuo Tobita (Japanese); David Matranga (English)): Producer for Bukkomi Games. He, along with Takumi Yarase and Tsuyoshi Makurada, do not care about The Third Aerial Girls Squad, only gaining money for their respective company. Sugesuke particularly wants well-known voice actors in The Third Aerial Girls Squad for to draw extra publicity for games that accompany The Third Aerial Girls Squad. He is forced to agree to Jun's voice actors for the sake of quality.
- Takumi Yarase (屋良瀬 匠, Yarase Takumi; Voiced by: Mitsuaki Madono (Japanese); Anthony Hunter (English)): Producer for Gorioshi Music. He, along with Sugesuke Enjō and Tsuyoshi Makurada, do not care about The Third Aerial Girls Squad, only gaining money for their respective company. Takumi particularly wants voice actors with good singing capabilities in The Third Aerial Girls Squad so his company can sell more records. He is forced to agree to Jun's voice actors for the sake of quality.
- Tsuyoshi Makurada (枕田 強, Makurada Tsuyoshi; Voiced by: Takehito Koyasu (Japanese); Jovan Jackson (English)): Creative producer for DK Race. He, along with Sugesuke Enjō and Takumi Yarase, do not care about The Third Aerial Girls Squad, only gaining money for their respective company. Tsuyoshi particularly wants physically attractive voice actors in The Third Aerial Girls Squad so his company will have larger panels at conventions. He is forced to agree to Jun's voice actors for the sake of quality.

Other characters

- Mimuji and Roro (ミムジー&ロロ, Mimujī & Roro; Voiced by: Juri Kimura): Aoi's dolls who she occasionally imagines being alive. Mimuji is a female doll with an eyepatch who wears a long purple and black dress. She is ignorant to the anime creation process and finds the meetings and work boring. She also bullies Roro and serves as the negative voice for Aoi, telling her to quit work and question why she is working in anime. Roro is a white teddy bear who explains the anime creation process. He is the positive voice for Aoi, reminding her why she is working in anime. In Shirobako's final episode credits, Ai Kunogi sees Mimuji and Roro as being alive, which stuns her.
- Kaori Miyamori (宮森 かおり, Miyamori Kaori; Voiced by: Satomi Moriya (Japanese); Heidi Hinkel (English)): Aoi's older sister, who unhappily works at a Shinkin bank. She lives in the country, and acts like a stereotypical tourist during her visit to Tokyo, embarrassing Midori. She questions whether Musashino Animation is a legitimate company, but ultimately approves of Aoi.
- Shimeji Maitake (舞茸 しめじ, Maitake Shimeji; Voiced by: Kazuyuki Okitsu): The head writer of Exodus! and one of the writers for The Third Aerial Girls Squad. His name is based on real-life novel author Kinoko Nasu, while his appearance is similar to that of real-life screenwriter Hiroyuki Yoshino.
- Yūji Atsumi (渥美 祐治, Atsumi Yūji; Voiced by: Daiki Hamano (Japanese); Jason Duga (English)): Art director for The Third Girls Aerial Squad. He is known for his art direction featuring clouds, as well as his forehead, which is longer than any other character's in the show,
- Masahiro Ōkura (大倉 正弘, Ōkura Masahiro; Voiced by: Taketora (Japanese); David Wald (English)): An art director who is hired to handle certain background scenes for The Third Girls Aerial Squad. He was once a key animator for the now-defunct Musashino Pictures. He is a talented painter. His character and design are in part based upon Hiromasa Ogura.
- Mari Tateo (縦尾 まり, Tateo Mari; Voiced by: Mari Yokoo (Japanese); Shelley Calene-Black (English)): A former voice actress and Shizuka's mentor.
- Mitsuaki Kanno (菅野 光明, Kanno Mitsuaki; Voiced by: Shōto Kashii (Japanese); Mark Mendelsohn (English)): A high-profile animator who was involved in several famous anime works. His name is a play on that of real-life director and animator Hideaki Anno, and his appearance is similar to that of Anno as well. As with Anno, he is most well known for being the art director for a popular mecha anime. In Anno's case, this is Neon Genesis Evangelion.
- Mayumi Endō (遠藤麻佑美, Endō Mayumi; Voiced by: Chinami Hashimoto (Japanese); Kelly Greenshield (English)): Ryōsuke's wife.
- Mrs. Miyamori (あおいの母, Aoi no haha; Voiced by: Yuka Keichou (Japanese); Christie Guidry (English)): Aoi and Kaori's mother.
- Mrs. Yasuhara (絵麻の母親, Ema no haha; Voiced by: Mari Hino (Japanese); Shelley Calene-Black (English)): Ema's mother.
- Mrs. Sugie (杉江の妻, Sugie no tsuma; Voiced by: Momoe Kishimoto, Mai Nakahara (young) (Japanese); Joanne Bonasso (English)): Sugie's wife, who he met at the now-defunct Musashino Pictures, where she worked as an in-between animation supervisor.
- Kōji Sagamori (佐賀森 幸次, Sagamori Kōji; Voiced by: Ikuji Nose (Japanese); Luis Galindo (English)): The art director of the now-defunct Musashino Pictures. He is instantly recognizable from his large mustache and his short temper, which he often directed at Masato Marukawa, who as a production assistant requested the art department draw certain things, an unheard-of action in anime.
- Takezō Nogame (野亀 武蔵, Nogame Takezō; Voiced by: Takahiro Sakurai (Japanese); Joe Daniels (English)): The original creator of The Third Girls Aerial Squad. Unlike any other character in the show, he appears to regularly wear traditional Japanese kimonos. His name is based on manga artist Takeshi Nogami.

=== Anime characters ===
Exodus!

- Akane (あかね, Akane; Voiced by: Mai Nakahara): The leader of the idol group Tracy, and one of the protagonists of Exodus!. She is voiced by Mei Nakaharu.
- Aya (あや, Aya; Voiced by: Shizuka Itō): A member of the idol group Tracy, and one of the protagonists of Exodus!. She is voiced by Suzuka Itō.
- Arupin (あるぴん, Arupin; Voiced by: Ai Kayano): A member of the idol group Tracy, and one of the protagonists of Exodus!, who is 29 years old despite publicizing her age as 17. She is voiced by Mui Kayana.
- Onee-san (お姉さん, Onee-san; Voiced by: Manami Numakura): A shady businesswoman who is in frequent contact with Tracy, who appears to be an antagonist of Exodus!. She is voiced by Yuuna Sakashita.
- Miho Koigakubo (恋ヶ窪 三保, Koigakubo Miho; Voiced by: Kotomi Yamakawa): An ambitious police inspector transferred from South Africa, who is assigned to track down Akane, Aya, and Arupin on suspicion of murder. She appears to be an antagonist of Exodus!.
- Taguchi (タグチ, Taguchi; Voiced by: Jun Fukushima): The manager of Tracy, who winds up being murdered and his death pinned on his own idol group.

The Third Girls Aerial Squad

- Aria Hitotose (春夏秋冬 ありあ, Hitotose Aria; Voiced by: Hisako Kanemoto): The main protagonist of The Third Girls Aerial Squad, and a pilot from Japan, sardonically nicknamed "Ice Doll" for her cold and calculating personality. A member of the 307 Aerial Squad, or "Hell Alice", she flies a Mitsubishi F-1. She is voiced by Kyōko Suzuki.
- Catherine Weller (キャサリン・ウェラー, Kyasarin Werā; Voiced by: Shizuka Itō): A pilot from America and one of Aria's allies. A member of Hell Alice, she flies a McDonnell Douglas F-4 Phantom II. She is voiced by Suzuka Itō.
- Christine Waldegård (クリスティーネ・ワルデガルド, Kurisutīne Warudegarudo; Voiced by: Madoka Yonezawa): A pilot from Sweden and one of Aria's allies. A member of Hell Alice, she flies a Saab 37 Viggen. She is voiced by Ayano Makise.
- Noa Ashkenage (ノア・アシュケナージ, Noa Ashukenāji; Voiced by: Manami Numakura): A pilot from Israel and one of Aria's allies. A member of Hell Alice, she flies an IAI Kfir. She is voiced by Eri Asagami.
- Tatiana Yakovlef (タチアナ・ヤコブレフ, Tachiana Yakoburefu; Voiced by: Yuri Yamaoka): A pilot from an unknown country, and one of Aria's allies. A member of Hell Alice, she flies a Mikoyan-Gurevich MiG-23. She is voiced by Hiroko Tokiwa.
- Valroph (ヴァロア司令, Valois; Voiced by: Ikumi Hayama): The commanding officer of Chofu Base and the leader of Hell Alice.
- Olivia (オリビエ, Olivier; Voiced by: Mai Nakahara): A lieutenant colonel and the squadron leader of Hell Alice, who sacrifices herself to save Aria and Catherine.
- Lye (ラーイ, Lye; Voiced by: Kenji Hamada): A rear general who is responsible for overseeing and repairing Hell Alice's aircraft.
- Elise (エリーゼ, Elise; Voiced by: Juri Kimura): An apparent representative of the Clow Corporation, which supplies Chofu Base with gathered parts.
- Lucy Weller (ルーシー・ウェラー, Rūshī Werā; Voiced by: Haruka Chisuga): Catherine's younger sister, who was specifically created for an anime-original scenario for the adaptation. She is voiced by Shizuka.
- Myers (マイヤーズ, Myers; Voiced by: Shinobu Matsumoto): A pilot who participates in the attack against Midway Pillar, during which he is shot down and killed.

== Media ==
=== Print media ===
A manga adaptation titled Shirobako: Kaminoyama Kōkō Animation Dōkōkai (SHIROBAKO 〜上山高校アニメーション同好会〜, Shirobako: Kaminoyama High School Animation Club), written by Kenji Sugihara and illustrated by Mizutama, began serialization in the November 2014 issue of ASCII Media Works' Dengeki Daioh magazine sold on September 27, 2014. A short manga based on the show's fictional series The Third Girls Aerial Squad was distributed by Takeshi Nogami at Comiket 88 in August 2015.

A 224-page novel adaptation, titled Shirobako Introduction and written by Michiko Itō and Hajime Tanka, was published by Shueisha under their Jump j Books imprint on January 27, 2015.

=== Anime ===
The 24-episode anime television series was produced by P.A. Works. It was directed by Tsutomu Mizushima and written by Michiko Yokote, with the music produced by Shirō Hamaguchi. The series aired on Tokyo MX between October 9, 2014, and March 26, 2015, and was simulcast by Crunchyroll. Original video animation (OVA) episodes featuring fictional anime are included on the series' third and seventh Blu-ray Disc/DVD volumes, released on February 25, 2015, and July 29, 2015, respectively. Sentai Filmworks has licensed the series for release in North America. Madman Entertainment licensed the series in Australia and New Zealand. The complete collection Blu-ray was released on October 13, 2020, with an English dub.

For the first twelve episodes, the opening theme is "Colorful Box" by Yoko Ishida, while the ending theme is "Animetic Love Letter" sung by Juri Kimura, Haruka Yoshimura, and Haruka Chisuga. For episode one, the opening theme is "I'm Sorry Exodus" (あいむそーりーEXODUS, Aimu Sōrī Ekusodasu) sung by Tracy (Mai Nakahara, Shizuka Itō, and Ai Kayano), which is later used as the opening theme for the first OVA episode. For episodes 13 onwards, the opening theme is "Takarabako (Treasure Box)" (宝箱-TREASURE BOX-) by Masami Okui, while the ending theme is "Platinum Jet" (プラチナジェット, Purachina Jetto) by Donuts Quintet (Kimura, Yoshimura, Chisuga, Asami Takano, and Hitomi Ōwada). The ending theme for episode 19 is "Yama Harinezumi Andes Chucky" (山はりねずみアンデスチャッキー, Yama Harinezumi Andesu Chakkī; Mountain Hedgehog Andes Chucky) by Miyuki Kunitake. The ending theme for the first original video animation episode is "C Melo kara Ai o Komete" (Cメロから愛を込めて) by Mai Nakahara. For the second original video animation episode, the opening theme is "Alice in Blue" (アリス・イン・ブルー) and the ending theme is "Angel Fly"; both songs are by Rita.

At the "Musashi-Sakai x Shirobako Harumatsuri" event held in Tokyo on April 28, 2018, it was announced that the series would receive an all-new anime film, with the main staff from the anime series returning to reprise their roles. The film premiered in Japan on February 29, 2020. On November 17, 2020, it was announced Eleven Arts has licensed the film. The film premiered in North American theaters on August 10, 2021.

== Reception ==
In a review by Anime News Network, reviewer Rose Bridges gave the series an A rating and lauded it for its concept and character development. She particularly praised the characterization and development of main character Aoi Miyamori. She went on to say that "Shirobako's presence brightens the anime world, so I hope this isn't the end. I'm glad it set itself up so that it doesn't have to be." Bridges also alluded to the possibility of a second season several times in her review.

Shirobako won the Animation Kobe Television Award in 2015. It also won Animation of the Year at the 2016 Tokyo Anime Awards and Animation Department Committee Recommended Works Award at the 19th Japan Media Arts Festival.
