= Nobuyuki Kobushi =

Japanese voice actor (born 1974)

- こぶしのぶゆき
- Born: 小伏 伸之; Kobushi Nobuyuki; September 8, 1974 (age 51); Kyoto Prefecture
- Occupation: Voice actor
- Years active: 2000-present
- Agent: Ken Production
- Notable credit(s): Sword Art Online as Tecchi, Shirobako as Gōtarō Katsuragi
- Height: 165 cm (5 ft 5 in)

Nobuyuki Kobushi (こぶし のぶゆき, Kobushi Nobuyuki) (real/former name in kanji: 小伏 伸之) is a Japanese voice actor. He is affiliated with Ken Production. He is originally from Kyoto Prefecture.

== Filmography ==
=== Television animation ===
- Buddy Complex, Don Naher
- Le Chevalier D'Eon, Count Cagliostro
- Lucky Star, Kiyotaka Narumi
- Hanbun no Tsuki ga Noboru Sora, Tsukasa Sekoguchi
- Hyōka, Quiz Study Group President
- Rockman EXE Beast, SherbetMan (ep. 9), Announcement (ep. 12)
- Sword Art Online, Tecchi
- The Melancholy of Haruhi Suzumiya, Computer Research Society President
- The Story of Saiunkoku, Official Wa
- To Your Eternity, Uroy
- Transformers: Micron Legend, Jim, Stepper
- Shirobako, Gōtarō Katsuragi

=== Original video animation (OVA) ===
- I"s Pure, Yasumasa Teratani

=== Video games ===
- Legend of Zelda: Skyward Sword

=== Dubbing ===
- Cellular, Chad (Eric Christian Olsen)
- Cyrus, Cyrus Fawcett (Jonah Hill)
- Unaccompanied Minors, Timothy "Beef" Wellington (Brett Kelly)
