= Digimon Survive =

2022 video game

- Developer: Hyde (Note: Development duties originally handled by Witchcraft (2018–2020))
- Publisher: Bandai Namco Entertainment
- Director: Yusuke Shimada
- Producer: Kazumasa Habu
- Artist: Ukumo Uiti
- Composer: Tomoki Miyoshi
- Series: Digimon
- Engine: Unity (Note: Originally a custom built engine owned by Witchcraft, with Hyde using Unity due to not having access to said custom engine)
- Platforms: Nintendo Switch; PlayStation 4; Windows; Xbox One
- Release: Nintendo Switch, PS4: JP: July 28, 2022; WW: July 29, 2022; Windows, Xbox One: WW: July 29, 2022
- Genres: Visual novel, tactical role-playing
- Mode: Single-player

Digimon Survive (Note: Digimon Survive (デジモンサヴァイブ, Dejimon Savaibu)) is a visual novel with tactical role-playing game elements developed by Hyde and published by Bandai Namco Entertainment for Nintendo Switch, PlayStation 4, Windows, and Xbox One.

Announced in 2018, the game was originally developed on a much smaller budget compared to previous Digimon games. However, as development progressed, producer Kazumasa Habu realized that their original budget and smaller studio was inadequate to achieve his vision, resulting in the game being re-developed from scratch and switched to a different game engine. This, along with the impact of the COVID-19 pandemic, resulted in the game being delayed from a previously announced 2019 release date.

The game was released in Japan on July 28, 2022, for PlayStation 4 and Nintendo Switch then released Windows and Xbox One on the following day alongside worldwide in other territories. The game received mixed reviews from critics and fans.

== Gameplay ==
Digimon Survive is a visual novel with tactical role-playing elements. Player choices influence the direction of the story, including the Digimon's evolution process. Multiple playthroughs can result in different paths and different digivolutions. The game features multiple endings and should wrong choices be made, characters will be killed. The game is split into multiple types of gameplay, such as "Drama Parts", "Search Action", "Free Action", and "Free Battle". During "Drama Parts" the game proceeds as a text adventure to tell the story. In "Search Actions", the player searches for a way to survive. In "Free Action", the player chooses where to go and whom to talk during a limited window of time. During "Free Battle", the player can enter certain areas to train their Digimon and collect items.

== Plot ==
Takuma Momozuka, Minoru Hinata, Aoi Shibuya, Saki Kimishima, Ryo Tominaga, and Shuuji Kayama are teenagers on a historical studies extracurricular activities camp during spring break. On the second day the students follow local siblings Kaito and Miu Shinonome to visit a famous local temple to investigate the legend of the "Beast Gods" (Kemonogami). They are joined by an elderly man referred to only as "Professor" who claims to be studying the legends of the Kemonogami. As they explore, they come across Koromon, then hear screaming. Koromon and the group run to the source and find their classmates being attacked by other Digimon. Koromon digivolves to Agumon and scares the Digimon away. It is at this point that Takuma and the others discover they are in another world.

The students discover that their camp also exists in the other world, but the building is overgrown and run-down; finding a store of food rations in the gymnasium, they choose to use it as their base of operations. Inside the camp, they discover two young siblings, Haru and Miyuki Minase, who behave strangely; Haru acts more mature than his age, and Miyuki appears catatonic. During a battle with a hostile Digimon atop a dam, the Professor seemingly falls to his death, and the Digimon is consumed by dark hands that extend from the fog that covers the area. While searching for Miu, the students are led into a trap by Arukenimon, who poses as a human woman. Ryo experiences a mental breakdown, believing the Kemonogami world to be the afterlife where he can meet his deceased mother. Ryo is consumed by the fog and killed, and his Digimon partner disappears soon after.

The students find Miu living in an abandoned amusement park with child Digimon. She initially dismisses the group's warnings as overprotectiveness, but joins the group when hostile Digimon attack. The students speak to Jijimon, an old Digimon who explains that the fog sacrifices humans to maintain the Kemonogami world. Jijimon provides the group with a key to the waterway underneath the dam, which the students decide to enter in the hopes of gaining more information from the enemy Digimon. Within the waterway, Arukenimon tricks the group with false illusions of their Digimon partners, allowing her to kidnap Miyuki. During this time, Shuuji suffers a nervous breakdown due to the stress of leading the group, which he takes out on his Digimon partner. His abuse causes his partner to Dark Digivolve into the insane Wendigomon, who eats Shuuji alive before attacking the rest of the group.

The group reunites with the Professor, who reveals a Digimon saved him from the fall. In reaction to Shuuji's death the group begins to distrust their Digimon partners, but the Professor explains that Digimon reflect the hearts of their human partner, so there is no danger as long as they maintain a healthy relationship. The group fights Arukenimon once again, and she is killed by the enemy leader, Piedmon, for her failure. The group assaults the enemy base in an attempt to rescue Miyuki, but she is consumed by the fog. Takuma grabs onto her and is consumed as well.

Takuma awakens in a music room with Miyuki, who is now able to speak normally. She explains that she is a miko (translated as "maiden"), and the god who governs the Kemonogami world (referred to as "the Master") wishes to absorb her spiritual power. Miyuki uses her power to open a portal, allowing her and Takuma to escape from the Master. They arrive in the human world, where they discover almost no time has passed. Miyuki reveals that she and her brother entered the Kemonogami world 50 years prior, but she has not aged in that time. After observing a string of industrial accidents and natural disasters on the news, Miyuki concludes that the two world are linked, and if the fog continues to consume the Kemonogami world the human world will also be destroyed. She opens another portal and resolves to return to the Kemonogami world to defeat the Master.

The player can refuse to help Miyuki and stay in the human world, which leads to an early ending where, one year later, Takuma narrates that natural disasters have wracked the world and humanity's future is uncertain. If the player agrees to help Miyuki, the narrative branches depending on the motivation chosen for Takuma. If the motivation "Stay with Agumon" is chosen, Miu is killed and Kaito betrays the group by fusing Dracmon with Piedmon to create Boltboutamon and instructing him to destroy both worlds; if the motivation "Save the world" is chosen, Saki is killed and Aoi suffers a mental breakdown leading to her fusing with Labramon to become Plutomon, an insane tyrant who seeks to absorb everyone into a hive mind. In both cases, Miyuki dies in the final battle, causing the two worlds to fuse as the connection becomes uncontrollable. If the motivation "Save my friends" is chosen, Jijimon is killed, but the group is able to save Miyuki and keep the worlds separate.

On a New Game+, Ryo and Shuuji can be saved, which leads the children to discover the Holy Beasts, the partner Kemonogami of five children who were sacrificed in the Kamakura period. One of the sacrifices was Miyuki's ancestor, Haruchika Minase, who resented becoming a sacrifice and swore vengeance on the world. He fused with his Kemonogami partner, Fanglongmon, to become the Master. His friends fought and defeated him, but refused to finish him off, instead sealing him away until the present day. With the help of the Holy Beasts the children are able to defeat the Master. Haruchika's sister speaks through Miyuki to apologize to him, causing him to repent his actions and relinquish control of the Kemonogami world. The worlds merge, allowing humans to bond with Kemonogami again.

== Development ==
Digimon Survive was first announced in a July 2018 issue of the Japanese magazine V Jump for release on the PlayStation 4 and Nintendo Switch consoles. The western version was announced by Bandai Namco on YouTube through a trailer, with Xbox One and Steam being included in the platforms. On July 6, 2019, the game was delayed to 2020. On July 29, 2020, Toei Animation Europe stated Survive will release in Europe in January 2021; however, this was removed from their website on August 4. The official cinematic opening trailer for Digimon Survive was published on July 22, 2019. On October 8, 2020, game producer Kazumasa Habu stated on Twitter it was delayed again as the game system for Survive was being reviewed and they had to redo their schedule from scratch. On October 15, it was officially announced that the release date of the game was delayed to 2021 due to the COVID-19 pandemic as well as having changed the game's engine during Q2 2020, meaning they needed more time to work on the game. Bandai Namco promised an update on the game's status in Q2 2021. However this update never came, and there was no mention about the development of Digimon Survive during the E3 2021 as well. On July 28, 2021, Toei Animation stated the game would release either in the fiscal Q3 2022 or "beyond". Fiscal year 2022 ended on March 31, 2022 which meant they expected Digimon Survive to release either between October and December 2021 (Fiscal Q3 2022) or some time after that. On October 28, 2021, however, Bandai Namco announced that the game was officially delayed to 2022 and apologized for not providing an update earlier like they'd promised.

At Digimon Con, on February 27, 2022, it was confirmed that the developers had been changed at some point from Witchcraft. The official Digimon Survive website then changed the developers listed on the website to Hyde. On April 18, 2022, the game's Japanese release date was finally revealed as July 28, 2022. Two days later, the localized release date was announced as July 29.

In July 2022, shortly before the release of the game, Habu stated that they had changed the development studio as his original intention was to create the game with a small team on an indie game budget, rather than the budget a Digimon game would usually get, but as the project went on he realized this wasn't possible and had to switch to a bigger studio with a bigger budget to be able to achieve his vision for the game. He also stated he was lucky that the smaller studio (Witchcraft) hadn't used much budget as it allowed him to convince Bandai's stakeholders not to cancel the game. As Witchcraft were using a custom made engine that Hyde could not access, development of the game had to be restarted from scratch which caused the game's development time to double from two years to four years, with development switching from the custom engine to Unity.

Habu also stated that he used his prior work on the Summon Night franchise as inspiration for the game, as well as taking inspiration from the Utawarerumono franchise.

== Reception ==
Reception

Aggregate scores
Aggregator	Score
Metacritic	NS: 77/100; PC: 83/100; PS4: 70/100; XONE: 70/100
OpenCritic	61% recommend

Review scores
Publication	Score
Famitsu	32/40
Game Informer	7.25/10
GameSpot	6/10
Hardcore Gamer	3.5/5
IGN	6/10
Nintendo Life	8/10
Nintendo World Report	8/10
Push Square	7/10
RPGamer	3.0/5

Digimon Survive received "mixed or average" reviews for PlayStation 4 and Xbox One according to review aggregator Metacritic; the Windows and Nintendo Switch versions received "generally favorable" reviews. Trent Cannon of Nintendo Life gave the title 8 stars out of 10 and cited its dark themes and character dynamics as its major strengths, writing, "Digimon Survive is one of the best visual novels to come out so far this year, with plenty of heart and tension to carry you through to the final act." Push Square's Robert Ramsey felt that the character dynamics, intricate artwork, and intriguing story as its highlights but felt that its point-and-click-based exploration sections were "slow, but bearable at best — frustratingly tedious at worst" and felt that its combat was "stunted", writing, "It never branches out from the basics, with digivolution being the only aspect that adds genuine spice to proceedings." Kotaku felt that the game was paced poorly, criticizing its bland character archetypes, inconsistent character dynamics, pedantic decision making, and its heavy emphasis on visual novel-based gameplay, writing, "Playing Digimon Survive felt like reading over the shoulder of someone who's taking too long to turn the page." Reviewers of Japanese Famitsu magazine granted the game a 32 out of 40 total score based on individual reviews of 8, 8, 9, and 7. NookGaming listed Digimon Survive in third place on its Top Visual Novels Of 2022 list.

=== Sales ===
In Japan, Digimon Survive opened below its predecessors' sales with 28,536 retail copies sold for the Nintendo Switch and 7,757 retail copies sold for the PlayStation 4 version, the second and twelfth best-selling retail game, respectively, during its first week of release. In two weeks, the game sold 35,480 copies for the Switch.

In the United States, Digimon Survive had a strong opening as the eighth best seller in 48 hours. In the United Kingdom, the game debuted at tenth on the overall best-selling physical chart. In Australia, the game started 3rd in digital and physical sales for its first week and 7th in New Zealand.

In Spain, the game debuted at fourth with 4,000 copies sold (75% on Nintendo Switch). In Germany, Digimon Survive on PlayStation 4 and Nintendo Switch debuted at third and fourth in the physical sales charts for the respective consoles. In France, the game released exclusively in digital became the eleventh best-selling game on the Nintendo eShop and the fourteenth on Steam during its first week of release.

At its launch, Digimon Survive was the best-selling game globally on Steam, ahead of the videogame Stray; the third in 48 hours and the tenth best-seller during its first week of release, the game leaves the chart the following week. Digimon Survive was 15th on the European Nintendo eShop chart for July.

As of December 2, 2022, the game has sold over 500,000 units worldwide.
