= Yuko Hara (voice actress) =

Japanese voice actress and singer (born 1992)

- 原優子
- Born: June 13, 1992 (age 34); Saitama Prefecture, Japan
- Occupation: Voice actor
- Years active: 2013–present
- Agent: Enkikaku

Yuko Hara (原 優子, Hara Yūko; born June 13, 1992) is a Japanese voice actress and singer from Saitama Prefecture, affiliated with En. She has starred as Mizuki Mashiro in Tribe Cool Crew, Akari Acura in Chaika: The Coffin Princess, and Takumi Mukai in The Idolmaster Cinderella Girls.

== Biography ==
Hara, a native of Saitama Prefecture, was born on June 13, 1992. She was educated at Niijima Gakuen High School, before enrolling at the En Theatre Institute in 2011. She joined En in 2013.

Although she had joined a theatrical troupe to do acting, Hara decided to switch to voice acting after she passed an anime audition. In 2014, she starred as Mizuki Mashiro in Tribe Cool Crew and Akari Acura in Chaika: The Coffin Princess. She also voiced Ami Gidou/Blue Princess in the 2016 anime Six Hearts Princess.

Hara voices Takumi Murai in The Idolmaster Cinderella Girls, a sub-franchise in The Idolmaster franchise. She has performed as a singer on several Idolmaster music releases, including the 2015 single "The Idolmaster Cinderella Master: Absolute Nine" (which charted at #8 in the Oricon Singles Chart) and the 2016 single "The Idolmaster Cinderella Girls Starlight Master 05: Junjō Midnight Densetsu" (which charted at #3 in the Oricon Singles Chart). In 2021, she voiced JunJun/Sailor Juno in Sailor Moon Eternal and Daisangen in the second season of Umamusume: Pretty Derby.

Hara cites Mitsuko Mori as her idol.

In October 2023, Hara confirmed on Twitter/X that she would be marrying a non-celebrity man "whom [she had] been dating for some time".

== Filmography ==
=== Television animation ===
Year	Title	Role	Note
2014	Mysterious Joker	Ginko Kurosaki	
2014	Kindaichi Case Files R	Akane Akimine	
2014	Tribe Cool Crew	Mizuki Mashiro	
2014	Chaika: The Coffin Princess	Akari Acura	
2015	The Seven Deadly Sins	Griamore (child)	
2015	Sky Wizards Academy	Beach Chevro	
2016	Six Hearts Princess	Ami Gidou/Blue Princess	
2017	The Idolmaster Cinderella Girls Theater	Takumi Mukai	
2019	Beastars	Shiira, Cosmo	
2021	Umamusume: Pretty Derby	Daisangen	

=== Theatrical animation ===
Year	Title	Role	Note
2021	Pretty Guardian Sailor Moon Eternal The Movie	JunJun/Sailor Juno	2-Part film, Season 4 of Sailor Moon Crystal (Dead Moon arc)
2023	Pretty Guardian Sailor Moon Cosmos The Movie	Sailor Juno	2-Part film, Season 5 of Sailor Moon Crystal (Shadow Galactica arc)

=== Video games ===
- The Idolmaster Cinderella Girls (2015) (Takumi Mukai)
- Arknights (2019) (Melantha, Beehunter, Indra)
- Life Is Strange 2 (2020) (Lyra Park)
