= Mako Morino =

Japanese voice actress and singer

- 杜野 まこ
- Born: 24 January 1987 (age 39)
- Occupations: Voice actress; singer; television personality
- Years active: 2009–present
- Employer: Tokyo Actor's Consumer's Cooperative Society
- Notable work: Hanakappa as Ageru-chan; The Idolmaster Cinderella Girls as Yuki Himekawa; WIXOSS as Chiyori

Mako Morino (Japanese: 杜野 まこ, Hepburn: Morino Mako; born 24 January 1987) is a Japanese voice actress, television personality, and singer from Tomiya, Miyagi, affiliated with Tokyo Actor's Consumer's Cooperative Society. After her 2009 debut on Sendai Television's Arakashi Saturday, she moved to Tokyo and worked as a television reporter and voice actress. She is known for voicing Ageru-chan in Hanakappa, Yuki Himekawa in The Idolmaster Cinderella Girls, and Chiyori in WIXOSS.

== Biography ==
Mako Morino, a native of Tomiya, Miyagi, was born on 24 January 1987. Wanting to be a professional volleyball player in elementary school, she played the sport for fourteen years until she was a university student. However, while in junior high school, the libero position was introduced to volleyball, and she was automatically assigned to this position (which does not allow serving) due to her height, so she stopped aiming to become a professional.

While looking for a job in nearby Sendai and Tokyo, she was approached about the entertainment industry, and she joined an agency and in 2009 began appearing on Arakashi Saturday, a Saturday morning variety show on Sendai Television. Shortly after joining the agency, she wanted a "name that sounds like Sendai", and after discussions with her manager, she decided with the stage name Mako Morino, referring to Mori no Miyako, the nickname for Sendai.

In 2010, she left Arakashi Saturday and moved to Tokyo. In 2014, Morino voiced Chiyori in Selector Infected WIXOSS and its sequel Selector Spread WIXOSS. In 2017, she starred in Katato The Animation, the spinoff animated shorts from the Cinderella Nine franchise. In 2023, she joined Tokyo Actor's Consumer's Cooperative Society.

Morino voices Yuki Himekawa in The Idolmaster Cinderella Girls, a sub-franchise in The Idolmaster franchise. Since then, she has performed as a singer on several Idolmaster music releases, including the 2015 single "The Idolmaster Cinderella Master 032: Yuki Himekawa" (which charted at #11 on the Oricon Singles Chart) and the 2016 album The Idolmaster Cinderella Master Passion Jewelries! 003 (which charted at #3 on the Oricon Albums Chart). She reprised her role in the anime adaptation The Idolmaster Cinderella Girls Theater.

She was a regular assistant for Miura Daisuke no Hama-ban and Tsunagaru Seven, and she was a reporter for Smile Gourmet, Yumeguri Tetsudō, News Every, Ī Izu Mitsuketa, and News Harbor. She was also an MC for Television Kanagawa's We Baystars and was Yokohama DeNA BayStars presenter for Happy Monday Baseball. In 2021, she collaborated with Sendai restaurant Kosen to serve a brand of beef tongue called Makotan (まこたん).

== Filmography ==
=== Animated television ===
Year	Series	Role	Ref.
2011	Hanakappa	Ageru-chan	
2014	WIXOSS	Chiyori	
2015	Omakase! Miracle Cat-dan	Mamitas	
2017	The Idolmaster Cinderella Girls Theater	Yuki Himekawa	
2017	Six Hearts Princess	Chu-chan	
2019	Cinderella Nine	Katato Ikusa	
2024	The Stories of Girls Who Couldn't Be Magicians	Club President	
2024	Chained Soldier	Shikoku	

=== Animated film ===
Year	Series	Role	Ref.
2013	Hanakappa the Movie: Hanakase! Pakkān Chō no Kuni no Daibōken	Ageru-chan	
2016	Selector Infected WIXOSS: The Movie	Chiyori	
2022	Kaiketsu Zorori: La La La Star Tanjō	Mōrin, Ōtako Nyūdō	

=== Original net animation ===
Year	Series	Role	Ref.
2017	Katato The Animation	Ageru-chan	

=== Video games ===
Year	Series	Role	Ref.
2014	The Idolmaster Cinderella Girls	Yuki Himekawa	
2016	Rage of Bahamut	Maron	
2017	Magia Record	Natsuki Utsuho	
2018	Dawn of the Breakers	Misono Mikoto	
2019	Lotus Labyrinth	Mononobe no Futo	
2020	Vivid Army	Eri	
2021	Megido 72	Agathion	
2025	Magia Exedra	Natsuki Utsuho	

== Discography ==
Title	Year	Single details	Peak chart positions		Sales
Title	Year	Single details	JPN	JPN Hot	Sales
"The Idolmaster Cinderella Master 032: Yuki Himekawa"	2015	Released: 4 February 2015; Label: Nippon Columbia	11	—	—
"—" denotes releases that did not chart or were not released in that region.
