= List of Tribe Cool Crew episodes =

TV series episode list

Tribe Cool Crew is a 2014 anime television series produced by Sunrise (later by its subsidiary, BN Pictures). The series follows the energetic Haneru and the shy Kanon as they join three others, Kumo, Mizuki, and Yuzuru, to form the street dance troupe Tribe Cool Crew. The series aired on TV Asahi in Japan between September 28, 2014, and October 4, 2015, and was simulcast by Crunchyroll. The series is directed by Masaya Fujimori and written by Atsuhiro Tomioka, with character design by Yoshiaki Yanagida and music production by avex proworks and a-bee. The opening theme is "Heartbeat" performed by Lol. The series is licensed in North America by Sentai Filmworks.

== Episode list ==
No.	Title	Original release date
1	"The Move of Destiny! The Two's Meeting"; Transliteration: "Unmei no Mūbu! Futari no Deai" (Japanese: 運命のムーブ！ 二人の出会い)	September 28, 2014
Haneru Tobitatsu, a dance-loving middle schooler, secretly practices his moves by the mirrored window of an old building, unaware that a girl named Kanon Otosaki is watching from the other side. When Haneru later hears about an online dancer known as Rhythm, he decides to try out his moves at the building again. When the passing time causes the window to become see through, Haneru sees Kanon, who was using the building to shoot videos as Rhythm, dancing alongside him, showing an immediate interest in teaming up with her.
2	"Tribal Soul On Stage!!"; Transliteration: "Toraibaru Souru On Sutēji!" (Japanese: トライバルソウル オン ステージ！！)	October 5, 2014
Kanon is a bit intimidated by Haneru's forwardness and runs off, avoiding coming to the building for a while. Later, when Haneru hears about a dance event at the park, he manages to find Kanon there. Together, they visit a stage performance done by the Tribal Soul dance crew; Kumonosuke "Kumo" Sakagami, Mizuki Mashiro, and Yuzuru Tenpoin. Noticing Haneru's impressive jumping ability, the crew invite Haneru and Kanon on stage to participate in a dance battle.
3	"Challenge! Dance Battle!"; Transliteration: "Chōsen! Dansu Batoru!" (Japanese: 挑戦！ダンスバトル！！)	October 12, 2014
As the dance battle gets underway, Kanon is particularly nervous but is encouraged by Haneru and the others to bring out her moves. Following the battle, Tribal Soul are announced as the winners, revealing the key to dancing isn't merely bringing out flashy moves, but rather being in sync with the music, suggesting to Haneru and Kanon that they enter a Dance Battle Festival in order to challenge them again. Wanting to become one with the music, Haneru and Kanon form a proper team and decide to enter the festival, shortening their ridiculously long team name to Cool Crew.
4	"Special Training! Right Cat!?"; Transliteration: "Tokkun! Migi Nyanko!?" (Japanese: 特訓！右にゃんこ！？)	October 19, 2014
As Cool Crew train to dance in sync to music, Kanon worries that their dancing isn't 'cool' enough for some reason, deciding the first step to improve is to practice isolation (moving only a single part of your body at a time), which Haneru isn't too familiar with. Meanwhile, Yuzuru and Mizuki, having suspected that Kanon and Rhythm are the same person, pay a visit to her usual recording place and observe Haneru and Kanon's practice. The pair soon make themselves known and invite Haneru and Kanon to a tea-party, where they get to know about each other and their origins, before helping them learn isolation in a fun way.
5	"Maximum Moves! The Two's Appeal!?"; Transliteration: "Mūbu Makkusu! Futari no Miryoku!?" (Japanese: ムーブMAX！二人の魅力！？)	October 26, 2014
With work being done in their usual practise spot, Mizuki invites Haneru and Kanon to practise in their spot, but Haneru refuses to practise alongside Kumo, who feels his jumps alone won't grip the audience. Whilst stopping at Haneru's diner, Mizuki suggests that Haneru and Kanon take advantage of their unique appeal, namely their height, to improve their dance. Kanon, who has a complex about her height, receives encouragement from Mizuki, who learned to overcome her complex through dance. Meanwhile, Haneru, who previously had a falling out with his classmate Hiroto after pursuing Jey over basketball, learns from the mysterious Master-T that the key to keeping the audience interested is to combine his moves with Kanon's. With both these in mind, the pair practise a new routine, which they then show off to Mizuki, albeit not completely successfully. As the pair psyche themselves up for the upcoming dance tournament, diner owner Yuki shows Kanon an old photo of Mizuki.
6	"Counterattack! Dance Battle!!"; Transliteration: "Gyakushu! Dansu Batoru!!" (Japanese: 逆襲! ダンスバトル！！)	November 9, 2014
On the day of the Dance Battle, Kanon is nervous that she won't be able to perform well in front of others, but Haneru assures her that even Jey gets nervous before a performance. The first round immediately pits Cool Crew against Tribal Soul, with Tribal Soul dancing first. Invigorated by Haneru's words, Kanon brings out a confidence performance alongside Haneru. Despite still losing against Tribal Soul, who go on to win the tournament, Kanon feels happy that all of her worries disappeared and she could just have fun while performing. Afterwards, Tribal Soul, having seen their growth, proposes to Haneru and Kanon that they join together to form a new team, Tribe Cool Crew.
7	"Tribe Cool Crew Moves Out! Haneru vs. Kumo!?"; Transliteration: "ToraKuru Shidō! Haneru bāsasu Kumo!?" (Japanese: トラクル始動!ハネルVSクモ!?)	November 16, 2014
As Tribe Cool Crew begin joint practise, Haneru decides he wants to learn breakdancing like Kumo, though Kumo makes sure to emphasise the importance of warming up first. After Kumo is visited by some of his underlings, Haneru takes an interest in a rumored Dance Road festival that only chosen dancers are invited to. Haneru's free spirit soon comes at odds with Kumo's concerns for his safety and he threatens to quit. After Kanon manages to calm Haneru down and convince him to return, the group receive an invitation to Dance Road, revealed by Master T to be a series of auditions leading to an opportunity to dance with Jey on his stage.
8	"Dance Road, Here We Come! Who'll Be The Center!?"; Transliteration: "Iza Dansu Rōdo e! Sentā wa Dare!?" (Japanese: いざダンスロードへ!センターは誰!?)	November 23, 2014
While figuring out the choreography for the Dance Road auditions, the team need to decide who will be the center. Haneru desires to be the center himself, but finds himself struggling to keep up with the choreography. Later, Haneru and Kanon meets a boy named Yuji, who words about his motivation to dance fires up some rivalry in Haneru and leads him to become focused on practising. Recognising his efforts, the group decide to put Haneru in the center.
9	"Bewitching Steps! Kanon's School Festival"; Transliteration: "Misete Suteppu! Kanon no Gakuen-sai" (Japanese: 魅せてステップ!カノンの学園祭)	November 30, 2014
After Kanon invites Haneru and the others to her school's culture festival, she becomes anxious when her friend enters her into a dance contest taking place at the festival. Kanon tries to withdraw from the contest, but becomes afraid when her teacher learns about her street dancing and runs away. Luckily, the teacher is more understanding than Kanon feared and asks only that she report her activities from now on. Despite her fears over the contest, Kanon still desires to dance, telling Haneru about how she became interested in hip-hop. On the day of the festival, Kanon takes Haneru's advice and gives a confident performance, impressing the crowd and earning respect from her classmates.
10	"Close Encounters of the Tengu Kind! Yuzuru's Disappeared!"; Transliteration: "Kaiki Tengu Densetsu, Yuzuru ga Kieta!" (Japanese: 怪奇天狗伝説 ユヅルが消えた！)	December 7, 2014
The gang is introduced to Momiji Ogarasu, Yuzuru's alleged fiancée who wants to take him back with her as she is almost of marrying age. Fearing the team may split if Yuzuru got married, the others decide to head to Mt. Tengu, where they meet Momiji's grandfather, Hanazo. While Haneru undergoes 'tengu training' with Hanazo, Momiji brings the others to Yuzuru, who remains quiet over whether he intends to return to the group or not. Later, however, Yuzuru gives the others a meal coupled with a performance by Tribe Cool Crew. Seeing his performance, Momiji understands that Yuzuru is the happiest with his teammates, deciding to wait a bit longer before she can prove herself to be a worthwhile wife.
11	"Let's go! Dance Road!"; Transliteration: "Ikuze! Dansu Rōdo!" (Japanese: 行くぜ！ダンスロード!!)	December 14, 2014
The day of the first Dance Road audition arrives, with the group soon arriving at its secret location. After meeting with Jey's butler, Hewitt, all the participating groups arrive at the main stage, including Yuji's group Explosive Machine Guns, where Jey presents a video message encouraging all the participants. As each of teams dance their all, Tribe Cool Crew give a strong performance before Explosive Machine Guns take the stage.
12	"Life in the Fast Lane! Explosive Machine Guns!"; Transliteration: "Kōsoku! Bakuon Mashīn Ganzu!" (Japanese: 光速！爆音マシンガンズ！！)	December 21, 2014
Explosive Machine Guns gives an impressive performance, earning much applause from the audience. Whilst awaiting the results, Haneru hears that Yuji is aiming to dance with a certain someone. Both Tribe Cool Crew and Explosive Machine Guns make it into the top five, earning their places in the second round. After the event, Haneru is given the responsibility of holding onto a Jey pin through which the details of the second round will be sent. Thinking about Yuji's goals, Haneru and Kanon get everyone together to perform for Mr. Wakui, the owner of the building they originally practised at, to show their appreciation. Afterwards, Jey sends a message through the pins explaining the theme for the second round; fighting.
13	"Touch Them! Christmas Dance!"; Transliteration: "Todoke! Kurisumasu Dansu!" (Japanese: 届け!クリスマスダンス!)	December 28, 2014
The gang become curious when Kumo decides to take Christmas Eve off from practise and decide to tail him to see what he's up to. They follow him to a nursery, where Kumo reveals he is helping to look after the children after the principal injured his back. Learning that the nursery is holding a Christmas party, Haneru and the others to help with the preparations and put on a dance show for the children. As Haneru learns the importance of making everyone smile, everyone pitches in to help the principal put on his Santa act before putting on their performance.
14	"Crash Course! Handspring!"; Transliteration: "Tokkun! Handosupuringu" (Japanese: 特訓！ハンドスプリング)	January 11, 2015
On top of having to come up with a new dance move, Kanon also has to practise for a handspring test coming up. Whilst at her mother's flower exhibition, Kanon meets identical twins Hinata and Manabi Sakurazaka, who have also qualified for Dance Road, and is invited to their mansion. After showing her around, Hinata and Manabi tell Kanon that she has a hidden talent that she has yet to realise. Taking the twins' advice, Kanon starts practising to use her long limbs to perform the handspring, which she soon perfects and incorporates into her dance.
15	"Genesis?! Tribal Soul!"; Transliteration: "Tanjō!? Toraiburu Souru!" (Japanese: 誕生!? トライバルソウル!)	January 18, 2015
While visiting an old dancing ground, Mizuki comes across Akira Mochizuki, a former street dancer and the founding member of Tribal Soul. Mizuki tells the others about how she, an introvert, and Kumo, someone who'd get into fights easily, first met Akira during middle school. As the two spent more time observing Akira's dance, they learnt how to dance from him and grow out of their former selves. One day, however, Akira severely injured his knee during a dance tournament, forcing him to quit dancing. Having heard Mizuki's story, Haneru and the others promise to carry on Akira's soul as he heads off to America to be a choreographer.
16	"Jey El in Japan!"; Transliteration: "Jei Eru Rainichi!" (Japanese: ジェイ・エル来日！)	January 25, 2015
As Jey El's world tour arrives in Japan for a concert in two days time, Mister T and the rest of Jey's office receive word that a sniper is targeting Jey. On the day of the concert, which Haneru, Kanon, and Kumo are attending, the sniper, disguised as an injured man, sneaks into the stadium and gain a guard uniform, allowing him to get into position. When Haneru runs into Mister T, he spots the sniper and throws a shoe at him, allowing Mister T to apprehend him before he can attack. After the concert, which leaves an impact on everyone who saw it, Haneru comes to understand what it means to fight when it comes to dancing.
17	"Fight, Tri-Cool! The Impactful Dance Road!!"; Transliteration: "Tatakae Torakuru! Shōgeki no Dansu Rōdo!!" (Japanese: 戦えトラクル！衝撃のダンスロード!!)	February 8, 2015
Haneru tells his teammates about the failed assassination attempt, sharing his thoughts on what 'fighting' means and using that to form their new routine. The next day, the team arrive at the next round of Dance Road, which Hinata and Manabi are participating in, where all the participants will be competing against robots programmed with Jey's dance moves. Tribe Cool Crew give their performance, ending it by shaking hands with the robots, showing both how to fight and how to end it peacefully. Hinata and Minabi's Team Sakura, on the other hand, go for a more gimmicky routine that brings a lot of laughs to the crowd. Both Tribe Cool Crew and Team Sakura qualify for the third round, which will be based on the theme of "precision" and take place in Nagano.
18	"The Two Fight!? It All Started Over Squid!"; Transliteration: "Futari ga Kenka!? Hajimari wa Ika!" (Japanese: 二人がケンカ!?始まりはイカ！)	February 15, 2015
Haneru and Kanon get into a fight with each other over which of their snacks is better, which somehow leads to Mizuki and Yuzuru picking sides before they can settle it normally. Haneru and Kanon try to apologise to each other, but an interruption by Yuji just leads to the situation becoming worse. As both feel that they want to make up but are too stubborn to apologize themselves, it is eventually their desire to dance together that helps them get over their feud.
19	"It's Complete? Galaxy Walk"; Transliteration: "Dekita? Gyarakushī Wōku" (Japanese: 出来た？ギャラクシーウォーク)	February 22, 2015
While thinking about how to up his game, Haneru unconsciously performs an advanced moonwalk that he dubs the "Galaxy Walk", only to find himself unable to remember how he did it. Later, the gang show up at his family's store to ask his parents to take him along on a trip they were planning, becoming impressed by the way his father makes senbei in the process. As Haneru continues to struggle with remembering his move, they are approached by Wakui, who recounts his disco fever days, managing to do a 'backslide' after so many years due to it being ingrained in his body. After dipping a little into some disco fever himself, Haneru manages to pull off the Galaxy Walk once again while deep in thought, but ends up forgetting how to do it again immediately afterwards.
20	"The Longest Day of Kanon's Life"; Transliteration: "Kanon no Ichiban Nagai Hi" (Japanese: カノンの一番長い日)	March 1, 2015
Kanon is approached by a talent scout who wants to make her an idol for his talent agency due to her talents as Rhythm. This, along with the next Dance Road taking place in another prefecture, puts further pressure on Kanon to tell her parents about her street dancing, particularly as her mother, Suika, does not appear to approve of it. While trying to work up the courage, Suika discovers the scout's businesscard, learning everything Kanon has been doing from him and grounding her. Hearing about the situation, Haneru and the others learn Suika used to be an idol herself before she got married. The gang go over to Kanon's house to talk with Suika, encouraging Kanon to stand up for herself and express her love of dance to her. Regretting ignoring Kanon's feelings out of the struggles she had from society for marrying a politician, Suika gives her approval to let Kanon keep dancing, allowing Kanon to properly discard her Rhythm identity.
21	"Clash! Haneru and Hiroto"; Transliteration: "Gekitotsu! Haneru to Hiroto" (Japanese: 激突!ハネルとヒロト)	March 8, 2015
Haneru tries to get Hiroto interested in dance, but he continues to be stubborn as he believes Haneru will eventually throw it aside like he believes he has with basketball. When Hiroto is confronted by their former classmates, the Yamada 5, who challenge him to a basketball match with their shame on the line, the others convince Haneru to come to his aid. Remembering the basketball moves that Hiroto taught him when they were kids, Haneru manages to bring back the score before the two of them use their special 'rocket dunk' to win the match, reminding Hiroto of how much fun they had together. Accepting Haneru's love of dance, Hiroto gives him some advice to help him pull off the galaxy walk at will.
22	"Close Encounters of the Pickle Mansion Kind!?"; Transliteration: "Kaiki!? Tsuke Butsukan" (Japanese: 怪奇!?漬け物館)	March 15, 2015
With the highway blocked by spilled truckload, Master T leads the group along an alternate route towards the Dance Road venue. When the rain gets too heavy, they take shelter at an inn that specializes in various types of pickle, which Master T can't stand as they cause traumatic flashbacks to some strange pickles his grandmother used to make. After dinner, the group decide to explore the inn's surroundings, which contain many more pickle-related horrors for Master T. Soon weird things start happening, as everyone starts turning into vegetables waiting to be turned into pickles by the inn's landlady. This, in the end, turns out to be a nightmare Master T was having after passing out.
23	"Lui & Moe"; Transliteration: "Rui ando Moe" (Japanese: ルイ&モエ)	March 22, 2015
After arriving in Suwa, where the Dance Road is set to take place, Haneru and Kanon decide to explore the area. There, they are saved from some delinquents by two street dancers named Lui and Moe. After seeing how proud the pair are of their team color, Haneru becomes curious if Tribe Cool Crew should have matching colors as well. After coming across Lui and Moe at their dango shop, Kumo, annoyed with Lui insulting the crew for its lack of team color, challenges Lui and Moe to a dance battle against him and Mizuki. Observing how Kumo and Mizuki are in perfect harmony, Haneru comes to understand that their team is its own unique color, impressing Lui with his galaxy walk.
24	"The Foggy Dance Road Tower"; Transliteration: "Kiri no Dansu Rōdo Tawā" (Japanese: 霧のダンスロードタワー)	March 29, 2015
The group head towards the next Dance Road venue, a large tower hidden amidst the fog, where they come across the Sakuragawa sisters, Lui, and Moe. Along with the Explos1ve Machine Guns, it is revealed that the round will consist with only four teams, who must pass three trials in order to qualify the fourth round. Tribe Cool Crew face the first trial, in which they must mirror Jey's dance moves precisely, managing to pass along with all the other teams. For the second trial, the gang must clear a dance game without making a single mistake, which they also manage to pass, moving onto the third round in which they must face off against Master T.
25	"Master T Dances"; Transliteration: "Odoru Masutā Tī!" (Japanese: 踊るマスターT！)	April 5, 2015
Master T challenges Tribe Cool Crew to perfectly memorize and perform an intricate dance routine after being shown it only once. Despite the complex finger movements involved, the group manage to pull it off naturally and pass the trial, earning their spot in the fourth round. Both Explos1ve Machine Guns and Team Sakura pass the trial as well, but Lui & Moe's team are disqualified for trying to include their own steps, going against the round's theme of precision. As Lui & Moe are later approached by a shadowy figure who wishes to make use of their talents, the Sakuragawa sisters give a post-trial performance which wows the others before everyone parts ways.
26	"Maximum Bloom! Dance Over Flowers!"; Transliteration: "Mūbu Mankai! Hanayori Dansu daze!" (Japanese: ムーブ満開！花よりダンスだぜ！)	April 12, 2015
Yuzuru invites everyone to a flower-viewing party, sending Haneru to pick out a spot. Speaking with Master T, Haneru decides to put on his own stage, soon getting Kanon to join him and attracting attention from the locals. Determined to get one of the locals, the "Cherry Blossom Hermit", to move from his spot by a withered tree, the gang use a move Haneru picked up from a drunken businessman, which helps bloom a flower on the tree and lighten the hermit's spirits.
27	"The Cup and Ball Guy's Vow!"; Transliteration: "Kendama no Chikai!" (Japanese: ケンダマの誓い！)	April 19, 2015
Haneru comes across a young boy named Satoshi, who turns out to be Yuji's younger brother who lives separately from him due to their parents getting divorced years ago. Having run away from his mother, who has since gotten remarried, Satoshi gets upset with Yuji for not fulfilling a promise to let him live with him once he becomes the world's greatest dancer. Not wanting to go home, Satoshi spends the night with Haneru, who is challenged to a dance-off by Yuji. The next day, after the battle takes place, Yuji is declared the winner as Haneru had kept glancing at Satoshi, who has renewed admiration for his older brother.
28	"The Demon Princess and Tribe Chrome Dome"; Transliteration: "Onihime to Toraibu Tsurutsuru" (Japanese: 鬼姫とトライブツルツル)	April 26, 2015
Mizuki has been working herself ragged accepting requests, from working double shifts at a hotel during late nights to instructing an elderly dance team during early mornings, on top of her usual training. Worried about her health, Kanon talks to her, saying that she shouldn't force herself to say "Okay", her catchphrase she gave herself when she started dancing with Kumo, when she doesn't want to. Taking Kanon's advice, Mizuki learns to be pushed around less and becomes a lot happier and healthier because of it.
29	"A Drastic Transformation! Yuzuru's True Form?"; Transliteration: "Kururi to Henshin! Yuzuru Shin no Sugata?" (Japanese: くるりと変身！ユヅル真の姿？)	May 3, 2015
Kanon and her sister Kimika come across Yuzuru at a tea house, where a special "Miracle Diamond" blend is served only once a year. Just then, a pair of robbers named Billy and Johnny take over the tea house, demanding the Miracle Diamond tea so they can sell it. When the cops arrive, the robbers hold Kanon and the other customers hostage, alerting Haneru and the gang to the situation. Just as the robbers obtain the tea and prepare to use Kimika to make their escape, Yuzuru, who had been spending the past hour meditating, uses a mix of his dancing and tengu powers to briefly transform into a slimmer form, allowing him to rescue Kimika, recover the tea, and subdue the robbers. The tea house's master gives Yuzuru the Miracle Diamond tea as thanks and the case is resolved, with Kimika taking a shine to Yuzuru.
30	"LuiMoe Returns!"; Transliteration: "RuiMoe Futatabi!" (Japanese: ルイモエ再び!)	May 10, 2015
Arriving at Green Square, the gang are surprised to find Lui and Moe attracting a large crowd with some new moves they've learned since their defeat at Dance Road. As the duo prepare for a rematch with Kumo and Mizuki the next day, Kanon is called out by the Sakuragawa sisters, who state that the 'Crowd High' dance that Lui and Moe have learned puts a large burden on their bodies, while Master T and his team grow concerned about how this might affect the dance community. The next day, as the dance battle commences, Lui and Moe overwhelm Kumo and Mizuki with their Crowd High dance, setting their sights on the next stage.
31	"Ayumu's Operation Lovey-Dovey!"; Transliteration: "Ayumu no Rabu-Rabu Daisakusen!" (Japanese: アユムのラブラブ大作戦!)	May 17, 2015
Assuming there's something romantic going on between Haneru and Kanon, Ayumu comes up with a "lovey-dovey operation" in the hopes of pushing them together, roping Koji into her cause. The four of them go to an amusement park, where Ayumu schemes all sorts of events to try and push Haneru and Kanon together, with little success. Ayumu tries to arrange an opportunity for Kanon to confess, but she instead uses it to express her gratitude to Haneru for becoming her teammate. Determined to make her plan a success, Ayumu has them go through a haunted house, but when things go awry and she winds up in the house herself, it is Koji that helps her through it. Despite her plan becoming a complete failure, Ayumu starts to develop her own crush.
32	"Momiji Returns! The Fiery Finger Click"; Transliteration: "Momiji Ritānzu! Honō no Yubi Patchin" (Japanese: モミジ・リターンズ！炎の指ぱっちん)	May 24, 2015
Momiji comes to the group wanting to become a dancer, with Haneru given the stressful task of teaching her the basics. As Haneru struggles to keep her under control by day, at night, Momiji investigates Green Square's arena, sensing a dark energy. The next day, as Momiji becomes determined to learn how to snap her fingers for a salute, she takes Haneru's lessons more seriously and manages to jam well with just isolation moves. After seeing Jey's moves, however, she decides she can't match up to him and quits dancing, but not before learning to snap her fingers. Before leaving for the mountains, Momiji explains how she felt an ominous aura.
33	"What in the World Happened to Kanon?"; Transliteration: "Kanon ni Nani ga Okotta ka?" (Japanese: カノンに何が起こったか?)	May 31, 2015
After having a strange dream, Kanon starts to feel like her body is growing more sluggish. While the others notice that Kanon's dancing has improved greatly, Kanon starts to become self-conscious about herself, worrying about keeping in sync with her dancemates. The others explain that because of her increased height and longer limbs, Kanon is capable of performing bigger moves, but is hesitant about embracing her star qualities as she thinks it'll pull the team apart. As Kanon remains uncertain about what path to take, Kumo suggests that they temporarily split the team into Tribal Soul and Cool Crew again.
34	"Tribal Soul vs. Cool Crew"; Transliteration: "Toraiburu Souru tai Kurukuru" (Japanese: トライバルソウル対クールクルー)	June 7, 2015
As Kanon feels downhearted about the team's break up, she is approached by the Sakura sisters, who suggest she think about whether she should remain with her friends or aim for higher heights. Later, Kanon's mother gives her Jey's autobiography, describing the pain he felt when forced to choose between his team and his career. Later, Cool Crew and Tribal Soul face off in a dance battle, which Tribal Soul manage to win after showing off some improved moves. Hearing some thoughts from the audience, Ayumu suggests that the reason Cool Crew lost is because they weren't passionate enough. This leads Kanon to realise she was wrong to hold herself back and that the important thing about dancing to appeal to the audience, deciding to reform Tribe Cool Crew.
35	"The Fateful Decision! Twins or Croquettes!?"; Transliteration: "Unmei no Sentaku! Futago ka Korokke!?" (Japanese: 運命の選択!双子かコロッケ!?)	June 14, 2015
Wanting to step up their game, the Sakura sisters invite Explos1ve Machine Guns to practice with them. However, the latter has trouble matching up to the former's flow. Not wanting to continue their joint practise, Sota decides to abstain from his favorite croquettes until the others give up on the idea. After hearing from Haneru about how he teamed up with Kanon, Sota agrees to give it another shot. Finding the Sakura sisters try to rope Kanon into their group, Yuji gets into an argument with Haneru which leads to a dance battle between the two groups, with Explos1ve Machine Guns incorporating some of the moves they learned from the twins. After Team Sakura put on a dance of their own, they decide to keep training with Explos1ve Machine Guns.
36	"Tri-Cool Wavers!? The Forbidden Movement"; Transliteration: "Yureru ToraKuru!? Kindan no Mūbumento" (Japanese: 揺れるトラクル!?禁断のムーブメント)	June 21, 2015
Jey announces the theme of the next Dance Road stage, "Change". As Tribe Cool Crew think about how to tackle this theme, Kanon learns that several dance groups have picked up on Lui & Moe's Crowd High dance. When Lui and Moe perform Crowd High at Green Square the next day, Momiji confirms that the dance is the source of the ominous aura she has been feeling.
37	"The Terrifying Kumo Mansion!"; Transliteration: "Kyōfu no Kumo Yashiki!" (Japanese: 恐怖のクモ屋敷!)	June 28, 2015
Kumo ends up breaking his little toe, leaving him unable to dance until he recovers. As Kumo helps out his family's business, the gang try to find a way to practise without him with not much success. Hearing that Kumo has been spacing out at work, Haneru and the others pay a visit to his family, who are a lot less scary than their outward appearance. Hearing about the other's worries, Kumo encourages them to turn a crisis into an opportunity and returns to practise to help them work on a four member routine for Dance Road.
38	"The Change Demanded of Us! Overcome Dance Road!"; Transliteration: "Motomerareru Henka! Dansu Rōdo o Norikoero!" (Japanese: 求められる変化！ダンスロードを乗り越えろ！)	July 5, 2015
As the teams assemble for the fourth round of Dance Road, the competitors' fears about the legitimacy of the contest are allieviated when Jey speaks directly to them via hologram. As the contest gets underway, Team Sakura and Explos1ve Machine Guns reveal they have merged to form Blossom Bullets, impressing everyone with their debut performance. Encouraged by Kumo's words, Haneru comes to understand that Tribe Cool Crew's 'change' comes from how much they've evolved since they formed, deciding they should just perform the way they are now. Both Tribe Cool Crew and Blossom Bullets make it through to the next and final round of Dance Road.
39	"Haneru vs. Crowd High"; Transliteration: "Haneru tai Kuraudo Hai" (Japanese: ハネル対クラウド・ハイ)	July 12, 2015
With Crowd High becoming widespread, even to the point that Haneru's school has to ban it after a student gets hurt attempting it, Haneru confronts Lui and Moe, who suggest he try it for himself. After some deliberation speaking with Kumo, Haneru agrees to give Crowd High a try, which comes as a shock to Kanon.
40	"Haneru and Jey"; Transliteration: "Haneru to Jei" (Japanese: ハネルとジェイ)	July 26, 2015
After practising the Crowd High dance from Lui and Moe, Haneru starts to take a liking to it, prompting an objection from Kanon, who believes Crowd High makes people forget why they want to dance. Just then, Jey contacts Haneru and the others, telling them of the final theme, "Spirit", with Dance Road's final to take place on his personal island, Bright Island. The next day, Haneru decides to tell Lui and Moe that he won't adopt Crowd High, as he wants to one day dance alongside Jey.
41	"Shiny Cool Crew"; Transliteration: "Kirakira Kurukuru" (Japanese: キラキラクルクル)	August 2, 2015
Following Kumo's recovery, the gang head to the beach for a training camp. There, Kumo comes across a mysterious girl named Hotaru who once witnessed Jey dancing on the very same beach, making the ocean shine. Upon checking into their hotel, Kumo learns that Hotaru was the owner's daughter who had been gone for ten years ago. Wanting to fulfil his promise to Hotaru, Kumo asks the gang to help make the ocean shine with their moves. Together, the gang performs moves similar to Jey and make the ocean light up, which is later revealed to be caused by water fireflies reacting to their dance. The next day, Kumo is surprised to see Hotaru alive and well as a married woman, leaving Kumo to wonder who the girl he met really was.
42	"Happy! Operation Shopping!?"; Transliteration: "Happii! Okaimono Daisakusen!?" (Japanese: ハッピー！お買い物大作戦！？)	August 9, 2015
The Sakura sisters decide to join Kanon and Ayumu on their outing to the shopping mall, where they start buying everything they set their eyes on. Meanwhile, Kumo is secretly working at the mall as a hero show villain, who is forced to try and hide his identity when he discovers Kanon and the others nearby. The Sakura sisters soon decide to enter into a talent contest, which they decide to turn into a dance battle against Kanon. With Ayumu too afraid to perform alongside her and Haneru running late with his own work, Kumo appears in costume to act as Kanon's dance partner. Team Sakura wins with a close vote, but decide to give the prize to Kanon as a present for her mother's birthday.
43	"Everyone Finished? Free Research"; Transliteration: "Minna Owatta? Jiyu Kenkyū" (Japanese: みんな終わった？自由研究)	August 16, 2015
Having not touched his summer homework, Haneru joins Koji and Hiroto on their free research project, which they decide to do on the topic of dance. After trying to come up with a theme to focus on, they eventually decide to research the dance movements of awesome dancers, asking various dancers for their input. Feeling Hiroto's theoretical approach may be too technical for some people, Haneru teaches Hiroto and Koji to dance in order to aid their presentation, with Yuzuru providing his own image training.
44	"Haneru and Dad's Stormy Summer Festival"; Transliteration: "Haneru to Tō-chan Haran no Natsumatsuri" (Japanese: ハネルと父ちゃん 波乱の夏祭り)	August 23, 2015
Haneru and his father Tetsuo argue with each other after Haneru refuses to take part in the family's traditional drumming for the annual summer festival. As both parties remain stubborn, losing focus as a result, Haneru, upon reflection, decides to put on a special Bon Odori for the festival, with Tetsuo as drummer.
45	"We're Finally Here! Jey's Island"; Transliteration: "Tsuini Kita! Jei no Shima" (Japanese: ついに来た！ジェイの島)	August 30, 2015
As Tribe Cool Crew and Blossom Bullets all set off to Jey's private island for the final round of Dance Road, Yuzuru brings along Momiji, who has been investigating the disappearance of Crowd High trendsetters. Arriving on the island, a man named Nelson gives everyone a tour, telling how Jey had taken care of him and several over children from poverished countries, before assembling with the other finalists. There, the project's lead Mabel reveals Jey to be a Dance Roid robot that replaced the real Jey after he fell into a coma five years ago, which does not settle well with Haneru. Mabel further reveals the purpose of Dance Road is to recruit ghost dancers who will update the Dance Roid with new moves. As everyone is given the night to decide if they wish to proceed, Master T takes Haneru and the others to see the real Jey in his comatose state, further driving their desire to dance. The next day, the Dance Road finals are suddenly crashed by Lui, Moe, and the other Crowd High trendsetters, as Gallagher announces his plan to take over Dance Road.
46	"Decisive Battle! Crowd High"; Transliteration: "Kessen! Kuraudo Hai" (Japanese: 決戦！クラウド・ハイ)	September 6, 2015
Gallagher, believing the Jey El Project is simply self-service, takes Mabel hostage and pressures the Dance Road contestants into a dance battle against the Crowd High trendsetters. Just then, Momiji appears, revealing the secrets behind Crowd High, including the adverse effects on the body and mind, though is forced to flee before she can explain what Gallagher is scheming. As Momiji is approached by Hewitt, the dance battle commences, with many of the teams falling under the power of Crowd High. Kumo and Mizuki step up to face Lui and Moe once again, winning against them after the physical toll on Lui and Moe's bodies finally affects them. However, Gallagher then brings out his top trendsetters, Gold and Silver.
47	"Take a Stand! Blossom Bullets"; Transliteration: "Kekki! Burossamu Barettsu" (Japanese: 決起! ブロッサム・バレッツ)	September 13, 2015
As Haneru and Haneru's friends and family miss having them around, Koji and Ayumu bond over their love of seeing their friends dance. Back at the island, Momiji learns of a secret plan that Gallagher is planning while Lui and Moe think back to their original style of dance. Just as Blossom Bullets step up to battle Gold and Silver, Gallagher brings out some robots to prove the effectiveness of Crowd High without the need for any spirit. Undeterred, Yuji brings out a seemingly unending dance move, managing to win out against the robots. However, before he is due to fight against Gold and Silver, he appears to incur a foot injury.
48	"The Moves of Spirit!"; Transliteration: "Tamashī no Mūbu!" (Japanese: 魂のムーブ!)	September 20, 2015
Despite having a sprained ankle, Yuji remains determined to fight alongside the rest of his team, who managed to bring out their camaraderie through their dance. However, it is still not enough to beat Gold and Silver's Crowd High. Given encouragement from Lui and Moe, who return to their roots, Tribe Cool Crew aim to inherit Jey's "moves of spirit" and step up to face Gold and Silver, striking back with a dance that beats Crowd High. Meanwhile, as Mabel is rescued, recalling the true meaning of Jey's teachings, Momiji comes face to face with a Jey DancerRoid turned rogue.
49	"Jey vs. Tribe Cool Crew"; Transliteration: "Jei tai Toraibu KuruKuru" (Japanese: ジェイ対トライブクルクル)	September 27, 2015
Undeterred by Gold & Silver's defeat, Gallagher unleashes his final trump card, a Jey Dance Roid under his control, to challenge Tribe Cool Crew. Meanwhile, Momiji and Master T reveal Crowd High was something created by Jey's sponsor, Rocket Cider, to manipulate people into buying their product. Undeterred by Gallagher's ideals, Tribe Cool Crew faces off against the Dance Roid in an all-or-nothing dance battle. Having felt the power of everyone's dancing spirit, the real Jey is able to wake from his slumber.
50	"Dance Will Change the World!"; Transliteration: "Sekai ga Kawaru! Dansu de Kawaru!" (Japanese: 世界が変わる！ダンスで変わる！)	October 4, 2015
As everyone celebrates Jey's revival, Gallagher remains defiant and resumes the dance battle between Tribe Cool Crew and the Dance Roid. Encouraged by Tribe Cool Crew's moves, Jey gets up and dances alongside them, with everyone joining together for one final dance which touches everyone, including Gallagher, who helps to clean up after his mess. The next day, Tribe Cool Crew receive the final Dance Road pin before everyone returns home. Some time later, Kumo and Mizuki receive offers to become Jey's dancers while Yuzuru returns to tengu business with Momiji, so Tribe cool Crew gets together for one last dance before splitting into Cool Crew and Tribal Soul again.
