= Nozomi Nishida =

Japanese voice actress and singer

- 西田 望見
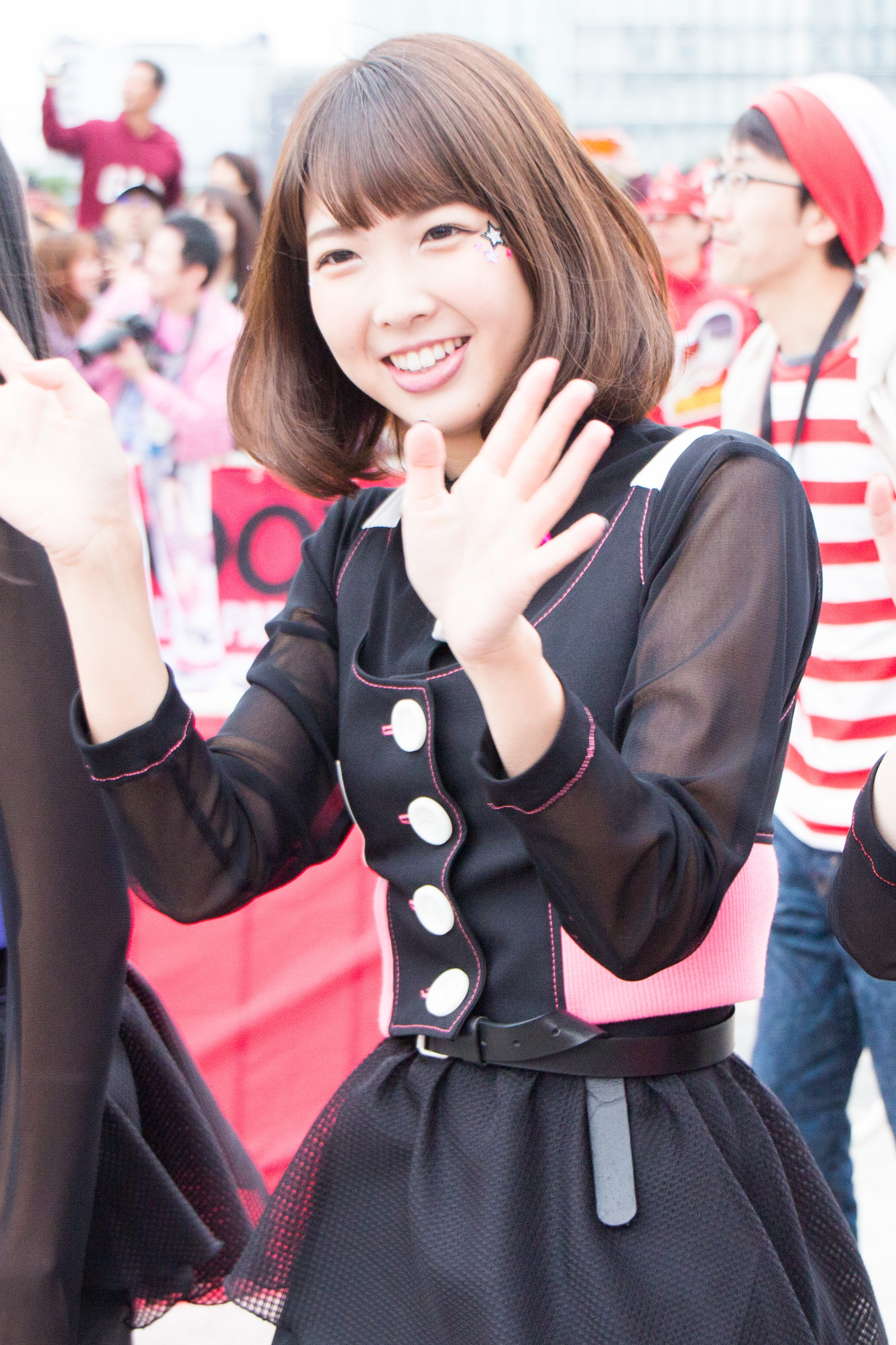
- Nishida at T-SPOOK 2016
- Born: July 22, 1990 (age 36); Gifu Prefecture
- Other names: Nozomi Kayata (茅田 望見, Kayata Nozomi)
- Occupations: Voice actress, singer
- Years active: 2012–present
- Agents: Atomic Monkey (2014–2018); Mausu Promotion (2018–2020)
- Known for: Macross Delta as Makina Nakajima; Armed Girl's Machiavellism as Satori Tamaba; Hachigatsu no Cinderella Nine as Tsubasa Arihara
- Children: 2

Nozomi Nishida (Japanese: 西田 望見, Hepburn: Nishida Nozomi; born July 22, 1990) is a Japanese voice actress and singer from Gifu Prefecture. She began her voice acting career in 2014 and played her first major role in 2016 as the character Makina Nakajima in the anime series Macross Delta. She became part of the music group Walküre, which performs songs for the Macross franchise. She is also known for her roles as Satori Tamaba in Armed Girl's Machiavellism and Tsubasa Arihara in Hachigatsu no Cinderella Nine.

== Biography ==
Nishida's interest in entertainment came at an early age, as she wanted to pursue a field that involved performing. She had also become interested in European children's literature such as Grimms' Fairy Tales and the work of Hans Christian Andersen. Due to her interest, she wanted to study in a country that served as the setting for European stories. She initially considered going to Germany, but due to a lack of available slots instead went to Denmark, where she studied for one year while in high school and learned Danish.

After returning to Japan, Nishida began considering pursuing a career in anime production. She had become a fan of anime and manga, but she mainly focused on characters and was not conscious of voice acting. While in her second year of university, a friend recommended that she watch the anime series Clannad. She was brought to tears by the series' plot and character expressions, which made her decide to pursue voice acting instead. Prior to debuting as a voice actress, she also performed as an idol in Akihabara under the name Nozomi Kayata.

Nishida debuted as a voice actress in 2014, playing the role of a female student in the anime series Invaders of the Rokujouma!?. The following year, she played her first named role, as Sarah in the anime series Absolute Duo. In 2016, she was cast as the character Makina Nakajima, a member of the music group Walküre in the anime series Macross Delta, and also became a part of the music group in real life. In 2017, she was cast as Satori Tamaba in Armed Girl's Machiavellism, and as Tsubasa Arihara, the protagonist of the mixed-media project Hachigatsu no Cinderella Nine. In 2018, she left her agency Atomic Monkey and, after a few months of freelancing, joined Mausu Promotion. In 2020, she reprised the role of Tsubasa for the anime adaptation of Hachigatsu no Cinderella Nine. She made her solo music debut with the release of the mini-album Onna no Ko wa Dejlig (女の子はDejlig) on July 24, 2020. On August 2, 2020, she left Mausu Promotion.

== Filmography ==
=== Anime ===
2014

- Invaders of the Rokujouma!? as Female student

2015

- Absolute Duo as Sarah

2016

- Macross Delta as Makina Nakajima
- To Be Hero as Data Alien

2017

- Armed Girl's Machiavellism as Satori Tamaba
- The Silver Guardian as Farin
- Grimoire of Zero as Magician E, Falling Witch
- Black Clover as Amy

2018

- March Comes in Like a Lion as Receptionist
- Kokkoku: Moment by Moment as Friend's mother
- Doreiku as Rushie Suginami
- Kyōto Teramachi Sanjō no Holmes as Suzuka Ijima

2019

- Hachigatsu no Cinderella Nine as Tsubasa Arihara
- A Certain Scientific Accelerator as Yakumaru
- Re:Stage! Dream Days as Kuroha Shirokita

2020

- A Certain Scientific Railgun T as Yakumaru

2021

- WIXOSS Diva(A)Live as Nana Nekozawa

=== Games ===
2016

- Quiz RPG: The World of Mystic Wiz

2017

- Hachigatsu no Cinderella Nine as Tsubasa Arihara
- Re:Stage! Prism Step as Kuroha Shirokita

2018

- Onsen Musume as Kurumi Tsukioka
- Langrisser Mobile as Zerida

2019

- Arknights as Ambriel
- War of the Visions: Final Fantasy Brave Exvius as Kilphe (JP Version)

2022

- Figure Fantasy
- Langrisser Mobile as Sword of Light and Shadow

== Discography ==
=== Mini album ===
Release date	Title	Package number
July 24, 2020	"Onna no Ko wa Dejlig" (女の子はDejlig)	VTCL-60500 (Normal Edition) VTZL-158 (Limited Edition with DVD)
