= Fūka Haruna =

Japanese actress and voice actress (born 2001)

- 春名 風花
- Born: February 4, 2001 (age 25); Yokohama, Kanagawa Prefecture, Japan
- Occupations: Actress; voice actress
- Years active: 2001–present
- Height: 162 cm (5 ft 4 in)
- Spouse: Yudai Mark Iwasaki (m. 2025)
- Website: www.harunafuka.com

Fūka Haruna (春名 風花, Haruna Fūka; born February 4, 2001) is a Japanese actress and voice actress.

Haruna is most known by her nickname Harukaze-chan. As of October 2012, she had 141,500 followers on Twitter, having been the target of cyberbullying with negative feedback. Due to the online disclosure of her personal information, she had to move houses and change schools.

Haruna entered junior high school on April 5, 2013. She has 160,000 followers on Twitter as of June the same year.

== Personal life ==
On June 14, 2025, Haruna announced her marriage to an American-born Japanese actor, Yudai Mark Iwasaki, who is eighteen years her senior.

== Filmography ==
=== TV dramas ===
- Kaiki Daisakusen: Second File (怪奇大作戦 セカンドファイル, Kaiki Daisakusen: Sekando Fairu) Ep. 2 (NHK BShi, April 9, 2007)
- Manpuku Shōjo Dragonette (満福少女ドラゴネット) Ep. 2, 8, 11 (TVK, 2010)
- Control: Hanzai Shinri Sōsa (CONTROL〜犯罪心理捜査〜) Ep. 3 (Fuji TV, January 25, 2011)
- Netchū Jidai (熱中時代) (NTV, 2011)
- Tokidoki Mayomayo "Birthday no Sora" (時々迷々「バースデーの空」, Tokidoki Mayomayo: Bāsudei no Sora) (NHK, November 2011)
- Akumu-chan (悪夢ちゃん) (NTV, October–December 2012)
- Hao Hao! Kyonshī Girl: Tōkyō Denshidai Senki (Saishū-banashi) (好好!キョンシーガール〜東京電視台戦記〜 最終話, Hao Hao! Kyonshī Gāru: Tōkyō Denshidai Senki (Saishū-banashi)) (TV Tokyo, December 21, 2012)

=== Anime television series ===
- Eureka Seven: AO (MBS, July 5, 2012) as Liu Ing
- Be Ponkikkids "Rongo Max" (BS Fuji, October 2012)
- Omakase! Miracle Cat-dan (NHK Educational TV, March 2015) as Pokomi Akagawa

=== Theatrical anime ===
- Magic Tree House (January 2012)
- Wolf Children (July 2012)
- Complex × Complex (September 2015)

=== Movies ===
- Blood and Bones (血と骨, Chi to Hone) (2004)
- Nada Sōsō (涙そうそう) (September 2006)
- Kamui Gaiden (カムイ外伝) (September 2009)

=== CD dramas ===
- Kuwagata ni Chop Shitara Time Slip Shita (クワガタにチョップしたらタイムスリップした, Kumagata ni Choppu Shitara Taimu Surippu Shita) (January 2013)

=== Dubbing ===
==== Live-action ====
- Along with the Gods: The Last 49 Days, Lee Deok-choon (Kim Hyang-gi)
- Annabelle: Creation, Kate (Tayler Buck)
- The Bodyguard, Cherry Li (Jacqueline Chan)
- The Hunt, Yoga Pants (Emma Roberts)
- Pacific Rim: Uprising, Cadet Renata (Shyrley Rodriguez)
- A Series of Unfortunate Events as Isadora Quagmire (Avi Lake)
- Vanishing Time: A Boy Who Returned, Soo-rin (Shin Eun-soo)

==== Animation ====
- Maya the Bee, Maya
- Maya the Bee: The Honey Games, Maya

== Bibliography ==
- Harukaze-chan no Shippo (はるかぜちゃんのしっぽ（ω）) (Ohta Publishing, August 2011) ISBN 4778312694
