= Sakugan =

Japanese anime television series

- Key visual for the anime

サクガン (Sakugan)
- Genre: Adventure, mecha
- Novel

Sakugan Labyrinth Marker
- Written by: Nekotarō Inui
- Manga
- Written by: Keisuke Sato
- Published by: Square Enix
- Magazine: Manga UP!
- Original run: August 13, 2021 – present
- Anime television series
- Directed by: Jun'ichi Wada
- Written by: Jun'ichi Wada
- Music by: Tatsuya Kato
- Studio: Satelight
- Licensed by: Crunchyroll (streaming); SEA: Bilibili
- Original network: Tokyo MX, MBS, BS11
- Original run: October 7, 2021 – December 23, 2021
- Episodes: 12

Sakugan (サクガン; formerly titled Sacks&Guns!!) is a Japanese anime television series produced by Satelight. It follows Memempu and her father Gagumber as they travel across the unmarked Labyrinth filled with dangerous Kaiju within the Underground in search of a white tower in the middle of a meadow. It is directed and written by Jun'ichi Wada, with character designs by Yūji Iwahara, and music by Tatsuya Kato. An anime television series adaptation produced by Satelight aired from October to December 2021.

It is an adaptation of the novel Sakugan Labyrinth Marker, written by Nekotarō Inui, which was submitted to Project ANIMA, a 2018 collaboration between DeNA, Sotsu, and Nippon Cultural Broadcasting that accepted story submissions from the general public for adaption into anime. Sakugan Labyrinth Marker was the runner-up in the "Science-Fiction/Robot" category.

== Plot ==
The "Labyrinth" is an expansive space deep underground where humans live in clusters known as "colonies." Over the years, the surface has become a distant memory—even perhaps only a fantasy to those who have never experienced it.

Making sure humanity survives the harsh conditions of the underground, a colony's citizens can take on a variety of specialized jobs. These include "Workers," who mine precious ore to fuel the colonies, and "Markers," who journey into the Labyrinth's surprisingly lush environment to bring back information that eases navigation. However, humanity also faces a threat to its existence—creatures called "Kaiju" whose sizes range from that of a small child to an enormous building, and are hostile to any human they see. Moreover, Kaiju that are large enough can force their way into the colonies, further increasing their threat level.

Memenpu is a nine-year-old college graduate whose inventions benefit the Workers in her local colony. Recently, however, she has been dreaming of a place with a never-ending ceiling not bound by bedrock. These aspirations fuel her desire to become a Marker and explore the Labyrinth's vast unknown in search of such a fantastical place. Despite her father Gagumber's vehement disagreement, a certain incident with the Kaiju jumpstarts a dangerous adventure.

== Characters ==
Memempu (メメンプー, Memempū)
Voiced by: Kanon Amane (Japanese); Anne Yatco (English)
Gagumber's nine-year-old daughter. Memempu is incredibly intelligent for her age, having already graduated from college with seven doctorates. She often sees visions of a towering structure somewhere on the surface in her dreams and seeks to become a Marker to find this place despite her father's resistance. As such, the two are often at odds with each other, with Memempu seeing Gagumber as a bumbling deadbeat.
Gagumber (ガガンバー, Gaganbā)
Voiced by: Hiroki Tōchi (Japanese); Christopher Corey Smith (English)
Memempu's single father in his thirties, a former Marker turned ore miner once known as "Gale-Force Gagumber" who actively resists Memempu's desire to become a Marker and find a way to the surface, seeing her as too young to attempt such a dangerous journey despite her intelligence. His wife, Memempu's mother, left them some time ago. He owns the Mark Bot "Big Tony," a mining machine that can shift between a humanoid form and a tank-like vehicle form that he and Memempu use to explore the Labyrinth. His implanted chip possesses an illegal function known as "Gale," which allows him to briefly boost his reaction speed to inhuman levels at the cost of potential nerve damage.
Zackletu (ザクレットゥ, Zakurettu)
Voiced by: Kana Hanazawa (Japanese); Cristina Vee (English)
A notorious thief wanted throughout the Underground who navigates the Labyrinth on a high-speed all-terrain motorcycle. She encounters Gagumber and Memempu in the Italian-themed Jolly-Jolly colony, saving Gagumber's life in exchange for an exorbitant sum of money he later says that he does not have. As a result, Zackletu claims she will follow the father-daughter pair to the ends of the world until she receives her payment with interest. She is the younger sister of Rufus, Gagumber's late former partner.
Yuri (ユーリ, Yūri)
Voiced by: Toshiyuki Toyonaga (Japanese); Adam McArthur (English)
A hacker who leads the Yuri Team, a group of orphans from the colony AreYaar who were deemed worthless by the colony's government. After Gagumber helps to expose a corrupt official, Yuri develops a new respect for him and decides to follow Gagumber and Memempu in order to spread his "justice" throughout the Underground. Yuri pilots a customized Bot, painted red, that is equipped with hacking and electronic warfare devices such as an EMP weapon. His hands are mechanical prosthetics.
Merooro (メローロ, Merōro)
Voiced by: Yoshimasa Hosoya (Japanese); Kaiji Tang (English)
An unflappable agent from the Bureau of Regulation tasked with maintaining law and order in the Underground. He also seeks to preserve old knowledge for future generations and has a passion for subjects such as history and nature.
Lynda (リンダ, Rinda)
Voiced by: Minami Tsuda (Japanese); Erica Mendez (English)
Memempu's friend and "partner," a young Marker who supports and encourages Memempu's dreams and acts much like an older sister. As a Marker, she is officially partnered with her father, Walsh. Tragically, she loses her life when she and her father move out to intercept an attack by a Type 1 Kaiju, but their deaths further inspired Memempu to become a Marker.
Rufus (ルーファス, Rūfasu)
Voiced by: Hikaru Midorikawa
Gagumber's former Marker partner who years ago was killed by an unknown entity after Gagumber abandons him. His death sobers Gagumber's reckless attitude and causes him to retire from being a Marker. Zackletu is his younger sister.
Boss (ボス, Bosu)
Voiced by: Tsuyoshi Koyama
He is the masked leader of a group called Shibito, a terrorist group against the Bureau of Regulation.
Mūro (ムゥロ, Muro)
Voiced by: Misaki Watada (Japanese); Sarah Anne Williams (English)
She is a member of Shibito and skilled at swordsmanship.
DJ K
Voiced by: Hiroshi Kamiya
A famous personality of the popular radio program "Good morning/evening K" that runs in the underworld. The radio is an invaluable source of information about other colonies and news, and there are many hidden fans of the show among the Markers.
Urorop (ウロロッパ, Uroroppu)
A legendary and mysterious Marker recognized as one of the greatest of her kind, having mapped a large portion of the known Underground herself. She sends Memempu a pendant containing a map of the Underground to lead her towards the place in her dreams. She has also been following Gagumber and Memempu's group for unknown reasons.

== Media ==
=== Anime ===
The anime was originally scheduled to premiere in 2020, but was delayed to October 2021. The series aired from October 7 to December 23, 2021, on Tokyo MX, MBS, and BS11.

The opening theme song, "Kо̄kotsu Labyrinth" ("Enchanted Labyrinth"), was performed by Masaaki Endoh, while the ending theme song, "Shine", was performed by MindaRyn. Crunchyroll streamed the series outside of Asia. Bilibili streamed the series in Southeast Asia.

On October 28, 2021, Crunchyroll announced the series will receive an English dub, which premiered on November 18.

==== Episode list ====
No.	Title	Directed by	Written by	Storyboarded by	Original release date
1	"Fathers & Daughters"	Tenpei Mishio	Jun'ichi Wada	Jun'ichi Wada	October 7, 2021 (Note: This episode was pre-screened on August 14, 2021 on d Anime Store.)
In order to prove her worthiness to become a Marker, genius girl Memempu lures her single father Gagumber into a booby trap in the streets of Pinyin, one of many underground colonies in the Labyrinth. Surprisingly, Gagumber catches Memempu with his own booby trap nearby, leading to them calling each other gag names. The next day as Workers at the excavation site, Memempu uses her sensor to help Gagumber mine precious ore used to fuel Pinyin, though Gagumber is still against Memempu becoming a Marker. At night during the annual festival, Memempu and Gagumber hang out with Lynda and her father Walsh, who are both Markers. Memempu later analyzes a gemstone that she received as a package mysteriously sent by Urorop, a legendary Marker. The following morning, Memempu informs Gagumber and Lynda that the gemstone contains a map of the Labyrinth, in which the destination is a white tower depicted on a photo confirmed from Memempu's recurring dream. Memempu, Gagumber, Lynda and Walsh narrowly escape in a piloted mecha called a Marker Bot when rock-like creatures called Kaiju, specifically the Type 1 resembling that of a theropod, suddenly invade Pinyin. While Memempu and Gagumber stay behind from a safe distance, Lynda and Walsh are instantly wiped out in their Marker Bot by a Type 1 Kaiju. Traumatized by what has been witnessed, Gagumber agrees to go on a journey with Memempu in an outdated Marker Bot to the white tower using the gemstone as their guide.
2	"Good Day, Good Bye"	Hitomi Ezoe	Shingo Nagai	Hiroyuki Taiga, Hidekazu Sato, Jun'ichi Wada	October 14, 2021 (Note: This episode was pre-screened on September 19, 2021.)
After Memempu and Gagumber get the Marker Bot up and running, they are momentarily pursued around town by the Type 1 Kaiju, which has cut its own energy cables that would normally cause it to die. Taking an escape route to the other side of town, Memempu and Gagumber come across Walsh's friend to tell her the bad news about Lynda and Walsh. Upon noticing that two Type 1 Kaiju are exclusively targeting them, Memempu and Gagumber enact a counterattack by luring the two Type 1 Kaiju out of Pinyin with help from Walsh's friend. Inside the excavation site, Memempu and Gagumber trap the two Type 1 Kaiju by digging a large pit filled with a flammable ore deposit of nichlosium before dropping a bomb in the pit to destroy the two Type 1 Kaiju. Afterwards, Gagumber recalls that Memempu modified the Marker Bot and named it Big Tony, while Gagumber filed for temporary relinquishment of citizenship at the courthouse before running into Walsh's friend, who registered death certificates for Lynda and Walsh. While paying their respects to Lynda and Walsh, Gagumber gives Memempu a necklace previously worn by Lynda as a memento for the journey ahead.
3	"Brains & Hearts"	Hidekazu Sato	Mariko Mochizuki	Hidekazu Sato	October 21, 2021
Memempu creates a pendant for her gemstone, while Gagumber mines ore that could earn him a week's worth of noodles. As Gagumber mentions that red flags marked on the map of the Labyrinth can indicate established routes, Memempu suggests venturing through a rather dangerous route to arrive at an underground colony called Jolly-Jolly. Locking Gagumber out of the controls, Memempu uses Big Tony to drill a tunnel leading to the Troll's Palm Base Camp as a rest area, using the animus supply lines to recharge Big Tony. As an earthquake briefly occurs, Gagumber tells Memempu to get some rest before they leave soon. Memempu believes that traveling down a chasm will lead them to a cavern near Jolly-Jolly, though Gagumber is against that course of action. Suddenly, a Type 1 Kaiju arrives at the Troll's Palm Base Camp. Gagumber distracts the Type 1 Kaiju, while Memempu goes down the chasm into the cavern. Memempu ends up being chased by a swarm of Type 2 Kaiju, resembling that of a Cambrian crustacean. She locks herself inside a storage unit, but the swarm of Type 2 Kaiju try to break through. Luckily, Gagumber uses Big Tony in order to rescue Memempu before the two outrun the swarm of Type 2 Kaiju and parachute to safety. Memempu and Gagumber arrive at the entrance of Jolly-Jolly, where they are greeted by Merooro, an unflappable agent from the Bureau of Regulation.
4	"Ladies & Gentlemen"	Hiro Ōki	Shingo Nagai	Hiroki Ikeshita, Jun'ichi Wada	October 28, 2021
Since Memempu and Gagumber will be put on trial for violating the rules of the Labyrinth, Merooro temporarily confiscates their personal belongings and grants them permission to go sightseeing in Jolly-Jolly, picturesquely hinting an Italian theme. Memempu and Gagumber get separated during their long tour of Jolly-Jolly. While visiting a bar, Gagumber encounters a mysterious woman named Zackletu, who starts to flirt with him, though Memempu shows up to kill the vibe. Suddenly, three henchmen from the mafia start shooting up the bar, as Memempu and Gagumber learn that Zackletu is wanted by the mafia. Gagumber takes on the three henchmen so Memempu and Zackletu can escape, but he ends up getting captured by a burly fourth henchman. At the mafia hideout, the don interrogates Gagumber about Zackletu, revealed to be a thief with a huge bounty on her head. Before Gagumber gets tortured, Zackletu breaks into the mafia hideout and rescues him. While going on the run, Gagumber and Zackletu are surrounded and attacked by the mafia at a bridge. Luckily, Memempu arrives on Zackletu's motorcycle to rescue them for a quick getaway. Zackletu then departs on her motorcycle, vowing to chase after Gagumber until he financially compensates her for rescuing him. Merooro then arrives to inform Memempu and Gagumber that their involvement at the bar will add to their punishment.
5	"No Work, No Life"	Tomo Ōkubo	Toshizō Nemoto	Tomo Ōkubo, Jun'ichi Wada, Manabu Nakamura	November 4, 2021
Being given penal servitude as their punishment, Memempu and Gagumber are escorted by Merooro to Windy Hill, a paradise full of tall trees, pleasant wind and lush greenery. However, they notice a barren wasteland nearby inhabited by endangered vultures, where the air is stagnant. Merooro then takes Memempu and Gagumber to the site of a broken wind machine that has been suffering an animus leak. Memempu is adamant on repairing the wind machine despite the dangerous conditions. The three of them put on containment suits and venture towards the damaged area. Unfortunately, they are blocked by the shifting structure of the wind machine, and they end up taking a break over playing a round of shogi and drinking tea harvested from the tea tree. After Merooro shows Memempu and Gagumber a photo album of nature from other colonies, Memempu shows Merooro her pendant, in which the light streams on the map represent the animus supply lines that run throughout the Labyrinth. When Memempu is able to locate the source of the animus leak, the three of them go there to repair and reactivate the wind machine. As Memempu, Gagumber and Merooro prepare to leave, a river of animus spills onto Memempu when she tries to protect a nest of baby vultures. Luckily, Memempu is left unharmed due to wearing her containment suit. Merooro contently relieves Memempu and Gagumber of their penal servitude so that they can continue their journey.
6	"Justice for Villains"	Tenpei Mishio	Mariko Mochizuki	Tenpei Mishio	November 11, 2021
Gagumber eventually gambles away the reward that he received from Merooro. Memempu and Gagumber arrive in a beautiful and well-organized colony called AreYaar, where they are confronted by a hacker named Yuri, who leads a gang of orphans called the Yuri Team, composed of Fidelio, Delphi, Lydia, Pokkis and Royby. The university president named Trevi proclaims that AreYaar is the epitome of equality for underprivileged children. Being taken to Team Yuri's base hidden in the sewers, Memempu and Gagumber unexpectedly meet up with Zackletu, who force them to do chores in order to work off their debt. Yuri later tells Memempu that he seeks to enforce justice for previously being discarded along with the other orphans by Trevi. Memempu and Gagumber is roped into assisting the Yuri Team in robbing Trevi's bribe money stashed inside a safe at his study. After celebrating the success of more heists, tension builds when Trevi threatens to abolish the orphanages, leading Fidelio to question Yuri's sense of justice. Yuri still decides to hack into the central server of AreYaar, but he is thwarted by Memempu, Gagumber and Fidelio, in which Gagumber convinces Yuri that he has a flawed sense of justice. Gagumber publicly displays footage of Trevi involved in some shady business, reversing the decision to abolish the orphanages. Since Yuri now has a bounty on his head, he joins Memempu and Gagumber on their journey, while Zackletu will follow them until they pay off their debt with interest.
7	"On the Road"	Hitomi Ezoe	Shingo Nagai	Hidekazu Sato	November 18, 2021
Memempu briefly meets Urorop in her recurring dream at the white tower in the middle of a meadow. Zackletu and Yuri accompany Memempu and Gagumber to a rest area called Route 25, though Memempu begins to experience déjà vu before the four of them continue traveling. Memempu dreams of being silently warned by Urorop about the crazy red face flowers, which seemingly has toxic pollen. At Route 37, Yuri makes sacks of potpourri from the flowers for everyone to wear. Memempu wears a face mask due to having a pollen allergy, but she notices everyone else acting very delusional when they reach Route 49. It is realized that the flowers are an imitation, in which the pollen has a dangerous psychological effect on human behavior. The antidote is from the bitter medicine cactus, which is conveniently nearby. Upon arriving at Route 66, Memempu discovers that the cactus is also an imitation. This augments the symptoms, which may be counteracted with copious amounts of water and plenty of rest. Memempu dreams of foreseeing Gagumber's death. The symptoms subside when everyone wakes up. A heated argument erupts when Memempu wants to hurry to the destination, while Gagumber wants to take a detour to the nearest colony, causing a rift between them at Route 73. Upon arriving at Route 81, Memempu dreams of hearing a baby cry and seeing the gemstone in Urorop's right eye. Memempu wakes up from her sleep to retch from trauma, while Urorop discreetly watches from a distance.
8	"Memories & Regrets"	Yoshito Mikamo	Shingo Nagai	Hidekazu Sato	November 25, 2021
Memempu, Gagumber, Zackletu and Yuri arrive at Calacalla, a rundown colony where Gagumber previously lived at when he went on missions as a Marker with his late former partner Rufus. While recovering at the hospital, Yuri encourages Gagumber to vent his feelings over alcohol. Elsewhere, Zackletu shares a drink with Memempu, who reveals her dream about foreseeing Gagumber's death before starting to fall asleep. Gagumber and Yuri meet up with a Marker shopkeeper already acquainted with Gagumber. It is revealed that Rufus left behind a younger brother. Gagumber is soon contacted by Zackletu, who urges him to confront her or else Memempu might die. A flashback reveals that Gagumber once saved Rufus's younger brother from being an easy target for some bullies. When Gagumber arrives to confront Zackletu, Memempu is tied to and hanging from a rope suspended on a pulley. Zackletu shoots at Gagumber while confirming that she is actually Rufus's younger sister who pretended to be male. Having searched for Gagumber all these years, Zackletu expresses her apparent rage for him abandoning Rufus to die during a mission and deciding to start a family of his own. When Memempu desperately tells Gagumber and Zackletu to stop fighting, the rope tears and Memempu begins to fall. However, Gagumber saves Memempu by reactivating his Gale, an illegal chip modification that instantaneously enhances his reaction speed, though he suffers nerve damage as a result. Afterwards, Memempu still urges Zackletu not to leave her despite what happened.
9	"End of Vacation"	Masahiro Okamura, Hiro Ōki, Kazunobu Shimizu	Toshizō Nemoto	Kagetsu Aizawa	December 2, 2021
Mūro, a swordswoman and member of a terrorist group against the Bureau of Regulation called Shibito, leads an attack at a colony called Manjumai. As they venture through the sweltering heat, Memempu, Gagumber, Zackletu and Yuri decide to cool off at a river. However, a sudden flooding causes a cave-in, washing up the four onto a secluded island. As the four are stranded for a few days, Memempu activates Big Tony as a giant flotation device, but Zackletu points out that Big Tony is out of electricity. Memempu then has an idea for constructing a raft filled with amenities, but Zackletu mentions that the tools are inadequate to use. As Memempu thinks it is safe to just swim to the mainland, Zackletu believes it would dangerous to do so because a Type 3 Kaiju, resembling a sperm whale and eel hybrid, was seen in the water. With food rations running low, Memempu is surprised when Gagumber finds a basket of papayas deep in the forest, giving her the grand idea of using the tropical fruits in the island to generate enough electricity for Big Tony to temporarily send out a distress signal. After Memempu reveals her unsettling dream to Gagumber, he vows to stay by her side despite their differences. Suddenly, Merooro greets the four from a rescue ship commanded by the Bureau of Regulation. Mūro and Boss, the leader of Shibito, destroy the central server of Manjumai, causing a power outage and leaving the colony in ruins.
10	"Oh My Tonny!"	Masato Kitagawa	Mariko Mochizuki	Kagetsu Aizawa	December 9, 2021
After graciously welcoming Memempu, Gagumber, Zackletu and Yuri aboard the rescue ship, Merooro gives them a video presentation about how the duties of the Bureau of Regulation. Merooro explains that a calamity called "the great disaster" is happening due to climate change in the Labyrinth and sightings of Kaiju in the colonies within the last few years. It is further revealed that Shibito steals electricity and throws colonies into states of emergency. The rescue ship also houses a nature reserve for the great disaster. Gagumber feels dejected when Merooro proves to be a better father figure to Memempu. Later on, Memempu retrieves her sheep plushie named Tonny that she left behind at the nature reserve. When the rescue ship suddenly gets attacked by Shibito, Merooro encourages Gagumber to man up and save his daughter, leading Gagumber to contemplate his life as a father to Memempu. As Memempu finds Tonny, she is then kidnapped by Mūro, who desires to kill all "rainbow children". Thanks to the collective effort of Gagumber and Merooro, Memempu manages to break free from Mūro. Before Gagumber has the chance to fight Boss, a Type 1 Kaiji emerges, forcing Mūro and Boss to retreat. Merooro is badly injured while protecting Memempu from getting crushed as the rescue ship submerges to get away from the Type 1 Kaiju. While retreating with Boss, Mūro is shown to have her own gemstone.
11	"Sound of Dream"	Masahiro Okamura, Kazunobu Shimizu, Toshiaki Nagano, Hiroki Ikeshita, Takeshi Nishino, Hiro Ōki	Mariko Mochizuki	Hiroki Ikeshita, Kagetsu Aizawa	December 16, 2021
Memempu, Gagumber, Zackletu, Yuri and Merooro arrive at a colony called Dream, famously known for its opera house. Merooro received intel that Shibito will mount an attack in the opera house just as the diva named Sina will appear in front of the citizens. Outside the theater, Memempu and Gagumber have a chance encounter with Sina, who is trying to evade the security guards from escorting her inside. However, Memempu and Gagumber are wanted as criminals for kidnapping Sina, as reported by radio personality DJ K. Putting on disguises, Memempu, Gagumber and Sina go sightseeing around town before avoiding the security guards again. After visiting a bar, Memempu, Gagumber and Sina hide out at a playground, where Sina explains that her dream was to become an artist, though her family would only allow her to become a diva. Memempu and Sina play video games together, but Memempu becomes disheartened when three children plan to be excavators instead of following their own dreams. Memempu and Sina paint portraits of themselves, while Sina attracts a crowd of bystanders from her singing. Realizing that not all dreams are meant to come true, Sina willingly returns to the opera house on the condition that Memempu and Gagumber will be released. After Sina gives a breathtaking performance, Shibito mounts an attack in the opera house. Mūro calls Memempu a pathetic rainbow child before successfully kidnapping her.
12	"To Be Continued"	Tenpei Mishio, Jun'ichi Wada	Shingo Nagai	Jun'ichi Wada	December 23, 2021
Memempu has a vision of her mother holding a baby and standing next to Ururop in the meadow while Gagumber dies right in front of them. While Dream is forced into a state of emergency, Mūro prepares to kill Memempu, only to be stopped by Boss. Gagumber, Zackletu and Yuri launch a rescue mission while also avoiding the authorities. Boss explains to Memempu that a rainbow child has the ability to retain images in their mind since the time of birth. Moreover, Boss reveals that Gagumber is not Memempu's biological father, while rainbow children are genetically altered with a connection to the animus supply lines. Therefore, it is the sole mission of Shibito to exterminate the rainbow children and restore balance to the world. Gagumber shows up to battle Boss using their respective Marker Bots. Memempu is showed to be immune to the acidic effects of animus due to being a rainbow child. Despite incurring major damage, Gagumber is still able to rescue Memempu, who willingly surrenders to Boss on the condition that Gagumber is left alone. Gagumber admits that he treats Memempu like a daughter even though he is not her biological father, causing Boss to leave them alone. Memempu and Gagumber deploy in Big Tony and head to the central server of Dream, where they intercept Mūro. Memempu briefly sees a wheelchair-using, white-haired girl being escorted inside a secure vault. In the aftermath, Merooro honors Memempu, Gagumber, Zackletu and Yuri for their heroic deeds, though he issues them arrest warrants for the crimes that they committed. The four escape from Dream and continue on their journey.

=== Manga ===
A manga adaptation by Keisuke Sato began serialization in Square Enix's Manga UP! website on August 13, 2021.

== See also ==
- Mebius Dust, the grand prize winner of the "Kids/Game" category of Project Anima
- The Stories of Girls Who Couldn't Be Magicians, the winner of the "Another World/Fantasy" category of Project Anima
