= The Stories of Girls Who Couldn't Be Magicians =

Japanese media franchise

- Anime key visual

魔法使いになれなかった女の子の話 (Mahō Tsukai ni Narenakatta Onna no Ko no Hanashi)
- Genre: Fantasy
- Serial novel
- Written by: Yuzuki Akasaka
- Published by: Everystar
- Original run: March 2018 – September 2019
- Anime television series
- Directed by: Takashi Watanabe (chief); Masato Matsune
- Written by: Hiroko Kanasugi
- Music by: Yoko Shimomura; Hayato Matsuo; Dai Haraguchi
- Studio: J.C.Staff
- Licensed by: Crunchyroll
- Original network: MBS, TBS, CBC, BS-TBS, AT-X
- Original run: October 5, 2024 – December 21, 2024
- Episodes: 12

The Stories of Girls Who Couldn't Be Magicians (魔法使いになれなかった女の子の話, Mahō Tsukai ni Narenakatta Onna no Ko no Hanashi) is a Japanese web novel written by Yuzuki Akasaka. It was serialized on the Everystar website from March 2018 to September 2019. An anime television series adaptation produced by J.C.Staff aired from October to December 2024.

It was submitted to Project ANIMA, a 2018 collaboration between MBS, DeNA, Sotsu, and Bunka Housou (JOQR) that accepted story submissions from the general public for adaption into anime. The Stories of Girls Who Couldn't Be Magicians was the winner in the "Another World/Fantasy" category.

== Plot ==
The Stories of Girls Who Couldn't Be Magicians follows Kurumi Mirai, a young girl who dreams of becoming a magician after a childhood encounter with a mysterious magician, but fails the entrance exam to the prestigious Rettoran Magic Academy and is placed in the standard program instead; despite her setback, she starts to uncover secrets about the school and her own potential magic, with the help of a peculiar teacher who believes everyone can be a magician, even those deemed "magicless".

== Characters ==
Kurumi Mirai (クルミ = ミライ)
Voiced by: Hana Hishikawa
The main character. A girl who dreams of becoming a magician. She applied to Rettoran Academy of Magic, though despite getting first place on the mock exam, she failed the entrance exam and got put into Class 1 of the Standard Program instead of the Magumi.
Yuzu Edel (ユズ = エーデル, Yuzu Ēderu)
Voiced by: Misuzu Yamada
Minami Suzuki (ミナミ = スズキ)
Voiced by: Yui Horie
The teacher of Class 1. A magician who can use magic without a notebook like the ones the Magumi students use.
Maki Kumīru (マキ = クミール)
Voiced by: Ayumi Mano
Kurumi's roommate.
Asuka Kurumaru (アスカ = クルマル)
Voiced by: Yukiya Hayashi
Kyō Kurumaru (キョウ = クルマル)
Voiced by: Chiaki Kobayashi
Northern Harris (ノーザン = ハリス, Nōzan Harisu)
Voiced by: Hikaru Midorikawa
Kai Mirai (カイ = ミライ)
Voiced by: Mikako Komatsu
Club President (マジ研部長, Maji-ken Buchō)
Voiced by: Mako Morino
Club Vice President (マジ研副部長, Maji-ken Fuku-buchō)
Voiced by: Tatsumaru Tachibana
Lemone Juicy (レモーネ = ジューシー, Remōne Jūshī)
Voiced by: Saori Gotō
Mikana Fruity (ミカーナ = フルーティー, Mikāna Furūtī)
Voiced by: Yuka Nukui
Sally Andol (サリィ = アンドル, Sarii Andoru)
Voiced by: Sayumi Suzushiro

== Media ==
=== Anime ===
An anime adaptation of the novel was announced on October 25, 2018, as the winner of the "Another World/Fantasy" category of Project Anima. It is produced by J.C.Staff and directed by Masato Matsune, with Takashi Watanabe serving as chief director, Hiroko Kanasugi writing series scripts, Mai Matsūra designing the characters based on Lily Hoshino's original designs, and Yoko Shimomura composing the music. The series aired from October 5 to December 21, 2024, on the Animeism programming block on MBS, TBS, and BS-TBS, after being delayed from 2021. (Note: MBS and TBS lists the series premiere on October 4, 2024, at 25:53, which is effectively October 5 at 1:53 a.m. JST.) The opening theme song is "Collage" (コラージュ, Korāju), performed by Puffy to Tsuideni Tooboe, while the ending theme song is "Shunkan Saidai Fūsoku" (瞬間最大風速; Instant Maximum Wind Speed), performed by Halca. Crunchyroll streamed the series.

==== Episodes ====
No.	Title	Directed by	Storyboarded by	Original release date
1	"I Want to Be a Magician!"; Transliteration: "Watashi, Mahōtsukai ni Naritai!" (Japanese: 私、魔法使いになりたい！)	Miyuki Ishida	Masato Matsune	October 5, 2024
As a child, Kurumi Mirai met a magician who told her that anybody can become a magician, and gave her a magic notebook. For the next few years, she studied hard to learn magic and eventually applies to Rettoran Academy of Magic, only to fail the entrance exam and get put in the Standard Program Class 1 instead of the Magumi. She falls into a deep depression, believing her dream of becoming a magician is dead. Later, the Magumi students put on a magic demonstration. Kurumi notices they're using magic notebooks just like the one the magician gave her earlier. Suddenly, a monster appears. A magician shows up and defeats the monster, using magic without a notebook. The next day, Standard Program Class 1 meets their teacher, the magician from the previous day. Introducing herself as Minami Suzuki, she declares that she will make them all magicians.
2	"Maybe I Can Be a Magician."; Transliteration: "Watashi, Mahōtsukai ni Nareru, Kamo?" (Japanese: 私、魔法使いになれる、かも？)	Shigeki Awai	Iku Suzuki	October 12, 2024
A new semester begins with Ms. Suzuki's declaration, while Kurumi can't think of anything else but to become a magician. Like the other students, she begins this unorthodox magic lesson, learning a magic spell which doesn't involve using a notebook but rather a circle drawn by hand!
3	"I'm Joining the MRC!"; Transliteration: "Watashi, Ma-ken ni Nyūbu Shimasu!" (Japanese: 私、マ研に入部しまーす！)	Shuji Miyazaki	Kouichi Takada	October 19, 2024
Students begin to join various extracurricular activities. Kurumi wants to join the Magic Research Club, but is turned down since those from Magumi can only join, Later on, she comes upon a similarly-named organization which operates within the school's library. Both current members are investigating the school's mysteries and she is drawn into its activities whether she likes it not.
4	"I'm Gonna Eat Potatoes"; Transliteration: "Watashi, o Imo Tabe masu!" (Japanese: 私、お芋食べまーす！)	Daisuke Kurose	Shizuka Izumi & Kouichi Takada	October 26, 2024
Minami Suzuki continues to teach her class and hints at the gatekeeping of magic, while Kurumi passes her test, and tries to figure out what spell array to use, and she continues on her goal to make students magicians in their own right.
5	"I'll Walk My Butt Off in This Cross-Country Race!"; Transliteration: "Watashi, Kyōhotaikai de Aruki Makuri masu!" (Japanese: 私、強歩大会で歩きまくりまーす！)	Takashi Watanabe	Takashi Watanabe	November 2, 2024
The Standard class wins in their race against the Magumi class, and they are assisted by Kurumi, who remains optimistic, along with other characters. On the other hand, while Yuzu begins to feel more confident about her magic, Kurumi begins to feel less confident in her magic and in herself.
6	"Everyone but Us Went Home for the Holidays."; Transliteration: "Watashitachi Igai, Happī Horidei de Min'na Kaetcha tta" (Japanese: 私達以外、ハッピーホリデイでみんな帰っちゃった)	Shigeki Awai	Kouichi Takada	November 9, 2024
Ms. Suzuki disappears and the cat/school nurse becomes their teacher, while questions are raised as to how students are chosen for the special magic program. Additionally, things at the school begin to grow weirder, while standard class students demonstrate their abilities, even as they are treated as lesser, as compared to other students. On the other hand, Kurumi continues to question whether she should be a magician at all, while Yuzu works to become better friends with her, and raise her self-confidence.
7	"Happy Holidays, Except I'm Feeling Sad!"; Transliteration: "Watashi, Happī Horidei na Noni Higeki desu!" (Japanese: 私、ハッピーホリデイなのに悲劇です！)	Miyuki Ishida	Iku Suzuki	November 16, 2024 (Note: This episode aired at 2:38 a.m. JST, 45 minutes after the original air time.)
Kurumi continues to self-sabotage with her lessening self-confidence, while Yuzu desperately casts the same magic, and wallows in her despair. Her friendship with Yuzu deepens, with Yuzu telling her to call her "Yuzie" and Kurumi gives up spellcasting.
8	"I'll be Having the Complete Sauna Experience!"; Transliteration: "Watashi, Sauna de Totonoccha Ima su！" (Japanese: 私、サウナで整っちゃいまーす！)	Shuji Miyazaki	Toshiki Fukushima	November 23, 2024 (Note: This episode aired at 2:58 a.m. JST, 1 hour and 5 minutes after the original air time.)
Kurumi casts a spell with Yuzu, something which the head Magumi teacher sees, leading him to kidnap Ms. Suzuki and inviting Kurumi to retake the Magumi test. He also invited Yuzu to take the test. All the while, the friendship between Kurumi and Yuzu strengthens, even with some trying to crack down on ancient magic.
9	"I'm Gonna Be a Magician!?"; Transliteration: "Watashi, Mahōtsukai ni Nare Chau!?" (Japanese: 私、魔法使いになれちゃう！？)	Shigeki Awai	Iku Suzuki	November 30, 2024
Kurumi and Yuzu take the first day of the Magumi test, as Mr. Harris continues his slow crackdown on ancient magic. Aniku, however, is removed from Magumi, as he supposedly does not make the cut. All the while, Ms. Suzuki remains rapped in her magic prison.
10	"Our Rettoran is in Danger!"; Transliteration: "Watashitachi no Rettoran ga Kiki desu" (Japanese: 私達のレットランが危機です！)	Daisuke Kurose	Iku Suzuki	December 7, 2024
As Yuzu and Kurumi prepare to take the last day of their test to get into Magumi, they decide to help a student who fell down instead. Mr. Harris is annoyed that they didn't show up, claiming that was their last chance. Later on, other students begin to develop the same sickness. The head of the MRC tells Yuzu, Kurumi, and others that while each of the school's seven wonders are caused by element M, students are falling ill by another process, rather than the element. As they prepare to search for their teacher, Minami Suzuki, and the festival preparations are stopped, Mr. Harris, accompanied by his capybara familiar, prepare to take energy from the students in the school's standard class for a secret project, claiming that the "sacrifice" is worth it. Minami is able to escape her prison-of-sorts and reunites with Yuzu, Kurumi, and other students.
11	"I'm Gonna Cast Ancient Magic!"; Transliteration: "watashi, kodai mahōtsukai tcha imasu!" (Japanese: 私、古代魔法使っちゃいます！)	Miyuki Ishida	Shinpei Nagai	December 14, 2024
12	"I Want to Be More than a Magician."; Transliteration: "Watashi wa, Mahōtsukai Ijō no Mono ni Naritai" (Japanese: 私は、魔法使い以上のものになりたい)	Rei Nakahara	Masato Matsune	December 21, 2024 (Note: This episode aired at 2:03 a.m. JST, 10 minutes after the original air time.)

== See also ==
- Sakugan, the runner-up of the "Science-Fiction/Robot" category of Project Anima
- Mebius Dust, the grand prize winner of the "Kids/Game" category of Project Anima
