= Mebius Dust =

Japanese anime television series

- Key visual
- メビウス・ダスト
- Genre: Science fiction
- Created by: Hajime Shinagawa
- Developed by: Yoriko Tomita
- Directed by: Tarou Iwasaki
- Music by: DÉ DÉ MOUSE
- Country of origin: Japan
- Original language: Japanese
- No. of episodes: 12

Production
- Animator: Doga Kobo
- Production companies: Bandai Namco Filmworks; Asmik Ace; NetEase Games; Hakuhodo DY Music & Pictures; Doga Kobo; Victor Entertainment; Sammy; Nippon Cultural Broadcasting; Dax Production; BS Fuji; West Japan Marketing Communications

Original release
- Network: Tokyo MX, BS Fuji, MBS
- Release: July 9 – September 24, 2026

Mebius Dust (Japanese: メビウス・ダスト, Hepburn: Mebiusu Dasuto) is an original anime television series created by Hajime Shinagawa and produced by Doga Kobo, featuring direction by Tarou Iwasaki, series composition by Yoriko Tomita, and music by Dé Dé Mouse.

It was originally announced in March 2019 under the title Möbius Dust as a submission by Shinagawa to Project ANIMA, a 2018 collaboration between DeNA, Sotsu, and Nippon Cultural Broadcasting that accepted story submissions from the general public for adaptation into anime, where Mebius Dust was the winner and received the grand prize in the "Kids/Game" category.

The series' production stalled from 2022, and eventually aired from July 9 to September 24, 2026, on Tokyo MX and other networks. The opening theme song is "Mebius" (メビウス, Mebiusu), performed by Leo Ieiri, and the ending theme song is "Dilemma" (ジレンマ, Jirenma), performed by Ai Tomioka. Crunchyroll is streaming the series.

== Plot ==
Following a meteorite impact, children who had acquired special abilities known as "Ramus"—triggered by mysterious particles called "Mebius Dust"—were forbidden from leaving the bedtown of Shin-Katsushika, the area where the dust was present. While the children spent their days immersed in games utilizing their Rams, their fates took a new turn when Dr. Yuda, a researcher studying the phenomenon, asked for their cooperation in his work.

The original concept for the award-winning work—while centering on the Mebius Dust resulting from the meteorite disaster—focused on the conflict between a terrorist organization known as the "Bloodshed Alliance" and a comprehensive training academy for anti-RC unit members established by the police.

== Characters ==
=== Polis Hopper ===
Araki Tomori (松明新樹 (トモリアラキ), Tomori Araki)
Voiced by: Yuto Takenaka
Stella Tomori (松明ステラ (トモリステラ), Tomori Sutera)
Voiced by: Nene Hieda
Olga Shiratori (白鳥織花 (シラトリオルガ), Shiratori Oruga)
Voiced by: Haruka Satō
Steve Isora (五空照星 (イソラショウセイ), Isora Shōsei)
Voiced by: Taito Ban
Kai Hikinami (曳波櫂 (ヒキナミカイ), Hikinami Kai)
Voiced by: Aoi Ichikawa
Harry Kagari (篝晴人 (カガリハルト), Kagari Haruto)
Voiced by: Sōhei Horikane

=== February Roars ===
Suzaku Koganesawa (黄金澤朱雀 (コガネサワスザク), Koganesawa Suzaku)
Voiced by: Ayaka Atsuchi
Kayla Natsuzuri (夏釣暁子 (ナツヅリキョウコ), Natsuzuri Kyōko)
Voiced by: Ayaka Fukuhara
Kay Thomson (劔螢 (ツルギケイ), Tsurugi Kei)
Voiced by: Tomohiro Ōno
Anz Karas (唐臼杏子 (カラスアンズ), Karasu Anzu)
Voiced by: Rina Honnizumi
Katsuki Soga (曾我克輝 (ソガカツキ), Soga Katsuki)
Voiced by: Hiroki Nakamura
Marie Shiokumi (塩汲マリア (シオクミマリア), Shiokumi Maria)
Voiced by: Sayaka Senbongi

=== Scarlet Wolves ===
Shippo Marimo (しっぽまりも)
Voiced by: Hiroshi Tsuchida
Tenro Yakata (屋形天狼 (ヤカタテンロウ), Yakata Tenrō)
Voiced by: Ryōhei Shioguchi
Shirayuki Yakata (屋形白雪 (ヤカタシラユキ), Yakata Shirayuki)
Voiced by: Ryō Hirohashi
Takara Tsubakura (津波倉蓮宝 (ツバクラタカラ), Tsubakura Takara)
Voiced by: Yūki Kuwahara
Kirara Mizumiya (三角屋綺羅々 (ミスミヤキララ), Mizumiya Kirara)
Voiced by: Mari Hino
Andy Aokaze (青風敦 (アオカゼアツシ), Aokaze Atsushi)
Voiced by: Hiromichi Tezuka

=== Lamps ===
Taketsune Hori (堀井焚恒 (ホリイタケツネ), Horī Taketsune)
Voiced by: Ayato Morinaga
Mao Amihoshi (網星磨央 (アミホシ マオ), Amihoshi Mao)
Voiced by: Reina Aoyama
George Kakuriki (角力源午 (カクリキゲンゴ), Kakuriki Gengo)
Voiced by: Satoshi Inomata
Renji Kurumasa (車座連次 (クルマザレンジ), Kamado Renji)
Voiced by: Shinnosuke Tokudome
Yuichi Kamado (竈悠一 (カマドユウイチ), Kamado Yūichi)
Voiced by: Ryōhei Shioguchi
Ainojo Kamairi (釜煎藍之丞 (カマイリアイノジョウ), Kamairi Aninojō)
Voiced by: Hiroki Nakamura

=== Diabolic Ghost ===
Kurusu Kotobuki (寿倶留守 (コトブキクルス), Kotobuki Kurusu)
Voiced by: Satsumi Matsuda
Spica Kotobuki (寿真珠 (コトブキスピカ), Supika)
Voiced by: Shiori Mikami
Sora Mella (女良そら (メラソラ), Mera Sora)
Voiced by: Kanon Amane
Xi Haoyū (石昊宇（シーハオユー）)
Voiced by: Kenshō Uesugi
Tay Kanokishi (彼岸太陽 (カノキシタイヨウ), Kanokishi Taiyō)
Voiced by: Shōta Hayama
Kohei Onada (大灘虹平 (オオナダコウヘイ), Onada Kōhei)
Voiced by: Kō Bonkobara

=== Others ===
Shinri Yuda (湯田真理 (ユダ シンリ), Yuda Shinri)
Voiced by: Maki Kawase
Tatsuto Himizu (干水龍門 (ヒミズタツト), Tatsuo Himizu)
Voiced by: Genta Nakamura

== Episodes ==
No.	Title	Directed by	Written by	Storyboarded by	Original release date
1	"First Light"; Transliteration: "Fāsuto Raito" (Japanese: ファースト・ライト)	Tarō Iwasaki	Yoriko Tomita	Tarō Iwasaki	July 9, 2026
2	"Adrenaline Game"; Transliteration: "Adorenarin Gēmu" (Japanese: アドレナリン・ゲーム)	Masashi Tsukino	Yoriko Tomita	Kenji Setō	July 16, 2026
3	"Diabolic Meteor"; Transliteration: "Diaborikku Meteo" (Japanese: ディアボリック・メテオ)	Yukina Hiiro	Yoriko Tomita	Yukina Hiiro	July 23, 2026
4	"Overheat"; Transliteration: "Ōbāhīto" (Japanese: オーバー・ヒート)	Hodaka Kuramoto	Yoriko Tomita	Hodaka Kuramoto	July 30, 2026
5	"Girls' Roar"; Transliteration: "Garuzu Roa" (Japanese: ガールズ・ロアー)	Yūto Nakamura	Yoriko Tomita	Chachamaru & Kenji Setō	August 6, 2026
6	"Shin-Shin-Koiwa"; Transliteration: "Shin Shinkoiwa" (Japanese: シン・シンコイワ)	Takashi Takeuchi & Kotaro Sato	Deko Akao	Kenji Setō	August 13, 2026
7	"Restored Memory"; Transliteration: "Lisutoado Memorī" (Japanese: リストアド・メモリー)	Hodaka Kuramoto	Yoriko Tomita	Makoto Ogihara	August 20, 2026
8	"Deep Divide"; Transliteration: "Dīpu Dibaido" (Japanese: ディープ・ディバイド)	Yukina Hiiro	Yoriko Tomita	Yukina Hiiro	August 27, 2026
9	"Empty Crown"; Transliteration: "Enputi Kuraun" (Japanese: エンプティ・クラウン)	Masashi Tsukino	Seiko Takagi & Yoriko Tomita	Makoto Ogihara	September 3, 2026
10	"Barrier Break"; Transliteration: "Baria Bureiku" (Japanese: バリア・ブレイク)	Yūto Nakamura	Yoriko Tomita	Makoto Ogiwara	September 10, 2026
11	"Mebius Dust"; Transliteration: "Mebiusu Dasuto" (Japanese: メビウス・ダスト)	Hotaka Kuramoto	Yoriko Tomita & Deko Akao	Makoto Ogihara	September 17, 2026
12	"Same Sky"; Transliteration: "Seimu Sukai" (Japanese: セイム・スカイ)	Taro Iwasaki	Yoriko Tomita	Taro Iwasaki	September 24, 2026

== See also ==
- Sakugan, the runner-up of the "Science-Fiction/Robot" category of Project Anima
- The Stories of Girls Who Couldn't Be Magicians, the runner-up of the "Another World/Fantasy" category of Project Anima
