= Omakase! Miracle Cat-dan =

Anime television series

おまかせ！みらくるキャット団 (Omakase! Mirakuru Kyatto-dan)
- Genre: Comedy
- Anime television series
- Directed by: Mitsuo Hashimoto
- Produced by: Kaori Itou; Hitomi Matsuno; Isao Yoshikuni; Naohiko Furuichi; Izumi Furusawa
- Written by: Hideki Sonoda
- Music by: Shinji Miyazaki
- Studio: OLM, Inc. Shogakukan-Shueisha Productions
- Original network: NHK
- Original run: March 31, 2015 – February 23, 2016
- Episodes: 32

Omakase! Miracle Cat-dan (おまかせ！みらくるキャット団, Omakase! Mirakuru Kyatto-dan; "Leave it! To the Miracle Cat Group"), also known as Omakase Mamitasu (おまかせマミタス "Leave it to Mamitas") is a Japanese anime series produced by OLM, Inc. and Shogakukan-Shueisha Productions and aired on NHK in between the variety programs, Tensai Terebi-kun and R no Hōsoku from March 31, 2015, to February 23, 2016. The series is adapted from Neko no Ashiato, an autobiographical essay book by Shoko Nakagawa. The series depicts the slapstick comedy of ten idiosyncratic cats and the members of the unusual Nakagawa family.

== Production ==
The ten cats reflect the ten cats Nakagawa owns in real life, and she adores one in particular, Mamitas, which is also the name of the series' cat protagonist. While the anime is aimed at children, its production committee stated that "the heartfelt story will remind a wide range of generations of something comforting that they may have forgotten in recent times". The series portrays Nakagawa as a child named Pokomi (also known by her nickname "Pokotan"), with Natsuhiko, who watches over her from heaven. Nakagawa stated that "She never dreamed that the day would come when her precious cat Mamitas would be animated." She watched much anime in her childhood, and learned courage and love from them. She also stated that "She hopes that many children, or even just one, will feel something similar through this anime."

The opening theme is "Neko Boogie" (ネコブギー Cat Boogie) by Shokotan♥Haruomi (Haruomi Hosono and Shoko Nakagawa).

== Characters ==
=== Main characters ===
Pokomi Akagawa (赤川 ぽこ美, Akagawa Pokomi) / Pokotan (ポコタン)

Voiced by: Fuka Haruna

A girl who is in the fourth grade.
Mamitas (マミタス, Mamitasu)

Voiced by: Mako Morino

The Akagawa family's pet cat. Whenever he transforms into his miracle cat form, he ends his sentences with no nā (のナー) or nā (ナー).

=== Akagawa family ===
Natsuhiko Akagawa (赤川 夏彦, Akagawa Natsuhiko)

Voiced by: Takehito Koyasu

Pokomi's late pop-star father.
Reiko Akagawa (赤川 礼子, Akagawa Reiko)

Voiced by: Noriko Shitaya

Pokomi's mother.
Etsuko Shirota (白田 悦子, Shirota Etsuko)

Voiced by: Ayumi Tsunematsu

Pokomi's grandmother.
