= Cinderella Nine =

Japanese smartphone game

- Game logo

八月のシンデレラナイン (Hachigatsu no Shinderera Nain)
- Genre: Sports (Baseball, Cricket)
- Video game
- Publisher: Akatsuki
- Genre: Simulation, Social network game
- Platform: iOS, Android
- Released: JP: June 27, 2017
- Manga

Hachi Nai Gaiden: Senryoku Gai! Katato-chan
- Written by: Bkub Okawa
- Published by: Kadokawa Shoten
- Original run: May 2017 – June 2017
- Serial novel

Hachigatsu no Cinderella Nine ～Before Summer～
- Published by: Kadokawa
- Light novel

Hachigatsu no Cinderella Nine Kitakaze ni Yureru Himawari
- Written by: Akatsuki
- Illustrated by: Akatsuki, Chioru Katase
- Published by: Enterbrain
- Imprint: Famitsu Bunko
- Published: April 28, 2018
- Original net animation

Katato the Animation
- Released: May 2017 – June 2017
- Episodes: 4
- Anime television series
- Directed by: Susumu Kudo
- Written by: Jin Tanaka
- Music by: Takahiro Obata
- Studio: TMS Entertainment
- Licensed by: Crunchyroll (streaming); NA: Sentai Filmworks; SEA: Medialink
- Original network: TV Tokyo, TVA, TVO, BS TV Tokyo, AT-X
- Original run: April 7, 2019 – July 7, 2019
- Episodes: 12
- Manga

Hachigatsu no Cinderella Nine S
- Written by: Kōichirō Hoshino
- Published by: Akita Shoten
- Imprint: Shōnen Champion Comics
- Magazine: Weekly Shōnen Champion (August 19, 2021–March 10, 2022); Manga Cross (March 17, 2022–May 17, 2023)
- Original run: August 19, 2021 – May 17, 2023
- Volumes: 5

Cinderella Nine (Japanese: 八月のシンデレラナイン, Hepburn: Hachigatsu no Shinderera Nain; "Cinderella Nine in August") is a Japanese free-to-play mobile video game for iOS and Android published by Akatsuki and Kadokawa. It was released in Japan on June 27, 2017, and ended its service on December 17, 2024. A four-panel comedy spin-off manga series by Bkub Okawa titled Hachi Nai Gaiden: Senryoku Gai! Katato-chan (ハチナイ外伝 戦力外！カタトちゃん) and a novelization titled Hachigatsu no Cinderella Nine ～Before Summer～ (八月のシンデレラナイン ～before summer～) are being serialized on the game's official website. A 4-episode original net animation adaptation of the four-panel manga titled Katato the Animation (カタトTHEアニメーション) was streamed between May and June 2017, and an anime television series adaptation of the original game by TMS Entertainment aired from April 7 to July 7, 2019.

== Plot ==
Tsubasa Arihara, an energetic student passionate about baseball, announces that she is forming a baseball club during the school entrance ceremony. Having been part of her junior high school's baseball team, she was disappointed to learn that her new school did not have one, leading her to start a team to continue her dreams. Despite initial struggles, she is ultimately able to form a team, with many girls joining, each with their own quirks and connections to the sport.

== Characters ==
Tsubasa Arihara (有原 翼, Arihara Tsubasa)
Voiced by: Nozomi Nishida
Tsubasa is a spirited girl who has just enrolled at Satogahama Municipal High School. She founds the girls' baseball team and seeks to make friends and have them join. She is optimistic and hard to get down. In the anime, she primarily plays shortstop. She bats and throws right-handed and wears number 6.
Ryō Shinonome (東雲 龍, Shinonome Ryō)
Voiced by: Reina Kondō
An old rival of Tsubasa's. She aims to go pro and at first rejects the team for being largely inexperienced, claiming that Tsubasa is not taking the game seriously by playing with them instead of players of similar skill. In the anime, she primarily plays third base. She bats and throws right-handed and wears number 5.
Yūki Nozaki (野崎 夕姫, Nozaki Yūki)
Voiced by: Saki Minami
A tall, unsure girl who is at first hesitant to try team sports after turning out to be unsuccessful at basketball and feeling that she let her team down. Yuuki changes her mind and joins the baseball team after seeing how everyone is supportive and refuses to judge one another's failures. In the anime, she is a first baseman and relief pitcher. She bats and throws left-handed and wears number 3.
Tomoe Kawakita (河北 智恵, Kawakita Tomoe)
Voiced by: Honoka Inoue
Tsubasa's best friend, whom she calls Tomocchi. The sensible Tomoe plays the straight man to Tsubasa's less grounded antics. In the anime, she is the team's back-up infielder and first base coach. She bats and throws right-handed and wears number 10.
Akane Ukita (宇喜多 茜, Ukita Akane)
Voiced by: Yumiri Hanamori
A shy girl who wears a cat-eared hooded jacket and speaks in the third person. Akane is untalented at baseball, but quickly improves as she tries her best. In the anime, she is the team's back-up outfielder and third base coach. She bats left-handed and throws right-handed and wears number 11.
Waka Suzuki (鈴木 和香, Suzuki Waka)
Voiced by: Yūbi Midorikawa
A tsundere girl who is talented at observation and baseball strategy, but must be convinced to actually play after being let down in childhood. Her supportive brother is part of a prestigious university baseball team. In the anime, she is the team's catcher. She bats and throws right-handed and wears number 2.
Ayaka Nakano (中野 綾香, Nakano Ayaka)
Voiced by: Yurika Takagi
A budding reporter who insists on writing stories for the school newspaper, despite the school not actually having one. Peppers "nya" into her speech; the official subtitles change this to cat puns. In the anime, she is the team's center fielder. She bats and throws left-handed and wears number 8.
Yoshimi Iwaki (岩城 良美, Iwaki Yoshimi)
Voiced by: Nanami Yamashita
An overdramatic, hot-blooded second-year from the cheerleading squad. She's noted for not being able to turn down a request. In the anime, she primarily plays left-field. She bats left-handed and throws right-handed and wears number 7.
Aoi Asada (阿佐田 あおい, Asada Aoi)
Voiced by: Rika Tachibana
A second-year with little in the way of tact or personal space and a talent for detail. Aoi ends her sentences with the particle "no da" or "nano da." Extremely good at rock, paper, scissors she is initially the team's third baseman, but later moves to second base. She bats and throws right-handed and wears number 4.
Maiko Kurashiki (倉敷 舞子, Kurashiki Maiko)
Voiced by: Yurika Endō (game), Iori Saeki (anime)
A quiet second-year girl and Yūki's classmate in elementary school who excels in various sports like dodgeball. She often has run-ins with the police as she leaves her house at night to separate herself from her estranged parents. In the anime, she becomes the team's starting pitcher. When she is not pitching, she plays first base. She bats and throws right-handed and wears number 1.
Kana Tsukumo (九十九 伽奈, Tsukumo Kana)
Voiced by: Haruka Shiraishi
A member of the student council overseeing the athletic clubs. In the anime, she is the team's starting right-fielder. She bats and throws right-handed and wears number 9.
Maria Hase (初瀬 麻里安, Hase Maria)
Voiced by: Sarara Yashima
A quiet girl who is occasionally seen interacting with Ayaka and watching the rest of the team from afar.
Shiho Nōmi (能見 志保, Nōmi Shiho)
Voiced by: Mewhan
An anime-original character; she is the student council president.
Momoko Kakehashi (掛橋 桃子, Kakehashi Momoko)
Voiced by: Eriko Nakamura
A teacher at Satogahama High School and the team's adviser.

== Media ==
=== Game ===
The mobile game published by Akatsuki and Kadokawa was released for iOS and Android on June 27, 2017. An animated trailer by A-1 Pictures was streamed prior to the game's publication on July 31, 2016. The game is free-to-play.

=== Manga ===
A four-panel comedy spin-off manga series by Bkub Okawa titled Hachi Nai Gaiden: Senryoku Gai! Katato-chan is being serialized on the game's official website alongside the novelization. As of November 5, 2019, seventy-two chapters of the manga have been released so far. Another spin-off manga, titled Hachigatsu no Cinderella Nine S, written and illustrated by Kōichirō Hoshino began serialization in Akita Shoten's Weekly Shōnen Champion on August 19, 2021. In March 2022, the manga was transferred to the Manga Cross website. The series will end with the release of its fifth volume on August 8, 2023.

=== Novel ===
A novelization titled Hachigatsu no Cinderella Nine: Before Summer is also being serialized on the official website alongside the four-panel manga. Twelve chapters of the novel have been released so far.

=== Web animation ===
An original net animation adaptation of the four-panel manga titled Katato the Animation was streamed on the game's official website and YouTube channel between May and June 2017 with four short episodes. Mako Morino voiced the characters in the anime.

=== Anime ===
On July 30, 2018, the official Twitter account of the original game announced that an anime television series adaptation of the game would be produced. The staff and release date for the series were announced on October 25, 2018. The series is directed by Susumu Kudo and animated by TMS Entertainment, with Jin Tanaka writing the scripts and Takayuki Noguchi designing the characters. The cast reprised their roles from the game. It aired from April 7 to July 7, 2019, on TV Tokyo and other channels. The broadcast of episode 8 was delayed for 3 weeks, due to coverage of the 2019 French Open. The game will end service on December 17, 2024, with the game being updated to a limited offline version.

The opening theme is "Etude" (エチュード) performed by Mewhan, while the ending theme is a cover of Noriyuki Makihara's song "Donna Toki mo" (どんなときも), performed by Nozomi Nishida, Reina Kondō, Saki Minami, and Honoka Inoue under their respective character names. Crunchyroll streamed the series. Sentai Filmworks licensed the show in December 2019 for release across various regions including the Americas, Europe, and Oceania.

No.	Title	Original release date
1	"Play Ball!"; Transliteration: "Pureibōru!" (Japanese: プレイボール!)	April 7, 2019
At Satogahama High School, freshman Tsubasa Arihara interrupts the entrance ceremony to promote her newly-formed baseball team, though its small size and obscure status render it an association with fewer funds than a club. She and best friend Tomoe Kawakita invite classmates Yūki Nozaki and Akane Ukita to sign up, but are reluctant due to their lack of confidence. The girls play a pick-up game with other kids, and despite their struggles, Yūki and Akane agree to join the team.
2	"Can or Can't"; Transliteration: "Dekiru, Dekinai" (Japanese: できる、できない)	April 14, 2019
The four try to find a place to play, eventually being introduced to an overgrown and abandoned field. While purchasing baseball equipment, they meet Waka Suzuki, a classmate who was a member of a youth baseball team as a child until she quit after poor performance. She declines their invitation, but her knowledge of baseball tactics and love for the sport while practicing with the club members convince her to join.
3	"Let's Work Up a Good Sweat"; Transliteration: "Kimochi yoku ase o kakō" (Japanese: 気持ちよく汗をかこう)	April 21, 2019
In addition to practicing, the girls pull weeds from the field and attempt to recruit new members; eventually, cheerleader Yoshimi Iwaki, her friend Aoi Asada, and journalist Ayaka Nakano agree to join. At a batting cage, Tsubasa encounters Ryō Shinonome, a former opponent of hers during their junior baseball days. Despite Tsubasa's invitation, Ryō turns her down with the belief that the club does not take the sport seriously.
4	"Though We May Stand At a Crossroads"; Transliteration: "Wakaremichi ni tatte mo" (Japanese: 分かれ道に立っても)	April 28, 2019
At their junior league tournament, Ryō and Tsubasa led their respective teams with different ideologies: while Ryō emphasized success, Tsubasa urged her teammates to enjoy the game. Inspired, Tsubasa's team mounted a comeback to win. In the present, Ryō tries out for a professional team as the club watches on and motivates her. When she does not make the roster, she decides to join the club.
5	"Our First Game!"; Transliteration: "Hajimete no Shiai" (Japanese: はじめての試合！)	May 5, 2019
The team sets its lineup, acquires new uniforms, and organizes a practice game with Seijo High School, led by Jinguji Sayaka. Ryō's pitching and Waka's batting strategies put Satogahama up early, but Seijo's fielders, who were initially playing out of position, revert to their usual roles and lead their team to a 12–1 win. When the Satogahama roster meets up again, the players vent about their errors but remain optimistic.
6	"What We Do From Now On"; Transliteration: "Kore kara no Watakushi-tachi" (Japanese: これからの私たち)	May 12, 2019
Struggling with her skills, Tomoe practices on her own at a shrine until she encounters Jinguji, who agrees to train with her. When Yoshimi and Aoi spot the two, they relay the news to Tsubasa, who confronts Tomoe. Accusing Tsubasa of coddling her, Tomoe ends their friendship. After Tsubasa has a conversation with Jinguji, the two make amends.
7	"The Smiling Lost Child"; Transliteration: "Egao no Maigo" (Japanese: 笑顔の迷子)	May 19, 2019
With the team running low on funds to maintain their equipment, the girls decide to get part-time jobs and request the student council to promote it from association to club status. The council's sports supervisor Kana Tsukumo attends and participates in a practice, while Yūki invites Maiko Kurashiki, a classmate from elementary school, to try out. Maiko's pitching skills impress the team, but her antisocial behavior and incidents with the police due to her situation at home raise concern from the council. When Kana notices how baseball draws Maiko away from her troubles, she convinces her to remain on the team as a permanent member, while Kana decides to play under the guise of continuing her evaluation.
8	"Looking Ahead to Summer"; Transliteration: "Natsu ni mukatte" (Japanese: 夏に向かって)	June 9, 2019
During practice, Akane notices plants budding in the outfield. The club decides to play in a summer tournament, but their adviser Momoko Kakehashi, who also oversees the kendo club, fails to convince faculty to provide additional funding to pay for the trip. In response, the team launches a petition that gains support from the other students. After further discussion, Momoko agrees to relinquish supervision of the kendo club until the tournament's end. When they return to the field, the team learns the plants are sunflowers from a nearby patch, which they decide to water and treat until their outfield is filled with the flower.
9	"Having Each Other's Back, and Having Fun"; Transliteration: "Minna de tsunaide, tanoshinde" (Japanese: みんなでつないで、楽しんで)	June 16, 2019
After hearing Seijo High is hosting a training camp, Satogahama decides to do the same at the shrine, overseen by the baseball-loving head priest. As the camp progresses, the priest offers advice to fix the players' mechanics, though Ryō comments she had never seen him. Upon further research, they notice he is missing in their training videos and come to the belief he is a ghost, scaring them. Unaware of this, Yūki practices her pitching with the priest until he vanishes; it is later revealed he had died in the past, but his daughter comments the summer is his favorite season as a baseball fan. When they return from camp and practice as usual, they spot a girl watching them.
10	"Wings on Your Back"; Transliteration: "Senaka ni tsubasa" (Japanese: 背中に翼)	June 23, 2019
With two weeks until the tournament, the team arranges a scrimmage against Kogetsu High School, who had reached the nationals the previous year and whose pitcher Kosaka Tsubaki was watching their practice. Before the game, Tsubasa creates a new lineup that leaves Tomoe and Akane as base coaches. Taking on Kogetsu's third-string players, Satogahama quickly takes the early lead, though Akane expresses doubt about her role. Convinced by Tsubasa to continue, she offers base-running and fielding strategies that help the team. With her team trailing, Kosaka eventually steps in, but Tsubasa records the final out to clinch the 5–4 win.
11	"The National Tournament Begins"; Transliteration: "Zenkoku Taikai ga Hajimaru" (Japanese: 全国大会がはじまる)	June 30, 2019
To open the tournament, Satogahama is scheduled to play a rematch with Seijo High. On their trip, the two teams encounter each other at their rest stop, during which Tsubasa and Jinguji discuss their differences in the importance of team camaraderie. The next day, Satogahama opens the game on a strong note as Jinguji and her teammates make numerous errors, including allowing walks, that put the former in front.
12	"The Hottest Summer Ever"; Transliteration: "Sekai de ichiban atsui natsu" (Japanese: 世界で一番あつい夏)	July 7, 2019
While conversing with her teammates, Jinguji is urged by her catcher to not carry too much of the team's burden herself and allow her teammates to contribute. Inspired, Seijo begins to mount a comeback while an injury to Aoi and Maiko tiring force Tomoe and Yūki to take over, with the latter as the new pitcher. Yūki struggles to accurately pitch early on, but Satogahama remains competitive as she adjusts. Waka gets the final out to secure the win for Satogahama. The team is later eliminated in the second round of the tournament. However, their success attracts new members to the club.
