= Six Hearts Princess =

Japanese anime television series

シックスハートプリンセス (Shikkusuhātopurinsesu)
- Genre: Magical girl
- Created by: Takashi Murakami

Six Hearts Princess (Japanese: シックスハートプリンセス, Shikkusu Hāto Purinsesu), also known as 6HP, 6♡Princess, and Six♡Princess, is a magical girl anime television series created by Takashi Murakami with character designs by mebae. The first episode aired unfinished on Tokyo MX on December 30, 2016 and aired again in a finished state on September 29, 2017. Six more episodes have aired sporadically over the next two years, with the seventh debuting in September 2019. There were a total of fifteen episodes planned, though the eighth has not debuted as of December 2025, six years later.

The series' motifs are eight values matching the ones central to Nansō Satomi Hakkenden: Jin (benevolence), Gi (justice), Rei (politeness), Chi (wisdom), Chuu (loyalty), Shin (faith), Kou (filial piety), and Tei (respect), the kanji for which are included in the corresponding characters' surnames.

== History ==
Six Hearts Princess was first conceived as an animated short that was exhibited at creator Takashi Murakami's exhibition "MURAKAMI VERSAILLES" at the Palace of Versailles in 2010. The short mimicked an opening theme, ending theme, and next-episode preview for an (at-the-time) nonexistent anime series. Many conceptual differences exist between this early version and later iterations; for one, the early version only included three on-screen princesses: Pink, Yellow, and Blue.

In 2013, Murakami collaborated with cosmetics brand Shu Uemura. This collaboration included a Six Hearts Princess-themed commercial set to the Vocaloid song Pink or Black by kz of Livetune. The commercial marked the first appearance of Black Princess- part of the campaign's theme involved Pink Princess and Black Princess as foils representing, among other things, fantasy versus reality and good versus naughty. At the time of the collaboration, 6HP was described as an 'upcoming animated series'.

From late 2013 to 2015, four cosplay performances- titled 6HP Ki, 6HP Sho, 6HP Ten, and 6HP Yui- were held to promote the series. As of the final performance in 2015, it was reportedly in production. The performances and the visuals created for them contained two characters not seen in any other 6HP media to date- Yukiko Nekozuka and Risako Inukai, the evil 'dark heart princesses'. Also featured was Kyoko Takatomi, White Princess, whose status in the newest iteration is still uncertain.

The pilot episode aired in 2016 as promised; its plot, like those of each of the iterations before it, differed heavily from the final version. Production on the full series started afterwards. When the first episode was released, it was unfinished, and an apology message from Murakami was appended to it along with a documentary segment on the series' production. Following episodes would also be aired alongside documentaries; a documentary appended to a re-airing of the pilot revealed that it was originally supposed to be partially or entirely 2D rather than CGI.

== Plot ==
The isolated town of Hinomori is the last outpost in a destroyed world. It is repeatedly attacked by 'beasts of sin'/Zaiju, and is protected by the legendary Heart Princesses, who are responsible for its continued survival. A young girl named Haruka Hani, is asked to join their ranks by a creature called a Moon Cat. She saves her best friend, Tamaki Teijou, from an attacking Zaiju in the second episode.

As the series continues, references are made to a conflict between two species, the Moon Cats, colorful cats who transform girls into Princesses, and the Earth Wolves, the main antagonists of the series. A group of Earth Wolves in human form attend the same school as the Princesses and are responsible for summoning Zaiju.

Later, Ami Gido, a girl who works at her family's Chinese restaurant, becomes Blue Princess, and Yukari Mure, a glasses-wearing girl, becomes Yellow Princess. Three others are introduced- Megumi Daishin/ Gold Princess, Kanade Chidori/ Purple Princess, and Makoto Yoshitada/ Green Princess.

In episode 6, Tamaki is transformed into Black Princess, but she's turned into a Zaiju in the middle of the process and begins attacking the others.

== Characters ==
=== Heart Princesses ===
The Heart Princesses are girls who are recruited by the Moon Cats in order to protect Hinomori. When a girl gets her Heart princess identity, she receives a peony mark somewhere on her body in her signature color.

Haruka Hani (羽仁 はるか, Hani Haruka) / Pink Princess

Haruka is a cheerful and peppy young girl, and she has her pink hair into pigtails. The virtue she represents is Jin and her peony mark is on her chest. Her parents are almost never home, so she lives alone most of the time. Her best friend as of episode 1 is Tamaki Teijou. She has a strange dream about a cat village towards the beginning of the first episode and is immediately inspired to begin writing a play in the show, as she's in the school Drama Club. Her Moon Cat counterpart is Jin. She's the first main character to become a Princess on screen.

Ami Gidou (義堂 あみ, Gidou Ami) / Blue Princess

Ami is a blue-haired hardworking and loyal young girl who works to support her parents and their restaurant. She becomes a Princess in episode 3, the second character who does that on-screen. Her Moon Cat counterpart and virtue are Gi. Her peony mark is on her back.

Yukari Mure (牟礼 ゆかり, Mure Yukari) / Yellow Princess

Yukari is a softhearted yet serious young girl forced to become a Princess in order to save the others. She wears glasses in her civilian form. Rei is her Moon Cat counterpart/virtue, and her peony mark is on her right thigh.

Megumi Daishin (大信 めぐみ, Daishin Megumi) / Gold Princess

One of the three known high-school aged princesses. Megumi is calm, ladylike, and suspicious of the Moon Cats. Her peony mark is on her right eye, and her Moon Cat counterpart is Shin. The virtue she represents is Shin.

Kanade Chidori (智鳥 かなで, Chidori Kanade) / Purple Princess

Kanade is a tomboy, and one of the high school Princesses along with Megumi and Makoto. She's the only Princess who wears a boys' school uniform, as well as the only one with a dark skin-tone. Her personal Moon Cat is Chi, as is her virtue. Her peony mark is on her forehead.

Makoto Yoshitada (吉忠 まこと, Yoshitada Makoto) / Green Princess

Makoto is one of the three high-school princesses. She is an energetic girl who speaks in a Kansai dialect and loves puns. Her peony mark is formed by both of her forearms, her corresponding virtue (and corresponding moon cat) is Chuu.

=== Antagonists ===
Fusanosuke Hoegami (吠上 房之助, Hoegami Fusanosuke)

Fusanosuke is an Earth Wolf boy who's known Tamaki since she first came into town. He's hostile towards the Heart Princesses, but friends with Tamaki nonetheless. He appears to be the leader of the Earth Wolf group at Hinomori Academy Middle School.

Shijou Kagiriko (嗅霧湖 四条, Kagiriko Shijou)

An androgynous boy who wears his hair in a bob. He attends Hinomori Academy Middle School along with the Princesses and other Earth Wolves.

Rokkaku Tsumadaru (爪陀琉 六角, Tsumadaru Rokkaku)

A blue-hair, glasses-wearing Earth Wolf who functions as the brains of the group. He has a nerdy personality and a crush on Blue Princess, despite the fact that they're enemies.

Wan Gasaragi (牙更城 王, Gasaragi Wan)

An Earth Wolf who frequently provokes the Heart Princesses. He appears to be older than the other three, and has an aloof personality.

Tamaki Teijou (悌上 たまき, Teijou Tamaki) / Black Princess

Haruka's shy and gentle best friend. Tamaki has black hair in a bob. She evacuated to Hinomori city as a young orphan, and met Fusanosuke, an Earth Wolf, in the process. Her peony mark is on her lower abdomen. The virtue she represents (and the name of her Moon Cat counterpart) is Tei. She's in the same drama club as Haruka. However, while receiving her mark, she was turned evil. Out of the currently introduced main characters, Tamaki is the last to become a Princess.

== Episode list ==
No.	Title	Screenplay by	Storyboarded by	Directed by	Animation director	Airdate
Pilot episode	-	Takashi Yamashita	mebae	-	-	December 30, 2016
01	And Yet, The True Name of Heaven and Earth (Japanese: 然れども天地の御真名, Shikaredomo tenchi no o mana)	Daichi Nakagawa	Hiroyuki Shimazu	Shigeru Ueda	Masaki Saito, Teruhiko Yamazaki, Megumi Yoshimura, Shigenori Awai, Mai Sakamoto, Kyoko Niimura	September 29, 2017
02	Equinox (Japanese: 日の光の力等しき一日。, Ni~Tsu no hikari no chikara hitoshiki tsuitachi. Lit. A day as powerful as sunlight)	Daichi Nakagawa, Daimasa Nakazono, Shinzo Katayama, Takashi Murakami	Hiroyuki Shimazu, mebae	Kenichi Takeshita	Aya Tanaka, Inoue Jet, Kazuhiro Fukuchi	December 23, 2017
03	Resound, the Song of Righteousness! Blue Peony of Passion (Japanese: 響け「義」の歌！情熱の青牡丹, Hibike `gi' no uta! Jōnetsu no aobotan)	Daichi Nakagawa, Daimasa Nakazono, Shinzo Katayama, Takashi Murakami	Hiroyuki Shimazu, Nanako Shimazaki, mebae	Yasuo Ejima	Kazuhiro Fukuchi	June 17, 2018
04	Mysterious Transfer Teacher (Japanese: 謎の転校先生, Nazo no tenkō sensei)	Daichi Nakagawa, Daimasa Nakazono, Shinzo Katayama, Takashi Murakami	Hiroyuki Shimazu, Nanako Shimazaki, Yuta Takamura	Yuta Takamura	Kiyotaka Iida, Kazuyuki Iikai, Kohei Ashiya	September 22, 2018
05	The Boundary of the End of the World (Japanese: この世の果ての境界線, Konoyonohate no kyōkai-sen)	Daichi Nakagawa, Shinzo Katayama, Takashi Murakami	Hiroyuki Shimazu, Nanako Shimazaki, Kenichi Takeshita, Keitarou Motonaga	Kenichi Takeshita, Keitarou Motonaga	Hiroshi Matsumoto, Go Yabuki	March 31, 2019
06	What Do You Believe In? (Japanese: 信じるものは何ですか？, Shinjiru mono wa nanidesu ka?)	Daichi Nakagawa, Shinzo Katayama, Takashi Murakami	Nanako Shimazaki, Hiroyuki Shimazu	Nanako Shimizaki	Atsuko Takahashi	May 26, 2019
07	The Land of Never Forgotten (Japanese: 勿忘郷, Wasurena-no-Sato)	Daichi Nakagawa, Shinzo Katayama, Udatan, Takashi Murakami	Yuta Takamura, Hiroyuki Shimazu, Nanako Shimazaki	Yuta Takamura	Kenji Terao, Kiyotaka Iida, Kohei Ashiya, Kazuhiro Fukuchi	September 21, 2019
