= Tribe Cool Crew =

Japanese anime television series

- Promotional image featuring (from top) Haneru, Kanon, Mizuki, Kumo, and Yuzuru.

トライブクルクル (Toraibu KuruKuru)
- Genre: Comedy, Dance, Music
- Created by: Hajime Yatate
- Anime television series
- Directed by: Masaya Fujimori
- Produced by: Chieko Kusunoki (Nagoya TV); Akiko Hirayama (Asatsu-DK); Isao Minegishi (Sunrise→BN Pictures)
- Written by: Atsuhiro Tomioka; Miya Asakawa; Nobuaki Yamaguchi; Kouji Miura; Yuko Ishiyama; Makoto Koyama
- Music by: avex proworks (Dance Side); A-bee (Drama Side)
- Studio: Sunrise (#1–24); BN Pictures (#25–50)
- Licensed by: NA: Sentai Filmworks
- Original network: ANN (Nagoya TV, TV Asahi)
- English network: NA: Anime Network
- Original run: September 28, 2014 – October 4, 2015
- Episodes: 50
- Video game

Tribe Cool Crew: The G@me
- Developer: NanaOn-Sha
- Publisher: Bandai Namco Entertainment
- Genre: Rhythm
- Platform: Nintendo 3DS
- Released: May 28, 2015

Tribe Cool Crew (トライブクルクル, Toraibu KuruKuru) is a 2014 Japanese anime series produced by Sunrise, and later by its subsidiary, BN Pictures. The series, directed by Masaya Fujimori, aired on TV Asahi between September 28, 2014, and October 4, 2015. The series is licensed in North America by Sentai Filmworks.

== Plot ==
One day, Haneru Tobitatsu, a middle school student who loves to dance, meets Kanon Otosaki, a girl who is also skilled at dancing, but is shy about doing it in public. As the two get to know each other, they team up with three other dancers; Kumo, Mizuki, and Yuzuru, to form the dance group Tribe Cool Crew.

== Characters ==
=== Tribe Cool Crew ===
Cool Crew

Haneru Tobitatsu (飛竜 ハネル, Tobitatsu Haneru)
Voiced by: Shizuka Ishigami
An energetic young boy who makes up for his short stature with incredible jumping ability. He has a strong love for dancing, wanting to be just like his idol, Jay-El. He initially forms the Cool Crew unit with Kanon before merging with Tribal Soul to become Tribe Cool Crew.
Kanon Otosaki (音咲 カノン, Otosaki Kanon)
Voiced by: Yuri Yamaoka
A very shy girl who attends a private girls' academy. Prior to meeting Haneru, she posts anonymous dance videos online under the persona of "Rhythm", but soon starts to break out of her shell after meeting Haneru.

Tribal Soul (トライバルソウル, Toraibaru Souru)

Kumonosuke "Kumo" Sakagami (坂上 雲之介, Sakagami Kumonosuke)
Voiced by: Toru Sakurai
The leader of the Tribal Soul dance crew alongside Mizuki and Yuzuru, who specializes in breakdancing. Despite his fearsome appearance, he is quite kind. He tends to call out to and challenge those who interest him.
Mizuki Mashiro (真城 ミズキ, Mashiro Mizuki)
Voiced by: Yuko Hara
Tribal Soul's second member, a kind-hearted woman who specializes in jazz and has a love of sweets as well as a relaxed personality.
Yuzuru Tempoin (天宝院 ユヅル, Tenpoin Yuzuru)
Voiced by: Sōma Saitō
A slightly portly but very gentlemanly member of Tribal Soul, who often serves as the MC for the group. He is described as a "dance machine", skilled in all kinds of dance.

=== Blossom Bullets ===
Explos1ve Machine Guns (爆音マシンガンズ, Bakuon Mashin Ganzu)

Yuji Shishido (獅子堂 ユージ, Shishidō Yūji)
Voiced by: Chika Anzai
Sota Noguchi (野口 ソータ, Noguchi Sōta)
Voiced by: Nana Nītsu
Riki Sakota (迫田 リキ, Sakota Riki)
Voiced by: Kōhei Aoyama

Team Sakura (TEAM 桜)

Hinata Sakuragawa (桜坂 ヒナタ, Sakuragawa Hinata)
Voiced by: Mii Miki
Manabi Sakuragawa (桜坂 マナビ, Sakuragawa Manabi)
Voiced by: Hibiki Yamamura

=== Other dance groups ===
With the Grandiose Yatsugatake Range to the East, the Lake Suwa's Waters Shine Clear, and On its Shores, We Perform the Steps of a New Dawn (東に仰ぐ雄大な八ヶ岳 静かに横たわる諏訪湖の畔で俺たちは夜明けのステップを踏む, Higashi ni Aogu Yūdaina Yatsugatake Shizuka ni Yokotawaru Suwa-ko no Hotori de Ore-tachi wa Yoake no Suteppu o Fumu)

Lui (ルイ, Rui)
Voiced by: Shinya Takahashi
Moe (モエ)
Voiced by: Shiori Izawa

=== Dance Road ===
Jey El (ジェイ・エル, Jei Eru)
Voiced by: Anri Katsu
A world famous dancer whose dance moves bring inspiration to many.
Master T (マスターT, Masutā Tī)
Voiced by: Hiromichi Tezuka
A mysterious man who is often seen wearing various disguises and performing moonwalks}.Sometimes seen observing talented dancers.
Hugh Witt (ヒュー・ウィット, Hyū Witto)
Voiced by: Katsuki Donoshita
Jey El's butler.
MC Butz (MCバッツ, Emushī Battsu)
Voiced by: Yutaka Furukawa
The MC of the Dance Road tournament.

=== Other characters ===
Tetsuo Tobitatsu (飛竜 テツオ)
Voiced by: Masaharu Tahara
Haneru's father.
Mariko Tobitatsu (飛竜 マリコ)
Voiced by: Misa Kobayashi
Haneru's mother.
Wakui (涌井)
Voiced by: Shinya Takahashi
A security guard at the Memorial Hall where Haneru and Kanon originally practise.
Ayumu Itou (伊藤 アユム, Itō Ayumu)
Voiced by: Atsumi Tanezaki
Kanon's best friend and classmate.

== Media ==
=== Anime ===
The series, produced by Sunrise and later BN Pictures, aired on TV Asahi in Japan between September 28, 2014, and October 4, 2015, and was simulcast by Crunchyroll. The series is directed by Masaya Fujimori and written by Atsuhiro Tomioka, with character design by Yoshiaki Yanagida and music production by Avex Proworks and A-bee. The opening theme is "Heartbeat" performed by Lol. The series is licensed in North America by Sentai Filmworks. Like a few anime television series that are broadcast on TV Asahi. The anime incorporates all the credits into the opening theme and there is no ending theme or ending for the show. A first for Sunrise's anime television series since it aired on TV Asahi.

=== Video game ===
A video game by Bandai Namco Entertainment, titled Tribe Cool Crew: The G@me (トライブクルクル THE G@ME), was released on May 28, 2015, for the Nintendo 3DS.
