= List of Is It Wrong to Try to Pick Up Girls in a Dungeon? light novels =

Is It Wrong to Try to Pick Up Girls in a Dungeon? is a Japanese light novel series written by Fujino Ōmori and illustrated by Suzuhito Yasuda. The story follows the exploits of Bell Cranel, a 14-year-old solo adventurer under the goddess Hestia. As the only member of the Hestia Familia, he works hard every day in the dungeon to make ends meet while seeking to improve himself. He looks up to Ais Wallenstein, a famous and powerful swordswoman who once saved his life, and with whom he fell in love. He is unaware that several other girls, deities and mortals alike, also develop affections towards him; most notably Hestia herself, as he also gains allies and improves himself with each new challenge he faces.SB Creative has published the light novels since January 15, 2013 under their GA Bunko imprint. As of October 11, 2025, twenty-one volumes have been published. The series has estimated sales of over 1,500,000 copies. Yen Press has licensed the series in North America and released the first volume under the Yen On imprint in December 2014. The light novel ranked at No. 4 in 2014 in Takarajimasha's annual light novel guide book Kono Light Novel ga Sugoi!.

== Volume list ==
=== Is It Wrong to Try to Pick Up Girls in a Dungeon? ===
No.	Original release date	Original ISBN	English release date	English ISBN
1	January 15, 2013	978-4-7973-7280-9	December 16, 2014	978-0-316-33915-5
Prologue: "Is It Wrong To Try To Pick Up Girls In A Dungeon?"; Chapter 1: "World, Reality, And Desire"; Chapter 2: "That's Why I Run"; Chapter 3: "Night Before Awakening"; Chapter 4: "That's Why I Want to Help"; Chapter 5: "The Goddess's Prank"; Chapter 6: "Bump of Chicken"; Epilogue: "Familia Myth"
2	February 15, 2013	978-4-7973-7307-3	April 21, 2015	978-0-316-34014-4
Prologue: "Weakling's Grin"; Chapter 1: "Date, Then Supporter"; Chapter 2: "The Supporter's Situation"; Interlude: "Cry Out, Goddess"; Chapter 3: "Magic, Magic That Summons A Lap"; Chapter 4: "Divine Wine"; Chapter 5: "Reset"; Epilogue: "Backstage"
3	May 15, 2013	978-4-7973-7362-2	August 18, 2015	978-0-316-34015-1
Prologue: "Alea Jacta Est"; Chapter 1: "The Kenki Approaches"; Chapter 2: "Ox and Hare Special Training"; Chapter 3: "Black Raid"; Chapter 4: "The Meaning of Adventure"; Chapter 5: "A Hero's Desire"; Epilogue: "Page 0 → Page 1"
"...you're a coward"
4	December 14, 2013	978-4-7973-7514-5	December 15, 2015	978-0-316-34016-8
Prologue: "Fastest Boy in the Alleys"; Chapter 1: "Denatus"; Chapter 2: "Changing Environment, New Relationships"; Chapter 3: "The Smith's Situation"; Epilogue: "Next Stage"; Short Story 1: "Quest X Quest"; Short Story 2: "A Campanella to the Goddess"
5	May 15, 2014	978-4-7973-7714-9	April 19, 2016	978-0-316-31479-4
Prologue: "The First Omen"; Chapter 1: "The Middle Levels"; Chapter 2: "How Many Meders to a Safe Return?"; Chapter 3: "Dungeon Death March"; Chapter 4: "Dungeon Resort?"; Chapter 5: "The Outlaws' Party"; Chapter 6: "Praise to the Heroes"; Epilogue: "The One Who Targets the Rabbit"
6	November 14, 2014	978-4-7973-8058-3	August 23, 2016	978-0-316-39416-1
Prologue: "Evil in the Moonlit Night"; Chapter 1: "The Furious Rabbit"; Chapter 2: "Shall We Dance?"; Chapter 3: "Outbreak"; Chapter 4: "Those Who Gather"; Chapter 5: "Our War Game"; Epilogue: "Hestia Familia"
7	April 14, 2015	978-4-7973-8311-9	December 13, 2016	978-0-316-39417-8
Prologue: "The Divine Are Mercilessly Erotic Royalty"; Chapter 1: "Smooth Sailing?"; Chapter 2: "Run, Cranell"; Chapter 3: "Agony of the Fox and the Rabbit"; Chapter 4: "Yoshiwara X Utakata"; Chapter 5: "Killing Stone"; Chapter 6: "Yearning of a Hero"; Epilogue: "If Surrounded by Kindness..."
8	June 13, 2015	978-4-7973-8314-0	April 18, 2017	978-0-316-39418-5
Prologue: "Attack of the War God"; Chapter 1: "Love Song to a God Of Martial Arts"; Chapter 2: "The Prum's Proposal"; Chapter 3: "Love Song to a Goddess Of The Forge"; Chapter 4: "Beloved Bodyguard"; Chapter 5: "The City Girl's Secret"; Chapter 6: "A Certain Goddess's Love Song"; Epilogue: "Birthday"
9	September 12, 2015	978-4-7973-8500-7	September 19, 2017	978-0-316-56264-5
Prologue: "Chance Meeting"; Chapter 1: "An Irregular Girl"; Chapter 2: "Daily Life With a Vouivre Girl"; Chapter 3: "The World and Reality And Monsters"; Chapter 4: "Mission"; Chapter 5: "Heretics"; Epilogue: "Boundless Malice"
10	May 14, 2016	978-4-7973-8677-6	December 12, 2017	978-0-316-44245-9
Interlude: "Notes of Obsession"; Chapter 6: "Before the Storm"; Chapter 7: "The King of Atrocity"; Chapter 8: "City Panic"; Chapter 9: "Dreams of Beasts"; Chapter 10: "The Fool"; Epilogue: "The Decision's Cost"
11	October 15, 2016	978-4-7973-8812-1	June 12, 2018	978-0-316-44247-3
Prologue: "The Lost Ones"; Chapter 1: "The White Rabbit Brought Low"; Chapter 2: "Diverging Strands, Intersecting Plans"; Chapter 3: "The Night Before Battle"; Chapter 4: "A Skirmish in Daedalus Street"; Interlude: "Three Orphans, a Cry in the Night, and a Bloody Maze"; Chapter 5: "Ultra Soul!"; Chapter 6: "A Deity's Scheme"; Chapter 7: "The Return of the Hero"; Epilogue: "And So I Start to Run Again"
12	May 24, 2017	978-4-7973-9280-7	October 30, 2018	978-1-9753-5478-7
Prologue: "Deities and Blood and Familias and Stories"; Chapter 1: "Rabbit Close-Up"; Chapter 2: "Adventure Intermission"; Chapter 3: "New World ~ Water Island ~"; Chapter 4: "A Hunter At The Water's Edge"; Chapter 5: "Bride of the Water Capital"; Chapter 6: "The Hero's Sacred Flame"; Epilogue: "Gale Wind's News"
13	February 14, 2018	978-4-7973-9356-9	March 19, 2019	978-1-9753-2819-1
Prologue: "You'll Be Back"; Chapter 1: "Young Cranell's Case File"; Chapter 2: "The Prophetess of Tragedy"; Chapter 3: "The True Intentions of Gale Wind"; Chapter 4: "Countdown"; Chapter 5: "Calamity Arrives"; Chapter 6: "And So They Spin Their Cruel Fate"
14	December 15, 2018	978-4-7973-9620-1	December 31, 2019	978-1-9753-8501-9
Intermission: "They Begin to Stir"; Chapter 7: "Poem of Despair, Poem of Triumph"; Chapter 8: "The Voice of the Hammer"; Chapter 9: "Hello, Deep Levels"; Chapter 10: "The White Magic Palace"; Special Chapter: "Recollection of Justice"; Chapter 11: "Where the Will to Kill Leads"; Special Chapter: "Reminiscence of Justice"; Chapter 12: "Forlorn Hope in the Dungeon"; Chapter 13: "Beyond a Thousand Darknesses"; Epilogue: "You’ll Be Back II"
15	June 14, 2019	978-4-7973-9622-5	December 1, 2020	978-1-9753-1610-5
Prologue: "Adventurers’ Rest"; Interlude: "Growth, the Present, and Rye Bread"; Chapter 1: "A Day of Departure, a Day of Beginning"; Interlude: "My Home, My Familia"; Chapter 2: "Hey, World"; Interlude: "Does Cinderella Dream of Happiness?"; Chapter 3: "The Cinder Girl"; Interlude: "I, His Adviser"; Chapter 4: "Guild Alone"; Interlude: "That Never-Cooling Iron"; Chapter 5: "Blue Flame"; Interlude: "Elven Unrest"; Chapter 6: "Meetings and Oaths"; Interlude: "The Striving Princess and the Watchful Shinobi"; Chapter 7: "Tales of Times Past: The Black Bird and the Golden Fox"; Epilogue: "Hero’s Elegy"
16	October 14, 2020	978-4-8156-0756-2	July 27, 2021	978-1-9753-3351-5
Prologue: "The Threshold Between Oridinary Friendship and Yearning"; Prologue II: "The Girl’s Wish"; Chapter 1: "A Stormy Love Letter"; Monologue 1; Chapter 2: "A Tearful and Painful Festival Eve"; Monologue 2; Chapter 3: "Harvest Festival"; Monologue 3; Chapter 4: "Full Princess Panic!"; Monologue 4; Chapter 5: "The Proof of ( )"; Monologue 5; Fragment: "Syr’s Origin"; Chapter 6: The Wish’s Cost"; Epilogue: "Alea Iacta Est II"
17	April 22, 2021	978-4-8156-0981-8	September 6, 2022	978-1-9753-4565-5
Prologue: "Super Orario RPG"; Chapter 1: "The Opening of Hostilities"; Chapter 2: "Alone Inside a Sandbox"; Chapter 3: "The Field of Battle"; Chapter 4: "Those Left Behind"; Chapter 5: "The End of Her World"; Double Role I
She gives up insisting how to do it and goes extreme for the target.
18	January 24, 2023	978-4-8156-1371-6; 978-4-8156-1871-1 (SE)	January 23, 2024	978-1-9753-7391-7
Double Role II; Chapter 6: "Megami Tensei ~Orario Revelation~"; Chapter 7: "We’re Getting Married Once This Battle Is Over"; Monologue VI; Chapter 8: "The Great Familia War"; Chapter 9: "Flower Language for You"; Epilogue: "Double Cast"
19	September 15, 2023	978-4-8156-1970-1	August 20, 2024	978-1-9753-9340-3
Prologue: "A Story From the Sea"; Chapter 1: "V-V-V for Victory Party"; Chapter 2: "School Heaven and Hell"; Chapter 3: "School Life in Another World"; Chapter 4: "Study, Reflect, Experiment, Advance"; Chapter 5: "My Dream"; Epilogue: "And So I Start to Run"
20	December 15, 2024	978-4-8156-2869-7; 978-4-8156-3293-9 (SE)	August 11, 2026	979-8-8554-3785-0
Prologue: "Hero Afterglow"; Chapter 1: "Orario Rumble"; Chapter 2: "The Lion and the Sword Princess"; Chapter 3: "The World, the Festival, and the Truth"; Chapter 4: "Knight Afterglow"; Epilogue: "Beautiful World"
21	October 11, 2025	978-4-8156-3294-6; 978-4-8156-3293-9 (SE)	March 9, 2027	979-8-8554-4470-4
22	February 12, 2027	978-4-8156-4290-7; 978-4-8156-4289-1 (SE)	—	—

=== Familia Chronicle ===
The Familia Chronicle light novels are a series of side stories that go more in-depth on characters that do not get as much attention in the main storylines of Danmachi and Sword Oratoria.

No.	Title	Original release date	English release date
1	Episode Lyu; Episode Ryu (Episodeリュー)	March 15, 2017; 978-4-7973-9080-3	June 26, 2018; 978-0-316-44825-3
2	Episode Freya; Episode Freya (episodeフレイヤ)	December 12, 2019; 978-4-8156-0464-6	October 20, 2020; 978-1-9753-2755-2
3	Episode Lyu 2 Episode Ryu 2 (Episodeリュー2)	October 14, 2023; 978-4-8156-2369-2	May 6, 2025; 979-8-8554-0951-2
4	Episode Asfi; Episode Asfi (Episodeアスフィ)	October 11, 2025; 978-4-8156-3297-7	December 8, 2026; 979-8-8554-3951-9
5	Episode Heith; Episode Heith (Episodeヘイズ)	May 15, 2026; 978-4-8156-4067-5	—
6	Episode Amid; Episode Amid (Episodeアミッド)	February 12, 2027; 978-4-8156-4293-8	—

=== Minor Myths and Legends ===
The Minor Myths and Legends light novels are compilations of the main storylines and short stories from Danmachi and Sword Oratoria with new content.

No.	Original release date	Original ISBN	English release date	English ISBN
1	April 14, 2023	978-4-8156-1966-4	March 18, 2025	979-8-8554-1098-3
2	May 15, 2023	978-4-8156-1967-1	June 10, 2025	979-8-8554-1100-3

=== Argonaut ===
The Argonaut light novels are a prequel to the main storylines of Danmachi and Sword Oratoria.

No.	Original release date	Original ISBN	English release date	English ISBN
1	July 14, 2023	978-4-8156-1968-8	November 10, 2026	979-8-8554-2355-6
2	August 31, 2023	978-4-8156-1969-5	March 9, 2027	979-8-8554-2357-0
