= Wistoria: Wand and Sword =

Japanese manga series

- First tankōbon volume cover, featuring Will Serfort

杖と剣のウィストリア (Tsue to Tsurugi no Wisutoria)
- Genre: Adventure; Fantasy
- Manga
- Written by: Fujino Ōmori
- Illustrated by: Toshi Aoi
- Published by: Kodansha
- English publisher: NA: Kodansha USA
- Imprint: Shōnen Magazine Comics
- Magazine: Bessatsu Shōnen Magazine
- Original run: December 9, 2020 – present
- Volumes: 16
- Light novel

Wistoria: Wand and Sword - Grimo Acta
- Written by: Fujino Ōmori
- Illustrated by: Yuunagi
- Published by: SB Creative
- English publisher: NA: Yen Press
- Imprint: GA Bunko
- Original run: July 14, 2024 – present
- Volumes: 2
- Anime television series
- Directed by: Tatsuya Yoshihara (Note: Credited as chief director for season 2.); Hideaki Nakano (S2)
- Written by: Tatsuya Yoshihara (S1); Noboru Kimura (S2)
- Music by: Yuki Hayashi; Luke Standridge (Note: Uncredited music composers.); Asa Taylor
- Studio: Actas; BN Pictures
- Licensed by: Crunchyroll (streaming); SEA: Muse Communication
- Original network: JNN (TBS), AT-X, BS NTV
- Original run: July 7, 2024 – present
- Episodes: 24
- icon

Wistoria: Wand and Sword (Japanese: 杖と剣のウィストリア, Hepburn: Tsue to Tsurugi no Wisutoria) is a Japanese manga series written by Fujino Ōmori and illustrated by Toshi Aoi. It began serialization in Kodansha's shōnen manga magazine Bessatsu Shōnen Magazine in December 2020, with its chapters collected in 16 tankōbon volumes as of August 2026. An anime television series adaptation produced by Actas and BN Pictures aired from July to September 2024. A second season aired from April to June 2026. A third season has been announced.

== Plot ==
Hundreds of years ago an invasion from the sky came close to destroying the world. Five mages cast a barrier to ward off the enemy set atop a tower called the Mercedes Caulis. The Rigarden Magical Academy gained magicians, including those strong enough to become Magia Vander who can maintain the barrier that protects the kingdom.

Will Serfort is a Rigarden student who swore to become a magician strong enough to be accepted into the Mercedes Caulis and reunite with his childhood friend, Elfaria Albis Serfort, the youngest magician ever to become a Magia Vander. However, Will has no magic aptitude at all, having managed to progress on his studies so far with the perfect scores on written tests and the extra credits obtained from hunting monsters in the school's dungeon, but only a few people know his true power, as what he lacks in magic, he makes up with his swordsmanship, capable of defeating powerful monsters that even the strongest magicians have difficulties against. As Will keeps pushing toward his dream, he makes friends and enemies along the way while showing his true powers which shake the very foundations of the world.

== Characters ==
=== Main characters ===
Will Serfort (ウィル・セルフォルト, Wiru Seruforuto)
Voiced by: Kōhei Amasaki (Japanese); Corey Wilder, Amanda Gael (young) (English)
The main protagonist. He is a sixth-year student at Rigarden Magical Academy and childhood friend of the Magia Vander Elfaria due to his lack of magical aptitude, he is ostracized by his peers and even his teachers; however, he possesses superhuman physical abilities and talent with the sword. He remains determined to climb the tower to reunite with Elfaria and keep his promise to her to reach the top with her.
At some point, Will discovers he possesses an ability called "Wis," which allows him to absorb spells or channel them through his sword; he thus embodies the union of wand and sword.

- Kiki (キキ)
  Voiced by: Aoi Inase (Japanese); Lynsey Hale (English)
  Will's pet familiar, a carbuncle capable of casting reflective magic.

Elfaria Albis Serfort (エルファリア・アルヴィス・セルフォルト, Erufaria Aruvisu Seruforuto)
Voiced by: Akira Sekine (Japanese); Kelsey Cruz (English)
Will's childhood friend and love interest. She is a prodigious and born-genius mage who specializes in ice and water spells, Elfaria managed to carve her name into history by becoming the youngest Magia Vander at the age of ten and by creating twelve original spells which is an unprecedented feat. While publicly known for her talent and beauty being called the Hallowed Icemaiden but in reality she is a lazy girl who neglects her work and harbors an almost obsessive love for Will, as a child, Elfaria was a mischievous and chaotic girl it was during that same period that she and Will made a promise of becoming Magia Vanders and reach the top of the tower together. Currently, she remains in the tower, watching over Will and protecting the barrier.

=== Rigarden Student Academy ===
==== Students ====
===== Will's Group =====
Colette Loire (コレット・ロワール, Koretto Rowāru)
Voiced by: Satomi Amano (Japanese); Corey Pettit (English)
Will's classmate and one of his few friends, who interferes whenever their classmates bully him. She has a crush on him, which is obvious to everyone except him. However, she is too shy to confess. After graduating, she joins the Earth Faction and is later made their mascot known as the "Earth Princess" for her skill, much to her displeasure. It is also implied that she is a descendent of a former Magia Vander.
While she specializes in earth magic, due to her bloodline she actually possesses a huge mana capacity capable of rivaling Magia Vanders in terms of output, although she uses a bracelet that restrains her mana due to her lack of control over it.
Sion Ulster (シオン・アルスター, Shion Arusutā)
Voiced by: Masaaki Mizunaka (Japanese); Brandon Acosta (English)
One of Will's classmates who used to bully him. However, after witnessing his true strength, he develops a begrudging one-sided rivalry with him. He also has unreciprocated feelings for Colette, further driving his rivalry with Will. After graduating, he joins the Fire Faction.
He specializes in fire magic and his skills have only grown since starting his rivalry with Will.
Julius Reinberg (ユリウス・レインバーグ, Yuriusu Reinbāgu)
Voiced by: Tetsuya Kakihara (Japanese); Aaron Michael (English)
One of the three top students in Will's class. Being a noble, he initially had a very arrogant demeanor. After Will publicly defeated him, however, he mellowed out and even agreed to team up with him for the sake of graduating from the academy. After graduating, he joined the Ice Faction.
He specialized in ice magic, being the only person capable of replicating one of Elfaria's original spells.
Wignall Lindor (イグノール・リンドール, Igunōru Rindōru)
Voiced by: Kengo Kawanishi (Japanese); Blake McNamara (English)
One of the three top students in Will's class. He is an elf shunned by his peers since his magic is weak by their standards. Initially presenting an arrogant facade, he comes to respect Will after he helps him overcome his self-esteem issues. He is also the childhood friend of one of the Magia Vander, Ellenor, mirroring Will's relationship with Elfaria. After graduating from the academy, he joins the all-elf Fantasy Faction.
He specializes in wind and illusion magic and later becomes capable of using his race's unique ability to turn illusions into reality.
Lihanna Owenzaus (リアーナ・オーウェンザウス, Riāna Ōwenzausu)
Voiced by: Lynn (Japanese); Erin Kelly Noble (English)
One of the three top students in Will's class who aims to become a Magia Vander to save her noble family from ruin. After learning of Will's strength, she allies herself with him, Sion, Julius, and Wignall to graduate from the academy. After graduating, she joins the Thunder Faction along with Will.
She is a close combat mage known as a "magic knight" specializing in lightning magic, which she uses to enhance her physical abilities.

===== Other Students =====
Rosti Nowman (ロスティ・ナウマン, Rosuti Nauman)
Voiced by: Unknown
A student at Rigarden and Will's roommate who professed to have been in love with him and had a slightly androgynous appearance. He is heavily implied to be a gender-bend clone of Elfaria that she controls remotely through magic.
He is a talented magic artificer who made magical items for Will to use.
Iris X. Stellamaris (アイリス・X・ステラマリス, Airisu X Suteramarisu)
Voiced by: Rumi Okubo (Japanese); Monica Rial (English)
One of the students in Rigarden. Though she presents a sociable and clumsy facade to her peers, she is actually a serious girl and a Watcher, talented young magicians who serve as scouts to recruit new members for the Magia Vanders' factions, a position regarded as an urban legend among the student body. She is also a member of the Ice Faction and told by Elfaria to assess Will's progress. When scouting for talented students in the dungeon, she meets Will and witnesses him defeat a powerful dungeon boss single-handedly. During a meeting with the Magia Vander, she deems him the only student of note and recommends he be immediately scouted for a position in the Tower. She has a crush on Will due to his capability.
Gordon Vally (ゴードン・バレー, Gōdon Barē)
Voiced by: Kazuki Ura (Japanese); Michael Stimac (English)
Lyril Mars (リリール・マース, Rirīru Māsu)
Voiced by: Tomohiro Ōno (Japanese); Tristan Bonner (English)
Renaisse Arette (ルナイス・アレート, Runaisu Arēto)
Voiced by: Shinya Takahashi
Jorua Moraine (ジョルア・モレーン, Jorua Morēn)
Voiced by: Atsushi Tamaru

==== Faculty and Staff ====
Workner Norgram (ワークナー・ノーグラム, Wākunā Nōguramu)
Voiced by: Tomokazu Seki (Japanese); Jim Foronda (English)
A teacher at Rigarden Magic Academy. He believes in Will's potential and oversees his progress in the dungeon.
He specializes in handling magical familiars.
Edward Serfence (エドワルド・セルフェンス, Edowarudo Serufensu)
Voiced by: Kōji Yusa (Japanese); Phil Parsons (English)
A teacher at Rigarden Magic Academy who is infamous for his strictness. Having failed to become a Magia Vander in the past, he wants Will to give up on his goal, not wanting the boy to suffer the same failure as himself, even if it means having to sabotage him.
He is the strongest teacher at the academy, specializing in dark magic.
Caldron Anouve (コルドロン・アヌーブ, Korudoron Anūbu)
Voiced by: Reiko Suzuki (old), Sayaka Ohara (young) (Japanese); Linda Leonard (English)
The headmaster of Rigarden Magic Academy. She is 64 years old but can use magic to appear much younger than she is in order to live a double life. She helps Will train and learn Wis in order to impress scouts and join a faction.
Eliza Nosferat (エリザ・ノスフェラート, Eriza Nosuferaato)
Voiced by: Ami Koshimizu (Japanese); Monet Tatianna Lerner (English)
A teacher at Regarden Magical Academy teaching Nightwalker Ecology and Arcane Magic.
She specializes in Dark Magic, and as a member of the Nosferat family she has access to the Nosefer Sique spells.

=== Mercedes Caulis / The Tower ===
==== Magia Vander ====
Aaron Masterias Oldking (アロン・マステリアス・オールドキング, Aron Masuteriasu Ōrudokingu)
Voiced by: Hōchū Ōtsuka (Japanese); Greg Dulcie (English)
The leader of the Magia Vander and its oldest member, leading the Light Faction. He often goes on long expeditions, leaving Cariott in charge in his absence.
He specializes in light magic and is noted to be the strongest of the Magia Vander.
Cariott Incindia Wiseman (キャリオット・インスティア・ワイズマン, Kyariotto Insutia Waizuman)
Voiced by: Jun Fukuyama (Japanese); Xan Cramer (English)
One of the Magia Vander, leading the Fire Faction. He is often left in charge of the group whenever Aaron goes on one of his lengthy expeditions. He's also Workner and Edward's old classmate.
He specializes in fire magic.
Ellenor Ljos Alf (エルノール・リヨス・アールヴ, Erunōru Riyosu Āruvu)
Voiced by: Sora Amamiya (Japanese); Molly Searcy (English)
An elf and one of the Magia Vander, leading the all-elf Fairy Faction. She is also a former childhood friend of Wignall until they were separated after her magical talent was discovered, mirroring Elfaria's relationship with Will (although in a more aggressive sense).
She specializes in her race's unique fantasy magic, which can turn illusions into reality.
Zeo Thorzeus Reinbolt (ゼオ・トルゼウス・ラインボルト, Zeo Toruzeusu Rainboruto)
Voiced by: Makoto Furukawa (Japanese); Marcus D. Stimac (English)
One of the Magia Vander, leading the Thunder Faction. Following Will's graduation from the academy, he recruits him into his faction after beating Elfaria in a game of rock-paper-scissor for him, having sensed the boy's potential.
He uses lightning magic and specializes in a technique called "wrathbolt", which enhances his physical abilities using pure magic manipulation.

==== Mages of the Tower ====
Clairie Serah (クレイルウィ・セラ, Kureiruwi Sera)
Voiced by: Mai Nakahara (Japanese); Monica Flatley (English)
A high-mage arbiter of the tower and an old classmate of Workner, Edward, and Carriot's.
As she is a multos, she is able to utilize multiple types of magic.
Sarissa Alfeld (サリサ・アルフェルト, Sarisa Aruferutou)
Voiced by: Ayaka Shimizu (Japanese); Elisa Danielle James (English)
The aide-de-camp of the ice faction who usually spends most of her time scolding Elfaria for neglecting her responsibilities as a Magia Vander.
Guilford Zurgas (ギルフォード・ズルガス, Girufōdo Zurugasu)
The aide-de-camp from the Thunder Faction.
Lefiya Viridis (レフィーヤ・ウィリディス, Refīya Uiridisu)
Voiced by: Juri Kimura
An aide-de-camp of the Elf faction and Ellenor's aide.
Filvis Challia (フィルヴィス・シャリア, Firuvisu Sharia)
Voiced by: Hisako Kanemoto
An aide-de-camp of the Elf faction and Ellenor's aide.
Logwell (ログウェル, Roguweru)
Voiced by: Akio Ōtsuka
The aide-de-camp from the Light Faction and Aaron's assistant.
Kreutz Harlon (クロイツ・ハーロン, Kuroitsu Hāron)
Voiced by: Seiro Ogino (Japanese); John Archer II (English)
Director of the Upper Institute.

=== Goetia ===
A mysterious terrorist organization serving as the series' main antagonists.
Headless (首無し, Kubinashi)
Voiced by: Unknown
One of the enemies of humanity who is a member of Goetia and Marze's partner. In contrast to its name, Headless has no head, instead having what appears to be black smoke where it should be.
Marze (マルゼ, Maruze)
Voiced by: Nobuhiko Okamoto (Japanese); Ben Byrant (English)
A member of Goetia and Headless' partner.
Shade (シェイド, Sheido)
A member of Goetia.
She specializes in puppet magic.

=== Others ===
Finn (フィン, Finn)
Voiced by: Mutsumi Tamura (Japanese); Shannon Emerick (English)
A mysterious member of the Finn tribe and dungeon guide who has an appearance of a 7-year old boy, but has implied to have lived over 500 years. He watches and sometimes mentors over Will's development, where he and Mercedes has plans for to unite wands and swords together and it's objective on a oncoming crisis. Similar to Will, Finn seems to be more proficient with swords rather than magic.
Finn bears many similarities to Finn Deimne from Fujino Omori's other work, DanMachi, especially having the same Japanese and English voice actors, although it is currently unknown whether they are the same character or just bear a strong resemblance.
Mercedes (メルセデス, Merusedesu)
Voiced by: Marina Inoue (Japanese); Brianna Roberts (English)
A central mythological figure of Urbus Regarden as she was the Witch Queen and the first Magia Vander who pioneered the age of magic 500 years prior to the story. Five centuries before the events of the series, she led the final stand for humanity's survival as invaders from the sky ravaged the surface. By capturing primal cosmic forces, she constructed the gargantuan central tower, "Mercedes Caulis," to anchor a permanent barrier against the Celestial Hosts which would become the barrier around Regarden that continues to hold until present day. Her true fate remains unknown following her disappearance during the Tower's construction, though she would continue to appear through residual memories and visions that were instrumental such as Will's internal awakening to Wis, guiding the hidden goal meant to cultivate the ultimate power capable of shattering the world's stagnation and stopping oncoming crises while hoping to achieve the ultimate goal of wands and swords unity.

== Media ==
=== Manga ===
Written by Fujino Ōmori and illustrated by Toshi Aoi, Wistoria: Wand and Sword began serialization in Kodansha's shōnen manga magazine Bessatsu Shōnen Magazine on December 9, 2020. The series ended its first part on May 8, 2023. Its chapters have been collected in 16 tankōbon volumes as of August 2026.

During their panel at Anime NYC, Kodansha USA announced that they licensed the manga for English publication, with the first volume released on November 29, 2022.

==== Volumes ====
No.	Original release date	Original ISBN	North American release date	North American ISBN
1	April 9, 2021	978-4-06-522519-6	November 29, 2022	978-1-64651-560-8
1. Let Me Be Your Sword; 2. Undaunted; 3. The Order & The Watcher, Part 1; 4. The Order & The Watcher, Part 2
Will Serfort is a boy who is in his last year in Regarden Magical Academy despite having no talent for magic at all, having managed to progress on his studies so far with the perfect scores on written tests and the extra credits obtained from hunting monsters in the school's dungeon. When Edward Serfence, one of the teachers discover that he makes up for his lack of magic with his swordsmanship and his outstanding physical abilities, he forces Will to participate in a test where he shall be expelled from the academy should he fails to land a hit on him. Despite all odds against him, Will succeeds. In the occasion, it is revealed that Will's objective is to reunite with his childhood friend, Elfaria Albis Serfort who is one of the Magia Vander, the top magicians in the world, and lives atop Mercedes Caulus, the magic tower that overlooks the academy, but to do so, he must graduate. He later is approached by another student called Iris X. Stellamaris, unaware that she is a graduated magician sent by Elfaria to watch over him.
2	August 6, 2021	978-4-06-524474-6	January 31, 2023 (digital); February 7, 2023 (print)	978-1-64651-624-7
5. Festival Eve; 6. On Your Marks...; 7. Fury's Flame; 8. Between Pride and Passion
3	December 9, 2021	978-4-06-526275-7	March 28, 2023	978-1-64651-742-8
9. El Glace Frosse; 10. Festival Finale; 11. Shall We Date?; 12. Dungeon Dive!
4	April 8, 2022	978-4-06-527520-7	May 23, 2023	978-1-64651-743-5
13. Let the Praxis Begin; 14. A Flood of Nightmares; 15. Our Dream; 16. Defying the Darkness
5	September 9, 2022	978-4-06-529143-6	July 18, 2023	978-1-64651-744-2
17. Rise Above Despair (Note: During serialization, this chapter was published as the 17th and 18th chapters, titled Parts 1 and 2); 18. The True Shape of Cowardice; 19. Wand and Sword; 20. Final Exams
6	January 6, 2023	978-4-06-530335-1	Sep 12, 2023 (digital); October 3, 2023 (print)	978-1-64651-918-7
21. The Terminalia; 22. The Party from Hell Begins; 23. Ballet of Sorrow; 24. Farewell
7	June 8, 2023	978-4-06-531874-4	March 12, 2024	978-1-64651-919-4
25. A Sea of Shards; 26. One Spell; 27. The World's Ode; 28. Thus Begins the Tale
8	October 6, 2023	978-4-06-533145-3	August 13, 2024	979-8-88877-108-2
29. Day of Departure; 30. Colorless Beginnings; 31. First Bloom; 32. With Head Held High
9	February 8, 2024	978-4-06-534548-1	May 27, 2025	979-8-88877-329-1
33. The Limits of Kindness; 34. The Witch's Teachings; 35. Turning the Page; 36. Feelings, Bloomings, Thunderings
10	June 7, 2024	978-4-06-535800-9	November 25, 2025	979-8-88877-465-6
37. A Clash of Ice and Thunder; 38. Ice and Thunder Erupt; 39. Battle for the Sword; 40. Spy, Boys & Girls
11	November 8, 2024	978-4-06-537045-2	January 27, 2026 (digital); February 10, 2026 (print)	979-8-88877-551-6
41. "From Knight to Thunderbolt"; 42. "For Whom the Bird Flies"; 43. "The Puppeteer"; 44. "Abyssal Origin"
12	March 7, 2025	978-4-06-538727-6	March 31, 2026	979-8-88877-646-9
45. "Figures of the Tower"; 46. "A Party Among Kin"; 47. "Feel, Weave, Roar"; 48. "Countdown to War"
13	July 9, 2025	978-4-06-539994-1	September 15, 2026	979-8-88877-819-7
49. "A Great Beginning"; 50. "The War Begins"; 51. "A Game of Shadows"; 52. "A Disastrous Barrier"
14	November 7, 2025	978-4-06-541533-7	—	—
53. "Return of the Ice Prince"; 54. "Ashes Rise"; 55. "In The Palm of Their Hand"; 56. "Baal"
15	April 9, 2026	978-4-06-542964-8	—	—
57. Avatar of the Apocalypse; 58. The Scathing Viper, The Grieving Dragon, The Jeering Vampire, and The Falling Witch; 59. Ego's Plaintive Wails; 60. Eternal Curtain Call; 61. ■■■ Only Knows…
16	August 7, 2026	978-4-06-544605-8	—	—
62. Beyond Regarden; 63. Next Step, Samios; 64. Welcome to Samios; 65. Boy Meets Boy
17	December 9, 2026	978-4-06-546190-7	—	—

==== Chapters not yet in tankōbon format ====
These chapters have yet to be published in a tankōbon volume.

=== Light novel ===
A prequel light novel, titled Wistoria: Wand and Sword - Grimo Acta (杖と剣のウィストリア グリモアクタ, Tsue to Tsurugi no Wistoria Grimo Acta) written by Fujino Ōmori and illustrated by Yuunagi, began publishing on July 14, 2024, by SB Creative under their GA Bunko label. During their panel at Anime North 2026, Yen Press announced that they had licensed the light novel for English publication.

No.	Title	Original release date	English release date
1	Tears of the Beginning; Hajimari no Namida (始まりの涙)	July 14, 2024; 978-4-8156-2639-6	December 8, 2026; 979-8-8554-1966-5
2	The Earth Princess; Tsuchi no Himegimi (土の姫君)	June 13, 2026; 978-4-8156-4066-8	—

=== Anime ===
An anime television series adaptation was announced in February 2024. The series is produced by Actas and BN Pictures and directed and written by Tatsuya Yoshihara, with Sayaka Ono designing the characters and Yuki Hayashi composing the music. It aired from July 7 to September 29, 2024, on TBS and its affiliates. The opening theme is "Fire and Fear" performed by Penguin Research, while the ending theme is "Frozen" performed by True. Crunchyroll streamed the series. Muse Communication licensed the series in Southeast Asia.

Following the airing of the final episode, a second season was announced and premiered on April 12, 2026. The cast and staff from the first season is returning to reprise their roles, with Tatsuya Yoshihara set to serve as the chief director and Hideaki Nakano as director. For the second season, the opening theme is "Believers" performed by Ash Da Hero, while the ending theme is "Reachlight" performed by Shiyui.

Following the airing of the second season's final episode, a third season was announced.

==== Episodes ====
===== Season 1 (2024) =====
No.	Title	Directed by (Note: Production staff information is taken from the ending credits of each episode.)	Storyboarded by	Original release date
1	"Like a Lone Sword"; Transliteration: "Ichi Furi no Tsurugi no Yōni" (Japanese: 一振りの剣(つるぎ)のように)	Tatsuya Yoshihara & Masakazu Yoshimoto	Tatsuya Yoshihara	July 7, 2024
At Rigarden Magical Academy, Will Serfort, an honors student in his sixth and final year who is very knowledgeable in magic despite being unable to use magic himself, is called out by Professor Edward Serfence to use magic and after failing to do so, Edward emphasizes that magic is absolute supremacy. After class, Will is approached by Sion Ulster, an arrogant classmate hailing from a prestigious noble family, and bullies him to remind him that he will never become a Magia Vander, a title for the most powerful wizards, before Will's friend Colette Loire comes to his defense. Will recalls his promise he made to his childhood friend, who became the youngest Magia Vander in history, that serves as his reason for attending magic school. Will sees his advisor, Professor Workner Norgam, after another dungeon raid and Workner tries to convince him to give up since graduating without any spellwork credits is practically impossible. Needing four credits in two days to avoid flunking out, he sets out to the sixth floor of the dungeon to fight a Baskerville. Sion overhears their conversation and heads to the sixth floor himself to defeat the Baskerville before Will has a chance to ensure his expulsion, but encounters a Sentinel, a ten-credit monster normally found in deeper floors. Sion is powerless against the Sentinel, but Will arrives and uses his master swordsmanship to easily defeat the monster to earn ten credits and meet the quota required to stay in school.
2	"As Though Undaunted"; Transliteration: "Fukutsu no Gotoku" (Japanese: 不屈のごとく)	Takahiko Usui	Takahiko Usui & Isuta	July 14, 2024
Five years ago, Will started school not long after his childhood friend Elfaria Albis Serfort became a Magia Vander, and despite his inability to use magic, impressed the headmaster Caldron Anouve with his swordsmanship, who envisions his sword being a wand. Back in the present, Workner explains in a class lecture what ascending the tower means as the next step to becoming a Magia Vander is to advance to the Upper Institute, either by inventing a new magic or earning a large number of credits with the latter being the conventional route but the former being Will's only realistic route. After class, Will runs into Sion, who takes out his anger at Will for defeating the Sentinel. Meanwhile, Edward demands Caldron to expel Will for failing spellwork despite acing all other subjects. Caldron agrees to do so if he fails a special test administered by Edward. While studying in the library with Colette, Edward summons Will to the magic hall for the test where Will's objective is to land a hit on Edward. Without his sword, Will struggles, but after Colette delivers Will his sword that he had put in his locker earlier, he slices through Edward's magic and attacks from his blind spot from above to graze is face and pass the test.
3	"Order & Watcher"	Ayataka Tanemura	Ayataka Tanemura	July 21, 2024
Will reveals that his goggles he wears when fighting are a parting gift from Elfaria after she graduated from the academy. Back in the present, Will finishes his morning job to deliver newspapers that reveal that Elfaria invented a new magic, and subsequently passes down an order to the academy to collect Frost Walker cores. Will asks his roommate Rosti Nauman to craft a magical item for this order. Afterwards, Will goes to the fourth floor of the dungeon where he saves the student Iris Churchill, who claims to be once saved by Elfaria. Will and Iris go looking for Frost Walkers on the fourth floor and encounter an unusually strong one called the Frost Rex. With Will's swordsmanship and knowledge about the Frost Rex, he ties up the monster and uses explosives Rosti made to defeat it. Iris is revealed to be the watcher Iris X. Stellamaris who was sent by Elfaria to pose as a student and keep watch on Will. Iris reports to the Magia Vander and puts in a recommendation for Will to take a tower position with the Fated Day just around the corner, but the Magia Vanders object. With the Grand Festival coming, they decide to hold off on deciding on tower positions until after the festival.
4	"The Eve of the Grand Festival"; Transliteration: "Taisai Zen'ya" (Japanese: 大祭前夜)	Takashi Kojima	Masashi Ikeda	August 4, 2024
Lihanna Owenzaus, Wignall Lindor, and Julius Reinberg are revealed as the top students in terms of credits earned and are advancing the Upper Institute. The biennial Grand Magic Festival, a competition between the four tower factions, approaches with Will planning to skip it like last time after embarrassing himself during the event in his second year despite Colette suggesting he should enter. Will and Colette go to their lockers and they find a hidden passageway in one of their lockers that leads to an underground gambling ring for the festival. That night, Will goes to work at his night job at Gina's tavern, a tavern frequented by dwarves, with Rosti. Julius and two of his buddies drop by to insult the dwarves, and Will stands up to defend them and demand Julius to apologize. Will and Julius fight with Will taking out his buddies, but Julius freezing Will in place. Julius decides that he will finish him off at the festival and demands Will to enter it.
5	"Raise the Starting Pistol"; Transliteration: "Gōhō o Ageyo" (Japanese: 号砲を上げよ)	Morihito Abe	Morihito Abe	August 11, 2024
The Grand Magic Festival begins and Iris is one of the scouts there focusing specifically on Will. The main event is the Crown Attack, where the objective is to navigate through the traps and battle the other students to take the crown at the goal in teams of three with Will teaming up with Colette and Sion. Will charges in equipped with magical gauntlets with Colette covering for him, and he uses his knowledge and swordsmanship to defeat the enemies. However, Julius gets ahead of him and attacks Will with his ice magic. Sion responds by casting a powerful fire spell but then turns his attacks on Will and demands that Will faces Sion in a duel despite being teammates for the event.
6	"Between Pride and Passion"; Transliteration: "Kyōji to Netsujō no Ma" (Japanese: 矜持と熱情の間)	Hideaki Nakano	Hideaki Nakano	August 18, 2024
As Will and Sion engage in battle, Sion recalls the time he first met Will and took out his anger on him for being somebody who cannot use magic. Sion dares Will to attack, but Will refuses to attack a teammate understanding the situation. Elsewhere, Colette and Julius fight and the students watching in the stadium notice that unbeknownst to the competitors, Julius made clones of himself to attack the other teams. Wignall notices this right away and takes out the clone sent to attack his team. Will attempts to run away, but Sion cuts off his escape route by summoning his guardian deity Halcon to attack him. Having no choice but to fight back, Will easily reads Halcon's moves and defeats it. Just as Will and Sion were about to deliver the decisive blow, Colette intervenes and tells Will to go after Julius after she dispatched his clone. Will runs towards the stadium to challenge Julius to a duel.
7	"Twelve Secret Ice Magics, El Glace Frosse"; Transliteration: "Eru・Gurasu・Furōsu" (Japanese: 十二の氷秘法(エル・グラス・フロース))	Takahiko Usui	Takahiko Usui	August 25, 2024
The Ice Faction's aide-de-camp Sarissa Alfeld presents Elfaria with a recommendation for Julius to become her successor. Will and Julius have their duel to decide the winner of the Crown Attack event, and Julius uses his illusion spell, called Ars Weiss, to overwhelm Will and freeze him in place, and then brags to the crowd that he has mastered the El Glace Frosse, a series of 12 ice magic spells created by Elfaria. But Will, using his extensive knowledge of the magic having been around Elfaria his whole life, notices that Julius has not mastered Ars Weiss as his teammates are controlling the clones, and Will takes out the teammates with an attack from their blind spot. Then Will locates the real Julius using the difference in temperature and attacks him, pointing out that Elfaria created the magic at age 2. Julius summons eight clones despite being able to master control of only four to launch a desperate attack on Will. Will easily dodges the attacks and defeats Julius. However, Wignall's team wins the event having taken the crown while Will and Julius were busy fighting each other.
8	"Shall we date?"	Takahiro Enokida	Takahiro Enokida	September 1, 2024
Will celebrates his victory over Julius at Gina's tavern with Colette, Rosti, and Workner, with Julius washing dishes for the night as punishment. Sometime later, the students are looking to form teams for the all-student praxis and Will is highly sought after due to his performance at the festival. The next day, Will spends his day off going shopping with Colette and Rosti. Colette feels uneasy, especially when Rosti keeps getting in between her and Will. While Will gets maintenance on his sword, Colette and Rosti talk about the matter in private. On the way to the blacksmith, Will encounters Lihanna, who asks Will to form a party with her, Julius, Sion, and Wignall. After hearing that Lihanna needs to become a Magia Vander to save her family from ruin, Will accepts the invitation and Colette joins him as well. A few days later, the all-student praxis begins where the lower floors of the dungeon are temporarily unlocked, giving students the opportunity to earn large amounts of credits, but due to the high danger that some students get killed.
9	"Praxis Begins"; Transliteration: "Jisshū Kaishi" (Japanese: 実習開始)	Takashi Kojima	Itsuki Tsuchigami	September 8, 2024
As the all-student praxis begins, Will's party jumps ahead of the competition while making quick work of weaker monsters. However, Will is unable to earn any credits, since his teammates all defeat their enemies before he can act. Lihanna explains that their objective is to defeat the 10th floor's boss, worth 110 credits. However, upon reaching it, they find it is already dead and are ambushed by an even stronger monster, which destroys the ground and causes them to fall to the 11th floor, which only high mages may enter. During the fall, the party also got separated: Will with Wignall, Colette with Lihanna, and Sion with Julius. Meanwhile, a monster stampede destroys the academy's camp, with some professors being killed by two mysterious mages, causing the praxis to get canceled. Back with Will, he and Wignall venture through the floor to locate their comrades but the latter doubts the former's abilities and stubbornly refuses help. However, after Will saves him from a monster that he failed to defeat himself, Wignall breaks down, revealing that, while a powerful mage by human standards, his skills are mediocre compared to his fellow elves.
10	"Our Dreams"; Transliteration: "Bokutachi no Yume" (Japanese: ボクたちのユメ)	Masakazu Yoshimoto	Tatsuya Yoshihara	September 15, 2024
Wignall explains that his illusion magic lacks physical mass and he is thus considered inferior to other elves, especially in comparison with his childhood friend: the Magia Vander Ellenor Ljos Alf. However, Will begins bonding with him over this, as they are both "no-talents". They are then attacked by monsters immune to physical and most magical attacks known as Balkars. With Will's encouragement, Wignall manages to overcome his inferiority complex and defeat their enemies by giving his illusions form, causing him to start respecting Will. Meanwhile, the instructors evacuate the remaining students while Workner and Edward head out to look for Will's party, the only ones still missing. Back with Will, he and Wignall find Sion and Julius. Elsewhere, Colette and Lihanna are attacked by the mysterious mages who destroyed the academy camp, Marze and Headless. Fortunately, Will and the others come to their aid, reuniting the party. Headless then uses transportation magic to summon the monster that caused the party to fall to the 11th floor: an Evil Grand Duke; a 270-credit monster.
11	"The True Name of Cowards"; Transliteration: "Okubyō-sha no mana" (Japanese: 臆病者の真名)	Masahiro Takata & Kentarō Mizuno	Hironori Tanaka	September 22, 2024
With the way out of the 11th floor blocked by monsters, Will's party is forced to face the Evil Grand Duke. Will formulates a plan that involves teaching Elfaria's trick to keep incantations going across Ars Weiss clones to Julius, allowing him to immobilize their enemy with his strongest spell. Lihanna then attempts to kill it, but her attack is blocked by a barrier Marze and Headless placed on it. Will saves Lihanna from the Duke's counterattack, but it breaks the goggles he got from Elfaria in the process, shattering his spirit. As Lihanna and Wignall hold off the Duke, Sion considers fleeing, but Will asks him to beat him up, which he does, helping him focus again. Colette tells Sion that Will is scared but refuses to run, causing all three to rejoin the fight. However, their efforts are not enough. Will then notices a crystal next to him, which Rosti secretly gave him, and recalls previously suppressed memories. After remembering, he has Sion fire a spell at him and absorbs it into his sword using a power called "Wis". Will then kills the Duke in a single blow.
12	"Wand and Sword"; Transliteration: "Tsue to Tsurugi" (Japanese: 杖と剣)	Hideaki Nakano & Takahiko Usui	Hideaki Nakano & Takahiko Usui	September 29, 2024
Before dying, the Duke calls on lower-ranked monsters to attack Will's party, who are too exhausted to fight back. Fortunately, they are saved by the timely arrival of the Magia Vander Aaron Masterias Oldking, who single-handedly destroys the monsters. Will then notices Aaron's dungeon guide, a young-looking man called Finn. Elsewhere, despite failing to kill Will's party, Marze and Headless completed their initial mission: retrieving a "Mage Slayer" sword. Back at the academy, the students and faculty mourn the incident's casualties, while Will's party recovers in the infirmary. Sion questions Will about Wis, but the latter cannot recall what happened. Meanwhile, Finn reports to Caldron and presents a broken Mage Slayer he looted from mages conducting experiments on the dungeon's 40th floor by Aaron's expedition team. Finn is also angered by Caldron hiding Will from him, as he is supposed to lead the "swords", but is silenced when the headmistress reveals the boy's commitment to becoming a mage despite his lack of talent. Afterward, two months pass by, and the students prepare to take their final exams.

===== Season 2 (2026) =====
No.	Title	Directed by	Written by	Storyboarded by	Original release date
13	"Barrier Day"; Transliteration: "Kyōkai no Hi" (Japanese: 境界の日)	Hiroaki Kudō	Noboru Kimura	Hideaki Nakano	April 12, 2026
Will gets perfect scores on all of his finals with one more exam remaining. That night, the Magia Vanders gather in preparation for Terminalia, an annual festival to reconstruct the barrier protecting Urbus Rigarden that takes place at the end of the school year. The next day, Edward administers the last exam that he wrote specifically to ensure that Will fails. Afterwards, Workner confronts Edward arguing that the exam was designed with a single person in mind as Will finishes his time as a student one credit short of qualifying for the tower. That night, Terminalia takes place while Will deals with depression of failing outside the academy's gates with Rosti. Will's party looks for him before Workner takes over the search. The festival takes place and at the stroke of midnight, the Magia Vanders successfully reconstruct the barrier. However, a horde of monsters called Dinoboroses are teleported into the city and begins attacking indiscriminately as Marze and Headless waited until the Magia Vanders used up their magical energy reconstructing the barrier to initiate the attack.
14	"The Party from Hell Begins"; Transliteration: "Jigoku no Kaien" (Japanese: 地獄の開宴)	Kentarō Mizuno	Noboru Kimura	Shigenori Kageyama & Mizuki Aoba	April 19, 2026
Dinoboroses ravage the city, and the mages are overwhelmed by the ones equipped with Mage Slayers that nullifies magic attacks. Meanwhile, Aaron orders the power-drained Magia Vanders stay put at the tower. Will sprints into action, saving a mother and her daughter, and attacks the equipped Dinoboroses. Aaron orders Iris to call in the dwarves to attack the equipped Dinoboroses, while Edward orders the students to fight the unequipped Dinoboroses. With Marze and Headless noticing that the mages came up with a countermeasure after analyzing the Mage Slayer, they summon their secret weapon, a Devander, a notoriously powerful monster from the 40th floor that killed several Magia Vanders in the past. Will gets overwhelmed fighting the Devander as every attack sends him flying. As the dwarves move in to fight the Devander, it powers itself by absorbing the traces from the defeated monsters. Rosti attempts to power Will's sword with his magic, but the Devander slices off his arm before he could do so. Rosti orders Kiki to relay a message to Colette, while Will engages with the Devander. With the Devander about to deliver the fatal blow, Rosti sacrifices himself to protect Will from the attack.
15	"One Single Magic Spell"; Transliteration: "Tatta Hitotsu no Mahō" (Japanese: たったひとつの魔法)	Masakazu Yoshimoto & Tsukasa Endō	Shingo Nagai	Takahiko Usui	April 26, 2026
Workner rescues Will from the Devander. At the tower, Zeo Thorzeus Reinbolt, the Thunder Faction Magia Vander, attempts to leave the tower to fight against Aaron's order, but is stopped, while Elfaria threatens him to let her protect Will. As Will is carried away by Workner, he loses his composure for failing to protect Rosti, and the two are attacked by Marze. Meanwhile, Kiki directs Colette and Sion to protect the tower, the High Mage Clairie Serah engages with the Devander that is headed for the tower, and Edward is wounded protecting a dwarf that motivates the dwarves to fight. Colette and Sion are attacked by the Devander. Will and Workner are shot down by Marze with Workner suffering a serious wound, putting Will even deeper into depression. Workner tells Will he can actually use magic, albeit a single spell. Finn arrives to tell Will that Workner will live and explains that the spell is actually his courage. Finn returns Will's sword with the limiter removed by his blood. Now able to use his sword to the fullest, Will quickly slays all the remaining Dinoboroses and saves Colette and Sion from the Devander.
16	"And the Story Begins"; Transliteration: "Soshite Hajimaru Monogatari" (Japanese: そして始まる物語)	Raita Sunaga	Shōgo Yasukawa	Rui Kurahashi & Hideaki Nakano	May 2, 2026
Sometime after Will was born, the Mage Queen Mercedes made a pact with Finn, entrusting him to develop Will into a swordsman capable of using the "fifth element" to save the world from the Celestial Hosts while Mercedes develops many wands. In the present, Will knocks the Devander back towards the gates in front of the tower entrance after protecting Sion. As Will fights the Devander, the students that used to ridicule him gather to observe the fight and shout their support for him. However, Will's sword breaks unable to cut through its immense strength. Elfaria drops a magical sword from the tower's balcony to help Will. Will absorbs the spell into his sword creating Albis Wis. He cuts away at the Devander as the Mage Slayer does not repel the "fifth element" that the Wis consists of. Headless summons more Dinoboroses, but they are all simultaneously defeated by Will using Fruzel Cardeneia. Then Will slays the Devander to end the battle. Afterwards, Finn declares that after 500 years he has fulfilled his objective of joining wand and sword, and as such Wistoria, the tale of the joining of the wand and sword, is just beginning.
17	"The Day of Departure"; Transliteration: "Tabidachi no Hi" (Japanese: 旅立ちの日)	Akihiko Sano	Noboru Kimura	Akihiko Sano	May 10, 2026
The next day, Will's memories of Wis are manipulated by Caldron in order to return to his usual self as he recalls his first meeting with Rosti three years ago. Meanwhile, Workner wakes up in the academy's infirmary after being rescued by fellow professor Eliza Nosferat. In the tower, Aaron and Iris discuss Will and how Caldron had concealed his true abilities until he fully matured. The other Magia Vanders arrive and Aaron orders them to continue investigating the attack during Terminalia. While watching the magicians and dwarves begin rebuilding Urbus Rigarden together, Finn tells Iris that he will be taking Will despite Iris telling him not to. At the graduation ceremony, Caldron announces that Will is one of the 50 graduates ascending the tower having created a new spell called Courage during the battle that saved the city to meet the second requirement. As Will leaves the auditorium, Rosti, who is revealed to be non-human, looks on and reflects on his growth.
18	"The First Bloom"; Transliteration: "Fāsuto Bulūmu [Dai ichi Hiraki-sai]" (Japanese: 第一開祭(ファースト・ブルーム))	Kentarō Mizuno	Shōgo Yasukawa	Shigenori Kageyama & Mizuki Aoba	May 17, 2026
As Will prepares to enter the tower, he recalls the time five years ago he promised Elfaria to climb the tower. After being outfitted in a white uniform called a Gloria and getting a new sword forged by Donnan, Will heads to the tower. The graduates are escorted to the tower's first floor, the Colorless Garden, by Clairie. After touring the Colorless Garden, the graduates assemble in the Pruning Ceremonial Hall where the First Bloom is conducted with the Magia Vanders and their faction representatives present. The first stage is the Blessing of Color in which the Gloria changes color depending on the faction a mage is recruited by. Will and Julius are among six graduates who were not chosen as Elfaria refuses to recruit Julius, while she expresses disinterest in Will due to her request to scout Will being denied by the Upper Institute's director, Kruetz Harlon. The next stage of the First Bloom has the unchosen graduates fight Zoctonias in order to convince a faction to choose them. While the other graduates struggle, Will and Julius collectively dispatch the Zoctonias.
19	"He Said He Would No Longer Hang His Head"; Transliteration: "Mō Shita o Mukanaito Kare wa Itta" (Japanese: もう下を向かないと彼は言った)	Hiroaki Kudō	Shingo Nagai	Yōhei Suzuki	May 24, 2026
With Will showing off his talent in defeating the Zoctonias with assistance from Julius, every faction decides to scout Will that would normally allow him to choose which faction to join. However, Kreutz overrules their decisions, pointing out that Will merely repurposed the magic others used and those unable to use a wand are unfit to join a faction. Kreutz orders a special test for Will to defeat a Wor Ooze, a creature that can only be defeated with magic. With Will prohibited from using outside magic, he struggles and fails the special test. Clairie announces that the unchosen graduates will partake in the Second Bloom in a week, which normally happens six months later, but is moved up due to the losses at Terminalia. Afterwards, Will spends all night studying magic, and Julius comes in to help Will train to manifest his own magical energy while the other unchosen graduates head for the dungeon. As training begins, Julius tells Will that he needs to learn to anchor the magic in his sword to increase the duration of Wis. Meanwhile, a witch oversees their training.
20	"Teachings of the Witch"; Transliteration: "Majo no Oshie" (Japanese: 魔女の教え)	Shinji Sano	Shingo Nagai	Shigenori Kageyama & Mizuki Aoba	May 31, 2026
Will struggles with his training, while Julius exhausts himself maintaining his clones sent out to multitask. Will points out that Julius is actually kind, which has him remembering his childhood as he was kind as a kid, but decided kindness was a liability after Anna Eils, his family's former maid who he fell in love with, married another man. Meanwhile, Kreutz orders mages from the Upper Institute to attack Will and Julius. Julius is attacked by three Upper Institute mages before Will arrives to protect him. Then the mysterious witch Cerridwen escorts the two to safety while offering to train them until the Second Bloom. In the tower, Elfaria explains her refusal to recruit Julius stems from her personal grudge. Cerridwen brings Will and Julius to Clairie's secret hideout on the first floor and explains her primary reason for helping them: protecting Will from the Upper Institute. Kreutz tells his aide Charles Lauer that he intends to dissect Will in a secret experiment to turn Wis into a mass-produced weapon that anybody can wield similar to the Mage Slayer. Will feels like he has known Cerridwen for a long time even though the two just met.
21	"The Page to Be Turned"; Transliteration: "Mekura Reru Pēji" (Japanese: めくられる頁)	Hideaki Nakano	Kōji Miura	Hideaki Nakano	June 7, 2026
Cerridwen examines Will's body and notices the big scar on his back. She sees that while Will can store magical energy, he cannot expel it himself. Cerridwen sends Will's consciousness to the past to learn how to use his stored energy at will using Twarv Historia on that scar. Will wakes up ten years in the past when Elfaria dragged him to a dangerous forest behind the orphanage to defeat a monster. While Will remembers going into the forest and getting his scar on his back from protecting Elfaria, he has no recollection of what happened after entering the forest. In the forest, Will and Elfaria fought a monster he now knows was mage-created. Will was badly wounded when the monster reflected Elfaria's magic. Afterwards, his determination to protect Elfaria awakened his Wis, creating a sword from his stored magical energy to defeat the monster. Having fully grasped the nature of his magic, Will awakens having been asleep for six days and immediately heads out with Julius to partake in the Second Bloom.
22	"Hoping, Blooming, Thundering"; Transliteration: "Omoi, Hanahiraki, Todoroku" (Japanese: 想い, 花開き, 轟く)	Jia Zihao	Kōji Miura	Yoshiyuki Ukai	June 14, 2026
On the night before the Second Bloom, Colette, Sion, Lihanna, and Wignall snuck out of the tower to meet Workner, who tells them to have faith in Will. As Will and Julius make their way to the Second Bloom, the remaining graduates are recruited. Will takes the same special test again from Kreutz with Elfaria recruiting Julius to her faction immediately after the test begins. Drawing from his memories, Will successfully charges his sword with his own magical energy to defeat the War Oozes. Finn drops in, revealing that Cerridwen is Caldron, who had been using aging magic to appear old. Frustrated at Will's success, Kreutz tries again to dissuade the factions from recruiting him. In response, Zeo tests Will by having him withstand a hit from him, and Will absorbs the bulk of the attack to recharge his sword, while minimizing the damage to survive the attack. Kreutz reluctantly concedes and allows Will to join a faction after Zeo threatens to hit him with the same attack. Elfaria reunites with Will knowing that he intends to join her faction. However, Zeo decides to recruit Will into the Lightning Faction by force much to Elfaria's disdain.
23	"A Roar of Ice and Lightning"; Transliteration: "Hyōrai Hōkō" (Japanese: 氷雷咆哮)	Takahiko Usui	Shingo Nagai	Takahiko Usui	June 21, 2026
The two Magia Vander in the stands recall past interactions with Zeo, before focusing on the present argument between him and Elfaria. The two agree to settle their dispute through combat: the winner gets Will for their faction. Elfaria fights using her ice clones to unleash a constant barrage of increasingly powerful ice spells, but Zeo is unfazed thanks to unique application of lightning magic. Despite casting multiple, complex spells in rapid succession, Elfaria is overwhelmed by Zeo's speed, close-quarters fighting style, and sharp instincts. Taking several blows, Elfaria is cornered, but gets reinvigorated when she hears an unconscious Will say her name. Declaring her love for Will as her reason for fighting, Elfaria turns the tables with a trap spell she prepared in secret, freezing Zeo in place and successfully landing a hit. Zeo retaliates by performing a proper incantation for the first time. Elfaria does the same, and the two continue to clash while performing the unusually long incantations of Prime Magic. The Prime Magic spells produce powerful elemental summons, forcing the Elf Faction to wrap the arena in a barrier to shield the spectators. The two summons collide, and the battlefield is engulfed in a blinding explosion.
24	"A Story of a Dream with No End"; Transliteration: "Owaranai Yume" (Japanese: 終わらない物語)	Kentarō Mizuno	Shōgo Yasukawa	Shigenori Kageyama & Mizuki Aoba	June 28, 2026

== Reception ==
The series was nominated for the seventh Next Manga Awards in 2021 in the print category.
