= List of Is It Wrong to Try to Pick Up Girls in a Dungeon? characters =

The light novel, manga, and anime series Is It Wrong to Try to Pick Up Girls in a Dungeon?, also known as DanMachi, has a cast of characters created by author Fujino Ōmori and illustrator Suzuhito Yasuda. The story takes place in the fictional city of Orario whose people join groups called Familia (ファミリア, Famiria), who serve a range of functions from dungeon crawling to crafting items. Each Familia is named after and serves a resident deity. In addition, there are monsters who live in the dungeons that sometimes serve as antagonists in the series.

== Main characters ==
=== Bell Cranel ===
Voiced by: Yoshitsugu Matsuoka (Japanese); Bryson Baugus (English)
Bell Cranel (ベル・クラネル, Beru Kuraneru; Anime: Bell Cranel) is a novice solo adventurer and member of the Hestia Familia.^{[ch. 1]} The light novel chapter sections often alternate between his narrative and a third-person perspective.^{[LN 2]} He has white hair and red eyes and his weapon is a pair of daggers. Bell is the sole owner of the rare skill called Liaris Freese (憧憬一途(リアリス・フレーゼ), Riarisu Furēze) which accelerates his growth and development based on the strength and stability of his feelings, but also drawing the interest of those who are curious about the secret behind it, as he quickly grew from level 1 to level 2,^{[ch. 1]}^{[LN 1]} and later to level 3, then level 4 in the span of only a few months.^{[LN 6]} When he reached level 2, he gained another skill: Argonaut. This skill allows him to greatly empower his attacks on critical situations, born from his desire to become a hero.^{[LN 4]} He aspires to become as strong as Ais whom he is in love with, because he doesn't feel he is worthy to confess his feelings to her until he does so. This leads him to instinctively run away whenever he encounters her,^{[ch. 2]} until they become friends. His dream is to become a hero just like in the stories he listened from his grandfather, who is later revealed to be the god Zeus himself.^{[LN 1]}. He has won the interest of other girls, most of whom he hasn't realized what they feel for him, but does not reciprocate the feelings of that confessed, and only considers Ais as his true mate.
He is the primary wielder of the Hestia Knife (value 200,000,000 valis). This weapon is a living weapon made by Hephaestus as a favor to Hestia to help Bell grow and will grow more powerful as he does. In the hands of anyone not of the Familia the knife is useless, but Mikoto was able to locate it using her skill since she is part of the familia and able to use it escaping the Ishtar compound.
His nickname is Little Rookie (未完の少年(リトル・ルーキー), Ritoru Rūkī), though some also call him the vorpal rabbit (in reference to an exceptionally lethal creature in the lower 30's of the Dungeon that while small and fast, can take out even the toughest adventurers). As of his level 4 ascension, his alias was changed to Rabbit Foot (白兎の脚(ラビット・フット), Rabitto Futto). He reached level 5 just prior to the War Game against the Freya Familia and his current alias is Regulus Arne.

=== Hestia ===
Voiced by: Inori Minase (Japanese); Luci Christian (English)
Hestia (ヘスティア, Hesutia) is Bell's resident deity, in charge of taking care of Bell's development as an adventurer. She is jealous of Bell's involvement with other girls' affairs, including Ais's, but is still in love with him, devoted to protecting him, and helping with his growth, even after learning that he only views her as family.^{[LN 5]} She and Bell live in a room under an abandoned church, and she works part-time for the Guild as a clerk, and also at some food stands to help Bell with day-to-day living expenses,^{[LN 1]} until moving to the former palace of the Apollon Familia upon defeating them in the War Game and claiming their assets. Wary about what could happen should the existence of Bell's special trait be revealed to the world, she keeps it a secret from everyone else, including Bell, until sharing it with the other members of her Familia upon being asked about it.^{[LN 7]}

=== Ais Wallenstein ===
Voiced by: Saori Ōnishi (Japanese); Shelley Calene-Black (English)
Ais Wallenstein (アイズ・ヴァレンシュタイン, Aizu Varenshutain) is a beautiful and powerful swordswoman of the Loki Familia.^{[ch. 1]} Aliased the Sword Princess (剣姫, Kenki), she is a level 5 adventurer who has killed over a thousand monsters and has turned down just as many suitors.^{[ch. 2]} As a child, she lost her parents to the Black Dragon and resolves to get stronger, joining the familia and started adventuring at the age of 7. She finally achieved Lvl 6 after defeating floor 37's boss Monster Rex alone making her the 4th Lvl 6 adventurer in Loki's Familia alongside Finn, Riveria and Gareth. She has blond hair and golden eyes. Bell first meets her in the Dungeon when she saves him from a Minotaur that escaped from her group and fled to the upper levels.^{[ch. 1]} Although she generally shows a quiet, emotionless personality,^{[ch. 2]} she knows of Bell and has defended him from her peers, who joke about his ineptitude during the Minotaur incident.^{[vol. 1]} After properly having a conversation with Bell, Ais appears to have developed an interest for him, helping with his training, but curious about how quickly he develops. She can use wind magic to allow her to do 3 dimensional fighting. Ais is the main character of the sidestory series Sword Oratoria which focuses on her adventures with the Loki Famillia, including a little bit of her history, while also showing events from the main series through her own point of view.^{[LN 1]}

=== Ryū Lion ===
Voiced by: Saori Hayami (Japanese); Genevieve Simmons (English)
Ryū Lion (リュー・リオン, Ryū Rion) is an elf waitress at the Hostess of Fertility and Syr's friend, who supports her with her crush on Bell, occasionally helping him and the Hestia Familia for her sake, later becoming a regular member. Nicknamed the Gale Wind (疾風, Shippū), she was a level 4 adventurer from the Astraea Familia, until her Familia was slaughtered by the monstrous Juggernaut during a confrontation with the Rudra Familia in the dungeon and all of the members, except for Ryū, were killed. Ryū avenged her late comrades by destroying the rival Famila using any means she could, including traps and assassinations, though as a result of her actions she was blacklisted by the guild and excommunicated from Astraea, unabling her to level up (though she ended Evilus' dark reign on Orario at the time). Despite this, Syr and Mia took her in. As the Gale Wind, she seemed to be compared multiple times with Ais due to their similarities in sword fighting and usage of wind magic, and is still feared in Orario to the point she once had a bounty of 80 million valis placed by the guild. She starts developing feelings for Bell after their survival journey together on the 37th floor while facing the Juggernaut once again. Later, prior to the Freya Famillia's war game, she became the first person in Orario history to achieve double rank up from Level 4 to 6 after her visit to Astraea to update her falna, presumably due to her gathered experience during the last five years. Ryū is the main character of her own sidestory series Familia Chronicle Episode Ryū and Astrea Record which provides more details about her past and other adventures with the Astrea Famillia and the Hostess of Fertility.

=== Lefiya Viridis ===
Voiced by: Juri Kimura (Japanese); Kelley Peters (English)
Lefiya Viridis (レフィーヤ・ウィリディス, Refīya Uiridisu) is an elven level 3 mage who has a crush on Ais and, despite her high potential, usually panics while facing strong enemies but gradually grew out of it with the help of Riveria. She gets jealous of the time Ais spends with Bell, though her opinion on Bell has changed through their interactions. With this, she becomes Bell's self proclaimed rival. She later eventually reaches Level 4. She has a small role in the main series but acts as Ais' closest friend and co-protagonist in Sword Oratoria.

== Familias ==
=== Hestia Familia ===
Originally comprising only Hestia and Bell, the Hestia Familia eventually expands to include the following characters, as well as Ryū. Originally established in an abandoned church, it later moves to a huge estate they win in a bet with the Apollon Familia, renaming it as the Hearth Mansion (竈火の館, Kamado no Yakata)

==== Liliruca Arde ====
Voiced by: Maaya Uchida (Japanese); Hilary Haag (English)
Lililuka Arde (リリルカ・アーデ, Ririruka Āde; Anime: Liliruca Arde), or "Lilly" for short, also referred to as Li'l E by Welf, is a supporter: a porter who accompanies adventurers to transport loot and supplies. Originally a member of the Soma Familia, she introduces herself to Bell as a "chienthrope" (dog person), complete with animal ears.^{[LN 2]}^{[ep 4]} She is very short but carries a backpack about three times her size.^{[LN 2]} Lilly convinces Bell into pairing up with her intending to steal his knife, unaware that it only shows its true power in Bell's hands.^{[LN 2]} Before meeting Bell, she hated all adventurers because her parents died when the adventurers they were with abandoned them. As a result, she cheated them out of money and items in order to live. However her dislike for Bell changes when he saves her from a Killer Ant colony and the two then become official partners. Eventually Lilly falls in love with Bell and competes with Hestia for his attention, later severing all ties with the Soma Familia and joining the Hestia Familia.^{[LN 7]}

==== Welf Crozzo ====
Voiced by: Yoshimasa Hosoya (Japanese); David Wald (English)
Welf Crozzo (ヴェルフ・クロッゾ, Verufu Kurozzo) is a 17-year-old smith from the "fallen noble" Crozzo family. He stopped creating magic items because he hates people who just want to be strong and famous and view weapons as mere tools. Despite this, his magic smithing skills are coveted by the members of his family who, unlike him, were cursed due to the devastation caused by Rakia. Originally a member of Hephaistos' Familia, he does not get along with the other members of the familia, except for Hephaistos herself, whom he is in love with.^{[LN 8]} He created the "Pyonkina Rabbit Light armour MK-II^{[LN 2 p. 81]} that Bell used once. Impressed with Bell's work, Welf becomes his friend and partner, accompanying Bell on trips into the dungeon. He later becomes Bell's personal armourer and joins the Hestia Familia as well.^{[LN 7]} He treats Bell like a younger brother.

==== Mikoto Yamato ====
Voiced by: Chinatsu Akasaki (Japanese); Margaret Lewis (English)
Mikoto Yamato (ヤマト・命, Yamato Mikoto) was originally a member of the Takemikazuchi Familia who later transfers to the Hestia Familia to assist them in foiling the Apollon Familia's plot to bring down Hestia. She is also Haruhime's childhood friend.^{[LN 7]}

==== Haruhime Sanjōno ====
Voiced by: Haruka Chisuga (Japanese); Allison Sumrall (English)
Haruhime Sanjōno (サンジョウノ・春姫, Sanjōno Haruhime) is a Renart, a demi-human with fox traits. Originally a member of the Ishtar Familia and trained as a prostitute, she is rescued by Bell and Mikoto when the Ishtar Familia is destroyed by the Freya Familia. She finds shelter with Hestia and the others and has worked as a maid for them since then.^{[LN 8]}

=== Loki Familia ===
Loki (ロキ, Roki)
Voiced by: Yurika Kubo (Japanese); Christina Kelly (English)
The goddess of mischief and head of one of the largest familias.^{[ch. 4]} A shameless flirt, Ais is her favorite child and Loki is jealous of anyone who gets too close to her. She has been called Loki "No-bits" as despite her looks, she is very flat-chested and is jealous of Hestia's curvaceous body, sparkling a rivalry between them.^{[ch. 4,5]} She speaks in Kansai dialect.
Finn Deimne (フィン・ディムナ, Finn Dimuna)
Voiced by: Mutsumi Tamura (Japanese); Shannon Emerick (English)
Head of the Loki Familia, he is a Level 6 Pallum adventurer who is over 40 years old despite looking like a young boy. He once takes a liking to Lilly and asks for her hand in marriage, but is rejected.^{[LN 7]}
Bete Loga (ベート・ローガ, Bēto Rōga)
Voiced by: Nobuhiko Okamoto (Japanese); Ty Mahany (English)
A beastman of the familia, he considers low-level adventurers trash and treats them as such.^{[ch. 2]} He considers himself the only one (besides Loki) worthy of Ais' favor. He initially takes pleasure in insulting Bell^{[ch. 2]}, but later gains respect for him when he continues to level up.
Riveria Ljos Alf (リヴェリア・リヨス・アールヴ, Rivueria Riyosu Aruvu)
Voiced by: Risa Taneda (Season 1), Ayako Kawasumi (Sword Oratoria, Season 2-present) (Japanese); Melissa Pritchett (English)
A high elf sorceress and considered the strongest magic user in the city. While she appears aloof and cold she actually cares for her friend Ais, considering her almost like a daughter. She has an interest in watching over Bell and his influence on Ais.
Gareth Landrock (ガレス・ランドロック, Garesu Randorokku)
Voiced by: Kenji Nomura (Japanese); Chris Ayres, Mark X. Laskowski (Sword Oratoria) (English)
A Level 6 Dwarf who's an executive.
Tione Hiryute (ティオネ・ヒリュテ)
Voiced by: Minami Takahashi (Japanese); Natalie Rial (English)
A Level 6 Amazon and Tiona's sister, she is well endowed and has a crush on Finn.
Tiona Hiryute (ティオナ・ヒリュテ)
Voiced by: Rie Murakawa (Japanese); Karlii Hoch (English)
A Level 6 Amazon and Tione's sister, she is usually mocked by her sister because of her small breasts.

=== Freya Familia ===
Freya (フレイヤ, Fureiya)
Voiced by: Yōko Hikasa (Japanese); Patricia Duran (English)
The main antagonist of the first half of the series, she is the Goddess of Beauty who currently heads the strongest familia in Orario.^{[ch. 4]} She senses Bell's great potential and schemes to make him hers, and actively does anything in her power to see him grow as an adventurer ^{[vol. 1]}. She doesn't like to be bound by anyone, though she doesn't wish to become an arrogant ruler either. However, as her love for Bell grew too obsessive (followed by his rejection in her Syr persona), she eventually decided to let her selfishness take over and attacked his Familia, kidnapped him, and charmed all of Orario so she could have him unimpeded. After she lost to the Hestia Familia in the Great Faction War, her familia was disbanded and she was banished from Orario, although she remained in town discreetly in her Syr Flova identity. She's also the main character in her own sidestory series Famillia Chronicle Episode Freya.

- Syr Flover (シル・フローヴァ, Shiru Furōvua)

Voiced by: Shizuka Ishigami (Japanese); Juliet Simmons (English)
Freya's alter ego where she works as a waitress at the Hostess of Fertility in order to "role-play" and experience an ordinary life as a human. She first embraced her role through using Hörn's name and appearance though in exchange she becomes her double during her time as a waitress. In her Syr persona, she grew closer to Bell through various interactions with him in the fertility while making lunch boxes for him, and in some cases, leaves him artifacts that gets him to grow as an adventurer (such as a grimoire that enabled Bell to learn firebolt and a "good luck charm" during his war game against the Apollo Famillia).^{[vol. 1]}

Ottar (オッタル, Ottaru)
Voiced by: Ryoukan Koyanagi (Japanese); John Gremillion (English)
The captain of the Freya Familia and her right-hand man. He is also currently the highest ranked adventurer in Orario, being the only one so far to have reached level 7 following his duel victory against Zald, who was the also formerly the highest ranking adventurer at the time.^{[LN 7]}
Allen Fromel (アレン・フローメル, Aren Furōmeru)
Voiced by: Taku Yashiro (Japanese); Joe Daniels (English)
Nicknamed Vana Freya, he is the vice captain of the Freya Famillia who is a spear wielding level 6 cat people and loves to pick on the weak.
Hogni Ragnar (ヘグニ・ラグナール, Heguni Ragunāru)
Voiced by: Yūsuke Kobayashi (Japanese); Kyle Colby Jones (English)
An executive of the Freya Famillia who is a level 6 and the former the king of the Dark Elves on the Hyazning island.
Hedin Selland (ヘディン・セルランド, Hedin Serurando)
Voiced by: Nobunaga Shimazaki (Japanese); Antonio Lasanta (English)
An executive of the Freya Famillia who is a level 6 and the former the king of the White Elves on the Hyazning island.
Gulliver Brothers (ガリバー兄弟, Garibā kyōdai)
Voiced by: Taichi Ichikawa (Japanese); James Marler (English)
Hörn (ヘルン, Herun)
Voiced by: Haruka Shiraishi (Japanese); Molly Searcy (English)
A member of the Freya Famillia and the original Syr. Initially an orphan she met Freya, who told her that she would save her and asked her if she had a wish. When she wishes to be like her, Freya offered her a deal. In exchange for giving Freya her name, she received the name "Horn" and a magic that allowed her to become Freya, acting as her double every time she left under the identity of Syr.
Heith Velvet (ヘイズ・ヴェルヴェット, Heizu Veruvetto)
Voiced by: Ikumi Hasegawa (Japanese); Amanda Martinez (English)
The level 4 medic of the Freya Famillia who is known to be the best healer in Orario.

=== Hephaistos Familia ===
Hephaistos (ヘファイストス, Hefaisutosu; alt. "Hephaestus")
Voiced by: Yuka Terasaki (Japanese); Stephanie Wittels (English)
The Lord of the Forge.^{[ch. 4]} Her family is the largest arms and armor producer in the city.^{[vol. 1]} She is Hestia's friend and, despite knowing that Hestia has nothing to offer for her services, she creates a special weapon for Bell, but demands compensation on a later occasion. She wears a patch covering her scarred right eye and, upon learning that Welf does not care about it, she falls in love with him.
Tsubaki Collbrande ((椿・コルブランド, Tsubaki Koruburando)
Voiced by: Hitomi Nabatame
The level 5 captain of the Hephaistos Familia as well as a master smith. She assisted the Loki Familia on their expedition to the 59th floor and the Hestia Familia on their search to rescue Bell and Ryu.

=== Miach Familia ===
Miach (ミアハ, Miaha)
Voiced by: Makoto Furukawa (Japanese); Mike Yager (English)
Resident deity of the Miach Familia, well known for the healing potions and other herbal remedies that many adventurers and citizens use on a daily basis. He is a good friend of Hestia's.^{[vol. 1]}
Naaza Erisuis (ナァーザ・エリスイス, Nāza Erisuisu)
Voiced by: Ikumi Hayama (Japanese); Natalie Jones (English)
Miach's assistant and first follower. She runs the potion shop when he is out and she loves to tease Bell when he comes in to purchase items.
Cassandra Illion (カサンドラ・イリオン, Kasandora Irion)
Voiced by: Ayumi Mano (Japanese); Alicia Beard (English)
A girl who has visions of the future, but no one gives attention to her warnings, except for Bell, thus she ends up growing fond of him. She was originally part of the Apollon Familia before it was destroyed in the War Game against the Hestia Familia.
Daphne Lauros (ダフネ・ラウロス, Dafune Raurosu)
Voiced by: Wakana Kowaka (Japanese); Ellisa Cuellar (English)
Another former member of the Apollon Familia. She cares for Cassandra although she doesn't believe her visions and dismisses them as dreams.

=== Takemikazuchi Familia ===
Takemikazuchi (タケミカヅチ)
Voiced by: Junji Majima (Japanese); Adam Gibbs (English)
Chigusa Hitachi (ヒタチ・千草, Hitachi Chigusa)
Voiced by: Yuka Iguchi (Japanese); Kara Greenberg (English)
Ōka Kashima (カシマ・桜花, Kashima Ōka)
Voiced by: Kazuyuki Okitsu (Japanese); Jack Ivy (English)

=== Hermes Familia ===
Hermes (ヘルメス, Herumesu)
Voiced by: Sōma Saitō (Japanese); Benjamin McLaughlin (English)
The Messenger God. His familia is known to be a jack-of-trades group doing messenger services, special deliveries, etc. While mostly neutral in the affairs of the other gods, he is known to butt into events if it entertains him, despite the punishments he would receive later. Despite that, he has two missions he takes seriously, which are to watch Bell's development, and to look for the next Hero who will lead the humans against the Third Task—The Black Dragon—eventually choosing Bell for the task.
Asfi Al Andromeda (アスフィ・アル・アンドロメダ, Asufi Aru Andoromeda)
Voiced by: Ai Kayano (Japanese); Serena Varghese (English)
Asfi is Hermes' second in command and the level 4 captain of the Hermes Familia who is usually distressed with his antics.
Aisha Belka (アイシャ・ベルカ, Aisha Beruka)
Voiced by: Akeno Watanabe (Japanese); Joanne Bonasso (English)
A friend of Haruhime and former member of the Ishtar Familia.

=== Ganesha Familia ===
Ganesha (ガネーシャ, Ganēsha)
Voiced by: Hiroshi Tsuchida^{[ep 2]} (Japanese); John Swasey (English)
Wearing an elephant mask to the god of the same name, he is the head of the Ganesha Familia and the unofficial head of the city.^{[ch. 4]} He and his Familia organizes many of the city's festivals and events like "Monsterphilia" and provides the creatures for the thrill of the crowds.^{[vol. 1]}
Shakti Varma (シャクティ・ヴァルマ, Shakuti Varuma)
Voiced by: Yo Taichi
The level 5 Captain of the Ganesha Familia, who's also the head of security in every events that the Familia organized.

=== Apollon Familia ===
Apollon (アポロン, Aporon)
Voiced by: Ryōta Ōsaka (Japanese); Blake Jackson (English)
A flirtatious god with several male and female lovers, Apollon leads the Apollon Familia. He tried several times to seduce Hestia to no avail during their stay in Heaven, and upon learning of Bell's feats takes an interest in him as well. He joins forces with the Soma Familia against Bell and Hestia in a plan to bring them down and claim possession over Bell. That plan backfires when Hestia takes the opportunity to disband the Apollon Familia and claim all of his wealth (including his mansion).^{[LN 7]}
Hyakinthos Clio (ヒュアキントス・クリオ, Hyuakintosu Kurio)
Voiced by: KENN (Japanese); Joe Daniels (English)
One of Apollo's most powerful warriors, he is very jealous of him and loathes Bell for catching his attention, despite unwillingly.

=== Ishtar Familia ===
Ishtar (イシュタル, Ishutaru)
Voiced by: Takako Honda (Japanese); Courtney Lomelo (English)
The leader of the Ishtar Familia, able to charm both Gods and children with her beauty. Her familia's main business in Orario is prostitution. She has a rivalry with Freya, and upon learning of her interest in Bell, she orders her followers to kidnap him in order to seduce him. However, this end up bringing her Freya's anger, as she uses the incident to destroy Ishtar and her Familia.
Phryne Jameel (フリュネ・ジャミール, Furyune Jamīru)
Voiced by: Kimiko Saitō (Japanese); Vicki Barosh (English)
The level 5 captain of the Ishtar Familia, she is a huge woman with a frog like face that fancies herself as more beautiful than the goddesses themselves. Her whereabouts are unknown after the Ishtar Familia was disbanded.

=== Astraea Familia ===
Astraea (アストレア, Asutorea)
Voiced by: Mai Nakahara
The goddess of justice and head of the Astraea Familia, she is a kind and caring leader while carrying a peaceful expression and never acts aggressive. Her familia was one of the strongest in Orario, until it fell apart when all of its members were killed (except Ryū who was the sole survivor) by the monstrous Juggernaut when it was unintentionally summoned by the excessive damage caused to the dungeon during their expedition, and after excommunicating with Ryu, she left Orario. Currently her Familia seems to have started over again outside Orario, starting with Cecil as a new member.
Alise Lovell (アリーゼ・ローヴェル, Arīze Rōveru)
Voiced by: Yumiri Hanamori
The former captain of the Astraea Familia, Alise was a level 4 adventurer who took Ryu into the Astrea familia when she started to be an adventurer. She became close friends with Ryuu, as she inspired her hope for the Familia, as she wants to find the true meaning of justice from a young age. She died alongside other members of the familia during the assault by the monstrous Juggernaut prior to the story, though at the end she still believes in Ryu as she would make the right decisions for their sake. After Ryu starts to develop feelings for Bell, Alise's spirit seems to call out to her to "never let him go", implying she fully supports her relationship with Bell as the right person for her.
Gojouno Kaguya (ゴジョウノ・輝夜, Gojōno Kaguya)
Voiced by: Sayaka Senbongi
The former vice captain of the Astraea Familia, she was one of the strongest in the familia alongside Ryū and Alise. She also died alongside other members of the familia during the assault by the monstrous Juggernaut prior to the story.
Lyra (ライラ, Raira)
Voiced by: Ayaka Suwa
The former member of the Astraea Familia, she was the smartest among the familia with her cunning skills. She also died alongside other members of the familia during the assault by the monstrous Juggernaut prior to the story.

=== Ikelos Familia ===
Ikelos (イケロス, Ikerosu)
Voiced by: Jun Fukushima (Japanese); Tyler Galindo (English)
Leader of Ikelos Familia, he gave power to Dix and the rest of his followers just out of enjoyment and rejoices of all the trouble they cause. After the familia is disbanded, Ikelos is exiled from Orario.
Dix Perdix (ディックス・ペルディクス, Dikkusu Perudikusu)
Voiced by: Daisuke Namikawa (Japanese); Kyle Colby Jones (English)
Captain of the Ikelos Familia, he is a descendant of Daedalus, an architect who participated on the construction of Orario. Like all of Daedalus' descendants, he was born with a curse that makes him continue his work on Knossos, a labyrinth conceived by Daedalus to rival the dungeon in grandiosity. To finance his operations, he and his companions capture monsters from the dungeon to sell them on the black market, but become the target of the Hestia Familia once they attempt to poach on the Xenos. He is killed by Asterius.

=== Dionysus Familia ===
Dionysus (ディオニュソス, Dionyusosu)
Voiced by: Matsukaze Masaya
The head of the Dionysus Familia, he leads an exploration type Familia.
Filvis Challia (フィルヴィス・シャリア, Firuvisu Sharia)
Voiced by: Hisako Kanemoto
The captain of the Dionysus Famillia, who seemed to have problems with communicating with others.
Revis (レヴィス, Revisu)
Voiced by: Sayaka Oohara
A creature who takes a form of a human woman who worked under Dionysus as Enyo.

== Other groups ==
=== Guild ===
Uranus (ウラノス, Uranosu)
Voiced by: Tōru Ōkawa (Japanese); Marty Fleck (English)
The first Deity to give his blessing to the children of the world in order to help keep the Dungeon's monsters at bay. While the actual head of the Guild and Orario, he has taken a stance of no interference and instead watches over the Dungeon ensuring the safety of the city.
Eina Tulle (エイナ・チュール, Eina Chūru)
Voiced by: Haruka Tomatsu (Japanese); Shelby Blocker (English)
A half-elf girl who works as a receptionist for the Guild.^{[ch. 1]} She cares for Bell like an older sister, although it was shown that she had feelings for him.
Misha Flott (ミィシャ・フロット, Myisha Furotto)
Voiced by: Chinami Hashimoto (Japanese); Kelley Peters (English)
Eina's co-worker who suggests Eina has feelings for Bell.^{[ch. 2]}
Fels (フェルズ, Feruzu)
Voiced by: Mikako Komatsu (Japanese); David Matranga (English)
Known as the Sage, Fels is the go between Uranus and the Xenos who discovered the Xenos and brought it to the attention of Uranus and also Bell and the Hestia Familia. Little is known about Fels' origins or gender, but they can wield powerful rare magic that rends them immortal and able to revive the dead, among other miracles, but at the cost of their humanity.

=== Hostess of Fertility ===
The Hostess of Fertility (豊饒の女主人, Hōjō no Onnashujin) is a pub that is frequented by Bell's peers. Its entire staff is female and very experienced in combat.^{[vol. 1]}

Mia Grand (ミア・グランド, Mia Gurando)
Voiced by: Yuka Keicho (Japanese); Brenda Valdivia (English)
A tall dwarf female who made her fortune in the Dungeon and retired to open up the pub called the Hostess of Fertility. A long time before the arrival of Bell in Orario she was a high-ranked adventurer (level 6)and captain of the Freya Familia. She hires women to work for her regardless of their circumstances. Her nickname is Mama (母ちゃん, Kaa-chan).^{[ch. 2]}
Anya Fromel (アーニャ・フローメル, Ānya Furōmeru)
Voiced by: Asuka Nishi (Japanese); Carolyn Medrano (English)
A waitress of the Hostess of Fertility. She is often clumsy and acts like an airhead. Also a level 4 adventurer. It is later revealed that she originated from the Freya Familia, and is Allan's little sister. For unknown reasons, she cut ties with him and the Famillia.
Chloe Rollo (クロエ・ロロ, Kuroe Roro)
Voiced by: Aya Suzaki (Japanese); Kelly Manison (English)
A waitress of the Hostess of Fertility. A cat girl who was originally an assassin known as the "Black Cat."
Lunoire Faust (ルノア・ファウスト, Runoa Fausuto)
Voiced by: Yuna Yoshino (Japanese); Kara Greenberg (English)
A waitress of the Hostess of Fertility. She was originally a bounty hunter known by her nickname, the "Black Fist."

=== Rakia ===
The Kingdom of Rakia is a belligerent, nationwide Familia led by Ares that had attempted to invade Orario several times in the past with no success. Their trump card used to be the power of Crozzo Family's magic weapons until they burned down several Elf forests which angered the Spirits, who destroyed their weapons and made them unable to make more, leading to a decline in their power. In addition, their military is composed almost entirely by regular soldiers, which can be easily defeated in combat by the Orario's adventurers, as they are empowered by their gods' blessing.^{[LN 8]}

Ares (アレス, Aresu)
Voiced by: Chikahiro Kobayashi (Japanese); Scott Gibbs (English)
The God of Rakia who usually leads his nation to war against its neighbors.^{[LN 8]}
Martinus Rakia (マルティヌス・ラキア, Marutinusu Rakia)
The king of Rakia and Marius' father.^{[LN 8]}
Marius Victorix Rakia (マリウス・ウィクトリクス・ラキア, Mariusu Uikutorisu Rakia)
Voiced by: Takuma Terashima (Japanese); Cameron Bautsch (English)
The prince of Rakia who dislikes his father's blind loyalty towards Ares and dreams of being an adventurer in Orario.^{[LN 8]}
Garon Crozzo (ガロン・クロッゾ, Garon Kurozzo)
Welf's grandfather.^{[LN 8]}
Vil Crozzo (ヴィル・クロッゾ, Viru Kurozzo)
Welf's father.^{[LN 8]}

=== Notable monsters ===
Creatures that normally reside in the Orario Dungeon, though weaker varieties exist outside it, considered enemies of humanity long before the deities arrived. Monsters are birthed from dungeon's walls and ceilings, respawn after being killed. Certain floors contain a floor boss, also known as a Monster Rex, that have a longer spawning rate after being killed.

Minotaur (ミノタウロス, Minotaurosu)
Strong monsters native to the 15th floor of the Orario Dungeon, extremely aggressive and intelligent enough to wield weapons to use large stone blades to battle. During the Loki Familia's expedition, one Minotaur escaped to the upper floors that led to the meeting of Bell and Ais. Ottar, acting on Freya's orders, recruits another minotaur which he trains in using a greatsword before letting the monster loose on the 9th floor. Bell kills the sword-wielding minotaur, who later reincarnates into the Xenos Asterius.
Udaeus (ウダイオス, Udaeusu)
A floor boss of level 37 that appears like a flaming Skeleton, spawning every three weeks. Ais defeats one single-handed to upgrade to level 6. Another spawn later gets consumed by the Juggernaut in order to use its abilities to overwhelm Bell and Ryu in their fight.
Goliath (ゴライアス, Goraiasu)
A floor boss that spawns every 2 weeks in the room just before the entrance to level 18 (better known as the Adventurers Rest). Bell and the others just get past it as it spawns.
Black Goliath (漆黒のゴライアス, Shikkoku no Goraiasu)
A rare version of Goliath that appears in the 18th floor when the Dungeon detected Hestia's presence within it after she used her powers to protect Bell, turning the safe zone into a warzone as it rallied the residing monsters to attack everyone. Capable of quickly regenerating itself even with most of its body destroyed, the Goliath is destroyed by a combined effort of all the adventurers in the floor and a magic sword used by Welf Crozzo to open a way for Bell to destroy the crystal that gives life to it.
Antares (アンタレス)
A monster sealed in the Elsos Ruins by the Great Spirits during the Ancient Times. It is a giant one-eyed, six armed, and multi-legged monster with glowing red marks across its body. It tried to destroy Orario by abducting the goddess Artemis and using her powers, but was killed by Bell and the others using the Orion spear.
Juggernaut (ジャガーノート, Jagānōto)
A monster with tremendous strength and speed with razor-sharp claws and armor that can reflect magic. Unlike other monsters, the Juggernaut spawns as a part of the dungeon's defense mechanism every time excessive damage is done to the dungeon itself. It was also responsible for the destruction of both the Astraea and the Rudra Famillia.

==== Xenos ====
Xenos (異端児(ゼノス), Zenosu) are a group of monsters with human intelligence that reside in Hidden Villages produced by the Dungeon, wanting to live in peace on the surface. To defend themselves against regular monsters and Adventurers, a Xenos eats the magic stones of defeated monsters to increase their strength. Their existence is only known by Uranus, Hermes, Ganesha, and Hestia.^{[LN 9]}

Wiene (ウィーネ, Wīne)
Voiced by: Rina Hidaka (Japanese); Cat Thomas (English)
A vouivre girl (a member of the Dragon Family) that Bell meets in the Dungeon while on a Firebird hunt, with Bell protecting her from monsters and other adventurers until circumstances force them to part.
Marie (マリィ, Marii)
Voiced by: Fukuzumi Saya (Japanese); Teresa Zimmerman (English)
A mermaid Bell encountered in the 25th floor, she acts as a guide on the floor while sometimes acting as a medical support for Bell, as her blood can heal any wounds, as proven by reattaching Bell's arm during his fight with the Juggernaut.
Lido (リド, Rido)
Voiced by: Mizunaka Masaaki (Japanese); Joe Daniels (English)
An advanced Lizardman. The second in command of the tribe, he tests Bell and his friends to determine if they are worthy of their secret. He was the leader until a new member beat him in a challenge fight then went off to train in the deep Dungeon.
Rei (レイ, Rei)
Voiced by: Yuki Takada (Japanese); Mai Le (English)
A siren. She is the second monster Bell meets and wishes to see the sun and fly under the sky.
Gros (グロス, Gurosu)
Voiced by: Tetsu Inada (Japanese); Michael Wronski (English)
A gargoyle who is wary of Bell and his friends, despite their intentions to befriend the Xenos.
Asterius (アステリオス, Asuteriusu)
Voiced by: Ryou Sugisaki (Japanese); Ricardo Contreras (English)
A Black Rhinos with a love for combat, considered as the strongest of the Xenos. He was formerly a regular minotaur that Ottar trained as part of Freya's scheme to test Bell's worth, receiving a greatsword while the ordeal reddened his fur and toughened his hide with one of his horns cut off. The minotaur roamed the 9th floor until he was killed by Bell and reincarnated into his current form, with Asterius retaining enough memories of his past life to consider Bell a worthy opponent.

== Others ==
=== Deities ===
Demeter (デメテル, Demeteru)
Voiced by: Harumi Sakurai (Japanese); Kelly Manison (English)
The Goddess of the Harvest. Considered one of the largest families due to owning most of the farms surrounding Orario. Her family keeps the city supplied with most of its food. Also the owner of the largest chest of all the Goddesses, including Hestia and Freya. But as Loki states, it is because she has such a big heart, she needed a bigger chest as no god or goddess can hold any animosity towards her.
Zeus (ゼウス, Zeusu)
Voiced by: Atsushi Ono (Japanese); Chris Gibson (English)
Bell's adoptive grandfather and the former head of the Zeus Familia. His familia used to be the strongest in Orario alongside the Hera familia, until both the latter were destroyed by the One Eyed Black Dragon, and was banished from Orario for unknown reasons. He took Bell in after his father's death as one of his children's death at the hands of the dragon. He was always held in high regards, even among the other gods and asks Hermes to watch over Bell for him.^{[LN 5]} Currently he works as a retired farmer somewhere beyond Orario, though he faked his death to Bell to inspire him to become an adventurer in Orario.
Artemis (アルテミス, Arutemisu)
Voiced by: Maaya Sakamoto (Japanese); Avery Smithhart (English)
An anime original character from the movie Is It Wrong to Try to Pick Up Girls in a Dungeon?: Arrow of the Orion, she was the head of the Artemis Famillia, the goddess of hunt. Prior to the story, she was captured and was used as a vessel by Antares, a reawakened monster who plots to destroy Orario using her deity powers. Her fragment however escapes and recruits Bell and the others to stop him, with Bell on the finish blow on her body to end her suffering, despite a promise of a 10.000 years of romance to Bell.
Erebus / Eren (エレボス, Erebosu)
Voiced by: Yoshitsugu Matsuoka
A god who believed that true evil was to be hated by everyone and, as the God who presided over evil, he was determined to always be that way. When asked what justice was, he replied that absolute justice was an ideal, something that had to be reached and won, making possible the impossible. Hermes described him as a hopeless person who liked to isolate himself.

=== Adventurers ===
Bors Elder (ボールス・エルダー, Boorusu Erudaa)
Voiced by: Tarō Yamaguchi
A level 3 city representative of Rivira, a small town in the safe zone of Floor 18.
Mord Latro (モルド・ラトロー, Morudo Ratorō)
Voiced by: Kōichi Sōma
A level 2 adventurer from the Ogma Familia. Initially a hostile to Bell due to jealousy of his growth, but later comes to respect him as an adventurer after the events of the Black Goliath.
Jura Halmer (ジュラ・ハルマー, Jura Harumā)
Voiced by: Chiharu Sawashiro
A former member of the Rudra Familia, one of the associated Familia with Evilus. After the destruction of his Familia and was left for dead at the hands of Ryu, he spends five years learning and studying the Juggernaut, as he wish to harness its power and used it to enact revenge on Ryu. He later attempts to tame the Juggernaut, only to backfire and gets killed by it.
Albert Wallenstein (アルバート・ヴァルトシュテイン, Arubaato Varutoshutein)
Voiced by: Daisuke Hirakawa
Ais' father, who was known to be the strongest adventurer and was hailed a legend in Orario, until he was killed alongside the Zeus and Hera Familia by the Black Dragon.
Aria Wallenstein (アリア, Aria)
Voiced by: Kana Ueda
Ais' spirit mother, who was known to be the strongest mage in Orario. She was presumed dead after the attack on the Black Dragon, though her fate is currently unknown.

=== Past Incarnations of other characters ===
Argonaut (アルゴノゥト, Arugonouto)
Voiced by: Yoshitsugu Matsuoka
Bell's past incarnation.
Feena (フィーナ, Fīna)
Voiced by: Juri Kimura
Lefiya's past incarnation. A half elf who is Argonaut's adopted sister.
Ryulu (リュールゥ, Ryūrū)
Voiced by: Saori Hayami
Ryu's past incarnation. An elf who is known as one of the three great poets.

== Works cited ==
=== Anime ===
- EP 1: "Adventurer (Bell Cranel)"
- EP 2: "Monster Festival (Monsterphilia)"
- EP 3: "The Blade of a God (Hestia Knife)"
- EP 4: "The Weak (Supporter)"
- EP 5: "Spellbook (Grimoire)"
- EP 6: "Reason (Liliruca Arde)"
- EP 7: "Sword Princess (Ais Wallenstein)"
- EP 8: "Wanting To Be A Hero (Argonaut)"
- EP 9: "Blacksmith (Welf Crozzo)"
- EP 10: "Procession of Monsters (Pass Parade)"
- EP 11: "Labyrinth Utopia (Under Resort)"
- EP 12: "Evil Intentions (Show)"
- EP 13: "The Story of a Familia (Familia Myth)"

=== Light novels ===
Dungeon ni Deai o Motomeru no wa Machigatteiru Darō ka series

- Vol. 1: Omori, Fujino (January 15, 2013). ダンジョンに出会いを求めるのは間違っているだろうか (in Japanese). Illustrated by Suzuhito Yasuda. SB Creative. ISBN 978-4-7973-7280-9. and Is It Wrong to Try to Pick Up Girls in a Dungeon? Vol. 1. Yen Press. December 16, 2014. ISBN 978-0-316-33915-5.
- Vol. 2: Omori, Fujino (February 15, 2013). ダンジョンに出会いを求めるのは間違っているだろうか 2 (in Japanese). Illustrated by Suzuhito Yasuda. SB Creative. ISBN 978-4-7973-7307-3. and Is It Wrong to Try to Pick Up Girls in a Dungeon? Vol. 2. Yen Press. April 21, 2015. ISBN 978-0-316-34014-4.
- Vol. 3: Omori, Fujino (May 15, 2013). ダンジョンに出会いを求めるのは間違っているだろうか 3 (in Japanese). Illustrated by Suzuhito Yasuda. SB Creative. ISBN 978-4-7973-7362-2. and Is It Wrong to Try to Pick Up Girls in a Dungeon? Vol. 3. Yen Press. August 18, 2015. ISBN 978-0-316-34016-8.
- Vol. 4: Omori, Fujino (December 14, 2013). ダンジョンに出会いを求めるのは間違っているだろうか 4 (in Japanese). Illustrated by Suzuhito Yasuda. SB Creative. ISBN 978-4-7973-7514-5. and Is It Wrong to Try to Pick Up Girls in a Dungeon? Vol. 4. Yen Press. December 15, 2015. ISBN 978-0-316-34016-8.
- Vol. 5: Omori, Fujino (May 15, 2014). ダンジョンに出会いを求めるのは間違っているだろうか 5 (in Japanese). Illustrated by Suzuhito Yasuda. SB Creative. ISBN 978-4-7973-7714-9.
- Vol. 6: Omori, Fujino (November 14, 2014). ダンジョンに出会いを求めるのは間違っているだろうか 6 (in Japanese). Illustrated by Suzuhito Yasuda. SB Creative. ISBN 978-4-7973-8058-3.
- Vol. 7: Omori, Fujino (April 14, 2015). ダンジョンに出会いを求めるのは間違っているだろうか 7 (in Japanese). Illustrated by Suzuhito Yasuda. SB Creative. ISBN 978-4-7973-8311-9.
- Vol. 8: Omori, Fujino (June 15, 2015). ダンジョンに出会いを求めるのは間違っているだろうか 8 (in Japanese). Illustrated by Suzuhito Yasuda. SB Creative.
- Vol. 9: Omori, Fujino (September 12, 2015). ダンジョンに出会いを求めるのは間違っているだろうか 9 (in Japanese). Illustrated by Suzuhito Yasuda. SB Creative.

Dungeon ni Deai o Motomeru no wa Machigatteiru Darō ka Gaiden: Sword Oratoria series

- Vol. 1: Omori, Fujino (January 15, 2014). ダンジョンに出会いを求めるのは間違っているだろうか外伝 ソード・オラトリア 1 (in Japanese). Illustrated by Kiyotaka Haimura. SB Creative. ISBN 978-4-7973-7553-4.
- Vol. 2: Omori, Fujino (June 13, 2014). ダンジョンに出会いを求めるのは間違っているだろうか外伝 ソード・オラトリア 2 (in Japanese). Illustrated by Kiyotaka Haimura. SB Creative. ISBN 978-4-7973-7716-3.
- Vol. 3: Omori, Fujino (December 15, 2014). ダンジョンに出会いを求めるのは間違っているだろうか外伝 ソード・オラトリア 3 (in Japanese). Illustrated by Kiyotaka Haimura. SB Creative. ISBN 978-4-7973-8203-7.
- Vol. 4: Omori, Fujino (May 15, 2015). ダンジョンに出会いを求めるのは間違っているだろうか外伝 ソード・オラトリア 4 (in Japanese). Illustrated by Kiyotaka Haimura. SB Creative. ISBN 978-4-7973-8312-6.

=== Manga ===
Dungeon ni Deai o Motomeru no wa Machigatteiru Darō ka manga volumes by Masaya Takamura. Released on Gangan Online and published by Square Enix.

- ダンジョンに出会いを求めるのは間違っているだろうか 1 (in Japanese). December 13, 2013. ISBN 978-4757541665.
- ダンジョンに出会いを求めるのは間違っているだろうか 2 (in Japanese). May 14, 2014. ISBN 978-4757543041.
- ダンジョンに出会いを求めるのは間違っているだろうか 3 (in Japanese). November 13, 2014. ISBN 978-4757544642.

Dungeon ni Deai o Motomeru no wa Machigatteiru Darō ka Gaiden: Sword Oratoria manga volume by Fujino Ōmori, illustrated by Takashi Yagi. Released on Gangan Online and published by Square Enix.

- Omori, Fujino. ダンジョンに出会いを求めるのは間違っているだろうか外伝 ソード・オラトリア (in Japanese). Illustrated by Takashi Yagi.
