= Fujino Ōmori =

Japanese light novel author

- 大森藤ノ
- Occupation: Novelist
- Writing career
- Pen name: Fujino
- Notable works: Is It Wrong to Try to Pick Up Girls in a Dungeon? Wistoria: Wand and Sword
- Notable awards: 4th GA Bunko's Award

Fujino Ōmori is a Japanese novelist, popularly known for writing the Is It Wrong to Try to Pick Up Girls in a Dungeon? (Danmachi) light novel series. His age is unknown, but he mentioned in the afterword of the 14th volume of Is It Wrong to Try to Pick Up Girls in a Dungeon? from 2018 that he was under 30 years old.

== Career ==
In early 2013, Fujino Ōmori published his first novel in the Is It Wrong to Try to Pick Up Girls in a Dungeon? light novel series. It was submitted with the title Familia Myth to the 4th GA Bunko Award, where it won and received an offer to have it published by Bunko. The series is on going with 21 volumes till the date. Several spin-off series have been made. Ōmori's light novel series have been adapted into manga, going up to 89 chapters in its adaptation of the first 5 books, and currently 13 chapters for its 7th book adaptation, skipping the 6th. It also got a television anime series, which began airing in 2015, and is currently in its 5th season which goes up to the 14th book. A mobile video game, Danmachi: Memoria Freese, was released in 2017.

In December 2020, Ōmori launched a manga series, titled Wistoria: Wand and Sword, with illustrations by Toshi Aoi in Kodansha's Bessatsu Shōnen Magazine.

== Bibliography ==
- Is It Wrong to Try to Pick Up Girls in a Dungeon? (ダンジョンに出会いを求めるのは間違っているだろうか) (Illustrated by Suzuhito Yasuda, published by GA Bunko, 2013–present)
  - Is It Wrong to Try to Pick Up Girls in a Dungeon? On the Side: Sword Oratoria (ダンジョンに出会いを求めるのは間違っているだろうか外伝 ソード・オラトリア) (Illustrated by Kiyotaka Haimura, published by GA Bunko, 2014–present)
  - Is It Wrong to Try to Pick Up Girls in a Dungeon? Familia Chronicle (Illustrated by Niritsu, published by GA Bunko, 5 volumes, 2017 -)
- Wistoria: Wand and Sword (杖と剣のウィストリア) (Illustrated by Toshi Aoi, published by Kodansha, serialized in Bessatsu Shōnen Magazine, 2020–present)
