= Sword Oratoria =

Japanese light novel series

- Is It Wrong to Try to Pick Up Girls in a Dungeon? On the Side: Sword Oratoria
- First light novel volume cover

ダンジョンに出会いを求めるのは間違っているだろうか外伝 ソード・オラトリア (Danjon ni Deai o Motomeru no wa Machigatteiru Darō ka Gaiden: Sōdo Oratoria)
- Genre: Adventure; Fantasy
- Light novel
- Written by: Fujino Ōmori
- Illustrated by: Kiyotaka Haimura
- Published by: SB Creative
- English publisher: NA: Yen Press
- Imprint: GA Bunko
- Original run: January 15, 2014 – present
- Volumes: 16
- Manga
- Written by: Fujino Ōmori
- Illustrated by: Takashi Yagi
- Published by: Square Enix
- English publisher: NA: Yen Press
- Magazine: Gangan Joker
- Original run: May 22, 2014 – present
- Volumes: 34
- Anime television series

Sword Oratoria: Is It Wrong to Try to Pick Up Girls in a Dungeon? On the Side
- Directed by: Yōhei Suzuki
- Produced by: Yuichi Shiji; Seiji Miyazaki; Ryutaro Kawakami; Hiroto Yonemori
- Written by: Hideki Shirane
- Music by: Keiji Inai
- Studio: J.C.Staff
- Licensed by: AUS: Crunchyroll (Note: Through Madman Anime.); NA: Sentai Filmworks; UK: MVM Films
- Original network: Tokyo MX, KBS, SUN, BS11
- Original run: April 14, 2017 – June 30, 2017
- Episodes: 12
- Other series
- Is It Wrong to Try to Pick Up Girls in a Dungeon?
- icon

Is It Wrong to Try to Pick Up Girls in a Dungeon? On the Side: Sword Oratoria (Japanese: ダンジョンに出会いを求めるのは間違っているだろうか外伝 ソード・オラトリア, Hepburn: Danjon ni Deai o Motomeru no wa Machigatteiru Darō ka Gaiden: Sōdo Oratoria), or DanMachi: Sword Oratoria for short, is a Japanese light novel side story series, written by Fujino Ōmori and illustrated by Kiyotaka Haimura (based on the designs by Suzuhito Yasuda). The story focuses on the female character Ais Wallenstein from the parent Is It Wrong to Try to Pick Up Girls in a Dungeon? series.

== Overview ==
=== Setting ===
The story and timeframe, just like Is It Wrong to Try to Pick Up Girls in a Dungeon?, takes place in the fictional city of Orario whose main feature place is the Dungeon (ダンジョン, Danjon) which contains an assortment of monsters from goblins to dragons. Adventurers visit the dungeon to defeat monsters and take their crystal shards, which are used to craft magic items, among other treasures; however, they can also be exchanged for the world's currency. The people of Orario join groups called Familia (ファミリア, Famiria), who serve a range of functions from dungeon crawling to crafting items. Each Familia is named after and serves a resident deity. In a fashion similar to role-playing games, the adventurers are grouped into levels, with the levels and their abilities advancing according to their achievements.

=== Plot ===
The story follows the same timeframe as Is It Wrong to Try to Pick Up Girls in a Dungeon?, but this time centers on the Loki Familia. It highlights events of the Loki Familia that were only mentioned in the main story, overlapping with events from it.

== Media ==
=== Light novel ===
A side story light novel series titled Is It Wrong to Try to Pick Up Girls in a Dungeon? On the Side: Sword Oratoria (ダンジョンに出会いを求めるのは間違っているだろうか外伝 ソード・オラトリア, Danjon ni Deai o Motomeru no wa Machigatteiru Darō ka Gaiden: Sōdo Oratoria), written by Fujino Ōmori with illustrations by Kiyotaka Haimura (based on the designs by Suzuhito Yasuda), was first published on January 15, 2014. Sixteen volumes have been published as of October 11, 2025.

==== Volume list ====
No.	Original release date	Original ISBN	English release date	English ISBN
1	January 15, 2014	978-4-7973-7553-4	October 25, 2016	978-0-316-31533-3
Prologue: "The Labryinth Tale of Beginning"; Chapter 1: "Loki Familia"; Chapter 2: "Labyrinth Confusion"; Chapter 3: "White Rabbit"; Chapter 4: "Between Calm and Passion"; Chapter 5: "Outbreak of Battle"; Epilogue: "Under the Sky"
Sword Princess Ais Wallenstein. The swordswoman renowned as the strongest explores the dungeon with her companions. Several mysteries and enemies assault them on the 50th floor, but the Sword Princess Ais Wallenstein called her wind and dealt a blow against the darkness of the labyrinth! And the fateful encounter with the boy - "Are you all right?" The interchanging story of the girl and the boy in the land of Orario!
2	June 13, 2014	978-4-7973-7716-3	February 21, 2017	978-0-316-31816-7
Prologue: "The Incident in the Bedroom"; Chapter 1: "Daily Life Scenery"; Chapter 2: "Incident"; Chapter 3: "Lower World Detective Loki"; Chapter 4: "Jewel"; Chapter 5: "Battle of Rivira"; Chapter 6: "Dry Scream"; Epilogue: "Reunion Comes Suddenly"
A room soaked in red blood, the choking smell of steel, and the body of an adventurer with its head crushed. A brief moment after solving the conflict at the Monster Feria, Ais and the others are involved in a mysterious murder. While investigating and going after the evil murderer, the girls come face to face with a matter that shakes the city and the labyrinth. "What is this...?" Fighting over the mysterious jewel, the surface and the underground cross and the darkness hiding within Orario quietly begins to move!
3	December 15, 2014	978-4-7973-8203-7	June 20, 2017	978-0-316-31818-1
Prologue: "Evil Omen"; Chapter 1: "Invitation from the Black Clothes"; Chapter 2: "Let's party?"; Chapter 3: "The Girl of Appearance"; Chapter 4: "Vendetta"; Chapter 5: "Hell and Hell"; Epilogue: "Capturing the White Rabbit"
Ais has undergone a fierce battle with the mysterious female tamer and the Monster Rex Udaeus. However, there was a reason why the Sword Princess' expression was dull even though she finally reached her desired Level 6. One - she was run away from once again by the white haired boy she finally met again. Two - the female tamer knew a name that only she was supposed to know. However, a dungeon exploration quest comes to her seemingly to test her, as if the answer she desired was there...
4	May 15, 2015	978-4-7973-8312-6	October 31, 2017	978-0-316-31822-8
Prologue: "On the Morning of Determination...?"; Prior Chapter: "And the Boy"; Rear Chapter: "To Adventure"; Epilogue: "The Revealed Scenario"
"How are you able to get stronger that quickly?" "...I think it's because there's a place I want to reach no matter what" "Me too..." She has an earnest desire. There is a place far away that she needs to reach. The attempt at the unknown 59th floor begins.
5	October 14, 2015	978-4-7973-8508-3	February 27, 2018	978-0-316-44251-0
Prologue: "Moment of Water and Rest"; Chapter 1: "Passage and Present Situation"; Intermediate Chapter: "The Back Side of the Comedy"; Chapter 2: "Rabbit Rookie"; Intermediate Chapter: "The Back Side of the Peace"; Chapter 3: "1/3 Pure Rage"; Intermediate Chapter: "The Back Side of the Stage"; Epilogue: "The Place to Return"
The Loki Familia begins their return home after the battle on the 59th floor. However, on the way there, they are forced to rest on the 18th floor after encountering an irregular situation in the dungeon. On the floor was the white haired boy that Ais desired to meet again... "Bell...?" Ais and the others were interested in the Record Holder for the fastest level up, though there was one Elven girl that fell further into a bad mood. Lefiya was trying to contain herself - however, her anger exploded following the boy's actions! "Wait up!" "Help!" The adventurers' brief moment of calm!
6	June 15, 2016	978-4-7973-8846-6	June 26, 2018	978-0-316-44252-7
Prologue: "Dream at Night in the Middle of Spring"; Chapter 1: "Quest Result & Next Quest"; Chapter 2: "Port City Melen"; Chapter 3: "Country of the Female Warriors"; Chapter 4: "Older Sister and Younger Sister. Night and Morning. Darkness and Light"; Chapter 5: "Duo of the Sun and Moon"; Chapter 6: "The End of Fighting"; Epilogue: "Disturbing Elements"
"A momentary rest for fighting girls! Lake bathing instead of sea bathing!" The Loki Familia goes outside of Orario! After returning from their latest expedition, Ais and the others head to the port city of Melen to search for the second entrance to the dungeon. Avoiding attempts from an ulterior motive filled Goddess, the girls rest at a blue lake. However, a ship from foreign lands brings trouble to the town. The Familia of the Goddess of fighting and slaughter, the Kali Familia. Tione and Tiona's unpleasant fate. Amidst the threatening shadows, the twin sisters come face to face with their vexing past. "I want to see the future of fighting"
7	December 14, 2016	978-4-7973-8934-0	October 30, 2018	978-1-9753-0286-3
Prologue: "Villains"; Chapter 1: "The Now of the Labyrinth City"; Chapter 2: "Dungeon Trap"; Chapter 3: "Feast of Death"; Chapter 4: "Becoming the Sword's Wind"; Chapter 5: "All Out Angry and Sorrowful War"; Epilogue: "What's Yearned for is-"
Having gained clues in Melen, the Loki Familia begin their investigation of Daedalus Street. After finding their base, Ais and the others were about to hunt down the remnants of Evilus when- "The Man Made Labyrinth Knossos...become the foundation of the ancestral masterpiece" An unprecedented persistence of evil bares its fangs. A cursed clan, the hero's destiny, the appearance of the last Evil God, and the return of the red haired creature. The nest of evil is now bringing Ais and the others their greatest crisis. "Goodbye, Loki Familia. Have a good nightmare"
8	April 14, 2017	978-4-7973-9234-0	February 19, 2019	978-1-9753-2779-8
Prologue: "Ridicule of the Strong"; Chapter 1: "Lonely Wolf"; Chapter 2: "Is the Order a Wolf?"; Chapter 3: "Tears that Won't Flow"; Chapter 4: "Solitary Night"; Chapter 5: "Wolf Covered with Injuries"; Epilogue: "Instead of Goodbye"
"Didn't I tell you? Weaklings are a burden" Following their retreat from Knossos and his scorn toward the dead, Bete begins to isolate himself from the Familia, however... "There you are! Bete Loga!" Due to the sudden and fierce courting from the Amazoness girl Lena, they gradually begin to live together! His interactions with her makes him recall his memories about "the fang" and causes him to face his own past. On the other hand, the Familia of the God of Death quietly begins their operations. The assassin's dagger that stole his companions draws near to Bete once again-
9	June 15, 2017	978-4-7973-9281-4	June 18, 2019	978-1-9753-2781-1
Prologue: "Recollections of an Elf"; Chapter 1: "An Incident in Camp"; Recollection Chapter 1: "The Girl's Beginnings"; Chapter 2: "Momentary Calmness"; Recollection Chapter 2: "Are you a Sword?"; Chapter 3: "From the Mountains to the North"; Recollection Chapter 3: "Gods and People of Bygone Days"; Chapter 4: "Those That Remain, Those That are Left Behind"; Recollection Chapter 4: "The Eternity the Wind Desires"; Epilogue: "The Now the Wind Desired"
The Rakia Army has dispatched their troops. A short while after Bete's actions helped end the Amazoness hunting incident, the Loki Familia mobilizes to intercept the invaders from outside the city. As the overly strong adventurers effortlessly destroy the enemy ranks, the girl's unexpected question knocks on the doors of Riveria's memories. "Won't you tell us a story about Ais-san's past?" This is a secret story of the girl that was famed as the "doll princess" at the time. Ais Wallenstein. Arriving at the labyrinth city nine years earlier, the girl quickly grew through her talent and tenacity. She was a girl feared by many adventurers - on the other hand, there was a harsh battle between her and the adults that tried to educate her! "Where are you, Ais? Come out!" "I don't want to study, I hate studying!" Sometimes she was scolded, sometimes she was admonished, and sometimes she was smiled at. The lonely girl who sought power learned the bond of family.
10	May 15, 2018	978-4-7973-9460-3	October 29, 2019	978-1-9753-3171-9
Prologue: "A Certain Girl's Monologue"; Chapter 1: "Sign"; Chapter 2: "His Name is Fool"; Intermission: "The Elf's Anger"; Chapter 3: "The Braver's Melancholy The Sword Princess' Anguish"; Intermission: "The Gods' Secret Conversation"; Chapter 4: "Daedalus Skirmish: Behind the Scenes"; Intermission: "Their Respective Battles"; Chapter 5: "Brave Soul!"; Intermission: "The Outcome of the Plan"; Chapter 6: "The Braver's Self-Restraint"; Epilogue: "The Girl's Conclusion"
The Sword Princess anguished and the Braver resolved himself. "If someone cries because of monsters - I'll kill monsters" And so, "the day" came. An opportunity of fate arrives for the Loki Familia looking for a "key" to the man made labyrinth, an abnormal situation that brings turbulence to Orario. As various forces become involved because of the "armed monsters" on the surface, the long-awaited hero will fall - and a new fool is born. The Sword Princess anguishes. The Braver resolves himself. Amidst the battle concerning people and monsters, various feelings will cross at the stage of the decisive battle, the labyrinth city!
11	January 15, 2019	978-4-7973-9460-3	February 18, 2020	978-1-9753-3173-3
Prologue: "Night of Agony, Horrible Darkness"; Chapter 1: "That's Why I Begin to Run Too"Avengers ~Knossos War~"; Chapter 2: "Decisive Battle Intermission"; Chapter 3: "The God's True Face"; Chapter 4: "Avengers ~Knossos War~"; Chapter 5: "Manifestation of Delusion"; Chapter 6: "And the God Laughed"; Epilogue: "Whodunit"
"I wasn't able...to cut a monster" Following her battle with Bell, a disappointed Ais was troubled. Her reason to fight, the broken vow, the monster's tears. Aware of everything, the girl goes to meet the boy once again. "The operation will begin in ten days" And the clock hands continue to move. The approaching Knossos subjugation operation. The Gods coalesce after removing the barriers between themselves, the adventurers put their wills together as one, and the Xenos gather on that fateful day. What awaits them are the remnants of Evilus, the Creatures, and Enyo. The battle for the fate of Orario begins now!
12	July 12, 2019	978-4-8156-0264-2	July 21, 2020	978-1-9753-1327-2
Prologue: "The Scene the Girl Saw for the Last Time"; Chapter 1: "The Cost of the Loss"; Chapter 2: "Sign of Darkness"; Chapter 3: "Rabbit Oracle"; Chapter 4: "The Nameless Heroes"; Chapter 5: "Final War"; Chapter 6: "Dark Divine Will"; Chapter 7: "Final War II"; Chapter 8: "Hero Unison"; Epilogue: "Rain of Light"
The beginning of a new Oratoria. The clock ticks dangerously close to the beginning of the final battle. No matter who wins, who loses, who lives, who dies, there will be no glory or riches for the taking. Those who fall shall not be remembered in the annals of history, joining the long funeral procession snaking around the heavens. Even so, the adventurers plan to stand strong against the greatest evil the world has seen in a thousand years. Having come to terms with their fate, they prepare for the ultimate struggle - for pride, for solidarity, for justice, for restoring peace on the mortal realm...
13	February 15, 2023	978-4-8156-0982-5	December 17, 2024	978-1-9753-9437-0
Prologue: "The Sequel to Loss and Resolve"; Chapter 1: "Girl's Revolution"; Chapter 2: "Nostalgic Schoolhouse"; "Fairy Canon 1"; Chapter 3: "Class Is in Session"; "Fairy Canon 2"; Chapter 4: "Those Who Teach and Those Who Are Taught"; Chapter 5: "The Mirror's Voice"; Epilogue: "My Cliché Answer I Got From You"
14	March 15, 2023	978-4-8156-1434-8; 978-4-8156-1872-8 (SE)	October 21, 2025	978-1-9753-9439-4
15	January 12, 2025	978-4-8156-2870-3; 978-4-8156-3074-4 (SE)	October 13, 2026	979-8-8554-3889-5
16	October 11, 2025	978-4-8156-3296-0; 978-4-8156-3295-3 (SE)	—	—
17	February 12, 2027	978-4-8156-4292-1; 978-4-8156-4291-4 (SE)	—	—

=== Manga ===
A manga adaptation of the light novel series, with art by Takashi Yagi, began serialization in Square Enix's shōnen manga magazine Gangan Joker from May 22, 2014. Yen Press later licensed the manga series to be released in North America.

=== Anime ===
An anime television series adaptation of the Sword Oratoria light novels aired from April 14, 2017 to June 30, 2017. The series is directed by Yōhei Suzuki and written by Hideki Shirane, with animation by J.C.Staff, character designs by Shigeki Kimoto and music by Keiji Inai. The series ran for 12 episodes. Sentai Filmworks have licensed the series and simulcasted the series on Amazon Anime Strike. MVM Films will release the series in the United Kingdom. Yuka Iguchi performed for the opening theme titled "RE-ILLUSION".

No.	Title	Original release date
1	"The Sword Princess and the Elf"; Transliteration: "Kenki to Yōsei" (Japanese: 剣姫と妖精)	April 14, 2017
Magic-user/elf Lefiya of the Loki Familia is upset with herself that she is unable to be of more help to her comrades, especially to Sword Princess Ais Wallenstein, whom she carries a crush for. While expeditioning on the 50th floor of the Dungeon, the Loki Familia are attacked by a hoard of poisonous caterpillar monsters, which disintegrate anything they touch. Lefiya tries to cast a magic spell on them, while fighters Tiona, Tione, and Bete keep them busy, but panics and is unable to finish the spell, leaving Ais to jump in and easily take them out with her wind magic. With the 51st floor currently blocked off due to the fight, the Familia head back to Orario to regroup. On their way out, a hoard of minotaurs suddenly appear and start escaping into the upper floors. One of them attacks a lone adventurer, which Ais steps in to defeat, saving him. The speechless boy runs away scared, while Bete looks on laughing, with Ais all the while confused at the boy and annoyed at the laughing.
2	"Fittings and Purchases"; Transliteration: "Shichaku to Kōnyū" (Japanese: 試着と購入)	April 21, 2017
Returning from the expedition, the Familia is greeted by Loki, who proceeds to try to grope all the girls, with Lefiya unable to escape. Knowing that Ais has her own issues she's dealing with, Lefiya wants to do something to try to help her, like giving her some gifts as good luck charms. Ais starts to feel restless with herself that she still hasn't surpassed Lv. 5 yet. That night, while celebrating at the tavern, Bete starts joking and insulting about the boy Ais saved from the minotaur, upsetting her. The boy, Bell, overhears all of this and storms out of the tavern, distressing Ais even more. After confiding in Riveria that she wants to apologize to him, Tione, Tiona, and Lefiya take her out shopping to try to cheer her up, buying her a dress she likes. Realizing what Lefiya's been doing for her lately, Ais apologizes and thanks her for everything and for caring about her.
3	"Festivals and Courage"; Transliteration: "Saiten to Yūki" (Japanese: 祭典と勇気)	April 28, 2017
At a banquet for the Gods at Ganesha's, Loki converses with Dionysus and Demeter before running off. While training in the Dungeon with Ais, Lefiya asks her on a date to the upcoming Monsterphilia, which she accepts; Loki later states that Ais will be going with her to it as her escort, crushing Lefiya. Loki and Ais meet up with Freya, who reveals someone from another Familia has caught her attention and wants Loki to play along with whatever plan she's cooked up, before abruptly leaving. As the event starts, Freya unleashes several of the monsters to cause havoc, which Ais heads out to deal with. Tiona, Tione, and Lefiya follow suit, but are all distracted by surprise plant monsters that start attacking the courtyard. Despite being knocked out and badly injured, Lefiya stands back up and successfully executes her summon boost spell, completely freezing the enemies. That night, Loki questions Freya about why she summoned the monsters, only to learn she had nothing to do with the plant creatures that attacked them. Outside, Dionysus, holding one of the plant crystals, looks on and smiles.
4	"The Murder and the Jewel"; Transliteration: "Satsujin to Hōgyoku" (Japanese: 殺人と宝玉)	May 5, 2017
An adventurer in Rivera shares a bed with a red-headed woman, only to be choked to death by her. That night, Ais has a dream about her mother and father. Obtaining a huge sum of debt from a sword she broke, Ais prepares to head back into the Dungeon, with most of the core Familia following along with her. Bete stays behind as Loki's escort to investigate the sewers beneath the city, where they uncover more of the plant monsters. Along with recognizing the magic stone being similar to that of the caterpillar monsters, Bete notes the scent in the sewers is the same as Dionysus, whom they run into. Dionysus reveals to Loki he was investigating the monsters as well, saying he believes Ouranos to be responsible. Arriving in Rivera, Ais and her group discover about the murder and offer their assistance in uncovering the mystery. Finn deduces the person is still in town, so they start inspecting everyone, where Ais and Lefiya notice a mysterious faun girl running off. The girl, Lulune of the Hermes Familia, reveals she is in possession of a package given to her by the murdered man, as part of a quest by another mystery person. Discovering it to be an orb with a creature inside, Ais starts to freak out and hyperventilate, while a scarred man looks on and summons more plant monsters.
5	"The Red-head and the Lone Ruler"; Transliteration: "Akagami to Ko-ō" (Japanese: 赤髪と孤王)	May 12, 2017
As Rivera is under attack from the plant monsters, Ais, Lefiya, and Lulune are cornered by the scarred adventurer. Ais figures out they are actually the murderer, wearing the face of the adventurer as a disguise. The red-headed woman fights with Ais, trying to reclaim "the seed", and after seeing Ais' wind magic, the woman refers to her as "Aria", shocking Ais. The seed, reacting to her wind magic, fuses with a plant monster and evolves into a giant woman-looking creature. Meanwhile, Loki confronts Ouranos about what's been going on, with him standing firm that the Guild isn't responsible. As Loki slyly leaves, his assistant, Fels, states that someone must've instigated this, and pushes Ouranos not to make an enemy of Loki. Ais finds herself completely outmatched by the woman, but is saved thanks to the rest of the Familia, and unable to match against Finn and Riveria, the woman retreats. Unable to find anymore leads, the Familia head back home, while Ais has another dream about her mother, Aria, and her father leaving her. Starting to feel even more reckless, she decides to stay in the Dungeon for a while to train, with Riveria reluctantly staying back to watch over her. Running into the Floor 37 boss, Ais stands her ground to face it alone.
6	"Subjugation and Escape"; Transliteration: "Tōbatsu to Tōbō" (Japanese: 討伐と逃亡)	May 19, 2017
Still distressed over losing the last fight, Ais pushes herself to keep getting stronger. Despite Riveria's attempted assistance, Ais pushes through and manages to take out the dangerous Floor 37 boss all on her own. After being scolded by Riveria, Ais tells her about the red-headed woman calling her "Aria". In response, Riveria reminds her that everyone in the Familia is her family and are always there for her. On the way back, the two discover an unconscious Bell on the floor of the Dungeon; Ais stays back to try to apologize to him. Comforting and giving him a lap pillow, Bell awakens, and too embarrassed, rolls away before she can apologize, to her annoyance. Flustered over this, she goes to see Loki to get a status update, where they are shocked to discover that Ais has finally jumped up to Level 6, which Ais herself isn't sure exactly how to react towards. While preparing to head back to the Dungeon, Ais runs into Guild worker Eina, who thanks her for assisting Bell, to Ais' pleasure. Overhearing some other adventurers talking about Bell falling into a trap, Ais runs off after him. She finds him cornered by monsters, baffled at his sudden magical abilities and rapid growth in strength. She takes out the rest of them, but is unable to apologize before he once again runs off. After picking up his lost equipment, she is startled by Fels, who reveals he gave the original quest to Lulune, and asks for her help for a new quest.
7	"Requests and Divisions"; Transliteration: "Irai to Bundan" (Japanese: 依頼と分断)	May 26, 2017
Fels tells Ais about a monster outbreak on the 24th floor and wants her to investigate, requesting her due to the possible connection to it and the red-headed woman she fought; Ais accepts. Dionysus, also aware of these rumours, informs Loki about Ouranos' possible connection. When she receives a letter from Ais about her quest, she orders Lefiya and Bete to head down there and help her; Dionysus has his right-hand, Filvis, also join them. In Rivera, Ais meets up with Lulune and the rest of the Hermes Familia, who are assisting in the quest. Arriving on the 24th floor, Ais and the group discover the source of the monster hoard, which Ais takes out with ease thanks to her level up. In the pantry, they learn the monster's food source has been blocked off by a plant-like chrysalis. Entering it, they are attacked and separated by the red-headed woman and another masked figure, who have been controlling it and watching over them. Meanwhile, heading down the dungeon, Lefiya tries to converse with Filvis but finds her unresponsive and closed off. Making it to Rivera, the three of them learn from a shopkeep Ais met with earlier about her location. He also tells Lefiya to stay away from Filvis, referring to her as "the Banshee", a cursed adventurer in which everyone she's ever partied up with has died.
8	"The Corruption and the Maid"; Transliteration: "Kegare to Shōjo" (Japanese: 穢れと少女)	June 2, 2017
Lefiya and the shopkeeper talk about the "Nightmare on Level 27" in which adventurers were led into a trap by the vicious Evilus factions, led by Vendetta, leaving Filvis as the only survivor. Due to every other time she's partied up with others all ending in tragedy, Filvis has gained the distinction as a cursed adventurer. While Bete confronts her about always running away from her problems, Lefiya shows up disregarding all the comments, insisting she continue to help them, and complimenting her on her beauty. Blushing, she thanks her and agrees to keep going. The red-headed woman, Revis, and Ais engage in combat, with the former annoyed at the latter's clear boost in strength and rank up. The Hermes Familia take on the masked figure and his giant plant monster, finding themselves completely outmatched until Lefiya, Bete, and Filvis show up in time for backup. The man, who is unveiled to be a resurrected Vendetta, now powered by a monster crystal of his own, reveals he's been creating these monsters with the purpose of driving out all the other dungeon creatures so that they may lay waste to Orario, all to serve a mysterious God woman he begins raving about. As the fighting continues, Ais and Revis' confrontation reconnects them to everyone else. After the main monster is destroyed and Vendetta is knocked out, Revis shows up killing him herself, devouring his power crystal to make herself stronger. With the room starting to cave-in, everyone makes their escape out, while Revis tells Ais to go to Level 59, which is where she will find what she is looking for. Several days later, the Loki Familia captains set their plans for a grand expedition down towards said floor. At the same time, Lefiya, Tiona, and Tione look through the library where they find a book, "Dungeon Oratoria", learning Aria was a Spirit, a magical being most beloved by the Gods.
9	"Training and Jealousy"; Transliteration: "Kunren to Shitto" (Japanese: 訓練と嫉妬)	June 9, 2017
As the Loki Familia prepare for their big expedition to the 59th Floor, Ais goes to see Eina for one last attempt to apologize to Bell. He shows up and they manage to stop him before he runs away. She finally apologizes for scaring him off all those times, and he apologizes for always running, thanking her for all the times she saved him. Ais offers him training to learn how to properly fight, while also intending to learn what causes him to improve so fast. Lefiya, wanting Ais' assistance to train, chases after her early the next morning, only to run into Bell, who quickly escapes after realizing she's also looking for Ais. She eventually spots Ais and Bell getting close, causing her to get depressed. That night, Ais tells her she's just training him, leading her to be relived, while still jealous, so agrees to keep it a secret if she also trains her as well, which Ais accepts. The following morning, Lefiya sneaks up to their training session, where she spots Ais giving Bell a lap pillow, to her shock. During their sparring session, Lefiya's unable to keep up with Ais' strength, but refuses to stop so she can keep up with Bell. The following day, she's annoyed that Ais will be spending the whole day with Bell, until she runs into Dionysus and Filvis, who after seeing them getting flustered with each other, recommends they go training in the Dungeon together. Filvis helps her improve her concurrent chanting for defence, and promises to help her more when she returns. While training with Bell, Ais asks him how he got so strong so fast, and he says there's someone he'll do just about anything to catch up to. Ais understands this, thinking back to losing her mother and father at a young age and wanting to help them. That night, they are surprised by Hestia, Bell's goddess, who shows up to console and comfort Bell. Walking back home, the three are suddenly attacked by masked fighters.
10	"The Boy and the Hero"; Transliteration: "Shōnen to Eiyū" (Japanese: 少年と英雄)	June 16, 2017
Ais defends herself against the masked fighters, who tell her to stay out of their Lady's way, before leaving. As Bell and Hestia head back home, she realizes the attackers are from the Freya Familia, but unsure about what they could want, with Loki hinting Ais might be getting involved in something Freya wants. Lefiya continues her training with Ais, which she thanks her and Filvis for how fast she's been able to improve herself. She runs into Bell again in the streets, telling him she's not going to lose. Ais and Bell conclude their training sessions, thanking and wishing each other good luck. On the day of the expedition, Ais sees Lulune again, who gives her a special charm she received from Fels. Joined by the Hephaestus Familia, the adventurers make their way in the Dungeon, when suddenly another group show up talking about a giant minotaur roaming the 9th floor, attacking a white-haired kid. Knowing it's Bell, Ais immediately dashes forward after him, only to be stopped by Ottar, Freya's second-hand, who challenges her to a duel. Realizing this is what the attackers warned her about, she tries to fight but is unable to get through his defences. The rest of the Loki Familia show up to assist, allowing her to escape; Finn gets Ottar to leave when he questions him about his and Freya's motivations. Ais once again shows up to save Bell, but he pushes her aside to take on the minotaur himself. They all look on in awe at his strength and abilities, as he manages to keep up and kill the beast, with Ais commenting to herself that he has the look of a true hero. Ais returns the unconscious Bell back to Hestia, as her and Riveria wonder what else is waiting for them.
11	"Adventure and the Unknown"; Transliteration: "Bōken to Michi" (Japanese: 冒険と未知)	June 23, 2017
Resting on the 50th floor, the Loki Familia finds themselves all hyped up and excited for the upcoming battles, inspired by Bell's fight with the minotaur. Lefiya feels jealous over hearing about all this, but still aims to keep up and assist her friends as much as she can. The core Familia members push their way through the next couple floors and the hordes of monsters and traps, until Lefiya is knocked down one of the holes. Bete, Tiona, Tione, and Gareth join her in free falling down towards the 58th floor to face against all the dragon monsters, while Ais, Riveria, Finn, and the rest take the long way down. Revis continues consuming more power crystals to get stronger, while arguing with a masked being watching over her. Ais' group catches up to the rest, and after taking out the remaining beasts, prepare to head into the unexplored Floor 59. Through the normal looking jungle environment, they tumble upon a plant monster feasting upon other caterpillars, when it suddenly transforms into a woman-looking creature, which Ais identifies as a Spirit after it calls her "Aria".
12	"Kin to the Gods (Sword Oratoria)"; Transliteration: "Kamigami to Kenzoku (Sōdo Oratoria)" (Japanese: 神々と眷族(ソード・オラトリア))	June 30, 2017
Confronting the beast, the Loki Familia figure out the reason behind the creation of the plant monsters was to act as a source of magic to power the Spirit. The being calls out for "Aria" as the next thing she wants to devour. The Spirit starts chanting incantations, blocking all forms of magic and attacks and decimating the group with several destructive blows. All seems lost until Finn makes a stand, using Bell to inspire everyone not to give up and keep fighting. They all work together to push through each of her defences, physical and magical, until Ais gets right up close to take the final blow. As the Spirit is about to hit her with a direct spell, Lefiya manages to send out another spell quickly to block it, allowing Ais to achieve the hit with her wind magic, completely destroying the Spirit. The group celebrates their success before eventually going back home. Meanwhile, Ouranos reveals to Fels that the Spirit was just the emulation of a deceased spirit, used as a decoy to hide the real threat on a much lower floor, claiming this to be the work of Enyo, a being that wants to completely destroy Orario. Revis sits back in contempt, stating she'll continue to get stronger, while Dionysus and Filvis also hear about Loki Familia's return. That night, Ais thanks Lefiya for saving her in the fight, while she thanks Ais for always being there for her. Loki shows up to once again try to grope the girls, but this time Lefiya manages to defend herself, getting praise from the others.

== Reception ==
The anime adaptation of Sword Oratoria has received mixed reviews. In a review of the first episode, Rebecca Silverman from Anime News Network gave it a B+ grade. Silverman stated that while the first episode was a good way of getting into the story's world, it did not focus on the protagonist Aiz Wallenstein as much as expected.
