= Is It Wrong to Try to Pick Up Girls in a Dungeon? =

Japanese light novel series

- First light novel volume cover, featuring Hestia (left) and Bell Cranel (right)

ダンジョンに出会いを求めるのは間違っているだろうか (Danjon ni Deai o Motomeru no wa Machigatte Iru Darō ka)
- Genre: Adventure; Fantasy comedy; Romance
- Light novel
- Written by: Fujino Ōmori
- Illustrated by: Suzuhito Yasuda
- Published by: SB Creative
- English publisher: NA: Yen Press
- Imprint: GA Bunko
- Original run: March 15, 2013 – present
- Volumes: 21
- Manga
- Written by: Fujino Ōmori
- Illustrated by: Kunieda (Vol. 1–10); Yamachi Taisei (Vol. 11–present)
- Published by: Square Enix
- English publisher: NA: Yen Press
- Magazine: Young Gangan
- Original run: August 2, 2013 – present
- Volumes: 17
- Manga

Is It Wrong to Try to Pick Up Girls in a Dungeon? 4-koma: Days of Goddess
- Written by: Masaya Takamura
- Published by: Square Enix
- English publisher: NA: Yen Press
- Imprint: Young Gangan Comics
- Magazine: Gangan Online
- Original run: August 14, 2014 – May 18, 2017
- Volumes: 2
- Anime television series
- Directed by: Yoshiki Yamakawa (I); Hideki Tachibana (II–V)
- Produced by: Nobuhiro Nakayama (I); Seiji Miyazaki (I); Ryuutarou Kawakami (I–III); Tadayuki Akita (II–III); Yuuichirou Shiji (II–V); Kazuki Uejima (IV–V); Kazuyuki Itou (V)
- Written by: Hideki Shirane; Fujino Ōmori (IV–V)
- Music by: Keiji Inai
- Studio: J.C.Staff
- Licensed by: AUS: Hanabee; NA: Sentai Filmworks; SEA: Plus Media Networks Asia; UK: Animatsu Entertainment (expired; S1); MVM Films S2-
- Original network: Tokyo MX, SUN, KBS, BS11, AT-X, TVA, Abema
- English network: SEA: Aniplus Asia
- Original run: April 4, 2015 – present
- Episodes: 74 + 3 OVAs
- Anime film
- Is It Wrong to Try to Pick Up Girls in a Dungeon?: Arrow of the Orion (2019)
- Other series
- Is It Wrong to Try to Pick Up Girls in a Dungeon? On the Side: Sword Oratoria
- Video games
- Is It Wrong to Try to Pick Up Girls in a Dungeon?: Infinite Combate (2017); Is It Wrong to Try to Pick Up Girls in a Dungeon?: Memoria Freese (2019)
- icon

Is It Wrong to Try to Pick Up Girls in a Dungeon? (Note: The title "ダンジョンに出会いを求めるのは間違っているだろうか" literally means "Is It Wrong to Seek Encounter in a Dungeon?". "出会い" (deai) does not necessarily mean "to pick up girls", but more generally "to meet someone new".) (Note: Japanese: ダンジョンに出会いを求めるのは間違っているだろうか, Hepburn: Danjon ni Deai o Motomeru no wa Machigatte Iru Darō ka), also known as DanMachi (ダンまち) for short, and with English subtitle Familia Myth, is a Japanese light novel series written by Fujino Ōmori and illustrated by Suzuhito Yasuda. SB Creative has published twenty-one volumes since January 2013 under their GA Bunko imprint.

It has received two manga adaptations as well as an anime television series adaptation produced by J.C.Staff, which aired as the first season from April to June 2015. An OVA was released on December 7, 2016. A second season and an original anime film adaptation were both announced in February 2018. The film, titled Is It Wrong to Try to Pick Up Girls in a Dungeon?: Arrow of the Orion premiered on February 15, 2019. The second season aired from July to September 2019. A third anime season and an OVA episode were both announced on September 27, 2019. The third season was slated to begin airing in July 2020, but was delayed due to the COVID-19 pandemic. The third season aired from October to December 2020. A fourth season aired from July 2022 to March 2023. A fifth season aired from October 2024 to March 2025. A sixth season has been announced.

Additionally, a spin-off light novel series titled Is It Wrong to Try to Pick Up Girls in a Dungeon? On the Side: Sword Oratoria began in January 2014, and another spin-off light novel series titled Is It Wrong to Try to Pick Up Girls in a Dungeon?: Familia Chronicle (illustrated by Nilitsu) began in March 2017. Both spinoffs have also received manga adaptations, and an anime television adaptation of Sword Oratoria aired from April to June 2017.

== Synopsis ==
=== Setting ===
The story takes place in the fictional city of Orario. The city is home to a number of Gods who, seeking excitement, chose to limit their divine powers in order to experience the hardships of those who reside on the mortal world. Each God maintains a retinue of adventurers and support personnel drawn from the people of the city known as a Familia (ファミリア, Famiria). The primary activity of these organizations is exploring the labyrinth under the city known as the Dungeon (ダンジョン, Danjon) in order to battle monsters and harvest the crystal shards they leave behind when destroyed. These shards are used to craft magic items and other treasures; however, they can also be exchanged directly for the world's currency. In a fashion typical of role playing games, the power of an adventurer is quantified by their level and a number of ability scores. By defeating more powerful monsters, an adventurer is able to increase their own level and ability scores, as well as unlock special powers known as skills.

=== Plot ===
The story follows the adventures of Bell Cranel, a 14-year-old rookie adventurer and sole member of the Hestia Familia. He looks up to Ais Wallenstein, a famous and powerful swordswoman of the Loki Familia, and vows to become as strong as her following a chance encounter where she saves his life from a powerful monster. He ends up unknowingly developing a special ability known as "Liaris Freese", granting him a rapid growth in strength as a result of his feelings. As Bell goes on adventures in his quest to become stronger, he ends up catching the attention of many others in the series, alongside the romantic affections of other girls, deities, and mortals alike, most notably Hestia herself, but he never reciprocates any of them whatsoever as he only has feelings for Ais.

== Media ==
=== Light novels ===
Fujino Ōmori wrote the story under the title Familia Myth as his entry for the 4th GA Bunko Award, where he won the Great Prize and received an offer for publication. The first light novel volume was published on January 15, 2013, by SB Creative under their GA Bunko imprint. As of October 11, 2025, twenty-one volumes have been published. The series has estimated sales of over 9 million copies as of January 2018. Yen Press has licensed the series in North America and released the first volume under the Yen On imprint in December 2014. The light novel ranked at No. 4 in 2014 in Takarajimasha's annual light novel guide book Kono Light Novel ga Sugoi!.

=== Manga ===
The series has been adapted into three manga series. One based on the novels was illustrated by Kunieda and started serialization in Square Enix's seinen manga magazine Young Gangan from August 2, 2013, before unexpectedly concluding in 2018. It has been collected in ten tankōbon volumes. A second season of the manga illustrated by Yamachi Taisei started in 2019. It has been collected in six tankōbon volumes. Yen Press announced at their New York Comic Con 2014 panel the rights to publish the manga in North America.

A four-panel manga series titled Is It Wrong to Try to Pick Up Girls in a Dungeon? 4-koma: Days of Goddess (ダンジョンに出会いを求めるのは間違っているだろうか4コマ【神様の日常】, Dungeon ni Deai o Motomeru no wa Machigatte Iru Darō ka 4-koma: Kamisama no Nichijō) by Masaya Takamura began serialization in Square Enix's online manga magazine Gangan Online from August 14, 2014.

Manga adaptations of the Familia Chronicle series "Episode Lyu" and "Episode Freya" and of Memoria Freese video game were also released.

A manga adaptation of the Astrea Record novels illustrated by Karu Yoneshiro is set to begin serialization in Square Enix' seinen manga magazine Monthly Big Gangan on May 25, 2026.

=== Anime ===
An anime television series adaptation by J.C.Staff began airing the broadcast night of April 3, 2015. The opening theme is "Hey World" by Yuka Iguchi, and the ending theme is "Right Light Rise" by Kanon Wakeshima. Crunchyroll had previously streamed the series internationally outside Asia. Sentai Filmworks has licensed the anime for digital and home video release in North America with an English dub released in March 2017. In Southeast Asia, the anime airs on Aniplus Asia. An original video animation was released on December 7, 2016.

A second season of the anime and an original film adaptation titled Is It Wrong to Try to Pick Up Girls in a Dungeon?: Arrow of the Orion (劇場版 ダンジョンに出会いを求めるのは間違っているだろうか ー オリオンの矢 ー, Danjon ni Deai o Motomeru no wa Machigatte Iru Darō ka ー Orion no Ya ー) were announced on February 18, 2018, during the GA Bunko 2018 Happyō Stage at Wonder Festival. The film was directed by Katsushi Sakurabi, written by Fujino Ōmori, with animation by J.C.Staff and music by Keiji Inai. The film was released on February 15, 2019, in Japan. The second season aired from July 13 to September 28, 2019. Hideki Tachibana replaced Yoshiki Yamakawa as the director of the second season. The rest of the cast and staff reprised their roles. The opening theme for the second season is "Hello to Dream" by Iguchi, and the ending theme is "Sayakana Shukusai" by Sora tob sakana. Hidive streamed a dubcast for the second season.

A third season of the anime series and an OVA episode were both announced on September 27, 2019. The second OVA episode was released on January 29, 2020. The third season was originally scheduled to start broadcasting in July 2020, but the anime production committee delayed the broadcast to "October or later" due to the effects of COVID-19. On July 4, 2020, it was announced that the third season was rescheduled to broadcast in October 2020. The third season aired from October 3 to December 19, 2020, and ran for 12 episodes. The opening theme for the third season is "Over and Over" by Iguchi, and the ending theme is "Evergreen" by Sajou no Hana. On December 18, 2020, a third OVA episode was announced, which was released on April 28, 2021.

A fourth season of the anime series was announced at GA FES 2021 on January 31, 2021. The main staff from previous seasons reprise their roles, while Fujino Ōmori, the original author, was supervised the scripts alongside Hideki Shirane. The fourth season premiered on July 23, 2022, and ended on October 1, 2022, running for 11 episodes. The first opening theme for the fourth season is "Tentō" by Sajou no Hana, and the first ending theme is "Guide" by Saori Hayami. It continued on January 7, 2023, and ended on March 18, 2023, with another 11 episodes, adding a total of 22 episodes. The second opening theme is "Shikō" by Saori Hayami, and the second ending theme is "Kirikizu" by Sajou no Hana.

A fifth season of the anime series was announced at an event celebrating the 10th anniversary of the original light novels on November 4, 2023. The main staff from previous seasons once again reprise their roles. It premiered on October 5, 2024. The opening theme for the fourth season is "Shōnen" by Gre4n Boyz, and the ending theme is "Hydrate" by Sajou no Hana.

A sixth season of the anime series was announced at Aedes Vesta event on February 7, 2026.

After the acquisition of Crunchyroll by Sony Pictures Television, the parent company of Funimation in 2021, the first 2 seasons of DanMachi, among several Sentai titles, was dropped from the Crunchyroll streaming service on March 31, 2022.

=== Video games ===
5pb. announced that they were developing a "dungeon action RPG" based on the light novels titled Is It Wrong to Try to Pick Up Girls in a Dungeon?: Infinite Combate or DanMachi: Infinite Combate, released on PlayStation 4, PlayStation Vita, Nintendo Switch, and Microsoft Windows on November 28, 2019. The PlayStation 4, Nintendo Switch, and PC versions were released in North America for August 11, 2020, and Europe for August 7, 2020.

Is It Wrong to Try to Pick Up Girls in a Dungeon?: Memoria Freese or DanMachi: Memoria Freese is a role-playing mobile game for the iOS and Android platforms, released in Japan on June 19, 2017, North America on March 30, 2018, and Europe in 2019. The game sold over 3 million copies in its first month, and has about 35 million registered users and more than 1 million subscribers as of March 2018. The game's earnings are 40% higher in the United States than in Japan. Yoshitsugu Matsuoka, the voice actor of Bell Cranell, was recognized as the Guinness World Record holder for "the largest number of lines performed by a single voice actor in a mobile game" with this game in June 2019. While the game contains many non-canon stories, it has also seen debuts of several major stories written by Fujino Ōmori himself, such as prequel stories Argonaut and Astrea Record, which have been credited with expanding the series mythology and world-building. Both of these stories would later be released as light novels. On December 27, 2023, Memoria Freese announced that all international services for the game would end by February 28, 2024.

An action role-playing mobile game titled Is It Wrong to Try to Pick Up Girls in a Dungeon? Battle Chronicle was announced in December 2022. It was originally planned for release on May 23, 2023, but was delayed to August 24.

An untitled mobile game developed by Neowiz and Gree Entertainment was announced in March 2023.

== Spin-off ==
Is It Wrong to Try to Pick Up Girls in a Dungeon? On the Side: Sword Oratoria (Japanese: ダンジョンに出会いを求めるのは間違っているだろうか外伝 ソード・オラトリア, Hepburn: Danjon ni Deai o Motomeru no wa Machigatte Iru Darō ka Gaiden: Sōdo Oratoria), or Sword Oratoria for short, is a Japanese light novel side story series, written by Fujino Ōmori and illustrated by Kiyotaka Haimura (based on the designs by Suzuhito Yasuda). The story focuses on the character Ais Wallenstein from the parent Is It Wrong to Try to Pick Up Girls in a Dungeon? series. As of February 05, 2026, sixteen volumes have been published. It has been adapted into a manga series and an anime television series.

== Reception ==
By June 2019, the overall print franchise had over 12 million copies in circulation.

By March 2024, the overall print franchise had over 17 million copies in circulation.

== See also ==
- Durarara!!, another light novel series illustrated by Suzuhito Yasuda
- Reborn as a Vending Machine, I Now Wander the Dungeon, the manga adaptation of which is also illustrated by Kunieda
- Yozakura Quartet, a manga series written and illustrated by Suzuhito Yasuda
