= Trinity Seven: Heavens Library & Crimson Lord =

2019 film by Hiroshi Nishikiori

- Kanji: 劇場版 トリニティセブン -天空図書館と真紅の魔王-
- Revised Hepburn: Gekijōban Toriniti Sebun: Tenkū Toshokan to Shinku no Maō
- Directed by: Hiroshi Nishikiori
- Screenplay by: Kenji Satō
- Based on: Trinity Seven by Kenji Satō and Akinari Nao
- Produced by: Ryō Hino; Miho Ichii; Aya Iizuka; Takema Okamura; Tomotaka Satō
- Starring: see below
- Cinematography: Mami Gotō
- Edited by: Kazuhiko Seki
- Music by: Technoboys Pulcraft Green-fund
- Production company: Seven Arcs
- Distributed by: Avex Pictures
- Release date: March 29, 2019
- Running time: 60 minutes
- Country: Japan
- Language: Japanese

Trinity Seven: Heavens Library & Crimson Lord (Note: Japanese: 劇場版 トリニティセブン -天空図書館と真紅の魔王-, Hepburn: Gekijōban Toriniti Sebun: Tenkū Toshokan to Shinku no Maō; lit. "Theatrical Feature Trinity Seven: Heavens Library & Crimson Lord") is a 2019 Japanese animated romantic comedy fantasy film directed by Hiroshi Nishikiori and written by Kenji Satō based on the Trinity Seven manga series, which Satō co-created with Akinari Nao. Produced by Seven Arcs and distributed by Avex Pictures, Heavens Library & Crimson Lord is the second film for the series, following The Eternal Library and the Alchemist Girl (2017), and it involves the Trinity Seven facing off against Lilith's own father. The film stars the voices of Yoshitsugu Matsuoka, Yumi Hara, Aya Uchida, Ayane Sakura, Rie Kugimiya, Yōko Hikasa, Nao Tōyama, Aya Suzaki, Tomoaki Maeno, and Shizuka Itō. Heavens Library & Crimson Lord was released in Japan on March 29, 2019.

Crunchyroll streamed the film outside of Japan first on the same day, and later on April 25, 2019.

== Synopsis ==
Arata, Lilith and the rest of the Trinity Seven to face off against the greatest enemy in the history of the Trinity Seven; the strongest Demon Lord, who also happens to be Lilith's own father. He challenges Arata to a battle, who is now a Demon Lord candidate.

== Voice cast ==
- Yoshitsugu Matsuoka as Arata Kasuga
- Yumi Hara as Lilith Asami
- Aya Uchida as Arin Kannazuki
- Ayane Sakura as Levi Kazama
- Rie Kugimiya as Sora
- Yōko Hikasa as Mira Yamana
- Nao Tōyama as Lieselotte Sherlock
- Aya Suzaki as Selina Sherlock
- Tomoaki Maeno as Abyss=Trinity
- Shizuka Itō as Judecca (Black Emperor Sword)

== Production ==
In July 2016, it was announced that a second anime film for the Trinity Seven was in development. The key staff and cast members from the anime television series and the 2017 film, The Eternal Library and the Alcehmis Girl reprised their respective roles: Hiroshi Nishikiori is directing the film at Seven Arcs, Kenji Satō, who co-created the series, returned to provide the screenplay, Shinpei Tomōka is designing the characters, and Technoboys Pulcraft Green-fund is providing the musical score. In February 2019, it was announced that Tomoaki Maeno and Shizuka Itō was cast as Abyss=Trinity and Judecca respectively, and the theme song, titled "Against the Abyss" provided by ZAQ.

== Release ==
The film was released in theaters in Japan on March 29, 2019. Crunchyroll first streamed the film outside of Japan the same day, and later on April 25, 2019.
