= Ayaka Suwa =

Japanese voice actress

- 諏訪 彩花
- Born: May 27, 1988 (age 38); Aichi Prefecture, Japan
- Education: Aichi Shukutoku University
- Occupation: Voice actress
- Agent: Arts Vision
- Notable work: Riddle Story of Devil as Tokaku Azuma; Trinity Seven as Hijiri Kasuga; Nier: Automata as A2; SSSS.Dynazenon as Mujina
- Spouse: Kotoba Inoya
- Children: 1

Ayaka Suwa (諏訪 彩花, Suwa Ayaka; born May 27, 1988) is a Japanese voice actress from Nagoya, Aichi Prefecture. She is represented by the agency Arts Vision.

== Early life ==
Suwa has loved watching anime since she was a child, and realized the joy of acting in a Musical theatre she did in elementary school. She first learned about voice acting when she fell in love with Ryoma Echizen from The Prince of Tennis in junior high school. Suwa was fascinated by the breadth of voice acting work, and after being involved in theater in high school and college, and with the encouragement of her friends, she decided to become a voice actor. Since there were not many training schools or vocational schools for voice actors in Nagoya, where she was born, she entered the Japan Narration Acting Institute, which had a school in Nagoya. She took lessons once a week while attending Aichi Shukutoku University. After working at the Japan Narration Acting Institute, she joined her current agency.

In January 2023, it was announced that Suwa had married Smile Down the Runway creator Kotoba Inoya. In late October 2024, she gave birth to a baby daughter.

== Filmography ==
=== TV anime ===
Year	Title	Role	Notes	Reference
2012	Code:Breaker	Tsubomi		
2012	Chousoku Henkei Gyrozetter	Saki Kono/Eraser Queen		
2013	Red Data Girl	Haruna Mita		
2013	Kin-iro Mosaic	Honoka Matsubara		
2013	Gingitsune	Saki Suzui		
2013	Yowamushi Pedal	Miki Kanzaki		
2013	Love Lab	Mika Kiriyama		
2014	Riddle Story of Devil	Tokaku Azuma		
2014	Captain Earth	Saori Sasaki		
2014	If Her Flag Breaks	Ruri Ninjabayashi		
2014	The Fruit of Grisaia	Yūji Kazami (young)	Protagonist	
2014	Jinsei	Ikumi Suzuki		
2014	Trinity Seven	Hijiri Kasuga	Main Characters	
2014	Nobunaga the Fool	Otama		
2014	The Kawai Complex Guide to Manors and Hostel Behavior	Miharu Tsuneda		
2014	The Irregular at Magic High School	Kazumi Takigawa		
2014	Yowamushi Pedal Grande Road	Miki Kanzaki		
2014	Log Horizon 2	Kyōko		
2015	Absolute Duo	Tomoe Tachibana		
2015	Assassination Classroom	Tōka Yada		
2015	Comet Lucifer	Otto Motō		
2015	Hello!! Kin-iro Mosaic	Honoka Matsubara		
2015	Lance N' Masques	Shirohime		
2015	Mikagura School Suite	Himi Yasaka		
2015	Miss Monochrome: The Animation 2	Akiko		
2015	Mobile Suit Gundam: Iron-Blooded Orphans	Mikazuki Augus (young)		
2015	Mysterious Joker	Haruka Oniyama		
2015	Pikaia!	Hana		
2015	The Asterisk War	Ayato Amagiri (young)	Protagonist	
2015	The Eden of Grisaia	Yūji Kazami (young)	Protagonist	
2015	The Labyrinth of Grisaia	Yūji Kazami (young)	Protagonist	
2015	Valkyrie Drive: Mermaid	Hibiki Kenjō		
2016	Active Raid	Yuyuko Shimazakura, Aju Tomigusuku, Kanna Miyoshi		
2016	Assassination Classroom 2nd Season	Tōka Yada		
2016	Keijo!!!!!!!!	Sachiko Yamikumo		
2016	KonoSuba	Chris, Eris		
2016	Lostorage incited WIXOSS	Aya Narumi		
2016	Matoi the Sacred Slayer	Matoi Sumeragi		
2016	Nyanbo!	Sabatora		
2016	Phantasy Star Online 2: The Animation	Rina Izumi		
2016	Please tell me! Galko-chan	Iinchō		
2016	Tanaka-kun Is Always Listless	Echizen		
2016	The Morose Mononokean	Mocha		
2016	WWW.Wagnaria!!	Yūta Shindō (young)		
2017	KonoSuba 2	Chris		
2017	Urara Meirocho	Saku Iroi		
2017	Yowamushi Pedal: New Generation	Miki Kanzaki		
2017	Twin Angel Break	Vail (ep. 1, 4–9)		
2017	Musekinin Galaxy Tylor	Dolly		
2017	Gamers!	Rena		
2017	Konohana Kitan	Natsume		
2017	Restaurant to Another World	Arte		
2017	Children of the Whales	Urumi, Nibi (young), Cocaro		
2018	Alice or Alice	Coco		
2018	My Sweet Tyrant	Non Katagiri		
2019	Boogiepop and Others	Naoko Kamikishiro		
2019	Fairy Gone	Clara Kisenaria		
2019	Isekai Quartet	Chris		
2019	Re:Stage! Dream Days♪	Ruka Ichijō		
2019	The Demon Girl Next Door	Sion Ogura		
2021	Gekidol	Izumi Hinazaki		
2021	SSSS.Dynazenon	Mujina		
2021	Duel Masters King!	Himiko		
2021	Let's Make a Mug Too	Yukari Ōsawa		
2021	Seirei Gensouki: Spirit Chronicles	Rio (young)	Protagonist	
2021	Bakugan: Geogan Rising	Jenny Hackett		
2022	Girls' Frontline	Negev		
2022	The Demon Girl Next Door Season 2	Sion Ogura		
2022	Prima Doll	Otome Okunomiya		
2022	Extreme Hearts	Sanae		
2022	I've Somehow Gotten Stronger When I Improved My Farm-Related Skills	Ruri		
2023	Is It Wrong to Try to Pick Up Girls in a Dungeon? IV	Lyra		
2023	Nier: Automata Ver1.1a	YoRHa Type A No. 2 (A2)		
2024	Highspeed Etoile	Liu Youran		
2025	Wandance	On Miyao		

=== Anime films ===
Year	Title	Role	Notes	Reference
2014	Yowamushi Pedal Re:RIDE	Miki Kanzaki		
2015	The Anthem of the Heart	Akemi Ishikawa		
2015	Yowamushi Pedal the Movie	Miki Kanzaki		
2016	Kin-iro Mosaic Pretty Days	Honoka Matsubara		
2016	Yowamushi Pedal: Spare Bike	Miki Kanzaki		
2017	Trinity Seven the Movie: The Eternal Library and the Alchemist Girl	Hijiri Kasuga		
2019	Trinity Seven: Heavens Library & Crimson Lord	Hijiri Kasuga		

=== Original video animation ===
Year	Title	Role	Notes	Reference
2013	Yowamushi Pedal Special Ride	Miki Kanzaki		
2014	If Her Flag Breaks	Ruri Ninjabayashi		
2014	Nozo × Kimi	Nozomi Komine		
2014	Riddle Story of Devil	Tokaku Azuma		
2015	Hozuki's Coolheadedness	Miki		
2015	Nozo × Kimi	Nozomi Komine		
2021	Alice in Deadly School	Kiriko Tōnuma		

=== Web anime ===
- Ninja Slayer From Animation (2015), Okayo - ep. 3
- Kaiju Girls (2016), Gomora/Mikazuki Kuroda
- Koro-sensei Q! (2016), Tōka Yada

=== Video Games ===
- The Idolmaster Million Live! (2013), Matsuri Tokugawa
- Nekomimi Survivor (2014), Fio
- Granblue Fantasy (2014), Tanya
- Fire Emblem Fates (2015), Elise
- Nier: Automata (2017), YoRHa Type A No. 2 (A2)
- Onmyōji (2017), Yuki-onna, Hotaru-gusa, Kyonshi-imouto, Kusa
- Fire Emblem Heroes (2017), Elise, Karla
- Girls' Frontline (2017), Negev
- Azur Lane (2017), HMS Arethusa
- Yuki Yuna is a Hero: Hanayui no Kirameki (2017), Utano Shiratori
- Dragalia Lost (2018), Alex
- Arknights (2019), Cuora, Manticore, Gavial
- King's Raid (2020), Xerah
- Touhou Spell Bubble (2020), Reimu Hakurei
- NieR Replicant ver.1.22474487139... (2020), Halua
- Onmyoji (2021), Semigoori Yuki-onna
- Counter:Side (2021), Miya
- Made in Abyss: Binary Star Falling into Darkness (2022), Tiare
- Octopath Traveler: Champions of the Continent (2022), YoRHa Type A No. 2 (A2)
- Fate/Grand Order (2015), Kukulkan
- Memento Mori (2022), Florence
- Love on Leave (2023), Amane Amakusa
- Wuthering Waves (2024), Shorekeeper
- Ex Astris (2024), Yan
- Zenless Zone Zero (2025), Ju Fufu
