= List of Trinity Seven chapters =

Trinity Seven is a fantasy romantic comedy manga series by Kenji Saitō with art by Akinari Nao. The series has been serialized in Fujimi Shobo's shōnen manga magazine Monthly Dragon Age since 2010. The first complied volume was released on July 7, 2011. On October 10, 2014, Yen Press announced at their New York Comic Con panel that they licensed Trinity Seven for release in North America, with the first volume releasing on May 19, 2015.

A spin-off manga written by Saito and illustrated by Sutarō Hanao, titled Trinity Seven: Levi Ninden (トリニティセブン レヴィ忍伝), launched in Dragon Age on November 9, 2015, and ended on December 9, 2016. Chako Abeno launched a second spin-off, titled Trinity Seven: Liese Chronicle (トリニティセブン リーゼクロニクル), in Dragon Age on February 9, 2017. The manga ended on June 9, 2018.

== Volume list ==
=== Trinity Seven ===
No.	Original release date	Original ISBN	English release date	English ISBN
1	July 7, 2011	978-4-04-712737-1	May 19, 2015	978-0-316-30221-0
1. "Cracker & Third Selection" (改竄者と第三の選択, Kaizan-sha to daisan no sentaku); 2. "Administer & a Ring" (魔王候補と一つの指輪, Maō kōho to hitotsu no yubiwa); 3. "Night Lesson & Prison Lock" (夜の課外授業と空間閉鎖, Yoru no kagai jugyō to kūkan heisa); 4. "Grimoire Security & Abort" (王立図書館検閲官と強制終了, Ōritsu toshokan ken'etsu-kan to kyōsei shūryō)
2	November 5, 2011	978-4-04-712760-9	August 18, 2015	978-0-316-26367-2
4. "Magus & Nil Magic" (魔道士と虚無魔法, Madōshi to kyomu mahō); 5. "Marine Time & Error Code" (大海原と不浄な魔力, Ōunabara to fujōna maryoku); 6. "Hot Spring & Alchemist" (露天風呂と錬金術師, Rotenburo to renkinjutsu-shi); 7. "Labyrinth & Ninja" (巨大迷宮と忍者, Kyodai meikyū to ninja); 8. "Macro Spell & Exciting" (術式詠唱と熱血戦闘, Jutsushiki eishō to nekketsu sentō)
3	April 5, 2012	978-4-04-712791-3	November 17, 2015	978-0-316-26368-9
9. "Magic Gunner & Shooting" (魔銃起動と一撃必殺, Ma jū kidō to ichigeki hikkoro); 10. "Gymnastics & Dream World" (体育授業と夢世界, Taīku jugyō to yume sekai); Extra. "Mission & Girls" (検閲任務と二人の少女, Kenetsu ninmu to futari no shōjo); 11. "Eternal Library & Criminal" (永劫図書舘と罪人, Eigō tosho yakata to tsumibito); 12. "Dark Mage & Sub-Administer" (悪の魔道士と第二の魔王候補, Aku no madōshi to daini no maō kōho)
4	September 6, 2012	978-4-04-712828-6	February 23, 2016	978-0-316-26369-6
13. "Top Security & Trickster" (主席検閲官と達人忍者, Shuseki kenetsu-kan to tatsujin ninja); 14. "Special Training & Big Event" (魔道特訓と学園襲撃, Madō tokkun to gakuen shūgeki); 15. "Paladin & Book of Astil" (大魔公と大魔道書, Dai ma kōto dai madōsho); 16. "Spell Succeed & Lost Technica" (意志継承と秘奥義, Ishi keishō to hi ōgi); 17. "Last Crest & Problem Solving" (魔道極法と異変解決, Madō kyoku-hō to ihen kaiketsu)
5	January 7, 2013	978-4-04-712851-4	May 24, 2016	978-0-316-26370-2
18. "Study & Holiday" (魔道勉強と安息日, Madō benkyō to ansokujitsu); 19. "Second Security & Dimension Trouble" (次席検閲官と空間転移, Jiseki ken'etsu-kan to kūkan ten'i); 20. "Ilias & Adventure" (新魔道書と学園探検, Shin madōsho to gakuen tanken); 21. "Bible Battle & Sweet Memory" (魔道書戦闘と過去記憶, Madōsho sentō to kako kioku); 22. "Critical & Demon Lord" (危険状態と魔王降臨, Kiken jōtai to maō kōrin)
6	May 9, 2013	978-4-04-712873-6	August 23, 2016	978-0-316-26371-9
23. "Game Master & Exodus" (支配者と空間脱出, Shihaisha to kūkan dasshutsu); 24. "Luminas & Satan's Rage" (聖女と憤怒の魔人, Seijo to fundo no majin); 25. "Fianna Knights & Invidia Magus" (光輝剣士と嫉妬魔道士, Kōki kenshi to shitto madōshi); 26. "Sagas Arms & Sisters" (神話武装と姉妹の絆, Shinwa busō to shimai no kizuna); 27. "Anastasia & Revenge Start" (復活魔道士と反撃開始, Fukkatsu madōshi to hangeki kaishi)
7	December 9, 2013	978-4-04-712964-1	November 15, 2016	978-0-316-26373-3
28. "Criminal Girl & His World" (聖戦少女と魔王世界, Seisen shōjo to maō sekai); 29. "Date & Talisman" (街道散策と魔道護符, Kaidō sansaku to madō gofu); 30. "Record Quest & Semiramis Garden" (調書任務と天空図書館, Chōsho ninmu to tenkū toshokan); 31. "Forbidden Element & Aeshma" (魔王因子と色欲魔王, Maō inshi to shikiyoku maō)
8	April 9, 2014	978-4-04-070079-3	February 21, 2017	978-0-316-26374-0
32. "Parallel Shift & Vanitas" (異次元同位体と虚無魔術, I jigen dōitai to kyomu majutsu); 33. "Spriggan & Guardian" (秘宝巫女と守護装置, Hihō miko to shugo sōchi); 34. "Impel Arm & Trinity Process" (黒の魔王兵器と第三契約, Kuro no maō heiki to dai san keiyaku); 35. "Judecca & World System" (黒皇魔剣と魔王の世界, Kokuō maken to maō no sekai)
9	August 9, 2014	978-4-04-070266-7	May 23, 2017	978-0-316-47076-6
36. "Aeshma & Malkuth" (紅の巫女と支配の王, Kurenai no miko to shihai no ō); 37. "Trinity Form & Server Down" (魔王装束と図書館崩壊, Maō shōzoku to toshokan hōkai); 38. "Manhunt & Eve of the Party" (鬼遊びと祭典準備, Oni asobi to saiten junbi); 39. "School Festival & Sticks" (魔道研究発表大祭と予感, Madō kenkyū happyō taisai to yokan)
10	November 8, 2014	978-4-04-070265-0	August 22, 2017	978-0-316-47078-0
40. "Valkyrie & Duel Start" (恋乙女と決闘開始, Koi otome to kettō kaishi); 41. "Fervent Girls & Thaumaturgist" (大魔道士たちと超魔道士たち, Dai madōshitachi to chō madōshitachi); 42. "Limit Release & Abyss Returner" (封印解除と奈落帰還者, Fūin kaijo to naraku kikansha); 43. "Forbidden Fruits & Top Quartet" (禁忌誘惑と頂上決戦, Kinki yūwaku to chōjō kessen)
11	March 25, 2015	978-4-04-070350-3	November 14, 2017	978-0-316-47079-7
44. "Offense Type & Pure Breed" (魔道武人と純魔道士, Madō bujin to jun madōshi); 45. "Luxuria Magus & Heaven's Gift" (宿命の魔道士と申し子, Shukumei no madōshi to mōshigo); 46. "Backstage & Chrono Gemini" (裏決戦と時空双子, Ura kessen to jikū futago); 47. "Logos Mystery & Lost Master" (数秘奥義と魔王強奪, Sū hi ōgi to maō gōdatsu); 48. "Saint Terminus & Demon Knight" (鉖焉聖女と魔王騎士, Seijo Tāminasu to maō kishi)
12	August 8, 2015	978-4-04-070351-0	March 6, 2018	978-0-316-47080-3
49. "United Front & Terminus Library" (共同戦線と終焉図書館, Kyōdō sensen to shūen toshokan); 50. "Arc Light & Soul Gemini" (魔公素質と相似存在, Ma kō soshitsu to sōji sonzai); 51. "Ruin Walker & Rage Walls" (聖儀魔術師と憤怒闘争, Hijiri Tadashi majutsu-shi to fundo tōsō); 52. "Lost Rune & Luxuria Girls" (崩壊秘術と色欲少女, Hōkai hijutsu to shikiyoku shōjo); 53. "Elemental Knight & Open Battle" (魔王騎士と激闘開始, Maō kishi to gekitō kaishi); 54. "Unlimited World & Theophania" (無限世界と顕現装束, Mugen sekai to kengen shōzoku)
13	January 9, 2016	978-4-04-070798-3	May 22, 2018	978-0-316-47081-0
55. "Aeshma Slave & Fourth Gate" (色欲の魔人と第四書庫, Shikiyoku no majin to dai shi shoko); 56. "Purely Emotion & Return King" (聖女の恋と魔王帰還, Seijo no koi to maō kikan); 57. "Primary Decide & Save the World" (魔王決定と聖女救出, Maō kettei to seijo kyūshutsu); 58. "Return of Saint & Confusion" (聖女帰還と愛の告白, Seijo kikan to ai no kokuhaku)
14	April 9, 2016	978-4-04-070799-0	August 21, 2018	978-0-316-47082-7
59. "Ready Champions & Fireworks" (決勝乙女と夜空散花, Kesshō otome to yozora sanka); 60. "Dante's Gate & Radix Grimore" (神曲門と起源魔書, Shinkyoku mon to kigen masho); 61. "Grimore Battle & Departure" (魔道死闘と魔道士旅立, Madō shitō to madōshi tabiritsu); 62. "Sword Magus & Dark Castle" (魔道剣聖と深奥魔城, Madō ken Sei to shin'ō majō)
15	August 9, 2016	978-4-04-070993-2	September 13, 2018	978-1-9753-2816-0
63. "Inferno World & Fragments Girl" (神曲世界と断章少女, Shinkyoku sekai to danshō shōjo); 64. "Twelve Demons & Death Point" (十二魔将と死神の間, Jūni mashō to shinigami no ma); 65. "Malebranche & Prisoner Girl" (第八階層と捕縛少女, Dai hachi kaisō to hobaku shōjo); 66. "Full Burst & Waterside" (激戦必至と水際少女, Gekisen hisshi to migiwa shōjo)
15.5	January 7, 2017	978-4-04-072144-6	February 19, 2019	978-1-9753-8295-7
Theme 1. "New Face & School Life" (新しい顔と学校生活, Atarashī kao to gakkō seikatsu) Theme 2. "Arin & Bridal Training" (アリンとブライダルトレーニング, Arin to Buraidaru Torēningu) Theme 3. "Swimming pool & Happening Time" (スイミングプールと出来事, Suimingu Pūru to dekigoto) Theme 4. "Shamanic Training & Shinobi Girl" (巫女調教としのび少女, Miko chōkyō to shinobi shōjo) Theme 5. "Dream Buster & Avaritia World" (ドリームバスターとアヴァリティアの世界, Dorīmu Basutā to Avaritia no sekai) Theme 6. "Night Rendezvous & Clock Sisters" (ナイトランデブー&クロックシスターズ, Naito Randebū & Kurokku Shisutāzu)
16	February 9, 2017	978-4-04-072178-1	May 28, 2019	978-1-9753-8298-8
67. Acedia Rave & Observer (意情麻人と時空観測者, I jō asa hito to jikū kansoku-sha); 68. High Level Girl & General Turn (高位魔道士と魔族将, Kōi madōshi to mazoku shō); 69. Void User & Witch Turn (虚無廣道士と魔女帰還, Kyomu hiromichi dōshi to majo kikan); 70. Hell Bathtime & Demon Talk (地獄風呂と悪魔談話, Jigoku furo to akuma danwa); 71. Anticross Eye & Sacred Tag (十字魔眼と聖女共闘, Jūji maganto seijo kyōtō)
17	August 8, 2017	978-4-04-072390-7	August 20, 2019	978-1-9753-8301-5
72. Three Six & Seven's Head (律猛魔道と獣王顕現, Ritsu mō madō to kemono-ō kengen); 73. Seventh City & Holiday Side (第七圏街と聖女決意, Dainana-ken machi to seijo ketsui); 74. Lost Magus & Alchemic Daughter (堕天魔道と錬金術娯, Daten madō to renkinjutsu bo); 75. Assault Attack & Discourage (進撃開始と真相開示, Shingeki kaishi to shinsō kaiji); 76. Plotter & Dictator (策士魔性と倣慢青年, Sakushi mashō to oma seinen)
18	February 9, 2018	978-4-04-072598-7	November 12, 2019	978-1-9753-8304-6
77. Paladins & Priestess Attack (大魔公と墨女参戦, Dai ma kōto sumi onna sansen); 78. Trinity Girls & Demon Clown (三人少女と道化魔人, San'nin shōjo to dōke majin); 79. Evolution & Devils' Battle (魔王魔力と魔将戦闘, Maō maryoku to mashō sentō); 80. King's Body & King's Force (魔王の体と魔王の魔力, Maō no karada to maō no maryoku); 81. Lord Reverse & Pure Thema (大魔王復活と純粋愛, Dai maō fukkatsu to junsui ai)
19	July 9, 2018	978-4-04-072780-6	February 25, 2020	978-1-9753-5876-1
82. Lucifer's Thema & Demon Sense (魔王の愛と魔王の情, Maō no ai to maō no jō); 83. Three Days & Grand Trial (三日猶予と英雄試練, Mikka yūyo to eiyū shiren); 84. Hero Sense & BeastKing (英雄才覚と十ニ魔将, Eiyū saikaku to jū ni mashō); 85. Demons Return & Loyalty Book (魔軍再生と忠義書物, Magun saisei to chūgi shomotsu); 86. Lightning Woman & Dimension Girl (光神少女と次元少女, Kōjin shōjo to jigen shōjo)
20	March 9, 2019	978-4-04-072780-6	May 26, 2020	978-1-9753-1041-7
87. Nostalgic Library & Dream Queen (望郷図書館と夢幻住人, Bōkyō toshokan to mugen jūnin); 88. Cardinal Crown & Eternal Dreamer (枢機魔公と夢幻の少女, Sūki ma kō to mugen no shōjo); 89. The Fugitive & The Advent (失腺者と英雄降臨, Shitsu-sen-sha to eiyū kōrin); 90. Demon Slayer & The Return Key (大魔王討伐者と帰還の鍵, Dai maō tōbatsu-sha to kikan no kagi); 91. Nostalgic Dreams & Lost Memory (郷愁淡夢と喪失記憶, Kyōshū awa yume to sōshitsu kioku)
21	August 9, 2019	978-4-04-073290-9	September 22, 2020	978-1-9753-1270-1
92. Demon Slays & The Return Key (魔将討伐と真言追求, Ma shō tōbatsu to shingon tsuikyū); 93. Final Fist & Return Kind (破邪の破拳と復活魔王, Haja no yabu ken to fukkatsu maō); 94. The King's Castle And The Absolute Monarch (魔王図書館と絶対王者, Maō toshokan to zettai ōja); 95. The Morning Star And The Fatal Struggle (真魔覚醒と最終大決戦, Shin kakusei to saishū daisakusen); 96. Zenith Summit & Singularity Point (頂上決戦と魔王特異点, Chōjō kessen to maō tokui-ten)
22	March 9, 2020	978-4-04-073570-2	January 19, 2021	978-1-9753-2014-0
97. Castle Break & Trinity (魔王城討伐と三位一体, Maō-jō tōbatsu to sanmiittai); 98. Heaven's Fallen & Twelve Demon Commanders (堕天王と十ニの魔将, Daten-ō to to ni no ma shō); 99. The Grandma Final & The Successor In The Empire (最終決着と黒皇の継承, Saishū ketchaku to kokuō no keishō); 100. Return Of The Demon Lord And Victory Banquet (魔王帰還と戦勝記念, Maō kikan to senshō kinen); 101. The lonely Shadow & School Life (孤独の影と学園新生活, Kodoku no kage to gakuen shin seikatsu); 102. Training Days And Elder Archive (日常訓練と喪失書庫, Nichijō kunren to sōshitsu shoko)
23	June 9, 2020	978-4-04-073686-0	June 29, 2021	978-1-9753-2404-9
103. Heaven's Angels & Calling Deep (天の裁定者と深淵の誘い, Ten no saitei-sha to shin'en isanai); 104. Highest Deep & God Bless (深闇の女神と天帝の剣, Miami no megami to tentei no ken); 105. Silent Day & Clouding Lady (静寂の日と聖枢の乙女, Seijaku no hi to sei kururu no otome); 106. Missing Memory & Girl's Precious (少女回想と少女終罵, Shōjo kaisō to shōjo shuba); 107. Artifact Memory & Noble Girl (神人想起と笑顔の少女, Shinjin sōki to egao no shōjo); 108. Heartbreak & Educational Policy (魔王の傷心と学園長の衿持, Maō no shōshin to gakuenchō no eri mochi)
24	October 9, 2020	978-4-04-073840-6	November 23, 2021	978-1-9753-2433-9
109. Battle of Extreme Light & Archpriest (光激戦闘と大聖職者, Hikari geki sentō to dai seishoku-sha); 110. The War for Hijri & Goddess's Identity (聖柵戦争と女神の正体, Seisaku sensō to megami no shōtai); 111. The Great Demon Lord's story & Heaven's World (大魔王物語と天空世界, Dai maō monogatari to tenkū sekai); 112. The Arbitrators & Demon Lord's Beloved (天の裁定者と魔王の奥方, Ten no saitei-sha to maō no okugata); 113. Demon Lord's Turning Point & Eternal Prison of Darkness (魔王の番と永獄の黒焔, Maō no ban to na goku no gokuen)
25	April 9, 2021	978-4-04-074053-9	May 24, 2022	978-1-9753-4147-3
114. Dis Catastrophe & Fate Goddess (破滅解放と運命の女神, Hametsu kaihō to unmei no megami); 115. Infinite Calculator & Titans Attack (無限計測と巨人襲来, Mugen keisoku to kyojin shūrai); 116. Senior Lord & Return of the Emperor (元大魔王と大魔王の帰還, Moto dai maō to dai maō no kikan); 117. Emperor's Relief & Arbitrator (大魔王の休息と裁定者の想い, Dai maō no kyūsoku to saitei-sha no omoi); 118. Master Memoria & Beginning Fight (憂畿の裁定者と死闘の開戦, Yūki no saitei-sha to shitō no kaisen)
26	October 8, 2021	978-4-04-074268-7	August 30, 2022	978-1-9753-4978-3
119. Luxuria Spring & Be Prepared (天界温泉と戦闘覚悟, Tenkai onsen to sentō kakugo); 120. Eden's Soldiers & Catastrophe War (天界軍勢と終末戦争, Tenkai gunzei to shūmatsu sensō); 121. Ultimate War & Divine Error (総力決戦と女神の消滅, Sōryoku kessen to megami no shōmetsu); 122. Giant Killing & Fort Rest (巨神討伐と魔道軍の休息, Kyoshin tōbatsu to madō-gun no kyūsoku); 123. Goddess Trap & Cloud Virus (神の買と聖樋の毒, Kami no-kai to sei hi no doku); 124. Road Plan & Ruin's Beginning (大魔王の策と破滅の始まり, Dai maō no saku to hametsu no hajimari)
27	April 8, 2022	978-4-04-074500-8	April 18, 2023	978-1-9753-6287-4
125. Game Set & Game Change (完全決着と再始動, Kanzen ketchaku to saishidō); 126. Restart & Newcomer (再接続と新教師, Sai setsuzoku to shin kyōshi); 127. Hard Menu & Build Up (猛特訓と基礎完成, Mō tokkun to kiso kansei); 128. Shadow Queen & Arch Knight (影の女神と四天の魔王騎士, Kage no megami to shiten no maō kishi); 129. Level Up Cancel & Make Advance (覚醒否定と神との対話, Kakusei hitei to kamito no taiwa); 130. Shadow Master & Impel Majesta (影の裁定神と支配の領域, Kage no saitei-shin to shihai no ryōiki)
28	October 7, 2022	978-4-04-074717-0	August 22, 2023	978-1-9753-7097-8
131. Shadow Revelation & Departure (影の支配と出発の時, Kage no shihai to shuppatsu no toki); 132. Ultimate Mother & Goddess Fortuna (最強の母と運命の時空, Saikyō no haha to unmei no jikū); 133. Alchemic Family & Stop World (錬金母子と時間停止世界, Renkin boshi to jikanteido sekai); 134. Evil Crocker & Release Cannon (時空邪神と解放の砲撃, Jikū jashin to kaihō no hōgeki); 135. Layer Build & Goddess of Air (錬成の術と時空神, Rensei no jutsu to jikūshin); 136. Ultimate Alchemic & Abies Shift (錬成奥義と生体複製, Rensei ōgi to seitai fukusei)
29	May 9, 2023	978-4-04-074956-3	May 21, 2024	978-1-9753-8054-0
137. Times Demigod & Return of Ruler (時空神と真打帰還, Jikūshin to Shinuchi kikan); 138. Affection Cannon & Arrival (愛情砲撃と魔王到着, Aijō hōgeki to maō tōchaku); 139. Blue Exodus & New Direction (蒼き解放と新たな航行先, Aoki kaihō to aratana kōkōsaki); 140. Invidia Archive & Storyteller (嫉妬書庫と語り部, Shitto shoko to goribu); 141. Ultimate Assassin & Infinite Mirage (達人忍者と無限分身, Tatsujin ninja to mugen bunshin); 142. Archive Librarian & Lord Equip (書庫司書と魔王装備, Shoko shisho to maō sōbi)
30	December 8, 2023	978-4-04-075243-3	October 15, 2024	979-8-8554-0197-4
143. Shizen sōsa to kitai no dai maō (自然操作と期待の大魔王); 144. Shizen ninja to kitai maō (自然忍者と期待魔王); 145. Shitto onsen to saikyō myōō (嫉妬温泉と最強明王); 146. Yūsha kengen to saikyō fusei (勇者顕現と最強父性); 147. Uragiri no kami to yoru no megami (裏切りの神と夜の女神); 148. Tenkai sensō to saikyō zōen (天界戦争と最強増援)
31	August 8, 2024	978-4-04-075548-9	November 25, 2025	979-8-8554-1905-4
149. Sakusen kaigi to mama no kage (作戦会議と真魔の影); 150. San'nin kenja to shinpan-sha (三人賢者と審判者); 151. Seigi yūei to kami no okite (正義英雄と神の掟); 152. Mugen no omo to kengen majin (夢幻の主と顕現魔神); 153. Shinwa sensō to ryūjin kengen (神話戦争と龍神顕現); 154. Yoru no dōwa to mugen yawa (夜の童話と夢幻夜話); 155. Kessen mae to saigo no o furo (決戦前と最後のお風呂)
32	March 7, 2025	978-4-04-075830-5	June 23, 2026	979-8-8554-2785-1
156. Megami no seigi to itsuwari no seigi (女神の正義と偽りの正義); 157. Hansha no madō to gōman no kakusei (反射の魔道と傲慢の覚醒); 158. Okite kami to han kami (掟神と反神); 159. Kami no shihai to kanojotachi no shihai (神の支配と彼女たちの支配); 160. Shōhai no megami to subete o kaesu mono (勝敗の女神と全てを返す者); 161. Kami no dōgu to kon'nan no tankyū-sha (神の道具と困難の探求者)
33	September 9, 2025	978-4-04-076076-6	November 24, 2026	979-8-8554-3853-6
162. Gainen sensō to kami no tekitai-sha (概念戦争と神の敵対者); 163. Megami rin'ne to taiko no yakusoku (女神輪廻と太古の約束); 164. Daten seiō to koi no kakushin (堕天聖王と恋の確信); 165. Yume no kesshū to koi no kataki (夢の結集と恋の敵); 166. Fukayami shūgeki to seigi maō (深闇襲撃と正義魔皇); 167. Seizō megami to megami hōshoku (聖象女神と女神飽食)
34	April 9, 2026	978-4-04-076341-5	—	—
168. Hijiri zō hakai to sekai madō (聖象破壊と世界魔道); 169. Kansoku-sha ryōiki to shinbutsu gongen (観測者領域と神仏権現); 170. Fuka kami no koigokoro to sei no shōchō (深神の恋心と聖の象徴); 171. Eiyū no kyōji to nana ma shūketsu (英雄の矜持と七魔集結); 172. Mirai e no hajimari to kako kara no owari (未来への始まりと過去からの終わり); 173. Bunrei-shin no wana to motodai maō no negai (分霊神の罠と元大魔王の願い)
35	November 9, 2026	978-4-04-076629-4	—	—
174. Mugen keisokusha-tachi to shitto no yūjō (無限計測者たちと嫉妬の友情); 175. Senpuku konton to shihō no shinpan-shin (潜伏混沌と司法の審判神); 176. Yaku no shinpan to tōsō no myōō (約の審判と逃走の明王); 177. Kamigami no kosei to kyoku-hō no yoake (神々の個性と極法の夜明け); 178. Sōsei mahō to shin'an sekai (創世魔法と深闇世界); 179. Tamashī no kaeru basho to shihai no sekai (魂の還る場所と支配の世界)

=== Trinity Seven: Levi Ninden ===
No.	Japanese release date	Japanese ISBN
1	April 9, 2016	978-4-04-070882-9
2	August 5, 2016	978-4-04-070994-9
3	February 9, 2017	978-4-04-072180-4

=== Trinity Seven: Liese Chronicle ===
No.	Japanese release date	Japanese ISBN
1	August 8, 2017	978-4-04-072389-1
2	February 9, 2018	978-4-04-072602-1
3	July 9, 2018	978-4-04-072774-5

=== Trinity Seven: Seven Days ===
No.	Japanese release date	Japanese ISBN
1	March 9, 2019	978-4-04-073092-9

=== Trinity Seven: RPG ===
No.	Japanese release date	Japanese ISBN
1	April 2, 2019	978-4-04-072994-7
