= Yoshitsugu Matsuoka =

Japanese voice actor (born 1986)

- 松岡 禎丞
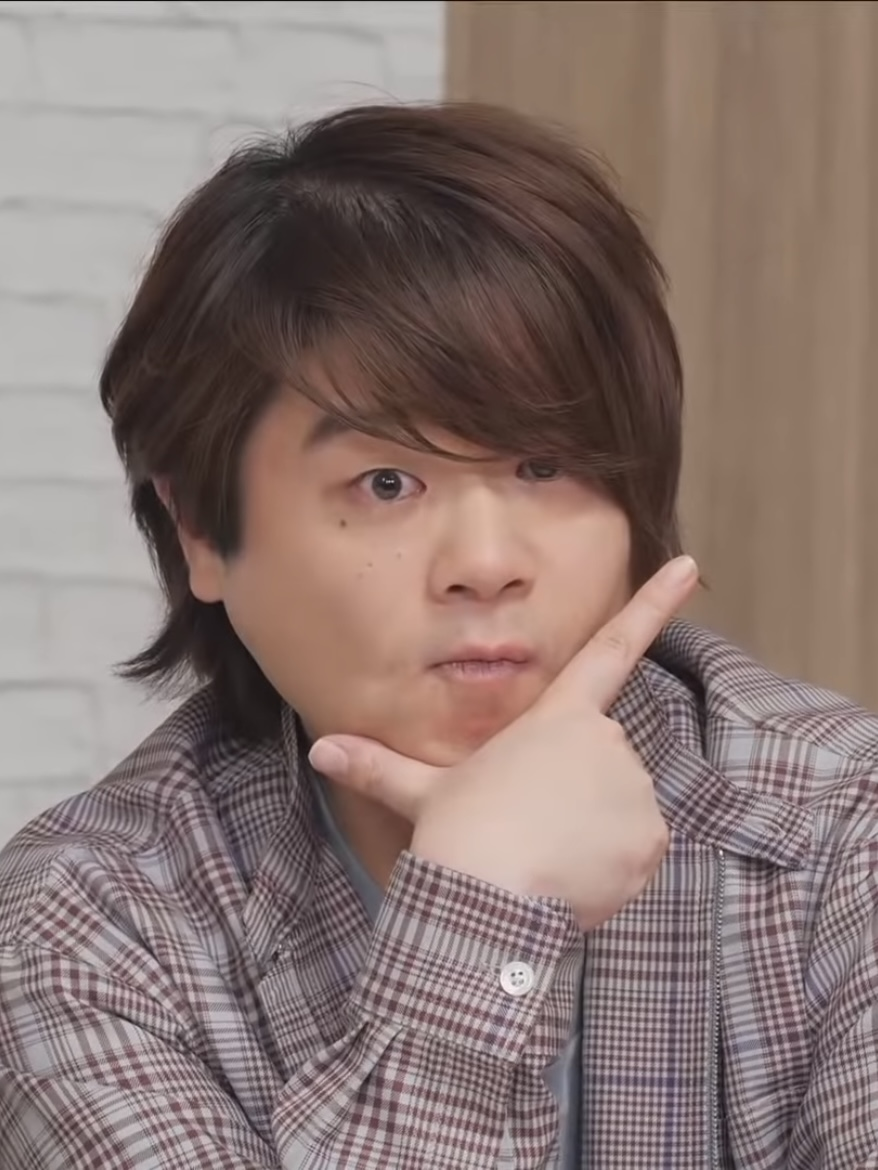
- Matsuoka in 2022
- Born: September 17, 1986 (age 40); Obihiro, Hokkaido, Japan
- Occupation: Voice actor
- Years active: 2009–present
- Agent: I'm Enterprise
- Notable work: Sword Art Online as Kirito/Kazuto Kirigaya; The Pet Girl of Sakurasou as Sorata Kanda; No Game No Life as Sora; Saekano as Tomoya Aki; Food Wars!: Shokugeki no Soma as Soma Yukihira; Is It Wrong to Try to Pick Up Girls in a Dungeon? as Bell Cranel; Re:Zero − Starting Life in Another World as Petelgeuse Romanée-Conti; Mob Psycho 100 as Teruki Hanazawa; Eromanga Sensei as Masamune Izumi; The Quintessential Quintuplets as Fūtarō Uesugi; Demon Slayer: Kimetsu no Yaiba as Inosuke Hashibira; Jujutsu Kaisen as Mechamaru Ultimate; Tokyo Revengers as Takashi Mitsuya; Lycoris Recoil as Majima; Blue Lock as Jingo Raichi; Trigun Stampede as Vash the Stampede; Gachiakuta as Zanka Nijiku; Cosmic Princess Kaguya! as Noi Komazawa; Star Detective Precure! as Nijee
- Height: 166 cm (5 ft 5 in)

Yoshitsugu Matsuoka (松岡 禎丞, Matsuoka Yoshitsugu; born September 17, 1986) is a Japanese voice actor from Hokkaido affiliated with the talent agency I'm Enterprise. He was honored at the 6th Seiyu Awards for Best New Actor in 2012 and the 10th Seiyu Awards for Best Lead Actor in 2016. As of June 17, 2019, he is the current official Guinness World Record holder for the most unique sound bites provided by a voice actor in a mobile game, exceeding 10,000 words in Is It Wrong to Try to Pick Up Girls in a Dungeon?: Memoria Freese.

== Biography ==
At the age of 15, Matsuoka was inspired by Akira Ishida's performance as Kaworu Nagisa in the anime series Neon Genesis Evangelion, which Matsuoka watched at the recommendation of a friend, and first learned about the voice acting profession.

While aspiring to become an auto mechanic in his senior year of high school, he searched for a voice actor school in Hokkaido, but went to Tokyo after receiving advice that it would be difficult to succeed without going to a school in the capital. After graduating from Yoyogi Animation Gakuin while working as a newspaper scholarship student, he joined the Japan Narration Actors Institute. After auditioning in 2009, Matsuoka became a member of I'm Enterprise agency. In the same year, he made his debut as AKX20000 in Eden of the East.

In 2011, he starred in the role of Narumi Fujishima in Heaven's Memo Pad for the first time, and won the Best Rookie Actors at the 6th Seiyu Awards in 2012.

In 2012, he voiced Kirito in Sword Art Online and reprised his role as of 2023.

At the 1st Aniradi Awards on March 21, 2015, he along with fellow radio personality Ai Kayano in "No Radio No Life; Gamer Brothers will start doing radio." won the "RADIO OF THE YEAR Best Radio Award" and the "BEST RETURN HOPE RADIO Revival Hope Radio Award."

In 2016, he won the Best Actor in a Leading Role at the 10th Seiyu Awards.

On June 17, 2019, he appeared on YouTube channel "Danmachi Fes 2019-TV Anime Danmachi II and Dan Memo 2nd Anniversary Is It Wrong to Have an Event Together? Special-Public Live Broadcast!!" where Guinness World Record certified him for the most unique sound bites provided by a voice actor, exceeding 10,000 words in Is It Wrong to Try to Pick Up Girls in a Dungeon?: Memoria Freese.

On October 2, 2021, as a collaboration project between the Sword Art Online Progressive: Aria of a Starless Night film and the Yomiuri Giants, he appeared in the Giants game with Hiroki Yasumoto, and became a pitcher for the opening ceremony. Matsuoka continued to collaborate during the match with a cap shuffle game with Yasumoto to liven up the venue.

== Filmography ==
=== Anime ===
Year	Title	Role	Notes	Source
2009	Eden of the East	AKX20000		7
2010	Mayoi Neko Overrun!	Student 3		
2010	Ōkami-san to Shichinin no Nakamatachi	Inuzuka, ardent fan C; Baseball team; student A		
2010	Oreimo	Kaede Makabe, male student		
2010	Battle Spirits Brave	Rugain, Operator#1		
2011	Anohana: The Flower We Saw That Day	Boy A, male student		
2011	Dream Eater Merry	Leader Cat, Student A		
2011	Hanasaku Iroha	Kirito Sakurai		
2011	Heaven's Memo Pad	Narumi Fujishima	Protagonist	
2011	Jewelpet Tinkle	Alpha		
2011	Mai no Mahō to Katei no Hi	Hikaru Tatsumi		
2011	Puella Magi Madoka Magica	Nakazawa		
2011	Ro-Kyu-Bu!	Kazunari Uehara		
2011	Sacred Seven	Fujimura		
2011	Sket Dance	Shinji (Image)	Ep. 42	
2011	Shakugan no Shana Final	François Auric		
2011	Duel Masters Victory	Jō Tarō		
2011	The Qwaser of Stigmata II	Leon Max Muller		
2011	The Idolmaster	Shouta Mitarai		
2011	Wandering Son	Riku Seya		
2011	Battle Spirits: Heroes	Gorou Amakusa, Koru, Student	Ep. 24, ep. 34, ep. 39	
2011	Chibi Devi!	Itsuki Takayama		
2011	Mobile Suit Gundam AGE	Delinquent	Ep. 16	
2012	Bakuman. 3	Takahashi (Classroom of Truth by Nanamine Tooru)		
2012	Black Rock Shooter	Taku Katsuchi		
2012	Bodacious Space Pirates	San-Daime		
2012	Tantei Opera Milky Holmes: Act 2	Abe-kun		
2012	Campione!	Godō Kusanagi	Protagonist	
2012	Upotte!!	Kohei D		
2012	AKB0048	Youth		
2012	High School DxD	Freed Sellzen		
2012	Medaka Box	Orchestra Club Member	Ep. 9	
2012	Lagrange: The Flower of Rin-ne	Array		
2012	Sword Art Online	Kirito/Kazuto Kirigaya	Protagonist	
2012	Tari Tari	Makoto Miyamoto		
2012	Lagrange: The Flower of Rin-ne 2	Array		
2012	The Pet Girl of Sakurasou	Sorata Kanda	Protagonist	
2012	Queen's Blade Rebellion	Taira	Ep. 1	
2012	Love, Elections & Chocolate	Yakumo's SP1		
2012	Chō Soku Henkei Gyrozetter	Shunsuke Hayami		
2012	JoJo's Bizarre Adventure	Boy A	Ep. 1	
2012	To Love-Ru Darkness	Male Student B (ep. 2), Nakajima		
2013	Oreimo	Kaede Makabe		
2013	Miyakawa-ke no Kūfuku	Kazuhiko Ōsawa		
2013	Makai Ouji: Devils and Realist	Sitri		
2013	Oreshura	Audience B	Ep. 13	
2013	High School DxD New	Freed Sellzen		
2013	Arata: The Legend	Arata		
2013	Magi: The Kingdom of Magic	Titus Alexius		
2013	Gargantia on the Verdurous Planet	Fleet Announcements C	Ep. 1	
2013	Nagi no Asukara	Shun Sayama		
2013	Teekyu 2	Member of Baseball Team		
2013	A Certain Scientific Railgun S	Furyō		
2013	Fantasista Doll	Kira Kazunari		
2013	Ro-Kyu-Bu! SS	Kazunari Uehara		
2013	Love Lab	Masaomi Ikezawa		
2013	Strike the Blood	Kira Lebedev Voltisloa		
2013	Ace of Diamond	Shinji Kanemaru		
2013	Gaist Crusher	Izuna		
2013	Yowamushi Pedal	Hajime Aoyagi		
2013	Sword Art Online: Extra Edition	Kirito/Kazuto Kirigaya	Protagonist	
2014	Ao Haru Ride	Tōma Kikuchi		
2014	Blade & Soul	Shou		
2014	Buddy Complex	Aoba Watase	Protagonist	
2014	Mahouka Koukou no Rettousei	Masaki Ichijō	Main cast	
2014	The Comic Artist and His Assistants	Yūki Aito	Protagonist	
2014	M3: Sono Kuroki Hagane	Akashi Saginuma	Protagonist	
2014	No Game No Life	Sora	Protagonist	
2014	Nobunaga the Fool	Magellan		
2014	Sword Art Online II	Kirito/Kazuto Kirigaya	Protagonist	
2014	Seirei Tsukai no Blade Dance	Jio Inzagi		
2014	Akame ga Kill!	Lubbock	Main cast	
2014	Buddy Complex Kanketsu-hen: Ano Sora ni Kaeru Mirai de	Aoba Watase	Protagonist	
2014	Denkigai no Honya-san	Kantoku	Main cast	
2014	Shirobako	Tatsuya Ochiai		
2014	Yowamushi Pedal Grande Road	Hajime Aoyagi		
2014	Trinity Seven	Arata Kasuga/Astral Trinity	Protagonist	
2014	Ōkami Shōjo to Kuro Ōji	Nozomi Kamiya		
2015	Absolute Duo	Tōru Kokonoe	Protagonist	
2015	Ace of Diamond: 2nd Season	Shinji Kanemaru		
2015	Aoharu x Machinegun	Tohru Yukimura	Main cast	
2015	Cute High Earth Defense Club LOVE!	Shō Komi	Ep. 8	
2015	Food Wars!: Shokugeki no Soma	Sōma Yukihira	Protagonist	
2015	Fate/kaleid liner Prisma Illya 2wei Herz!	Reiichi Gakumazawa		
2015	High School DxD BorN	Freed Sellzen		
2015	Is It Wrong to Try to Pick Up Girls in a Dungeon?	Bell Cranel	Protagonist	
2015	Makura no Danshi	Yū Maiki		
2015	Mikagura School Suite	Bimii		
2015	Rakudai Kishi no Cavalry	Shizuya Kirihara		
2015	Saekano: How to Raise a Boring Girlfriend	Tomoya Aki	Protagonist	
2015	Star-Myu: High School Star Musical	Akira Ugawa		
2015	Sky Wizards Academy	Kanata Age	Protagonist	
2015	Tsubasa to Hotaru	Aki Hidaka	Protagonist	
2015	To Love-Ru Darkness 2nd	Nakajima		
2015	Ultimate Otaku Teacher	Jō Odawara	Ep. 18	
2015	Unlimited Fafnir	Yū Mononobe	Protagonist	
2015	Working!!!	Izumi's editor		
2015	Young Black Jack	Tamura		
2016	Dimension W	Koorogi		
2016	Days	Jin Kazama	Main cast	
2016	Food Wars! Shokugeki no Soma: The Second Plate	Sōma Yukihira	Protagonist	
2016	Kiss Him, Not Me	Hayato Shinomiya		
2016	Luck & Logic	Orga Brakechild		
2016	Mob Psycho 100	Teruki Hanazawa, Hikaru Tokugawa	Main cast	
2016	Nijiiro Days	Natsuki Hashiba	Protagonist	
2016	Please Tell Me! Galko-chan	Otao		
2016	Prince of Stride Alternative	Kei Kamoda, Tetsu Hachiya		
2016	Mysterious Joker	Phoenix		
2016	Re:Zero − Starting Life in Another World	Petelgeuse Romanée-Conti		
2016	Rin-ne Season 2	Oboro		
2016	Seisen Cerberus	Hiiro	Protagonist	
2016	Servamp	Belkia		
2016	Super Lovers	Aki Kaidou		
2016	The Disastrous Life of Saiki K.	Anpu		
2016	Undefeated Bahamut Chronicle	Harem Bay		
2016	Twin Star Exorcists	Momochi and Chijiwa	Ep. 26	
2016	Girlish Number	Jūzou Matsuoka		
2017	My Hero Academia	Yosetsu Awase		
2017	Eromanga Sensei	Masamune Izumi, Kirito (ep. 8)	Protagonist	
2017	Sword Oratoria	Bell Cranel		
2017	ēlDLIVE	Taklamakan Strange Love		
2017	Chaos;Child	Takuru Miyashiro	Protagonist	
2017	Saekano: How to Raise a Boring Girlfriend ♭	Tomoya Aki	Protagonist	
2017	ClassicaLoid	Richard Wagner		
2017	Food Wars! Shokugeki no Soma: The Third Plate	Sōma Yukihira	Protagonist	
2017	King's Game: The Animation	Toshiyuki Abe		
2017	Star-Myu: High School Star Musical 2	Akira Ugawa		
2017	Hitorijime My Hero	Kensuke Ōshiba		
2017	Garo: Vanishing Line	Nero, Bezel	Ep. 3, ep. 15	
2018	Hakata Tonkotsu Ramens	Yamato		
2018	Record of Grancrest War	Moreno Dortous		
2018	Bakumatsu	Izou Okada		
2018	100 Sleeping Princes and the Kingdom of Dreams	Chrono		
2018	The Disastrous Life of Saiki K. 2	Anpu		
2018	Sanrio Boys	Subaru Amagaya		
2018	A Place Further than the Universe	Toshio Zaizen		
2018	Gundam Build Divers	Do-ji		
2018	Food Wars! Shokugeki no Soma: The Third Plate - Tootsuki Ressha-hen	Sōma Yukihira	Protagonist	
2018	Devils' Line	Yūki Anzai	Protagonist	
2018	Alice or Alice	Older Brother	Main cast	
2018	Free! Dive to the Future	Shizuru Isurugi		
2018	Xuan Yuan Sword Luminary	Pu Zhao		
2018	Sword Art Online: Alicization	Kirito/Kazuto Kirigaya	Protagonist	
2018	Goblin Slayer	Spearman		
2019	Mob Psycho 100 II	Teruki Hanazawa	Main cast	
2019	The Rising of the Shield Hero	Ren Amaki		
2019	The Quintessential Quintuplets	Fūtarō Uesugi	Protagonist	
2019	Demon Slayer: Kimetsu no Yaiba	Inosuke Hashibira	Main cast	
2019	Afterlost	Yoshiaki		
2019	Star-Myu: High School Star Musical 3	Akira Ugawa		
2019	Bakumatsu Crisis	Izou Okada		
2019	Kengan Ashura	Raian Kure		
2019	Is It Wrong to Try to Pick Up Girls in a Dungeon? II	Bell Cranel	Protagonist	
2019	The Case Files of Lord El-Melloi II: Rail Zeppelin Grace Note	Flat Escardos		
2019	Cannon Busters	Philly the Kid	Protagonist	
2019	Special 7: Special Crime Investigation Unit	Mysterious Man		
2019	Stars Align	Itsuki Ameno		
2019	The Price of Smiles	Joshua Ingram	Main cast	
2019	Food Wars! Shokugeki no Soma: The Fourth Plate	Sōma Yukihira	Protagonist	
2019	Sword Art Online: Alicization - War of Underworld	Kirito/Kazuto Kirigaya	Protagonist	
2019	Fire Force	Yona		
2019	Ahiru no Sora	Hyou Fuwa		
2019	Ace of Diamond act II	Shinji Kanemaru		
2020	Darwin's Game	Wang	Main cast	
2020	Hatena Illusion	Makoto Shiranui	Protagonist	
2020	Infinite Dendrogram	Mr. Franklin	Main cast	
2020	Jujutsu Kaisen	Mechamaru Ultimate / Kokichi Muta		
2020	The Millionaire Detective Balance: Unlimited	Akira Mita		
2020	My Next Life as a Villainess: All Routes Lead to Doom!	Nicol Ascart		
2020	Food Wars! Shokugeki no Souma: The Fifth Plate	Souma Yukihira	Protagonist	
2020	Super HxEros	Retto Enjō	Protagonist	
2020	Is It Wrong to Try to Pick Up Girls in a Dungeon? III	Bell Cranel	Protagonist	
2020	Sleepy Princess in the Demon Castle	Demon King Tasogare	Main cast	
2020	Yu-Gi-Oh! Sevens	Nail Saionji	Main cast	
2021	The Quintessential Quintuplets 2nd Season	Fūtarō Uesugi	Protagonist	
2021	I-Chu: Halfway Through the Idol	Hikaru Orihara		
2021	Full Dive	Sōichiro Kamui		
2021	Tokyo Revengers	Takashi Mitsuya		
2021	Osamake	Sueharu Maru	Protagonist	
2021	Record of Ragnarok	Loki		
2021	My Next Life as a Villainess: All Routes Lead to Doom! X	Nicol Ascart		
2021	Re-Main	Norimichi Ishikawa		
2021	The Detective Is Already Dead	Kōmori		
2021	Seirei Gensouki: Spirit Chronicles	Rio/Haruto Amakawa	Protagonist	
2021	D_Cide Traumerei the Animation	Yoshichika Murase		
2021	Pokémon Master Journeys: The Series	Raihan	Replaced Tatsuhisa Suzuki	
2021	The Vampire Dies in No Time	Tо̄ Handa		
2021	Demon Slayer: Kimetsu no Yaiba – Entertainment District Arc	Inosuke Hashibira	Main cast	
2022	Sasaki and Miyano	Taiga Hirano		
2022	Chiikawa	Ramen no Yoroi-san		
2022	Deaimon	Tomoe Yukihira		
2022	The Rising of the Shield Hero 2	Ren Amaki		
2022	Heroines Run the Show	Kōdai Yamamoto		
2022	A Couple of Cuckoos	Shion Asuma		
2022	Lucifer and the Biscuit Hammer	Hyō Shimaki		
2022	Overlord IV	Philip Dayton L'Eyre Montserrat		
2022	Lycoris Recoil	Majima		
2022	Is It Wrong to Try to Pick Up Girls in a Dungeon? IV	Bell Cranel	Protagonist	
2022	The Eminence in Shadow	Hyoro Gari	also season 2 in 2023	
2022	Mob Psycho 100 III	Teruki Hanazawa	Main cast	
2022	Blue Lock	Jingo Raichi		
2022	Bleach: Thousand-Year Blood War	Äs Nödt		
2023	Tomo-chan Is a Girl!	Tatsumi Tanabe		
2023	Is It Wrong to Try to Pick Up Girls in a Dungeon? IV Part 2	Bell Cranel	Protagonist	
2023	The Reincarnation of the Strongest Exorcist in Another World	Kairu		
2023	Trigun Stampede	Vash the Stampede	Protagonist	
2023	Tokyo Revengers Season 2	Takashi Mitsuya		
2023	Handyman Saitō in Another World	Cains		
2023	The Tale of the Outcasts	Citri		
2023	Demon Slayer: Kimetsu no Yaiba – Swordsmith Village Arc	Inosuke Hashibira	Main cast	
2023	I Got a Cheat Skill in Another World and Became Unrivaled in the Real World, Too	Yūya Tenjō	Protagonist	
2023	Chibi Godzilla Raids Again	Chibi Mecha Godzilla		
2023	Bleach: Thousand-Year Blood War Separation Arc	Äs Nödt		
2023	Level 1 Demon Lord and One Room Hero	Fred		
2023	Helck	Azudora		
2023	Captain Tsubasa: Junior Youth Arc	Juan Diaz		
2023	Jujutsu Kaisen Season 2	Mechamaru / Kokichi Muta		
2023	The Rising of the Shield Hero Season 3	Ren Amaki		
2023	Butareba: The Story of a Man Turned into a Pig	Pig	Protagonist	
2023	Tearmoon Empire	Abel Remno		
2023	Goblin Slayer II	Spearman		
2023	Protocol: Rain	Mutsuki Naitō		
2023	Dark Gathering	Old Old F Tunnel Spirit	Ep. 14-15	
2023	Ron Kamonohashi's Forbidden Deductions	Mylo Moriarty		
2024	Hokkaido Gals Are Super Adorable!	Takayumi Matsuo		
2024	Shaman King: Flowers	Yohsuke Kamogawa		
2024	Mission: Yozakura Family	Kengo Yozakura, Goliath		
2024	Chibi Godzilla Raids Again Season 2	Chibi Mechagodzilla		
2024	Demon Slayer: Kimetsu no Yaiba – Hashira Training Arc	Inosuke Hashibira	Main cast	
2024	That Time I Got Reincarnated as a Slime Season 3	Masayuki Honjou		
2024	Twilight Out of Focus	Mao Tsuchiya	Protagonist	
2024	Sengoku Youko	Mudo		
2024	No Longer Allowed in Another World	Kōtarō		
2024	Quality Assurance in Another World	Alba		
2024	Fate/strange Fake	Flat Escardos		
2024	Is It Wrong to Try to Pick Up Girls in a Dungeon? V	Bell Cranel	Protagonist	
2025	Miru: Paths to My Future	Sanders		
2025	Witch Watch	Tenryū Kiyomiya		
2025	#Compass 2.0: Combat Providence Analysis System	Adam Yuriev		
2025	Teogonia	Orha		
2025	Gachiakuta	Zanka Nijiku		
2025	Reborn as a Vending Machine, I Now Wander the Dungeon Season 2	Hevee		
2025	See You Tomorrow at the Food Court	Takizawa		
2025	To Be Hero X	Little Johnny		
2025	A Wild Last Boss Appeared!	Jupiter		
2025	Monster Strike: Deadverse Reloaded	Jugemu		
2026	High School! Kimengumi	Kiyoshi Shusse		
2026	Sentenced to Be a Hero	Tatsuya		
2026	Star Detective Precure!	Nijee		
2026	The World's Strongest Rearguard	Arihito		
2026	The Insipid Prince's Furtive Grab for the Throne	Traugott Lakes Adler		
2026	Magic Knight Rayearth	Ferio		

=== Films ===
Year	Title	Role	Source
2014	Bodacious Space Pirates: Abyss of Hyperspace	San-Daime	
2014	The Idolmaster Movie	Shōta Mitarai	
2016	Suki ni Naru Sono Shunkan o	Kōdai Yamamoto	
2016	Monster Strike The Movie	Sōta Ishibashi	
2017	Trinity Seven the Movie: The Eternal Library and the Alchemist Girl	Arata Kasuga	
2017	Sword Art Online The Movie: Ordinal Scale	Kirito/Kazuto Kirigaya	
2017	No Game No Life: Zero	Riku	
2019	Is It Wrong to Try to Pick Up Girls in a Dungeon?: Arrow of the Orion	Bell Cranell	
2019	Trinity Seven: Heavens Library & Crimson Lord	Arata Kasuga	
2019	Kimi dake ni Motetainda	Aki Sahashi	
2019	Saekano the Movie: Finale	Tomoya Aki	
2020	Goblin Slayer: Goblin's Crown	Spearman	
2020	Shirobako Movie	Tatsuya Ochiai	
2020	The Stranger by the Shore	Mio Chibana	
2020	Demon Slayer: Kimetsu no Yaiba – The Movie: Mugen Train	Inosuke Hashibira	
2021	Pretty Guardian Sailor Moon Eternal The Movie	Helios/Pegasus	
2021	Sword Art Online Progressive: Aria of a Starless Night	Kirito/Kazuto Kirigaya	
2021	Jujutsu Kaisen 0	Mechamaru/Kokichi Muta	
2022	The Quintessential Quintuplets Movie	Fūtarō Uesugi	
2022	Sword Art Online Progressive: Scherzo of Deep Night	Kirito/Kazuto Kirigaya	
2023	Sasaki and Miyano: Graduation	Taiga Hirano	
2023	Fate/strange Fake: Whispers of Dawn	Flat Escardos	
2023	My Next Life as a Villainess: All Routes Lead to Doom! The Movie	Nicol Ascart	
2023	Demon Slayer: Kimetsu no Yaiba – To the Swordsmith Village	Inosuke Hashibira	
2024	Mobile Suit Gundam SEED Freedom	Daniel Harper	
2024	Code Geass: Rozé of the Recapture	Yukiya Naruse	
2024	Detective Conan: The Million Dollar Pentagram	Hijiri Fukushiro	
2025	Cute High Earth Defense Club Eternal Love!	Maasa Shirahone	
2025	Demon Slayer: Kimetsu no Yaiba – The Movie: Infinity Castle	Inosuke Hashibira	
2026	Cosmic Princess Kaguya!	Noi Komazawa	
2026	To You in the Beyond	Yoshiki Suga	
2028	Sword Art Online the Movie: Integral Domain	Kirito/Kazuto Kirigaya	

=== Video games ===
- Grand Chase Dimensional Chaser Global as Lass Isolet
- Final Fantasy XIV: Endwalker as Fandaniel/Amon/Hermes
- Tales of Arise as Law
- Granblue Fantasy as Chat Noir, Baldr
- Dream Meister and the Recollected Black Fairy as Itsuki
- Sword Art Online: Infinity Moment as Kirito/Kazuto Kirigaya
- Shiratsuyu no Kai as Tsukamoto Ryouta
- Glass Heart Princess as Doumyouji Gai
- Glass Heart Princess : Platinum as Doumyouji Gai
- Phantasy Star Nova as Seil
- Under Night In-Birth as Chaos
- Octopath Traveler as Therion
- Sword Art Online: Hollow Fragment as Kirito/Kazuto Kirigaya
- Dengeki Bunko: Fighting Climax as Kirito/Kazuto Kirigaya
- Tears to Tiara 2 as Hamil
- Mahouka Koukou no Rettousei: Out of Order as Masaki Ichijō
- Mugen Souls Z as Ace
- Chaos;Child as Takuru Miyashiro
- Digimon Story: Cyber Sleuth as Male Protagonist
- Chaos Rings III as Male Protagonist
- Sword Art Online: Lost Song as Kirito/Kazuto Kirigaya
- Sword Art Online: Hollow Realization as Kirito/Kazuto Kirigaya
- Sword Art Online: Memory Defrag as Kirito/Kazuto Kirigaya, himself (live action)
- Accel World vs. Sword Art Online: Millennium Twilight as Kirito/Kazuto Kirigaya, Graphite Edge (uncredited)
- Sword Art Online: Fatal Bullet as Kirito/Kazuto Kirigaya
- Sword Art Online: Integral Factor as Kirito/Kazuto Kirigaya
- I-Chu as Hikaru Orihara
- Nights of Azure as Professor Alucard
- Fairy Fencer F as Zenke
- Otogi: Spirit Agents as Hijiri
- The Alchemist Code as Reimei
- Dragalia Lost as Hope, Emile (uncredited)
- Brown Dust as Seto
- Fire Emblem Heroes as Hrid
- The Idolmaster SideM as Shouta Mitarai
- Our World is Ended as Iruka No. 2
- Extraordinary One as Garuda
- Is It Wrong to Try to Pick Up Girls in a Dungeon?: MEMORIA FREESE as Bell Cranel, Argonaut, and Erebus
- Arena of Valor as Lu Bu (Japanese Server), Kirito (SAO Skin) & Inosuke Hashibira (KNY Skin)
- Arknights as Arene
- Atelier Lulua: The Scion of Arland as Nicodemus David Dieter
- Onmyoji as Koroka
- Punishing: Gray Raven as Lee
- Namu Amida Butsu! -UTENA- as Yakushi Nyorai
- Genshin Impact as Xiao
- Cookie Run: Kingdom as Herb Cookie
- Sword Art Online: Alicization Lycoris as Kirito/Kazuto Kirigaya
- A Certain Magical Index: Imaginary Fest as Kakeru Kamisato
- Captain Tsubasa: Rise of New Champions as Juan Díaz
- Captain Tsubasa: Dream Team as Tomeya Akai
- Rune Factory 5 as Lyka
- Pokémon Masters EX as Ingo
- Alchemy Stars as Sylva
- Sword Art Online: Last Recollection as Kirito/Kazuto Kirigaya
- Master Detective Archives: Rain Code as Yomi Hellsmile
- Panic in Sweets Land as Evil King
- Project Sekai: Colorful Stage! feat. Hatsune Miku as Reki Bakuno
- Neverness to Everness as Exe

=== Original net animation (ONA) ===
- Oblivion Battery (2020) as Junpei Chihaya
- The Way of the Househusband (2021) as Pet Cat
- Bastard!! -Heavy Metal, Dark Fantasy- (2022) as Lars Ul Metallicana
- Gaiken Shijō Shugi (2022) as Keisuke Hasegawa
- Gamera Rebirth (2023) as Joe

=== Original video animation (OVA) ===
- Code Geass: Akito the Exiled as Yukiya Naruse
- The Comic Artist and His Assistants as Yūki Aito
- Hori-san to Miyamura-kun as Izumi Miyamura
- Hybrid Child as Tsukishima
- Star-Myu: High School Star Musical as Akira Ugawa

=== Drama CDs ===
- Gal☆Gun as Motesugi Tenzou
- Senaka Awase no Koi as Nikaido Fumito
- Hitorijime Boyfriend as Ohshiba Kensuke
- Bathroom Yori Ai o Komete 2 as Ogura Tomohiko
- Brother Shuffle! as Hajime
- Gosan no Heart as Miki Toshihisa
- Megumi to Tsugumi as Yamada Tsugumi
- Tamayura as Asakura Michitada
- Shuuen no Shiori Project -Shuuen Re:act- (終焉-Re:act-) as E-ki
- Yoru to Asa no Uta as Asaichi
- Kono Ore ga Omae Nanka Suki na Wakenai as Taisei Fujima
- Smells Like Green Spirit as Futoshi Mishima
- Requiem of the Rose King (2016, 2017) as Prince Edward
- Kakkou no Yume (2018) as Yuuzi Seno
- Seirei Gensouki as Rio (Amakawa Haruto)
- L'étranger series as Mio Chibana
- Mo Dao Zu Shi (2020) as Nie HuaiSang/Jou Kaisou
- Tashiro-kun, Kimi tte Yatsu Wa. (2021) as Yuuta Ebihara
- Tearmoon Empire (2022, 2023) as Abel Remno

=== Voice-over comics ===
- Nisekoi as Raku Ichijō

=== Live action ===
- Voice II (2021) as Hentai Belt (voice)
- Kamen Rider Geats (2022) as the Vision Driver, Laser Raise Riser, Zillion Driver, Dooms Geats, and Suel (voice)

=== Dubbing ===
- Christine (2019 4K Ultra HD edition) as Arnold "Arnie" Cunningham (Keith Gordon)
- Gran Turismo as Jann Mardenborough (Archie Madekwe)
- Hard Hit as Jin-woo (Ji Chang-wook)
- The Hurricane Heist as Will Rutledge (Toby Kebbell)
- Kingdom of the Planet of the Apes as Noa (Owen Teague)
- Lookism as Park Hyung Seok/Keisuke Hasegawa
- Mechamato as MechaBot
- Ready Player One as Sho (Philip Zhao)
