= Smells Like Green Spirit =

2011 manga series

- Cover of the first manga volume, featuring Mishima and Kirino.

スメルズライクグリーンスピリット (Sumeruzu Raiku Gurīn Supiritto)
- Genre: Drama, Romance, Slice of life, Yaoi
- Manga
- Written by: Saburō Nagai
- Published by: Fusion Product
- Magazine: Comic Be
- Original run: August 12, 2011 – February 13, 2013
- Volumes: 2

Smells Like Green Spirit (Japanese: スメルズライクグリーンスピリット, Hepburn: Sumeruzu Raiku Gurīn Supiritto) is a Japanese manga series written and illustrated by Saburō Nagai, serialized in Fusion Product's Comic Be between 2011 and 2013. The series has been collected in two tankōbon volumes. A series of two Drama CDs have also been released.

== Plot ==
Futoshi Mishima, a student at a high school in the countryside, is bullied by his classmates. The reason is that he is seemingly gay. In reality, Mishima does like guys so he does not resist their bullying, and instead, finds solace in secretly cross-dressing. One day on the rooftop of the school, Mishima finds the lipstick he had lost before in the hands of Makoto Kirino, one of the bullies. Kirino was about to put on the lipstick that Mishima used on his own lips. This is the story of these two young boys looking for a place they can really be themselves.

== Characters ==
Futoshi Mishima (三島 フトシ, Mishima Futoshi)

Mishima is a high school student who lives in a rural area with his single mother; his father died before he was born. At school he doesn't have any friends and is bullied for appearing to be gay. While he doesn't openly admit it, he does like men. He enjoys cross dressing, but since he doesn't have the means to do so, he usually just applies lipstick.

Makoto Kirino (桐野 マコト, Kirino Makoto)

One of the bullies who harassed Mishima alongside Yumeno. He secretly ends up becoming Mishima's friend after the latter discovers that, just like him, Kirino is gay and likes cross dressing. Kirino has hidden this side of him because of his conservative mother, who cannot accept the true nature of her son.

Tarō Yumeno (夢野 タロウ, Yumeno Tarō)

Kirino's friend and classmate, with whom he constantly used to harass Mishima. Yumeno says he hates Mishima, but in reality, he is in love with him and his harassment was only the result of his own conflicted feelings.

Yanagida (柳田, Yanagida)

Mishima, Kirino, and Yumeno's teacher. He is gay but has lived his entire life oppressed and was forced to marry a woman he didn't love. All this gave origin to the development of a very twisted personality. He is attracted to Mishima, whom he sexually harasses and even tries to rape.

== Media ==
=== Manga ===
The series started its serialization on August 12, 2011, and finished on February 13, 2013. It was published by Fusion Product and two volumes have been released in Japan. The manga has been licensed for its publication in Spain by Ediciones Tomodomo.

=== Drama CDs ===
A series of two Drama CDs have been released. The first one was launched on March 28, 2014, while the second one on May 30, 2014. The Japanese voice acting cast includes; Yoshitsugu Matsuoka as Mishima, Wataru Hatano as Kirino, Hiroyuki Yoshino as Yumeno, and Kōji Yusa as Yanagida.

=== TV drama ===
A live-action television drama adaptation of Smells Like Green Spirit was announced on August 23, 2024. The series was directed by Ikuko Sawada and aired on MBS' drama shower slot from September 20, 2024, to November 8, 2024.

The series stars Araki Towa as Mishima, Sono Shunta as Kirino, Fujimoto Kudai as Yumeno, and Abe Alan as Yanagida. Additional cast members include Wakana Sakai, Ogino Yuri, and Asuka Kurosawa, who played the mothers of Mishima, Kirino, and Yumeno, respectively.

A theatrical version of the drama was released on June 27, 2025.
