= New Life+: Young Again in Another World =

2014–2018 Japanese light novel series

- [New Life+] Young Again in Another World
- The cover of the first light novel volume

二度目の人生を異世界で (Nidome no Jinsei o Isekai de)
- Genre: Adventure, isekai
- Novel series
- Written by: MINE
- Published by: Shōsetsuka ni Narō
- Original run: 2014 – 2018
- Light novel
- Written by: MINE
- Illustrated by: Kabocha
- Published by: Hobby Japan
- English publisher: J-Novel Club
- Imprint: HJ Novels
- Original run: November 22, 2014 – May 24, 2018
- Volumes: 18
- Manga
- Written by: Satoru Abou
- Published by: Kadokawa Shoten
- Imprint: MF Comics
- Magazine: ComicWalker
- Original run: June 22, 2016 – December 3, 2021
- Volumes: 10

[New Life+] Young Again in Another World (Japanese: 二度目の人生を異世界で, Hepburn: Nidome no Jinsei o Isekai de) is a Japanese light novel series written by MINE and illustrated by Kabocha. The series was licensed in English by J-Novel Club. A manga adaptation by Satoru Abou was serialized from 2016 to 2021, and an anime television series adaptation by Seven Arcs Pictures was scheduled to premiere in October 2018, before it was cancelled on June 6, 2018. Following the announcement of the anime adaptation, the series and its author began to face criticism for controversial material in the novels and in Twitter posts that MINE had made between 2012 and 2015.

== Plot ==
The series involved a 94-year old Renya, who had a long and happy life on Earth. God requests that he enter a different magical world and live there in order to help release its "spiritual resources" after his death. God gives him a young body and many strong abilities to aid him. Renya continues to make his mark on this new world by slaying monsters and defeating bandits.

== Media ==
=== Light novels ===
MINE originally serialized the story as a web novel on the user-generated content site Shōsetsuka ni Narō starting on January 3, 2014. Following the controversy that broke out after the announcement of the anime adaptation, MINE announced plans on June 5, 2018, to discontinue serialization of the web novel. Hobby Japan acquired the series for print publication, and published the first light novel, with illustrations by Kabocha, under their HJ Novels imprint in November 2014. English publisher J-Novel Club announced their license to the series on January 13, 2018. On June 6, 2018, it was reported that Hobby Japan had cancelled shipments of the light novel series. On June 15, 2018, J-Novel Club announced that they would cease publishing the series on July 1, 2018.

No.	Original release date	Original ISBN	English release date	English ISBN
1	November 22, 2014	9784798609225	February 26, 2018	—
Prologue: "I Lived Long and Prospered, or So It Was Told"; Interlude: "The First One, or So It Was Told"; Chapter 1: "There Was Trouble on the Double, or So It Was Told"; Interlude: "The Second One, or So It Was Told"; Chapter 3: "The Battle Ended and It Was Clean-Up Time, or So It Was Told"; Chapter 4: "They Were Finally in Town, or So It Was Told"; Interlude: "The Third One, or So It Was Told"; Chapter 5: "From Reports to Invitations, or So It Was Told"; Epilogue: "A Party Was Formed, or So It Was Told"; Chapter 0: "On a Certain Day, in a Certain Time, at a Certain Place, or So It Was Told"
2	January 22, 2015	9784798609485	April 30, 2018	—
Prologue: "The First Interlude, or So It Was Told"; Chapter 1: "Training Began, or So It Was Told"; Chapter 2: "A Mission Was Accepted, or So It Was Told"; Chapter 3: "At the Dungeon Entrance, or So It Was Told"; Interlude: "The Second One, or So It Was Told"; Chapter 4: "Something Seemed Off About the Inaugural Dungeon Campaign, or So It Was Told"; Chapter 5: "Something Something Ill Weeds, Something Something Grow Apace, or So It Was Told"; Epilogue: "The Aftermath, or So It Was Told"; Chapter ?: "There Were Swords and Sorcery, or So It Was Told"
3	March 20, 2015	9784798609843	June 16, 2018	—
Prologue: "The Search for a Home Came First, or So It Was Told"; Chapter 1: "Time for a Property Viewing, or So It Was Told"; Chapter 2: "Azu Returned, or So It Was Told"; Interlude: "The First One, or So It Was Told"; Chapter 3: "They Departed on a Guild Mission, or So It Was Told"; Chapter 4: "The Fool Had Company, or So It Was Told"; Interlude: "The Second One, or So It Was Told"; Chapter 5: "They Were Going to the Elf Kingdom, or So It Was Told"; Epilogue: "After a Discovery, Things Looked Fishy, or So It Was Told"; Interlude: "The Third One - They the Pitiful and Their Aftermath, Or So It Was Told"
4	May 22, 2015	9784798610177	—	—
5	July 23, 2015	9784798610511	—	—
6	September 19, 2015	9784798610740	—	—
7	November 21, 2015	9784798611181	—	—
8	January 22, 2016	9784798611549	—	—
9	March 24, 2016	9784798611976	—	—
10	May 21, 2016	9784798612287	—	—
11	July 22, 2016	9784798612645	—	—
12	September 23, 2016	9784798612904	—	—
13	November 24, 2016	9784798613284	—	—
14	January 21, 2017	9784798613680	—	—
15	March 23, 2017	9784798614120	—	—
16	June 22, 2017	9784798614670	—	—
17	October 21, 2017	9784798615561	—	—
18	May 24, 2018	9784798616506	—	—

=== Manga ===
A manga adaptation by Satoru Abou was published on Kadokawa Shoten's ComicWalker website. The manga went on hiatus in late May 2018 following the controversy surrounding the author. It returned from hiatus on August 22, 2018, and ended on December 3, 2021.

No.	Japanese release date	Japanese ISBN
1	November 24, 2016	9784040687056
2	June 23, 2017	9784040691947
3	September 23, 2017	9784040694368
4	January 22, 2018	9784040697505
5	June 6, 2018	9784040698816
6	February 22, 2019	9784040651255
7	August 23, 2019	9784040658711
8	April 23, 2020	9784040645742
9	December 23, 2020	9784040659985
10	December 23, 2021	9784046807922

=== Cancelled anime ===
An anime television series adaptation was announced on May 22, 2018, and was scheduled to premiere in October 2018. The series would have been directed by Keitaro Motonaga and written by Takamitsu Kouno, Touko Machida, Koujirou Nakamura, and Chabo Higurashi, with animation by Seven Arcs Pictures. Makoto Takahoko would have provided the series' character designs. However, on June 6, 2018, it was announced that the production and broadcast of the anime had been cancelled due to the controversy surrounding the author and his novels.

== Controversy ==
Following the announcement of the anime adaptation, the series and its author became the subject of a controversy. A number of commentators on Twitter claimed that the series depicts the protagonist as having taken part in the Second Sino-Japanese War, where he killed 3,000 people with a katana, later going on to kill another 2,000 after the war. Additionally, commentators discovered several tweets by the author from 2013 to 2015 containing insulting statements about China, as well as tweets from 2012 to 2014 that allegedly contained similar messages about South Korea.

On June 5, 2018, author MINE apologized via Twitter. He also deleted all of his past Tweets and announced plans to leave Twitter once his apology spread. In regards to the content of his novels, MINE stated that he would no longer serialize the web novel on Shōsetsuka ni Narō and would begin discussions with his publisher about correcting inappropriate material in the print versions.

On June 6, 2018, voice actors Toshiki Masuda, Megumi Nakajima, and Kiyono Yasuno simultaneously announced their resignations from the anime adaptation. The actors were set to play the parts of Renya Kunugi, Rona Chevalier, and Shion Femme-Fatale, respectively. On the same day, talent management agency 81 Produce announced that Nanami Yamashita, originally set to play God in the series, was also resigning.

Also on June 6, the website for the anime became unavailable worldwide except Japan, returning only a 403 Forbidden error. The production committee then posted an announcement on the website that production and broadcast of the anime had been cancelled due to the controversy. The committee also apologized.

Hobby Japan, the publisher of the original light novel series, posted an apology on June 6. Later that day, The Asahi Shimbun reported that the publisher had decided to cancel shipments of the light novel.

On June 15, 2018, J-Novel Club announced that they would suspend publication of the series on July 1, 2018, and would no longer offer it for sale "pending further consultation with the Japanese rights holder".
