= Please Tell Me! Galko-chan =

Japanese manga and anime series

- Volume 1 cover

おしえて！ギャル子ちゃん (Oshiete! Gyaruko-chan)
- Genre: Comedy; Slice of life
- Manga
- Written by: Kenya Suzuki
- Published by: Media Factory
- English publisher: NA: Seven Seas Entertainment
- Imprint: MF Comics
- Magazine: ComicWalker
- Original run: 27 June 2014 – present
- Volumes: 5
- Anime television series
- Directed by: Keiichiro Kawaguchi
- Produced by: Hiroshi Satō; Noritomo Isogai; Shō Tanaka; Takashi Hijikata; Terushige Yoshie; Yoshiki Usa
- Written by: Keiichiro Kawaguchi
- Music by: Ryō Takahashi
- Studio: Feel
- Licensed by: Crunchyroll
- Original network: AT-X, Tokyo MX, BS11
- Original run: 8 January 2016 – 25 March 2016
- Episodes: 12 + OVA
- icon

Please Tell Me! Galko-chan (Japanese: おしえて！ギャル子ちゃん, Hepburn: Oshiete! Gyaruko-chan) is a Japanese manga series written and illustrated by Kenya Suzuki. The manga is licensed in English by Seven Seas Entertainment. A 12 episode short-form anime series adaptation by Feel aired from January to March 2016.

== Characters ==
Galko (ギャル子, Gyaruko)
Voiced by: Azumi Waki
The main character of the series, who despite her name and appearance, is very inexperienced and innocent, and is easily embarrassed over her physique and what she says, as she sometimes accidentally says suggestive things. She has difficulty waking up early, but becomes more active as the day passes. She is also very emotional and becomes easily involved when reading books or watching movies, to the point of crying. She enjoys cooking, and usually makes her own bentos, and can even make bread. She is also terrified of body modifications such as piercings, despite having earrings. She also has an older sister, with whom she often exchanges clothes, including her school uniform; she gets angry, however, after finding out just what her sister does with it. Her name refers to gyaru subculture in Japan.
Otako (オタ子)
Voiced by: Miyu Tomita
One of Galko's friends, an otaku with glasses who likes to mock Galko and gets constantly annoyed by her inability to wake up early. She likes to tell and ask Galko especially about suggestive topics. Between classes, Otako prefers to sit quietly and read. At home she watches anime based on her brother's recommendations.
Ojou (お嬢, Ojō)
Voiced by: Minami Takahashi
Another of Galko's friends, who is a proper lady from a rich family. She is friendly and somewhat of an airhead.
Charao (チャラ男)
Voiced by: Takahiro Sakurai
One of Galko's classmates, a blond boy who is outgoing, popular, and tends to tease Galko. He is the vocalist and bassist of the school's light music club.
Supoo (スポ男)
Voiced by: Daisuke Ono
One of Galko's classmates and Charao's friends. He is the tallest boy at his class. He's a regular at the school's baseball team, and is very careful but proud about his haircut.
Otao (オタ男)
Voiced by: Yoshitsugu Matsuoka
One of Galko's classmates and Charao's friends. A shy otaku boy with glasses who has a crush on Galko. He is shown to be a closet pervert.
Nikuko (肉子)
Voiced by: Juri Kimura
Another of Galko's classmates, a very plump girl with glasses. She is a member of the girl's futsal team, nicknamed "Sonic Meat" by the boys because she is very fast despite her weight.
Abesen (アベセン)
Voiced by: Yuichi Nakamura
Galko's homeroom teacher.
Okako (オカ子)
Voiced by: Yuko Iida
Galko's very tall classmate who has a bad posture due to her height, and is also interested in the occult. The boys start stalking her after they learn from Galko that she also has big breasts.
Iinchou (委員長, Iinchō)
Voiced by: Ayaka Suwa
The class president of Galko's class with a serious personality. Her name translates literally into "class president".
Bomuo (ボム男)
Voiced by: Makoto Furukawa
Galko's quiet classmate who was initially annoyed by her, but warms slightly to her after she changes his eye-covering hairstyle. He earned his nickname from Charao after coming to school with bed hair, and Galko fixed his hair for him. He buys beauty products and starts using that as his regular hairstyle, and appears to have developed a crush on her.
Ouji (王子, Ōji)
Voiced by: Yuna Yoshino
Galko's classmate who is very tomboyish. She is often shown talking with Iinchou. Her name translates literally into "Prince".
Galko's sister
Voiced by: Yoko Hikasa
Galko's older sister, who has tanned skin and even bigger breasts than Galko's. She also has a boyfriend, with whom she has engaged in sexual roleplay while wearing her sister's uniform, much to Galko's disgust upon finding out.

== Manga ==
Kenya Suzuki originally began publishing the series on Twitter, but it was moved to Kadokawa's ComicWalker website on 27 June 2014. As of November 2015, the manga had been viewed over one million times. The series is licensed for publication in North America by Seven Seas Entertainment.

On 20 December 2021, Suzuki was arrested on suspicion of importing child pornography from Germany. Four days later, Kadokawa responded by suspending the serialisation of the manga. On 29 March 2022, Suzuki was sentenced to one year and two months in prison, suspended for three years. ComicWalker resumed the publication of the manga on 15 October 2025.

=== Volumes ===
No.	Original release date	Original ISBN	English release date	English ISBN
1	22 November 2014	9784040671857	22 November 2016	978-1-626923-62-1
2	19 June 2015	9784040676845	7 February 2017	978-1-626924-30-7
3	22 February 2016	9784040679129	6 June 2017	978-1-626924-91-8
4	23 January 2017	9784040687124	24 October 2017	978-1-626925-57-1
5	23 July 2018	9784040697529	12 February 2019	978-1-626926-88-2
6	23 June 2026	9784046601339	—	—

== Anime ==
An anime television series written and directed by Keiichiro Kawaguchi and animated by the animation studio Feel. Kenji Fujisaki provided the series' character designs. The opening theme song is performed by the voice actresses for the three main characters. It consisted of twelve 7 minute episodes.

The series premiered on 8 January 2016 as part of Ultra Super Anime Time on Tokyo MX, BS11, and AT-X. Crunchyroll simulcasted the series worldwide outside of Asia.

An original video animation was bundled with a special edition of the fourth manga volume, which was released on 23 January 2017.

=== Episode list ===
No.	Title	Original release date
1	"Is It True You're a Gyaru?" "Gyaru na Onna no Ko tte Hontō Desu ka?" (ギャルな女の子って本当ですか？)	8 January 2016
2	"Is It True That You're a Rich Girl?" "Ojō-sama tte Hontō Desu ka?" (お嬢様って本当ですか？)	15 January 2016
3	"Is It True That You're an Otaku Girl?" "Otaku na Onna no Ko tte Hontō Desu ka?" (オタクな女の子って本当ですか？)	22 January 2016
Galko gets a tan from a tanning salon, leading to Otako making fun of her having dark nipples. She says that her nipples are still pink because she wore pasties, so then Otako makes fun of her for that. One of the boys is talking about an anime, which he is bullied for, but then when Galko asks to know more about it, the bully decides he'll start watching that anime. Otako makes fun of Galko's nipples again, then the next day says that inverted nipples can be a problem for people with large breasts, leading to complications with motherhood. This makes Galko sad as she wants to be a mother, and she runs from class crying. After that, Galko misses a few days of school, and Otako gets worried. Ojou tells Otako to make up with Galko, so Otako goes to Galko's home. When Galko doesn't answer, Otako gives an emotional apology, and then Galko reveals she was only out sick from school and invites her in.
4	"Is It True That You Can't Help Moaning?" "Koe ga Dechau tte Hontō Desu ka?" (声が出ちゃうって本当ですか？)	29 January 2016
Ojou, Otako and Galko compare hand sizes, and Galko gets self-conscious about the size of her hands. Then, Otako spots a pubic hair on Galko's shoulder, but doesn't make fun of her for it because she doesn't want to make her upset, only for Galko to point it out herself. Ojou gives Galko and Otako massages, but neither can stop themselves from moaning in class. Galko helps everyone in the class by having what they need. Otako makes fun of her by asking for a pad and a condom, which Ojou misunderstands to her great embarrassment. Otako makes fun of Galko's large breasts and areolae again, and Ojou is glad everything is back to normal.
5	"Is It True That You're a Big Sister?" "Onee-chan tte Hontō Desu ka?" (おねーちゃんって本当ですか？)	5 February 2016
6	"Is It True That Underwear Is Embarrassing?" "Shitagi wa Hazui tte Hontō Desu ka?" (下着はハズいって本当ですか？)	12 February 2016
7	"Is It True About the Boy at the Pool?" "Pūru to Shōnen tte Hontō Desu ka?" (プールと少年って本当ですか？)	19 February 2016
8	"Is It True You Have Horrible Bed-head?" "Hidoi Neguse tte Hontō Desu ka?" (ヒドい寝ぐせって本当ですか？)	26 February 2016
9	"Is It True You're Scared of Holes?" "Ana ga Kowai tte Hontō Desu ka?" (穴がコワいって本当ですか？)	4 March 2016
10	"Is It True You Come to School After Being Out All Night?" "Asagaeri Tōkō tte Hontō Desu ka?" (朝帰り登校って本当ですか？)	11 March 2016
11	"Is It True That Butts Are Culture?" "Oshiri wa Bunmei tte Hontō Desu ka?" (お尻は文明って本当ですか？)	18 March 2016
12	"Is It True You're Friends Forever?" "Isshō no Tomodachi tte Hontō Desu ka?" (一生の友達って本当ですか？)	25 March 2016
