= Yumi Hara =

Japanese voice actress (born 1985)

- 原 由実
- Born: January 21, 1985 (age 41); Osaka Prefecture, Japan
- Occupations: Voice actress, singer
- Years active: 2008–present
- Agent: Arts Vision
- Notable credit(s): Dusk Maiden of Amnesia as Yuuko Kanoe; Trinity Seven as Lilith Asami; The Idolmaster as Takane Shijō; Overlord as Albedo; Senran Kagura as Yumi; Tekken 7 as Kazumi Mishima; Blue Archive as Akane Murokasa; Path to Nowhere as Adela; Zenless Zone Zero as Yidhari Murphy
- Children: 2
- Website: Ameblo.jp

Yumi Hara (原 由実, Hara Yumi; born January 21, 1985) is a Japanese voice actress and singer. In December 2017, she had a hiatus from her singing career.

== Personal life ==
Hara announced her marriage on September 26, 2019. On July 17, 2020, she announced that she had given birth to a boy. On December 31, 2023, she announced on her blog the birth of her second child, a girl.

== Filmography ==
=== Anime ===
2011

- Infinite Stratos, Kagura Shijūin
- The Idolmaster, Takane Shijō
- Sket Dance, Sawa Yamauchi

2012

- Dusk Maiden of Amnesia, Yūko Kanoe
- Ginga e Kickoff!!, Mrs. Mochizuki
- Lagrange: The Flower of Rin-ne, Inaho Yukawa

2013

- Log Horizon, Marielle
- Ro-Kyu-Bu! SS, Aya Miyakōji

2014

- Trinity Seven, Lilith Asami
- Log Horizon 2, Marielle

2015

- Overlord, Albedo
- Mysterious Joker, Ai
- Shomin Sample, Eri Hanae, Marika (Ep. 5), Fortuneteller Moon (Ep. 8)
- Utawarerumono: Itsuwari no Kamen, Atui

2016

- Anne Happy, Kodaira
- Ange Vierge, Almaria
- Brave Witches, Aleksandra I. "Sasha" Pokryshkin
- Hitori no Shita: The Outcast, Fuusaen
- The Ancient Magus' Bride: Those Awaiting a Star, Niikura, Mayumi + Maho

2017

- Chaos;Child, Yui Tachibana
- Ren'ai Bōkun, Shikimi Shiramine
- Tales of Zestiria the X, Muse

2018

- A Certain Magical Index III, Oyafune Suama
- Ms. Koizumi Loves Ramen Noodles, Jun Takahashi
- Overlord (Season 2 and 3), Albedo
- Magical Girl Site, Kosame Amagai
- How Not to Summon a Demon Lord, Alicia Cristela
- Senran Kagura: Shinovi Master, Yumi

2019

- Isekai Quartet, Albedo
- Val × Love, Futaba Saotome

2020

- Isekai Quartet 2, Albedo
- Kakushigoto, Kumi Jouro

2021

- Log Horizon: Destruction of the Round Table, Marielle
- Heaven's Design Team, Ueda
- How Not to Summon a Demon Lord Ω, Alicia Cristela
- Scarlet Nexus, Kyoka Eden

2022

- Life with an Ordinary Guy Who Reincarnated into a Total Fantasy Knockout (Episode 8), Priestess
- Overlord (Season 4), Albedo
- Utawarerumono: Mask of Truth, Atui

2023

- Revenger, Yui

2024

- Tales of Wedding Rings, Smaragdi
- Re:Monster, Doriane
- Studio Apartment, Good Lighting, Angel Included, Kujaku
- Mysterious Disappearances, Kotaka

2025

- The Apothecary Diaries season 2, Aylin

2026

- Chainsmoker Cat, Shizue Satō

=== Original video animation (OVA) ===
- Senran Kagura: Estival Versus – Festival Eve Full of Swimsuits (2015), Yumi
- Strike Witches: Operation Victory Arrow (2015), Aleksandra I. "Sasha" Pokryshkin
- Bikini Warriors (2016), Kunoichi
- Girls und Panzer das Finale (2017), Marie

=== Theatrical animation ===
- Strike Witches: The Movie (2012), Aleksandra I. "Sasha" Pokryshkin
- The Idolmaster Movie: Beyond the Brilliant Future! (2013), Takane Shijō
- Accel World: Infinite Burst (2016), Utai Shinomiya/Ardor Maiden
- New Initial D the Movie Legend 3: Dream (2016), Mako Sato
- Trinity Seven the Movie: The Eternal Library and the Alchemist Girl (2017), Lilith Asami
- Trinity Seven: Heavens Library & Crimson Lord (2019), Lilith Asami

=== Original net animation (ONA) ===
- Puchimas! Petit Idolmaster (2014), Takane Shijō; Takanya

=== Video games ===
- Criminal Girls (2010), Tomoe Harukawa
- Senran Kagura Shinovi Versus (2013), Yumi
- Akiba's Trip (2013), Sara
- Criminal Girls: Invitation (2013), Tomoe Harukawa
- Omega Quintet (2014), Shiori
- Atelier Shallie: Alchemists of the Dusk Sea (2014), Rosemia
- Granblue Fantasy (2014), Zalhamelina
- Mobius Final Fantasy (2015), Sarah
- Senran Kagura Estival Versus (2015), Yumi
- Tales of Zestiria (2015), Muse
- Tekken 7 (2015), Kazumi Mishima
- Utawarerumono: Itsuwari no Kamen (2015), Atui
- Utawarerumono: Futari no Hakuoro (2016), Atui
- Drive Girls (2017), Regalith
- Accel World vs. Sword Art Online: Millennium Twilight (2017), Utai Shinomiya/Ardor Maiden
- Senran Kagura: Peach Beach Splash (2017), Yumi
- Senran Kagura Reflexions (2017), Yumi
- Shinobi Master Senran Kagura: New Link (2017), Yumi
- Fate/Grand Order (2018), Anastasia Nikolaevna Romanova
- Brown Dust (2018), Celia
- BlazBlue: Cross Tag Battle (2019), Yumi (Senran Kagura)
- Senran Kagura: Peach Ball (2019), Yumi
- Azur Lane (2020), Peter Strasser, Yumi (Senran Kagura)
- Kandagawa Jet Girls (2020), Yumi
- The Legend of Heroes: Trails Through Daybreak II (2022), Naje Berca
- Azur Lane (2023), Yumi
- Zenless Zone Zero (2025), Yidhari Murphy
- The Idolmaster series – Takane Shijō
- Corpse Party series – Satsuki Mizuhara
- Mugen Souls series – Dees Vanguard
- Valkyrie Drive: Bhikkhuni series – Mana Inagawa
- NieR Reincarnation - Mama/Pod 006
- Counterside - Carmen
- Freaked Fleapit - Sally
- Grand Chase: Dimensional Chaser – Deia
- Blue Archive – Akane Murokasa
- Path to Nowhere – Adela
- Genshin Impact (2026), Danica

== Discography ==
=== Singles ===
- "Hanabi" (August 22, 2012)
- "Hotarubi" (March 27, 2013)
- "intention" (July 24, 2013)
- "Rose on the breast" (June 25, 2014)
- "Crossover" (October 29, 2014)
- "improvisation" (May 27, 2015)
- "Twilight ni Kienaide" (November 25, 2015)
- "Prism Rain" (June 22, 2016)
- "If you..." (January 25, 2017)

=== Albums ===
- Place of my life (December 25, 2013)
- Kokoro ni Saku Hana (September 25, 2015)
- YOU&ME (March 14, 2018)

=== Music videos ===
- Catch my voices (January 28, 2015)
