= Hiroshi Nishikiori =

Japanese anime director

- 錦織博
- Born: May 20, 1966 (age 60)
- Occupation: Anime director
- Years active: 1999–present
- Known for: Angelic Layer; Azumanga Daioh; A Certain Magical Index

Hiroshi Nishikiori (Japanese: 錦織博, Hepburn: Nishikiori Hiroshi; born May 20, 1966) is a Japanese anime director. He debuted in 1999 with I'm Gonna Be An Angel! Two years later, he directed Angelic Layer, which won the Animation Kobe in the television category. Some of his other major works include Azumanga Daioh, A Certain Magical Index, and Argonavis from BanG Dream!

== Biography ==
Hiroshi Nishikiori was born on May 20, 1966. In 1999, Nishikiori made his directorial debut with I'm Gonna Be An Angel!. In 2001, Nishikiori directed the anime adaptation of Angelic Layer, which won the Animation Kobe in the television category. From 2008 to 2019, he directed the anime adaptation of A Certain Magical Index, as well as its theatrical film, A Certain Magical Index: The Movie – The Miracle of Endymion. In 2020, he directed Argonavis from BanG Dream!.

== Works ==
=== TV series ===
- I'm Gonna Be An Angel! (1999) (director)
- Angelic Layer (2001) (director)
- Azumanga Daioh (2002) (director)
- Gad Guard (2003) (director)
- Melody of Oblivion (2004) (director)
- Oku-sama wa Mahō Shōjo: Bewitched Agnes (2004–2005) (director)
- Kaiketsu Zorori (2004–2005) (director)
- Jyu-Oh-Sei (2006) (director)
- Ghost Slayers Ayashi (2006–2007) (director)
- A Certain Magical Index (2008–2019) (director)
- Futari wa Milky Holmes (2013–2015) (director)
- Trinity Seven (2014) (director)
- Schoolgirl Strikers (2017) (director)
- Dances with the Dragons (2018) (chief director)
- Argonavis from BanG Dream! (2020) (director)
- Delico's Nursery (2024) (director)
- Honey Lemon Soda (2025) (director)
- Eleceed (2027) (director)

=== Films ===
- Doki Doki Wildcat Engine (2000) (director)
- Magic Tree House (2012) (director)
- A Certain Magical Index: The Movie – The Miracle of Endymion (2013) (director)
- Trinity Seven the Movie: The Eternal Library and the Alchemist Girl (2017) (director)
- Monster Strike: Sora no Kanata (2018) (director)
- Trinity Seven: Heavens Library & Crimson Lord (2019) (director)
- Gekijōban Idolish7 Live 4bit Beyond the Period (2023) (director)

=== Original video animation ===
- Yotsunoha (2008) (director)
