= Seven Arcs =

Japanese animation studio

Seven Arcs Co., Ltd.
- Native name: 株式会社Seven Arcs
- Romanized name: Kabushiki-gaisha Sebun Ākusu
- Type: Kabushiki kaisha
- Industry: Anime (Television, Film, OVA)
- Founded: May 31, 2002; 24 years ago
- Headquarters: Nakano, Tokyo, Japan
- Key people: Yuuji Yoshida (Note: Chairman of the board and CEO.); Kouichi Kawase (Note: Executive vice president.); Jun Yasuda; Tatsuya Tanaka (Note: Board member.); Masahiko Itou (Note: Board member.); Kenji Itou (Note: Part-time board member.); Hidefumi Yasuda Wataru Hatakeyama
- Number of employees: 83 (as of January 2026)
- Parent: TBS Holdings
- Subsidiaries: Arcturus (2002–2012); Seven Arcs Pictures (2012–2019)
- Website: 7arcs.co.jp

Arcturus
- Native name: 有限会社アークトゥールス
- Romanized name: Yūgen gaisha Arcturus
- Type: Kabushiki kaisha
- Industry: Anime (OVA)
- Founded: April 7, 2000; 26 years ago
- Founder: Osamu Kamimura; Keizō Kusakawa; Kazunori Mizuno; Ryou Yasumura
- Defunct: October 1, 2019; 7 years ago
- Fate: Merged into Seven Arcs
- Headquarters: Suginami, Toko, Japan
- Key people: Osamu Kamimura (CEO)
- Parent: Seven Arcs (2002–2019)

Seven Arcs Co., Ltd. (Japanese: 株式会社Seven Arcs, Hepburn: Kabushiki-gaisha Sebun Ākusu) is a Japanese anime production company and former studio, established on May 31, 2002, by former Pierrot and Studio Kikan-affiliated staff who had established studio Arcturus prior in 2000 with the intent of making animated series. The studio made its first animated television series, Magical Girl Lyrical Nanoha, in 2004. Since then, the company has produced a number of other animated television series and movies.

In 2012, the animation section was split off by forming Seven Arcs Pictures Co., Ltd. (Japanese: 株式会社Seven Arcs Pictures, Hepburn: Kabushiki-gaisha Sebun Ākusu Pikuchāzu) as a subsidiary company. Since then, Seven Arcs has had its business in animation planning and licence management. On December 26, 2017, the company was acquired by Tokyo Broadcasting System Holdings. Seven Arcs Pictures, Seven Arcs, and Arcturus merged on October 1, 2019, reforming as the single company Seven Arcs.

The title of the studio refers to the 7th of the 12 principles of animation.

== Representative staff ==
=== Current ===
- Yuuji Yoshida (Chairman of the board, 2024–; 3rd CEO, 2025–)
- Kouichi Kawase (Executive vice president, 2026–)
- Jun Yasuda (Executive vice president, 2026–)
- Tatsuya Tanaka (Board member, 2025–; 2nd president and CEO (2019–2024))
- Kenji Itou (Part-time board member, 2026–)
- Hidefumi Yasuda (Part-time board member, 2026–)
- Wataru Hatakeyama (Part-time board member, 2026–)
- Yasunori Tani (Auditor, 2026–)

=== Former ===
- Osamu Kamimura (President and CEO, 2003–2019)
- Ryou Yasumura (President and CEO of Seven Arcs Pictures, 2012–2019)
- Shigeki Fujioka (President and chairman, 2019–2022; president and chairman of Seven Arcs Pictures, (2019); co-president and COO, 2022–2024)
- Hitoshi Murakami (CCO and board member, 2022–2024)
- Tomoyuki Saitou (CCO and board member, 2023–2026)
- Kazunari Masuda (CFO and board member, 2022–2024)
- Masahiko Itou (Board member, 2026)
- Keita Mishima (Part-time board member, 2022–2023)
- Shinya Watanabe (Part-time board member, 2022–2023)
- Tatsuya Juuni (Part-time board member, 2022–2024)
- Yasuhiro Yamada (Part-time board member, 2022–2024)
- Toshihiro Shimizu (Part-time board member, 2023–2024)
- Tadao Matsuno (Part-time board member, 2023–2024)
- Kazuhiko Akatsu (Part-time board member, 2024–2026)
- Shinjirou Watanabe (Part-time board member, 2024–2026)
- Eiji Takayuki (Board member, 2024–2026; CFO, 2023–2024)
- Jun Shinozaki (Board member, 2025–2026; executive officer, 2024)
- Jun Nasuda (Part-time board member, 2024–2026; part-time chairman of the board 2022–2024)
- Tadayuki Tsuchiya (Auditor, 2022–2023)
- Jin Kuwahara (Auditor, 2023–2024)
- Heisuke Shimizu (Auditor, 2024)
- Heisuke Aihara (Auditor, 2025–2026)
- Kouji Kajita (Executive officer, 2022–2023)
- Souichi Toyota (Executive officer, 2023)
- Hisashi Takamatsu (Executive officer, 2023–2024)

== Productions ==
=== Seven Arcs (2002–2012) ===
==== Television series ====
- Magical Girl Lyrical Nanoha (2004)
- Magical Girl Lyrical Nanoha A's (2005)
- Inukami! (2006)
- Magical Girl Lyrical Nanoha StrikerS (2007)
- Sekirei (2008)
- White Album (2009)
- Asura Cryin' (2009)
- Asura Cryin' 2 (2009)
- Sekirei ~Pure Engagement~ (2010)
- Dog Days (2011)
- Dog Days' (2012)

==== OVA ====
- Triangle Heart: Sweet Songs Forever (2003)
- Sekirei (2008)
- Sekirei ~Pure Engagement~ (2010)

==== Films ====
- Inukami! The Movie: Tokumei Reiteki Sōsakan Karina Shirō! (2007)
- Magical Girl Lyrical Nanoha The MOVIE 1st (2010)
- Magical Girl Lyrical Nanoha The MOVIE 2nd A's (2012)

=== Seven Arcs Pictures (2012–2019) ===
==== Television series ====
- Mushibugyo (2013)
- Trinity Seven (2014)
- Dog Days" (2015)
- Ooya-san wa Shishunki! (2016)
- Idol Memories (2016)
- ViVid Strike! (2016)
- Basilisk: The Ouka Ninja Scrolls (2018)
- Dances with the Dragons (2018)
- Bermuda Triangle: Colorful Pastrale (2019)

==== OVA/ONA ====
- Mushibugyo (2014–2015)
- Trinity Seven (2015)
- Majestic Prince: Wings to the Future (2016, co-production with Orange)

==== Films ====
- Yakusoku no Utsuwa: Arita no Hatsukoi (2016)
- Fuyu no Chikai, Natsu no Matsuri: Takeoshi no Dai-Kusunoki (2016)
- Galactic Armored Fleet Majestic Prince: Genetic Awakening (2016, co-production with Orange)
- Trinity Seven the Movie: The Eternal Library and the Alchemist Girl (2017)
- Magical Girl Lyrical Nanoha Reflection (2017)
- Magical Girl Lyrical Nanoha Detonation (2018)
- Trinity Seven: Heavens Library & Crimson Lord (2019)

==== Canceled works ====
- New Life+: Young Again in Another World - Originally planned for an October 2018 premiere. However, it was later cancelled on account of controversial remarks by the light novel's author MINE

=== Seven Arcs (merged company, 2019–present) ===
==== Television series ====
- Arte (2020)
- Fly Me to the Moon (2020–2023)
- Blue Period (2021)
- Extreme Hearts (2022)
- Chained Soldier (2024)
- Failure Frame: I Became the Strongest and Annihilated Everything with Low-Level Spells (2024)
- Magical Girl Lyrical Nanoha Exceeds Gun Blaze Vengeance (2026)

==== OVA/ONA ====
- Fly Me to the Moon ~SNS~ (2021)

==== Films ====
- Toi-san (2025)
