= Trinity Seven the Movie: The Eternal Library and the Alchemist Girl =

2017 film by Hiroshi Nishikiori

- Kanji: 劇場版 トリニティセブン -悠久図書館と錬金術少女-
- Revised Hepburn: Gekijōban Toriniti Sebun: Yūkyū Toshokan to Renkinjutsu Shōjo
- Directed by: Hiroshi Nishikiori
- Screenplay by: Kenji Saitō
- Based on: Trinity Seven by Kenji Saitō and Nao Akinari
- Produced by: Yoshikazu Beniya; Mika Shimizu; Daisuke Masaki; Shigeki Hosoda; Shunsuke Matsumura; Yuuya Yoshida; Yoshifumi Matsuda
- Starring: Yoshitsugu Matsuoka; Yumi Hara; Aya Uchida; Ayane Sakura; Yōko Hikasa; Ryoka Yuzuki; Rie Murakawa; Nao Tōyama; Aya Suzaki
- Cinematography: Megumi Enomoto
- Edited by: Kazuhiko Seki
- Music by: Technoboys Pulcraft Green-Fund ff
- Production company: Seven Arcs
- Distributed by: Avex Pictures
- Release date: February 25, 2017
- Running time: 55 minutes
- Country: Japan
- Language: Japanese

Trinity Seven the Movie: The Eternal Library and the Alchemist Girl (Japanese: 劇場版 トリニティセブン -悠久図書館と錬金術少女-, Hepburn: Gekijōban Toriniti Sebun: Yūkyū Toshokan to Renkinjutsu Shōjo) is a 2017 Japanese animated romantic comedy fantasy film directed by Hiroshi Nishikiori and written by Kenji Satō based on the Trinity Seven manga series, which Satō co-created with Akinari Nao. Produced by Seven Arcs and distributed by Avex Pictures, The Eternal Library and the Alchemist Girl marks the first film in the series, and involves the Trinity Seven encountering a White Demon Lord that was sealed inside the Eternal Library, while Arata and Lilith encounters a mysterious girl named Lilim. The film stars the voices of Yoshitsugu Matsuoka, Yumi Hara, Aya Uchida, Ayane Sakura, Yōko Hikasa, Ryoka Yuzuki, Rie Murakawa, Nao Tōyama, and Aya Suzaki. The Eternal Library and the Alchemist Girl was released in Japan on February 25, 2017.

Crunchyroll licensed the film, and streamed on its website on March 17, 2017.

== Plot ==
At the beach, Arata recounts his dream to Lieselotte, currently possessing her sister Selina's body, who offers her bottom to touch, much to Selina's distress and Lilith's refusal. Nevertheless, Lieselotte promises to grant him permission for her actual body although the girls again denounce such an action. Afterwards, the group discusses the significance of his dream, as well as the reason for Lilith's grimoire, Hermes Apocrypha, shining. However, when Arata touches Hermes, the grimoire illuminates before Arata suddenly partially transforms into the Demon Lord which his grimoires quickly attempt to control. Meanwhile, Hermes continues to absorb his magic until a young girl unexpectedly appears. While the group is astonished by the grimoire's transformation, the young girl suddenly address Arata and Lilith as her parents to their surprise. Nevertheless, after recovering from the shock, Arata questions the girl of her identity, but she instead requests that he give her a name. In response, Arata suggests Lilim since she resembles Lilith which the child happily accepts. Arin then arrives upon hearing that Arata and Lilith bore a child, only to become enthralled by Lilim's appearance. She offers to allow Lilim to address her as mother as well, although the grimoire refuses much to Arin's frustration. Arin then explains that because Lilim possesses both Arata and Lilith's magic, she had believed that the child was theirs but realizes her mistake. Yui next arrives after sensing a strong magic but upon witnessing Lilim becomes jealous that Arata created an offspring with Lilith. The teacher attempts to deny the misunderstanding but eventually concedes to the idea much to Lilim's excitement. Arata then asks Levi, who was hiding in the room, to explain the situation, which the ninja reveals that Hermes had absorbed his magic to transform into a human. Following her explanation, both Akio and Mira arrive to investigate the source of an impure magic when Mira also becomes captivated by Lilim while the misapprehensions continue. Subsequently, Lieselotte and Yui also attempt to use Arata to transform their grimoires as well with no success while the young grimoire is pampered by the remaining girls. However, Arata eventually faints since his magic had been assimilated into Lilim much to Lilith's concern.

In his office, the Headmaster discusses with Master Liber that her prophecy of the Eternal Library awakening had been fulfilled. With the world in crisis, Biblia proposes an alliance with Iscariot which Hijiri and Lugh agree in order to protect Arata. However, Liber reveals that their opponent is an alchemist and product of Outer Alchemic sealed in the Library, the White Demon Lord. Elsewhere in a throne, Last Trinity converses with a female voice of a Magus who orders him to awaken, confirming that the Eternal Library has awakened when a Demon Lord Candidate touched Hermes Apocrypha. As such, in order to become a true Demon Lord, Last becomes determined to defeat the Candidate of the Trinity Seven. After witnessing the scene, Arata awakens in the infirmary upon recovering his magic before leaving to enjoy a bath. Arriving at the hot baths, he encounters the girls bathing much to Mira and Selina's embarrassment, but the others simply accept his presence. While the group rests in the water, Sora and Ilia contemplate Lilim's sudden activation, noting that the original grimoires they descended from were already conscious. Nevertheless, the girls continue to enjoy themselves, which Arata expresses his gratitude towards Lilim. Afterwards, Arata reveals that he had another dream again, which Mira and Yui theorize that someone is manipulating them through magic similar to the latters. As Arata recalls the sequence in detail such as the female voice, his mention of Last Trinity causes a Breakdown Phenomenon from the Luxuria Archive to suddenly appear. In response, the party transforms into their respective Magus Modes before departing to handle the situation.

While running through the halls, the grimoires return to their respective masters before demonic creatures appear to surround the group. Fortunately, Lugh and Hijiri arrive to help them dispatch the demons despite Mira's skepticism of their motive. Hijiri then reveals that they are currently within the Eternal Library where the founder of Outer Alchemic, Hohenheim, was researching the method to create a Demon Lord. The master of the Library, the White Demon Lord's, Last Trinity, goal is to defeat Arata which was probably Hohenheim's plan, including Lilim's transformation. As Arata is able to discern the Demon Lord's presence, a Code D dragon unexpectedly materializes, forcing them to divide into different parties as one battles the beast while the other confronts Last Trinity. As Arata and his group continues forward while eliminating the demons towards Last Trinity's location, a shot is suddenly fired at him but both Arin and Hijiri manage to protect him. The culprit is revealed to be the White Demon Lord who introduces himself before disrupting Arata by absorbing his magic. Capable of using his magic, Last then attempts to dispose the Candidate, but the Ira mages barely manage to defend him again. In response, Hijiri transform into the Satan Mode while Arin summons her Demon Spear Gae Bulg prior to retaliating, seemingly incapacitating the Demon Lord. However, Last quickly regenerates himself, prompting Yui to also unleash a destructive spell onto him, but he again easily recovers. Hijiri once more tries to attack him, but the White Demon Lord simply reflects her magic onto them, excluding Arata and Lilith. Hijiri tries to convince her cousin to depart, but Last constructs a barrier around the academy to seal them within. With the group unable to escape, Last Trinity continues to absorb more of Arata's magic, intending to defeat him and his friends.

Meanwhile, Akio struggles to defend herself from the Code D dragon's onslaught, eventually exhausting her magic and transforming into her younger self. Nevertheless, Levi and Lugh work together to inflict significant damage while the members of Grimoire Security deal the final strike on the dragon. However, in spite of the victory, the girls wonder about Arata and the others' situation. As Last Trinity taunts Lilith while the injured are unable to move, Arata orders her to escape but she refuses. In response, Last prepares his next strike which prompts the alchemist to protect Arata with her body in spite of his insistence. However, he realizes that he has encountered the situation before, before recalling that Lilim possesses both Lilith and his magic. After groping Lilith's bottom, Arata retrieves Hermes to regain his magic but Last Trinity attempts to interfere by firing his spell. Regardless, the Demon Lord Candidate invokes the Luxuria magic through the grimoire, causing a blinding light to appear... Both Arata and Lilith find themselves in an unknown space when Lilim reveals that they are currently inside her after the former invoked the latter's magic. Arata was able to connect to her because she possesses her magic despite the risks, but Sora warns that if he retrieves his magic, she will revert to her unconscious state. Nevertheless, Lilim is willing to accept her fate although she eventually admits that she wishes to remain together with everyone. As such, the group resolve to find a solution before continuing their next move.

Returning to the moment as Last Trinity's spell is about to strike, Arata manages to deflect the attack using his partially transformed arm. Although, Hijiri notes that his magic does not come from the Demon Lord before Arata and Lilith invoke their magic from the Luxuria Archive. As such, Arata transforms into a Paladin using the magic from Hermes Apocrypha, becoming capable of defeating Last using alchemy. However, he White Demon Lord refuses to accept the situation and once more unleashes his magic onto them, prompting Arata and Lilith to retaliate in return which overwhelms Last Trinity and his barrier. Observing from afar, Master Liber discusses with the Headmaster on Arata becoming a Paladin which the latter happily comments on his Demon Lord Candidate and the Trinity Seven's growth. Liber can only contemplate the extent of Biblia's plan and research. Believing that the conflict has been concluded, the two parties reunite before planning to eliminate the Breakdown Phenomenon. However, Last Trinity begins to resurrect himself, refusing to surrender his ambitions to become the Demon Lord. Nonetheless, Arata pities the White Demon Lord's state, requesting to the girls to support him in ending the Trinity's misery, which they all willingly accept. As each member unleashes their magic, Last Trinity is unable to prevent his destruction, disappearing after Arata assures him that he will become the Demon Lord so the homunculus can rest in peace. With the Breakdown Phenomenon vanquished, the party celebrates their victory as the sun rises, but Lilim unfortunately begins to disappear. Promising to reunite in the future, Lilim bids her parents farewell before reverting to her grimoire form. With the situation resolved, Arata releases his Paladin form but in the processes, causes everyone's clothes to fall apart, much to Lilith's chagrin. In an undisclosed location, two girls discusses the recent events, particularly Arata's strength as a Demon Lord Candidate. The one named Ana suggests to her friend Arsha that they meet with him next which the latter accepts, much to the former's happiness.

== Voice cast ==
Character	Japanese
Arata Kasuga	Yoshitsugu Matsuoka
Lilith Asami	Yumi Hara
Arin Kannazuki	Aya Uchida
Levi Kazama	Ayane Sakura
Mira Yamana	Yōko Hikasa
Akio Fudo	Ryoka Yuzuki
Yui Kurata	Rie Murakawa
Lieselotte Sherlock	Nao Tōyama
Selina Sherlock	Aya Suzaki
Sora	Rie Kugimiya
Hijiri Kasuga	Ayaka Suwa
Master Biblia	Miki Shinichiro
Ilias Fragment	Chinatsu Akasaki
Lugh	Ayaka Fukuhara
Lilim	Rina Hidaka
Last Trinity	Nobunaga Shimazaki
Anastasia-L	M.A.O
Master Akarsha	Yoshino Nanjo

== Production ==
=== Development ===
A film adaptation of the manga series was announced in the Monthly Dragon Age magazine's August 2016 issue in July 2016. The cast and staff from the anime series returned to reprise their roles in the film.

=== Music ===
On November 7, 2016, the official website announced that ZAQ would be performing the opening theme, Last Proof, with the single scheduled to be released on January 25, 2017.

On February 25, 2017, the musical duo Polka Dots, consisting of i☆Ris member Himika Akaneya and Mimi Meme MIMI member Yuki Takao, was announced to perform their debut song "Lost Days -Piano ver.-" as insert, releasing on the same day as well. Notably, Akaneya provided the lyrics while Takao composed the music.

== Release ==
The film was released in theaters in Japan on February 25, 2017. Crunchyroll licensed the film, and streamed on its website on March 17, 2017.

== Marketing ==
On December 6, 2016, 777 limited seven-ticket set was announced to be on sale at the theaters starting December 17.
