= Trinity Seven =

Japanese manga series and its franchise

- Cover of Trinity Seven: 7-nin no Masho Tsukai volume 1 published by Fujimi Shobo, featuring Lilith Asami.

トリニティセブン 7人の魔書使い (Toriniti Sebun: Shichi-nin no Masho Tsukai)
- Genre: Harem; Romantic comedy; Urban fantasy
- Manga
- Written by: Kenji Saitō
- Illustrated by: Akinari Nao
- Published by: Fujimi Shobo
- English publisher: NA: Yen Press
- Magazine: Monthly Dragon Age
- Original run: December 9, 2010 – Present
- Volumes: 35
- Anime television series
- Directed by: Hiroshi Nishikiori
- Produced by: Kouichi Sakamoto; Yoshikazu Beniya; Shuuichi Takashino; Tooru Awaji; Yuusaku Noguchi; Tomokazu Iizumi; Takeshi Ishigaki; Hiroyuki Tajima; Mika Shimizu; Ryousuke Naya; Ryou Yasumura
- Written by: Hiroyuki Yoshino
- Music by: Technoboys Pulcraft Green-Fund
- Studio: Seven Arcs Pictures
- Licensed by: AUS: Madman Entertainment; NA: Sentai Filmworks; UK: Manga Entertainment
- Original network: TV Tokyo, TVA, TVO, AT-X
- Original run: October 8, 2014 – December 24, 2014
- Episodes: 12 + OVA
Further information
Light novel
Written by	Kenji Saitō
Illustrated by	Akinari Nao
Published by	Kadokawa Shoten
Original run	November 8, 2014 – January 9, 2018
Volumes	3
Anime film
The Eternal Library and the Alchemist Girl
Directed by	Hiroshi Nishikiori
Produced by	Yoshikazu Beniya; Mika Shimizu; Ryousuke Naya; Ryou Yasumura; Daisuke Masaki; Shigeki Hosoda; Shunsuke Matsumura; Yuuya Yoshida; Yoshifumi Matsuda
Written by	Kenji Saitou
Music by	Technoboys Pulcraft Green-Fund
Studio	Seven Arcs Pictures
Released	February 25, 2017
Runtime	55 minutes
Anime film
Heavens Library & Crimson Lord
Directed by	Hiroshi Nishikiori
Produced by	Daisuke Masaki; Yoshifumi Matsuda; Takema Okamura; Miho Ichii; Aya Iizuka; Ryou Hino; Tomotaka Satou
Written by	Kenji Saitou
Music by	Technoboys Pulcraft Green-Fund
Studio	Seven Arcs Pictures
Released	March 29, 2019
Runtime	60 minutes
Video games
Trinity Seven: Phantasm Library & Seventh Sol (2019)
icon

Trinity Seven (Japanese: トリニティセブン 7人の魔書使い, Hepburn: Toriniti Sebun: Shichi-nin no Masho Tsukai; literally "Trinity Seven: The Seven Magicians") is a fantasy romantic comedy manga series written by Kenji Saitō and illustrated by Akinari Nao. It has been serialized in Fujimi Shobo's shōnen manga magazine Monthly Dragon Age since 2010 and collected in thirty-five tankōbon volumes as of November 2026.

A light novel adaptation by Kenji Saitō with illustrations by Akinari Nao is being published by Kadokawa Shoten, and the first volume was released in November 2014. An anime television series adaptation by Seven Arcs Pictures aired on TV Tokyo from October to December 2014. An anime film adaptation titled Trinity Seven the Movie: The Eternal Library and the Alchemist Girl premiered in February 2017. A second film adaptation titled Trinity Seven: Heavens Library & Crimson Lord premiered in March 2019.

== Plot ==
Arata Kasuga lived a normal life together with his cousin and childhood friend Hijiri Kasuga in a small town. However, everything changes on the day of the Black Sun, which caused the Breakdown Phenomenon which destroys the town where he lived and takes Hijiri away. As Hijiri starts disappearing, she hangs a grimoire around his neck, asking it to protect Kasuga. Shattered by losing Hijiri and all of his other friends and family, Arata asks for his world to be good again, which leads to the grimoire artificially reconstructing his normal life and making him forget both the destruction of the city and Hijiri's disappearance. Lilith Asami, a mage, is sent to investigate the ruins, and she finds the powerful spell in their stead. She makes Arata remember the actual events, and consequently the spell is broken, but not without the grimoire telling him that Hijiri is still alive. Arata decides that his only option is to become a mage himself so he could rescue Hijiri, and so he joins the Royal Biblia Academy, a secret school for mages that deals with magical issues around the world. There he is introduced to the Trinity Seven, seven powerful mages who are at the top of their respective fields (Lilith being one of them) and who will help him in his goal of becoming a powerful magician and learning the truth about Hijiri and the Black Sun. He soon finds out that one of the Trinity Seven, Arin, looks almost exactly like his missing cousin, although she shows a completely different personality.

== Media ==
=== Manga ===
The series was serialized in Fujimi Shobo's shōnen manga magazine Monthly Dragon Age since 2010. The first complied volume was released on July 7, 2011. On October 10, 2014, Yen Press announced at their New York Comic Con panel that they licensed Trinity Seven for release in North America, with the first volume releasing on May 19, 2015.

A spin-off manga written by Saito and illustrated by Sutarō Hanao, titled Trinity Seven: Levi Ninden (トリニティセブン レヴィ忍伝), launched in Dragon Age on November 9, 2015, and ended on December 9, 2016. Chako Abeno launched a second spin-off, titled Trinity Seven: Liese Chronicle (トリニティセブン リーゼクロニクル), in Dragon Age on February 9, 2017. The manga ended on June 9, 2018.

=== Light novel ===
On November 4, 2014, a spinoff light novel adaptation of Trinity Seven was announced. It was written by Kenji Saito and illustrated by Akinari Nao. The novel series covered the past of the main characters, and events not yet shown in the manga. The first novel was released on November 8, 2014, titled Trinity Seven The Novel: Night Episode and Lost Memory. The second novel, titled Trinity Seven The Novel: Eternity Library and Alchemic Girl, was released on December 29, 2014. The third novel, titled Trinity Seven The Novel: Holy Shrine Maiden and the Eighth Library, was released on January 9, 2018.

No.	Title	Release date	ISBN
1	Trinity Seven The Novel: Night Episode and Lost Memory (トリニティセブン 7人の魔書使い The Novel 深夜挿話(ナイトエピソード)と過去記憶(ロストメモリー) Naito Episōdo to Rosuto Memorī)	November 8, 2014	978-4-0407-0267-4
2	Trinity Seven The Novel: Eternity Library and Alchemic Girl (トリニティセブン 7人の魔書使い The Novel 悠久図書館(エターニティライブラリー)と錬金術少女(アルケミックガール))	December 29, 2014	978-4-0407-0352-7
3	Trinity Seven The Novel: Holy Shrine Maiden and the Eighth Library (トリニティセブン 7人の魔書使い The Novel 聖なる巫女と八番目の書庫)	January 9, 2018	978-4-04-072570-3

=== Anime ===
An anime television series adaptation by Seven Arcs Pictures aired on TV Tokyo from October 7 to December 23, 2014, and other channels on TVA, TVO and AT-X. The series is directed by Hiroshi Nishikiori and Hiroyuki Yoshino is in charge of series composition. The series has been licensed by Sentai Filmworks in North America, while Madman Entertainment holds the license for Australia and Animatsu Entertainment in the United Kingdom.

No.	Title	Original release date
1	"Administer and Third Selection" "Adominisutā to Sādo Serekushon" (魔王候補(アドミニスター)と第三の選択(サードセレクション))	October 7, 2014
In a dream, Arata floats in total darkness but sees Hijiri running and attempts to grab her hand, accidentally groping his cousin Hijiri who has come to wake him up for school. On their way, Arata remarks that he is content with his normal, peaceful life before noticing the black sun overhead. At the same time, Arata and Hijiri pass by Lilith, who commands Arata to awaken. On the roof of the school, Arata asks Hijiri about the black sun and she assures him that it has always been that way, even before he was born. Arata deduces Hijiri is a fake because her old drawings boasted a red sun. Lilith appears and attacks the fake Hijiri. The fake Hijiri dispels the magic around Arata and reveals that his city was destroyed three days ago by a gravitational fluctuation breakdown phenomenon. He recalls the real Hijiri handing him a grimoire before kissing him and disappearing into the void. Arata used the grimoire to recreate his peaceful life before the breakdown phenomenon. Lilith offers Arata two choices: die, or hand over the grimoire, which has manifested as the fake Hijiri, and have his memories erased. The grimoire reveals that Hijiri is still alive and Arata resolves to become a mage in hopes of saving her. On his first day at the Royal Biblia Academy, Arata discovers those mages of Demon Lord class can create worlds. The academy's headmaster welcomes Arata, describing what mages do, and tells him that in order to save Hijiri, he will need the help of the Trinity Seven, of which Lilith is a member. Arata also meets Trinity Seven's Levi Kazama and sees Akio Fudo and Mira Yamana from the window. Later that night, Arata runs into another Trinity Seven member, Arin Kannazuki in the men's bath.
2	"Prison Lock and Grimoire Security" "Purizun Rokku to Gurimowāru Sekyuriti" (空間閉鎖(プリズンロック)と王立図書館検察官(グリモワールセキュリティ))	October 14, 2014
The next day, Arin begins following Arata, claiming that she is destined to marry the Demon Lord. Arata later finds Selina, Lilith, and Levi in his room. Selina and Levi tease Lilith about giving Arata private lessons when he asks for more information about magic and his grimoire, the legendary Astil Codex. Lilith begins describing the Archive-Thema magical research system when the lights go out and the four are trapped by a magical seal. Arata's calm approach impresses the girls, but they quickly run out of the ideas and all of the girls start having the urge to use the bathroom. Running out of ideas, Arata tricks his grimoire into revealing where the seal is, allowing them to escape. Arin confesses to trapping Arata explaining she wanted to see him create a breakdown phenomenon to study the destructive potential. Arin then activates her Thema's Magus Mode to break the grimoire's control over Arata's power, creating a Breakdown Phenomenon. Lilith moves to kill Arata to stop the phenomenon, but Arin interferes. Grimoire Security members, Mira and Akio, arrive and attack Arata after learning he is the cause of the Breakdown Phenomenon.
3	"Magus and Alchemist" "Meigasu to Arukemisuto" (魔道士(メイガス)と錬金術(アルケミスト))	October 21, 2014
In actuality, Trinity Seven's Yui dragged Arata into her dream world before Akio could kill him but that has allowed the breakdown phenomenon to continue. Yui educates Arata about magic, the archives (Superbia, Invidia, Ira, Acedia, Avaritia, Gula and Luxuria), and themas. She also suggests that Arata may be able to control the phenomenon and his powers in choosing his thema. Arata returns to the real world just as the Trinity Seven are about to fall to the phenomenon and unleashes his Magus mode, driven by the thema Impel to control the flow of magic and dispel the phenomenon. His anti-magic spell also destroyed the girls' clothes, as they were magical manifestations of their themas. Mira was spared, as she reflected the spell back onto Arata. In present day, due to the damage the breakdown phenomenon caused, the students of the academy are sent to a southern island while repairs are underway. Arata and Arin have to service the other students as punishment for their experimentation. Selina, Levi, and Lilith quibble over their swimsuits and bust sizes. Arata and Selina demonstrate their respective magic techniques, much to Selina's embarrassment at having her clothes destroyed. Later that night, Selina, Levi, Lilith, Arin, and Arata talk at the mixed-gender hot springs about magic and improving Arata's abilities. Arata requests that Lilith demonstrate her magic so he may learn how to manifest a gun to better control his own magic. After witnessing her Outer Alchemic spell, Arata asks his grimoire to copy the spell for him, which works out successfully, surprising the entire group.
4	"Labyrinth and Magic Gunner" "Rabirinsu to Majikku Gannā" (巨大迷宮(ラビリンス)と魔銃起動(マジックガンナー))	October 28, 2014
Arata and Lilith return to class to find the other students asleep at their desks, victims of another breakdown phenomenon. The academy headmaster suggests that the Trinity Seven and Arata work together to investigate and deal with the phenomenon, though Mira rejects working with Arata and sets off with Akio. The headmaster pinpoints the breakdown's source underneath the school, where Yui is losing control of her magic in the presence of a demon lord candidate. Arata, Lilith, Levi, and Arin hurry down to the dungeon to stop Mira and Akio from killing Yui to stop the phenomenon. In the dungeon, they encounter several demons, but Arata struggles to realize his grimoire into a working gun like before and accidentally dispels Lilith and Arin's Magus mode before Levi dispatches the demons. Arin eliminated more demons with her Chaosic Rune magic which Arata attempts and fails to copy to his grimoire. They catch up to Mira and Akio and Levi stays back to stall them. Arata, Arin, and Lilith find Yui's room guarded by a Code D Phantasmal Dragon and Arata is incapacitated. Mira, Akio, and Levi catch up and battle the monster. After talking with Arata, Levi manages to get him to concentrate and properly utilize his copied gun magic to kill the dragon and stop the breakdown phenomenon. Yui awakens and latches onto Arata to Lilith's dismay.
5	"Dream World and Sub-Administer" "Dorīmu Wārudo to Sabu Adominisutā" (夢の世界(ドリームワールド)と第ニの魔王候補(サブアドミニスター))	November 4, 2014
Arata wakes up to Yui and Arin sleeping beside him naked before Lilith comes to his room to wake him up. During physical exercise class, Yui and Arin cling to Arata while he watches the girls running. Mira and Akio appear, and Mira warns Yui that if she loses control again, Mira will have to take her out. Selina shows up and concludes that the four of them are fighting over Arata. Lilith and Levi appear with Lilith assuring Arata the girls aren't fighting over him, while Levi gets excited to fight against Akio. Everyone except Mira and Lilith activates their Magus Mode, but the fight is cut short as Yui uses her magic and transports everyone to her dream world. Before leaving the dream world, Arata tells Yui he will be her friend, which pleases her and she kisses Arata as thanks for saving her. Later in the bath, Akio and Mira talk about all the breakdown phenomena happening recently. That night, during a thunderstorm, windows in the Academy are broken and a long-haired blonde girl is shown smirking, before disappearing. In the morning, Mira investigates the scene and identifies magical traces similar to those involved in an incident of "that library." While learning about the prior incident where a student disappeared and investigating the academy library, Arata, Selina, and the Trinity Seven are transported to the Eternal Library. There, Lieselotte Sherlock, Selina's older twin sister and final member of the Trinity Seven, appears before the group. She attempts to steal magic power from Lilith and Mira but is foiled by Levi and Akio. Lieselotte explains her motives behind seeking out the Eternal Library and explains to Arata that acquiring Demon Lord powers is equal to committing taboo. She sought out the demon lord element in the Eternal Library and absorbs Selina's magic, becoming a Demon Lord candidate.
6	"Dark Mage and Big Event" "Dāku Meiji to Biggu Ibento" (悪の魔道士(ダークメイジ)と学園襲撃(ビッグイベント))	November 11, 2014
Lieselotte claims that it is the ultimate dream of every mage to be a demon lord, but rejects Lilith's notion that it can only be done through diligent study. Having stolen Selina's research, Lieselotte understands Arata would be a difficult opponent, and offers an alliance, claiming it is the fastest way for him to save Hijiri. Levi and Akio attempt to interfere, but Lieselotte's new strength prevents them from acting as she kisses Arata, stealing most of his magic. Lieselotte uses Arata's anti-magic ability to dispel everyone's Magus modes except Mira and Levi who fight against Lieselotte. Levi fights to buy time for Mira's White Universe attack, but are unable to injure Lieselotte. Meanwhile, Selina and Arata are still struggling as, without magic, mages cease to exist. As Lieselotte is unaccustomed to her new powers, her demon wings slow her down and Levi is able to land a few blows before Lieselotte retreats to stabilize her magic. As the students return to the academy, Mira tasks Akio with training Arata on using Mantra Element. While Arata trains, Yui, Arin, and Lilith watch over Selina in the infirmary. Suddenly, Lieselotte attacks the academy, causing a breakdown phenomenon that drains the magic from the other students before the Headmaster steps in. Lieselotte appears before the Headmaster and attempts to fight him, though her efforts are rebuffed with ease.
7	"Lost Technica and Problem Solving" "Rosuto Tekunika to Puroburemu Soruvingu" (秘奥義(ロストテクニカ)と異変解決(プロブレム・ソルヴィング))	November 18, 2014
Having gained enough magic power, Lieselotte is able to observe the Headmaster's fearsome grimoire, Solomon's Gate. Unable to defeat his magic, Lieselotte exposes herself and distracts the perverted Headmaster to escape, although he warns her that evil mages are invariably defeated after they obtain great power. The Astil Codex reveals to Arata, Mira, and Akio that it has already copied Mantra Enchant, but because it is not a weapon manifestation, it will have manifest itself as a human, Sora, to properly utilize Akio's technique. Akio reveals that Mantra Enchant's strength depends on the magic and will of its user, before lending Arata most of her magic. Lieselotte attacks the infirmary and is briefly detained by a simple rope trap. Arata arrives and reclaims his magic power from Lieselotte in a surprise attack. However, he and Sora are unable to keep up with Lieselotte's speed but Lieselotte is unable to injure Arata due to Mantra Enchant. As a last-ditch effort, Lieselotte unleashes her Lost Technica Baal Peor to freeze time. She kisses Arata again to drain his magic but inadvertently allows Mantra Enchant to enter her body and expunge her demon lord element. Arata embraces Lieselotte, reminding her Selina and the Trinity Seven want her to return, but she reveals she cannot leave Baal Peor. Arata promises to rescue her before Lieselotte returns everyone to reality. Mira calculates Arata is close to mastery of Logos Art and instructs Selina to train Arata in order to rescue Lieselotte. The Headmaster remarks on their growth and is alerted to the complete destruction of the magical academy in the west by Iscariot, the evil mages.
8	"Study and Holiday" "Sutadi to Horidei" (魔道勉強(スタディ)と安息日(ホリデイ))	November 25, 2014
Arata diligently studies magic from all of the Trinity Seven to be able to rescue Lieselotte as soon as possible, but Lilith cautions him as rapid growth runs the risk of losing control of his magic. Lilith and Arata are summoned to the Headmaster, where Arata is appointed to Grimoire Security #2 with Lilith as a chaperone for an upcoming mission to the ruins of the Royal Liber Magic Academy. As such, Lilith promises to tutor Arata, but is embarrassed when asked about her mastery over the Luxuria (Lust) archive. Lilith trains Arata throughout the day until she falls asleep. Mira and Akio visit to check on his studying and explain the Liber Academy was destroyed in a breakdown phenomenon during Lieselotte's attack. Mira is startled by a bug, landing on top of Arata and rousing Lilith. Arata, Sora, Selina, and the Trinity Seven enjoy the hot springs before their mission; Lilith takes Arata to a secluded part of the baths overlooking the city and they share a moment, before Sora stealthily removes Lilith's bikini. For their mission, the Headmaster teleports Arata, Lilith, Sora, Mira, and Akio to the Royal Liber Academy but the teleport is disrupted, and Arata, Sora and Mira are separated from Lilith and Akio. Arata, Sora and Mira find themselves standing in front of an intact Liber Academy, but Sora detects world creation magic. The three are greeted by someone who looks like Hijiri but Mira and Sora determine her to be yet another fake.
9	"Bible Battle and Sweet Memory" "Baiburu Batoru to Suīto Memorī" (魔道書戦闘(バイブルバトル)と過去記憶(スイートメモリー))	December 2, 2014
Sora reveals the Hijiri they just saw was actually Hijiri's grimoire, the "Iliad Fragment," manifesting in human form. Sora also determines that Liber Academy is isolated in another dimension and that the three of them are trapped. They encounter demons in the school, but when Mira goes into Magus mode, her clothes are destroyed instead. Sora deals with the demons as her magic is not bound by the Archives and Magus mode and encounters Ilia while Arata and Mira escape. Sora unleashes a powerful magical attack at Ilia but she evades and traps Sora in a dimensional box. Arata decides to search the center of the school for the barrier's core and Mira accompanies him to the clock tower. While climbing the tower, Arata asks about Mira's past and she reveals she was a loner, afraid her magic would hurt those around her, until she met Akio who helped Mira become a more confident person. At the top of the clock tower, they discover Sora trapped in the box and Ilia, who seeks to kill Mira and live with Arata forever. Sora telepathically communicates with Arata and asks him to buy time until Sora can disable the barrier. Arata offers himself up, provided Ilia is willing to let Mira go. Ilia agrees and also reveals that the current Hijiri aims to destroy the world in order to recreate it a more peaceful world. Although she agreed to the deal, Ilia binds Arata to a pillar and commands the demons to kill Mira, explaining that there is no way to send an individual out of the barrier. She also begins draining Sora's magic to sustain the barrier. Frustrated at his powerlessness, Arata unleashes his demon lord element Astral Trinity and wrests control over the world from Ilia.
10	"Game Master and Satan Slave" "Gēmu Masutā to Seitan Sureibu" (支配者(ゲームマスター)と憤怒の魔人(セイタンスレイヴ))	December 9, 2014
Astral Trinity effortlessly dispels Ilia's magic and frees Sora, while simultaneously creates a breakdown phenomenon to demonstrate the extent of his control. With Ilia's seal broken, Mira is able to access her Magus mode and attacks the demon lord with Sora, but are easily defeated. Astral Trinity propositions Mira, but she slaps him, disrupting the demon lord's control over Arata's body and allowing Sora to suppress and reseal the demon lord element. Unwilling to kill Ilia, Arata requests she release the barrier, but she is unable to as she lost control when the demon lord surfaced. With the help of the two grimoires and Mira, Arata destroys the black sun, ending the breakdown phenomenon and also destroying the barrier, dropping them off in front of the destroyed Liber Academy. They reunite with Lilith and Akio before Arata collapses from exertion with the real Hijiri watching from above. While Arata rests, Hijiri invades his room, intending to kill him before he gets stronger. Lilith saves him, though Hijiri is unharmed as she also possesses extreme magical power and a demon lord element that allows her to surpass the strength granted by Magus mode. Hijiri is able to manifest as the Trinity Satan, having mastered the Ruina, Partum, and Analysis Themas within the Ira archive. Just as Hijiri is about to kill Lilith and Arata, Arin arrives with the demon spear Gae Bulg and neutralizes Hijiri's Black Azazel attack. Hijiri teleports out of the room and to Biblia Academy with the rest of Iscariot to destroy the school. Though still magic-depleted, Arata insists that they return to school immediately to help out Levi and Yui.
11	"Fianna Knights and Sisters" "Fiana Naitsu to Shisutāzu" (光輝剣士(フィアナナイツ)と姉妹の絆(シスターズ))	December 16, 2014
Lugh, another mage from Iscariot, begins an aerial bombardment of the academy. In order to protect the students, Levi goes out to confront Lugh while Yui pulls everyone into her dream world for safety. However, Lugh is stronger than Levi and she injures her arm. Though Levi is able to land a hit, Lugh badly injures her in response as Levi is too slow to dodge the blades. Distressed at Levi's injury, Yui almost loses control over her dream world. In a desperate move, Levi casts Leviathan as her Last Crest, obscuring Lugh's vision with tornadoes. Though Lugh is easily able to dispel the magic, she realizes Levi and the Headmaster used the opportunity to escape and heal. Back at Liber Academy, Arata and the others discover the teleportation device is destroyed and it would take too long to repair or travel to a different portal. Lugh tracks Levi down within the school but is surprised by an attack and trapped within Levi's Shadow Threads. Lugh then reveals she has attained Trinity, having acquired the legendary weapons for Virtus, Faith, and Solvo, as well as become a demon lord candidate while striking and gravely wounding Levi. In order to keep the dream world intact, Selina volunteers to fight and immediately binds Lugh, although it is unable to hold her for Selina to heal Levi. Lugh blasts Selina and Levi but is interrupted by Lieselotte, who has bodyswapped with Selina. Lieselotte uses her greater magic to freeze Lugh, who is forced to sacrifice her Virtus Arm weapon to free herself. Lieselotte tricks Lugh and is able to heal Levi, who takes out her Solvo Wings. Backed in a corner, Lugh summons Hijiri, but Lilith manages to transport everyone back for a final stand.
12	"Criminal Girl and His World" "Kuriminaru Gāru to Hizu Wārudo" (聖戦少女(クリミナルガール)と魔王世界(ヒズワールド))	December 23, 2014
After a brief conversation between everyone, Arata and the Trinity Seven activate their Magus modes while the Headmasters of Biblia and Liber observe from above. Akio and Yui team up and destroy Lugh's last legendary weapon while the others work to counter Hijiri's techniques. Mira deflects Hijiri's first attack, but only Arin can dispel the defensive abilities in place. Hijiri strikes at Arin, but Levi uses a warp to protect her and get Arin close enough to strike. With the opening Arin's Mistilteinn created, Lilith and Arata combine magics to defeat Hijiri and consume the demon lord element. Having seen a vision of Arata becoming the demon lord and destroying the world with the help of the Trinity Seven, Hijiri became an Iscariot mage to defeat the demon lord and recreate the world, breaking the loop of world creation and destruction at the hands of the demon lord. Hijiri also reveals that she has no physical body as she collapses into a crystal and is reclaimed by the leader of Iscariot Master Liber. After the battle, Lilith invites Arata on a trip to the city and are stalked by Yui, Selina, Levi, and Arin. At the end of the day, Arata gifts Lilith an anti-magic amulet to protect her while Lilith and the others profess their love for Arata.

=== OVA ===
No.	Title	Original release date
1	"Trinity Seven and Special Lesson!" "Torinitisebun to tokubetsu jugyō!" (トリニティセブンと特別授業!)	March 25, 2015
Arata is found to be failing and is up for expulsion, however he is given a special assignment in order to have his expulsion revoked. He needs to go to each of the Trinity Seven and get a special lesson from each one of them. First he goes to Liese in order to receive a lesson on the sin "sloth". However she attempts to seduce him but is interrupted by Lilith. Arata and Sora runs out of the nurses's office only to meet Yui. She decided to take him into her dream world and attempts to seduce him as well. However she is stopped when Arata decides to tell her that she has a lot of friends and does not need to rely on him only. She then proceeds to tell him about the sin "Greed". As the day progresses he is visited by Akio in the bath while she tells him all about Gluttony. The scene jumps to Arata and Arin in Arata's room. They are talking about wrath. Arin attempts to show Arata wrath by kissing him and making Lilith angry. Arata goes to visit Mira however when he entered he finds her in the middle of changing. Thus results in him getting hit. Mira proceeds to teach him about pride. Lilith then goes to visit Arata's room to teach him about lust. However is interrupted when Levi shows him the envy that resides in Lilith's heart when she realized that he had to go visit every girl. The episode ends with Levi and Arata running away from Mira and Lilith.

=== Films ===
A film adaptation of the manga series was announced in the Monthly Dragon Age magazine's August 2016 issue in July 2016. The cast and staff from the anime series returned to reprise their roles in the film. The film, titled Trinity Seven the Movie: The Eternal Library and the Alchemist Girl, premiered on February 25, 2017.

On July 3, 2018, the official website of the manga announced that a second film adaptation is in production. The second film, titled Trinity Seven: Heavens Library & Crimson Lord (トリニティセブン, Trinity Seven: Tenkū Toshokan to Shinku no Maō), premiered on March 29, 2019. The cast and staff from the anime series returned to reprise their roles in the second film.

== Reception ==
As of June 2017, the manga has over three million copies in print.

== See also ==
- Saint Seiya: Meiō Iden – Dark Wing—Another manga series by the same author
- I'm Standing on a Million Lives—Another manga series by the same illustrator
