= List of Val × Love episodes =

- The key visual of anime.
- No. of episodes: 12

Release
- Original network: AT-X, Tokyo MX, SUN, BS11
- Original release: October 5 – December 21, 2019

Val × Love is an anime series adapted from the manga of the same title by Ryousuke Asakura. Takashi Naoya directed the series at Hoods Entertainment with Tatsuya Takahashi written the scripts, and Kiyoshi Tateishi designed the characters and TECHNOBOYS PULCRAFT GREEN-FUND composed the music. It aired from October 5, 2019, to December 21, 2019, on AT-X, Tokyo MX, SUN, and BS11. The opening theme is "for..." performed by Rikako Aida, while the ending theme is "Up-Date x Please!!!" in three groups with three versions by the cast of the nine Saotome sisters. Sentai Filmworks has licensed the series and streamed it on Hidive. It ran for 12 episodes.

== Episodes ==
No.	Title (Note: All English titles are taken from Hidive.)	Original release date
1	"The Fighting Maiden"; Transliteration: "Tatakau Otome" (Japanese: 戦う乙女)	October 5, 2019
At school Natsuki Saotome is complemented by her classmates, as opposed to Takuma Akutsu. Who easily scares others because of his personality and nicknamed a "demon." He has a phobia of talking to people. However, arriving at home Natsuki and her sisters, Itsuyo and Mutsumi are living under the same roof as him. Along with 6 other sisters. After dinner, Takuma and Natsuki went to study together, but Takuma tried to find ways to study alone leading into an awkward argument with her. Futaba walks in and asked them to buy something from the store, but while walking to there a demon shows up. Natsuki told Takuma to run away, but he protected her from the demon's attack and Natsuki performed a ritual with him to become a Valkyrie and defeated the demon. Takuma recalls when Odin talking to him and met the Saotome sisters.
2	"The Binding Maiden"; Transliteration: "Shibaru Otome" (Japanese: 縛る乙女)	October 12, 2019
Starting from the last episode, Natsuki reminded Takuma, about his late mother's wishes. The next day, the exam results was shown at school as Natsuki and Mutsumi were surprised by how much Itsuyo had on the exam. While as Takuma's grades were low because of his phobia. Itsuyo has taken the role of student council president, and pursued Takuma to get close to him. She uses her Valkyrie skill to tie up Takuma in a bind. Which she tries to perform a ritual with him, but fails each time. Natsuki, Itsuyo, and Mutsumi made a barrier to trap a demon inside. Meanwhile, Natsuki suggested to Itsuyo to get closer with Takuma and complete the ritual. While she distracts the demon and Itsuyo will assist her in defeating it. Takuma and Itsuyo retried completing the ritual, until Itsuyo remembered her father pat her head and noticed Takuma was doing the same. Itsuyo became a Valkyrie and defeated the demon.
3	"The Secret Maiden"; Transliteration: "Himitsu no Otome" (Japanese: 秘密の乙女)	October 19, 2019
Mutsumi finished a TV commercial and wanted to go on a date with Takuma, but a fellow customer at the cafe was bragging about meeting Mutsumi, who is an idol. The customer got scared by Takuma's looks and caught everyone's attention. Afterwards, they went to a bookstore, while Tohru Inukai spies on them from afar. Meanwhile, the Saotome sisters were talking among themselves about Takuma and Mutsumi's date. As they left the bookstore, Mutsumi was spotted by one of her fans. Takuma and Mutsumi left and ran into a narrow hallway and hid in a locker. While hiding from Mutsumi's fans, Takuma performed a ritual with her and became a Valkyrie. They escaped from there and flew to see the sunset. Until she used up her power. Meanwhile, Tohru was finishing eating a meal and approached by someone to defeat the Saotome sisters. But offered to eat together and wait for the right time to defeat them.
4	"The Serving Maiden"; Transliteration: "Hōshi suru Otome" (Japanese: 奉仕する乙女)	October 26, 2019
Takuma arrived at home from taking a test and it made him tired. Misa wanted to exercise and thought of playing tag. But Takuma still wanted to study instead. He gave in and agreed to play too. While the Saotome sisters drew sticks and who had a red stick is "it." Futaba took the stick and gave everyone a head start. Misa, Takuma, and Itsuyo briefly talked about Futaba's "Castle." Until they were found by her and Misa threw Takuma up in the sky and fell on top on Yakumo. Natsuki then tries to think of a strategy, as Futaba found them, Yakumo and Natsuki tries to fight back Futaba and Takuma ran to a storehouse. To find Shino hiding inside and gave advice to him. Futaba then finds Takuma and gave him a charm. Much to his surprise, later the Saotome sisters were talking about how fun tag was and that the school festival is coming up soon. At school, Natsuki was asked by her classmates to cover for someone, who was sick. To wear a maid outfit and Tohru commented about her speech to the class. Then he thought of an idea involving Takuma and Natsuki. This later made the rest of the class jealous and demons suddenly appeared. Takuma punches the demons and defeats them. Meanwhile, Tohru observed them and left.
5	"The Believing Maiden"; Transliteration: "Shinjiru Otome" (Japanese: 信じる乙女)	November 2, 2019
Takuma arrives at the campus festival with Yakumo and gone to a maid cafe. Yakumo wanted him to do something as Natsuki was watching him drink from a spilled cup. Until Natsuki stopped her as the rest of the Saotome sisters arrived to the festival. Meanwhile, Natsuki was speaking to Futaba and the sisters wanted to be at the campus festival to get closer to Takuma. For them to power up their Valkyrie skills. Takuma, Misa, and Kururi walked into a haunted house. Kururi got scared by a fishing rod that was holding an eel and it hid under Misa's clothes and Takuma caught it. After Takuma got rid of the eel, Tohru talked to him about the festival. The Saotome sisters then finds demons showing up at the festival and trying to find Takuma. But Tohru (in his demon form) has taken him as a hostage. He remembers his promise with his mother and the short conversation with Natsuki. Takuma wakes up and fights Tohru but he fends off his attack. Futaba shows up and Tohru tries to speak to her about finding him wounded. She then fights him, while seeing through his bluff.
6	"The Naked Maiden"; Transliteration: "Hadaka no Otome" (Japanese: 裸の乙女)	November 9, 2019
Futaba fights Tohru and tells Takuma to get to Natsuki. However, Tohru used his demon power to cut Takuma in half. As Takuma was cut, a mysterious power awakens called Mistiltein and it heals Takuma back. Tohru was surprised and Futaba distracts him for Takuma to run away. He runs to find for help but his classmates are possessed by demons. They try to attack Takuma but Mistiltein continues to heal him. He meets up with Natsuki to perform a ritual for her Valkyrie powers to be upgraded. By being nude and kissing for 5 minutes. While the rest of the Saotome sisters fend off the demons. Futaba then attacks Tohru to a point that he retreated. Tohru was approached by the same boy who talked to him at the restaurant and scolded him for not finishing off the Saotome sisters. Everyone in the school has awakened up and the festival continues with a beauty contest. Later in the evening Itsuyo and Mutsumi gave up their right to dance with Takuma, leaving Natsuki the only one left. The next day, Takuma wanted to thank Natsuki for dancing together and to overcome his nervousness by dancing again.
7	"The Reeling Maiden"; Transliteration: "Taguru Otome" (Japanese: 手繰る乙女)	November 16, 2019
After the events from the campus festival, Takuma checks up on Futaba and the rest of the Saotome sisters. He checks up on them, leading into an awkward conversation with the sisters. Until it was Kururi's turn. She gave Takuma an invention that involved his clothes. He then got injured and the sisters are caring for him. The next day, Misa made food and Itsuyo asked her, how to have a date. However, both of them haven't had enough experience either. In a flashback, Misa remembers when she was chased by a boar and taking care of their family. Afterwards, Itsuyo regrets for what happen at the campus festival. Later, Misa asked Takuma to take care of doing the laundry. After finishing it, Misa grabbed something from the closet and a small box fell on Takuma. She looks at his head to see if he was hurt, but it led to an awkward situation. Yakumo and Kururi wanted to see what was going on with them. While Itsuyo tried to stop them from looking. After finishing up more laundry, Misa gave Natsuki a doll and Takuma a key-chain.
8	"The Strengthening Maiden"; Transliteration: "Tsuyoku suru Otome" (Japanese: 強くする乙女)	November 23, 2019
Futaba has a package arrived from Odin as Misa and Itsuyo look through it. Until Misa found a letter from the oracle about a demon. Futaba then gathers everyone and asks Natsuki to become a valkyrie but couldn't. As Futaba told Kururi about a device that measures their skills. She gave each device to everyone to have. Afterwards, Futaba noticed Yakumo and Mutsumi are lagging behind. Later, Takuma came to one of Mutsumi's photo shoots with Yakumo too. In a flashback, Natsuki told Takuma about Yakumo's power and her sensitive hearing. As they had ice cream together, Takuma failed a ritual because of his classmate that interrupted them. Next, Mutsumi walked to her trailer and another ritual involved her and Takuma doing a photo shoot alone with Yakumo assisting. Until a demon appeared and Mutsumi and Yakumo became a Valkyrie. They fought the demon and was hurt. Takuma then used a book and his power help regained their strength and able to defeat the demon. Meanwhile, a boy soon summons Skuld to fight the Saotome sisters.
9	"The Touching and the Touched Maiden"; Transliteration: "Sawaru Otome to Sawarareru Otome" (Japanese: 触る乙女と触られる乙女)	November 30, 2019
On a train, Natsuki has to perform a ritual (first grope her and second have Takuma protect Itsuyo from a groper.) She surprised her and Takuma is waiting at the next train stop. But they stood on the opposite side of the exit. Takuma then rush to stop Natsuki from touching Itsuyo. Meanwhile, a boy is buying fish from the store as the people around offered him gifts. He went home and Tohru was locked up and haven't eaten anything since. Roskva and Skuld shows up from arriving to Japan. They got to the apartment to find a way to defeat the Saotome sisters and contain Takuma. Later that evening, Takuma and Natsuki walked down the street and heard a voice. She looks further down, but Ichika walks up and surprised her. At home, the sisters greet Ichika back and she gave Takuma a demeaning look. Afterwards, the bath is cleaned by Futaba and everyone took a bath. While Takuma performed a ritual with Ichika and help scrub their backs.
10	"The Drunken Maiden"; Transliteration: "You Otome" (Japanese: 酔う乙女)	December 7, 2019
Tohru, Skuld, and Roskva explored around the city thinking of an idea to defeat the Saotome sisters. Until Ichika fights them, she then punches Tohru and pins Roskva from moving. Meanwhile, a demon possessed a boy and walked near Ichika. It caught her by surprise and for reinforcements, Skuld kissed Roskva to summon more demons. Until Itsuyo stopped the demons from attacking. Skuld then thinks about the situation and retreats. Later, Futaba suggested that everyone get better now that the enemy has a demigoddess. Natsuki talks to Shino and she mentions Takuma, leaving Natsuki embarrassed. Meanwhile, Takuma and Itsuyo finished a ritual and everyone wanted to know if her skills progressed. But it doesn't and tried doing something else too to level up. Afterwards, the sisters talked about what happen, when Skuld appeared. Takuma then walks into a room and Natsuki hugs him. Futaba told Takuma that Natsuki drank one of Kururi's drink mix and is drunk. They went to a different room and Natsuki asked him to undress her. Takuma then wanted a book from Natsuki that was under her head. She noticed the book was about a dating guide.
11	"The Accepting Maiden"; Transliteration: "Mitomeru Otome" (Japanese: 認める乙女)	December 14, 2019
Skuld reappears with demons and Futaba is fighting her. Meanwhile, Ichika escorts Takuma to somewhere. She recalls that she, Futaba, and Misa came up with ideas to defeat Skuld and Roskva, her maid. But Takuma thought of an idea to get to Roskva first, then defeat Skuld. Afterwards, Takuma performed a ritual with Futaba. Skuld brags about defeating her and Ichika sensed that demons are blocking off their path. Futaba defeats the demons around her as Shino then used a barrier to protect people from them. The demons overpowered Futaba as Roskva changed into her demon form to fight Ichika. Takuma then stops her from attacking and retreats to a park. They performed a ritual and evaded from Skuld's attacks. Takuma then awaken a hidden power to fight against Skuld and Roskva.
12	"The Loving Maiden"; Transliteration: "Koi suru Otome" (Japanese: 恋する乙女)	December 21, 2019
Takuma used his powers to restore everyone's strength and they overpowered Skuld and Roskva. Until they transformed into a demon. Takuma defends an attack from the demon as Natsuki and Ichika fought back. Which made Skuld and Roskva transform back into being separated and they retreated. Meanwhile, Tohru wants to tear something up to get to the other sisters. But the boy tells him to leave before Ichika and Futaba appears. He then injured Misa as Takuma later tries to heal her. Takuma finds a way to heal Misa back within her body. She later awakens to everyone and thanks Takuma for saving her. Shino then also thanks him, but he was surprised by her looks since she used her normal clothes and didn't have a helmet on. At school, Takuma has gotten better grades as life returns to normal.
