= List of Magical Girl Site characters =

The Magical Girl Site manga and anime series features a cast of characters designed by Kentarō Satō.

== Magical Girls ==
Magical girls are unfortunate girls who are chosen through Magical Girl Sites. The managers of the sites give them weapons, known as Wands (ステッキ, sutekki; lit. 'Stick'). The usage of these wands shorten their lifespan. Initially, the magical girls were created to fight amongst each other and collect negative energy with their wand, in order to survive the Tempest. The more magical wands they used, the more negative energy is collected. These magical girls appearance physically changes while using their wand, such as their hair color changing, emblems appear on their eyes, lifespan emblem on their skin, and blood flows out of a body part. Which body part bleeds is unique to each girl as they bleed from the same body part each time, no matter which wand they use.

=== Main characters ===
Aya Asagiri (朝霧 彩, Asagiri Aya)
Voiced by: Yuko Ōno
Aya is a fourteen-year-old middle school girl with long black hair. She has had a hard life being bullied at school, and abused at home by her brother wishing multiple times that she were better off dead. However she has a gentle and kind personality which is shown when she takes care of an abandoned cat that is later killed by her bullies. After she receives her wand, she is reluctant in using it as she doesn't want to kill people anymore. When her own life is in danger though, she finds that she has no choice in order to stay alive. Her wand is a toy-like pistol that shoots a large heart, that teleports the target to any location she has been before. However, after Tsuyuno's death, her wand became able to transfer memories and lifespan between the magical girls. Every time she uses her wand, her hair grows longer and turns from black to red while blood flows from her eyes. The emblem on her weapon, and in her eyes when she uses it is a red heart. Her special skill is reading, and her advantage is her warm personality. Aya's favorite things include fruit, chocolate, stuffed toys, and meaty foods. It is recently revealed that she is the adoptive daughter of her parents that she's live with, while Tsuyuno is her twin sister. At the end of the series, Aya and Tsuyuno became a couple despite being siblings.
Tsuyuno Yatsumura (奴村 露乃, Yatsumura Tsuyuno)
Voiced by: Himika Akaneya
Tsuyuno is Aya's classmate, and reveals herself to be another magical girl when she saves her from being injured by her bully. Tsuyuno has also had a traumatic life, after her parents and unborn sibling were killed by a burglar in a home invasion when she was a small child. The burglar spared her life saying that he would be back for her when she got older. She lived in fear until the same website that later appeared for Aya pops up granting her magical powers. She is later able to track down her parents' killer, and takes her revenge by keeping him in her apartment and tortures him each day. After meeting Aya, she offers to help her out, comforting her when she gets scared which in turn forms a strong friendship between the two. After her apartment collapsed because of the battle she and Aya had against Sarina, she lives in Aya's house. She tells Aya though that each time they use their magical wands their lifespan is shortened. Tsuyuno can freeze time with her wand, a smartphone. When she uses her wand, the emblem in her eyes is a yellow crescent moon, her hair which is normally blonde fades into orange while blood flows out of her mouth. In chapter 54, Tsuyuno died and her body is surrounded by black smoke after overusing her wand. She might have been reincarnated as Ni, a site manager. Her favorite things are vegetables, mobile games, honey, yogurt, cute things and mascot characters. It shown that Tsuyuno's family is adopted and that she is actually Aya's twin sister. In the anime, Tsuyuno was somehow resurrected and continued to stay with Aya after defeating Site Administrator Nana. At the end of the series, Tsuyuno and Aya became a couple despite being siblings.
Rina Shioi (潮井 梨ナ, Shioi Rina)
Voiced by: Aina Suzuki
Rina is a thirteen-year-old girl who is currently taking on the appearance of Sarina's older sister due to using a magical wand in the form a camera. Tsuyuno met Rina online while trying to figure out what the countdown clock on the website meant. Rina was initially collecting information about other magical girls when she disappeared at the same time a magical girl killing spree started. It is later revealed that she is in fact the killer, and has been killing fellow magical girls in order to obtain their wands to stay alive. Her own wand is a hammer, her emblem being a blue diamond in her eyes, her pink hair fades into light blue and blood flows out of her nose when she uses it. Before becoming a magical girl, she was bullied at her school and attempted to hang herself to die. Due to said bullying, she harbors a fear of cicadas. Rina informs Tsuyuno and Aya that she had discovered that the countdown clock is ticking down to the end of humanity. The two are able to subdue Rina, but before she is able to tell her source she falls into a coma due to overusing the wands she collected. The doctors who later examined her are perplexed as while she looks youthful, her organs operate like those of a 70 year old. She recovers from her coma thanks to Kosame, and later becomes an ally. Rina's favorite things include pancakes, computers, and avocados.
Nijimi Anazawa (穴沢 虹海, Anazawa Nijimi)
Voiced by: Yū Serizawa
Nicknamed Nijimin, she is the most popular idol of the national idol group 'Inu Asobi' (Puppy Play). Aya and Tsuyuno try to meet her after finding her photo in a Slaughter Note of magical girls Rina was carrying. Though her normal demeanor is very perky and friendly, when she is shown a picture of Rina, she becomes very upset, hot-tempered and homicidal. She wants to avenge the death of her best friend and fellow magical girl, Mikado Ikemata (池股 みかど, Ikemata Mikado) , who was murdered by Rina in order to steal her mechanical pencil wand. After becoming allies with Aya and Tsuyuno, she quits Inu Asobi and transfers to Aya's school. She later feels betrayed when she learned that Aya and Tsuyuno had been keeping Rina's location a secret from her as she doesn't know that they need Rina's help regarding the Tempest. Nijimin can control anyone's mind with her wand, a pair of panties. The emblem on them, and in her eyes when she uses it, is a purple spade. Her physical changes when using her wand are concealed, such as wearing contact lens to hide the emblem in her eyes, dying her hair to conceal her hair color changing, applying concealer on her wrist to cover her lifespan emblem and where she bleeds is a secret. Nijimin falls in love with Aya's older brother, Kaname, thus she trusts him very much; but he ended up stealing her wand that was temporarily taken by Tsuyuno and tells him about the other's wands abilities. However, Kaname instead uses her wand to completely control her mind and ambushed the others. She is later killed by Kaname with Sayuki's wand while trying to get back her wand, but she managed to injure him with the last of her strength. Before becoming a magical girl, Nijimin's family had a financial crisis and lived in fear when loan sharks kept on coming to their house and threatening her father to pay for his debts. Unable to pay for his debts, her father later committed suicide by hanging himself.
Sarina Shizukume (雫芽 さりな, Shizukume Sarina)
Voiced by: Haruka Yamazaki
Sarina is the leader of a trio of bullies (School bullying) who have mercilessly tormented Aya since she transferred to their school as she sees her as a weak girl. When one of her friends in the trio, Erika Kaijima (貝島 えりか, Kaijima Erika) dies because of Aya's wand, she is immediately suspicious of her which leads to a threatening confrontation with a box cutter in the girls bathroom at school. Aya is saved by Tsuyuno who slits Sarina's throat with her own box cutter while time was frozen. Sarina survives the wound and winds up at the same hospital that Rina was taken to. She soon learns that Aya and Tsuyuno were responsible for her injury, and overhears them talking about the existence of magical girls, leading to her grudge against them. Unlike other magical girls, Sarina later receives a wand directly from Nana (a magical girl site administrator) in the form of a yo-yo with the emblem of an orange phi (Φ) that has the ability to slice objects in half. Her red hair fades to yellowish-orange and blood flows out of her ears when she uses her wand. She is then sent to complete Rina's mission of collecting wands. Sarina is allegedly killed by Nana in the third manga volume when she asks if being the only survivor is worth it once the tempest is completed. At the end of the fifth manga volume though, it is revealed that she survived because Alice saved by turning back time with her wand. She partnered with Alice, and later teamed up with Aya and the rest of the magical girls in order to help with the destruction of the Magical Girl Site Administrators. Sarina began developing friendlier and more reliable personalities after Aya saved her from Tsuyuno's apartment collapsing. In the final battle, Sarina sacrificed herself to help Aya and died in her arms, but she and everyone who died was resurrected in the new timeline at the end of the series.

=== Kosame's team ===
Kosame Amagai (雨谷 小雨, Amagai Kosame)
Voiced by: Yumi Hara
Kosame first appears at the end of the third manga volume when she heals Rina's injuries and wakes her from her coma and introduces herself as "a magical girl from another magical girl site". She wears an eyepatch over her left eye and often carries with her a puppy plushie. Her wand is a box cutter which she can use to heal her friends by cutting herself, and letting her blood flow into their mouth or open wounds. Kosame suffers from terminal cancer and the doctor told her that she only had six more months left to live. Heavily depressed by the statement, she began practicing self-harming by cutting her wrist. Her emblem is the letter Q located on the right side of her neck. Kosame's hair fades from silver to pale pink when she uses her wand. She is nicknamed 'Mental Girl' by Rina because of her sudden insane personality that makes her obsessively want to cut herself, and needs to take medication to suppress it.
Kiyoharu Suirenji (水蓮寺 清春, Suirenji Kiyoharu)
Voiced by: Eriko Matsui
A transgender girl who attends the same school as Kosame. Kiyoharu is recognized as female by the magical girl site, thus she is chosen as a magical girl. She was bullied at her school by the people who learned of her assigned gender. She has expressed her utter distaste for her peers to Kosame in private, and plans to exact vengeance on her bullies only after they had found happiness, just so she could feel the satisfaction of "throwing them from paradise into hell." Her wand takes the form of a ring with the power to link directly within her target's sensory system to control their body and experience their senses remotely. Her emblem is the letter S. Blood flows out of her forehead and her blonde hair fades into pink purple when using her wand.
Asahi Takiguchi (滝口 あさひ, Takiguchi Asahi)
Voiced by: Lynn
Asahi is a seemingly popular and athletic girl that goes to a different school than Kosame's group, but received her wand from the same site. She is often seen in the city with many males surrounding her. Her wand is a necklace that grants her super human speed and strength. Her emblem is the letter H. While using her wand, her orange hair fades into magenta colour. Asahi's unfortunate background that caused her to be chosen as a magical girl is caused by the fact that she was a victim of domestic violence on the part of her father, who beat her, along with her mother and her little siblings, later, the girl killed him, and she was able to resume a normal life together with her mother and siblings.
Mikari Izumigamine (泉ヶ峰 みかり, Izumigamine Mikari)
Voiced by: Kaede Hondo
Mikari is an heiress from a seemingly rich family whose parents were murdered by a psychopath on a street. She is somewhat haughty and frequently abuses her butler Yukiji out of entertainment, usually with her wand, a broomstick that enables flight. Her emblem is the letter V. Mikari's hair which is usually lavender fades into pale green while using her wand. She is later killed by a site administrator. In the past, her parents were brutally murdered in public by a crazed killer. At the end of the series, She is resurrected in the new timeline and is living a happy life with her parents after they were saved by Aya.
Sayuki Ringa (燐賀 紗雪, Ringa Sayuki)
Voiced by: M.A.O
Sayuki is the only daughter of a yakuza, possessing great sword fighting and martial arts skills. Her wand is a katana that can slice and harden anything from long distance, while her emblem is the letter X. Sayuki's black hair fades into purple and blood flows out of her left thumbnail while using her wand. It is later revealed that she was chosen as the magical girl while as a little girl she was kidnapped by members of a rival yakuza family before murdering her kidnappers with the wand she received. Her mother is currently imprisoned for taking the blame for her daughter's actions. She is later killed by the site administrator go, who she managed to kill with the last of her strength.

=== Antagonistic magical girls ===
Alice Maganuma (禍沼 アリス, Maganuma Arisu)
Alice first appeared in the manga seventh volume and is a magical girl who was chosen by Ni, saving Sarina from being shot by Nana and becomes her partner. Alice has shark-like teeth and spiraled iris in her eyes. She is very knowledgeable about the magical girls, as she keeps complete data of all magical girls in her laptop and is quick in searching the information about the unfortunate girls who have the potential to be chosen as magical girls. She is the one who planned the mission to capture or assassinate the Magical Girl Site's managers. She likes recording the tragic events that happen to magical girls with her smartphone, before rewinding time and saving them, using the videos as proof. Her wand is a flip phone with the ability to reverse time while her emblem is the Roman numeral IV, and her hair fades from lime green to purple when she uses it. Alice's mother committed suicide after giving birth to her while her father's whereabouts is unknown. She was sent to a foster home and was bullied there, before running away. It is later revealed that she is the adoptive younger sister of the Detective Misumi. It is revealed later on that she became a magical girl to avenge her little sister who died after using all her lifespan to kill criminals.

== Site Managers ==
Magical Girl Site has characters present in the story that are referred to as "site managers". They appeared in monochrome-coloured and have a mask-like face. Initially they give the girls their magical wands in order for them to kill each other in order to bring on the "tempest" that will end humanity. When the girls find out their plans though, they rebel against them causing the site managers to turn on the magical girls. The actions of the site managers are instructed by an omnipotent being they referred to as The King. While there are approximately eighteen site managers, only three have details known about them. It is hinted that the site managers might be the fallen magical girls that used up their lifespans.

Nana (漆, Nana; lit. 'Seven')
Voiced by: Ryusei Nakao
Nana is the first site manager that makes an appearance, who gives Aya her magical wand. They appear as a young girl wearing a Catholic school jumper with a short-sleeved collared shirt underneath, and has pigtails. Their face appears unnatural, and speaks primarily in riddled rhymes. The wands they provides have small angel-esque wings. The magical girls who were chosen by them have their emblems vary from simple shapes to Greek letters, located on their left wrist. Nana's powers are shooting bullets and laser beams that twists her target's body (similar to Hyoka's wand), from her index finger while she is making the 'gun shape' with her hands. Like Ni, they were also recently revealed to be a fallen magical girl named Hyoka Nagatsuki (長月 雹花, Nagatsuki Hyōka), the protagonist of "Mahou Shoujo Site Sept".
Hachi (捌, Hachi; lit. 'Eight')
Voiced by: Kizuna AI
Hachi is a website manager who chooses Kosame and her teammates as magical girls. They have fat body, face that resembles a Noh mask and wears kimono. They wields a katana as a weapon and able to create clones of themselves with their illusion power. The wands they provide have bat-like wings and their emblems are the Roman alphabet, located on the right side of the magical girl's neck.
Ni (弐, Ni; lit. 'Two')
Voiced by: Aoi Yūki
Ni is a site manager who chose Alice as the magical girl and has a face that resembles a Hyotokko mask, gauze wrapped under their chin and wears a gakuran. The wands they provide have small skeletal wings and their emblems are Roman numerals located on the magical girl's left collarbone. After being successfully defeated in an ambush, they were revealed to be a fallen magical girl named Shizuka Ochi (越智 沈果, Ochi Shizuka). Ni seems to have been reborn in chapter 83 of the manga and able to freezes time (like Tsuyuno) by clapping their hands.
Ichi (壱, Ichi; lit. 'One')
Voiced by: Yuya Asato
Ichi appears as the leader of the managers when he is shown to talk seriously during their discuss. Their appearance is based on Slender Man or Noppera-bō and wear a military uniform.
Juuroku (拾陸, Juuroku; lit. 'Sixteen')
Initially appearing as a blank silhouette, Juuroku is a chubby website manager whose appearance is based on Kintaro doll and chose the characters of Magical Girl Site Sept as magical girls. They carries a giant axe as their weapon. The wands they provides have mechanical metal wings and the magical girls chosen by them have zodiac signs located on the back of their left hand as their emblems.
A
A person that posed website manager who provided magical managers to Touko and the murderers of Kayo's younger sister. It's later revealed that she chose magical girls whom she met face-to-face, instead of through magical girl sites, while the wands she provided are stolen from the basement of Detective Misumi's house. In an attempt to kill Detective Misumi, she is shot to death by him instead. She is revealed to be the magical girl named Isoko Anjo (安條 磯子, Anjo Isoko), one of the main characters from Mahou Shoujo Site Sept.

=== Other Site Managers ===
San (参, San; lit. 'Three')
Shi (肆, Shi; lit. 'Four')
Go (伍, Go; lit. 'Five')
Roku (陸, Roku; lit. 'Six')
Voiced by: Jurouta Kosugi
Roku is a site manager who has a face that resembles an Hannya mask, hair tied into two braids and wears a sweatshirt. Their power is releasing black smokes from their hands that can disintegrate objects.
Kyu (玖, Kyu; lit. 'nine')
Juu (拾, Juu; lit. 'Ten')
Voiced by: Katsuyuki Konishi
Juuichi (拾壱, Juuichi; lit. 'eleven')
Juuni (拾弐, Juuni; lit. 'twelve')
Juusan (拾参, Juusan; lit. 'thirteen')
Juushi (拾肆, Juushi; lit. 'Fourteen')
Juugo (拾伍, Juugo; lit. 'Fifteen')
Voiced by: Fuji Aoi
Juushichi (拾漆, Juushichi; lit. 'Seventeen')
Juuhachi (拾捌, Juuhachi; lit. 'Eighteen')

== Other characters ==
Kaname Asagiri (朝霧 要, Asagiri Kaname)
voiced by: Nobuhiko Okamoto
Aya's adoptive older brother that abuses her every chance he gets when he's alone, usually by tying her up and punching her until she vomits. He actually assumes everyone around him as "disgusting", though he appears as a charismatic boy outside. It is revealed that he abuses Aya as a stress outlet to deal with his father's high expectations of his son's academic performance, hitting him when he doesn't get perfect marks on tests and other assignments. Kaname believes himself as a prodigy who is able to manipulate anyone he wants and desires to become a God. He later becomes involved with magical girls when he discovers the Magical Girl Site on Aya's browser history and starts working together with Nana. After stealing Nijimi's wand and completely controlling her mind, he attacks Aya and the others while they are on a beach vacation. After the ambush and before he could finish them, he is abducted, tied up and raped in Detective Misumi's basement.
Kiichiro Misumi (美炭 貴一郎, Misumi Kiichiro)
voiced by: Tatsuhisa Suzuki
A police detective who's responsible for investigating every cases that are caused by the magical girls. It's later revealed that he cooperates with the site managers and keeps a lot of magical wands in the basement of his house. He is the adoptive older brother of Alice. It is later revealed that he had another biological sister named Louise who was a magical girl. He found out about the site after it popped up on Alice's computer shortly after Louise's disappearance and vowed to destroy the magical girl site system himself.
The King of Ancient Humanity (先人類の王, Senjinrui no ō)
voiced by: Mamiko Noto
Simply known as 'The King', she plays the major antagonistic role in the series. She is said to be an omnipotent figure from the past and is responsible for causing the Tempest. In order for a magical girl to be a sole survivor of the Tempest, they have to feed The King with the negative energy they collected with their wand. In chapter 83, she is shown to be the boss of all the site managers.

=== School official ===
Makoto Hinomoto (火本 真, Hinomoto Makoto)
He is a classmate who gives Aya a secret thought, and is the only existence that has supported Aya's heart before Tsuyuno. A kindhearted and pure character who always cares about Aya, but has strong guilt about not being able to help her from bullying. So he despises Sarina and her friend group who tease Aya and does not feel comfortable with their existence. Since Aya herself is attracted to Makoto who cares for himself, it can be said both secretly like each other. Makoto is cameo appearing for a moment without a line in the 1st episode of the anime.
Erika Kaijima (貝島 えりか, Kaijima Erika)
voiced by: Eri Kitamura
Sarina's best friend and one of the girls who are members of a group who are bullying Aya. Erika, who was particularly close to Sarina, was more aggressive in bullying than Sarina in a sense, such as killing the kitten that Aya had loved and forcing her acquaintance's senior Shota Arai (荒井 翔太, Arai Shota) to rape Aya, but in a sense more than Sarina the momentary movement of the stick that Aya used for the first time, she is killed by a train with Shota. However, since Shota was originally disliked by most students other than Sarina and her friend group, and Sarina's group was secretly disliked by the surrounding people, some students were delighted that Erika and Shota were killed by a train accident.
Ai Kawano (川野 愛, Kawano Ai)
voiced by: Ayaka Shimizu
Sarina's best friend and one of the girls who are members of a group who was bullying Aya. Ai is very active in bullying Aya, but she has a certain level of scrutiny compared to Sarina and Erika and tried to stop it if it was overkill when Sarina asked for a box cutter.

== Magical Girls of Second Site ==
Another series of events that occur before the events of Aya and the others, unofficially dubbed as "Second Site".

Kayo Komura (湖村 花夜, Komura Kayo)
Kayo is a bullied girl, first appearing in the manga ninth volume. Her father murdered three boys that were suspected to have killed her younger sister, Airi Komura. She is bullied by her classmate, Melissa Maina Mitsushiro (蜜白 メリッサ 麻衣奈, Mitsushiro Melissa Maina), who always mentioned "the blood of a murderer flows through her veins". Her wand is a compact that allows copying of other magical girls' wands by simply touching them, which can copy up to 10 wands and is limited to one time using only per copy. Her emblem is a sun. When using her wand, blood flows out of her mouth while her hair grows longer and fades from purple to orange. She was chosen as a magical girl and received her wand from Nana. Kayo owned the Slaughter Note before it was passed to Rina by Nana. After Touko's death, she and Sakura are said to have committed suicide. However, it is later revealed that they faked their death by creating clones of themselves with a wand, before throwing them off the school roof. They hide themselves together with Aya in an abandoned building and were collecting information about destroying the magical girl site system.
Sakura Sakaki (酒木 さくら, Sakaki Sakura)
Sakura is a short, cartoonish looking girl who is a classmate of Kayo. Her wand is a game controller that creates shockwaves while her emblem is an uppercase sigma (Σ). While using her wand, blood flows out of her navel, in which she bandaged. She is an otaku and bookworm, and aspires to become a manga artist. She is also a big fan of Puppy Play and Nijimin. Sakura tells Kayo that Airi might have been murdered with a magical girl's wand due to the state of the body. Her father died three years ago due to drowning, which was deemed an accident.
Touko Arareya (霰矢 冬子, Arareya Touko)
Touko is an initially violent girl with a forked tongue and a wand shaped like a conductor's baton that creates explosions while her emblem is an infinity (∞). When she uses her wand, blood flows out of her eyes. She has murdered several magical girls before encountering Kayo in search of a wand that can heal her little brother after he survived a house fire that killed their parents. After their fight, her more playful side shows and becomes allies with Kayo and Sakura. In order to aid them, Touko disguised as A and met Detective Misumi. However, Misumi states that A has died and she is later shot by Nana. Unlike the others, Touko received her wand from A.

== Magical Girl Site Sept characters ==
These characters appear in the spin-off, Magical Girl Site Sept. This story seems to take place before the main storyline.

=== Main characters ===
Tsurara Takahashi (高橋 つらら, Takahashi Tsurara)
Tsurara is the main protagonist and was chosen as a magical girl by Juuroku. She experienced painful life at school; being raped, and later gets impregnated by her tennis coach, Kuraki. After receiving her wand, she used it to kill Kuraki who is attempting to rape her. She later dated and had sex with her crush Akai, which caused her to pretend the child in her tummy is Akai's child instead of Kuraki's child. After a collection of naked pictures of her was spread to the whole school by Ms. Maguchi, she is very embarrassed by it, and Akai broke up with her and she later committed suicide by jumping off the school roof at the suggestion of Akai and her classmates, her unborn child died with her. Her wand is a drill with the ability to shoots laser beams that twists the body of her target while her emblem is the sign of Libra, located on the back of her left hand. While using her wand, her light brown hair grows longer and fades into yellow colour while blood flows out of her vagina.
Hyoka Nagatsuki (長月 雹花, Nagatsuki Hyoka)
Voiced by: Ayako Kawasumi
Hyoka is the best friend of Tsurara who is very concerned of Tsurara's condition. She became a magical girl after using Tsurara's wand to destroy the dead body of Kuraki. Like Tsurara, when she uses the wand, her hair grows longer and fades into yellow colour, while blood flows out of her vagina. She wants to raise money Tsurara's child, thus she uses Tsurara's wand to commit a string of robberies and muggings. She is the previous identity of Nana, a magical girl site manager. It seems that Tsurara's drill wand is passed to Hyouka after her death, judging from Nana's power that's similar as that wand, so that wand caused her lifespan to run out and its ability to carry over in site manager form. Hyoka also appears in the 12th episode of the anime as a giant eyeball.
Isoko Anjo (安條 磯子, Anjo Isoko)
Isoko is a cynical magical girl and also a deliverer of magical wands under the name 'A'. She has a habit of breaking a tight situation by making stupid jokes. Despite appearing as a quiet girl and being isolated in her class, she is very knowledgeable of everything happening around her. She later helps Hyouka by showing her who the real culprit that spread Tsurara's nude photos was. In Sept, her wand is a handbell that produces great sound wave and her emblem is a proportional symbol, while her wand in the main story is a hair dryer that can return the original state of objects and her emblem is the angstrom sign Å.

=== Antagonistic magical girls ===
Reiko Maguchi (間口 冷子, Maguchi Reiko)
Reiko is a teacher at Tsurara's school and is responsible for causing Tsurara to commit suicide. She is sickly in love with Kuraki and is very jealous seeing him together with Tsurara, thus she spread the nude photos of Tsurara to the whole school as the sign of her deep hatred. She also had frozen Kuraki's sperm to bear a child with him. Reiko became a magical girl when she found a magical wand inside a student's locker and used it, which is a bracelet with the ability to produce icicles. Her emblem is the sign of Scorpio. She was later killed by Hyoka and Isoko before Hyoka's lifespan ran out.
