= Dragon Pilot: Hisone and Masotan =

Japanese anime television series and its adaptation(s)

- Main visual

ひそねとまそたん (Hisone to Masotan)
- Genre: Aerial warfare
- Created by: Bones; Shinji Higuchi; Mari Okada
- Manga
- Written by: Bones; Shinji Higuchi; Mari Okada; Akiko Waba (story cooperation)
- Illustrated by: Toshinao Aoki
- Published by: Kadokawa (Fujimi Shobo)
- Magazine: Monthly Dragon Age
- Original run: March 9, 2018 – July 9, 2018
- Anime television series
- Directed by: Shinji Higuchi (chief); Hiroshi Kobayashi
- Produced by: Masahiko Minami
- Written by: Mari Okada
- Music by: Taisei Iwasaki
- Studio: Bones
- Licensed by: Netflix
- Original network: Tokyo MX
- Original run: April 13, 2018 – June 29, 2018
- Episodes: 12
- icon

Dragon Pilot: Hisone and Masotan (Japanese: ひそねとまそたん, Hepburn: Hisone to Masotan) is a Japanese anime television series created by director Shinji Higuchi, screenwriter Mari Okada, and animation studio Bones. Toshinao Aoki is responsible for the original character designs, Yoshiyuki Itō served as the animation character designer, and Taisei Iwasaki composed the music. The anime project was revealed by the staff at the 2017 Tokyo Comic Con in December 2017. It began airing on April 13, 2018. It was licensed by Netflix for domestic and international streaming, and released internationally on September 21, 2018.

== Plot ==
Hisone Amakasu is a rookie in the Japan Air Self-Defense Force, where she is situated at the Gifu air base. She decided to join the force to distance herself from people as, her whole life, she had found it difficult to interact with others due to her candid style of speaking and oftentimes hurtful words, despite that not being her intention. Hisone's decision leads to her life being changed when the concealed "OTF" – Organic Transformed Flyer, or dragon – inside the base chooses her to be his pilot, leading her to discover her destined role as a dragon pilot during their ascension in the skies together. According to legend, dragons are thought to possess a key to unlocking the future of the world.

== Characters ==
=== Pilots ===
Hisone Amakasu (甘粕ひそね, Amakasu Hisone)
Voiced by: Misaki Kuno (Japanese); Christine Marie Cabanos (English)
JASDF Airman Third Class (later Technical Sergeant). A rookie at JASDF Gifu Air Base who is chosen by Masotan to be his Dragon Pilot (D-Pilot). She has a habit of constantly speaking her mind without restriction, which makes her seem rude at times, even when she means well. She has a habit of belittling herself in front of others, since she was never close to anyone before and tries to accept things, rather than fight to change them. Her TAC name is "Hisone".
Nao Kaizaki (貝崎名緒, Kaizaki Nao)
Voiced by: Tomoyo Kurosawa (Japanese); Sarah Anne Williams (English)
JASDF Airman Third Class. A cadet at Gifu Air Base who was initially the only person in line to become a D-Pilot; however, Masotan refused to eat her or any other potential pilot for years. She has a strong fighting instinct and often tries provoke fights with those around her. She greatly resents Hisone and often tries to bully her, though Hisone tends to misinterpret her bullying as friendly gestures. Her mother was a D-Pilot. She later becomes a spare D-Pilot, after a specific suit is developed that entices the dragon into eating the wearer, but the effects are limited. Her TAC name is "Sexy Jaguar".
Elle Hoshino (星野絵瑠, Hoshino Eru)
Voiced by: Maki Kawase (Japanese); Katelyn Gault (English)
JASDF Senior Master Sergeant. A D-Pilot from Tsuiki Air Base in Fukuoka. Ever since she was young, she had wanted to be the first female fighter pilot; however, a dragon chose her as a D-Pilot, preventing her from becoming an "actual pilot", causing her much anger and self-hatred. Initially, she refuses to see her dragon as anything but a tool and object, to the point where she forces it to remain in its fighter plane form at all times. She is cool and dignified, and is very good at both academics and sports. Her TAC name is "Penguin".
Lilico Kinutsugai (絹番莉々子, Kinutsugai Ririko)
Voiced by: Satomi Arai (Japanese); Erika Harlacher (English)
JASDF Technical Sergeant. A soft and subdued D-Pilot from Misawa Air Base in Aomori with severe shut-in tendencies. While she tends to always imagine the worst-case scenario for all situations and has many negative thoughts, she is also very competent and clever. Her TAC name is "Jimmy".
Mayumi Hitomi (日登美真弓, Hitomi Mayumi)
Voiced by: Kaori Nazuka (Japanese); Xanthe Huynh (English)
JASDF Technical Sergeant. A tall, mother-like D-Pilot from Iruma Air Base in Saitama Prefecture. She understands and cares deeply about the feelings of dragons. Her TAC name is "Morris".

=== Other characters ===
Sada Hinomoto (樋本貞, Hinomoto Sada)
Voiced by: Romi Park (Japanese); Cindy Robinson (English)
An elderly woman who frequently sells yogurt around the base. She is the last living D-Pilot from the previous Ritual and flew Masotan under the name of "Montparnasse", but quit the OTF squad after her beloved childhood friend and girlfriend Yae, the leading miko of the last Ritual, became Mitatsu's appeasement sacrifice.
Haruto Okonogi (小此木榛人, Okonogi Haruto)
Voiced by: Yuki Kaji (Japanese); Bryce Papenbrook (English)
JASDF Airman First Class. A young member of Masotan's maintenance team, and Hisone's love interest. He is actually part of the Okonogi family, which is partially responsible for carrying out the Ritual every 74 years.
Yutaka Zaito (財投豊, Zaitō Yutaka)
Voiced by: Yukitoshi Tokumoto (Japanese); Ben Pronsky (English)
JASDF Captain. A somewhat perverted fighter pilot who has his sights set on Elle. However, underneath his exterior, he is competitive and good-natured.
Remi Kakiyasu (柿保令美, Kakiyasu Remi)
Voiced by: Rie Kugimiya (Japanese); Carrie Keranen (English)
JASDF Lieutenant Colonel. Hisone's superior officer. She was once a D-Pilot candidate but was not accepted by Masotan, who instead chose her friend and colleague Moriyama, otherwise known as "Forest." In addition, the man she loved also fell for Moriyama and they got married. Since then, she has remained in the JASDF to train future D-Pilots.
Iboshi (飯干, Īboshi)
Voiced by: Yoshimitsu Shimoyama (Japanese)
The government supervisor of the OTF squad. A slick, callous individual who is only interested in results and gives no consideration to the human factors within the project. His only weakness is his passion for sweets.
Hiroki Ikushima (幾嶋博己, Ikushima Hiroki)
Voiced by: Junichi Suwabe (Japanese); Ray Chase (English) (Japanese)
A strange man, suave man in charge of designing the D-Pilot suits. Nao has a crush on him, although it appears he does not have an interest in anything apart from designing suits.
Hiroshi Sosoda (曽々田弘, Sosoda Hiroshi)
Voiced by: Jōji Nakata (Japanese); Doug Stone (English)
JASDF Major General. The commander of Gifu base's Air Development and Test Wing and a major general. In spite of his tough-looking appearance, he is quite easygoing and loves animals, including dragons.
Natsume Misumi (三角棗, Misumi Natsume)
Voiced by: Riko Fukumoto (Japanese); Erica Mendez (English)
The leading miko for the series' Ritual, she is an old childhood friend of Haruto. She is romantically interested in him and therefore quite resentful toward Hisone.

=== Organic Transformed Flyers ===
The dragons used as OTFs by the JASDF are habitually dressed in transforming armor shaped like military planes to avoid drawing public attention. In order to be flown, the dragons swallow their pilots, who then steer them from within their stomachs via a naturally activated holographic display control system. To protect themselves from the dragons' digestive juices, each pilot is required to wear a special acid-resistant suit. In addition, a D-Pilot must reserve her feelings exclusively for her personal OTF; if she establishes a love relationship with someone else, the bond between them is broken (this event is commonly referred to as "anastomosis").

Masotan (まそたん, Masotan) / F-15J
Voiced by: Matsunojō Kanda (Japanese)
The dragon that lives in the JASDF Gifu Base and who accepts Hisone as his pilot. Hisone initially calls him "Otofu," a play on the pronunciation of "OTF," until she discovers a plaque inside him with the characters for "Masotan" written on it. His previous pilot called him "Oscar." He has huge wings and a long tail, and is both honest and serious, but has a fear of strangers. He loves to eat minor metals, commonly used in flip phones, a favorite food of his.
Norma (ノーマ, Nōma) / F-2A
Elle's dragon. Initially, she refuses to give it a name beyond the technical description of its aircraft appearance. Later, she decides to name it "Norma," derived from the Japanese pronunciation of "F-2" 普通 fuutsuu which means "normal" in English. It has a sharp body and long tail, and appears frighteningly vicious at times.
Futomomo (フトモモ, Futomomo) / C-1
Mayumi's dragon and the largest of the four, he takes on the form of a large cargo transportation aircraft. He is easygoing and loves to eat. His name means "thighs" in Japanese.
Akemi (あけみ, Akemi) / E-2C
Lilico's dragon, which takes the form of a large propeller plane. It has a fear of others' eyes and thus always hides one eye with its disk-shaped head.
Mitatsu-sama (ミタツ様, Mitatsu-sama)
A gigantic, flying fish-like monster – classified as a "Giant Organic Transformed Flyer" – large enough to be mistaken for a small island or mountain when at rest. Mitatsu awakens once every 74 years to change its resting place, and the group of OTFs perform their duty to guide him to his next destination without leaving calamity in his wake. Additionally, a ritual performed by a group of miko is needed to safely put him to sleep.

== Media ==
=== Anime ===
The opening theme song titled "Shōjo wa Ano Sora o Wataru" (少女はあの空を渡る; lit. 'The Girl Crosses That Sky') is composed by Taisei Iwasaki and performed by Riko Fukumoto, featuring lyrics written by Mari Okada. The ending theme song titled "Le temps de la rentrée: Koi no Ieji (Shingakki)" (Le temps de la rentrée～恋の家路(新学期)～; lit. 'The Time of the Return: Love's Road Home (New School Term)') is a cover of France Gall's "Le temps de la rentrée," arranged by Iwasaki and performed by D-Pai (D-Pilots, short for "dragon pilots"), a vocal unit comprising voice actresses Misaki Kuno, Tomoyo Kurosawa, Maki Kawase, Satomi Arai and Kaori Nazuka.

No.	English title (Note: All English episode titles are taken from the anime's official website.) Original Japanese title	Directed by	Written by	Original air date
1	"It Is Insane"; Transliteration: "Shōki no satade wa nain desu" (Japanese: 正気の沙汰ではないんです)	Shōhei Miyake	Mari Okada	April 13, 2018
In high school, student Hisone Amakasu ponders her future, having no real ambition in life. Seeing two Mitsubishi F-15Js flying above her school, she half-heartedly lists her career choice as joining the Japan Air Self-Defense Force. Years later, Amakasu – now a more extroverted woman who tends to always speak her mind – works a desk job at Gifu Air Field. One day, she is told by coworker Akishima to deliver some papers to Flight Leader Kakiyasu, who is in the remote Hangar 8. Unbeknownst to her, this is the result of an aptitude test she had taken previously. Amakasu rides to the hangar, getting directions from an elderly woman (who also gives a yogurt) along the way. Upon arriving at the hangar, she finds it deserted safe for a large pool. Without warning, however, a dragon suddenly emerges from the pool and devours Amakasu. She is eventually thrown up and meets Kakiyasu, who along with fellow officer Commander Sosoda, explains that the dragon is an Organic Transformed Flyer (OTF), a kind of dragon that has been shapeshifted by different militaries into various flying objects for disguise purposes to use in combat; the JASDF now uses OTFs while disguising them as fighter planes, with the OTF in question turning into an F-15J. In devouring Amakasu, the OTF has effectively "chosen" her to be his next pilot, or D-Pi, much to Amakasu's dismay. After recovering, Amakasu is taken back to the hangar to meet with the OTF again, and meets his primary handler, Okonogi. Okonogi explains to Amakasu that the OTF in question has not properly chosen a pilot in three years. When the OTF is brought up to meet Amakasu, however, he proceeds to gently nudge her before swallowing her again, proving that he chose Amakasu. The overwhelmed Amakasu soon finds herself in new living quarters, where she meets the OTF's understudy pilot, Nao Kaizaki, who resents Amakasu for usurping her position. After some brief training, Amakasu is again asked to be swallowed by the OTF to do basic training, but she panics and eventually snaps, declaring she can't do it and angrily ranting about Kakiyasu's and Nao's behavior. After talking briefly with Okonogi, Amakasu packs up her stuff to leave, but passes by the hangar and hears Okonogi tending to the OTF while saying that he thinks Amakasu and the OTF are alike. Drawn by this, Amakasu approaches the OTF when Okonogi leaves, and briefly connects with him, only for the OTF to eat her again and then proceed to take flight. In addition to the dragon flying without his disguise on and any proper direction, his stomach fluids start to take a life-threatening toll on Amakasu's body. Just as she is about to give up, she discovers she has a signal on her flip phone due to her helmet and calls to base. Kakiyasu manages to give her instructions to allow her to "safely" get back on the ground. There, Okonogi explains to her that the OTF's diet consists of rare metals, and flip phones are his favorite treat, hence why he tends to eat Amakasu, but she believes it is not the only reason. Feeling a kinship with the OTF, Amakasu decides to remain a D-Pi, and encounters the old lady (who gives her another yogurt) again.
2	"I Name the Dragon Masotan"; Transliteration: "Doragon no namae wa Masotan ni shimasu" (Japanese: ドラゴンの名前はまそたんにします)	Geisei Morita	Mari Okada	April 20, 2018
Hisone successfully flies the dragon and initially gives him the nickname "Otofu." Later, she makes a discovery and begins to call him "Masotan." Flight suit developer Hiroki Ikushima arrives on the base and asks her to review prototype pilot suits. Meanwhile, Hisone's coworker Nao Kaizaki grows tired of her antics.
3	"Take Responsibility, Would You?"; Transliteration: "Sekinin totte kudasai yo" (Japanese: 責任とってくださいよ)	Hideyuki Satake	Keigo Koyanagi	April 27, 2018
The Gifu Air Base is preparing for an annual aviation festival, although many are concerned with Hisone's lack of flying experience. Now promoted to technical sergeant, Hisone learns the story of the dragon's former pilot.
4	"Those Guys Have Come Over to Gifu"; Transliteration: "Yatsura ga Gifu ni yattekita" (Japanese: ヤツらが岐阜にやって来た)	Takahiro Hasui	Akiko Waba; Mari Okada	May 4, 2018
Three other dragon pilots arrive at Gifu base for a joint training exercise. As Hisone gets to know them better, she realizes that all the pilots have very different personalities from each other.
5	"Who Likes to Be Disliked?"; Transliteration: "Suki kononde kirawa retai hito nante imasu ka?" (Japanese: スキ好んで嫌われたい人なんていますか？)	Hiroki Hirano	Akiko Waba; Keigo Koyanagi; Mari Okada	May 11, 2018
The dragon pilots are sent to an uninhabited island to engage in a training in which they must work together to survive with limited supplies in a difficult environment and attempt to return to base. There, Hisone stumbles upon a mysterious structure, while pilot Elle Hoshino's insistence that she is a fighter pilot, not a dragon caretaker, upsets the others.
6	"I Will Call Your Name"; Transliteration: "Kimi no namae o sakebu kara" (Japanese: 君の名前を叫ぶから)	Shōhei Miyake	Akiko Waba; Keigo Koyanagi; Mari Okada	May 18, 2018
Hisone, Lilico, and Mayumi attempt to survive a week on the island with their dragons, while Elle is determined to leave as soon as possible. Elle finally comes to terms with her situation, and the pilots successfully fly back to base.
7	"Kingdom of Love"; Transliteration: "Koisuru ōkoku" (Japanese: 恋する王国)	Hideyuki Satake	Mari Okada	May 25, 2018
The pilots start to build relationships with one another. Vice Minister Iiboshi arrives at the base and informs them that their training was in preparation for an important project known as the "Ritual." Afraid that romantic relationships may distract them, Iiboshi aims to assess each pilot's relationship potential. Hisone and maintenance worker Haruto Okonogi go see a movie together.
8	"Limited Time Offer! Spicy Granny Flavour"; Transliteration: "Kikan gentei! Gekikara obāsan aji" (Japanese: 期間限定！激辛おばあさん味)	Geisei Morita	Keigo Koyanagi	June 1, 2018
Iiboshi reveals the true nature behind the dragon pilot program and the Ritual. Meanwhile, an elderly former pilot reveals her true identity and speaks to the pilots and flight crew. Miko, or shrine maidens, arrive at the base.
9	"Eeeeeeeeeek!"; Transliteration: "Gyaaaa!!" (Japanese: ギャーーー！！)	Takahiro Hasui	Akiko Waba	June 8, 2018
As the date approaches, the pilots perform a simulation Ritual to test their endurance. Haruto's family history is revealed, and Natsume, one of the miko, questions Hisone's relationship with Haruto. Iiboshi and the elderly ex-pilot Sada Hinomoto begin to worry about what they call "anastomosis".
10	"Melty Love"; Transliteration: "Suki ni nattara toro ke chau" (Japanese: 好きになったらトロけちゃう)	Hiroki Hirano	Mari Okada	June 15, 2018
A ceremony is conducted to determine which maiden will lead the Ritual. Anastomosis is preventing Hisone and Elle from piloting their dragons, and Nao notices Hisone's struggles. Fighter pilot Zaito, who has romantic feelings for Elle, is asked to make a difficult decision for the sake of her career.
11	"Montparnasse Sky and Scum Girl"; Transliteration: "Monparunasu no sora to kuzu onna" (Japanese: モンパルナスの空とクズ女)	Noriyuki Nomata	Mari Okada	June 22, 2018
Hisone reverses her decision to quit the JASDF and reunites with Masotan and her fellow pilots to complete the Ritual. However, as it nears its climax, Hinomoto reveals that the rite alone is not sufficient to becalm Mitatsu, entailing an even heavier price.
12	"Invincible Us"; Transliteration: "Muteki no watashi-tachi" (Japanese: 無敵の私たち)	Shōhei Miyake; Hiroki Hirano; Hideyuki Satake; Takahiro Hasui	Mari Okada	June 29, 2018
Unwilling to permit a human sacrifice, Hisone disrupts the Ritual; but will she be able to prevent the loss of one human life, save Japan from destruction, and conciliate her feelings for both Masotan and Haruto all at the same time?

=== Manga ===
A manga adaptation by original character designer Toshinao Aoki began serialization on March 9, 2018, in the April 2018 issue of the Monthly Dragon Age magazine published by Fujimi Shobo and ran for five chapters.

== Reception ==
Dragon Pilot: Hisone and Masotan received the Excellence Award in the animation category at the 22nd Japan Media Arts Festival.

== JASDF Gifu AFB 'Masotan' F-15J's ==
Thanks to the series popularity, the Air Development and Test Wing of the JASDF, based at Gifu AFB have painted four of their F-15J's noses with open 'eye-doors', and a representation of Masotan's eyes looking out when the dragon is in Fighter Mode. This is seen on Gifu's website main page.

The four aircraft were first displayed at the 2018 Gifu AFB Airshow.

- Serial 02-8999, Nose number 999
- Serial 12-8078, Nose number 078
- Serial 32-8942, Nose number 942
- Serial 52-8853, Nose number 853

The aircraft have also been modelled by enthusiasts in the flight simulator DCS World, as freely downloadable user texture map additions. They are designed to be used with the F-15C fighter aircraft, which is a component of the larger Flaming Cliffs 3 & 4 compendium module.

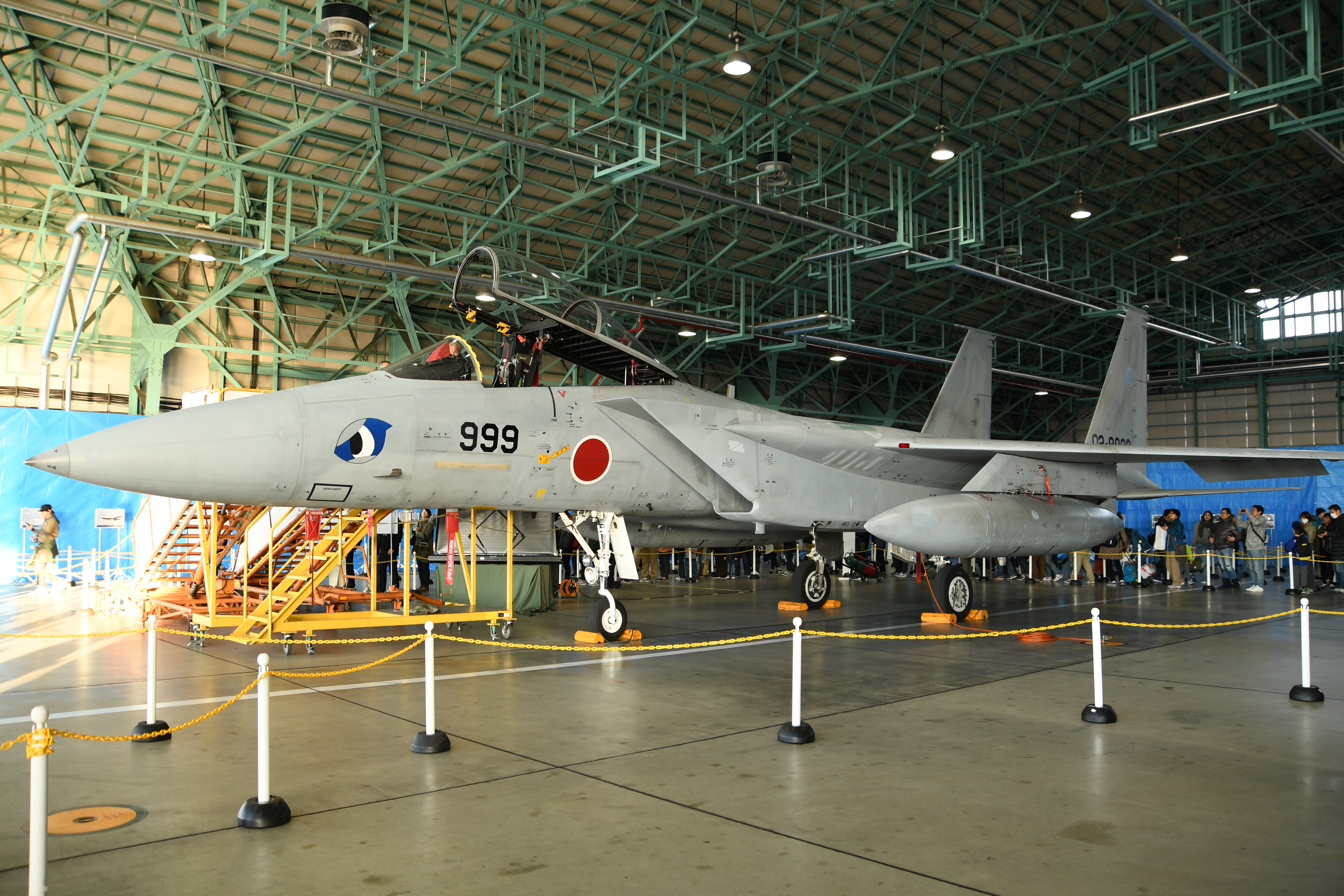
JASDF F-15J(12–8928, Hisone to Masotan version) left front view at Gifu Air Base November 18, 2018
