= Ayaka Shimizu =

Japanese voice actress (born 1987)

- 清水 彩香
- Born: December 19, 1987 (age 38); Osaka Prefecture, Japan
- Occupation: Voice actress
- Agent: Mausu Promotion
- Notable work: Am I Actually the Strongest? as Flay; Val × Love as Misa Saotome; Maesetsu! as Arashi Waraino; Dogeza: I Tried Asking While Kowtowing as Akari Osaka
- Height: 158 cm (5 ft 2 in)

Ayaka Shimizu (清水 彩香, Shimizu Ayaka; born December 19, 1987) is a Japanese voice actress affiliated with Mausu Promotion.

== Filmography ==
=== Anime television series ===
2008

- Antique Bakery, Female Customer, Maid

2009

- Uchi no 3 Shimai, Trainer
- Sasameki Koto, Shu Miyama Masaki
- Hajime no Ippo: New Challenger

2010

- Big Windup! Summer Tournament Arc, Haruka Hanai
- Kakkokawaii Sengen!, Miki-chan, Female Student 2
- Kimi ni Todoke, Junior High School Student C
- Bakugan Battle Brawlers Series (2010–2011), Child, Robin

2011

- Beelzebub, 2011–2012, Honoka Furuichi, Ryoko Asuka, Girl C, Okazu-chan, Female Student A, Female Student C

2012

- Ginga e Kickoff!!, Female Player
- BTOOOM!, Female Students

2013

- Polar Bear Cafe, Female

2015

- Aikatsu!, Tsubaki Saionji
- God Eater, Nurse
- Shōnen Hollywood, Fan
- Sound! Euphonium, 2015–2016, Band Member
- Monster Musume: Everyday Life with Monster Girls, Gal Girl

2016

- JoJo's Bizarre Adventure: Diamond is Unbreakable, Female, Female A, Nurse
- Scared Rider Xechs, Mao Akira
- High School Fleet, Reo Wakasa, Yui Fujita
- Big Order, Female Announcer, Shiho Komatsu, Nurse Inoue, Reporter B
- Mayoiga, Mai Mai, Lovepon's Mother
- Myriad Colors Phantom World, Student, Girl

2017

- Tales of Zestiria the X, Glen's Wife
- Masamune-kun's Revenge (2017–2023), Narumi Koizumi, Kobito, Neiko's Cousin
- Atom: The Beginning, Linda Oishi
- 18if, Egoist, Newscaster, Kayo's Mother, Airi's Grandmother, Mirei's Mother
- Hitorijime My Hero, Matsuzawa, Sasanishiki, Elementary School Student Kensuke
- Magical Circle Guru Guru, Fairy B
- Two Car, Kanae Kawamata
- Juni Taisen: Zodiac War, B Country Official, Opponent's Disciple

2018

- Märchen Mädchen, 2018–2019, Misa, Isabella
- The Disastrous Life of Saiki K., Female Student B, Staff, Venus Tsukiko
- Katana Maidens: Toji No Miko, Takako Yonemura
- Pop Team Epic, Hostess B
- Kakuriyo: Bed & Breakfast for Spirits, Take, Kikuno, One-eyed Child Brother, Tube Cat A, Nakai B
- Magical Girl Site, Ai Kawano, Female Student A, Announcer
- Shinkansen Henkei Robo Shinkalion, Passerby
- Gundam Build Divers, Volunteer Coalition Diver
- Back Street Girls: Gokudolls, Yumi
- A Certain Magical Index III, 2018–2019, Engineer, Female Pilot
- Ulysses: Jeanne d'Arc and the Alchemist Knight, Prostitute B, Townswoman B
- Dakaichi: I'm Being Harassed By the Sexiest Man of the Year, Rina Sasaki

2019

- The Magnificent Kotobuki, Yuria
- One Punch Man, Announcer, Waganma, Female
- Why the Hell Are You Here, Teacher!?, Female Student, Tachibana's Mother
- We Never Learn, Nakai
- Wasteful Days of High School Girls, First-Year Female Student
- Demon Slayer: Kimetsu no Yaiba (2019–2024), Kakushi
- Val × Love, Misa Saotome
- Ahiru no Sora, Female
- Cautious Hero: The Hero Is Overpowered but Overly Cautious, Bunny Girl

2020

- Aikatsu on Parade!, Tsubaki Saionji
- Interspecies Reviewers, Mayospell
- Chihayafuru 3, Female Player
- Lapis Re:Lights, Teacher, Maid
- The Genie Family 2020, Young Woman
- King's Raid: Successors of the Will, Townsfolk
- Maesetsu!, Warashino Arashi, Student
- Fire Force Season 2, System Voice
- Is It Wrong to Try to Pick Up Girls in a Dungeon? III, Helga, Siren
- A3!, Audience
- I Tried Asking While Kowtowing, Akari Osaka, Tama Kiyaa
- Higurashi: When They Cry–Gou/Sotsu, 2020–2021, Landlady, Da Vinci's Customer
- Talentless Nana, Hitomi Hosokawa

2021

- 2.43: Seiin High School Boys Volleyball Team, Kuroba's Mother
- Horimiya, Elementary School Teacher
- That Time I Got Reincarnated as a Slime, Saika
- Vivy: Fluorite Eye's Song, Concierge Female AI
- 86: Eighty-Six, Hyades
- Fruits Basket, Maid
- Fairy Ranmaru, Female
- Edens Zero, Tanchimo
- Seirei Gensouki: Spirit Chronicles, Tenashina
- Kiyo in Kyoto: From the Maiko House, Female Student, Maiko
- Mushoku Tensei: Jobless Reincarnation, Female
- The Vampire Dies in No Time, Eli, Oba-chan, Otaku Friend C, Aunt A
- The World's Finest Assassin Gets Reincarnated in Another World as an Aristocrat, Marquis Collide
- Build Divide (2021–2022), Akiyuki Miyuki
- Mieruko-chan, Monster
- Platinum End, One's Mother
- Blue Period, Hashida's Sister

2022

- Orient, Townsfolk, Tame Goro, Brother, Musashi's Relative, Child, Mishima
- Police in a Pod, Yuta's Mother
- My Dress-Up Darling, Hanaoka-sensei, Customer
- Futsal Boys!!!!!, Kubo
- Healer Girl, People in Hospital
- 3 Seconds Later, He Turned Into a Beast, Woman A, Senior, Yuto's Mother
- Chimimo, Housekeeper
- Smile of the Arsnotoria, Enchiridion
- My Master Has No Tail, Young Tanuki B, Geisha 1
- The Eminence in Shadow, Student
- Love Flops, AI Clerk
- Bleach: Thousand-Year Blood War, Beautiful Woman

2023

- Spy Classroom
- JoJo's Bizarre Adventure: Stone Ocean, Passerby B
- Chronicles of an Aristocrat Reborn in Another World, Maid A, Townswoman
- The Dangers in My Heart, Customer C
- Am I Actually the Strongest?, Frey
- The Most Heretical Last Boss Queen: From Villainess to Savior, Marie
- Paradox Live The Animation, Female Customer, Allen's Mother
- Ragna Crimson, Women, High-Class Club Women, Townsfolk
- The Rising of the Shield Hero Season 3, Elena
- Rurouni Kenshin: Meiji Swordsman Romantic Story, Patient
- Firefighter Daigo: Rescuer in Orange, Woman A

2024

- Crayon Shin-chan, Party Guest D
- Banished from the Hero's Party, I Decided to Live a Quiet Life in the Countryside 2nd, Gem Giant Mother
- 7th Time Loop: The Villainess Enjoys a Carefree Life Married to Her Worst Enemy!, Diana
- Tales of Wedding Rings, Nefritis Mother
- Delusional Monthly Magazine, Lily
- Astro Note, Female
- The Idolmaster Shiny Colors, Reporter
- Tadaima, Okaeri, Kazuhiko's Mother
- The Irregular at Magic High School, Tsukuba Clan Head
- Wistoria: Wand and Sword, Sarissa Alfeld

2026

- Does It Count If You Lose Your Virginity to an Android?, Akane Tsuda
- Chainsmoker Cat, Kansai Neko

=== Anime films ===
- Aikatsu! ~Targeted Magical Aikatsu! Card~ (2016), Tsubaki Saionji
- Sound! Euphonium, 2016–2019, Band Member
- Zunda Horizon (2017), Hokkaido Melon
- FLCL Progressive (2018), Misaki
- High School Fleet: The Movie (2020), Reo Wakasa
- Tokyo 7th Sisters: We Will Be the Blue Sky (2021), Sumire Usuda
- Pompo: The Cinéphile (2021), Nora
- Words Bubble Up Like Soda Pop (2021)
- Kaitou Queen wa Circus ga Osuki (2022), Mari Ito
- Mobile Suit Gundam SEED Freedom (2024)

=== OVA ===
- A Town Where You Live (2014), Fuuka
- Big Order (2015), Nurse Inoue
- Myriad Colors Phantom World (2016), Student
- High School Fleet (2017), Reo Wakasa, Yui Fujita
- Masamune-kun's Revenge (2018), Nari Koiwai
- Strike the Blood IV (2020), High School Girl

=== Original net animation (ONA) ===
- Kakkokawaii Sengen! (2010), Miki-chan, Female Student 2
- Seisakura (2017), Ayaka Shimizu
- Monster Strike (2018), Krotch
- Cannon Busters, 2019, Bridge
- SD Gundam World Sangoku Soketsuden (2019), Daikyō Gundam Artemie
- The Disastrous Life of Saiki K. Restart Arc (2019), Venus Tsukiko
- PSO2 Comic (2019), Dolce
- Mouse Zoo (2022–present), Ayaka the Striped Cat
- The Way of the Househusband (2021), Sales Clerk A
- Romantic Killer (2022), Riporin

=== Video games ===
2008

- Threads of Destiny
- Valhalla Knights 2, Pixie Reiko

2009

- Ken to Mahou to Gakuenmono 2G, Pasta

2011

- Gloria Union, Phoebe, Giselle
- A Certain Scientific Railgun, Disciplinary Instructor, Waitress

2013

- Hyakki Yagyo: Kaidan Romance
- Taisho Kiitan, Momoka Katsuragi

2014

- Taisho Kiitan: Koto no Ha Sakura, Momoka Katsuragi
- Tokyo 7th Sisters, Sumire Usuda

2015

- Diss World, Majorca
- Ikusa Soul

2016

- Skullgirls, Umbrella, Feng, Ms. Victoria
- Aoki no Sky Galleon, Anahita
- Macross Δ Scramble, Chaos Operator
- Toki no Ishtaria, Daedalus, Natsuha

2017

- Blue Reflection: Sword of the Girl Who Dances in Illusions, Kaori Mitsui
- White Day: A Labyrinth Named School, Shizuku Shinomiya
- Quiz RPG: The World of Mystic Wiz, Muse
- Mahjong Touhai Colosseum, Nesco
- Seven Days: You and the Days to Come, Ichiru Hyakime
- For Whom the Alchemist Exists, Acht
- Q&Q Answers, Karen

2018

- Ring☆Dream Women's Pro-Wrestling Battle, Koto Amakasu
- Hentai Shoujo Formation Girls, Reicy Shashka
- Sen no Kaizoku, Alicia
- Danmachi Moba, Riyanan Sea Lusha
- Seikimatsu Days, Kira Amagi, Hatsuka Nezu
- Tenka Hyakken Zan, Uguisumaru Tomonari
- Genso Keiyaku Cryptoract, Sharl, Revelia, Rosalinde, Empsia
- 100% Orange Juice!, Syura

2019

- High School Fleet: Fleet Battle for Pinch!, Reo Wakasa
- Destiny Child, Kubaba [after bond release]
- LOST:SMILE memories + promises, Mihiro-san
- Azur Lane, Conte di Cavour, Giulio Cesare
- Merry Garland, Verve
- Moe Sake Box, Yuri the Black Cat

2020

- Phantasy Star Online 2, Dolce, Barletra, Lumielclair

2021

- Umamusume: Pretty Derby, 2021 - 2022, Black-haired Bobbed Umamusume
- Smile of the Arsnotoria, Enchiridion
- Jack Jeanne
- Action Taimanin, Tokiko Fuuma
- World Flipper, Memram
- Time Defenders, Achilles
- Nanarhythm Dash, Irn
- Brown Dust, Romien

2022

- LEGO Star Wars: The Skywalker Saga
- League of Angels 3, Raven

2023

- Monster Strike, 2023 - 2024, Hameln Pipe, Wakagami
- Hogwarts Legacy, Mirabel Garlick
- Street Fighter 6, Citizen

2024

- Goblin Slayer Another Adventurer Nightmare Feast
- BAR Stella Abyss, Master
