= Does It Count If You Lose Your Virginity to an Android? =

Japanese manga series

- First tankōbon volume cover, featuring Akane Tsuda (left) and Nadeshiko (right)

アンドロイドは経験人数に入りますか？？ (Andoroido wa Keiken Ninzū ni Hairimasu ka??)
- Genre: Romantic comedy; Science fiction; Yuri
- Manga
- Written by: Yakinikuteishoku
- Published by: Ichijinsha
- English publisher: NA: Seven Seas Entertainment
- Magazine: Comic Yuri Hime
- Original run: July 16, 2021 – December 18, 2025
- Volumes: 7
- Anime television series
- Directed by: Neko B
- Written by: Neko B
- Music by: ZincP
- Studio: Nyan Pollution-ω-
- Licensed by: OceanVeil
- Original network: Tokyo MX, BS11 (censored)
- Original run: January 10, 2026 – February 28, 2026
- Episodes: 8 + OVA

Does It Count If You Lose Your Virginity to an Android? (Japanese: アンドロイドは経験人数に入りますか？？, Hepburn: Andoroido wa Keiken Ninzū ni Hairimasu ka??) is a Japanese manga series written and illustrated by Yakinikuteishoku. It was serialized in Ichijinsha's Comic Yuri Hime from July 2021 to December 2025, and is licensed for an English-language release by Seven Seas Entertainment. A short-form anime television series adaptation was produced by Nyan Pollution-ω- aired from January to February 2026.

The story follows a 28-year-old Japanese office worker who is secretly a lonely alcoholic slob. During one of her late-night drunken shopping sprees, she attempts to hire a maid online, which turns out to be a sex robot, and her life is turned upside down.

== Synopsis ==
Akane Tsuda is a 28-year-old office worker in the planning department of a major electronics manufacturer. At her job, she is respected by her co-workers as being well organized and one of the most hard working in their department, but in her personal life, her room is a mess, she has a bad drinking habit, and she has never had a boyfriend. One day, in a fit of drunkenness and loneliness, she buys a sex robot named Nadeshiko. Mortified about her purchase upon sobering up the next day, Akane finds she cannot return Nadeshiko or tell her co-workers as it may cause her to lose her job. And so Akane and Nadeshiko begin an unusual cohabitation.

== Characters ==
Akane Tsuda (津田あかね, Tsuda Akane)
Voiced by: Ayaka Shimizu (on-air version), Ao Senami (Deregula version) (Japanese); Chloe Eves (English)
Nadeshiko (撫子)
Voiced by: Marika Hayase (on-air version), Yū Shiraki (Deregula version) (Japanese); Trina Deuhart (English)
Itou-san (伊藤さん, Itō-san)
Voiced by: Komaru Kurikoma (on-air and Deregula version) (Japanese); Diana Garnet (English)

== Media ==
=== Manga ===
Written and illustrated by Yakinikuteishoku, Does It Count If You Lose Your Virginity to an Android? was serialized in Ichijinsha's Comic Yuri Hime from July 16, 2021, to December 18, 2025. It was collected into seven tankōbon volumes released from February 17, 2022, to January 17, 2026.

The series is licensed for an English release in North America by Seven Seas Entertainment.

No.	Original release date	Original ISBN	English release date	English ISBN
1	February 17, 2022	978-4-7580-2369-6	April 18, 2023	978-1-68579-696-9
Chapters 1–5; Bonus (おまけ, Omake)
2	September 15, 2022	978-4-7580-2452-5	August 29, 2023	979-8-88843-005-7
Chapters 6–10; Bonus (おまけ, Omake)
3	April 18, 2023	978-4-7580-2531-7	January 23, 2024	979-8-88843-118-4
Chapters 11–15; Bonus (おまけ, Omake)
4	December 18, 2023	978-4-7580-2636-9	October 1, 2024	979-8-89160-630-2
Chapters 16–20; Bonus (おまけ, Omake)
5	September 18, 2024	978-4-7580-2762-5	April 15, 2025	979-8-89373-281-8
Chapters 21–25; Bonus: "Jun and Nadeshiko's Girl Talk" (純と撫子のガールズトーク, Jun to Nadeshiko no Gāruzutōku)
6	May 16, 2025	978-4-7580-2896-7	December 30, 2025	979-8-89561-669-7
Chapters 26–30; Bonus (おまけ, Omake)
7	January 17, 2026	978-4-7580-8919-7	September 29, 2026	979-8-89765-329-4
Chapters 31–35; Bonus (おまけ, Omake)

=== Anime ===
A short-form anime television series adaptation produced under WWWave Corporation's Deregula anime label was announced on May 13, 2025. The series was animated by Nyan Pollution-ω- and directed and written by Neko B, with Mitsuru Tsukiumi designing the characters and ZincP composing the music. It aired from January 10 to February 28, 2026, on Tokyo MX and BS11, with the AnimeFesta service streaming the Deregula version with uncensored and extended scenes of the anime. (Note: Tokyo MX listed the series premiere at 24:00 on January 9, 2026, which is effectively January 10 at midnight JST.) The theme song is "Android de Shin Jidai" (アンドロイドde新時代; 'A New Era of Android') performed by Komaru Kurikoma. OceanVeil is streaming the series.

== Reception ==
Matt Marcus, a staff writer at Okazu, gave the series an overall 8 out of 10, noting that "The premise is so nakedly (ha) transparent in its aims that even when a gag is eye-rollingly contrived [...] I find myself unable to find it distasteful." He further praised Casper Kazor's work on the localization, "there are a lot of really fun little turns of phrase that got me chortling."

Does It Count If You Lose Your Virginity to an Android? was featured on BookWalker's top-selling manga for 2023 and 2024.
