= Maki Kawase =

Japanese voice actress

- 河瀬 茉希
- Born: December 31, 1995 (age 30); Chiba Prefecture, Japan
- Occupation: Voice actress
- Agent: Arts Vision
- Known for: Alya Sometimes Hides Her Feelings in Russian as Chisaki Sarashina; Dragon Pilot: Hisone and Masotan as Elle Hoshino; Zombie Land Saga as Junko Konno; Val × Love as Yakumo Saotome; Monster Girl Doctor as Kunai Zenow; Kuma Kuma Kuma Bear as Yuna; KonoSuba Fantastic Days as Lia

Maki Kawase (河瀬 茉希, Kawase Maki; born December 31, 1995) is a Japanese voice actress from Chiba Prefecture who is affiliated with Arts Vision. She played her first main role in 2018, voicing the character Elle Hoshino in the anime television series Dragon Pilot: Hisone and Masotan. She is also known for her roles as Junko Konno in Zombie Land Saga, Yakumo Saotome in Val × Love, Lia in Konosuba Fantastic Days, Kunai Zenow in Monster Girl Doctor, and Yuna in Kuma Kuma Kuma Bear.

== Biography ==
Kawase was born in Chiba Prefecture on December 31, 1995. From her elementary school years, she had an interest in manga, which was influenced by her frequent visits to her aunt's house. She first discovered the voice acting profession after learning that a manga that she was reading was receiving an anime adaptation. During her second year in high school, her friends invited her to an event that had a voice actor as a guest speaker. At the time, she was more interested in the work being promoted itself than the guest, but after seeing the guest speak lines, she was impressed to the point of already looking for a voice acting training center after the event finished.

During her third year of high school, Kawase enrolled at the Japan Narration Acting Institute, a school she chose because classes were held once a week and high school students were allowed to attend. She also worked part-time in order to pay for the tuition. During her studies, she was surprised to learn that voice actors were expected to learn how to sing and dance as well. After finishing her training program, she became affiliated with the talent agency Arts Vision after passing an audition. Her first voice acting role was in a mobile game, while her first main role was as the character Elle Hoshino in the 2018 anime television series Dragon Pilot: Hisone and Masotan. Later in 2018, she was cast in the role of Junko Konno in the anime series Zombie Land Saga.

In 2019, she played the role of Yakumo Saotome in the anime series Val × Love. In 2020, she provided the voice of Yuna, the protagonist of the anime series Kuma Kuma Kuma Bear, where she also performs the ending theme "Ano ne." (あのね。).

== Filmography ==
=== Anime ===
2015

- Shimajirō no Wao!
- Case Closed as Student B (episode 784)

2017

- Seiren as Customer (episode 9), Schoolgirl (episode 12)
- A Centaur's Life as Towako Yachiyoda

2018

- Dragon Pilot: Hisone and Masotan as Elle Hoshino
- The Master of Ragnarok & Blesser of Einherjar as Ingrid
- Zombie Land Saga as Junko Konno
- The Girl in Twilight

2019

- Boogiepop and Others as Shizuko Imazaki (episode 4)
- Kaguya-sama: Love Is War as Schoolgirl B (episode 5)
- Domestic Girlfriend as Yanase (episode 12)
- Fruits Basket as Schoolgirl (episode 2)
- Why the Hell are You Here, Teacher!? as Ichiro Sato (young)
- Vinland Saga as Askeladd (young; episodes 17 and 22)
- Kandagawa Jet Girls as Kiriko Yoshitoku
- Wasteful Days of High School Girls as Fine gal (episodes 5 and 6)
- Val × Love as Yakumo Saotome
- Didn't I Say to Make My Abilities Average in the Next Life?! as Marcela

2020

- Major 2nd as Yayoi Sawa
- Tamayomi as Chikage Asakura and Riko Shirai
- Monster Girl Doctor as Kunai Zenow
- Kuma Kuma Kuma Bear as Yuna
- Talentless Nana as Detective

2021

- Zombie Land Saga Revenge as Junko Konno
- How Not to Summon a Demon Lord Ω as Tria
- The Faraway Paladin as Will
- Magia Record: Puella Magi Madoka Magica Side Story as Ryou Midori

2022

- Aoashi as Hana Ichijō
- Summer Time Rendering as Tokiko Hishigata
- The Rising of the Shield Hero Season 2 as Yomogi Emarl
- Lycoris Recoil as Fuki Harukawa
- Duel Masters Win as Bowie Obochiyama
- Bocchi the Rock! as Shima Iwashita

2023

- Is It Wrong to Try to Pick Up Girls in a Dungeon? IV as Noin
- The Ancient Magus' Bride Season 2 as Philomela Sergeant
- Kuma Kuma Kuma Bear Punch! as Yuna
- Magical Destroyers as Eve
- My Daughter Left the Nest and Returned an S-Rank Adventurer as Anessa

2024

- Alya Sometimes Hides Her Feelings in Russian as Chisaki Sarashina
- How I Attended an All-Guy's Mixer as Karasuba
- Murder Mystery of the Dead as Fumika Shinohara

2025

- Mono as Kako Komada
- Hotel Inhumans as Chetana
- My Dress-Up Darling Season 2 as Akira Ogata
- Dusk Beyond the End of the World as Haniyama

2026

- An Adventurer's Daily Grind at Age 29 as Tanya
- Snowball Earth as Riko Akagi
- Mistress Kanan Is Devilishly Easy as Ami
- The Food Diary of Miss Maid as Nana Komatsu
- Botan Kamiina Fully Blossoms When Drunk as Chang Chin-Lan
- The Cat and the Dragon as Chiikuro
- Mebius Dust as Dr. Yuda

=== Original net animation ===
2022

- Spriggan as Hatsuho Sasahara

2024

- Gundam: Requiem for Vengeance as Hayley Arhun

2025

- Tatsuki Fujimoto 17-26 as Rie

=== Anime films ===
2023

- Maboroshi as Hina Hara

2025

- Zombie Land Saga: Yumeginga Paradise as Junko Konno

=== Video games ===
2018

- Magia Record: Puella Magi Madoka Magica Side Story as Ryou Midori
- Cytus II as Ivy

2020

- Azur Lane as KMS Z2
- KonoSuba Fantastic Days as Lia

2021

- The Idolmaster Cinderella Girls as Tsukasa Kiryu
- The Idolmaster Cinderella Girls: Starlight Stage as Tsukasa Kiryu
- WACCA Reverse as Luin
- Blue Reflection: Second Light as Rena Miyauchi

2022

- Blue Archive as Shigure Mayoi

2023

- Disgaea 7 as Suisen
- Loop8: Summer of Gods as Machina
- Honkai: Star Rail as Xueyi
- Princess Connect as Lyrael

2025

- Trickcal: Chibi Go as Kommy

2026

- Fire Emblem: Fortune's Weave as Tialla
- The Legend of Zelda: Ocarina of Time as Saria
