= Val × Love =

Japanese manga series

- Cover of Val x Love volume 1 by Square Enix

戦×恋(ヴァルラヴ) (Varu Ravu)
- Genre: Action, fantasy, harem
- Manga
- Written by: Ryousuke Asakura
- Published by: Square Enix
- English publisher: NA: Yen Press
- Magazine: Monthly Shōnen Gangan
- Original run: December 12, 2015 – March 10, 2023
- Volumes: 16
- Anime television series
- Directed by: Takashi Naoya
- Produced by: List: Yuuki Yamaoka; Tomoyuki Oowada; Hiroo Saitou; Gaku Nakagawa; Shouta Komatsu; Genta Ozaki; Gouta Aijima; Mitsugu Iwano; Shinya Ueda; Kouki Higurashi; Shouta Watase; Toshikatsu Saitou
- Written by: Tatsuya Takahashi
- Music by: Technoboys Pulcraft Green-Fund
- Studio: Hoods Entertainment
- Licensed by: Sentai Filmworks
- Original network: AT-X, Tokyo MX, SUN, BS11
- Original run: October 5, 2019 – December 21, 2019
- Episodes: 12
- icon

Val × Love (戦×恋(ヴァルラヴ), Varu Ravu; "War × Love") is a Japanese manga series by Ryousuke Asakura. It has been serialized in Square Enix's shōnen manga magazine Monthly Shōnen Gangan since December 2015. The manga is licensed in North America by Yen Press. An anime television series adaptation by Hoods Entertainment aired from October to December 2019.

== Plot ==
Ever since he was a child, Takuma Akutsu had a scary face. He was shunned by his classmates and only attracted bad attention, such as the likes of gangsters and thugs. As a result, he developed social anxiety, unable to properly converse with people. This fact and his scary face only proceeded to exacerbate his bad reputation and he was known as a demon. One day, Takuma saves Natsuki and receives a revelation from Odin, the lord of Asgard, that the world will end soon and that it is on Takuma's shoulders to save the world. To help him with his mission, Odin sends his nine daughters, the nine Valkyries, down to Midgard/Earth. Odin then gives him his mission: he is to prove that love will save the world as it is said that the source of a maiden's strength is love.

== Characters ==
=== Main character ===
Takuma Akutsu (亜久津 拓真, Akutsu Takuma)
Voiced by: Yūya Hirose
Takuma Akutsu is an einheri deemed by Odin and is the lover of the nine Valkyrie sisters. With a strong and scary build but a timid personality, Takuma, at first, is not a good lover. However, he trains himself to become a fitting einheri. He holds Mistilteinn, one of only three Tears of Yggdrasil, given to him by Odin himself.

=== Saotome family ===
Ichika Saotome (早乙女 一千花, Saotome Ichika)
Voiced by: Yumi Uchiyama
The eldest of the nine Saotome sisters and the captain of the Valkyries, Ichika Saotome is the Valkyrie of the Spear, Brunhilde. She does not approve of Takuma as the lover of her and her sisters for a good part of the first arcs, although this attitude changes during a significant battle.
Futaba Saotome (早乙女 二葉, Saotome Futaba)
Voiced by: Yumi Hara
The second of the nine Saotome sisters, Futaba Saotome is the Valkyrie of the Castle, Gerhilde. Back in Asgard, Futaba had the nickname of Her Majesty, the Queen despite being arguably the weakest of the nine. She takes care of most of the housework when she and her siblings invaded Takuma's home.
Misa Saotome (早乙女 三沙, Saotome Misa)
Voiced by: Ayaka Shimizu
The third of the nine Saotome sisters, Misa Saotome is the Valkyrie of the String, Ortlinde. A tomboyish character, Misa is looked up to by her younger siblings as a so-called "romance master" despite having no such experience herself.
Shino Saotome (早乙女 四乃, Saotome Shino)
Voiced by: Rikako Aida
The fourth of the nine Saotome sisters, Shino Saotome is the Valkyrie of the Armor, Waltraute. She is a recluse, rarely showing her person, let alone her face. She is the Valkyrie in charge of the barriers around Takuma's resident to prevent the minions of the evil god from finding the sanctuary of the Valkyries.
Itsuyo Saotome (早乙女 五夜, Saotome Itsuyo)
Voiced by: Ai Kakuma
The fifth of the nine Saotome sisters, Itsuyo Saotome is the Valkyrie of the Chain, Schwertleite. She had transferred to Takuma's school at the beginning of the second term and became the student council president.
Mutsumi Saotome (早乙女 六海, Saotome Mutsumi)
Voiced by: Rina Hidaka
The sixth of the nine Saotome sisters, Mutsumi Saotome is the Valkyrie of the Wing, Helmwige. She is a popular idol who rarely attends school due to her work (the idol work was a job forced onto her by her sisters to allow for more opportunities for Val Love).
Natsuki Saotome (早乙女 七樹, Saotome Natsuki)
Voiced by: Kaede Hondo
The seventh of the nine Saotome sisters, Natsuki Saotome is the Valkyrie of the Blade, Siegrune, and is currently the highest-leveled Valkyrie out of the nine. She is a student at Takuma's school whose popularity warrants fan clubs even outside of her own school.
Yakumo Saotome (早乙女 八雲, Saotome Yakumo)
Voiced by: Maki Kawase
The eighth of the nine Saotome sisters, Yakumo Saotome is the Valkyrie of the Sound, Grimgerde. Out of all of the sisters, she probably hates Takuma the most, constantly teasing him although this is because she has unnaturally superhuman hearing and Takuma's constantly pounding heart annoys her.
Kururi Saotome (早乙女 九瑠璃, Saotome Kururi)
Voiced by: Kotori Koiwai
The youngest of the nine Saotome sisters, Kururi Saotome is the Valkyrie of the Cannon, Rossweisse. She has a love for robots and spends most of her time building and creating random items. However, due to her powers, Midgard, that is, Earth, materials, don't work as well as Asgardian materials and most of the items she makes doesn't last long.

=== Others ===
Sue (スー, Sū)
Voiced by: Hiyori Nitta
Tohru Inukai (犬飼 透, Inukai Tōru)
Voiced by: Daisuke Hirakawa
A student council secretary, Tohru Inukai is the human host of "The Fang", Garm.
Skuld (スクルド, Sukurudo)
Voiced by: Atsumi Tanezaki
Roskva (レスクヴァ, Resukuvua)
Voiced by: M.A.O
Ur (ウル, Uru)
Voiced by: Misato Fukuen

== Media ==
=== Manga ===
Written and illustrated by Ryousuke Asakura, Val × Love was serialized in Square Enix's shōnen manga magazine Monthly Shōnen Gangan from December 12, 2015, to March 10, 2023. The chapters were collected and released in tankōbon format by Square Enix. Sixteen tankōbon volumes were released from June 22, 2016, to May 11, 2023. The manga is licensed in North America by Yen Press.

==== Volume list ====
No.	Original release date	Original ISBN	English release date	English ISBN
1	June 22, 2016	978-4-7575-5014-8	January 30, 2018	978-0-3164-8008-6
1. The Fighting Maiden (戦うの乙女, Tatakau no Otome); 2. The Studying Maiden (勉強する乙女, Benkyō suru Otome); 3. The Binding Maiden (縛る乙女, Shibaru Otome); 4. The Bound Maiden (縛られる乙女, Shibara reru Otome)
2	October 22, 2016	978-4-7575-5124-4	April 24, 2018	978-0-3164-4693-8
5. The Serving Maiden (奉仕する乙女, Hōshi suru Otome); 6. The Secret Maiden (秘密の乙女, Himitsu no Otome); 7. The Locked Maiden (密室の乙女, Misshitsu no Otome); 8. The Unstoppable Maiden (無双する乙女, Musō suru Otome); 9. The Wet Maiden (濡れる乙女, Nureru Otome)
3	May 22, 2017	978-4-7575-5343-9	July 24, 2018	978-1-9753-5320-9
10. The Loveless Maiden (恋人のいない乙女, Koibito no Inai Otome); 11. The Believing Maiden (信じる乙女, Shinjiru Otome); 12. Meeting the Maiden (乙女に逢いに, Otome ni Ai ni); 13. The Nude Maiden (裸の乙女, Hadaka no Otome); 14. The Cutting Maiden (斬る乙女, Kiru Otome); 15. The Dancing Maiden (踊る乙女, Odoru Otome)
4	September 22, 2017	978-4-7575-5475-7	October 30, 2018	978-1-9753-5430-5
16. The Examined Maiden (診られる乙女, Mirareta Otome); 17. The Reeling Maiden (手繰る乙女, Taguru Otome); 18. The Photographed Maiden (撮られる乙女, Torareru Otome); 19. The Empowering Maiden (強くする乙女, Tsuyoku suru Otome); 20. The Touching and the Touched Maiden (触る乙女と触られる乙女, Sawaru Otome to Sawarareru Otome)
5	March 22, 2018	978-4-7575-5654-6	February 19, 2019	978-1-9753-2936-5
21. The Washing Maiden (洗う乙女, Arau Otome); 22. The Maiden's Situation (乙女の事情, Otome no Jijō); 23. The Goddess's Situation (女神の事情, Megami no Jijō); 24. The Drunk Maiden (酔う乙女, You Otome); 25. The Hiding Maiden (隠す乙女, Kakusu Otome); 26. The Weak Maiden (弱い乙女, Yowai Otome)
6	October 22, 2018	978-4-7575-5872-4	August 27, 2019	978-1-9753-8514-9
27. The Enduring Maiden (耐える乙女, Taeru Otome); 28. The Accepting Maiden (認める乙女, Mitomeru Otome); 29. The Recovering Maiden (回復する乙女, Kaifuku suru Otome); 30. The Goddess's Destruction (女神の破壊, Megami no Hakai); 31. The Maiden's Soul (乙女の魂, Otome no Tamashii); 32. The Public Bath Maiden (湯乙女, Yu Otome); 33. The Showing-Off Maiden (見せつける乙女, Misetsukeru Otome); 34. The Sleeping Nearby Maiden (添い寝する乙女, Soine suru Otome)
7	May 11, 2019	978-4-7575-6116-8	December 24, 2019	978-1-9753-0620-5
35. The Opposed Gods (対峙する神々, Taiji suru Kamigami); 36. The Pleasure Maiden (気持ちいい乙女, Kimochi ii Otome); 37. The Teased Maiden (いじられる乙女, Ijirareru Otome); 38. The Gifted Maiden (贈られる乙女, Okurareru Otome); 39. The Gifting Maiden (贈る乙女, Okuru Otome); 40. The Picked Maiden (かかれる乙女, Kakareru Otome)
8	September 12, 2019	978-4-7575-6270-7; ISBN 978-4-7575-6271-4 (SP)	April 21, 2020	978-1-9753-0900-8
41. The Resisting Maiden (反抗期の乙女, Hankōki no Otome); 42. The Spring Cleaning Maiden (大掃除する乙女, Ōsōji suru Otome); 43. The Part-Timing Maiden (バイトする乙女, Baito suru Otome); 44. The Flirty Maiden (イチャイチャする乙女, Icha icha suru Otome); 45. The Unit-Linking Maiden (ユニットを組む乙女, Yunitto o kumu Otome)
9	November 12, 2019	978-4-7575-6371-1; ISBN 978-4-7575-6372-8 (SP)	August 8, 2020	978-1-9753-1522-1
46. Kisu suru Megami (キスする女神); 47. Dēto suru Megami (デートする女神); 48. Kengaku suru Otome (見学する乙女); 49. Meru Otome (眼る乙女)
10	April 11, 2020	978-4-7575-6587-6	December 28, 2021	978-1-9753-3562-5
11	October 12, 2020	978-4-7575-6892-1	January 18, 2022	978-1-9753-3643-1
12	March 12, 2021	978-4-7575-7148-8	July 5, 2022	978-1-9753-4543-3
13	August 11, 2021	978-4-7575-7418-2	December 13, 2022	978-1-9753-4545-7
14	February 12, 2022	978-4-7575-7737-4	June 20, 2023	978-1-9753-6135-8
15	August 10, 2022	978-4-7575-8072-5	November 21, 2023	978-1-9753-6905-7
16	May 11, 2023	978-4-7575-8565-2	March 19, 2024	978-1-9753-8061-8

=== Anime ===
An anime television series adaptation was announced in the June issue of Monthly Shōnen Gangan magazine on May 11, 2019. The series is animated by Hoods Entertainment and directed by Takashi Naoya, with Tatsuya Takahashi handled the series composition, Kiyoshi Tateishi designed the characters, and TECHNOBOYS PULCRAFT GREEN-FUND composed the music. It aired from October 5 to December 21, 2019, on AT-X, Tokyo MX, SUN, and BS11. The series ran for 12 episodes. Rikako Aida performed the series' opening theme song "for...", while the nine Saotome sisters performed the series' ending theme song "Up-Date x Please!!!" in three groups with three versions. The series has been licensed by Sentai Filmworks and streamed it on Hidive.
