= List of Aikatsu! episodes =

Aikatsu! is an anime television series created and produced by Sunrise (and later by Sunrise' spin-off studio, BN Pictures) based on a card arcade game by Bandai. The series revolves around Ichigo Hoshimiya, an aspiring Japanese idol who enrolls into Starlight Academy and partakes in auditions using special Aikatsu cards. The series aired on TV Tokyo from October 8, 2012, until March 31, 2016.

The series began releasing on DVD by Bandai Visual subsidiary Happinet from March 2, 2013, with initial releases of each volume containing bonus cards that can be used with Data Carddass machines. Beginning with the second season on March 4, 2014, the series is also being released on Blu-ray Disc.

== Episodes ==
=== Season 1 ===
The opening theme for the first 25 episodes is "Signalize!" by Waka, Fūri, Sunao and Risuko whilst the ending theme is "Calendar Girl" (カレンダーガール, Karendā Gāru) by Waka, Fūri and Sunao. From episodes 26 until 50, the opening theme is "Diamond Happy" (ダイヤモンドハッピー, Daiyamondo Happī) by Waka, Fūri, and Sunao whilst the ending is "Hirari/Hitori/Kirari" (ヒラリ／ヒトリ／キラリ) by Waka, Fūri, Sunao, Remi, Moe, Eri, Yuna, and Risuko. The ending theme for episode 44 is "Kiss of the Alice Blue" (アリスブルーのキス, Arisu Burū no Kisu) by Rey.

No.	Title	Original release date
1	"I Can Become an Idol?"; Transliteration: "Watashi ga Aidoru ni nattemo?" (Japanese: 私がアイドルになっても?)	October 8, 2012
2	"Idols Everywhere!"; Transliteration: "Aidoru ga Ippai!" (Japanese: アイドルがいっぱい！)	October 15, 2012
3	"I Wanted to Know More About You"; Transliteration: "Anata o Motto Shiritakute" (Japanese: あなたをもっと知りたくて)	October 22, 2012
4	"Oh! My! Fan!"	October 29, 2012
5	"Ran! Runway!"; Transliteration: "Ran! Ranwei!" (Japanese: ラン! ランウェイ!)	November 5, 2012
6	"Absorbed in Signing Autographs!"; Transliteration: "Sain ni Muchū!" (Japanese: サインに夢中!)	November 12, 2012
7	"The Trouble with Sparkler"; Transliteration: "Tsubuyaki ni Goyōjin" (Japanese: つぶやきにご用心)	November 19, 2012
8	"Underground Sun"; Transliteration: "Chika no Taiyō" (Japanese: 地下の太陽)	November 26, 2012
9	"Move on Now!"	December 3, 2012
10	"Rainbow-colored Otome"; Transliteration: "Niji-iro no Otome" (Japanese: 虹色のおとめ)	December 10, 2012
11	"Otome is in Love With Someone"; Transliteration: "Otome wa Dareka ni Koi Shiteru" (Japanese: おとめは誰かに恋してる)	December 17, 2012
12	"We Wish You a Merry Christmas!"	December 24, 2012
13	"Tragedy of Calories"; Transliteration: "Karorī no Higeki" (Japanese: カロリーの悲劇)	January 7, 2013
14	"Naughty Detectives"; Transliteration: "Ikenai Deka" (Japanese: イケナイ刑事)	January 14, 2013
15	"Camphor Tree Love"; Transliteration: "Kusunoki no Koi" (Japanese: クスノキの恋)	January 21, 2013
16	"Heart-pounding! Special Live (Part 1)"; Transliteration: "Dokkidoki!! Supesharu Raibu Part 1" (Japanese: ドッキドキ!! スペシャルライブ PART 1)	January 28, 2013
17	"Heart-pounding! Special Live (Part 2)"; Transliteration: "Dokkidoki!! Supesharu Raibu Part 2" (Japanese: ドッキドキ!! スペシャルライブ Part 2)	February 4, 2013
18	"A Little Chocolate Love"; Transliteration: "Chokotto Rabu" (Japanese: チョコっとらぶ)	February 11, 2013
19	"The Secret Scent of the Moonlit Girl"; Transliteration: "Tsukiyo no Anoko wa Himitsu no Kaori" (Japanese: 月夜のあの娘は秘密の香り)	February 18, 2013
20	"Vampire Scandal"; Transliteration: "Banpaia Sukyandaru" (Japanese: ヴァンパイアスキャンダル)	February 25, 2013
21	"Stylish Phantom Thief Swallowtail"; Transliteration: "Oshare Kaitō Suwarōteiru" (Japanese: オシャレ怪盗☆スワロウテイル)	March 4, 2013
22	"Idol Aura and Calendar Girl"; Transliteration: "Aidoru Ōra to Karendā Gāru" (Japanese: アイドルオーラとカレンダーガール)	March 11, 2013
23	"Swallowtail's Muse"; Transliteration: "Ageha na Myūzu" (Japanese: アゲハなミューズ)	March 18, 2013
24	"Enjoy Off-time"; Transliteration: "Enjoi Ofu-taimu" (Japanese: エンジョイ♪オフタイム)	March 25, 2013
25	"An April Fool Promise"; Transliteration: "Eipuriru Fūru no Yakusoku" (Japanese: エイプリルフールのやくそく☆)	April 4, 2013
26	"The Cherry Blossom Season"; Transliteration: "Sakura no Kisetsu" (Japanese: さくらの季節)	April 11, 2013
27	"Raise the Curtain: Fresh Girls' Cup"; Transliteration: "Kaimaku: Furesshu Gāruzu Kappu" (Japanese: 開幕☆フレッシュガールズカップ)	April 18, 2013
28	"Mizuki and Turtle"; Transliteration: "Mizuki to Suppon" (Japanese: 美月とスッポン)	April 25, 2013
29	"Idol Teacher"; Transliteration: "Aidoru Tīchā" (Japanese: アイドル☆ティーチャー)	May 2, 2013
30	"Cordial Call & Response"; Transliteration: "Magokoro no Kōru & Resuponsu" (Japanese: 真心のコール＆レスポンス)	May 9, 2013
31	"An Idol on Mother's Day"; Transliteration: "Haha no Hi wa Aidoru" (Japanese: 母の日はアイドル)	May 16, 2013
32	"Ichigo Panic"; Transliteration: "Ichigo Panikku" (Japanese: いちごパニック)	May 23, 2013
33	"Chance & Try"; Transliteration: "Chansu & Torai" (Japanese: チャンス&トライ☆)	May 30, 2013
34	"Hello☆Super Idol"; Transliteration: "Hello☆Sūpā Aidoru" (Japanese: Hello☆スーパーアイドル)	June 6, 2013
35	"Star of Tears"; Transliteration: "Namida no Hoshi" (Japanese: 涙の星)	June 13, 2013
36	"Tristar Take-off"; Transliteration: "Toraisutā Teiku-ofu☆" (Japanese: トライスターテイクオフ☆)	June 20, 2013
37	"Head For the Sun"; Transliteration: "Taiyō ni Mukatte" (Japanese: 太陽に向かって)	June 27, 2013
38	"Strawberry Parfait"; Transliteration: "Sutoroberī Pafe" (Japanese: ストロベリーパフェ♪)	July 4, 2013
39	"Shine On, Soleil!"; Transliteration: "Soreyuke, Soreiyu!" (Japanese: それゆけ, ソレイユ!)	July 11, 2013
40	"Girl Meets Girl"	July 18, 2013
41	"Summer-colored Miracle"; Transliteration: "Natsuiro Mirakuru" (Japanese: 夏色ミラクル☆)	July 25, 2013
42	"Shipboard Finale☆"; Transliteration: "Senjō no Fināre☆" (Japanese: 船上のフィナーレ☆)	August 1, 2013
43	"Idol in Wonderland!"; Transliteration: "Fushigi no Kuni no Aidoru!" (Japanese: 不思議の国のアイドル!)	August 8, 2013
44	"More Than True Crisis!"	August 15, 2013
45	"Happy Summer Vacation"; Transliteration: "Hapi Sama Bakēshon" (Japanese: ハピサマ☆バケーション)	August 22, 2013
46	"Respect J" (Japanese: リスペクトJ)	August 29, 2013
47	"Legendary Idols, Masquerade"; Transliteration: "Rejendo Aidoru, Masukarēdo" (Japanese: レジェンドアイドル・マスカレード)	September 5, 2013
48	"Wake Up My Music♪"	September 12, 2013
49	"The Place Where Brilliance is Heading"; Transliteration: "Kagayaki ga Mukau Basho" (Japanese: 輝きが向かう場所)	September 19, 2013
50	"Memories Await in the Future"; Transliteration: "Omoide wa Mirai no Naka ni" (Japanese: 思い出は未来の中に)	September 26, 2013

=== Season 2 ===
From episodes 51 until 75, the opening theme is "Kira Power" by Waka, Fūri and Sunao whilst the ending theme is "Original Star" (オリジナルスター☆彡, Orijinaru Sutā) by Waka, Fūri, Sunao, Remi, Moe, Eri, Yuna, and Risuko. From episodes 76 until 101, the opening theme is "Shining Line" by Waka, Fūri, and Yuna; the ending theme is "Precious" by Risuko, Waka, Fūri, and Mona.

No.	Season No.	Title	Original release date
51	1	"That Rock Girl is a Dream Girl"; Transliteration: "Rokku na Ano Ko wa Dorīmu☆Gāru" (Japanese: ロックなあの娘はドリーム☆ガール)	October 3, 2013
52	2	"Welcome Home, Strawberry"; Transliteration: "Okaeri, Sutoroberī" (Japanese: おかえり♪ストロベリー)	October 10, 2013
53	3	"Lalala Rival"; Transliteration: "Rarara Raibaru" (Japanese: ラララ☆★ライバル)	October 17, 2013
54	4	"Secret of Smiles"; Transliteration: "Egao no Himitsu" (Japanese: 笑顔のヒミツ)	October 24, 2013
55	5	"The Password is OK-OK-Okay"; Transliteration: "Aikotoba wa Oke Oke Okkē" (Japanese: 合い言葉はオケオケオッケー☆)	October 31, 2013
56	6	"Top Secret of Love"; Transliteration: "Koi no Toppu Shīkuretto" (Japanese: 恋のトップシークレット)	November 7, 2013
57	7	"Mascot Cha-Ran-Way"; Transliteration: "Yuru Kya-Ran-Wei!" (Japanese: ゆるキャ蘭ウェイ！)	November 14, 2013
58	8	"Magical Dancing"; Transliteration: "Majikaru Danshingu" (Japanese: マジカルダンシング)	November 21, 2013
59	9	"Wrap It Up! Choco-Pop Detective"; Transliteration: "Chokotto Kaiketsu! Choko-Poppu Tantei" (Japanese: ちょこっと解決☆チョコポップ探偵)	November 28, 2013
60	10	"The Fabled Powa-Puri"; Transliteration: "Uwasa no Powa-Puri" (Japanese: ウワサのぽわプリ☆)	December 5, 2013
61	11	"Sparkle Drip Magic"; Transliteration: "Kira Pata Majikku" (Japanese: キラ・パタ・マジック☆)	December 12, 2013
62	12	"The Idol is Santa Claus!"; Transliteration: "Aidoru wa Santa Kurōsu!" (Japanese: アイドルはサンタクロース！)	December 19, 2013
63	13	"Red and White Aikatsu Battle!"; Transliteration: "Kōhaku Aikatsu Gassen!" (Japanese: 紅白アイカツ合戦!)	December 26, 2013
64	14	"Lucky Idol"; Transliteration: "Rakkī Aidoru" (Japanese: ラッキーアイドル☆)	January 9, 2014
65	15	"Door Towards the Dream"; Transliteration: "Yume e no Tobira" (Japanese: 夢への扉)	January 16, 2014
66	16	"Beautiful Mutual Feelings"; Transliteration: "Suteki na Ryō-omoi" (Japanese: ステキな両思い)	January 23, 2014
67	17	"Fortune Compass"; Transliteration: "Fōchun Konpasu" (Japanese: フォーチュンコンパス☆)	January 30, 2014
68	18	"Flower-Blooming Aurora Princess"; Transliteration: "Hanasaku Ōrora Purinsesu" (Japanese: 花咲くオーロラプリンセス)	February 6, 2014
69	19	"Hosting Heart"; Transliteration: "Omotenashi Hāto" (Japanese: おもてなしハート)	February 13, 2014
70	20	"Stylish Explorers: Cool Angels!"; Transliteration: "Oshare Tanken-tai: Kūru Enjerusu!" (Japanese: おしゃれ探検隊 クールエンジェルス！)	February 20, 2014
71	21	"The Glittering Aquarius"; Transliteration: "Kirameki wa Akueriasu" (Japanese: キラめきはアクエリアス)	February 27, 2014
72	22	"Happy☆Idol Fest 1st Day!"; Transliteration: "Happi☆Idoru Fesu 1st Day!" (Japanese: ハッピィ☆アイドルフェス 1st Day!)	March 6, 2014
73	23	"Happy☆Idol Fest 2nd Day!"; Transliteration: "Happy☆Idoru Fesu 2nd Day!" (Japanese: ハッピィ☆アイドルフェス 2nd Day!)	March 13, 2014
74	24	"Cherry Blossom-colored Memories"; Transliteration: "Sakura-iro Memorīzu" (Japanese: 桜色メモリーズ)	March 20, 2014
75	25	"Again Off-time"; Transliteration: "Agein Ofu-taimu" (Japanese: アゲイン♪オフタイム)	March 27, 2014
76	26	"Shocking Fresh Girl!"; Transliteration: "Bikkuri Furesshu Gāru!" (Japanese: びっくり☆フレッシュガール!)	April 3, 2014
77	27	"Let's Aim To Be Stars"; Transliteration: "Mezashiteru Sutā" (Japanese: 目指してるスター☆彡)	April 10, 2014
78	28	"The Miracle Begins!"; Transliteration: "Mirakuru Hajimaru!" (Japanese: ミラクルはじまる！)	April 17, 2014
79	29	"Yes! Best Partner" (Japanese: Yes！ベストパートナー)	April 24, 2014
80	30	"Aikatsu! Boot Camp"; Transliteration: "Aikatsu! Būto Kyanpu" (Japanese: アイカツ！ブートキャンプ)	May 1, 2014
81	31	"Vi-Vi-Vi Partner"; Transliteration: "Bi-Bi-Bi Pātonā" (Japanese: ビビビッ☆パートナー)	May 8, 2014
82	32	"Aim For the Greatest Partners"; Transliteration: "Mezase Saikō no Pātonā" (Japanese: めざせ☆最高のパートナー)	May 15, 2014
83	33	"Otome Rainbow!" (Japanese: おとめ Rainbow！)	May 22, 2014
84	34	"Blooming Miracle!"; Transliteration: "Saite Mirakuru！" (Japanese: 咲いてミラクル！)	May 29, 2014
85	35	"Moon Desert's Rhapsody"; Transliteration: "Tsuki no Sabaku no Rapusodī" (Japanese: 月の砂漠の幻想曲（ラプソディー）)	June 5, 2014
86	36	"My Dear Idol!"; Transliteration: "Mai Dia Aidoru!" (Japanese: マイ ディア アイドル!)	June 12, 2014
87	37	"Soleil Rising"; Transliteration: "Soreiyu Raijingu" (Japanese: ソレイユ☆ライジング)	June 19, 2014
88	38	"Where Legends Are Born"; Transliteration: "Densetsu na Tsumugu Basho" (Japanese: 伝説なつむぐ場所)	June 26, 2014
89	39	"Admiration is Forever"; Transliteration: "Akogare wa Eien ni" (Japanese: あこがれは永遠に)	July 3, 2014
90	40	"Glittering Futuring Girl"; Transliteration: "Hirameku Mirai Gāru" (Japanese: ひらめく✩未来ガール)	July 10, 2014
91	41	"Assemble Aikatsu8"; Transliteration: "Kessei Aikatsu8" (Japanese: 結成☆アイカツ８)	July 17, 2014
92	42	"Summer Idol Story"; Transliteration: "Samā Aidoru Sutōrī" (Japanese: サマーアイドルストーリー)	July 24, 2014
93	43	"Twinkle Stars"; Transliteration: "Tinkuru Sutāzu" (Japanese: トゥインクル・スターズ)	July 31, 2014
94	44	"Two Wings"; Transliteration: "Futatsu no Tsubasa" (Japanese: ふたつの翼)	August 7, 2014
95	45	"A Place Where Dreams Bloom"; Transliteration: "Yume no Saku Basho" (Japanese: 夢の咲く場所)	August 14, 2014
96	46	"Let's! Akari Summer"; Transliteration: "Rettsu! Akari Samā" (Japanese: レッツ！あかりサマー)	August 21, 2014
97	47	"The Secret Letter and the Invisible Star"; Transliteration: "Himitsu no Tegami to Mienai Hoshi" (Japanese: 秘密の手紙と見えない星)	August 28, 2014
98	48	"Twin Dresses"; Transliteration: "Futago no Doresu" (Japanese: ふたごのドレス)	September 4, 2014
99	49	"The Flower's Tears"; Transliteration: "Hana no Namida" (Japanese: 花の涙)	September 11, 2014
100	50	"The Wings to Our Dreams"; Transliteration: "Yume e no Tsubasa" (Japanese: 夢へのツバサ)	September 18, 2014
101	51	"The Shining Line of Admiration"; Transliteration: "Akogare no Shining Line" (Japanese: 憧れのShining Line)	September 25, 2014

=== Season 3 ===
From episodes 102 until 126, the opening and ending themes respectively are "Du-Du-Wa Do It!!" by Ruka, Mona, Miki, and Waka and "Good morning my dream" by Ruka, Mona, and Miki. From episodes 127 until 152, the opening and ending themes respectively are "Lovely Party Collection" and "Tutu Ballerina" (チュチュ・バレリーナ, Chuchu Barerina) – both performed Mona, Ruka, and Miki.

No.	Season no.	Title	Original release date
102	1	"Let's Aikatsu☆Ready Go!!"; Transliteration: "Aikatsu Shiyō☆Ready Go!!" (Japanese: アイカツしよう☆Ready Go!!)	October 2, 2014
103	2	"Good Fortune"; Transliteration: "Ī Koto Uranai" (Japanese: いいこと占い)	October 9, 2014
104	3	"Aikatsu Dash!"; Transliteration: "Aikatsu Dasshu!" (Japanese: アイカツダッシュ！)	October 16, 2014
105	4	"Effervescent Sparkle"; Transliteration: "Hajikeru Hirameki" (Japanese: はじけるヒラメキ☆)	October 23, 2014
106	5	"Idol Halloween"; Transliteration: "Aidoru Harouin" (Japanese: アイドル☆ハロウィン)	October 30, 2014
107	6	"Two Dreamers"; Transliteration: "Futari no Dorīmā" (Japanese: 2人のドリーマー)	November 6, 2014
108	7	"Gather Your Feelings Into an Apple"; Transliteration: "Omoi wa Ringo ni Komete" (Japanese: 想いはリンゴにこめて)	November 13, 2014
109	8	"Aikatsu's Hot Wind!"; Transliteration: "Aikatsu no Atsui Kaze!" (Japanese: アイカツのアツい風！)	November 20, 2014
110	9	"The Passionate Sangria Rosa"; Transliteration: "Jōnetsu no Sanguria Rossa" (Japanese: 情熱のサングリアロッサ)	November 27, 2014
111	10	"Dear My Fan!"; Transliteration: "Dia Mai Fan!" (Japanese: ディア マイ ファン！)	December 4, 2014
112	11	"Go Go! Ichigo Cheer Squad"; Transliteration: "Go Go! Ichigo Ōen-tai" (Japanese: GOGO！いちご応援隊)	December 11, 2014
113	12	"Stylish Vivid Girl"; Transliteration: "Oshare Vividdo Gāru" (Japanese: オシャレ☆ヴィヴィッドガール)	December 18, 2014
114	13	"Happy Tree Christmas☆"; Transliteration: "Happī Tsurī Kurisumasu" (Japanese: ハッピーツリークリスマス☆)	December 25, 2014
115	14	"Unwind Japanese New Year"; Transliteration: "Hokkori Kazumasatsuki" (Japanese: ほっこり☆和正月)	January 8, 2015
116	15	"Ōzora Jump!!" (Japanese: 大空JUMP!!)	January 15, 2015
117	16	"Sumire-Colored Singing Voice"; Transliteration: "Utagoe wa Sumire-iro" (Japanese: 歌声はスミレ色)	January 22, 2015
118	17	"An Elegant Aikatsu!"; Transliteration: "Miyabi na Aikatsu!" (Japanese: みやびなアイカツ!)	January 29, 2015
119	18	"The Nadeshiko's Dance!"; Transliteration: "Nadeshiko no Mai!" (Japanese: ナデシコの舞い!)	February 5, 2015
120	19	"Star Valentine"; Transliteration: "Sutā Barentain" (Japanese: スター☆バレンタイン)	February 12, 2015
121	20	"A Promise to the Future!"; Transliteration: "Mirai ni Yakusoku!" (Japanese: 未来に約束!)	February 19, 2015
122	21	"Vampire Mystery"; Transliteration: "Vanpaia Misuterī" (Japanese: ヴァンパイアミステリー)	February 26, 2015
123	22	"Spring Bouquet"; Transliteration: "Haru no Būke" (Japanese: 春のブーケ)	March 5, 2015
124	23	"The Queen's Flower"; Transliteration: "Kuīn no Hana" (Japanese: クイーンの花)	March 12, 2015
125	24	"The Other Side of Admiration"; Transliteration: "Akogare no Mukōgawa" (Japanese: あこがれの向こう側)	March 19, 2015
126	25	"A Warm Off-time"; Transliteration: "Pokkapoka Ofu Taimu" (Japanese: ぽっかぽか♪オフタイム)	March 26, 2015
127	26	"Starry Sky Entrance"; Transliteration: "Hoshizora Entoransu" (Japanese: 星空エントランス☆)	April 2, 2015
128	27	"Showtime of Dreams"; Transliteration: "Yume no Shōtaimu" (Japanese: 夢のショータイム)	April 9, 2015
129	28	"Talk Show Runway"; Transliteration: "Tōku no Hanamichi" (Japanese: トークの花道)	April 16, 2015
130	29	"Unit Magic"; Transliteration: "Yunitto no Mahō" (Japanese: ユニットの魔法)	April 23, 2015
131	30	"The Radiant Dancing Diva"; Transliteration: "Kagayaki no Danshingu Dīva" (Japanese: 輝きのダンシングディーヴァ)	April 30, 2015
132	31	"The Burning Passionate Jalapeño!"; Transliteration: "Shakunetsu no Jōnetsu Harapēnyo!" (Japanese: 灼熱の情熱ハラペーニョ!)	May 7, 2015
133	32	"Hello New World"; Transliteration: "Harō Nyū Wārudo" (Japanese: ハローニューワールド)	May 14, 2015
134	33	"Spontaneous Skips"; Transliteration: "Omowazusu Sukippuzu" (Japanese: おもわずスキップス♪)	May 21, 2015
135	34	"The World is Centered Around Kokone!"; Transliteration: "Sekai no Chūshin wa Kokone!" (Japanese: 世界の中心はここね！)	May 28, 2015
136	35	"The Name is, Fluffy Sweet Nadeshiko"; Transliteration: "Sono Na mo, AmaFuwa Nadeshiko" (Japanese: その名も、あまふわ☆なでしこ)	June 4, 2015
137	36	"Exciting Unit Cup"; Transliteration: "Waku-waku Yunitto Kappu" (Japanese: ワクワク☆ユニットカップ)	June 11, 2015
138	37	"Unadorned Brilliance"; Transliteration: "Sugao no Kagayaki" (Japanese: 素顔の輝き☆)	June 18, 2015
139	38	"Johnny and the Bride"; Transliteration: "Jonī to Hanayome" (Japanese: ジョニーと花嫁)	June 25, 2015
140	39	"Aikatsu Restaurant"; Transliteration: "Aikatsu Resutoran" (Japanese: アイカツレストラン)	July 2, 2015
141	40	"Hot Spicy Girls!"; Transliteration: "Hotto Supaishī Gāruzu!" (Japanese: ホットスパイシー・ガールズ！)	July 9, 2015
142	41	"I Want to Say Thank You"; Transliteration: "Arigatō ga Iitakute" (Japanese: ありがとうが言いたくて)	July 16, 2015
143	42	"Horror!? Summer Island"; Transliteration: "Senritsu!? Samā Airando" (Japanese: 戦慄！？サマーアイランド)	July 23, 2015
144	43	"The Great Candid Idol Operation"; Transliteration: "Dokkiri Aidoru Daisakusen" (Japanese: ドッキリアイドル大作戦)	July 30, 2015
145	44	"Hot Summer Festival"; Transliteration: "Atsui Natsumatsuri" (Japanese: アツい夏祭り)	August 6, 2015
146	45	"The Three of Us Once Again"; Transliteration: "Mō Ichido San'nin de" (Japanese: もういちど三人で)	August 13, 2015
147	46	"The Dazzling Luminas"; Transliteration: "Kagayaki no Ruminasu" (Japanese: 輝きのルミナス)	August 20, 2015
148	47	"Raise the Curtain, the Great Starlight School Festival"; Transliteration: "Kaimaku, Dai Sutāraito Gakuen-sai☆" (Japanese: 開幕、大スターライト学園祭☆)	August 27, 2015
149	48	"Our Different Colors"; Transliteration: "Fuzoroi no Karā-tachi" (Japanese: ふぞろいのカラーたち)	September 3, 2015
150	49	"The Bond Between Stars"; Transliteration: "Hoshi no Kizuna" (Japanese: 星の絆)	September 10, 2015
151	50	"Light of the Stage"; Transliteration: "Sutēji no Hikari" (Japanese: ステージの光)	September 17, 2015
152	51	"The Road Following the Encounter"; Transliteration: "Deai ni Tsuzuku Michi" (Japanese: 出会いに続く道)	September 24, 2015

=== Season 4 ===
The opening and ending themes respectively are "Start Dash Sensation" and "Lucky Train!", both performed by Ruka, Mona, and Miki.

No.	Season no.	Title	Original release date
153	1	"Let's Fly into a Vast New World!"; Transliteration: "Tobidasou, Hirogaru Sekai!" (Japanese: とびだそう、広がる世界！)	October 1, 2015
154	2	"Change Your Potato into a Mic"; Transliteration: "Jagaimo o Maiku ni Mochikaete" (Japanese: ジャガイモをマイクにもちかえて)	October 8, 2015
155	3	"Exciting Carat☆"; Transliteration: "Tokimeki Karatto☆" (Japanese: トキメキカラット☆)	October 15, 2015
156	4	"YOU! GO! KYOTO!!"	October 22, 2015
157	5	"Little Devil Happening"; Transliteration: "Koakuma Hapuningu" (Japanese: 小悪魔ハプニング)	October 29, 2015
158	6	"I Want to Meet You, Okinawa"; Transliteration: "Aitakute, Okinawa" (Japanese: 会いたくて、沖縄)	November 5, 2015
159	7	"Galaxy✩Starlight"; Transliteration: "Gyarukushī✩Sutāraito" (Japanese: ギャラクシー✩スターライト)	November 12, 2015
160	8	"Dream is Perfect Idol!"; Transliteration: "Yume wa Pāfekuto Aidoru!" (Japanese: 夢はパーフェクトアイドル!)	November 19, 2015
161	9	"Osaka Idol Story"; Transliteration: "Ōsaka Aidoru Monogatari" (Japanese: 大阪アイドルものがたり)	November 26, 2015
162	10	"✩Crazy PaniQ✩"; Transliteration: "Metcha Panikku" (Japanese: ✩めちゃパニック✩)	December 3, 2015
163	11	"Happiness Party♪"; Transliteration: "Hapinesu Pāti♪" (Japanese: ハピネスパーティ♪)	December 10, 2015
164	12	"Showstopping New Year!"; Transliteration: "Sakidori Nyū Iyā!" (Japanese: さきどりニューイヤー!)	December 17, 2015
165	13	"Luminas☆Christmas"; Transliteration: "Ruminasu Kurisumasu" (Japanese: ルミナス☆クリスマス)	December 24, 2015
166	14	"The First Wind I Found"; Transliteration: "Watashi ga Mitsuketa Saisho no Kaze" (Japanese: 私が見つけた最初の風)	January 7, 2016
167	15	"The Dream Sketchbook"; Transliteration: "Yume no Suketchibukku" (Japanese: 夢のスケッチブック)	January 14, 2016
168	16	"One Road, Different Ways"; Transliteration: "Hitotsu no Michi to, Wakare Michi" (Japanese: ひとつの道と、別れ道)	January 21, 2016
169	17	"Hinaki Miracle!"; Transliteration: "Hinaki Mirakuru!" (Japanese: ひなきミラクル！)	January 28, 2016
170	18	"An Idol's Strength"; Transliteration: "Aidoru no Chikara" (Japanese: アイドルのチカラ)	February 4, 2016
171	19	"Best Friend"; Transliteration: "Besuto Furendo" (Japanese: ベストフレンド)	February 11, 2016
172	20	"Spring DreaCarnival!"; Transliteration: "Haru no DoriaKānibaru!" (Japanese: 春のドリアカーニバル！)	February 18, 2016
173	21	"Double Miracle☆"; Transliteration: "Daburu Mirakuru☆" (Japanese: ダブルミラクル☆)	February 25, 2016
174	22	"My Move on now!" Transliteration: "Watashi no Move on now!" (Japanese: 私の Move on now!)	March 3, 2016
175	23	"The Futures We Want to Come True"; Transliteration: "Kanaetai Mirai-tachi" (Japanese: 叶えたい未来たち)	March 10, 2016
176	24	"The Queen of Roses"; Transliteration: "Ibara no Joō" (Japanese: いばらの女王)	March 17, 2016
177	25	"Looking Forward to the Future"; Transliteration: "Mirai Muki no Ima" (Japanese: 未来向きの今)	March 24, 2016
178	26	"The Greatest Present"; Transliteration: "Saikō no Puresento" (Japanese: 最高のプレセント)	March 31, 2016

=== Movies ===
No.	Title	Original release date
1	"Aikatsu! the Movie"; Transliteration: "Gekijōban Aikatsu!" (Japanese: 劇場版 アイカツ！)	December 13, 2014
2	"Aikatsu! Music Awards: The Show Where Everyone Gets an Award!"; Transliteration: "Aikatsu! Myūjikku Awādo Minna de Shō o Moratchaima Show!" (Japanese: アイカツ！ミュージックアワードみんなで賞をもらっちゃいまSHOW!)	August 22, 2015
3	"Aikatsu! The Targeted Magical Aikatsu Card"; Transliteration: "Aikatsu! Nerawareta Mahō no Aikatsu Kādo" (Japanese: アイカツ！～ねらわれた魔法のアイカツカード～)	August 13, 2016
4	"Aikatsu! 10th Story: Starway to the Future"; Transliteration: "Aikatsu! 10th Story: Mirai e no Starway" (Japanese: アイカツ！ 10th Story ～未来へのStarway～)	July 15, 2022 (short-film version); January 20, 2023 (feature-film version)
5	"Aikatsu! Memorial Stage ~Shining Unit Cup~"; Transliteration: "Aikatsu! Memoriaru Sutēji ~ Kagayaki No Yunitto Kappu ~" (Japanese: アイカツ！メモリアルステージ ～輝きのユニットカップ～)	June 20, 2025
6	"Aikatsu! × PriPara THE MOVIE -Miraculous Meeting-"; Transliteration: "Aikatsu! × PuriPara THE MOVIE -Deai no Kiseki-" (Japanese: アイカツ！×プリパラ THE MOVIE -出会いのキセキ-)	October 10, 2025

== Releases ==
=== Season 1 ===
Volume	Release date	Episodes	First-Press Extra Card(s)	Regular Edition Extras	Ref
1	March 2, 2013	1-2	DVD original Aikatsu! Card: "Girly Strawberry Ribbon"	Reversible illustrated jacket	
2	April 2, 2013	3-8	DVD original design Aikatsu! Card: "Emerald Cyber Onepiece"	Reversible illustrated jacket	
3	June 4, 2013	9-14	DVD original design Aikatsu! Card: "White Cyber No-sleeve"	Reversible illustrated jacket; Non-credit ED "Calendar Girl"; Data Carddass Aikatsu! 5th collection PV; Data Carddass Aikatsu! MV: "Idol Activity!", "Move on Now!"	
4	July 2, 2013	15-20	DVD original design Aikatsu! Card: "Girly Strawberry Onepiece"	Reversible illustrated jacket; DVD Commercials; Data Carddass Aikatsu! MV: "Signalize!", "Ponytail After School", "Glass Doll"	
5	September 3, 2013	21-26	DVD original design Aikatsu! Card: "Girly Strawberry Boots"	Reversible illustrated jacket; Non-credit new OP: "Diamond Happy"; Data Carddass Aikatsu! MV: "Calendar Girl", "Happiness on the same Earth"; Data Carddass Aikatsu! 6th collection PV	
6	October 2, 2013	27-32	DVD original design Aikatsu! Card: "Angely Bear Ribbon"	Reversible illustrated jacket; Non-credit new ED: "Hirari/Hitori/Kirari"; Data Carddass Aikatsu! MV: "Growing for a dream"; Data Carddass Aikatsu! 2014 Series: 1st collection PV.	
7	December 3, 2013	33-38	DVD original design Aikatsu! Cards: "Magenta Trio Onepiece", "Tristar High-heels", "Tristar Hair Corsage"	Reversible illustrated jacket; Data Carddass Aikatsu! MV: "Growing for a dream", "prism spiral"	
8	January 7, 2014	39-44	DVD original design Aikatsu! Cards: "Sunshine Onepiece", "Sunny Boots", "Sunny Headband"	Reversible illustrated jacket; Data Carddass Aikatsu! MV: "Diamond Happy", "Hirari/Hitori/Kirari"	
9	February 4, 2014	45-50	DVD original design Aikatsu! Card: "Starlight Tiara"	Reversible illustrated jacket; Data Carddass Aikatsu! MV: "Moonlight destiny"	

=== Season 2 ===
Volume	Release date	Episodes	First-Press Extra Card(s)	Regular Edition Extras	Ref
2nd Season Vol. 1	March 4, 2014	51-52	Aikatsu! Card: "Freeze Union Tops"	Reversible illustrated jacket; Raichi's newspaper; 8P booklet; Live scene continuous playback function	
