= Is It Wrong to Try to Pick Up Girls in a Dungeon?: Arrow of the Orion =

2019 Japanese anime film

- Promotional poster of the film
- Directed by: Katsushi Sakurabi
- Story by: Fujino Ōmori
- Based on: Is It Wrong to Try to Pick Up Girls in a Dungeon? by Fujino Ōmori
- Produced by: Yuuichirou Shiji; Ryuutarou Kawakami; Tadayuki Akita
- Starring: Yoshitsugu Matsuoka; Inori Minase; Maaya Uchida; Yoshimasa Hosoya; Soma Saito
- Cinematography: Shingo Fukuyo
- Edited by: Kentarou Tsubone
- Music by: Keiji Inai
- Production company: J.C.Staff
- Distributed by: Warner Bros. Pictures
- Release date: February 15, 2019
- Running time: 82 minutes
- Country: Japan
- Language: Japanese

Is It Wrong to Try to Pick Up Girls in a Dungeon?: Arrow of the Orion (Note: Danjon ni Deai o Motomeru no wa Machigatteiru Darō ka ー Orion no Ya ー (Japanese: 劇場版 ダンジョンに出会いを求めるのは間違っているだろうか ー オリオンの矢 ー)) is a 2019 Japanese animated fantasy film based on the light novel series Is It Wrong to Try to Pick Up Girls in a Dungeon? written by Fujino Ōmori and illustrated by Suzuhito Yasuda. The film was released on February 15, 2019, in Japan, and received limited theatrical releases in other regions later in the year. The film takes place between seasons one and two of the anime series.

== Plot ==
Bell Cranel takes part in a usual day in Orario, exploring the Dungeon alongside Liliruca Arde and Welf Crozzo, before attending the Holy Moon Festival alongside his goddess, Hestia. They notice Hermes putting on a challenge to pull a spear out of a crystal, stating whoever does will be blessed by the goddess of purity and get to take a trip outside the city. Hestia convinces Bell to do it, and when he touches the spear, he hears a voice confirming he's the one, causing the crystal to shatter. Hermes congratulates Bell and introduces the event's sponsor, Artemis, an old friend of Hestia who's happy to see her again, but shocked when she sees her embracing Bell, calling him her "Orion".

Hermes informs Hestia's group that Artemis sponsored the event in order to seek help to defeat a monster outside of Orario that her Familia had trouble dealing with. Bell questions why he should be the one since there are stronger adventurers, but Artemis insists since the spear chose him, because of his pure soul. Hestia agrees to accept the quest, with Lili and Welf also agreeing to join in.

After a week flying on dragons to their destination, the group rescues a mother and her child from some monsters. Bell easily defeats them using the spear, but Hermes warns him not to use it again. Camping for the night, the group discuss the outbreak of monsters they learned about from the mother, with Hermes wondering if it has to do with their mission. He explains that at the Elsus Ruin, there was a monster called "Antares" that was sealed off long ago, but has since started to regain power, so he and Artemis teamed up in order to defeat it, also informing them that the spear they possess is imperative to killing Antares. Before going to sleep, Hestia and Artemis talk about how they feel about Bell, with Artemis also vaguely referring to what happened with her Familia, and Hestia noting how much she's changed.

The next day, the group nearly reach their destination, but are knocked out of the sky by a barrage of light spears, causing them to crash land in a dead forest close by. They are surrounded by a group of monsters, but are saved by Ryuu Lyon, who is assisting the rest of Hermes Familia, who have been waiting for Hermes' return. Asfi explains the situation, how the monsters have been ravaging the land, and that they've been unable to reach the gate that blocks their path to Antares.

That night, Hermes and the boys attempt to spy on the ladies while they bathe, but are quickly foiled, while in the ruckus, Bell manages to escape and stumbles upon Artemis bathing alone. The two talk about her relationship with Hestia, and what kind of a hero Bell wants to become, before Artemis asks Bell for a dance. He accepts, and she talks to Bell about the 10,000 years of romance the gods were promised when they descended to Earth.

The following morning, the group plan their battle strategies, with Hermes Familia acting as decoys, while Artemis, Hermes, Bell, and the rest charge into the ruins. They're able to pass through the gate thanks to Artemis, but are left struggling with the monsters that they learn are capable of self-regeneration and evolution. Meanwhile, back in Orario, the monsters in the Dungeon have started to go berserk, leading the Guild to issue an emergency request for first-class adventurers to deal with it.

Artemis' group finally reach the location of Antares, to surprisingly find the great monster containing the crystallized body of Artemis within its chest. Hermes then reveals that the Artemis that they ventured with was merely a fragment of the original, and now with Artemis' body within it, Antares has gained the ability to utilize her divine power. As a result, Antares fires a beam of light into a crescent moon shaped scar in the sky, creating what appears to be a 2nd moon, something the Gods in Orario recognize as an Arcanum spell: "Artemis' Arrow." The Loki Familia, and eventually even Freya Familia, take charge in holding back the rampaging monsters from escaping the Dungeon.

Hermes continues to explain that the spear is actually an arrow created by Artemis powerful enough to kill even Gods, with the arrow called "Orion", leading Asfi to realize that Bell has been tasked with killing Artemis. Bell attempts to fight the beast using just his Hestia Knife and Firebolt, but proves ineffective as it simply regenerates it back, while the "fragment" Artemis manages to negate an attack to save the group, before disappearing. Bell goes into shock, and while the group act as decoys to keep Antares busy, Hestia's cries to save Artemis brings Bell to his senses. Using Orion, empowered by his Argonaut skill, Bell kills Antares, and proceeds to use his Hestia Knife to break the crystal Artemis was entrapped in, stabbing her in the heart.

An apparition of Artemis appears before Bell and reveals to him that even Gods reincarnate, though however long that may be even she doesn't know. She tearfully hopes that the next time they meet, they'll have a 10,000 year romance. Back in reality, Antares' body is destroyed and the Arcanum spell is destroyed, calming down the monsters in Orario. Outside of the ruins, Hestia consoles a morose Bell by showing him that his heroic deed not only saved Artemis, but the surrounding forest as well. Taking note of that, Bell and Hestia regroup with their friends and prepare to return home.

== Voice cast ==
Character	Japanese	English
Bell Cranel	Yoshitsugu Matsuoka	Bryson Baugus
Hestia	Inori Minase	Luci Christian
Eina Tulle	Haruka Tomatsu	Shelby Blocker
Artemis	Maaya Sakamoto	Avery Smithhart
Liliruca Arde	Maaya Uchida	Hilary Haag
Ryū Lyon	Saori Hayami	Genevieve Simmons
Aiz Wallenstein	Saori Ōnishi	Shelley Calene-Black
Syr Flover	Shizuka Ishigami	Juliet Simmons
Hermes	Soma Saito	Benjamin McLaughlin
Freya	Yōko Hikasa	Patricia Duran
Welf Crozzo	Yoshimasa Hosoya	David Wald
Loki	Yurika Kubo	Christina Kelly
Lefiya Viridis	Juri Kimura	Kelley Peters

== Production and release ==
The film was based on Is It Wrong to Try to Pick Up Girls in a Dungeon?, featuring an original story by the creator Fujino Ōmori. It was announced with the second season of the series during the GA Bunko 2018 Happyō Stage at Wonder Festival on February 18, 2018. The film was directed by Katsushi Sakurabi, with Warner Bros. distributed the film in Japan. J.C.Staff returned to animate the film, as well as the rest of the cast and staff reprised their roles. Yuka Iguchi performed the theme song "Onaji Sora no Shita" (Japanese: おなじ空の下で; Under the same sky) for the film.

The film was originally released in Japan on February 15, 2019. Sentai Filmworks licensed the film in North America and screened the film in the United States on July 23, 2019. Manga Entertainment released Blu-ray and DVD in Australasia on September 7, 2020. The film also released to some other territories.

== Reception ==
Richard Eisenbeis of Anime News Network giving it an overall score of B. He praised the film's original story, but he criticised the film "goes too big for things to believably return to the status quo at the end of the film".
