= Is It Wrong to Try to Pick Up Girls in a Dungeon? season 5 =

Is It Wrong to Try to Pick Up Girls in a Dungeon? V
- Season 5
- Key visual
- No. of episodes: 15

Release
- Original network: Tokyo MX (#1–11); Abema (#12–15)
- Original release: October 5, 2024 – March 7, 2025

Season chronology
- ← Previous; Season 4

Is It Wrong to Try to Pick Up Girls in a Dungeon? is an anime television series based on Fujino Ōmori's light novel series of the same name. The story follows the exploits of Bell Cranel, a 14 year old solo adventurer under the goddess Hestia.

The anime is produced by J.C.Staff and directed by Hideki Tachibana. A fifth season of the anime was announced at an event celebrating the 10th anniversary of the light novels in November 2023. The fifth season adapts volumes sixteen to eighteen of the light novel.

The opening theme song for the season is "Shōnen" performed by Gre4n Boyz, while the ending theme song is "Hydrate" performed by Sajou no Hana. The season began airing in October 2024, with the remaining unaired episodes premiering on Abema beginning in February and ending in March 2025.

== Episodes ==
No. overall	No. in season	Title	Directed by	Written by	Storyboarded by	Original release date
60	1	"Syr"; Transliteration: "Shiru" (Japanese: シル)	Hideki Tachibana	Hideki Shirane	Hideki Tachibana	October 5, 2024
In the aftermath of their expedition, Lili and Haruhime level up to Level 2; Hestia secretly tells Welf and Mikoto that Bell is on the verge of another level up. During a celebratory party at the Hostess of Fertility, Syr notices Ryuu being particularly flustered around Bell, and after overhearing a private conversation between them, realizes she's fallen for him. She then tells Ryuu she will be inviting Bell on a date to the upcoming Goddess Festival, which Ryuu reluctantly supports. Hestia Familia is visited by Horn, Freya's personal attendant, delivering Syr's letter of invitation, surprising everyone that Syr is supposedly part of Freya Familia. The captains of the Freya Familia led by Ottar discuss their disapproval over Bell and their plan to look after Syr during the Festival. On the way to give Syr an answer, Bell is suddenly attacked by one of Freya Familia's captains, Hedin Selland, and after being brutally beaten, is told to come with him. Elsewhere, Syr goes to speak to Freya, asking to take Bell on a date, with the Goddess approving, but stipulating if Bell finds out who she is, she can never interact with him again.
61	2	"(Master) Training"; Transliteration: "(Masutā) Chōkyō" (Japanese: 調教(マスター))	Shigeru Ueda	Hideki Shirane	Hideki Tachibana	October 12, 2024
Hedin takes Bell to a cafe, threatening him and his Familia into accepting the date with Syr; Bell sends a letter to Hestia Familia informing them he's doing it to protect them. Bell is promptly put through an endless gauntlet as Hedin trains him to be the perfect gentleman on a date, while also making him improve his social skills with other women. During the Goddess Festival, Bell and Syr proceed with their date. The Hostess maids make Hestia Familia work at the pub, allowing them to sneak out and observe the date, which is also being watched over by Hedin and several Freya Familia members. Syr becomes irritated at Bell's change in attitude, being unable to fluster him like she usually does, though his facade is broken when Ais spots them; Syr tells a concerned Ais they're on a date and they leave. Hestia, having been kicked out of the pub for causing trouble, finds Ais and proposes an alliance to spy on the date. Bell comes clean to Syr about Hedin helping him present himself better for the date, so Syr asks him if they can continue by escaping the watchful eyes of Freya Familia.
62	3	"(Odr) Partner"; Transliteration: "(Ōzu) Hanryo" (Japanese: 伴侶(オーズ))	Momo Shimizu	Miya Asakawa	Hideki Tachibana	October 19, 2024
Bell and Syr manage to escape the Freya Familia watchdogs using an invisibility cloak. Bell takes Syr to the St. Fulland Cathedral, and tells her about the legend of Fulland, a knight who teamed up with a Spirit as they fell in love, however was forced to choose between her and a saint who had supported him all the years, ultimately choosing the saint. After initially attempting to kill Fulland in despair, the Spirit would later sacrifice herself to save him from a monster attack, and he would grievously build the Cathedral in her honor. Syr asks Bell right after what he would do if she ever got so distraught she tried to hurt others. Bell then buys a two-piece charm based on the Fulland tale for Syr, with her using her half as a hairpin. Bell and Syr have dinner at a restaurant on a boat, where Ais, Hestia, and the Hostess maids are there observing them. Bell questions Syr about her secrets when the boat is suddenly attacked by Freya Familia; Ais and the Hostess maids fight them off allowing the two to escape off the boat. They spend the night walking through the city, making it to the "Heroes Bridge", where Syr tells Bell how the world is longing for a hero, and reveals that she desires an "Odr", her one-and-only hero. She then takes him to a single-bedroom inn to spend the night together, much to Bell's worry.
63	4	"(Seidr) God and Girl"; Transliteration: "(Seizu) Kami to Musume" (Japanese: 神と娘(セイズ))	Yoshihiro Mori	Hideki Shirane	Hideki Tachibana	October 26, 2024
Bell anxiously attempts to avoid sleeping in bed with Syr, but she insists. She confesses her feelings and tries to kiss him, but he stops her; she instinctively tries to Charm him before being ashamed at herself. As they fall asleep, Syr once again pleads herself to him, but Bell is unable to reciprocate. Bell wakes the next morning to find Syr gone, and talks to Welf about everything that happened, who convinces him to properly turn her down. Bell finds Syr, only for her to suddenly be attacked by Freya Familia captain Hogni, trying to kill her for interfering with the Goddess. The Hostess maids arrive, allowing the two to flee, but the maids are quickly brutalized by the captains, including the Gulliver Brothers and Anya's brother Allen. Bell and Syr hide in an abandoned building, where Bell reveals he knew that "Syr" was an imposter, stopping her from stabbing him. She tells him where the real Syr is as she is confronted by the Freya Familia captains, revealing herself to be Horn; as a child, Horn gave up her name "Syr" to Freya in order to become just like the Goddess, gaining a magic that let her transform into Freya. Horn then maniacally declares she attempted to kill Bell to prevent Freya from losing her divine self. Bell meets up with Syr, who emotionally confesses she's in love with him, leading Bell to sorrowfully rejecting her. Later, Syr transforms into her true form, Freya, declaring to Ottar that "Syr is dead" and her intention to take Bell by force.
64	5	"(Freya Familia) Invasion"; Transliteration: "(Fureiya Famiria) Shinryaku" (Japanese: 侵略(フレイヤ・ファミリア))	Momo Shimizu	Hideki Shirane	Toshihiko Masuda	November 2, 2024
Freya recalls her time "role playing" as Syr, with Horn taking her place during these times, to have fun amongst the common folk, and growing attached to the Hostess maids and Bell. Bell is depressed after rejecting Syr's confession, revealing to Ryuu he turned her down due to his feelings for Ais. Freya confronts Hestia, demanding she give Bell to him, while the Freya Familia captains easily dispose of Lili, Welf, Mikoto, and Haruhime, with Bell and Ryuu taken out by Ottar. Freya threatens to send Hestia back to Heaven if she doesn't convert Bell to her, when Hermes appears, reminding her she can't have Bell yet due to him only being in Hestia Familia for half a year; Freya compromises on simply taking Bell in the meantime. Hermes secretly schemes with Hestia to find some way to reclaim Bell, but panics when he realizes what Freya is about to do, commanding Asfi to fly herself and Ryuu out of the city, and giving Hestia a note for later. Freya commands most of the city to the town square, revealing herself as Syr and unleashing her Charm on all of Orario. Sometime later, Bell awakens in the Freya Familia home of Folkvangr, who all treat him as a member of the Familia. Bell rushes out into the city, only to find nobody can remember him, as a result of Freya's Charm, which Bell is immune to, causing everyone to believe he's always been a part of Freya Familia. After being rejected by Hestia and his Familia, Bell breaks down distraught.
65	6	"(Orario) Distorted City"; Transliteration: "(Orario) Waikyoku Toshi" (Japanese: 歪曲都市(オラリオ))	Shigeru Ueda	Shōgo Yasukawa	Toshihiko Masuda	November 9, 2024
Freya Familia healer Heith claims Bell's "fake memories" are the result of a curse, which he struggles to believe. Freya commands Horn to ensure that everyone has been Charmed, and then visits Ouranos, offering her Familia's support in exploring further in the Dungeon and preparing for the confrontation with the Black Dragon if he doesn't interfere; he reluctantly accepts. Hestia, who was able to avoid the Charm due to being a virgin Goddess, encounters both a charmed Hermes and Ais; she tells the latter not to see Bell, worried he will become vulnerable to the Charm if he starts to believe his love for Ais isn't real. That night, Bell is taken to see Freya and tells her to update his status to prove she's his Goddess. She successfully does so, secretly using a rare item called "Status Snitch", further driving Bell into confusion and despair. The next morning, Bell is forced to take part in Freya Familia's daily training, where everyone brutally fights to the death, which he in particularly is stuck having to face Hedin, Hogni, and the Gullivers. While looking for information about Bell, Eina stumbles upon her personal journal, and begins to regain her memories reading the entries, until Freya appears to take the journal and Charm her once more. After being seriously beaten and healed all day, Bell sees Freya and tells her about his memories with Hestia, as she uses information from Eina's journal to convince Bell of her truth, all in her attempt to make him feel isolated so she can be the only one to relieve him. When Bell embarrassingly runs off after trying to undress her, Freya joyously laughs to herself.
66	7	"(Loneliness) Separated"; Transliteration: "(Ronrinesu) Betsuri" (Japanese: 別離(ロンリネス))	Yūsuke Onoda	Miya Asakawa	Yūichi Nihei	November 16, 2024
Ryuu wakes up in a nearby city with Asfi, who explains the situation as they plan to re-infiltrate back into Orario. Hestia visits Ouranos in hopes of seeking his assistance, but they're unable to talk due to the charmed Fels' presence, and she is dismissed; he tasks Fels with assigning Hermes Familia to gather up firewood. The Freya Familia captains report to Freya about Bell's progress, with Hedin volunteering himself to take charge of his training, stating to have both their best interests in mind. Freya attempts to convince Bell to undergo a treatment for his "curse", in order to destroy Realis Phrase by making him believe his memories are fake, but he declines. At the Hostess of Fertility, Anya is distressed upon none of the other maids remembering Syr, and runs off after Mia says Freya made her "disappear". Allen takes her to see Freya, revealing her role as Syr as "just a game", throwing Anya further into despair. Ryuu, who had snuck back into the city with Asfi, is lured out of hiding by this revelation, with Freya attempting to favour her to her side by suggesting they share Bell. This disgusts Ryuu and she is then knocked unconscious by an upset Freya, who has her put in their home's dungeon without being Charmed. That night, Bell notices Freya's change in attitude and gets her to talk about her worries, giving her some advice. After confessing to him, Bell recognizes Syr in Freya's laughing face, causing him to be abruptly dismissed, as Freya solemnly grips the charm from their date.
67	8	"(Bell Cranel) Desires"; Transliteration: "(Beru Kuraneru) Dōkei" (Japanese: 憧憬(ベル・クラネル))	Momo Shimizu	Hideki Shirane	Katsushi Sakurabi & Teppei Okuda	November 23, 2024
Hedin has intensified his brutal training with Bell, to even the other captains' surprise, as a result of Freya's increased isolation, desiring to get Bell to submit as soon as possible. Hestia secretly rendezvous with Asfi, who informs the Goddess of Freya Familia's desperate acts toward Bell, leaving Hestia to suspect this to be the "time" Hermes suggested in his note. The exhausted Bell sleeps with Freya at night, very nearly deciding to give in and accept his current reality, but his memories of Syr still continue to linger in his head. Bell heads out into town to look for Syr, with Hedin dismissing all of the Freya Familia guards that normally follow him to focus on Loki Familia preparing to exit the Dungeon. At the Hostess of Fertility, Mia reveals to Bell she is a semi-retired member of Freya Familia, and intentionally reminds him of something she had said when they first met. Resolved to learn the truth, Bell rushes to see Ais, who vaguely remembers training and making a promise with him; he breaks down in tears glad she has confirmed his memories are real. A far more confident Bell returns to training and manages to land a scratch on Hedin. Meanwhile, while his Familia continues spreading firewood throughout the city, Hermes finds himself stuck in a loop of regaining and losing his memories, using his children to convey pieces of information back to him. While investigating, Hestia and Asfi are able to get his note to him, to "make a hearth out of Orario".
68	9	"(Vesta) Altar of the Sacred Flame"; Transliteration: "(Uesuta) Seika no Saidan" (Japanese: 聖火の祭壇(ウェスタ))	Shigeru Ueda	Hideki Shirane	Jun Yamamoto	December 7, 2024
Ryuu is freed from the Freya Familia dungeon by Horn and goes on a rampage through Folkvangr, fighting all the members. While contemplating his next move, Bell notices the destruction, but is forced to stay in his room by Heith. The guards left behind are then knocked out by someone, leading Bell to chase the culprit into a large cathedral room, learning it's Horn. She breaks down and emotionally attacks Bell until he is able to finally figure out both she and Freya are Syr. Horn then gives Bell back his Hestia Knife, and forcefully stabs herself with it. Using her magic and her connection to Freya, Horn transforms into the Syr that Freya cast aside, who breaks down over hurting so many she cares about, begging Bell to save her; he declares he will save both of them. Ottar takes Horn to be healed, while Bell confronts Freya. The Goddess continues to claim that everything she did as Syr was part of her roleplaying, smashing her charm in the process, but Bell insists all her feelings as Syr are real. The two argue, with Freya admonishing Bell wanting to "save her" despite rejecting her and having no way to stop her, while Bell calls out her ego and brushes off her affection, angering her. Suddenly, the two notice fires erupting outside; thanks to Hestia's blood put on the firewood distributed throughout the city, all the Charmed people start to feel a burning sensation within them, as Hestia uses her power to transform all of Orario into a recreation of her temple in Heaven, destroying the Charm. With their memories returned, Bell's friends in Hestia and Loki Familias, alongside everybody else in the city, storm Folkvangr in outrage. After Hestia reunites with Bell, when she asks Freya what she will do next, Freya declares a War Game.
69	10	"(War Game) The Great Faction Battle"; Transliteration: "(Wō Gēmu) Habatsu Taisen" (Japanese: 派閥大戦(ウォーゲーム))	Yoshihiro Mori	Miya Asakawa	Kiyotaka Ohata	December 14, 2024
After Freya reasons that the Guild won't punish her for her actions due to the strength of her Familia, she stipulates that if she wins the War Game, she gets Bell, but if Hestia wins, she will do whatever she desires; Hestia reluctantly agrees, and Bell states that if he wins then Freya must show him the "real her". Preparation for the War Game commences, but Loki Familia is directly banned from participating by the Guild, with Royman offering information on the 60th floor of the Dungeon to Finn to alleviate them. After Bell reunites with his Familia and Eina, they learn from Hestia the War Game will be "Hide-and-Seek", with the children duking it out to find the respective Gods. Despite their banning from the battle, Finn assists Lili in preparing as the strategist, while Tiona and Tione help to train Bell, as Ais is forbidden from doing so due to Freya's intervention. Hestia Familia's Faction consists of their friends and allies in Takemikazuchi, Miach, and Hephaestus Familias, as well as the Familias of Mord, Dormul, Luvis, the men of Rivira, and the Goddess Alliance; Ganesha Familia chooses to act as the overseers, while Hermes Familia (minus Aisha) also stay out, due to believing the odds too stacked against them. Bell levels up to Level 5, earning a new skill that makes him stronger against charms. In Folkvangr, Freya is informed about the War Game, and admits to herself keeping Ais away is her own sense of jealously. Ottar learns from Heith that Horn is currently in a "death-like state" as a result of using her magic to "keep Syr alive". Chloe and Lunoire attempt to convince a despondent Anya to join them, and is visited by someone. The day of the War Game arrives, and each side prepare in their respective camps in desolated cities, with Lili giving a rousing speech to their Faction. Cassandra tells Bell about her dream where the "wind" will be in their favour, as both sides soon prepare to fight.
70	11	"(Fólkvangr) Hell"; Transliteration: "(Fōrukuvuangu) Jigoku" (Japanese: 地獄(フォールクヴァング))	Momo Shimizu	Shōgo Yasukawa	Momo Shimizu	December 21, 2024
The War Game commences as the Hestia Faction split up to scout the relative areas in order to track down Freya and her Familia, with Lili staying back communicating with everyone through magic items. However, they learn that the entire Familia has stationed themselves at the edge of the island, turning the "Hide-and-Seek" game into a castle siege, to everyone's shock. With no other choice left, Lili orders the Faction to go all in on a full-on attack. The Faction faces against a group of charging Freya Familia members, using their Crozzo Magic Swords to successfully take out a bunch of them, only for the healers, led by Heith, to almost immediately revive them all and resume their attack. While the two sides duke it out, Mord's group tries to attack Heith directly, but she reveals the capability to heal herself, and angrily takes them all out. Hogni confronts a group of people, using his magic to transform his personality to become more confident, as he clashes with Tsubaki. Welf attempts to use his magic to disrupt Hogni, but is taken down by Allen. As Bell continues forward towards Ottar, he is attacked by Van, but now newly levelled up, easily takes him out with a Firebolt. Ottar arrives and hands Bell a longsword, allowing him one free hit of a fully charged Argonaut attack. The two unleash their strongest attacks, ending in a draw, though with Bell significantly more injured, before Ottar prepares to resume. Hogni takes out Tsubaki and begins to face Daphne, Cassandra, and Bors, while the Gullivers fight Aisha, Mikoto, and Nahza. At this time, Bell is brutalized by Ottar, who tells the young boy he must surpass him.
71	12	"(Astrea Record) Inheritance"; Transliteration: "(Asutorea Rekōdo) Keishō" (Japanese: 継承(アストレア・レコード))	Hideki Tachibana	Hideki Shirane	Hideki Tachibana	February 14, 2025 (Note: Earliest episode release on BS11)
Upon sensing a disturbance through Horn, Freya orders the War Game to be finished, leading Allen and several of the Einherjar to go on the offensive targeting the Faction's Gods. Takemikazuchi and Hephaestus distract several of them allowing Hestia to escape to the frontlines; of the 46 Gods part of the Faction, only 4 remain. Despite the overwhelming disadvantage, Lili remains calm and continues with their plan. Daphne continues to face Hogni, using her skill which grants her increased endurance, but also slowly turns her wooden. She is soon defeated and Cassandra is forced to surrender to be allowed to heal her. Just then, the "wind blows in their favour" with the arrival of Ryuu, who has achieved the first ever double level now a Level 6, able to perfectly match Hogni in combat. She is soon surrounded by several Einherjar, so activates her new skill, "Astrea Record", allowing her to utilize the skills of her fallen Astrea Familia members, and disposes of them. She resumes her fight with Hogni, who suddenly starts to feel weaker, as Ryuu reveals everyone intentionally let themselves be beaten so Hogni would overuse his cursed weapon, with the effects finally catching up to him. He is defeated, resulting in excitement from everyone watching. Heith regroups the healers prepared to heal everyone, when unexpectedly, Hedin turns on them and takes them all out.
72	13	"(Revenge) Counterattack"; Transliteration: "(Ribenji) Gyakushū" (Japanese: 逆襲(リベンジ))	Yūsuke Onoda	Shōgo Yasukawa	Toshihiko Masuda	February 21, 2025
Prior to the start of the War Game, Bell informed Lili that he believed Hedin would end up helping them, based on his attitude compared to the rest of the Familia. Heith angrily declares Hedin a traitor to Freya, but he simply rebuts he's doing what's best for the Goddess and defeats her. While he continues to take out the Einherjar, Chloe, Lunoire, and Anya join the battle to help deal with the Gulliver Brothers, with Allen heading towards them. Ryuu arrives to assist Bell in fighting Ottar, when they are also suddenly joined by Mia. Before the War Game, Loki tried to convince Mia to join, learning that she's known Freya longer than any other mortal, already aware that Syr is her true self and will only help upon hearing from the girl herself. Loki takes her and the Hostess maids, with Anya forcefully taken by Bete, to see Horn, where they hear Syr apologizing to them all and asking to save her, inspiring them to join. While Mia keeps Ottar busy, Ryuu heals Bell and asks what he wants to do with Syr, as he states he will do whatever he can to save her from her feelings of love, even despite being the one who caused it. Ryuu surprisingly confesses to Bell she's in love with him, before they resume the fighting. Anya utilizes her skill, causing everyone in the area (minus the allies using magic items to combat it) to receive a status debuff. With Haruhime giving the allies a Level Boost (despite exposing her abilities to the rest of Orario), and Lili also joining the fight, they are able to disrupt the Gullivers' teamwork enough to swiftly take them all out.
73	14	"(Einherjar) The Warriors of the Goddess"; Transliteration: "(Einheriyaru) Megami no Yūshi Tachi" (Japanese: 女神の勇士達(エインヘリヤル))	Shigeru Ueda	Hideki Shirane	Katsushi Sakurabi	February 28, 2025
Lili calls out through the occulus for any able bodies to help with the remaining battles; Welf gets up to join. A conscious Hogni berates Hedin for betraying Freya, leading the high elf to admit his jealously towards Bell for winning the Goddess' love, while also acknowledging she's happier as Syr and that Bell is the only one who can save her; Hogni admits feeling the same and agrees to join him. Chloe, Lunoire, Aisha, and Mikoto face the last standing Gulliver Brother, while Hogni assists Anya in fighting Allen. Hestia arrives to see Lili, who then commands her to bring Haruhime to the location of Ottar's fight so she can assist with her Level Boost and Hestia can update Bell's stats. Bell, Ryuu, and Mia are soon joined by Hedin in their fight against Ottar, and with Hedin's coordination skills, the four are able to overwhelm Ottar to the point of finally landing direct hits on him. Meanwhile, Anya confronts Allen about his feelings towards her, with Hogni deducing despite his claims of hatred, he merely shunned her and convinced Freya to kick her out of the Familia to protect her. Allen admits the reason he's devoted himself so much towards the Goddess is because he needs her power so that he can be strong enough to defeat the Black Dragon that ravaged their home, even if he must hurt Anya to do so; he then activates his magic, instantly defeating them. Bell's team is able to seemingly defeat Ottar, but he activates his trump card, "Beast Mode", giving him the strength to knock them all out. As they slowly stand up, Ottar criticizes them for going against the Goddess' love, while Hedin berates him for standing in the way of her happiness, as the four remain firm on their stance to defeat him.
74	15	"(Syr) First Love"; Transliteration: "(Shiru) Hatsukoi" (Japanese: 初恋(シル))	Shigeru Ueda	Hideki Shirane	Jun Yamamoto, Toshihiko Masuda & Hideki Tachibana	March 7, 2025
Hestia and Haruhime arrive on the battlefield, the latter using her magic to grant Ryuu, Mia, and Hedin a level boost, while Hestia updates Bell's stats. Once she does, Haruhime uses the last of her energy to give Bell a level boost, as he rejoins the three in their assault on Ottar. Despite the team of three Level 7's and a Level 6, Ottar's borderline Level 8 power is still enough to keep the upper hand, draining their stamina. Hedin takes a near fatal hit from Ottar, but uses his remaining strength to give Bell another significant boost in agility, entrusting saving Syr to him. With Mia and Ryuu's help, Bell pushes Ottar to his limit and manages to unleash an Argonaut-enhanced Firebolt, significantly weakening him. Despite still being able to fight, Ottar stands down, also entrusting Bell to save the Goddess. With Allen speeding his way over to stop him, Bell makes a mad dash toward Freya's tower, as everyone watching cheers on Bell to succeed. Before Allen and the Freya Familia guards can attack, Welf reveals himself and uses his magic to disrupt the attacks and takes out Allen with his magic sword. Confronting Freya, she breaks down, futilely professing her love for him, and begging Bell to let him be hers, but he once again rejects her and cuts off her flower, concluding the War Game. Later, Freya laments at the Hostess of Fertility on her Familia's disbandment, and her confused feelings about her love. Before she can leave, she is stopped by Bell, Ryuu, and the Hostess maids, and after transforming into Syr, Ryuu berates her into taking responsibility for her actions by staying with them. Bell tells her that, while he can't be her Odr, he can at least be her knight, and Syr breaks down in tears confessing she wants to quit being a Goddess and just wants to be the girl with all of them. The Freya Familia captains observe from the rooftops, with Hedin approving, while Horn thanks Bell for saving them both.
