= Is It Wrong to Try to Pick Up Girls in a Dungeon? season 3 =

Is It Wrong to Try to Pick Up Girls in a Dungeon? III
- Season 3
- Back cover art of the first Blu-ray compilation of the third season released by Warner Bros. Home Entertainment.
- No. of episodes: 12

Release
- Original network: Tokyo MX
- Original release: October 3 – December 19, 2020

Season chronology
- ← Previous; DanMachi II Next → DanMachi IV

Is It Wrong to Try to Pick Up Girls in a Dungeon? is an anime series based on the light novel series created by Fujino Ōmori. The story follows the exploits of Bell Cranel, a 14-year-old solo adventurer under the goddess Hestia.

The anime is produced by J.C.Staff and directed by Hideki Tachibana. The season was originally scheduled to premiere in July 2020, but was delayed to October 3, 2020, due to the COVID-19 pandemic. The third season adapts volumes nine to eleven of the light novel.

The opening theme for the third season is "Over and Over" by Yuka Iguchi while the ending theme is "Evergreen" by sajou no hana.

== Episode list ==
No. overall	No. in season	Title	Directed by	Written by	Original release date
26	1	"Wiene (Dragon's Daughter)"; Transliteration: "Uīne (Ryū no Shōjo)" (Japanese: 竜の少女(ウィーネ))	Hideki Tachibana	Hideki Shirane	October 3, 2020
While exploring the 19th Floor in the Dungeon, Bell meets a young vouivre in distress who is capable of speaking, and out of pity for her, takes her home with him, despite his companions' protests. Once learning of the situation, Hestia agrees to let the girl stay with them and they name her "Wiene". Wiene then spends her days bonding with the members of the Hestia Familia while Hestia sends Welf, Mikoto, and Liliruca to gather more intel about monsters with intelligence, which brings the attention of a young elf girl from an unknown party and the Hermes Familia, who is investigating the matter by Ouranos' request.
27	2	"Monster (One Wing)"; Transliteration: "Monsutā (Kata-yoku)" (Japanese: 片翼(モンスター))	Kōhei Kuratomi	Hideki Shirane	October 10, 2020
Bell, Welf, and Lili return to the 19th Floor to investigate the place where Bell met Wiene, accompanied by Aisha Belka and Ryūu Lion. Bell and Welf encounter another monster capable of human speech, who asks them about Wiene before fleeing. Back from the Dungeon, Bell is inquired by the god Ikelos, whose Familia is also looking for Wiene in order to capture her, but Hermes appears to stop Ikelos and warn him that the other Gods suspect that his children are involved with monster trafficking. Back at the mansion, Wiene hears Lili worry that Bell and the others could be in trouble if she were found and runs away. Wiene is discovered by the citizens after revealing herself to save a child but before she is attacked, she is rescued by Lili and they reunite with the others at the old church where Hestia and Bell used to live.
28	3	"Xenos (Outliers)"; Transliteration: "Zenosu (Itanji)" (Japanese: 異端児(ゼノス))	Yoshihiro Mori	Mamoru Akinaga	October 17, 2020
Amidst the chaos caused in the city by Wiene's appearance, the Guild sends the Hestia Familia an obligatory mission to escort her to the 20th floor of the Dungeon. After sending Bell and the others to the dungeon, Hestia attends a meeting with Ouranos, who explains the situation to her. Once at the 20th floor, Bell's party is confronted by a pack of monsters using weapons, much to their surprise. Once confirming their will to protect Wiene, the monsters stop attacking and welcome them instead, introducing themselves as the Xenos, who unlike normal monsters, possess intelligence and are capable of human speech, and Ouranos reveals to Hestia that he hopes that her Familia can become a bridge between humans and them.
29	4	"Aspiration (Distant Dream)"; Transliteration: "Akogare (Tōi Yume)" (Japanese: 遠い夢(アコガレ))	Kazuma Satō	Hideki Shirane	October 24, 2020
The Xenos have a party to celebrate their new friendship with Bell and his companions, accompanied by Ouranos' subordinate, the mage Fels. The Xenos reveal that they were being secretly assisted by Ouranos, who reveals to Hestia that among the Gods, only he and Ganesha know about their existence. He also reveals that according to his assumptions, the Xenos are monsters who evolved after dying and reincarnating, just like humans. After the party, Bell and the others depart back to the surface, leaving Wiene with the Xenos for her own safety but promising to meet her again. Some time later, the Xenos relocate to another hideout when some of them, including Wiene, are ambushed by the members of the Ikelos Familia.
30	5	"Ikelos Familia (King of Atrocity)"; Transliteration: "Ikerosu Famiria (Sangeki no Ōja)" (Japanese: 惨劇の王者(イケロス・ファミリア))	Hitomi Ezoe	Ayumu Hisao	October 31, 2020
The Ikelos Familia captures Wiene and kill her companions. In retaliation, the Xenos attack and overrun the human settlement of Rivera on the 18th floor. Once learning of the situation, the Guild forbids all adventurers from entering the Dungeon and Ouranos sends the Ganesha Familia to stop the Xenos' attack, while also asking for Bell to join them, to which he accepts. The Hermes and Hestia Familias learn about Ouranos' request to Bell, and Aisha informs Ryuu about it, knowing that she worries about him. As Bell and the Ganesha Familia prepare to enter the Dungeon, Bell is worried about Wiene, unaware of her current imprisonment.
31	6	"Knossos (Man-Made Labyrinth)"; Transliteration: "Kunossosu (Jinzō Meikyū)" (Japanese: 人造迷宮(クノッソス))	Yūsuke Onoda	Ayumu Hisao	November 7, 2020
The Xenos strike down one of the members of the Ikelos Familia and learn of the entrance to their hideout. Bell encounters the lizardman Lido, and learns Wiene was captured by the poachers. Ryuu approaches Bell attempting to dissuade him, but he refuses so she gives him a pouch with some items to help him. Upon meeting Fels, Bell starts looking for a way to find the secret entrance when one of the items Ryuu gave him reacts, opening it. Meanwhile, the rest of the Hestia Familia wonders how they can help Bell when Lili deduces that Zanis of the Soma Familia may have some information about it and confronts him, while Hermes inquires Ikelos about his involvement with Evilus, a sect of rogue Gods that opposes the Guild. Both parties learn that the Ikelos Familia is led by descendants of Daedalus, a famous architect who helped with the foundation of Orario. Bell confronts the leader of the Ikelos Famila, Dix Perdix, who reveals that all of their illegal activities were only for the sake of gathering funds to continue the task forced on with a curse by his ancestor to finish the construction of Knossos, a man-made labyrinth conceived to rival the Dungeon in grandiosity. Dix uses a curse to turn the Xenos against each other, and Bell learns that the only way to stop them is by defeating him. Despite their level difference, Bell fights Dix.
32	7	"Dix Perdix (The Dreams of Beasts)"; Transliteration: "Dikkusu Perudikusu (Kemono no Yume)" (Japanese: 獣の夢(ディックス・ペルディクス))	Yoshiyuki Nogami	Hideki Shirane	November 14, 2020
The Ganesha and Hermes Familias capture the Xenos on the 18th floor, but the Xenos minotaur, Asterius, appears and defeats them, rescuing his companions. Dix uses his curses to inflict unhealable wounds on Bell, while affirming that for him, the pleasure of torturing the Xenos is way greater than the curse of Daedalus. To further provoke him, Dix removes the jewel on Wiene's forehead, unlocking her true form and she attacks Bell. Bell refuses to defend himself and manages to reason with her instead. Moved by his gesture, Lido breaks free from the curse and assists Bell in defeating Dix, removing the curse on the Xenos. Before fleeing, Dix uses hypnotism on Wiene and sends her to the surface. After Fels heals Bell, he rushes to the surface as well to stop her, reuniting with the rest of the Hestia Familia. Bell attempts to calm down Wiene again, when the Loki Familia arrives and attacks her. Despite knowing the consequences of defending a monster in public, Bell stands up to protect her.
33	8	"Bell Cranel (The Fool)"; Transliteration: "Beru Kuraneru (Gusha)" (Japanese: 愚者(ベル・クラネル))	Kazuma Satō	Ayumu Hisao	November 21, 2020
Dix attempts to escape, but is killed by Asterius. On the surface, claiming that Wiene is his prey, Bell defends her from other adventurers and chases her across the city. The Loki Familia attempt to capture the other Xenos when Asterius appears and fights them, paralyzing their bodies with his magic axe. Ais joins the battle and cuts an arm off the minotaur until the Hermes Familia uses smoke bombs to cover for Asterius and the other Xenos' escape. One of Dix's men mortally wounds Wiene, just to be later killed by Glos, and Bell restores Wiene's consciousness by returning the stone to her forehead before she dies in his arms. Moved by Bell's selfless act, Fels uses their magic to revive Wiene. After the battle, Bell is reprimanded by Eina for his reckless acts with the monster and risking the lives of the other citizens.
34	9	"Stigma (Downfall)"; Transliteration: "Sutiguma (Reiraku)" (Japanese: 零落(スティグマ))	Yoshihiro Mori	Hideki Shirane	November 28, 2020
Ikelos is banished from Orario for his involvement with the poachers, while Bell loses all respect from other adventurers and is comforted by Syr. With the Xenos still at large, the Loki Familia searches for them, intending to wipe them out, and Hermes, with the blueprints of Knossos in hand, enlists Ryuu's help in exchange for information about Evilus. Hephaistos, Miach, and Takemikazuchi learn about the situation and discuss about whether they should help the Xenos or not. Fels contacts the Hestia Familia and together, they come with a plan to escort the Xenos back to the dungeon via Knossos, but the Loki Familia knows their intentions, and develop their own strategy to stop Bell and the others from accomplishing their objective.
35	10	"Invisible (Forced Breakthrough)"; Transliteration: "Inbijiburu (Kyōkō Toppa)" (Japanese: 強行突破(インビジブル))	Yoshiyuki Nogami	Shōgo Yasukawa	December 5, 2020
Anxious since her last meeting with Bell, Eina decides to look for him, but Hermes meets her first and asks for a favor. Later at night, the Hestia Familia begins their plan to help evacuate the Xenos from the city. Bell attempts to draw the attention of the Loki Familia, who send Ais to follow him. Bell is approached by Aisha, Ryuu, and Naaza, who offer their help, and by Eina, but he leaves before she delivers him the bracelet she got from Hermes. With Naaza and Ryuu's help, Bell escapes from Ais' sight and Lili uses some magic to confuse the Loki Familia's forces. Led by Mikoto, Welf, and Fels, the Xenos begin to run towards one of the entrances to Knossos that are unguarded, but Wiene strays from the others and is found by Tiona, who is about to kill her, with Bell and Haruhime running to rescue her.
36	11	"Ultra Soul (Decisive Battle)"; Transliteration: "Urutora Sōru (Kessen)" (Japanese: 決戦(ウルトラソウル))	Katsushi Sakurabi	Shōgo Yasukawa	December 12, 2020
While running from Tiona, Wiene rescues a child from harm and Tiona decides to spare her. Bell and Haruhime reunite with Wiene, but Bete appears to stop them. Haruhime stays behind to stop him with Aisha's help. Welf and Mikoto also stay behind to hold off Gareth and defeat the enemy with help from Tsubaki of the Hephaistos Familia. Ais confronts Bell who sends Wiene to safety, but Wiene returns to help him. Ais refuses to stop attacking, despite learning that she is unlike feral monsters, until Wiene tears away her claws and wing to show that she is not a threat, convincing her to give up and letting them go. As the Xenos prepare to escape to Knossos, Hestia discovers that the book she got from Hermes with the labyrinth's blueprints was altered, and Hermes approaches the cornered Xenos to talk to them.
37	12	"Argonaut (Hero's Return)"; Transliteration: "Arugonouto (Eiyū Kaiki)" (Japanese: 英雄回帰(アルゴノゥト))	Hiroshi Nishikiori	Hideki Shirane	December 19, 2020
By Hermes' request, Gros and three other Xenos attack the population, provoking Bell so that he can slay them to restore his reputation. Gros attacks Eina but Bell appears to defend her. Realizing Hermes' plan, Hestia and the others rush to help them, but when Gros decides to fight seriously so that Bell can kill him, Bell refuses. Asterius, guided by Ottar under Freya's orders, arrives and challenges Bell, who recognizes him as the Minotaur he once fought and defeated in the Dungeon, now reincarnated as a Xenos and accepts his request for a rematch. Hestia takes advantage of the confusion to help evacuate Gros and the others and Bell fights Asterius with all his might, but ends up defeated. Asterius retreats, promising to fight Bell once again in the future and Fels heals all the Xenos before they return to the dungeon, with Asterius setting for the lower levels to train further. With the situation resolved, the Hestia Familia vows to look for a way for the humans and Xenos to co-exist in the future, and Bell reconciles with Ais, asking her to keep training him so that he can become stronger.
