= Is It Wrong to Try to Pick Up Girls in a Dungeon? season 1 =

Is It Wrong to Try to Pick Up Girls in a Dungeon?
- Season 1
- Back cover art of the first Blu-ray compilation as illustrated by Suzuhito Yasuda of the first season released by Warner Bros. Home Entertainment.
- No. of episodes: 13

Release
- Original network: Tokyo MX
- Original release: April 4 – June 27, 2015

Season chronology
- Next → DanMachi II

Is It Wrong to Try to Pick Up Girls in a Dungeon? is an anime series based on the light novel series created by Fujino Ōmori. The story follows the exploits of Bell Cranel, a 14-year-old solo adventurer under the goddess Hestia. The first season adapts volumes one to five of the light novel.

The anime is produced by J.C.Staff and directed by Yoshiki Yamakawa.

The opening theme is "Hey World" by Yuka Iguchi, and the ending theme is "Right Light Rise" by Kanon Wakeshima.

== Episode list ==
No. overall	No. in season	Title	Directed by	Written by	Original release date
1	1	"Adventurer (Bell Cranel)"; Transliteration: "Bōkensha (Beru Kuraneru)" (Japanese: 冒険者(ベル・クラネル))	Daisuke Takashima	Hideki Shirane	April 4, 2015
Gods who created the Universe descended from Heaven to live among humans on the condition they swore to never again use their godly powers. The Gods' only remaining power is the Blessing, which they grant to humans to level up their powers (similar to how characters level up in video games). These humans, known as Familia, become that God's family. Bell Cranel, the only member of the Goddess Hestia's Familia, is almost killed by a Minotaur while adventuring in the Dungeon of Orario. He is saved by Ais Wallenstein, a high-level adventurer and member of the Familia of the Goddess Loki, and falls in love with her. Hestia realizes he has gained the magical skill "Realis Phrase", which will raise his level rapidly based on the strength of his feelings as he fights, but decides to keep it secret as it makes him very valuable and other Gods may try to acquire him. The next day, after more adventuring, Bell's stats rise dramatically. Bell plans on talking to Ais, but at the local bar, he overhears her Familia talking about how he embarrassed himself fighting the Minotaur. Realizing how pathetic he must seem compared to her, he runs off and absentmindedly enters the Dungeon. To let off some steam, he desperately slays as many monsters as he can and returns to Hestia in the morning, beaten and bleeding, but victorious and inspired nonetheless.
2	2	"Monster Festival (Monsterphilia)"; Transliteration: "Kaibutsu-sai (Monsutāfiria)" (Japanese: 怪物祭(モンスターフィリア))	Toshikazu Hashimoto	Hideki Shirane	April 11, 2015
Hestia continues to keep Realis Phrase secret from Bell, passing off his improvement as the result of hard work, and announces she will be gone for several days. Hestia seeks out the God of Smiths, Hephaestus, and begs her to forge a weapon for Bell. After hours of grovelling in the Dogeza position, Hestia convinces Hephaestus to forge a weapon, on the condition Hestia pays for it no matter how many centuries it takes. Hephaestus forges an enchanted Tantō for Bell. During the "Monsterphilia" Festival, Bell is asked by the maids of the Hostess of Fertility Pub to return a purse to Syr, a waitress with a crush on him, who got so excited about the festival she forgot it. Meanwhile, an unnamed Goddess contacts Loki trying to locate someone in a Familia she intends on acquiring, the description of whom matches Bell perfectly. Hestia locates Bell and insists they go on a romantic date. The unnamed Goddess releases a captured albino gorilla monster, ordering it to capture Bell. It corners Hestia and Bell, who attacks it with his original knife only for it to shatter. Desperate to protect Hestia, he locks her on the other side of a metal gate and prepares to fight the gorilla unarmed.
3	3	"The Blade of a God (Hestia Knife)"; Transliteration: "Kamisama no Yaiba (Hesutia Naifu)" (Japanese: 神様の刃(ヘスティア・ナイフ))	Katsushi Sakurabi	Hideki Shirane	April 18, 2015
Flashbacks show how Bell decided to become an adventurer after his grandfather died, eventually arriving in Orario and meeting Hestia, becoming part of her Familia. The God Ganesha, whose arena the gorilla was freed from, orders it recaptured before it harms innocent people, even asking other Familia for help. Hestia eventually finds her way back to Bell and they flee the Gorilla together. Hestia gives Bell the Tanto, which she names the Hestia Knife, a living weapon enchanted to grow more powerful the stronger Bell becomes. As Bell holds the weapon for the first time, his stat level rises dramatically and he kills the Gorilla in a matter of seconds. His deed is witnessed by dozens of people, including Ais, who smiles before walking away. Hestia suddenly faints as the unknown Goddess watches from afar. As Hestia recovers, Bell realizes the Hestia Knife was forged by Hephaestus, meaning it was incredibly expensive and he swears to keep having faith in Hestia. Meanwhile, in the dungeon, Adventurer Ged Raish is shown mistreating a young girl named Liliruca Arde, forcing her to carry his equipment and threatening to let monsters kill her if she disappoints him.
4	4	"The Weak (Supporter)"; Transliteration: "Jakusha (Sapōtā)" (Japanese: 弱者(サポーター))	Daisuke Takashima	Ayumu Hisao	April 25, 2015
Bell decides to enter more dangerous levels of the dungeon, so his guild advisor, Eina Tulle, insists they buy him better armour. Bell becomes flustered when Eina turns up dressed for a date, as the two come across Hestia working to pay her debt to Hephaestus; Hestia shows her jealously toward Eina. Bell purchases armour made by a blacksmith he has never heard of and Eina gives him extra wrist armour. Bell saves Liliruca from Ged, but she disappears. Liliruca reappears later, revealing herself to be a shape shifter, and offers her services as a supporter, only to then steal the Hestia Knife afterwards. She attempts to sell it but finds that when separated from Bell, it becomes blunt and worthless. She is spotted carrying the knife by Ryuu Lion, a waitress from the Hostess of Fertility, causing her to run away and bump into Bell. With his knife returned and unaware Liliruca had tried to steal it, Bell splits the money they earned evenly with her, shocking her as all her previous partners had paid her almost nothing. Ais is seen in the dungeon preparing to fight a powerful monster while the unknown Goddess, revealed to be Freya, watches Bell. Hestia is devastated when she sees Bell with Liliruca.
5	5	"Magic Book (Grimoire)"; Transliteration: "Madōsho (Gurimoa)" (Japanese: 魔導書(グリモア))	Kiyoko Sayama	Ayumu Hisao	May 2, 2015
Bell offers to take Hestia to dinner. Ecstatic at the thought of going on a date with Bell, Hestia goes to a public bath and brags to the Goddess Demeter. As she arrives for their date, she finds that Demeter has spread the gossip far and wide and Bell is mobbed by multiple Goddesses eager to meet Hestia's very first "boyfriend". As a result, they spend most of the day avoiding detection. Liliruca has the money Bell gave her taken by members of her Souma Familia and becomes determined to steal Bell's knife, though she becomes even more confused as Bell continues to treat her kindly. After reading a book on magic he borrowed from Syr, Bell learns the Firebolt spell. He rushes to the Dungeon to test his new ability, but being unfamiliar with magic, he overexerts himself into unconsciousness. Ais finds him and puts his head in her lap until he wakes up. Once he does he flees, having embarrassed himself in front of her again. While looking for Liliruca, Bell refuses an offer from Ged to make a profit by stealing the money Liliruca had managed to save for herself by hiding it from the Souma Familia.
6	6	"Reason (Liliruca Arde)"; Transliteration: "Riyū (Ririruka Āde)" (Japanese: 理由(リリルカ・アーデ))	Risako Yoshida	Hideki Shirane	May 9, 2015
After her parents died, Liliruca was forced to become a supporter until she came to hate all adventurers. The Loki Familia discover that the Souma Familia have ceased worshipping their god and begun brewing a powerful wine so addictive other adventurers hand over their entire fortunes for a taste. Ais, who's grown interested in Bell, has been depressed since he ran away from her again. Eina, suspicious of Liliruca, asks Ais for a favour. In the Dungeon, Liliruca tricks Bell into fighting powerful monsters and steals his knife again. She is caught by Ged who is suddenly betrayed by the Souma Familia. Ged is killed and Liliruca is forced to surrender her bank key before being left to be killed by monster ants. Accepting her death, she's surprised when Bell suddenly appears and saves her. Liliruca cries and admits to every time she cheated or stole from him. Despite this, Bell forgives her and they form a true partnership. Meanwhile Ais, who had hidden in the thick fog to kill the monsters attacking Bell without him seeing her, is mad at herself for forgetting to apologize to him, when she finds a piece of his armour he lost during the fight.
7	7	"Sword Princess (Ais Wallenstein)"; Transliteration: "Kenki (Aizu Varenshutain)" (Japanese: 剣姫(アイズ・ヴァレンシュタイン))	Toshikazu Hashimoto	Ayumu Hisao	May 16, 2015
Lili goes to meet Hestia with Bell, where she apologizes for her actions, with Hestia reluctantly accepting and telling her to watch over Bell. They proceed to fight over him before he runs off embarrassed. Bell goes to meet up with Eina, where he finds Ais is there waiting with her, who stops him before he can run off again. Ais returns his lost arm gauntlet she found in the Dungeon and apologizes for scaring him off so many times; he in turn apologizes and thanks her for saving him all those times. Reflecting on not being strong enough to reach his goal, Ais agrees to train him to get better at combat. During their training, Bell is constantly knocked out, but continues to get up and try again. Ais asks how he is so strong, and he tells her it's because there's someone he wants to be closer to. While out getting food, they run into Hestia working, who becomes enraged seeing him with another girl. She reluctantly allows him to continue training with her. Meanwhile, Freya sends her captain, Ottar, into the Dungeon, where he tames and arms a Minotaur, before unleashing him on the upper floors.
8	8	"Wanting to Be a Hero (Argonaut)"; Transliteration: "Eiyū Ganbō (Arugonōto)" (Japanese: 英雄願望(アルゴノゥト))	Naoyuki Kon'no	Hideki Shirane	May 23, 2015
Bell discovers Ais has officially ranked up to Level 6, pushing his drive to reach her even more. While assisting Syr in chores, Ryuu tells him he should be looking to expand his party, and that going on adventures is the key to levelling up. Bell and Ais conclude their training as the Loki Familia head into the dungeon for their expedition. Exploring Floor 9 with Lili, Bell is cornered by the Minotaur, where he freezes in shock. Lili is knocked out saving him, leaving Bell forced to try and fight alone, barely managing to keep up with it. Ais and the Loki Familia show up to save him, but upset by this, Bell pushes them aside, proclaiming not wanting to be saved by her ever again. He manages to hold the minotaur back, pushing himself to his limits while Lili and the Loki Familia look on in awe. He finally defeats the Minotaur cutting it up with its own sword, and one last powerful Firebolt. With the monster defeated, Bell stands victorious and unconscious, with the Loki Familia speechless, especially after learning all his ranks are S. Shortly after, Bell awakens back at home, comforted by Hestia, reminiscing on how strong he's grown.
9	9	"Blacksmith (Welf Crozzo)"; Transliteration: "Kajishi (Verufu Kurozzo)" (Japanese: 鍛冶師(ヴェルフ・クロッゾ))	Kiyoko Sayama	Shōgo Yasukawa	May 30, 2015
Bell officially ranks up to Level 2 and develops a new skill, "Argonaut". Hestia attends a meeting with the other Gods where the adventurers are given nicknames, Bell's is chosen as "Little Rookie." Celebrating at the bar with Lili, Syr, and Ryuu, the latter reminds them that if they plan on heading to the middle floors, they need to join a party to have an easier time facing the dangers. While looking for more armor by Welf Crozzo, Bell runs into the man himself. Welf makes a deal with Bell to provide him with more armor and discounts if he can join his party. While in the Dungeon, Lili is apprehensive of Welf, especially after learning he's a Crozzo and estranged from the Hephaestus Familia. Fighting a dragon, Bell discovers that his Argonaut ability grants him a last-minute power boost in battle. Meanwhile, the Loki Familia find themselves inspired by Bell's actions, pushing them all harder to fight. Bell later learns from Hestia that Welf has the ability to make magic swords, like his descendants, but chooses not to. Welf confides in Bell that he does this because magic swords bring out the worst in people, and wants his work to stand on its own. He forges Bell's bull horn into a new knife as a thank you for being friends. Sometime later, Bell, Welf, and Lili prepare themselves to head into the dungeon's middle floors.
10	10	"Procession of Monsters (Pass Parade)"; Transliteration: "Kaibutsu Shintei (Pasu Parēdo)" (Japanese: 怪物進呈(パス・パレード))	Katsushi Sakurabi	Hideki Shirane	June 6, 2015
Hestia worries about Bell's safety as they continue to head further down into the middle floors, commenting on the frequent earthquakes there have been lately. Meanwhile, Hermes and his assistant, Asfi, start looking around town for information on Bell. Bell, Welf, and Lili find themselves cornered against a horde of rabbit monsters, when they encounter the retreating Takemikazuchi Familia. They "Pass Parade" them, escaping the room, leaving Bell and his party forced to also deal with the hell hounds preciously chasing them. They try to fight back and escape as best as they can, only for the earthquakes to occur, injuring Welf and blocking them in. With no other way out, Lili recommends heading further down to the 18th Floor's Safe Zone to rest, which Bell agrees and they push through. Hestia is approached by Takemikazuchi and his Familia who apologize for their actions, so she requests their help in rescuing Bell. Hermes also shows up, offering his and Asfi's assistance in the quest; he and Hestia also insist on joining even though Gods are forbidden from entering the Dungeon. Bell and the party struggle to keep their strength as the monsters get worse, while Hestia and her party prepare to head into the dungeon, with newfound assistance from Ryuu.
11	11	"Labyrinth Utopia (Under Resort)"; Transliteration: "Meikyū no Rakuen (Andā Rizōto)" (Japanese: 迷宮の楽園(アンダーリゾート))	Daisuke Takashima	Ayumu Hisao	June 13, 2015
Bell, Lili, and Welf continue their way further down the Dungeon, with Hestia and her party slowly following suit. Hestia confronts Hermes why he is so interested in Bell, revealing he's been assigned to watch over him by someone. Welf and Lili overexert themselves, leaving Bell left to carry them the rest of the way. He manages to barely make it past the Floor 17 Goliath boss, and arrives on the 18th floor before passing out. He wakes up in a tent beside Ais, whose Familia is revealed to have rescued and helped heal the three of them; Bell thanks them for their help, and Ais shows him around. Later that night, after everyone's recovered, they are treated to dinner as guests, when Hestia and her party finally catch up, with her and Bell reunited. Mikoto and her Familia apologize for their actions, which Bell forgives, with Welf and Lili reluctantly so. Afterwards, Ais goes to check up on Bell and tells him about the town on the floor. An eavesdropping Hestia shows up and invites herself to the visit. Meanwhile, Welf agonizes over Hephaestus's comments about re-thinking his stance on magic swords.
12	12	"Evil Intentions (Show)"; Transliteration: "Akui (Shō)" (Japanese: 悪意(ショー))	Daisuke Takashima; Kiyoko Sayama	Shōgo Yasukawa	June 20, 2015
Bell and the rest of the group visit the town of Rivira, where Bell runs afoul of a couple aggressive adventurers he had a previous encounter with. The girls decide to take a bath, while Hermes takes Bell to talk somewhere. Bell realizes Hermes brought him just to spy on the girls, and in trying to leave accidentally falls in, running off after seeing Ais naked. He inadvertently runs into Ryuu, who reveals that she is the lone survivor of a murdered familia, and was blacklisted from the Guild after avenging their deaths, before being taken in by Syr. She tells him not to try and rely on her, but Bell manages to cheer her up. The rogue adventurers, jealous of Bell's growth, plan a way to get back at him. As Ais and her Familia head back home, Hestia is kidnapped by the adventurers, leaving a letter behind for Bell to face them alone. The lead adventurer challenges Bell to a duel, where he utilizes a magic helmet to turn himself invisible to give Bell a beating; the encounter being set up by Hermes to test Bell's abilities. As Bell manages to fight back and turn the tide of the battle, the rest of the party soon show up as reinforcement, and an escaped Hestia unleashes her divine powers to scare them all away. Before they can fully recover, an "evil quake" starts to occur on the floor.
13	13	"The Story of a Familia (Familia Myth)"; Transliteration: "Kenzoku no Monogatari (Famiria Mīsu)" (Japanese: 眷族の物語(ファミリア・ミィス))	Katsushi Sakurabi; Yoshinobu Yamakawa	Hideki Shirane	June 27, 2015
An even greater version of the Goliath floor boss crashes its way onto the 18th Floor, wreaking havoc. Bell and the party go to assist and rescue the other adventurers, while Asfi recruits the locals together to team up and take the beast down. She and Ryuu work to keep the Goliath at bay, while everyone takes the time to set up and attack. Despite all the magic they throw at it, the Goliath quickly heals itself and continues destroying. Utilizing his Argonaut skill, Bell unleashes a powerful Firebolt blast, but it's not enough and the monster goes to attack him; Ouka manages to shield Bell but they're both still knocked back and unconscious. Hearing the inspiring words from Hestia, Lili, and Hermes, and wanting to prove his desire to be a hero, Bell wakes up. Ryuu, Asfi, Mikoto, and Welf, brandishing a magic sword, each pull direct hits at the monster, allowing Bell enough time to charge up and hit the final blow, nearly disintegrating it, and destroying the crystal within before it can re-heal. As everyone cheers, Hermes exclaims in excitement towards Zeus that Bell is in fact the last of his Familia (and Bell's "grandfather"), and has the potential to be the hero this world needs. Back in Orario, everyone gets together at the tavern to celebrate.
