= Is It Wrong to Try to Pick Up Girls in a Dungeon? season 4 =

Is It Wrong to Try to Pick Up Girls in a Dungeon? IV
- Season 4
- Back cover art of the first Blu-ray compilation of the fourth season released by Warner Bros. Home Entertainment
- No. of episodes: 22

Release
- Original network: Tokyo MX
- Original release: July 23, 2022 – March 18, 2023

Season chronology
- ← Previous; DanMachi III Next → Season 5

Is It Wrong to Try to Pick Up Girls in a Dungeon? is an anime series based on the light novel series created by Fujino Ōmori. The story follows the exploits of Bell Cranel, a 14-year-old solo adventurer under the goddess Hestia.

The anime is produced by J.C.Staff. The fourth season of the anime series was announced at GA FES 2021 on January 31, 2021. It features returning staff members from previous seasons, with the addition of Fujino Ōmori, the original author, who will supervise the scripts alongside Hideki Shirane. The fourth season premiered on July 22, 2022, with the first half of the season aired till September 29, 2022, and the second half (titled DanMachi IV Deep Chapter: Calamity Arc) which aired from January 7 to March 18, 2023. (Note: Episodes are released on select platforms 2 days before their original air date on television.) The fourth season adapts volumes twelve to fourteen of the light novel.

The first opening theme for the fourth season is "Tentō" (天灯; lit. 'Sky Lantern') by sajou no hana, and the first ending theme is "Guide" by Saori Hayami. The second opening theme is "Shikō" (視紅; lit. 'Red Eyes') by Saori Hayami, and the second ending theme is "Kirikizu" (切り傷; lit. 'Cut') by sajou no hana.

== Episode list ==
No. overall	No. in season	Title	Directed by	Written by	Original release date
Part 1
38	1	"Prelude (Night Before Departure)"; Transliteration: "Pureryūdo (Shuppatsu Zenya)" (Japanese: 出発前夜(プレリュード))	Hideki Tachibana, Yoshiyuki Nogami	Hideki Shirane	July 23, 2022
After recovering from his fight with Asterius, Bell learns from Hestia that he has reached Level 4 and is warned by Fels that true peace between Orario and the Xenos can be only achieved after someone conquers the bottom level of the Dungeon. The Hestia Familia is given their first mandatory assignment from the Guild, which involves exploring the lower levels, a first time for Bell and the others. Hestia decides to form an expedition team, inviting members from the Miach and Takemikazuchi Familias to help with the task. Aisha volunteers to join the expedition as well and helps with Haruhime's magic training, while Lilliluka, who is one of the weakest members, accepts Daphne's suggestion to act as a strategist for the team, leaving the fighting to the others, while Welf also creates new equipment for the whole party. After finishing their preparations, Bell and the expedition team begin their journey to the lower levels, ignoring Cassandra's suggestion to postpone their departure after having an ominous dream.
39	2	"The Great Falls (The Great Falls)"; Transliteration: "Gurēto Fōru (Kyo Ao no Taki)" (Japanese: 巨蒼の滝(グレート・フォール))	Yûsuke Onoda	Hideki Shirane	July 30, 2022
Bell and the others reach the entrance to the lower levels, where they make camp. In the occasion, they rest and check on their equipment. The next day, they enter the 25th floor where they keep fighting monsters and collecting materials until they spot Luvis, a wounded elf adventurer who is attacked by a huge plant-like monster. Bell fights the monster, who responds with a barrage of projectiles that the party avoids by the adventurer's warning, except for Chigusa, who is hit with one of them. The monster retreats, and some vines begin to grow from Luvis and Chigusa's wounds, threatening their lives and leaving Cassandra in shock, as the events so far transpired according to her dream.
40	3	"Parasite (Viscum Album)"; Transliteration: "Yadorigi (Kisei)" (Japanese: 寄生(ヤドリギ))	Yoshihiro Mori	Hideki Shirane	August 6, 2022
Unable to extract the Vines from Luvis and Chigusa, the party discovers that the monster is an irregular type of monster called a "Moss Huge" who evolved after eating the magic stones from other monsters and is attacking adventurers to steal those in their possession. Luvis had taken his magic stones to act as a diversion for his companions to escape, unaware that the monster captured them. Concluding that they must defeat the monster to save their companions, Bell and the others look for the Moss Huge, but fall in the trap when the monster uses the corpse of one of Luvis' friends as a decoy. Their fight ends with the Moss Huge escaping and throwing Bell into the waterfalls. Unable to look for Bell in their current condition, the group retreats to the entrance of the floor to set a trap for the Moss Huge, while Bell, who survived the fall, meets a mermaid.
41	4	"Mermaid (The Girl of Water City)"; Transliteration: "Māmeido (Mizu To no Shōjo)" (Japanese: 水都の少女(マーメイド))	Yoshiyuki Nogami	Hideki Shirane	August 13, 2022
Bell learns that the mermaid is a Xenos called Marie who is a friend of the other Xenos that he previously met. Despite Marie's warnings, Bell convinces her to guide him back so that he can rejoin the others and fight the Moss Huge. Meanwhile, Bell's party is ambushed by an stampede of monsters created by the Moss Huge. They fight for their lives while protecting the other wounded adventurers, but running out of options, they decide to unleash their trump card by having Haruhime cast her new magic spell, "Kokonoe".
42	5	"Argo Vesta (Heroic Slash of Holy Flame)"; Transliteration: "Arugo Wesuta (Seika no Eiki)" (Japanese: 聖火の英斬(アルゴ・ウェスタ))	Shigeru Ueda	Hideki Shirane	August 20, 2022
Empowered by Haruhime's spell, Bell's party fights back the monster horde, until they realize that the Moss Huge's objective was to absorb the magic stones of the monsters they defeated, becoming much stronger. Overpowered by the Moss Huge, the other adventurers decide to sacrifice themselves to allow Lili and the others to escape, but she refuses. Bell rejoins them and fights the Moss Huge alone. Having finally adjusted to his newfound strength in the lower floors, Bell combines Hestia's Knife with his Firebolt and Argonaut spells, creating his new special move "Argo Vesta" that he uses to destroy the Moss Huge with ease, dispelling the vines from the injured. Marie thanks Bell for his help, leaving in secret while he celebrates with his friends.
43	6	"Rabbit's Foot (Rabbit's Foot)"; Transliteration: "Rabitto Futto (Hakuto no Ashi)" (Japanese: 白兎の脚(ラビット・フット))	Kazuma Satō	Hideki Shirane	August 27, 2022
The Gods hold a 'Denatus', a traditional meeting where they decide on adventurers' aliases. Hestia becomes upset by the interest the other gods take in Bell, who gets the alias 'Rabbit Foot'. Meanwhile, Bell and the others rest in the Dungeon's middle-level safe zone in Rivira. In the morning, Lili asks him for some time alone to talk, but other people keep monopolizing him throughout the day. She finally manages to spend some time alone with him late in the evening. The next morning, they learn that a trader was murdered on the town's outskirts and Ryū is the main suspect.
44	7	"Cassandra Ilion (Dream Seer)"; Transliteration: "Kasandora Irion (Yochi Yume)" (Japanese: 予知夢(カサンドラ・イリオン))	Miyuki Ishida, Kouzou Kaihou	Shogo Yasukawa	September 3, 2022
Cassandra has a disturbing premonitory dream. Turk, a witness from the attack, identifies the culprit of the previous night's murder as Ryū, a waitress at the pub 'Hostess of Fertility' in Orario and a former adventurer of the Astraea Familia, known as the 'Gale Wind'. A hunting party is formed and Bell and his group decide to join, planning to help Ryū as they doubt she is the murderer. Since nobody believes in Cassandra's foresight, she does her best to keep people in her vision safe, resulting in Bell being the only one of their group following the hunting party to the 27th floor.
45	8	"Mirabilis (Chaos)"; Transliteration: "Mirabirisu (Konmei)" (Japanese: 混迷(ミラビリス))	Yûsuke Onoda	Miya Asakawa	September 10, 2022
On the Dungeon's 27th floor, Bell and the party led by Bors come upon an ominous sight but continue the hunt for Ryū in spite of the danger. Lili shares with Welf information about the murder victim she heard from Turk, who leaves to explore the 25th floor against Bors orders, so they follow him. Bell leaves the hunting party and runs into Marie again. He has a disturbing encounter with Ryū, who demands him to leave before rushing off, and later rejoins Bors party at the scene of a massacre. The only survivor named Jura Halmar, who is recognized as being a member of Evilus, sheds some light on Ryū's motivations, who suddenly appears and attacks.
46	9	"Lambton (Ill Omen)"; Transliteration: "Ramuton (Kyōchō)" (Japanese: 凶兆(ラムトン))	Yoshihiro Mori	Miya Asakawa	September 17, 2022
Jura flees but is found by Bell and Ryū. After a tense exchange, Bell is able to get Ryū to reveal she is innocent in killing the trader, and confronts Jura who shows his true colours. In Orario, Fels reports to Ouranos evidence of monster experimentation by remnants of the Evilus group. On the 25th floor, Bell's team is attacked by a Lambton, a giant snake monster from the lower levels, controlled by Turk. Meanwhile, Jura, who is a monster tamer, also sets a Lambton against Bell and Ryū and reveals all his planning to taunt them. While Bell and his allies battle the Lambtons, Turk sets in motion Jura's plan, thus bringing about Cassandra's ill premonition, which causes Ryū to hyperventilate in fear, realizing what is happening.
47	10	"Juggernaut (The Destroyer)"; Transliteration: "Jagānōto (Hakaisha)" (Japanese: 破壊者(ジャガーノート))	Shigeru Ueda	Shogo Yasukawa	September 24, 2022
On the 25th floor of the Dungeon, a monster appears and goes on a rampage, massacring everyone. Jura brags about how five years ago, his Familia, the Rudra Familia, set a trap to eliminate the Astrea Familia, Ryū's former Familia. However, the damage they caused triggered the Dungeon to spawn the same overpowerful monster, named the Juggernaut. Taunting Bell and Ryū, Jura explains how he planned it all to make Juggernaut appear again in order to tame it. Meanwhile, Lili wants to go help Bell but Cassandra falls into a fit of despair. On the 27th floor, Bors' party is being pursued and slaughtered by Juggernaut when they arrive to Jura's location. Bell attacks the monster but his arm is sliced off and he is gruesomely wounded.
48	11	"Endless (Brutal)"; Transliteration: "Endoresu (Kakoku)" (Japanese: 過酷(エンドレス))	Kazuma Satō, Tetsuro Tanaka	Shogo Yasukawa	October 1, 2022
Ryū runs to Bell's aid and then fights the Juggernaut, but she is defeated. The monster then attacks Bors' party, killing all save for Bors who manages to escape thanks to Ryū. Bell falls in the water where he is found by Marie who reattaches his arm and heals him with her blood. He resurfaces to fight the Juggernaut again, realizing it is fundamentally different from other Dungeon monsters. Jura uses a device to take control of the Juggernaut, but is immediately killed upon doing so. The Lambton reappears and swallows Ryū and Bell, causing the Juggernaut to follow in pursuit. The Dungeon falls in disarray, forcing Bell's party on the 25th floor to flee, bringing them face to face with the Floor Boss from the 27th floor, which has re-spawned at the wrong time. Meanwhile, Bell and Ryū manage to escape from Lambton's stomach, just to realize it has brought down them to the 37th floor, known as the infamous "White Palace".
Part 2
49	12	"Amphisbaena (A Song of Despair)"; Transliteration: "Anfisubaena (Zetsubō no Uta)" (Japanese: 絶望の詩(アンフィス・バエナ))	Miyuki Ishida, Tetsuro Tanaka	Hideki Shirane	January 7, 2023
50	13	"Morgue (Victim)"; Transliteration: "Morugu (Gisei)" (Japanese: 犠牲(モルグ))	Akira Tanaka	Miya Asakawa	January 14, 2023
51	14	"Daphne Lauros (Friend)"; Transliteration: "Dafune Raurosu (Tomo)" (Japanese: 友(ダフネ・ラウロス))	Yoshiyuki Nogami	Masato Hori	January 21, 2023
52	15	"Ignis (Flame)"; Transliteration: "Igunisu (Furei)" (Japanese: 不冷(イグニス))	Mitsuo Hashimoto	Shogo Yasukawa	January 28, 2023
53	16	"Welf Crozzo (Shikou)"; Transliteration: "Werufu Kurozzo (Shikō)" (Japanese: 始高(ヴェルフ・クロッゾ))	Yoshihiro Mori	Hideki Shirane	February 4, 2023
54	17	"White Palace (White Labyrinth)"; Transliteration: "Howaito Paresu (Shiro no Meikyū)" (Japanese: 白の迷宮(ホワイトパレス))	Yūsuke Onoda	Miya Asakawa	February 11, 2023
55	18	"Desperate (Dungeon Do-or-Die Time)"; Transliteration: "Desuparēto (Meikyū Kesshi Kudari)" (Japanese: 迷宮決死行(デスパレート))	Katsushi Sakurabi	Masato Hori	February 18, 2023
56	19	"Colosseum (Combat Arena)"; Transliteration: "Koroshiamu (Sentō Arīna)" (Japanese: 戦闘アリーナ(コロシアム))	Shigeru Ueda	Miya Asakawa	February 25, 2023
57	20	"Astrea Familia (Heroic Death)"; Transliteration: "Asutorea Famirī (Eiyū-teki Shi)" (Japanese: 英雄的死(アストレアファミリー))	Hideki Tachibana	Hideki Shirane	March 4, 2023
58	21	"Daydream (A Sweet Lie)"; Transliteration: "Deidorīmu (Yasashī Uso)" (Japanese: 優しい嘘(デイドリーム))	Kazuma Satō	Shōgo Yasukawa	March 11, 2023
59	22	"Luvia (Starry Flower)"; Transliteration: "Ruvia (Hoshi Hana)" (Japanese: 星華(ルヴィア))	Shigeru Ueda	Hideki Shirane	March 18, 2023

== Recap special ==
No. overall	No. in season	Title	Original release date
37.5	0	"Play Back (Reminisce)"; Transliteration: "Purei Bakku (Kaiko)" (Japanese: 回顧(プレイバック))	July 9, 2022
A recap special of seasons 1–3 (episodes 1–37) and a preview of season 4.
