= Is It Wrong to Try to Pick Up Girls in a Dungeon? season 2 =

Is It Wrong to Try to Pick Up Girls in a Dungeon? II
- Season 2
- Back cover art of the first Blu-ray compilation of the second season released by Warner Bros. Home Entertainment.
- No. of episodes: 12

Release
- Original network: Tokyo MX
- Original release: July 13 – September 28, 2019

Season chronology
- ← Previous; DanMachi Next → DanMachi III

Is It Wrong to Try to Pick Up Girls in a Dungeon? is an anime series based on the light novel series created by Fujino Ōmori. The story follows the exploits of Bell Cranel, a 14-year-old solo adventurer under the goddess Hestia.

The anime is produced by J.C.Staff and directed by Hideki Tachibana. The second season adapts volumes six to eight of the light novel.

The opening theme for the second season is "Hello to Dream" by Yuka Iguchi, and the ending theme is "Sasayakana Shukusai" (ささやかな祝祭; lit. 'Small Festival') by Sora tob sakana.

== Episode list ==
No. overall (Note: The story takes place after the events of the film, Arrow of the Orion.)	No. in season	Title	Directed by	Written by	Original release date
14	1	"Banquet of the Gods (Party)"; Transliteration: "Kami no utage (Pātī)" (Japanese: 神の宴(パーティー))	Hideki Tachibana	Hideki Shirane	July 13, 2019
Celebrating at the tavern after a day of dungeon crawling, Bell and his party get into a scuffle with the Apollo Familia, leaving them brutally beaten down. The next day, Bell and Hestia are invited to a party at Apollo's; Hestia believes something is up but reluctantly goes. At the event, the two meet up with several of their friends, with Bell encountering a dressed up Ais and being formally introduced to Freya. Later during the night, Hermes helps Bell get a dance with Ais. After this, Apollo uses the opportunity to confront Bell and Hestia, claiming they intentionally attacked his Familia, and in retaliation, challenges them to a War Game, with the plan of winning Bell for himself.
15	2	"Sun God (Apollo)"; Transliteration: "Taiyō-shin (Aporon)" (Japanese: 太陽神(アポロン))	Kōzō Kaihō	Hideki Shirane	July 20, 2019
Hestia refuses the War Game proposal, and she and Bell leave the party. The next day, their home is completely surrounded and destroyed by the Apollo Familia, forcing them to flee. They try to make it to the Guild Headquarters but are constantly cut off by their attackers. Welf, Lili, the Takemikazuchi, and Miach Familias show up to try and aid them. During the fight, Lili is confronted by Zanis Lustra, the captain of the Soma Familia, and she's forced to go back with them to get them to stop fighting. Realizing they have no way of escape, Hestia and Bell head to Apollo's mansion directly to accept his challenge. Seeking assistance from Ais, she and Tiona agree to secretly help train him until the Games, while Hestia heads up a plan to rescue Lili.
16	3	"Gathering (Conversion)"; Transliteration: "Shūketsu (Konbājon)" (Japanese: 集結(コンバージョン))	Toshikazu Hashimoto	Hideki Shirane	July 27, 2019
Lili is locked up in a Soma Familia jail cell by Zanis, who after discovering about her transformation magic, wants to utilize it for more money-making schemes; he keeps her there until she agrees to help. At a discussion amongst the Gods to determine the fate of the War Game, it's declared that if Apollo wins, he gets Bell, and if Hestia wins, he'll give her anything she wants. A draw decides the battle will be a castle siege, with Hestia Familia as the offensive team, and partially thanks to Freya's goading, Apollo allows Hestia to have one helper, as long as they're from an out of town family. Bell continues to spend the next few days training alongside Ais and Tiona. Hestia and the crew storm the Soma Familia in their effort to rescue Lili. Free, thanks to one of the guards, Lili pleads to Soma directly to stop the fighting. After being able to hold out against his divine wine, he agrees, stopping the fighting and arresting Zanis. He frees her from his Familia, allowing her to join Hestia's. Welf and Mikoto also ask their respective Gods to be let free so they can assist Bell in the War Game as part of the Hestia Familia. Ryuu agrees to be their outside helper.
17	4	"War Game (War Game)"; Transliteration: "Sensō yūgi (Wō Gēmu)" (Japanese: 戦争遊戯(ウォーゲーム))	Katsushi Sakurabi	Shōgo Yasukawa	August 3, 2019
After making their preparations, the War Game starts. The Hestia Familia must conquer the headquarters of the Apollo Familia, that's 100 men strong. All Gods and Goddesses watch the game from their hall, while Hermes' power transmits it to everybody in town. Thanks to Lili sneaking in with her transformation magic, spreading discord amongst the Familia, Ryuu and Mikoto's magic holding off most of the outer enemies, and Welf's magic swords busting down most of the castle, Bell is able to face directly against the captain, Hyakinthos Cilo. Using the training he received from Ais, as well as some assistance from a good luck charm received from Syr, Bell manages to strike him down, winning the War Game. In response to this, Hestia claims all of Apollo's possessions for herself, forces him to dissolve his Familia, and exiles him from Orario.
18	5	"The Hearthfire Mansion (Home)"; Transliteration: "Kamadobi no yakata (Hōmu)" (Japanese: 竈火の館(ホーム))	Yoshihiro Mori	Mamoru Akinaga	August 10, 2019
After their victory in the War Game, the Hestia Familia moves into Apollo's former mansion and refits it according to their needs, spending all the money she took from Apollo. With all their current fame and success, Hestia decides to start hiring new members, leading adventurers from all over the country showing up to potentially join. This backfires when Mikoto accidentally stumbles across Hestia's old 200 million valis debt to Hephaestus for the Hestia Knife, scaring off everyone. Bell is shocked by this, unaware of how expensive it really was. Hestia apologizes for keeping it a secret, and the Familia pledge to assist in clearing the debt. Later that night, Chigusa comes to the mansion with bad news for Mikoto.
19	6	"City of Lust (Ishtar Familia)"; Transliteration: "Injato (Ishutaru Famiria)" (Japanese: 淫都(イシュタル・ファミリア))	Hideki Tachibana	Hideki Shirane	August 17, 2019
Bell, Lili, and Welf follow Mikoto all the way to Orario's red-light district which is under control by the Ishtar Familia. While Lili and Welf learn that they are searching for an old friend of theirs, Bell gets separated and targeted by some of the Amazon women from the Ishtar Familia. He manages to escape and hides in the room of Haruhime, a fox-human girl. Spending the rest of the night together, they both regale their love for classic fairy tales and stories about heroes, although Haruhime feels unworthy of being one of the damsels due to being a prostitute. The following morning, she helps Bell get back home, and Bell wonders if there's anything he can do to help. Meanwhile, Goddess Ishtar learns from Hermes, whom Bell at met earlier that night, that Freya has her eyes on him, and intends to use that against her.
20	7	"Fox Person (Renard)"; Transliteration: "Kitsunejin (Runāru)" (Japanese: 狐人(ルナール))	Kōzō Kaihō	Shōgo Yasukawa	August 24, 2019
Returning back to their place, Bell learns that Mikoto's missing friend is none other than Haruhime, and they try to find someway to help her out. Not wanting to risk another war amongst Familias, the party decide to try and save enough money so they can buy her freedom. Hermes, after learning about this, lets Bell and Mikoto know he was delivering a "Killing Stone" to Ishtar, to hopefully push them in the right direction. At this same time, however, Ishtar sends her Familia after them into the Dungeon, where they proceed to ambush Bell.
21	8	"Killing Stone (Ephemeral Dreams)"; Transliteration: "Sesshōseki (Uta Katano Yume)" (Japanese: 殺生石(ウタカタノユメ))	Toshikazu Hashimoto	Mamoru Akinaga	August 31, 2019
Bell and Mikoto are incapacitated by a powered up Aisha and taken to the castle. Bell awakens inside of Phryne's dungeon, who plans to devour him for herself. Haruhime gives Mikoto the cell keys, and helps Bell escape. Over this course of time, Bell, Mikoto, and the rest of the Hestia Familia learn that Ishtar plans to use the Killing Stone to seal away Haruhime's soul, and utilize her level boosting power so that they may take down Freya Familia. Aisha takes Haruhime back and taunts Bell and Mikoto for not doing more to help; they're forced to run and flee.
22	9	"War Prostitutes (Berbera)"; Transliteration: "Sentō shōfu (Bābera)" (Japanese: 戦闘娼婦(バーベラ))	Yūsuke Onoda	Hideki Shirane	September 7, 2019
The Hestia and Takemikazuchi Familias try to break into the Pleasure Quarter, while the Ishtar Familia plan to start the ritual. Bell and Mikoto decide to risk whatever they can and go to save Haruhime; Bell attacks the castle as a distraction while Mikoto goes to find where Haruhime is. Bell encounters Ishtar, who tells him about her plan to stop Freya. She tries to charm him, only to be stunned to realize he's immune, discovering his "Realis Phrase" ability. Meanwhile, the Freya Familia keep watch outside the city. Mikoto faces off against Samira before the ritual happens, using her magic to take out many of the members, at the cost of her own strength, falling off the castle. Bell runs in and destroys the Killing Stone before they have the chance to kill Haruhime.
23	10	"Longing to Be a Hero (Argonaut)"; Transliteration: "Eiyū setsubō (Arugonouto)" (Japanese: 英雄切望(アルゴノゥト))	Katsushi Sakurabi	Shōgo Yasukawa	September 14, 2019
Ishtar discovers the Pleasure Quarter under attack by the Freya Familia, with Freya herself at the forefront. Despite Haruhime's initial protests, Bell finally manages to get through to her, as she asks for his help. Powered up with her magic, Bell faces off against Phryne, where she ends up falling through the wreckage of the castle. Before he can save Haruhime, Aisha steps in and forces him to fight her first. Meanwhile, Ottar heals a wounded Mikoto, and the Hestia and Takemikazuchi Familias make their way through the castle towards Bell. Ottar takes out Phryne, while Freya corners an escaping Ishtar. Hermes watches as all the destruction goes down, once again proclaiming that Bell will be "the last hero". Using his Argonaut ability, Bell manages to push through and defeats Aisha. With nowhere to run, Ishtar tells Freya about Bell's secret, with her saying it just makes her want him more. Freya proceeds to slap Ishtar, knocking her off the tower, killing her as she is sent back to heaven. Bell looks on at Freya, secretly saying something to him, before she disappears. Haruhime wakes up and thanks him for saving her, as the rest of the Familias reunite together.
24	11	"Army's Advance (Rakia)"; Transliteration: "Shingun (Rakia)" (Japanese: 進軍(ラキア))	Yoshihiro Mori	Mamoru Akinaga	September 21, 2019
The armies of Rakia, and Familia of the God Ares, try attacking Orario, but are no match for the adventurers keeping guard, particularly the Loki Familia. Hermes tells Bell about the "Three Great Quests" assigned to the people of the world, and that there is one that remains, the slaying of the Black Dragon, which had already taken down the might of the Zeus and Hera Familias. He says the one to accomplish this quest will be the true hero. Haruhime is also welcomed into the Hestia Familia, however jealously over her and Bell's closeness leads Hestia to start putting up some boundaries. After Bell rebukes a slight confession from Hestia, she runs off depressed, leading Bell to chase after her. He has a conversation with Miach and Takemikazuchi to try and figure out how he should handle their feelings. Meanwhile, Ares, in a bid to gain some leverage in the battle, sneaks into Orario to kidnap a God; he inadvertently stumbles upon Hestia and quickly snatches her. Ais, followed by Bell and Asfi, go after them to rescue her. During the fight, Bell and Hestia are knocked off a cliff, leaving Ais to jump down after them.
25	12	"Goddess and Child (Song of Love)"; Transliteration: "Megami to kenzoku (Ai no uta)" (Japanese: 女神と眷族(アイノウタ))	Kōzō Kaihō	Hideki Shirane	September 28, 2019
Bell, Hestia, and Ais take shelter in a nearby village, where Hestia is still recuperating. They are welcomed by the Mayor, who reveals that he was once an adventurer in love with a Goddess he was sworn to protect, who died saving him. Bell and Ais help out around the town, in preparation for an upcoming festival, where they learn the town is protected by the scales of the Black Dragon which repel other monsters; Ais reacts to the scales with frustration. That night at the festival, Hestia asks Bell for her hand in dance, when later they learn the mayor is soon about to die. Right as he passes, Hestia uses her power to allow him to see his Goddess one last time. After paying their respects, Hestia reaffirms Bell that she will always be there for him, even in another life; the three then reunite with Asfi and return to Orario. Meanwhile, a mysterious monster girl awakens within the Dungeon.

== Recap special ==
No. overall	No. in season	Title	Original release date
13.5	0	"Past & Future"; Transliteration: "Kako to Mirai" (Japanese: 過去(パスト)と(&)未来(フューチャー))	July 6, 2019
A recap special of the first season.
