= Luci Christian =

American voice actress

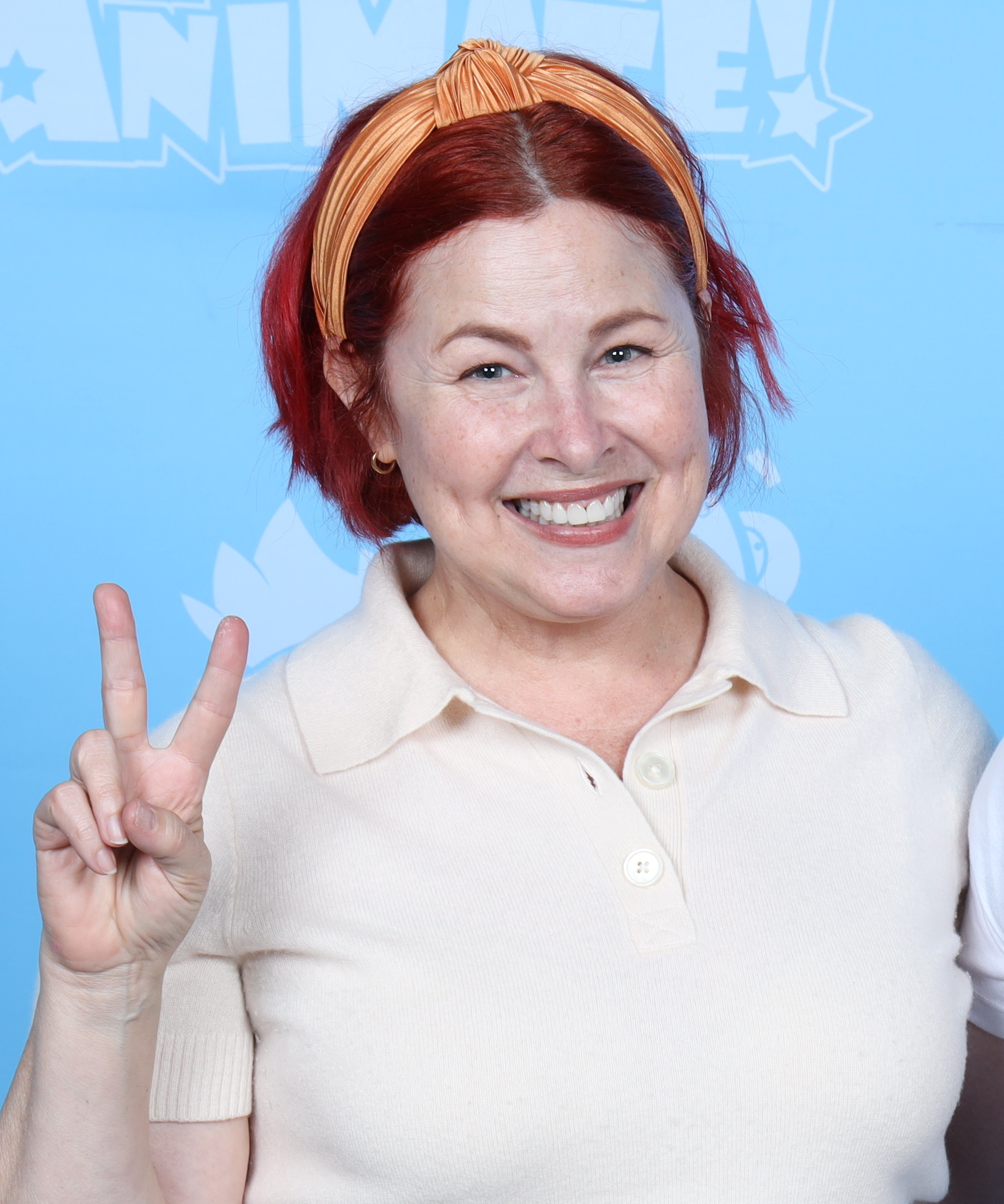
- Christian at Animate! Columbus in 2024
- Born: Louisa Michelle Christian; March 18, 1973 (age 53); Hamilton, Texas, U.S.
- Education: Angelo State University (B.A.); Louisiana State University (M.F.A.)
- Occupations: Voice actress; ADR script writer
- Years active: 1999–present
- Notable work: My Hero Academia as Ochaco Uraraka; Princess Tutu as Duck/Princess Tutu; Soul Eater as Medusa Gorgon; Is It Wrong to Try to Pick Up Girls in a Dungeon? as Hestia; One Piece as Nami; Bloom Into You as Touko Nanami; Ouran High School Host Club as Honey; Full Metal Panic! as Kaname Chidori; Food Wars!: Shokugeki no Soma as Yuki Yoshino; Made in Abyss as Reg; Fruits Basket as Hiro Soma; Fullmetal Alchemist as Wrath; Blade Runner Black Out 2022 as Trixie
- Spouse: Michael Bell (m. 2008)
- Children: 2
- Relatives: Kevin Christian (brother)
- Website: lucichristian.com

Louisa Michelle "Luci" Christian (born March 18, 1973) is an American voice actress and ADR script writer. She has provided many voices for English versions of Japanese anime series and films.

== Life and career ==
Christian grew up in Texas, where her parents, Mike and Barbara, were high school teachers. From age 3 to 9, she participated in some local beauty pageants, and later got involved in theater programs in high school. In college, she originally pursued journalism, but changed to theatre when she was offered a scholarship. She got her bachelor's degree in Theatre from Angelo State University in San Angelo, Texas, and her Master of Fine Arts in Theatre at the Louisiana State University in Baton Rouge, Louisiana.

Her involvement in anime starts in ADV Films in Houston where she had some bit parts in Those Who Hunt Elves that involved about three hours of studio time. She did not hear back for some time until she got cast in Neo Ranga. A few weeks later, she auditioned and got her first starring role as Kaname Chidori in Full Metal Panic!. In Super Gals! Ran Kotobuki, she voices the title character who is a fun-loving teenage gal in a family of police officers. In Prétear, she voices main character Himeno Awayuki, a teenage girl who ends up living with two stepsisters and becomes involved in a magical girl fantasy. She also voiced teacher Yukari Tanizaki in the school life comedy Azumanga Daioh. In 2006, she was featured in a series of articles by IGN titled "Babes of ADV Voice-Over".

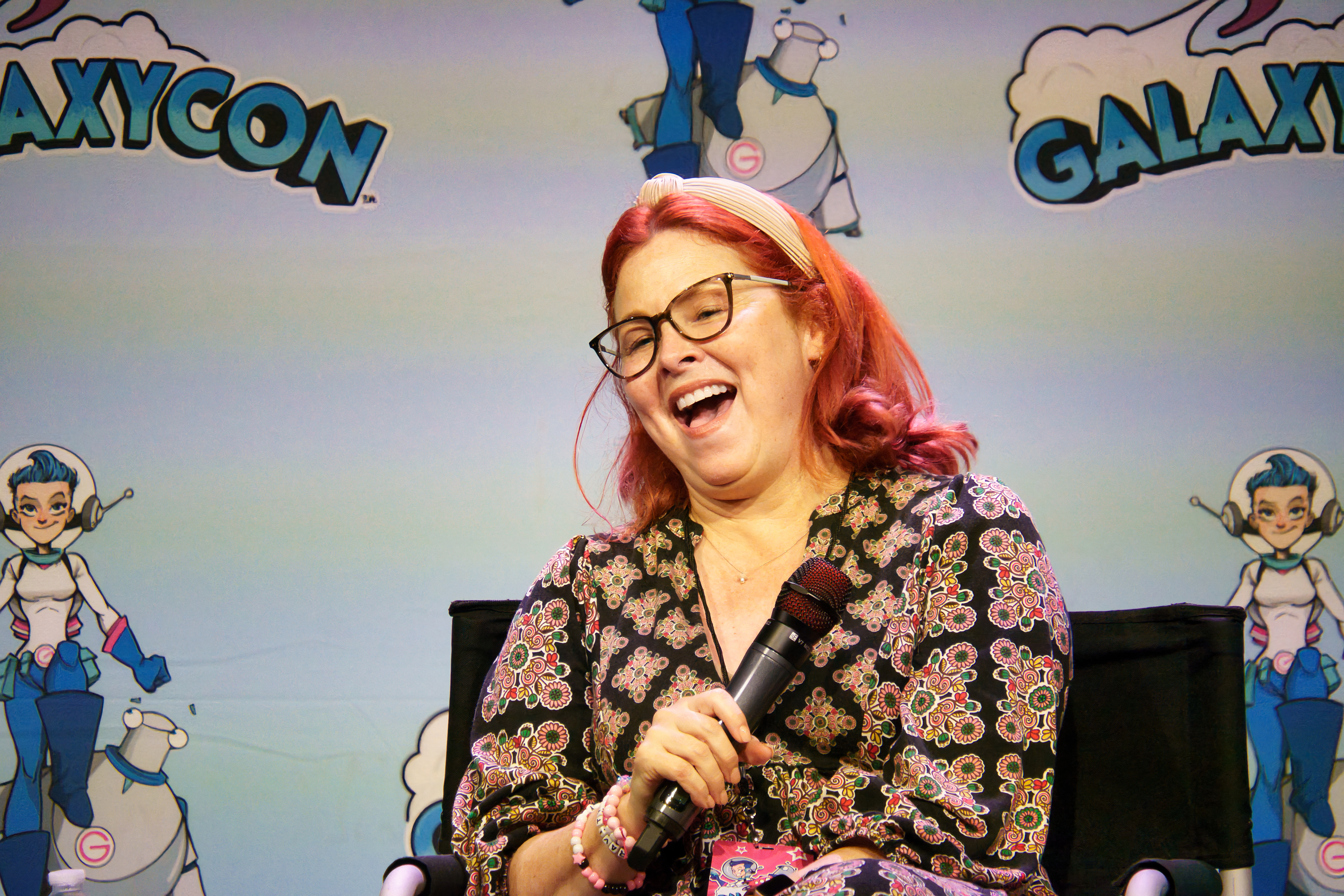
Luci Christian Galaxy Con Raleigh in 2023

Christian joined the voice actors who would regularly travel from Houston to record with Funimation in Dallas. She had supporting roles in Fullmetal Alchemist as guest character Psiren and later as the recurring character Wrath. She voiced actress Asako Kurumi in Funimation's dub of Kodocha, and a lead role as Rico in the girls-with-guns drama Gunslinger Girl. In 2006, she voiced lead character Asuna Kagurazaka in the school anime Negima, which is about a boy magician who teaches at an all-girls middle school. Theron Martin of Anime News Network remarked that she interpreted her role much like Kaname Chidori on Full Metal Panic. She also landed the lead role of Tenma Tsukamoto in the comedy School Rumble, voiced the supporting role of Hitomi Kashiwa in Welcome to the NHK, and voiced the youthful-looking Mitsukuni "Honey" Haninozuka in Ouran High School Host Club. After Funimation acquired the dubbing rights for the long-running One Piece anime series, Christian was selected to play its lead female navigator Nami.

In 2007, the American Anime Awards nominated her for Best Actress for her work in Princess Tutu as the lead role of Ahiru, and Best Actress in a Comedy for her work in Desert Punk, Negima and Nerima Daikon Brothers, but lost to Mary Elizabeth McGlynn and Debi Derryberry, respectively.

In 2009, she voiced Kirino Chiba, the captain of a kendo team in Bamboo Blade and Lenalee Lee in the fantasy series D.Gray-man. In 2010, she voiced as Nagisa Furukawa in the Clannad series, the title character in Birdy the Mighty Decode and Makina Hoshimura from Corpse Princess. She voiced Medusa in the Soul Eater anime series, which was released on video in 2010 and later broadcast on Adult Swim's Toonami block in 2013. In 2011, she voiced Meryl Strife in the English dub of anime feature film Trigun: Badlands Rumble. In 2012, she voiced Nessa in Fractale, served as the narrator for Ōkami-san and her Seven Companions and Kamisama Kiss, and voiced companion devil Elsie in The World God Only Knows. In 2013, she voiced main characters Marika Kato in Bodacious Space Pirates, and Himeko Inaba in the body-swapping anime series Kokoro Connect. In 2016, she voiced Ochaco Uraraka in My Hero Academia. Christian voiced Chihaya Ayase in Sentai Filmworks' English dub of the adaptation of Yuki Suetsugu's manga series Chihayafuru. Also in 2017, she had starring heroine roles as Hestia in Is It Wrong to Try to Pick Up Girls in a Dungeon? and Touko Nanami in Bloom Into You.

== Personal life ==
Christian is married to Michael Bell. They have two daughters. She has a brother, Kevin Christian, who ran for a seat in the Texas Legislature in 2006. She currently lives in Houston, Texas.

== Filmography ==
=== Anime ===
List of English dubbing performances in anime
Year	Title	Role	Notes	Source
1998	Those Who Hunt Elves	Colleena		
2003	Neo Ranga	Takako Kedoin, Tokimi		
2003-2005	Mermaid Melody Pichi Pichi Pitch	Lucia Nanami		
2003–2005, 2018	Full Metal Panic! series	Kaname Chidori	Also Fumoffu, The Second Raid, and Invisible Victory	
2003	Super Gals	Ran Kotobuki		
2003	Pretear	Himeno Awayuki		
2004	Azumanga Daioh	Yukari Tanizaki		
2004	Fullmetal Alchemist	Wrath, Psiren		
2004	Tactics	Yoko		
2005	Xenosaga: The Animation	KOS-MOS	10 episodes	[imdb]
2005	Princess Tutu	Duck / Princess Tutu	2 seasons	
2005	Elfen Lied	Mariko Kurama		
2005	Kodocha	Asako Kurumi		
2005	Ghost Stories	Misono, Shizuko, Nancee Grayce	ADV dub	
2005–2007	Gunslinger Girl	Rico	2 seasons	
2006–2008	Negima! Magister Negi Magi series	Asuna Kagurazaka	Also Negima?! and OVAs	
2006	Black Cat	Young Train		
2007	Air	Haruko Kamio	Funimation dub	
2007–2008	School Rumble series	Tenma Tsukamoto	Also season 2 and OVAs	
2007	Welcome to the NHK	Hitomi Kashiwa		
2007–present	One Piece	Nami	Funimation dub	
2008	Ouran High School Host Club	Mitsukuni "Honey" Haninozuka		
2009	Bamboo Blade	Kirino Chiba		
2009–2010, 2016–2018	D.Gray-man series	Lenalee Lee	Also Hallow in 2018	
2009–2011	Fullmetal Alchemist: Brotherhood	Truth		
2010	Soul Eater	Medusa Gorgon		
2010–2011	Clannad series	Nagisa Furukawa, Ushio Okazaki	Also After Story and movie	
2010	Birdy the Mighty: Decode	Birdy	2 seasons, ADV dub	
2010	Corpse Princess	Makina Hoshimura		
2012–2015	The World God Only Knows series	Elsie	3 seasons + OVAs	
2012	Black Butler II	Alois Trancy		
2012	Ōkami-san and her Seven Companions	Narrator		
2012	Infinite Stratos series	Chifuyu Orimura, Madoka Orimura, Ran Gotanda	2 seasons + OVAs	
2012	The Legend of the Legendary Heroes	Ferris Eris	Also OVA	
2012	Cat Planet Cuties	Antonia Morfenoss	Sentai dub	
2012	Fractale	Nessa		
2013	Bodacious Space Pirates	Marika Kato	Also film	
2013–2015	A Certain Scientific Railgun series	Banri Edasaki	2 seasons	
2013	Appleseed XIII OVAs	Deunan Knute	Also Tartaros and Ouranos	
2013	AKB0048	Nagisa Motomiya		
2013	Campione!	Shizuka Kusanagi		
2013	Kokoro Connect	Himeko Inaba		
2014	Kill Me Baby	Sonya		
2014	Kamisama Kiss	Narrator		
2014	Problem Children Are Coming from Another World, Aren't They?	Shiroyasha		
2014	Gatchaman Crowds	PAI-Man		
2014	Black Bullet	Enju Aihara		
2014	Log Horizon	Minori		
2014	The Ambition of Oda Nobuna	Himiko, Narrator		
2014	Rozen Maiden: Zurückspulen	Shinku		
2014	Diabolik Lovers	Beatrix/Laito (young)		
2015	Dog & Scissors	Hami/Sarai		
2015	Maid Sama!	Aoi Hyoudou		
2015	Beyond the Boundary	Yayoi Kanbara		
2015	Parasyte	Satomi Murano		
2015–2016	Chaika – The Coffin Princess	Vivi Holopainen	2 seasons	
2016	Hanayamata	Hana N. Fountainstand		
2016–2025	My Hero Academia	Ochaco Uraraka / Uravity, Recovery Girl	Replaced Juli Erickson as Recovery Girl in Season 2 due to retirement	
2016	Dennō Coil	Kenichi "Haraken" Harakawa		
2016	My Love Story!!	Nanako Yamazaki, Takeo Gouda (young)		
2017	Amagi Brilliant Park	Sylphy, Chiba		
2017	Is It Wrong to Try to Pick Up Girls in a Dungeon?	Hestia		
2017	Sakura Quest	Chikako Shinomiya		
2017	Chivalry of a Failed Knight	Stella Vermillion		
2017	Samurai Warriors	Yukimura Sanada (child)		
2017	School-Live!	Yuuri Wakasa		
2017–2022	Food Wars!: Shokugeki no Soma	Yuki Yoshino		
2017	Ushio and Tora	Akiyo Takatori, Mayko Inoue		
2017	Gate	Sherry Tyueri		
2017	Regalia: The Three Sacred Stars	Johann		
2017	Chihayafuru	Chihaya Ayase	2 seasons	
2017	Squid Girl	Chizuru Aizawa	season 2	
2017	Haven't You Heard? I'm Sakamoto	Aina Kuronuma		
2018	Tanaka-kun is Always Listless	Echizen		
2018	Flip Flappers	Cocona Kokomine		
2018	Devils' Line	Tsukasa Taira		
2018	Yamada-kun and the Seven Witches	Rika Saionji		
2018	Revue Starlight	Nana Daiba		
2018	Armed Girl's Machiavellism	Tsukuyo Inaba		
2018–2022	Made in Abyss	Reg		
2018	Bloom Into You	Touko Nanami		
2018	UQ Holder!	Asuna		
2018	Dragon Ball Super	Yurin	Ep. "A Mysterious Beauty Appears! The Enigma of the Tien Shin-Style Dojo?"	Tweet
2018	Princess Principal	Rita		
2019	Land of the Lustrous	King Ventricosus		
2019	Just Because!	Mio Natsume		
2019–2021	Fruits Basket	Hiro Soma		
2019	Mitsuboshi Colors	Yui Akamatsu		
2019	Waiting in the Summer	Rinon		
2019	Kase-san and Morning Glories	Teacher		
2019	Domestic Girlfriend	Miu Ashihara		
2019–2020	My Teen Romantic Comedy Snafu	Iroha Isshiki		
2019	Radiant	Yggdrajill		
2020	Nekopara	Azuki		
2020	BanG Dream!	Tae Hanazono	Season 2	
2020	After the Rain	Akira Tachibana		
2020	The Pet Girl of Sakurasou	Misaki Kamiigusa		
2020	The Demon Girl Next Door	Anri Sata		
2020	Wasteful Days of High School Girls	Akane "Wota" Kikuchi		
2020	The Millionaire Detective Balance: Unlimited	Mahoro Saeki		
2020	Shirobako	Mei, Noa, Poppy		
2021	Sakura Wars the Animation	Hakushu Murasame		
2021	Sonny Boy	Nozomi		
2021	Ranking of Kings	Hiling		
2022	Kakegurui ××	Miyo Inbami	Sentai Filmworks dub	
2022	Girls' Frontline	Kalina		
2022	Shenmue	Joy		
2022	Iroduku: The World in Colors	Ruri Tsukishiro		
2022	Love Live! Superstar!!	Kanon's Mother		
2022	The Eminence in Shadow	Claire Kagenou		
2023	Tomo-chan Is a Girl!	Akemi Aizawa		
2023	Akiba Maid War	Okachimachi		
2023	The Reincarnation of the Strongest Exorcist in Another World	Amyu		
2023	Farming Life in Another World	Lu Lulucy		
2024	The Demon Sword Master of Excalibur Academy	Riselia Ray Crystalia		
2024	Ninja Kamui	Emma Samanda		
2024	I've Somehow Gotten Stronger When I Improved My Farm-Related Skills	Fal-Ys Meigis		
2024	Helck	Helck (young)		
2024	Suicide Squad Isekai	Princess Fione		
2024	Jellyfish Can't Swim in the Night	Mahiru		
2024	Natsume's Book of Friends	Boy A		
2024	Oshi no Ko	Tsukuyomi		
2025	Zenshu	Unio		
2025	Loner Life in Another World	Vice Rep C		
2025	Lazarus	Christine "Chris" Blake		
2025	2.5 Dimensional Seduction	Liliel		
2025	Rock Is a Lady's Modesty	Lilisa Suzunomiya		
2025	The Dark History of the Reincarnated Villainess	Konoha		
2025	Bad Girl	Atori Mizutori		
2026	You Can't Be in a Rom-Com with Your Childhood Friends!	Shio		
2026	Rooster Fighter	Elizabeth		
2026	Kaiju Girl Caramelise	Rinko		

=== Animation ===
List of voice performances in animation
Year	Title	Role	Notes	Source
2018–present	RWBY	Lil' Miss Malachite, Fria, Little/Somewhat	Vol. 6, Ep. 2; Vol. 7, Ep. 13; Vol. 9	
2022	Link Click	Emma's Mom	Chinese donghua; English dub	
2024	RWBY Beyond	Somewhat	One Episode	

=== Film ===
List of voice performances in film
Year	Title	Role	Notes	Source
2006	Fullmetal Alchemist the Movie: Conqueror of Shamballa	Wrath		
2008	One Piece – Movie: The Desert Princess and the Pirates – Adventures in Alabasta	Nami		
2008	Appleseed Ex Machina	Deunan Knute		
2009	Tales of Vesperia: The First Strike	Rita Mordio		
2011	Trigun: Badlands Rumble	Meryl Strife		
2012	Starship Troopers: Invasion	Carmen Ibanez		
2013	One Piece Film: Strong World	Nami		
2013	Colorful	Pura Pura		
2014	One Piece Film: Z	Nami		
2014	Appleseed Alpha	Deunan Knute		
2015	Beyond the Boundary: I'll Be Here – Past	Yayoi Kanbara		
2015	Beyond the Boundary: I'll Be Here – Future	Yayoi Kanbara		
2016	The Boy and the Beast	Kyuta (young)		
2017	One Piece Film: Gold	Nami	Limited theatrical release	
2017	Starship Troopers: Traitor of Mars	Carmen Ibanez		
2017	Blade Runner Black Out 2022	Trixie	Anime short film released in the lead-up to the release of Blade Runner 2049	
2018	My Hero Academia: Two Heroes	Ochaco Uraraka	Limited theatrical release	
2019	One Piece: Stampede	Nami	Limited theatrical release	
2020	My Hero Academia: Heroes Rising	Ochaco Uraraka	Limited theatrical release	
2020	Jiang Ziya	Xiao Jiu	English dub	
2021	My Hero Academia: World Heroes' Mission	Ochaco Uraraka		
2021	Gintama: The Very Final	Tama, Catherine		
2022	One Piece Film: Red	Nami		
2023	Deemo: Memorial Keys	Fragrant Sachet, Sania		

=== Video games ===
List of voice performances in video games
Year	Title	Role	Notes	Source
2008	One Piece: Unlimited Adventure	Nami		
2011	Dragon Ball Z: Ultimate Tenkaichi	Hero (Childish)		
2012	Borderlands 2	Una, Laney White		(Note: Christian was credited for Gaige in the manual. Anthony Burch has tweeted a correction. Anthony Burch [@reverendanthony] (October 5, 2012). "To everyone who is asking, Gaige is voiced by Cherami Leigh" (Tweet) – via Twitter.)
2015	Dragon Ball Xenoverse	Time Patroller		
2016	Dragon Ball Xenoverse 2	Time Patroller		
2021	Mobile Suit Gundam: Battle Operation 2	Leona Lucraft	Game Released in 2018. English dub added in January 28, 2021, patch.	
2022	Phantom Breaker: Omnia	Cocoa		
2022	Made in Abyss: Binary Star Falling into Darkness	Reg		

=== Other media ===
List of performances in other media
Year	Title	Role	Notes	Source
2009	Rock 'N Learn	Penny	Learn Math – Money & Making Change, voice role	
2013	Abel's Field	Receptionist	live-action film	
