= Katsushi Sakurabi =

Japanese anime director

Katsushi Sakurabi (桜美かつし, Sakurabi Katsushi) is a Japanese animator, storyboard artist, and director.

== Filmography ==
=== Television series ===
| Year | Title | Role | Notes |
|---|---|---|---|
| 1997 | Revolutionary Girl Utena | Episode Director | 6 episodes |
| 1998 | Sorcerous Stabber Orphen | Episode Director | Episode: "Battle of the Dragon" |
| 2000 | Love Hina | Episode Director | Episode: "Hinatasô misshitsu genkin gôto jiken misuterina" |
| 2002 | Bluer than Indigo | Episode Director | Episode: "Genyou" |
| 2003 | Gunparade March | Series Director | 12 episodes |
| 2003 | Lunar Legend Tsukihime | Series Director | 12 episodes |
| 2006 | Yomigaeru Sora – Rescue Wings | Series Director | 12 episodes |
| 2006 | Asatte no Houkou | Series Director | 12 episodes |
| 2007 | Idolmaster: Xenoglossia | Episode Director | 3 episodes |
| 2008 | Shigofumi: Letters from the Departed | Episode Director | 4 episodes |
| 2010 | The Betrayal Knows My Name | Series Director | 12 episodes |
| 2011 | Heaven's Memo Pad | Series Director | 12 episodes |
| 2012 | Waiting in the Summer | Episode Director | 3 episodes |
| 2016 | Flying Witch | Series Director | 12 episodes |
| 2016 | Lostorage Incited WIXOSS | Series Director | 12 episodes |
| 2017 | Alice & Zoroku | Series Director | 12 episodes |
| 2019 | One-Punch Man 2 | Episode Director | Episode 11: "The Varieties of Pride" |
| 2022 | The Executioner and Her Way of Life | Episode Director/Storyboard | ED: 6, 10 | SB: 7, 10 |
| 2022 | Is It Wrong to Try to Pick Up Girls in a Dungeon? IV | Episode Director/Storyboard | ED: Episode 7, OP2 | SB: 4 Episodes, OP2 |
| 2024 | Tsukimichi: Moonlit Fantasy Season 2 | Episode Director/Storyboard | Episode 13: "The Very Busy Academy Festival" |
| 2025 | Backstabbed in a Backwater Dungeon | Series Director | |

=== Films ===
| Year | Title | Role |
|---|---|---|
| 2019 | Is It Wrong to Try to Pick Up Girls in a Dungeon?: Arrow of the Orion | Director |
