= Hestia (character) =

Fictional character

- Is It Wrong to Try to Pick Up Girls in a Dungeon? character
- Hestia as she appears in the anime adaptation
- Created by: Fujino Ōmori (based on original designs by Suzuhito Yasuda)
- Voiced by: Inori Minase (Japanese); Luci Christian (English)

Hestia (Japanese: ヘスティア, Hepburn: Hesutia) is a fictional character who appears in Fujino Ōmori's light novel series Is It Wrong to Try to Pick Up Girls in a Dungeon? (shortened to DanMachi), and its manga and anime adaptations. The series is set in the fictional world of Orario, where people join groups called Familia run by gods and goddesses, who serve a range of functions from dungeon crawling to crafting items. Hestia herself is the head and resident deity of the Hestia Familia (ヘスティア・ファミリア), a small and initially lowly group which at first contained only herself and protagonist dungeon explorer Bell. After failing to recruit anyone into her group, and Bell being unable to join any of the larger, more reputable Familias, the two join forces thus beginning their adventures in the series.

Hestia has become an extremely popular and somewhat of a breakout character in anime and manga fandom. She has also appeared in several official DanMachi related merchandise, and has been the subject of positive reception, with critics focusing on her relationship with Bell, attractiveness, and role in the series. She has also become a popular subject of cosplay, causing a trend in Japan, where women attempted to replicate her iconic costume. She is named after the Greek goddess of the hearth. Hestia is the goddess of hearth, domestic life and family. Her name means "house and hearth": the house and its occupants. Hestia symbolizes the alliance between the colonies and their mother cities.

== Character ==
Hestia is Bell's resident deity, in charge of taking care of Bell's development as an adventurer. She is jealous of Bell's involvement with other girls' affairs, including Aiz', but is still in love with him, devoted to protecting him, and helping with his growth, even after learning that he only views her as family.^{[LN 5]} She and Bell live in a room under an abandoned church, and she works part-time for the Guild as a clerk, and also some food stands to help Bell with day-to-day living expenses,^{[LN 1]} until moving to the former palace of the Apollo Familia upon defeating them in the War Game and claiming their assets. Wary about what could happen should the existence of Bell's special trait be revealed to the world, she keeps it a secret from everyone else, including Bell, until sharing it with the other members of her Familia upon being inquired about it.^{[LN 7]}

Hestia is depicted with blue eyes and black hair tied into twin ponytails. She usually wears a white mini-dress with a blue ribbon around her collar and another tied around her waist, back and arms, which has become the character's most defining feature. She also wears a pair of white gloves and usually goes barefoot. She has been nicknamed the "Loli Big-Boobs" (ロリ巨乳, rori kyonyū) for her large bust size and small height, which makes some of her deity peers like Loki jealous.^{[LN 1]} Unlike most other deities, Hestia is depicted as energetic and kind, if not slightly childish; and is also willing to form romantic relationships with a member of her Familia, being clearly infatuated with Bell.^{[LN 1]} After descending to the Lower [human] World; Hestia was initially unable to recruit anyone into her Familia due to not being well known and looked down upon. After failing to recruit for the 50th time, she noticed Bell and decided to secretly follow him. She later found out that Bell had also been trying to enter a Familia, but was too repeatedly rejected. Hestia then took the chance to recruit him, which Bell happily agreed upon.^{[LN 1]}

Hestia is voiced by Inori Minase in Japanese and by Luci Christian in English.

== Reception ==
=== Critical commentary ===
If you keep up with current anime trends then you are probably aware of Hestia, even if you've never watched a single episode of DanMachi. Rarely have characters exploded onto the anime scene with the swiftness and intensity of Bell's diminutive patron goddess. Just a casual perusal of any fanart gallery or doujinshi collection from the past couple months will yield hundreds of Hestias. Granted, quite a bit of that attention has come from the blue ribbon meant to support her sizable cleavage, but her appeal goes well beyond just being sexy. Hestia has the kind of captivating charm that innumerable anime girls strive for, but few ever achieve [...] She cares for and worries over the lead protagonist Bell Cranel beyond just seeing him as a love interest. She puts herself in great debt to acquire a weapon suitable for his needs, and is even willing to expose herself to great danger to ensure his safety. Granted, these are fairly typical endeavors for anime girls in love, but her actions also come with a special chemistry with Bell. These two are a neat pairing [...] No one else comes close to clicking so strongly with Bell.

— Theron Martin, Anime News Network

Theron Martin of Anime News Network labelled the "Hestia Factor" as one of the reasons for DanMachi's success, citing Inori Minase's voice acting, character development, as well as relationship with Bell. In a review of the series' first novel, Martin further wrote that "Fujino Ōmori's writing skill is actually higher than average [...] By the end of the novel we have a very good sense of who most of the major players are and where they stand, especially Bell and Hestia." iDigitalTimes, in a review of the DanMachi anime, found the relationship between Bell and Hestia to be "really touching", writing "she obviously loves him and wants to be with him, not simply as patron goddess but as a lover. Bell's ignorance to her every overture is a grating genre standard, but his trademark obliviousness lessens Hestia's love for Bell not a whit."

In an article titled "Is It Wrong To Try To Understand What Is Going On With Hestia's Improbable Boob Ribbon", iDigitalTimes commented that "Is It Wrong To Try To Pick Up Girls In A Dungeon? stands out for providing us with one of Japanese Twitter's latest and greatest trends", with that trend being "Hestia's boob ribbon", which "is all over the place lately." Kotaku's Richard Eisenbeis believed that DanMachi "Really [Isn't] About Picking Up Girls In A Dungeon", as the characters actually have depth, and "The other characters, while rarely as deep [as Bell], are likewise entertaining. Hestia is head-over-heals for Bell — who of course could never even fathom the idea of a goddess being in love with him. But while quick to anger and jealous to a fault, she is willing to put her money where her mouth is when it comes to supporting Bell — even if that means debasing herself to the point of taking part-time jobs. Through her, we also get a peek into the society of gods and why they are willing to sponsor heroes — bragging rights, mainly."

Anime News Network's Rebecca Silverman, in a review of the Is It Wrong to Try to Pick Up Girls in a Dungeon? anime, wrote that "Bell and Hestia [...] have a nice, comfortable feeling to their relationship. Yes, Hestia's clearly in love with him, but there's still a coziness to their interactions that feels both natural and heartwarming." She further wrote, in a list of the "Best Anime of 2015" where DanMachi ranked third, that "the chemistry between the leads, plucky young adventurer Bell Cranel and the goddess Hestia is fantastic, with the warmth of their relationship coming through not only in the animation, but also in the characters' voices. With or without any romance the two make a great pair, and the fact that Hestia clearly wants something more from their relationship than Bell does not detract from the way the two get along is pretty amazing." Although "the iconic look of the hero's patron goddess, the diminutive-but-stacked Hestia" caught the most attention, "the series also featured an intriguing setting, some unexpectedly-involved character development, great artwork as fantasy series go, and some truly outstanding battle scenes", which resulted in Theron Martin also placing DanMachi onto his list of 2015's best anime, in 5th place.

=== Popularity ===
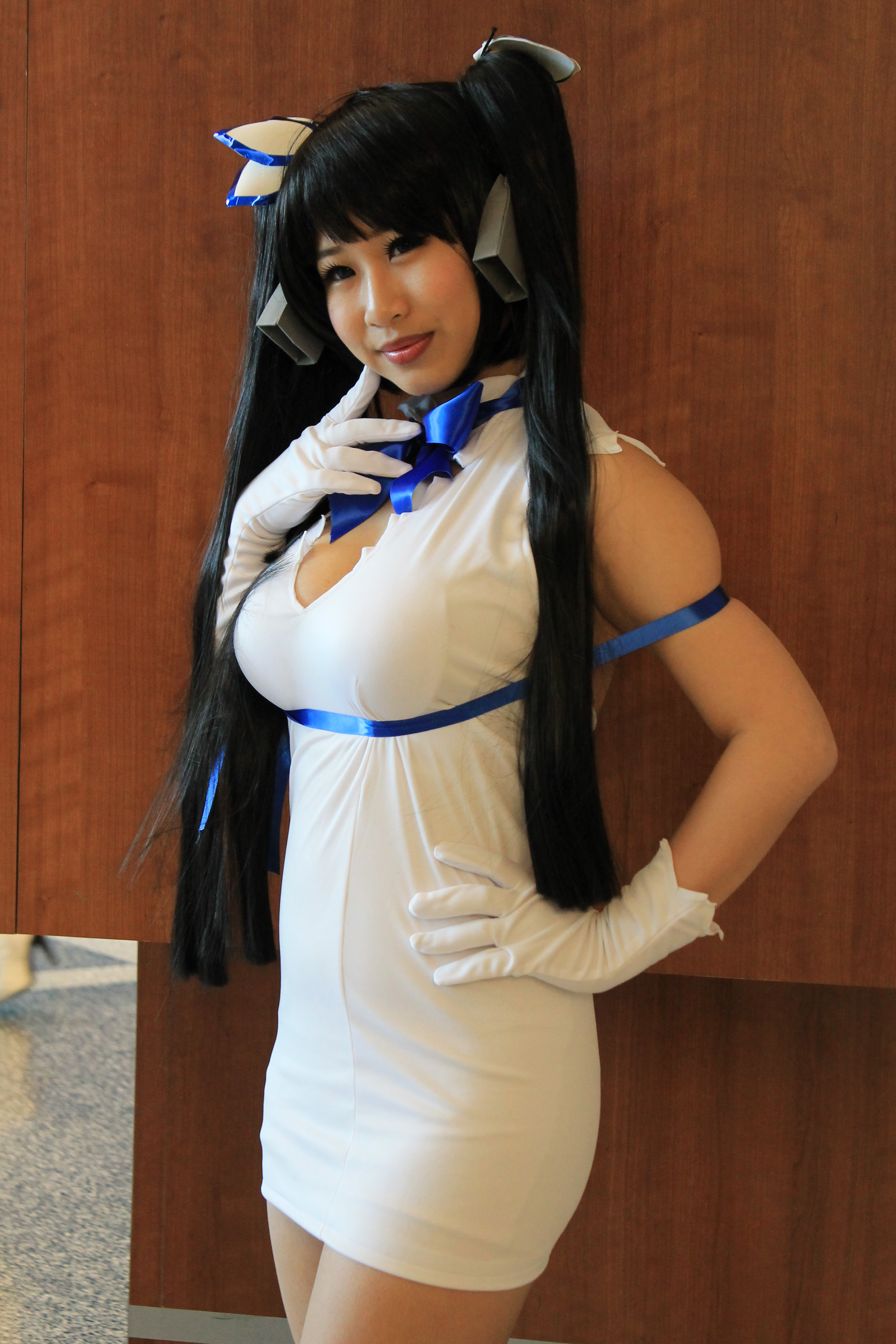
The popularity of the character has made her a frequent subject of cosplay; with Anime News Network writing that "she has become something of a cosplay challenge."

The character has become extremely popular in anime and manga fandom. This includes being prominently featured in fan dōjinshi, with the 2015 Comic1 dōjinshi event being "filled" with the character, including dedicated corners to Hestia. In a list of the "Top 22 Characters Who Transcended Their Series in 2015" by anime website GoBoiano, Hestia placed first. Italian restaurant La Ricetta in Zama, Kanagawa features pancakes prepared with anime and video game character art, including Hestia. The popularity of Hestia's character has made her a frequent subject of cosplay, with Baseel humorously noting that Hestia's costume, including "the boob-lifting string and impressive bust that the character is so closely associated with", has become more famous than the character herself.

Free Hestia blue ribbons were given away in Akihabara, leading Casey Baseel of Rocket News 24 to comment that "anime series Is It Wrong to Try to Pick Up Girls in a Dungeon?, also known by its Japanese nickname Danmachi, looks like the breakout hit of this TV season. What's the secret to its success? [...] [It] could be the outfit of female lead Hestia, which is inventive even by the already outlandishly sexy standards of anime costume design with its boob-lifting ribbon that's become known as rei no himo, or “The String” among fans in Japan." Popularity of the character has also "exploded" on Tumblr, Line, Twitter, and Pixiv, with various fan art of Hestia being featured.

Hestia's character design, especially her costume's characteristic blue string, has also gathered attention. Several cosplayers have attempted to replicate its effect, using the Twitter hashtag "#例の紐", translating to #StringExample or #ThatString. This has led to humorous images featuring the string being posted by fans, with the trend having been extended to toys and collectable items, with some pictures showing dolls in a copycat costumes as well as a Lego figure. A fad of Japanese women tying a blue ribbon underneath their breasts in similar fashion to Hestia's costume has been described by the Daily Mirror as the "weirdest craze ever", and that "We've seen some odd fads in our time, but this must be the strangest." Similarly, British newspaper Metro wrote "We know some strange things go on in Japan – but this latest fad is an eye opener".

Anjali Patel of women's magazine Bustle commented that "Hestia's blue chest ribbon has become part of her signature look in the show, a look that girls across Japan — not just cosplayers, but everyday women — are starting to emulate", and "emulating cool anime heroines would definitely earn anyone some major cool points." Alix Culbertson of Sunday Express reported that "Hordes of Japanese women are tying ribbons below their breasts and around their arms in a bid to increase their busts", resulting in mixed results. GoBoiano also noted this trend, jokingly adding "such a quality ribbon".

=== Merchandise ===
The character has received positive critical reception, and this popularity has led to her being featured in several promotional efforts and merchandise of the series. An Akihabara Is It Wrong to Try to Pick Up Girls in a Dungeon? lottery features a figure of Hestia as the grand prize, with other prizes including Hestia-themed cushions, desk mats, scarf towels, a glass, and one of three badges. Another figure from Good Smile Company also features Hestia, with the character striking a pose reminiscent of the anime's promotional images. Good Smile Company has made a second, Nendoroid version of a Hestia figure, which comes with three expressions: smiling, confident, and upset. Additional action figures, including a 26 cm one by Hobby Japan and a Hestia figure in the chibi-style figurine line Cu-poche by Japanese figure company Kotobukiya also exist.

Massively multiplayer online role-playing game Wizardry Online features Hestia's string as an equippable accessory for the game's characters, as part of a crossover collaboration with DanMachi. A chapter of Hayate the Combat Butler features character Hinagiku Katsura in Hestia's "trending outfit", and Lynzee Loveridge of Anime News Network writing that "Hestia and her notorious costume design have been picking up steam." Official Is It Wrong to Try to Pick Up Girls in a Dungeon? merchandise from Animate include Hestia tapestries, Japanese curry, and clear files. Figurine maker Kotobukiya have produced a Hestia figure prominently featuring this "bosom-lifting string".
