= List of Is It Wrong to Try to Pick Up Girls in a Dungeon? On the Side: Sword Oratoria chapters =

The manga series Is It Wrong to Try to Pick Up Girls in a Dungeon? On the Side: Sword Oratoria is written by Fujino Ōmori and illustrated by Takashi Yagi. The manga is an adaptation of Fujino Ōmori's Is It Wrong to Try to Pick Up Girls in a Dungeon? On the Side: Sword Oratoria light novel series published by Square Enix. The series started serialization in Square Enix's seinen manga magazine Young Gangan from May 22, 2014. It has since been collected in thirty-four tankōbon volumes. Yen Press has licensed the series in North America and released the first volume in October 2017.

== Volume list (Note: All english chapter titles are taken from the Yen Press translations.) ==
No.	Original release date	Original ISBN	English release date	English ISBN
1	November 13, 2014	978-4-7575-4465-9	October 31, 2017	978-0-316-55286-8
quest 1: Sword Princess Ais (剣姫(アイズ), Aizu); quest 2: Quest to the Unknown (未知(クエスト), Kuesuto); quest 3: High-Voltage Combat (激闘(ハイボルテージ), Hai Borutēji); quest 4: First Contact with the White Rabbit (白兎(ファーストコンタクト), Fāsuto Kontakuto)
2	March 25, 2015	978-4-7575-4593-9	January 30, 2018	978-0-316-55864-8
quest 5: Dream Catcher (記憶(ドリームキャッチャー), Dorīmu Kyacchā); quest 6: I Miss... (気持(アイミス...), Ai Misu...); quest 7: Hetero Carnival (開祭(ヘテロ・カーニバル), Hetero Kānibaru); quest 8: Heroes (街戦(ヒーローズ), Hīrōzu)
3	May 15, 2015	978-4-7575-4638-7	May 8, 2018	978-0-316-44796-6
quest 9: Next Quest (事件(ネクストクエスト), Nekusuto Kuesuto); quest 10: Detectives (調査(ディテクティブズ), Ditekutibuzu); quest 11: Red Rum (容疑(レッドラム), Reddoramu); quest 12: Unknown (犯人(アンノウン), Announ)
4	October 14, 2015	978-4-7575-4767-4	July 24, 2018	978-0-316-44799-7
quest 13: Transformative Parasite (変貌(パラサイト), Parasaito); quest 14: Silent Scream (渇望(サイレントスクリーム), Sairento Sukurīmu); quest 15: Black King Udaeus (黒王(ウダイオス), Udaiosu); quest 16: A Wish for a Grand Feat (偉業(ウィッシュフォア), Wisshu Foa)
5	March 25, 2016	978-4-7575-4926-5	October 30, 2018	978-0-316-44803-1
quest 17: Black Curse (黒炎(カースオブブラック), Kāsu obu Burakku); quest 18: Conference (会議(レビュー), Rebyū); quest 19: Allies from Hermes Familia (仲間(ヘルメス・ファミリア), Herumesu Famiria); quest 20: Filvis's Painful Pursuit (追惜(フィルヴィスペイン), Firuvisu Pein)
6	October 13, 2016	978-4-7575-5121-3	January 22, 2019	978-0-316-44806-2
quest 21: Labyrinth Wanderer (迷宮(ワンダラー), Wandarā); quest 22: Selective Division (分断(セレクション), Serekushon); quest 23: Arrival at the Red Zone (到着(レッドゾーン), Reddo Zōn); quest 24: The Fray (混戦(メイレーアタック), Meirē Atakku)
7	March 25, 2017	978-4-7575-5289-0	April 30, 2019	978-0-316-44809-3
quest 25: Get Violent (闘乱(ゲットバイオレント), Getto Baiorento); quest 26: Abnormal Case (異常(エラーケース), Erā Kēsu); quest 27: Blossom Blast (開火(ブロッサムブラスト), Burossamu Burasuto); quest 28: The Decisive Battle (決戦(ザ・タイム), Za Taimu)
8	April 13, 2017	978-4-7575-5316-3	August 6, 2019	978-0-316-44813-0
quest 29: Homecoming (帰還(ホームカミング), Hōmukamingu); quest 30: Rival (好敵(ライバル), Raibaru); quest 31: Elf Ring (同胞(エルフ・リング), Erufu Ringu); quest 32: Preparations (準備(ビルドアップ), Birudoappu); Bonus Story
9	June 13, 2017	978-4-7575-5369-9	November 12, 2019	978-1-9753-3209-9
quest 33: Expedition's Departure (遠征(ディパーチャー), Dipāchā); quest 34: The Adventurer Bell Cranell (冒険(ベル・クラネル), Beru Kuraneru); quest 35: The Hero Argonaut (英雄(アルゴノゥト), Arugonouto); quest 36: Full Speed into the Depths (疾層(フルスピード), Furu Supīdo)
10	February 13, 2018	978-4-7575-5559-4	January 21, 2020	978-1-9753-3212-9
quest 37: Never Fall Down (落火(ネバーフォールダウン), Nebā Fōru Daun); quest 38: Encounter (合流(エンカウント), Enkaunto); quest 39: Demi-Spirit (精霊(デミ・スピリット), Demi Supiritto); quest 40: Sing the Gleaming Light (一閃(シングザライト), Shinguza Raito)
11	May 11, 2018	978-4-7575-5712-3	April 28, 2020	978-1-9753-3215-0
quest 41: Quintessential Rest Time (休息(レストタイム), Resuto Taimu); quest 42: Denatus (神会(デナトゥス), Denatusu); quest 43: Healthy Day (嫌好(ヘルシーデイ), Herushī Dei); quest 44: Visitors (客人(ヴィジター), Vijitā); quest 45: Bath Time Soak (水浴(バスタイム), Basutaimu)
12	February 13, 2019	978-4-7575-5907-3	August 18, 2020	978-1-9753-1307-4
quest 46: The Two Lost Children (二人(ロストチルドレン), Rosuto Chirudoren); quest 47: Cooperation (共闘(コープ), Kōpu); quest 48: Signs (兆候(サインズ), Sainzu); quest 49: Travel Trouble (外出(トラベル・トラブル), Toraberu Toraburu); quest 50: Inquiry (聴取(インクワイアリー), Inkuwaiarī)
13	February 13, 2019	978-4-7575-6005-5	November 24, 2020	978-1-9753-1310-4
quest 51: Combat Country Telskyura (闘国(テルスキュラ), Terusukyura); quest 52: Hostage Threat (脅迫(ホステイジ), Hosuteiji); quest 53: A Past Under the Moon (月陽(パストタイム), Pasuto Taimu); quest 54: War Party's Starting Bell (開戦(ウォーパーティー), Wō Pātī); quest 55: Burst Out (激化(バーストアウト), Bāsuto Auto)
14	July 12, 2019	978-4-7575-6203-5	February 2, 2021	978-1-9753-1319-7
quest 56: Judging the True Culprit (真犯(ジャッジメント), Jajjimento); quest 57: Reinforcements (加勢(ファイトバック), Faito Bakku); quest 58: Blue Sky (青空(ブルースカイ), Burū Sukai); quest 59: Cleaning Up (処理(クリーンアップ), Kurīn'appu); quest 60: Daedalus Street (迷街(ダイダロス), Daidarosu)
15	December 12, 2019	978-4-7575-6432-9	April 4, 2021	978-1-9753-1507-8
quest 61: Enemy Territory (敵地(アナザーダンジョン), Anazā Danjon); quest 62: Lethal Nightmare (致命(ナイトメア), Naitomea); quest 63: The Fringe (端役(エキストラ), Ekisutora); quest 64: Thanatos the Evil God (邪神(タナトス), Tanatosu); quest 65: Jack-of-All-Trades, Raul Nord (二流(ラウル・ノールド), Rauru Nōrudo)
16	July 22, 2020	978-4-7575-6702-3	December 28, 2021	978-1-9753-2129-1
quest 66: Fight Back (結集(ファイトバック), Faito Bakku); quest 67: Gugaranna (凶牛(グガランナ), Gugaranna); quest 68: Edge of the Cliff (綱引(エッジオブクリフ), Ejji obu Kurifu); quest 69: The Lost (落命(ゴーンズ), Gōnzu); quest 70: Memorial 1 (古攵郷(メモリアル1), Memoriaru 1)
17	November 21, 2020	978-4-7575-6941-6	June 14, 2022	978-1-9753-3381-2
quest 71: A Date with a Werewolf (逢引(デートウィズウルフ), Dēto uizu Urufu); quest 72: Memorial 2 (帰郷(メモリアル2), Memoriaru 2); quest 73: Rain of Tears (沛雨(ティアーズレイン), Tiāzu Rein); quest 74: Memorial 3 (在処(メモリアル3), Memoriaru 3)
18	March 25, 2021	978-4-7575-7170-9	October 4, 2022	978-1-9753-3842-8
quest 75: Hunter (狼人(ハンター), Hantā); quest 76: Vanargand (凶狼(ヴァナルガンド), Vanarugando); quest 77: Forget-Me-Not (花束(ミオソティス), Miosotisu); quest 78: Break (ー手(ブレイク), Bureiku)
19	December 25, 2021	978-4-7575-7645-2	April 25, 2023	978-1-9753-6129-7
quest 79: Alarm (警鐘(ワンダリングベル), Wandaringu Beru); quest 80: Fool (愚者(コラプトヒーロー), Koraputo Hīrō); quest 81: Monster (怪物(モンスター), Monsutā); quest 82: Interrogating the Divine (神問(インタロゲイション), Intarogeishon)
20	December 25, 2021	978-4-7575-7645-2	August 22, 2023	978-1-9753-6720-6
quest 83: Bright (眩想(ブライト), Buraito); quest 84: Two Fronts (二面(トゥーフェイス), Toū Feisu); quest 85: Command (号令(ローリングファイターズ), Rōringu Faitāzu); quest 86: Gale (疾風(リュー・リオン), Ryū Rion)
21	March 22, 2022	978-4-7575-7830-2	November 21, 2023	978-1-9753-7173-9
quest 87: Pincer Attack (狭撃(サンドイッチ), Sandoitchi); quest 88: Charge (突撃(カウンターアタック), Kauntā Atakku); quest 89: Encounter (遭遇(ランダウン), Randaun); quest 90: Extend (拡伸(リーチフォア), Rīchi foa)
22	July 22, 2022	978-4-7575-8032-9	March 19, 2024	978-1-9753-7175-3
quest 91: Behind the Scenes (表題(トゥーサイド), Toū Saido); quest 92: Promise (契約(デウスデア), Deusudea); quest 93: Divine Will (神意(ザハンドオブゴッド), Za Hando obu Goddo); quest 94: Rematch (再戦(ワンスモア), Wansu Moa)
23	January 25, 2023	978-4-7575-8352-8	June 18, 2024	978-1-9753-7371-9
quest 95: Argonaut (英雄(アルゴノゥト), Arugonouto); quest 96: Reconciliation (交渉(レコンシリエイト), Rekonshirieito); quest 97: Familia Meeting (収会(ミーティンオブファミリア), Mītin obu Famiria); quest 98: Run Again (再走(ランアゲイン), Ran Agein)
24	January 25, 2023	978-4-7575-8353-5	October 15, 2024	978-1-9753-7480-8
quest 99: Smile Always, As Ever (約束(スマイル オルウェイズ アズ エバー), Sumairu Oruweizu azu Ebā); quest 100: Overturn (開始(オーバーチュア), Ōbāchua); quest 101: Knossos War (再桃(クノッソス・ウォー), Kunossosu Wō); quest 102: Attack on Knossos (攻略(アタックオンクノッソス), Atakku on Kunossosu)
25	June 12, 2023	978-4-7575-8620-8	March 18, 2025	978-1-9753-8889-8
quest 103: Happy Birthday (産声(ハッピーバースデイ), Happī Bāsudei); quest 104: Painful Days (黒血(ペインフルデイズ), Peinfuru Deizu); quest 105: Amid Teasanare (聖女(アミッド・テアサナール), Amiddo Teasanāru); quest 106: Countdown (祭壇(カウントダウン), Kauntodaun)
26	November 25, 2023	978-4-7575-8914-8	August 26, 2025	978-1-9753-9825-5
quest 107: Requiem for a Dream (劇性(レクイエムフォードリーム), Rekuiemu fō Dorīmu); quest 108: Greed (起動(ザ・グリード), Za Gurīdo); quest 109: Escape (敗走(エスケイプ), Esukeipu); quest 110: Whodunit (黒幕(フーダニット), Fūdanitto)
27	March 22, 2024	978-4-7575-9113-4	February 24, 2026	979-8-8554-1587-2
quest 111: By Your Side (寄添(バイユアサイド), Bai Yua Saido); quest 112: Examination (追捜(エグザミネイション), Eguzamineishon); quest 113: Premonition (予感(プリモニション), Purimonishon); quest 114: Whispering (伝言(ウィスパリング), Wisuparingu)
28	September 21, 2024	978-4-7575-9427-2	August 25, 2026	979-8-8554-2475-1
quest 115: Time Limit (刻限(タイムリミット), Taimu Rimitto); quest 116: War Cry (閧声(ウォークライ), Wō Kurai); quest 117: Die-Hard (奮旗(ダイハード), Dai Hādo); quest 118: Darkest Place (地獄(ダーケストプレイス), Dākesuto Pureisu)
29	November 21, 2024	978-4-7575-9519-4	—	—
quest 119: Tenpesuto (起動(テンペスト)); quest 120: Abenjā (復讐(アベンジャー)); quest 121: Feisu Ofu (対峙(フェイスオフ)); quest 122: Fūdanitto (真相(フーダニット))
30	February 25, 2025	978-4-7575-9690-0	—	—
quest 123: Didakushon (解答(ディダクション)); quest 124: Mōtibu (理由(モーティブ)); quest 125: Separeishon (別涙(セパレイション)); quest 126: Apokaripusu (死動(アポカリプス))
31	July 22, 2025	978-4-7575-9962-8	—	—
quest 127: Kuritikaru Pointo (臨回(クリティカルポイント)); quest 128: Metamoria Furēze (集結(メタモリア・フレーゼ)); quest 129: Fureiya Famiria (援軍(フレイヤ・ファミリア)); quest 130: Hesutia Famiria (二面(ヘスティア・ファミリア))
32	October 9, 2025	978-4-301-00123-2	—	—
quest 131: Beru Atakku (飛躍(ベルアタック)); quest 132: Feitofuru (選択(フェイトフル)); quest 133: Purofairu (評禍(プロファイル)); quest 134: Dākesuto Bifō Dōn (黎明(ダーケストビフォードーン))
33	March 21, 2026	978-4-301-00399-1	—	—
quest 135: Daburu (追奏(ダブル)); quest 136: Rimitto Bureiku (鐘音(リミット・ブレイク)); quest 137: Tenpesuto (白風(テンペスト)); quest 138: Endōbudeizu (決着(エンドオブデイズ))
34	July 24, 2026	978-4-3010-0652-7	—	—
quest 139: Feaēru (光冠(フェアエール)); quest 140: Misuyū (彷徨(ミスユー)); quest 141: Fūamuai (変化(フーアムアイ)); quest 142: Ritoru Aizu (昔話(リトル・アイズ))

=== Chapters not yet in tankōbon format ===
These chapters have yet to be published in a tankōbon volume.

- quest 143: Kiringu Dōru (人形(キリングドール))
- quest 144: Ōrudo Roki Famiria (和気(オールドロキ・ファミリア))
- quest 145: Earieru (Hahakaze) (母風(エアリエル))
- quest 146: Sukūru Raifu (Gakku) (学区(スクールライフ))
- quest 147: Sukuaddo Sebun (Kōhai) (後輩(スクアッド７))
- quest 148. Insutorakuto (Kyōdō) (教導(インストラクト))
