= Kentaro Tone =

Japanese voice actor

- 利根健太朗
- Born: May 29, 1982 (age 44)
- Occupation: Voice actor
- Years active: 2006–present
- Employer: I'm Enterprise
- Notable work: Danchi Tomoo as Tetsuo Kinoshita; Utawarerumono as Oshtor and Haku; This Art Club Has a Problem! as the President; Ingress as Zion Kunikida
- Spouse: Yuka Takakura
- Children: 1

Kentaro Tone (Japanese: 利根 健太朗, Hepburn: Tone Kentarō; born May 29, 1982) is a Japanese voice actor from Hiroshima Prefecture, affiliated with I'm Enterprise. He made his voice acting debut in digital content made for a 2006 exhibition at The Museum of Modern Art, Ibaraki, and he later starred as Akita Hattori in Bakuman, Tetsuo Kinoshita in Danchi Tomoo, Oshtor and Haku in Utawarerumono, the President in This Art Club Has a Problem!, and Zion Kunikida in Ingress.

== Biography ==
Kentaro Tone, a native of Hiroshima Prefecture, was born on May 29, 1982. As a young child, he lived in the United States due to his father's work. After returning to Japan, he was educated at Hiroshima Johoku Junior and Senior High School, where he was part of the broadcasting club. He later spent seven years in the Tokyo University of Foreign Studies (TUFS), where he majored in Tagalog.

TUFS did not have a broadcasting club at the time, so Tone had to join a drama club, where he knew actor Ryohei Suzuki. He then enrolled in the Japan Narration Acting Institute in his second year at TUFS, and he joined I'm Enterprise during his second year at the Institute. He made his voice acting debut in 2006 when he discussed paintings for digital content made for the Mayonaka no Bijutsukan exhibition at The Museum of Modern Art, Ibaraki.

In 2011, it was announced that he would voice Shun Izuki, a main character in Kuroko's Basketball. He later voiced Takayanagi in Young Black Jack (2015), John Gordon in Joker Game (2016), and Club President in This Art Club Has a Problem! (2016). In 2018, he voiced Uriyanedi in Angolmois: Record of Mongol Invasion, Zion Kunikida in Ingress, and Takuma Yoshikiri in Nil Admirari no Tenbin. He later voiced Carlos Ali in Maesetsu! (2020), Booze Man in To Your Eternity (2021), Dir in Banished from the Hero's Party (2021), and Jürgen Borisovich Volk in The Prince of Tennis II: U-17 World Cup (2022). In 2023, he was cast as Tokita-kun in The Girl I Like Forgot Her Glasses and Liu Shenqiang in Mobile Suit Gundam SEED Freedom.

He voices Oshtor in the Utawarerumono franchise, reprising his role in the 2015 anime adaptation Utawarerumono: The False Faces. After Keiji Fujiwara's death in 2020, he succeeded him as the voice of Haku in the 2021 spin-off Utawarerumono: Zan 2. He reprised both roles in the 2022 anime Utawarerumono: Mask of Truth.

On June 15, 2019, it was confirmed on both his and voice actress Yuka Takakura's Twitter accounts that they had married. Their first child, a girl, was born on December 24, 2021.

== Filmography ==
=== Animated television ===
Year	Title	Role	Ref.
2006	Hell Girl	Hachiroku Toyoda	
2007	Sgt. Frog	Putata	
2008	Naruto	Nurari	
2010	Bakuman	Satoshi Hattori	
2011	Toriko	manager Smith	
2012	K	boss	
2012	Kuroko's Basketball	Shun Izuki	
2013	Danchi Tomoo	Tetsuo Kinoshita	
2013	Date A Live	Mikimoto	
2013	Gaist Crusher	Dr. Magnus	
2015	Concrete Revolutio	IQ	
2015	Junjo Romantica: Pure Romance	Kimura	
2015	Overlord	Zack	
2015	Young Black Jack	Takayanagi	
2015	Utawarerumono: The False Faces	Oshtor	
2016	Joker Game	John Gordon	
2016	Luck & Logic	Incubus	
2016	This Art Club Has a Problem!	Club President	
2018	Angolmois: Record of Mongol Invasion	Uriyanedi	
2018	Ingress	Zion Kunikida	
2018	Nil Admirari no Tenbin	Takuma Yoshikiri	
2018	Radiant	Miss Melba's father	
2019	Star Twinkle PreCure	Carlos	
2020	Maesetsu!	Carlos Ali	
2021	Banished from the Hero's Party	Dir	
2021	To Your Eternity	Booze Man	
2022	Life with an Ordinary Guy Who Reincarnated into a Total Fantasy Knockout	Miggy	
2022	The Prince of Tennis II: U-17 World Cup	Jürgen Borisovich Volk	
2022	Utawarerumono: Mask of Truth	Haku, Oshtor	
2023	The Girl I Like Forgot Her Glasses	Tokita-kun	
2024	The Strongest Magician in the Demon Lord's Army Was a Human	Jiron	
2024	Kinnikuman: Perfect Origin Arc	Currycook	
2024	365 Days to the Wedding	Susumu Shinshi	
2025	Zenshu	Chingosman	
2025	I Have a Crush at Work	Itsurō Mita	
2025	Catch Me at the Ballpark!	Dennis Young	
2025	Cultural Exchange with a Game Centre Girl	Oliver Baker	
2027	In a World Full of Zombies I'm the Only One Who Doesn't Get Attacked	Skull Man	

=== Animated film ===
Year	Title	Role	Ref.
2024	Mobile Suit Gundam SEED Freedom	Liu Shenqiang	

=== Video games ===
Year	Title	Role	Ref.
2011	Akiba's Trip	Yatabe-san	
2016	Nil Admirari no Tenbin: Teito Genwaku Kitan	Takuma Yoshikiri	
2021	Utawarerumono: Zan 2	Haku, Oshtor	

=== Other media ===
Year	Title	Role	Ref.
2014	Project 758	Zero	
2026	Cyberpunk: Edgerunners 2	Weak Kingsley	
