= List of UQ Holder! chapters =

UQ Holder! is a Japanese manga series written and illustrated by Ken Akamatsu. It began its serialization in the manga magazine Weekly Shōnen Magazine on August 28, 2013. Its individual chapters have been collected into twenty-eight tankōbon volumes by Kodansha, the first released on December 17, 2013. The story is set in the same universe as Akamatsu's previous work Negima! Magister Negi Magi, but over 70 years later, it follows the adventures of a young boy named Tōta Konoe who is transformed into a vampire by his foster parent Yukihime and joins a secret society composed of immortal beings called UQ Holder.

The series is licensed for English language release in North America by Kodansha USA under the Kodansha Comics imprint, who published the first volume on March 18, 2014. As the series is published in Japan, it is also released simultaneously in English digitally by Crunchyroll. Individual chapters of the series are called stages.

== Volumes list ==
No.	Original release date	Original ISBN	English release date	English ISBN
1	December 17, 2013	978-4-06-394990-2	March 18, 2014	978-1-61262-933-9 (NA); 978-1-61262-933-9 (UK)
1. "Beauty and the Boy" (美女と少年, "Bijo to Shōnen"); 2. "Stupid Immortality!" (不老不死なんて！, "Furōfushi Nante!"); 3. "I Thought We Could Be Friends" (仲良くできると思った, "Nakayoku Dekiru to Omotta"); 4. "Tōta's Scheme" (刀太の奇策, "Tōta no Kisaku"); 5. "A Moment of Respite, A Manly Pursuit" (旅の休息、男のロマン, "Tabi no Kyūsoku, Otokonoroman"); 6. "What Happens Next?" (一寸先は？, "Itsusunsaki Wa?")
Village boy Tōta Konoe and his friends have been training to someday beat their school teacher Yukihime in physical combat so they can go to the big city. Using a bracelet to restrict Yukihime's power, Tachibana, a teacher who is actually a bounty hunter, attacks Yukihime, and mortally wounds Tōta. Yukihime, who is actually Evangeline A.K. McDowell, a 700-year-old vampire mage, has Tōta drink her blood to realize his powers as an immortal vampire which she bestowed to him two years prior. Tōta defeats Tachibana, and the two leave the village to journey to the city. Along the way, they meet some village kids including Shinobu Yuki who aspires to be a spaceship racer. Tota meets Kurōmaru Tokisaka, a feminine-looking boy who is actually an assassin sent to slay Yukihime. Kurōmaru and Tōta agree to fight, but Kurōmaru loses, and Tōta's condition is that Kurōmaru be his best friend. At a hot springs spa town, Tōta and Kurōmaru challenge Yukihime to steal her bath towel. Kurōmaru agrees to be Yukihime's disciple, and Tōta talks about wanting to form a team of immortals to help the world. As her assistants arrive to retrieve her and the boys, Yukihime reveals she has already formed a group of immortal beings called UQ Holder.
2	March 17, 2014	978-4-06-395037-3	July 8, 2014	978-1-61262-935-3 (NA); 978-1-61262-935-3 (UK)
7. "UQ Holder" (UQホルダー, "Yūkyū Horudā"); 8. "The Strength of a Leader" (リーダーの力, "Rīdā no Chikara"); 9. "Let the Training Begin" (修行開始, "Shugyō Kaishi"); 10. "The Gravity Blade" (重力剣, "Jūryoku Ken"); 11. "Beast Exterminators" (魔獣退治, "Majū Taiji"); 12. "The First Mission" (初任務, "Hatsu Ninmu"); 13. "I Refuse To Be Beaten" (負けられない, "Makerarenai"); 14. "Magic Apps" (魔法アプリ, "Mahō Apuri"); 15. "The Fruits of Training" (修行の成果, "Shugyō no Seika"); 16. "The Blind Immortal Hunter" (盲目の不死狩り, "Mōmoku no Fushigari"); 17. "The Assassins Strike" (刺客襲来, "Shikaku Shūrai")
At UQ Holder headquarters, Yukihime's attendants immediately celebrate her return. When Tōta declares he is joining UQ Holder, he and Kurōmaru are given a trial of having to escape from the underground area with a time limit of eight years. They meet UQ Holder leader Jinbei Shishido, who trains the two and has Tōta master the gravity blade. After a month, Tōta and Kurōmaru defeat the monsters. They work with UQ Holder member Karin Yuuki to defend a village from some land sharks and an attacker named Wrecking Ball. After being defeated by Kurōmaru and Karin in arm wrestling, Tōta trains in the movement art of shundō where he learns some techniques from a passing martial artist named Kaito. Karin learns of Kurōmaru's characteristic of being genderless, and tells Kurōmaru to choose being a female. Chao Xinxai, a special forces member of the immortal hunting group PMSCS, attacks Karin.
3	June 17, 2014	978-4-06-395085-4	November 11, 2014	978-1-61262-937-7 (NA); 978-1-61262-937-7 (UK)
18. "We Are Friends, Aren't We?" (友達だよね？, "Tomodachi da yo ne?"); 19. "I Have To!" (やるしかない, "Yaru Shika Nai"); 20. "The Saintess of Steel" (鋼鉄の聖女, "Kōtetsu no Seijo"); 21. "Tōta Revives" (刀太復活, "Tōta Fukkatsu"); 22. "Fellow Have-Nothings" (ないもの同士, "Nai Mono Dōshi"); 23. "Tōta vs. Kaito" (刀太VS灰斗, "Tōta VS Kaito"); 24. "Magia Erebea" (闇の魔法, "Magia Erebea"); 25. "Take Hold of The World" (世界を掴む, "Sekai o Tsukamu"); 26. "Karin in Crisis" (夏凛の危機, "Karin no Kiki"); 27. "Tōta vs. Nagumo" (刀太VS南雲, "Tōta VS Nagumo"); 28. "Enter the Numbers!" (ナンバーズ、来る！, "Nanbāzu, Kitaru!")
PMSCS's Powerful Hand group attacks the UQ Holder members at the city slums while burning down the city. A werewolf binds Tōta with a sealing spell, leaving Kurōmaru to fight him. Meanwhile, Karin fights and defeats the shadow puppet master mage Chao Xinxai. The werewolf is winning when one of the kids Ruki tries to protect Kurōmaru and Tōta is able to break the binding spell with the powerful transformation Magia Erebea. Tōta defeats the werewolf, who is revealed to be Kaito, but spares his life. Nagumo attacks Karin, sending her to the Moon. Nagumo has the PMSCS capture Tōta, but Yukihime and the other UQ Holder members arrive.
4	September 17, 2014	978-4-06-395191-2	March 17, 2015	978-1-61262-832-5 (NA); 978-1-61262-832-5 (UK)
29. "The Strength of Numbers" (ナンバーズ達の実力, "Nanbāzu-tachi no Jitsuryoku"); 30. "After the Battle" (戦いの後には, "Tatakai no Ato ni wa"); 31. "A New Number" (新たなナンバーズ, "Aratana Nanbāzu"); 32. "The Real Kirie Sakurame" (桜雨キリヱの正体, "Sakurame Kiriwe no Shōtai"); 33. "OK to Reset!" (リセットOK!, "Risetto OK!"); 34. "Return of the Creepy Assassin!" (キモ刺客、再び！, "Kimo Shikaku, Futatabi!"); 35. "The Future To Be Avoided" (避けるべき未来, "Sakerubeki Mirai"); 36. "Kirie's Secret Plan!" (切り絵の秘策...!, "Kirie no Hisaku...!"); 37. "Fate Averruncus" (フェイト・アーウェルンクス, "Feito Āuerunkusu"); 38. "The Operation Is a Go!!" (作戦決行!!, "Sakusen Kekkō!!"); 39. "The Battle Continues!!" (戦闘続行！！, "Sentō Zokkō!!"); 40. "Carrying Out the Plan" (あの時, "Ano Toki")
Jinbei defeats Nagumo, and Yukihime uses her ice spell to put out the fires. Tōta accompanies Kirië Sakurame, a UQ Holder member and primary patron of the group who has the ability to rewind time, using it to survive multiple assassination attempts, later revealed to be coming from Chao Xinxai. Their mission is to meet with Fate Averruncus, UQ Holder's enemy and former friend/rival of Negi Springfield, and to stop him from claiming Tōta's head and from destroying UQ Holder. The mission is almost a failure as Fate almost takes Tōta's friends hostage and petrifies Kirië. Tōta and the others are forced to fight Fate and his assistants. But Kirië's petrification expires and she is able to pull Fate and the others back in time with her.
5	December 17, 2014	978-4-06-395269-8	July 7, 2015	978-1-61262-833-2 (NA); 978-1-61262-833-2 (UK)
41. "Unexpected 20-Year Reunion" (20年目の邂逅, "20-Nen-me no Kaikō"); 42. "Questions for Fate" (フェイトへの質問, "Feito e no Shitsumon"); 43. "Undercover Investigation" (潜入捜査, "Sennyū Sōsa"); 44. "The Rules of the Academy City" (学園都市のルール, "Gakuen Toshi no Rūru"); 45. "Serial Killer" (連続殺人, "Renzoku Satsujin"); 46. "The Psion" (超能力者, "Chōnōryoku-sha"); 47. "Psion VS Immortals" (超能力者VS.不死者, "Chōnōryoku-sha VS. Fushisha"); 48. "Pleasant Memories" (楽しい記憶, "Tanoshii Kioku"); 49. "The Truth of the Matter" (事件の真相, "Jiken no Shinsō"); 50. "The Real Killer" (真犯人, "Shinhannin"); 51. "Sayoko and Santa" (小夜子と三太, "Sayoko to Santa")
After Fate and Evangeline fight, Fate offers to answer questions posed by the UQ Holder members, during which Tota learns that Fate wants to use him in order to find Negi Springfriend and to save the world, but that Fate also killed Tota's parents. Although Tota doesn't agree to follow Fate, he agrees to train up before meeting him again. Tota, Kuromaru, Karin, and Ikku work undercover as students of the city academy in order to track down an immortal who has been murdering students. They room with shut-in student Santa Sasaki, who unbeknownst to the gang, had been tracking the UQ Holder members and seems to be the immortal they are looking for. Kuromaru learns that Santa has been dead for eight years and he is a vengeful spirit called a revenant. But more murders occur, and Karin is attacked by Sayoko, who was the actual murderer, and the necromancer that turned Santa into the revenant.
6	March 17, 2015	978-4-06-395349-7	November 24, 2015	978-1-63236-119-6
52. "Town under Attack" (襲われた街, "Osowareta Machi"); 53. "Hope Arrives" (希望はやって来る, "Kibō wa Yattekuru"); 54. "Zombified" (ゾンビ化, "Zonbi-ka"); 55. "Goodbye" (さようなら, "Sayōnara"); 56. "Sayoko and Santa" (小夜子と三太, "Sayoko to Santa"); 57. "The Battle Heats Up" (戦闘激化, "Sentō Gekika"); 58. "Airborne Battle of Abilities" (能力×空中戦, "Nōryoku × Kūchū-sen"); 59. "A Sworn Friend" (盟友として, "Meiyū to Shite"); 60. "It Ends" (全て終わり, "Subete Owari"); 61. "Kuromaru's Woes" (九郎丸の苦悩, "Kurōmaru no Kunō"); 62. "Livening Things Up" (一層賑やかに, "Issō Nigiyaka ni")
Sayoko uses a virus that turns the students and city folk into a horde of zombies. She disables Kirie, preventing her from going back to the save point, and then defeats Tota and the others. Breaking free of Sayoko's influence, Santa tries to help the populace. He thinks about his past with Sayoko, and how he was murdered, but that he no longer wants revenge. While Tota and Karin recover from the virus, Tota has to deal with Kuromaru. Santa is able to reach Sayoko and convince her to stop the killing, after which Sayoko dissipates into sakura flower petals. Kirie takes the gang back to the save point; Santa brings two of the petals, at which Sayoko then acknowledges she has been defeated and that it is time for her to leave the world. Santa joins UQ Holder. The gang pay a visit to the baths, during which Kuromaru struggles with his feelings for Tota now that he has another comrade in Santa.
7	June 17, 2015	978-4-06-395421-0	March 8, 2016	978-1-63236-209-4
63. "A Ridiculously Strong Lady" (とんでもなく強ぇ姉ちゃん, "Tondemonaku Tsuee Nēchan"); 64. "The Mahora Martial Arts Tournament" (まほら武道会, "Mahora Budōkai"); 65. "Negi Springfield" (ネギ・スプリングフィールド, "Negi Supuringufīrudo"); 66. "Define the Relationship" (関係の名前, "Kankei no Namae"); 67. "What if I Ran Away from Home?" (家出してみたら, "Iede Shite Mitara"); 68. "The Preliminaries" (予選会, "Yosenkai"); 69. "Using Apps" (アプリ使用, "Apuri Shiyō"); 70. "Attacker" (襲撃者, "Shūgekisha"); 71. "The Truth About Touta" (刀太の真実, "Tōta no Shinjitsu"); 72. "Caring Friends" (仲間思い, "Nakama Omoi"); 73. "Recognition" (認識, "Ninshiki"); 74. "Avoiding a Nightmare" (悪夢の回避, "Akumu no Kaihi")
Tota meets Mana Tatsumiya, a former student of Negi and the acting director for Amanomihashira Academy, who informs him of an upcoming magic/fighting tournament that will give him a chance to go to the orbital station. When Yukihime learns that Negi Springfield is entering the tournament, and that the message was authenticated by Fate, she cancels Tota's registration and forbids him from entering, as she will personally see to the matter. Tota leaves the headquarters and meets a prospective fighter who explains how one can enter the tournament by accumulating points in a qualification round. When Tota is attacked by a girl in a cloak who is able to defeat him, his comrades at UQ Holder save him. The girl tells him that he is not the grandson of Negi Springfield, but a cheap clone. But the girl threatens to destroy the city unless Tota makes it into the tournament.
8	September 17, 2015	978-4-06-395421-0	July 19, 2016	978-1-63236-271-1
75. "Tournament Battles" (トーナメント戦, "Tōnamento-sen"); 76. "Yesterday's Enemy is Today's Teacher" (昨日の敵は今日の師, "Kinō no Teki wa Kyō no Shi"); 77. "The Power of Nobility" (貴族の強さ, "Kizoku no Tsuyosa"); 78. "Yukihime and the Witch of the Rift" (雪姫とリフトの魔女, "Yukihime to Rifuto no Majo"); 79. "Spartan Training" (スパルタトレーニング, "Suparuta Torēningu"); 80. "One Step Forward" (一歩前進, "Ippo Zenshin"); 81. "The Meaning of Training" (修行の意味, "Shugyō no Imi"); 82. "Hardship All Around" (苦難すべての周り, "Kunan Subete no Mawari"); 83. "Sleeping Beauty" (眠れる森の美女, "Nemureru Mori no Bijo"); 84. "Kitty's Hope and Despair" (キティの希望と絶望, "Kiti no Kibō to Zetsubō"); 85. "Through All Those Years, I Still Wanted To See You" (何年過ぎても会いたかった, "Nannen Sugite mo Aitakatta")
9	December 17, 2015	978-4-06-395563-7	November 8, 2016	978-1-63236-308-4
86. "Getting Smaller and Farther Away" (縮まったり遠のいたり, "Chijimattari Tōnoitari"); 87. "To Keep a Promise" (約束を果たすため, "Yakusoku o Hatasu Tame"); 88. "Kirie's Power Explodes" (キリヱの能力、炸裂, "Kirie no Nōryoku, Sakuretsu"); 89. "How to Defeat a Too-Powerful Foe" (強すぎる敵の倒し方, "Tsuyosugiru Teki no Taoshi-kata"); 90. "The Fruits of his Training" (修行の成果, "Shugyō no Seika"); 91. "Out of the Frying Pan, Into the Fire" (一難倒して、また一難, "Ichinan Taoshite, Mata Ichinan"); 92. "A Shocking Reunion" (驚きの再会, "Odoroki no Saikai"); 93. "If we had met in the Past" (過去で会えたら, "Kako de Aetara"); 94. "Chasing a Shadow" (追い求める影, "Oimotomeru Kage"); 95. "Something Hectic this way Comes" (騒がしさがやって来る, "Sawagashisa ga Yattekuru"); 96. "Touta's Shout" (刀太の叫び, "Tōta no Sakebi")
10	March 17, 2016	978-4-06-395620-7	March 14, 2017	978-1-63236-353-4
97. "Unexpected Guest" (突然のお客様, "Totsuzen no Okyaku-sama"); 98. "Be our Guest!" (いらっしゃいませ、お客様, "Irasshaimase, Okyaku-sama"); 99. "Battle of Passion, Battle of Fury" (熱戦・激戦, "Nessen - Gekisen"); 100. "Intimate Exchange" (裸の突き合い, "Hadaka no Tsukiai"); 101. "Kuromaru-kun's Cares" (九郎丸くんの苦労, "Kurōmaru-kun no Kurō"); 102. "Dolled up Kuromaru Goes on a Date" (女装九郎丸、デートする, "Josō Kurōmaru, Dēto suru"); 103. "Do I Want to Protect? Or be Protected?" (守りたい？ 守られたい？, "Mamoritai? Mamoraretai?"); 104. "Never let Your Guard Down or Freak out" (焦りと油断、禁物, "Aseri to Yudan, Kinmotsu"); 105. "Time Freeze for Two" (時間停止で２人きり, "Jikan Teishi de Futari kiri"); 106. "Sleep With Me" (一緒に寝て, "Issho ni Nete"); 107. "Allow me to Say One Thing" (一言申す, "Hitokoto Mousu")
11	July 15, 2016	978-4-06-395712-9	July 25, 2017	978-1-63236-444-9
108. "Enter The Lady-Killer" (チャラ男出現, "Chara-o Shutsugen"); 109. "The Dangers of Honesty" (素直は危険, "Sunao na Kiken"); 110. "Yukihime's Confession" (雪姫の告白, "Yukihime no Kokuhaku"); 111. "Gathering for the Mahora Martial Arts Tournament" (まほら武道会会場入り, "Mahora Budōkai Kaijō-iri"); 112. "The Students of Mahora Academy Class 3-A" (麻帆良学園３－Ａの生徒達, "Mahora Gakuen 3-A Seito-tachi"); 113. "Let's go With the Forceful Method" (強引にいきましょう, "Gōin ni Ikimashō"); 114. "For Negi" (ネギのために, "Negi no Tame ni"); 115. "Brain Function Stops, Everything Stops" (思考停止。色々停止, "Jikō Teishi, Iroiro Teishi"); 116. "Solution" (解決法, "Kaiketsuhō"); 117. "You Activate It By." (発動条件は。, "Hatsudō Jōken wa."); 118. "The Face of the Enemy" (敵方の正体, "Tekigata no Shōtai")
12	November 17, 2016	978-4-06-395801-0	November 14, 2017	978-1-63236-578-1
119. "Touta and Kirie: Will They or Won't They?" (刀太とキリヱはどっちなの？, "Tōta to Kirie wa Docchi na no?"); 120. "Speeder Three-Way" (スピーダーで三つ巴, "Supīdā de Mitsu-domoe"); 121. "Racing Without a Stitch" (スピーダーですぽぽぽん, "Supīdā desu Popopon"); 122. "Because you are Mizore's Beloved!" (みぞれの想い人ですもの！, "Mizore no Omoi Hito desu mono!"); 123. "The Three Tota's Wishes!" (三つの刀太の願い！, "Mittsu no Tōta no Negai!"); 124. "That's how it's Done!!" (そうやって決まります！！, "Sou Yatte Kimarimasu!!"); 125. "Time Manipulator Cutlass" (時間停止能力者・カトラス, "Jikan Teishi Nōryoku-sha - Katorasu"); 126. "It All Begins" (すべては始まり, "Subete wa Hajimari"); 127. "It's Good to see you Again" (お久しぶりです, "O-Hisashiburi desu"); 128. "We Are UQ HOLDER!" (我ら UQ HOLDER!, "Warera Yūkyū Horudā")
13	April 7, 2017	978-4-06-395908-6	March 13, 2018	978-1-63236-579-8
129. "Tota and Negi" (刀太とネギ, "Tōta to Negi"); 130. "Underhanded Assault" (卑劣な攻撃, "Hiretsu na Kōgeki"); 131. "The Wish and Plan of the Imperial Princess" (姫御子の願いと策, "Himiko no Negai to Saku"); 132. "Operation: Rescue Negi" (ネギ救出作戦, "Negi Kyūshutsu Sakusen")
14	September 8, 2017	978-4-06-510179-7; ISBN 978-4-06-397034-0 (limited edition)	July 31, 2018	978-1-63236-629-0
133. "The Long 37 Seconds" (長き37秒, "Nagaki 37-byō"); 134. "It's Good to See You Again" (久しぶり, "Hisashiburi"); 135. "Jinbei's Power Explosion Panic!" (甚兵衛の能力炸裂パニック！, "Jinbee no Nōryoku Sakuretsu Panikku!"); 136. "Climb the Stairway to Adulthood!" (オトナの階段を駆け上がれ, "Otona no Kaidan o Kakeagare")
15	November 9, 2017	978-4-06-510380-7	November 20, 2018	978-1-63236-689-4
137. "The Decision Made That Day" (あの日の決意, "Ano Hi no Ketsui"); 138. "Life or Death Love Confession" (決死の告白, "Kesshi no Kokuhaku"); 139. "Father Son Reunion" (父と息子の邂逅, "Chichi to Musuko no Kaigō"); 140. "The Showdown Against Ialda" (ヨルダとの決着, "Yoruda no Kecchaku")
16	March 9, 2018	978-4-06-511061-4	March 19, 2019	978-1-63236-737-2
141. "Toward Our Dreams" (夢に向かって, "Yume ni Mukatte"); 142. "Born From Hate" (憎しみから生まれたもの, "Nikushimi kara Umareta Mono"); 143. "With Superhuman Power" (人間以上の力をもって, "Ningen Ijō no Chikara o Motte"); 144. "Operation Rescue 10,000" (１万人救出作戦, "Ichiman-nin Kyūshutsu Sakusen")
17	June 8, 2018	978-4-06-511572-5; ISBN 978-4-06-397036-4 (limited edition)	July 30, 2019	978-1-63236-802-7
145. "The Million or the Thousand? Or Kirie?" (百万人か。千人か。キリヱか。, "Hyakuman-nin ka. Sen-nin ka. Kirie ka."); 146. "Roll Out the Extra Lives" (命の残機、放出, "Inochi no Zanki, Hōshutsu"); 147. "Memory" (メモリー, "Memorī"); 148. "Where the Path of Destiny Diverges" (運命の分かれ道, "Unmei no Wakare Michi")
18	October 9, 2018	978-4-06-512985-2	November 26, 2019	978-1-63236-858-4
149. "And the Hero Who Saves the World" (世界を救う英雄は, "Sekai o Sukuu Eiyū wa"); 150. "Choice is Where Paths Diverge" (選択とは、分かれ道, "Sentaku to wa, Wakare Michi"); 151. "I Confess" (告白します, "Kokuhakushimasu"); 152. "The Love of God" (神の愛, "Kami no Ai")
19	February 8, 2019	978-4-06-513866-3	March 31, 2020	978-1-63236-928-4
153. "The Mages" (魔法使い共, "Mahōtsukai-domo"); 154. "The Road to the Birth of the Demon Queen" (魔王誕生の軌跡, "Maō Tanjō no Kiseki"); 155. "A Battle of Wills Against Gods" (神と意地の張り合い, "Kami to Iji no Hariai"); 156. "The Long, Long Three Hours" (永い永い３時間, "Nagai Nagai 3-jikan")
20	June 7, 2019	978-4-06-515302-4	October 27, 2020	978-1-63236-978-9
157. "The First Target" (最初の獲物(ターゲット), "Saisho no Tāgetto"); 158. "Number 8" (ナンバー８, "Nanbā 8"); 159. "The Trick To The Trump Card" (切り札の正体(タネ), "Kirifuda no Tane"); 160. "UQ Holder Vs. UQ Holder" (UQホルダーvs.UQホルダー, "UQ Horudā vs. UQ Horudā")
21	October 9, 2019	978-4-06-517154-7	December 15, 2020	978-1-64651-076-4
161. "The Limit of his Strength" (強さの底, "Tsuyosa no Soko"); 162. "Switcheroo" (イレカエ, "Irekae"); 163. "Fellow Immortals" (不死人同士, "Fushibito Dōshi"); 164. "Assemble" (結集, "Kesshū")
22	February 7, 2020	978-4-06-518165-2	June 29, 2021	978-1-64651-170-9
165. "For the Love of Humanity" (人間が好き, "Ningen ga Suki"); 166. "Celebration" (祝杯, "Shukuhai"); 167. "New Ostia" (新オスティア, "Shin Osutia"); 168. "The Shape of Happiness" (幸せのかたち, "Shiawase no Katachi")
23	July 9, 2020	978-4-06-519302-0	September 28, 2021	978-1-64651-235-5
169. "The Fushi-Gari: Immortal Hunters" (不死狩り, "Fushigari"); 170. "Immortal Purge" (不死祓い, "Fushi-barai"); 171. "Immortal Monster" (不死の怪物, "Fushi no Kaibutsu"); 172. "The Divine Blade of the Fushi-Gari" (不死狩りの神刀, "Fushigari no Shintō")
24	November 9, 2020	978-4-06-521109-0	November 30, 2021	978-1-64651-309-3
173. "Training from Hell" (地獄の特訓, "Jigoku no Tokkun"); 174. "Mizore and Shinobu" (みぞれとしのぶ, "Mizore to Shinobu"); 175. "2131" (2131年, "2131-nen"); 176. "Pain" (痛み, "Itami")
25	March 9, 2021	978-4-06-522658-2	March 29, 2022	978-1-64651-430-4
177. "The Last One" (最後の一人, Saigo no Hitori); 178. "40 Years Late" (40年の遅刻, 40-nen no Chikoku); 179. "The Akashic Skywheel" (アカシャの天輪, Akasha no Tenwa); 180. "Reunion" (再会, Saikai)
26	July 9, 2021	978-4-06-524005-2	July 26, 2022	978-1-64651-431-1
181. "What Really Happened 45 Years Ago" (45年前の真相, 45-Nen Mae no Shinsō); 182. "At the End of the Void" (虚空の果て, Kokū no Hate); 183. "The Battle of Mahora Academy" (麻帆良学園の闘い, Mahoragakuen no Tatakai); 184. "What Happened to Kirie" (キリエの場合, Kirie no Baai)
27	November 9, 2021	978-4-06-525939-9	December 6, 2022	978-1-64651-612-4
185. "Commencing Operation" (作戦決行, Sakusen Kekkō); 186. "Gengoro's World Line" (ゲンゴロウの世界線, Gengorō no Sekai-sen); 187. "Cosmo Entelekheia" (完全なる世界, Kanzen'naru Sekai); 188. "What I Wanted To See" (見たかった景色, Mitakatta Keshiki)
28	March 9, 2022	978-4-06-527262-6	March 21, 2023	978-1-64651-681-0
189. "Cosmo Entelekheia" (完全なる世界(コズモエンテレケイア), Kanzen'naru Sekai); 190. "The Final Battle" (最終決戦, Saishū Kessen); 191. "To Tomorrow" (明日へ, Ashita e); 192. "Across Time and Space" (時空を超えて, Jikū o Koete)
