= Danchi Tomoo =

Japanese manga series

団地ともお
- Genre: Comedy
- Manga
- Written by: Tobira Oda
- Published by: Shogakukan
- Imprint: Big Comic
- Magazine: Big Comic Spirits
- Original run: 2003 – February 4, 2019
- Volumes: 32
- Anime television series
- Directed by: Ayumu Watanabe
- Written by: Takashi Yamada
- Music by: Tomoki Hasegawa
- Studio: Shogakukan Music & Digital Entertainment
- Original network: NHK-G
- Original run: April 6, 2013 – February 7, 2015
- Episodes: 78

Danchi Tomoo (団地ともお; "Apartment Complex Tomoo") is a Japanese manga series written and illustrated by Tobira Oda. An anime adaptation was announced in January 2013 and ran between April 2013 and February 2015.

== Plot ==
Danchi Tomoo stars elementary school student Tomoo Kinoshita who lives in the mammoth Edajima Apartment Complex in Building #29 with his mother Tetsuko and sister Kimiko, while his father Tetsuo lives in an apartment in the city. While full of surreal gags, Danchi Tomoo also shows the real emotions of the Kinoshita family and their friends, neighbors, and classmates.

== Characters ==
=== Kinoshita family ===
Tomoo Kinoshita (木下 友夫, Kinoshita Tomoo)
Voiced by: Yūko Sanpei
A fourth-grade student who excels at sports but not at his studies, and always seems to get in trouble. However, he longs to be responsible and often surprises those around him when he displays his big-hearted personality.
Tetsuko Kinoshita (木下 哲子, Kinoshita Tetsuko)
Voiced by: Chika Sakamoto
Tomoo and Kimiko's mother. She works part time at the neighborhood supermarket to make ends meet. She claims she once was as beautiful as her daughter, but in her middle age she has gained a significant amount of weight and often tries new exercise equipment to lose it.
Tetsuo Kinoshita (木下 鉄雄, Kinoshita Tetsuo)
Voiced by: Kentaro Tone
Tomoo and Kimiko's father. He does not live with his wife and children, but instead in a bachelor's apartment in nearby Egi Town for work. Despite living apart, Tomoo dearly loves his father, and he loves his family by putting a photo of them above where he sleeps. Neither the reader of the manga nor the viewer of the anime ever get to see Tetsuo's face.
Kimiko Kinoshita (木下 君子, Kinoshita Kimiko)
Voiced by: Yui Makino
Tomoo's older sister who is in her second year of middle school. She is part of her school's biology club and longs to have her own bedroom. At one point she begins a journal trade with another person, unaware that it is actually Tomoo's friend Mitsuo.
Grandpa (じいちゃん, Jiichan)
Voiced by: Kenichi Ogata
Tetsuo's father who lives in nearby Edajima Town. He is particularly good at making mochi and whenever he tries to give advice, he thinks of what his wife used to say.
Grandma (ばあちゃん, Baachan)
Voiced by: Mari Yokoo
Tetsuo's mother who died before the series began. Whenever Grandpa wants to give advice, he remembers what Grandma told him.

=== Tomoo's friends, classmates, and neighbors ===
Masato Yoshimoto (吉本 雅人, Yoshimoto Masato)
Voiced by: Mutsumi Tamura
Tomoo's classmate and neighbor in Building #24. He is an honor student who also wants to try his hand at cooking.
Yoshinobu Yoshida (吉田 由伸, Yoshida Yoshinobu)
Voiced by: Hana Takeda
Tomoo's classmate and neighbor in Building #20. He is also a poor student like Tomoo, and he secretly longs for his neighbor Tomoko.
Mitsuo Kikukawa (菊川 みつお, Kikukawa Mitsuo)
Voiced by: Hitomi Nabatame
Tomoo's classmate and neighbor in Building #3. He and Tomoo do not get along very well because of his bookish nature and also enjoys astronomy. He begins a journal trading with Kimiko, who is unaware that she is sharing her secrets with one of Tomoo's classmates.
Keiko Kamakura (鎌倉 景子, Kamakura Keiko)
Voiced by: Atsumi Fujimura
Tomoo's classmate and neighbor in Building #31. She is a tomboy, and often has to playfully fight the boys to get them to stop acting badly. She has a straightforward personality and obsessed with food.
Keiko's mother
Voiced by: Hiro Nakajima
She often dotes on her daughter, but does punish her when Keiko accidentally ruins one of Sakagami's books.
Yoriko Hayama (葉山 より子, Hayama Yoriko)
Voiced by: Kasumi Hitosugi
Tomoo's classmate and neighbor in Building #22. She and Keiko are good friends. She is an honor student and also has to help take care of her baby sister, but she feels stifled by her place and Keiko tries to break her out of it.
Yukio Nezu (根津 ユキオ, Nezu Yukio)
Voiced by: Asako
A boy from another classroom and neighbor in Building #3. He and Tomoo have a friendly rivalry.
Setsuko Tachibana (立花 節子, Tachibana Setsuko)
Voiced by: Kana Uetake
Tomoo's classmate and neighbor, often called Chairman (委員長, Iinchō) because of how she takes lead in the class activities. She is not a morning person because she is part of an active online train enthusiast community.
Fukuzawa (福沢) and Fukuoka (福岡)
Voiced by: Yumiko Kobayashi and Aimi Tanaka
Two of Setsuko's friends who the boys are enamoured with.
Masayuki Sayama (佐山 真雪, Sayama Masayuki)
Voiced by: Hiro Nakajima
A grade six student who lives in Building #10 who is trying to become the student body president. He has a twin sister named Mari (真理) who is his polar opposite.
Hasumi-chan (ハスミちゃん)
Voiced by: Emiri Katō
A girl from the nearby Narumachi Heights neighborhood who Tomoo befriends over playing soccer.
Mako-chan (まこちゃん)
Voiced by: Saori Hayami
Hasumi's friend who tries to make Tomoo only her friend because of a misplaced jealousy from a past fight with Hasumi.
Yuri Maki (真木 ゆり, Maki Yuri)
Voiced by: Kokoro Kikuchi
Kimiko's friend and classmate from Building #28. When they were in grade four, she was involved in a traffic accident that left her comatose. She often appears in spirit or in flashbacks to Kimiko and Tomoo.

=== Others ===
Sakagami (坂上)
Voiced by: Mamiko Noto
An 18-year-old girl who lives near the Edajima Apartments, but because of her difficulty in walking she does not attend school as much and has been held back two years. Regardless, she is well versed in the humanities and even some science. She communicates with Tomoo (and Keiko) by smoke signals and firecrackers whenever she needs help. She is also friends with Aoto.
Hidemi Aoto (青戸 秀美, Aoto Hidemi)
Voiced by: Kana Uetake
A year three high school student who lives in Building #10. She is always studying in order to pass the graduation exam and in her free time practices with a yo-yo. She often loses her temper.
Yūji Konno (今野 裕二, Konno Yūji)
Voiced by: Hitoshi Yanai
A college student who lives in Building #2 and works in the local convenience store Tanishi Mart. For this reason, the children of the apartment complex all affectionately call him "Conveni Bro" (コンビニの兄ちゃん, Konbini no Niichan). He will gladly perform errands for their parents. After his father died, he and his brother Hachirō (八郎) inherited some money, and Hachirō decided to travel around the world, leaving Yūji by himself.
Convenience Store Manager (コンビニの店長, Konbini no Tenchō)
Voiced by: Nobuaki Kanemitsu
Yūji's boss who is a muscular bespectacled man.
Shimada (島田)
Voiced by: Katsumi Chō
The head of the Edajima residents' association who lives in Building #29. While he seems like a gruff old man, nagging the ladies of the community to keep things clean, he is actually very sweet towards children.
Toshizō Kashino (樫野 年三, Kashino Toshizō)
Voiced by: Shigeru Chiba
An 89-year-old man who lives in Building #5. He never seems to do anything.
Ikue Honda (本田 育江, Honda Ikue)
Voiced by: Asami Yano
Tomoo's elementary school teacher. She was apparently a wild child in junior high until her teacher made her change her ways. She often went to him for advice until he died, forcing her to try to learn how to be a better teacher on her own.
Ikue Honda's former teacher
Voiced by: Unshō Ishizuka
He was Ms. Honda's junior high teacher who helped her when she became a teacher, until he died.
Hazama (間公文)
Voiced by: Ben Hiura
A retired man whose first name no one is quite sure how to read, and who may once have been a judge. He lives in Building #22 and often confounds the housewives.
Tsuyoshi Akita (沖田 つよし, Akita Tsuyoshi)
Voiced by: Eiji Miyashita
Kimiko's classmate who is quiet and clumsy. He always seems to avoid going home, making several lunches and eating out as much as possible. This is because his father is abusive and is mother is an alcoholic. The children of the Edajima Apartment Complex call him Mister Geek (ガリベン君, Gariben-kun).
Tomiko Anada (穴田 とみ子, Anada Tomiko)
Voiced by: Hiro Nakajima
One of Kimiko's classmates who lives in Building #3. It is rumored that she has a pet anaconda because a large snake was seen following her home while she was playing the recorder once. She is part of the school's tennis club.
Toshiya Arama (阿羅間 年也, Arama Toshiya)
Voiced by: Nobuaki Kanemitsu
A professional baseball player who lives in the apartment complex who Tomoo and Yoshimoto look up to, as he played with Tomoo's favorite player Catherine (カトリーヌ, Katorīnu).

=== Non-human characters ===
Me, the Crow Who Does Not Tire of Humans (人間に対し興味の尽きないカラス オレ, Ningen ni Taishi Kyōmi no Tsukinai Karasu Ore)
Voiced by: Hiroki Tōchi
A crow that lives in the woods near the apartment complex. He seems to be able to understand human gestures and words.
Conveni (コンビニ, Konbini)
Voiced by: Eiji Miyashita
A crow that also was interested in humanity, but gorged himself at the convenience store. He is hit by a truck and dies.
Old Man (おっさん, Ossan)
A crow that is deeply interested in human writing, particularly if the writer is bald.
Ashinaga (アシナガ)
A crow that managed to steal bait from one of the traps around the complex many times, until his luck ran out.
The Cram School Ghost (受験生の幽霊, Jukensei no Yūrei)
The ghost of a boy who hanged himself before taking the final examinations. Aoto encounters him, and his ghost cat who died after being abandoned and trying to eat the crows killed by the pest control, when staying at an inn before she takes her exams.
Chibi (チビ)
A cat who followed its owner 100 kilometers away from Hakone, only to collapse in the Edajima Apartment Complex. It prepares to die, but is saved by the apartment complex people and is ultimately reunited with its owner, only to be abandoned again, and decide to live in the apartment complex.

=== Fictional characters ===
Colonel Sports (スポーツ大佐, Supōtsu Taisa)
Voiced by: Hidetoshi Nakamura
The main character of Tomoo's favorite anime. In the show-within-a-show, he is a cyborg who gets into violent fights.
Crow (カラス, Karasu)
A clumsy crow who is Colonel Sports' sidekick.
Bear (クマ, Kuma)
Voiced by: Nobuaki Kanemitsu
A bear who follows Colonel Sports and Crow around.
Professor Dog (イヌ先生, Inu-sensei)
Voiced by: Kōtarō Nishiyama
Colonel Sports' math teacher.
Paul (ポール, Pōru)
Voiced by: Hōchū Ōtsuka
The Colonel's mentor and godfather who actually killed the Colonel's family, leading to Paul being beheaded.

== Media ==
=== Manga ===
Written and illustrated by Tobira Oda, the Danchi Tomoo manga began serialization in Shogakukan's Big Comic Spirits in 2003, and finished on February 4, 2019. The chapters are collected into tankōbon volumes, which have been published under Shogakukan's Big Comics imprint, since February 28, 2004.

=== Anime ===
A cel shaded CGI anime adaptation of Danchi Tomoo, produced by NHK Enterprises and Shogakukan Music & Digital Entertainment, aired on NHK-G from April 6, 2013, to February 7, 2015, for a total of 78 episodes. The first season was aired from April 6, 2013, to February 1, 2014, while the second season was aired from April 12, 2014, to February 7, 2015. Ayumu Watanabe served as director, Takashi Yamada handled the series composition, Tomoki Hasegawa composed the music, and Man Kuwabata designed the characters.

The opening theme for the whole series is Danchi de DAN! RAN! (団地でDAN! RAN!) by Mongol800. The ending theme for episodes 1 through 20 is Start Line! (スタートライン!) by Sonar Pocket. The ending theme for episodes 21 through 39 is Super Smiler (スーパスマイラー) by LIFriends. The ending theme for episodes 40 through 52 is Akane (アカネ) by a flood of circle. The ending theme for episodes 53 through 65 is Friends! Friends! (フレンズ!フレンズ!) by Rico Sasaki. The ending theme for episodes 66 through 78 is Futari de Arukeba (ふたりで歩けば) by Masanori Shimada.

The 1st series has been released on DVD across 13 volumes by Pony Canyon. The same set of episodes is available for streaming on U-NEXT.

== Episode list ==
=== Season 1 ===
No.	Title	Original release date
1	Transliteration: "Haruyasumi no Keikaku-hyō o Tsukuru Tomoo / Haruyasumi no Naraigoto o Sagasu Tomoo" (Japanese: 春休みの計画表を作るともお / 春休みの習い事を探すともお)	April 6, 2013
2	Transliteration: "Danchi de Boku to Akushu da Tomoo / Hana yori Danchi desu yo Tomoo" (Japanese: 団地で僕と握手だともお / 花より団地ですよともお)	April 13, 2013
3	Transliteration: "Rusuban o Katte Deru Tomoo / Nakayoki koto wa Utsukushī no ka na Tomoo" (Japanese: 留守番を買って出るともお / 仲良きことは美しいのかなともお)	April 20, 2013
4	Transliteration: "Renkyū ni shite Chichi o Omou Tomoo / Ano Saka o Nobotteiku Tomoo" (Japanese: 連休にして父を想うともお / あの坂を登っていくともお)	April 27, 2013
5	Transliteration: "Ōkoku Kensetsu o Mokuromu Tomoo / Kame no Kō yori Toshi no Kō da yo Tomoo" (Japanese: 王国建設をもくろむともお / 亀の甲より年の功だよともお)	May 11, 2013
6	Transliteration: "Negoto ni Kotaeru na Tomoo / Danchi de Heya o Getto da Tomoo" (Japanese: 寝言に答えるなともお / 団地で部屋をゲットだともお)	May 18, 2013
7	Transliteration: "Dengon Gēmu ni Odora sareru Tomoo / Kiseki o Shinjiru kai Tomoo" (Japanese: 伝言ゲームに踊らされるともお / 奇跡を信じるかいともお)	May 25, 2013
8	Transliteration: "Mezase Hai Sukoa da Tomoo / Kako o Kaima Michau zo Tomoo" (Japanese: 目指せハイスコアだともお / 過去を垣間見ちゃうぞともお)	June 1, 2013
9	Transliteration: "Kodomo Damashide Ī janai Tomoo / Kyūpiddo wa Dekiru no ka yo Tomoo" (Japanese: 子供だましでいいじゃないともお / キューピッドはできるのかよともお)	June 8, 2013
10	Transliteration: "Keikaku-sei ga Nakute mo Ī no ka Tomoo / Joshi Kōkōsei no Denshobato da ne Tomoo" (Japanese: 計画性がなくてもいいのかともお / 女子高校生の伝書鳩だねともお)	June 15, 2013
11	Transliteration: "Nannara Yokobareru darou ka Tomoo / Nanji no Rinjin ga Raibaru da ze Tomoo" (Japanese: 何なら喜ばれるんだろうかともお / 汝の隣人がライバルだぜともお)	June 22, 2013
12	Transliteration: "Saikyō no Norimono ni Natteyaru Tomoo / Dōtoku o Amaku Miru na yo Tomoo" (Japanese: 最強の乗り物になってやるともお / 道徳を甘く見るなよともお)	June 29, 2013
13	Transliteration: "Hiraga Gennai da ze Tomoo / Kāsan Datte Naību da zo Tomoo" (Japanese: 平賀源内だぜともお / 母さんだってナイーブだぞともお)	July 6, 2013
14	Transliteration: "Ame ni Utaeba Unzari da ze Tomoo / Mākushīto wa Kuroku Nure Tomoo" (Japanese: 雨に唄えばうんざりだぜともお / マークシートは黒く塗れともお)	July 13, 2013
15	Transliteration: "Kokuban Nanka Fuki Makure Tomoo / Hicchikokku na Natsu da ze Tomoo" (Japanese: 黒板なんか拭きまくれともお / ヒッチコックな夏だぜともお)	July 20, 2013
16	Transliteration: "Tōsan o Shōkan surun da Tomoo / Yūrakuchō de Aimashō Tomoo" (Japanese: 父さんを召喚するんだともお / 有楽町で会いましょうともお)	July 27, 2013
17	Transliteration: "Kazoku no Naka o Tori Motsun da Tomoo / Nanika Utsutteru zo Tomoo" (Japanese: 家族の仲を取り持つんだともお / 何か写ってるぞともお)	August 3, 2013
18	Transliteration: "Omae wa Jidai ni Nagasareteike Tomoo / Osanai Jimi wa Genki kai Tomoo" (Japanese: お前は時代に流されていけともお / 幼なじみは元気かいともお)	August 24, 2013
19	Transliteration: "Natsu no Kiroku ni Idomu Tomoo / Kittobu Toberu Hazuda Tomoo" (Japanese: 夏の記録に挑むともお / きっと飛べるはずだともお)	August 31, 2013
20	Transliteration: "Danchi wa Muhō Chitai da ze Tomoo / Sukusuku Sodatteru Tomoo" (Japanese: 団地は無法地帯だぜともお / すくすく育ってるともお)	September 7, 2013
21	Transliteration: "Meikyū o Nukedase Tomoo / Suzushigedaro Tomoo" (Japanese: 迷宮を抜け出せともお / すずしげだろともお)	September 14, 2013
22	Transliteration: "Sekai no Himitsu o Mitsuketa zo Tomoo / Nanbāwan Demo Onrīwan Demo nai na Tomoo" (Japanese: 世界の秘密を見つけたぞともお / ナンバーワンでもオンリーワンでもないなともお)	September 21, 2013
23	Transliteration: "Shisutemu mo Daiji da na Tomoo / Bibibi...da na Tomoo" (Japanese: システムも大事だなともお / ビビビ…だなともお)	September 28, 2013
24	Transliteration: "Obāchan de Fukurokouji da Tomoo / Fureau Notte Muzukashī ne Tomoo" (Japanese: お婆ちゃんで袋小路だともお / ふれ合うのって難しいねともお)	October 5, 2013
25	Transliteration: "San-Kumi no Meiyo o Mamoru Tomoo / Roku mo Nana mo Kitto aru ze Tomoo" (Japanese: 3組の名誉を守るともお / 6も7もきっとあるぜともお)	October 12, 2013
26	Transliteration: "Kuizu, Haya Oshi desu Tomoo / Tōsan to Hashiritai nda Tomoo" (Japanese: クイズ、早押しですともお / 父さんと走りたいんだともお)	October 19, 2013
27	Transliteration: "Hima o Mote Amashima Kuru Tomoo / Tān to Otabe Tomoo" (Japanese: ヒマをもてあましまくるともお / たーんとお食べともお)	October 26, 2013
28	Transliteration: "Ore no Namae o Itte Miro Tomoo / Banto de Hōmuran da ze Tomoo" (Japanese: オレの名前を言ってみろともお / バントでホームランだぜともお)	November 2, 2013
29	Transliteration: "Te ni Shoku tsukete Antai da Tomoo / Nēchan no Seikatsu mo Mitai zo Tomoo" (Japanese: 手に職つけて安泰だともお / 姉ちゃんの生活もみたいぞともお)	November 9, 2013
30	Transliteration: "Harapeko yori Daijida ze Tomoo / Waraiji ni Saseru Ki ka yo" (Japanese: ハラペコより大事だぜともお / 笑い死にさせる気かよともお)	November 16, 2013
31	Transliteration: "Anzen o Tada de Kaimasu Tomoo / Danshi to Joshi to Toire na Tomoo" (Japanese: 安全をタダで買いますともお / 男子と女子とトイレなともお)	November 23, 2013
32	Transliteration: "Mamori Mamorare Ikiteiku Tomoo / Premia Kan o Dashite Ikou ka Tomoo" (Japanese: 守り守られ生きていくともお / プレミア感を出していこうかともお)	November 30, 2013
33	Transliteration: "Utsushicha Dame da yo Tomoo / Kenka no Genin wa Nannan da Tomoo" (Japanese: うつしちゃダメだよともお / ケンカの原因はなんなんだともお)	December 7, 2013
34	Transliteration: "Ohoshi-sama ni Onegai Tomoo / Tōza no Mokuhyō ga Daiji da ze Tomoo" (Japanese: お星さまにお願いともお / 当座の目標が大事だぜともお)	December 14, 2013
35	Transliteration: "Santa-san to Shinrisen da Tomoo / Soko de Nani ga Mierun da Tomoo" (Japanese: サンタさんと心理戦だともお / そこで何が見えるんだともお)	December 21, 2013
36	Transliteration: "Neshōgatsu Datte Shiawase da ne Tomoo / Yoso no Ko ni Nacchai nasai Tomoo" (Japanese: 寝正月だって幸せだねともお / よその子になっちゃいなさいともお)	January 11, 2014
37	Transliteration: "Katsu to Kabuto no Cho wa Shimaru no ka na Tomoo / Michi to no Saikai Datteba Tomoo" (Japanese: 勝つとかぶとの緒は締まるのかなともお / 未知との再会だってばともお)	January 18, 2014
38	Transliteration: "Kurabu Katsudō wa Hirune no Jikan janai zo Tomoo / Neko wa Ugoku kara Chūishiro Tomoo" (Japanese: クラブ活動は昼寝の時間じゃないぞともお / 猫は動くから注意しろともお)	January 25, 2014
39	Transliteration: "Kanshin no Teki da na Tomoo / Meguri Yuku Tomoo" (Japanese: 関心の的だなともお / 巡りゆくともお)	February 1, 2014

=== Season 2 ===
No.	Title	Original release date
40	Transliteration: "Kaze Makase da yo Tomoo / Kōkai wa Sakini Tatan zo Tomoo" (Japanese: 風まかせだよなともお /後悔は先に立たんぞともお)	April 12, 2014
41	Transliteration: "Roman no Kamisama Arigatou Tomoo / Dandori wa Daiji da na Tomoo" (Japanese: ロマンの神様ありがとうともお / 段取りは大事だなともお)	April 19, 2014
42	Transliteration: "Toppu Rannā nado Kantan da na Tomoo / Sore wa Dare no Shiwaza da? Tomoo / Hana yori Dango no Danchikko da Tomoo" (Japanese: トップランナーなど簡単だなともお / それは誰の仕業だ？ともお / 花より団子の団地っ子だともお)	April 26, 2014
43	Transliteration: "Kono Bosu ni Tsuite Ikou Tomoo / Choi Waru ka yo Tomoo" (Japanese: このボスについていこうともお / ちょいワルかよともお)	May 3, 2014
44	Transliteration: "Undōkai de Kami ni Nare Tomoo / Asa Okite Hirune shite Yoru Nero Tomoo" (Japanese: 運動会で神になれともお / 朝起きて昼寝して夜寝ろともお)	May 10, 2014
45	Transliteration: "Kai Itakatta Dēsu da yo na Tomoo / Kokku-san wa Kunisan janai zo Tomoo / Ima-gō yori Shin Tenkai da ze Tomoo" (Japanese: 会イタカッタデースだよなともお / コックさんは国算じゃないぞともお / 今号より新展開だぜともお)	May 17, 2014
46	Transliteration: "Joshi o Furimuka Setai ze Tomoo / Yakusokutte Ittai Nandakke Tomoo" (Japanese: 女子を振り向かせたいぜともお / 約束って一体なんだっけともお)	May 24, 2014
47	Transliteration: "Kawaii ko ni wa Hitori Tabi da na Tomoo / Gun de Kanzenshiai da Tomoo" (Japanese: かわいい子には一人旅だなとも / 軍で完全試合だともお)	May 31, 2014
48	Transliteration: "Nemuranu Mori no Tomoo / Fasshon Rīdātte Dare? Tomoo / Shihai kara no Dasshutsu wa Naru ka Tomoo" (Japanese: 眠らぬ森のともお / ファッションリーダーって誰？ともお / 支配からの脱出は成るかともお)	June 7, 2014
49	Transliteration: "Nori Koeteiku no da Tomoo / Mada Tsudzuiteiru na Tomoo" (Japanese: 乗り越えていくのだともお / まだ続いているなともお)	June 14, 2014
50	Transliteration: "Omoidesenai yo Tomoo / Ika no Mondai ni Kotae na yo Tomoo" (Japanese: 思い出せないよともお / 以下の問題に答えなよともお)	June 21, 2014
51	Transliteration: "Abaka Reshi Torie da yo Tomoo / Umaku Hagemashita ka na Tomoo / Katadzukete Seikan da Tomoo" (Japanese: 暴かれし取り柄だよともお / うまく励ましたかなともお / 片づけて生還だともお)	June 28, 2014
52	Transliteration: "Sono Mune ni Yume ga aru kara sa Tomoo / Mada Machigaeteta no ka yo Tomoo" (Japanese: その胸に夢があるからさともお / まだ間違えてたのかよともお)	July 5, 2014
53	Transliteration: "Tomoo to Kinoshita to Tomoo / De, Akai no wa Nananda Tomoo" (Japanese: トモオとキノシタとともお / で、赤いのは何なんだともお)	July 12, 2014
54	Transliteration: "Kinoshita-ka no Shoku no Rūru wa Kibishī ka Tomoo / Mukashi wa kimi mo Wakakatta ne Taisa Tomoo / Otentosama ga Miterun da ze Tomoo" (Japanese: 木下家の食のルールは厳しいかともお / 昔は君も若かったね大佐 / お天道様が見てるんだぜともお)	July 19, 2014
55	Transliteration: "Shin Shirīzu de Zetsubō da ze Tomoo / Kyōsō-ritsu ga Takai na Tomoo" (Japanese: 新シリーズで絶望だぜともお / 競争率が高いなともお)	July 26, 2014
56	Transliteration: "Saikō no Jikan da na Tomoo / Gatsun to Itte Yare yo Tomoo" (Japanese: 最高の時間だなともお / ガツンと言ってやれよともお)	August 2, 2014
57	Transliteration: "Kokō no Hito ni Nareru ka na Tomoo / Sonna ni Miraretemo naa Tomoo / Kusaimeshi o Kuu Tomoo" (Japanese: 孤高の人になれるかなともお / そんなに見られてもなぁともお / クサいメシを食うともお)	August 23, 2014
58	Transliteration: "Ato no Kānibaru da yo Tomoo / Nanjū Supai Nanda yo Tomoo" (Japanese: 後のカーニバルだよともお / 何重スパイなんだよともお)	August 30, 2014
59	Transliteration: "Ichi-en no Omomi o Omoishiru ka Tomoo / Sono Kane o Narasu no wa Dare da Tomoo / Manatsu no Koi wa Eko janai ze Tomoo" (Japanese: 一円の重みを思い知るかともお / その鐘を鳴らすのは誰だともお / 真夏の恋はエコじゃないぜともお)	September 6, 2014
60	Transliteration: "Otona no Kaidan Fumihazuse Tomoo / Hana no Tsubomi ga Oshiete Kureta yo Tomoo" (Japanese: 大人の階段踏み外せともお / 花のつぼみが教えてくれたよともお)	September 13, 2014
61	Transliteration: "Nekketsu to Reisei no Dotchi dai Tomoo / Sā, Bōken da na Tomoo" (Japanese: 熱血と冷静のどっちだいともお / さあ、冒険だなともお)	September 20, 2014
62	Transliteration: "Kurushī Toki niwa Nani o Dasu no ka na Tomoo / Futago tte Dotchi ga Jō Nanda Tomoo" (Japanese: 苦しい時には何を出すのかなともお / 双子ってどっちが上なんだともお)	September 27, 2014
63	Transliteration: "Soko ni Jingi wa Arun ka nō Tomoo / Mukuwarete Hoshiku Naru Tomoo / Shinu Ki ni Nareru ka" (Japanese: そこに仁義はあるんかのうともお / 報われてほしくなるともお / 死ぬ気になれるかともお)	October 4, 2014
64	Transliteration: "Akirametara Shiai Shūryō na no ka Tomoo / Sore wa Honto ni Ofukuro na no ka Tomoo" (Japanese: 諦めたら試合終了なのかともお / それはホントにおふくろなのかともお)	October 11, 2014
65	Transliteration: "Nō Puroburemu ka yo Tomoo / Potto de, Jōtō ssu Tomoo" (Japanese: ノープロブレムかよともお / ポッと出、上等ッスともお)	October 18, 2014
66	Transliteration: "Sei to Shi o Tsukasadoru zo Tomoo / Itsumo yori Ōku Mawatta na Tomoo / Zoku Mukashi wa Kimi mo Wakakatta ne Taisa" (Japanese: 生と死を司るぞともお / いつもより多く回ったなともお / 続・昔は君も若かったね大佐)	October 25, 2014
67	Transliteration: "Sukurū Uōzu da ze Tomoo / Tantei wa Raku na Shokugyō janai na Tomoo" (Japanese: スクールでウォーズだぜともお / 探偵は楽な職業じゃないなともお)	November 1, 2014
68	Transliteration: "Dagashiori de Rei o Tsukusu Tomoo / Kōchō-sensei ni Kunji da Tomoo" (Japanese: 駄菓子折で礼を尽くすともお / 校長先生に訓示だともお)	November 8, 2014
69	Transliteration: "Sokoshirenu Gijutsu Ryoku da na Tomoo / Daijina Fukuro no Hitotsu da na Tomoo / Ki ga Tsukeba Shunkashūtō Tomoo" (Japanese: 底知れぬ技術力だなともお / 大事な袋のひとつだなともお / 気がつけば春夏秋冬ともお)	November 15, 2014
70	Transliteration: "Otona ni Natte mo Tsudzuke you Tomoo / Irete Kue Tomoo" (Japanese: 大人になっても続けようともお / 入れて食えともお)	November 22, 2014
71	Transliteration: "Saikō no Torēnā wa Dareda Tomoo / Sokomade wa Tsudzuite Nakatta na Tomoo" (Japanese: 最高のトレーナーは誰だともお / そこまでは続いてなかったなともお)	November 29, 2014
72	Transliteration: "Omoide ha Itsumo Tomoo / Nyūsu Sōsu wa Nani da Tomoo / Mono ni mo Rekishi Arika Tomoo" (Japanese: 思い出はいつもともお / ニュースソースは何だともお / 物にも歴史ありかともお)	December 13, 2014
73	Transliteration: "Waraukado ni wa Nani ga Kurun da Tomoo / Soredemo, Soredemo Tsudzuiteiku no ka na Tomoo" (Japanese: 笑う門には何が来るんだともお / それでも、それでも続いていくのかなともお)	December 20, 2014
74	Transliteration: "Hoshigaru ne~ Tomoo / Toshiyori no Hiyamizu da Tomoo" (Japanese: ホシがるね～ともお / 年寄りの冷や水だともお)	January 10, 2015
75	Transliteration: "Kimi-tachi ni Ashita wa nai no ka Tomoo / Aikōshi Aikō sare Ikiteku Tomoo" (Japanese: キミたちに明日はないのかともお / 愛好し愛好され生きてくともお)	January 17, 2015
76	Transliteration: "Kanpai o Kissu Tomoo / Mukashibanashi wa Munashi Hanashi na no ka Tomoo / Soitsu wa Sankyū da na Tomoo" (Japanese: 完敗を喫すともお / 昔話は虚し話なのかともお / そいつはサンキューだなともお)	January 24, 2015
77	Transliteration: "Ue o Muite Arukō Tomoo / Mahō no Chikara de Tsuyokunare Tomoo" (Japanese: 上を向いて歩こうともお / 魔法の力で強くなれともお)	January 31, 2015
78	Transliteration: "Afutākea mo Daiji tte koto Tomoo / Bukiyō desu kara Tomoo" (Japanese: アフターケアも大事ってことともお / 不器用ですからともお)	February 7, 2015
