= Nil Admirari no Tenbin: Teito Genwaku Kitan =

2016 video game

- Japanese cover art

ニル・アドミラリの天秤 帝都幻惑綺譚
- Genre: Dark fantasy
- Developer: Otomate
- Publisher: Idea Factory
- Director: Wataru Watanabe
- Artist: Satoi
- Writer: Yuma Katagiri
- Platform: PlayStation Vita
- Release: JP: April 21, 2016
- Genre: Visual novel
- Mode: Single-player
- Manga
- Written by: Shō Yuzuki
- Published by: Square Enix
- Magazine: Monthly G Fantasy
- Original run: January 18, 2018 – June 18, 2019
- Sequel
- Nil Admirari no Tenbin: Kuroyuri En'yōtan (2017); Nil Admirari no Tenbin: Irodori Nadeshiko (2018)
- Anime television series
- Nil Admirari no Tenbin (2018)

Nil Admirari no Tenbin: Teito Genwaku Kitan (Note: Japanese: ニル・アドミラリの天秤 帝都幻惑綺譚, Hepburn: Niru Adomirari no Tenbin: Teito Genwaku Kitan; lit. "Libra of Nil Admirari: Bewitching Tales of the Imperial Capital") is an otome visual novel video game developed by Otomate for PlayStation Vita that was first released on April 21, 2016. It was written by Yuma Katagiri, with art by Satoi. A sequel, Nil Admirari no Tenbin: Kuroyuri En'yōtan, was released in 2017, and was followed by another sequel, Nil Admirari no Tenbin: Irodori Nadeshiko, released in 2018 for the Nintendo Switch. An anime adaptation of the original game, directed by Masahiro Takata at Zero-G, aired in Japan from April 8 to June 24, 2018.

== Characters ==
=== Main characters ===
Tsugumi Kuze (久世 ツグミ, Kuze Tsugumi)
Voiced by: Juri Kimura (anime)
The player character. The daughter of the noble Kuze family that has begun to fall. Cheerful and intelligent, she has a very warm personality. However, she blames herself for the suicide attempt of her younger brother, which Tsugumi's arranged marriage seemed to have been the reason behind. Because she was like a mother to her younger brother, sometimes, she just can't leave people alone, and will try to help them.
Hayato Ozaki (尾崎 隼人, Ōzaki Hayato)
Voiced by: Yūki Kaji
A leader-like existence within the Search Team, he possesses a strong sense of justice. However, because he always speaks his mind, he easily ends up gives others the impression that he is a violent or rude person. His real name is 'Hayato Yashiro' and he's Tsugumi's fiancé chosen by her father.
Akira Kougami (鴻上 滉, Kōgami Akira)
Voiced by: Nobuhiko Okamoto
Though he takes his job very seriously, he always draws the line at developing relationships with other people, and does not involve himself with anyone outside of work.
Hisui Hoshikawa (星川 翡翠, Hoshikawa Hisui)
Voiced by: Ryōta Ōsaka
Well-mannered and polite, he takes on the role of disapproving of Hayato's blunt nature.
However, he also seems to dislike women. Because a special power awakened within him, he joined the Fukurou.
Shougo Ukai (鵜飼 昌吾, Ukai Shōgo)
Voiced by: Ryōhei Kimura
Law student at the Imperial University.
Proud son of Japan's prime minister. Due to a certain incident, he is staying at the Fukurou's living quarters. However, unused to this new lifestyle, he is always in a bad mood.
Shizuru Migiwa (汀 紫鶴, Migawa Shizuru)
Voiced by: Kenichi Suzumura
While he is a player, he is quite well-known as an author, especially for the tragedies he has written.
Due to a certain reason, he had to rely on connections and received permission to stay in the Fukurou's living quarters.
Rui Sagisawa (鷺澤 累, Sagisawa Rui)
Voiced by: Takahiro Sakurai
Med student at the Imperial University.
Working at a part-time job in between his studies, he is a calm med student. He is often reading in cafes or the library, and meets Tsugumi by coincidence.

=== Supporting characters ===
Hitaki Kuze (久世 ヒタキ, Kuze Hitaki)
Voiced by: Ayumu Murase
Tsugumi's brother who tried to commit a mysterious suicide. The contents of the old book he was holding as he tried to committee suicide was a book filled with emotions like: greed, jealousy, wrath, agony, anger, regret, hatred.
He loved books, and was a big fan of Migiwa Shizuru. As his parents were often away from home, his older sister was like a mother to him, and was the one who loved him the most.

== Development ==
Nil Admirari no Tenbin: Teito Genwaku Kitan was developed by Idea Factory's otome game branch Otomate. Character designs and illustrations were handled by Satoi while Yuma Katagiri wrote the scenario. It was released on April 21, 2016, in Japan for PlayStation Vita with a CERO D age rating. (Note: 17 years and older.) Annabel performed the opening theme titled "Sanctuary" while Suara performed the ending theme titled "Honoo no Tori" (焔の鳥).

== Reception ==
Reception

Review score
Publication	Score
Famitsu	32/40

Nil Admirari no Tenbin: Teito Genwaku Kitan was the twelfth best selling video game in Japan during its debut week, with 6,987 copies sold. Dengeki Girl's Style enjoyed the game's visuals and the depiction of its world. Famitsu's reviewers frequently commented on how they enjoyed the character designs and visuals, with its use of Taishō motifs and sepia tones.

== Related media ==
=== Official fan book ===
An official fan book featuring artwork by Satoi, interviews with Katagiri and the game's director, and character profiles, was published by ASCII Media Works on July 21, 2016, in Japan.

=== Anime ===
An anime adaptation of the original game was planned to premiere in early 2018. The anime, simply titled Nil Admirari no Tenbin, is produced by the studio Zero-G, and is directed by Masahiro Takata. Yukie Sakō adapting Satoi's character designs into animation, music by Tomoki Hasegawa, and Tomoko Komparu overseeing the script. The anime aired from April 8 to June 24, 2018. The series ran for 12 episodes.

=== Manga ===
A manga adaptation written by Shō Yuzuki will be serialized in Square Enix's Monthly G Fantasy magazine from January 18, 2018, until June 18, 2019, with three volumes. The series has been released in Indonesia by Elex Media Komputindo.

No.	Release date	ISBN
1	May 26, 2018	978-4-75-755737-6
2	January 26, 2019	978-4-75-755992-9
3	August 27, 2019	978-4-75-756263-9

== Sequel ==
A sequel, titled Nil Admirari no Tenbin: Kuroyuri En'yōtan (ニル・アドミラリの天秤 クロユリ炎陽譚) was announced at the Otomate Party 2016. On June 29, 2017, the game's opening theme, historia by Annabel, was released by Otomate. An official preview of the game was released on July 20. The game was released on September 21, 2017, for PlayStation Vita. The game was ported to Android and iOS on May 14, 2022.

== Compilation game ==
Nil Admirari no Tenbin: Iodori Nadeshiko (ニル・アドミラリの天秤 色ドリ撫子) was originally announced in May 2018, serving as a compilation game and port of both games to the Nintendo Switch. It was released on September 20, 2018, for the Nintendo Switch. 30 extra short stories were included as well.
