= This Art Club Has a Problem! =

Japanese manga and anime series

- Cover of This Art Club Has a Problem! volume 1 showing Mizuki Usami (left) and Subaru Uchimaki

この美術部には問題がある! (Kono Bijutsubu ni wa Mondai ga Aru!)
- Genre: Romantic comedy Slice of life
- Manga
- Written by: Imigimuru
- Published by: ASCII Media Works
- English publisher: NA: J-Novel Club
- Magazine: Dengeki Maoh
- Original run: October 27, 2012 – present
- Volumes: 15
- Anime television series
- Directed by: Kei Oikawa
- Produced by: Tanaka Junichiro; Kotaro Sudo; Akira Asakawa
- Written by: Naruhisa Arakawa
- Music by: Gin
- Studio: Feel
- Licensed by: NA: Maiden Japan; SEA: Muse Communication
- Original network: TBS, CBC, Sun TV, BS-TBS
- English network: SEA: Animax Asia
- Original run: July 7, 2016 – September 22, 2016
- Episodes: 12

This Art Club Has a Problem! (Japanese: この美術部には問題がある!, Hepburn: Kono Bijutsubu ni wa Mondai ga Aru!) or Konobi for short, is a Japanese manga series written and illustrated by Imigimuru. It focuses on the adventures of the members of Tsukimori Middle School's art club, where only Usami Mizuki cares about art at all. The president is always sleeping, while Uchimaki Subaru is only interested in painting his perfect 2D wife, frustrating Usami. The series has been serialized in ASCII Media Works' Dengeki Maoh magazine since October 2012. A 12-episode anime television series adaptation by Feel aired between July and September 2016.

== Characters ==
=== Main characters ===
Mizuki Usami (宇佐美 みずき, Usami Mizuki)
Voiced by: Ari Ozawa
Member of the Art Club who serves as the straight man of the group and probably the only one with common sense. She has feelings for Subaru, but denies it and sometimes covers it up with her tsundere acts.
Subaru Uchimaki (内巻 すばる, Uchimaki Subaru)
Voiced by: Yūsuke Kobayashi
Member of the Art Club who is not interested in 3D girls and always drawing 2D girls, hoping one day he would find a perfect 2D wife, even though he could easily win any art contest if he tried.
Colette (コレット, Koretto)
Voiced by: Sumire Uesaka
A first-year and a member of the Art Club who has only been in Japan for 6-7 years. She is very curious. Her forehead is sometimes drawn as shiny.
President (部長, Buchō)
Voiced by: Kentaro Tone
President of the Art Club and a third-year. Despite his position, the only thing he does in the clubroom is sleep.
Maria Imari (伊万莉まりあ, Imari Maria)
Voiced by: Nao Tōyama
A transfer student at Subaru's class who instantly becomes popular because of her looks. However, she suffered heavy "chunibyo" case. She shares otaku interests with Subaru, much to Mizuki's jealousy.
Yumeko Tachibana (立花 夢子, Tachibana Yumeko)
Voiced by: Nana Mizuki
Supervisor of the Art Club, although she is inexperienced, she is trying her best to be the Art Club Supervisor.

=== Others ===
Nonoka (ののか)
The President's childhood friend who often comically flirts with him; she calls him "Yō-chan".
Yukio Koyama (小山 幸夫, Koyama Yukio)
Voiced by: Hirohiko Kakegawa
The art club's original supervisor and Journalism club's actual supervisor, who passed the job onto Yumeko.
Kaori Ayase (綾瀬 かおり, Ayase Kaori)
Voiced by: Sora Tokui
Mizuki's best friend who wears a ribbon on her head.
Sayaka Honda (本多 さやか, Honda Sayaka)
Voiced by: Chiaki Shimogama
Mizuki's best friend who is a member of School News Club.
Ryōko Kunigawa (国川 涼子, Kunigawa Ryōko)
Voiced by: Kana Marutsuka
Mizuki's best friend who wears glasses.
Moeka (萌香)
Voiced by: Aimi Tanaka
A four-year-old girl who initially appeared as a lost child; the granddaughter of Koyama. In Episode 12 of the anime, she is revealed to have been tied to her mother Shizuka with a thick red string to prevent her from wandering off again. It is unknown if Moeka will ever get to be with Mizuki and the Art Club's other members ever again in the future since it is unknown if Shizuka likes Tsukimori Middle School and its Art Club.
Shizuka (静香)
Voiced by: Mikako Komatsu
Moeka's mother. In Episode 12 of the anime, she is revealed to have her daughter Moeka tied to her with a thick red string to prevent her from wandering off again. It is unknown if Shizuka will ever allow Moeka to be with Mizuki and the Art Club's other members again in the future since it is unknown if she likes Tsukimori Middle School and its Art Club.
Magical Ribbon (マジカルリボン, Majikaru Ribon)
Voiced by: Ayane Sakura
Subaru's favorite anime character. Her name Usami is coincidentally the same as Mizuki's last name.
Yurine Uchimaki (内巻 ゆりね, Uchimaki Yurine)
Subaru's older sister.

== Media ==
=== Manga ===
This Art Club Has a Problem! is written and illustrated by Imigimuru. It began serialization in ASCII Media Works' Dengeki Maoh magazine with the December 2012 issue, published on October 27, 2012. At Anime Expo 2023, J-Novel Club announced that they licensed the series for English publication.

No.	Original release date	Original ISBN	English release date	English ISBN
1	May 27, 2013	978-4-04-891645-5	September 13, 2023	978-1-71-832330-8
1. "Problematic People"; 2. "The Murder of the Art Club President"; 3. "Goodbye, Uchimaki-kun"; 4. "Where's That Thing I Was Looking For"; 5. "Let's Draw a Poster!"; 6. "Colette in the Sky"
2	December 19, 2013	978-4-04-866100-3	December 27, 2023	978-1-71-832331-5
7. "Short Bob"; 8. "Welcome to the Art Club!"; 9. "Love Letter Panic"; 10. "The Good, the Bad, and the Lost"; 11. "Train of Misunderstanding"; 12. "Little by Little, Bit by Bit"; Bonus chapter: "Rumors Has It That Usami-san Is an Esper"
3	June 27, 2014	978-4-04-866666-4	April 24, 2024	978-1-71-832332-2
13. "Doves, Mermaids, and Pool Cleanings"; 14. "Strollette"; 15. "A indirect Kiss"; 16. "A Fluid Sense of Self"; 17. "Ennui"; 18. "A Joint Art Project? That's a First! (part 1 of 2)"; 19. "A Joint Art Project? That's a First! (part 2 of 2)"; Bonus chapter: "The Person Inside"
4	February 27, 2015	978-4-04-869234-2	August 7, 2024	978-1-71-832333-9
20. "Mystery of the Cute Transfer Student"; 21. "A Most Curious Couple"; 22. "Shopping"; 23. "Comrades, I Convoke Thee!"; 24. "The Secret Room (Part 1 of 2)"; 25. "The Secret Room (Part 2 of 2)"; 26. "Who's Ready to Go On a Scavenger Hunt?"
5	October 27, 2015	978-4-04-865349-7	December 11, 2024	978-1-71832334-6
27. "Turquoise Blue Memories"; 28. "Master Imari"; 29. "In Search of Grimoires!"; 30. "Usami's Cram School"; 31. "Art Club Unite! Soda Can Art (Part 1 of 2)"; 32. "Art Club Unite! Soda Can Art (Part 2 of 2)"; 33. "A Joint Art Project? That's a First! (part 2 of 2)"; Bonus chapter: "A Challenger Reappears" Bonus chapter: "Soda Can Art Epilogue"
6	June 27, 2016	978-4-04-892124-4	—	—
7	September 27, 2016	978-4-04-892339-2	—	—
8	May 26, 2017	978-4-04-892910-3	—	—
9	February 26, 2018	978-4-04-893600-2	—	—
10	September 27, 2018	978-4-04-912141-4	—	—
11	May 25, 2019	978-4-04-912548-1	—	—
12	February 27, 2020	978-4-04-913039-3	—	—
13	December 26, 2020	978-4-04-913517-6	—	—
14	August 27, 2021	978-4-04-913895-5	—	—
15	October 27, 2022	978-4-04-914486-4	—	—

=== Anime ===
A 12-episode anime adaptation produced by Feel aired between July 7 and September 22, 2016. The opening theme is "Starting Now!" by Nana Mizuki, and the ending theme is "Koisuru Zukei (cubic futurismo)" (恋する図形 (cubic futurismo), lit. 'Figures in Love (Cubic Futurismo)') by Sumire Uesaka. An insert song titled "Aozora Canvas" (青空キャンバス, lit. 'Sky Blue Canvas') featured in episode five is sung by Ari Ozawa, Uesaka and Mizuki. Another insert song titled "Kokoro Palette (Mizuki ver.)" (ココロ*パレット (Mizuki ver.), lit. Heart Palette (Mizuki ver.)) by Ozawa as Mizuki Usami is featured in episode 11. The series was released on six Blu-ray and DVD compilation volumes between September 28, 2016, and February 22, 2017. The anime is licensed by Maiden Japan for streaming on Hidive and for an eventual Blu-ray release.

No.	Official English title (Note: All English titles are taken from Crunchyroll.) Original Japanese title	Original release date
1	"These People Have Problems"; Transliteration: "Mondai ga Aru Hitotachi" (Japanese: 問題がある人たち)	July 7, 2016
1	"Goodbye, Uchimaki-kun"; Transliteration: "Sayonara Uchimaki-kun" (Japanese: さよなら内巻くん)	July 7, 2016
Mizuki tries to do well in her school's Art Club, but she seems to be the only person focusing on her art. The club president does nothing but sleep in the room, and her clubmate Subaru only creates "2D wives" with his time, frustrating Mizuki to no end. After Subaru asks Mizuki to pose for him, his painting only uses the same panties she wore, ignoring her pose and likeness entirely, though he secretly sketches her pose afterwards. Later, Subaru plans to quit the club after finalizing his "perfect wife", leading Mizuki to tearfully try to beg him not to leave. When she composes herself the next day, Subaru is moved enough by Mizuki's actions that he decides to set his previous art aside and work on a new 2D wife, inspired by Mizuki's crying.
2	"The Murder Case of Art Club's President"; Transliteration: "Bijutsubu Buchō Satsujin Jiken" (Japanese: 美術部部長殺人事件)	July 14, 2016
2	"Good Child Poor Child Lost Child"; Transliteration: "Ii Ko Warui Ko Maigo no Ko" (Japanese: 良い子悪い子迷子の子)	July 14, 2016
2	"Love Letter Panic"; Transliteration: "Rabu Retā Panikku" (Japanese: ラブレターパニック)	July 14, 2016
After accidentally knocking over one of Mizuki's paintings into a puddle of red paint, the president tries to cover it up, but Mizuki quickly sees through the ruse. The club is forced to submit one of Subaru's paintings for a contest instead, which ends up winning second place. Later, at a sleepover, Mizuki flashes back to when Subaru was able to quickly sketch a missing girl's mother from memory to reunite the girl with her mother. The next day, Subaru asks Mizuki for advice on rejecting a love letter, as he only loves "2D girls." On the way home from school, Subaru appears to be attracted to an elementary-school girl, but turns out to be only interested in the character strap on her bag.
3	"Where's the Thing You're Looking For?"; Transliteration: "Sagashi Mono wa Doko e Itta?" (Japanese: さがしものはどこへいった？)	July 21, 2016
3	"Short Bob"; Transliteration: "Shōto Bobu" (Japanese: ショートボブ)	July 21, 2016
3	"Indirect Kiss"; Transliteration: "Kansetsu Kissu" (Japanese: 缶接キッス)	July 21, 2016
Subaru finds Colette, the youngest member of the Art Club, in the clubroom looking for a locket with a "precious photo" in it. She turns out to have left it in her pocket the whole time. Subaru has trouble painting the perfect hairstyle for his latest "wife" and Mizuki suggests a "short bob" - her own hairstyle - while Colette mishears it as "Shō to Bob" and draws two guys named Shō and Bob. The next day after school, Mizuki's friends - Kaori, Sayaka, and Ryōko - come to look at the Art Club's room. The three decide to do a drawing contest where the loser with the ugliest art has to buy drinks and that person is Kaori. Kaori offers Subaru her drink, but Mizuki snatches it and drinks it out of jealousy. Subaru decides to drink Mizuki's soda instead.
4	"Welcome to the Art Club"; Transliteration: "Bijutsubu e Yōkoso" (Japanese: 美術部へようこそ)	July 28, 2016
4	"Colette's Walk"; Transliteration: "Kore Sanpo" (Japanese: コレさんぽ)	July 28, 2016
4	"Little by Little, Bit by Bit"; Transliteration: "Sukoshi Zutsu, Chotto Zutsu" (Japanese: 少しずつ、ちょっとずつ)	July 28, 2016
Yumeko is handed the faculty advisor position for the Art Club. Though Yumeko is frightened of the club members' various quirks at first, she lets Subaru and Mizuki draw a quick picture of her. One day, Colette plays a game where she tries to stay in the shadows outside. She passes the game on to a little girl, who happens to be interested in art herself after past events ("Good Child Poor Child Lost Child"). Subaru comes over to Mizuki's house at night to give her missing homework papers. Mizuki tries to work up the courage to ask him for his contact info. Meanwhile, Mizuki's mom lurks nearby, spying on their relationship.
5	"Mistake Train"; Transliteration: "Kanchigai Torein" (Japanese: 勘違いトレイン)	August 4, 2016
5	"Doves, Mermaids and Pool Cleaning"; Transliteration: "Hato to Ningyo to Pūru Sōji" (Japanese: ハトと人魚とプール掃除)	August 4, 2016
When she is alone in the room, Colette paints over a model head, but goes too far and flees. This action sets off a series of miscues: Yumeko faints after seeing what she thinks is a real head in a box, Subaru tries to give Yumeko mouth-to-mouth resuscitation while reluctant to do so with a 3D woman, the president spots the two and thinks they are making out, and finally Mizuki gets help from a teacher before Colette confesses to what really happened. One day, the Art Club is assigned to clean the school's pool. The president suggests painting a picture on the pool surface before rinsing it away. After taking a photo of their work, the club discovers that the president accidentally bought oil-based paint that does not wash off.
6	"The Mysterious Cute Transfer Girl"; Transliteration: "Nazo no Bishōjo Tenkōsei" (Japanese: 謎の美少女転校生)	August 11, 2016
6	"A Curious Couple"; Transliteration: "Ki ni Naru Futari" (Japanese: 気になる2人)	August 11, 2016
A new girl named Maria Imari transfers into Subaru's class. Mizuki suddenly finds herself fighting with Maria for Subaru's attention, as Maria seems to have very similar hobbies and interests to Subaru. On the way back from the bookstore, Subaru, Mizuki, and Maria help retrieve a balloon from a tree for a sad child. Mizuki wonders if she can co-exist with this new rival.
7	"Our First Joint Task...?"; Transliteration: "Hajimete no Kyōdō Sagyō...?" (Japanese: はじめての共同作業...?)	August 18, 2016
7	"Master Imari"; Transliteration: "Masutā Imari" (Japanese: マスター伊万莉)	August 18, 2016
Yumeko enrolls the Art Club in a regional competition. After a classmate insults the Art Club's previous entry ("The Murder Case of Art Club's President"), Mizuki declares that her club will win the contest with another of Subaru's paintings. On the day of the exhibition, Subaru's drawing wins first prize, while the classmate's entry does not even earn a spot. Colette declares that she wants to be a "Hero of Justice" when she graduates from school, but no one takes her seriously. As she runs to the roof, she stumbles across Maria, who is acting out an original fantasy. Colette becomes drawn into her world and shows up the next day wearing a similar costume.
8	"The Secret Room"; Transliteration: "Himitsu no Heya" (Japanese: 秘密の部屋)	August 25, 2016
8	"Let's Have a Treasure Hunt"; Transliteration: "Rettsu Torejā Hanto" (Japanese: れっつとれじゃーはんと)	August 25, 2016
While everyone is doing their usual club work, Mizuki is the only one who can't concentrate due to the painted head (from "Mistake Train"), hence they look for a new thing to act as a model. The president states that there might be an old plaster figure in the art club storage room next door. Mizuki and Subaru look together, and they instantly get preoccupied by the things in the store. Before they knew it, the door can't be opened (it was broken somehow), and they spent time together in the room for a couple of hours until they found out that there is a door connecting the club room and the storage room. In the end, the old plaster figure they found is also painted, probably by the past club members. After the founding of the storage room, Subaru and Maria spend time together in the store reading manga together, to Mizuki's dismay. Suddenly, Maria found a riddle for treasure in one of the manga by the past art club members, so they start looking for it. It turns out to be a porn magazine.
9	"Find the Grimoire!"; Transliteration: "Madōsho o Oe!" (Japanese: 魔導書を追え!)	September 1, 2016
9	"The Challenger Returns"; Transliteration: "Chōsensha Futatabi" (Japanese: 挑戦者ふたたび)	September 1, 2016
9	"Moe Stroll"; Transliteration: "Moe Sanpo" (Japanese: もえさんぽ)	September 1, 2016
Maria tells Colette that she is looking for "Necronomicon", a dangerous magical grimoire. Due to a misunderstanding, Yumeko also joins in the search. Meanwhile, the president wants the porn magazine (from "Let's Treasure Hunt") for himself. When Yumeko enters the clubroom, she says the grimoire's name incorrectly, and the president thinks she meant "Nekomi Lock On", which is written on the front cover of the magazine. This forces Mizuki and Subaru to hide the book under Subaru's shirt, as they try to make it out of the school. Colette and Maria find them acting suspiciously, and Colette thinks Subaru is trying to hide "Necronomicon" under his shirt, and snatch the magazine from him after a struggle. Yumeko walks in at the same time; and after confirming that Subaru had the book previously, is asked to meet with her at the teacher's lounge for punishment. Subaru meets the challenger (from "Our First Joint Task...?") again, and they compete to a drawing, with Mizuki as the model. Infatuated with Mizuki's cuteness, the challenger ends up drawing nothing and loses the contest. Moeka, the girl that Subaru and Mizuki helped before ("Good Child Poor Child Lost Child") finds the president ditching class at school, and she ends up hanging out with him as he escorts her to the teacher's lounge to meet with her grandfather, who turns out to be Yukio, art club's former adviser.
10	"Nostalgic Turquoise Blue"; Transliteration: "Omoide no Tākoizu Burū" (Japanese: 思い出のターコイズブルー)	September 8, 2016
10	"Usami Cram School"; Transliteration: "Usami Juku" (Japanese: 宇佐美塾)	September 8, 2016
10	"Buster Kaori"; Transliteration: "Basutā Kaori" (Japanese: バスターかおり)	September 8, 2016
In a flashback, it's shown that Mizuki and Subaru's popularity in school has risen right after they helped Moeka ("Good Child Poor Child Lost Child"). Mizuki meets Sayaka Honda for the first time, a member of the newspaper club, who wants to interview them about the lost child case. Takeda signs Mizuki up for the Student Council election, with which Mizuki has trouble declining. After hearing what Mizuki said about him during the interview from Sayaka, Subaru helps her to make a refusal. Subaru and Colette get poor marks on the last exam, angering Yumeko. All four Art Club members end up meeting at Mizuki's house to study. Colette ends up falling asleep next to Subaru on Mizuki's bed, angering her. In the end, both Colette and Subaru get good results. Kaori, under the suspicion of Maria going to snatch Subaru from Mizuki, tails her throughout the day, but ultimately fails to find anything interesting. Instead, she is treated well by Maria, and her perception of Maria drastically changes the next day.
11	"Unity! Empty Cans! Cultural Festival!"; Transliteration: "Danketsu! Aki Kan! Bunkasai!" (Japanese: 団結! 空き缶! 文化祭!)	September 15, 2016
Hearing from Yukio that Art Club only focuses on competition and not some cultural festival, Yumeko wants them to contribute something for a cultural festival. Getting inspired by the empty cans people throw out, she decides that the Art Club should make a tin can art, and she reserves the gym for display. Subaru suggests making a waifu, while Colette suggests a hero; both propositions are denied by Mizuki. Mizuki comes up with a design of her own to make a sculpture of a paint tube, with some paint spilling out (suggested by Maria). The problem arises when Moroboshi-sensei misunderstands Maria's chuuni-like expression and thinks the cans are to be thrown out. The president suggests that they buy canned drinks from outside and sell them at the school in order to fit the theme "Made in School". The art challenger ("Our First Joint Task...?" & "The Challenger Returns") returns; this time having a drinking match with Subaru, in which he loses. When the art is finally ready and done, the president points out that it is too big to fit through the door, thus they need to dismantle it once more.
12	"From Now On"; Transliteration: "Korekara saki mo" (Japanese: これからさきも)	September 22, 2016
It's raining outside and Mizuki is running an errand for a teacher. Kaori texts Mizuki telling her that she is going to borrow her umbrella, much to Mizuki's annoyance. After she is done with the errand, Subaru meets her by the entrance of the school and they share an umbrella going home. Later, as Mizuki is heading to the Art Club, she overhears Subaru telling Maria that he has fallen for Usami. At the club room, Mizuki tries to confess to Subaru that she likes him, but she is interrupted by Subaru's revelation that the Usami he has fallen for is actually an anime character. Subaru asks Mizuki whether he can call her by her first name to avoid confusion, to which Mizuki doesn't give a clear answer. In the evening, Moeka spots Mizuki leaving the school, and attempts to get her attention, but the thick rope with which she was tied to her mother Shizuka prevents her from wandering off again. The next day, Mizuki encounters Subaru while walking to school and she tells him that he should keep calling her by her last name. Subaru says he is fine with it since he has grown out of the character from the anime after finding out she has a boyfriend.

== See also ==
- Too Many Losing Heroines!, a light novel series also illustrated by Imigimuru
