= Aimi Tanaka =

Japanese voice actress

- 田中 あいみ
- Born: April 28, 1992 (age 34); Tokyo, Japan
- Occupations: Voice actress, singer
- Years active: 2013–present
- Agent: 81 Produce
- Notable work: Himouto! Umaru-chan as Umaru Doma; Umamusume: Pretty Derby as Biko Pegasus

Aimi Tanaka (田中 あいみ, Tanaka Aimi; born April 28, 1992) is a Japanese voice actress and singer affiliated with 81 Produce. She won the Best Rookie Actress Award at the 10th Seiyu Awards. She made her album "Cobalt" under the label Wave Master. She is the voice provider of Internet Co., Ltd. and MTK's VOCALOID4 vocal Otomachi Una, and by extension Una's Talk EX, VOICEROID2 and Voidol speech voicebanks. She worked on three updates for the vocal, VOCALOID6:AI Otomachi Una, Synthesizer V AI Otomachi Una, and a following Synthesizer V 2 AI update voicebank.

== Filmography ==
=== Anime ===
Year	Title	Role	Notes
2013	Unlimited Psychic Squad	Baby	
2013	Aikatsu!	Girl, Baby	
2013	Stella Women's Academy, High School Division Class C3	Girl, Girl A, Kaori, Kyōko	
2013	Magical Girl Site	Mikado Ikemata	
2013	Hayate the Combat Butler! Cuties	Audience	
2013	Danchi Tomoo	Boy, Haruka Fukuoka, Serizawa	
2013	Yowamushi Pedal	Schoolgirl	
2013	Line Town	Alien	
2014	The Pilot's Love Song	Nina Viento's actress	
2014	Tokyo ESP	Girl	
2014	Dragon Collection	Friend A	
2014	Laughing Under the Clouds	Gerokichi, Poko	
2014	Hanayamata	Guest	
2014	Yuki Yuna Is a Hero	Classmate	
2014	Wasimo	Hiyori	
2015	Absolute Duo	Miwa	
2015	Bikini Warriors	Cleric	
2015	Cross Ange	Priestess	
2015	Blood Blockade Battlefront	Nurse	
2015	Anti-Magic Academy: The 35th Test Platoon	Degarashi/Kanaria	
2015	Pikaia!	Wendy	
2015	Himouto! Umaru-chan	Umaru Doma	
2015	Magical Somera-chan	Aya Matsushima	
2015	Wish Upon the Pleiades	Yuki, Yuzuru, Nanako's brother	
2015	Yamada-kun and the Seven Witches	Eri	
2015	Lance N' Masques	Ryū Yuien	
2016	Aikatsu Stars!	Maaya Kanno	
2016	Active Raid: Kidō Kyōshūshitsu Daihachigakari 2nd	Marimo Kaburagi	
2016	Kamiwaza Wanda	Girl	
2016	Rin-ne	Kana Noroi	
2016	This Art Club Has a Problem!	Moeka, Girl (episode 6)	
2016	The Disastrous Life of Saiki K.	Kusuo Saiki (young)	
2016	Show by Rock!!	Peipain	
2016	Time Travel Girl	Jean	
2016	Time Bokan 24	Sister	
2016	Dagashi Kashi	Ono	
2016	Hybrid × Heart Magias Academy Ataraxia	Grace	
2016	Re:Zero	Plum Risch	
2016	ReLIFE	Volleyball Club Member B	
2016	Zannen Onna Kanbu Black General-san	Black General	
2017	Interviews with Monster Girls	Schoolgirl	
2017	Little Witch Academia	Girl	
2017	MARGINAL #4 the Animation	Rui Aiba (young)	
2017	Twin Angels BREAK	Koromi Ukari, RunRun	
2017	Atom: The Beginning	Shizu Akiba	
2017	The Laughing Salesman	Fake grandson	
2017	Chi's Sweet Home	Child A	
2017	Infini-T Force	Anna Kurosawa	
2017	Dia Horizon	Sofia	
2017	Two Car	Megumi Meguro	
2017	My Girlfriend Is Shobitch	Schoolgirl	
2017	Anime-Gatari	Schoolgirl	
2017	Juni Taisen: Zodiac War	Grandson	
2017	Rin-ne	Kana Noroi	
2017	Himouto! Umaru-chan R	Umaru Doma	
2018	Aikatsu Friends!	Marin Manami	
2018	Food Wars!: Shokugeki no Soma	Berta	
2018	Anima Yell!	Akane Sawatari	
2018	Baki the Grappler	Child	
2019	How Clumsy you are, Miss Ueno	Tanaka	
2019	Fruits Basket	Female student	
2019	Aikatsu on Parade!	Marin Manami	
2019	Re:Stage! Dream Days♪	Misaki Sango	
2020	Re:Zero − Starting Life in Another World	Ryuzu Meyer	
2021	So I'm a Spider, So What?	Yuri	
2021	Non Non Biyori Nonstop	Akane Shinoda	
2021	Tropical-Rouge! Pretty Cure	Kururun, Hina	
2023	Malevolent Spirits: Mononogatari	Kagami	
2024	The Witch and the Beast	Owent Farmington	
2024	Spice and Wolf: Merchant Meets the Wise Wolf	Mayuri	
2024	Chi's Sweet Summer Vacation	Tida	
2025	Miru: Paths to My Future	Pochimaru	
2025	Summer Pockets	Umi Katō	
2025	A Ninja and an Assassin Under One Roof	Minato Izutsumi	
2026	The Case Book of Arne	Arne Neuntöte (young)	

=== Video games ===
Year	Title	Role
2015	Mobius Final Fantasy	Mog
2016	Soul Reverse Zero	Europa
2017	Danganronpa V3: Killing Harmony	Himiko Yumeno
2017	Nights of Azure 2: Bride of the New Moon	Eleanor Ernest
2017	Little Witch Academia: Chamber of Time	Bice
2017	Tokyo Clanpool	Hotaru Urushibara
2018	Alice Gear Aegis	Yayoi Fujino
2018	Digimon Rearise	Nozomi Tamada
2018	Girls' Frontline	SAA
2018	Summer Pockets	Umi Katō
2019	Astral Chain	Marie Wentz
2019	The King of Fighters All Star	May Lee Jinju
2020	Dragalia Lost	Pipple
2020	Spice and Wolf VR 2	Mayuri
2021	The Idolmaster Starlit Season	Kohaku Okuzora
2021	Umamusume: Pretty Derby	Biko Pegasus
2022	Azur Lane	MOT Royal Fortune
2023	Goddess of Victory: Nikke	Rei
2025	Stella Sora	Laru

=== Dubbing ===
- A Good Man (Mya (Sofia Nicolaescu))
- Resident Alien (Max Hawthorne (Judah Prehn))
- Swiss Army Man (Crissie (Antonia Ribero))

=== Other ===
Year	Title	Role
2016	VOCALOID4	Otomachi Una
2017	Talk Ex	Otomachi Una
2020	VOICEROID2	Otomachi Una
2021	Voidol	Otomachi Una
2023	VOCALOID6:AI	Otomachi Una
2023	VOICEPEAK	Otomachi Una
2024	Synthesizer V AI	Otomachi Una
2025	Synthesizer V 2 AI	Otomachi Una

== Discography ==
=== Mini Album ===
Year	Mini Album details	Catalog No.	Peak Oricon chart positions
2019	Cobalt: Released: May 8, 2019; Label: Wave Master; Format: CD	WM-0765	
