= Yuka Takakura =

Japanese voice actress

- 高倉 有加
- Born: 5 February
- Occupation: Voice actress
- Years active: 2005–present
- Employer: 81 Produce
- Notable work: UQ Holder! as Tōta Konoe; Blue Reflection Ray as Momo Tanabe
- Spouse: Kentaro Tone
- Children: 1

Yuka Takakura (高倉 有加, Takakura Yuka, born 5 February) is a Japanese voice actress from Osaka Prefecture, affiliated with 81 Produce. She is known for voicing Tōta Konoe in UQ Holder! and Momo Tanabe in Blue Reflection Ray.

== Biography ==
Yuka Takakura, a native of Osaka Prefecture, was born on 5 February. She was educated at the Amusement Media Academy Department of Voice Acting and Talent. She is a graduate of the 81 Actor's Studio's Tokyo campus.

Takakura's voice acting career began in 2005, voicing a guard in Glass Mask. In December 2016, she was cast as Ōshima in Urara Meirocho. In March 2017, she was cast as Tōta Konoe, the main character in UQ Holder!. In March 2021, she was cast as Momo Tanabe in Blue Reflection Ray.

On 15 June 2019, it was confirmed on both her and voice actor Kentaro Tone's Twitter accounts that they had married. Their first child, a girl, was born on 24 December 2021.

Takakura's voice type is alto, and she uses the Kansai dialect. She plays badminton as a hobby.

== Filmography ==
=== Animated television ===
Year	Title	Role	Ref.
2005	Glass Mask	Satomi’s guard, et al.	
2006	Spider Riders	Noia Raia	
2008	Rosario + Vampire	high school girl	
2008	Zenryoku Usagi	child	
2009	Beyblade: Metal Fusion	child	
2009	Gokujō!! Mecha Mote Iinchō	audience	
2009	Pandora Hearts	female student	
2010	Tamagotchi!	Shigurehimecchi, Giragiratchi	
2011	Bakuman	female student	
2011	Level E	Mayuzumi Maya	
2013	Gon	Kiran	
2013	The "Hentai" Prince and the Stony Cat	Mai Maimaki	
2014	Magimoji Rurumo	Seitarō Shibaki	
2016	Taboo Tattoo	Kashinika	
2017	Alice & Zoroku	Chinatsu Nakanishi	
2017	Minami Kamakura High School Girls Cycling Club	Rinko Karino	
2017	Urara Meirocho	Ōshima	
2017	UQ Holder!	Tōta Konoe	
2021	Blue Reflection Ray	Momo Tanabe	
