= UQ Holder! =

Japanese manga and anime series

- First tankōbon volume cover, featuring Kurōmaru Tokisaka (left), Tōta Konoe (center), and Yukihime (right)
- Genre: Action, fantasy
- Manga
- Written by: Ken Akamatsu
- Published by: Kodansha
- English publisher: NA: Kodansha USA
- Imprint: Shōnen Magazine Comics
- Magazine: Weekly Shōnen Magazine; (August 28, 2013–June 22, 2016); Bessatsu Shōnen Magazine; (October 8, 2016–February 9, 2022)
- Original run: August 28, 2013 – February 9, 2022
- Volumes: 28
- Original video animation
- Directed by: Youhei Suzuki
- Studio: J.C.Staff
- Licensed by: AUS: Madman Entertainment; NA: Sentai Filmworks; UK: MVM Films
- Released: September 8, 2017 – June 8, 2018
- Runtime: 25 minutes
- Episodes: 3
- Anime television series

UQ Holder! Magister Negi Magi! 2
- Directed by: Youhei Suzuki
- Produced by: Makoto Furukawa; Yoko Tanaka; Gouta Aijima; Ryūtarō Kawakami
- Written by: Ken Akamatsu; Shogo Yasukawa
- Music by: Kei Haneoka; Shunpei Ishige
- Studio: J.C.Staff
- Licensed by: AUS: Madman Entertainment; NA: Sentai Filmworks; SEA: Muse Communication; UK: MVM Films
- Original network: Tokyo MX, Sun TV, KBS, BS11, AT-X, tvk
- English network: SEA: Animax Asia
- Original run: October 2, 2017 – December 18, 2017
- Episodes: 12
- Related
- Negima! Magister Negi Magi (prequel)

UQ Holder! (Note: UQ (ユーキュー, Yūkyū) derives from the word yūkyū (悠久; 'eternity'), whose kanji entwines inside the UQ logo, which alludes to the immortal nature of the characters. During the broadcast period of its anime adaptation, it was titled UQ Holder!: Magister Negi Magi! 2.) is a Japanese manga series written and illustrated by Ken Akamatsu. It was serialized in Kodansha's Weekly Shōnen Magazine from 2013 to 2016 and later transferred to Bessatsu Shōnen Magazine, where it was serialized from 2016 to 2022. Set several generations later in the world of his previous work Negima! Magister Negi Magi, it follows the adventures of Tōta Konoe, a young boy who is transformed into a vampire and joins a secret society composed of immortal beings.

== Plot ==
Tōta Konoe, the grandson of Negi Springfield, aspires to leave his village and live life in the city of Shin-Tokyo, which has a tower structure rising into space. When he is mortally wounded by a bounty hunter who was hunting after his guardian, Yukihime. He discovers he has been made into an immortal vampire by Yukihime, a 700-year-old vampire mage Evangeline A.K. McDowell. Picking up another boy named Kuromaru along the way, they go to a place outside Shin-Tokyo where Yukihime leads a secret society of immortals called UQ Holder.

== Characters ==
=== UQ Holder ===
UQ Holder is a secret organization of immortals and yōkai led by Yukihime. Its members reside at the Senkyokan (lit. 'Fairyland Manor') estate, 10 km from the Shin-Tokyo coast, which fronts as a hot springs resort. Its main members are known as Numbers. Its goals are to protect other immortals living on the Earth,^{Ch. 7, 11} as well as helping the outcasts of society.^{Vol. 2, 4} It is also interested in protecting humans from the immortals that are intent on destroying society.^{Vol. 5}

Tōta Konoe (近衛 刀太, Konoe Tōta)
Voiced by: Yuka Takakura (Japanese); Brittney Karbowski (English)
Tōta is a 14-year-old boy raised by Yukihime after his parents died two years prior in a car accident. His grandfather was assumed to be the legendary magician Negi Springfield,^{Ch. 1} At the start of the series, when he is mortally wounded by an assassin while protecting Yukihime, he discovers he had been transformed by her into a vampire and then drinks her blood to affirm his immortality.^{Ch. 1} His dream is to be worthy to ascend Amanomihashira, the tower in Shin-Tokyo which leads into outer space. He would like to be a singer to support his friend in a band, but has a horrible singing voice and is disillusioned that he won't be able to develop a deeper voice or grow taller now that he is immortal.^{Ch. 2} Although immortal, he cannot regenerate severed limbs if the limb still has some life in it.^{Ch. 8} Within the UQ Holder group, he is member number 7.^{Ch. 11} Tōta uses a gravity blade, a sword that can adjust its weight thousand-times fold or more.^{Ch. 9} He also has the power of "Magia Erebea", allowing him to absorb magic into his own body, bonding it to his soul.^{Ch. 22-24} In Volume 7, it is revealed that he was not a descendant of Negi's but a clone of him.^{Vol. 7} It is later revealed that his DNA was made of Negi's and Asuna Kagurazaka.
Yukihime (雪姫)
Voiced by: Yuki Matsuoka (Japanese); Heidi Hinkel (Yukihime), Shanae'a Moore (Evangeline A.K. McDowell) (English)
Evangeline A.K. McDowell is a 700-year-old vampire who, after parting ways with her friends from the Mahora Academy, adopted the alias "Yukihime" and established the secret "UQ Holder" society for immortal beings. She appears as a tall and attractive woman with white-blonde hair and blue eyes, although she can assume her true form of a 10-year-old girl on occasion.^{Ch. 1-3, 30} She becomes Tōta's guardian after she was allegedly involved in a car accident that killed his birth parents. Still, their dying wish was to have Tota survive, and she transformed him into a vampire. At the start of the series, she is a teacher in a small village school, but later takes Tōta into the city and on their adventures.^{Ch. 1} Later, it is revealed that Yukihime had met Tōta centuries before becoming his guardian due to a temporal paradox and bonded with him at that time, implying that she also fell in love with him at the occasion. She also still harbors feelings for Negi but claims that she intends to uphold her promise to him of ending his life should the Lifemaker succeed in taking over his body. Later, it is revealed by Dana through a picture that in the original dimension from Negima, Evangeline married Nagi Springfield after he was freed from Ialda's control by Negi.^{Ch. 141} Yukihime becomes Ialda's newest host after Tōta sacrifices himself for 47 years to save the Earth. ^{Ch. 183}
Kurōmaru Tokisaka (時坂 九郎丸, Tokisaka Kurōmaru)
Voiced by: Yuuki Hirose (Japanese); Kalin Coates (English)
A member of the fushigari (immortal hunters) clan, Kurōmaru has been immortal for about 4 1/2 years before meeting Tōta.^{Ch. 9} She has black hair styled in black twin tails, and her bangs typically cover over her left eye. Kuromaru's mission was to slay Yukihime or never return. Still, after losing to Tōta, she joined him and Yukihime on their adventures. Despite claiming to be a boy, Kurōmaru has shy mannerisms such as covering her chest that Tōta and others often confuse him to be a girl or a boy.^{Ch. 3-6} Kurōmaru later reveals that he comes from a tribe of demi-humans called yata ga karasu (crow in Japanese mythology) who are born genderless but can choose their gender at age 16 or naturally settle into one.^{Ch. 16} Although Kurōmaru wants to be Tōta's brother-in-arms, Kurōmaru develops romantic feelings towards Tōta. Kurōmaru's body slowly transforms toward the feminine side despite not being age 16 yet; showing their body to become the opposite gender of their lover to be compatible with them.^{Ch. 101} Kurōmaru is an adept of the Kyoto Shinmei-ryū sword style and other Eastern battle techniques^{Ch. 3} and later becomes the first to form a pactio with Tōta. Later on in the story, Kurōmaru's body becomes fully feminine and she gains the ability to alter her hair color at will. ^{Ch. 181} Kurōmaru and Tōta then have sexual intercourse after confessing their love for each other.
Gengorō Makabe (真壁 源五郎, Makabe Gengorō)
Voiced by: Yuki Kaji (Japanese); Houston Hayes (English)
Gengorō Makabe is member number 6 in UQ Holder; he has short hair and wears glasses.^{Ch. 28} Gengorō Makabe originates from an alternate reality in the year 2021, during the COVID-19 pandemic. He was transported to the UQ Holder! world when he was hit by a truck and gained video game-like powers. ^{Ch. 186} He has a limited number of extra lives that allow him to revive instantly after dying and which he refills by doing good deeds. He can also summon several weapons instantly and evaluate his opponents like a game character's stats. He ends up using all his extra lives to help the rest of UQ Holder to stop a terrorist attack, thus losing his immortality temporarily, but ending up surviving by getting an extra life by having saved mortals from the bombing.^{Ch. 146} During an attack by Ialda and Negi's corrupted comrades, Makabe's powers are nullified. He is returned to his home dimension, though he also brings Tōta and Jūzō with him unintentionally.^{Ch. 186} In order to return to the UQ Holder! world, Makabe, Tōta, and Jūzō leap off a roof and are transported to the moment that Makabe's powers were neutralised.^{Ch. 187}
Karin Yuuki (結城夏凛, Yūki Karin)
Voiced by: Yui Ogura (Japanese); Molly Searcy (English)
Member number 4 in UQ Holder and nicknamed the Saintess of Steel, ^{Vol. 3 profile, Ch. 20} Karin is a quiet girl around the same appearance in age as Tōta and Kurōmaru, Karin Yuuki is very devoted to Yukihime after having been saved by her in the past and is immediately jealous of Tōta's close relationship with her.^{Ch. 10} She often wears a schoolgirl uniform from Amano-Mihashira Academy after having infiltrated the school during a mission.^{Ch. 43, 44} She bears a tattoo on her back of the roman numeral XIII.^{Ch. 14} Her immortality is said to come from divine origin, as all her wounds heal instantly without scars.^{Ch. 14} Centuries ago, she was branded as a witch and hunted when she was a small child. Her name was Yseut Karin Orte^{Ch. 20}, her character being inspired on the biblical Judas Iscariot.^{Ch. 177} She later becomes the second person to form a pactio with Tōta.^{Ch. 155} Upon realizing her feelings for Tōta, Karin declares her love for him and the two have sexual intercourse after he reciprocates his feelings for her as well. ^{Ch. 182}
Ikkū Ameya (飴屋 一空, Ameya Ikkū)
Voiced by: Tetsuya Kakihara (Japanese); Adam Gibbs (English)
Contrary to the other members who achieved immortality through magical means, Ikkū Ameya obtained his by replacing almost all of his body with cybernetic implants,^{Ch. 32} which not only give him enhanced strength and speed but several types of weaponry at his disposal, including the "Al-Iskandariya Orbital Cannon" which used to be Chachamaru Karakuri's pactio weapon in Negima!. He can also change his appearance by just transferring himself to a different cybernetic body with other physical features.^{Vol. 5} He appears as a 24-year-old and claims to behave like a teenager, having entered a coma when he was 13 and being bedridden for 72 years before being given a cybernetic body. He is member number 10.^{Ch. 28, 32}
Jinbei Shishido (宍戸 甚兵衛, Shishido Jinbei)
Voiced by: Shunsuke Sakuya (Japanese); Jay Hickman (English)
Member number 2 of UQ Holder, Jinbei Shishido, is introduced as having dwelled in the tunnels under the facility for two years, after being sent there for having drunk Yukihime's wine stash and then inadvertently forgotten. He advises Tōta and Kurōmaru in dealing with the monsters.^{Ch. 7, 8} 1400 years ago, he achieved immortality by eating the flesh of a mermaid. Still, he has weak regenerative powers, resulting in numerous body scars. He is susceptible to being killed by crushing his head.^{Ch. 142} Despite his power and status within the organization, he's generally laid-back and has a reputation for being a slacker.
Kirië Sakurame (桜雨キリヱ, Sakurame Kirie)
Voiced by: Ai Kayano (Japanese); Amanda Lee (English)
Member number 9, Kirië Sakurame is the leading patron of UQ Holder, residing in the penthouse suite of the premises. Although she appears as a 12-year-old girl with orange blonde braided hair and glasses, she has lived much longer. Her ability is Reset and Restart, which allows her to rewind time, averting adverse events like her own death by returning to a specific instant in a time marked by save points.^{Vol. 4} She has also used this power to make a fortune in the stock market. She can also bring along a person she touches, either just their mind or their body as well.^{Ch. 36} Kirië badmouths Tōta due to their bad start on their first mission together, but becomes more friendly with him afterwards.^{Vol. 4} During an ambush by Ialda's forces, Kirie's ability is permanently sealed. ^{Ch. 176} To evade permanent death, Kirie moves into an alternate reality but eventually finds Dana and trades her agelessness for a way back to her homeworld. ^{Ch. 184} As she is now mortal, she ages into an adult by the time she meets Tōta again. Despite trying to avoid him, Tōta catches up to her and the pair have sexual intercourse after confessing their love for one another. She later reunites with her former UQ Holder comrades. ^{Ch. 185}
Santa Sasaki (佐々木 三太, Sasaki Santa)
Santa Sasaki is a student at Amano-Mihashira Academy City who lives as a hikkikomori (shut-in) in his dorm room, living off of real-money transactions in video games. He is aware of the UQ Holder members that infiltrated the school but is surprised that Tōta and Kurōmaru have become his roommates. As a Psion, Santa has several abilities that the UQ Holder members call "unique skills," including intangibility (going through walls and putting people through walls), telekinesis, flight, and possession. Having been bullied as a student, he had died. Nonetheless, he was turned into a revenant, a powerful, vengeful spirit, by his friend, a necromancer named Sayoko. Assisted by Tōta and his friends, Santa stops Sayoko's plan and restores her to her original self, but she passes away soon after. Santa then joins UQ Holder as member number 12.^{Ch. 43-56}
Vasago (バサゴ, Basago)
Voiced by: Tsubasa Yonaga (Japanese); Bryson Baugus (English)
A UQ Holder executive that Tōta and Kurōmaru meet.^{Ch. 7}

=== Negima characters ===
Some of the characters from the Negima series make appearances.

Fate Averruncus (フェイト・アーウェルンクス)
Voiced by: Akira Ishida (Japanese); Daman Mills (English)
Negi Springfield's main rival and comrade in the Negima series and is currently heralded as the greatest wizard in the Solar System. He leads "Ala Alba", the brigade Negi founded with his students. He opposes UQ Holder, claiming that Yukihime was responsible for Negi's disappearance, while UQ Holder regards him as its greatest enemy.^{Vol. 4} Fate claims that there is a way to save Negi and the entire Solar System by using Tōta,^{Vol. 4} but that he was also responsible for the death of Tōta's parents.^{Vol. 5} He sociopathically targets Tōta, killing anyone in the way.
Negi Springfield (ネギ・スプリングフィールド, Negi Supuringufīrudo)
Voiced by: Rina Satō (Japanese); Greg Ayres (English)
Tōta's grandfather. After his adventures in Negima, Negi helped his former teacher, Yukihime, form UQ Holder and made a name for himself in the magical world where he is known as "The Greatest Mage." At first, believed to be deceased, Fate later reveals that Negi is still alive though his whereabouts are unknown. Unlike his former master and grandson, Negi possesses a complete version of Magia Erebea. He is eventually revealed to have been possessed by the Mage of the Beginning, slowly locking away his soul and gaining control of his body. After Ialda takes control of Yukihime and subjects Tōta to the memories of her past, Tōta is given the ability to rescue one of Ialda's prisoners, and he chooses Negi. ^{Ch. 189} Negi and Tōta join forces to face Ialda and a corrupted Nagi. ^{Ch. 190}
In an alternate reality, Negi defeats Ialda without killing his father, thus preventing her from taking over his body. Seven years later, he marries Chisame Hasegawa, to whom he confessed his love during her graduation.
Mana Tatsumiya (龍宮 真名, Tatsumiya Mana)
Voiced by: Miho Sakuma (Japanese); Katelyn Barr (English)
One of Negi Springfield's former students, acting director of the Amano-Mihashira Academy, filling up for some "old friend of hers". She has dark skin and uses magic pistols to fight, able to defeat Tōta when they first meet. She appears fairly young as she ages much slower than a normal human.^{Vol. 7}
Nagi Springfield (ナギ・スプリングフィールド, Nagi Supuringufīrudo)
Voiced by: Takehito Koyasu (Japanese); Alan Brinks (English)
Negi's father and Tōta's great-grandfather. A legendary mage known as "The Thousand Master," he led the group "Ala Rubra" during the Great War a hundred years ago that was started by the Mage of the Beginning. He reappears in an illusion alongside his son, Negi, before UQ Holder members and Fate. It was later revealed that he was possessed by the Lifemaker, forcing his son, Negi, to defeat him and in turn become possessed himself, unlike what happened in the original dimension from Negima! in which Negi managed to defeat the Lifemaker while saving him in the process with Ala Alba's help, and he married Evangeline afterwards.
Ayaka Yukihiro (雪広 あやか, Yukihiro Ayaka)
Voiced by: Junko Minagawa (Japanese); Shelley Calene-Black, Cat Thomas (Young) (English)
One of Negi Springfield's former students and leader of the Yukihiro Conglomerate, she reappears now as an aged woman with her great-granddaughter, Mizore as guests of Yukihime. She meets with and becomes fond of Tōta due him being Negi's grandson. Ayaka also still possesses her pactio card that she made with Negi decades ago.
Chachamaru Karakuri (絡繰 茶々丸, Karakuri Chachamaru)
Voiced by: Akeno Watanabe (Japanese); Joanne Bonasso (English)
One of Negi Springfield's former students and partners who was once Yukihime's servant. She reappears alongside Ayaka, whom she is now in service of.
Sayo Aisaka (相坂 さよ, Aisaka Sayo)
Voiced by: Yuri Shiratori (Japanese); Kira Vincent-Davis (English)
One of Negi Springfield's former students and a ghost. Being a ghost, her appearance has remained unchanged in the following decades after the events of Negima. She reappears alongside Ayaka and Zazie to greet Tōta.
Zazie Rainyday (ザジ・レイニーデイ, Zaji Reinīdei)
Voiced by: Yuka Inokuchi (Japanese); Christina Kelly (English)
One of Negi Springfield's former students and the princess of the Demon Kind. Like Mana, she ages much slower than a normal human and has not changed much in terms of appearance. She appears before Tōta with Sayo and Ayaka to greet him.
Yue Ayase (綾瀬 夕映, Ayase Yue)
Voiced by: Natsuko Kuwatani (Japanese); Elissa Cuellar (English)
One of Negi Springfield's former students and partners known as Yue "The All-Knowing" and "The Magical Detective". Believed to have been killed in the previous war along with her best friend, Nodoka, Jack, and Albireo, the four reappear with Negi in front of UQ Holder to take Tōta away.
Nodoka Miyazaki (宮崎 のどか, Miyazaki Nodoka)
Voiced by: Mamiko Noto (Japanese); Sasha Paysinger (English)
One of Negi Springfield's former students and partners who was the most romantically involved with him of her class 70 years ago. Known in the magical world as Nodoka "The All-Perceiving" and "The Mind Reader". Believed to have been killed in the previous war along with her best friend, Yue, Jack, and Albireo, the four reappear with Negi in front of UQ Holder to take Tōta away.
Albireo Imma (アルビレオ・イマ, Arubireo Ima)
Voiced by: Daisuke Ono (Japanese); David Wald (English)
Also known as the "Librarian of a Thousand Faces, he was a former member of Ala Rubra with a high proficiency for gravity magic who took on the pseudonym "Ku:nel Sanders". It is said that his magical prowess is equal to that of Yukihime's. Believed to have been killed in the previous war along with Nodoka, Yue, and Jack, the four reappear with Negi in front of UQ Holder to take Tōta away.^{Ch. 127} Tota is using Imma's gravity blade.^{Ch. 38}
Jack Rakan (ジャック・ラカン, Jakku Rakan)
Voiced by: Rikiya Koyama (Japanese); John Swasey (English)
Also known as "Rakan of the Thousand Blades" and a former member of Ala Rubra was once considered a rival to Nagi Springfield. Believed to have been killed in the previous war along with Yue, Albireo, and Nodoka, the four reappear with Negi in front of UQ Holder to take Tōta away.
Asuna Kagurazaka (神楽坂 明日菜, Kagurazaka Asuna)
Voiced by: Akemi Kanda (Japanese); Luci Christian (English)
One of Negi's former students and his very first partner. She had a natural ability to cancel any magic, a trait transferred to Tōta, a clone created not only with Negi's abilities but also hers. It is said that she is already dead, but she appears in a flashback created by Albireo for Tōta to know all the truth and finally choose a side to support. She introduces herself to Tōta as his grandmother and ultimately helps him find the resolve to fight the Lifemaker-possessed Negi.
Albert Chamomile (アルベール・カモミール, Arubēru Kamomīru) / Chamo (カモ, Kamo)
An old, talking ermine and Negi's longtime friend, Negi entrusted him to watch over one of his workshops in Kyoto. He can transform into a human with high fighting prowess but still retains his perverted demeanor from his young days.
Ialda Baoth (ヨルダ・バオト, Yoruda Baoto)
Voiced by: Yuko Kaida (Japanese); Joanne Bonasso (English)
An immortal mage responsible for transforming Evangeline into a vampire 700 years ago and the instigator of the war on Inverse Mars a hundred years ago. Most famously, known as The Mage of the Beginning and The Lifemaker, she appears to have an interest in Touta. It's said that she is currently possessing Negi's body, just like she once possessed Nagi's body before he was destroyed by his son. Thus Fate looks desperately for a way to remove her from his body without killing him since then. At the same time, Yukihime seeks to uphold her promise to kill him should she ever obtain control of his body.

=== Other groups and characters ===
Shinobu Yuuki (結城 忍, Yūki Shinobu)
Voiced by: Sayaka Harada (Japanese); Tia Ballard (English)
A young girl Tōta befriends during his travels, Shinobu dreams of competing in the Neo Olympics as a racer.^{Ch. 2} Shinobu later reunites with Tōta at the UQ Holder Headquarters where she starts working as part of the staff. She is similar in name and appearance with Shinobu Maehara, a character from Akamatsu's work Love Hina.
Powerful Hand
Powerful Hand is a group of immortal hunter mercenaries working for the Private Military & Security Company (PMSCS). They include: Shion Nagumo (南雲士音, Nagumo Shion), a blind swordsman; Kaito (灰斗), a martial artist werewolf who taught Tota the shundo technique; and Chao Xinxai (超星仔),^{Vol. 3 profiles} a wizard specialist in shadow puppets.^{Ch. 20}
Sayoko
A schoolmate at Amano-Mihashira Academy, she was bullied by students and had died, turning into an onryō, a vengeful spirit. She is the cause of the murders on the campus, including the ones eight years before Santa and Tota's meeting. She is also the necromancer who turned her friend Santa into a revenant and gave him the Psion abilities. Hoping to get rid of the bullies and scum of society, she takes Santa's wishes by concocting a virus that leads to a worldwide zombie apocalypse.^{Ch. 48-56}
Dana Ananga Jagannatha (ダーナ・アナンガ・ジャガンナータ, Dāna Ananga Jagannāta)
Voiced by: Kimiko Saitō (Japanese); Monica Rial (English)
Also known as the Witch of the Rift (狭間の魔女, Hazama no Majo), she is a true, natural-born vampire, unlike Evangeline and Tōta, who obtained their vampiric traits by magic. Thus her powers are far greater, capable of instantly regenerating herself from any damage. Her powers allow her to perform higher feats, such as opening rifts in the space-time continuum. She was the master of a younger Evangeline, and they are not particularly on good terms. Later, she takes Tōta, Kirie, and Santa to train under her for a while.
Honoka Konoe (近衛 帆乃香, Konoe Honoka) and Isana Konoe (近衛 勇魚, Konoe Isana)
The granddaughters of Negi's former students Konoka Konoe and Setsuna Sakurazaki. They are part of Fate's new Ala Alba. They appear before Tōta, intending to convince him to join their ranks.
Mizore Yukihiro (雪広 みぞれ, Yukihiro Mizore)
Voiced by: Akari Kitō (Japanese); Juliet Simmons (English)
Great-granddaughter of Ayaka Yukihiro and heir to the Yukihiro Conglomerate who wishes to marry Tōta. Like Ayaka, Mizore has a very proud personality but is also kind at heart.
Tena Vita (テナ・ヴィタ, Vuīta Tena)
Voiced by: Rena Maeda (Japanese); Margaret McDonald (English)
Also known as Cutlass (カトラス, Katorasu), a mysterious girl who heralds herself as Tōta's sister but harbors a strong hatred towards him. She is armed with Ensis Exorcizans, the pactio weapon used by Asuna in Negima!, with the ability to exorcise demons and dispel magic, and in Cutlass' case, summon lightning magic, implying that she is an Asuna/Negi hybrid clone just like Tōta, albeit with incomplete powers. In Chapter 141, it was revealed that her birth name is Amater Magic Laboratory Immortal Experiment 17.

== Media ==
=== Manga ===
UQ Holder! is written and illustrated by Ken Akamatsu. It was first serialized in Kodansha's shōnen manga magazine Weekly Shōnen Magazine from August 28, 2013, to June 22, 2016. It was then transferred to the monthly manga magazine Bessatsu Shōnen Magazine, starting on October 8, 2016, and was renamed UQ Holder!: Magister Negi Magi! 2. The series ended on February 9, 2022. Kodansha has collected its 192 chapters into twenty-eight tankōbon volumes, with the first was released on December 17, 2013, while the final volume was released on March 9, 2022.

As the series is published in Japan, it is also released simultaneously in English digitally by Crunchyroll. The series is licensed for English language release in North America by Kodansha Comics, who published the first volume on March 18, 2014.

=== Anime ===
An anime adaptation of the manga was announced in Weekly Shōnen Magazine in June 2016, later revealed to be a television series and an Original Animation DVD (OAD). Youhei Suzuki directed the anime at J.C.Staff, with Akamatsu handling the series composition alongside Shogo Yasukawa. Egg Firm produced the series and the main cast from the original Negima! anime returned. The OAD was released on September 8, 2017, while the television series premiered on October 2, 2017. Two more OADs were released with the manga's 16th and 17th volumes. The series ran for 12 episodes.

Sentai Filmworks has licensed the series and simulcast the anime on Amazon's Anime Strike streaming channel in the U.S. and in other selected digital services elsewhere. A Blu-Ray version was released on November 27, 2018.

MVM Films acquired the series for home video release in the UK.

Madman Entertainment acquired the series for distribution in Australia and New Zealand, and simulcasted the series on AnimeLab.

==== Episodes ====
No.	Title	Original release date
1	"Beauty and the Boy" "Bijo to Shōnen" (美女と少年)	October 2, 2017
80 years after the events of Negima!, Tōta Konoe dreams of one day leaving the town where he lives in search of adventure. Nevertheless, his caretaker, Yukihime, forbids him to, until one day, when he learns the truth behind his origins and must give up his humanity to save Yukihime from a dangerous assailant.
2	"You Can't Hate Someone You Meet Naked" "Hadaka de deaeba Dachi ni naru" (裸で出会えば友達(ダチ)になる)	October 9, 2017
Tōta and Yukihime meet Kurōmaru Tokisaka, another immortal sent after them and convince him to join their side.
3	"Palace of the Immortals" "Fu shinin tachi no shiro" (不死人たちの城)	October 16, 2017
Tōta and Kurōmaru are taken to the headquarters of UQ Holder, a society of immortal beings created by Yukihime. However, they must undergo a special test first in order to join their ranks.
4	"Invasion of the Assassins" "Shikaku shūrai" (刺客襲来)	October 23, 2017
Tōta and Kurōmaru accompany Karin in their first mission as members of UQ Holder to protect the citizens from the nearby slums. While training a new ability, Tōta befriends a young man who lends him a hand, unaware that he is an enemy.
5	"Magia Erebea" "Magia Erebea" (闇の魔法(マギア・エレベア))	October 30, 2017
Tōta and his friends have a hard time against the Immortal Hunters. Just when Tōta is about to be defeated, a mysterious, dark power awakens, allowing him to fight back.
6	"Kurōmaru's Dark Days" "Kurōmaru wa kurō suru" (九郎丸は苦労する)	November 6, 2017
To finally confirm their feelings for Tōta, Kurōmaru disguises as a girl and invites him for a date, where they end up attacked by one of the enemies they previously faced.
7	"Reset and Restart" "Risetto & Risutāto" (リセット&リスタート)	November 13, 2017
Tōta meets Kirie Sakurame, another member of UQ Holder with the power to turn back time, and enlists his help to capture one of their enemies, Fate Averruncus, who once were a comrade of his grandfather.
8	"Operation: Capture Fate" "Feito hokaku sakusen" (フェイト捕獲作戦)	November 20, 2017
After a long battle, Tōta and the others manage to capture Fate. As they inquire about what he knows, Negi appears before them, much to their surprise.
9	"Love, Baths, and Vigorous Exercise" "Koi to o furo no hanpuku undō" (恋とお風呂の反復運動)	November 27, 2017
Following his encounter with Fate and Negi, Tōta meets Mizore Yukihiro, a descendant of Ayaka's who decides to take him as her husband by any means necessary.
10	"Welcome to Mahora Academy" "Mahora Gakuen e Yōkoso" (麻帆良学園へようこそ)	December 4, 2017
Still worried about Yukihime's revelations about his past, Tōta decides to enter the Mahora Fighting Tournament, where he is attacked by powerful enemies led by no other than Negi himself.
11	"Her Love Story" "Kanojo no Koi no Monogatari" (彼女の恋の物語)	December 11, 2017
Tōta and his friends are attacked by Ialda Baoth, an evil, powerful mage possessing Negi's body, until Asuna appears to help them prepare a plan to fight back.
12	"Adeat! Everlasting Love" "Adeatto! Tsuki Senu Omoi" (来れ(アデアット)! 尽きせぬ想い)	December 18, 2017
Tōta and his friends hold Negi and his companions long enough for Asuna's plan to work, forcing Ialda Baoth to retreat. After the battle, Tōta swears to save his grandfather in their next encounter and declares his love for Yukihime, much to everyone else's astonishment.

==== OVAs ====
No.	Title	Original release date
OVA–1	"Amor Primus〜First Love〜" "amor primus〜Hatsukoi〜" (amor primus〜初恋〜)	September 8, 2017
OVA–2	"Eternal First Kiss in a Moment" "Setsuna de Eien no First Kiss" (刹那で永遠なファースト・キッス)	March 9, 2018
OVA–3	"Karin Senpai's Secret That Can't Be Spoken" "Karin-Senpai no Ienai Himitsu" (夏凜先輩の言えないヒミツ♥)	June 8, 2018

== Notes ==
- "Ch." is an abbreviation of "chapter" and refers to a chapter number of the collected UQ Holder! manga
- "Ep." is an abbreviation of "episode" and refers to an episode number of the UQ Holder! anime
