= Nil Admirari no Tenbin =

2018 Japanese anime series

- Key visual

ニル・アドミラリの天秤
- Genre: Dark fantasy; Harem
- Anime television series
- Directed by: Masahiro Takata
- Written by: Tomoko Konparu
- Music by: Tomoki Hasegawa
- Studio: Zero-G
- Licensed by: Crunchyroll (Note: In North America (formerly known as Funimation), Australia via Crunchyroll Store Australia (formerly Madman Anime) and Europe via Crunchyroll EMEA.)
- Original network: Tokyo MX, Sun TV, AT-X, BS Fuji
- Original run: April 8, 2018 – June 24, 2018
- Episodes: 12
- Related
- Nil Admirari no Tenbin: Teito Genwaku Kitan (video game, 2016)
- icon

Nil Admirari no Tenbin (Note: Japanese: ニル・アドミラリの天秤, Hepburn: Niru Adomirari no Tenbin; lit. "Libra of Nil Admirari") is a 2018 Japanese dark fantasy anime television series based on a video game of the same name created and developed by Otomate for PlayStation Vita. The series is directed by Masahiro Takata at Zero-G, written by Tomoko Konparu, character design and chief animation direction by Yukie Sakō, and music composed by Tomoki Hasegawa. The series was broadcast on Tokyo MX, Sun TV and BS Fuji from April to June 2018.

== Premise ==
A young woman agrees to an arranged marriage with a man she does not know in hopes of protecting her family. Before she does so, her younger brother attempts suicide while holding an old book. She is approached by two members of the Imperial Library Information Assets Management Bureau, also known as "Fukurō", who tell her that a book may the cause of the cause, noting that there are books, called Maremono, which greatly influence their readers to engage in self-harm. She begins to see an "aura" the books emit and decides, after some debate, to join the Bureau, assisting them in their duties, leaving behind her old life.

== Characters ==
- Juri Kimura as Tsugumi Kuze, name of unvoiced protagonist in the original video game. In this series, she believes it is her fault that her brother, Hitaki attempted suicide, but later learns that a book is responsible, and she later joins the Imperial Library Information Assets Management Bureau.
- Ayumu Murase as Hitaki Kuze, younger brother of Tsugami who attempts suicide.
- Rio Natsuki as Shiori Tokimiya, a supervisor at the Imperial Library Information Assets Management Bureau, who scouts out Tsugami.
- Norio Kobayashi as Keizaburō Ōchi, the family servant of the Kuze family who helps Tsugami and tries to comfort her after her brother's attempted suicide.
- Yuki Kaji as Hayato Ozaki, a member of the Imperial Library Information Assets Management Bureau who tells Tsugami that her brother's attempted suicide was caused by a cursed book. After learning of her power to see the aura of Maremono, he attempts to recruit her to the Bureau.
- Nobuhiko Okamoto as Akira Kōgami, a colleague of Hayato, who goes with him to tell Tsugami that a book may have caused her brother to attempt suicide.
- Ryōta Ōsaka as Hisui Hoshikawa, a member of the Imperial Library Information Assets Management Bureau, who has superpowers.
- Ryohei Kimura as Shōgo Ukai, a law school student and son of the country's prime minister, Shozo Ukai, who attempted suicide due to effects from a Maremono.
- Kenichi Suzumura as Shizuru Migiwa, a well-known romance novelist who lives in an Owl apartment, along with Shogo, and is somewhat of a playboy.
- Takahiro Sakurai as Rui Sagisawa, a student at the country's imperial academy, who has a scholarship, and often reads at the library or a cafe.

== Episodes ==
No.	Title	Direction	Screenplay	Animation direction	Original release date
1	"The Glow of the Cursed Tome"; Transliteration: "Mare mono no kirameki -aura-" (Japanese: 稀モノの煌き -アウラ-)	Masahiro Takata	Tomoko Konparu	Hitoshi Ueda	April 8, 2018
In an alternate universe, where the Taisho era ended in 1936, Tsugumi Kuze agrees to an arranged marriage to save her family, but her brother commits suicide afterwards. Before she can make sense of the situation, two Imperial Library Information Assets Management Bureau agents, Hayato Ozaki and Akira Kōgami, appear before her, asking about a mysterious book called Maremono.
2	"The Imperial Library Intelligence Assets Management Bureau -Fukurō-"; Transliteration: "Teikoku toshi jōhō shisan kanri-kyoku -fukurō-" (Japanese: 帝国図書情報資産管理局 -フクロウ-)	Masaki Utsunomiya	Masahiro Takata	Tomoyuki Kitamura, Kazuhiko Yokota	April 15, 2018
Tsugumi gets acquainted with the Imperial Library Information Assets Management Bureau and its members, along with romance novelist Shizuru Migiwa. She begins living on the compound, after supervisor Shiori Tokimiya shows her around the building. Later, she goes out with Hayato, Akira, and Hisui Hoshikawa on patrol, looking for cursed books, and is disappointed she finds none.
3	"Those Who Take the Name of the God of Flames -Kagutsuchi-"; Transliteration: "Homura no Kami o Nanoru Mono -Kagutsuchi-" (Japanese: 焔の神を名乗る者 -カグツチ-)	Daiji Iwanaga	Masahiro Takata	Yū Kaneshiro, Yukie Ishibashi	April 22, 2018
Tsugumi is adjusting to her life inside the Imperial Library Information Assets Management Bureau campus and going on patrols with other members. One evening, when having an evening with four of them, they chase men who say they are burning a book. Tsugumi comes across a doctor-in-training named Sagisawa Rui. They have a debriefing headed by Shiori Tokimiya and learn a group of men called "Kagutsuchi" have been behind recent incidents. Later, she and the other agents enter a building where this group is holed out, and conduct a raid. Tsugumi comes face-to-face with Sagisawa and refuses to go with him to burn books deemed "dangerous."
4	"Nightingale Ball -Nachtigal-"; Transliteration: "Sayonakidori no Budōkai -Nahtigaru-" (Japanese: 小夜啼鳥の舞踏会 -ナハティガル-)	Atsuko Tonomizu	Tomoko Konparu	Hiroyuki Ochi, Saburo Takada	April 29, 2018
Tsugumi meets the pompous son of the Prime Minister, Ukai. He later annoys everyone on the compound by playing his record player loudly and is told there are rules to living there that he has to follow. Kijitani Arata, his assistant, introduces himself. Tsugumi sympathizes with him, seeing a parallel to what happened to her brother. She learns that a legislator jumped from a building, and died, with a tome in one hand. She meets the head of a local newspaper, who provides information to the Bureau. Later, she goes to a ball with Ukai to learn about possible individuals there which may be connected to book burning incidents. In a final scene, a woman is shown lying on the ground, dead, with a tome nearby.
5	"Akatsuki Evening -Lilac-"; Transliteration: "Karenai Tsukinoyo -Rairakku-" (Japanese: 紅月の夜 -ライラック-)	Kenichiro Komatani	Masahiro Yokotani	Yoshitaka Yasuda, Masayuki Fujita, Kazuhiko Yokota	May 6, 2018
6	"Mother's Face -Kingfisher-"; Transliteration: "Hana no omokage -Kawasemi-" (Japanese: 母の俤 -カワセミ-)	Daiji Iwanaga	Tomoko Konparu	Atsushi Mori, Jōji Yanase, Wakako Yoshida, Yukie Ishibashi	May 13, 2018
7	"Movie Theater After the Rain -Tears-"; Transliteration: "Amefuri eigakan -Namida-" (Japanese: 雨降り映畫館 -ナミダ-)	Masaki Utsunomiya	Motofumi Nakajō	Tomoyuki Kitamura	May 20, 2018
8	"The Colors of the Flames of Love -Tragedy-"; Transliteration: "Koihi no Aya -Higeki-" (Japanese: 恋火の彩 -ヒゲキ-)	Naoki Murata	Masahiro Yokotani	Hiroshi Matsumoto, Taichi Nakaguma, Hirotaka Nii	May 27, 2018
9	"Dance of the Evil Bird -Karasu-"; Transliteration: "Kyō tori ranbu -Karasu-" (Japanese: 凶鳥乱舞 -カラス-)	Sumito Sasaki	Tomoko Konparu	Atsushi Kashiwa, Maiko Ebisawa, Shōko Maruyama	June 3, 2018
10	"White-Walled Birdcage -Trauma-"; Transliteration: "Hakua no torikage -Torauma-" (Japanese: 白亜の鳥籠 -トラウマ-)	Taiji Kawanishi	Masahiro Yokotani	Yoko Ono	June 10, 2018
11	"Mother, Father and Child -Bond-"; Transliteration: "Haha to chantoko to -Kizuna-" (Japanese: 母と父と子と -キズナ-)	Daiji Iwanaga	Tomoko Konparu	Kazuhiko Yokota, Masayuki Fujita, Yoshitaka Yasuda	June 17, 2018
12	"Bewitching Tales of the Imperial Capital -Nil Admirari-"; Transliteration: "Teito Genwaku Kitan -Niru Adomirari-" (Japanese: 帝都幻惑綺譚 -ニル・アドミラリ-)	Masahiro Takata	Tomoko Konparu	Tomoyuki Kitamura, Yoshitaka Yasuda	June 24, 2018

== Production ==
In July 2016, the anime adaptation was announced, as well as the game's sequel. In September 2017, the teaser video for the series was released, as was the cast and crew. This included Masahiro Takata as director at studio Zero-G, Tomoko Konparu overseeing the scripts for the series, Yukie Sakō as character designer, and Tomoki Hasegawa as music composer at Pony Canyon. The series released on April 1, 2018, on Tokyo MX and Sun TV. The series premiered in late April on BS Fuji and AT-X, and begin streaming on the d Anime Store.

The opening theme is "Tandeki Miragism" (耽溺ミラアジュイズム, Tandeki Mirājuizumu; lit. "Indulgence Miragism") by Kradness, and the ending theme is "Black Thunder" by Hiro Shimono.

== Reception ==
=== Critical reception ===
The series had a mixed reception.. Rebecca Silverman of Anime News Network gave the series a solid B rating, and stated "It's a dark story, but one with interesting aspects and an engaging vocal cast, and one that's really worth checking out". Paul Jensen, Theron Martin, Nick Creamer, and Rebecca Silverman reviewed the first episode for the ANN Spring 2018 preview guide. Jensen argued that the episode has a "whiplash-inducing tonal swing" and a solid entry in the genre, with decent writing and "an intriguing premise", while Martin called it a "period piece" which is a "reverse harem", and a "middling show", and Creamer called it an "extremely average" series, which has a "pretty standard" narrative. In contrast, Silverman praised the series, calling in a "much darker version" of Märchen Mädchen, with handwritten books having special powers, and called it a good start for fans of reverse harem stories who "also enjoy the power of a good book."
