= Tomoki Hasegawa =

Japanese composer, arranger & producer (born 1957)

Tomoki Hasegawa 長谷川 智樹
- Born: 19 July 1957 (age 69); Osaka Prefecture, Japan
- Genres: Anime song
- Occupations: Composer; arranger; producer

Tomoki Hasegawa (Japanese: 長谷川 智樹, Hepburn: Hasegawa Tomoki; born 19 July 1957) is a Japanese composer and arranger of music from Osaka Prefecture, Japan, best known for his work on anime soundtracks. He has also done sound production work on albums for Mayumi Iizuka.

== Works ==
=== Anime ===
- Pygmalio (opening and ending themes arrangement, 1990–1991)
- Locke the Superman: New World Command (1991)
- Magical Princess Minky Momo (2nd series, 1991)
- Legend of the Galactic Heroes: Golden Wings (1992)
- Genki Bakuhatsu Ganbaruger (1992–1993)
- Jeanie with the Light Brown Hair (opening theme, 1992–1993)
- Mikan Enikki (1992–1993)
- Nekketsu Saikyō Go-Saurer (1993–1994)
- Wedding Peach (1995–1996)
- Starship Girl Yamamoto Yohko (first OVA series, 1996)
- Tenchi in Tokyo (ending theme 2, 1997)
- D.N.Angel (2003)
- DearS (2004)
- Gokusen (2004)
- Kujibiki Unbalance (second stage, 2006)
- Dōbutsu no Mori (2006)
- Nana (2006–2007)
- Sayonara, Zetsubou-Sensei (2007)
- Majin Tantei Nōgami Neuro (2007–2008)
- Quiz Magic Academy (2008)
- (Zoku) Sayonara, Zetsubou-Sensei (2008)
- Cookin' Idol I! My! Mine! (2009)
- Mysterious Girlfriend X (2012)
- Locodol (2014)
- Libra of Nil Admirari (2018)
- Cherry Magic! Thirty Years of Virginity Can Make You a Wizard?! (2024)
- Grandpa and Grandma Turn Young Again (2024)
- Dekin no Mogura (2025)
- Pardon the Intrusion, I'm Home! (2026)

=== Films ===
- Crêpe (1993)
- Shura ga Yuku 6: Tōhoku Gekitōhen (1997)
- The Summer of Dioxin (2001)
- Suicide Club (2002)
- Noriko's Dinner Table (2005)
- Exte (2007)
- Yes, No, or Maybe? (2020)

=== TV programs ===
- Nameshite Gatten (NHK, 1995)

=== Video games ===
- Gradius III (arrangement, 1989, soundtrack released in 1990)
- Rise of the Phoenix (Koei, 1995)
- Romance of the Three Kingdoms VII (Koei, 2000)

=== Sound production ===
Hasegawa did sound production work on one or more songs from these albums.

Mayumi Iizuka

- Kata Omoi (1997)
- Minto to Kuchibue (1998)
- Fly Ladybird Fly (1998)
- So Loving (1999)
- Aeris (2000)
- Himawari (2001)
- Niji no Saku Basho (2002)
- SMILE×SMILE (2003)
- ∞Infinity∞ (2004)
- Mine (2005)
- 10LOVE (2006)
- Crystal Days (2007)
- Stories (2008)
- Fight!! (2009)
- Kimi e... (2009)
