= Ai Kayano =

Japanese voice actress (born 1987)

- 茅野 愛衣
- Born: September 13, 1987 (age 39); Tokyo, Japan
- Occupation: Voice actress
- Years active: 2010–present
- Agent: Office Osawa
- Height: 153 cm (5 ft 0 in)

Ai Kayano (茅野 愛衣, Kayano Ai; born September 13, 1987) is a Japanese voice actress. A former member of Pro-Fit, she is a member of Office Osawa. She had leading roles in several anime series, including Meiko "Menma" Honma in Anohana, Inori Yuzuriha in Guilty Crown, Alice Zuberg in Sword Art Online: Alicization, Utaha Kasumigaoka in Saekano, Mashiro Shiina in The Pet Girl of Sakurasou, Saori Takebe in Girls und Panzer, Shiro in No Game No Life, Darkness in KonoSuba, Juliet Persia in Boarding School Juliet, and Mamako Oosuki in Do You Love Your Mom and Her Two-Hit Multi-Target Attacks?. She has also performed opening, ending, and insert theme songs for each series.

== Biography ==
Kayano wanted to work in a job that would involve "healing people", leading to initially take up a course at a vocational school. She worked at the beauty industry, and became interested in acting after watching Aria. While attending school, she continued working in the industry and paid for her tuition.

Kayano joined Pro-Fit in 2010, starring in the original video animation Princess Resurrection. She also voiced a number of background roles in the anime series A Certain Magical Index II, voicing Itsuwa. She voiced Meiko "Menma" Honma in Anohana. Kayano, Haruka Tomatsu, and Saori Hayami performed the series' ending theme "Secret Base – Kimi ga Kureta Mono (10 years after Ver.)", a cover of a song originally sung by the band Zone. Kayano won the Best Newcomer Award at the 6th Seiyu Awards. She voiced Inori Yuzuriha in Guilty Crown.

Kayano voiced Mayaka Ibara in Hyouka. She and Satomi Satō performed the series' ending themes "Madoromi no Yakusoku" (まどろみの約束) and "Kimi ni Matsuwaru Mystery" (君にまつわるミステリー). Kayano voiced Mashiro Shiina in The Pet Girl of Sakurasou, Saori Takebe in Girls und Panzer, Ai Fuyuumi in Oreshura, Chisaki Hiradaira in Nagi-Asu: A Lull in the Sea, and Shiro in No Game No Life. She performed the series' ending theme "Oración". She left Pro-Fit and became a freelancer in 2014. She joined Office Osawa in 2015. She voiced Megumi Sakura in School-Live!, Utaha Kasumigaoka in Saekano, Darkness in KonoSuba, Chizuru Hishiro in ReLIFE, Rin Tōyama in New Game!, Kirie Sakurame in UQ Holder!, Shuvi in No Game No Life: Zero, and Juliet Persia in Boarding School Juliet.

In 2016, Kayano began hosting a show titled "Kayanomi ~Kayano Ai ga Nihonshu wo Nominagara, Taberu dake~~" (かやのみ 〜茅野愛衣が日本酒をのみながら、食べるだけ〜; lit. "Kayanomi ~Ai Kayano is Eating While Drinking Sake~") at Animate Times' YouTube channel. The show focuses on her looking through into various types of sake. The title of show is also a combination of her surname Kayano and the Japanese word for "drink", which is "nomi" (飲み).

== Controversy ==
In 2021, controversy arose on Chinese social media as a result of Kayano's post regarding her February 11 trip to the Yasukuni Shrine. It contains a subject of controversies about Japanese soldiers who died in numerous wars involving Japan spanning between the Meiji and Showa eras, including 1,068 convicted war criminals who were executed by the International Military Tribunal; of which fourteen of them, including former Japanese Prime Minister Hideki Tojo, are labeled as A-Class criminals. In response, her voice lines were removed in the Chinese version of Azur Lane and Girls' Frontline. Similar action was also taken in other games such as the removal of Kayano's voice lines in Guns Girl Z, Punishing: Gray Raven, and the Chinese version of Arknights, where she was replaced by Miku Itō and Mizuki Kitajima for all servers in 2021 in the latter two games.

== Filmography ==
=== Anime ===
List of voice performances in anime
Year	Name	Character	Notes	Source
2010	Durarara!!	Maomin まおみん		
2010	A Certain Magical Index II	Itsuwa, Vera	Also III	
2010	Princess Resurrection	Sawawa Hiyorimi, Mermaid	OVA eps. 13–14, 16	
2011	Dream Eater Merry	Isana Tachibana		
2011	Freezing	Violet el Bridget	2 seasons	
2011	Hanasaku Iroha	Student B		
2011	Sket Dance	Roman Saotome		
2011	Anohana	Meiko "Menma" Honma		
2011	Ro-Kyu-Bu!	Tae Mishōji		
2011	Heaven's Memo Pad	Ayaka Shinozaki		
2011	Sacred Seven	Ai メイド隊アイ		
2011	Kamisama Dolls	Hibino Shiba		
2011	Nekogami Yaoyorozu	Sasana Shōsōin	Also OVA in 2012	
2011	Kimi to Boku	Rika Takahashi	2 seasons	
2011	Last Exile: Fam, The Silver Wing	Millia Il Velch Cutrettola Turan		
2011	Shakugan no Shana III: Final	Chiara Toscana		
2011	Ben-To	Ume Shiraume		
2011	Guilty Crown	Inori Yuzuriha, Mana Ouma		
2011	Chihayafuru	Kanade Ōe	3 seasons	
2012	夢想夏郷, 東方 (Touhou Musou Kakyou / A Summer Day's Dream)	Yuyuko Saigyouji		
2012	Bodacious Space Pirates	Ai Hoshimiya		
2012	Lagrange: The Flower of Rin-ne	Muginami	2 seasons	
2012	Aquarion Evol	Mikono Suzushiro		
2012	Waiting in the Summer	Kaori Kinoshita		
2012	''Kokon ~ We became animation! ~''	Satsuki Hatsuki 初狩さつき		
2012	Medaka Box	Mogana Kikaijima	2 seasons	
2012	Natsuiro Kiseki	Chiharu Okiyama		
2012	Hyouka	Mayaka Ibara		
2012	Muv-Luv Alternative: Total Eclipse	Origa Prakina		
2012	Tari Tari	Fumiko Matsumoto, Tomoka Kurata		
2012	Love, Election and Chocolate	Mao Shigemori		
2012	Code Geass: Akito the Exiled	Anna Clément	OVA series	
2012	Zettai Junpaku: Mahō Shōjo	Yui Niita	OVA	
2012	Say "I love you"	Mei Tachibana		
2012	Girls und Panzer	Saori Takebe		
2012	The Pet Girl of Sakurasou	Mashiro Shiina		
2012	Psycho-Pass	Yoshika Okubo		
2013	Mangirl!	Shinobu Fujimori		
2013	Ai Mai Mi	Ponoka-senpai	3 seasons	
2013	Oreshura	Ai Fuyuumi		
2013	Senran Kagura	Yomi	2 seasons	
2013	Senyuu	Ruki	2 seasons	
2013	Jewelpet Happiness	Teacher Azusa, Teacher Arisa		
2013	Gargantia on the Verdurous Planet	Saaya		
2013	Yuyushiki	Chiho Aikawa		
2013	Valvrave the Liberator	Aina Sakurai, Pino	2 seasons	
2013	Dog & Scissors	Momiji Himehagi		
2013	Tamayura: More Aggressive	Kanae Mitani		
2013	Servant × Service	Lucy Yamagami		
2013	Stella Women's Academy, High School Division Class C3	Karila Hatsuse		
2013	Senki Zesshō Symphogear G	Kirika Akatsuki		
2013	Ro-Kyu-Bu! SS	Tae Mishōji		
2013	Super Seisyun Brothers	Mako Saitō		
2013	Nagi-Asu: A Lull in the Sea	Chisaki Hiradaira		
2013	Golden Time	Nana Hayashida "Linda"		
2013	Infinite Stratos 2	Madoka Orimura		
2013	Strike the Blood	Misaki Sasasaki		
2013	Yozakura Quartet: Hana no Uta	V Lila F		
2013	Unbreakable Machine-Doll	Irori		
2014	Witchcraft Works	Kasumi Takamiya		
2014	Romantica Clock	Akane Kajiya 加治屋 杏花音		
2014	Sgt. Frog	Akira Kim 金阿弥明		
2014	selector infected WIXOSS	Hitoe Uemura	Also spread	
2014	The World Is Still Beautiful	Nia Lemercier		
2014	Captain Earth	Hana Mutō		
2014	Lady Jewelpet	Momona's mother		
2014	GO-GO Tamagotchi!	Yukine		
2014	If Her Flag Breaks	Akane Mahōgasawa		
2014	Black Bullet	Blind Girl		
2014	No Game No Life	Shiro		
2014	Is the Order a Rabbit?	Mocha Hoto	2 seasons	
2014	Glasslip	Momo Shirosaki		
2014	Aldnoah.Zero	Darzana Magbaredge	2 seasons	
2014	Blue Spring Ride	Yuri Makita		
2014	Terra Formars	Sheila Levitt		
2014	Lord Marksman and Vanadis	Sofya "Sofy" Obertas		
2014	Wolf Girl and Black Prince	Ayumi Sanda		
2014	Celestial Method	Kaori Komiya		
2014	Gundam Build Fighters Try	Eri Shinoda		
2014	Shirobako	Mui Kayana, Rinko Ogasawara, Arupin		
2014	Your Lie in April	Nagi Aiza		
2014	Girl Friend Beta	Haruko Yumesaki		
2015	Absolute Duo	Silent Diva		
2015	Miritari!	Cecilie		
2015	Saekano	Utaha Kasumigaoka	2 seasons	
2015	Food Wars: Shokugeki no Soma	Ryōko Sakaki	4 seasons	
2015	Is It Wrong to Try to Pick Up Girls in a Dungeon?	Asfi Al Andromeda	3 seasons Also Sword Oratoria	
2015	Rin-ne	Suzu Minami		
2015	Show by Rock!!	Tsukino		
2015	Ghost in the Shell: Arise – Alternative Architecture	Emma Tsuda		
2015	Mikagura School Suite	Kurumi Narumi		
2015	My Love Story!!	Yukika Amami		
2015	Senran Kagura: Estival Versus – Festival Eve Full of Swimsuits	Yomi	OVA	
2015	Fairy Tail	Kyōka		
2015	Castle Town Dandelion	Aoi Sakurada		
2015	Ushio and Tora	Omamori	2 seasons	
2015	Senki Zesshō Symphogear GX	Kirika Akatsuki		
2015	School-Live!	Megumi Sakura		
2015	Aria the Avvenire	Anya Dostoyevskaya	OVA	
2015	Kindaichi Case Files R Season 2	Sayaka Yukihara		
2015	Aria the Scarlet Ammo AA	Shino Sasaki		
2015	Magical Somera-chan	Konomi, Cat, Menūsū		
2015	Crayon Shin-chan	Kusakabe yellow <Hoshino Yuri> カスカベイエロー〈星野ユリ〉		
2016	Girls Beyond the Wasteland	Kosaka (Bitch Queen)		
2016	Luck & Logic	Shiori Tsurugi		
2016	Rainbow Days	Nozomi Matsunaga		
2016	KonoSuba	Darkness	3 seasons	
2016	Flying Witch	Chito		
2016	Magi: Adventure of Sinbad	Serendine		
2016	ReLIFE	Chizuru Hishiro	Also OVA in 2018	
2016	First Love Monster	Mafuyu Hayashi		
2016	The Heroic Legend of Arslan: Dust Storm Dance	Irina		
2016	Tales of Zestiria the X	Alisha Diphda	2 seasons	
2016	The Disastrous Life of Saiki K.	Kokomi Teruhashi	2 seasons & ONA	
2016	New Game!	Rin Toyama	2 seasons	
2016	Sweetness and Lightning	Tae Inuzuka		
2016	Taboo Tattoo	Kujuri		
2016	Amanchu!	Futaba Ooki	2 seasons	
2016	Mob Psycho 100	Chihiro		
2016	Danganronpa 3: The End of Hope's Peak High School	Mikan Tsumiki	Despair arc	
2016	Flip Flappers	Mimi		
2016	March Comes in like a Lion	Akari Kawamoto	2 seasons	
2016	Tawawa on Monday	Junior		
2017	Urara Meirocho	Nina Natsume		
2017	Hand Shakers	Lily		
2017	Twin Angel Break	Sumire Kisaragi / Angel Sapphire		
2017	Senki Zesshō Symphogear AXZ	Kirika Akatsuki		
2017	Altair: A Record of Battles	Armut Ayşe		
2017	UQ Holder! Magister Negi Magi! 2	Kirie Sakurame		
2017	Infini-T Force	Emi Kaidou		
2017	Land of the Lustrous	Diamond		
2018	Record of Grancrest War	Marrine Kreische		
2018	How to Keep a Mummy	Kaede Kashiwagi		
2018	Inazuma Eleven	Umihara Norika	2 seasons	
2018	A.I.C.O. -Incarnation-	Maho Shiraishi		
2018	Lost Song	Corte, Mel		
2018	Lord of Vermilion: The Crimson King	Shōko Hanashima		
2018	Doraemon	Nana (Doraemon Birthday Special 2018 : A Whale and Mystery of Pipe Island)		
2018	Bloom Into You	Sayaka Saeki		
2018	Boarding School Juliet	Juliet Persia		
2018	Sword Art Online: Alicization	Alice Zuberg		
2018	Million Arthur	Pharsalia	2 seasons	
2019	Isekai Quartet	Darkness		
2019	Miru Tights	Yuiko Okuzumi	ONA	
2019	Senki Zesshō Symphogear XV	Kirika Akatsuki		
2019	Do You Love Your Mom and Her Two-Hit Multi-Target Attacks?	Mamako Oosuki		
2019	Demon Slayer: Kimetsu no Yaiba	Kanae Kocho		
2019	Azur Lane	Kaga, Atago, Renown		
2019	True Cooking Master Boy	Mei Li		
2020	Somali and the Forest Spirit	Hazel		
2020	Smile Down the Runway	Kokoro Hasegawa		
2020	A Destructive God Sits Next to Me	Kotoko Sumiso		
2020	Cagaster of an Insect Cage	Aisha		
2020	Super HxEros	Maihime Shirayuki		
2020	Warlords of Sigrdrifa	Rusalka Evereska		
2020	Noblesse	Seira J. Loyard		
2020	Adachi and Shimamura	Tarumi		
2020	Dragon Quest: The Adventure of Dai	Soala		
2021	Otherside Picnic	Toriko Nishina		
2021	Suppose a Kid from the Last Dungeon Boonies Moved to a Starter Town	Marie		
2021	Bottom-tier Character Tomozaki	Fūka Kikuchi	2 seasons	
2021	Horimiya	Yuriko Hori	Also The Missing Pieces	
2021	Mushoku Tensei: Jobless Reincarnation	Sylphiette		
2021	The Case Study of Vanitas	Dominique de Sade		
2021	The Great Jahy Will Not Be Defeated!	Store Manager		
2021	Pokémon Evolutions	Lillie	ONA	
2021	Platinum End	Baret		
2022	Delicious Party Pretty Cure	Amane Kasai / Gentle / Cure Finale		
2022	My Stepmom's Daughter Is My Ex	Yuni Irido		
2023	Reborn as a Vending Machine, I Now Wander the Dungeon	Filmina		
2023	Reign of the Seven Spellblades	Ophelia Salvadori		
2024	'Tis Time for "Torture," Princess	Giant		
2024	Mayonaka Punch	Yuki		
2024	VTuber Legend: How I Went Viral After Forgetting to Turn Off My Stream	Kaeru Yamatani		
2024	Delico's Nursery	Frieda Delico		
2024	Tower of God Season 2	Ron Mei		
2025	Possibly the Greatest Alchemist of All Time	Sofia Sylphid		
2025	Beyblade X	Joka Manju		
2025	Sword of the Demon Hunter: Kijin Gentōshō	Ofū		
2025	The Mononoke Lecture Logs of Chuzenji-sensei	Chizuko Chuzenji		
2025	From Old Country Bumpkin to Master Swordsman	Rose Marblehart		
2025	Secrets of the Silent Witch	Claudia		
2025	Cultural Exchange with a Game Centre Girl	Momoko Mochizuki		
2025	Dealing with Mikadono Sisters Is a Breeze	Subaru Ayase		
2025	Dusk Beyond the End of the World	Towasa Ōmaki		
2025	Backstabbed in a Backwater Dungeon	Sasha		
2025	Tojima Wants to Be a Kamen Rider	Yuriko Okada		
2026	A Misanthrope Teaches a Class for Demi-Humans	Yuki Saotome		
2026	Medalist 2nd Season	Marika Kurione		
2026	Magical Sisters LuluttoLilly	Azuki		
2026	A Hundred Scenes of Awajima	Ryōko Ueda		
2026	Grow Up Show: Sunflower Circus	Rin Mamiya		
2026	The Insipid Prince's Furtive Grab for the Throne	Mitsuba		
2026	Though I Am an Inept Villainess	Shu Gabi		
2026	Yu-Gi-Oh! Card Game The Chronicles	Artemis		
2026	The Seven Knights of the Marronnier Kingdom	Birgitta		
2027	Gacha Girls Corps	Shisuha Alvy		
2027	Mercedes and the Waning Moon	Ryudia		

=== Film ===
List of voice performances in feature films
Year	Title	Role	Notes	Source
2011	Ban'nō yasai nin'ninman	Kazumi Ishino		
2013	Anohana	Meiko "Menma" Honma		
2014	Bodacious Space Pirates: Abyss of Hyperspace	Ai Hoshimiya		
2014	Tales of Zestiria: Dawn of the Shepherd	Alisha Diphda		
2015	Tamayura ~Sotsugyō Shashin~	Kanae Mitani	Film series	
2015	Girls und Panzer der Film	Saori Takebe		
2016	Garakowa: Restore the World	Sumire		
2016	selector destructed WIXOSS	Hitoe Uemura	Compilation film	
2017	No Game No Life: Zero	Shuvi		
2017	Girls und Panzer das Finale: Part 1	Saori Takebe		
2018	Maquia: When the Promised Flower Blooms	Leilia		
2019	Girls und Panzer das Finale: Part 2	Saori Takebe		
2019	KonoSuba: God's Blessing on This Wonderful World! Legend of Crimson	Darkness		
2019	Saekano the Movie: Finale	Utaha Kasumigaoka		
2020	Shirobako: The Movie	Rinko Ogasawara		
2020	Fate/stay night: Heaven's Feel III. spring song	Claudia Hortensia		
2020	Kono Sekai no Tanoshimikata: Secret Story Film	Mayu Uchida		
2021	Aria the Crepusculo	Anya Dostoyevskaya		
2021	Girls und Panzer das Finale: Part 3	Saori Takebe		
2023	Girls und Panzer das Finale: Part 4	Saori Takebe		
2026	Girls und Panzer: Motto Love Love Sakusen Desu!	Saori Takebe	Film series	

=== Video games ===
List of voice performances in video games
Year	Title	Role	Notes	Source
2008	Momo Taisen Papers 桃色大戦ぱいろん	Actor 紗優	PC (general)	
2010	Class of Heroes 2G	A parane パーネ	PS3	
2010	Class of Heroes 3	Katja, Jakotsu, Elf (female) カーチャ/ジャコツ/エルフ（女）	PSP	
2011	A Certain Magical Index	Itsuwa	PSP	
2011	Senran Kagura: Skirting Shadows	Yomi	DS	
2011	Dead end Orchestral Manoeuvres in the Dead End デッドエンド Orchestral Manoeuvres in the Dead End	Teizuka Isho 手塚酉穂	PSP	
2011	Yufu company Brave Company 勇現会社ブレイブカンパニー	Melodya メロディア	DS	
2011	Lord of Apocalypse ロード オブ アポカリプス	Yuno ユーノ	Other	
2012	Legasista	Melize	PS3	
2012	Guilty Crown: Lost Christmas	Mana Ouma	PC	
2012	The Legend of Nayuta: Boundless Trails	Noi	PSP	
2012	Danganronpa 2: Goodbye Despair	Mikan Tsumiki	PSP	
2012	Lagrange: The Flower of Rin-ne -Kamogawa Dream Match-	Muginami ムギナミ	PS3	
2012	Senran Kagura Burst	Yomi	DS	
2012	Anohana: The Flower We Saw That Day	Meiko "Menma" Honma	PSP	
2012	Tokyo Babel 東京バベル	Eve	PC (general)	
2012	Girl Friend Beta	Haruko Yumesaki		
2012	Ima Sugu Oniichan ni Imōto da tte Iitai!	Mao Shigemori	PC, also in 2014	
2013	The Pet Girl of Sakurasou	Mashiro Shiina	PS Vita, PSP	
2013	Senran Kagura Shinovi Versus	Yomi		
2013	Dungeon Travelers 2	Alicia Heart	PSP, PS Vita	
2013	Etrian Odyssey Untold: The Millennium Girl	Rosa	DS	
2013	Final Fantasy XIV: A Realm Reborn	Y'shtola	PC, Mac, PS4	
2013	Starry Sky: After Winter Portable	Takanashi Ai 高梨あい	PSP	
2014	Senran Kagura Bon Appétit!	Yomi		
2014	Golden Time: Vivid Memories	Nana Hayashida		
2014	Girls und Panzer: Senshadō, Kiwamemasu!	Saori Takebe		
2014	Hamatora: Look at Smoking World	Sally	DS	
2014	Senran Kagura 2: Deep Crimson	Yomi	DS	
2014	Lord of Magna: Maiden Heaven	Charlotte	DS	
2014	Dengeki Bunko: Fighting Climax	Mashiro Shiina	PS3	
2014	Shining Resonance	Rinna Mayfield	PS3	
2015	Tales of Zestiria	Alisha Diphda	PS3	
2015	Captain Earth: Mind Labyrinth	Hana Mutou		
2015	Senran Kagura: Estival Versus	Yomi	also Sakura edition in 2016	
2015	Saenai Heroine no Sodatekata: -blessing flowers-	Utaha Kasumigaoka		
2015	Final Fantasy XIV: Heavensward	Y'shtola	PC, Mac, PS4	
2015	Langrisser Re:Incarnation Tensei	Rona Itelime ロナ・イテリメ	DS	
2015	Tokyo Xanadu	Shiori Kurashiki	also eX+ in 2016	
2015	7th Dragon III Code: VFD	Chika, Character voice	3DS	
2015	Kantai Collection	Kashima, Asashimo, U-511/Ro-500, Katori, Katsuragi, Arashi		
2015	Food Wars!: Shokugeki no Soma	Ryōko Sakaki	DS	
2015	Exist Archive	Mayura Tsukishiro		
2015	Dengeki Bunko: Fighting Climax Ignition	Shiina Mashiro 椎名ましろ	PS3, other	
2016	Girls' Frontline	Kar98k, NTW-20, StG44	iOS, Android	
2016	Super Robot Wars Original Generation: The Moon Dwellers	Melua Mela Meia	PS3	
2016	Sword Art Online: Hollow Realization	Alice Zuberg	PS4, other	
2016	Soulworker Online	Haru Estia		
2017	New Game: The Challenge Stage	Rin Toyama		
2017	Azur Lane	Kaga, Graf Zeppelin, Atago, Renown, Zeppy, Little Renown	Android, IOS - Removed from CN client (Note: Kayano's voice was removed due to backlash on Chinese social media sites after she visited the Yasukuni Shrine.)	
2017	Final Fantasy XIV: Stormblood	Y'shtola	PC, Mac, PS4	
2017	Fire Emblem Heroes	Gunnthrá	Android, IOS	
2017	Blue Reflection	Rika Yoshimura	PlayStation	
2017	Kirara Fantasia	Leine	iOS, Android	
2018	Sword Art Online: Fatal Bullet	Alice Zuberg	PS4, Nintendo Switch	
2018	Another Eden	Feinne	iOS, Android, Nintendo Switch (TBA)	
2018	Octopath Traveler	Ophilia Clement	Nintendo Switch	
2018	Food Fantasy (2018)	Kimchi	iOS, Android	
2018	Ultra Kaiju Battle Breeders	Navi	iOS, Android	
2019	Sdorica	Sophie, Sophie SP	iOS, Android	
2019	Fate/Grand Order	Murasaki Shikibu	iOS, Android	
2019	Arknights	Platinum	Android, IOS - Removed from CN & global client	
2019	Code Vein	Mia Karnstein	PS4, Xbox One, PC	
2019	Pokémon Masters	Erika	Android	
2019	Final Fantasy XIV: Shadowbringers	Y'shtola	PC, Mac, PS4	
2019	Punishing: Gray Raven	Liv	iOS, Android - Removed from CN, TW, and global client	
2019	Touhou Cannonball	Yuyuko Saigyouji	Android, iOS	
2019	KonoSuba: God's Blessing on this Wonderful World! Fantastic Days	Darkness	iOS, Android	
2020	Granblue Fantasy	Rei, Golden Knight, Yuni	Browser, iOS, Android	
2020	World's End Club	Vanilla	iOS, Switch	
2020	Eden Door	Claris Alianna	Android, iOS	
2021	Sound Voltex Exceed Gear	Rasis	Arcade	
2021	Tsukihime -A piece of blue glass moon-	Noel	PS4, Nintendo Switch	
2021	Final Fantasy XIV: Endwalker	Y'shtola	PC, Mac, PS4, PS5	
2021	Melty Blood: Type Lumina	Noel	PC, PS4, Xbox One, Nintendo Switch	
2022	Return to Shironagasu Island	Aurora Lavilla	PC, Nintendo Switch	
2022	Xenoblade Chronicles 3	Segiri	Nintendo Switch	
2023	Sword Art Online: Last Recollection	Alice Zuberg	PC, PS4, PS5, Xbox One, Xbox Series X/S	
2024	Final Fantasy XIV: Dawntrail	Y'shtola	PC, Mac, PS4, PS5, Xbox Series X/S	

=== Drama CDs ===
List of voice performances in drama CDs
Year	Title	Role	Notes	Source
	Comical Psychosomatic Medicine	Asuna Kangoshi		

=== Dubbing ===
List of voice performances in other dubbing
Title	Role	Voice dub for	Notes	Source
The Call	Casey Welson	Abigail Breslin		
Dolittle	Mini			
Ready Player One	F'Nale Zandor	Hannah John-Kamen		
The Three Musketeers	Queen Anne	Juno Temple	2012 TV Asahi edition	

== Awards ==
Year	Award ceremony	Award	Result
2012	6th Seiyu Awards	Best Rookie Actresses	Won
