= Mayonaka Punch =

Japanese anime television series

- Key visual

真夜中ぱんチ (Mayonaka Panchi)
- Genre: Comedy
- Created by: Dōga Tōkō Shōjo
- Manga
- Written by: Dōga Tōkō Shōjo
- Illustrated by: Tomomi Usui
- Published by: Kadokawa Shoten
- Magazine: Young Ace
- Original run: March 4, 2024 – February 4, 2025
- Volumes: 2
- Anime television series
- Directed by: Shū Honma
- Written by: Hideaki Shirasaka
- Music by: tepe; raku
- Studio: P.A. Works
- Licensed by: Crunchyroll: EA/SEA: Medialink
- Original network: Tokyo MX, AT-X, BS11, KBS Kyoto, SUN, TUT
- Original run: July 8, 2024 – September 23, 2024
- Episodes: 12
- Light novel
- Written by: Tsuzuro Hibi
- Illustrated by: Tsukasa Kotobuki
- Published by: Fujimi Shobo
- Imprint: Fujimi Fantasia Bunko
- Published: July 20, 2024
- icon

Mayonaka Punch (真夜中ぱんチ, Mayonaka Panchi; lit. 'Midnight Punch') is an original Japanese anime television series produced by P.A. Works. The series is created by Dōga Tōkō Shōjo and directed by Shū Honma, with Hideaki Shirasaka serving as screenwriter, Ryōta Arima adapting Tsukasa Kotobuki's original character designs for animation, and tepe and raku composing the music. The anime aired from July to September 2024. A manga adaptation illustrated by Tomomi Usui was serialized in Kadokawa Shoten's Young Ace magazine from March 2024 to February 2025, while a light novel adaptation written by Tsuzuro Hibi and illustrated by Tsukasa Kotobuki was published by Fujimi Shobo in July 2024.

== Premise ==
Masaki Sonoue, a "NewTuber", is kicked out of her existing group due to punching one of her collaborators. Desperately seeking to rebuild her online reputation, she meets Live, the leader of a group of vampires, who is obsessed with sucking her blood. Masaki makes a deal with Live: if she helps her go viral and attract 1 million subscribers, Live can feed on her.

== Characters ==
=== Mayonaka Punch ===
Masaki Sonoue (園上 真咲, Sonoue Masaki)
Voiced by: Ikumi Hasegawa
A co-founder of the Hype-Girls NewTube channel who becomes disgraced in her field following a series of violent tendencies. As such, she works with Live in order to rebuild her broken reputation. However with fears of criticism after her scandal, she opts to stay behind the camera as the main editor and crew member of the Mayonaka Punch channel.
Live (りぶ, Ribu)
Voiced by: Fairouz Ai
A vampire and the matriarch of Banpai Manor. Having been asleep for 20 years, Live awakens after dreaming of Masaki and teams up with her to fulfil her need for blood consumption.
Ichiko (苺子)
Voiced by: Yuina Itō
A vampire and Live's attendant. A small child vampire who handles the cooking and tasks around the house.
Fū (譜風)
Voiced by: Hina Yōmiya
A vampire and Live's attendant. A shy teenage vampire who is good at singing while being a fujoshi.
Tokage (十景)
Voiced by: Hitomi Ueda
A vampire and gambling addict.
Yuki (ゆき)
Voiced by: Ai Kayano
A high-ranking vampire who watches over the residents of Banpai Manor to ensure their vampire abilities are not revealed to the public through their videos.

=== NewTuber ===
Kikka (橘花)
Voiced by: Chika Anzai
Otomi (乙美)
Voiced by: Reina Kondō
Igito (異議人)
Voiced by: Nobuhiko Okamoto
Tanbura (端ぶらー)
Voiced by: Tomokazu Sugita

=== Other characters ===
Sakura Sonoue (園上 さくら, Sonoue Sakura)
Voiced by: Manaka Iwami
Masaki's younger sister.

== Media ==
=== Manga ===
A manga adaptation illustrated by Tomomi Usui was serialized in Kadokawa Shoten's Young Ace magazine from March 4, 2024, to February 4, 2025. Two tankōbon volume were released from July 4, 2024, to March 4, 2025.

| No. | Release date | ISBN |
|---|---|---|
| 1 | July 4, 2024 | 978-4-04-115055-9 |
| 2 | March 4, 2025 | 978-4-04-115567-7 |

=== Anime ===
On January 26, 2024, Kadokawa Corporation and P.A. Works announced they were producing the original anime television series, which aired from July 8 to September 23, 2024, on Tokyo MX, AT-X and other networks. The opening theme song is "Gimmie Gimmie" (ギミギミ) performed by Live (Fairouz Ai), Ichiko (Yuina Itō), Fū (Hina Yōmiya), Tokage (Hitomi Ueda), and Yuki (Ai Kayano), while the ending theme song is "Henshū-ten" (編集点; lit. 'Edit Point') performed by Masaki (Ikumi Hasegawa). Crunchyroll is streaming the series in the Americas, Africa, Europe, Middle East, the CIS, the Indian subcontinent, and Oceania. Medialink licensed the series in East and Southeast Asia for streaming on Ani-One Asia's YouTube channel.

==== Episodes ====
| No. | Title | Directed by | Written by | Storyboarded by | Original release date |
|---|---|---|---|---|---|
| 1 | "The Canceled Girl and the Sleepy Vampire"; Transliteration: "Enjō Musume to O Nebō Vanpaia" (Japanese: 炎上娘とお寝坊ヴァンパイア) | Shū Honma | Hideaki Shirasaka | Shū Honma | July 8, 2024 |
Masaki Sonoue learns that she has been kicked off her own NewTube channel, Hype-Girls, after a series of arguments with her roommates that escalated into a physical altercation on stream. Masaki attempts to split off and do her own separate channel, but only trolls and angry former fans show up to her launch video and her audition call. Meanwhile, a vampire named Live wakes up in the Banpai Manor to find that she has been asleep for 20 years, while their blood supplies (and funds) have gotten low. As Live's attendant Ichiko shows her what has changed in 2 decades, Live sees a video thumbnail about Masaki, and believes her to be the girl from her dreams. The following night, Masaki tries to get back to her streamer roots by filming inside an abandoned hospital, where Live is searching for blood packs. Live chases Masaki through the hospital, when she ends up falling off the roof, Live saves her, and asks to suck her blood. Masaki then makes a deal with Live, that let her suck all she wants if she can get a million subscribers on a NewTube channel.
| 2 | "Starting a Channel! Good Morning from the Dead of Night!"; Transliteration: "Channeru Kaisetsu! Mayonaka Nanoni Ohhayō!" (Japanese: チャンネル開設！真夜中なのにおっはよー！) | Tatsuya Sasaki | Hideaki Shirasaka | Shū Honma | July 15, 2024 |
Masaki manages the "Chu-Chu Girls" channel consisting of Live and her attendants, Ichiko and Fu, as they perform several stunts with their vampire powers and make several short videos together, with a footnote that the actions are special effects to avoid suspicion. To Masaki's surprise, the channel eventually reaches a half-million viewers. However, another vampire named Yuki wakes up at the Manor and demands that Live and Masaki delete the channel before "Mother" finds out that they are using their vampire powers in public view. Masaki reluctantly deletes the channel and gets depressed at falling back into obscurity, but Live stops by her window and reminds her of why she wanted to make videos in the first place. Masaki comes back to the Banpai Manor with Live and the vampire girls decide to go behind Yuki's back to restart their NewTube channel under the name "Mayonaka Punch."
| 3 | "A New Member Joins! Dead or Alive"; Transliteration: "Shin Menbā Kanyū de Deddo oa Araibu" (Japanese: 新メンバー加入で DEAD or ALIVE) | Tomoaki Ohta | Seiichiro Mochizuki | Shū Honma | July 22, 2024 |
The Mayonaka Punch channel struggles to reach a fraction of the popularity of the Chu-Chu Girls due to being unable to use their vampiric powers for stunts without attracting Yuki's attention. The channel attracts the attention of another vampire and gambling addict, Tokage. After dismissing her ideas out of hand, Masaki stumbles upon Tokage's room in the Manor, which is buried in old garbage. Masaki decides to use the opportunity to show Mayonaka Punch cleaning out the garbage. Tokage is fine at first, but after hearing that they won't make much money from the video, gets into a fight with Live that escalates outside the manor. Yuki then appears and destroys both SD cards containing the footage, promising to not tell Mother if they each eat a plate full of peeled garlic cloves. Tokage gets Masaki to turn their punishment into a video. The garlic makes the vampires go crazy, but the video later gets 12,000 views. A few days later, Masaki decides to move into the manor, while Tokage is angry at hearing that the channel isn't monetized yet.
| 4 | "The Star of the Next Video is Who?"; Transliteration: "Tsugi no Kikaku no Shuyaku Fū?" (Japanese: 次の企画の主役はwho?) | Aya Kobayashi | Yumi Suzumori | Kotomi Deai | July 29, 2024 |
Several years ago, Fu formed a musical duo with a girl named Aya. However, Fu ran away from their audition, as she didn't want to expose herself as a vampire. In the present, Masaki stumbles across Fu's old musical tapes, and tries to convince Fu to do a cover song for the NewTube channel, but Fu refuses. Masaki and the other girls pore through various sources to try to find what happened to Aya, and track her down to a club in New York City. When Masaki leaves the address behind on the piano, Fu goes to NYC herself. She later returns to Banpai Manor, after speaking to the club owner, who reveals that Aya passed away and left behind her own guitar. The man lets Fu take the case with the guitar, and in the case is a video disc where Aya recorded her last message. Fu cries about her regrets not being able to go pro with her, and later performs a cover song for the Mayonaka Punch channel.
| 5 | "Blood-or-Die! Desert Island Survival"; Transliteration: "Chi Shi! Mujintō Sabaibaru" (Japanese: 血死！無人島サバイバル) | Yuri Hagiwara | Seiichiro Mochizuki | Junichi Sakata | August 5, 2024 |
With Masaki feeling stressed out from trying to grow the channel, she challenges Live to direct the other girls as a group by spending a week on a desert island and filming it as a survival challenge. Though Live manages to convince Ichiko, Fu, and Tokage to go along, she struggles with keeping the group on task and stopping them from using their vampire powers on camera. Unfortunately, bigger problems arise when Tokage discovers the group forgot to take blood packs with them, and a typhoon suddenly passes by the island, trapping them there while Masaki is none the wiser. As the group begins transforming into bat forms from lack of blood, Live has a dream of Masaki again, before she wakes up to find the actual Masaki feeding her a blood pack, having convinced Yuki to take both her and the blood supplies to the island once the typhoon passed.
| 6 | "Ichiko's Wish"; Transliteration: "Ichiko no Negai" (Japanese: 苺子の願い) | Aya Kobayashi | Yumi Suzumori | Katsumi Terahigashi | August 12, 2024 |
After Tokage destroys a large section of the Banpai Manor during drunken antics and gains some media attention, Mother (through Yuki) calls for the Banpai Manor to be demolished and for its residents to be moved into a different home before humanity discovers the existence of vampires. However, Ichiko wants to stay in the manor, telling Masaki about her past. After Masaki takes drastic measures to get the girls to eat dinner together, Ichiko proposes a special show to convince Mother to not demolish the manor. The other vampire girls play a concert on a stream in front of Mother to show how they've grown over the years, but Yuki is unmoved. However, after the Banpai Manor residents tearfully plead for mercy, Mother gives them six months to gain a million viewers before she officially orders the Manor's demolition.
| 7 | "Your Faves Are Adorbs, Hit That Subscribe"; Transliteration: "Oshi wa Tōtoshi Oseyo Tōroku" (Japanese: 推しは尊し押せよ登録) | Takeyuki Sadohara | Hideaki Shirasaka | Takeshi Furuta | August 19, 2024 |
The channel continues to have trouble attracting new subscribers, despite Masaki taking efforts to increase the output of videos, overworking herself to edit them all. After the vampires attempt to edit the videos while Masaki is incapacitated, resulting in an argument, Fu helps her realise the importance of establishing an authentic connection with viewers to build an audience. Masaki realises that she had been editing away the "best parts", by removing segments that show the girls' personalities to pursue a more polished product.
| 8 | "Starring in TSUMA FES Extreme!"; Transliteration: "Sansen! Tsuma Fesu・Kiwami" (Japanese: 参戦！TSUMA FES・極) | Tomoaki Ohta | Seiichiro Mochizuki | Naokatsu Tsuda | August 26, 2024 |
The girls head to a NewTuber collaboration event. Initially Mayopan's efforts fail, as each of the girls perform poorly in their challenges: having stagefright, being too lazy to take part in a game event, misreading instructions, or getting drunk. For their final event, an idol performance, the power fails. Masaki identifies and fights with the culprit as the other vampires do a successful performance in the dark.
| 9 | "Welcome. This Is Your Family Home Now!"; Transliteration: "Okaeri. Koko ga Ima Kara Anta no Jikka da!" (Japanese: お帰り。ここが今からあんたの実家だ！) | Masanori Miyata | Yumi Suzumori | Yoshiyuki Asai | September 2, 2024 |
During the winter break, Masaki returns to her family home to look after her little sister. The vampires soon follow after, and Masaki devises a video idea where each of the vampires would pretend that Masaki's sister is her own. Gradually this reveals the difficult relationship between the two, until Masaki and her sister reconcile.
| 10 | "Rampage × Fateful Showdown!"; Transliteration: "Bōsō × Innen no Taiketsu!" (Japanese: 暴走 × 因縁の対決！) | Shun Tsuchida | Yumi Suzumori | Goichi Iwahata | September 9, 2024 |
Intent on having Masaki appear on camera once again, Ichiko makes a video hinting at a new member. This leads Yuki is believe she is being invited to join Mayonaka Punch. Meanwhile, Masaki meets up with her former NewTuber partners, deciding to start appearing in videos again. However, before that, her identity and past exploits are revealed online, leading to many negative comments.
| 11 | "Announcement: Gone Missing"; Transliteration: "[Gohōkoku] Shissō Shimashita" (Japanese: 「ご報告」失踪しました) | Megumi Soga | Hideaki Shirasaka | Katsumi Terahigashi | September 16, 2024 |
One month is left before the deadline to get a million subscribers. Hounded by negative comments, Masaki leaves the house, insulting Live in the process. While enjoying a break from NewTube work, Masaki finds out what Live has disappeared and the rest of Mayonaka Punch have stopped posting videos. Returning, she finds Banpai Manor being prepared for demolition and herself being shadowed by mysterious figures. She is rescued by the remaining members of the channel, who tell her that the deadline has been moved up, and they are planning one last livestream to save the Manor, and convince Live to return. The group hole up in the hospital where Live and Masaki met while hunters sent by the Mother vampire surround them.
| 12 | "The Last Live Stream" | Shū Honma | Hideaki Shirasaka | Shū Honma | September 23, 2024 |
The remaining members of Mayonaka Punch are taken out one by one until Masaki is all that remains. Masaki makes an emotional appeal to Live while trying to evade capture. Cornered on the roof of the hospital, she acknowledges that despite the negative attention she has gotten, she has supporters as well, and affirms that she makes videos because she enjoys it. Trying to leap to another roof, she falls, and is saved by Live once again. Then she realises that Live had been in disguise as a hunter all along. Indeed, the whole thing is revealed as a prank played on her. Live explains that Masaki saved her life twenty years ago as a young child, saying they are destined to be together. Masaki punches Live in the face. Although Masaki voids the deal she made with Live afterwards at first, she reverses the annulment to Live and they resume their goal for Mayonaka Punch to get a million subscribers.

=== Light novel ===
A light novel adaptation written by Tsuzuro Hibi and illustrated by Tsukasa Kotobuki was published by Fujimi Shobo under their Fujimi Fantasia Bunko imprint on July 20, 2024.

== See also ==
- Ya Boy Kongming! – another anime series directed by Shū Honma
