= Super Seisyun Brothers =

Japanese manga and anime series

- Cover of the first volume

SSB ―超青春姉弟s― (SSB ―Sūpā Seishun Burazāzu―)
- Genre: Comedy, slice of life
- Manga
- Written by: Shin Shinmoto
- Published by: G-Mode
- Magazine: Comic Polaris
- Original run: November 2012 – October 2018
- Volumes: 11
- Anime television series
- Directed by: Masahiro Takata
- Written by: Tomoko Konparu
- Music by: Yoshihiro Ike
- Studio: AIC PLUS+
- Original network: TV Tokyo, AT-X
- Original run: September 13, 2013 – December 13, 2013
- Episodes: 14

Super Seisyun Brothers (Japanese: SSB ―超青春姉弟s―, Hepburn: SSB ―Sūpā Seishun Burazāzu―) is a Japanese slice of life comedy manga series written and illustrated by Shin Shinmoto. An anime television series adaptation aired on TV Tokyo between September and December 2013.

== Plot ==
The manga follows the daily lives of two sets of twin sisters and their younger brothers.

== Characters ==
Chiko Shinmoto (新本 チコ, Shinmoto Chiko)
Voiced by: Nozomi Yamamoto
Chiko is the elder sister of the Shinmoto siblings and is a 2nd-year college student. She has a blonde hair and blue eyes and is fond of handsome guys. In the first episode of the anime, she doesn't seem to like college because there aren't any handsome guys. Chiko is called an otaku but Chiko seems to hate being called that. Instead, she wants to be called a bishōjo.
Chika Shinmoto (新本 チカ, Shinmoto Chika)
Voiced by: Ryōta Ōsaka
Chika is the younger brother of the Shinmoto siblings and is a 2nd year high school student. He has blonde hair and blue eyes like his sister. He is popular with the girls in his school which is annoying to his sister.

The Saitō siblings are as weird and quiet as their calm faces. They often visit the Shinmoto siblings when they are bored. Both of the siblings are popular wherever they go.

Mako Saitō (斉藤 マコ, Saitō Mako)
Voiced by: Ai Kayano
Mako is the elder sister of the Saitō siblings and a part-time worker outside. Her education status is unknown. She is seen practicing an alien language with her hand puppet in the first episode of the anime. She is an idol otaku.
Mao Saitō (斉藤 マオ, Saitō Mao)
Voiced by: Kaito Ishikawa
Mao is the younger brother of the Saitō siblings and a 2nd year high school student, just like Chika. He resembles his sister and is also seen with his hand puppet in the first episode of the anime. Mao seems to have a crush on Chiko.

== Media ==
=== Manga ===
The manga is written and illustrated by Shin Shinmoto and has been serialized in the G-Mode's web magazine Comic Polaris since November 2012. The series has been collected in eleven tankōbon volumes, released in Japan between November 22, 2012, and October 11, 2018. On April 20, 2017, a spin-off was announced "Super Seisyun Brothers PLUS", changing to big brothers and little sisters, as it was serialized it has been renamed to "Suki desu, Tonari no Onii-chan".

=== Anime ===
An anime television series adaptation, produced by AIC Plus+, aired in Japan on TV Tokyo between September 13 and December 13, 2013. The series is directed by Masahiro Takata with composition by Tomoko Konparu, and character design by Noriko Morishima. The series' ending theme song is "Watashi ni Naritai Watashi" (私になりたい私, lit. The Me I want To Be) by Rokugen Alice.

No.	Title	Original release date
1	"Bro and Sis + Bro and Sis =" "Shitei + Shitei =" ({{{1}}})	September 13, 2013
2	"Already an Adult, Yet Still a Child" "Mō Otona, Mada Kodomo" (もう大人、まだ子供)	September 20, 2013
3	"Opposite Sex, Same Sex" "Isei Dōsei" (いせいどうせい)	September 27, 2013
4	"20 Year Olds' Daily Lives" "20-sai no Nichijō" (20歳の日常)	October 4, 2013
5	"17 Year Olds' Daily Lives" "17-sai no Nichijō" (17歳の日常)	October 11, 2013
6	"One Step Forward" "Ippo Susumu" (一歩進む)	October 18, 2013
7	"Now and Then" "Ima Mukashi" (いまむかし)	October 25, 2013
8	"Festival ~Dreams and Fantasies Arc~" "Matsuri ~Yume to Mōsō Hen~" (まつり～夢と妄想編～)	November 1, 2013
9	"Festival ~Reality Arc~" "Matsuri ~Genjitsu Hen~" (まつり～現実編～)	November 8, 2013
10	"Little Brothers' Circumstances" "Otōto no Jijō" (弟の事情)	November 15, 2013
11	"Big Sisters' Circumstances" "Ane no Jijō" (姉の事情)	November 22, 2013
12	"Everybody's Circumstances" "Sorezore no Jijō" (それぞれの事情)	November 29, 2013
13	"Super Youth Siblings" "Chō Seishun Kyōdai s" (超青春姉弟s)	December 6, 2013
14	"My Angel Sometime Devil" "Tenshi Tokidoki Akuma" (天使時々悪魔)	December 13, 2013
