= List of Ushio & Tora characters =

A selection of characters from the series, including (From the bottom left to the top right) Omamori, Mayuko Inoue, Raishin, Kagari, Tora, Asako Nakamura, Hyou, Shigure and Ushio Aotsuki

The manga series Ushio & Tora features an extensive cast of characters created by Kazuhiro Fujita.

== Main characters ==
Ushio Aotsuki (蒼月 潮, Aotsuki Ushio)
Voiced by: Nozomu Sasaki (OVA), Tasuku Hatanaka (TV series), Kazumi Togashi (young, anime) (Japanese); Randy Sparks (OVA), David Matranga (OVA and TV series) (English)
Ushio, the half-divine son of a temple priest, is fated to wield the Beast Spear against the monstrous Hakumen no Mono. His compassionate nature and bond with the yōkai Tora unite humans and yōkai against their common foe. Protective of his friends Asako and Mayuko, he frequently defends them from supernatural threats. He discovers the spear's curse—it drains his life force to fuel its power. When the weapon briefly overcomes him, a transformative journey to Kamuikotan reveals his destiny. He narrowly avoids becoming an Azafuse—former Beast Spear-wielding tiger-like yōkai—when ancestral spirits intervene, tasking him with continuing their legacy as a human.
Tora (とら)
Voiced by: Chikao Ohtsuka (OVA), Rikiya Koyama (TV series) (Japanese); Brett Weaver (OVA and TV series) (English)
Tora is an ancient, tiger-like yōkai resembling a raijū, freed when Ushio removed the Beast Spear. Once feared as Nagatobimaru for his immense strength and lightning powers, he was sealed in the temple basement for 500 years. Though he claims he will eat Ushio and Mayuko—whose hamburgers he enjoys—he refuses to attack them dishonorably and grows fond of their company, admitting he is never bored around Ushio. Originally human, Tora was once Shagakusha, a host for Hakumen no Mono since infancy. This connection masks the Beast Spear's presence, preventing Hakumen's minions from locating the temple during his imprisonment. Unlike other Azafuse, Tora retains traces of his humanity, reflecting his tragic past as a fallen Beast Spear wielder.

== Supporting characters ==
Asako Nakamura (中村 麻子, Nakamura Asako)
Voiced by: Yuri Amano (OVA), Mikako Komatsu (TV series) (Japanese); Jessica Calvello (OVA (first dub)), Allison Sumrall (OVA (second dub) and TV series) (English)
The hot-headed, tomboyish childhood friend of Ushio and Mayuko. She and Ushio love each other the most, and she also cares for Mayuko a lot. Her family owns a ramen restaurant.
Mayuko Inoue (井上 真由子, Inoue Mayuko)
Voiced by: Yumi Tōma (OVA), Kiyono Yasuno (TV series) (Japanese); Carol Matthews (OVA (first dub)), Mandy Clark (OVA (second dub)), Luci Christian (TV series) (English)
Ushio and Asako's best friend. She is more sweet and feminine. She cares for Ushio and has feelings for him but understands he and Asako love each other and helps the two be together. She also has feelings for Tora, whom she readily buys hamburgers for. Later, she took in Kirio as her stepbrother. It is also revealed that she belongs to the lineage of powerful lady shamans. Therefore, Mayuko is able to create psychic barriers powerful enough to hold back Hakumen.
Shigure Aotsuki (蒼月 紫暮, Aotsuki Shigure)
Voiced by: Takeshi Aono (OVA), Keiji Fujiwara (TV series) (Japanese); Rob Mungle (OVA (first dub)), John Swasey (OVA (second dub) and TV series) (English)
Ushio's father, keeper of the temple he and his son live in. He is a stern, businesslike man at times, but also kind and wise. His secret identity is being one of strongest priest of a special Buddhist sect named Kouhamei, dedicated to fighting yōkai.
Reiko Hanyuu (羽生 礼子, Hanyū Reiko)
Voiced by: Yui Makino (Japanese); Kira Vincent-Davis (English)
An orphaned girl who goes to the same school as Ushio, Asako and Mayuko. Her father was very overprotective of her, and when he died he became an oni, causing danger to any boys who took the slightest fancy of her. This distressed her greatly, and she tried to commit suicide many times in vain. Ushio finally made her father realize his errors, and he left for the afterworld. Thereafter, Reiko was able to lead a normal life, and became good friends with Ushio, Asako and Mayuko.
Hyou (鏢, Hyō)
Voiced by: Norio Wakamoto (OVA), Daisuke Namikawa (TV series) (Japanese); Ed Paez (OVA), David Wald (TV series) (English)
A powerful Chinese exorcist, highly skilled in geomancy, usage of seals and flying spears. He travels around China and eventually comes to Japan to seek the yōkai who killed his wife and his daughter, and took out his right eye and left three long scars on his face. In his right eye socket now is a magical blue crystal ball used to save his life by his teacher. Hyou initially thinks Tora is the one who murdered his family, but Ushio convinces him Tora is innocent, and Hyou later calms down a little, becoming a valued ally. He died after finally killing Guren, the murderer of his family, while defending a mother and her child.
Jie Mei (ジエメイ（決眉）, Jie Mei)
Voiced by: Kana Hanazawa (Japanese); Carli Mosier (English)
The spirit guardian who lives in the darkness of the Beast Spear. She is the sister of Giryō, who sacrificed her life to create the blade of the spear. She reincarnated as Yuki, the first of the lineage of powerful lady shamans, all but one has the same look as her. Jie Mei is able freely materialize anywhere needed, and first appeared to help prevent Ushio from transforming into a Beast by having his soul totally absorbed by the spear.
Giryō (ギリョウ)
Voiced by: Mamoru Miyano (Japanese); John Gremillion (English)
The brother of Jie Mei, a highly skilled blacksmith who eventually goes insane from being unable to prevent her sacrifice. Filled with anger, remorse and regret, he hammered his body into the shaft of the spear. His spirit is trapped in the darkness of the spear, unlike his sister, and can greatly influence the user of the spear with his fury. Still, he has pledged his loyalty to Ushio. He served as the Beast Spear's shaft.
Yū Hiyama (檜山 勇, Hiyama Yū)
Voiced by: Aki Toyosaki (Japanese); Brittney Karbowski (English)
A young girl whose father was killed in an airplane crash caused by Fusuma, a flying demon. Initially she blamed her father's long-time friend Atsuzawa for the incident, but after helping Ushio to defeat Fusuma, she learns the truth and forgives Atsuzawa. Her father is revived and aided in the final battle against Hakumen no Mono.
Saya Takatori (鷹取 小夜, Takatori Saya)
Voiced by: Yūka Nanri (Japanese); Tiffany Grant (English)
Saya Takatori, a shy descendant of white-haired guardians, maintains her family's prosperity by tending to the spirit Omamori. When Ushio prepares to destroy Omamori's barrier, she initially resists due to the lethal backlash but relents when Tora intervenes. This act begins her transformation—gaining confidence as her hair turns brown, symbolizing her freedom from the ancestral duty. Inheriting her mother's power, she opens the Gates of Hell to revive allies during the final battle against Hakumen no Mono, with Omamori ultimately closing them.
Shinji Tokuno (徳野 信二, Tokuno Shinji)
A former yakuza who left the business when he was diagnosed with cancer, and unconsciously decided to return to his home village. He was a delinquent as a child and was picked on and looked down by the others in his village, leading to his distaste for others. He sacrifices himself to seal Shimuna, the mist spirit and keep it from destroying his village. In the chapters afterward, Ushio wears Shinji's overcoat in memory of his sacrifice.
Kenichi Masaki (間崎賢一, Masaki Ken'ichi)
Voiced by: Yuichi Nakamura (Japanese); David Wald (English)
Reiko's classmate and childhood friend. They became estranged after the death of Reiko's father, but made up with her after he and Ushio defeat the Oni that once was Reiko's father.
Kyōji Atsuzawa (厚沢 恭治, Atsuzawa Kyōji)
Voiced by: Masaki Terasoma (Japanese); Mark Laskowski (English)
A pilot and friend of Yū Hiyama's father. He saw Fusuma kill his friend and when Ushio and Tora killed the sky demon, Yū apologized to him for blaming him for her father's death.
Sumako Aotsuki (蒼月 須磨子, Aotsuki Sumako)
Voiced by: Maaya Sakamoto (Japanese); Emily Neves (English)
Sumako is Ushio's mother, long presumed dead until a yōkai reveals her survival and the hatred yōkai bear toward her. As the third in a lineage of shamans, she maintains the 800-year seal imprisoning Hakumen no Mono beneath the ocean to protect Japan. Granted a two-year reprieve by Jie Mei, she meets Shigure and conceives Ushio before returning to her post.

== The Kōhamei Sect ==
Mikado Hizaki (日崎 御角, Hizaki Mikado)
Voiced by: Wakana Yamazaki (OVA), Fumiko Orikasa (TV series) (Japanese); Mandy Clark (OVA) (English)
A petite old woman who commands the respect of the entire sect, being the Second Oyakume who maintains Hakumen no Mono's barrier prison. She was the shaman who sealed the Gamin in the boxes a long time ago. She has sacrificed herself by using all her psychic powers to kill one of the avatars of Hakumen no Mono that attacked the Kōhamei Sect headquarters. She is revived and participates in the final battle against Hakumen no Mono.
Nigira (和羅)
Voiced by: Hidekatsu Shibata (Japanese); Marty Fleck (English)
The leader of the Kōhamei sect, and the younger brother of Kyōra, nearly identical to him except for a large scar across the right side of his face. Initially Nigira is against entrusting Ushio with the Beast Spear, but is finally convinced by Oyakume to observe Ushio in order to test his worth.
Kyōra (凶羅)
Kyōra, older brother of Nigira, was excommunicated from his sect for abandoning Buddhist teachings to pursue yōkai extermination, though the sect still employs him for difficult tasks. After failing to defeat Ushio and Tora at Aomori Castle—where Ushio merged with the Beast Spear—Kyōra vows revenge, even stealing a sacred temple weapon. Despite his hostility toward sect members, he demonstrates loyalty to Mikado Hizaki by self-mutilation in a failed rescue attempt. Following the battle, he is seen atop defeated Azafuse forces, complaining about others burdening him with their responsibilities.
Hinowa Sekimori (関守 日輪, Sekimori Hinowa)
Voiced by: Nana Mizuki (Japanese); Stephanie Wittels (English)
Hinowa is a formidable and sharp-tongued warrior who opposes Ushio's status as a Chosen of the Beast Spear, considering him undisciplined compared to the rigorously trained Kouhamei sect candidates. When the Spear rejects her and returns to Ushio, she reluctantly assists him despite her misgivings. Skilled in barrier magic through her combs, she plays a key role in Kamuikotan by helping restrain Ushio during his Beast Spear-induced rampage and restoring his humanity.
Nagare Akiba (秋葉 流, Akiba Nagare)
Voiced by: Yoshimasa Hosoya (Japanese); Ian Sinclair (English)
Nagare, one of the four Chosen, demonstrates mastery of holy weapons including the shakuja. His composed demeanor masks a nihilistic pursuit of challenge, culminating in alliance with Hakumen no Mono against Ushio. When defeated by Tora in combat, he dies contentedly while Tora laments human fragility—an encounter that fractures Tora and Ushio's friendship. Nagare later returns as a spirit aiding Ushio's final confrontation with Hakumen no Mono.
Satoru Moritsuna (杜綱 悟, Moritsuna Satoru)
Voiced by: Ryōta Ōsaka (Japanese); Clifford Chapin (English)
A master shikigami user and the most senior of the four Chosen of the Beast Spear. He was possessed by Hiyō to attack Ushio and destroy the Beast Spear. He is very protective of his younger sister Jun.
Jun Moritsuna (杜綱 純, Moritsuna Jun)
Voiced by: Ayahi Takagaki (Japanese); Emily Neves (English)
Jun, Satoru's younger sister, possesses significant spiritual energy despite failing to become a Beast Spear Chosen. She demonstrates this power during critical moments.
Kirio (キリオ)
Voiced by: Megumi Han (Japanese); Blake Shepard (English)
Kirio, the youngest and strongest of the four Chosen, wields the Elzaar Scythe alongside his artificial companion Kuin. Created by Inasa and Towako from a human child to serve as an alternative Beast Spear wielder, he infiltrates the Kouhamei Sect headquarters but is defeated by Ushio. Witnessing Towako's rampage and Mikado Hizaki's death prompts his redemption. After time traveling, he reveals Tora's history as the first Beast Spear wielder and Hakumen no Mono's human host to Mayuko. He later joins the Inoue family as her adopted brother.

== HAMMR (Head Anti Metamorphose Measure Research) ==
Nicholas Koestler (ニコラス・ケストラー, Nikorasu Kesutorā)
Voiced by: Ikuya Sawaki (Japanese); Jay Hickman (English)
A specialist in medical electronics and genetic research. He initially opposes Ushio over unethical research methods before reconciling. His experimental barrier technology protects him from Hiyō's memory alteration, making him one of few humans who retain knowledge of Ushio. He later provides Ushio with the Stone-Eating Armor. A former boxer, Koestler challenges Ushio after the final battle but disappears during the Black Horde's assault on HAMMER headquarters along with Marco.
Marco Pavroti (マルコ・パブロティ, Maruko Paburoti)
Voiced by: Kinryū Arimoto (Japanese); Rob Mungle (English)
Marco, a HAMMR researcher, authors a pivotal letter to Ushio detailing the Beast Spear's dual nature: it harms both yōkai and its wielder by consuming their finite soul energy. The letter reveals Ushio's nearly depleted life force, confirming his impending death in the coming battle against Hakumen no Mono. Asako discovers this letter at temple ruins and, despite Hiyō's memory alteration, contacts HAMMR and mobilizes friends to intercept Ushio. Their intervention fails when Ushio acknowledges he long understood this would be a one-way journey.
Helena Markov (ヘレナ・マーコフ, Herena Mākofu)
Voiced by: Yuko Tsuga (Japanese); Tiffany Grant (English)
Helena serves as HAMMR's lead scientist, commanding respect among her colleagues. During the organization's study of Ushio, Tora, and the Beast Spear, a fragment of Hakumen no Mono awakens and consumes numerous captive yōkai. Despite sustaining mortal injuries, Helena remains to collect critical data until the facility's destruction. She shares with Asako the story of her deceased son Paul before dying with satisfaction, having successfully transmitted her research findings.

== Supernatural beings ==
=== Hostile ===
Stone Eater (石喰い, Ishikui)
Voiced by: Hiroki Yasumoto (Japanese); John Swasey (English)
A 200-year-old centipede demon that turns its victims into stone before devouring them; it does this slowly in order to relish the fear of its victims. Inhabited a stone statue of a samurai until it was defeated by Ushio. Its broken pieces were later collected and made into a supernatural armour for Ushio.
Oni (鬼)
Voiced by: Kenta Miyake (Japanese); Rob Mungle (English)
Formerly the master artist Michio Hanyuu. When his wife ran off with one of his students he became filled with hate and became an oni after he died. His soul inhabited a painting he had made of his daughter Reiko and was fiercely jealous of anyone who tried to get close to her, resulting in 'accidents' happening to all those who did. He finally passed on after Ushio defeated him by stabbing the painting he inhabited with the Beast Spear. He is revived and fights during the final conflict with Hakumen no Mono.
Gamin (餓眠)
Voiced by: Fumihiko Tachiki (father), Hiroshi Naka (grandfather), Shōko Tsuda (mother), Yū Shimamura (sister), Takahiro Fujiwara (brother) (Japanese); Andrew Love (father), Kyle Colby Jones (grandfather), Shelley Calene-Black (mother), Patricia Duran (sister), Courtland Johnson (brother) (English)
A group of five demonic heads that were sealed in boxes that were pinned beneath a massive stone by the priestess Mikado Hizaki. After they were unwittingly released by a construction team they slaughtered the workers and searched the city for Hizaki in order to exact their revenge even though Hizaki was long dead. They pursued Mayuko because her appearance was identical to Hizaki's, but they were confronted and defeated by Tora (because he wanted to eat Mayuko himself at the time).
Ayakashi (あやかし)
An avatar of Hakumen no mono who takes on the form of a giant long purple whale like sea serpent.
Fusuma (衾)
Voiced by: Wataru Takagi (Japanese); Andrew Love (English)
A sky-going demon that eats humans, he caused an air carrier to crash and devoured all 200 occupants including Yū's father. He attacked the plane that Ushio, Tora, Yū and Atsuzawa were on and killed the pilots in order to control the plane. However he was wounded in the neck by the Beast Spear and was completely destroyed by an exploding missile from an air support fighter plane (according to Tora his weaknesses are the tooth of an ohaguro and large amounts of fire). Before dying he remarks that it was not a bad thing to die before Hakumen no Mono's awakening.
Shumuna (シュムナ)
An invincible demon composed of only corrosive mist that dissolves and digests humans, yōkai and any organic matter.He is also one of Hakumen no mono's avatars'.
Guren (紅煉)
Voiced by: Norio Wakamoto (Japanese); Andrew Love (English)
A black Azafuse with a sadistic heart who has pledged to assist Hakumen no Mono in exchange for being released from his stone hibernation and given three obake-killing blades. Once a human mercenary who loved killing more than anything, one day he found the Beast Spear and used it to slay yōkai until he turned into an Azafuse, murdering and devouring families whenever he pleased. Hyou's family was murdered by him and after a very long fight, he was slain by Hyou, avenging his family at the cost of his own life.

=== Allied ===
Umizatō (海座頭)
Voiced by: Minoru Inaba (Japanese); Philip Hays (English)
An old acquaintance of Tora back when he was called Nagatobimaru. A guardian of the ocean he takes the form of an elderly man with a walking stick and a sake jug. He enlists the help of Ushio and Tora in order to subdue a giant sea serpent. Later he inadvertently reveals to Ushio that his mother (whom he thought dead) is still alive and hated by all yōkai.
The Kamaitachi Siblings

Raishin (雷信, Kaminarishin)
Voiced by: Show Hayami (OVA), Shin-ichiro Miki (TV series) (Japanese); Andy McAvin (OVA), Jay Hickman (TV series) (English)
Juurou (十郎, Jūrō)
Voiced by: Kazuki Yao (OVA), Yuki Kaji (TV series) (Japanese); Illich Guardiola (OVA), John Gremillion (TV series) (English)
Kagari (かがり, Kagari)
Voiced by: Hiromi Tsuru (OVA), Risa Shimizu (TV series) (Japanese); Monica Rial (OVA), Patricia Duran (TV series) (English)

The kamaitachi siblings Raishin, Juurou, and Kagari inhabit the Tono region after being displaced by human development. While Raishin and Kagari seek Ushio's help to stop Juurou's human-killing rampage, Ushio empathizes with their plight, moved to tears by the yōkai's suffering. During the confrontation, Juurou is momentarily swayed by Ushio's compassion and helps rescue his trapped siblings. When Juurou later attacks in despair, Ushio kills him reflexively, granting the tormented yōkai peace. Raishin and Kagari subsequently become Ushio's allies, and Juurou briefly returns during the final battle against Hakumen no Mono.
Omamori (オマモリ様, Omamori-sama)
Voiced by: Ai Kayano (Japanese); Brittney Karbowski (English)
A zashiki warashi spirit imprisoned by the Takatori family in order to ensure the family's prosperity. During her imprisonment Omamori has been comforted by a long line of white-haired women including Saya's mother. She foretold the coming of a boy with a spear who would free her from her imprisonment, this was fulfilled when Ushio came to the Takatori house and destroyed the barrier imprisoning her. Even after the destruction of the Takatori household she remains behind to watch over Saya. She sides with Ushio during the attack of the Tono and spoke to Osa on his behalf.
Ungaikyō no Onji (雲外鏡のおんじ)
Voiced by: Shōzō Iizuka (Japanese); Rob Mungle (English)
An ancient mirror yōkai acquainted with the kamaitachi, who reluctantly aids Ushio in rescuing Asako and Mayuko from a Fiendish Mirror.
Kappa (河童)
Voiced by: Yūji Ueda (Japanese); Kyle Colby Jones (English)
A friendly Kappa that heals Ushio when he was injured by the Tono yōkai. He also tells him the song about Hakumen no Mono and why all yōkai fear and hate it.
Hitotsuki (一鬼)
Voiced by: Hisao Egawa (Japanese); John Gremillion (English)
A yōkai who allies with Tora against Hakumen no Mono. After initially refusing to cease his attacks on Ushio, Tora forcibly subdues him into compliance.
Yamanmoto (山ン本)
Voiced by: Toshio Furukawa
The wise chief of the Tono yōkai whose true self is that of a powerful Tengu. He is revealed to be also the chief of the Kanto yōkai.
Izuna (イズナ)
Voiced by: Nao Nagasawa (Japanese); Jay Hickman (English)
A small fox-like spirit sent by the Osa of Tono to assist Ushio in his effort to purge the demons possessing Moritsuna.
Tokisaka (時逆) and Tokijun (時順)
Voiced by: Mayumi Tanaka (Japanese); Brittney Karbowski (English)
The time travelling yōkai who send Ushio and Tora back to the past to observe the birth of the Beast Spear.
Kuin (九印)
Voiced by: Katsuyuki Konishi (Japanese); David Wald (English)
An artificial yōkai created by Inasa to aid Kirio against Hakumen no Mono. He maintains calm composure in all situations unless provoked, and shares a longstanding rivalry with Tora.
Shinno (神野)
Voiced by: Junichi Suwabe (Japanese); Chris Patton (English)
The chief of the Kansai yōkai, who believed that his army could defeat the imprisoned Hakumen no Mono. He wields a huge claymore like a katana called Rubashiri.
Bal (バル, Baldeners; バルデナーズ)
A blue Muscular humanoid yokai who takes the form of a human boy and one of the Monsters from HAMMR until Asako saved him after The lab exploded, he later returned with other baldeners' fighting off the Black horde saving Asako.
Satori (さとり)
Satori is a mind-reading yōkai who protects Minoru, a blind boy, after a plane crash in his mountain territory. Upon learning about eye transplantation, he begins killing humans to procure eyes for the child. Ushio discovers these murders but the Beast Spear does not react to Satori due to his lack of hostile intent. When a nurse unexpectedly appears and provokes Satori's aggressive instincts, the spear automatically strikes and kills him. This death profoundly affects Ushio, who must tell Minoru his first lie about Satori's disappearance. Satori's spirit later returns to assist Ushio in the final battle against Hakumen no Mono.

=== Hakumen no Mono ===
Hakumen no Mono (白面の者)
Voiced by: Megumi Hayashibara (Japanese); John Swasey (English)
Hakumen no Mono is an ancient white nine-tailed fox of immense power who delights in manipulating rulers to sow chaos. Currently imprisoned beneath the sea south of Japan by a shaman bloodline's psychic barrier, he schemes to destroy the Beast Spear before escaping. Each of his nine tails possesses unique abilities, generating minion yōkai and powerful avatars capable of penetrating the barrier to fulfill his will. These avatars rank among the strongest foes encountered in the series.
Hiyō (婢妖)
Small yōkai minions spawned from Hakumen that looks like a flying eyeball with ears. They can combine together to form a stronger entity or attack en masse in huge numbers. They are also capable of eating specific memories in humans and bakemono alike.
Kuragi (くらぎ)
Voiced by: Yūko Kaida (Japanese); Kira Vincent-Davis (English)
A giant cricket-like monster that easily broke through the protective barrier of the Kouhamei Sect Main Headquarters. Possesses razor sharp claws and body that can reflect standard attacks.
Towako (斗和子)
An avatar in the form of an enigmatic lady who suddenly appeared to assist the renegade Kouhamei monk, Inasa, in his research to create the Elzaar Scythe. After Inasa died, Towako acted as Kirio's mom and through the boy, manipulated a group of Kouohamei Sect monks to abduct the Beast Spear. She did manage to partially destroy the Beast Spear but it was revived by Ushio's pledge.
Black Horde (黒炎, Kokuen)
Powerful clones created using Guren as the base. Therefore, resembling black Azafuses.
