= List of Jewelpet Happiness characters =

This is the list of characters appearing in the anime Jewelpet Happiness.

== Main characters ==
Chiari Tsukikage (月影ちあり, Tsukikage Chiari)
Voiced by: Megumi Han

Chiari is the main protagonist of the series and a Third Year Junior High School student who attends class in the prestigious Jewel Academy. Always a positive thinker and a straightforward yet bright girl, she also has a serious case of bad luck, which sometimes becomes good when in certain conditions. She first met Ruby at the Jewel Academy when she is opening the Jewelpet Cafe just near the academy and her luck became better, also helping her out on managing it. Ruruka and Nene were her best friends in class and also her roommates. Chiari is also a cheerleader for the Academy itself and slowly develops a crush to Sanada.

Nene Konoe (近衛ねね, Konoe Nene)
Voiced by: Ikumi Hayama

Nene is one of Chari's roommate and classmate in the Jewel Academy. Also in the Third Grade Junior High, she is the daughter of the Department Store King and also having a posh and yet stern personality. She take over a leadership role when things get out of hand for Chiari and her friends and also tries to manage some of her father's businesses despite being a student. Nene is also shown to be a good cook and has a crush on Mouri.

Ruruka Hanayama (華山るるか, Hanayama Ruruka)
Voiced by: Mai Aizawa

Also a close friend of Chari and Nene, Ruruka is third year Junior High student of the Jewel Academy and also their roommate. Always fashionable and yet full of life, she is a very bright and active and loves food. Also she likes to help out Chiari and the others on managing the cafe. She serves as Labra's babysitter and friend.

== Supporting characters ==
Marie Hanazono (花園まりえ, Hanazono Marie)
Voiced by: Ai Shimizu

Marie is an underclassman in the Jewel Academy and also Chiari's Rival. She is usually headstrong and always strong minded but always keeps an eye on the person she likes, especially Kosuke. She is seen alongside Nobara, who looks after suspicious things and rumors all around the academy. Marie is also very desperate on wanting to have a Magic Gem of her own as well and will do anything to gain every Jewelpet's trust to have one.

Nobara Kitajima (北島のばら, Kitajima Nobara)
Voiced by: Aya Hirano

Marie's assistant and also an underclassman in the Jewel Academy. She always yearns for Marie's goals and takes notes about what is going on, using her notebook.

Mutsumi Mochida (餅田むつみ, Mochida Mutsumi)
Voiced by: Nozomi Sasaki

One of Marie's roommates, Mutsumi is very laid back and fussy but also very supportive to Marie. She also likes to eat sweets and her favorite food is Honey Caramels.

Kosuke Sanada (真田幸介, Sanada Kōsuke)
Voiced by: Yoshimasa Hosoya

Kosuke is a first year high school student in the Jewel Academy and the most popular of the four boys in class. Despite his good looks and being a good guitarist, he is nice to the girls. Chiari has a crush on him, in which he roots forward to her on wanting to succeed. He is also the leader of the school's music band.

Juushirou Mouri (毛利十四郎, Mōri Jūshirō)
Voiced by: Jun Fukuyama

One of the four first year high school boys in the Jewel Academy, Mouri is a first year high school student who excels in sports and athletics, and having good reflexes as a member of the School's Archery Club. He is also rather goofy sometimes thought also very supportive to Sanada. Nene has a crush on him.

Taira Izumi (平和泉, Izumi Taira)
Voiced by: Miyuki Sawashiro

One of the four first year high school boys, Taira is the heartthrob of the Jewel Academy. A first year high school student who has a cute look, he is well known as the "Eternal pretty boy". He is also shown to secretly like the Jewelpets and also very knowledgeable regarding about them despite he likes to deny it. He became the part-time manager of the Rocks Cafe after learning how to make Master's special coffee.

Takumi Asano (浅野匠, Asano Takumi)
Voiced by: Ryohei Kimura

One of the four first year high school boys, Takumi is also a high school student in the Jewel Academy. An honor student, he is very bright and yet gentle. He is also a good master in chess, being a nationwide top player and champion. He always keeps his cool towards people, however, he also likes to play an Angela Petting Game in his part-time and loves Angela.

Master (マスター, Masuta)
Voiced by: Yōji Ueda

The owner of the Rocks cafe.

== Other characters ==
Ryoko Izumikawa (和泉川涼子, Izumikawa Ryōko)
Voiced by: Chinatsu Akasaki

The Chief Editor of the Jewel Academy's daily news, Ryoko is a hardworking field reporter who also hails from the same class as Chiari. She is very ambitious on wanting to get a scoop, but also supportive to Chiari and her friends. Rossa admires her.

Sachi Hakamada (袴田サチ, Hakamada Sachi)
Voiced by: Yukiyo Fujii

One of Chiari's classmates. Usually weakly willed, she is very weak in sports and doesn't like to participate in the Athletic Meet since kindergarten. However she got over it through Diana's help.

Machiko (まちこ, Machiko)
Voiced by: Ayaka Saito

Chiari's classmate. She is an aspiring manga artist who write and draws manga for Labra's as the main character. She is part of the school's manga club.

Teacher Azusa (あずさ先生, Azusa Sensei)
Voiced by: Ai Kayano

The homeroom teacher in Chiari's class. She is very nice to the students she teach and loves flowers, but can get easily moved through simple things. Azusa is also a very good teacher for the pets as well, as she can understand their feelings.

Apels Yamada (山田アーペル, Yamada āperu)
Voiced by: Kōji Yusa

The vice principal of the Jewel Academy, Apels is sometimes called the "Guardian Angel of Jewel Academy". Somewhat a narcissist, he likes to show off with his Swan Boat "Queen Swanee" and also wants attention. Jewelina sometimes calls him a "Small Fish" due to his tendencies and sometimes hates his boat to be called Potty. Apels is also one of the victims of the Red Moon's brainwashing.

School Nurse (保健室の先生, Hoken-shitsu no Sensei)
Voiced by: Yoji Ueda

The school nurse of the Jewel Academy, he is once a sailor during his youth who fell in love with Lapis several years ago. However, before he left her on his voyage, he put a special mark on his sail in hopes that they will see each other again. During a storm, his ship has sunk but he survived during the aftermath using his sail as a float. He once again met Lapis after several years, wearing his sail as his lab coat. Sango is shown to be his assistant on the clinic.

Paroma Tanaka (田中パロマ, Tanaka Paroma)
Voiced by: Yoji Ueda

The principal of the Jewel Academy. Usually mysterious, he is sometimes seen watching over Chiari's actions and has a secret relation with the Red Moon. As of the 49th episode, his appearance is actually a disguise and he's revealed to be one of Jewelina's sages.

Ayame (あやめ, Ayame)
Voiced by: Natsumi Takamori

A little girl who Peridot babysits. She is found of pudding, especially her mother's special rose petal pudding.

Draggy (ドラゴン, Doragon)
Voiced by: Hiroshi Shimozaki

Milky's friend dragon, who she took care of when it was a young egg. Although very nice, he sometimes can go berserk when exposed to the Red Moon, changing its color to red.

Saizo Sanada (真田才蔵, Sanada Saizō)
Voiced by: Masahito Yabe

Kosuke's grandfather.

Teacher Arisa (アリサ先生, Arisa sensei)
Voiced by: Ai Kayano

Azusa's relative, who runs a school exclusively for brown bears. Her personality and traits were the same as Azusa's.

Yanma (ヤンマー, Yanmā)
Voiced by: Kōji Yusa

A giant brown bear and a student of the Brown Bear School. He is close friends with Rossa in the said school and always says "Wafu~" in his speeches.

Yumika (ユミカ, Yumika)
Voiced by: Yurin

A young girl who owns a doll named "Dorothy", who looks like Coal. When Dorothy's gone missing (due to Coal mistakenly taking it because it is influenced by the Red Moon's magic), she goes around town to search for it. She ends up asking Chiari and Ruby's help on searching for the lost doll.

Dorothy (ドロシー, Doroshī) / Angel (エンジェルちゃん, Enjeru-chan)
Voiced by: Yuki Horinaka

A small doll owned by Yumika who looks exactly like Coal, but wears a bright blue dress and a medallion with several jewels decorated in it. It was brought to life by the Red Moon's magic in order to badly influence Coal on stealing it, not knowing it belongs to its original owner. Usually it gives out praises to him when he's down or to cheer him up, in which Coal likes.
