= List of Altair: A Record of Battles characters =

The following is a list of characters for the Altair: A Record of Battles series.

== Characters ==
=== Main characters ===
Tuğril "Golden Eagle" Mahmut Pasha (犬鷲の(トゥグリル)マフムート将軍(パシャ), Tuguriru Mafumūto Pasha)
Voiced by: Ayumu Murase
A 19-year-old (17 at the start of the series), Mahmut is the youngest member of the Divan and youngest to achieve the rank of Pasha. Mahmut hails from the Tuğril tribe, a village of expert falconers that was destroyed during the war with the Balt-Rhein Empire twelve years before the series. After the death of his mother and the destruction of his home, Mahmut pushes himself to pass the army entrance test at the age of twelve, and seeks perpetual peace for his country. At the beginning of the series, Mahmut has been Pasha only for a short time and lacks the maturity to understand his position. Initially idealistic and naïve, Mahmut's single-minded goal to protect his country, as well as his aloofness, has made him inconsiderate and reckless. After acting on his own to stop the Hisar Rebellion, Mahmut is temporarily demoted from Pasha and begins traveling around West Rumeliana to gain more experience outside of Turkey. After resolving the civil war, Mahmut regains his Pasha rank and is appointed to handle foreign military affairs. Mahmut's exploits against the empire continue to grant him more prestige, and he is eventually appointed second-in-command of Zağanos's Imperial Invasion army by the Divan, leading the defense of Turkey from the empire's advances, to the point of his allies start calling him "Star of Hope". For his efforts in the war, Mahmut is awarded rule over the Mızrak Province, determined to establish a trade network between Turkey and their neighboring countries in the east.
Over the course of the series, Mahmut becomes more mature and aware of the complicated politics between nations, while accepting that fighting is unavoidable sometimes, but still tries to minimize bloodshed. Mahmut's honesty, integrity, and cleverness earns the respect of those around him. Aside from possessing a high intellect and a knack for strategies, he is self-taught in Tuğril tribe falconer techniques and is able to direct his beloved tame golden eagle, Iskender, to deadly effect. Due to his youth, people outside of Greater Turkey tend to underestimate Mahmut, allowing him to catch opponents by surprise with his skills as a fighter and strategist. Mahmut is often complimented for his good looks and enjoys writing poetry in his free time. He tends to be naïve and easily flustered around women when they interact with him in a unprofessional manner and is often teased by his friends for this "weakness".
Kyros γιός Apollodorus (キュロス・イオス・アポロドロス, Kyurosu Iosu Aporodorosu)
Voiced by: KENN
Kyros is the 19-year-old (17 at the start of the series) son of the former caesar of Phoiníkē, Apollodorus, with whom he has a very estranged relationship. Kyros has a rebellious nature and is reluctant to follow in his father's footsteps, which entices him to become the Phoiníkē spy for Süleyman. After the fall of his home, Kyros becomes Mahmut's traveling companion and joins him in his efforts to stop the Balt-Rhein Empire, hoping to one day to reclaim his homeland. In comparison to the more naïve and polite Mahmut, Kyros is more street-wise, sarcastic, and temperamental, though he is able to conduct himself in formal matters. Since Venedik failed to aid Phoiníkē, Kyros holds a grudge against them and was distrustful of Abiriga as a result, but has come to respect him and be more friendly towards him as they travel together. Being a Phoiníkē noble and a citizen of a harbor town, Kyros is well-educated in sea warfare and is knowledgeable about different parts of the world. Although he does not battle often, Kyros is a capable fighter and owns a galley ship back in Phoiníkē with a crew made up of his childhood friends. He continues to put his espionage skills to use as he travels with Mahmut, as he is usually tasked to handle things outside of battle and acts as a liaison for Turkey with Süleyman as the Great Rumeliana War escalates.
Abiriga (アビリガ)
Voiced by: Junichi Suwabe
A 30-year-old (28 at the start of the series) former slave from Tharros, Abiriga is the first mate of Captain Silvestro Brega of the Venedik fleet and Brega's adopted son. When he was thirteen, Abiriga was sold off by his biological parents, but was able to escape and then saved by Brega, who paid for his freedom and took him in. After testing Mahmut's worth and being "purchased" for his services, he is assigned to Mahmut to be his companion and to spy on Turkey's activities for Venedik. Although Mahmut treats him as an equal, Abiriga respectfully addresses Mahmut as "Padrone" and diligently carries out his orders. Despite joining Mahmut out of duty, Abiriga comes to respect him greatly and proves to be a valuable ally, even delaying his reports to Venedik in order to see the end results of Mahmut's plans. Abiriga possesses high-level agility and very few people can match him in battle. He knows many forms of combat and weaponry, carrying numerous weapons that are hidden under his long coat, but prefers to use a long blowpipe as his default weapon. Having trained and groomed himself to serve Brega to the best of his ability, Abiriga is mature, level-headed, courteous, and usually sports a placid smile on his face.

=== Greater Turkey ===
Greater Turkey is a federation made up of five stratocracies — Turkey, Mızrak, Balta, Biçki, and Kiliç — founded 75 years before the series. While the other four are ruled by a sultan, the Turkey stratocracy is the largest of the five, being the dominating power of Greater Turkey and is ruled by the Divan. Turkey stratocracy is divided into thirteen provinces governed by a Vizier and its capital city is Altın. Greater Turkey is very wealthy and the Turks are well known for their equestrian skills. Among the Tripartite Military Alliance and other anti-imperialists nations, Turkey contributes the most to the war efforts against Balt-Rhein and is the leading force against them.

==== Turkey Stratocracy ====
Zehir "Poison" Zağanos Pasha (毒薬の(ゼヘル)ザガノス将軍(パシャ), Zeheru Zaganosu Pasha)
Voiced by: Makoto Furukawa
At 28-year-old (26 at the start of the series), Zağanos is the second youngest of the Divan, attaining the rank of Pasha when he was nineteen, and one of the 13 Pashas who is a Vizier. He is the governor of the 1st Province of the Turkey stratocracy and has forged a spy network throughout the continent. Calculating and ambitious, Zağanos is part of the war faction of the Divan and wishes to stop Balt-Rhein's expansion war at all costs. He has no qualms in making ruthless decisions to further his goals, and seeks to reorganize the Anti-Imperial Alliance to a hegemony dominated by Turkey. Despite clashing with Mahmut occasionally, Zağanos develops a level of respect for him, though he is also willing to take advantage of Mahmut when it suits him. He is known as the "Poison General" due to his interest in botany and has a large collection of poisons. It is later revealed that Zağanos is a former citizen of the Balt-Rhein Empire and the son of the former Hermann, Marquis Camus, and his real name is "Astolphe". He holds a deep grudge against the empire for ruining his family and uses his in-depth knowledge of the empire to gain the upper hand in the war against them. After the war, Zağanos is awarded rule over the recently-annexed Balt-Rhein territories, becoming the de-facto ruler of his former country of birth.
Kara Kanat "Black Wings" Süleyman (黒翼の(カラ・カネット)スレイマン, Kara Kanetto Sureiman)
Voiced by: Katsuyuki Konishi
A 35-year-old (33 at the start of the series) man, Süleyman is a spymaster known as the Göz Kulak Başkan ("chief of eyes and ears") of the Turkey spy network for Zağanos and constantly travels around the world to maintain its efficiency. Like Mahmut, he is a survivor from the Tuğril tribe, having been away from the village during its destruction. Süleyman is a former assistant of Giovanni di Orsani, but left his service once he heard of the Tuğril tribe massacre. Devastated over his family's death, Süleyman wandered aimlessly over Turkey until he met a fourteen-year-old Zağanos and took up his offer to forge a spy network five years later. Süleyman is typically easy-going and friendly, allowing him to befriend others and help build the spy network. After meeting Mahmut for the first time, Süleyman becomes a mentor-like figure to him and shares the same desire to maintain peace for Turkey. As a falconer, he owns a golden eagle named Caterina and is able to direct her to deadly effect in combat.
Şehir Halil Pasha (大都市の(シェヒル)カリル将軍(パシャ), Shehiru Kariru Pasha)
Voiced by: Kenichi Ogata
At 70-year-old (68 at the start of the series), Halil is the eldest member of the Divan, governor of the 7th Province, and one of the 13 Pashas that hold the rank of Vizier. Halil is the most influential Pasha among the pacifist faction in the Divan. A wise and peaceful man who specializes in Urban design, Halil devotes himself to war restorations after the first war with Balt-Rhein and his jovial yet grounded personality makes him well-respected and well-loved by all. He is Mahmut's adopted father and mentor, though he never shields Mahmut from the consequences of his actions and encourages him to learn from his mistakes. During the second war against Balt-Rhein, Haili is appointed general of the expedition army, but is later killed in battle against General Pineau's army. Besides being Mahmut's foster father, Halil has a wife and children, who are still alive.
Büyük Pasha (大将軍(ビュラクパシャ), Byuraku Pasha)
Voiced by: Takaya Kuroda
Referred to only by his title, Büyük Pasha, or "Great Pasha", is the 42-year-old (41 at the start of the series) highest rank Pasha of the Divan and is the head of Turkey stratocracy. As such, he oversees the Divan's meetings and acts as the mediator when discussing administration and wartime affairs. He places a lot of trust in Zağanos and often favors his suggestions on political and military issues.
Shara (シャラ)
Voiced by: Yōko Hikasa
An 18-year-old (16 at the start of the series) girl, Shara is a member of the Lir Esnaf (Lyre Guild), the most popular all-female theater troupe in Turkey, and constantly plays the female leads. Energetic, bold, and friendly, Shara is a good friend to both Mahmut and Ibrahim, and is always willing to help them.
Şapka "Hat" Ibrahim Vali (飾り帽子の(シャプカ)イブラヒム総督(バリ), Shapuka Iburahimu Bari)
Voiced by: Takuya Satō
Ibrahim is the 26-year-old (24 at the start of the series) governor of Hisar village in Turkey's 1st Province, and is therefore Zağanos's subordinate and a Binbashi. During his time in the military school, Ibrahim befriends Mahmut, becoming the only person to get close to him and actively encourages Mahmut to be more social. A kind and loving person, Ibrahim has a wife and twin sons who also reside in Hisar.
Tesisat-Kapı Saruça Pasha (水門の(テシサトゥ・カプ)サルジャ将軍(パシャ), Teshisatu Kapu Saruja Pasha)
Voiced by: Shinji Kawada
Saruça is the 29-year-old governor of the 3rd Province, and one of the 13 Pashas that also hold the rank of Vizier. The Tesisat-Kapı clan is the oldest clan in Greater Turkey and his family has always been on good terms with the four sultanates. Saruça is a supporter of the sultanates' apparent desire to gain equal power to the Turkey stratocracy, to the point of refusing to believe that they are involved with Balt-Rhein in any way. When tasked to make sure the four sultans attend Orhan's wedding in order to enact an assassination, Saruça tells Balaban about the plot instead and is later killed on the latter's orders.
Kurt Kurt Pasha (狼の(クルト)クルト将軍(パシャ), Kuruto Kuruto Pasha)
Voiced by: Subaru Kimura
Kurt is a 37-year-old (36 at the start of the series) Pasha from the 8th Province and one of the generals that serve under Halil's expedition army. After Halil's death, Kurt is assigned to serve under Mahmut's command and soon becomes a close and loyal companion to him. Bold and honorable, Kurt is a very gregarious individual who always speaks his mind when he does not agree with something. After the war, Kurt Kurt is appointed the new governor of Chielo.
Ahmet (アフメット, Afumetto)
Voiced by: Shun Horie
Ahmet is a 17-year-old (15 at the start of the series) soldier from the 7th Province and serves in Halil's expedition army. After Halil's death and taking part in resolving the Chielo conflict, Ahmet is assigned to serve directly under Mahmut's command and is promoted to Binbashi. Ahmet is thoughtful and kind, though his youth and rank make him a little inexperienced in some matters.
Mimar Zeki Pasha (建築家の(ミマール)ゼキ将軍(パシャ), Mimāru Zeki Pasha)
Voiced by: Shunsuke Takeuchi
Zeki is a 25-year-old (23 at the start of the series) Pasha that serves under Mahmut's command and one of Halil's former students from his urban planning class. According to Nurcan, Zeki graduated in the top of his class and is one of Turkey's finest architects, while being known for working quickly and efficiently. Although he is somewhat headstrong and candid, he cares for Halil dearly and wants to preserve his legacy after his death. He is strict with Mahmut and is often at odds with Zağanos, who seems to contradict Halil's ideology, and is not afraid to speak against him.
Şanslar Nurcan Pasha (幸運の(シャンスル)ヌルザーン将軍(パシャ))
Voiced by: Tsubasa Yonaga
Nurcan is a 25-year-old (23 at the start of the series) Pasha that serves under Mahmut's command and is a close friend of Zeki. Nurcan has known Zeki for a long time, even before entering military school together. Cheerful and light-hearted, Nurcan often sports a smile on his face and enjoys teasing Zeki, much to his annoyance.
Antal Cemil Pasha (蹄鉄の(アナトル)ジェミル将軍(パシャ), Anatoru Jemiru Pasha)
Cemil is a Pasha from the 1st province and a first steward official, thus making him Zağanos's subordinate. A serious and loyal supporter of Zağanos, Cemil acts as one of his confidantes and serves as one of his generals in the Imperial Invasion army. Strategic and observant, he often bickers with the more tactless İlkay and keeps him in line.
Deve İlkay Pasha (駱駝の(デヴェ)イルカイ将軍(パシャ), Deve Irukai Pasha)
İlkay is a Pasha from the 1st province and a first steward official, thus making him Zağanos's subordinate. He has an aggressive personality and is part of Zağanos's war faction, acting as one of his confidantes and generals in the Imperial Invasion army. İlkay enjoys fighting and often bickers with Cemil, who reins in his wildness.
Abbas (アッバス, Abbasu)
Voiced by: Masao Komaya
Abbas is a 51-year-old (50 at the start of the series) soldier from the 7th Province and serves in Halil's expedition army. Alongside Ahmet, he acts as Halil's aide, and though he displays an impetuous attitude, he always follows Halil's lead. During a battle with General Pineau's army, Abbas is killed alongside Halil.
Roxelana (ロクセラーナ, Rokuserāna)
Roxelana is the 29-year-old (28 at the start of the series) leader of the all-female theater troupe, Lir Esnaf (Lyre Guild). She is cool-headed and is aware of the power that her theatrical plays have over the audience.
Coco (ココ, Koko)
Coco is a 17-year-old (16 at the start of the series) member of Lir Esnaf and a friend of Shara. Innocent and naive, Coco tends to believe that theatrical portrayals that are based on real-life events are one and the same.
Koran (コラン)
Koran is a 17-year-old (16 at the start of the series) member of Lir Esnaf that tends to perform the male lead in plays. Koran is a tomboy and more realistic than Coco.

==== Four Sultanates ====
Al-Kaplan "Red Tiger" Balaban (紅虎の(アル・カプラン)バラバン, Aru Kapuran Baraban)
Voiced by: Kazuya Nakai
Balaban is the 34-year-old third generation Sultan of the Mızrak stratocracy, inheriting the title from his father, Yıldırım Usman, after he died 12 years ago during the first war with Balt-Rhein. After his father's death, Balaban blames Turkey for making Mızrak go to war and vows to make Mızrak independent from Turkey. When Balt-Rhein promises to help Mızrak become independent, Balaban conspires with them to incite Turkey into a civil war. Balaban possesses a sharp mind and charismatic presence, making Mızrak more prosperous than his father's reign and is an efficient leader. However, his short-tempered, prideful, and brutal personality makes him underestimate his foes and causes people to be fearful of him. Balaban is willing to use his family members to achieve his goals and kill them if they got in his way, despite sharing a good relationship with them in the past. Balaban and his younger brother, Beyazit, were very close, but their relationship ends tragically when Balaban becomes blinded by his own ambitions, forcing Beyazit to kill him to stop the civil war. Balaban is strongly hinted to be homosexual and enjoys surrounding himself with beautiful men, even offering Mahmut a place in his Yeniçeri. Balaban owns a tame tiger named Al-Sakal, who is cared for by Beyazit after his death and later dies beside his younger brother during Lelederik's invasion of Turkey.
Ulema Beyazit (聖官の(ウレマー)バヤジット, Uremā Bayajitto)
Voiced by: Kōki Uchiyama
Beyazit is the 28-year-old (26 at the start of the series) fourth generation and current Sultan of the Mızrak stratocracy, the youngest child of Yıldırım Usman, and a spy for Zağanos's spy network that is stationed in the territory. Unlike Balaban, Beyazit has a sweet temperament and a gentle demeanor, and strives to stop Balaban from endangering Turkey. Despite coming into conflict with Balaban, Beyazit loves his brother deeply, to the point of considering him to be the most important person in his life. After killing Balaban, Beyazit is left emotionally scarred, believing that his brother's spirit watches over him and tries to honor his brother's memory by protecting Mızrak. Being a knowledgeable scholar, Beyazit has access to many foreign items from around the world along with their mechanics, which helps revolutionize his country's warfare weaponry. Despite his dislike towards violence and destructive weapons, Beyazit follows Zağanos's orders to help Vasco build cannons in order to combat Balt-Rhein. During Lelederik's invasion of Turkey, Beyazit dies after being severely wounded by Glalat and reunites with Balaban in the afterlife.
Nilüfer Fatma (水蓮の(ニリュフェル)ファトマ, Niryuferu Fatoma)
Voiced by: Yumi Tōma
Fatma is the 34-year-old (32 at the start of the series) third generation Sultan of the Balta stratocracy and the sister of Balaban and Beyazit that married into the Balta clan. After her husband's death four years before the series, Fatma was made sultan in accordance with his will until their son, Kemal, turns fifteen. However, many political figures were against Fatma being sultan and wanted Cassim (her husband's younger brother) to rule instead. After Balaban had Cassim killed, Fatma becomes a puppet to Balaban's ambitions and submits to him in order to protect her children from anyone who opposes Kemal's ascension to the throne. After the civil war, Fatma is spared from death, though she is publicly announced to be dead, and is staying in a house on the outskirts of the Kiliç stratocracy. This arrangement allows her children to see her in secret whenever they want and Kiliç Orhan frequently visits her to keep her company.
Armut Ayşe (洋梨の(アルムト)アイシェ, Arumuto Aishe)
Voiced by: Ai Kayano
Ayşe is the 19-year-old (17 at the start of the series) daughter of Sultan Fatma, Kemal's elder sister, and niece of Sultan Balaban and Beyazit. Sharp-minded and blunt, Ayşe is the Hanım of the Balta stratocracy, though her strong-willed nature makes her act and take charge of things beyond her position. She is engaged to Kiliç Orhan and accepts the fact that it is her duty to marry him. Although she has simply sees him as a friend, she respects their courtship and encourages Orhan to become a worthy leader and husband to her one day. Since childhood, she has been in love with Beyazit, but she is aware that he does not return her romantic feelings and loves her as family. After the civil war, she holds the title of Vizier-i-Azam and helps Kemal rule until he turns fifteen.
Kemal (ケマル, Kemaru)
Voiced by: Reika Uyama
Kemal is the 11-year-old (10 at the start of the series) fourth generation and current Sultan of the Balta stratocracy and the youngest child of Sultan Fatma. Due to his youth, Kemal's ascension to the throne is initially delayed and his mother is made sultan in accordance with his father's will until he turns fifteen. At the end of the civil war, it was Kemal's pleas that made Mahmut spare his mother from death and promise to eliminate anyone that would oppose Kemal's claim to the throne. His older sister Ayşe is his appointed guardian, going to important meetings in his place and tutoring him so he will be able to rule on his own once he is fifteen.
Yağ "Oil" Uzun (油商の(ヤグ)ウズン, Yagu Uzun)
Voiced by: Shirō Saitō
Uzun is the 45-year-old second-generation Sultan of the Biçki stratocracy and Ismail's father. He has a total of seventy-seven sons, sending all of them to be raised by leaders of influential merchant companies as soon as they are born. A cowardly and greedy man, Uzun was persuaded by Balt-Rhein to rebel against Turkey with the promise of more wealth, but was slain by Ismail during the civil war in order to gain the throne.
Silâh Ismail (武器商の(スイラーフ)イスマイル, Suirāfu Isumairu)
Voiced by: Nobuhiko Okamoto
Ismail is the 18-year-old (16 at the start of the series) third generation and current Sultan of the Biçki stratocracy, and the 45th son of Yağ Uzun. Raised by the leader of the Jin company since he was born, Ismail has no loyalty to his father and despises him. Possessing an excellent business acumen, Ismail finds his father's road construction plans with Balt-Rhein to be unbeneficial and joins Mahmut to stop him to the point of personally killing his father to get the throne. Although he always looks for ways to make profit, Ismail has integrity, which his father lacks, as he honors his deals and refuses to act against the interests of Greater Turkey. Despite being sultan, Ismail continues to conduct and leave the capital city frequently on business trips.
Yüz-Maske "100 Masks" Selim (百面の(ユズ・マスカ)セリム, Yuzu Masuka Serimu)
Voiced by: Hozumi Gōda
Selim is the 41-year-old second-generation Sultan of the Kiliç stratocracy and the strong-willed and assertive father of Orhan. A very private individual, Selim always wears a mask to hide his face so other people won't read his expressions. To preserve his weaker country from Balaban's wrath as well as Balt-Rhien, Selim is forced to cooperate with them and start a civil war. Although he was willing to aid Mahmut and his allies in assassinating the other sultans, he betrays them once the ruse was discovered and tries to harm Ayşe. In order to protect her, Orhan stabs Selim, much to his surprise, as he did not expect to see his timid son take action. Proud that Orhan has finally begun to choose a path for himself, Selim encourages his son not to regret the decisions that he will make as the new sultan before he succumbs to his wounds and dies.
Kiliç Orhan (剣の(クルチュ)オルハン, Kuruchu Oruhan)
Voiced by: Nobunaga Shimazaki
Orhan is the 21-year-old (19 at the start of the series) third generation and current Sultan of the Kiliç stratocracy, Sultan Selim's son, and the betrothed of Ayşe, whom he has known since childhood. Unlike the other sultans, Orhan is weak-willed and soft-hearted, often being indecisive and a little oblivious to politics. After fatally killing his father to protect Ayşe, Orhan slowly begins to mature, though he is still too timid to voice his thoughts. Although he loves Ayşe dearly, he knows that she loves Beyazit, but his father comforts him with the prospect that she might come to love him one day and encourages Orhan to become a sultan worthy of her.

=== Balt-Rhein Empire ===
The Baltic and Rhein Empire, commonly shorten as "Balt-Rhein", is made of two large, mountainous regions of land. Due to the lack of fertile soil in many areas (mostly in the Baltic region) and the cold climate, the empire has many poverty-stricken regions and poor domestic affairs outside of the capital city of St. Michael. As a result, the empire is highly expansionistic and aggressive, earning the hatred and fear of other nations for their merciless and tyrannical treatment of places they have conquered. Balt-Rhein is also very politically unstable as the government's treasury is nearly empty and many different factions exist with their own agendas. As the series progresses, it loses most of its foreign territories and is reduced to just the Baltic region, which is conquered in the end of the war, becoming one of Turkey's provinces ruled by Zağanos.

Virgilio Louis (ビルヒリオ・ルイ, Biruhirio Rui)
Voiced by: Kenjiro Tsuda
Louis is the 35-year-old (33 at the start of the series) Prime Minister of the Balt-Rhein Empire, gaining the position 5 years before the series, and the man behind its expansionist policies. He is highly intelligent and scheming, employing various strategies and conspiracies to expand the imperial Balt-Rhein territory by invading other nations. Although he aspires to make Balt-Rhein into a great empire, he cares little of the territories they annexed and has no qualms in sacrificing imperial citizens to achieve his goals. Louis is very arrogant that his plans will make the empire emerge victorious and retains his hubris in the face of failure. His family has assisted the imperial family's finances for a long time, which grants him a lot of political power that prevents anyone from opposing his plans, including Emperor Goldbalt IX. Among his supporters, Louis has a sexual relationship with his friend and colleague, Simon Blanchard.
Lelederik (レレデリク, Rerederiku)
Voiced by: Yuu Kobayashi
Lelederik is the 28-year-old (26 at the start of the series) Duchess of the Balt-Rhein Empire's Ellvaldesberg territory and Emperor Goldbalt XI's niece. Her father, Alfred (Goldbalt's younger brother) and her older brother Alfred are both dead, making her third-in-line to inherit the throne after her cousins. She is a skilled fighter and leads her own unit that specialize in mountain infantry, though she lost a large portion of it during the Phoiníkē invasion. Although she takes part in Louis's military campaign and often acts as a diplomat, Lelederik dislikes Louis and sometimes takes actions that goes against his plans. She is very belligerent and prefers outright conquest over Louis's machinations and allowance for a peaceful surrender. She is killed by Mahmut while attempting to capture Altın in the last battle of the war.
Glalat Bellrik (グララット・ベルルリック, Guraratto Berururikku)
Voiced by: Takahiro Sakurai
A 27-year-old (25 at the start of the series) Ellvaldesberg nobleman and aide to Lelederik, whom he has known since they were children. Glalat is a highly capable soldier under Lelederik's command, joining her as a soldier or a diplomat to further Louis's plans for the sake of his homeland. However, Glalat dislikes Louis and is willing to follow Lelederik's orders that contradict Louis's plans. Glalat is stoic and shares the same callousness that Lelederik has towards people and the bloodshed they create, even to his fellow countrymen. He is killed during the battle of Altın.
Emperor Goldbalt XI (ゴルドバルト11世, Gorudobaruto Jūichisei)
Voiced by: Atsushi Ono
At 56 years old (54 at the start of the series), Goldbalt XI is the dignified and stoic current ruler of the Balt-Rhein Empire. Although he is fully aware of Louis's schemes, Goldbalt passively allows Louis to take charge of the empire's expansionist campaign since the imperial family is dependent on his family's financial contributions and seemingly shares Louis's belief that the empire must keep conquering other nations in order to survive. Aside from being Lelederik's uncle, Goldbalt has two sons named Gunther and Gustav. Following Balt-Rhein's defeat, he is executed.
Ryan Law (ライアン・ロゥ, Raian Rou)
Voiced by: Kenji Yamauchi
An 88-year-old (86 at the start of the series) man, Law is the Admiral Balt-Rhein Imperial Navy and is charged with keeping Phoiníkē and its trade routes secure. Unlike most of the Balt-Rhein army, Law takes no pleasure in military conquest and tries to avoid unnecessary violence, but diligently carries out his duties when prompted. As his hometown Vaissel was once part of the Law Kingdom that had an alliance with Phoiníkē, it saddens Law to play a part in its downfall. He is often seen with his aide and right-hand man, Legatus, who he has an amicable relationship with and is comfortable confiding his personal thoughts to.
Simon Blanchard (シモン・ブランシャール, Shimon Buranshāru)
Simon is the 29-year-old (27 at the start of the series) Minister of Finance and Louis's confidant. Although he supports Louis's plans, he isn't afraid to voice his concerns when he sees those plans are foiled. He knows Louis very well, being the only person to see past his bravado and has a sexual relationship with him. After the war, Simon's merits are recognized by the Turkish government, who grants him the title of Pasha.
Duke Eisenstein (エイゼンシュテイン公爵, Eizenshutein Kōshaku)
Voiced by: Jin Urayama
Eisenstein is a 97-year-old (95 at the start of the series) Imperial Adviser and has served well over 75 years since Emperor Goldbalt's father's reign. Eisenstein is the only politician that openly opposed Louis's militant schemes, constantly arguing to stop the wars and improve domestic affairs, but his warnings go unheeded. However, there are a few that share his anti-war policy and secretly devise their own plot to save the empire. After the war, Eisenstein's merits are recognized by the Turkish government, who grants him the title of Pasha.
Nicolo (ニコロ, Nikoro)
Voiced by: Misaki Watada
Nicolo is a 14-year-old (12 at the start of the series) page in the Balt-Rhein castle since he was seven. Bright and intelligent, Nicolo attends to Louis often, who is also fond of Nicolo and quizzes him on subjects.

==== Imperial Army ====
Lily Kokoschka (リリー・ココシュカ, Rirī Kokoshuka)
Voiced by: Mariya Ise
Lily is the 25-year-old (24 at the start of the series) military supervisor and a loyal supporter of Louis's military campaign, serving as his eyes on the front lines and sharing his callous disregard for the bloodshed the army causes in the war. She is also Louis's secretary and former student, learning cartography from him and using topography to predict the enemies' movements and ambush them. She is later killed during a battle between Balt-Rhein and the Anti-Imperial Alliance.
Corentin Pineau (コランタン・ピノー, Korantan Pinō)
Voiced by: Rikiya Koyama
Pineau is the 46-year-old (44 at the start of the series) General of the Balt-Rhein army, and was a participant in the war with Turkey twelve years before the series. Despite his intimidating appearance and diligently performing his duties, he is an honorable person, greatly detesting the suffering the empire causes, and is part of Duke Eisenstein's anti-war faction. Pineau tries his best to restrain his army from abusing innocent people and strictly punishing anyone that breaks the military code. Unknown to Mahmut, he was the general in charge of the unit that destroyed the Tuğril tribe, though he didn't have any part in the slaughter. During a battle between Balt-Rhein and the Anti-Imperial Alliance, Pineau graciously accepts his death and allows himself to be beheaded by Mahmut.
Johan Frentzen (ヨハン・フレンツェン, Yohan Furentsen)
Voiced by: Toshiyuki Toyonaga
Frentzen is the 35-year-old (33 at the start of the series) commander of the 1st battalion and a member of Duke Eisenstein's anti-war faction. Born as a commoner, Frentzen and his childhood friend Adam volunteered for the army, hoping to raise in rank to reform Balt-Rhein from within one day. Frentzen is born with a poor constitution and regularly has to take medicine, but he is a gifted soldier and has a very sharp intuition, making predictions that often turns out to be accurate. After General Pineau's death, he briefly becomes General of the Balt-Rhein army station in South Rumeliana before dying in a sword fight against Mahmut.
Anton Adam (アントン・アダム, Anton Adamu)
Voiced by: Mitsuaki Kanuka
Adam is the 35-year-old (33 at the start of the series) commander of the 2nd battalion and a member of Duke Eisenstein's anti-war faction. Like his childhood friend Frentzen, Adam is a commoner who volunteered for the army, hoping to raise in rank to reform Balt-Rhein from within one day. Despite his wide girth, Adam is quite agile and possesses formidable physical strength, being able to fight and skillfully command his battalion simultaneously. After General Pineau's death, he briefly becomes Lieutenant General of the Balt-Rhein army station in South Rumeliana before dying in a battle against Abiriga.
Dirk Wichter (ディルク・ヴィヒター, Diruku Vihitā)
Wichter is a 26-year-old (as of Chapter 99) soldier stationed under Frentzen's command and a good friend to him and Adam. He is part of Duke Eisenstein's anti-war faction and takes charge of the remaining South Rumeliana troops after Frentzen is killed in battle. After reuniting to Duke Eisenstein, Dirk and the remnants of the Sud army secretly joins Lelederik's Turkey invasion campaign and is reassigned as the 8th battalion's commander.
Theo Androsch (テオ・アンドロシュ, Teo Andoroshu)
Androsch is the former Lieutenant General of the Balt-Rhein army who retired from the army after the first war with Greater Turkey, and is a cautious and shrewd strategist. Due to General Pineau's and Frentzen's deaths, Androsch is pulled out of retirement and appointed General to lead the defensive battle at the Murs stronghold. Much like his predecessors, Androsch dislikes Louis and is not afraid to voice his disagreement with him, though he knows that Louis uses his political power to manipulate Androsch into following his orders.
Anselm Tott (アンセルム・トット, Anserumu Totto)
Tott is the former commander of the 3rd battalion and the current commander of the 1st battalion after Frentzen's death. Compare to the other army commanders, Tott has a very mild-mannered and timid disposition. While apparently clumsy and viewing himself as useless, Tott is actually a competent commander and possesses a keen intuition.
Volker Winkelmann (フォルカー・ヴィンケルマン, Forukā Vinkeruman)
Voiced by: Tomoyuki Shimura
Bertz is the 39-year-old (38 at the start of the series) commander of the 5th battalion and seems to be one of the more humble commanders in the army. During a battle between Balt-Rhein and the Anti-Imperial Alliance, he and his division are killed trying to stall the Turkish army as the rest of the army retreats from Murmullo basin.
Gilbert Kirchel (ギルベルト・キルヘル, Giruberuto Kiruheru)
Voiced by: Mutsumi Sasaki
Kirchel is the 49-year-old (48 at the start of the series) commander of the 6th battalion and the oldest among other commanders in the army. He is inquisitive, seemingly less up-to-date with the military developments Louis has spearheaded in the army. He is often quick to offer his thoughts in meetings to his fellow officers, especially Schübel and Hassler. During Balt-Rhein and the Anti-Imperial Alliance, he and his division are killed trying to stall the Turkish army as the rest of the army retreats to Espada.
Elmer Schmidt (エルマー・シュミット, Erumā Shumitto)
Voiced by: Genki Okawa
Schmidt is the 29-year-old (28 at the start of the series) commander of the 7th battalion and one of the more hot-blooded commanders in the army. Arrogant and aggressive, Schmidt prefers to rely on brute force during the battle against Anti-Imperial Alliance, which makes him reckless. While being shot by a volley of arrows by the Turkish army, Schmidt tries to rally his frightened men before getting killed while clutching his spear that prevents his body from falling to the ground.
Alois Reuss (アロイス・ロイス, Aroisu Roisu)
Voiced by: Kentarō Itō
Reuss is the 48-year-old (46 at the start of the series) commander of the 8th battalion and possesses a warrior spirit. He is shown to be confident in his skills and in his battalion, almost to the point of arrogance, resulting in making fatal mistakes in his encounters with Mahmut and the Anti-Imperial Alliance. After his battalion is defeated, he chooses to take responsibility for his loss by charging into battle, despite his own injuries, and is killed by Kurt, who found his last deed to be admirable.
Klaus Altdorfer (クラウス・アルトドルファー, Kurausu Arutodorufā)
Voiced by: Eiji Hanawa
Altdorfer is the 30-year-old (29 at the start of the series) commander of the 9th battalion and one of the more stoic commanders in the army. When tasked to invade Espada, he and his division fail to complete their mission as they were largely outnumbered by Lince mercenaries. Near the end of the battle with Anti-Imperial Alliance, Altdorfer's death is never shown, but he is presumably killed with the rest of the high-ranking personnel or taken prisoner.
Daniel Bieger (ダニエル・ビーガー, Danieru Bīgā)
Voiced by: Setsuji Satō
Bieger is the 30-year-old (29 at the start of the series) commander of the 10th battalion and seems to be the most realistic, grounded commander in the army. During the battle against Anti-Imperial Alliance, he was shown to lack the arrogance that many of his comrades have, clearly seeing they were overpowered by the enemies. He displays a dry, sardonic wit and is a good, frank commander to his battalion, straightforwardly letting them know they won't get out of the battle alive and gives them the option to surrender. Nevertheless, he chooses stand by his duties and dies trying to defend Pineau from the Turkish army.
Cornelia Nord (コルネリア・ノール, Koruneria Nōru)
Voiced by: Yō Taichi
Nord is the 26-year-old (25 at the start of the series) commander of the 11th battalion and the only female member in the army, aside from supervisor Lily. She is shown to be rather hot-headed and brash, resulting in giving commands too quickly before observing her surroundings during the battle against the Anti-Imperial Alliance. Despite realizing that she can't win against Anti-Imperial Alliance, she chooses to die fighting and rally her battalion to do the same, and is shortly killed by a Turkish soldier.
Christhard Bertz (クリストハルト・ベルツ, Kurisutoharuto Berutsu)
Voiced by: Daichi Endō
Bertz is the 26-year-old (25 at the start of the series) commander of the 12th battalion and is tasked with delivering provisions to the main army when they were preparing to siege the Republic of Chielo. When Mahmut leads a raiding attack on Bertz and his division, he impulsively leads his men into a fire trap set inside of Chielo and is burned alive.

==== Hermann ====
In the native Baltic language, "Hermann" means "warrior" and it is a title given to aristocrats that possess their own private armies of knights. In exchange for recognizing their fiefdoms, Hermann and their armies are sworn to aid the Emperor when called upon. Although Hermanns once took part in expansion wars with the standing army long ago, they have been inactive from any role in the military, mostly appearing in jousting matches nowadays, and are unaccustomed to modern warfare.

Jacques Jourdain (ジャック・ジョルダン侯爵, Jakku Jorudan Kōshaku)
Jacques is the 18-year-old (in his first appearance) Marquis of Jourdain and one of the few Hermann that adhere to Emperor's call to help with the defense of Murs. Patriotic and proud of his Hermann liege, Jacques is eager and impatient to go into battle against the Turkish army. Jacques's sense of duty comes from his desire to fulfill his father's wish to fight for the empire, who died two years before the Hermann are finally called upon to fight for Balt-Rhein. During a failed attack against Zağanos, Jacques and Siegfried are offered a chance to surrender to Zağanos, who explains that the empire wants to take over their fiefdoms should they die and that reinforcements will not arrive to save them. Despite being outnumbered, Jacques refuses to believe Zağanos out of loyalty towards his father's dream and tries to attack him, but is quickly killed by Siegfried.
Siegfried Kaufmann (ジークフリート・カウフマン伯爵, Jīkufurīto Kaufuman Kakushaku)
Siegfried is the 25-year-old (in his first appearance) Count of Cave and one of the few Hermann that adhere to the Emperor's call to help with the defense of Murs. Calm and level-headed, Siegfried is more politically aware that the empire is losing power than Jacques. Siegfried and the Kaufmann black knights are hailed as the best Hermann in the empire. During a failed attack against Zağanos, Siegfried and Jacques are offered a chance to surrender to Zağanos, who explains that the empire wants to take over their fiefdoms should they die and that reinforcements won't arrive to save them. Having finally lost faith in the empire, Siegfried kills Jacques and pledges his allegiance to Zağanos.

==== Röd Orm ====
Röd Orm, or "Cult of the Red Snake", are a group of iron-weapon makers in the Baltic territory, Röd Berg, and their iron manufacturing skills are kept secret. The empire makes use of their cutting-edge engineering technology for the war and Louis hires the group to assist in the empire's military movement. On Louis's orders, Röd Orm members travel around the Rumeliana to dismantle Turkey's spy network and Balt-Rhein's 13th battalion are made solely of Röd Orm. All members are skilled fighters and wear an eye-patch or half-mask.

Colbert (コルベール, Korubēru)
Voiced by: Daiki Hamano
Colbert is a young, stoic, and callous member of Röd Orm and the one the leads Louis's scheme to take over of Hisar village alongside his partner Eleanor. During the Hisar rebellion, he fights with Mahmut and is killed by Mahmut.
Eleanor (エレノア, Erenoa)
Voiced by: Toa Yukinari
Eleanor is a 26-year-old (24 at the start of the series) female member of Röd Orm that often takes part of in Louis's more shady schemes. Mahmut encounters her numerous times while she was in Turkey and gains a scar on her face during one of their clashes, causing her to form a grudge against him. After nearly getting killed by Mahmut and losing her right hand, she returns to the empire to help destroy Turkish spies.
Tristan Baret (トリスタン・バレ, Torisutan Bare)
Voiced by: Ryū Yamaguchi
Tristan is a 38-year-old (36 at the start of the series) Röd Orm member and the commander of the Balt-Rhein 13th battalion. He takes part in the front lines against the war with the Tripartite Military Alliance. As the leader of the engineering unit, Tristan is well-versed in weaponry and is a siege expert. After General Pineau's and Frentzen's deaths, Tristan becomes Lieutenant General under Theo Androsch to defend Murs at St. Michael.

=== Centro's city-states ===
Located all over Rumeliana, there are twelve independent and influential city-states that face the Centro sea, and mostly specialize in mercantile trade, with a few exceptions. The most prominent ones are in West Rumeliana: Phoiníkē, Republic of Venedik, Republic of L'isonlani, and Republic of Chielo. 3,000 years ago, Phoiníkē was once an empire that conquered most of the continent and the culture still holds much influence on other cultures in the present day. Unlike the Balt-Rhein Empire, the Phoiníkē Empire is well-respected for its fair treatment of the people and their diverse culture. Nowadays, Phoiníkē is a prosperous harbor city, and shares a long-time alliance with Venedik until Balt-Rhein conquered it. Two years after the conquest, Venedik liberates it from the empire's control and finally restores order to the Centro.

==== Venedik ====
The most powerful nation of the "Centro", founded by immigrants that took refuge in the lagoons to escape from invading equestrian tribes. It is a republic ruled by a Doge and a Senate made of noble merchants and military commanders. In order to preserve its hegemonic place in naval trades, Venedik's merchants are subjected to strict and severe laws. Any transgressors is subjected to exile as punishment, no matter the name or social position. Thanks to its captains' experiences, Venedik is possesses the most powerful naval fleet of all Rumeliana and the most deadly naval infantry.

Doge Antonio Lucio (アントニオ・ルチオ, Antonio Ruchio)
Voiced by: Daisuke Ono
Antonio is the 39-year-old (37 at the start of the series) ruler of the Republic of Venedik. As a leader, he puts the safety and prosperity of his nation first and foremost. Although sly and opportunistic, Antonio does have a moral compass yet accepts his duties to make pragmatic and painful choices to safeguard Venedik, including not aiding Phoiníkē when Balt-Rhein conquered it and turning his back on his childhood friend, Konstantinos. When finally forced to go to war with Balt-Rhein, Antonio joins the Tripartite Military Alliance with Turkey and the Urado Kingdom and goes to atone for his abandonment of Phoiníkē.
Silvestro Brega (シルヴェストロ・ブレガ, Shiruvesutoro Burega)
Voiced by: Kazuhiro Yamaji
Brega is the 41-year-old (39 at the start of the series) Captain General of the Venedik fleet and the leader of the Brega company. A loyal, no-nonsense man, he acts as Doge Antonio's confidante and envoy in political matters. Having saved a young Abiriga from slavery, Brega and his wife, Cecelia, treat him like a son.
Cecelia Brega (チェチリア・ブレガ, Chechiria Burega)
Voiced by: Fumiko Orikasa
Cecelia is the 37-year-old (35 at the start of the series) wife of Captain Brega and Abiriga's adopted mother. Kind and welcoming, she runs a humble bar and keeps in contact with Abiriga through letters after he leaves Venedik to journey with Mahmut.

==== Phoiníkē ====
Apollodorus (アポロドロス, Aporodorosu)
Voiced by: Atsuki Tani
Apollodorus is the 42-year-old father of Kyros and caesar of Phoiníkē. While Apollodorus contributes much to Phoiníkē as a tradesman, he does so by using flattery or corrupted methods to increase his wealth and power. Due to his weak posture and greedy nature, Kyros and the Phoiníkē senate has a low opinion of Apollodorus, especially when he is willing to heed Balt-Rhien's demands to avoid war. However, after Balt-Rhein defeats Phoiníkē, Apollodorus dies a noble death by taking sole responsibility for the war and appeals for clemency for the other senators and influential citizens by donating all his assets to the empire.
Konstantinos (コンスタンティノス, Konsutantinosu)
Voiced by: Kazuyuki Okitsu
Konstantinos is the 37-year-old Magistros of Phoiníkē and a member of the Senate. He is also a childhood friend of Doge Antonio, as their countries have been long-time allies. Proud of Phoiníkē's long and noble history as an empire, Konstantinos dearly loves his home and holds steadfast to his ideals of it, but this makes him inflexible and unable to handle politics realistically. When Phoiníkē is forced to surrender to Balt-Rhein, Konstantinos takes a final stand against Lelederik before getting killed.
Zenon (ゼノン)
Voiced by: Tanuki Sugino
A 37-year-old (35 at the start of the series) Patrikios, Zenon is a member of the Phoiníkē senate with an excellent ability to measure distance. He is good friends with Konstantinos and Nikephorus, and is the gruffest and most outspoken of the three.
Nikephorus (ニケフォロス, Nikeforosu)
Voiced by: Hiroki Shimowada
A 38-year-old (36 at the start of the series) Patrikios, Nikephorus is a member of the Phoiníkē senate and an excellent mathematician. He is good friends with Konstantinos and Zenon, and is the most realistic and wary of the three.

==== L'isolani ====
A nation located on an island of the eastern Centro Sea ruled by a Doge and a Senate. It has a longtime rivalry with Venedik for the title of strongest maritime nation. When the war between the Empire and the Alliance starts, L'Isolani sides with Balt-Rhein, forming a formidable fleet and heading against Venedik to subjugate it.

Amadeo Boccanegra (アマデオ・ボッカネグラ, Amadeo Bokkanegura)
Amadeo is the 18-year-old (17 at the start of the series) sailor from the Republic of L'isonlani and Captain of the Oro galley ship. Born as the first L'isonlani genius in 100 years, Amadeo possesses the "sight" that allows him to see all the different waves and wind currents around the ocean in explicit detail. As stated by his uncle Gino, Amadeo is conceited and crude, believing that L'isonlani is superior to their rival Venedik. Amadeo and his crew ally with Balt-Rhein in order to rule the Centro sea. During the naval battle against Venedik, Amadeo lost the use of both his eyes, though this did not impaired his ability as a sailor. After Doge Doria's betrayal and the deaths of his two uncles, Amadeo is defeated and promptly hanged to death, putting an end to his prestigious family.
Roni Boccanegra (ロニ・ボッカネグラ, Roni Bokkanegura)
Roni is a 41-year-old (40 at the start of the series) sailor from the Republic of L'isonlani, the first mate to the Oro, and Captain of the Baronessa. He is Gino's older brother and Amadeo's uncle. He respects and dotes on Amadeo, recognizing his genius talents and believes Amadeo and L'isonlani are meant to rule the Centro. After Doge Doria's betrayal and a bitter defeat from Venedik, Roni sacrifices his life trying to save his nephew from a volley of arrows.
Gino Boccanegra (ジーノ・ボッカネグラ, Jīni Bokkanegura)
Gino is the 36-year-old (35 at the start of the series) Captain of the Venedik 15th fleet and the Nero Pantera ship, Roni's younger brother, and Amadeo's uncle. Although once close to his family and a proud L'isonlani citizen, he feels inferior to Amadeo since he doesn't possess the "sight", and comes to dislike L'isonlani's arrogant, isolationist ways. He left his homeland 11 years before the series, putting him on bitter terms with his family, and joined Venedik's naval armada. During the naval battle against the Imperial-L'isonlani fleet, Gino sacrifices his life and the Nero Pantera to save the Venedik flagship.
Doge Donatello Doria (ドナテッロ・ドーリア, Donaterro Dōria)
Voiced by: Yasunori Matsumoto
Doria is the 41-year-old (39 at the start of the series) ruler of Republic of L'isonlani and captain of the Arlecchino. Two-faced and tricky, Doria initially joins Amadeo and his family in allying with Balt-Rhein in order to get rid of Venedik, despite the Doria and Boccanegra families' long-time rivalry for the position of Doge. After receiving a letter from Doge Antonio on how they will defeat the Imperial-L'isonlani fleet, Doria betrays Amadeo and his crew, and helps Venedik defeat them.

==== Chielo ====
Carvajal (カルバハル, Karubaharu)
Voiced by: Daisuke Hirakawa
Carvajal is the 29-year-old (28 at the start of the series) director of welfare institutionalization for the Republic of Chielo. Optimistic and magnanimous, Carvajal strongly believes in helping others to find a "Final Feliz" (happy ending). On his authority, Chielo joins the Anti-Imperial Alliance and Carvajal chooses to let thousands of refugees in Chielo, despite the impact on their provisions. After suffering a two-month siege by Balt-Rhein and with supplies running low, Carvajal is imprisoned by a group of dissenters that wants to surrender to the empire. Carvajal is eventually executed by the Chielo rebels, but not before declaring that he holds no ill will towards them. Once Chielo becomes a vassal state of the Turkey stratocracy, an Imaret is named in Carvajal's honor.
Cassandra (カサンドラ, Sasandora)
Voiced by: Shizuka Itou
Cassandra is the 27-year-old (25 at the start of the series) secretary of Republic of Chielo and Carvajal's right-hand woman. Like all Chielo citizens, her family is descended from wartime refugees, specifically her grandfather. She and Carvajal share a close companionship, sharing his "Final Feliz" belief and giving aid to the poor, and his death devastated her. Once Chielo becomes a vassal state of the Turkey stratocracy, Cassandra is appointed Kâhya Başi and helps the Turks run the republic.

=== Cuore di Rumeliana and South Rumeliana ===
Cuore di Rumeliana, or simply the "Cuore", is a region made of thirty-four small, independent republics with agricultural societies. Each republic is ruled by a Gonfaloniere, chosen in an annual democratic vote. It is the political, economical, and cultural center of West Rumeliana since it is where the Phoiníkē Empire began 3,000 years ago. Locals still take pride in the history as the "heart" of Rumeliana and value the arts above all else, with the Republic of Florence being the center and the most influential republic of the Cuore. The Cuore republics have no formal national military, but they are able to enjoy a period of long-term peace due to having their spies gather information on surroundings nations to keep them in line.

South Rumeliana is more rustic than the Cuore and the form of government varies among the independent city-states, though most are republics and are ruled by an Estado, a head-of-state. Both the Cuore and the South have an abundance of mercenaries, since the Cuore and the South both hire mercenaries for national defense and South Rumeliana is home to the mercenary city, Tauro, and the El Toro mercenaries.

Caterina di Rossi (カテリーナ・デ・ロッシ, Katerīna Rosshi)
Voiced by: Mamiko Noto
Caterina is the 33-year-old (31 at the start of the series) Gonfaloniere of the Republic of Florence, who has been elected consecutively for three years and is a member of the noble Rossi family. She is Süleyman's former lover during his stay in Florence and is still fond of him. However, she does share some of the Cuore's anti-Turkey sentiments and can be difficult to negotiate with, but is willing to be flexible for the sake of her country.
Giovanni di Orsani (ジョバンニ・デ・オルシーニ公爵, Jobanni de Orushīni Kōshaku)
Giovanni is a former Gonfaloniere, a member of the noble Orsani family, and Süleyman's former master. Happy-go-lucky and friendly, he and Süleyman share a close bond, and he is always willing to help his former student. Giovanni is well-respected as a former Gonfaloniere and Süleyman often uses his connection to Giovanni to gain entrance to higher-class places, though his influence is limited since Süleyman left his service after he heard of the Tuğril tribe's destruction.
Brigitta Grimaldi (ブリジッタ・グリマルディ, Burijitta Gurimarudi)
Voiced by: Aoi Yūki
Brigitta is the 18-year-old (16 at the start of the series) leader of the Lince mercenaries, a Cuore-based mercenary group. She inherited the role of leader from her father, who was the previous leader. She is currently employed by the Cuore Alliance and seems to be familiar with the El Toro mercenaries. Like most people of the Cuore, she sees the Turks as "barbaric", but likes Kurt Kurt Pasha after he generously gives Lince the spoils for their help in battle.
Derecho (デルッチョ, Derutcho) and Esquerdo (エスケルド, Esukerudo)
Voiced by: Tsuyoshi Koyama (both)
Older brother Derecho and younger brother Esquerdo are the 57-year-old (55 at the start of the series) boisterous and unruly twin mayors of Tauro city. Being mercenaries, the twins have many battle scars and lost limbs. Derecho lost his right eye and his legs has been amputated above the knee and Esquerdo's arms have been amputated past his forearms. Esquerdo wears hook arms prosthetic and Derecho uses a wheelchair to get around, only wearing prosthetic legs when in battle. While initially dismissive of Mahmut, the twins warm up to him after he demonstrates his strength and even quickly befriends Halil. After Mahmut and the Turkey stratocracy hire all the Tauro city-based mercenaries, the twins assist the Turks in their fight against Balt-Rhein.
Erbach (エルバッハ, Erubahha)
Voiced by: Hiro Shimono
Erbach is the 24-year-old (22 at the start of the series) captain of the El Toro mercenaries and currently under the employment of the Turkey stratocracy. Although he gives off a carefree and lazy demeanor, he has a cynical side and often makes sardonic remarks. Erbach greatly enjoys battle and is more politically aware than the rest of the mercenaries. Erbach initially thinks Mahmut was unsuited of the battlefield, but grows to respect him once he proves otherwise and helps him navigate South Rumeliana and its culture. Before living in Tauro, Erbach hailed from former Balt-Rhein territory.
Vasco (バスコ, Basuko)
Voiced by: Kazutomi Yamamoto
Vasco is a 16-year-old (14 at the start of the series) citizen from Campana, a city in South Rumeliana, and a worker at the city's metal foundry. Vasco is an intelligent and innovative inventor, creating a Dardanelles Gun-style cannon for the first time in the series. When Balt-Rhein invaded the city, Vasco is able to escape the slaughter with his cannon blueprints. Although a kind boy, Campana's destruction fills Vasco with anger and grief, and he vows to avenge his people. Traveling to the Turkey stratocracy, Vasco gains Zağanos's patronage and Beyazit's help to manufacture cannons for the Anti-Imperial Alliance. Later, he joins Zağanos's Imperial Invasion army to witness his cannons bring down the empire.
Blanca (ブランカ, Buranka)
Voiced by: Yō Taichi
Blanca is a 21-year-old (19 at the start of the series) citizen from Campana and the spy for Zağanos's spy network who is stationed in the city. After Campana's destruction, Blanca travels to the Turkey stratocracy and provides help to refugees from other cities on the way. After meeting Vasco, she takes him to Turkey to meet with Zağanos and continues to perform tasks on Zağanos's behalf.

=== Urado Kingdom ===
The Urado Kingdom is located in the most northern region of West Rumeliana and is made of rocky mountains and plateaus. Urado has a severe isolationist and neutrality policy. Due to the rocky terrain, cold climate, and few resources, Urado is a poverty-stricken country and many of its citizens die from starvation or the cold. However, Urado has a strong lancer regiment and keeps up-to-date with outside affairs due to cabinet ministers being assigned to different nations in order to gather information. By the time Mahmut arrives at Urado, the country's lifespan has been exhausted, but Mahmut discovers that it has an abundance of fossilized bird feces, which makes good fertilizer, on a coastline. He convinces Urado's king to begin to trade fertilizer with eastern Rumeliana countries to revitalize the country and forego their isolationist policy for the first time.

King Zsigmond III (ジグモンド3世, Jigumondo Sansei)
Voiced by: Sho Hayami
Zsigmond is the 44-year-old (42 at the start of the series) ruler of Urado and father of the four Urado princesses. Strict and stoic, Zsigmond tries his best to follow Urado's isolationist traditions, despite the fact that Urado has grown incredibly impoverished during his reign. Recognizing the kingdom's dire situation and weakened state, he nearly makes a treaty with Balt-Rhein to attain resources to save his people. However, Mahmut persuades him to ally with Turkey and enters the Tripartite Military Alliance. Although polite and honorable, he shows a rather ferocious side, such as executing a Balt-Rhein ambassador as a show of trust to Turkey.
Margit (マルギット, Marugitto)
Voiced by: Megumi Han
Margit is the 22-year-old (20 at the start of the series) fourth princess of the Urado kingdom and the cabinet minister of negotiations for Greater Turkey. She is also a spy for Zağanos's spy network, which her father is aware of and allows since cabinet ministers are free to use any method to gather information. Although preppy and energetic, Margit takes her duties seriously and is the most willing among her family to ally with Turkey, knowing Balt-Rhein will make Urado dependent on them. Once Urado starts to do trade with east Rumeliana, Margit is reassigned as the cabinet minister for the eastern countries and journeys with Niki to the east.
Gertrud (ゲルトルード, Gerutorūdo)
Voiced by: Juri Kimura
Gertrud is the 26-year-old (24 at the start of the series) second princess of the Urado kingdom and the cabinet minister for Balt-Rhein. Knowing Balt-Rhein is the biggest military power, Gertrud initially argues against her sister on becoming Turkey's ally out of fear, but Mahmut puts her worries to rest when he is able to convince Zsigmond to ally with Turkey while maintaining Urado's independence. Once Urado enters the Tripartite Military Alliance and Anti-Imperial Alliance by extension, Gertrud is reassigned as the cabinet minister for the Cuore and South Rumeliana, and handles any negotiations in the area for her father.

=== Argyros ===
Located on the border of East Rumeliana that faces West Rumeliana, Argyros is a commercial city-state and the eastern trading hub of the continent. The city is ruled by a council of the "Three Great Merchants", who are charged with directing the trade routes. They are also the ones that can grant merchants permission to trade in Argyros, thus becoming a "Gosti" and give them a "Zuakk" amulet as proof of their approval. To keep Argyros a safe and free place to trade without outside customs interfering, there is a merchant code that doesn't allow merchants to get involved with any political parties and the council can exile anyone from the city found in violation of the laws.

Niki Al-Bahram (ニキ・アル・バフラーム, Niki Aru Bafurāmu)
Voiced by: Ryoko Shiraishi
Niki is a 16-year-old (14 at the start of the series) Gosti merchant and the only child of the deceased Gosti Bahram. She grew up helping her father's caravan since childhood and is knowledgeable about trading customs and laws. At fifteen, Niki recently lost her father and inherited his Zuakk, though she has trouble starting her own caravan due to her youth and lack of any individual success. With the help of Mahmut, Niki quickly becomes successful and now does business with Turkey's support. Although she broke Argyros laws, the council allows Niki to keep her Gosti status so Balt-Rhein will not target Argyros for Niki's assistance in subtly manipulating the empire's economy. Despite her age and small stature, Niki is very strong and tomboyish, remaining steadfast and loyal to Mahmut in spite of the potential dangers. Having known Wan Yixin since childhood, Niki is a skilled combatant and fights with tonfa.
Wan Yixin (ワン・イーシン, Wan Īshin)
Voiced by: Hiroshi Naka
Wan Yixin is an 80-year-old (79 at the start of the series) native from Çinili, a country in East Rumeliana, who currently resides in Argyros to purchase rare items for the Emperor of Çinili. He was once captain of the royal guards, but retired after losing part of his right leg in battle and wears a wooden prosthetic in its place. Using his connection to the Emperor, Mahmut asks Wan to help him manipulate Venedik and Balt-Rhein's economical interests, promising that the business transaction will protect Çinili from the empire's expansion war. Wan agrees and accepts the consequences of the council banning from him trading with Niki's caravan ever again. Being a close friend to her father, Wan and his wife greatly care for Niki, the former being the one that taught Niki how to fight, and does his best to help her.

=== Araba Tribe ===
A large population of nomadic people scattered in smaller groups all around West Rumeliana, though they are primarily located in the Balt-Rhein Empire's territory. The entire population dreams of having their own independent country and is manipulated by Louis into causing the Hisar Rebellion to make the Hisar village their own city-state. When they realized that the empire was using them to invade Turkey, the members of the Araba Tribe help Greater Turkey in their war efforts against the empire, such as passing on information or smuggling weapons to assist with a revolt. The Araba Tribe are a peaceful people who are talented dancers and performers. The tribe has no written language and follows an oral tradition; therefore, all Araba Tribe members possess excellent memory. One member, Nigrina, a young man from a group in the empire's territory, helps Süleyman with his espionage once Turkey plans to invade Balt-Rhein.
