= Legasista =

2012 action role-playing game

- Japanese box art
- Developer: System Prisma
- Publisher: Nippon Ichi Software
- Platforms: PlayStation 3, PlayStation Network
- Release: PlayStation 3: JP: 15 March 2012; PlayStation Network: JP: 28 June 2012; NA: 21 August 2012; EU: 22 August 2012
- Genres: Dungeon crawling, Action role-playing game
- Mode: Single-player

Legasista, known in Japan as Meikyū Tōro Legasista (迷宮塔路 レガシスタ, Meikyū Tōro Regashisuta), is a PlayStation 3 game published by Nippon Ichi Software. It was released in Japan on disc in March 2012 then in North America and Europe exclusively as a downloadable game through the PlayStation Network in August 2012. It is a dungeon crawling action role-playing game. For the game's North American and European releases, it was not dubbed, spoken dialog remaining in the original Japanese.

== Plot ==
The game is set in a world where technology is largely forgotten. Alto, the protagonist of the game, enters the Ivy Tower in order to find an ancient weapon capable of breaking a curse on his sister. Although he finds the weapon, it is in the form of a young girl named Melize, and thus Alto must now explore the dungeons inside the tower in order for her to remember how to bring his sister back to normal.

== Gameplay ==
Legasista is a Japanese dungeon crawling role-playing game featuring an art style based on sprites. Players assume a customizable team of three characters. The game features job classes and equipment can be changed to the player's liking when the player reaches a certain level, and the characters' personalities can also be changed, along with how they fight. The game features randomly generated dungeons and thus has long replay value.

The game takes place in dungeons within the Ivy Tower, and are filled with monsters. Players attempt to clear a floor of the dungeon and move on to the next. The monsters normally try to kill the player; the player's weapons to combat them include a sword, a bow and arrow, magic, amongst other weapons and skills. More damage is done if the player hits the monster from behind. There are also traps laid in the dungeons which not only hurt the player but also the enemies themselves.

== Reception ==
Reception

Aggregate score
Aggregator	Score
Metacritic	68/100

Review scores
Publication	Score
Famitsu	29/40
GameSpot	7/10
GamesRadar+	3.5/5
GameZone	6.5/10
Hardcore Gamer	3.5/5
IGN	6.5/10
PlayStation: The Official Magazine	7/10
RPGFan	70%
VentureBeat	45/100
411Mania	7.8/10

The game received "average" reviews according to the review aggregation website Metacritic. IGN said the game was targeted towards gamers who enjoy "grinding" to the detriment of everyone else. GamesRadar+ said, "While seemingly geared towards a niche audience of players that enjoy anime-styled protagonists and fanciful storylines, Legasista provides enough varied elements to create a welcoming experience for anyone to enjoy." However, VentureBeat gave the game a negative review, claiming it to be repetitive and boring, and summing it up as an "uninspired mess". The soundtrack, however, was praised. In Japan, Famitsu gave it a score of three sevens and one eight for a total of 29 out of 40.
