= List of Saekano episodes =

Cover of the third home video release volume featuring Megumi Kato.

Saekano: How to Raise a Boring Girlfriend (Japanese: 冴えない彼女(ヒロイン)の育てかた, Hepburn: Saenai Hiroin no Sodatekata) is an anime television series produced by A-1 Pictures, and based on the light novel series of the same name written by Fumiaki Maruto and illustrated by Kurehito Misaki. The anime adaptation is directed by Kanta Kamei and written by Maruto, featuring character designs by Tomoaki Takase and music by Hajime Hyakkoku. The first season aired from January 9 to March 27, 2015. The second season titled, Saekano: How to Raise a Boring Girlfriend Flat, aired from April 14 to June 23, 2017, with a web-only "episode 0" released on April 6, 2017.

For the first season, the opening theme song is "Kimiiro Signal" (君色シグナル, Kimiiro Shigunaru) by Luna Haruna, while the ending theme song is "Colorful." (カラフル。, Karafuru.) by Miku Sawai. It has been licensed in North America by Aniplex of America, and in Australia and New Zealand by Madman Entertainment. For the second season, the opening theme song is "Stella Breeze" (ステラブリーズ, Sutera Burīzu) by Luna Haruna, while the ending theme song is "Pink Diary" (桜色ダイアリー, Sakurairo Daiarī) for episode 0 to 10 and "Youth Prologue" (青春プロローグ, Seishun Prologue) for episode 11, both sung by Moso Calibration. The second season was exclusively streamed on Amazon Prime Video.

== Episode list ==
=== Season 1 (2015) ===
No. in series	No. in season	Title (Note: All English titles are taken from Crunchyroll.)	Directed by	Original air date
1	0	"Fan Service of Love and Youth"; Transliteration: "Ai to Seishun no Sābisu Kai" (Japanese: 愛と青春のサービス回)	Kanta Kamei	January 9, 2015
Tomoya Aki, Megumi Kato, Eriri Spencer Sawamura, Utaha Kasumigaoka, and Tomoya's cousin Michiru Hyodo (all members of a dōjin circle called Blessing Software) go out location scouting for their project, a video game. As Eriri attempts to get Megumi to act out a scenario for the main heroine, Utaha lures Tomoya away and forces him to act out a romantic scenario with her. However, her efforts are interrupted by a jealous Eriri, and as the two girls argue, Michiru accompanies Tomoya near the lake, but wind up in an awkward position before they are interrupted by Megumi. Later on, the group plays ping-pong at the inn. That night, Eriri, Utaha, and Michiru confront Tomoya, and demand to know why he forced them to join the club and makes them do unreasonable tasks without repaying them. After being saved by Megumi, he talks with her about her tendency to not stand out in the group. The two express their hopes that their game will be enjoyed by the otaku community.
2	1	"An Error-ridden Prologue"; Transliteration: "Machigaidarake no Purorōgu" (Japanese: 間違いだらけのプロローグ)	Yūki Ogawa	January 16, 2015
Six months before the scouting trip, Tomoya meets Megumi after he retrieves her lost beret, which inspires him to begin development on a video game with her as the main heroine. A week later at school, he meets up with his friend Yoshihiko Kamigo, who tells him about Eriri, a well-known member of the school's art club who Yoshihiko has a crush on. Unable to recreate Megumi's exact image, Tomoya asks Eriri to help him create the art for the dating sim, since she is also a popular dōjinshi writer and illustrator. Believing Tomoya is not taking the subject too seriously because he cannot even remember Megumi, Eriri declines the offer. During lunch, Tomoya approaches Utaha and asks for her assistance, as she is an increasingly popular novelist, but she declines the offer after noticing an absence of originality in his proposal. After school, Tomoya expands his proposal and goes to the AV room, where he promised a meeting between him, Eriri, and Utaha. On the way there, he encounters Megumi, but he does not recognize her until she reminds him about how he returned her beret. Eriri and Utaha meet up at the AV room, where they both engage in a bitter rivalry before realizing Tomoya is not going to show up.
3	2	"A Girlfriend Without a Raised Flag"; Transliteration: "Furagu no Tatanai Kanojo" (Japanese: フラグの立たない彼女)	Akihisa Shibata	January 23, 2015
Eventually, Eriri and Utaha decide to accept Tomoya's proposal to create the video game. Tomoya then has dinner with Megumi at a coffee shop, where he notices that despite her cuteness, she has a lack of presence. When they talk about how coincidental their first meeting was, Megumi refers to herself as "boring". At first, Tomoya is enraged at her statement, but realizes that she is right since she has no traits that would make her stick out of a crowd. The two are then joined by Eriri and Utaha, both of whom take a look at Tomoya's expanded proposal and continue to express their disapproval of it. They encourage him to give up on the project, but he refuses. The next day, he invites Megumi over to his house, where he has her play a dating sim game in the hopes that she would understand the subject material. When she finishes the game, Megumi is pleased by the experience, but she misunderstands the actual appeal of it. Tomoya is forced to have her stay the night and play the game's sequel, which she agrees to do, much to his shock. By the time she finishes playing, morning has arrived, and in her drowsiness, she agrees to join Tomoya's circle.
4	3	"Retake the Climax"; Transliteration: "Kuraimakkusu wa Riteiku de" (Japanese: クライマックスはリテイクで)	Hidetoshi Takahashi	January 30, 2015
With Eriri and Utaha continuing to turn down his revised drafts for the project, Tomoya is faced with a final deadline at the end of Golden Week. He tries inviting Megumi over to his house again, but finds that she is out of town on a family vacation that will last until the end of the holiday. Eriri and Utaha arrive separately at the house, with Eriri subtly motivating Tomoya and Utaha encouraging him to give up and that being a creator has its cons. Later, Tomoya calls Megumi again and allows her to have fun on her vacation. She asks him about how she was appealing to him, and he responds there is no room for improvement for her. Tomoya tries continuing with his project, but is unable to make any progress and he contemplates giving up. Suddenly, Megumi arrives, dressed in the same attire she wore when they first met and exhibiting a new personality, and asks if this was what he envisioned of his heroine. When Tomoya is puzzled by her change in personality, she tells him that Eriri and Utaha helped her before encouraging him to continue on with the project. Eriri and Utaha watch the scenario unfold, and admit that they will be involved in the project, even if Tomoya cannot finish by the deadline.
5	4	"Budget, Deadline and New Development"; Transliteration: "Yosan to Nōki to Shin Tenkai" (Japanese: 予算と納期と新展開)	Ippei Yokota	February 6, 2015
Megumi is impressed after she finishes reading a light novel series written by Utaha. Meanwhile, hoping to learn more about Utaha's new book ahead of the rest of the public, Tomoya has a job interview with her and gets a job as a part-time editor, much to her displeasure. It is revealed that Utaha's series gained its popularity due to Tomoya featuring it on his well-known blog site. He spends much of the day writing an interview article, after which Utaha offers her assistance on his project proposal, surprising him. Later on, Eriri decides to join in on the project as well. During a meeting between Tomoya, Eriri, and Utaha in the AV room, Tomoya announces the production schedule and declares the release date to be during the Winter Comiket. However, because of the funding necessitated to further the project, Tomoya is forced to work a number of odd jobs. While working one of them, he discovers Megumi accompanying her cousin, Keiichi. He chastises her for straying from the heroine formula and tells her not to see Keiichi for the time being. When Megumi tells Tomoya that she plans to go shopping with Keiichi, Tomoya invites Megumi to go on a date.
6	5	"The Date Event of Crossing Paths"; Transliteration: "Surechigai no Dētoibento" (Japanese: すれ違いのデートイベント)	Jin Iwatsuki	February 13, 2015
The circle activities begin, and Eriri experiences a difficulty in getting Megumi to display exaggerated emotions for inspiration for her sketches. When Megumi leaves to practice her expressions, Tomoya and Eriri talk about how emotionless she is and the challenge it presents for the game. Tomoya asks Eriri on dating advice, as he and Megumi planned to go shopping the following weekend. At first, she gives it to him, but realizes his intentions and becomes enraged. Utaha overhears the conversation and is further inspired to write the game's plot. The next day, she finishes, and while Tomoya is impressed by the final result, he asks for a better conclusion, which upsets Eriri, as she wants to finish development as soon as possible. As Tomoya and Megumi spend the day at the mall, he becomes increasingly uncomfortable about interacting with what he views as regular people. Upon reaching the last store, Tomoya receives a gift box of glasses from Megumi.
7	6	"Deciding the Night for Two"; Transliteration: "Futari no Yoru no Sentakushi" (Japanese: 二人の夜の選択肢)	Takahiro Kawakoshi	February 20, 2015
In a flashback, Utaha meets Tomoya personally for the first time during a book signing. She becomes impressed with his knowledge of her books and eventually is enamored with him. In the present day, Tomoya misses their scheduled meeting, which upsets Utaha. She recalls the incident six months ago, during which she gave Tomoya an advanced copy of her final manuscript before its release, only for him to turn the responsibility down because she was only doing it to hear his feedback and not those of other fans. Later on, as a rainstorm approaches, she is surprised to see Tomoya running up to her in the rain. While allowing Tomoya to take a hot bath in a hotel room, Utaha is shocked after realizing her manager ordered the room for the both of them for the night. After taking a shower alone, Utaha has a conversation with Tomoya, who asks her for help in improving the game's plot. At first, she is upset by this, but changes her mind after he suggests keeping both storylines as game routes. After spending the entire night working out the plot, Utaha leaves the room after acknowledging Tomoya as a creator. The day before, Megumi and Eriri meet up at the mall, after Tomoya leaves so that Eriri could draw a quick sketch. Eriri is pleased with her drawing, having unexpectedly upset Megumi when she reminded her that Tomoya abruptly ended their date to follow Utaha.
8	7	"Friend, Foe or a New Character"; Transliteration: "Teki ka Mikata ka Shin Kyara ka" (Japanese: 敵か味方か新キャラか)	Yoshinobu Tokumoto	February 27, 2015
With the deadline for the manuscript of their dōjin circle drawing near, Eriri invites Tomoya to her house. There, she comes up with an idea how to push her creativity to the limits and the two engage in a role-play scenario. Thanks to their efforts, Eriri's work nears completion. At the school gate, Tomoya realizes Megumi changed her hairstyle, and he presses her for an explanation. Meanwhile, he meets Izumi, who is a childhood friend, an otaku, and a member of the dōjin circle Fancy Wave. Tomoya reminisces with Izumi, who gives him a ticket to the Comiket and tells him that she wants him to come to her dōjin circle. Additionally, she reveals to Tomoya that everything she has now is thanks to him. As Tomoya and Eriri walk home, they reunite with their old friend, Iori, who is the representative of the dōjin circle Rouge en rouge. Iori is looking for an illustrator, so he announces a challenge to Tomoya, in which both must prove whether they are the most qualified person to use Eriri as their group's illustrator.
9	8	"A Wingman's Traumatic Recollection Mode"; Transliteration: "Ateuma Torauma Kaisō Mōdo" (Japanese: 当て馬トラウマ回想モード)	Jun Soga	March 6, 2015
In Tomoya's room, while Eriri silently writes a manuscript, Tomoya and Eriri argue over some minor things regarding the deadline for submitting it. Afterwards, Megumi and Tomoya play video games, during which he praises her, saying that she has become a fine otaku. He asks whether Eriri will join Rouge en rouge, but she tells him that she has decided to become his illustrator. On the day of the Summer Comiket, Megumi is bewildered by the large crowd, but, by following Tomoya, she manages to arrive at the dōjin circle where Izumi is, and the two help with Izumi's circle activity. When Izumi talks about the Comiket, Tomoya is impressed with the quality of her works, since it has only been a year since she started. Tomoya concocts a plan and when Izumi talks with Megumi, he starts carrying it out. Thanks to Tomoya's cooperation, Izumi's dōjin circle has an increase in its sales and is extremely well received, which makes a positive impression on Izumi. When the Comiket ends and Tomoya leaves, he meets Eriri, who has Izumi's circle's book. She tells Tomoya with teary eyes that she is no longer loved by him, and she leaves him.
10	9	"One-on-one Route After 8 Years"; Transliteration: "Hachi-nen-buri no Kobetsu Rūto" (Japanese: 八年ぶりの個別ルート)	Yūki Ogawa	March 13, 2015
Tomoya abruptly wakes in his bed and notices that there is a woman sleeping alongside him. He realizes that it is Utaha, who was invited to his house by Megumi. When the three of them discuss why Eriri got angry, Utaha tells Tomoya that Eriri has lost her pride as a creator and that she subsequently lost her footing as Tomoya's childhood friend. She provides him with advice on how to reconcile with Eriri. Afterwards, Tomoya goes to the Comiket, where he meets Iori and asks him to help him get Eriri back to his circle. At night, against the dark sky, lit with fireworks that erupt over Eriri's house, Tomoya appears in her garden and cries out to her in accordance with Utaha's plan, and then takes her to the elementary school they used to attend. Eriri begins to cry and tells Tomoya that she is not as important to him as Izumi, who got to know him recently. He reveals to Eriri that he had blamed her for breaking off contact with him and making new friends. Afterwards, Eriri pledges to become Tomoya's "number one", and he escorts her back home. In Tomoya's room, Eriri makes a new "circle cut" and delivers it to the circle's members.
11	10	"A Melody of Reminiscing and Support"; Transliteration: "Omoide to Tekoire no Merodi" (Japanese: 思い出とテコ入れのメロディ)	Daisuke Takashima	March 20, 2015
Tomoya, Eriri, Utaha, and Megumi hold a video conference in regards to producing a game, and afterwards, Tomoya heads off to take a bath. On his way there, he bumps into a girl and realizes she is his cousin, Michiru. Michiru tells Tomoya that she ran away from home after a fight with her father over her membership in a band. After school, in the club room, Tomoya is contacted by Michiru, after which Utaha attacks him with questions about his relationship with Michiru. Tomoya goes home and is shocked to discover his otaku goods dumped in the waste by Michiru. He confronts her about it, but she orders him to cease acting like an otaku and to think about his future. After the two talk about her band activity and his otaku activities, Tomoya gets in the bath, and while he is bathing, he hears Michiru playing music. Her music touches Tomoya's heart, invoking mental imagery of a cut scene from a game. Afterwards, he decides to introduce Michiru to his game circle.
12	11	"Ready to Start Resolving the Subplots"; Transliteration: "Fukusen Kaishū Junbi Yoshi" (Japanese: 伏線回収準備よし)	Takahiro Kawakoshi	March 27, 2015
Tomoya introduces Michiru to the girls, stating that he wants Michiru to do the background music for the game. Michiru, however, voices her dislike of anything otaku-related. Utaha and Michiru argue over the difference in their views, while Eriri is traumatized because her childhood friend status has been overshadowed by Michiru, who has known Tomoya her whole life. Tomoya tries to persuade Michiru, but she wants to focus on her band and find a manager in order to win her father's approval. Michiru wants Tomoya to be her band manager, using it as an excuse to make him quit his otaku lifestyle, as well as stating that the other girls are not as passionate in game-making as he is. Meanwhile, Megumi helps Eriri and Utaha to work on the game because they are one week behind schedule. Megumi later shows Tomoya the changes she made, and also, in revenge for his overreaction to her relationship with her cousin Keiichi, teases Tomoya's close relationship with Michiru. They both agree on the effect Michiru's music brings to the game. Tomoya agrees to be Michiru's band manager, setting up a first live show for the band in the process.
13	12	"The Ups and Downs at the End of Each Day"; Transliteration: "Haran to Gekidō no Nichijō Endo" (Japanese: 波乱と激動の日常エンド)	Kanta Kamei	March 27, 2015
Tomoya briefs Michiru's band, Icy Tail on their first gig, stating that they are warming up for other bands since they do not have a fanbase yet. Meanwhile, Utaha and Eriri accompany Megumi to offer support for Michiru's band, despite being upset that Tomoya became the band manager without consulting them first. They arrive seeing Michiru and Tomoya in a provocative position while she questions him over their outfits. Tomoya explains that Icy Tail has always been playing covers of anime songs, revealing the fact that the other members of the band are actually otakus. He convinces Michiru to join his circle, with the approval of her band-mates. Icy Tail's debut is well received, with Michiru performing her own original song at the end. Meanwhile, Eriri and Megumi become close friends, and Utaha finishes writing the first route of the game's scenario. Tomoya and the girls take a look at the completed first route in his room, and continue to work on the other routes with two months left until the Winter Comiket.

=== Season 2: Flat (2017) ===
No. in series	No. in season	Title	Directed by	Original air date
14	0	"Fan Service of Love and Pure Heart"; Transliteration: "Koi to Junjō no Sābisu Kai" (Japanese: 恋と純情のサービス回)	Shige Fukase	April 6, 2017 (web only)
Tomoya and the girls spend the night at the hotel.
15	1	"Way of Two Boring Rivals's Encounter"; Transliteration: "Saenai Ryūko no Aimie Kata" (Japanese: 冴えない竜虎の相見えかた)	Akihisa Shibata	April 14, 2017
With Eriri displeased with the changes Utaha made to the script (requiring extra work), the two recall the time they first met one year ago. Utaha visits the library to confirm that it is carrying the light novel she wrote. She leaves and gets stopped along the way by Eriri, as both girls figure out that they are the authors of their respective works. Utaha had gotten close to Tomoya, provoking a jealous reaction from Eriri, leading the latter to draw for the sake of revenge. After talking things out, the two get along. Back in the present day, Utaha and Eriri decide to take a break from work, while Tomoya announces big plans for Comiket, with the two girls doing a sketch for each other.
16	2	"Turning Point of Earnest and Real"; Transliteration: "Honki de Hontō na Bunki Ten" (Japanese: 本気で本当な分岐)	Noriko Hashimoto	April 21, 2017
Utaha completes the script for the game, and she goes out with Tomoya to Ikebukuro to celebrate. She asks him for his opinion on which college to go to: a college in the Kansai region with a highly prestigious novelist program or a local college. Tomoya is presented with a decision as to which script Utaha wrote to use for his game between one that fits in with the current tone of the game, or one that leads to a deeper story, but requires lots of additional work for Eriri due to the changes in the tone. As the game's director, Utaha lets Tomoya know she is fine either way.
17	3	"First Draft, Second Draft and Great Long Thinking"; Transliteration: "Shokō to Nikō to Daichōkō" (Japanese: 初稿と二稿と大長考)	Takahiro Kawakoshi	April 28, 2017
Tomoya and Eriri meet up with Izumi and is surprised to also see Iori there. Iori tells Tomoya and Eriri that he will be making a game in the same genre, and that Izumi will be doing the art. Izumi and Eriri then get into a fight, thinking that their game will end up being better. Afterwards, Megumi, Michiru, and her bandmates visit Tomoya to discuss the direction of the game. Tomoya lets Utaha know that neither script that she wrote is acceptable for the game in its current form.
18	4	"New Route of Two Nights and Three Days"; Transliteration: "Ni Haku San Nichi no Shinrūto" (Japanese: 二泊三日の新ルート)	Yūsuke Maruyama	May 5, 2017
Tomoya points out that the script needs to be condensed as the game reads too much like a novel with the script Utaha wrote. Utaha decides to spend the weekend at Tomoya's house during the school's culture festival to work on the script. In the end, an additional route is added, despite being significantly behind schedule.
19	5	"Deadline or Awakening"; Transliteration: "Shimekiri ga saki ka, kakusei ga saki ka" (Japanese: 締め切りが先か、覚醒が先か)	Kazuki Ōhashi	May 12, 2017
With only a week left before the deadline, Eriri decides to spend the week at her family's villa in the Nasu Highland as she is well behind schedule due to the last minute changes Tomoya made. Utaha points out the quality is not a reflection of the time she is putting in, but Tomoya still trusts that Eriri will deliver. Eriri initially struggles, but then she changes her approach by drawing the characters and backgrounds together rather than separately as is usually done. One day before the deadline, she completes the artwork.
20	6	"The Deadline Buried in Snow"; Transliteration: "Yuki ni umoreta masutāappu" (Japanese: 雪に埋もれたマスターアップ)	Hideaki Ōnishi	May 19, 2017
Shortly after completing the artwork, Eriri collapses and catches a fever due to overexertion. Tomoya heads to the villa with Iori, and makes a decision to take care of Eriri or get the game completed before the deadline. Tomoya decides to take care of Eriri and because he missed the deadline, the game has to be sold on DVDs burned at home for Comiket leading to an easy win for Rouge en Rouge. However, the game sells out and receives rave reviews on social media. During the event, Akane Kosaka drops by.
21	7	"The New Plan of Revenge"; Transliteration: "Ribenji-mamire no shin kikaku" (Japanese: リベンジまみれの新企画)	Michiru Itabisashi	May 26, 2017
The game "Cherry Blessing" gets rave reviews due to Utaha's script and Eriri's artwork leading to a large amount of additional orders. However, the extra route that Tomoya wrote gets mixed reviews. Just before Valentine's Day, Tomoya receives chocolates from his circle, as well as Izumi through Iori, with the latter telling him to keep the circle, going unable to claim victory at Winter Comiket. Tomoya individually meets Eriri and Utaha and while he has their well-being in mind with Eriri getting sick for his sake and Utaha writing a novel she needs to complete before she begins college, they tell him that they want to work on his next project. Tomoya observes Megumi and realizes that she has become distant from him. Tomoya puts together the proposal for the next project for Summer Comiket titled "How to Raise a Boring Girlfriend".
22	8	"The Girl Who Didn't Break the Flag"; Transliteration: "Furagu o oranakatta kanojo" (Japanese: フラグを折らなかった彼女)	Akihisa Shibata	June 2, 2017
While replaying "Cherry Blessing", Tomoya realizes how important Megumi was to the game. At school, Tomoya brings Megumi to the AV room to have a private chat, as well as to show her the proposal of his next project letting her know that "Cherry Blessing" got away from his circle's core values. He vows to have the next game stay true to his values. He explains the responsibilities as Megumi is his assistant, while Eriri will continue with the artwork when she recovers from her slump and Utaha will only write the main route so that it does not get in the way of her college education. Megumi spends the night at Tomoya's house to discuss the project, and reaffirms her commitment to the project while pointing out that she dislikes the name of the game.
23	9	"Graduation with a Twist"; Transliteration: "Sotsugyōshiki to chō tenkai" (Japanese: 卒業式と超展開)	Shige Fukase	June 9, 2017
Utaha graduates from high school and following the ceremony, she and Tomoya sit down to discuss the proposal for his next project. While Utaha expresses her desire to work with the circle again, she tells Tomoya that she does not participate in a reduced capacity. She points out Tomoya's biggest shortcoming as a project manager putting too much emphasis on the well-being of his colleagues rather than the project. Utaha shows the proposal for the game Field Chronicles XIII she received from Akane a month ago and lets him know that Eriri was heavily recruited for the project. Utaha tells the story about the game as Akane was impressed by Utaha writing and Eriri's artwork after playing "Cherry Blossom" prompting her to aggressively recruit those two. Utaha and Eriri met up with Akane about the proposal with Eriri telling Akane that she is in a slump and unable to devote her time to the project for the next year. However, Akane responds with harsh criticism and insults her by showing sketches she made that imitate Eriri's artwork that she collected during her secret visit to her family's villa, causing Eriri to snap.
24	10	"And the Rivals Will Challenge God"; Transliteration: "Soshite ryūko wa kami ni idoman" (Japanese: そして竜虎は神に挑まん)	Kazuki Ōhashi	June 16, 2017
After the meeting with Akane, Eriri had every intention of not working for Akane. However, Utaha points out that she agreed with her comment about her slump and that she should think about the opportunity this presents. Some time later, Eriri calls Utaha over and convinces her that she is out of her slump and is able to draw better than ever, while also letting her know that she has accepted the offer to work on Field Chronicles XIII. With Eriri joining, Utaha decides to join the project in more of a supervisor role resulting in both girls leaving the circle. While Tomoya discusses the future of his next project with Iori, Iori lets him know that he and Izumi have left Rouge en Rouge feeling that they could not do what they want by remaining in that circle. Tomoya goes up that slope where he met Megumi a year ago, and Megumi is waiting for him.
25	11	"Resume and Start the Game"; Transliteration: "Saiki to shinki no gēmusutāto" (Japanese: 再起と新規のゲームスタート)	Kanta Kamei	June 23, 2017
Megumi invites Tomoya to go on a date to the mall where she bought him a new pair of glasses, and Tomoya buys her a new hat. When they return to the slope, Megumi tells her the reason for the date as it is to show that despite Eriri and Utaha having left the circle, it will continue as long as he is there. Encouraged by Megumi, Tomoya heads to the train station to say goodbye to Eriri and Utaha as they prepared to head for Osaka. Tomoya lets them know that he supports their decision to leave and promises to buy the game. As Eriri attempts to kiss Tomoya, Utaha kisses him instead, causing a jealous reaction from Eriri as the two end up missing the train. A new school year starts and Izumi enrolls in Tomoya's school. Eriri, Utaha, and Michiru secretly watch Tomoya, and the girls end up arguing.
