= List of Saekano characters =

The characters for the anime series appear clockwise from top: Izumi Hashima, Michiru Hyodo, Eriri Spencer Sawamura, Tomoya Aki, Megumi Kato, and Utaha Kasumigaoka.

The following is a list of characters for the light novel and anime series Saekano.

== Blessing Software ==
The main characters are members of a dōjin group named Blessing Software. They plan to produce a visual novel with a main heroine modeled by Megumi.

=== Tomoya Aki ===
Tomoya Aki (安芸 倫也, Aki Tomoya)
Voiced by: Yoshitsugu Matsuoka
The main viewpoint character. He is a student in class 2B of Toyogasaki Academy. As an otaku, he enjoys reading Manga and light novels, watching anime and playing galge. He recruits Megumi Kato, his childhood friend Eriri and student novelist Utaha on working a visual novel game. He serves as the producer, director and programmer for Blessing Software, and manages Michiru's band "Icy Tail". In his adult years, he is married to Megumi, and becomes the president and screenwriter for Blessing Software company.

=== Megumi Kato ===
Megumi Kato (加藤 恵, Katō Megumi)
Voiced by: Kiyono Yasuno
Tomoya's classmate and the title character who, despite being good-looking, is otherwise so ordinary that she does not stand out in class at all. She knows little about the culture, but never keeps Tomoya at their length. Her attitude toward him is often described as that of an ordinary person, but she is very close to him. She is the inspiration and working model for him, and one of the main heroines of Blessing Software's game. She helps Tomoya with programming and directing. She grows her hairstyle long, but cuts it short at the end of the series. Megumi stays by his side even when he is abandoned by others, and eventually develops feelings for him. In the final volume of the light novel, they both confess their feelings for each other and kiss. She says she will always stay by his side and keep loving him no matter what he chooses to do in his life. It is shown in the anime film that they are happily married, and she became the president and vice president of Blessing Software.

=== Eriri Spencer Sawamura ===
Eriri Spencer Sawamura (澤村・スペンサー・英梨々, Sawamura Supensā Eriri)
Voiced by: Saori Ōnishi
Tomoya's best friend and childhood friend, a student in class 2G and the most promising painter on the art club.^{LN 1} Born to a British father and a Japanese mother, she has blond hair styled in twin tails. She is very popular at school, acting as a refined lady,^{LN 1} but harbors a secret otaku lifestyle shared with Tomoya and making adult-themed manga under the pseudonym Eri Kashiwagi (柏木 エリ, Kashiwagi Eri) in a group called "Egoistic-Lily". Tomoya recruits her to be the illustrator of Blessing Software. Tomoya describes her as an astounding beauty, but upon peeling off her surface personality, she has a cruel, sadistic, passionate and animalistic nature. She harbours feelings for Tomoya but refuses to admit it. She and Tomoya remain friends.^{LN 1}

=== Utaha Kasumigaoka ===
Utaha Kasumigaoka (霞ヶ丘 詩羽, Kasumigaoka Utaha)
Voiced by: Ai Kayano
A student in class 3C, and an up-and-coming young novelist under the pseudonym of Utako Kasumi (霞 詩子, Kasumi Utako).^{LN 1} Her first light novel, Koisuru Metronome, was published under the Fushikawa Fantastic Bunko imprint and had sold over 500,000 copies. She has both intelligence and beauty, and is the brightest student in the school. Most of the students hold her in awe.^{LN 1} Tomoya describes her as having long black-hair with an expressionless and quiet nature that gives her the appearance of a beauty, but harbors a sharp and critical tongue.^{LN 1} She calls Tomoya Rinri-kun (倫理君), translated into English as "Mr. Ethical", after he flatly rejected her suggestion that he read the last volume of Koisuru Metronome before it is published. She develops feelings for Tomoya as the series progresses. She is in charge of writing the scenario for the game by Blessing Software. She shared with Tomoya her first kiss and she said she wanted to live with Tomoya in the future and give her life to him, though he only sees her as nothing more than a classmate.

=== Izumi Hashima ===
Izumi Hashima (波島 出海, Hashima Izumi)
Voiced by: Chinatsu Akasaki
A student in class 3A of Honoda Junior High, and is two years younger than Tomoya. She is an otaku and the member of the dōjin circle "Fancy Wave" (ファンシーウェーブ, Fanshī Wēbu). It was through Tomoya's influence that she became interested in otaku culture. She is deeply grateful to Tomoya for this. She has loved Little Love Rhapsody (リトルラブ・ラプソディ, Ritoru Rabu Rapusodī), an otome video game series released by Sonar (a parody of Sony Interactive Entertainment) since Tomoya bought her Little Love Rhapsody 2 and a PlayStation Portable console on her birthday. There is a rivalry between Eriri and Izumi, and she decides to compete with her in the next Winter Comiket. Izumi made up her mind to be the illustrator for her brother Iori's dōjin circle "Rouge en rouge".

=== Michiru Hyoudou ===
Michiru Hyoudou (氷堂 美智留, Hyōdō Michiru)
Voiced by: Sayuri Yahagi
Tomoya's cousin and a student in class 3, in the second year of Tsubaki Girls' Senior High School. She is a very versatile girl, except for her poor performance in school. She is good at almost everything and does not stick to anything for long, but she absorbs in singing her favorite songs and playing the guitar in the band "Icy Tail" (an unintentional pun on the word "Aishiteru" (愛してる/I love you)) for the past year. Michiru had a prejudice against otaku culture and was not happy about Tomoya being an otaku until her bandmates revealed that they were both. Michiru composes the music for the Blessing Software game.

== Secondary groups ==
=== Rouge en rouge ===
Rouge en rouge
A well-known dōjin circle that plans to release the game Towa to Setsuna no Évangile (永遠と刹那のエヴァンジル, Towa to Setsuna no Ebanjiru; lit. The Gospel of Eternity and Transience) with illustrations by Izumi at the next Winter Comiket. Its members include Iori Hashima (波島 伊織, Hashima Iori) (Voiced by: Tetsuya Kakihara), Izumi's older brother and the circle's representative, and Akane Kosaka (紅坂 朱音, Kōsaka Akane) (Voiced by: Hitomi Nabatame), the manga artist and founder of the group.

=== Fushikawa Shoten ===
Fushikawa Shoten (不死川書店)
A publishing company which has its own light novel publishing imprint Fushikawa Fantastic Bunko (不死川ファンタスティック文庫), used by Utaha's editor Sonoko Machida (町田 苑子, Machida Sonoko) (Voiced by: Houko Kuwashima).

=== Icy Tail ===
Icy Tail (アイシー・テール, Aishī Tēru)
An all-female band consisting of mostly otaku enthusiasts. Its members include Michiru Hyodo on guitar; Tokino Himekawa (姫川 時乃, Himekawa Tokino), a petite girl who also plays guitar (voiced by Eri Suzuki), Echika Mizuhara (水原 叡智佳, Mizuhara Echika) on bass (voiced by Rui Tanabe), and Ranko Morioka (森丘 藍子, Morioka Ranko) on drums (voiced by Yō Taichi). The band's name is a pun on the Japanese word aishiteru (愛してる).

== Cherry Blessing ==
Cherry Blessing (cherry blessing 〜巡る恵みの物語〜, Cherī Buresshingu - Meguru Megumi no Monogatari; lit. Cherry Blessing: The Reincarnation Story of a Blessing) is the name of the visual novel that the Blessing Software group develops.

=== Seiji Azumi ===
Seiji Azumi (安曇 誠司, Azumi Seiji)
The main protagonist. He is a reincarnation of Soma with vague memories of the ancestors. He is modeled on Tomoya.

=== Soma Hinoe ===
Soma Hinoe (丙 双真, Hinoe Sōma)
Seiji's great-grandfather. He inherited the supernatural ability to remember what his ancestors experienced, and he has vivid memories of his ancestors.

=== Meguri Kano ===
Meguri Kano (叶 巡璃, Kanō Meguri)
One of the two main heroines. She is Seiji's classmate and a reincarnation of Ruri with vague memories of her ancestors. She is modeled on Megumi.

=== Ruri Hinoe ===
Ruri Hinoe (丙 瑠璃, Hinoe Ruri)
One of the two main heroines. She is Meguri's great-grandmother. She is Soma's sister and his fiancée. She loves him deeply. She inherited the supernatural ability to remember what her ancestors experienced, and so she has vivid memories of distant ancestors of hers. Her personality is modeled on Utaha.
Kirari Spider Kawamura (河村・スパイダー・きらり, Kawamura Supaidā Kirari)
One of the heroines. She is Seiji's childhood friend. She is modeled on Eriri.

=== Kaho Hibarigaoka ===
Kaho Hibarigaoka (雲雀ヶ丘 歌穂, Hibarigaoka Kaho)
One of the heroines. She calls Seiji Seijitsu-kun (Note: Seijitsu (誠実) is the Japanese word for "sincerity".) (誠実君). She is modeled on Utaha.

=== Miharu Endo ===
Miharu Endo (炎藤 美晴留, Endō Miharu)
One of the heroines and Seiji's cousin. She is modeled on Michiru.

== Other characters ==
=== Keiichi Kato ===
Keiichi Kato (加藤 圭一, Katō Keiichi)
Voiced by Soma Saito
Megumi's cousin and a student at Johoku Medical School. Keiichi has short, spiky and quite straight brown hair that reaches to his ears and blue-sea eyes. He accompanies Megumi at a café where Tomoya works, but Tomoya mistook Keiichi for Megumi's boyfriend. However, Megumi quickly cleared the misunderstanding afterwards.

=== Sayuri Sawamura ===
Sayuri Sawamura (澤村 小百合, Sawamura Sayuri)
Voiced by Mai Nakahara
Eriri's mother with a long dark purple hair, tied into two twintails laced with two ribbons on each side and brown eyes. Tomoya described Sayuri to be so similar to Eriri that they could be mistaken for twins. Sayuri is a kind, soft spoken and generous young woman. However, it is revealed that she is a fujoshi.

=== Yoshihiko Kamigo ===
Yoshihiko Kamigo (上郷 喜彦, Kamigō Yoshihiko) (Note: Yoshihiko's family name "上郷" may be read either Kamigō or Kamisato. It's unclear which reading is correct for him. Kamisato is indicated in the first volume and Kamigō is indicated in volume five.)
Voiced by Yuma Uchida
One of Tomoya's friends.

== Works cited ==
- "LN" is shortened form for light novel and refers to a volume number of the Saekano light novels.
- "Ch." and "Vol." is shortened form for chapter and refers to a chapter number of the Saekano manga.
