= Saekano the Movie: Finale =

2019 Japanese animated film by Akihisa Shibata

- Theatrical release poster
- Kanji: 冴えない彼女(ヒロイン)の育てかた Fine(フィーネ)
- Revised Hepburn: Saenai Heroine no Sodate-kata. Fine
- Directed by: Akihisa Shibata; Kanta Kamei (Note: Credited as Chief Director (総監督, Sō Kantoku).)
- Screenplay by: Fumiaki Maruto
- Based on: Saekano: How to Raise a Boring Girlfriend by Fumiaki Maruto
- Produced by: Akitoshi Mori; Manabu Jingūji; Takumi Morii
- Starring: Yoshitsugu Matsuoka; Kiyono Yasuno; Saori Ōnishi; Ai Kayano; Sayuri Yahagi; Chinatsu Akasaki; Tetsuya Kakihara
- Cinematography: Hisayoshi Yamamoto; Yuichiro Tozawa
- Edited by: Akari Saitō
- Music by: Hajime Hyakkoku
- Backgrounds by: Yusa Ito
- Production company: CloverWorks
- Distributed by: Aniplex
- Release date: October 26, 2019 (Japan)
- Running time: 115 minutes
- Country: Japan
- Language: Japanese
- Box office: US$6.6 million

Saekano the Movie: Finale (Japanese: 冴えない彼女(ヒロイン)の育てかた Fine(フィーネ), Hepburn: Saenai Heroine no Sodate-kata. Fine) (Note: "Fine" is pronounced as /ˈfiːneɪ/ instead of /faɪn/.) is a 2019 Japanese animated romantic comedy film based on the final six volumes of Saekano: How to Raise a Boring Girlfriend light novel series by Fumiaki Maruto, who also served as the film's screenwriter. The story follows Tomoya Aki and Megumi Katō in the development of their next game for Blessing Software after Eriri Spencer Sawamura and Utaha Kasumigaoka left the circle. The film was produced by CloverWorks, and directed by Akihisa Shibata and Kanta Kamei.

The film stars Yoshitsugu Matsuoka, Kiyono Yasuno, Saori Ōnishi, Ai Kayano, Sayuri Yahagi, Chinatsu Akasaki, and Tetsuya Kakihara, who all reprised their roles from the anime television series. Saekano the Movie: Finale was announced in December 2017, with Shibata, Kamei, and Maruto confirming their return for the film in October 2018.

The film premiered in Japan on October 26, 2019, and grossed over $6 million worldwide.

== Plot ==
After the performance of Michiru Hyodo's Icy Tail at a convention, Tomoya Aki and Megumi Katō meet up with everyone for an after-event party and to discuss the progress of the Blessing Software's game for the Winter Comiket. Utaha Kasumigaoka begins teasing Aki about their first kiss, (Note: As depicted in the final episode of Saekano: How to Raise a Boring Girlfriend Flat (2017).) earning the reaction of everyone. Akane Kosaka later joins them and begins complaining to Kasumigaoka and Eriri Spencer Sawamura about the game they are currently working on.

Aki struggles to complete the screenplay for the main heroine route of their game so he decides to visit Kasumigaoka in her apartment for opinion but encounters Kosaka instead. Kosaka agrees to check his script and finds it too pure for everyone in today's world to pursue so she advises him to add obscene scenarios to catch the viewers' attention. After their meeting, Aki begins planning for a date with Katō to celebrate her birthday but on the day of their meeting, he finds an unconscious Kosaka and accompanies her to a hospital, where he learned about the short-term paralysis of her right hand. Kasumigaoka and Sawamura become worried about their project as it still needs to be submitted on schedule despite the absence of Kosaka, who wanted them to come up with something amazing that they could be proud of. They decide to seek help from Aki to convince the main director to delay the deadline of their game for them to perfect the work. Aki tells Katō about the situation and decides to leave their circle temporarily to help them, causing her to feel heartbroken for his decision to give up everything they worked on.

Aki manages to convince the director to delay the deadline by two weeks and stays with Kasumigaoka and Sawamura to help them complete their game. Katō takes over the leadership role in the circle to help to finish the game on the schedule. At a meeting inside the Hashima residence, she ends up confessing her feelings for Aki in front of Hyodo and Izumi Hashima. After he helped Kasumigaoka and Sawamura, Aki returns home to meet up with Katō to discuss the script he came up with their main heroine route. He then confesses his feelings for her, and the two share a kiss. They begin working on their game, with Kasumigaoka and Sawamura, who both came to terms with the relationship between Aki and Katō, later visiting his house to help with the finishing touches. Blessing Software's game manages to sell a thousand copies at the Winter Comiket.

The post-credits scene takes place ten years later and shows scenarios depicting the future lives of the main characters, which turned out to be a fictional story written by Kasumigaoka for the Blessing Software's new game. Aki and Katō are now happily married and are the chairman and vice chairwoman of their company, while Kasumigaoka and Sawamura are hired as their writer and illustrator. The original members of Blessing Software reunite in Aki and Katō's apartment to begin working on their new game.

== Voice cast ==
- Yoshitsugu Matsuoka as Tomoya Aki:
  A third-year student at Toyogasaki High School and hardcore otaku, who represents Blessing Software. Matsuoka stated that the film would highlight Aki's "conflict" due to "dramatic turn of events" in his circle.
- Kiyono Yasuno as Megumi Katō:
  The main heroine of Blessing Software who becomes the vice president of the circle after Utaha Kasumigaoka and Eriri Spencer Sawamura left. Yasuno prepared herself upon hearing the film's adaptation of the final volumes of the light novel, which contained dialogues between Aki and Katō that made her feel "excited" and "nervous".
- Saori Ōnishi as Eriri Spencer Sawamura:
  Former illustrator of Blessing Software who currently works on a new game project called Fields Chronicle. Ōnishi described Sawamura a "sensitive person with human side" and having a wide "range of... emotions" as she faced trouble in the film.
- Ai Kayano as Utaha Kasumigaoka:
  Former scriptwriter of Blessing Software who currently in charge of game scenarios for Fields Chronicle. Kayano stated that her character's interaction with Sawamura would be one of the highlights of the film.
- Sayuri Yahagi as Michiru Hyodo:
  Aki's cousin and childhood friend who composes the music for Blessing Software's games.
- Chinatsu Akasaki as Izumi Hashima:
  Iori's younger sister who joins Blessing Software as their new illustrator after entering Aki's high school.
- Tetsuya Kakihara as Iori Hashima:
  Aki's former best friend who left Rouge en Rouge circle to become the producer of Blessing Software.

Additionally, Hitomi Nabatame and Houko Kuwashima reprise their roles from Saekano: How to Raise a Boring Girlfriend anime television series as Akane Kosaka and Sonoko Machida, respectively. Eri Suzuki, Rui Tanabe, and Yō Taichi return as the voices of Icy Tail band members Tokino Himekawa, Echika Mizuhara, and Ranko Morioka, respectively.

== Production ==
=== Development ===
A film adaptation of the sequel to Saekano: How to Raise a Boring Girlfriend Flat was announced at the Saekano: How to Raise a Boring Girlfriend Fes Flat ~Glistening Moment event in December 2017. In March 2018, Kurehito Misaki, the light novel illustrator, stated that the film would not be a compilation of its previous anime television series and believed that writer Fumiaki Maruto, who also served as a screenwriter, would work on it as details were being laid out.

In October 2018, the title of the film was revealed, with the word "Fine" referencing the musical term that means "end" in Italian, while CloverWorks and Aniplex were announced as the animation production studio and distributor, respectively. In June 2019, Sacra Music revealed that the film would be released in Japan on October 26.

=== Pre-production ===
In October 2018, Akihisa Shibata, who previously served as an episode director for two seasons of Saekano, was confirmed to be returning as the film's director, in addition to Kanta Kamei as the chief director and Tomoaki Takase as the character animation designer. In the same month, Yoshitsugu Matsuoka, Kiyono Yasuno, Saori Ōnishi, Ai Kayano, Sayuri Yahagi, Chinatsu Akasaki, and Tetsuya Kakihara were confirmed to reprise their roles for the film.

=== Post-production ===
The dubbing of the film took two days to complete. Manabu Jingūji, one of the film's producers, made sure that emotions and feelings had to be portrayed "to the finest details" during the dubbing session to "fully bring out" the characters.

== Music ==
In June 2019, Sacra Music announced the return of Luna Haruna as the performer of the film's ending theme music, titled "Glory Days", alongside Miku Sawai as the song's composer. Haruna revealed that the song's title had the meaning of "grace", which was the translation of Megumi Katō's first name.

== Marketing ==
In December 2018, the teaser trailer for Saekano the Movie: Finale was released on the film's official website. The film's official Twitter account released a new trailer in March 2019 and a two-minute full trailer in August. The film partnered with Lawson in promoting its release. Maruto wrote a serial novel titled Saekano: How to Raise a Boring Girlfriend After, which takes place between the film's ending and its post-credits scene. It was distributed to moviegoers on the day of the film's release.

== Release ==
=== Theatrical ===
Saekano the Movie: Finale premiered in Japan on October 26, 2019, with the cast appearing for their first stage greeting at the Shinjuku Wald 9 theater in Shinjuku.

=== Home media ===
Saekano the Movie: Finale was released on Blu-ray and DVD on September 23, 2020. The limited edition release includes a drama CD of the film titled Saenai Nakama no Tabidachi (冴えない仲間(ヒロイン)の旅立ち(glory days)).

== Reception ==
=== Box office ===
Saekano the Movie: Finale grossed $6.5 million in Japan and $131,802 in South Korea, for a worldwide total of $6.6 million.

The film earned $1.3 million in its opening weekend in Japan, ranking fifth behind Gemini Man (2019). In its second weekend, the film earned $783,800, coming in sixth. In its third weekend, the film earned $537,700, coming in tenth. The film placed back to sixth in its fourth weekend, seventh in its fifth weekend, and ninth in its sixth and seventh weekends. The film earned $170,700 in its eighth weekend, dropping out of the ranking.

Outside Japan, the film opened at 69 theaters in South Korea and earned $19,877 in its opening weekend, coming in tenth.

=== Critical response ===
Crystal "TsukinoTheHag" of Anime Trending praised the characters and their relationships, particularly between Kasumigaoka and Sawamura, and the ending, stating that Saekano the Movie: Finale was able to "tie up all of Tomoya [Aki]'s potential romantic relationships neatly without leaving loose threads". Kim Morrissy of Anime News Network graded the film "B+", saying that it "provides all the sweet closure and catharsis fans have been craving, excellent post-credits scene" but criticizing the story's omissions.
