= Tetsuya Kakihara =

Japanese voice actor and singer

- 柿原 徹也
- Born: 24 December 1982 (age 43); Düsseldorf, North Rhine-Westphalia, West Germany
- Occupations: Voice actor; singer
- Years active: 2002–present
- Agent: Zynchro
- Notable work: Tengen Toppa Gurren Lagann as Simon; Boruto as Deepa; Fairy Tail as Natsu Dragneel; Yowamushi Pedal as Jinpachi Toudou; Amnesia as Shin; Danganronpa V3: Killing Harmony as K1-B0; Corpse Party as Sakutaro Morishige; My Next Life as a Villainess: All Routes Lead to Doom! as Keith Claes; BlazBlue as Jin Kisaragi and Hakumen
- Musical career
- Genre: J-pop
- Instrument: Vocals
- Years active: 2010–present
- Label: Kiramune

Tetsuya Kakihara (柿原 徹也, Kakihara Tetsuya; born 24 December 1982) is a German-born Japanese voice actor and singer. He is a former member of 81 Produce. His agency, Zynchro, was established on 15 May 2013.

In 2010, Kakihara has been affiliated with Kiramune, a music label by Bandai Visual and Lantis, where he made his first mini album, Still on Journey. His first single, "String of Pain", served as the ending theme song for the anime series Hakkenden: Eight Dogs of the East. He has released two full albums, five mini albums and six singles. His third single, "咲いちゃいな (Saichaina)", was released on 15 April 2015.

Kakihara has voiced young men with fiery personalities, including Natsu Dragneel in Fairy Tail. He also starred in otome games, including Shin in Amnesia and K1-B0 in Danganronpa V3: Killing Harmony. He is also active in BL (boys' love) Drama CDs.

== Biography ==
Kakihara was fascinated by Japanese entertainment culture and decided to become a voice actor. In 2001, Kakihara went to the Amusement Media Academy (a vocational school for voice actors and artists) to study voice acting. While attending courses, he had part-time jobs and improved his Japanese through part-time school. He became a professional voice actor in 2003. He was nominated for the Best Rookie Actor award at the 1st Seiyu Awards.

== Filmography ==
=== Anime series ===
2003

- Monkey Typhoon (Announcer)

2004

- Doki Doki School Hours (Koro)
- Nepos Napos (Timo)

2005

- Oh My Goddess! (Male Student)
- Twin Princess of Wonder Planet (Bright)
- Magical Girl Lyrical Nanoha A's (Lævateinn, Graf Eisen, Landy/Randy(Operator B), Sand Dragon)

2006

- Ah! My Goddess: Flights of Fancy (Male Student)
- Black Lagoon (Rico, Ronnie, Ricardo)
- Fushigiboshi no Futagohime Gyu! (Bright)
- Kirarin Revolution (Toriya Kamiyama)
- Princess Princess (Yutaka Mikoto)

2007

- Dragonaut: The Resonance (Kazuki Tachibana)
- Magical Girl Lyrical Nanoha StrikerS (Lævateinn, Graf Eisen, Strada, Lat Cartos)
- Minami-ke (Fujioka)
- Prism Ark (Hyaweh)
- Romeo x Juliet (Mercutio)
- Tengen Toppa Gurren Lagann (Simon)
- Zombie-Loan (Lyca)
- Claymore (Orphelia's Brother)

2008

- Ga-Rei Zero (Masaki Shindou)
- Kannagi (Meguru Akiba)
- Kirarin Revolution Stage 3 (Nii)
- Linebarrels of Iron (Koichi Hayase)
- Nabari no Ou (Sōrō Katō)
- Pokémon the Series: Diamond and Pearl: (Reggie)

2009

- Bleach (Ggio Vega, Shinji Iijima)
- Cross Game (Mizuki Asami)
- Fairy Tail (Natsu Dragneel)
- Fullmetal Alchemist: Brotherhood (Kain Fuery)
- Hanasakeru Seishōnen (Toranosuke V Haga)
- Shangri-La (Medusa)
- Beyblade: Metal Fusion (Hyōma)
- Saint Seiya The Lost Canvas (Pegasus Tenma)

2010

- Battle Spirits Brave (Youth Glynnhorn)
- Hime Chen! Otogi Chikku Idol Lilpri aka. Lilpri (Wish/Chris)
- Maid Sama! (Gouki Aratake)
- Nura: Rise of the Yokai Clan (Jiro Shima)

2011

- Blue Exorcist (Amaimon)
- C (Kou Sennoza)
- Copihan (Omoto Kumogiri)
- Digimon Fusion (Ryōma Mogami)
- Dog Days (Gaul Galette des Rois)
- Fairy Tail (Natsu Dragneel, Natsu Dragion)
- HIGH SCORE (Tokiwazu Jiro)
- Moshidora (Keiichirō Asano)
- Nura: Rise of the Yokai Clan: Demon Capital (Jiro Shima)
- Sengoku Paradise Kiwami (Date Masamune: refer to 'popular culture section')
- Sket Dance (Masafumi Usui)
- Toriko (Tom)

2012

- Brave10 (Sarutobi Sasuke)
- Case Closed (Sumio Tateno)
- Dog Days' (Gaul Galette des Rois)
- K (Colorless King, Adolf K. Weismann)
- Mobile Suit Gundam AGE (Deen Anon)
- Ozuma (Sam Coyne)
- Saint Seiya Omega (Ryūhō)
- Smile PreCure! (Brian Taylor (ep 36))

2013

- Amnesia (Shin)
- BlazBlue Alter Memory (Jin Kisaragi, Hakumen)
- Hakkenden: Tōhō Hakken Ibun (Shino Inuzuka)
- Kamisama no Inai Nichiyōbi (Kiriko Zubreska)
- Magi: The Kingdom of Magic (Kouha Ren)
- Makai Ouji: Devils and Realist (Camio)
- Minami-ke: Tadaima (Fujioka)
- Pretty Rhythm: Rainbow Live (Kōji Mihama)
- Servant × Service (Jōji Tanaka)
- Yowamushi Pedal (Toudou Jinpachi)
- A Simple Thinking About Blood Type (Type AB-kun)

2014

- Baby Steps (Takuya Miyagawa)
- Bonjour♪Sweet Love Patisserie (Mitsuki Aoi)
- Fairy Tail (Natsu Dragneel)
- The File of Young Kindaichi Returns (Fūma Kamioka (ep 6~9))
- Dai-Shogun – Great Revolution (Keiichirō Tokugawa)
- Garo: The Animation (Pepe)
- Hōzuki no Reitetsu (Karauri)
- Log Horizon 2 (Rundelhaus Code)
- M3: Sono Kuroki Hagane (Minashi Maki)
- One Piece (Gardoa)
- Shōnen Hollywood (Ikuma Amaki)
- Tokyo ESP (Shindō Masaki)
- Yowamushi Pedal (Toudou Jinpachi)

2015

- Baby Steps Season 2 (Takuya Miyagawa)
- Beautiful Bones: Sakurako's Investigation (Haruto Imai)
- Dog Days (Gaul Galette des Rois)
- Himouto! Umaru-chan (Alex Tachibana)
- Rin-ne (Masato, Boxer(ep25))
- Saekano (Iori Hashima)
- Show by Rock!! (Yaiba)
- Sky Wizards Academy (Lloyd Allwin)
- Yu-Gi-Oh! Arc-V (Dennis Macfield)
- Magical Girl Lyrical Nanoha Vivid (Landy, Lat Cartos)
- Minna Atsumare! Falcom Gakuen (Lloyd Bannings)

2016

- Puzzle & Dragons Cross (Lance)
- Fairy Tail Zero (Natsu Dragneel (ep 1, 11, and 12))
- Divine Gate (Akane)
- Ojisan and Marshmallow (Isamu Wakabayashi)
- Prince of Stride: Alternative (Amatsu Ida)
- 12-sai: Chicchana Mune no Tokimeki (Ayumu Tsutsumi)
- B-Project: Kodou*Ambitious (Momotarou Onzai)
- Show by Rock!!♯ (Yaiba)
- Show by Rock!! Short!! (Yaiba)
- World Trigger (Yuiga Takeru)
- Tsukiuta. The Animation (You Haduki)
- Handa-kun (Reo Nikaido)
- Mobile Suit Gundam Unicorn RE:0096 (Angelo Sauper)
- Concrete Revolutio: The Last Song (Ganba)
- Touken Ranbu: Hanamaru (Uguisumaru)
- Soul Buster (Barin Yi)
- Nanbaka (Uno)
- Occultic;Nine (Shun Moritsuka)
- Servamp (Mikuni Alicein)

2017

- Nanbaka 2 (Uno)
- Yowamushi Pedal: New Generation (Toudou Jinpachi)
- Kenka Bancho Otome: Girl Beats Boys (Yuta Mirako)
- Time Bokan 24 (Sōji Okita)
- Code: Realize − Guardian of Rebirth (Victor Frankenstein)
- UQ Holder! Magister Negi Magi! 2 (Ikkuu Ameya)
- Dynamic Chord (Seri Yuisaki)
- Sengoku Night Blood (Kanetsugu Naoe)
- Kakuriyo: Bed and Breakfast for Spirits (Hideyoshi)

2018

- Doraemon (Hodoho)
- 100 Sleeping Princes & the Kingdom of Dreams (Marchia)
- Yowamushi Pedal: Glory Line (Toudou Jinpachi)
- Puzzle & Dragons (Dragon)
- Layton Mystery Tanteisha: Katori no Nazotoki File (Frederic Morden)
- Muhyo & Roji's Bureau of Supernatural Investigation (Yoichi Himukai)
- Hinomaru Sumo (Takuya Terahara)
- Fairy Tail (Natsu Dragneel)
- Million Arthur (also 2019) (Tekken Arthur)

2019

- B-Project: Zecchō Emotion (Momotarou Onzai)
- Namu Amida Butsu!: Rendai Utena (Dainichi Nyorai)
- Ensemble Stars! (Subaru Akehoshi)
- Arifureta: From Commonplace to World's Strongest (Kōki Amanogawa)
- Carole & Tuesday (Aaron)
- Stand My Heroes: Piece of Truth (Tsukasa Asagiri)
- Welcome to Demon School! Iruma-kun Season 1 (Andro M. Jazz)

2020

- Show by Rock!! Mashumairesh!! (Yaiba)
- My Next Life as a Villainess: All Routes Lead to Doom! (Keith Claes)
- Muhyo & Roji's Bureau of Supernatural Investigation Season 2 (Yōichi Himukai)
- Boruto: Naruto Next Generations (Deepa)
- Gibiate (Sensui Kanzaki)
- Mr Love: Queen's Choice (Kira (Kiro))
- A3! Season Autumn & Winter (Azuma Yukishiro)
- Tsukiuta. The Animation 2 (You Haduki)

2021

- Hortensia Saga (Leon D. Olivier)
- I-Chu: Halfway Through the Idol (Mio Yamanobe)
- Show by Rock!! Stars!! (Yaiba)
- Log Horizon: Destruction of the Round Table (Rundelhaus Code)
- Those Snow White Notes (Taketo)
- My Next Life as a Villainess: All Routes Lead to Doom! X (Keith Claes)
- Welcome to Demon School! Iruma-kun Season 2 (Andro M. Jazz)

2022

- Salaryman's Club (Kōki Takeda)
- Aharen-san Is Indecipherable (Ishikawa)
- Love All Play (Yōji Higashiyama)
- Heroines Run the Show (Megu)
- Tomodachi Game (Chisato Hashiratani)
- Cap Kakumei Bottleman DX (Haku Kurenai)
- Welcome to Demon School! Iruma-kun Season 3 (Andro M. Jazz)

2023

- Chillin' in My 30s After Getting Fired from the Demon King's Army (Gashita)
- My Hero Academia 6 (En Tayutai)

2024

- High Card Season 2 (Noah Forland)
- Wistoria: Wand and Sword (Julius Reinberg)
- Fairy Tail: 100 Years Quest (Natsu Dragneel)
- Tower of God 2nd Season (Quaetro Blitz)
- Blue Exorcist: Beyond the Snow Saga (Amaimon)

2025

- #Compass 2.0: Combat Providence Analysis System (Tadaomi Ōka)
- Betrothed to My Sister's Ex (Toppo)

2026

- A Gentle Noble's Vacation Recommendation (Eleven)

=== Original net animation ===
- Brotherhood: Final Fantasy XV (Prompto Argentum)
- The King of Fighters: Destiny (Matt)
- Xam'd: Lost Memories (Shiroza)

=== Original video animation ===
- Angel's Feather (Kyouhei Mitsugi)
- Black Jack Final – Karte 11 (Matsunojo)
- Corpse Party Missing Footage (Sakutarō Morishige)
- Corpse Party Tortured Souls (Sakutarō Morishige)
- Disgaea 5: Alliance of Vengeance (Zeroken)
- Fairy Tail OVA (Natsu Dragneel)
- Finder Series (Akihito Takaba)
- Minami-ke: Omatase (Fujioka)
- Mobile Suit Gundam: The Origin (Garma Zabi)
- Mobile Suit Gundam Unicorn (Angelo Sauper)
- My-Otome 0~S.ifr~ (Kid)
- Saint Seiya: The Lost Canvas (Pegasus Tenma)
- The New Prince of Tennis (Liliadent Krauser)
- The Prince of Tennis OVA (Liliadent Krauser)

=== Special ===
- Million Arthur: Farewell, Beloved Dancho (2019), (Tekken Arthur)

=== Anime films ===
- Gurren Lagann The Movie: Childhood's End (Simon)
- Naruto Shippuden: The Movie (Kusuna)
- Vexille (Taro)
- The Garden of Sinners: Paradox Spiral (2008) (Tomoe Enjou)
- Gurren Lagann The Movie: The Lights in the Sky are Stars (2009) (Simon)
- Kowarekake no Orgel (2009) (Keiichirō)
- Magical Girl Lyrical Nanoha The Movie 1st (2010) (Landy/Randy)
- Toriko 3D: Kaimaku! Gourmet Adventure!! (2011) (Tom)
- Fairy Tail the Movie: The Phoenix Priestess (2012) (Natsu Dragneel)
- Magical Girl Lyrical Nanoha The Movie 2nd A's (2012) (Landy/Randy, Lævateinn, and Graf Eisen)
- Fairy Tail Movie 2: Dragon Cry (2017) (Natsu Dragneel)
- Servamp -Alice in the Garden- (2018) (Mikuni Alicein)
- Saekano the Movie: Finale (2019) (Iori Hashima)
- My Next Life as a Villainess: All Routes Lead to Doom! The Movie (2023) (Keith Claes)

=== Video games ===
- A3! (Azuma Yukishiro)
- Akane-sasu Sekai de Kimi to Utau (Nagakura Shinpachi)
- Akiba's Trip Series (PSP) (Yuu Abeno)
  - Akiba's Trip
  - Akiba's Trip Plus
- Amnesia Series (Shin)
- Atelier Iris: Eternal Mana (Klein Kiesling)
- Atelier Iris 3: Grand Phantasm (Alvero Kronie/ Bersizel Krone)
- BlazBlue (Jin Kisaragi/Hakumen/Alternate Announcer)
- Code: Realize − Guardian of Rebirth (Victor Frankenstein)
  - Code: Realize ~Future Blessings~
  - Code: Realize ~Bouquet of Rainbows~
  - Code: Realize ~Wintertide Miracles~
- Cookie Run: Kingdom (Lilac Cookie)
- Corpse Party Series (Sakutarō Morishige)
  - Corpse Party BloodCovered: ...Repeated Fear
  - Corpse Party: Book of Shadows
  - Corpse Party: The Anthology: Sachiko's Game of Love Hysteric Birthday 2U
  - Corpse Party: Blood Drive
- CR Virtua Fighter (Lion Rafale)
- Danganronpa V3: Killing Harmony (K1-B0)
- Disgaea 5: Alliance of Vengeance (Zeroken)
- Dynasty Warriors Series (Zhu Ran)
  - Dynasty Warriors 8: Xtreme Legends
  - Dynasty Warriors 8: Empires
  - Dynasty Warriors 9
- Ensemble Stars! (Akehoshi Subaru)
- "Exorcism of Maria" Series (Klaus (Kurausu Eaharuto))
  - Exorcism of Maria (PC)
  - Exorcism of Maria: La Campanella (PSP)
- Fairy Tail series (Natsu Dragneel)
- Final Fantasy series
  - Final Fantasy XV (Prompto Argentum)
  - Dissidia Final Fantasy Opera Omnia (Prompto Argentum)
  - Dissidia Duellum Final Fantasy (Prompto Argentum)
- Fushigi Yūgi: Suzaku Ibun (Amiboshi and Suboshi)
- Garnet Cradle PSP (Sairenji Rihito)
- Gate of Nightmares (Manatsu)
- Genshin Impact (Scaramouche / Wanderer)
- Genso Suikoden Tierkreis NDS (Riu /Liu)
- Granblue Fantasy Mobile/Browser/PC (Elmott)
- Hero's Park iOS/Android (Saienji Ryo)
- Hoshizora no Komikku Gāden NDS (Kasudisu Koichi)
- Houkago wa Gin no Shirabe PS2/PC (Izumi Yuuto)
- I-Chu (Mio Yamanobe)
- Last Ranker PSP (Bayger)
- Lord of Vermilion Re:2 – Arcade (Jin Kisaragi)
- Lost Dimension (Agito Yuuki)
- Love Root Zero: KissKiss☆Labyrinth PS2 (Kuroe Kazuya)
- Mabinogi (Starlet/Aria: Male)
- Mahjong Soul (Ein, Usumi Ishihara)
- Majou Ou (Melvin)
- Mega Man Star Force 3 (A.C.Eos/Ace)
- Mega Man Zero 4 (Fenri Lunaedge)
- Mr Love: Queen's Choice (Kiro / Zhou Qiluo / Kira)
- Onmyōji (Kisei)
- Phantasy Star Online 2 (Huey/Hans/Light/Elly/Quna fan/Male Extra Voice 01/Male Extra Voice 20/Male Extra Voice 21/Male Extra Voice 32)
- Psychedelica of the Black Butterfly PS Vita (Karasuba)
- Tokimeki Restaurant (Tsuji Kaito)
- "Renai Bancho" Series (PSP) (The Little Devil Banchou)
  - Renai Bancho: Inochi Meishi, Koiseyo Otome! Love is Power
  - Renai Bancho 2: Midnight Lesson!!!
- ROOT∞REXX: PlayStation Vita (Aki Hasumi, Akineko)
- SD Gundam series (Angelo Sauper, Roche Nattono)
- Seiken Densetsu 4 PS2 (Eldy)
- Shin Gundam Musou (Angelo Sauper)
- Shiratsuyu no Kai (Shima Takaomi)
- Solatorobo: Red the Hunter – NDS (Red Savarin)
- Stand My Heroes (iOS/Android) (Tsukasa Asagiri)
- Super Robot Wars series (Kouichi Hayase, Simon, Angelo Sauper)
- 'Tales of' series (Shing Meteoryte)
  - Tales of Hearts (DS)
  - Tales of the World: Radiant Mythology 3 (PSP)
  - Tales of the Heroes: Twin Brave
  - Tales of Hearts R (PS Vita)
- Tengen Toppa Gurren Lagann DS (Simon)
- Trails series (Lloyd Bannings)
  - The Legend of Heroes: Trails from Zero (PSP, PC)
  - The Legend of Heroes: Trails to Azure (PSP, PC)
  - The Legend of Heroes: Trails of Cold Steel II (PS Vita, PC, PS4)
  - The Legend of Heroes: Trails of Cold Steel IV (PS4)
  - The Legend of Heroes: Trails into Reverie (PS4)
- TSUKINO PARADISE (You Haduki)
- TSUKINO PARK (You Haduki)
- TSUKINO WORLD (You Haduki)
- Tsukitomo。-TSUKIUTA.12 memories- (You Haduki)
- CR Virtua Fighter (Lion Rafale)
- Wand of Fortune Series (PSP/PS2) (Lagi El Nagil)
  - Wand of Fortune: Mirai e no Prologue (Prologue to the future)
  - Wand of Fortune 2: Jikuu ni Shizumu Mokujiroku (Revelation sink into the space-time)
  - Wand of Fortune 2 FD 〜君に捧げるエピローグ
- Warriors Orochi 4 (Zhu Ran)
- World Flipper (Hopper)
- Zenless Zone Zero (Asaba Harumasa)
- Zettai Meikyuu Grimm (Akazukin)
- Illusion Connect (Ludwig)

=== Drama CDs ===
==== Anime/Game ====
- Amnesia (Shin)
- BlazBlue series – Vol. 1 to Vol. 3 (Jin Kisaragi/Hakumen)
- Dog Days (Gaul Galette des Rois)
- Iris Zero (Toru Mizushima)
- Maid Sama! (Ikuto Sarashina)
- Ranobe Ouji☆Seiya (Kazuma)
- Rockin' Heaven (Kido)
- Sengoku Paradise Kiwami Series – Vol. 1 and Vol. 2 (Date Masamune)
- Tales of Hearts series – Vol. 1 to Vol. 5 (Shing Meteoryte)
- Trails series (Lloyd Bannings)

==== Otome/Original ====
- Amnesia (Shin)
  - Amnesia: ～冥土の国のアムネシア～
  - Amnesia: Amnesia of the Dead
- Bad Medicine -Infectious Teachers- (Kashu Remu)
- Code:Realize ~Sousei no Himegimi~ as Victor Frankenstein
- Jooubachi no Oubou - Kougou Hen (Rin)
- Ketsuekigata Danshi/ Choose your favourite Blood Type boy! (Kurosaki Miyabi) as AB Type
- Koisuru Lesson Series "Ayumu Kunishiro no Happy Lesson" (Ayumu Kunishiro)
- "Love Root Zero" Series (Kuroe Kazuya)
  - ラブルートゼロ: 失恋と嘘、迷子な僕ら。
  - ラブルートゼロ Do you love me? ラブ√1/2
  - ラブルートゼロ サヨナラと言えない僕らは...
  - ラブルートゼロ Do you wanna kiss me? ラブ√1/3
- Perabu! A Cappella Love?! (Chihiro Mitsunaga)
- "Renai Bancho 2" Sweet Sweet Birthday!!! (The Little Devil Banchou)
- Samurai Drive (Takahara Ibuki)
- Shiratsuyu no Kai (Shima Takaomi)
- Vanquish Brothers (Shingen)
- "Wand of Fortune" Series (Lagi El Nagil)
  - Wand of Fortune: ～狙われた予告状～ (The Targeted notice letter)
  - Wand of Fortune: ～ちいさなまほうのものがたり～ (The story of a little magic)
  - Wand of Fortune: ～ルルのいない朝～
  - Wand of Fortune 2: "巡り会えた奇跡"
  - Wand of Fortune 2: "歓迎！ミルス・クレア病院" (Welcome! Mills Clare Hospital)
  - Wand of Fortune 2 FD: "7つの時空でパパといっしょ！"
- Zoku Fushigi Kobo Shokogun Episode7 as himself/narrator
- Mr. Love: Dream Date (Kiro)

==== BL Drama CDs ====
- Akanai Tobira (あかないとびら) (Masuoka)
- Dekiru Otoko no sodate kata (デキる男の育て方) Vol. 1 and Vol. 2 (Kazuha)
- Finder Series (Akihito Takaba)
  - One Wing in the Finder (ファインダーの隻翼)
  - Target in the Finder (ファインダーの標的) from Be-Boygold magazine special Drama CD Animix Anime OVA
- Hidoku Shinaide'Treat Me Gently' (酷くしないで) (Nemugasa Takashi)
- Honey Boys Spiral (ハニーボーイズ スパイラル) (Hiro Nakanishi)
- Honto Yajuu (ほんと野獣) Vol. 1, 2 and 3 (Aki Gotouda)
- Houkago wa Dokusen Yoku (放課後は独占欲) (Kouji Yaegashi)
- Iro Otoko (彩おとこ) (Ai Ishikawa)
- Iro Otoko ~Kyoudai Hen~ (彩おとこ~兄弟篇~) (Ai Ishikawa)
- Migawari Ouji no Junai (身代わり王子の純愛) (Hikaru)
- Omake no Ouji Sama (オマケの王子様) (Rio Takatsuka)
- Senzoku de Aishite (専属で愛して) (Yuuya Kanoe)
- Shitsuji Gēmu 'Butler game' (執事★ゲーム) (Rau)
- Uchi no Tantei Shirimasenka? (ウチの探偵知りませんか?) (Shigure)

=== Tokusatsu ===
- Kamen Rider × Kamen Rider × Kamen Rider The Movie: Cho-Den-O Trilogy Episode Red (2010) (Piggies Imagin (Third Son) (Voiced by Kazuya Nakai (Eldest Son), Kousuke Toriumi (Second Son)))

=== Radio ===
Kakihara is active in the following online anime-related radio programs.

- Brave 10 on the radio @ Hibiki Radio Japan starring (Sarutobi Sasuke)
- Fairy Tail Web Radio starring (Natsu Dragneel)

=== Dubbing ===
==== Live-action ====
- Admission (Jeremiah Balakian (Nat Wolff))
- The Girl in the Spider's Web (Mikael Blomkvist (Sverrir Gudnason))
- The Long Way Home (Kim Young-kwang (Yeo Jin-goo))
- Looking for Jackie (Zhang Yishan)
- Love Island (James McCool)

==== Animation ====
- Maya the Bee (Sting)
- Mune: Guardian of the Moon (Glim's Father)
- Playmobil: The Movie (Del)
- Teenage Mutant Ninja Turtles (2003 TV series) (Leonardo)
- Thunderbirds Are Go (Gordon Tracy)
- A Turtle's Tale: Sammy's Adventures (Ray)

== Discography (as a singer) ==
Kakihara released his debut mini-album, Still on Journey, on 24 November 2010, which is produced by Kiramune Project. His second mini-album, Continuous was released on 15 February 2012, third mini-album, Call Me, was released on 13 March 2013, and fourth mini-album. "ダンディギ・ダン (Dandigi dan)", was released on 30 July 2014. His first single (on the Kiramune label) is called "String of pain", released on 6 February 2013. It is the ending theme song for anime Hakkenden: Eight Dogs of the East in which he also voices the main role of Shino Inuzuka.

He attended the following live music performances:

- Kiramune Music Festival 2010 (aka. Kira Fes), in which a DVD was released on 25 February 2011.

– Track list of Kakihara's Songs (in order of performance)*: 1. my life my time 2. Electric Monster 3. Endless Journey

- Kiramune Music Festival 2012, held on 17 & 18 March 2012 in Japan. The DVD was released 24 August 2012.

– Track list of Kakihara's Songs (in order of performance)*: 1.adrenaline 2.Good Luck 3.Chaos Breaker 4.Labyrinth 5.Bible of Heart 6.Hikari 7.thank you & smile 8.Continue

- Kiramune Music Festival 2013, held on 13 & 14 April 2013 in Japan. The DVD release will be 6 November 2013.

- Kakihara's Set list: 1.Hands up 2.Cheers!! 3.Call My Name 4.運命の引力 5.String of pain 6. Eternal screaming

- On 2 and 9 September 2012;– he starred as lead singer in Joint Live 'Versus', a live music event held by Kiramune. Track listing and event report:
- On 7 and 8 September 2013;– he held his first solo live concert, called Kiramune Presents Tetsuya Kakihara First Live Generations.
- Kiramune Music Festival 2014, held on 22 & 23 March 2014 to celebrate Kiramune's 5th Anniversary. The DVD & BD were released on 24/12/2014.

– Kakihara's Setlist: 1.GENERATIONS 2.ocean flying 3.ラプソディー 4.Labyrinth 5.Number One 6.Call My Name

- Kiramune Music Festival 2015, held on 9 & 10 May 2015.

– Kakihara's Setlist: 1.ダンディギ 2.world in bloom 3.Othello 4.君の声に 5.DEAR MY GIRL 6.咲いちゃいな

- Kiramune Music Festival 2016, held on 4 & 5 June 2016.

– Kakihara's Setlist: 1.咲いちゃいな 2.レッスンAtoB 3.僕さ 4.オレンジ 5.Call My Name 6.monogram 7.進ませろ！

- Kiramune Music Festival 2016: Kakihara's Setlist: 1.リングオブドランカー 2.Othello 3.ドラマ 4.GENERATIONS 5.ダンディギ 6.オレンジ 7.Start of LIFE

=== Singles ===
| Date released | Title & track listing | UPC/product code |
|---|---|---|
| 6 February 2013 | String of Pain; 1. String of Pain; 2. 運命の引力; 3. String of Pain (off vocal); 4. 運命の引力 (off vocal) | LACM-14052 |
| 18 September 2013 | GENERATIONS; 1. GENERATIONS; 2. U R my Sunshine!: 3. ラプソディー (Rhapsody); DVD version: includes PV of "Generations", and trailers | LACM-34128 （Deluxe） LACM-14128 （Normal） |
| 15 April 2015 | 咲いちゃいな (Saichaina); 1. 咲いちゃいな (Saichaina); 2. world in bloom 3. Othello; DVD version (Deluxe Edition); 1. 咲いちゃいな (Saichaina) (Music Clip); 2. TRAILER | LACM-34317 (Deluxe Edition); LACM-14317 (Regular Edition) |
| 15 June 2016 | 進ませろ！ (Susumasero！); 1. 進ませろ！ (Susumasero！); 2. My way 3. 碧く (Aoku); DVD version (Deluxe Edition); 1. 進ませろ! (Susumasero！) (MUSIC CLIP); 2. TRAILER | LACM-34491 (Deluxe Edition); LACM-14491 (Regular Edition) |
| 15 June 2016 | トコナツウェーブ (Tokonatsu Wave); 1. トコナツウェーブ (Tokonatsu Wave); 2. 君はどう思ってるの (Kimi wa Dou Omotteru no); 3. オジー自慢のオリオンビール (Ojī Jiman no Orion Beer); DVD version (Deluxe Edition); 1. トコナツウェーブ (Tokonatsu Wave) (MUSIC CLIP); 2. TRAILER | LACM-34605 (Deluxe Edition); LACM-14605 (Regular Edition) |
| 14 February 2018 | DIAMOND BEAT; 1. DIAMOND BEAT; 2. ごめんね、ありがとう。 (Gomen ne、Arigatou。); 3. MOVING; DVD version (Deluxe Edition); 1. DIAMOND BEAT (MUSIC CLIP); 2. TRAILER | LACM-34605 (Deluxe Edition); LACM-14605 (Regular Edition) |

=== Mini albums ===
| Date released | Title & track listing | UPC/product code |
|---|---|---|
| 24 November 2010 | still on Journey; 1. my life my time 2. adrenaline 3. Electric Monster; 4. Number One; 5. thank you & smile 6. Endless Journey; Normal Version: 6 tracks Deluxe Version: 6 tracks + DVD (My Life My Time (Music Clip), making of 'still on Journey', and trailer) DVD Length: 24 minutes | LACA-35077 （Deluxe） LACA-15077 （Normal） |
| 15 February 2012 | Continuous; 1. Chaos Breaker; 2. Good Luck; 3. Labyrinth; 4. Bible of Heart; 5. Hikari; 6. Continue; Normal Version: 6 tracks Deluxe Version: 6 tracks + DVD (Chaos Breaker (Music Clip), making of 'Chaos Breaker', and trailer) | LACA-35182 （Deluxe） LACA-15182 （Normal） |
| 13 March 2013 | Call Me; 1. Call My Name; 2. Hands up 3. Eternal screaming 4. 運命の引力 (Unmei no Inryoku); 5. ocean flying 6. Cheers!! Normal Version: 6 tracks Deluxe Version: 6 tracks + DVD (Call My Name (Music CLip), digest of "Versus" live – Kakihara edition, and trailer) | LACA-35277 （Deluxe） LACA-15277 （Normal） |
| 30 July 2014 | ダンディギ・ダン (Dandigi dan); 1. ダンディギ (Dandigi); 2. カモンx3 (Come On x3); 3. Supernova; 4. inside wall 5. 君の声に (Kimi no koe ni); 6. GENERATIONS; Normal Edition: 6 tracks (CD Only); Deluxe/Limited Edition: 6 tracks (CD + DVD); DVD Content: 1. ダンディギ (MUSIC CLIP); 2. digest of "TETSUYA KAKIHARA First Live 'GENERATIONS'"; 3. TRAILER | LACA-35426 (Deluxe Edition); LACA-15426 (Regular Edition) |
| 21 December 2016 | Circle of LIFE; 1. Start of LIFE; 2. AGAIN AND AGAIN; 3. ドラマ (Drama); 4. 聴かせて (Kikasete); 5. リングオブドランカー (Ring of Drunker); 6. Hikari -Winter ver. Normal Version: 6 tracks Deluxe Version: 6 tracks + DVD (Start of LIFE (MUSIC CLIP), making of "Circle of LIFE", & TRAILER) | LACA-35616 （Deluxe） LACA-15616 （Normal） |
| 17 April 2019 | United Star; 1. オンリースター (Only Star); 2. 前進アッペンダン↑^_^↓ (Zenshin Appendan ↑^_^↓); 3. ray 4. メッセージ (Message); 5. WALK ON; 6. 夜が (Yoru ga); Normal Version: 6 tracks Deluxe Version: 6 tracks + DVD (Only Star (MUSIC CLIP), making of "Only Star", Tetsuya Kakihara Livetour 2018 "I for U", making of "I for U", & TRAILER) | LACA-35786 （Deluxe） LACA-15786 （Normal） |

=== Albums ===
| Date released | Title & track listing | UPC/product code |
|---|---|---|
| 28 October 2015 | orange 1. レッスンAtoB (LessonAtoB); 2. 愛がモットー (Ao ga Mottō); 3. 僕さ (Boku sa); 4. オレンジ (Orange); 5. Border Rain; 6. monogram 7. Brightness; 8. 咲いちゃいな (Saichaina); 9. 飛行機雲 (Hikoukigumi); 10. またあした (Matāshita); Normal Version: 10 tracks Deluxe Version: 10 tracks + DVD (オレンジ (Orange) (MUSIC CLIP), making of "orange", & TRAILER) | LACA-35515 （Deluxe） LACA-15515 （Normal） |
| 23 May 2018 | I for U 1. HERE FOR U 2. Actors; 3. 通り風 (Tōri Kaze); 4. カントリーロード (Country Road); 5. 始まりの日 (Hajimari no Hi); 6. Don't Doubt!: 7. Last Lady; 8. 五月雨 (Samidare); 9. Sing it!; 10. 虹唄 (Niji Uta); Normal Version: 10 tracks Deluxe Version: 10 tracks + DVD (HERE FOR U (MUSIC CLIP), making of "HERE FOR U", & TRAILER) | LACA-35722 （Deluxe） LACA-15722 （Normal） |
| 25 November 2020 | Live in ToKyo; 1. AM#DRIVE; 2. エンドレスじゃーねー; 3. コモンセンス・プロミネンス; 4. たったひとつのモノ; 5. Good time 6. Go to the top 7. GET STARTED; 8. 東京; 9. Looking up Laughing; 10. 約束; Normal Version: 10 tracks Deluxe Version: 10 tracks + BD (AM#DRIVE (MUSIC CLIP), making of "Live in ToKyo", digest of Kakihara Tetsuya Live tour 2019 "To the Starting Over" & TRAILER) | LACA-35847 （Deluxe） LACA-15847 （Normal） |

== Anime character music CDs/song listing ==
Listing of anime character songs that were released on CD as singles or as a track on anime character album(s). Song names in double quotes.

- Amnesia (as Shin)
  - Amnesia Character CD vol 1 "In Your Heart"
  - Amnesia Crowd Character CD vol 1 "Innumerable kisses"
- Angel's Feather (as Kyohei Mitsugi) "Rock Star" – OVA Opening Theme/Duet song
- B-Project (as Momotaro Onzai)
  - 永久パラダイス "永久パラダイス"
  - Glory Upper "Glory Upper", "Over the Rainbow" & "永久パラダイス (MooNs Ver.)"
  - Brand New Star "Brand New Star" & "ラブ☆レボリュ"
  - 鼓動＊アンビシャス "鼓動＊アンビシャス"
  - 星と月のセンテンス "夢見るPOWER"
  - B-Project: 鼓動＊アンビシャス Volume 3 "magic JOKER"
  - 無敵＊デンジャラス "無敵＊デンジャラス" & "永久パラダイス (14 Vocal Ver.)"
  - SUMMER MERMAID "SUMMER MERMAID" & "パノラマ"
  - S級パラダイス WHITE "S級パラダイス" & "PRAY FOR..."
  - GO AROUND "GO AROUND" & "Movin' on "
  - 快感エブリデイ "快感エブリデイ" & "After all this time"
  - 絶頂＊エモーション "絶頂＊エモーション" & "光と影の時結ぶ"
- Brave10 Anime Opening CD (as Sarutobi Sasuke)
- Corpse Party Character CD: 男性編 "Whisper of the Nightmare '♂Scorpion♂'" (as Sakutarō Morishige)
- Dynasty Warriors series (as Zhu Ran)
  - "Dynasty Warriors 8 Character Song Album 5: Tales of Bravery" – "Red Passion"
- Exorcism of Maria Character Album: gran jubilee vol.3 天の揺り篭編 (as Klaus/Kurausu Eaharuto)
- Fairy Tail Series (as Natsu Dragneel)
  - Character Album Eternal Fellows – Opening Theme Song for "Fairy Tail OVAs"
  - Character Song Collection: Natsu & Gray "Blaze Up"
  - Character Album 2 "キズナだろー!!" – Opening Theme Song for "Fairy Tail PSP game: Zeref's Awaken"
  - Character Album 2 "いつも全開だ"
  - Fairy Tail Soundtrack 4 "Blow Away" – Duet Song with Gray
- Hakkenden: Eight Dogs of the East (as Shino)
  - Character Song Album Vol.1 "Wing in the Darkness"
  - Image Song CD Vol.1 "無敵のBuddy" – special CD is bundled with Anime 'Hakkenden' Blu-ray Vol. 1 First Press edition
  - Image Song CD Vol.6 "純潔" – special CD is bundled with Anime 'Hakkenden' Blu-ray Vol. 6 First Press edition
- Hoshizora no Komikku Gāden Series (as Kasudisu Koichi)
  - Theme Song CD "キラキラ〜Looking for my best Friends" – Opening Theme Song
  - Character CD Vol.1 POP Caramel "Starring in the Dream"
  - Character CD Vol.1 POP Caramel "Puzzle"
- Houkago wa Gin no Shirabe Character CD: 〜琥珀の調べ〜 和泉悠斗 (as Izumi Yuuto) "Silver Gray"
- Love Root Zero (as Kazuya Kuroe)
  - Best Album 君に捧げるコイゴコロ / Character CD: Kazuya Kuroe "約束するよ"
  - Best Album 君に捧げるコイゴコロ "Perfect World" – Opening Theme Song for "Love Root Zero kiss kiss Labyrinth (PS2)"
- Makai Ouji: Devils and Realist – Anime OP/ED CD (as Camio) "Believe My Dice"、"a shadow's love song"
- Minami-ke (as Fujioka)
  - Character Song Album "桜色ラブレター"
  - Minami-ke Tadaima Character Song Album "夏色恋風"
- Okane ga nai Opening & Ending CD (as Ishii Tetsuo) "愛しい人よ永遠に 温もりを伝えて..." – Ending Theme/Duet song
- Prince of Tennis Character CD (as Liliadent Krauser) "Dead or Alive"
- Princess Princess Character Song: Sweet Suite vol.2 (as Yutaka Mikoto) Cutie Honey
- ROOT∞REXX (as Aki Hasumi/Akineko) – PlayStation Vita OP Song: Honey Bunny (Mini Album)
  - Honey Bunny (Track No. 1)
  - Dear My Girl (Track No. 4)
  - Dear My Girl ~Piano Version~ (Track No. 8)
- Saint Seiya: The Lost Canvas Character Album (as Pegasus Tenma) "Legend of Us"
- Saint Seiya Omega Song Collection (as Dragon Ryūhō) "明日へ吹く風"
- Sengoku Paradise Kiwami – Anime Opening CD (as Date Masamune) "リターン乱世独眼竜" – Opening Theme Song in Episodes 1,4,5,8,10 etc ※CD is also bundled with "Sengoku Paradise Kiwami" Vol.2 Anime DVD – as a 'Special CD-DVD Box Set
- Tengen Toppa Gurren Lagann Character Album (as Simon) "Breakthrough the Dream" – Duet song
- Tsukiuta. (as You Haduki)
  - Genau! Solo Character Album "Genau!"(song title & some lyrics are in German) & "夏とキミにおもてなし（原題:夏の思い出）"
  - El Sol Florecer Solo Character Album "El Sol Florecer"&"真夏のサプライズ！ "
  - DA☆KAI Duet Character Album "DA☆KAI"
  - 淡い花 Duet Character Album "淡い花"
  - Hee!Hee!Foo!Foo! Solo Character Album "Hee!Hee!Foo!Foo!" & "君は華麗なる「Laila」"
  - ONE CHANCE? Unit CD "ONE CHANCE?"
  - TSUKIUTA. THE ANIMATION Theme Song CD "LOLV -Lots of Love-"
  - TSUKIUTA. THE ANIMATION Vol. 4 "sol~Happy!Phew!~"
  - TSUKIUTA. THE ANIMATION Vol. 7 "ツキノウタ。 "
- Wand of Fortune Character Song Mini Album (as Lagi El Nagil)
  - "Blazing Guy"
  - "ウラハラ協奏曲（ラプソディ）"闇☆炎☆土 – Group Song
- Zettai Meikyu Grimm Character Song Concept CD: Vol.1"野イチゴを摘むあかずきん" (as Akazukin)

== Anime conventions ==
- Otakon 2012 – 27–29 July 2012 (as voice actor guest) at Baltimore Convention Center (Baltimore, Maryland, USA)

== DVD/live events as an idol artist ==
- Ao no Exorcist – Blue Night Fes DVD
- "Hate Raji Mezase Hanazono ! Zenkoku hen" (はてラジめざせ花園!全国編) DVD
- "Tetsuya Kakihara & Toshiyuki Morikawa's Brave 10 on the radio DVD" – Vol. 1–5
- "Tetsuya Kakihara & Yuki Ono's Tottemo Tanoshin jai mashita! (柿原徹也と小野友樹が、とっても楽しんじゃいました!) DVD"
- "Kiramune Music Festival 2010 Live" DVD
- "Kiramune Music Festival 2012 Live" DVD
- "Kiramune Music Festival 2013 Live" DVD
- "Kiramune Music Festival 2014 Live" DVD
- "Kiramune Music Festival 2015 Live" DVD
- "Love Root Zero – Koigokoro Saku Hana" (ラブルートゼロ コイゴコロ咲く花) DVD
- "Otomate Party 2009" DVD
- "Otomate Party 2010" DVD
- "Otomate Party 2012" DVD
- "Otomate Party 2013" DVD
- "Otomate Party 2014" DVD
- "Otomate Party 2015" DVD
- "Sengoku Paradise Kiwami" Vol.1 DVD – special content – Daisuke Namikawa and Tetsuya Kakihara's Sekigahara Chin Dochu
- Tengen Toppa Gurren Lagann Movie Zenyasai DVD
- "Tokimeki Recipe – Spain Ryori no Maki – Tetsuya Kakihara & Takuya Eguchi" DVD

== Magazines / idol visual books ==
- Seiyu Paradise vol.9 – 2012 – About Kakihara's new album Continuous
- Pick-up Voice vol. 51 March 2012 issue
- Seiyu Grand Prix March 2012 issue – About Behind-the-scenes with shooting of CD cover art of Kakihara's Continuous album
- Seiyu Animedia March 2012 issue
- Comic Gene March 2012 issue – Brave 10 Anime Interview with Tetsuya Kakihara
- TV Station 14 March 2012 issue – Ozuma Anime Interview with Tetsuya Kakihara
- Kiramune Music Festival Official Pamphlet – Released: March 2012
- Kiramune Special Book Kiramune's music label company 3rd year anniversary publication Tetsuya Kakihara – Released: April 2012
