= List of Saekano volumes =

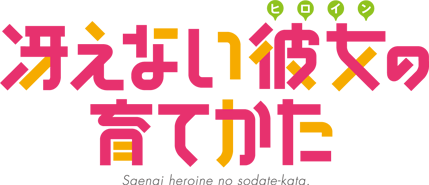
Official logo of Saekano: How to Raise a Boring Girlfriend

Saekano: How to Raise a Boring Girlfriend is a Japanese light novel series by Fumiaki Maruto, with illustrations by Kurehito Misaki. The first light novel volume was published by Fujimi Shobo under their Fujimi Fantasia Bunko imprint on July 20, 2012. As of November 2018, thirteen volumes and two short story collections have been published. In the twelfth volume, Maruto announced that the series would end in the thirteenth volume, which was released on October 20, 2017. A spin-off light novel titled Saenai Heroine no Sodatekata: Girls Side was published in three volumes from February 2015 to June 2017. Another spin-off novel titled Saenai Heroine no Sodatekata: Memorial was published in two volumes from March 2018 to November 2019.

A manga adaptation with art by Takeshi Moriki was serialized from January 9, 2013, to August 9, 2016, in Fujimi Shobo's shōnen manga magazine Monthly Dragon Age. It has been collected in eight tankōbon volumes between August 2013 and November 2016. It has also been published in English by Yen Press between January 2016 and December 2017.

A spin-off manga titled Saenai Heroine no Sodatekata: Egoistic-Lily with art by Niito was serialized from February 4, 2013, to May 2, 2014, in Kadokawa Shoten's seinen manga magazine Young Ace. It has been collected in three tankōbon volumes. Another spin-off manga titled Saenai Heroine no Sodatekata: Koisuru Metronome with art by Sabu Musha was serialized from August 24, 2013, to April 25, 2018, in Square Enix's seinen manga magazine Big Gangan. It was collected in ten tankōbon volumes. A manga adaptation of Saenai Heroine no Sodatekata: Girls Side was serialized in Fujimi Shobo's Monthly Dragon Age magazine from September 9, 2016, to June 9, 2017. It was collected in two tankōbon volumes.

== Light novels ==
=== Saenai Heroine no Sodatekata ===
No.	Release date	ISBN
1	July 20, 2012	978-4-04-071078-5
2	November 20, 2012	978-4-04-071081-5
3	March 19, 2013	978-4-8291-3875-5
4	July 20, 2013	978-4-8291-3917-2
5	November 20, 2013	978-4-04-712956-6
6	April 19, 2014	978-4-04-070096-0
7	December 20, 2014	978-4-04-070425-8
8	June 20, 2015	978-4-04-070426-5
9	November 20, 2015	978-4-04-070743-3
10	July 20, 2016	978-4-04-070742-6
11	November 19, 2016	978-4-04-072076-0
12	March 18, 2017	978-4-04-072077-7
13	October 20, 2017	978-4-04-072339-6

==== Saenai Heroine no Sodatekata FD ====
Two light novels titled Saenai Heroine no Sodatekata FD (short for Fan Disc) were published featuring more side stories.

No.	Release date	ISBN
FD	August 20, 2014	978-4-04-070282-7
FD2	November 20, 2018	978-4-04-072944-2

=== Saenai Heroine no Sodatekata: Girls Side ===
No.	Release date	ISBN
1	February 20, 2015	978-4-04-070520-0
2	March 19, 2016	978-4-04-070840-9
3	June 20, 2017	978-4-04-072338-9

=== Saenai Heroine no Sodatekata: Memorial ===
No.	Release date	ISBN
1	March 20, 2018	978-4-04-072460-7
2	November 20, 2019	978-4-04-073402-6

== Manga ==
=== How to Raise a Boring Girlfriend ===
No.	Original release date	Original ISBN	English release date	English ISBN
1	August 9, 2013	978-4-04-712893-4	January 26, 2016	978-0-31-626919-3
Chapter 1-5
2	April 9, 2014	978-4-04-070081-6	April 6, 2016	978-0-31-631078-9
Chapter 6-10
3	September 9, 2014	978-4-04-070340-4	July 26, 2016	978-0-31-631081-9
Chapter 11-16
4	January 9, 2015	978-4-04-070341-1	November 22, 2016	978-0-31-631085-7
Chapter 17-21
5	June 9, 2015	978-4-04-070598-9	March 28, 2017	978-0-31-631647-7
Chapter 22-26; TV Anime Adaptation Celebration Comic
6	December 5, 2015	978-4-04-070599-6	June 20, 2017	978-0-31-639911-1
Chapter 27-32
7	June 9, 2016	978-4-04-070914-7	September 19, 2017	978-0-31-655314-8
Chapter 33-37; TV Anime Adaptation Second Season Celebration Comic
8	November 19, 2016	978-4-04-072080-7	December 12, 2017	978-0-31-647236-4
Chapter 38-42; TV Anime Adaptation Second Season Celebration Comic 2

=== Saenai Heroine no Sodatekata: Egoistic-Lily ===
No.	Japanese release date	Japanese ISBN
1	July 2, 2013	978-4-04-120784-0
1. Unmei no Deai, Okinai Ibento (運命の出逢い、起きないイベント); 2. Saeteru Kanojo no Sono Shōtai (冴えてる彼女のその正体); 3. egoistic-lily; 4. Oretachi no Tatakai wa Kore Karanda... tte Ittara Owatchau (俺たちの戦いはこれからだ…って言ったら終わっちゃう); 5. Rūto Bunki wa Totsuzen ni (ルート分岐は突然に)
2	December 4, 2013	978-4-04-120999-8
6. Rūto Kakuteigo Nanoni, Soku Shuraba (Chū: Genkōteki na Imi de) (ルート確定後なのに、即修羅場（注：原稿的な意味で）); 7. Haru, Sore wa Deai no Kisetsu (Chū: Ima wa Natsu desu) (春、それは出逢いの季節（注：今は夏です）); 8. Arashi o Yobu Saikai (Chū: Ima wa Kaisei desu) (嵐を呼ぶ再会（注：今は快晴です）); 9. Dōjin Sakkanara Ichido wa Kō Iu Yumemiru yo ne? (同人作家なら一度はこういう夢見るよね？); 10. Futsukame, Shūryō (二日目、終了)
3	June 4, 2014	978-4-04-121089-5
11. Hai, Mata Shujinkō o Hetare Sasemashita. (はい、また主人公をヘタレさせました。); 12. Saenai Hīrō no Sodatekata (冴えないヒーローの育てかた); 13. Eriri Supesharu Ibento (英梨々・スペシャルイベント); 14. Nakanaori, Enki. (仲直り、延期。); 15. Dokanai Kobinai Kaeriminai Kanojo no Taoshikata (退かない媚びない省みない彼女の倒しかた)

=== Saenai Heroine no Sodatekata: Koisuru Metronome ===
No.	Japanese release date	Japanese ISBN
1	April 19, 2014	978-4-75-754296-9
1. Nemutai Kanojo no Ayashikata (眠たい彼女のあやしかた); 2. Henshū to Kanojo no Shuzai no Shikata (編集と彼女の取材のしかた); 3. Kakanai Sakka no Okoshikata (書かない作家の起こしかた); 4. Mienai Kotoba no Hiroikata (見えない言葉の拾いかた); 5. Kienai Kako e no Modorikata (消えない過去への戻りかた)
2	August 20, 2014	978-4-75-754402-4
6. Nayameru Kanojo no Oshi Taoshikata (悩める彼女の押し倒しかた); 7. Egaita Yume no Kanaekata (1) (描いた夢の叶えかた（１）); 8. Egaita Yume no Kanaekata (2) (描いた夢の叶えかた（２）); 9. Egaita Yume no Kanaekata (3) (描いた夢の叶えかた（３）); 10. Egaita Yume no Kanaekata (4) (描いた夢の叶えかた（４）); 11. Sekai no Chōwa no Kuzushikata (世界の調和の崩しかた)
3	December 20, 2014	978-4-75-754520-5
12. Ochinai Eshi no Otoshikata (1) (おちない絵師のおとしかた（１）); 13. Ochinai Eshi no Otoshikata (2) (おちない絵師のおとしかた（２）); 14. Ochinai Eshi no Otoshikata (3) (おちない絵師のおとしかた（３）); 15. Fukigen na Kanojo no Nadamekata (不機嫌な彼女のなだめかた); 16. Kakushita Kimochi no Sagurikata (隠した気持ちの探りかた)
4	June 20, 2015	978-4-75-754664-6
17. Narenai Fuyu no Sasoikata (慣れない冬の誘いかた); 18. Mienai Kiseki no Tadorikata (見えない軌跡の辿りかた); 19. Saenai Yonjūyon-kame no Sugoshikata (冴えない４４日目の過ごしかた); 20. Megenai Sakka no Semarikata (めげない作家の迫りかた); 21. Megenai Tantō Henshū no Kotaekata (めげない担当編集の応えかた)
5	December 25, 2015	978-4-75-754847-3
22. Mokuhi to Risō no Tsuranukikata (黙秘と理想の貫きかた); 23. Tadashī Anime no Tsukurikata (正しいアニメのつくりかた); 24. Mienai Honne no Sasshikata (見えない本音の察しかた); 25. Noranai Sakka no Furimukasekata (Zenpen) (ノらない作家の振り向かせかた（前編）); 26. Noranai Sakka no Furimukasekata (Kōhen) (ノらない作家の振り向かせかた（後編）)
6	July 19, 2016	978-4-75-755063-6
27. Notteru Sakka no Senaka no Oshikata (ノッてる作家の背中の押しかた); 28. Sakka to Sakuhin no Izanaikata (Zenpen) (作家と作品の誘いかた（前編）); 29. Sakka to Sakuhin no Izanaikata (Kōhen) (作家と作品の誘いかた（後編）); 30. Shigoto to Shumi no Kirikaekata (Zenpen) (仕事と趣味の切り替えかた（前編）); 31. Shigoto to Shumi no Kirikaekata (Kōhen) (仕事と趣味の切り替えかた（後編）)
7	March 18, 2017	978-4-75-755296-8
32. Sagano Fumio no Kotaekata (嵯峨野文雄の応えかた); 33. Takamaru Kikaku no Susumekata (高まる企画の進めかた); 34. Mukiyō na Kimi no Ayamarikata (無器用な君の謝りかた); 35. Tayoreru Jōshi no Osamekata (頼れる上司の収めかた); 36. Yuruganu Ketsui no Shimeshikata (揺るがぬ決意の示しかた)
8	June 20, 2017	978-4-75-755398-9
37. Kakenai Kimochi no Okoshikata (書けない気持ちの起こしかた); 38. Ano Hi no Keshiki no Utsushikata (あの日の景色のうつしかた); 39. Mirai no Michi no Sadamekata (未来の道の定めかた); 40. Matteta Ano Hi no Hajimekata (待ってたあの日の始めかた); 41. Anata no Mirai no Erabikata (あなたの未来の選びかた)
9	December 25, 2017	978-4-75-755563-1
42. Kyanpasu Raifu no Egakikata (キャンパスライフの描きかた); 43. Saenai Shinnyūsei no Sugoshikata (冴えない新入生の過ごしかた); 44. Kanaeta Yume no Mitsumekata (叶えた夢の見つめかた); 45. Yoenai Otona no Shigoto no Shikata (酔えない大人の仕事のしかた); 46. Kizuita Kibō no Kuzushikata (築いた希望の崩しかた)
10	June 25, 2018	978-4-75-755729-1
47. Watashi no Inai Monogatari no Susumekata (私の居ない物語の進めかた); 48. Kore Kara Saki e no Idomikata (これから先への挑みかた); 49. Oenai Kanojo no Mukiaikata (追えない彼女の向き合いかた); 50. Tomedonai Ai no Uketorikata (止め処ない愛の受け取りかた); 51. Atarashī Asa no Mukaekata (新しい朝の迎えかた)

=== Saenai Heroine no Sodatekata: Girls Side ===
No.	Japanese release date	Japanese ISBN
1	April 8, 2017	978-4-04-072210-8
Chapter 1-6
2	July 7, 2017	978-4-04-072350-1
Chapter 7-11
