= String of Pain =

Single by Tetsuya Kakihara 柿原徹也
- Released: February 6, 2013
- Recorded: 2013
- Genre: J-pop
- Label: Kiramune

Tetsuya Kakihara 柿原徹也 singles chronology
"String of Pain" (2013)	"GENERATIONS" (2013)

"String of Pain" is the first single by Japanese voice actor Tetsuya Kakihara, released on February 6, 2013. The title song was used in the ending theme for anime 八犬伝―東方八犬異聞― (Hakkenden: Eight Dogs of the East) in which Tetsuya Kakihara also voices the main character of Shino Inuzuka

== Track listing ==
No.	Title	Writer(s)	Length
1.	"String of Pain"		4:25
2.	"運命の引力 (Unmei no Inryoku)"	宮崎 誠 (Miyazaki Makoto)	5:11
3.	"String of Pain" (Off Vocal)
4.	"運命の引力 (Unmei no Inryoku)" (Off Vocal)
