= Chinatsu Akasaki =

Japanese voice actress

- 赤﨑 千夏
- Born: August 10, 1987 (age 39); Chiran, Kagoshima, Japan
- Education: Tokyo Gakugei University
- Occupation: Voice actress
- Years active: 2008–present
- Agent: 81 Produce
- Height: 161.4 cm (5 ft 4 in)
- Children: 2

Chinatsu Akasaki (赤﨑 千夏, Akasaki Chinatsu; born August 10, 1987) is a Japanese voice actress affiliated with 81 Produce. She voiced Falulu and Chanko in PriPara.

== Early life ==
Akasaki graduated from Kagoshima Prefectural Kinkōwan High School. She aspired to be a voice actress since the fifth and sixth grade. In junior high school, she belonged to the basketball club and the broadcasting club. At Kinkōwan High School, she belonged to the local civic troupe "Ibuki", because there was no club drama in high school.

After graduating high school, she entered Tokyo Gakugei University. She studied Italian as a second foreign language.

== Career ==
Akasaki won the Nippon Cultural Broadcasting Award, 81 Produce Award, and Alchemist Award on Voice Newtype Summer Audition.

In October 2008, she went to 81 Actor's Studio as an award privilege of 81 Produce Award. She graduated from training school in October 2009 and became a member of 81 Produce in April 2010.

== Personal life ==
Akasaki officially announced her marriage on her Twitter account. She had a first son on August 10, 2020. She had a second son on September 30, 2023.

== Filmography ==
=== Television animation ===
2010
- Shimajirō HESOKA – Nacchi

2011

- Shimajirō HESOKA – Ms. Shikako
- Sacred Seven – Nanami Akasaki
- Wandering Son – Tsuchiya
- Mashiroiro Symphony – Itsuki Asakura

2012

- Smile PreCure! – Haru Midorikawa, Runa Terada
- Senki Zesshō Symphogear – Yumi Itaba
- High School DxD – Ile and Nel
- Bodacious Space Pirates – Maki Harada
- Lagrange: The Flower of Rin-ne – Kokoro Sagishima, Chiharu Arisato, Yuria Sogabe, Nami Senjō
- Love, Chunibyo & Other Delusions – Shinka Nibutani

2013

- Oreshura – Chiwa Harusaki
- A Certain Scientific Railgun S – Saiai Kinuhata
- Love Lab – Natsuo Maki
- Fantasista Doll – Shimeji
- Pocket Monsters: XY – Joy, Satoshi's Numera/Numeil, Citron's Horubee
- Gingitsune – Yumi Ikegami

2014

- Kill Me Baby – Yasuna Oribe
- Love, Chunibyo & Other Delusions -Heart Throb- – Shinka Nibutani
- Selector Infected WIXOSS – Akira Aoi
- Himegoto – Kaguya Arikawa
- Gonna be the Twin-Tail!! – Erina Shindō
- PriPara – Falulu, Chanko
- Trinity Seven – Ilia

2015

- Food Wars: Shokugeki no Soma – Alice Nakiri
- Is It Wrong to Try to Pick Up Girls in a Dungeon? – Mikoto Yamato
- Chivalry of a Failed Knight - Tsukuyomi Sisters
- Plastic Memories – Michiru Kinushima
- Pocket Monsters: XY&Z – Joy, Citron's Bunnelby
- Saekano: How to Raise a Boring Girlfriend – Izumi Hashima
- The Idolmaster Cinderella Girls – Akane Hino
- The Asterisk War – Ernesta Kuhne
- Utawarerumono: The False Faces – Anju

2016

- Erased – Airi Katagiri
- Food Wars! Shokugeki no Souma: The Second Plate – Alice Nakiri
- Hybrid x Heart Magias Academy Ataraxia – Yuricia Farandole
- Re:Zero − Starting Life in Another World – Felt

2017

- Fate/Apocrypha – Fiore Forvedge Yggdmillennia
- In Another World with My Smartphone – Yae Kokonoe
- Welcome to the Ballroom — Chinatsu Hiyama
- Food Wars! Shokugeki no Soma: The Third Plate – Alice Nakiri
- Little Witch Academia – Barbara Parker

2018

- Dagashi Kashi 2 – Hajime Owari
- Food Wars! Shokugeki no Souma: The Third Plate Tootsuki Ressha-ren - Alice Nakiri
- Killing Bites – Mai Shinozaki
- Sword Art Online Alternative Gun Gale Online – Miyu Shinohara/Fukaziroh
- My Sister, My Writer – Ahegao W Peace Sensei
- A Certain Magical Index III – Saiai Kinuhata

2019

- Boogiepop and Others – Hinako
- Isekai Quartet – Felt
- Granbelm – Rosa
- Wasteful Days of High School Girls – Nozomu "Baka" Tanaka
- Is It Wrong to Try to Pick Up Girls in a Dungeon? II – Mikoto Yamato
- Outburst Dreamer Boys – Mizuki Hijiri
- Bakugan: Battle Planet – Lia Venegas
- Fruits Basket – Mitsuru (Mit-chan)

2020

- A Certain Scientific Railgun T – Saiai Kinuhata
- A Destructive God Sits Next to Me – Cerberus
- Drifting Dragons – Mayne
- Jujutsu Kaisen – Kasumi Miwa
- Bakugan: Armored Alliance – Lia Venegas

2021

- How Not to Summon a Demon Lord Ω – Fanis Laminitus
- Scarlet Nexus – Luka Travers
- Remake Our Life! – Sayuri Jishoji
- Fushigi Dagashiya Zenitendō – Yōko Segawa

2022

- Utawarerumono: Mask of Truth – Anju

2023

- In Another World with My Smartphone 2nd Season – Yae Kokonoe
- My Unique Skill Makes Me OP Even at Level 1 – Lil
- Jujutsu Kaisen Season 2 – Kasumi Miwa

2024

- Unnamed Memory – Meredina
- My Deer Friend Nokotan – Chiharu Tsubameya
- Delico's Nursery – Kiki
- Tōhai – Yū Katsuragi

2026

- A Certain Dark Item – Saiai Kinuhata
- Nippon Sangoku – Hina Hiraizumi

=== Original video animation ===
- Nana to Kaoru – Yukari Mutsuki
- KonoSuba Season 2 OVA – Ran
- Thus Spoke Kishibe Rohan Episode 9: The Run – Mika Hayamura
- Little Witch Academia – Barbara Parker

=== Original net animation ===
- Star Wars: Visions - The Ninth Jedi – Lah Kara
- Star Wars: Visions Presents – The Ninth Jedi - Lah Kara

=== Anime film ===
- Takanashi Rikka Kai: Gekijō-ban Chūnibyō Demo Koi ga Shitai! (2013) as Shinka Nibutani
- PriPara: Everyone, Assemble! Prism☆Tours (2015) as Falulu
- Little Witch Academia: The Enchanted Parade (2015) as Barbara Parker
- PriPara Mi~nna no Akogare Let's Go PriPari (2016) as Falulu, Chanko
- Accel World: Infinite Burst (2016) as Risa Tsukiori
- PriPara: Everyone Shine! Sparkling☆Star Live (2017) as Falulu, Chanko
- Love, Chunibyo & Other Delusions! Take on Me (2018) as Shinka Nibutani
- Saekano the Movie: Finale (2019) as Izumi Hashima
- Jujutsu Kaisen 0 (2021) as Kasumi Miwa
- The Orbital Children (2022) as Miina Misasa
- Aikatsu! × PriPara: The Movie Deai no Kiseki! (2025) as Falulu

=== Audio drama ===
- Watashi ga Motete Dōsunda (2015) – Shima Nishina

=== Video games ===
- Genso Suikoden: Tsumugareshi Hyakunen no Toki – Efil, Nima
- When Cicadas Cry Bonds: Kizuna – Lune-Oak
- Girl Friend Beta – Akari Amari
- Utawarerumono: Itsuwari no Kamen (2015) – Anju
- Sword Art Online: Lost Song (2015) – Lux
- MeiQ: Labyrinth of Death (2015) – Sethia
- Granblue Fantasy (2015) – Arriet
- THE iDOLM@STER Cinderella Girls: Starlight Stage (2015) – Akane Hino
- JoJo's Bizarre Adventure: Eyes of Heaven (2015) – Yukako Yamagishi
- Kantai Collection (2016) – Zara, Pola, and Aquila
- Utawarerumono: Futari no Hakuoro (2016) – Anju
- Little Witch Academia: Chamber of Time (2017) – Barbara Parker
- Kirara Fantasia (2017) – Cesame
- Xenoblade Chronicles 2 (2017) – Kora
- Accel World vs. Sword Art Online (2017) – Risa Tsukiori, Lux
- Soulcalibur VI (2018) – Seong Mi-na
- Honkai: Star Rail (2023) – Asta
- Takt Op. Symphony (2023) – L'Arlésienne
- Wuthering Waves (2026) – Sigrika
- Zenless Zone Zero (2026) – Roxy

=== Dubbing ===
- High Guardian Spice – Rosemary
