= Kiyono Yasuno =

Japanese voice actress and singer

- 安野 希世乃
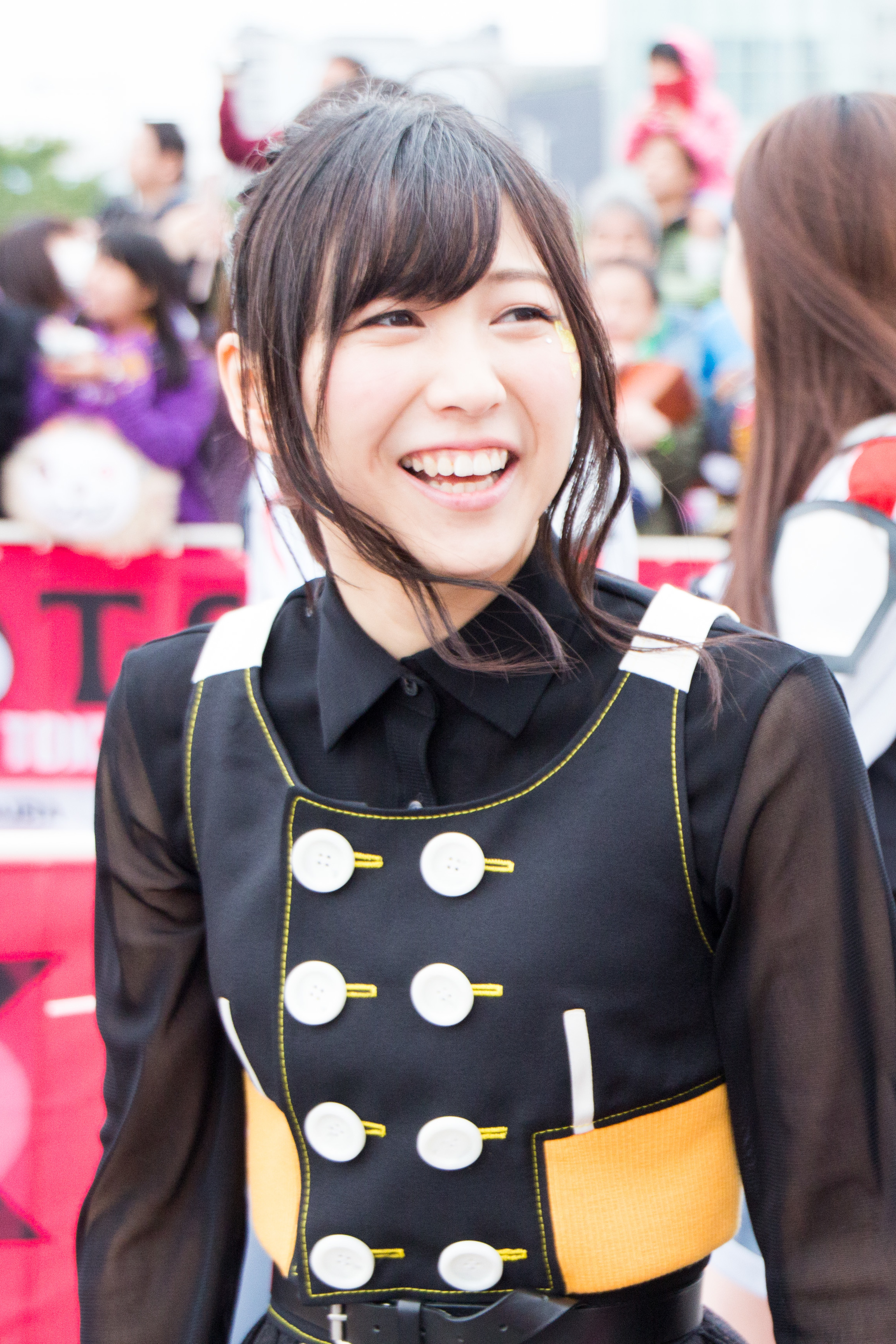
- Yasuno at T-SPOOK 2016
- Born: July 9, 1989 (age 37); Miyagi Prefecture, Japan
- Occupations: Voice actress; singer
- Years active: 2009–present
- Agent(s): Avex Planning and Development
- Height: 157 cm (5 ft 2 in)

Kiyono Yasuno (安野 希世乃, Yasuno Kiyono; born July 9, 1989) is a Japanese voice actress and singer. She attended voice actor training classes of the Avex Artist Academy before becoming affiliated with Avex Planning and Development. She is known for her role as Megumi Katō in the anime series Saekano: How to Raise a Boring Girlfriend. In 2016, she became part of the musical unit Walküre, which performs songs for the anime series Macross Delta. She made her music debut in 2017 with the release of the mini-album Namida (涙。). She is also known as Kiyono Mezawa (目澤 希世乃, Mezawa Kiyono).

== Biography ==
Yasuno was born in Miyagi Prefecture on July 9, 1989. About a week after she was born, her family moved to Hakodate, and after some time they moved back to Miyagi Prefecture. From an early age, she had an interest in anime, particularly after watching Sailor Moon and Magic Knight Rayearth as a child. She became aware of voice acting at a young age, while watching the anime series Saint Tail. To further her interest, she watched videos of dubs being recorded.

During her sixth year of elementary school, Yasuno moved to Tokyo. In high school, she became part of her school's theater club. Although she had been looking for a voice acting school, her parents told her that they would allow her to pursue a voice acting career only if she paid with her own money. Around that time, the talent agency Avex was holding auditions for its voice acting school, so she decided to apply. She passed the audition and began attending voice acting school. She played a number of background roles in anime beginning in 2009, and in 2011 played her first lead role as Kizuna Todoroki, the protagonist of the anime Kizuna Ichigake, which was produced as part of the Young Animator Training Project.

Yasuno continued voicing primarily supporting roles until 2013, when she was cast as the character Sakura Kitaōji in the multimedia franchise Aikatsu! The following year, she played the roles of Tina Kobayakawa in Wake Up, Girls! and Yuko Tachikawa in Parasyte. In 2015, she was cast as Megumi Katō, the main heroine of the anime series Saekano: How to Raise a Boring Girlfriend. That year, she also voiced Kaori Murasaki in Triage X and Mayuko Inoue in Ushio and Tora. In 2015, she joined the popular idol multimedia franchise The Idolmaster, taking on the role of The Idolmaster Cinderella Girls character Natsuki Kimura and has attended many of the franchise's live concerts to represent the character.

In 2016, Yasuno became part of the musical unit Walküre, which performed songs in the anime series Macross Delta; she also played the role of Kaname Buccaneer in the series. She also played the roles of Cordelia Kasukami in Twin Star Exorcists, Botan Kumegawa in Anne Happy, and Gretel Jeckeln in Schwarzesmarken. In 2017, she released her first mini-album Namida (涙。) under the FlyingDog label; the mini-album includes the song "Chiisana Hitotsubu" (A Small Grain), which was used as the closing theme to the anime series Restaurant to Another World. She made appearances at Anime Festival Asia Singapore in November 2017 and C3 AFA Hong Kong in February 2018. She made an appearance at Anime North in Toronto on May 25, 2018 to May 27, 2018 where she held a signing session as well as a Q&A panel.

== Filmography ==
=== Television animation ===
2009

- Fight Ippatsu! Jūden-chan!!, Friend B

2010

- Chu-Bra!!, Itagaki, Female student

2011

- Un-Go, An Osada
- Chihayafuru, Rika Mashima
- No. 6, Safu
- Pokémon: Black & White, Rina

2012

- Aquarion Evol, Shushu
- Nakaimo - My Sister Is Among Them!, Friend
- Soreike! Anpanman, Aoenpitsuman, Mizu no Ko B
- High School DxD, Meguri
- Bodacious Space Pirates, Asta Alhanko

2013

- Aikatsu!, Sakura Kitaōji, Shizuku Hosaka
- Valvrave the Liberator, Iori Kitagawa
- Oshiri Kajiri Mushi, Nise Kajiri, Z mother, Health room teacher
- The Severing Crime Edge, Kashiko Misumi
- Soreike! Anpanman, Yukidaruman, Girl, Sakuranbo A
- Chihayafuru 2, Hinako Mano, Megumi Mayama
- Da Capo III, Nomiya Ebisu
- Valvrave the Liberator 2nd Season, Iori Kitagawa
- Pokémon: XY, Cosette
- Pocket Monsters: Best Wishes! Season 2: Decolora Adventure, Ayumi

2014

- Wake Up, Girls!, Tina Kobayakawa
- When Supernatural Battles Became Commonplace, Assistant
- Parasyte, Yuko Tachikawa
- Monthly Girls' Nozaki-kun, Heroine, Schoolgirl, Clerk
- Pokémon: XY, Espurr, Pichu
- Hamatora: the Animation, Koneko
- Yo-Kai Watch, Chi-chan, Matenshi
- Re:_Hamatora, Koneko

2015

- Danchi Tomoo, Yūko
- Saekano: How to Raise a Boring Girlfriend, Megumi Katō
- PriPara, Anko
- Show by Rock!!, Wendy
- Triage X, Kaori Murasaki
- Ushio and Tora, Mayuko Inoue
- Gatchaman Crowds insight, Erina Kido, Housewife
- The Idolmaster Cinderella Girls 2nd Season, Natsuki Kimura

2016

- Schwarzesmarken, Gretel Jeckeln
- Anne Happy, Botan Kumegawa
- Macross Delta, Kaname Buccaneer
- Twin Star Exorcists, Cordelia Kasukami

2017

- Saekano: How to Raise a Boring Girlfriend Flat, Megumi Kato
- Restaurant to Another World, Sarah Gold
- Kirakira PreCure a la Mode, Lumière
- Black Clover, Charmy Pappitson

2018

- Death March to the Parallel World Rhapsody, Nana
- Overlord II, Princess Renner
- My Hero Academia, Nejire Hado

2019

- Saekano the Movie: Finale, Megumi Kato
- Star☆Twinkle PreCure, Elena Amamiya / Cure Soleil
- Are You Lost?, Mutsu Amatani
- Didn't I Say to Make My Abilities Average in the Next Life?!, Monika

2020

- Kakushigoto, Rasuna Sumita
- Arte, Dacha

2021

- Dragon Quest: The Adventure of Dai, Marin
- Edens Zero, Witch Regret
- The Aquatope on White Sand, Akari Maeda
- "Deji" Meets Girl, Maise Higa
- Restaurant to Another World 2, Sarah Gold

2022

- Slow Loop, Tora Yoshinaga
- Orient, Michiru Saruwatari
- Arknights: Prelude to Dawn, Hoshiguma

2024

- My Instant Death Ability Is So Overpowered, Ryōko Ninomiya
- Murder Mystery of the Dead, Yū Kodama

2025

- Flower and Asura, Ryōko Totonoi
- Aquarion: Myth of Emotions, Kyōko Munakata
- Catch Me at the Ballpark!, Nagisa

=== Theatrical animation ===
- Kizuna Ichigeki (2011), Kizuna Todoroki
- Aikatsu! (2014), Sakura Kitaōji
- Bodacious Space Pirates: Abyss of Hyperspace (2014), Asta Alhanko
- Wake Up, Girls! – Seven Idols (2014), Tina Kobayakawa
- Macross Delta: Gekijou no Walküre (2018), Kaname Buccaneer
- Saekano the Movie: Finale (2019), Megumi Katō
- PreCure Miracle Universe (2019), Erena Amamiya / Cure Soleil
- Aria the Crepusculo (2021), Aletta

=== Video games ===
- The Idolmaster Cinderella Girls Starlight Stage (2015-current), Natsuki Kimura
- Granblue Fantasy (2016), Pamela
- Uta Macross Sma-Pho De-Culture (2017), Kaname Buccaneer
- Food Fantasy (2018), Pineapple Bun, Bird's Nest Soup
- Azur Lane (2019), IJN Azuma
- My Hero: One's Justice 2 (2020), Nejire Hado
- Arknights (2020), Hoshiguma
- Lord of Heroes (2020), Baretta
- Wing of Darkness (2021), Klara
- Echoes of Mana (2022), Sierra
- Path to Nowhere (2022), Labyrinth
- Zenless Zone Zero (2025), Seed
- Honkai: Star Rail (2026), Pearl

=== Dubbing ===
- Pac-Man and the Ghostly Adventures, Pinky, Braces Strictler
- Surf's Up 2: WaveMania, Lani Aliikai

== Discography ==
=== Mini album ===
Release date	Title	Package number
July 27, 2017	"Namida." (涙。)	VTCL-60451 (Normal Edition) VTZL-127 (Limited Edition with DVD)
November 7, 2018	"Egao." (笑顔。)	VTCL-60476 (Normal Edition) VTZL-148 (Limited Edition with BD)
September 4, 2019	"Okaeri" (おかえり。)	VTCL-60504 (Normal Edition) VTZL-160 (Limited Edition A with DVD and Acoustic Live) VTCL-60502~3 (Limited Edition B with Acoustic Live)

=== Single ===
Release date	Title	Package number
Apr 25, 2018	"Rocket Beat" (ロケットビート)	VTCL-35274
Apr 29, 2020	"Hare Moyou" (晴れ模様)	VTCL-35314 (Normal Edition) VTZL-172 (Limited Edition with BD)
Mar 3, 2021	"felicita/echoes" (フェリチータ/echoes)	VTCL-35325 (ARIA EDITION) VTCL-35326 (KIYONO EDITION])
