= Generations (song) =

"GENERATIONS"

Song by Tetsuya Kakihara 柿原徹也
- Language: Japanese
- Released: September 18, 2013
- Recorded: 2013
- Genre: J-pop
- Label: Kiramune

Tetsuya Kakihara 柿原徹也 singles chronology
"String of Pain" (2013)	"GENERATIONS" (2013)	"Saichaina 咲いちゃいな" (2015)

Singles from Tetsuya Kakihara 柿原徹也
- 1. "GENERATIONS"

"Generations" is the second single by Japanese voice actor Tetsuya Kakihara. It was released under Kiramune on September 18, 2013.

== Single recording content ==
CD Single
No.	Title	Lyrics	Music	Arranger	Length
1.	"GENERATIONS"	Miyazaki Makoto	Miyazaki Makoto	Miyazaki Makoto	4:09
2.	"U R my Sunshine!"	Kohei by SIMONSAYZ	Kohei by SIMONSAYZ	Kohei by SIMONSAYZ	4:22
3.	"ラプソディー (Rhapsody)"	Kyasu Morizuki	Katsumi Ohnishi	Katsumi Ohnishi	4:03
Total length:					12:34

DVD（Deluxe Edition Only）
No.	Title	Length
1.	"GENERATIONS (MUSIC CLIP)"
2.	"TRAILER"
