= Miku Sawai =

Japanese musician from Osaka (born 1993)

- 沢井 美空
- Born: September 16, 1993 (age 32); Osaka
- Occupation: Singer-songwriter
- Years active: 2011–present
- Website: http://www.mikuweb.com

Miku Sawai (沢井 美空, Sawai Miku; born September 16, 1993) is a Japanese musician from Osaka who is signed to Sony Music Entertainment Japan. She made her debut as a professional artist in 2011 with the release of her first single "Atashi, Kyō, Shitsuren Shimashita". Her music has been used as theme songs to various anime television series such as Kimi to Boku, Kill la Kill, Akame ga Kill, and Saekano: How to Raise a Boring Girlfriend.

== Biography ==
Sawai was born in Osaka on September 16, 1993. She wrote several poems for school beginning in her elementary years, but after becoming a fan of the singer Yui in her junior high school years, she decided to become a singer-songwriter. She auditioned with Sony Music Entertainment Japan in 2009, which lead to her being called to Tokyo. She recorded four songs at their studio and was offered a contract, while she was still studying in high school. She made her major debut in 2011 with the release of her first single "Atashi, Kyō, Shitsuren Shimashita" (あたし、今日、失恋しました。) on May 11, 2011; the single charted at 110 on the Oricon weekly charts. Due to her work as a singer, she had to transfer to a high school in Tokyo in order to continue her studies. She released her second single "Nakimushi" (なきむし。) on November 16, 2011; the single's title track was used as the ending theme to the 2011 anime television series Kimi to Boku.

In 2012 she released two singles: "Sotsugyō Memories (Sayonara, Anata)" (卒業メモリーズ〜サヨナラ、あなた。〜, Sotsugyō memorīzu 〜sayonara, anata.〜) and "Yubiwa (Atashi, Kyō, Kekko Shimasu)" (指輪〜あたし、今日、結婚します。〜, Yubiwa 〜atashi, kyō, kekkon shimasu.〜).

She released her first album Sentimental on June 5, 2013. She then released the single "Gomen ne Iiko ja Irarenai" (ごめんね、いいコじゃいられない。, Sorry, I Can't Be a Good Girl Any Longer.), whose title track was used as the first ending theme to the 2013 anime television series Kill la Kill; the single peaked at 37 on the Oricon weekly charts. She released the single "Konna Sekai, Shiritakunakatta." (こんな世界、知りたくなかった。, This World, I Didn't Want to Know.) on August 13, 2014, whose title track is used as the first ending theme to the anime television series Akame ga Kill!. She released the single "Colorful." (カラフル。, Karafuru.) on January 28, 2015; the title track is used as the ending theme to the anime television series Saekano: How to Raise a Boring Girlfriend.

On March 25, 2015, she released her second album" Yuuutsu Biyori" (憂鬱日和。, Melancholy Weather.). Later, on March 2, 2016, she released the single "Wake Me Up"; the title song was used as theme song for Sugoi Japan Award 2016, while the second track of the song "Tsukiakari" (ツキアカリ) is a self-cover of a song she originally wrote for Sora Amamiya second single.

== Discography ==
=== Studio albums ===
Title	Details	Peak Chart Positions
Title	Details	Oricon
センチメンタル。 (Sentimental)	Released: June 5, 2013; Label: Mastersix Foundation; Formats: CD, digital download	185
憂鬱日和。 (Days of Depression)	Released: March 25, 2015; Label: Mastersix Foundation; Formats: CD, digital download	198
