= Sengoku Paradise =

Japanese anime and mobile game

戦国☆パラダイス
- Genre: Action, Comedy, Drama, Historical, Romance, Samurai
- Video game
- Anime television series

Sengoku Paradise Kiwami
- Directed by: Katsuya Kikuchi
- Produced by: Guiya Ōta
- Music by: Dice Creative; Takashi Abe el
- Studio: Milky Cartoon
- Original network: TV Tokyo
- Original run: October 3, 2011 – March 26, 2012
- Episodes: 26

Sengoku Paradise (戦国☆パラダイス) is a Japanese mobile game. It was adapted into an anime television series by Milky Cartoon and TV Tokyo in 2011.
