= Saekano =

Japanese light novel series

- Saekano: How to Raise a Boring Girlfriend
- The cover for the first light novel volume featuring Eriri Spencer Sawamura

冴えない彼女(ヒロイン)の育てかた (Saenai Hiroin no Sodatekata)
- Genre: Harem; Romantic comedy
- Created by: Fumiaki Maruto
- Light novel
- Written by: Fumiaki Maruto
- Illustrated by: Kurehito Misaki
- Published by: Fujimi Shobo
- Imprint: Fujimi Fantasia Bunko
- Original run: July 20, 2012 – October 20, 2017
- Volumes: 13
Further information
Manga
Written by	Fumiaki Maruto
Illustrated by	Takeshi Moriki
Published by	Fujimi Shobo
English publisher	NA: Yen Press
Magazine	Monthly Dragon Age
Original run	January 9, 2013 – August 9, 2016
Volumes	8
Manga
Saenai Heroine no Sodatekata: Egoistic-Lily
Written by	Fumiaki Maruto
Illustrated by	Niito
Published by	Kadokawa Shoten
Magazine	Young Ace
Original run	February 4, 2013 – May 2, 2014
Volumes	3
Manga
Saenai Heroine no Sodatekata: Koisuru Metronome
Written by	Fumiaki Maruto
Illustrated by	Sabu Musha
Published by	Square Enix
Magazine	Big Gangan
Original run	August 24, 2013 – April 25, 2018
Volumes	10
Anime television series
Directed by	Kanta Kamei
Produced by	Takeshi Hagiwara; Shinichirou Kawashida; Akitoshi Mori
Written by	Fumiaki Maruto
Music by	Hajime Hyakkoku
Studio	A-1 Pictures
Licensed by	AUS: Madman Entertainment; NA: Aniplex of America; Amazon Prime Video (streaming)
Original network	Fuji TV, KTV (Noitamina)
English network	SEA: ANIPLUS HD
Original run	January 9, 2015 – March 27, 2015
Episodes	13
Light novel
Saenai Heroine no Sodatekata: Girls Side
Written by	Fumiaki Maruto
Illustrated by	Kurehito Misaki
Published by	Fujimi Shobo
Imprint	Fujimi Fantasia Bunko
Original run	February 20, 2015 – June 20, 2017
Volumes	3
Manga
Saenai Heroine no Sodatekata: Girls Side
Written by	Fumiaki Maruto
Illustrated by	Takeshi Moriki
Published by	Kadokawa
Magazine	Dragon Age
Original run	September 9, 2016 – June 9, 2017
Volumes	2
Anime television series
Flat
Directed by	Kanta Kamei
Produced by	Manabu Jinguuji; Takumi Morii
Written by	Fumiaki Maruto
Music by	Hajime Hyakkoku
Studio	A-1 Pictures
Licensed by	Amazon Prime Video
Original network	Fuji TV, Kansai TV (Noitamina)
Original run	April 14, 2017 – June 23, 2017
Episodes	11 + Special
Anime film
Saekano the Movie: Finale (2019)
- icon

Saekano: How to Raise a Boring Girlfriend, known in Japanese as Saenai Heroine no Sodatekata (Note: Japanese: 冴えない彼女(ヒロイン)の育てかた, Hepburn: Saenai Hiroin no Sodatekata) and the short form Saekano, (Note: 冴えカノ) is a Japanese romantic comedy light novel series written by Fumiaki Maruto, with illustrations by Kurehito Misaki. Fujimi Shobo published thirteen volumes between July 2012 and October 2017 under their Fujimi Fantasia Bunko imprint. The story follows high school boy Tomoya Aki, who recruits a trio of high school girls to help him develop a visual novel and sell it at the Comiket convention.

Saekano has received a manga adaptation in addition to three spin-off manga adaptations. An anime television series adaptation by A-1 Pictures aired from January 9 to March 27, 2015, on Fuji TV's noitamina block, which has been licensed by Aniplex of America. A second season aired from April 6 to June 23, 2017, and was streamed exclusively on Amazon Prime Video. A visual novel based on the anime, titled Saenai Heroine no Sodatekata -Blessing Flowers-, was released on April 30, 2015. An animated film, titled Saekano the Movie: Finale, was produced by CloverWorks and premiered on October 26, 2019.

== Premise ==
Tomoya Aki, a high school boy working part-time to fund his otaku lifestyle (light novels, manga, anime, video games like visual novels and dating sims, and related merchandise), meets a beautiful girl one day during spring vacation. A month later, he finds out that the girl is his classmate, Megumi Kato, who is hardly noticeable to her classmates. Hoping to create a visual novel computer game, he turns to school beauties Eriri Spencer Sawamura for designing the art, and Utaha Kasumigaoka for writing the game scenario. Tomoya then recruits Megumi to star as the "heroine" (the main character's love interest) of his game, thus forming the development team "Blessing Software", in which the three most renowned students in the school (Tomoya, Eriri, and Utaha) work on one of the least noticeable (Megumi). The series follows their adventures in developing the game and their plans to sell it at the Comiket convention, as well as the emotional entanglements among the team.

== Publication ==
Saekano: How to Raise a Boring Girlfriend began as a light novel series written by Fumiaki Maruto, with illustrations provided by Kurehito Misaki. The first light novel volume was published by Fujimi Shobo under their Fujimi Fantasia Bunko imprint on July 20, 2012. In the twelfth volume, Maruto announced that the series would end in the thirteenth volume, which was released on October 20, 2017. As of November 2018, thirteen volumes and two short story collections have been published.

== Media ==
=== Manga ===
A manga adaptation with art by Takeshi Moriki was serialized from January 9, 2013, to August 9, 2016, in Fujimi Shobo's shōnen manga magazine Monthly Dragon Age. It was collected in eight tankōbon volumes between August 2013 and November 2016. It was published in English by Yen Press between January 2016 and December 2017.

A spin-off manga titled Saenai Heroine no Sodatekata: Egoistic-Lily (Note: 冴えない彼女(ヒロイン)の育てかた～egoistic-lily～, Saenai Hiroin no Sodatekata ~Egoistic-Lily~) with art by Niito was serialized from February 4, 2013, to May 2, 2014, in Kadokawa Shoten's seinen manga magazine Young Ace. It has been collected in three tankōbon volumes. Another spin-off manga titled Saenai Heroine no Sodatekata: Koisuru Metronome (Note: 冴えない彼女(ヒロイン)の育てかた 恋するメトロノーム, Saenai Hiroin no Sodatekata Koisuru Metoronōmu) with art by Sabu Musha was serialized from August 24, 2013, to April 25, 2018, in Square Enix's seinen manga magazine Big Gangan. It has been collected in ten tankōbon volumes. A manga adaptation of Saenai Heroine no Sodatekata: Girls Side was serialized in Fujimi Shobo's Monthly Dragon Age magazine from September 9, 2016, to June 9, 2017. It has been collected in two tankōbon volumes.

=== Anime series ===
An anime television series adaptation of the light novel series was announced in March 2014 to premiere on Fuji TV's Noitamina block in January 2015. The anime was produced by A-1 Pictures and directed by Kanta Kamei, with scripts written by series creator Fumiaki Maruto, character designs by Tomoaki Takase and music by Hajime Hyakkoku. The opening theme song for the anime was "Kimiiro Signal" (Note: 君色シグナル, Kimiiro Shigunaru) by Luna Haruna, while the ending theme song was "Colorful." (Note: カラフル。, Karafuru.) by Miku Sawai. The series aired from January 9 to March 27, 2015, with a total of 13 episodes. The first season has been licensed for North America by Aniplex of America.

A second season to the anime series, titled Saekano: How to Raise a Boring Girlfriend Flat, (Note: 冴えない彼女(ヒロイン)の育てかた♭, Saenai Hiroin no Sodatekata Furatto) was announced on May 3, 2015, with the main staff and cast returning from the previous season to reprise their roles. It aired on Fuji TV's Noitamina block from April 13 to June 23, 2017, with 12 episodes, with the web-only episode 0 streamed on April 5, 2017. The opening theme song for the second season is "Stella Breeze" (Note: ステラブリーズ, Sutera Burīzu) by Luna Haruna, while the ending theme song are "Pink Diary" (Note: 桜色ダイアリー, Sakurairo Daiarī) for episode 0 to 10 and "Youth Prologue" (Note: 青春プロローグ, Seishun Purorōgu) for episode 11, both sung by Moso Calibration. The second season streamed exclusively on Amazon Prime Video.

=== Theatrical film ===
An anime film was announced at the "Saekano: How to Raise a Boring Girlfriend Fes. flat -glistening moment-" event on December 3, 2017. The film, titled Saekano the Movie: Finale, (Note: 冴えない彼女(ヒロイン)の育てかた Fine(フィーネ), Saenai Hiroin no Sodatekata Fīne) was produced by CloverWorks and directed by Akihisa Shibata, with Kanta Kamei serving as chief director. The rest of the main staff and cast from the anime series returned to reprise their roles. It premiered in Japan on October 26, 2019. The theme song "glory days", was sung by Luna Haruna, with Miku Sawai composing.

=== Video game ===
A PlayStation Vita visual novel based on the anime, titled Saenai Heroine no Sodatekata -Blessing Flowers-, (Note: 冴えない彼女(ヒロイン)の育てかた -blessing flowers-) was released on April 30, 2015. A limited edition with an original soundtrack CD and a B2-size cloth poster retailed for 8,800 yen (about US$74), a regular edition for 6,800 yen (US$57), and a download edition for 6,000 yen (US$51). The first copies of all editions included a download code for an original custom PS Vita theme. The game utilizes Live2D software, which moves the characters with CGI but retains their two-dimensional look.

== Reception ==
Saekano: How to Raise a Boring Girlfriend ranked 10th place on the "Top-Selling Light Novels in Japan by Series" with 227,314 copies sold in the period between November 2014 and May 2015, and later ranked 16th place with 313,744 copies sold between November 2014 and November 2015.

== See also ==
- White Album 2, a video game whose scenario is written by Fumiaki Maruto
- Grow Up Show, an original anime television series with character designs by Kurehito Misaki and produced by A-1 Pictures
- It's a Little Late, but I've Fallen in Love with My Childhood Friend, a mixed-media project written by Fumiaki Maruto
- Playful Relationships, another light novel series illustrated by Kurehito Misaki
