= List of Do You Love Your Mom and Her Two-Hit Multi-Target Attacks? volumes =

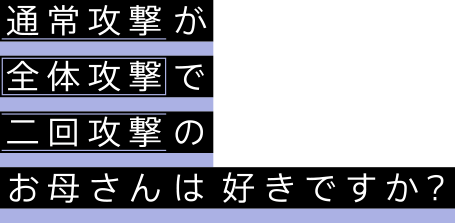
Official Japanese logo of Do You Love Your Mom and Her Two-Hit Multi-Target Attacks?

Do You Love Your Mom and Her Two-Hit Multi-Target Attacks? is a light novel series written by Dachima Inaka, with illustrations by Pochi Iida. It was launched under Fujimi Shobo's Fujimi Fantasia Bunko label, with eleven volumes published from January 20, 2017, to April 17, 2020. During their panel at Sakura-Con on March 31, 2018, North American publisher Yen Press announced that they had licensed the series. The English version was translated by Andrew Cunningham.

A manga adaptation by Meicha was serialized in Kadokawa Shoten's Young Ace Up digital manga magazine from September 26, 2017, to January 18, 2021. The series was also serialized on Kadokawa's Comic Walker platform. Five tankōbon volumes were published from August 25, 2018, to February 4, 2021. The manga is also licensed in North America by Yen Press.

== Volume list ==
=== Light novel ===
No.	Title	Original release date	English release date
1	Hahaoya to Issho ni Bōken no Tabi ni Detara Nakayoku Naremasu ka? (母親と一緒に冒険の旅に出たら仲良くなれますか？)	January 20, 2017; 978-4-04-072203-0	November 27, 2018; 978-1-97-532800-9
Prologue: A Certain Boy's Answers; Chapter 1: The Boy Thought He Was Embarking on a Great Adventure... But, Uh, What's Going on Here?; Chapter 2: It's Just a Coincidence They're All Girls. Got That? Wipe That Smirk off Your Face.; Chapter 3: Underwear Is Armor. Make Sure It's High in Defense. Otherwise, My Son Might Die!; Chapter 4: Not Once Have I Ever Thought, Thank God My Mom's So Understanding.; Chapter 5: Kids Are Kids and Parents Are Parents (but Also Human Beings), and It Takes All Kinds, but They Get Through It Together, Right?; Epilogue; Afterword
2	Okāsan to Issho ni Gakuen ni Ikimashou ne! (お母さんと一緒に学園に行きましょうね！)	April 20, 2017; 978-4-04-072204-7	March 19, 2019; 978-1-97-532837-5
Prologue: One Boy's Progress Report; Chapter 1: We Advance with Greed in Our Hearts! ...Wait, That Sounds Bad...; Chapter 2: School Is Filled with Thrills! ...Sounds Good, but It's Mostly Exhausting.; Chapter 3: The Graffiti on That Wall Is a Beautiful Memory, but the Fist and Foot Marks Are Best Forgotten. We Should Really Get Rid of Those.; Chapter 4: Mom's Baggage Had a Food Sanitation Notebook. No Signs of a Chef's License.; Chapter 5: If I Don't Tell Her, She'll Never Get It, but If I Do, She'll Probably Hit Me. Families Are Tough.; Epilogue; Afterword
3	Okāsan Girudo de, Danjon Kōryaku Shimashou ne! (お母さんギルドで、ダンジョン攻略しましょうね！)	August 19, 2017; 978-4-04-072426-3	July 23, 2019; 978-1-97-532839-9
Prologue: A Certain Mom's Progress Report; Chapter 1: Whoa, There's a Rut Here. Not Stepping in That. Definitely Not.; Chapter 2: At Mom's Guild, Business Is Booming! ...But We’d Be Better Off Without These Guests!; Chapter 3: When Mothers Assemble, They Form a Combo. No, I'm Not Talking About a Puzzle Game. Something Actually Terrible.; Chapter 4: The Courage to Accept Things. A Loving Heart. Also, Full-Body Armor. That's What a Mother Needs... Wait, Armor?; Chapter 5: Chapter 5: I Hoped Against Hope the Wish Would Not Be Granted. But It Totally Was.; Epilogue; Afterword
4	Banī Okāsan to Kajino ni Ikimashou! (バニーお母さんとカジノに行きましょう！)	January 20, 2018; 978-4-04-072427-0	November 26, 2019; 978-1-97-532841-2
Prologue: A Certain Boy’s Progress Report...?; Chapter 1: My Mom Sees Through Everything (Except Her Son's Feelings); Chapter 2: There's a Sweetness in This World That's More Dangerous Than Any Sugar. Absorb Too Much, and...; Chapter 3: Three Bunny Girls and Two Bunny Moms Make a Full House! I'm So Not Thrilled!; Chapter 4: Housework Is a Mother's Battleground. But If a Son Puts His Mind to It... Ack! Stop That!; Chapter 5: Just Like with Gambling, the Greater the Appeal, the Greater the Risk. I Realized As Much from Watching Someone Close to Me.; Epilogue; Afterword
5	Tenkaichi Hahadōkai, Kaisai! (天下一母道会、開催！)	April 20, 2018; 978-4-04-072701-1	March 24, 2020; 978-1-97-535942-3
Prologue: An Application from a Certain Mother; Chapter 1: Mom's the Star of the Show! The Hero Son Does Odd Jobs! This Is How It Always Is, and It Sucks.; Chapter 2: The Way of the Mother Teaches the Art of Using the Body and Tools to Do Housework...Apparently.; Chapter 3: The Staff Fight Harder than the Contestants and Take More Damage. Why?; Chapter 4: That Lunch Was Made by Mom but Not My Mom.; Chapter 5: I Don't Understand Those Feelings Now, but...Maybe Someday?; Epilogue; Afterword
6	Oyako no Nayami wa ma Gata ko ni o Makase! (親子の悩みは真々子にお任せ！)	August 18, 2018; 978-4-04-072702-8	August 18, 2020; 978-1-97-535943-0
Prologue: Report from a Certain Admin; Chapter 1: Do You Love Your Mom on a Goblin-Slaying Quest?; Chapter 2: Do You Love Your Mom-Turned-Homeroom Teacher?; Chapter 3: This Is the Last Time I'm Letting Mom Fill Out Any Surveys, Ever.; Chapter 4: Just a Little Shopping, They Say, but It Never Actually Ends There with Moms.; Chapter 5: "Courtship Is Basically an Interview, Right?" I Said, and the Girls All Looked Disgusted. Baffling.; Chapter 6: MP-Free. Ridiculously Effective. Should a Skill Like That Even Exist? Concerning.; Epilogue; Afterword
7	Okāsan to Issho ni Rizōto Kaihatsu Shimashou ne (お母さんと一緒にリゾート開発しましょうね)	December 20, 2018; 978-4-04-072703-5	November 17, 2020; 978-1-97-530631-1
Prologue: To All MMMMMORPG (Working Title) Test Players; Chapter 1: So Begins the Harshest, Yet Most Tragically Overprotected Adventure in History.; Chapter 2: Since We're Living Here Now, the Uninhabited Island Is Technically Inhabited, but Pay That No Mind.; Chapter 3: The Incident Occurred While I Was Gone. I Knew Then I Was Never Meant to Be a Detective.; Chapter 4: I Pinched My Cheek. It Didn't Hurt. This Isn't a Dream! The Chronicle of This Son's Greatest Adventure Ever Begins!; Chapter 5: I Discovered a Power That Anybody, Even an Idiot Like Me, Possesses.; Epilogue; Afterword
8	Okāsan, Aidoru ni Natte Tsuideni Sekai o Sukutchau wa ne (お母さん、アイドルになってついでに世界を救っちゃうわね)	April 20, 2019; 978-4-04-073147-6	February 23, 2021; 978-1-97-530632-8
Prologue: The Producer Vanishes; Chapter 1: Things That I Believed Were Forever: Parents, Money, and...Porta?; Chapter 2: The One You Always Say "Good Morning" To Is Gone. What Now? The Answer's Obvious.; Chapter 3: Meetings, Partings, and Reunions. The Bonds We Share...Really Rattle Us.; Chapter 4: Something's Happening Without Our Knowledge. Something Outrageous.; Chapter 5: Someone Who's Gentle, Free-Spirited, At Times Strict and Baffling. Such a Person Can Be a Weapon Sometimes.; Epilogue; Afterword
9	Okāsan to Issho ni Merī Kurisumasu (お母さんと一緒にメリークリスマス)	September 20, 2019; 978-4-04-073148-3	May 25, 2021; 978-1-97-531841-3
Prologue: The Heavenly Kings' Decree; Chapter 1: A Fierce Battle Cry of Cock-a-Doodle-Doo... Huh? Why a Rooster?; Chapter 2: Dah (Translation: Weren't the Libere Kings Enough? Why Me, Too?); Chapter 3: Children Spend Their Lives Locked in Combat with Fun. Childhood Is a Battle Royale.; Chapter 4: "What Do You Mean, Spoil...Aughhh!" Said the RPG Boss. What? That Never Happened?; Chapter 5: I Don't Want to Call This the Miracle of the Holy Night. This Is the Result of One Family's Hard Work.; Epilogue; Afterword
10	Gēmu Sekai ni “Otōsan” Tōjō!? (ゲーム世界に『お父さん』登場!?)	December 20, 2019; 978-4-04-073149-0	August 31, 2021; 978-1-97-531843-7
Prologue: Activation; Chapter 1: All You Can Eat! The Oosuki Family Rice Bowl, Topped with Familial Reminiscences!; Chapter 2: Does MOD Stand for Mom's Overbearing Devotion?; Chapter 3: Adventurers' Respite; Chapter 4: The Anti-Shoplifting Squad: Mamako's Case File ~Those Who Challenge Mothers~; Chapter 5: True Story? A Family-and-Party Adventure Documentary; Chapter 6: Oh, Someone's Here. Who's That? I Don't Know Them... Or Do I?; Epilogue; Afterword
11	Hahaoya to Issho ni Bōken no Tabi ni Dete Nakayoku Naremashita ka? (母親と一緒に冒険の旅に出て仲良くなれましたか？)	April 17, 2020; 978-4-04-073626-6	December 14, 2021; 978-1-97-531845-1
Prologue: A Certain Boy's Answers; Chapter 1: Maybe a Real Hero Is Someone Brave Enough to Include "Hero" in Their Work History.; Chapter 2: Don't Accept the Demon Lord's Invitation! ...But I Guess Refusing Is Rude Sometimes.; Chapter 3: Those Who Set Foot in the Forbidden Realms Experience Three Kinds of Hell.; Chapter 4: What's the End of an Adventure Like? ...Thinking About It Put Me to Sleep.; Chapter 5: Is a Mom and Her Two-Hit Multi-Target Attacks Still a Mom Through and Through?; Epilogue; Afterword

=== Manga ===
No.	Original release date	Original ISBN	English release date	English ISBN
1	August 25, 2018	978-4-04-106840-3	September 3, 2019	978-1-97-538524-8
Chapter 1: "The Boy Thought He Was Embarking on a Great Adventure... But, Uh, What Going On Here? ①" (少年の壮大なる冒険が始まると思ってたら・・・・・・え、どういうことだよこれ・・・・・・。①, Shōnen no Sōdainaru Bōken ga Hajimaru to Omottetara e, dō iu Kotoda yo kore.①); Chapter 1: "The Boy Thought He Was Embarking on a Great Adventure... But, Uh, What Going On Here? ②" (少年の壮大なる冒険が始まると思ってたら・・・・・・え、どういうことだよこれ・・・・・・。②, Shōnen no Sōdainaru Bōken ga Hajimaru to Omottetara e, dō iu Kotoda yo kore.②); Chapter 1: "The Boy Thought He Was Embarking on a Great Adventure... But, Uh, What Going On Here? ③" (少年の壮大なる冒険が始まると思ってたら・・・・・・え、どういうことだよこれ・・・・・・。③, Shōnen no Sōdainaru Bōken ga Hajimaru to Omottetara e, dō iu Kotoda yo kore.③); Chapter 2: "It's Just a Coincidence They're All Girls. Got That? Wipe That Smirk Off Your Face. ①" (女子ばっかなのは偶然だ。誤解するな。笑顔でこっちを見るな。①, Joshi Bakkana no wa Gūzenda. Gokai suru na. Egao de Kotchi o Miruna.①); Chapter 2: "It's Just a Coincidence They're All Girls. Got That? Wipe That Smirk Off Your Face. ②" (女子ばっかなのは偶然だ。誤解するな。笑顔でこっちを見るな。②, Joshi Bakkana no wa Gūzenda. Gokai suru na. Egao de Kotchi o Miruna.②); Chapter 2: "It's Just a Coincidence They're All Girls. Got That? Wipe That Smirk Off Your Face. ③" (女子ばっかなのは偶然だ。誤解するな。笑顔でこっちを見るな。③, Joshi Bakkana no wa Gūzenda. Gokai suru na. Egao de Kotchi o Miruna.③); Chapter 2: "It's Just a Coincidence They're All Girls. Got That? Wipe That Smirk Off Your Face. ④" (女子ばっかなのは偶然だ。誤解するな。笑顔でこっちを見るな。④, Joshi Bakkana no wa Gūzenda. Gokai suru na. Egao de Kotchi o Miruna.④); Chapter 0: "Episode: 0" (EPISODE: 0)
2	April 25, 2019	978-4-04-107912-6	January 14, 2020	978-1-97-538745-7
Chapter 3: "Underwear Is Armor. Make Sure It's High in Defense. Otherwise, My Son Might Die! ①" (下着は防具。守備面積は大きめに。さもなくば息子が死ぬぞ！①, Shitagi wa Bōgu. Shubi Menseki wa Ōkime ni. Sa mo Nakuba Musuko ga Shinu Zo!①); Chapter 3: "Underwear Is Armor. Make Sure It's High in Defense. Otherwise, My Son Might Die! ②" (下着は防具。守備面積は大きめに。さもなくば息子が死ぬぞ！②, Shitagi wa Bōgu. Shubi Menseki wa Ōkime ni. Sa mo Nakuba Musuko ga Shinu Zo!②); Chapter 3: "Underwear Is Armor. Make Sure It's High in Defense. Otherwise, My Son Might Die! ③" (下着は防具。守備面積は大きめに。さもなくば息子が死ぬぞ！③, Shitagi wa Bōgu. Shubi Menseki wa Ōkime ni. Sa mo Nakuba Musuko ga Shinu Zo!③); Chapter 3: "Underwear Is Armor. Make Sure It's High in Defense. Otherwise, My Son Might Die! ④" (下着は防具。守備面積は大きめに。さもなくば息子が死ぬぞ！④, Shitagi wa Bōgu. Shubi Menseki wa Ōkime ni. Sa mo Nakuba Musuko ga Shinu Zo!④); Chapter 4: "Not Once Have I Ever Thought Thank God My Mom's So Understanding. ①" (理解のある母親でよかったなんて、ちっとも思ってねーし。 ①, Rikai no Aru Hahaoyade Yokatta Nante, Chittomo Omotte ne ̄ Shi.①); Special Short Story: "Mom's Stats Are All Kinds of Messed Up"
3	October 4, 2019	978-4-04-108593-6	June 23, 2020	978-1-97-531106-3
Chapter 4: "Not Once Have I Ever Thought Thank God My Mom's So Understanding. ②" (理解のある母親でよかったなんて、ちっとも思ってねーし。 ②, Rikai no Aru Hahaoyade Yokatta Nante, Chittomo Omotte ne ̄ Shi.②); Chapter 4: "Not Once Have I Ever Thought Thank God My Mom's So Understanding. ③" (理解のある母親でよかったなんて、ちっとも思ってねーし。 ③, Rikai no Aru Hahaoyade Yokatta Nante, Chittomo Omotte ne ̄ Shi.③); Chapter 5 "Kids Are Kids and Parents Are Parents (but Also Human Beings), and It Takes All Kinds, but They Get Through It Together, Right? ①" (子供は子供で、親も親で人間で、色々あるけど、何とかするのが親子だろ。①, Kodomo wa Kodomo de, Oya mo Oya de Ningen de, Iroiro Arukedo, Nantoka Suru no ga Oyakodaro.①); Chapter 5: "Kids Are Kids and Parents Are Parents (but Also Human Beings), and It Takes All Kinds, but They Get Through It Together, Right? ②" (子供は子供で、親も親で人間で、色々あるけど、何とかするのが親子だろ。②, Kodomo wa Kodomo de, Oya mo Oya de Ningen de, Iroiro Arukedo, Nantoka Suru no ga Oyakodaro.②); Chapter 5: "Kids Are Kids and Parents Are Parents (but Also Human Beings), and It Takes All Kinds, but They Get Through It Together, Right? ③" (子供は子供で、親も親で人間で、色々あるけど、何とかするのが親子だろ。③, Kodomo wa Kodomo de, Oya mo Oya de Ningen de, Iroiro Arukedo, Nantoka Suru no ga Oyakodaro.③); Special Short Story: "Maman Village Stay"
4	July 3, 2020	978-4-04-109742-7	March 30, 2021	978-1-97-532250-2
Chapter 5: "Kids Are Kids and Parents Are Parents (but Also Human Beings), and It Takes All Kinds, but They Get Through It Together, Right? ④"; Chapter 5: "Kids Are Kids and Parents Are Parents (but Also Human Beings), and It Takes All Kinds, but They Get Through It Together, Right? ⑤"; Chapter 6: "We Advance with Greed in Our Hearts! ...Wait, That Sounds Bad... ①"; Chapter 6: "We Advance with Greed in Our Hearts! ...Wait, That Sounds Bad... ②"; Chapter 7: "The Graffiti on That Wall Is a Beautiful Memory, but the Fist and Foot Marks Are Best Forgotten. We Should Really Get Rid of Those ①"; Chapter 7: "The Graffiti on That Wall Is a Beautiful Memory, but the Fist and Foot Marks Are Best Forgotten. We Should Really Get Rid of Those ②"
5	February 4, 2021	978-4-04-109743-4	January 18, 2022	978-1-97-533803-9
Chapter 7: "The Graffiti on That Wall Is a Beautiful Memory, but the Fist and Foot Marks Are Best Forgotten. We Should Really Get Rid of Those ③"; Chapter 8: "Mom's Baggage Had a Food Sanitation Notebook. No Signs of a Chef's License. ①"; Chapter 8: "Mom's Baggage Had a Food Sanitation Notebook. No Signs of a Chef's License. ②"; Last Chapter: "If I Don't Tell Her, She'll Never Get It, but If I Do, She'll Probably Hit Me. Families Are Tough. ①"; Last Chapter: "If I Don't Tell Her, She'll Never Get It, but If I Do, She'll Probably Hit Me. Families Are Tough. ②"; Last Chapter: "If I Don't Tell Her, She'll Never Get It, but If I Do, She'll Probably Hit Me. Families Are Tough. ③"
