= List of Do You Love Your Mom and Her Two-Hit Multi-Target Attacks? episodes =

Do You Love Your Mom and Her Two-Hit Multi-Target Attacks?
- Promotional poster for the anime
- No. of episodes: 12 + OVA

Release
- Original network: Tokyo MX, GTV, GYT, BS11, AT-X, MBS, TVA, NCC
- Original release: July 13 – September 28, 2019

Do You Love Your Mom and Her Two-Hit Multi-Target Attacks? is a 2019 anime television series based on the light novel, which was written by Dachima Inaka and illustrated by Pochi Iida. The series was announced at the "Fantasia Bunko Dai Kanshasai 2018" event on October 21, 2018. The series was directed by Yoshiaki Iwasaki and written by Deko Akao, with animation by studio J.C.Staff. Yohei Yaegashi provided the series' character designs. Keiji Inai composed the music. It ran for 12 episodes from July 13 to September 28, 2019, on Tokyo MX and other channels. (Note: Tokyo MX listed the series premiere at 24:00 on July 12, 2019, which is effectively July 13 at midnight JST.) Spira Spica performed the series' opening theme song "Iya yo Iya yo Mosuki no Uchi" (イヤヨイヤヨモスキノウチ), while Ai Kayano performed the series' ending theme song "Tsūjou Kōgeki ga Zentai Kōgeki de ni Kai Kōgeki Mama" (通常攻撃が全体攻撃で二回攻撃ママ). An additional OVA episode is bundled with the series' sixth Blu-ray volume, which was released on March 25, 2020. Aniplex of America has licensed the series.

== Episodes ==
No.	Title (Note: All English titles are taken from Crunchyroll.)	Original release date
1	"The Boy Thought He Was Embarking on a Great Adventure... But, Uh, What's Going on Here?"; Transliteration: "Shōnen no sōdainaru bōken ga hajimaru to omottetara...e, dōiu kotodayo kore..." (Japanese: 少年の壮大なる冒険が始まると思ってたら…え、どういうことだよこれ…。)	July 13, 2019
Masato Oosuki fills out a questionnaire claiming to have a very average relationship with his mother, Mamako. Masumi Shirase, from the Cabinet Office, informs Masato he is to start a new life inside a video game. However, after entering the fantasy world, Mamako is transported alongside him. The Teleportation King registers them as "Normal Hero" and "Normal Hero's Mother", and explains they were selected based on Masato's questionnaire, and have been transported inside the game via unexplained technology. Masato is allowed to choose a sword and he selects Firmament, Holy Sword of the Great Heavens, while Mamako grabs two swords, Terra de Madre, Holy Sword of Mother Earth and Altura, Holy Sword of Mother Ocean, planning to use them as kitchen knives. It becomes clear Mamako is more powerful than Masato and she admits Shirase sent her with him for a secret reason. They begin in the Kingdom of Mommalia at the adventurer's guild where the desk assistant, Shirarase, looks and acts uncannily like Shirase from the Cabinet Office. When Masato recruits three girls, Mamako decides she must interview them to see which will be a suitable future bride.
2	"It's Just a Coincidence They're All Girls. Got That? Wipe That Smirk Off Your Face."; Transliteration: "Joshi bakka na no wa gūzen da. gokai suru na. egao de kocchi o miru na." (Japanese: 女子ばっかなのは偶然だ。誤解するな。笑顔でこっちを見るな。)	July 20, 2019
Mamako rejects the girls Masato chose. Instead, she recruits Porta, a merchant and craftswoman. Masato then tries to reject Wise, a Sage with healing and combat magic and a difficult personality, so she teleports them away to punish him. Wise reveals the game is an MMMMMORPG, or Mother's Massively Maternal Multiplayer Make up with Offspring Role Playing Game, the point of which is to improve the mother/child relationship in order to return home. Wise explains her relationship with her mother is so bad they split up and she wants Mamako to adopt her instead. Shirarase teaches Mamako a skill to locate Masato, after which Wise is thrown in jail. Mamako promises to help Wise and her mother reconcile. They decide to conquer a dungeon, but get lost in the dark and Mamako unlocks a Mom Skill, Mother's Light, allowing them to see. She defeats several slimes, leveling herself up, but with her clothes dissolved. Despite being naked, Mamako defeats the slimes, revealing a coffin with another Shirase inside it. After Wise revives her, she reveals she is Shirase the Mysterious Nun and gives them a new quest.
3	"Underwear is Armor. Make Sure It's High in Defense. Otherwise, My Son Might Die!"; Transliteration: "Shitagi wa bōgu. shubi menseki wa ōkime ni. samo naku ba musuko ga shinu zo!" (Japanese: 下着は防具。守備面積は大きめに。さもなくば息子が死ぬぞ！)	July 27, 2019
To prepare for their quest, the party shops for equipment. Masato becomes frustrated with Mamako and snaps at her, but immediately feels guilty where Mamako forgives him. At Maman Village, the Chief explains the Empress of Night has demanded an attractive man and asks Masato to defeat her. Masato enjoys a hot spring, only to be joined by Mamako, Porta and Wise, who reveals she has knowledge of the Empress. She then accidentally reveals her nudity to Masato. Meanwhile, Shirase informs the Empress she has broken too many rules. However, the Empress kills Shirase. Wise tells Masato she will face the Empress alone and Masato, still naked from the hot spring, tries to stop her. Wise admits the Empress is her selfish mother who forced her to enter the game then abandoned her after she realized she could use her magic to establish a new life in the game with money and young men. Wise claims to no longer care, but Mamako knows she is lying and proves it by hugging Wise, who admits the hug feels weird as it did not come from her mother.
4	"Kids Are Kids and Parents Are Parents (but Also Human Beings), and It Takes All Kinds, but They Get Through It Together, Right?"; Transliteration: "Kodomo wa kodomo de, oya mo oya de ningen de, iroiro aru kedo nantoka suru no ga oyako daro." (Japanese: 子供は子供で、親も親で人間で、色々あるけど何とかするのが親子だろ。)	August 3, 2019
The party revives Shirase, who reveals the Empress, real name Kazuno, is suspected of cheating. Shirase offers to waive the fine if Wise can repair their relationship. Kazuno immediately starts a fight where she summons a white room. Masato realizes she is using a hacking tool. Kazuno reveals she plans to use it in the real world to hack her way to riches and power. Kazuno then refuses to listen to Wise as she is still angry. Mamako suddenly breaks into the room. Realizing Kazuno is a Sage like Wise, Masato uses one of Porta's tools to seal Kazuno's magic. Kazuno is overwhelmed and defeated, though Wise catches her before she hits the ground, begging for them to reconcile. Kazuno transforms back to her true form, only to immediately begin arguing with Wise. Shirase accepts this as them reconciling and clearing the game, allowing Kazuno to log out. However, Wise opts to stay with Masato, claiming she want to help the party for fun. The real world Shirase contacts them with a new quest to fix the problems the software writers cannot. Mamako is happy she can have normal conversations with Masato again.
5	"This is a Territory for Children, Filled With Hopes and Dreams. For Children. That's the Important Part!"; Transliteration: "Soko wa yume to kibō ni michita, kodomodachi no ryōiki. Kodomodachi no, da. Koko daiji!" (Japanese: そこは夢と希望に満ちた、子供達の領域。子供達の、だ。ここ大事！)	August 10, 2019
Masato decides to join the Lover's Lane Academy for experience. There, he meets fellow student and mage Medhi and her controlling mother Medhimama, who constantly brags about Medhi's abilities. Medhimama insists on joining the lesson to ensure Medhi remains the strongest student. Experience points are given for correct answers but everyone is sabotaged by Medhimama. Medhimama claims to be the greatest parent in the world by sabotaging others. Masato notices Medhi does not seem to agree with this. Mamako disguises herself as a student and infiltrates the school with Shirase the Principal, who wants them to fix the bugs in the academy software, since the academy was constructed hastily. Mamako observes the next class with Medhimama, who is surprised Mamako worries more about her child making friends than acing the class. Medhi finds Mamako amusing, embarrassing Masato. Medhimama tries to sabotage the class again, but Mamako's Mother's Sharing skill cancels her sabotage spells. Medhi finds her mother's failure amusing. Mamako ends up answering all the questions herself and comes top of the class, with Medhi in second, while Masato, Wise and Porta come in joint last place but Mamako praises their effort anyway.
6	"What a Beautiful Girl... Wait, Not You, Mom. Don't Get Near Me in That Outfit, Stop!"; Transliteration: "Nanto iu bishōjo... iya kāsan ja nakute. Sono kakkō de chikayoru na yamero." (Japanese: なんという美少女…いや母さんじゃなくて。その格好で近寄るなやめろ。)	August 17, 2019
Masato has developed a crush on Medhi. Meanwhile, Medhimama begins a one-sided rivalry with Mamako. Masato notices Medhi making quiet negative comments about Medhimama. Their first lesson is cookery, which Medhi manages to do well at due to Medhimama's cheating. Mamako also does well but with normal cookery, and her food is so good Masato, Wise and Porta get skill boosts and experience points from eating it. Medhi congratulates them but Medhimama is furious. In swimming class, Medhimama appears in a scandalous bikini, but is easily outdone by Mamako in a school swimsuit, infuriating her even further. In the pool, warriors like Wise and Masato are told to defeat sea monsters while crafters like Porta collect the drop items. Mamako shouts encouragement while Medhimama shouts criticism. Medhi loses her self-confidence and gives up, so a monster grabs Mamako, who beats it with her Mother Ocean Sword, allowing Masato to kill it. Masato wins first place and is bear-hugged by Mamako, while Medhimama slaps Medhi for failing. Masato tries to comfort her but she runs away, and Masato and Mamako later see Medhi furiously kicking a wall, swearing and wishing Medhimama was dead.
7	"Students are the Protagonists of a School Festival. But People Wearing School Uniforms are Included, Too."; Transliteration: "Gakusai no shuyaku wa gakuseida. sore wa tada seifuku o kite iru hito mo fukuma rete shimau nodaga na..." (Japanese: 学祭の主役は学生だ。それはただ制服を着ている人も含まれてしまうのだがな…。)	August 24, 2019
The academy announces a festival which the students must plan with their parents for experience points. Mamako suggests a café so Medhimama plans her own café to compete with them. Medhi later approaches Masato to apologize for her mother's behavior. Mamako's café is an immediate success while Medhimama's is ignored. To attract customers, she strips Medhi naked, but when Masato sees this, Medhimama kills him. He becomes a ghost and overhears Medhimama order Medhi to seduce him and ruin Mamako's café. Once revived, Masato angrily confronts Medhimama, who demands they compete in a waitress beauty contest. Medhi defeats Wise in the contest, but Mamako goes on stage to speak to Wise and accidentally defeats Medhi. Masato flees with Medhi so Medhimama cannot punish her. Medhi admits she just wants to have fun, but she has no friends because of Medhimama. Masato, Wise, and Porta decide to be her friends. Seeing this, Medhimama attacks Medhi, calling her a terrible excuse for a daughter, but Mamako stops her. Medhimama admits she only pushes Medhi to be the best because it allows her to claim she is the best mother. Hearing this admission, Medhi unleashes her rage and transforms into a dragon.
8	"If I Say Nothing, It Won't Be Heard, But If I Say Something, It'll Be a Critical Hit. It Sucks Being a Family."; Transliteration: "Iwanakya tsutawaranai ga, ittara kanari no kakuritsu de butsukaru. yakkai da yo, oyako." (Japanese: 言わなきゃ伝わらないが、言ったらかなりの確率でぶつかる。厄介だよ、親子。)	August 31, 2019
Medhimama tries to blame Masato and attacks him, but Mamako stops her. Medhi drains all Wise's magic and argues with Masato over him having a wonderful mother. Mamako uses another skill, Mother's Words, to communicate to Medhimama. Realizing she has been selfish, Medhimama tries to apologize but Medhi attacks her. Medhi then steals Medhimama's staff and encases herself in a protective shell. Once Mamako breaks the staff, Medhi transform back into a human. Medhimama catches her and they reconcile. Masato realizes Medhimama's staff amplifies its wielder's feelings. At the academy's graduation party, Medhimama decides to log out, but Medhi decides to stay and become the party's healer, much to Wise's chagrin. Shirase the Mysterious Nun arrives with the tool prizes for graduating, only to reveal they must wager the experience they gained in classes for spins on a roulette wheel to "maybe" win the tools. Masato and Wise waste all their experience but only win health and magic potions. As a bonus for reconciling Medhi and her mother, Shirase gives Masato a bonus spin, and he wins Mamako a new mother's apron, which he decides he can live with.
9	"Whoa, There's a Pressure Plate in a Place Like This. Well, I'm Not Stepping On It. No, I'm Saying I Won't!"; Transliteration: "Otto, konna tokoro ni suitchi yuka ga aru zo. mā fumanai kedo. iya fumanai kara." (Japanese: おっと、こんなところにスイッチ床があるぞ。まあ踏まないけど。いや踏まないから。)	September 7, 2019
Medhi quickly realizes there is not much to do in Masato's party. Masato finds a flyer for a new tower dungeon with a single wish as its final prize and decides to invade it. However, upon arriving in the area, Masato finds it full of angry mothers. They locate Shirase in a nearby coffin. She informs them she has no knowledge of the tower and she suspects someone is sabotaging the game. Upon entering the tower's first few floors, they meet Amante, a member of an anti-mother party called "Ribele". Deciding they cannot let delinquents get their hands on the wish, Masato decides to defeat Ribele and return the members to their parents. However, to be strong enough to beat the tower, Shirase suggests forming a guild. They take over an old guild hall, which Mamako names the With MomMy Guild. Masato, Medhi and Porta go shopping for building materials to repair the guild, only to see Amante shopping as well. She attempts to insult them but Medhi unleashes her dark side, so Amante admits she sent an assassin to their new guild. Wise suddenly teleports in to tell Masato Mamako is in danger.
10	"The With Mommy Guild Welcomes All! ...Wait, It's a Bunch of Uninvited Guests!"; Transliteration: "Okāsan to issho girudo wa senkyakubanrai!... tte, manekarezarukyaku bakka ka yo!" (Japanese: お母さんと一緒ギルドは千客万来！……って、招かれざる客ばっかかよ！)	September 14, 2019
Masato rushes back to the guild only to find Mamako about to hand over all their money to a disguised assassin. The assassin flees, leaving a bomb, but Mamako disarms the bomb with the skill Mother's Headpat. Amante appears demanding to know why her bomb did not explode, but flees after seeing Mamako. The assassin and his team reveal they planted bombs around the city and will set them off unless the girls serve them as maids. However, their interaction with Mamako reminds them of their mothers. In the end, they agree to remove the bombs and apologize to their mothers. Mamako insists everyone share a hot spring to decide their next move, but Amante burst in, furious at losing her assassins. However, she becomes embarrassed at the girls bathing naked with Masato. Shirase arrives at the guild with all the mothers who volunteered to join their guild and clear the tower, as thanks for returning three of their sons. Amante plants bombs in the tower to kill them all, but grows frustrated when the mothers are late, and accidentally blows herself up by falling down the stairs.
11	"The Courage to Accept Things. A Loving Heart. Also, Full-Body Armor. That's What a Mother Needs... Wait, Armor?"; Transliteration: "Uketomeru yūki. itsukushimu kokoro. ato zenshin yoroi. sore ga hahaoya ni hissu no... n? Yoroi?" (Japanese: 受け止める勇気。慈しむ心。あと全身鎧。それが母親に必須の……ん？ 鎧？)	September 21, 2019
The party finally makes it inside the tower. They climb the rubble made by Amante's explosion and make it to the next floor, annoying Amante. She teleports to another floor and sets a trap to electrocute anyone using metal weapons, but electrocutes herself by accident. A thoroughly disheveled and frustrated Amante challenges Mamako to a competition to prove she doesn't need a mother. Mamako easily wins both a dishwashing and laundry competition so Amante flees again. On the 90th floor, they run into a trap that strips their armor, leaving everyone in their underwear, except the mothers, while Masato is mortified at seeing Mamako in her underwear. Amante, likewise in her underwear, reveals she transformed all the children into monsters and amplified their anger to make them attack their mothers. Medhi and Wise confuse the monsters with magic while Mamako activates her skill Full Mom-or, clothing the mothers in armor to find out why their children are unhappy without taking damage. With the children reconciled with their mothers and returned to normal, the assassin reveals the wish Amante wants granted is to get rid of all mothers.
12	"I Hoped Against Hope the Wish Would Not Be Granted. But It Totally Was."; Transliteration: "Sono negai wa kanaenai de kure, to tsuyoku negatta. daga negai wa kanae rareta." (Japanese: その願いは叶えないでくれ、と強く願った。だが願いは叶えられた。)	September 28, 2019
The party rushes to the 100th floor and are separated from each other. Masato is attacked by fake Mamakos, but is saved by the real one. They then reunite with Wise, Medhi, and Porta. Amante defeats the boss and decides to defeat Mamako as well. She reveals her constant rejection of mothers unlocked a disobedience skill that reflects all magical attacks. She then points out that Masato has been unable to experience the adventures and romance he wanted. Masato admits that while this is true, he wants to continue adventuring with Mamako. Amante claims she hates all mothers so Mamako uses a Higher Skill, Mother Says No, injuring but not defeating her. Amante rushes to claim the wish so Masato blurts out something Mamako wished for: fresh eggs. Amante is denied her wish and flees. Later, Shirase reveals Amante dropped a dark crystal identical to crystals used to corrupt Wise and Medhi's mothers. She also reveals Ribele is made up of Four Fiends, and with Amante defeated, there are three more Fiends to defeat, which she makes their next quest. Masato admits it is no longer just his adventure; it is his and Mamako's.
13 (OVA)	"Do You Love Your Mom on the Shore?"; Transliteration: "Namiuchigiwa no okāsan wa sukidesu ka?" (Japanese: 波打ち際のお母さんは好きですか？)	March 25, 2020
Shirase takes the party to the beach. Mamako tries to be close to Masato, but he refuses to play. Shirase suggests watermelon splitting. However, when Mamako's instructions cause Masato to walk into her breasts, he throws his wooden sword into the sea, only for it to come back and hit him in the head, causing amnesia. His vague memories of Mamako cause him to start being nice to her. Suspecting Masato may quit their current adventure, Wise and Medhi try to seduce him in order to hit him on the head again, but he refuses their advances. Masato then meets up with Mamako. While they are alone, he declares his love and tries to kiss her, but suddenly she is grabbed by a giant kraken, causing him to suddenly cry out "Mom". After Masato saves Mamako, the kraken grabs him instead. Mamako defeats the kraken and uses her Mother Ocean sword to part the ocean. With Masato's memory back, the party decides to barbecue a kraken tentacle, only for it to explode off the grill and hit the girls on the head, putting Shirase in a coffin, but leaving Mamako, Wise, Medhi and Porta with amnesia.

== Home media release ==
=== Japanese ===
Aniplex (Japan – Region 2/A)
Vol.	Episodes	Cover character(s)	Release date	Ref.
1	1–2	Masato and Mamako Oosuki	September 25, 2019	
2	3–4	Mamako Oosuki and Wise	October 30, 2019	
3	5–6	Porta and Mamako Oosuki	November 27, 2019	
4	7–8	Medhi and Mamako Oosuki	December 25, 2019	
5	9–10	Mamako Oosuki and Masumi Shirase	January 29, 2020	
6	11–12	Masato and Mamako Oosuki	February 26, 2020	
7	OVA	Wise, Mamako Oosuki, Porta, and Medhi	March 25, 2020	
