= Mamako Oosuki =

Fictional character in Japanese light novel series

- Do You Love Your Mom and Her Two-Hit Multi-Target Attacks? character
- Mamako Oosuki as illustrated by Pochi Iida
- First appearance: Do You Love Your Mom and Her Two-Hit Multi-Target Attacks? volume 1 (January 20, 2017)
- Created by: Dachima Inaka; Pochi Iida
- Voiced by: Ai Kayano

In-universe information
- Gender: Female
- Relatives: Masato Oosuki (son); Hayato Oosuki (husband)
- Nationality: Japanese

Mamako Oosuki (Note: Japanese: 大好 真々子, Hepburn: Ōsuki Mamako) is a fictional character who appears as the female protagonist of the Japanese light novel series Do You Love Your Mom and Her Two-Hit Multi-Target Attacks?, created by Dachima Inaka and Pochi Iida. Mamako is depicted as the loving but overly doting mother of teenager Masato Oosuki, who is often irritated by her behavior. At the start of the series, the two are teleported via unexplained technology to a fantasy-themed world within an online game, where Mamako discovers she has much higher stats than Masato, meaning she is more powerful than him.

In the anime adaptation of Do You Love Your Mom and Her Two-Hit Multi-Target Attacks?, Mamako is voiced by Ai Kayano, who previously provided the voice of the character in a series of promotions for the light novels. Even though she is regarded as one of the most popular characters in the series, with several pieces of merchandise released in Mamako's likeness, she has received mostly a mixed reception from both fans and critics; while Mamako has been praised for her design, personality and physical attractiveness, she has been criticized for her lack of development beyond her relationship with Masato.

== Concept and creation ==
The character of Mamako Oosuki made her debut appearance in the first volume of the light novel series Do You Love Your Mom and Her Two-Hit Multi-Target Attacks?, which was published on January 20, 2017. She is presented as the heroine and one of the main protagonists of the novels alongside her son Masato Oosuki. Mamako was created by Japanese writer Dachima Inaka, author of the series, while her basic design was provided by illustrator Pochi Iida. In April 2019, during an interview, when asked what led him to decide to use a mother as the protagonist of the series, Inaka admitted that he got the idea when he heard the word "mother" on TV. Inaka also commented that when writing the novels, he envisioned Mamako as a young and beautiful-looking mother who would constantly outshine her son with her abilities.

During an interview in May 2019, voice actress Ai Kayano, who provided the voice of Mamako in the anime adaptation of the series, said she is the type of character rarely seen in everyday life. Regarding Mamako's characterization, Kayano considered that she is a surprisingly strong person who has the "perfect body", which is accentuated in several scenes in the anime where she is seen naked, but does not feel embarrassed when people see her without clothes. Kayano also revealed that she believes it is common in light novels for the hero (Masato) and heroine (Mamako) to have a romantic relationship, but added that that kind of context does not apply to the series due to the mother-son relationship that the main characters have. In another interview, Kayano noted that Mamako's role in the novels is more like a "mascot-like existence" than a mother traveling with her child. Kayano also stated that, in acting as the character, she was always aware of Mamako's image, which, in Kayano's opinion, helped protect the character's humanity.

== Appearances ==
In addition to the light novel series, Mamako is featured in the web manga adaptation of Do You Love Your Mom and Her Two-Hit Multi-Target Attacks?, written and illustrated by Meicha. Before voicing the character in the 2019 anime, Ai Kayano previously provided the voice of Mamako in a series of promotions for the novels. Mamako appears in the RPG browser game adaptation of Do You Love Your Mom and Her Two-Hit Multi-Target Attacks?. Mamako also appears in a collaborative study book titled Let's Study English With Your Mom; customers that purchased the book were able to download bonus audio recordings of Kayano as Mamako.

== Reception ==
=== Critical response ===
Allen Moody of THEM Anime Reviews said that Mamako is a "saint" compared to the other mothers seen on the series, as well as underscoring how she is "by far the most voluptuous female in the show"; in Moody's opinion, Mamako's attractiveness makes her mainly used for fan service. Furthermore, Moody compared Mamako's abilities with those of her son Masato, stating, "The idea here is that Mamako's domestic/maternal skills are elevated to superpowers in the game's world. Her personality is cloyingly sweet (and completely ditzy), and I kind of shared Masato's frustration that her carefree, (seemingly) stupid cheerfulness gives her more power, and defeats more enemies, than Masato's serious approach to the game; she even gets TWO swords, while he gets only one."

In a review for Do You Love Your Mom and Her Two-Hit Multi-Target Attacks?, Steve Jones of Anime News Network complimented Mamako for her "cute" design, while also acknowledging Mamako's fan service status, commenting that she "doesn't remain fully clothed for long [on the show]". In another review, Jones called Mamako a fun character, writing that "her offhand commentary continues to add lots of flavor to the show", while also asserting that he liked the idea of Mamako being "so overpowered she's become a kind of folk hero for mothers throughout the game". In a third review, Jones found Mamako's personality to be "so underdeveloped [that] really hurts the show", writing that the series missed "the great opportunity to flesh out her character, since we've gone an entire season without exploring who she is outside of her relationship with Masato." Bipin Adhikari of Comic Book Resources described Mamako as "an overpowered overprotective mother who can defeat anyone with little inconvenience".

=== Merchandise ===
Several pieces of merchandising action figures based on Mamako have been announced. A 1/7 scale figure of Mamako with her clothes melting (which is based on a scene from episode 2 of the anime) was available for pre-order exclusively on the Aniplex+ web storefront from July 28 to September 29, 2019, at a cost of 14,800 yen. In January 2020, it was announced that a 1/7 scale figure of Mamako would be available for pre-order until February 26, 2020, and would go on sale in June 2020. In December 2020, Good Smile Company announced that a 1/7 scale figure of Mamako wearing a bunny girl suit would be launched on January 27, 2021, for the price is 33,000 yen, including tax.
