= Last Period =

Video game and anime series

- Last Period: The Story of an Endless Spiral

ラストピリオド~終わりなき螺旋の物語~ (Rasuto Piriodo: Owarinaki Rasen no Monogatari)
- Video game
- Developer: Happy Elements
- Publisher: Happy Elements
- Platform: Android, iOS
- Released: JP: May 2016
- Anime television series
- Directed by: Yoshiaki Iwasaki
- Produced by: Takurō Hatakeyama; Reo Kurosu; Kōsuke Matsuda; Kōzō Ōhara; Sō Yurugi; Kimiya Mikami
- Written by: Hideki Shirane
- Music by: Manual of Errors
- Studio: J.C.Staff
- Licensed by: Crunchyroll
- Original network: Tokyo MX, ABC, BS11, AT-X
- Original run: April 12, 2018 – June 28, 2018
- Episodes: 12

Last Period: The Story of an Endless Spiral (ラストピリオド~終わりなき螺旋の物語~, Rasuto Piriodo: Owarinaki Rasen no Monogatari) was an online free-to-play role-playing game created by Happy Elements. It was released in Japan in May 2016 for Android and iOS devices. An anime television series adaptation by J.C.Staff aired from April 12 to June 28, 2018. The game was discontinued in December 2022.

== Characters ==
Haru (ハル)
Voiced by: Natsuki Hanae
Choco (ちょこ, Choko)
Voiced by: Yukari Tamura
Liza (リーザ, Rīza)
Voiced by: Mika Kikuchi
Gajeru (ガジェル)
Voiced by: Ayumu Murase
Erika (エーリカ, Ērika)
Voiced by: Ai Kakuma
Campanella (カンパネルラ, Kanpanerura)
Voiced by: M.A.O
Miu (ミウ)
Voiced by: Reina Ueda
Gilled (ジレッド, Jireddo)
Voiced by: Yamato Kinjo
Noin (ノイン)
Voiced by: Reina Ueda
Iona (イオナ)
Voiced by: Ai Kayano
Mizaru (ミザル)
Voiced by: Sayaka Harada
Kikazaru (キカザル)
Voiced by: Akari Kitō
Iwazaru (イワザル)
Voiced by: Ayumi Mano
Guru (グル)
Voiced by: Shiori Izawa
Dia (ダイヤ)
Voiced by: Misaki Kuno

== Other media ==
An anime television series adaptation by J.C.Staff aired from April 12 to June 28, 2018. (Note: Tokyo MX listed the show at 24:00 on April 11, which is at midnight on April 12, 2018.) The opening theme is "Yokubari Dreamer" (欲張りDreamer, Greed Dreamer) by Natsuki Hanae and Yukari Tamura, and the ending theme is Waizuman no Tēma (ワイズマンのテーマ, Wiseman Theme) by Wiseman; a group consisted by Sayaka Harada, Akari Kitō, and Ayumi Mano under their character names. Crunchyroll streamed the series. The series ran for 12 episodes.

No.	Title (Note: All English titles are taken from Crunchyroll.)	Original air date
1	"Notice of Completion"; Transliteration: "Ryō no Oshirase" (Japanese: 了のお知らせ)	April 12, 2018
2	"Hot Springs Custom"; Transliteration: "Onsen aratame" (Japanese: 温泉改)	April 19, 2018
3	"Hand-To-Mouth-Life"; Transliteration: "Sono higurashi" (Japanese: その日暮らし)	April 26, 2018
4	"Rich in Zel"; Transliteration: "O zeru mochi" (Japanese: おゼル持ち)	May 3, 2018
5	"The Swamp's Name"; Transliteration: "Numa no na wa." (Japanese: 沼の名は。)	May 10, 2018
6	"Confessions of a Mask"; Transliteration: "Kamen no Kokuhaku" (Japanese: 仮面の告白)	May 17, 2018
7	"Animal Friends"; Transliteration: "Ani maru tomodachi" (Japanese: あにまるトモダチ)	May 24, 2018
8	"Swimsuit Episode"; Transliteration: "Mizugi kai" (Japanese: 水着貝)	May 31, 2018
9	"Expanding Galaxy"; Transliteration: "Bōchō suru ginga" (Japanese: 膨張する銀河)	June 7, 2018
10	"The Happy Elements Episode"; Transliteration: "Wa piere kai" (Japanese: はぴえれ怪)	June 14, 2018
11	"Fictional Story"; Transliteration: "Kakū no Hanashi" (Japanese: 架空の話)	June 21, 2018
12	"Last Period"; Transliteration: "Rasuto Piriodo" (Japanese: ラストピリオド)	June 28, 2018

== Reception ==
The game has been downloaded over 5 million times in Japan.
