= Killing Bites =

Japanese manga series

- First tankōbon volume cover, featuring Hitomi Uzaki

キリングバイツ (Kiringu Baitsu)
- Genre: Action, science fiction
- Manga
- Written by: Shinya Murata
- Illustrated by: Kazuasa Sumita
- Published by: Hero's Inc.
- English publisher: NA: Mangamo
- Magazine: Monthly Hero's (November 30, 2013 – October 30, 2020); Comiplex (November 27, 2020 – present)
- Original run: November 30, 2013 – present
- Volumes: 27
- Anime television series
- Directed by: Yasuto Nishikata
- Produced by: Toshihiro Maeda; Reo Kurosu; Toshiyasu Hayashi; Yoshinori Takeeda; Takayuki Takagi; Masatarō Nishi; Chihaya Imase
- Written by: Aoi Akashiro
- Music by: Yasuharu Takanashi
- Studio: Liden Films
- Licensed by: NA: Sentai Filmworks
- Original network: MBS, TBS, AT-X, BS-TBS, SBS
- Original run: January 13, 2018 – March 31, 2018
- Episodes: 12
- Manga

Desire Overload, Right Inaba!?
- Written by: Kazuasa Sumita
- Published by: Hero's Inc.
- Magazine: Wild Hero's
- Original run: August 21, 2020 – present
- icon

Killing Bites (Japanese: キリングバイツ, Hepburn: Kiringu Baitsu) is a Japanese manga series written by Shinya Murata and illustrated by Kazuasa Sumita. It has been serialized since November 2013 in Hero's Inc.'s seinen manga magazine Monthly Hero's. Its chapters have been collected in 27 tankōbon volumes as of June 2026. A 12-episode anime television series adaptation by Liden Films aired between January and March 2018 on MBS's "Animeism" programming block.

== Plot ==
When attacked by some college students, Hitomi kills all of them except Yūya, who is shocked to see her transform into a beast and battle a lion monster at an abandoned waste facility. These strange people are "Brutes", fighters that have been created to combine the brains of humans and the fangs of beasts. The "Killing Bites" battles have been the decisive turning points in the Japanese economy since ancient times. Hitomi is assigned to protect Yūya.

== Characters ==
Hitomi Uzaki (宇崎 瞳, Uzaki Hitomi)
Voiced by: Sora Amamiya
A girl with white hair who is a honey badger (ratel) hybrid. Her honey badger DNA means she does not feel fear even when facing opponents far larger, stronger and faster than herself in death matches. Her fighting strategy usually involves insulting her opponents into attacking her first, then counterattacking with lethally fast slashing cuts. She has an obvious crush on her guardian, Reiichi Shido, becoming lovestruck in his presence and immediately following any order he gives her. She treats anybody but Reiichi with mild contempt and indifference, frequently forgetting people's names even if they are opponents she has fought in the past, such as Leo. After the Killing Bites tournament, Shido orders her to assassinate Nomoto, much to her resistance.
Yūya Nomoto (野本 裕也, Nomoto Yūya)
Voiced by: Wataru Hatano
A second year university student who was forced into a plot by several classmates to kidnap Hitomi. Following this incident he is forced by Hitomi's guardian, Reiichi Shido, to allow Hitomi to live with him as his bodyguard. In return Yuya must act as Hitomi's financial backer to allow her to take part in death matches against Hybrids belonging to the four Zaibatsu. After the battles, Hitomi attempts to assassinate him, but survives. Learning that he is officially dead, Yuya takes refuge among the hybrids and plans his revenge against Shido and the Zaibatsu. After the series' timeskip, he becomes a Crow Hybrid and starts conspiring to get his vengeance against those who betrayed him, demonstrating a more mature and resolute personality. Hybrids capable of flight are considered very rare and are selected to breed with other hybrids to produce offspring that possess both of their parents' abilities. His feelings toward Hitomi, however, are the same as before and, even though he understands that he, Inui and Kuroi may have to face her one day, he still hopes her to survive and be free from Shido's influence.
Eruza Nakanishi (中西 獲座, Nakanishi Eruza)
Voiced by: Maaya Uchida
She is a Cheetah hybrid specialising in speed type attacks. She is the younger sister of Taiga and represents the Yatsubishi Zaibatsu alongside her brother Taiga. She loses the final match of the first destroyal against Ui in a very unexpected way, and since then her main purpose is to get vengeance against her for having been humiliated in that occasion.
Ui Inaba (稲葉 初, Inaba Ui)
Voiced by: Sumire Uesaka
She is a Rabbit hybrid who has never won a fight and prefers to run away from danger. After the destroyal she becomes worldwide known as the strongest hybrid ever seen, and one of the most respected member of the underground and unrecognized Killing Bites matches. For the same reason however she becomes also a puppet for the elite controlling the new hybrids community, that can force her to do whatever they want to not see her secret about how she won the destroyal publicly revealed.
Ichinosuke Okajima (岡島 壱之助, Okajima Ichinosuke)
Voiced by: Tōru Ōkawa
He is a burly man who is a Hippopotamus Hybrid. He represents the Ishida Zaibatsu with Seira Son as his sponsor.
Taiga Nakanishi (中西 獲座, Nakanishi Taiga)
Voiced by: Yuichi Nakamura
Eruza's older brother and a Tiger hybrid. He represents the Yatsubishi Zaibatsu and sees Yuugo as his rival.
Mai Shinozaki (篠崎 舞, Shinozaki Mai)
Voiced by: Chinatsu Akasaki
She is an overseer of the Death Matches.
Reiichi Shidō (祠堂 零一, Shidō Reiichi)
Voiced by: Rikiya Koyama
Hitomi's legal guardian who orders her to live with and protect Yuya. He frequently uses Hitomi's crush on him to make her obey his orders without question or hesitation. He uses the Death Matches as the testing grounds for his own hybrid research. After obtaining power from the four zaibatsu, he orders Nomoto's assassination and orders Hitomi to execute him, as Nomoto knew too much as well as wanting Hitomi to remove all attachments; not realizing, he would soon make an enemy out of the young man.
Pure Inui (戌井 純, Inui Pyua)
Voiced by: Minami Tanaka
She is a Beagle Hybrid. After a car accident, her dog Nanuupi's DNA has been joined with her to save Pure's life, making her a hybrid. Despite her lack of experience, Pure is quickly turned by Yuya into a powerful warrior thanks to a special training, during which she has learned to fight while instinctively obeying the commands Yuya sends her with a special dog whistle. She tends to trust the others easily (even if she acts with hostility against whoever she senses as a threat for Yuya, following her canine instinct to protect her owner), and despite everyone's skepticism she proves being a powerful and dangerous fighter. After winning the Second Killing Bites preliminary round, she's chosen to take part to the final tournament representing her school.
Tasuku Kuroi (黒井 佑, Kuroi Tasuku)
She is a Tasmanian devil Hybrid. She has a strong personality and her sole purpose is to become stronger than her idol Hitomi. Her dream comes true the moment they fight during the Second Killing Bites, becoming one of the few Hybrids that succeeds in seriously wounding Hitomi while in her final form. Sometimes irritable to Pure's attachment to her, she initially takes the duty to protect her only by Yuya's order, but with time she seems to start becoming attached to her. The Tasmanian devil in her DNA provides her with endless evolution abilities, making her body capable of increasing or decreasing her animal powers by its own according with the opponent's strength. Despite this, she's apparently killed during the second Killing Bites preliminary round by Nodoka.
Haiji Gotō (護藤 ハイジ, Gotō Haiji)
She is an Ibex Hybrid. She has an apatic personality, and since childhood she has always found at ease with high places, until when she met a young Hitomi and they became friends. Both her outstanding agility and ibex' DNA make her able to climb even the steepest slopes without problems, while her powerful horns (which are her pigtails while not transformed) are strong enough to be deadly dangerous for almost any other hybrid.
Yōko Mitsukado (三門 陽湖, Mitsukado Yōko)
Voiced by: Megumi Han
She is the granddaughter of Yozan and believes the Killing Bites have been corrupted by Shidoh's influence. After her defeat at the destroyal, the other Zaibatsu conspire to destroy the Mitsukado family, sending her in ruin and subsequently abandoning her in the hands of Yūgo Tani, who makes her his personal sex slave.
Kaori Rikujō (六条 香織, Rikujō Kaori)
Voiced by: Yū Asakawa
A civet hybrid that uses her pheromones to control others. She represents the Yatsubishi Zaibatsu.
Kaede Kazama (風間 楓, Kazama Kaede)
Voiced by: Takako Honda
A sadistic gecko hybrid who represents the Sumitomo Zaibatsu. After having been defeated by Taiga during the first destroyal she manages to survive the battle, only to be defeated again during the next Killing Bites preliminary round, this time by Haiji Gotoh.
Yōzan Mitsukado (三門 陽参, Mitsukado Yōzan)
Voiced by: Hidekatsu Shibata
He is the President of Mitsukado Zaibatsu. He is Yoko's Grandfather. After his death, the other Zaibatsu organize themselves to gain monopoly over the hybrids-making business, sending the Mitsukado in ruin.
Nodoka Uzaki (宇崎のどか, Uzaki Nodoka)
A human hybrid born by Shidō's experiments of injecting human DNA into a South American sloth. The experiment gave her a human's body and intelligence, but she still presents some traits of her original being (for example, she tends to get tired quickly). In a second moment, Shidō injected her even the DNA of a megatherium, the prehistoric ancestor of the sloth, making her both the first hybrid with three different kinds of DNA and the first one made with the genes of an extinct species. During the Second Killing Bites' preliminary round, the Zaibatsu leaders secretly release her on the fighting field to test her strength, and even if she befriends Pure saving her from other participants she quickly goes berserk, revealing her true form.
Oshie Nodoguro (乃塒 押絵, Nodoguro Oshie)
Voiced by: Sayaka Harada
A minor character used for comic relief after the credits. She has a crush on Hitomi and is portrayed as being similar in behavior to the Greater honeyguide, a species of bird thought to cooperate with honey badgers by leading them to bees nests. However, Oshie usually ends up injured as a result of being around Hitomi because, as the narrator frequently points out, Oshie is human, not a Therianthrope.
Takeshi Kido (城戸 剛, Kido Takeshi)
Voiced by: Ryōkan Koyanagi
A Pangolin hybrid representing the Mitsukado Zaibatsu. He has an unusual fondness for trees and is known for being especially merciless against opponents who have damaged trees during the matches.
Shōta Yabe (矢部 正太, Yabe Shōta)
Voiced by: Yūsuke Kobayashi
A bespectacled young man and a Gorilla hybrid from the Mitsukado Zaibatsu.
Jerome Hongō (ジェロム 本郷, Jeromu Hongō)
Voiced by: Taketora
He is a Bear hybrid specialising in Sumo Wrestling who represents the Mitsukado Zaibatsu.
Den Ōnuma (大沼 電, Ōnuma Den)
Voiced by: Hiroyuki Yoshino
He is a Cobra hybrid with a sadistic personality who enjoys sexually assaulting his female Hybrid opponents while in his transformed Cobra body. He represents the Sumitomo Zaibatsu.
Ryūji Shiina (椎名 竜次, Shiina Ryūji)
Voiced by: Katsuyuki Konishi
He is a Crocodile hybrid representing the Sumitomo Zaibatsu.
Yūgo Tani (谷 優牛, Tani Yūgo)
Voiced by: Yūki Ono
A Lion hybrid representing the Mitsukado Zaibatsu. He was the first opponent Hitomi faces in the series. While ruthless in battle, he can be friendly outside of it.

== Media ==
=== Manga ===
Killing Bites is written by Shinya Murata and illustrated by Kazuasa Sumita. It began serialization in Hero's Inc. seinen manga magazine Monthly Hero's on November 30, 2013. The magazine ceased publication on October 30, 2020, and the series was transferred to Comiplex website, starting publication on November 27, 2020. The first part of the series's final chapter was published on October 12, 2026. Hero's has collected its chapters into individual tankōbon volumes. The first volume was released on September 5, 2014. As of June 29, 2026, 27 volumes have been released.

The manga has been licensed in English by Mangamo.

A spin-off manga series written and illustrated by Sumita, titled Hoshigarisugi Desho!? Inaba-san (Desire Overload, Right Inaba!?), was launched on Wild Hero's website on August 21, 2020. The series will focus on the character, Inaba.

==== Volumes ====
No.	Japanese release date	Japanese ISBN
1	September 5, 2014	978-4-8646-8379-1
2	October 4, 2014	978-4-8646-8383-8
3	March 5, 2015	978-4-8646-8402-6
4	September 5, 2015	978-4-8646-8431-6
5	March 5, 2016	978-4-8646-8452-1
6	September 5, 2016	978-4-8646-8472-9
7	March 4, 2017	978-4-8646-8493-4
8	October 5, 2017	978-4-8646-8521-4
9	January 25, 2018	978-4-8646-8535-1
10	March 5, 2018	978-4-8646-8545-0
11	August 4, 2018	978-4-8646-8582-5
12	December 29, 2018	978-4-8646-8608-2
13	June 5, 2019	978-4-86468-650-1
14	September 5, 2019	978-4-86468-668-6
15	March 5, 2020	978-4-86468-705-8
16	August 5, 2020	978-4-86468-736-2
17	February 27, 2021	978-4-86468-786-7
18	July 29, 2021	978-4-86468-820-8
19	February 28, 2022	978-4-86468-871-0
20	July 29, 2022	978-4-86468-899-4
21	December 27, 2022	978-4-86468-144-5
22	July 28, 2023	978-4-86468-182-7
23	February 28, 2024	978-4-86468-223-7
24	September 28, 2024	978-4-86468-282-4
25	June 30, 2025	978-4-86805-057-5
26	January 29, 2026	978-4-86805-151-0
27	June 29, 2026	978-4-86805-198-5

=== Anime ===
A 12-episode anime television series adaptation by Liden Films aired from January 13 to March 31, 2018, on MBS's "Animeism" programming block. The opening theme is "Killing Bites" by fripSide, and the ending theme is "Kedamono Damono" (ケダモノダモノ) by Kitsunetsuki. Amazon Video streamed the Director's Cut version worldwide. The four Blu-ray releases were released from March 28, 2018, to June 26, 2018. Each release has three episodes inside the disc for a total of 12 episodes. Sentai Filmworks has licensed the series for home video release in North America.

==== Episodes ====
No.	Title (Note: All English episode titles taken from Amazon Video)	Original release date
1	"The One With the Sharper Fangs Will Win"; Transliteration: "Kiba no surudoi hō ga katsu" (Japanese: 牙の鋭い方が勝つ)	January 13, 2018
In Japan, four zaibatsu conglomerates sponsor underground death matches featuring genetically engineered hybrids known as Therianthropes, which combine human intelligence with animal strength. High school student Hitomi Uzaki is kidnapped by assailants intending to rape her, while college student Yūya Nomoto is forced to drive their van. Before Yūya can intervene, Hitomi kills her attackers and compels him to take her to an arena, where she fights a lion hybrid. She wagers Yūya's organs—valuable if harvested—on her victory, then reveals herself as a honey badger hybrid, the world's most fearless animal, and swiftly defeats her opponent. Hitomi's guardian, Reiichi Shidō, explains that the zaibatsu use these matches to attract wealthy investors and gain political and economic influence. Since Hitomi bet Yūya's organs, he becomes her sole investor, enabling her to compete. She is tasked with protecting him, while he receives her 100 million prize money to wager on future fights. Later, another hybrid attacks Yūya to gather information about Hitomi.
2	"Shit, I Might Fall For You"; Transliteration: "Yabbai horechai sō" (Japanese: やっばい惚れちゃいそう)	January 20, 2018
Hitomi arrives to save Yūya. The attacker, Ryoko Araka, is a porcupine hybrid from the Yatsubishi Zaibatsu, capable of firing metallic quills as weapons. Initially intending to kill Yūya to eliminate Hitomi's investor, she instead shifts her focus to killing Hitomi. Their battle reveals that Hitomi's honey badger hide is too durable for Ryoko's quills to penetrate. Before Ryoko can strike again, a hippopotamus hybrid named Ichinosuke Okajima knocks her unconscious and invites Hitomi to join the Ishida Zaibatsu. She refuses until receiving orders from Reiichi Shidō, reluctantly agreeing to represent Ishida in her next death match. Hitomi transfers to Yūya's university, where she encounters Eruza Nakanishi, a cheetah hybrid from Yatsubishi. Eruza provokes Hitomi by stealing her underwear, inciting a brawl that is halted by a Mitsukado Zaibatsu representative. Since Hitomi is scheduled to fight for Ishida, they are forbidden from clashing beforehand. Unseen observers note that all four zaibatsu have marked Hitomi as a target and will likely strike during the upcoming match.
3	"I Really Have No Redeeming Quality"; Transliteration: "Hontto nan no torie mo nain desu" (Japanese: ほんっと何の取り柄もないんです)	January 27, 2018
To conceal their hybrid identities, Hitomi and Eruza pose in cosplay while being photographed by members of the school's photography club. Meanwhile, Yūya returns home to find Leo, the lion hybrid, still alive, accompanied by Yoko Mitsukado—granddaughter of the Mitsukado Zaibatsu's leader. Yoko reveals that Reiichi, Hitomi's guardian, is using the death matches to test his hybrid research and insists Yūya participate as Hitomi's strategist. Annoyed when he agrees—having expected his cowardice to make him refuse—she decides to enter the match herself to ensure Hitomi's death. Since the match requires a three-member team, Ichinosuke attempts to recruit another hybrid but finds only Ui Inaba, a rabbit hybrid with no prior victories. Before she can join, Akemi Kishimoto, a horned lizard hybrid, attacks her, using blood bullets fired from her eyes to prevent others from aiding Ishida. Hitomi intervenes, and Ui's acute hearing helps expose Akemi's hidden twin sister, enabling Hitomi to subdue both. Knowing pre-match combat is forbidden, Hitomi blackmails the sisters into crediting Ui with their defeat. Overjoyed by her first victory, Ui eagerly joins the team.
4	"That's Why I Told You to Stop, You Scum!"; Transliteration: "Da kara yamero to itta no yo kuzu ga!" (Japanese: だから辞めろと言ったのよクズが!)	February 3, 2018
Before the matches begin, Hitomi's team encounters Nakanishi Taiga, a tiger hybrid fighting for the Yatsubishi Zaibatsu. His sister Eruza openly declares her intention to kill Hitomi. The matches are overseen by Reiichi Shidō as director, taking place on Hotei Island in the Philippine Sea. The battle follows a unique system where investors remotely direct their hybrids' movements across the battlefield in a chess-like strategy game. Though initially underestimated by rival investors due to his inexperience, Yūya makes an unexpectedly brilliant move by following Hitomi's subtle hand signals transmitted through the surveillance cameras. In her first match, Hitomi demonstrates overwhelming superiority by instantly defeating Jerome Hongo, a bear hybrid representing the Mitsukado faction, with a single decisive attack. Elsewhere on the battlefield, Ichinosuke temporarily allies with two other hybrids—a gorilla from Mitsukado and a crocodile from Sumitomo—to jointly confront the formidable Taiga.
5	"I'm Free to Have Sex In Any Way I Want"; Transliteration: "Don'nafūni-hanruu to, jiyū" (Japanese: どんな風に犯るうと, 自由)	February 10, 2018
Taiga exploits the jungle terrain to swiftly defeat both Ryuji and Shōta. Meanwhile, Eruza is lured into a camera-blind zone where Kaede Kazama, a gecko hybrid, and Den Omuna, a cobra hybrid, ambush her—with Den attempting to sexually assault her. Though Ichinosuke prepares for a final stand, Taiga receives abrupt orders from his investor to withdraw and rescue Eruza. Before he can disengage, Ryuji clamps his jaws onto Taiga's leg, immobilizing him. Yūya deduces Ryuji's ploy: hybrids who fail to obey investor commands within the time limit are executed via explosive collars. Elsewhere, Ui digs a burrow alone, avoiding detection. Just as Den assaults Eruza, Hitomi—strategically repositioned by Yūya—intervenes. The investors ridicule Yūya for "wasting" Hitomi's move to save an opponent. When cameras refocus on the confrontation, Hitomi struggles against Kaede's unorthodox combat style, which leverages her adhesive fingertips. Seizing the distraction, Eruza slashes Den's face. Forced into a temporary alliance, Hitomi engages Den while Eruza duels Kaede.
6	"Who Cares?"; Transliteration: "Sonna koto, watashi ga shiruka" (Japanese: そんな事、私が知るか)	February 17, 2018
A flashback reveals Den and Kaede were recruited by Sumitomo to participate in the match. Yūya learns that when Shidō assumed control of the matches, he altered the rules to allow criminals like Den to volunteer as hybrids. Meanwhile, Ichinosuke frees Taiga from Ryūji's jaws, enabling him to reach his designated location in time to deactivate his explosive collar. Furious, Ryūji vows revenge against Ichinosuke. Underground, Ui continues digging an elaborate tunnel system. During Hitomi's battle with Den, she attempts to exploit his blinded right eye—unaware he can still track her via his snake tongue's heat-sensing ability. She suddenly collapses, paralyzed by his venom. Simultaneously, Kaede undergoes a monstrous gecko transformation, overwhelming Eruza. Just as Den prepares to assault Hitomi, she overcomes the paralysis and severs his genitals with a single strike. Enraged, Den attacks again, only for Hitomi to bisect him, leaving him incapacitated. Now outnumbered, Kaede struggles against both Hitomi and Eruza. Elsewhere, as Ichinosuke falters against Ryūji, their fight is abruptly interrupted by Kidō, a hybrid sent by Yoko.
7	"Because... That's What I Feel Like!"; Transliteration: "Datte... Sōiu kibun nan dakara" (Japanese: だって...そういう気分なんだから)	February 24, 2018
Kido, revealed as Shōta's teammate, kills Ryūji with a single punch while still in human form, then horrifies observers by brutally desecrating the corpse. When Ichinosuke is ambushed by Shōta, he suddenly vanishes—having fallen into one of Ui's hidden tunnels. Ui emerges nearby, startling Shōta into retreat. Meanwhile, Eruza overpowers Hitomi, poised for the kill, when both abruptly begin kissing violently. They've been drugged by Kaori Rikujo, a civet hybrid whose pheromones induce uncontrollable arousal. Yoko condemns this tactic as dishonorable, her fury mounting as spectators leer at the compromised fighters. Her true motive surfaces: to crush Shidō's reputation by humiliating his hybrids and undermining his sway over her grandfather. The match resumes when Kaede, forced to confront Taiga, is instantly killed. Hitomi suddenly breaks free by channeling her twisted obsession with Shidō, attacking Kaori just as Taiga arrives—setting the stage for a decisive confrontation.
8	"Shit...Shit shit shit shit!!" Transliteration: "Yabai... Yabai Yabai Yabai Yabai!!" (Japanese: やばい...やばいやばいやばいやばい!!)	March 3, 2018
The presidents of the four zaibatsu secretly negotiate to legalize hybrids, intending to monopolize the death matches under whichever conglomerate wins the current game. Unbeknownst to them, Shidō—the mastermind behind hybrid creation—has manipulated events to ensure he retains ultimate control regardless of the outcome. Taiga demands a solo confrontation with Hitomi, refusing assistance from Eruza or Kaori. Meanwhile, Shōta corners Ui but inadvertently destroys part of the forest—triggering Kido's wrath. Enraged, Kido tears Shōta apart but spares Ui, who resolves to aid Hitomi. Taiga discloses his true objective: to defeat Leo, who had deliberately lost to Hitomi earlier, deeming her unworthy of a serious battle. Having dedicated himself to surpassing Leo's strength—and knowing the lion hybrid only fights earnestly against equals—Taiga now seeks to kill Hitomi for the dishonor she inflicted on Leo. As their lethal duel begins, both fighters commit to a battle with no survivors.
9	"I Will Never Change My Mind About That"; Transliteration: "Sore dake wa zettai ni magenai!" (Japanese: それだけは絶対に曲げない!)	March 10, 2018
Yūya reflects on how meeting Hitomi gave purpose to his previously empty life. During her battle with Taiga, Hitomi endures multiple blows while waiting for the perfect counterattack opportunity. Ui arrives to warn Hitomi about Kido's approach, unaware Taiga stands behind her. As Ui flees, she succumbs to Kaori's pheromones and collapses. The investors mock Yūya, blaming his strategy for dooming Hitomi, but he overcomes his fear by focusing on their bond. He deliberately forfeits his turn to move her, allowing her to continue fighting. Just as Hitomi prepares to counter Taiga, Kido's massive, scale-covered tail strikes her. Yūya realizes Yoko manipulated both him—to keep Hitomi in place—and Kido, stoking his hatred for Hitomi. Meanwhile, Ui, though overwhelmed by lust, lures Kaori into one of her tunnels. Hitomi struggles against Kido's impenetrable defenses until Taiga intervenes—yet even his attacks fail to pierce Kido's armor. The battle shifts when Kido fully transforms, encasing his entire body in dense scale armor and revealing his true nature as a pangolin hybrid, leaving all witnesses stunned.
10	"Let's Go Together"; Transliteration: "Issho ni ikou" (Japanese: 一緒に行こう)	March 17, 2018
Hitomi lies unconscious as Taiga desperately attempts to shatter Kido's armored scales, only to be outmaneuvered and lose his right arm. Ichinosuke intervenes, creating a momentary opening that allows Taiga to gouge out Kido's eye. Yet both warriors are ultimately impaled by Kido's lethal strikes. Yoko triumphantly declares victory for Mitsukado—until Hitomi erupts into consciousness, undergoing a terrifying transformation into her ultimate honey badger form. Shidō reveals the truth: while most hybrids are genetically altered humans, Hitomi is an Origin Beast, a natural fusion of species. A flashback unveils Hitomi's origins: seven years prior, Shidō found her living feral in Hong Kong. Through patient effort (and enduring numerous injuries), he earned her trust, named her, and provided care. When colleague Shibayama tranquilized her, leaving them vulnerable to the Liuman Mafia, they were rescued by overseer Shinozaki—an act that sparked Hitomi's devotion to Shidō. Now fully awakened, Hitomi assaults Kido with unprecedented ferocity, her movements eclipsing all previous displays of power as the battle reaches its climax.
11	"Don't Bully Mom"; Transliteration: "Mama wo ... ijimeru na" (Japanese: ママを...いじめるな)	March 24, 2018
Hitomi slashes Kido's unprotected chest before launching him through several trees, destroying them. A flashback reveals Kido associates plant life with memories of his mother, intensifying his distress at their destruction. In retaliation, Kido severs Hitomi's right arm and projects his protective scales outward, forming rows of bladed weapons. He overwhelms Hitomi with brutal strikes until she unexpectedly hurls her own severed limb into his face as a diversion. During the decisive exchange, Hitomi momentarily adopts an expression resembling Kido's mother, causing him to hesitate. She capitalizes on this opening to thrust her remaining arm down his throat. As Yoko collapses in furious disbelief, Kido briefly regains his footing—only for Eruza to deliver a fatal slash to his throat, thereby claiming the title of Killing Bites Champion. The situation takes another unexpected turn when Ui regains consciousness. While attempting to flee from Eruza, she inadvertently executes a perfectly timed somersault kick that renders Eruza unconscious. Overseer Shinozaki consequently declares Ui the new champion. The zaibatsu presidents immediately descend into vehement accusations of rule violations. Their dispute is abruptly interrupted when all electrical systems deactivate. Unobserved by the assembled representatives, chameleon hybrids have infiltrated the island under orders to eliminate all surviving participants. This covert operation ensures the match will conclude without an official victor. The final phase of the conflict begins in total darkness.
12	"Thanks for Everything"; Transliteration: "Ima made Arigato na" (Japanese: 今までありがとな)	March 31, 2018
The Sumitomo-ordered chameleon hybrids are stopped by overseer Shinozaki, who declares Ui champion. Leo assassinates the Sumitomo chairman while Shidō leads a coup with Ishida, Yatsubishi, and Mitsukado dissidents, executing Mitsukado's president to legalize hybrid augmentation. Deposed heir Yoko is enslaved by Leo as punishment for hybrid abuse. Post-tournament, Yūya resumes civilian life until summoned by Hitomi to their original arena. After exchanging gratitude, she executes him per Shidō's orders, though later shown weeping. In the future, hybrids gain acceptance with a dedicated Tokyo Bay city. Non-lethal Killing Bites becomes mainstream entertainment. A final twist reveals Yūya survived and is training two young female hybrids for vengeance against Hitomi, Shidō and the zaibatsu.

=== Video game ===
A video game adaptation for the PlayStation 4 and PlayStation Vita was announced in 2015, developed by Nex Entertainment. The game was delayed in 2016 after the developer was dissolved, and the game's development was later suspended.
