= Sayaka Harada =

Japanese voice actress

- 原田 彩楓
- Born: December 23, 1997 (age 28); Chiba Prefecture, Japan
- Occupation: Voice actress
- Years active: 2015–present
- Notable work: Tawawa on Monday as Ai; Urara Meirocho as Chiya; Aho-Girl as Sayaka Sumino; UQ Holder! as Shinobu Yūki; Do You Love Your Mom and Her Two-Hit Multi-Target Attacks? as Porta
- Height: 158 cm (5 ft 2 in)

Sayaka Harada (原田 彩楓, Harada Sayaka; born December 23, 1997) is a Japanese voice actress who is previously affiliated with Clare Voice. She played leading roles in each series, including Tawawa on Monday, Urara Meirocho, Aho-Girl, UQ Holder!, Do You Love Your Mom and Her Two-Hit Multi-Target Attacks? and The Idolmaster Cinderella Girls.

== Biography ==
Harada was born in Chiba Prefecture. After thinking about what course to take after graduating from high school, she decided to enter a voice acting school in 2015. She had not seen much anime neither manga.

Harada appeared in minor roles in anime series such as Lostorage Incited WIXOSS and Time Bokan 24. She first played a lead role in an anime series as the character Ai-chan in the original net animation short series Tawawa on Monday in 2016. Her next main role was as Chiya, the protagonist of the 2017 anime television series Urara Meirocho. Harada had auditioned for the role, and was given it after a number of re-recordings. She also read the manga afterwards, describing Chiya as a "bright, pure, straightforward, and cute little thing." Harada, Kaede Hondo, Yurika Kubo and Haruka Yoshimura, performed the series' opening theme "Dreaming Labyrinth" (夢路らびりんす, Yumeji Rabirinsu). Her next main role is Miyu Mifune in The Idolmaster Cinderella Girls, a role she reprised from the original game. She also played the role of Sayaka Sumino in Aho-Girl, and will play the role of Shinobu Yūki in the anime television series UQ Holder!. She is one of the cast members singing for the series' opening and ending themes. On July 31, 2019, it was announced that she left Clare Voice to become a freelancer.

== Filmography ==
=== Television animation ===
Year	Title	Role
2017	Urara Meirocho	Chiya
2017	The Idolmaster Cinderella Girls	Miyu Mifune
2017	Aho-Girl	Sayaka Sumino
2017	UQ Holder!	Shinobu Yūki
2017	Land of the Lustrous	Watermelon Tourmaline
2018	The Ryuo's Work Is Never Done!	Mihane Takeuchi
2018	Killing Bites	Oshie Nodoguro
2018	Last Period	Mizaru
2018	Planet With	Nozomi Takamagahara
2018	Yuuna and the Haunted Hot Springs	Chitose Nakai
2018	Uchi no Maid ga Uzasugiru!	Mimika Washizaki
2018	Goblin Slayer	Shoujo Fujutsushi
2018	A Certain Magical Index III	Vilian (Note: Official YenPress romanization of the Japanese name ヴィリアン)
2019	Do You Love Your Mom and Her Two-Hit Multi-Target Attacks?	Porta
2020	Assault Lily Bouquet	Kusumi Egawa
2020	Iwa-Kakeru! Sport Climbing Girls	Kikuko Gotō
2021	I've Been Killing Slimes for 300 Years and Maxed Out My Level	Halkara
2021	Seirei Gensouki: Spirit Chronicles	Miharu Ayase
2024	Blue Archive the Animation	Ayane Okusora

=== OVAs/ONAs ===
- Tawawa on Monday (2016), Ai
- A.I.C.O. -Incarnation- (2018), Yuzuha Isazu
- Tawawa on Monday 2 (2021), Ai

=== Video games ===
- The Idolmaster Cinderella Girls: Starlight Stage (2015), Miyu Mifune
- Azur Lane (2017), Dunkerque, Haruna
- Princess Connect! Re:Dive (2018), Ranpha
- Blue Archive (2021), Ayane Okusora
