= The Elder Sister-like One =

Japanese manga series by Pochi Iida

- First tankōbon volume cover, featuring Chiyo

姉なるもの (Ane Naru Mono)
- Genre: Reverse isekai; Romance; Supernatural comedy
- Manga
- Written by: Pochi Iida
- Published by: ASCII Media Works
- English publisher: NA: Yen Press
- Magazine: Dengeki G's Comic; ComicWalker; Niconico Seiga
- Original run: March 30, 2016 – present
- Volumes: 6

The Elder Sister-like One (Japanese: 姉なるもの, Hepburn: Ane Naru Mono) is a Japanese manga series by Pochi Iida, based on the adult doujinshi of the same title. It began serialization in ASCII Media Works's seinen manga magazine Dengeki G's Comic in 2016, before it was moved online to the ComicWalker and Niconico Seiga websites in 2019 after Dengeki G's Comic ceased publication. It has been collected in six tankōbon volumes. The manga is licensed in North America by Yen Press.

== Plot ==
The manga follows a young boy, Yuu, and his daily domestic life with a supernatural being, the "Sister of the Woods with a Thousand Young" or, as she names herself, "Chiyo". Having lost his parents in a car crash when he was five years old, Yuu drifts between the foster homes of uncaring, disdainful relatives, leading to a lonely existence where he hides his feelings to placate others and avoid getting kicked out.

After ending up at the residence of his indifferent yet not outright contemptuous uncle, who is hospitalized during the course of the story, Yuu explores the storeroom that his uncle warned him not to explore—the sole condition of his permission to live onsite. Within the storeroom, Yuu accidentally summons Chiyo, an eldritch-like being with the horns and legs of a goat and tentacle-like tendrils, who Yuu mistakes for an angel as she asks him what he wishes for the most, in return for what he values most. As Chiyo's demonic presence overwhelms Yuu, his fear forces his thoughts to focus on his foremost desire: the warmth of a family member. Yuu requests for Chiyo to become his elder sister, which Chiyo accepts, sealing the contract with a kiss.

Yuu faints from the experience, waking up the next morning in his room with Chiyo, who now appears as a regular human woman, at his futon-side. Yuu panics, shocked at Chiyo's non-monstrous appearance, but she reassures him that their contract was not a dream, and simply asks that he call her "Sis". Thus, their days as "Little Brother" and "Big Sister" begin.

The manga portrays slices of the pair's life, with Chiyo's occasional humorous regression into her monster form and associated habits, along with heartwarming moments of the growing connection between the two, bringing joy, emotion, and a renewed lease on life for the young and orphaned Yuu.

== Media ==
=== Manga ===
The series began serialization in the May 2016 issue of ASCII Media Works's Dengeki G's Comic on March 30. It was then moved online to the ComicWalker and Niconico Seiga websites in April 2019 after Dengeki G's Comic ceased publication after its May 2019 issue. The manga is licensed in North America by Yen Press. As of March 2022, six tankōbon volumes have been released.

No.	Original release date	Original ISBN	English release date	English ISBN
1	December 17, 2016	978-4-04-892477-1	April 10, 2018	978-0-31-648062-8
2	August 25, 2017	978-4-04-893309-4	June 26, 2018	978-1-97-530128-6
3	August 27, 2018	978-4-04-912013-4	April 30, 2019	978-1-97-530419-5
4	January 10, 2020	978-4-04-912987-8	September 22, 2020	978-1-97-531593-1
5	December 26, 2020	978-4-04-913587-9	November 9, 2021	978-1-97-533603-5
6	March 26, 2022	978-4-04-914293-8	January 17, 2023	978-1-97-536177-8

=== Original video animation ===
An original video animation (OVA) adaptation was announced in January 2020.

== Reception ==
In 2017, The Elder Sister-like One placed sixth in the 3rd Next Manga Award in the printed comics category.

As part of Anime News Network's Spring 2018 manga guide, Rebecca Silverman, Amy McNulty, and Lynzee Loveridge reviewed the first volume. Silverman and Loveridge praised the plot and characters, while all three critics criticized it for being generic at times.

== See also ==
- Do You Love Your Mom and Her Two-Hit Multi-Target Attacks?, a light novel series also illustrated by Pochi Iida
