= Urara Meirocho =

Japanese manga and anime series

- First tankōbon volume cover, featuring Chiya

うらら迷路帖
- Genre: Comedy; Slice of life; Supernatural
- Manga
- Written by: Harikamo
- Published by: Houbunsha
- Magazine: Manga Time Kirara Miracle! (2014–17); Manga Time Kirara (2018–19)
- Original run: April 16, 2014 – June 8, 2019
- Volumes: 7
- Anime television series
- Directed by: Youhei Suzuki
- Produced by: Junichiro Tanaka; Kei Fukura; Hiroyuki Kobayashi; Yuji Matsukura; Jiro Yamazaki; Takaaki Nakame
- Written by: Deko Akao
- Music by: Natsumi Tabuchi; Nagare Nakamura Satoshi Takano
- Studio: J.C.Staff
- Licensed by: NA: Sentai Filmworks
- Original network: TBS, CBC, SUN, BS-TBS, TBS Channel 1
- English network: SEA: Animax
- Original run: January 5, 2017 – March 23, 2017
- Episodes: 12
- icon

Urara Meirocho (うらら迷路帖, Urara Meirochō; lit. 'Book of Urara Labyrinth') is a Japanese four-panel manga series by Harikamo. It was serialized in Houbunsha's Manga Time Kirara Miracle! from April 2014 to October 2017, when the magazine ceased its publication, and continued in Manga Time Kirara from January 2018 to June 2019. Its chapters were collected in seven tankōbon volumes. A 12-episode anime television series by J.C. Staff aired between January and March 2017.

== Plot ==
Meirocho is a town filled with fortune tellers known as Uraras, who each specialize in different forms of fortune telling. Chiya, a girl who was raised in the woods, comes to Meirocho seeking the whereabouts of her mother. Joined by three other Urara trainees, Koume, Kon, and Nono, Chiya aims to become the highest ranked Urara in order to enlist the help of the legendary Urara and find her mother.

== Characters ==
Chiya (千矢)
Voiced by: Sayaka Harada
A girl who sometimes appears to have animal-like ears and a tail. She was raised in the woods by her mother's friend, Setsu. Having grown up alongside animals, she is quite agile and has a habit of exposing her stomach when apologising. She wishes to become a 1st-rank Urara to find her mother.
Kon Tatsumi (巽 紺, Tatsumi Kon)
Voiced by: Kaede Hondo
A straight-laced girl who specializes in kokkuri fortune telling. Due to the way she wears her ribbon, she is often thought to be a fox girl.
Koume Yukimi (雪見 小梅, Yukimi Koume)
Voiced by: Yurika Kubo
An energetic girl who dresses like a witch and specializes in witch-related magic.
Nono Natsume (棗 ノノ, Natsume Nono)
Voiced by: Haruka Yoshimura
A shy girl who is the younger sister of the Natsumeya's owner, Nina. She owns a doll named Matsuko given to her by her mother, who died when she was little, and often interprets its creepy advices.
Nina Natsume (棗 ニナ, Natsume Nina)
Voiced by: Ai Kayano
Nono's older sister, a Rank 5 Urara who runs the Natsumeya teahouse and tutors 10th-rank Uraras.
Saku Iroi (色井 佐久, Iroi Saku)
Voiced by: Ayaka Suwa
Captain of Meirocho's Bloque 10 Patrol Unit who is close friends with Nina. She is strict in her duties and often embarrassed by Chiya's shameless actions.
Ōshima (大島) and Shiozawa (塩沢)
Voiced by: Yuka Takakura and Hitomi Sasaki
Patrol officers working under Saku, whom they both have quite evident crushes on.
Setsu (セツ)
Voiced by: Yūko Kaida
A friend of Chiya's mother who raised Chiya in the forest after her mother's disappearance.
Narration
Voiced by: Kikuko Inoue

== Media ==
=== Manga ===
Written and illustrated by Harikamo, Urara Meirocho started in Houbunsha's Manga Time Kirara Miracle! on April 16, 2014. The magazine ceased publication on October 16, 2017, and the series moved to the publisher's Manga Time Kirara starting on January 9, 2018, and finished on June 8, 2019. Houbunsha collected its chapters in seven tankōbon volumes, released from January 27, 2015, to July 25, 2019.

==== Volumes ====
No.	Release date	ISBN
1	January 27, 2015	978-4-8322-4517-4
2	November 27, 2015	978-4-8322-4636-2
3	May 27, 2016	978-4-8322-4696-6
4	January 27, 2017	978-4-8322-4796-3
5	December 27, 2017	978-4-8322-4904-2
6	October 25, 2018	978-4-8322-4987-5
7	July 25, 2019	978-4-8322-7109-8

=== Anime ===
An anime television series adaptation by J.C.Staff aired in Japan between January 5, 2017, and March 23, 2017. The series is licensed in North America by Sentai Filmworks and streamed by Anime Network. The opening theme is "Yumeji Labyrinth" (夢路らびりんす) by Labyrinth (Sayaka Harada, Yurika Kubo, Haruka Yoshimura, and Kaede Hondo) while the ending theme is "go to Romance>>>>>" by Luce Twinkle Wink☆.

==== Episodes ====
No.	Title (Note: All English episode titles are taken from Anime Network.)	Original release date
1	"The Fortune-Teller Girl Sometimes Shows Her Stomach" "Shōjo to Uranai, Tokidoki Onaka" (少女と占い、時々おなか)	January 5, 2017
Having just turned fifteen, a mountain girl named Chiya arrives in Meirocho, a town of fortune tellers known as Uraras, immediately getting in trouble after her animal friends steal food from the marketplace. While escaping from the captain of the 10th Bloque Patrol Unit, Saku Iroi, Chiya meets two other girls, Kon Tatsumi and Koume Yukimi, who have both come to Meirocho to become Urara apprentices at the Natsume-ya teahouse where Chiya was also summoned to. Although Saku threatens to kick them out of town, the girls are saved by the Natsume-ya's owner, Nina Natsume, who introduces them to her younger sister, Nono. Nina then demonstrates her talents by performing some tea-leaf fortune telling with Chiya. Learning about the ranking system Urara go through, Chiya asks Kon to use her kokkuri-style fortune telling to determine what style she should go for, only to be left with a rather cryptic clue.
2	"The Things We Search For and Our Dreams are Sometimes Sweet!" "Sagashimono to Yume, Tokidoki Kanmi" (探し物と夢、時々甘味)	January 12, 2017
Chiya explains that she came to Meirocho to look for her mother, despite knowing pretty much nothing about her. With no information on hand, Nina informs her that the only one who could use divination to find her mother is a legendary Rank 1 Urara living in Bloque 1, which is off-limits to low ranking Uraras. That night, Chiya attempts to sneak into Bloque 1 but is stopped by Saku, who encourages her to instead aim to become a Rank 1 Urara who can go there legally. The next day, Nina teaches the girls to do paper lantern fortune telling, informing them of an absolute rule that Urara must never divine the fortunes of gods. While attempting the fortune, Chiya hears a voice calling her, leading to her hair getting singed. Kon suspects this may have been a voice from the gods, with both girls promising to become Rank 1 Urara.
3	"Our Friends and Colleagues are Sometimes Rivals" "Nakama to Tomodachi, Tokidoki Raibaru" (仲間と友達、時々ライバル)	January 19, 2017
While out on an errand to a divination store run by an old lady named Benten, the girls accidentally break a crystal ball and have to work at the store to pay it off. Not wanting to spend a year away from Urara training, Chiya faces against Benten in a dice gamble, managing to waive the debt and return with their errand. Later, Chiya gets her hair stuck in Koume's shirt button, with both girls refusing to cut either to get free. As the two end up having to work together to move around, Koume, realising she knows nothing about Chiya, rips off her shirt buttons and declares Chiya a friend and rival. Afterwards, Chiya explains how she got her fear of having her hair cut, wanting to learn more about her friends.
4	"Good and Bad Things are Sometimes Ticklish" "Ii Koto Warui Koto, Tokidoki Kusuguttai" (良いこと悪いこと、時々くすぐったい)	January 26, 2017
Upon getting caught up in a rainstorm, the girls take shelter in an abandoned building. Despite everyone being afraid following bad omens they've experienced throughout the day, they are cheered up by Chiya's enthusiasm and find beauty in the storm. Later, the girls study up on mole divination for a remedial exam, using Kon's body as a reference. As Nono expresses how she doesn't want to stay in Nina's shadow, Chiya adds her own mole on her as a good luck charm.
5	"Brides and Gods Sometimes Sneeze" "Hanayome to Kami-sama, Tokidoki Hakkushun" (花嫁と神様、時々はっくしゅん)	February 2, 2017
The girls participate in the annual Wedding Kimono Festival, in which all the Uraras dress up as brides to appease the gods. During the festival, Chiya gets drunk off the smell of alcohol and starts releasing pheremones affecting both animals and the other girls. Winding up in the meadows, Chiya encounters a strange black, furry figure before passing out. As Chiya ends up with a cold as a result, Kon starts to ponder if Chiya has the ability to see gods, feeling a sense of jealousy that Nina states is normal.
6	"Love and Pursuit Sometimes Go 'Good Girl, Good Girl!'" "Koi to Tsuiseki, Tokidoki Yōshi Yoshi Yoshi" (恋と追跡、時々よーしよしよし)	February 9, 2017
Noticing that Nina is searching for love, Koume decides to try and find her a soulmate using pendulum divination. As the girls follow Koume's pendulum around town, Saku, worried about what they are up to, disguises herself to follow them, getting mistaken for a handsome man. After Chiya eventually manages to recognise her, the girls deduce that Saku is the best soulmate for Nina. Later, as the girls practise kokkuri divination, Kon becomes possessed by a kitsune spirit, though her spiritual powers prove futile against Chiya's petting. Initially wanting to make Chiya her bride, the spirit eventually respects Chiya's wishes to have her friend back and returns Kon's body.
7	"Invocations and Witches Sometimes Have to Be Ready" "Norito to Majo, Tokidoki Kakugo" (祝詞と魔女、時々覚悟)	February 16, 2017
As the girls try to memorise ancient incantations, Nono recalls one incantation from a lullaby Nina and her mother used to sing for her, deciding to put the other incantations into song to both memorize them and improve her confidence. Later, Koume explains how she met a witch from France named Marie Quispilquette, who came to live with her when she was five years old, discovering that she could perform real magic. However, when a rumor about a witch spreading an illness around town began, Marie was forced to return to France, leaving Koume with her hat and broom, along with a determination to become the most powerful witch in the country.
8	"Forbidden Things are Sometimes Totally Naked!" "Ikenai Koto to Wakannai Koto, Tokidoki Suppokopon" (いけないこととわかんないこと、時々スッぽこぽん)	February 23, 2017
The girls go to the river in the forest for some swimming, where Kon expresses her desire to attempt a spring séance that allows two compatible Uraras to share their power. As Kon attempts the séance with Chiya, they both start to see visions of strange creatures. Believing that the power she borrowed from Chiya was the ability to see gods, Kon fears that she may have committed the taboo of using divination to witness a god's true form and could lose her Urara powers as a result. As Chiya promises to stay by her side and help her achieve her dream no matter what, Kon's friends help her perform a kokkuri divination, which tells her that she hasn't committed a sin and can continue being an Urara, leaving the question of what they actually saw in the river a mystery.
9	"Mothers and Knowledge are Sometimes for You!" "Haha to Kokoroe, Tokidoki Anata no Tame" (母と心得、時々あなたのため)	March 2, 2017
While lost somewhere in Meirocho, Chiya is rescued from a swindler by a Rank 2 Urara named Tokie, who offers to take her back to Natsume-ya. Tokie decides to use crystal ball divination to get to know Chiya, only for her crystal ball to break when she attempts to look into what Chiya is searching for; her mother. Upon arriving back at the Natsume-ya, Tokie, revealed to be Kon's mother, warns everyone about an unknown calamity that will befall Nono come midnight. As the girls try to find a way to avert this calamity, Chiya suggests that they search for barberries to use for a protective charm. As their search leads well into the night, the girls remain determined to protect Nono by the time midnight comes. It is at this point that Tokie reveals that her prophecy was actually a preliminary exam for becoming Rank 9 Uraras, which everyone passes thanks to their camaraderie.
10	"Four Girls and the Ranking Exam are Sometimes a Trial" "Yonin to Shōkakushiken, Tokidoki Shiren" (四人と昇格試験、時々試練)	March 9, 2017
The girls participate in the Rank 9 Promotional Exam, in which they must compete with other teams to retrieve a key from inside a labyrinth. As the girls come up against various traps laid out by the teachers, everyone uses each of their talents to find the key. Just as everyone starts heading towards the exit, mysterious monsters appear and capture Chiya.
11	"Chiya and the Dark Sometimes Cry" "Chiya to Kurō, Tokidoki Namida" (千矢とくろう、時々涙)	March 16, 2017
The mysterious captors claim that Chiya's mother, named Yami, is a traitor and attempt to kill Chiya. Recalling what Kon prophesied while looking into her ideal divination method, Chiya manages to call upon the black spirit from before, Kurou, who protects her from the attackers and shows her visions of Yami. With only fifteen minutes left in the exam, Chiya uses Kurou's power to reunite with the others and get them to the exit in time, passing the exam and officially becoming Rank 9 Uraras.
12	"Baths and Celebrations Sometimes Have Smiles!" "Ofuro to Oiwai, Tokidoki Egao" (お風呂とお祝い、時々笑顔)	March 23, 2017
The girls all go to a hot spring inn to celebrate their promotion to Rank 9 Uraras, trying on each other's outfits while in the changing room. After relaxing and doing party drinks in the hot springs, the girls return to the changing rooms to discover that their Rank 9 emblems and divination items have all been stolen. Following various trails, the girls manage to find their missing items behind a waterfall, with Nina revealing she had taken them there to be purified before the girls move out of the Natsumeya to study in the Ninth District. Despite being unable to summon Kurou since the exam, Chiya remains confident that she'll see her mother some day and looks forward to heading to the Ninth District with everyone.

=== Video game ===
Characters from the series appear alongside other Manga Time Kirara characters in the 2017 mobile RPG, Kirara Fantasia.
