= Do You Love Your Mom and Her Two-Hit Multi-Target Attacks? =

Japanese light novel series

- The cover of the first light novel volume featuring the protagonist's titular mother, Mamako Oosuki

通常攻撃が全体攻撃で二回攻撃のお母さんは好きですか? (Tsūjō Kōgeki ga Zentai Kōgeki de ni Kai Kōgeki no Okā-san wa Suki Desuka?)
- Genre: Adventure; Fantasy comedy; Isekai
- Light novel
- Written by: Dachima Inaka
- Illustrated by: Pochi Iida
- Published by: Fujimi Shobo
- English publisher: NA: Yen Press
- Imprint: Fujimi Fantasia Bunko
- Original run: January 20, 2017 – April 17, 2020
- Volumes: 11
- Manga
- Written by: Dachima Inaka
- Illustrated by: Meicha
- Published by: Kadokawa Shoten
- English publisher: NA: Yen Press
- Magazine: Young Ace Up
- Original run: September 26, 2017 – January 18, 2021
- Volumes: 5
- Anime television series
- Directed by: Yoshiaki Iwasaki
- Produced by: Yuuji Matsukura; Nobuhiro Nakayama; Tomoyuki Oowada; Yoshiyuki Shioya; Toshiya Niikura; Chihaya Imase; Takumi Morii; Masaru Takahashi; Hisanori Numano
- Written by: Deko Akao
- Music by: Keiji Inai
- Studio: J.C.Staff
- Licensed by: NA: Aniplex of America
- Original network: Tokyo MX, GTV, GYT, BS11, AT-X, MBS, TVA, NCC
- Original run: July 13, 2019 – September 28, 2019
- Episodes: 12 + OVA
- icon

Do You Love Your Mom and Her Two-Hit Multi-Target Attacks?, (Note: Japanese: 通常攻撃が全体攻撃で二回攻撃のお母さんは好きですか?, Hepburn: Tsūjō Kōgeki ga Zentai Kōgeki de ni Kai Kōgeki no Okā-san wa Suki Desuka? "Do You Like Mothers Who Have Normal Attacks and Double Attacks?") also simply referred to as Okaa-san Online, (Note: Japanese: お母さんオンライン, Hepburn: Okā-san Onrain) is a Japanese light novel series written by Dachima Inaka and illustrated by Pochi Iida. It was published by Fujimi Shobo under its Fujimi Fantasia Bunko imprint from January 2017 to April 2020 for a total of eleven volumes. The story focuses on teenager Masato Oosuki's relationship with his mother Mamako as they are both transported to a fantasy world within an online game.

A manga adaptation by Meicha was serialized in Kadokawa Shoten's digital manga magazine Young Ace Up from September 2017 to January 2021. Both the light novel and manga are licensed in North America by Yen Press. An RPG browser game based on the series was released in April 2017. An anime television series adaptation by J.C.Staff aired from July to September 2019, with an original video animation (OVA) episode released in March 2020, the same month a collaborative study book was launched. The anime is licensed in North America by Aniplex of America.

== Premise ==
Masato Oosuki is a teenager who is usually annoyed by his overly doting mother, Mamako, until both are teleported to a fantasy-themed world inside an online game. Masato tries his hardest to show his prowess inside the game, but constantly finds himself flustered by the fact that his mother possesses much higher stats, thus she can easily defeat all opponents with her twin swords, leaving little room for him to act. On their way, they befriend three girls who join their party. As they take quests inside the game, they later discover that it was originally designed to help strengthen the bonds between parents and their children.

== Characters ==
Mamako Oosuki (大好 真々子, Ōsuki Mamako)
Voiced by: Ai Kayano
Mamako is Masato's mother. She comes across as giddy and silly, but is very loving, doting, and caring of her son, so much so that it frequently annoys him. She carries two swords that are extremely powerful. She treats the other members of their party as her own adoptive children.
Masato Oosuki (大好 真人, Ōsuki Masato)
Voiced by: Haruki Ishiya
Masato is a teenager who was enthusiastic about the move to the video game world. However, he does not like when his mother interferes or succeeds at everything he wants to do. Over the course of the series, he slowly grows to appreciate everything his mother does for him.
Wise (ワイズ, Waizu)
Voiced by: Sayumi Suzushiro
Wise is a member of Masato's party and a mage. She is very proud and occasionally spiteful, but has been known to display a kinder side. Her own mother appears as a powerful, man-charming adversary who abandoned Wise once she found out she was much stronger than her daughter. Her real name is Genya (玄夜, Gen'ya).
Porta (ポータ, Pōta)
Voiced by: Sayaka Harada
Porta is a member of Masato's party and a craftsman. She is supportive of Masato and his mother, and is shown to be adept in collecting and storing items. Her real name is Moeko Hotta (堀田 萌子, Hotta Moeko).
Medhi (メディ, Medi)
Voiced by: Lynn
Medhi is a classmate of Masato's at the in-game school. She is kind to Masato and is shown to be very powerful mage in her own right. Her mother is very strict and interferes at every available chance to ensure Medhi succeeds at every task. If one of the plans backfire, Medhi mutters snide and derogatory remarks under her breath about how she actually despises her mother. Her real name is Airi (愛莉).
Masumi Shirase (白瀬 真澄, Shirase Masumi)
Voiced by: Satomi Arai
Shirase is the distributor of the video game world. She appears frequently over the course of the series as different authoritative characters, who have the same name as her. She speaks matter-of-factly and informs Masato's party of their next destination. A running gag in the series involves her being found lying dead in coffins during the game.
Kazuno (カズノ)
Voiced by: Ryoka Yuzuki
Kazuno is Wise's mother and the first boss encountered. She sees her daughter as a burden and rejects her. Kazuno also was very popular with men when she was younger, and sees the game primarily as a way to hook up with younger men that she loves. She uses magic to keep her young looking and make the men around her handsome. She is also known as the Empress of the Night (夜の女帝, Yoru no Jotei).
Medhimama (メディママ, Medimama)
Voiced by: Mai Nakahara
Medhimama is Medhi's mother. She likes to brag about her daughter and will do anything to ensure that she is the best. Unbeknownst to Medhimama, however, her overbearing nature has cause Medhi to despise her.
Amante (アマンテ)
Voiced by: Natsumi Fujiwara^{Ep. 9 credits}
Amante is a member of an anti-mother party called "Ribele" (リベーレ, Ribēre). She is known as the Betrayer of Mothers because she does not like how the game favors mothers. As such, she wants to get rid of them.

== Media ==
=== Light novel ===
The Do You Love Your Mom and Her Two-Hit Multi-Target Attacks? light novel series is written by Dachima Inaka, with illustrations provided by Pochi Iida. It started publication under Fujimi Shobo's imprint Fujimi Fantasia Bunko, with the first volume released on January 20, 2017, while the last volume was released on April 17, 2020, making a total of 11 volumes published. During their panel at Sakura-Con on March 31, 2018, North American publisher Yen Press announced that they had licensed the series for an English version, which was translated by Andrew Cunningham, and released from November 27, 2018, to November 16, 2021.

Japanese voice actress Ai Kayano provided the voice of Mamako Oosuki, the titular mother, in a series of promotions for Do You Love Your Mom and Her Two-Hit Multi-Target Attacks?; Kayano would eventually reprise her role in the anime adaptation. As part of a promotional campaign for the series, Animate announced that they would give away a 16-page short story booklet to anyone who brought their mother to purchase one of the four winners of the 29th Fantasia Prizes.

=== Manga ===
A manga adaptation of Do You Love Your Mom and Her Two-Hit Multi-Target Attacks?, written and illustrated by Meicha, was serialized in Kadokawa Shoten's digital manga magazine Young Ace Up from September 26, 2017, to January 18, 2021. The series was also serialized on Kadokawa's Comic Walker platform. Kadokawa Shoten has compiled the chapters into five individual tankōbon volumes, published from August 25, 2018, to February 4, 2021. The manga is also licensed in North America by Yen Press, with the first volume published on September 3, 2019, while the fifth and final volume was released on January 18, 2022.

=== Anime ===
An anime television series adaptation was announced at the "Fantasia Bunko Dai Kanshasai 2018" event on October 21, 2018. The series was directed by Yoshiaki Iwasaki and written by Deko Akao, with animation by studio J.C.Staff. Yohei Yaegashi provided the series' character designs. Keiji Inai composed the music. It ran for 12 episodes from July 13 to September 28, 2019, on Tokyo MX and other channels. (Note: Tokyo MX listed the series premiere at 24:00 on July 12, 2019, which is effectively July 13 at midnight JST.) Spira Spica performed the series' opening theme song "Iya yo Iya yo Mosuki no Uchi", (Note: イヤヨイヤヨモスキノウチ) while Ai Kayano performed the series' ending theme song "Tsūjou Kōgeki ga Zentai Kōgeki de ni Kai Kōgeki Mama". (Note: 通常攻撃が全体攻撃で二回攻撃ママ) An additional OVA episode is bundled with the series' sixth Blu-ray volume, which was released on March 25, 2020. Aniplex of America has licensed the series.

=== Web radio ===
A web radio show based on Do You Love Your Mom and Her Two-Hit Multi-Target Attacks? and hosted by Ai Kayano was broadcast every Wednesday and Friday starting on June 5, 2019.

=== Video game ===
A RPG browser game adaptation of Do You Love Your Mom and Her Two-Hit Multi-Target Attacks?, developed by Atsumaru in collaboration with Urufu, was released on April 20, 2017, the same date the second volume in the series was published.

=== Other media ===
A collaborative study book titled Let's Study English with Your Mom was launched in Japan on March 28, 2020. It is intended to help junior high level students with their English courses by featuring characters from the series explaining conversational English and grammar, as well as presenting complete sentences in English, within the book. Furthermore, customers that purchase the book are able to download bonus audio recordings by Kayano, in addition to receive a review quiz.

== Reception ==
=== Popularity ===
Prior to its print debut, Do You Love Your Mom and Her Two-Hit Multi-Target Attacks? won the 29th annual Fantasia Grand Prize, an award given to novels published under the Fujimi Fantasia Bunko label. Within the first nine days of its release, the first volume of the series had sold over 12,889 copies. As of May 2017, the first two volumes had sold a combined 100,000 copies, while the series had over 800,000 copies in circulation as of December 2019. In 2019, as reported by Crunchyroll, the anime website Charapedia held a fan poll between June 6 and 19 to identify the most anticipated anime series of the summer 2019 season; Do You Love Your Mom and Her Two-Hit Multi-Target Attacks? came in sixth place with 350 votes. The series has also inspired many memes on the internet.

=== Critical response ===
Reviewing the first two episodes of the anime, Steve Jones of Anime News Network gave the series a 3 out of 5 star rating, saying it "emerges as an odd beast to pin down", while also commenting that its comedy "[has] definitely been hitting more often than the average isekai", with Jones admitting he had fun watching the episodes. In another review, Jones remarked how he enjoyed the series mostly because of its fan service. He also stated, "Do You Love Your Mom continues to function as a reasonably amusing self-aware isekai romp with plenty of motherly cheesecake to titillate its audience, but in no way do I trust it to say anything meaningful about motherhood without tripping over itself." In a third review, Jones highlighted how the anime addresses real-life issues related to abusive parent-child relationships, as, according to him, "It's good to try and address abusive parenting."

Bipin Adhikari of Comic Book Resources expressed his opinion that the series is "as hysterical as the name suggests". The review anime website Beneath the Tangles wrote, "Do You Love Your Mom and Her Two-Hit Multi-Target Attacks? offers a fun play on the usual light novel shenanigans by saddling the hapless male protagonist with his doting mother. This does offer some amusing comedy. However, the [series] does also offer a nice glimpse at a deeper them [sic] of motherhood and managing the bond between a mother and a teenage child who's starting to want some independence."

Allen Moody of THEM Anime Reviews gave the anime a 2 out of 5 star rating, criticizing the series for its absurdly long title and dynamics between the characters.

== See also ==
- The Elder Sister-like One, a manga series written and illustrated by Pochi Iida

== Notes ==
Explanatory

Japanese
