= KonoSuba: An Explosion on This Wonderful World! =

Japanese light novel series

- Cover art of the first volume featuring Megumin

この素晴らしい世界に爆焔を！ (Kono Subarashii Sekai ni Bakuen o!)
- Genre: Adventure, fantasy comedy
- Light novel
- Written by: Natsume Akatsuki
- Illustrated by: Kurone Mishima
- Published by: Kadokawa Shoten
- English publisher: NA: Yen Press
- Imprint: Kadokawa Sneaker Bunko
- Original run: July 1, 2014 – June 1, 2015
- Volumes: 3
- Manga
- Written by: Natsume Akatsuki
- Illustrated by: Kasumi Morino
- Published by: Media Factory
- English publisher: NA: Yen Press
- Magazine: Monthly Comic Alive
- Original run: May 27, 2016 – December 27, 2017
- Volumes: 5
- Light novel

KonoSuba: An Explosion on this Wonderful World! Bonus Story
- Written by: Natsume Akatsuki
- Illustrated by: Kurone Mishima
- Published by: Kadokawa Shoten
- English publisher: NA: Yen Press
- Imprint: Kadokawa Sneaker Bunko
- Original run: December 28, 2016 – March 1, 2019
- Volumes: 2
- Manga

Konosuba: Even More Explosions on This Wonderful World!
- Written by: Natsume Akatsuki
- Illustrated by: Kasumi Morino
- Published by: Media Factory
- English publisher: NA: Yen Press
- Magazine: Monthly Comic Alive
- Original run: February 27, 2018 – May 27, 2020
- Volumes: 4
- Anime television series
- Directed by: Takaomi Kanasaki; Yujiro Abe
- Written by: Makoto Uezu
- Music by: Masato Kōda
- Studio: Drive
- Licensed by: Crunchyroll; SEA: Medialink
- Original network: Tokyo MX, TVA, BS11, KBS Kyoto, SUN
- Original run: April 6, 2023 – June 22, 2023
- Episodes: 12
- icon

KonoSuba: An Explosion on This Wonderful World! (Japanese: この素晴らしい世界に爆焔を！, Hepburn: Kono Subarashii Sekai ni Bakuen o!) is a Japanese light novel trilogy by Natsume Akatsuki, a spin-off of his KonoSuba: God's Blessing on This Wonderful World! series. It is illustrated by Kurone Mishima. It received a manga adaptation and a two-volume light novel sequel KonoSuba: An Explosion on this Wonderful World! Bonus Story (which received a manga adaptation published in English under the name Konosuba: Even More Explosions on This Wonderful World!). The light novels and manga have been published in English by Yen Press. An anime television series adaptation produced by Drive aired between April and June 2023.

== Plot ==
It depicts Megumin's past before she met Kazuma and Aqua, showing how she met Yunyun, gained her explosion magic, and began her adventuring career.

== Characters ==
| Character | Japanese | English |
|---|---|---|
| Megumin | Rie Takahashi | Erica Mendez |
| Yunyun | Aki Toyosaki | Kayli Mills |
| Komekko | Maria Naganawa | Jackie Lastra |
| Arue | Kaori Nazuka | Marissa Lenti |
| Funifura | Miyu Tomita | Reba Buhr |
| Dodonko | Sayumi Suzushiro | Ryan Bartley |
| Nerimaki | Shizuka Ishigami | Michelle Marie |
| Chomusuke | Hitomi Nabatame | Ryan Bartley |
| Pucchin | Mitsuhiro Sakamaki | Joe J. Thomas |
| Cecily | Fairouz Ai | Amanda Lee |
| Zesta | Yasunori Masutani | Mick Lauer |
| Narrator (Kazuma Satou) | Jun Fukushima | Arnie Pantoja |

== Media ==
=== Light novels ===
The Megumin-focused spin-off light novel series is written and illustrated by Akatsuki and Mishima respectively, titled KonoSuba: An Explosion on This Wonderful World! (この素晴らしい世界に爆焔を！, Kono Subarashii Sekai ni Bakuen o!; lit. "Give Explosions to This Wonderful World!") and takes place a year prior to the main series, was released from July 1, 2014, to June 1, 2015, in three volumes. A two-volume sequel, KonoSuba: An Explosion on This Wonderful World! Bonus Story, (続・この素晴らしい世界に爆焔を！, Zoku: Kono Subarashii Sekai ni Bakuen o!; lit. "Sequel: Give Explosions to This Wonderful World!") was released on December 28, 2016, and March 1, 2019.

==== KonoSuba: An Explosion on this Wonderful World! ====
| No. | Title | Original release date | English release date |
|---|---|---|---|
| 1 | Megumin's Turn; Megumin no Tān (めぐみんのターン) | July 1, 2014; 978-4-04-101866-8 | December 24, 2019; 978-1-97-535960-7 |
1. Wizards with Crimson Eyes (紅い瞳の魔法使い達(ウィザーズ), Akai Hitomi no Wizāzu); 2. Lonely Masters of the Crimson Magic Clan (紅魔族の孤高の少女(ロンリーマスター), Kōmazoku no Ronrī Masutā); 3. Guardians (紅魔の里を守る者(ガーディアンズ), Gādianzu); 4. What Sleeps in Crimson Magic Village (紅魔の里に眠る存在(もの), Kōma no Sato ni Nemuru Mono); 5. Prelude to Explosion Madness (爆裂狂の誕生(プレリュード), Bakuretsukyō no Pureryūdo)
Set two years before the beginning of the main series, this novel follows Megumin and Yunyun's time as students in the Crimson Demon village's high school. As a child, Megumin is saved from a black beast by a big-breasted woman using Explosion magic, who inspires her to learn the spell. The beast is shrunken by the woman and becomes a small cat, which is later adopted by Megumin and nicknamed Chomusuke. In school, Megumin and Yunyun are repeatedly competing with one another to be the best student, with the former hoping to raise enough Skill Points to learn Explosion magic.
| 2 | YunYun's Turn; YunYun no Tān (ゆんゆんのターン) | December 1, 2014; 978-4-04-102438-6 | February 18, 2020; 978-1-97-538702-0 |
1. An Explosion NEET's Raison d'Etre (爆裂ニートの就職活動(レゾンデートル), Bakuretsu Nīto no Rezon Dētoru); 2. My Red-Haired Servant (赤髪の我が下僕(サーヴァント), Akagami no Sāvanto); 3. The Troublemaking Church in the City of Water (水の都の迷惑教団(トラブルメーカー), Mizu no To no Toraburumēkā); 4. Screwball Saviors of the City of Water (水の都の救世主達(きょうしんしゃたち), Mizu no To no Kyōshinsha-tachi); 5. The Destroyer from Crimson Magic Village (紅魔の里からの来訪者(デストロイヤー), Kōma no Sato kara no Desutoroiyā)
After graduating, Megumin attempts to raise money to visit Alcanretia and meet the woman who saved her as a child. With enough funding, she is able to travel to Alcanretia, but fails to find the woman, who is reportedly in the city of Axel. Along with Yunyun, she battles Anis, a demon seeking to retake Chomusuke for a woman named Wolbach.
| 3 | The Strongest Pair's Turn! Futari wa Saikyō! no Tān (ふたりは最強！のターン) | June 1, 2015; 978-4-04-103100-1 | July 21, 2020; 978-1-97-538704-4 |
1. Outlaws of the Starter Town (駆け出しの街の冒険者達(アウトロー), Kakedashi no Machi no Autorō); 2. The Famous Explosion Girl and the Forest-Demon Irregular (名物(ばくれつ)娘と森の悪魔(イレギュラー), Bakuretsu Musume to Iregyurā); 3. The God-Awful Priest and the Goddess of Water (荒ぶる聖女(アクシズ教徒)と水の女神(プリースト), Akushizu Kyōto to Purīsuto); 4. The Explosion Girl of Axel (アクセルの爆裂娘, Akuseru no Bakuretsu Musume)
In Axel, Megumin and Yunyun attempt to join parties, but Megumin's high-powered Explosion spell proves to be too overwhelming for her party members, while Yunyun's shyness scares off potential suitors. The two eventually partner together and fight Hoost, another demon hoping to take back Chomusuke. After parting ways, Megumin meets Kazuma and Aqua.

==== KonoSuba: An Explosion on this Wonderful World! Bonus Story ====
| No. | Title | Original release date | English release date |
|---|---|---|---|
| 1 | We Are the Megumin Bandits; Warera, Megumin Tōzokudan (我ら、めぐみん盗賊団) | December 28, 2016; 978-4-04-104991-4 | September 22, 2020; 978-1-97-538706-8 |
1. The New Elite Thief Gang (新鋭の盗賊団, Shinei no Tōzoku-dan); 2. The Thief Gang Grows (増殖する盗賊団, Zōshoku Suru Tōzoku-dan); 3. The Thief Gang Strays (迷走する盗賊団, Meisō Suru Tōzoku-dan); 4. The Thief Gang Raids (襲撃する盗賊団, Shūgeki Suru Tōzoku-dan); Final: The Thief Gang Strikes Back (逆襲する盗賊団, Gyakushū Suru Tōzoku-dan)
This novel is set between the ninth and tenth novels of the main series. Inspired by the acts of the Chivalrous Thief, Megumin forms a thieving party with Yunyun and Iris. Later, Kazuma's party visits the home of the Tennessee family, a rival of the Dustinesses and led by a woman named Carleen. Suspicious about the monsters surrounding the estate, Kazuma, Chris, and Megumin infiltrate and confront Carleen, hoping to steal her divine weapon used to summon said monsters.
| 2 | Deadbeat Busters; Wagamama Basutaazu (わがままバスターズ) | March 1, 2019; 978-4-04-107555-5 | August 24, 2021; 978-1-97-531953-3 |
1. Rain in the Capital! (王都に雨を！, Ōto ni Ame o!); 2. May Lightning Strike Arcanletia! (Part 1) (アルカンレティアに稲妻を！（前編）, Arukanretia ni Inazuma o! (Zenpen)); 3. May Lightning Strike Arcanletia! (Part 2) (アルカンレティアに稲妻を！（後編）, Arukanretia ni Inazuma o! (Kōhen)); 4. A Ray of Light in the Forest! (魔獣の森に斬光を！, Majū no Mori ni Zankō o!); Final: An Explosion for This Gem Beast! (宝石獣に爆焔を！, Hōsekijū ni Bakuen o!)

=== Manga ===
==== KonoSuba: An Explosion on this Wonderful World! ====
| No. | Original release date | Original ISBN | English release date | English ISBN |
|---|---|---|---|---|
| 1 | December 23, 2016 | 978-4-0406-8595-3 | June 25, 2019 | 978-1-97-535764-1 |
| 2 | January 23, 2017 | 978-4-0406-8818-3 | September 24, 2019 | 978-1-97-530597-0 |
| 3 | May 23, 2017 | 978-4-0406-9195-4 | December 24, 2019 | 978-1-97-530600-7 |
| 4 | September 23, 2017 | 978-4-0406-9437-5 | March 24, 2020 | 978-1-97-530603-8 |
| 5 | January 23, 2018 | 978-4-04-069628-7 | June 23, 2020 | 978-1-97-530606-9 |

==== KonoSuba: Even More Explosions on This Wonderful World! ====
| No. | Original release date | Original ISBN | English release date | English ISBN |
|---|---|---|---|---|
| 1 | August 23, 2018 | 978-4-0406-9986-8 | July 22, 2025 | 979-8-8554-1774-6 |
| 2 | February 23, 2019 | 978-4-0406-5490-4 | January 20, 2026 | 979-8-8554-1776-0 |
| 3 | September 20, 2019 | 978-4-0406-4022-8 | June 23, 2026 | 979-8-8554-1778-4 |
| 4 | July 20, 2020 | 978-4-0406-4741-8 | January 26, 2027 | 979-8-8554-1780-7 |

=== Anime ===
The series was revealed alongside the third season of the main series. Both series were produced by Drive and directed by Yujiro Abe, with chief direction by Takaomi Kanasaki. The rest of the main staff are returning from previous seasons. It aired from April 6 to June 22, 2023, on Tokyo MX and other networks. The opening theme is "Stay Free" by Machico, while the ending theme is "Jump In" by Megumin (Takahashi) and Yunyun (Aki Toyosaki). Crunchyroll streamed the series.

==== Episodes ====
| No. | Title (Note: English translated titles are taken from Crunchyroll.) | Directed by | Written by | Original release date | Ref. |
|---|---|---|---|---|---|
| 1 | "The Crimson-Eyed Wizards"; Transliteration: "Akai Hitomi no Wizāzu" (Japanese: 紅い瞳の魔法使い達(ウィザーズ)) | Ōri Yasukawa | Makoto Uezu | April 6, 2023 | |
Long before she meets Kazuma, a young Megumin accidentally unleashes a monster that attacks her, but she is saved by a mysterious and powerful mage who uses explosion magic to destroy the monster. Inspired, Megumin asks the mage to teach her how to cast explosion magic, but the mage refuses, cautioning her that explosion magic comes with many downsides. Megumin returns home, and is able to enroll in the Red Prison magic academy thanks to her parents making an important sale. At the academy, she meets Yunyun who declares that she will be Megumin's rival, and they soon form a grudging friendship with each other. Megumin then learns during her studies that explosion magic is not taken seriously by the Crimson Demon clan, as it is highly impractical and rarely cast. Regardless, Megumin decides to learn how to cast explosion magic, no matter what.
| 2 | "The Magic Academy's Taboo"; Transliteration: "Mahō Gakkō no Tabū" (Japanese: 魔法学校の禁忌(タブー)) | Akira Koremoto | Yasuko Aoki | April 13, 2023 | |
Upon returning home from school one day, Megumin discovers that her younger sister Komekko managed to capture a creature resembling a black cat. Fearing Komekko might try to eat the cat, Megumin adopts it and takes it to school with her, which immediately grabs the attention of her classmates. She is then able to convince the teacher that the cat is her familiar, and is allowed to bring it to class. Later, the teacher then informs the students that he will be taking them to an "augmentation surge", which involves the students killing forest creatures the teacher had frozen for them. The students are then attacked by a gargoyle and are saved by the unexpected assistance of Bukkorori, another Crimson Demon who has a crush on Soketto, the village's most attractive woman. Disgusted by Bukkorori's obsessive stalking of Soketta, the students leave him trapped in a pit and are horrified to see the village being attacked by a horde of gargoyles. The adults of the village band together and use their advanced magic to destroy the gargoyles, but Megumin is unimpressed since their spells pale in comparison to explosion magic. The gargoyles are defeated, but the adults accidentally destroy the village in the process and have to spend the whole night rebuilding it. The next day, since the cat still doesn't have a name, the other students start calling it "Megumin", much to Megumin's annoyance.
| 3 | "Guardians of the Crimson Demon Village"; Transliteration: "Kōma no Sato no Gādianzu" (Japanese: 紅魔の里の守護者達(ガーディアンズ)) | Takahiro Tanaka | Satoko Sekine | April 20, 2023 | |
Finally fed up with everybody calling the cat Megumin, Megumin follows Yunyun's suggestion and gives it the name "Ink". With the adults out to deal with a mysterious surge in monster activity, the students are left to do free study in the library. Bukkorori teleports into the library, having finally escaped from the pit trap and enlists Megumin and Yunyun's aid in helping him get closer to Soketto. Megumin comes up with the idea of her and Yunyun ambushing Soketto in the forest, with Bukkorori coming to her rescue. However, Bukkorori botches the plan when he is caught by Soketto. A large pack of One-Punch Bears then attacks, and Bukkorori uses an Inferno spell to destroy them, but accidentally hits Soketto with the spell as well. Soketto agrees to perform a fortune reading for Bukkorori, but when he asks who his future lover will be, the fortune reading turns up nothing. Heartbroken, Bukkorori flees, but Megumin and Yunyun do pick up that Soketto doesn't necessarily hate Bukkorori. Back at school, Megumin and Yunyun briefly talk about the possibility of Megumin finding a romantic partner before walking home together.
| 4 | "The Crimson-Eyed Lonely Master"; Transliteration: "Akai Hitomi no Ronrī Masutā" (Japanese: 紅い瞳の孤高の少女(ロンリーマスター)) | Yuki Watanabe | Touko Machida | April 27, 2023 | |
Megumin manages to be the top scorer in the latest round of tests, earning her a skill point potion. However, she notices Yunyun not acting like her normal self. Later, Yunyun confides in Megumin that one of their classmates, Funifura, has a younger brother who is ill and she has been asking to borrow money from Yunyun to buy medicine. Megumin realizes that Funifura is taking advantage of Yunyun's desperation for friendship to pressure her. Instead, Megumin crafts a healing potion and gives it to Funifura in return for Yunyun's money. Funifura then teases Megumin about how she seems to go out of her way to protect Yunyun even though she claims they aren't friends. Later, Yunyun reveals to Megumin that she's deliberately been holding back in her tests so that she and Megumin can graduate together, which angers Megumin. They then get into a physical brawl after Yunyun insults explosion magic, which Yunyun manages to win after pinning Megumin. Megumin tells Yunyun how she was inspired by the mage that saved her, and once she graduates she will go on a journey to track her down. Yunyun offers to be Megumin's traveling companion. However, a horde of monsters suddenly attacks the village, and Megumin rushes home to find Komekko missing.
| 5 | "Prelude to an Explosion of Madness"; Transliteration: "Bakuretsu-kyō no Pureryūdo" (Japanese: 爆裂狂の誕生(プレリュード)) | Shunji Yoshida | Makoto Uezu | May 4, 2023 | |
While Megumin was going to school, Komekko had befriended a demon named Host who has been working to break the seal imprisoning the Dark God Wolbach. It's during one of her visits that she found Ink and took her home. In the present, Megumin searches her house but doesn't find Komekko. Monsters then attack and kidnap Ink, only for Komekko to confront them to try and take Ink back. Megumin considers using her skill points to learn magic to fight the monsters, but hesitates as that would mean delaying her plans to learn explosion magic. Seeing Megumin's dilemma, Yunyun takes it upon herself to use her skill points to learn intermediate magic and fight the monsters, rescuing Ink. However, she uses up most of her energy in the process and collapses. At that moment the horde of monsters begins to head towards them, and Megumin realizes that Ink is actually the Dark God they are looking for. She also realizes she has gathered enough skill points to learn explosion magic, which she uses to destroy the entire monster horde. Afterwards, since they have both learned magic, Megumin and Yunyun graduate early. Megumin decides to officially make Ink her familiar and renames her Chomusuke.
| 6 | "The Raison D'être of an Explosive NEET"; Transliteration: "Bakuretsu Nīto no Rezondētoru" (Japanese: 爆裂ニートの就職活動(レゾンデートル)) | Yuki Kanazawa | Yasuko Aoki | May 11, 2023 | |
Having graduated from school, Megumin tries to earn enough money so she can leave the village to start adventuring, but she has trouble securing a stable job. In the meantime, she secretly trains in the night by casting explosion magic in the forest, with the village believing the explosions are the work of a demon. One night, Megumin is approached by a demon woman named Arnes who is looking for Chomusuke, whose true identity is the Dark God Wolbach. Megumin agrees to sell Chomusuke for 300,000 eris, but Chomusuke refuses to be taken away from Megumin. Yunyun then arrives and Arnes explains she has run into a bout of bad fortune, not knowing it is being caused by a bracelet she bought from Megumin's parents. The bracelet's energy attracts the attention of the villagers, who chase off Arnes thinking she is the cause of the explosions. Megumin decides to use the money she earned to leave the village and puts Chomusuke in Yunyun's care. After bidding farewell and receiving gifts from her classmates, Megumin uses a teleport spell to leave the village.
| 7 | "Troublemakers of the City of Water"; Transliteration: "Mizu no Miyako no Toraburumēkā" (Japanese: 水の都の迷惑教団(トラブルメーカー)) | Ōri Yasukawa | Touko Machida | May 18, 2023 | |
Megumin arrives in the city of Arcanretia but is warned that the monsters in the area are too powerful for an amateur adventurer like her, barring her from taking any quests. While wandering the city, Megumin sees a nun apparently being harassed by a pair of priests and intervenes, only to inadvertently be caught in a dispute between Axis and Eris worshippers. The nun, Cecily, calls the police as a distraction and leads Megumin away before trying to recruit her into the Axis Church. Seeing that Megumin is starving, Cecily takes Megumin to the Axis Church where she meets the archbishop Father Zesta. In return for Zesta providing food and board, as well as giving her a lead on a beautiful female mage who knows explosion magic living in the town of Axel, Megumin agrees to assist the Axis Church on their recruiting efforts. To her surprise, she encounters Yunyun and Chomusuke, who had both followed her to Arcanretia. Father Zesta is then arrested by the authorities on suspicion of tampering with the city's water springs, and Yunyun admits she delivered a prophecy from Soketta warning that Arcanretia would be in danger.
| 8 | "Fanatics of the Water City"; Transliteration: "Mizu no Miyako no Fanatikku" (Japanese: 水の都の狂信者達(ファナティック)) | Shigeki Awai | Makoto Uezu | May 25, 2023 | |
Father Zesta is arrested on suspicion of collaborating with the Devil King by pouring jelly slime powder into the city's hot springs. However, he manages to pass a lie detector test and the authorities have no choice but to release him. Megumin then wonders who the real culprit must be. Arnes then arrives to take Chomusuke, but Zesta, Cecily, and the rest of the Axis Church go into a religious frenzy when they realize she is a demon girl and chase her out of city, believing she is the culprit sabotaging the hot springs. Zesta then gifts Megumin with enough money to pay for a coach trip to Axel, and offers to have her stay the night. Cecily reveals to Megumin that Father Zesta had accidentally mixed jelly slime powder in the hot springs instead of baking powder, which was how he passed the lie detector test. Upon seeing how small the Axis Church's hot springs are, Megumin uses her explosion magic to create a much larger pool. The next day, Father Zesta casts a blessing on Megumin and she bids farewell to him and Cecily before leaving for Axel with Yunyun.
| 9 | "Destroyer from the Crimson Demon Village"; Transliteration: "Kōma no Sato kara no Desutoroiyā" (Japanese: 紅魔の里からの来訪者(デストロイヤー)) | Shunji Yoshida | Yasuko Aoki | June 1, 2023 | |
Megumin and Yunyun make the journey to Axel, but along the way, their caravan comes under attack numerous times by monsters. However, Megumin is stuck with the dilemma of whether or not to use explosion magic on regular monsters, necessitating Yunyun to fight them off on her own with her basic magic. Eventually, though, Yunyun becomes exhausted from using up all of her magical energy. At night, Yunyun expresses her desire to be in the same party as Megumin, but Megumin rejects the idea since the other adventurers believe Yunyun is the superior mage. The next day, Arnes attacks the caravan, revealing she sent the monsters to tire out Yunyun. She manages to take Chomusuke and begins powering up a spell to destroy Megumin and caravan after she realizes it was Megumin's father who sold her a cursed bracelet. She is interrupted by a pillar of divine light that suddenly appears over Axel, giving Chomusuke the opportunity to slip out of her grasp and Megumin takes the opportunity to kill Arnes with an explosion spell. With Megumin hailed as a hero, the caravan continues on towards Axel.
| 10 | "Outlaws of the Town for Beginners"; Transliteration: "Kakedashi no Machi no Autorō" (Japanese: 駆け出しの街の冒険者達(アウトロー)) | Yuki Watanabe | Satoko Sekine | June 8, 2023 | |
Megumin and Yunyun arrive in Axel shortly after Kazuma and Aqua do. Megumin makes her way to the Adventurer's Guild and flaunts her status as a highly ranked wizard from the Crimson Demon clan. However, despite Megumin receiving many offers from other parties, they quickly reject her when they realize she can only cast explosion magic, which is too situational. Meanwhile, Yunyun is too shy to be able to attract any attention from parties. During Megumin's attempts to find a party, she has numerous passing encounters with Kazuma, Aqua, and Darkness. She also learns the mage that matches her master's description works as a shopkeeper in the town, but she doesn't feel she is ready to see her until she becomes a proper adventurer. With several days passing with neither of them being able to secure any adventurer work and the both of them nearly broke, Megumin and Yunyun reluctantly agree to form a temporary party together to earn money.
| 11 | "The Explosion Girl and the Forest Irregularity"; Transliteration: "Bakuretsu Musume to Mori no Iregyurā" (Japanese: 名物(ばくれつ)娘と森の悪魔(イレギュラー)) | Shin'ya Kawabe | Touko Machida | June 15, 2023 | |
Host decides to head for Axel to search for Lady Wolbach. Meanwhile, Megumin and Yunyun are attempting to earn money and experience hunting low level monsters when they encounter Host and flee, warning the Adventurers' Guild of the demon's presence. The next day, the entire Guild bands together to hunt Host, but quickly withdraw when their most powerful members are defeated. Hearing of a blue haired arch priest that may be powerful enough to fight Host, the male adventurers begin combing the town looking for her. Megumin returns to the inn to find Cecily waiting for her, explaining she was sent to Axel after Zesta had a vision of Aqua appearing there. Megumin reluctantly agrees to help Cecily in return for a large bounty, but have little luck. Megumin and Yunyun then join a party looking to trap Host, but are ambushed by the demon. He detects Chomusuke's scent on them and offers a deal: if they hand over Chomusuke to him, he will leave them and Axel alone. Megumin and Yunyun retreat back to Axel, wondering how they can defeat Host.
| 12 | "An Explosion on This Wonderful World!"; Transliteration: "Kono Subarashii Sekai ni Ekusupurōjon o!" (Japanese: この素晴らしい世界に爆焔(エクスプロージョン)を！) | Ōri Yasukawa | Makoto Uezu | June 22, 2023 | |
Not intending to hand Chomusuke over, Megumin comes up with a plan to use a stuffed cat toy to lure Host into a trap so she can use her explosion magic on him. During the night though, Yunyun sneaks into Megumin's room and steals the cat toy. Believing Megumin is still asleep, Yunyun admits that she's grown to respect Megumin and her choice to learn explosion magic, but she knows that Megumin's plan won't work. Instead, she has recruited a party to help fight Host, and she casts a sleep spell on Megumin to prevent her from interfering. Megumin wakes up the next day and chases after Yunyun, receiving a blessing from Cecily on the way. Meanwhile, Host neutralizes most of Yunyun's party, but she is able to cast a paralyze spell on Host but accidentally paralyzes herself as well. Megumin then arrives and casts her explosion on Host, destroying him. Afterwards, Cecily leaves on a journey to gain enough levels so she can eventually take over Axel's local church. Yunyun, realizing she won't be able to improve herself by relying Megumin, also leaves on her own journey to learn advanced magic and briefly crosses paths with Megumin's master. Despite Megumin defeating Host, adventurer parties still avoid her. With little other choice, Megumin answers a party recruitment ad and meets Kazuma and Aqua for the first time.
