= KonoSuba season 2 =

2017 Japanese anime television series

KonoSuba: God's Blessing on This Wonderful World!
- Season 2
- Promotional poster
- No. of episodes: 10

Release
- Original network: Tokyo MX
- Original release: January 12 – March 16, 2017

Season chronology
- ← Previous; Season 1 Next → Season 3

The second season of the anime television series KonoSuba: God's Blessing on This Wonderful World!, marketed as KonoSuba: God's Blessing on This Wonderful World! 2, adapts the third and fourth light novel volumes written by Natsume Akatsuki and illustrated by Kurone Mishima. The season ran in Japan on Tokyo MX and other networks from January 11 to March 16, 2017, and streamed on Crunchyroll internationally outside Asia.

The opening theme song is "Tomorrow" performed by Machico, while the ending theme song is "Ouchi ni Kaeritai" (おうちに帰りたい; lit. 'Wanna Go Home') performed by Sora Amamiya, Rie Takahashi and Ai Kayano.

== Episodes ==
No. overall	No. in season	Title (Note: English translated titles are taken from Crunchyroll)	Directed by	Written by	Storyboarded by	Original release date	Ref.
11	1	"Give Me Deliverance From This Judicial Injustice!"; Transliteration: "Kono Futō na Saiban ni Kyūen o!" (Japanese: この不当な裁判に救援を！)	Yasuo Iwamoto	Makoto Uezu	Takaomi Kanasaki	January 12, 2017	
Finding no support from his allies, Kazuma is arrested for treason due to accidentally blowing up a noble's mansion. As Aqua makes various failed attempts to break him loose, Kazuma is interrogated by the prosecutor, Sena, using a magic lie detector. Due to his connections with Wiz, Kazuma is accused of having connections with the Devil King and is put on trial, where all of his perverted crimes are brought to light. Although Kazuma proves that he is not part of the Devil King's army, Alderp, the noble to whom the mansion belonged, sways the judge towards a guilty verdict. Just then, Darkness reveals her heritage to the Dustiness family and convinces the judge to give Kazuma a stay of trial. Now tasked with proving his innocence and repaying the damages to the mansion, Kazuma quickly finds all of his possessions repossessed to go towards his debt, which currently stands at 1,240,000,000 Eris.
12	2	"A Friend for This Crimson Demon Girl!"; Transliteration: "Kono Kōma no Musume ni Yūjin o!" (Japanese: この紅魔の娘に友人を！)	Yasuyuki Ebara	Makoto Uezu	Takaomi Kanasaki	January 19, 2017	
As Kazuma notices that Darkness hasn't come back since negotiating with Alderp, Megumin brings in a cat that she names Chomusuke. When Sena tasks the group to stop a group of toads only to quickly find themselves outnumbered, they are saved by Megumin's self-proclaimed rival, Yunyun. After an uneventful duel resulting in Megumin's victory, Kazuma and Megumin somehow end up sharing a bath together, leading to some panic when Aqua returns home. The next day at Wiz's shop, Megumin and Yunyun have another duel to decide who can properly use a magical Friendship Crystal, which ends up showing everyone their past embarrassments.
13	3	"Peace for the Master of This Labyrinth!"; Transliteration: "Kono Meikyū no Aruji ni Yasuragi o!" (Japanese: この迷宮の主に安らぎを！)	Shunji Yoshida	Makoto Uezu	Takaomi Kanasaki	January 26, 2017	
Wanting to earn some real money, Kazuma and Aqua explore a newly discovered pathway in Keele's Dungeon, coming across gremlins, mimics, and the undead along the way. They soon come across the dungeon's master, an arch wizard named Keele, who had been seeking a priest to put him to rest and reunite him with his late wife. After sending off Keele and receiving his treasure, Kazuma realizes that it is Aqua's holy aura that keeps attracting the undead.
14	4	"A Betrothed for This Noble Daughter!"; Transliteration: "Kono Kizoku no Reijō ni Ryōen o!" (Japanese: この貴族の令嬢に良縁を！)	Tarō Kubo	Kōjirō Nakamura	Takaomi Kanasaki	February 2, 2017	
Darkness suddenly returns, asking for the others' help in getting out of an arranged marriage with the Alderp's son, Walther. Secretly eager to get Darkness out of his party, Kazuma suggests that she attend the marriage meeting under the pretense of ruining it while secretly trying to prevent her from doing so in order to earn a reward from her father. As Darkness tries to turn off Walther with her shameless behavior, she ends up having a one-on-one duel against Kazuma, whose perverted mannerisms help him win. Afterward, the arranged marriage is called off before Sena once again approaches Kazuma.
15	5	"Servitude for This Masked Knight!"; Transliteration: "Kono Kamen no Kishi ni Reizoku o!" (Japanese: この仮面の騎士に隷属を！)	Shunji Yoshida	Touko Machida	Takaomi Kanasaki	February 9, 2017	
As a result of a magic circle that Aqua had drawn in Keele's dungeon, strange explosive doll monsters have started to appear, putting the town at risk. Investigating the dungeon once more, Kazuma and Darkness discover the archmagician behind the dolls to be one of the Devil King's commanders, Vanir, who has the ability to read minds. Although he appears to be defeated following a lucky attack, Vanir attaches his mask onto Darkness and possesses her body, only to be completely put off by her masochism. After Kazuma cleans up the magic circle and places a seal on Vanir's mask, Vanir attempts to use Darkness' body to take vengeance on Aqua. When removing the seal fails to do anything, Kazuma has Megumin cast Explosion to destroy Vanir. Afterward, Darkness is faced with the embarrassment of everyone calling her Lalatina, while Kazuma has his debt cleared and is given a hefty reward for defeating Vanir.
16	6	"Goodbye to This Irritating Living World!"; Transliteration: "Kono Wazurawashī Gaikai ni Sayonara o!" (Japanese: この煩わしい外界にさよならを！)	Yasuyuki Ebara	Kōjirō Nakamura	Yasuyuki Ebara	February 16, 2017	
Kazuma is surprised to discover that Vanir had an extra life and has since quit his position as a commander to work at Wiz's shop, striking up a business partnership to sell products from Kazuma's world. One of these is a kotatsu, which Kazuma refuses to come out from under, and harasses Darkness and Megumin when they try to get him out. Even when he finally needs to use the bathroom, he still refuses to come out and asks Darkness and Megumin to carry it to the bathroom with him in it. Fed up with his behavior, the two girls throw him and the kotatsu out the window instead. Later, after making a somewhat regretful sword purchase, Kazuma and his party go on a quest to eliminate a group of Lizard Runners. However, due to various factors, Kazuma's plan ends in failure, and he once again dies and finds himself in Eris' underworld. While waiting to be revived, Kazuma starts to perceive Eris as his ideal heroine and contemplates just being reborn into the real world until Megumin takes drastic measures to convince him to return to his body.
17	7	"An Invitation for This Knucklehead!"; Transliteration: "Kono Futebuteshī Namakura ni Shōtai o!" (Japanese: このふてぶてしい鈍(なまくら)に招待を！)	Takatoshi Suzuki & Shunji Yoshida	Touko Machida	Rebun Koiwai	February 23, 2017	
Vanir gives Kazuma the choice of either selling the intellectual rights for his real-world products for a one-off payment of 300 million eris or maintaining a profit-sharing contract of 1 million eris a month. Not wanting this new sense of wealth to distract him from adventuring, Megumin proposes that everyone go to the Arcanretia hot springs to heal Kazuma's previous injuries. Joined by Wiz, the group set off via wagon alongside a baby red dragon, only for Darkness' "hardness" to wind up attracting a stampede of Running Kite Hawks.
18	8	"Sightseeing in This Pitiful City!"; Transliteration: "Kono Itaitashī Machi de Kankō o!" (Japanese: この痛々しい街で観光を！)	Yasuo Iwamoto	Kōjirō Nakamura	Takaomi Kanasaki	March 2, 2017	
Kazuma and the others manage to lure the kite hawks into a cave and deal with them all at once, only to cause more trouble for the other travelers later when Aqua attracts some zombies. The party finally arrives at Arcanretia, which turns out to be the hometown of the Axis Church that Aqua founded. While taking in some sightseeing, Kazuma and Darkness are constantly pestered by the fanatic Axis-worshipping residents, who keep trying to convert them to their church while looking down on Darkness for worshipping Eris.
19	9	"A Goddess for This Corrupt Hot Springs Town!"; Transliteration: "Kono Fujō na Onsengai ni Megami o!" (Japanese: この不浄な温泉街に女神を！)	Atsushi Nakayama	Makoto Uezu	Takaomi Kanasaki	March 9, 2017	
After witnessing Aqua warp the town's citizens with her petty confessional hearings, Kazuma takes a dip in the mixed bath, where he comes across another man who is as sick of the town's behavior as he is. Meanwhile, Aqua, contrary to how she is worshipped as a goddess, finds herself under scrutiny from the citizens after she keeps purifying the hot springs into regular water. Although Aqua reveals her identity as a goddess, the citizens don't believe her; instead, they declare her to be part of the Devil King's army and launch a witch hunt.
20	10	"God's Blessing on This Wonderful Party!"; Transliteration: "Kono Subarashii Nakama-tachi ni Shukufuku o!" (Japanese: この素晴らしい仲間たちに祝福を！)	Shunji Yoshida	Makoto Uezu	Takaomi Kanasaki & Tetsuhito Saito	March 16, 2017	
Evading the angry mob, the gang discovers that the source of the town's water is being poisoned by the man from earlier, who is revealed to be one of the Devil King's army leaders, Hans the Deadly Poison Slime. Learning that Hans had eaten the hot springs' overseer, violating the non-interference agreement she had made with the Devil King's army upon leaving, Wiz steps in to face Hans while Aqua attempts to purify the source, receiving help from the cultists after they realize the truth. Noticing that bodies that haven't been fully digested can still be resurrected, Kazuma lets himself be eaten by Hans so that Megumin and Wiz can bring him down to size before Aqua, with support from her followers, delivers the finishing blow. After everything is resolved, the gang ends up getting kicked out of town due to Aqua's attack purifying all of its hot spring water and return home to Axel.
OVA–2	OVA–1	"God's Blessings on These Wonderful Works of Art!"; Transliteration: "Kono Subarashii Geijutsu ni Shukufuku wo!" (Japanese: この素晴らしい芸術に祝福を！)	Shunji Yoshida (Note: Production staff information is taken from the ending credits of the OVA)	Touko Machida	Takaomi Kanasaki	July 24, 2017	
Kazuma meets a novice adventurer called Ran, who claims to be Kazuma's fan. A quest is proposed to Kazuma and his party in front of Ran, so Kazuma accepts the quest to look good in front of his fan; after some convincing, they all go to fight a robot golem. Despite being told to destroy it, Megumin desires to keep it. Aqua says she'll make Megumin a transforming robot if she destroys the golem robot, to which she agrees. Megumin sees the robot wasn't completely destroyed and still wants it, so Aqua says she'll still build the transforming robot made out of milk cartons, yet Kazuma tries to tell them it's still active, which falls on deaf ears, then it self-detonates. Kazuma returns to the guild and boasts to Ran about the success of his quest. Another quest, yet again, is proposed to Kazuma in front of Ran. Kazuma accepts it and convinces his party to do it as well. The quest is that Kazuma and his party have to investigate the ruins they already been too. Kazuma and his party search the ruins for items. Among many haunted dolls, they find a diary filled with the life of a previous Japanese NEET who was reincarnated into this world. The writer was a man who could create anything he wanted, and then it goes on how he eventually gave up when he thought why should he fight the devil king. The diary goes on about how he created the golem. The diary also states that he created bishoujo robots, but none of them were perfect. It then states the writer decided to leave and become a merchant in a wealthy city, then Kazuma realized they met him before. After Aqua finishes reading, Kazuma gets desperate to find this robot. When Kazuma finds the robot, Aqua clicks a button and activates it. The robot asks who its master is and Kazuma bravely steps forward claiming that the robot's master is him. The robot pulls out a whip and starts abusing and barking commands at Kazuma, who is cowering with his party, since the creator is a masochist. Megumin then uses explosion and destroys the ruins. Kazuma tells Ran what happened, who is uninterested. Ran soon leaves Kazuma and appears to be quarreling with Luna. Kazuma approaches them, to help sort out the quarrel. Turns out Ran isn't actually Kazuma's fan. Ran was put on a quest to motivate Kazuma and his party to do more quests. After hearing this, Kazuma gets angry and walks closer to Ran and Luna. Ran and Luna realize that Kazuma is coming closer and get scared; they start praising Kazuma at a minimum. Kazuma is unmoved by their false praises and uses his steal-skill to steal their panties.
