= KonoSuba season 1 =

2016 Japanese anime television series

KonoSuba: God's Blessing on This Wonderful World!
- Season 1
- Promotional poster
- No. of episodes: 10

Release
- Original network: Tokyo MX
- Original release: January 14 – March 17, 2016

Season chronology
- Next → Season 2

KonoSuba: God's Blessing on This Wonderful World! is an anime television series based on the light novels of the same title written by Natsume Akatsuki and illustrated by Kurone Mishima. The first season adapts the first two volumes and ran in Japan on Tokyo MX and other networks from January 14 to March 17, 2016. The season streamed on Crunchyroll and AnimeLab internationally outside Asia.

The opening theme song is "Fantastic Dreamer" performed by Machico, while the ending theme song is "Chīsana Bōken-sha" (ちいさな冒険者, lit. 'Little Adventurer') performed by Sora Amamiya, Rie Takahashi, and Ai Kayano.

== Episodes ==
No. overall	No. in season	Title (Note: English translated titles are taken from Crunchyroll)	Directed by	Written by	Storyboarded by	Original release date	Ref.
1	1	"This Self-Proclaimed Goddess and Reincarnation in Another World!"; Transliteration: "Kono Jishō Megami to Isekai Tensei o!" (Japanese: この自称女神と異世界転生を！)	Shunji Yoshida	Makoto Uezu	Takaomi Kanasaki	January 14, 2016	
While out buying a game, a sleep-deprived shut-in named Kazuma Satō mistakes a tractor for a speeding truck and rushes in to push a girl out of the way, dying from shock as a result. In the afterlife, Kazuma is greeted by a goddess named Aqua, who offers to transport him to an RPG-like world in order to battle against a Devil King instead of going to heaven or reincarnation. Given the option to choose any item or ability to arm himself with, Kazuma, annoyed by Aqua's attitude, decides to drag her along with him to the town of Axel. With Aqua unable to return until the Devil King is defeated, the two earn some money to register as adventurers, with Kazuma assigned to a rather generic Adventurer class while Aqua is assigned as an Archpriest. The two then spend the following weeks working carefree lives as laborers before eventually remembering that they need to do some actual adventuring.
2	2	"An Explosion for This Chunibyo!"; Transliteration: "Kono Chūnibyō ni Bakuen o!" (Japanese: この中二病に爆焔を！)	Masato Miyoshi	Aoi Akashiro	Takaomi Kanasaki	January 21, 2016	
After struggling to defeat some giant frogs, Kazuma and Aqua seek out members to join their party. After a long wait with no respondents to their advertisement for advanced class adventurers only, they are approached by Megumin, a magician capable of performing powerful explosion magic. However, she becomes incapacitated immediately after casting an Explosion spell and is too stubborn to learn anything else. Kazuma reluctantly keeps Megumin in his party so she wouldn't make him seem like a perverted freak in public. Kazuma is then approached by a crusader named Darkness, who also seems to have a dubious quirk.
3	3	"A Panty Treasure in This Right Hand!"; Transliteration: "Kono Migite ni Pantsu o!" (Japanese: この右手にお宝(ぱんつ)を！)	Hidehiko Kadota	Kōjirō Nakamura	Tetsuhito Saito	January 28, 2016	
Darkness reveals she hardly ever hits anything with her attacks and is strictly a meat shield, so Kazuma rejects her, but Darkness persists in following him. Her thief friend Chris teaches him a Steal skill, which he inadvertently uses to steal girls' panties. Chris humiliates him by recounting his panty theft in a crowded tavern. Kazuma tries to get everyone but Aqua to leave the party by warning them of their quest to defeat the Devil King, but this only succeeds in exciting Darkness's masochistic urges. The entire town is brought together to defeat an army of cabbage monsters for the harvest, where the party performs admirably, to Kazuma's frustration: Darkness shields the villagers from enemy attacks while also showing off her exhibitionist tendencies, Megumin blows up the entire cabbage horde with a single spell, and Aqua uses water magic to boost morale and preserve the freshness of the harvested cabbages.
4	4	"Explosion Magic for This Formidable Enemy!"; Transliteration: "Kono Kyōteki ni Bakuretsu Mahō o!" (Japanese: この強敵に爆裂魔法を！)	Bob Shirohata	Makoto Uezu	Takayuki Inagaki	February 4, 2016	
With hunting requests declining due to one of the Devil King's generals moving in nearby, Kazuma accompanies Megumin as she practices her explosion magic on a seemingly abandoned castle. This infuriates the general, Verdia the Dullahan, who had been living in that castle. Placing a death curse upon Darkness, Verdia demands that Megumin come to his castle within a week in order to save Darkness' life. However, after Verdia takes his leave, Aqua removes the curse from Darkness, eliminating the need to journey to the castle.
5	5	"A Price for This Cursed Sword!"; Transliteration: "Kono Maken ni Onedan o!" (Japanese: この魔剣にお値段を！)	Takatoshi Suzuki	Aoi Akashiro	Takaomi Kanasaki	February 11, 2016	
Wanting to earn some money despite only hard quests being available, Aqua takes on a request to purify a lake filled with alligator monsters, with the others putting her in a cage to keep her safe. Though Aqua gets the quest done, she is left traumatized from hours of alligator attacks. On their return, the group encounters Kyouya Mitsurugi, another human Aqua sent to Axel, who is displeased with how Aqua is treated. However, Aqua refuses to leave Kazuma's party, and the rest of the party refuses to let Kyouya join them. Kyouya challenges Kazuma to a duel to determine whether Aqua will join Kyouya's party or stay with Kazuma's. However, he is quickly defeated after Kazuma steals the cursed sword he received when he came to the RPG world. Kyouya tries to repurchase the sword the next day, but Kazuma has sold it. Verdia returns to the town, wondering why no one came to fight him.
6	6	"A Conclusion to This Worthless Fight!"; Transliteration: "Kono Rokudemonai Tatakai ni Ketchaku o!" (Japanese: このろくでもない戦いに決着を！)	Shunji Yoshida	Makoto Uezu	Tetsuhito Saito	February 18, 2016	
Annoyed that Megumin is still using his castle for explosion practice, Verdia, after proving easily susceptible to Aqua's purification magic, summons an undead army, which is defeated by Megumin's explosion magic. As Verdia then battles against Darkness, Kazuma deduces that he is weak against water and has Aqua attack him with a flood. With Verdia weakened, Kazuma steals Verdia's head, allowing Aqua to defeat him with the spell Turn Undead. The next day, Kazuma and his party earn a hefty reward for defeating Verdia, which is put towards paying off the damages Aqua's flood caused to the town.
7	7	"A Second Death in This Freezing Season!"; Transliteration: "Kono Kogoesō na Kisetsu ni Nidome no Shi o!" (Japanese: この凍えそうな季節に二度目の死を！)	Masato Miyoshi	Aoi Akashiro	Masahiro Ise	February 25, 2016	
Needing money to pay off his debts and survive the freezing weather, Kazuma and his party take on a quest to kill Snow Sprites. However, their hunt attracts the attention of a powerful Winter Shogun, who kills Kazuma, sending him to the world's afterlife, where he meets the goddess Eris. Eris offers to reincarnate him into a wealthy family in Japan, but Kazuma finds he misses his companions from the RPG world. Aqua calls for Kazuma to return to his body, having already cast magic to bring him back to life. Kazuma willingly returns but refuses to thank Aqua for resurrecting him, declares Eris the main heroine of his story, and is disenchanted at his companions with their odd personalities.
8	8	"A Loving Hand for Our Party When We Can't Make It Through Winter!"; Transliteration: "Kono Fuyu o Kosenai Ore-tachi ni Ai no Te o!" (Japanese: この冬を越せない俺達に愛の手を！)	Hidehiko Kadota	Kōjirō Nakamura	Takaomi Kanasaki	March 3, 2016	
Kazuma and Aqua visit a magic shop run by a kind-hearted lich named Wiz, who reveals herself to be one of the Devil King's generals in charge of protecting a barrier surrounding the Devil King's castle. After Wiz teaches Kazuma the Drain Touch skill, the party takes on a request to exorcise evil spirits from a mansion where they can stay during the winter. That night, Kazuma and Megumin find themselves on the run from an army of possessed dolls while also desperately needing the bathroom. Aqua saves the day again with her Turn Undead spells. The following morning, Aqua reveals that her actions after first meeting Wiz led to the mansion being haunted in the first place.
9	9	"God's Blessing on This Wonderful Shop!"; Transliteration: "Kono Subarashii Mise ni Shukufuku o!" (Japanese: この素晴らしい店に祝福を！)	Tarō Kubo	Aoi Akashiro	Takayuki Inagaki	March 10, 2016	
Kazuma and his adventure friends Keith and Dust go to a shop run by succubi, who provide male adventurers with erotic dreams. After having a luxurious crab meal and falling asleep in the bath, Kazuma mistakes Darkness entering the bath as the dream and orders her to wash his back. The belief that he is dreaming makes Kazuma more domineering than usual, so the submission-loving Darkness gives in to his demand. Before they can proceed further, Aqua announces that she has trapped a succubus, who says she was sent to incite Kazuma's dream, leading Kazuma to get beaten up by the others while helping the succubus escape. The next day, a mobile fortress known as the Destroyer approaches town.
10	10	"Final Flame for This Over-the-top Fortress!"; Transliteration: "Kono Rifujin na Yōsai ni Shūen o!" (Japanese: この理不尽な要塞に終焔を！)	Shunji Yoshida	Makoto Uezu	Tetsuhito Saito	March 17, 2016	
Darkness tells Kazuma that her true name is Dustiness Ford Lalatina, the daughter of a well-regarded family. Using Aqua's barrier-breaking spells and Megumin and Wiz's explosion magic, the party takes down the Destroyer, which sets off a self-destruct sequence. Heading inside to find a way to stop the Destroyer from exploding, Kazuma finds the power source and has Wiz teleport it elsewhere. Megumin uses explosion to destroy the fortress. As peace returns to the town, Kazuma finds himself under arrest as the power source he teleported away destroyed a noble's mansion.
OVA–1	OVA–1	"God's Blessings on This Wonderful Choker!"; Transliteration: "Kono Subarashii Chōkā ni Shukufuku o!" (Japanese: この素晴らしいチョーカーに祝福を！)	Yasuo Iwamoto (Note: Production staff information is taken from the ending credits of the OVA)	Aoi Akashiro	Takaomi Kanasaki	June 24, 2016	
While running into Yunyun at Wiz's shop, Kazuma ends up putting on a choker that supposedly grants wishes. He quickly discovers, however, that this choker will gradually tighten and eventually strangle him to death in four days unless he can fulfill the wish he had subsconsciously made while putting it on. The girls admit they were partly responsible for it so they offer to help. Taking advantage of the pity he receives from the other girls as a result, Kazuma guilts them into following all kinds of ridiculous and perverted commands as they try to grant his unknown wish. While most girls fulfill his perverted desires, he makes Aqua run errands and do menial tasks. During the third night, Yunyun asks why Megumin wishes to save Kazuma, and claims its just because he carries her when she's unconscious and because they're friends, which is a half truth since the main reason is because he is the first person to never kick her out of his party since she can't handle her magic. Yunyun states no matter what thing Kazuma makes her do, she'll help get the collar off since she's partly responsible. At the beginning of the fourth day, Kazuma finds himself at peace after letting out all his callous feelings towards the girls; he told Megumin he tried to feel her small breasts whenever he had to carry her after using explosion, Yunyun and Wiz he looks at their chests when he talks to them, Darkness that he started thinking of her as just breasts since she moved into the mansion, and Aqua no matter how hard he tried, he couldn't get turned on by her, upsetting her that he never thought of her like he does the others. It turns out the wish he had made was that he could know what it's like to be comforted, which occurred before his confessions, resulting in the choker becoming undone without them knowing. Angered by the humiliation they were subjected to when the wish wasn't anything perverted, the girls quickly take their revenge on Kazuma, who once again finds himself in an awkward meeting with Eris.
