= KonoSuba season 3 =

2024 Japanese anime television series

KonoSuba: God's Blessing on This Wonderful World!
- Season 3
- Promotional poster
- No. of episodes: 11

Release
- Original network: Tokyo MX
- Original release: April 10 – June 19, 2024

Season chronology
- ← Previous; Season 2

The third season of the anime television series KonoSuba: God's Blessing on This Wonderful World!, marketed as KonoSuba: God's Blessing on This Wonderful World! 3, adapts the sixth and seventh light novel volumes written by Natsume Akatsuki and illustrated by Kurone Mishima. The season ran in Japan on Tokyo MX and other networks from April 10 to June 19, 2024, and streamed on Crunchyroll internationally outside Asia.

The opening theme song is "Growing Up" performed by Machico, while the ending theme song is "Ano Hi no Mama no Bokura" (あの日のままのぼくら; lit. 'Us, Just Like on That Day') performed by Sora Amamiya, Rie Takahashi and Ai Kayano.

== Episodes ==
No. overall	No. in season	Title (Note: English translated titles are taken from Crunchyroll)	Directed by	Written by	Storyboarded by	Original release date	Ref.
Season 3
21	1	"God's Blessings on This Bright Future!"; Transliteration: "Kono Akarui Mirai ni Shukuhai o!" (Japanese: この明るい未来に祝杯を！)	Ōri Yasukawa	Takaomi Kanasaki	Takaomi Kanasaki	April 10, 2024	
After Kazuma and his party return to Axel, he is still traumatized by his experiences battling the Demon General Sylvia. (Note: As depicted in the film KonoSuba: God's Blessing on This Wonderful World! Legend of Crimson.) Frustrated at his poor luck in romance, Kazuma decides to change his class to monk and join a religious order. As Kazuma travels to a nearby shrine, Aqua, Megumin, and Darkness follow him to try and convince him to change his mind. On the way, they encounter a wounded girl, which Kazuma warns is a monster called a Tranquility Girl in disguise that presents a facade of innocence to lure her prey. Despite Kazuma's warnings, none of the party can bring themselves to kill the Tranquility Girl and spare her life. Kazuma later decides to double back to instruct the Tranquility Girl not to attack the local monks, only to catch her showing her true personality. He then recovers a magic mallet from one of the Tranquility Girl's victims, which can create gold coins out of nowhere, and decides to return to Axel, only for Chris to steal it from him. Later that night, Hagen delivers a message from the kingdom's first princess, Iris, inviting Kazuma and the party to a royal dinner.
22	2	"A Smile for This Dour Girl!"; Transliteration: "Kono Warawanai Shōjo ni Hohoemi o!" (Japanese: この笑わない少女に微笑みを！)	Shinya Kawabe	Makoto Uezu	Takaomi Kanasaki	April 17, 2024	
After selling a batch of lighters from Wiz's shop, Kazuma and his party head off to meet Iris. Despite a rough start, the dinner proceeds smoothly until Iris asks Kazuma to tell a story of how he defeated Kyouya. Kazuma, not wanting to reveal that he resorted to trickery by using his Steal skill, tells an embellished tale. However, when he is forced to admit that he is just the Adventurer class, the weakest of all classes, Iris begins to doubt Kazuma's story. Darkness then steps forward to defend Kazuma's integrity, insisting he is her trusted comrade. Claire, Iris' bodyguard, then challenges Kazuma to a duel to test his skills. However, the duel quickly ends when Kazuma uses his Steal skill and accidentally steals Claire's underwear instead of her sword. Despite this, Iris only becomes more fascinated with Kazuma, and he promises to tell her more stories about his adventures. As Iris and her retinue are about to teleport back to the Royal Capital, she pulls in Kazuma with her.
23	3	"A Re-education for This Bright Little Girl!"; Transliteration: "Kono Sakashī Shōjo ni Saikyōiku o!" (Japanese: この賢しい少女に再教育を！)	Yasuo Iwamoto	Takaomi Kanasaki	Takaomi Kanasaki	April 24, 2024	
Kazuma is welcomed as a guest at the royal palace due to Iris very rarely acting on her desires. Initially wary, Kazuma quickly builds a connection with Iris, who considers him like an older brother. He decides to stay at the palace a little longer, acting as her playmate and learning about her lonely and isolated life inside the castle due to her royal status, as well as constant attacks by the Demon King's army. One week later, Darkness, Aqua, and Megumin arrive at the palace to bring Kazuma back to Axel, but Iris requests to hold a going away feast for him first. During the feast, Kazuma overhears the nobles discussing marrying Darkness off to the first prince, Jatice. He then meets privately with Iris, who admits she likes him because he treats her as an equal instead of a princess like everybody else. Upon hearing about a mysterious thief targeting nobles with bad reputations in the capital, Kazuma volunteers to catch the thief to stay in the castle with Iris. However, his plan backfires when Claire sends him to stay in Alderp's mansion, the next most likely target for the thief.
24	4	"Divine Punishment for This Handsome Gentleman Thief!"; Transliteration: "Kono Ikemen Gizoku ni Tenchū o!" (Japanese: このイケメン義賊に天誅を！)	Ōri Yasukawa	Makoto Uezu	Yujiro Abe	May 1, 2024	
Kazuma and his party spend one week at Alderp's mansion looking out for the thief. Kazuma, Aqua, and Megumin take advantage of Alderp's hospitality, angering him enough to order them to leave. The night before they set to leave, Kazuma, while getting a late-night snack, encounters Chris, who is the thief. Kazuma refuses to hear her reasons for stealing from the nobles and lets her escape while letting her hit him with a Bind spell to allay suspicion. However, Kazuma's party took advantage of the situation to get payback. After leaving Alderp's mansion, Kazuma is forced to report his failure to catch the thief to Iris, who reluctantly dismisses him from the castle. That night, Chris meets Kazuma again, explaining she is looking for powerful items called the Divine Treasures, the special tools given to each of the reincarnated Japanese people. She asks for his help to steal one from the palace, but Kazuma refuses. The Demon King's army then attacks the capital again, and Kazuma joins the defense to impress Iris.
25	5	"Nefarious Friends for This Sheltered Princess!"; Transliteration: "Kono Hakoiri Ōjo ni Akuyū o!" (Japanese: この箱入り王女に悪友を！)	Shunji Yoshida	Takaomi Kanasaki	Takaomi Kanasaki	May 8, 2024	
Kazuma and his party join the forces defending the capital, and while his party performs well, Kazuma himself gets ambushed and killed by kobolds. While Kazuma is in the afterlife, Eris instructs him to retrieve the Divine Treasures, which he has no choice but to accept. After being revived, Kazuma takes Megumin back to the castle to recover, where they meet with Iris. Megumin senses that the necklace Iris is wearing contains magical power, and she reveals it is a magical relic entrusted to her, but nobody knows what it does. Kazuma recognizes the Japanese inscription on the writing and accidentally activates it, switching bodies with Iris. He then realizes the necklace is one of the Divine Treasures Eris told him about. While Iris takes the opportunity to leave the castle unnoticed with Megumin, Kazuma stays behind to pose as Iris until the spell wears off. Kazuma takes advantage of his position to get in the bath with Darkness and Claire, only to suddenly swap back into his own body to get pummelled by a group of thugs Iris picked a fight with.
26	6	"A Farewell to This Lavish Lifestyle!"; Transliteration: "Kono Suteki na Kurashi ni Sayonara o!" (Japanese: この素敵な暮らしにさよならを！)	Shinsuke Gomi	Makoto Uezu	Yang Lie-Chun	May 15, 2024	
Word of the body-swapping incident spreads through the capital, turning Kazuma into a social pariah. That night, Chris approaches him and asks for his help in stealing the necklace due to a dark secret it possesses: the body switch becomes permanent if one of the switched bodies dies, meaning one can achieve eternal life by endlessly switching bodies with a younger person and then murdering them. Hearing of this, Kazuma finally agrees to help Chris. Although they are forced to fight their way through Iris' guards, Kyouya, and Kazuma's own party after sneaking into the castle, they successfully steal the necklace and escape. However, Kazuma accidentally steals Iris' ring as well. Darkness quickly figures out that Kazuma and Chris are responsible and warns Kazuma never to let anybody know he has the ring, as Iris was only supposed to give it to the person she intends to marry. Iris bids Kazuma and his party farewell. Later, it is revealed that Iris knew Kazuma was the thief all along and eagerly awaits the day he defeats the Demon King so she can marry him. Meanwhile, Alderp tortures someone to learn more information, as a Divine Treasure he had was stolen.
27	7	"Rest for This Up-And-Coming Adventurer!"; Transliteration: "Kono Nariagari Bōken-sha ni mo Ansoku o!" (Japanese: この成り上がり冒険者にも安息を！)	Akira Yamada	Takaomi Kanasaki	Takaomi Kanasaki	May 22, 2024	
Kazuma and his party return to Axel as heroes. Kazuma himself receives a massive windfall as he is awarded the bounty for defeating Sylvia and the return on his investments in Vanir's business. In the meantime, Aqua is convinced to buy an egg that she believes is a dragon egg, which she affectionately names "Emperor Zel", though Kazuma believes she was scammed into buying a regular chicken egg. While at Wiz's shop, Vanir offers to read Darkness' fortune and warns her that the shadow of destruction looms over her family and nothing she can do will save them. Darkness then leaves to visit her sickly father, while Vanir also warns Kazuma not to go idle on his newly gained wealth. Darkness later returns to the mansion and convinces Kazuma to help her collect the bounty on a Kowloon Hydra. The party uses Aqua to purify the lake the hydra resides in to draw it out, only for her to get stranded on top of one of its heads when it surfaces. With Megumin unable to cast Explosion without risking hurting Aqua, the party is forced to battle the hydra head-on. Elsewhere, Alderp gazes at a painting of Darkness.
28	8	"Rest for the Master of This Lake!"; Transliteration: "Kono Mizūmi no Omo ni Eien no Nemuri o!" (Japanese: この湖の主に永遠の眠りを！)	Shunji Yoshida	Makoto Uezu	Takayuki Inagaki	May 29, 2024	
Kazuma and his party fail to defeat the hydra, with Kazuma's body being swallowed and digested, but Darkness is able to recover it so Aqua can revive him. The party retreats back to Axel for R&R, and Kazuma suspects Darkness has ulterior motives for hunting the hydra. When they return to the guild, they learn that the capital will not send knights to hunt the hydra because they are busy hunting down the thieves responsible for stealing the Divine Treasures from the royal palace. In addition, a bounty for the thieves has been posted in Axel due to the Crimson Demon fortune teller suggesting the thieves are hiding in the town. As Kazuma hides out in his mansion, he grows concerned at Darkness' obsession with defeating the hydra. When she leaves to try and fight it on her own, Kazuma rallies the Axel adventurers to assist her. As the adventurers tie down the Hydra, Kazuma is able to drain its mana while Darkness protects him from getting crushed by its body. Once the hydra's mana is drained, Megumin destroys it with Explosion magic. The adventurers celebrate the destruction of the hydra, but when Kazuma, Aqua, and Megumin return to the mansion, they find a letter from Darkness informing them that she is leaving the party.
29	9	"A Talking-To for This Runaway!"; Transliteration: "Kono Iede Musume ni Sekkyō o!" (Japanese: この家出娘に説教を！)	Ōri Yasukawa	Takaomi Kanasaki	Takaomi Kanasaki	June 5, 2024	
Kazuma and his party attempt to confront Darkness about her leaving the party, but she refuses to allow them to enter her mansion. Kazuma then tries to recruit a new tank for their party, but Megumin deliberately sabotages his attempts. Dust then approaches Kazuma and asks for help keeping an eye on his party mate Rin, who he fears is being seduced by a suspicious noble. Dust confronts the noble, but Rin reveals to Kazuma that the noble is actually interested in Dust and she was trying to protect him. As both Rin and Kazuma leave Dust to his fate, Rin mentions there are rumors that Darkness will be marrying Alderp. That night, Kazuma sneaks into Darkness' mansion and confronts her, and she admits she must marry Alderp to pay off a debt her family owes to him. However, Darkness refuses to call off the wedding and tries to chase Kazuma out of the mansion. Kazuma flees and finds himself in Darkness' father's room. Darkness' father asks Kazuma to take Darkness and flee as far away as possible, but Kazuma makes his escape instead, not wanting to elope with Darkness. Kazuma then returns to his mansion, defeated.
30	10	"Blessings for This Selfish Bride!"; Transliteration: "Kono Migattena Hanayome ni Shukufuku o!" (Japanese: この身勝手な花嫁に祝福を！)	Yasuo Iwamoto	Makoto Uezu	Takayuki Inagaki	June 12, 2024	
Alderp quickly announces the date of his wedding with Darkness. Despite pleas from both Megumin and Aqua, Kazuma refuses to get involved unless Darkness asks for his help directly, and he is left cleaning up after the messes Megumin and Aqua leave in their own plots to try and stop the wedding. Megumin later confronts him about his inaction, and he admits that he does not know how they can get away with defying a powerful noble like Alderp. Vanir then arrives and reveals to Kazuma that the Dustiness family fell into debt with Alderp due to taking out a loan from him to repair the damage caused by the Destroyer and Kazuma's party's attempts to stop it, with the stipulation that if the debt cannot be paid, Darkness must trade her body as collateral. Enraged, Kazuma enters into a deal with Vanir to save Darkness. At the wedding, Darkness fondly recalls her time with Kazuma and the party but resigns herself to her fate, certain that Kazuma won't come to save her. However, as the wedding begins, Kazuma and Aqua crash the wedding disguised as clergy, and Kazuma declares he will "kidnap" Darkness to protect her from Alderp.
31	11	"God's Blessings for These Unchanging Days!"; Transliteration: "Kono Kawaranai Nichijō ni Shukufuku o!" (Japanese: この変わらない日常に祝福を！)	Shinya Kawabe	Takaomi Kanasaki	Takaomi Kanasaki & Tetsuhito Saito	June 19, 2024	
Alderp points out that Darkness owes him 2 billion Eris, which Kazuma manages to pay off thanks to selling all his merchandise ideas to Vanir. He then lectures Darkness to stop putting herself down and that she essentially belongs to him now and will have to work as the party's tank to pay him back. However, Alderp orders his guards to restrain Kazuma and Darkness anyways until Megumin and Yunyun arrive. Megumin threatens to cast Explosion in the middle of town to protect Darkness, which scares Alderp's men into standing down. Alderp then tries to bribe the adventurers into capturing Darkness, but they instead start a brawl with Alderp's troops to cover for her escape. The party returns to Darkness' mansion, where they find her father barely clinging to life. He is glad to see the wedding was called off and gives Kazuma his blessings. However, Aqua notices that a curse is causing his illness and dispels it, restoring him to full health. Meanwhile, Vanir confronts Alderp, revealing he arranged for Kazuma to crash the wedding as part of his plan to rescue his friend, a fellow demon Maxwell, who Alderp had enslaved using a Divine Treasure and forced him to curse Darkness' father. Vanir frees Maxwell from his contract, and Maxwell subsequently captures Alderp to feed on his despair to complete his end of the contract. Later, it is revealed that Alderp has disappeared, and evidence of his many crimes has come to light, including gifting the body-swapping Divine Treasure to Iris. With Alderp disgraced, Kazuma and his party no longer have to fear becoming fugitives, and Kazuma will likely have his 2 billion Eris refunded. Darkness apologizes to the party for leaving them and causing so much trouble, but they gladly accept her back into the party. Later, Kazuma jokes about how Darkness is now legally considered a divorcee, calling her "Divorcedness".
Bonus Stage
OVA–3	OVA–1	"Red Stream Explosion!"; Transliteration: "Reddo Sutorīmu Ekusupuroōjon!" (Japanese: レッドストリーム・エクスプロージョン！)	Manganji Chika	Takaomi Kanasaki	Takaomi Kanasaki	March 14, 2025 (theatrical); April 25, 2025 (BD/DVD)	
In this story, our favorite group of adventurers is tasked with dealing with a storm caused by the Great Spirit of Storms every year. Conflicts arise among the team members, but they decide to accept the job. All the town's adventurers join the event – in bathing suits... Upon arrival, they witness the spirit taking the form of a woman and Aqua attemptis to pacify her using her divine words – unsuccessfully. The storm intensifies, and several adventurers, including Kazuma, plunge into the lake to fight the spirit. Kazuma convinces Aqua to call the spirit an old bar hag, and together, they manage to pull the spirit near the shore, permitting Megumin, Wiz and Yunyun to cast their combat spells. The adventurers then witness the spirit revert to a pacified state. Following this, Kazuma and the other men eagerly await the spirit's reward, which turns out to be a gust that strips the female adventurers, but said event is thwarted by Aqua. The story ends with Kazuma and all other men requesting the town's succubus' services, causing a hefty queue while waiting for the spirit's annual return next year. Meanwhile all the other female adventurers are left puzzled, wondering why the men are absent from the victory party.
OVA–4	OVA–2	"Beware of Fakes!"; Transliteration: "Nisemono Chūi!" (Japanese: 偽者注意！)	Shunji Yoshida	Takaomi Kanasaki	Takaomi Kanasaki	March 14, 2025 (theatrical); April 25, 2025 (BD/DVD)	
Our favorite adventurers group clashes with a similar party, composed of Ozuma Zatou, a veteran adventurer, and three girls: Megumi (a mage), Acure (a priestess), and Rakless (a crusader). This new group claims that the other party are impostors, trying to tarnish their reputation. When Kazuma meets them, he claims to be "Tanaka" and presents them with tear-jerking stories about how "Kazuma" had to overcome an unreasonable debt and other injustices to become a wealthy developer of goods. This leaves the contented party thinking that "Kazuma" might not be a bad guy after all. The next day, Ozuma's party bangs on Kazuma's mansion door, demanding to see "Tanaka" after finding out he is "Kazuma" after all. Kazuma admits it, but claims he didn't lie; all his stories were true. After some altercations with Aqua, Megumin, and Darkness, they challenge Ozuma's party to make a name for themselves in Axel first, so they can prove who the real impostor is. After a few weeks, the two groups meet at the Guild, where Ozuma's party is praised for their multiple kills of one-shot-bears. However, it seems that these killings resulted in a disruption of the local ecology, allowing powerful white wolves to expand their territory, leading to dangerous encounters with the local population. Both parties leave together to handle the white wolves, and Kazuma's party successfully does so, gaining the respect of Ozuma's party. At the end, Ozuma's group departs and promises to rectify all those bad rumors they heard about Kazuma and his companions – which, in fact, are all very true.
