= Drive (studio) =

Japanese animation and music studio

Drive Co., Ltd.
- Native name: 株式会社ドライブ
- Type: Kabushiki gaisha
- Industry: Animation, Music
- Founded: May 11, 2015; 11 years ago
- Headquarters: 1-6-8 Igusa, Suginami, Tokyo, Japan
- Key people: Chie Nakamura (CEO)
- Website: www.drive-music.jp

Drive Co., Ltd. (Japanese: 株式会社ドライブ) is a Japanese animation and music studio based in Suginami, Tokyo.

== Works ==
=== TV series ===
Title	Director(s)	First run start	First run end	Eps	Note(s)	Ref(s)
Actors: Songs Connection	Osamu Yamasaki	October 6, 2019	December 22, 2019	12	Part of the multimedia franchise by Exit Tunes.	
Teppen!!!!!!!!!!!!!!! Laughing 'til You Cry	Shinji Takamatsu (chief); Toshinori Watanabe	July 2, 2022	September 24, 2022	12	Based on a manga by Inujun.	
To Your Eternity Season 2	Kiyoko Sayama	October 23, 2022	March 12, 2023	20	The second season of To Your Eternity.	
KonoSuba: An Explosion on This Wonderful World!	Takaomi Kanasaki (chief); Yujiro Abe	April 6, 2023	June 22, 2023	12	Spin-off to KonoSuba: God's Blessing on This Wonderful World!.	
The Demon Prince of Momochi House	Bob Shirahata	January 5, 2024	March 23, 2024	12	Based on a manga by Aya Shouoto.	
KonoSuba God's Blessing on This Wonderful World! Season 3	Takaomi Kanasaki (chief); Yujiro Abe	April 10, 2024	June 19, 2024	11	The third season of KonoSuba: God's Blessing on This Wonderful World!.	
Tying the Knot with an Amagami Sister	Yujiro Abe	October 2, 2024	March 26, 2025	24	Based on a manga by Marcey Naito.	
To Your Eternity Season 3	Kiyoko Sayama (chief); Sōta Yokote	October 4, 2025	March 28, 2026	22	The third season of To Your Eternity. Co-production with Studio Massket.	
Go for It, Nakamura!	Aoi Umeki	April 2, 2026	June 24, 2026	13	Based on a manga by Syundei.	
Inherit the Winds	Tomohiro Kawamura	January 2027	TBD	TBD	Original work. Co-production with Live2D Creative Studio.	
Happy Kanako's Killer Life	Shinji Takamatsu	April 2027	TBD	TBD	Based on a manga by Toshiya Wakabayashi.	

=== Original net animations ===
Title	Director(s)	First run start	First run end	Eps	Note(s)	Ref(s)
Vlad Love	Mamoru Oshii; Junji Nishimura	February 14, 2021	March 14, 2021	12	Original work.	
