= Kemono Michi =

Japanese manga series

- First tankōbon volume cover, featuring Shigure (left) and Hiroyuki (right)

けものみち (Kemonomichi)
- Genre: Fantasy comedy; Isekai
- Manga
- Written by: Natsume Akatsuki
- Illustrated by: Mattakumo-suke; Yumeuta
- Published by: Kadokawa Shoten
- Magazine: Monthly Shōnen Ace
- Original run: November 26, 2016 – August 26, 2024
- Volumes: 14
- Anime television series

Kemono Michi: Rise Up
- Directed by: Kazuya Miura
- Written by: Touko Machida
- Music by: Shunsuke Takizawa
- Studio: ENGI
- Licensed by: Crunchyroll (Note: In North America through Crunchyroll, LLC (formerly known as Funimation).)
- Original network: AT-X, Tokyo MX, TVA, KBS, SUN, BS11
- Original run: October 2, 2019 – December 18, 2019
- Episodes: 12
- icon

Kemono Michi (Japanese: けものみち; "Animal Trail") is a Japanese manga series written by Natsume Akatsuki and illustrated by Mattakumo-suke and Yumeuta. It was serialized in Kadokawa Shoten's shōnen manga magazine Monthly Shōnen Ace from November 2016 to August 2024. It has been collected in fourteen tankōbon volumes. An anime television series adaptation titled Kemono Michi: Rise Up produced by ENGI aired from October to December 2019.

== Plot ==
Genzō Shibata is a famous professional wrestler known in the world of wrestling as Animal Mask. On the night of the match for the title of World Champion, he is suddenly teleported into a fantasy world by a princess, who asks him to act as a beast killer and free the kingdom from the beasts inhabiting the land. However, Genzō, an animal lover, immediately refuses the order by knocking out the princess with a German suplex. Alone in a new world, Genzō soon sides with the wolf-girl Shigure, joining alongside her to the local guild and starting a new career as a beast hunter. However, instead of killing them, his goal is to befriend and capture as many monsters as possible, in order to realize his greatest dream: becoming the owner of a pet shop.

== Characters ==
=== Main characters ===
Genzō Shibata (柴田 源蔵, Shibata Genzō) / Animal Mask (ケモナーマスク, Kemonā Masuku)
Voiced by: Katsuyuki Konishi (Japanese); Tyson Rinehart (English)
A famous pro wrestler teleported into a fantasy world to slay the Demon King and become the Hero. However, due to his deep love for animals, he refuses the idea of killing monsters, preferring instead to capture them alive to become the owner of a pet shop. His strong empathy with animals allows him to befriend almost every monster he meets in the blink of an eye, but when provoked, he proves to be an exceptional fighter. Unfortunately, despite his efforts, his successes in making monsters docile and friendly have made him earn the title of "Beast Killer" among the other hunters, much to his rage.
Hiroyuki (ひろゆき)
Voiced by: Rie Suegara (Japanese); Samantha Herek (English)
Genzō's pet dog that was transported with him to the new world. He is frequently targeted for kidnap by Edgar, a criminal friend of Misha and Wolfgang, mostly to get revenge on Genzō but also because as the only known member of his species in the new world he is considered rare and valuable. As Genzō once put it, if he were to sell both Hiroyuki and Carmilla he would get far more for the dog than for her.
Shigure (シグレ)
Voiced by: Akira Sekine (Japanese); Emily Hornsby (English)
A half human, half wolf beastman and one of Genzō's partners, Shigure is an extremely greedy and ambitious wolf girl who dreams of becoming rich. However, her terrible sense for affairs made her lose a large amount of gold she had received on loan from a group of loan sharks, forcing her to sign a contract as a slave to repay her debt. After having been saved by Genzō, she joins him in his quest to become a famous beast hunter, in order to collect enough money to realize her dream. Her most well-known gag is that when Genzō attacks the knight hero Heat Haze for attempting to annihilate the beasts with his swords, she steals the latter's swords and sells them, pretending to claim someone has "dropped" a sword "out of nowhere".
Hanako (花子)
Voiced by: Yuki Yagi (Japanese); Apphia Yu (English)
Hanako, real name Lindabrea Fafnir Gildmerag (ファフニール・ギルドメラグ・リンダブレア, Fafunīru Girudomeragu Rindaburea), is a half human, half dragon and the sole heir of a noble family who left her castle to know the world. While she appears to look like a child with dragon horns and a tail, she is quite strong and resistant, while her endless hunger pushes her to consume any living thing she sees. She joins Genzō to fulfill her dream to taste the meat of every single monster in the world.
Carmilla Vanstein (ヴァンシュタイン・カーミラ, Vanshutain Kāmira)
Voiced by: Arisa Sakuraba (Japanese); Mallorie Rodak (English)
Hanako's trustworthy vampire maid. When Hanako joins Genzō, Carmilla followed along, despite her distaste for Genzō. Like most vampires, she fears holy water and garlic, and requires an umbrella when in sunlight. While appearing arrogant and spiteful towards Genzō, she tries to appease Hanako's every whim, which comes across as borderline obsessive. She is wasteful with any money they make and uses it strictly on alcohol for her own consumption.
Jeeg (ジーク, Jiku)
A mysterious giant ant that works for Genzō. His motivations are unknown.

=== Other characters ===
Macadamian Ogre (マカデミアンオーガ, Makademian Ōga)
Voiced by: Tetsu Inada (Japanese); Daman Mills (English)
Genzō's initial wrestling opponent for the title of World Champion, whose ring name is MAO. Their match was interrupted when Genzō was teleported into the other world by the princess, and has since searched endlessly for him so they can finish their bout. When the dark forces in the new world call for their own "hero", MAO is then teleported by the vampire princess Joanna, joining her people in the war against humans, and becoming the new Demon King.
Joanna (イオアナ, Ioana)
Voiced by: Sora Amamiya (Japanese); Lindsay Seidel (English)
The heir princess of all vampires, whose people are fighting an endless war against humans and other species. Once she heard that the princess called Genzō in to their world to fight against them, she performs the same ritual to call the wrestler MAO, Genzō's wrestling nemesis, into their world, making him the vampires' champion.
Rose (ローゼ, Rōze)
Voiced by: Kana Aoi (Japanese); Kristi Rothrock (English)
Joanna's servant, she is the highest class of vampire. When Joanna says to Hanako that she could provide an even stronger vampire servant for her, Rose duels Carmilla to prove her point. After Rose wins easily, Hanako beats up both Joanna and Rose and says she is content with her current servant, faults and all.
Misha (ミーシャ, Mīsha)
Voiced by: Hana Tamegai (Japanese); Leah Clark (English)
A half human, half cat beastman, she is approached by Genzō when he first arrived to the new world. His love for animals caused both her and her brother Wolfgang a lot of stress when he pet them and stroked their fur against their wills. Since then, she sees Genzō only as a pervert and is out for revenge in order to take him down.
Wolfgang von Kraftman (ヴォルフガング・フォン・クラフトマン, Vorufugangu fon Kurafutoman)
Voiced by: Kenichirou Matsuda (Japanese); Gabe Kunda (English)
A wolf man and Misha's brother. While initially appearing gruff and brutal, he becomes fearful of the outdoors after his first encounter with Genzō as he fears to run into him again. Due to this, he is usually against Misha's plans for revenge against Genzō. Whenever Genzo catches him, he treats Wolfgang like a pet dog and rubs his tummy (a canine's sweet spot); this reduces him to becoming like a domesticated pet, something he secretly loves yet finds humiliating.
Edgar (エドガー, Edogā)
Voiced by: Taketora (Japanese); Cris George (English)
A town merchant and companion of Misha and Wolfgang. Like Misha, he knows Genzō as only a pervert and helps her with her ideas of revenge.
Orc King (オークキング, Ōku Kingu)
Voiced by: Daisuke Ono (Japanese); Brad Kurtz (English)
The leader of an ogre village whose inhabitants use threatening and attacking humans. Once Genzō received the quest to put an end to the problem by the guild, he reaches the village and challenges the orc king into a wrestling match. After being defeated, the orc considers Genzō to be an honorable and trustworthy fighter, and agrees to keep his men far from human settlements from now on.
Altena Edgardo Ratis (エドガルド・ラティス・アルテナ, Edogarudo Ratisu Arutena)
Voiced by: Rie Suegara (Japanese); Amber Lee Connors (English)
The princess who summoned Genzō to the world. Immediately upon his arrival, she asks him to defeat the Demon King and the foul beasts that roam the land, only for him to suplex her, revealing her underwear to the world. Now, she is known as "Princess Buttocks" by everyone in the kingdom and still attempts to convince Genzō to slay the Demon King. Later, after being humiliated in one of her wrestling matches, she becomes a masochist.
Celes (セリス, Serisu)
Voiced by: Aoi Koga (Japanese); Amanda Lee (English)
A half human, half lizard beastman, she approaches Genzō to become his apprentice. After initially turning down her request, he eventually agrees after he realizes she is part lizard and that her belly and midsection are scaly.
Kobold wife (コボルトの奥さん, Koboruto no Okusan)
Voiced by: Junko Minagawa
A local bear-like beastman, she is dismissive of Genzō until he compliments her on her looks and fur, making her swoon and fall for him, even though she is married. She is seen frequently around town on the lookout for Genzō behind the back of her husband.
Kobold husband (コボルトの旦那さん, Koboruto no Dannasan)
Voiced by: Hiroki Yasumoto
A local bear-like beastman, he is approached by Genzō to compete in the town wrestling match. While initially antagonistic of Genzō because of his wife's interactions, he agrees to participate after challenging and losing a duel with Genzō, gaining respect for him in the process.

== Media ==
=== Manga ===
Written by Natsume Akatsuki and illustrated by Mattakumo-suke and Yumeuta, Kemono Michi was serialized in Kadokawa Shoten's Monthly Shōnen Ace magazine from November 26, 2016, to August 26, 2024. Kadokawa collected its chapters in fourteen tankōbon volumes, released from April 25, 2017, to October 25, 2024.

==== Volumes ====
No.	Release date	ISBN
1	April 25, 2017	978-4-04-105543-4
2	October 26, 2017	978-4-04-105549-6
3	July 24, 2018	978-4-04-107051-2
4	January 26, 2019	978-4-04-107904-1
5	September 25, 2019	978-4-04-108231-7
6	November 26, 2019	978-4-04-108853-1
7	June 26, 2020	978-4-04-109634-5
8	February 26, 2021	978-4-04-110933-5
9	September 25, 2021	978-4-04-111836-8
10	May 26, 2022	978-4-04-112477-2
11	December 26, 2022	978-4-04-113267-8
12	November 25, 2023	978-4-04-113916-5
13	July 25, 2024	978-4-04-114945-4
14	October 25, 2024	978-4-04-115308-6

=== Anime ===
An anime adaptation was announced by Monthly Shōnen Ace on January 18, 2019. It was later announced that the adaptation would be a television series titled Kemono Michi: Rise Up (旗揚！けものみち, Hataage! Kemonomichi; translation: "Launching Business! Animal Trail"), with animation by ENGI. The series was directed by Kazuya Miura, with Touko Machida handling the series composition, and Tomoka Noumi designing the characters. It aired from October 2 to December 18, 2019, on AT-X, Tokyo MX, TVA, KBS, SUN, and BS11. It was also streamed on AbemaTV. NoB and Katsuyuki Konishi performed the series' opening theme song "Fight! Kemona Mask" (闘魂(ファイト)！ケモナーマスク), while Momosumomosu performed the series' ending theme song "Anecdote" (アネクドット).

Funimation licensed the series for a SimulDub. Following Sony's acquisition of Crunchyroll, the series was moved to Crunchyroll.

==== Episodes ====
No.	Title (Note: All English titles are taken from Funimation.)	Original release date
1	"Wrestler × Summoning"; Transliteration: "Resurā × Shōkan" (Japanese: レスラー × 召喚)	October 2, 2019
During his match against rival Macadamian Ogre, professional wrestler Genzō Shibata is suddenly summoned to a fantasy world by Princess Altena Elgard Ratis, who asks him to become a Hero and help defeat the Demon Lord by killing evil beasts infesting the kingdom. Genzō, an animal lover, refuses by performing a German suplex on the Princess, knocking her out. In the city, criminal beastman siblings Misha and Wolfgang plan to capture and sell Genzō as a slave. However, Genzō overpowers Wolfgang so he can nuzzle his fur. Edgar, another criminal, plans to enslave a wolf-girl named Shigure, so Genzō rescues her. Elsewhere, Edgar plans to steal Genzō's dog, Hiroyuki, to get revenge. Shigure takes Genzō to the Hunters Guild to earn money through job requests. The guild master, assuming Genzō to be a perverted lunatic, sends him to kill dangerous Cerberuses, but Genzō instead overpowers and tames the pack, earning the nickname Beast Killer. Genzō decides that rather than kill evil beasts he will capture and sell them as pets. The money obsessed Shigure decides to join him in running his pet shop, along with a giant ant beast Genzō seemingly befriended without explanation.
2	"Quest × Demon Beast Killer"; Transliteration: "Kuesuto × Majūgoroshi" (Japanese: クエスト × 魔獣殺し)	October 9, 2019
Genzō and Shigure need money to buy a shop, plus Shigure still owes Edgar money. Genzō hears another hunter call him Beast Killer and punches him through a wall as he hates the nickname. Genzō decides to catch a salamander and is asked by Heat Haze, the guild's strongest warrior, to join his team; however, Genzō knocks him out after learning they plan on killing the salamander. Genzō easily adds the salamander to his beast collection and collects the reward. Shigure pays her debt to Edgar while Wolfgang remains terrified of Genzō. Elsewhere, the noble half human/half dragon girl, Lindabrea Fafnir Gildmerag, grows bored with beast meat and runs away to try other foods. Genzō continues to increase his beast collection, making acquiring a shop more urgent, and accepts a lucrative job to deal with orcs stealing crops. Lindabrea's vampire maid, Carmilla Vanstein, learns Lindabrea is missing. Genzō travels to the orcs' stronghold and challenges their king. After an evenly matched fight, Genzō ultimately wins, earning the king's respect. Using his reward money, Genzō purchases a shop but fails to secure the bank loan needed to start running it as a business. Meanwhile, Lindabrea appears in town.
3	"Runaway Girl × Attacker"; Transliteration: "Iedeshōjo × Shūgekisha" (Japanese: 家出少女 × 襲撃者)	October 16, 2019
Genzō starts preparing to open his pet shop, but finds that without the bank loan, feeding the pets is impossibly expensive. Genzō finds Lindabrea in his garden and is forced to feed her to stop her trying from eating Hiroyuki. Genzō hears a rumor a dragon has been attacking people and decides to capture it. Genzō dons his wrestling gear and sets a trap, which accidentally catches Lindabrea. He is spotted by hunters who assume he is a masked pervert. They are confronted by Carmilla, who also assumes Genzō is a perverted kidnapper. Genzō's wrestler strength proves superior and he overpowers Carmilla before fleeing. At the shop, Lindabrea explains her family are one of four noble families who directly serve the Demon King. Carmilla appears again but does not recognize Genzō without his mask. Following Shigure's advice Genzō, neutralizes Carmilla with holy water and garlic while Lindabrea explains her food based reason for running away. After she asks to stay, Genzō hires her to work in the shop and nicknames her Hanako. When Genzō discovers the dragon attacking people was actually Carmilla sucking their blood, he German suplexes her.
4	"Demon Beast × Part-Time Job"; Transliteration: "Majū × Baito" (Japanese: 魔獣 × バイト)	October 23, 2019
Princess Altena is furious that her guards and priests call her Princess Buttocks behind her back. Meanwhile, Shigure despairs as all the shop's money is being spent on Hanako's food, Carmilla's alcohol and pet food. They are visited by a bank representative who informs them their loan will be denied unless they can provide the down payment. Genzō forces everyone to earn money any way they can. After Shigure asks the guild master for help, Genzō is sent to hunt a griffin and once again knocks out Heat Haze for planning to kill it. Genzō learns griffin parents force their babies to fight, only raising the strongest to adulthood and abandoning the weakest to die. As such, he steals the weakest one to become its new parent but is quickly knocked out and only survives because Hanako managed to carry him home. Carmilla, who was killed and eaten by one of the adults, is buried in Genzō's garden to resurrect. The baby griffin rapidly grows to its adult size, increasing their pet food bill, though Shigure is less concerned than normal since she recently earned a small fortune by selling all of Heat Haze's "lost" swords.
5	"Animal Mask × MAO"; Transliteration: "Kemonā Masuku × MAO" (Japanese: ケモナーマスク × MAO)	October 30, 2019
Macadamian Ogre, known professionally as MAO, had spent his wrestling career always losing to Genzō only for Genzō to disappear during the championship match. MAO eventually becomes depressed and refuses to wrestle anyone except Genzō. Meanwhile, Shigure forces Genzō to take on a new job so Misha and Wolfgang take advantage of his absence to finally steal Hiroyuki. Edgar later finds Misha and Wolfgang beaten up as their theft was foiled by Genzō's ant beast friend, leaving Wolfgang with phobias of both Genzō and ants. Genzō loses interest in the hunt after discovering their targets are plant based mandrakes, and the hunt fails completely when Genzō is distracted fighting with Carmilla and Hanako eats all the mandrakes. Genzō learns about Hiroyuki almost being stolen and punishes Wolfgang, impressing nearby citizens. Their applause makes Genzō nostalgic about his previous matches against MAO. MAO is unable to get past his Genzō obsession but is suddenly summoned to the same fantasy world by Joanna, the princess of the vampires, who received permission from the Demon King to summon another Demon King from the alternate world to defeat the hero summoned by Princess Altena. As such, he introduces himself to Joanna.
6	"Loser × Master"; Transliteration: "Ponkotsu × Goshujin-sama" (Japanese: ポンコツ × ご主人様)	November 6, 2019
Based on his use of his wrestling name, MAO, Joanna and her court mistakenly confirm he is an actual Demon King from an alternate world. MAO is ecstatic to discover the hero they want him to defeat is Genzō. Joanna reveals that her desire is to defeat Hanako, with whom she has a longstanding childhood rivalry. Joanna wanted to replace Carmilla with a vampire maid under her control, thus gaining an advantage over Hanako, so she had her higher vampire maid, Rose, defeat and humiliate Carmilla to prove Carmilla was unworthy of serving Hanako. After Hanako admitted defeat on Carmilla's behalf, she then avenged Carmilla by defeating both Joanna and Rose, humiliating them both and foiling Joanna's plot. After hearing how Hanako ran away, Joanna is convinced Hanako wants to find and defeat the Hero to gain glory and so she summoned MAO to defeat the Hero first. Meanwhile, Hanako happily reminisces about how useless Carmilla is while watching Genzō burying Carmilla in the garden to resurrect after being killed and eaten by yet another beast. Unbeknownst to Genzō, a blue haired girl is secretly watching him.
7	"First Student × Pain in the Butt"; Transliteration: "Hatsu Deshi × Mendokusai Hito" (Japanese: 初弟子 × めんどくさい人)	November 13, 2019
The blue haired girl, a hunter named Celes, approaches Genzō and is instantly punished for calling him Beast Killer. Celes explains she is an inexperienced hunter and the guild master suggested she ask Genzō for training. Genzō agrees after realizing Celes is a lizardman. They begin training, though Genzō's enthusiasm goes up and down based on how much of her scaly body he can see. Shigure, Carmilla, and Hanako also try to help. Celes reveals she wanted training specifically from Genzō because hunters at the guild were making fun of her for being a lizardman. Genzō furiously beats up the hunters, while Celes is inspired by her teachers to become a better person. The hunters realize they were wrong and apologize and Genzō helps them all get over it by insisting Celes duels one of the hunters, which Celes wins. The hunters explain they were frustrated because a new beast appeared. Shigure and the others realize this was actually Genzō in his wrestling gear. Clause, the bank representative, approaches Genzō with plans to hold a fighting tournament, which would earn Genzō a lot of money for his shop. Genzō agrees after realizing he misses wrestling.
8	"Animal × Event"; Transliteration: "Kemonā × Kōgyō" (Japanese: ケモナー × 興行)	November 20, 2019
Genzō tries to include beasts in the matches, but Clause suggests beast men instead. Genzō sees the kobold he always flirts with and decides to ask her husband to participate. The husband, believing Genzō wants to steal his wife, fights him, and though he loses he recalls his youth as a warrior. The kobold wife is confused that Genzō appears to have stolen her husband. Genzō then tries to ask Wolfgang, but he is still traumatized so Misha decides to participate instead. Genzō also recruits orcs and hunters, though he knocks out Heat Haze for trying to use weapons. A hooded figure watches the tournament from a distance. Meanwhile, Princess Altena learns about the tournament and recognizes Genzō on the flyer. As the matches begin, they are hugely popular. Genzō and Carmilla form a tag team against Misha and Heat Haze. The hooded figure is revealed to be Wolfgang and he is coerced into replacing Heat Haze. As the crowd grows rowdier, Shigure admits the drama of Wolfgang and Genzō's rivalry is good entertainment. Genzō ultimately declares the tournament a success. Shigure is later furious after all the tournament profits have been wasted.
9	"Princess × Panties"; Transliteration: "Purinsesu × Pantsu" (Japanese: プリンセス × パンツ)	November 27, 2019
After soldiers locate Genzō, Princess Altena tries to retrieve him but he German suplexes her, exposing her panties to the public. Meanwhile, Joanna informs MAO of Genzō's overexaggerated achievements before he defeats beast bandits. When Genzō refuses to fight the Demon King, Altena orders her knights to kill him, but he defeats them then punishes her. Elsewhere, Joanna gives MAO control of her beast man army. Altena tries multiple times to convince Genzō to be the hero but is punished each time. He then goes to the guild for information and Heat Haze tries to join them but is once again knocked out. The other hunters mistakenly believe Genzō plans to kill the Demon King and start calling him Hero. Hanako worries that if Genzō is the hero it will cause problems since her family serves the Demon King. Altena arrives to inform Genzō that another Demon King has been summoned, but he punishes her anyway. Later, MAO goes to the orcs' stronghold and starts beating them up to learn where Genzō is. Afterwards, the orcs show Genzō a drawing of MAO, explaining he is the new Demon King, and Genzō recognizes him instantly.
10	"Money × Bonds"; Transliteration: "Kane × Kizuna" (Japanese: 金 × 絆)	December 4, 2019
Princess Altena tries to ask Genzō to at least protect the citizens, but he is uninterested. Genzō then discovers Hiroyuki is missing. Meanwhile, MAO sees one of Genzō's tournament flyers and figures out where Genzō is. Clause arrives, revealing Hiroyuki is at a noble's mansion. The noble reveals he purchased Hiroyuki for his daughter and refuses to give him back. Altena returns to the castle for money. When the noble's daughter sees Genzō crying, she offers to give Hiroyuki back so the nobleman kindly agrees to sell Hiroyuki back at a reduced price. Genzō learns it was Misha, Wolfgang, and Edgar who stole Hiroyuki so he punishes them. Altena later arrives with a vast pile of money, but finds everyone has left already. Returning home, Genzō finds Joanna, Rose, and MAO in the shop. Rose, Carmilla, Joanna, and Hanako resume their petty arguments until MAO angrily interrupts and challenges Genzō to finish their match. Joanna, assuming MAO is referring to an evil match, also challenges Hanako. Clause suggests including their fights in the next tournament and everyone agrees. Carmilla puts her pride aside and secretly asks Genzō to train her in wrestling so she can finally defeat Rose.
11	"Pride × Loyalty"; Transliteration: "Hokori × Chūsei" (Japanese: 誇り × 忠誠)	December 11, 2019
Genzō begins Carmilla's training but is unsure what exactly to teach her. Meanwhile, Clause and Shigure redesign the wrestling ring to cope with a larger audience. Genzō manages to plan a tournament of five matches, including Misha, Wolfgang and even Princess Altena, with the final match being Genzō versus MAO. The first match sees Heat Haze, Celes, and Altena wrestling demon beasts from Joanna's army, and while they are victorious, Altena finds that public humiliation is quite enjoyable. In the second match, the kobold husband and Orc King defeat Cyclopes from Joanna's army. In the third match, Misha and Wolfgang are easily defeated by gorilla beasts from Joanna's army. In the fourth match, Carmilla wrestles Rose and finds that Genzō's training has made her stronger. Unfortunately, she celebrates too soon so Rose knocks her out with a German suplex. Despite that, Genzō admits it was a good match and Hanako congratulates her on fighting for her own pride, which makes it Carmilla's victory as far as Hanako is concerned. Carmilla cries tears of joy as Genzō prepares to face MAO in the final.
12	"Hero × Demon King"; Transliteration: "Yūsha × Maō" (Japanese: 勇者×魔王)	December 18, 2019
Hanako warns Joanna the match between Genzō and MAO might not go the way she wants. As they begin, MAO rages that Genzō ran away, and in-between their moves they manage to explain what happened and why they are both in this new world. Joanna and Rose begin to worry their Demon King might be an idiot. MAO then reveals he has a phobia of animals so Joanna and Rose steal Hiroyuki. The match turns into a brawl between the beast men and hunters that ends when Genzō defeats MAO. With their rematch finally over, MAO happily agrees to have another one someday. As such, the Hero Army are declared the victors. As Joanna leaves, Hanako warns her that it is her job to observe the hero and she will not tolerate Joanna interfering anymore. Shigure almost loses her temper after realizing that, once again, the profits were wasted, but lets it go after seeing how it has brought humans and beast men together. Princess Altena finds herself looking forward to the next wrestling tournament, while MAO leaves to continue his own training. Life returns to normal as Genzō takes a job to deal with a Minotaur.

== Reception ==
Gadget Tsūshin listed "Kemono Mask", a phrase from Kemono Michi's opening song, in their 2019 anime buzzwords list.
