= Arnie Pantoja =

American actor

- Born: Kansas City, Missouri, U.S.
- Occupation: Actor
- Years active: 2004–present

Arnie Pantoja is an American actor.

== Early life ==
He graduated from East Lake High School in Tarpon Springs, Florida in 2003.

== Career ==
After attending Florida State University for a year, he moved to Los Angeles in 2004 to become a professional actor.

Pantoja has appeared in several commercials and feature films.

== Filmography ==
=== Film ===
| Year | Title | Role | Notes | Ref. |
|---|---|---|---|---|
| 2005 | Vampire Bats | Jason | | |
| 2007 | Sydney White | George | | |
| 2007 | Hallows Point | Rusty | | |
| 2008 | Hamlet 2 | Vitamin J | | |
| 2008 | RoboDoc | Dr. Keefe | | |
| 2015 | Tom and Jerry: Spy Quest | Hadji (voice) | | |
| 2017 | Resident Evil: Vendetta | Damian (voice) | English dub | |
| 2021 | KonoSuba: God's Blessing on this Wonderful World! Legend of Crimson | Kazuma Satou (voice) | English dub | |

=== Anime ===
| Year | Title | Roles | Notes |
|---|---|---|---|
| 2015 | Heroes: Legend of the Battle Disks | Additional voices | English dub |
| 2016 | One-Punch Man | Citizen (Ep. 9), Gunner (Eps. 11-12), Jet Nice Guy (Ep. 8), Watchdog Man (Ep. 10) | English dub |
| 2016 | Charlotte | Leader (Ep. 13) | English dub |
| 2018 | Re:Zero − Starting Life in Another World | Kan | English dub |
| 2018 | JoJo's Bizarre Adventure: Stardust Crusaders | Nukesaku | English dub |
| 2018 | Saint Seiya: The Lost Canvas | Pegasus Tenma | English dub |
| 2018 | March Comes In like a Lion | Eisaku Noguchi | English dub |
| 2019 | KonoSuba: God's Blessing on this Wonderful World! | Kazuma Satou | English dub |
| 2019 | Isekai Quartet | Kazuma Satou | English dub |
| 2021 | Back Arrow | Bit Namital | English dub |

=== Animation ===
| Years | Titles | Roles | Notes |
|---|---|---|---|
| 2018 | We Bare Bears | Chuckles, Knives | Episode: "El Oso" |
| 2018 | Spirit Riding Free | Calvin | Episode: "Lucky and the Cousin Caper" |
| 2018 | Trolls: The Beat Goes On! | Archer Pastry | Recurring role |
| 2020 | Glitch Techs | Nameless | Episode: "The Real Glitch Techs" |
| 2022–24 | Big Nate | Teddy Ortiz | Main role |
| 2022 | The Casagrandes | Devon | Episode: "The Bros in the Band" |
| 2025 | Super Duper Bunny League | Fuzzbot | Recurring role |
| 2026 | Max & the Midknights | Teddy Ortiz | Episode: "The Great Crossover" |

=== Live action TV series ===
| Years | Titles | Roles | Notes |
|---|---|---|---|
| 2017 | Scorpion | Nightingale | Episode: "Faire Is Foul" |
| 2018 | Lucifer | Simon | Episode: "A Devil of My Word" |
| 2018 | Henry Danger | Mark | Episode: "Thumb War" |
| 2019 | Into the Dark | Eddie | Episode: "Down" |
| 2019 | Superstore | Dad Customer | Episode: "Cloud 9 Academy" |
| 2020 | Danger Force | Mark | Episode: "The Danger Force Awakens" |

=== Video games ===
| Years | Titles | Roles | Notes |
|---|---|---|---|
| 2020 | Final Fantasy VII Remake | Reno | English dub |
| 2021 | Re:Zero − Starting Life in Another World: The Prophecy of the Throne | Camberley | English dub |
| 2022 | Crisis Core: Final Fantasy VII Reunion | Reno | English dub |
| 2024 | Final Fantasy VII Rebirth | Reno | English dub |
