= Kazuma Satou =

Fictional character in the KonoSuba series

Kazuma Satō
- KonoSuba character
- Kazuma as seen in promotional artwork for KonoSuba: Fantastic Days
- First appearance: "Oh! My Useless Goddess!"; December 20, 2012
- Created by: Natsume Akatsuki
- Voiced by: Jun Fukushima (Japanese); Arnie Pantoja (English); Ryōta Ōsaka (Drama CD)
- Birthday: June 7

In-universe information
- Alias: Satou Kazuma
- Gender: Male
- Occupation: Adventurer
- Affiliation: Japan (formerly); Kingdom of Belzerg
- Weapon: chunchunmaru (Japanese sword)
- Family: Unnamed parents Unnamed brother
- Significant other: Megumin
- Nationality: Japanese

Kazuma Satou (Japanese: 佐藤 和真, Hepburn: Satō Kazuma; also spelt Kazuma Sato), known mononymously as Kazuma (カズマ) is the main protagonist of the light novel, manga and anime series KonoSuba, created by Natsume Akatsuki. He is voiced by Jun Fukushima in Japan and by Arnie Pantoja in English-speaking regions. He was a shut-in NEET until his untimely death and reincarnation into an RPG-esque fantasy world, where he becomes an adventurer and forms his own dysfunctional party. Initially shown to be cynical and sarcastic, he can show selflessness and compassion towards his friends and competence as a leader. His main goals are to defeat the demon king and his generals, to return to Japan, and to realize the aspects of his new life.

Kazuma has generally received positive reception for his unique traits and as a deconstruction of the isekai protagonist trope, being known as one of the best isekai protagonists. His dry sense of humour and ad-libs done by Jun Fukushima are widely praised. Contrarily, he has also received some criticisms for some of his character traits and personality, especially his acts of perversion.

== Creation ==
Concept art of Kazuma illustrated by Kurone Mishima in the official series art book Mishima Kurone Artbook KonoSuba Cheers!

During production for the anime series, Jun Fukushima decided to give Kazuma a voice with charm as well as insinuating focus on the realism behind the character's voice delivery. During test recordings he began ad-libbing interruptions to characters who opened a sentence by addressing Kazuma by name, feeling that in real life people tend to respond immediately when they hear their name spoken, rather than waiting for the other person to finish their sentence. Many of these ad-libs ended up being included in the final scripts.

== Characteristics ==
Kazuma is a Japanese teenager that initially dressed in a green and black tracksuit, and later on adorns a green cape with a golden stripe around the edges, a gray shirt with a white tunic, gray pants, dark brown boots with his natural attributes adorning brown hair and green eyes in the anime. His design in the earlier volumes of the light novels has black hair and black eyes to match his Japanese origin, but it was later changed to match his anime counterpart.

Kazuma's personality can vary. He is generally erratic, tends to insult or belittle others that annoy him, and has a pessimistic and cynical attitude. He also shows rash behavior, such as leading a counterattack against the Destroyer which destroys a noble's house, thus warranting his arrest. He can show kindness and leadership with his party and with others, at times willingly helping out someone such as Aqua after one of the Demon King's generals made her sad or Darkness with her familial affairs. He is also lazy and a pervert. He cares for all of his companions and has earned the name of "Tsundere" from Megumin for refusing to acknowledge it. Kazuma is also selfless, such as the time when he could have made Megumin learn Advanced Magic that would have enabled her to become much more of a help to the party but instead chose to boost the power of her Explosion Magic as he did not want her to sacrifice her dreams. Through flashbacks, it is revealed that Kazuma became a shut in NEET after seeing his childhood friend who had promised to marry him riding on a senior boy's bike. Almost all of Kazuma's romantic knowledge comes from anime, visual novels and other entertainment materials, which made him pretty inept at responding to heartfelt feelings in the beginning. He grows close to Megumin when she confesses to him and grows a relationship with her when he acknowledges his own feelings to Megumin. Regarding the romantic relationship between Kazuma and Megumin, author Natsume Akatsuki intentionally chose not to shine too much focus on it, wanting to write a proper comedy spin-off on the two.

=== Abilities ===
Kazuma's signature weapon is his sword, and he is more experienced in short-range melee combat. He also uses weapons like his bow, which has precise aim using his "Snipe" skill. Being an adventurer, he is able to learn a variety of other skills from other classes such as Mana Swap, Freeze, Create Water and Steal. These abilities have to usually be taught to him by other characters before he can use them, and he cannot learn advanced skills. Thus, he combines basic skills for more powerful attacks, such as combining his ice and water skills during his rematch with Kyouya Mitsurugi. Statiscally, Kazuma is average in most traits but has above average intelligence and abnormally high luck. Due to this, he nearly put an entire casino into bankruptcy due to his consistent wins. However, due to his low-level class, Kazuma is prone to getting slain multiple times in combat against especially powerful opponents, prompting Aqua to revive him. Kazuma is also extremely skilled in battle strategy, often finding creative ways to utilise his party's specialised skillsets in order to defeat enemies in the most efficient way possible. When fighting alone, he often uses underhanded tactics to compensate for his lack of raw power, such as creating earth and blowing it in the eyes of his enemies or using "Steal" as a distraction. With the immense wealth that he gathers through the course of the series, he buys more expensive equipment such as high grade manatites to cast stronger spells.

== Character biography ==
As a shut-in NEET who was heartbroken by his crush in middle school, Kazuma confined himself to his room playing video games and reading manga due to his lack of social confidence. He dies from acute stress reaction after attempting to save a classmate from a tractor which he mistook for a speeding truck. In the Heavenly Realm, he meets Aqua, who voices impatience while he is deciding on an asset to take with him on his quest to defeat the Devil King. Out of spite, he chooses her as that asset. They recruit Megumin and Darkness into the party. Despite initially giving up on trying to defeat the Devil King, Kazuma and his party encounter the generals through various ordeals. During Volume 5 of the light novels, it is hinted that Megumin begins developing romantic feelings for him and vice versa. This expands into a love triangle between him, Megumin and Darkness in the later volumes. Ultimately, Kazuma and Megumin engage in a state that is described as "more than friends, less than lovers".

During Volume 6, Kazuma is exiled from the Kingdom of Belzerg after realizing the Chivalrous Thief was Chris and reluctantly admits failure. Due to his dire situation, he agrees to assist Chris in infiltrating the royal castle after a conspiracy of the royal family begins to spread word. After figuring out that Chris was the goddess Eris, he agrees to help steal the Sacred Armor Aigis. While initially failing, they get the armor after Eris reveals her true identity and the armor accepts her. After engaging and defeating the other Demon Generals, Kazuma and Aqua have a talk over whether to fight the Demon King. This results in Aqua running off to face the Demon King herself. His stats are reset to 1. After discovering that due to a lack of personal skills, he could regain his levels quickly, he ventures to the hardest dungeon available with the assistance of Wiz and Vanir. After gaining his levels back, Kazuma sets off to defeat the Demon King and rescue Aqua from any further peril. Despite having the option to return to Japan as initially promised, Kazuma chooses to stay in Belzerg along with his friends.

=== In other media ===
Kazuma and other characters from his series make appearances in the gag-crossover Isekai Quartet. He also makes appearances within several KonoSuba video games, usually being a playable character or a main character. His most prominent video game appearance is in the side-scroller KonoSuba: God's Blessing on this Wonderful World! Revival of Beldia where he sets off to free Aqua, Megumin and Darkness from the possession of the Demon General Beldia. He also makes an appearance in the KonoSuba CD Drama, although he is voiced by Ryōta Ōsaka.

== Reception ==
Kazuma has generally received positive reception for his role in the story as a subversion of traditional Isekai cliches that were present at the time. This trait was emphasized in a review for the first season of the anime with Max Iorio noting the stark contrast of circumstances between many other isekai protagonists and Kazuma. Rebecca Silverman of Anime News Network gave similar praise, describing him as "the most laid-back hero to find himself plopped down in a fantasy setting". Further analysis of his unorthodox characterization was exhibited in a Comic Book Resources article with author Louis Kemner citing examples such as the pointlessness of his initial death, his relationship with Aqua, his constant strive for money, and the lack of any noble cause. Lynn of The Otaku Author praised the comedic value of his luck stat, stating that his luck perfectly balanced out his other stats and complemented his shut-in lifestyle. His comedic chemistry with Megumin would also be praised in an Anime Kansou review. This sentiment was reciprocated in a review in for the film KonoSuba: God's Blessing on This Wonderful World! Legend of Crimson with Jordan Ramée of GameSpot praising the character development and the romantic undertones between the two. Similar praise was directed at the high amount of screentime Kazuma received and his role in the film but with certain gags being criticized due to their nature. In an analysis conducted in a Medium article on the character, author Alphonso L. Masé places emphasis on his introspection skills and his resilience.

In a review for the episode "A Betrothed for This Noble Daughter!", Meni praised Kazuma's role in the episode, finding hilarity in his duel with Darkness. While initially being more critical of Kazuma's characteristics, BanjoTheBear of The Chuuni Corner commended his nicer and comedic aspects. Similarly, Kazuma was praised by SD Pict for his character development, noting that he's gone a long way from a NEET to someone who's more outgoing and reliable. The character was also praised for the performance of Jun Fukushima for his performance as well as the ad-libs he would give Kazuma. FandomSpot author R. Romero ranked him as the third best Isekai protagonist in anime. MoviesRulz ranked him second among the 10 unluckiest isekai protagonists. Kazuma was nominated for Best Boy at the 2nd Crunchyroll Anime Awards. He has also enjoyed consistent popularity within the light novel guide Kono Light Novel ga Sugoi!. He would appear five times from 2017 to 2021 within the top 10 male characters rankings with his highest result being ranked sixth in the 2020 polls. He has been frequently compared to Subaru Natsuki from Re:Zero − Starting Life in Another World due to their many similarities in terms of character and series premise. The comparisons were frequent enough to where they were noted in Isekai Quartet throughout several gags.

== Primary sources ==
- Akatsuki, Natsume (February 21, 2017). Konosuba: God's blessing on this wonderful world! 1, Oh! My useless Goddess! (First Yen On ed.). New York, NY. ISBN 978-0-31-655337-7.
- Akatsuki, Natsume (April 24, 2018). Konosuba: God's blessing on this wonderful world! 5, Crimson Magic Clan, let's & go!! (First Yen On ed.). New York, NY. ISBN 978-0-31-646878-7.
- Akatsuki, Natsume (August 21, 2018). Konosuba: God's blessing on this wonderful world! 6, The Princess of the Six Flowers (First Yen On ed.). New York, NY. ISBN 978-0-31-646880-0.
- Akatsuki, Natsume (December 11, 2018). Konosuba: God's blessing on this wonderful world! 7, 10 Millions Bride (First Yen On ed.). New York, NY. ISBN 978-0-31-646882-4.
- Akatsuki, Natsume (April 23, 2019). Konosuba: God's blessing on this wonderful world! 8, Axis Cult vs Eris Cult (First Yen On ed.). New York, NY. ISBN 978-0-31-646885-5.
- Akatsuki, Natsume (August 27, 2019). Konosuba: God's blessing on this wonderful world! 9, The Crimson Fate. New York, NY. ISBN 978-1-97-538503-3.
- Akatsuki, Natsume (December 17, 2019). Konosuba: God's blessing on this wonderful world! 10, Gamble Scramble! (First Yen On ed.). New York, NY. ISBN 978-1-97-533234-1.
- Akatsuki, Natsume (October 20, 2020). Konosuba: God's blessing on this wonderful world! 12, Lullaby of a Female Knight (First Yen On ed.). New York, NY. ISBN 978-1-97-533238-9.
- Akatsuki, Natsume (June 22, 2021). Konosuba: God's blessing on this wonderful world! 14, The Crimson Demon's Trial (First Yen On ed.). New York, NY. ISBN 978-1-97-533242-6.
- Akatsuki, Natsume (October 26, 2021). Konosuba: God's blessing on this wonderful world! 15, Cult Syndrome (First Yen On ed.). New York, NY. ISBN 978-1-97-533244-0.
- Akatsuki, Natsume (April 19, 2022). Konosuba: God's blessing on this wonderful world! 16, Runaway Goddess, Come Home! (First Yen On ed.). New York, NY. ISBN 978-1-97-534204-3.
- Akatsuki, Natsume (August 2, 2022). Konosuba: God's blessing on this wonderful world! 17, God's Blessing on These Wonderful Adventurers! (First Yen On ed.). New York, NY. ISBN 978-1-97-534310-1.
