= KonoSuba =

Japanese light novel series and its adaptations

- KonoSuba: God's Blessing on This Wonderful World!
- First light novel volume cover, featuring Kazuma Satou (left) and Aqua (right). Megumin and Darkness also appear as small characters.

この素晴らしい世界に祝福を！ (Kono Subarashii Sekai ni Shukufuku o!)
- Genre: Fantasy comedy; Isekai
- Novel series
- Written by: Jitakukeibihei (Natsume Akatsuki)
- Published by: Shōsetsuka ni Narō
- Original run: December 20, 2012 – October 21, 2013
- Light novel
- Written by: Natsume Akatsuki
- Illustrated by: Kurone Mishima
- Published by: Kadokawa Shoten
- English publisher: NA: Yen Press
- Imprint: Kadokawa Sneaker Bunko
- Original run: October 1, 2013 – May 1, 2020
- Volumes: 17
- Manga
- Written by: Natsume Akatsuki
- Illustrated by: Masahito Watari
- Published by: Fujimi Shobo
- English publisher: NA: Yen Press
- Magazine: Monthly Dragon Age
- Original run: September 9, 2014 – present
- Volumes: 23
- Anime television series
- Directed by: Takaomi Kanasaki (Note: Credited as Chief Director (総監督, Sō Kantoku) for the third and fourth seasons); Yujiro Abe (S3); Manabu Kurihara (S4)
- Produced by: Rie Ogura; Kouichi Sano (S3); Hiroyasu Taniguchi (S3); Hideo Momota (S3)
- Written by: Makoto Uezu
- Music by: Masato Kōda
- Studio: Studio Deen (S1–2); Drive (S3); ENGI (S4)
- Licensed by: Crunchyroll (streaming) (Note: Anime Limited holds home video distribution rights in the United Kingdom and Ireland, and Crunchyroll Store Australia holds a separate license from Crunchyroll.; This series was originally licensed by Crunchyroll, then owned by The Chernin Group and AT&T, prior to its acquisition by Sony's Funimation Global Group in 2021. Funimation itself is owned as a joint venture between Sony Pictures Entertainment and Sony Music Entertainment Japan (Aniplex).); NA: Discotek Media (home video; S1-2 only); SEA: Medialink
- Original network: Tokyo MX
- English network: SEA: Animax Asia
- Original run: January 14, 2016 – present
- Episodes: 31 + 4 OVAs
Further information
Light novel
Consulting With This Masked Devil!
Written by	Natsume Akatsuki
Illustrated by	Kurone Mishima
Published by	Kadokawa Shoten
Imprint	Kadokawa Sneaker Bunko
Magazine	The Sneaker Web
Original run	September 25, 2015 – December 25, 2015
Volumes	1
Light novel
KonoSuba: God's Blessing on this Wonderful World! Extra Attention to that Wonderful Fool!
Written by	Hirukuma
Illustrated by	Yūki Hagure
Published by	Kadokawa Shoten
Imprint	Kadokawa Sneaker Bunko
Original run	August 1, 2017 – present
Volumes	8
Manga
KonoSuba: God's Blessing on this Wonderful World! Extra Attention to that Wonderful Fool!
Written by	Hirukuma
Illustrated by	Tamako Buta
Published by	Media Factory
Magazine	Monthly Shōnen Ace
Original run	January 26, 2018 – January 24, 2020
Volumes	2
Light novel
KonoSuba: God's Blessing on this Wonderful World! Detour!
Written by	Natsume Akatsuki
Illustrated by	Kurone Mishima
Published by	Kadokawa Shoten
Imprint	Kadokawa Sneaker Bunko
Original run	January 1, 2020 – February 28, 2026
Volumes	4
Manga
Consulting With This Masked Devil!
Written by	Natsume Akatsuki
Illustrated by	Suzume Somemiya
Published by	Media Factory
Imprint	Kadokawa Sneaker Bunko
Magazine	Monthly Comic Alive
Original run	February 27, 2018 – January 26, 2019
Volumes	2
Light novel
KonoSuba: God's Blessing on this Wonderful World! Fantastic Days
Written by	Hirukuma
Illustrated by	Kurone Mishima
Published by	Kadokawa Shoten
English publisher	NA: Yen Press
Published	March 1, 2022
Volumes	1
Manga
KonoSuba: God's Blessing on this Wonderful World! Fantastic Days
Illustrated by	Kasumi Morino
Published by	Media Factory
Magazine	Monthly Comic Alive
Original run	March 26, 2022 – May 27, 2024
Volumes	4
- Anime film
- KonoSuba: God's Blessing on This Wonderful World! Legend of Crimson
- Related
- KonoSuba: An Explosion on This Wonderful World!
- icon

KonoSuba: God's Blessing on This Wonderful World!, (Note: Japanese: この素晴らしい世界に祝福を！, Hepburn: Kono Subarashii Sekai ni Shukufuku o!; lit. 'A Blessing on This Wonderful World!') often referred to simply as KonoSuba, is a Japanese light novel series written by Natsume Akatsuki and illustrated by Kurone Mishima. The series follows Kazuma Satou, a boy who is sent to a fantasy world with RPG video game elements. Following his death, he forms a dysfunctional adventuring party with a goddess, an explosive archmage, and a masochist crusader.

Akatsuki wrote the series with the intention of setting a contrast with typical fantasy tropes. The series was serialized as a web novel on Shōsetsuka ni Narō between December 2012 and October 2013, KonoSuba was published as a printed light novel series by Kadokawa Shoten under the company's Kadokawa Sneaker Bunko imprint from October 2013 to May 2020. The light novel series features a divergent plot.

A manga adaptation, illustrated by Masahito Watari, began serialization in Fujimi Shobo's Monthly Dragon Age magazine in October 2014. An audio drama CD was released by HobiRecords in March 2015, and an anime television series adaptation produced by Studio Deen aired in Japan between January and March 2016. A second season of the anime aired between January and March 2017. A spin-off light novel series, KonoSuba: An Explosion on This Wonderful World!, was published from July 2014 to June 2015. Both the light novels and the manga are licensed in North America by Yen Press. An anime film adaptation produced by J.C.Staff, titled KonoSuba: God's Blessing on This Wonderful World! Legend of Crimson, premiered on August 30, 2019. An anime television series adaptation of An Explosion on This Wonderful World!, produced by Drive, aired from April to June 2023. A third season, also by Drive, aired from April to June 2024. A fourth season, produced by ENGI, is set to premiere in 2027.

By November 2021, the series had 10 million copies in circulation. The series received positive reception from critics and fans, with both the light novels and the anime adaptation receiving multiple awards. Critics praised the anime for its humor and voice acting, but its animation quality and the fittingness to a comedy series have received mixed reception. The series' characters have also proven to be popular, with Megumin ranking highly in multiple polls and awards.

== Premise ==
Following an untimely and embarrassing death, Kazuma Satou, a Japanese teenage shut-in NEET, meets a goddess named Aqua, who offers to reincarnate him in a parallel world with MMORPG elements, where he can go on adventures and battle monsters. Despite being offered a superpowered item or ability to use in this new world, Kazuma, following some provocation, spitefully chooses Aqua herself to accompany him to the town of Axel, quickly finding her absent-mindedness to be less than beneficial.^{LN 1.P} With Aqua unable to return to the afterlife until the Devil King is defeated, the two form a party and recruit two other members; an explosion-obsessed magician named Megumin and a masochistic crusader named Darkness.^{LN 1.2.4} Due to the party's dysfunctional abilities, Kazuma quickly gives up on the idea of defeating the Devil King and tries to live a comfortable lifestyle, only to find the circumstances of his daily life are forcing him and his party to encounter and battle the Devil King's generals.^{LN 2.3}

== Development ==
=== Novel ===
Akatsuki had been a fan of novels since youth, reading series such as Record of Lodoss War, Slayers, and Sorcerous Stabber Orphen. Record of Lodoss War was the first novel he read, which became an influence in his interest in fantasy. He is also a fan of the game Kantai Collection, admitting he came up with his pen name while playing it. Prior to writing KonoSuba, he had submitted a draft to a light novel contest but was told he needed to work on the basics of novel writing. He continued writing to practice his skills before deciding to pursue writing more seriously. He wanted to write a series different from typical light novel series, with it having a story that would contrast against expectations about the fantasy genre. The series' fantasy elements were derived from fantasy video games like Wizardry and Final Fantasy, as well as tabletop role-playing games.

In writing the characters, Akatsuki aimed to give each one distinctive quirks, regardless of how trivial they might seem, citing Aqua's interest in unusual rocks as an example. Some characters developed differently from their original conception; for instance, Mitsurugi was initially intended to serve as a rival to Kazuma's party but instead became another eccentric and foolish character. Akatsuki has stated that the supporting characters Dust and Vanir are his favorites.

=== Anime ===
Akatsuki first learned that an anime adaptation was in development in January 2015. At the time, he was living in Fukui Prefecture and had been called to a meeting in Tokyo. However, he was unable to go as his house was buried in snow, leading to him being informed of the anime adaptation via phone.

Koichi Kikuta and Momoka Komatsu served as chief animation directors for the series, with the former working on odd-numbered episodes and the latter on even-numbered. While Komatsu's character designs closely resembled those of the light novels and had more attractive appearances, Kikuta based his designs on children's shows like Pokémon as he felt KonoSuba's story was similar to those found in them.

== Publication ==
=== Web novel ===
Akatsuki released the original web novel series on Shōsetsuka ni Narō from December 20, 2012, to October 21, 2013, under the pen name Jitakukeibihei (自宅警備兵). Following its publication as a book, the web novel was removed from the website on December 10, 2013. The author also wrote a side story featuring Wiz and Vanir.

=== Light novels ===
A light novel version with illustrations by Kurone Mishima was released under Kadokawa Shoten's Kadokawa Sneaker Bunko imprint from October 1, 2013, to May 1, 2020. The light novel diverges significantly from the web novel's plot from the sixth volume onwards, and also features changes to the characters' ages. The final book in the series, Volume 17, contains information in its Afterword on possible future development that the teased "After Story" spin-offs might contain.

A Megumin-focused spin-off light novel series, also written and illustrated by Akatsuki and Mishima respectively, titled KonoSuba: An Explosion on This Wonderful World! (Note: この素晴らしい世界に爆焔を！, Kono Subarashii Sekai ni Bakuen o!; lit. "Give Explosions to This Wonderful World!") and takes place a year prior to the main series, was released from July 1, 2014, to June 1, 2015, in three volumes. A two-volume sequel, KonoSuba: An Explosion on This Wonderful World! Bonus Story, (Note: 続・この素晴らしい世界に爆焔を！, Zoku: Kono Subarashii Sekai ni Bakuen o!; lit. "Sequel: Give Explosions to This Wonderful World!") was released on December 28, 2016, and March 1, 2019.

Another spin-off featuring Vanir was published on April 1, 2016, called Consulting With This Masked Devil! (Note: この仮面の悪魔に相談を！, Kono Kamen no Akuma ni Sōdan o!)

A third spin-off series titled KonoSuba: God's Blessing on This Wonderful World! Extra Attention to that Wonderful Fool! (Note: この素晴らしい世界に祝福を！エクストラ あの愚か者にも脚光を！, Kono Subarashii Sekai ni Shukufuku o! Ekusutora Ano Orokamono ni mo Kyakkō o!; lit. "Bless Me in This Wonderful World! Extra: Attention Also to That Fool!") began publication on August 1, 2017. It is written by Hirukuma and illustrated by Uihime Hagure, and features Dust as the central character.

A series of short story collections, KonoSuba: God's Blessing on this Wonderful World! Detour!, (Note: この素晴らしい世界に祝福を! よりみち4回目!, Kono Subarashii Sekai ni Shukufuku o! Yorimichi!) compiling both previously published and new stories by Akatsuki and Mishima, was released in four volumes from January 1, 2020, to February 28, 2026.

A light novel adaptation of KonoSuba Fantastic Days smartphone game, written by Hirukuma and illustrated by Mishima, was published on March 1, 2022.

Yen Press announced on May 20, 2016, that it had licensed the light novels for release in North America. The first volume was released in conjunction with the second manga volume on February 21, 2017, with the last volume released on August 2, 2022. On June 20, 2023, Yen Audio released the first volume of the light novel as an audiobook. They also released the Fantastic Days novel on July 18, 2023.

== Adaptations ==
=== Manga ===
A manga adaptation of KonoSuba illustrated by Masahito Watari began serialization in the October 2014 issue of Fujimi Shobo's Monthly Dragon Age magazine on September 9, 2014. As of August 7, 2026, twenty three tankōbon volumes have been released. Yen Press announced its acquisition of the manga adaptation at the same time that it licensed the original light novels.

A manga adaptation of Extra Attention to that Wonderful Fool! novels, illustrated by Tamako Buta, was published in Media Factory's Monthly Shōnen Ace magazine from January 26, 2018, to January 24, 2020, and compiled into two volumes.

A manga adaptation of Consulting With This Masked Devil! novel, illustrated by Suzume Somemiya, was published in Media Factory's Monthly Comic Alive magazine from February 27, 2018, to January 26, 2019, and compiled into two volumes.

A manga adaptation of the KonoSuba Fantastic Days smartphone game by Kasumi Morino was published in Monthly Comic Alive from March 26, 2022, to May 27, 2024, and compiled into four volumes.

=== Anime ===
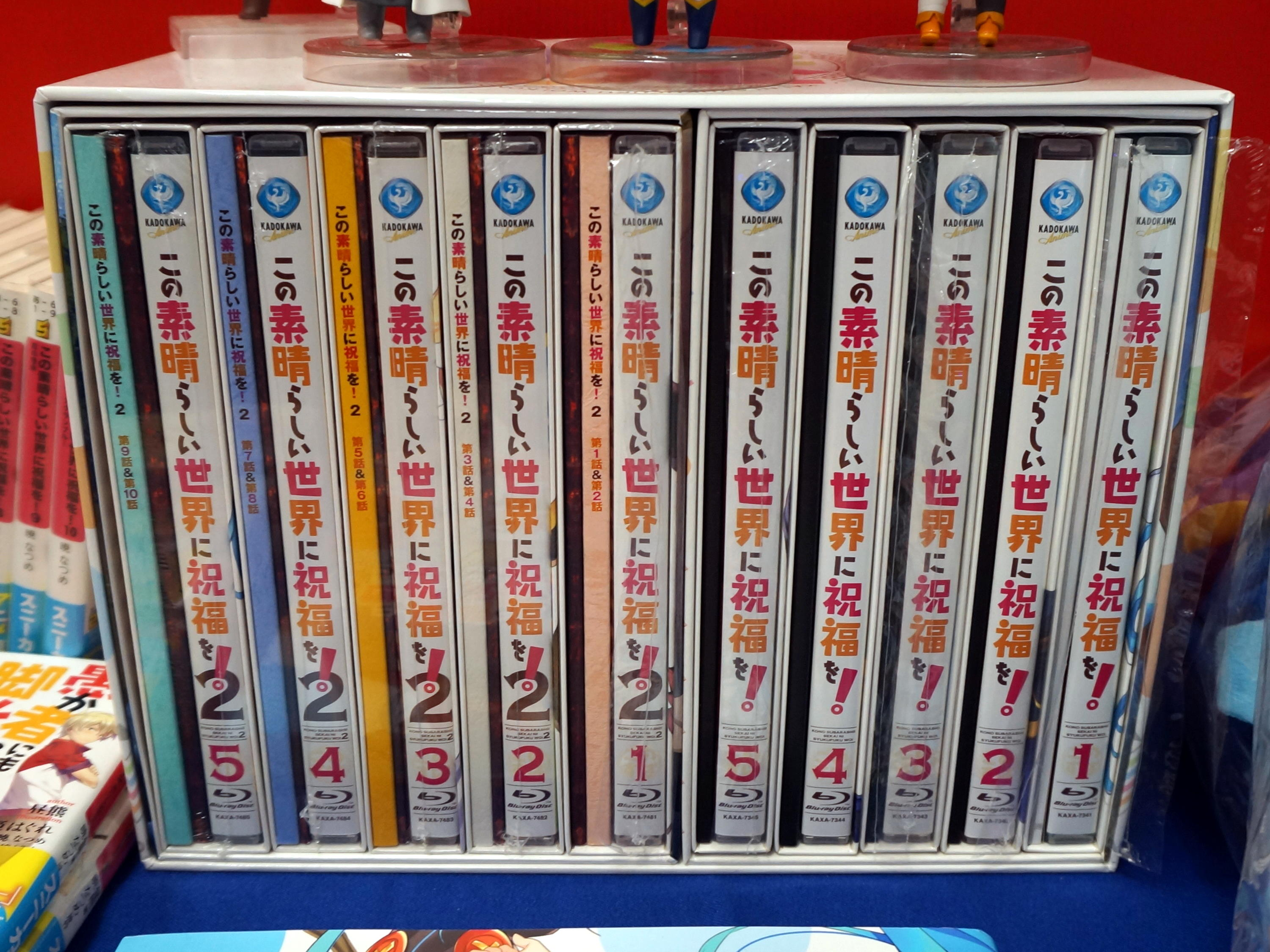
A box set of the Japanese Blu-ray release by Kadokawa Video of the first season and Season 2.

In May 2015, Kadokawa announced that an anime television series adaptation of KonoSuba was green-lit. It was produced by Studio Deen and directed by Takaomi Kanasaki, with scripts written by Makoto Uezu and character designs by Koichi Kikuta. The first season aired on Tokyo MX from January 14 to March 16, 2016; (Note: Tokyo MX listed the air dates for the first two seasons as Wednesday at 25:05 JST, which is effectively Thursday at 1:05 a.m.) it was later broadcast on eight other networks and several video on demand streaming networks. The series was simulcast by Crunchyroll in several regions such as North America, and by AnimeLab in Australia. An original video animation (OVA) was bundled with the ninth light novel volume of KonoSuba in June 2016. Crunchyroll released an English-language dub of the series on January 15, 2019. Discotek Media released the first season and its OVA on Blu-ray in North America on May 26, 2020.

A second season was announced after the airing of the first season's final episode. Kanasaki returned to direct the season at Studio Deen, with Uezu and Koichi also reprising their roles as the scriptwriter and character designer. The season aired on Tokyo MX from January 12 to March 16, 2017. Crunchyroll later added the second season. A second OVA was bundled with the light novel's twelfth volume, which was released on July 24, 2017. An English-language dub of the season was released on Crunchyroll on February 25, 2020. Discotek Media released the second season and OVA on Blu-ray in North America on February 23, 2021.

In October 2018, it was announced that characters from KonoSuba would appear in Isekai Quartet, a crossover anime also featuring characters from Re:Zero, Overlord, and The Saga of Tanya the Evil. The series aired from April to June 2019, and later spawned two more seasons and a film.

In July 2021, the official Twitter account for the KonoSuba anime confirmed that a new anime project was in production. The project was later revealed to be a third season of the main series and an anime television series adaptation of KonoSuba: An Explosion on This Wonderful World! Both series were produced by Drive and directed by Yujiro Abe, with chief direction by Takaomi Kanasaki. The rest of the main staff returned from previous seasons. KonoSuba: An Explosion on This Wonderful World! aired on Tokyo MX from April 6 to June 22, 2023. (Note: Tokyo MX listed the air dates for An Explosion on This Wonderful World! as Wednesday at 25:00 JST, which is effectively Thursday at 1:00 a.m.) The third season aired on Tokyo MX from April 10 to June 19, 2024. Crunchyroll also licensed both series. A third OVA was released theatrically in Japan on March 14, 2025, and on Blu-ray and DVD on April 25.

A sequel to the anime series was announced in March 2025, which was later revealed to be a fourth season. It will be produced by ENGI and directed by Manabu Kurihara, with Kanasaki returning as chief director. The season is set to premiere in 2027.

==== Music ====
Masato Kōda composed the music for all three seasons and the adaptation of An Explosion on This Wonderful World! He is set to return as composer for the fourth season. For the first season, the opening theme is "Fantastic Dreamer" by Machico, and the ending theme is "Chiisana Bōkensha" (Note: ちいさな冒険者; lit. "Little Adventurer") performed by Aqua (Sora Amamiya), Megumin (Rie Takahashi), and Darkness (Ai Kayano). The second season's opening theme is "Tomorrow" by Machico, and the ending theme is "Ouchi ni Kaeritai" (Note: お家に帰りたい; lit. "Want to Go Home") by Aqua (Amamiya), Megumin (Takahashi), and Darkness (Kayano). For An Explosion on This Wonderful World!, the opening theme is "Stay Free" by Machico, and the ending theme is "Jump In" by Megumin (Takahashi) and Yunyun (Aki Toyosaki). The opening theme for the third season is "Growing Up" by Machico, and the ending theme is "Ano Hi no Mama no Bokura" (Note: あの日のままのぼくら; lit. "Us, Just Like on That Day") by Aqua (Amamiya), Megumin (Takahashi), and Darkness (Kayano).

=== Theatrical film ===
In July 2017, Jun Fukushima and Takahashi, the voice actors of Kazuma and Megumin respectively, announced plans for a new KonoSuba anime project. In June 2018, a film adaptation was announced to be in development at J.C.Staff. The cast and staff reprised their roles from the television series. Titled KonoSuba: God's Blessing on This Wonderful World! Legend of Crimson, (Note: この素晴らしい世界に祝福を！紅伝説, Kono Subarashii Sekai ni Shukufuku o! Kurenai Densetsu) the film was released in Japan on August 30, 2019. Crunchyroll began streaming the English subtitled and English dub version on March 25, 2020, and on January 1, 2021, respectively.

=== Video games ===
A PC video game developed by game creator Tachi, titled KonoSuba: God's Blessing on this Wonderful World! In The Life, (Note: この素晴らしい世界に祝福を！in the life, Kono Subarashii Sekai ni Shukufuku o! In The Life) is included in the first Blu-ray/DVD volume of the anime series on March 25, 2016. The game is developed using the software RPG Maker VX Ace. Another video game, created by Team Ladybug and Krobon, titled KonoSuba: God's Blessing on this Wonderful World! Revival of Beldia, (Note: この素晴らしい世界に祝福を！復活のベルディア, Kono Subarashii Sekai ni Shukufuku o! Fukatsu no Berudia) is included in the limited edition of first Blu-ray/DVD volume of the anime series' second season and was released on April 28, 2017. The game is a side-scroller with gameplay resembling the Mega Man series.

A visual novel adaptation for PlayStation Vita and PlayStation 4, KonoSuba: God's Blessing on this Wonderful World! Judgment on this Greedy Game!, (Note: この素晴らしい世界に祝福を！ -この欲深いゲームに審判を！, Kono Subarashii Sekai ni Shukufuku o! Kono Yokubukai Gēmu ni Shinpan o!) was developed and published by 5pb. (later known as Mages), and was released in Japan on September 7, 2017. The game features an original story, in which Kazuma discovers a cursed ring that allows him to steal the underwear of others near him. He learns the only way to undo the curse would be by raising enough money. Judgment on this Greedy Game! introduces an "Underwear Judgment" system, where the player assists Kazuma in returning lost underwear to its rightful owner. Like the anime, Machico performed the opening "Million Smile", and Amamiya, Takahashi, and Kayano sang the game's ending theme "101 Pikime no Hitsuji". A Nintendo Switch port of the game was released on the Nintendo eShop on December 17, 2020.

The sequel to KonoSuba: God's Blessing on this Wonderful World! Judgment on this Greedy Game!, a visual novel with outfit crafting mechanics, KonoSuba: God's Blessing on this Wonderful World! Love For These Clothes Of Desire! (Note: この素晴らしい世界に祝福を！～この欲望の衣装に寵愛を～, Kono Subarashii Sekai ni Shukufuku o! Kono Yokubō no Ishō ni Chōai o!) was released on September 24, 2020, for the PS4 and Switch in Japan. The game features a story where Kazuma's party discovers a slab that can create clothing but curses them with personality changes in exchange. A western release of the game, including a Microsoft Windows port, came out on February 8, 2024.

A dungeon crawler game for the PS4 and Vita, titled KonoSuba: God's Blessing on this Wonderful World! Labyrinth of Hope and the Gathering of Adventurers!, (Note: この素晴らしい世界に祝福を！～希望の迷宮と集いし冒険者たち～, Kono Subarashii Sekai ni Shukufuku o! Kibō no Meikyū to Tsudoishi Bōkenshatachi) was released in Japan on June 27, 2019. An updated version of the game, KonoSuba: God's Blessing on this Wonderful World! Labyrinth of Hope and the Gathering of Adventurers! Plus, (Note: この素晴らしい世界に祝福を！～希望の迷宮と集いし冒険者たち～Plus, Kono Subarashii Sekai ni Shukufuku o! Kibō no Meikyū to Tsudoishi Bōkenshatachi Plus) was released in Japan on August 27, 2020, for the PS4 and Nintendo Switch. A dungeon RPG, KonoSuba: God’s Blessing on this Wonderful World! Cursed Relic and the Perplexed Adventurers, (Note: この素晴らしい世界に祝福を！～呪いの遺物と惑いし冒険者たち～) was released for PS4 and Switch in 2022.

A mobile gacha RPG titled KonoSuba: God's Blessing on this Wonderful World! Fantastic Days (Note: この素晴らしい世界に祝福を！ファンタスティックデイズ, Kono Subarashii Sekai ni Shukufuku o! Fantasutikku Deizu) was released for iOS and Android devices on February 27, 2020. It was developed by CyberAgent subsidiary Sumzap, with Nexon Korea handled the global release, in which the mobile game launched worldwide outside Japan on August 19, 2021. The game's global publishing rights were later transferred to Sesisoft on June 1, 2023. On January 30, 2025, official service for the game was discontinued following nearly five years of support.

=== Audio CDs ===
An audio drama CD, featuring a different voice cast to the anime, was released by HobiRecords on March 1, 2015. A second drama CD, along with an original soundtrack by Kouda Masato and a character song album, was released in March 2017.

== Reception ==
=== Popularity ===
The KonoSuba light novels have been popular. By March 2, 2016, the 11-volume series had a total of 1.5 million copies in print, each volume selling 136,000 copies on average. In January 2018, the light novel series ranked first among the top 50 best selling digital manga and light novels in worldwide stores by BookWalker. By February 2019, the light novels had 6.5 million copies in print. By November 2021, the novels had a total circulation of 10 million copies. In a review of the first novel, Andy Hanley of UK Anime Network praised the series' comedy reflected in the "tired genre" as well as its cast finding them appealing based on their traits. However, Hanley criticized the short length of the first volume. The series won BookWalker's 2016 Grand Prix Award.

In 2016, the anime was voted as the tenth-best TV anime in the Newtype 2015–16 Awards. KonoSuba also finished runner-up for Best Comedy in the Crunchyroll's Anime Awards 2016 to Haven't You Heard? I'm Sakamoto. In 2019, the anime won "Isekai Series of the Decade" at the Funimation's Decade of Anime poll, where the fans voted for their favorite anime across multiple categories.

=== Critical response ===
KonoSuba: God's Blessing on This Wonderful World is an anime that has a lot of fun mocking the tropes of the typical JRPG fantasy world via a colorful cast of characters that are enjoyable in their own right. The comedy is so spot-on with its deadpan nature that it's hard not to be drawn in by that alone.

— Richard Eisenbeis, in his review of the anime

Like its light novel counterpart, the anime has received positive reception for its comedy, parody of the isekai genre, and faithful adaptation of the light novels. Reviewing the first few episodes, Anime News Network (ANN)'s Theron Martin described the second episode as "the funniest episode of anime I have seen since Monthly Girls' Nozaki-kun aired", while also praising the series' musical score. The voice acting has also been a subject of praise; Nick Creamer of ANN commended Sora Amamiya and Rie Takahashi's roles as Aqua and Megumin for the energy provided in their performances, while Martin applauded Jun Fukushima for his work in voicing Kazuma, considering his dry tone an additional factor in the show's humor.

From the Legend of Crimson's release in Japan, Daryl Harding, writing for Crunchyroll News praised the story and comedy of the film noting that the "classic humor of (the TV series) translates well to a film runtime." Daryl Harding did criticise the film by stating that "It doesn't look too different than the TV series" even with "more effects placed over the animation during scenes of explosive magic."

In contrast, a common criticism of the anime was its inconsistent character animation, one that was described as "low budget" as characters appeared off-model. Koichi Kikuta responded by stating such design was intentional, hoping to "bring out the individuality of each character" rather than the prettier artwork in the light novels; to do this, Kikuta's animation displayed "their more human sides, like their unflattering traits and their distressed moments." Crunchyroll's Kim Morrissy considered the animation to be humorous, especially fitting in a comedic anime. Kotaku writer Richard Eisenbeis explained much of the series' humor derives from the deconstruction of Kazuma's hopes of becoming the hero of a fantasy world, instead realizing he is forced to struggle his way through the world. Comparing Kazuma's problems in a fantasy world to those in real life, Creamer wrote about a sense of relatability between the series' protagonists and the audience, as the party deals with issues like debt and taking questionable jobs because of high pay. On a critical note, Creamer disapproved of Kazuma's negative attitude, which he felt harmed the comedy in the series.

KonoSuba's characters, especially those in Kazuma's party, have garnered favorable reactions in the anime community. Creamer described the group as possessing a "strange but endearing chemistry," as the members are unfriendly with one another, yet are close. Morrissy added the party's "emotional bond is also evident in the ways they interact with each other. My favorite thing about the anime is that it takes the time to draw these nuances out onscreen and express them with visual flair." Megumin in particular has been considered one of the series' most popular characters, winning Sneaker Bunko's official Favorite KonoSuba Character poll. She was also the sixth-highest vote in Newtype's 2015–16 Awards for Best Female Character (Kazuma was third in the male category) and received the most "Other" votes in the Best Girl category in Crunchyroll's Anime Awards 2016. In an interview with internet personality The Anime Man, Natsume Akatsuki described Megumin as giving off "a pure and elegant atmosphere" like one of an anime heroine or waifu, hence her popularity among fans.

== Notes ==
LN notes

^LN represents the light novel series in X.Y format, where X represents the volume number and Y represents the chapter number.

Original titles
