= Natsume Akatsuki =

Japanese light novel author and manga writer

Natsume Akatsuki 暁なつめ
- Born: Echizen, Japan
- Occupations: Light novelist, manga writer
- Writing career
- Pen name: Jitakukeibihei (Shōsetsuka ni Narō username); Hideaki Natsuki (8th MF Bunko J Light Novel Rookie Award submission name, Shōsetsuka ni Narō username)
- Language: Japanese
- Period: 2013–present
- Genres: Light novel, comedy
- Notable works: KonoSuba; Kemono Michi; Combatants Will Be Dispatched!
- Website: natsumeakatsuki.blog.fc2.com

Natsume Akatsuki (暁なつめ, Akatsuki Natsume) is a Japanese light novel author and manga writer. He is best known as the creator of the KonoSuba series.

== Career ==
In 2012, Akatsuki entered his debut work Dragontarashi (ドラゴンたらし) for the 8th MF Bunko J Light Novel Rookie Award under the pen name Hideaki Natsuki (夏希秀明, Natsuki Hideaki). However, it only made it to the second round. After that, he began posting his writing to the user-generated novel website Shōsetsuka ni Narō under the same name.

On August 19, 2012, under the name Sentōin Sangō (戦闘員三号, Sangō Sentōin), he began serializing Combatants Will Be Dispatched!, which concluded on September 10 of the same year with 68 chapters. In the same month, under the name Yōki na America Jin (陽気なアメリカ人), he published Saikyō no Katanakaji (最強の刀鍛冶). After this, he closed his account.

After a short time, Akatsuki created a new account on Shōsetsuka ni Narō under the username Jitakukeibihei (自宅警備兵) and begun uploading once again. He published Ninja ga Isekai Iri (忍者が異世界入り) before taking it down, only making the work available again on February 1, 2013.

On December 20, 2012, he began serializing KonoSuba, which finished on October 21, 2013, with 124 chapters. It was announced in the same year that KonoSuba would be published by Kadokawa Shoten under their Sneaker imprint. On December 10, 2013, KonoSuba was taken off the Shōsetsuka ni Narō website.

March 27, 2013, saw the release of the KonoSuba side-story Kamen Akuma ga Miru Yume wa (仮面悪魔が見る夢は). The same work would be published in book form on April 1, 2016, as Kono Kamen no Akuma ni Sōdan o! (この仮面の悪魔に相談を！).

Akatsuki officially debuted on October 1, 2013, with the first volume of KonoSuba being published in book form.

On October 1, 2014, he released his first novel, Dragontarashi, for free on his blog.

In 2016, he would write and begin publishing the manga Kemono Michi. It would receive an anime adaptation in 2019.

KonoSuba received an anime adaptation in 2016. It would later on have a sequel anime in 2017 followed by a movie in 2019.

Akatsuki's Combatants Will Be Dispatched! started publishing on November 1, 2017. It received an anime adaptation in 2021.

== Works ==
=== Novels ===
==== KonoSuba ====
- KonoSuba: God's Blessing on This Wonderful World! (illustrated by Kurone Mishima, published by Kadokawa Sneaker Bunko, 17 volumes, 2013–2020)
  - KonoSuba: An Explosion on This Wonderful World! (illustrated by Kurone Mishima, published by Kadokawa Sneaker Bunko, 3 volumes, 2014–2015)
    - KonoSuba: An Explosion on This Wonderful World! Bonus Story (illustrated by Kurone Mishima, published by Kadokawa Sneaker Bunko, 2 volumes, 2016–2019)
  - Consulting With This Masked Devil! (illustrated by Kurone Mishima, published by Kadokawa Sneaker Bunko, 1 volume, 2016)
  - KonoSuba: God's Blessing on this Wonderful World! Detour! (illustrated by Kurone Mishima, published by Kadokawa Sneaker Bunko, 4 volumes, 2020–2026)
  - KonoSuba: God's Blessing on this Wonderful World! Extra Attention to that Wonderful Fool! (illustrated by Kurone Mishima, published by Kadokawa Sneaker Bunko, 8 volumes, 2017–present)
  - KonoSuba: God's Blessing on this Wonderful World! Fantastic Days (illustrated by Kurone Mishima, published by Kadokawa Sneaker Bunko, 1 volume, 2022)

==== Combatants Will Be Dispatched! ====
- Combatants Will Be Dispatched! (illustrated by Kakao Lanthanum, published by Kadokawa Sneaker Bunko, 7 volumes, 2017–present)

=== Manga ===
- Kemono Michi (illustrated by Mattakumo-suke; Yumenuta, published in Monthly Shōnen Ace, 14 volumes, 2016–2024)

=== Other credits ===
- Re:Zero − Starting Life in Another World (anime announcement narration writer; Episodes 18, 25)
- Combatants Will Be Dispatched! (animation script cooperation; Episode 10)
