= Makoto Uezu =

Japanese anime screenwriter

- Born: Osaka Prefecture, Japan
- Occupation: Screenwriter

Makoto Uezu (上江洲 誠, Uezu Makoto) is a Japanese anime screenwriter.

== Filmography ==
=== Anime television ===
==== 2000s ====
- Ground Defense Force! Mao-chan (2002), Script
- Bottle Fairy (2003), Script
- Maburaho (2003–04), Script
- Yumeria (2004), Series composition (with Yōsuke Kuroda), Script
- Ah My Buddha (2005), Series composition, Script
- Amaenaide yo!! Katsu!! (2006), Series composition, Script
- Ah! My Goddess: Flights of Fancy (2006), Script
- Utawarerumono (2006), Series composition, Script
- My Bride Is a Mermaid (2007), Series Composition, Script
- School Days (2007), Series Composition, Script
- Sola (2007), Script
- Akaneiro ni Somaru Saka (2008), Series Composition, Script
- Astro Fighter Sunred (2008), Series Composition, Script
- Astro Fighter Sunred season 2 (2009), Series Composition, Script
- Tayutama: Kiss on my Deity (2009), Series Composition, Script

==== 2010s ====
- Katanagatari (2010), Series Composition, Script
- The Qwaser of Stigmata (2010), Series Composition, Script
- Carnival Phantasm (2011), Series Composition, Script
- Is This a Zombie? (2011), Series Composition, Script
- Kamisama Dolls (2011), Series Composition, Script
- The Qwaser of Stigmata II (2011), Series Composition, Script
- The Legend of Heroes: Trails in the Sky OVA (2011), Script
- Humanity Has Declined (2012), Series Composition, Script
- Is This a Zombie? of the Dead (2012), Series Composition, Script
- Space Brothers (2012–2014), Series Composition, Script
- Devil Survivor 2: The Animation (2013), Series Composition, Script
- Danganronpa: The Animation (2013), Series Composition, Script
- Arpeggio of Blue Steel (2013), Series Composition, Script
- D-Frag! (2014), Series Composition, Script
- Akame ga Kill! (2014), Series Composition, Script
- Yuki Yuna Is a Hero (2014), Series Composition, Script
- Assassination Classroom (2015), Series Composition, Script
- Rampo Kitan: Game of Laplace (2015), Series Composition, Script
- The Heroic Legend of Arslan (2015), Series Composition, Script
- Wooser's Hand-to-Mouth Life: Phantasmagoric Arc (2015), Script
- Assassination Classroom Final Season (2016), Series Composition, Script
- KonoSuba (2016), Series Composition, Script
- The Heroic Legend of Arslan: Dust Storm Dance (2016), Series Composition
- KonoSuba season 2 (2017), Series Composition, Script
- Scum's Wish (2017), Series Composition, Script
- Boruto: Naruto Next Generations (2017), Script
- Yuki Yuna Is a Hero: Washio Sumi Chapter (2017), Series Composition, Script
- Yuki Yuna Is a Hero: Hero Chapter (2017), Series Composition, Script
- Radiant (2018), Script
- Kengan Ashura (2019), Script
- Radiant season 2 (2019), Script

==== 2020s ====
- Drifting Dragons (2020), Series Composition
- Fate/Grand Carnival (2021), Series Composition, Script
- Yuki Yuna Is a Hero: The Great Mankai Chapter (2021), Series Composition, Script
- Rumble Garanndoll (2021), Series Composition, Script
- Play It Cool, Guys (2022), Series Composition
- KonoSuba: An Explosion on This Wonderful World! (2023), Series Composition
- KonoSuba season 3 (2024), Series Composition
- Necronomico and the Cosmic Horror Show (2025), Series Composition
- Iron Wok Jan (2026), Series Composition
- KonoSuba season 4 (2027), Series Composition
- Maiden Blood (2027), Series Composition

=== Anime films ===
- Aura: Koga Maryuin's Last War (2013), Composition
- KonoSuba: God's Blessing on This Wonderful World! Legend of Crimson (2019), Script
- Assassination Classroom the Movie: Our Time (2026), Script
