= Kurone Mishima =

Japanese illustrator

Kurone Mishima (三嶋 くろね Misima Kurone) is a Japanese illustrator from Saitama Prefecture. She is best known as the illustrator of the KonoSuba and Akashic Records of Bastard Magic Instructor light novels.

== Works ==
=== Light novels ===
- KonoSuba
- Mangetsu no Jinrou to Hangetsu no Vampire
- Next Haven
- Ore no Real to Netoge ga Love Comedy ni Shinshokusare Hajimete Yabai
- Ore to Kanojo no Battle wa Living de
- Akashic Records of Bastard Magic Instructor

=== Manga ===
- 4-koma Koushiki Anthology: Toaru Kagaku no Railgun x Toaru Majutsu no Index
- Choujigen Game Neptune: The Animation - Dengeki Comic Anthology
- Hataraku Maou-sama! High School!
