= List of anime companies =

This is a list of anime industry companies involved in the production or distribution of anime.

== Japan-based companies ==
=== Animation studios ===
There are over 500 animation studios in Japan. Below are those notable enough to have an article.

- A.C.G.T
- A.P.P.P. (defunct)
- A-1 Pictures
- Actas
- Ajiado
- Anime International Company (AIC)
- Arms Corporation (defunct)
- Artland
- Artmic (defunct)
- Arvo Animation
- Ashi Productions
- Asahi Production
- Asread
- Atelier Pontdarc
- AXsiZ
- Aniplex
- Bandai Namco Filmworks
- Bandai Namco Pictures
- Bee Train
- Bibury Animation Studios
- Blue Lynx
- Bones
- Brain's Base
- Bridge
- Bug Films
- C2C
- Chaos Project
- Cloud Hearts
- CoMix Wave Films
- Connect (defunct, absorbed by Silver Link and then dissolved)
- Creators in Pack
- C-Station
- CygamesPictures
- Daume
- David Production
- Diomedéa
- DLE
- Doga Kobo
- Drive
- ENGI
- EMT Squared
- Eight Bit
- Eiken
- Ekachi Epilka
- Encourage Films
- Ezóla
- Fanworks
- Feel
- Felix Film
- Gaina
- Gainax (defunct)
- Gallop
- Geno Studio
- Geek Toys
- GEMBA
- GoHands
- Gonzo
- Graphinica
- Grizzly
- Group TAC (defunct)
- Hoods Entertainment
- Imagin
- J.C.Staff
- Khara
- Kinema Citrus
- Kitayama Eiga Seisakujo (defunct)
- Kitty Films (defunct)
- Kokusai Eiga-sha (defunct)
- Kyoto Animation
- Lapin Track
- Larx Entertainment
- Lay-duce
- Lerche
- Liden Films
- Madhouse
- Magic Bus
- Maho Film
- Manglobe (defunct)
- Marza Animation Planet
- MAPPA
- Millepensee
- Mook Animation
- Mushi Production
- NAZ
- Nexus
- Nippon Animation
- Nomad
- NUT
- Oh! Production
- OLM
- Okuruto Noboru
- Orange
- Ordet
- P.A. Works
- Palm Studio (defunct)
- Passione
- Pierrot
- Pine Jam
- Platinum Vision
- Polygon Pictures
- Production I.G
- Production IMS (defunct)
- Project No.9
- Radix Ace Entertainment (defunct)
- Remic
- Revoroot
- Robot Communications
- Satelight
- Sanzigen
- Science Saru
- Shaft
- Shin-Ei Animation
- Shirogumi
- Shuka
- Seven
- Seven Arcs
- Sony, through Aniplex
  - A-1 Pictures
  - CloverWorks
- Spectrum Animation (defunct)
- Signal.MD
- Silver Link
- Square Enix Image Studio Division
- Studio 3Hz
- Studio 4°C
- Studio A-Cat
- Studio Bind
- Studio Blanc
- Studio Chizu
- Studio Colorido
- Studio Comet
- Studio Deen
- Studio Fantasia (defunct)
- Studio Ghibli
- Studio Gokumi
- Studio Hibari
- Studio Kai
- Studio Nue
- Studio Orphee
- Studio Ponoc
- Studio Puyukai
- Studio VOLN
- Sunrise (defunct/absorbed into Bandai Namco Filmworks in 2022)
- SynergySP
- Tatsunoko Production
- Tear Studio (defunct)
- Tezuka Productions
- TMS Entertainment (formerly Tokyo Movie Shinsha)
  - Telecom Animation Film
- Tengu Kobou
- TNK
- Tsuchida Production (defunct)
- Toei Animation
- Topcraft (defunct)
- Typhoon Graphics
- Triangle Staff (defunct)
- Troyca
- Trigger
- Ufotable
- White Fox
- Wit Studio
- Xebec (defunct, mostly sold to Sunrise)
- Yaoyorozu (defunct)
- Yokohama Animation Laboratory
- Yumeta Company (formerly known as TYO Animations)
  - Hal Film Maker (defunct/absorbed into Yumeta Company after merger of previous Yumeta and Hal into TYO Animations)
- Zexcs
- Zero-G

=== Producers ===
- Animax
- Avex
- Bandai Visual
- BROCCOLI
- Bushiroad
- Dentsu
- Genco
- Geneon Universal Entertainment (Geneon USA, formerly Pioneer LDC, now NBCUniversal Entertainment Japan)
- Good Smile Company
- Hakuhodo DY Media Partners
- J-List
- Japan Home Video
- Kadokawa Shoten
- King Records / Starchild
- Konami
- KSS
- Mag Garden
- NBCUniversal Entertainment Japan
- Warner Bros. Japan
- Nihon Ad Systems
- Nintendo
- Pony Canyon
- Shinca Entertainment
- Soft On Demand
- Sony
  - Sony Music Entertainment Japan
    - Aniplex
- Sotsu
- Square Enix
- Shochiku
- The Pokémon Company (Nintendo owns 32%.)
- Toho
- VAP
- Victor Entertainment
- Youmex (defunct)

== Non-Japanese companies ==
=== Distributors ===
==== North America and other regions ====
- Amazon Inc. (International)
  - Prime Video (International)
- AMC Networks
  - Sentai Filmworks (U.S.)
  - HIDIVE (U.S.)
- Animation International
- AnimEigo (U.S.)
- Anime Matsuri (U.S.)
- Discotek Media (U.S.)
- Disney (U.S.)
  - Hulu (U.S.)
- Eleven Arts (U.S., movies only)
- Hasbro Entertainment (U.S., includes properties acquired by parent Hasbro from its purchase of Saban Brands)
- Fakku (U.S.)
- GKIDS (U.S.)
- Konami Cross Media NY (U.S.) (formerly known as 4Kids Productions and 4K Media Inc.; 4Kids Productions shut down in 2012 by 4Kids Entertainment, acquired by Konami and rebranded as 4K Media from 2012 to 2019).
- Media Blasters (U.S.)
- Netflix (International)
- NIS America (U.S., American subsidiary of Nippon Ichi Software )
- Ponycan USA (U.S., American subsidiary of Pony Canyon)
- Shout! Factory (U.S.)
- Sony (International)
  - Aniplex of America (U.S., American subsidiary of Aniplex owned by Sony Music Entertainment Japan)
  - Sony Pictures Home Entertainment (U.S.)
  - Sony Pictures Television (U.S.)
    - Crunchyroll (International)
- Viz Media (U.S., owned jointly by Shogakukan and Shueisha of Japan, run independently)
- Warner Bros. Discovery (U.S.)
  - Warner Bros. Television (U.S.)
- Universal Television (U.S.)

==== South America ====
- Editorial Ivrea (Argentina)
- JBC (Brazil)
- Panini Group (Brazil and Argentina)

==== Europe ====
- Anime Limited (United Kingdom, France and Ireland)
- Dybex (France, Belgium, Netherlands)
- Dynit (Italy, Switzerland)
- MVM Films (UK)
- Naban Animé (France, Belgium, Switzerland)
- Universum Film GmbH (Germany)
- Sony (International), through Crunchyroll
  - Crunchyroll EMEA (France, Germany, Switzerland)
    - Crunchyroll UK and Ireland (United Kingdom)
- StudioCanal UK (UK)
- Universal Pictures (UK, Ireland)
- Yamato Video (Italy)

==== Southeast Asia, South Asia, and East Asia ====
- Animation International (Hong Kong)
- Aniplus (South Korea, Singapore)
- Bilibili (China)
- Medialink (Hong Kong)
- Metal seinen (Pakistan)
- Muse Communication (Taiwan)
- Odex (Singapore)
- KC Global Media Entertainment LLC (Singapore)

==== Australia and New Zealand ====
- Sony (International), through Crunchyroll
  - Crunchyroll Store Australia
- Sugoi Co

==== Defunct ====
- ADV Films (U.S., U.K.) (shut down in 2009, selling off its assets and intellectual properties to four other Houston-based companies, such as Section23 Films)
- AN Entertainment (U.S., division of AnimeNation, no new releases since 2007. Retail operations of parent company ceased in 2014.)
- Bandai Entertainment (U.S., owned by Bandai Namco Entertainment)
  - Bandai Visual USA (U.S., previously a subsidiary of Bandai Visual Japan and not affiliated with Bandai Entertainment, now folded into Bandai Entertainment)
- Beez Entertainment (EU, owned by Bandai)
- Central Park Media (de facto defunct since mid-2007 when new DVD releases ceased; although they continued to license their titles for TV and VOD, they entered a state of limbo. Officially declared bankruptcy and assets liquidated in mid-2009. Several of their titles have been acquired by other anime distributing companies prior to and following Central Park Media's bankruptcy and liquidation, such as ADV Films, Bandai Entertainment, Funimation Entertainment, Media Blasters, Nozomi Entertainment, etc.)
  - US Manga Corps (U.S., part of Central Park Media)
  - Software Sculptors (U.S., part of Central Park Media)
- Family Home Entertainment (U.S., renamed Artisan Entertainment) in the 1990s, then acquired by Lions Gate Entertainment in 2003)
- Funimation (U.S., acquired by Sony in 2017 and merged with Crunchyroll in 2024)
- Frontier Enterprises (Japan, Dubbed anime into English from 1964 to 2000)
- Geneon Entertainment (U.S. branch "Geneon USA" (formerly "Pioneer Entertainment"), defunct September 2007. Parent Japanese company ceased in-house distribution of its own titles, many of which have been re-licensed by Funimation and Sentai Filmworks. Parent company "Geneon Entertainment" then sold off its own ownership to NBCUniversal subsidiary UPI, which then merged Geneon with its own "Universal Pictures Japan" division on February 1, 2009, renaming the new company "Geneon Universal Entertainment Japan").
- Go Fish Pictures (U.S. subsidiary of DreamWorks)
- Hanabee Entertainment (Australia and New Zealand)
- Illumitoon Entertainment (U.S., de facto defunct since late-2007 when new DVD releases were cancelled)
- Kadokawa Pictures USA (U.S., American subsidiary of Kadokawa Pictures)
- Kazé (Europe acquired by Crunchyroll)
- Magna Home Entertainment (Australia and New Zealand)
- Manga Entertainment (UK, U.S.: Established as L.A. Hero in 1990, brought by Island World Communications in late 1994 and renamed Manga Entertainment in 1995, bought by Anchor Bay Entertainment in 2005, later bought by Lionsgate in 2016)
- Manga Entertainment UK (the main branch of "Manga Entertainment")
- Miramax (U.S., previously owned by Disney until 2010 when it was acquired by Filmyard Holdings)
- NuTech Digital (U.S.)
- it:Panini Video (Germany and Italy)
- Ponimu (Indonesia)
- Right Stuf Inc.
- Saban Brands (U.S., shuttered in 2018 after selling entertainment properties to Hasbro)
- Saban Entertainment (U.S., acquisitions either went to The Walt Disney Company or just expired, succeeded by Saban Brands)
- Shinca Entertainment (U.S.)
- it:Shin Vision (Italy)
- Streamline Pictures (U.S., Canada; stopped producing new anime releases in 1996. The Streamline brand name officially went defunct in 2002.)
- Synch-Point (U.S., a subsidiary of Broccoli, defunct when parent company Broccoli International USA shut down their operations in 2007)
- Tokyopop (U.S.) (still exists but no longer produces, distributes or licenses anime)
- U.S. Renditions (U.S., a subsidiary of Books Nippan, defunct mid-1990s)
- Urban Vision (U.S.)

=== Producers ===
- Harmony Gold USA (U.S.)
- Nelvana (Canada)
- Sav! The World Productions (FRA)
- World Events Productions (U.S.)
