= Nazotokine =

Japanese anime television series

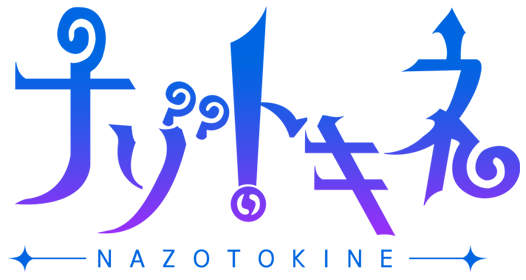

ナゾトキネ
- Anime television series
- Directed by: Naoya Fukushi
- Produced by: Hikaru Nakatsugawa
- Written by: Yūki Hasegawa; Ayumi Masui
- Music by: Pony Canyon
- Studio: Tengu Kobou
- Original network: Tokyo MX, GYT
- Original run: October 5, 2016 – December 21, 2016
- Episodes: 12
- Anime television series

Kaito × Ansa
- Directed by: Naoya Fukushi
- Written by: Kōhei Katō
- Studio: Tengu Kobou
- Original network: AT-X, Tokyo MX, GYT, BS Fuji, RNC
- Original run: July 12, 2017 – September 27, 2017
- Episodes: 12

Nazotokine (ナゾトキネ; lit. Mystery Tokine) is a Japanese anime television series produced by studio Tengu Kobou. It premiered on October 5, 2016, on Tokyo MX.

== Plot ==
The story revolves around puzzle-solving.

== Characters ==
Tokine Amino
Voiced by: Natsuko Hara
The main protagonist of the story. Tokine was a regular 22-year-old woman, working as a secretary to the CEO of a company known as TEN2. After being swept into the world of Quizzun to solve riddles, Tokine possesses the power to discover the truth, and this aids her greatly in solving the riddles given to her. Her best friends are Yoshie and Kyouka.
Hacchin
Voiced by: Sora Tokui
A little creature that resembles both a rabbit and a pig, showing Tokine the rules of Quizzun and granting her the special power of discovering truth. He is called a pig by Tokine and a rabbit by Natsuko.
Kyouka Mizukami
Voiced by: Eriko Matsui
An employee at TEN2 and works at the front desk with Yoshie. She is best friends with Yoshie and Tokine and has a younger sister named Kyouko. Her family runs a hot spring on the edge of the country.
Yoshie Yamasumi
Voiced by: Sarara Yashima
An employee at TEN2 and works at the front desk with Kyouka. She is best friends with Tokine and Kyouka and often treats them to meals.
Natsuko Yanagisawa
Voiced by: Mikoi Sasaki
An employee at TEN2 and a former cabaret member. She used her connections to get into the company and is looked down upon by Yoshie. Her real name is Tokuyo Nazo. Like Tokine, she is able to use her full capabilities in Quizzun, and the two possess similar powers and thinking strategies.
Kyouko Mizukami
Kyouka's younger sister and friends with Hinata and Mamori. She is currently in high school and works at the counter of the hot spring facility which is owned and run by her family.
Kaito Aen
Voiced by: Kazuki Katou
Ansa Arishin
Voiced by: Takahiro Sakurai

== Media ==
=== Anime ===
The anime is created and directed by Naoya Fukushi, with animation by Tengu Kobou. Hitomi Takano is designing the characters and Hiroyuki Moriyama is serving as chief photography director. Hiroaki Yabunaka is in charge of the sound effects and Hikaru Nakatsugawa is producing the series. Yūki Hasegawa and Ayumi Masui are collaborating on the writing of the scenario. Dream Vision's Takanori Morita is in charge of making the puzzles to solve. Yuzu Fujisaki performed the opening theme song "Dimension Sky", and aki performed the ending theme song "destiny." Crunchyroll simulcasts the anime.

A second anime created and directed by Naoya Fukushi, with animation by Tengu Kobou premiered on July 12, 2017, on Tokyo MX.

==== Episode list ====
No.	Title (Note: All English titles are taken from Crunchyroll.)	Original release date
1	"Solve It, Then Think About It!" "Hodoite kara kangaeru!" (解いてから考える！)	October 5, 2016
Tokine Amino is a regular 22-year-old young woman, working as the CEO's secretary for a company known as TEN2. Her good friends Yoshie Yamazumi and Kyouka Minakami, who both work at the front desk are also briefly introduced. As Tokine gets ready for work, all the while babbling excitedly about an anime director coming for a meeting, she unlocks the door to her room only to find herself in an inter-dimensional 3D world called Quizzun, where she comes across a creature she assumes to be a pig. The 'pig' introduces itself to the surprisingly calm Tokine as Hacchin, explaining that she has been chosen, and is thus unable to leave Quizzun unless she solves all the riddles given to her. With that, Hacchin rewards her with a special power to unlock truth.
2	"They're After the Q-Stone" "Nerawa reta Q sutōn" (ねらわれたQストーン)	October 12, 2016
With much complaint over her new look, Hacchin patiently explains that the remarkably revealing outfit helps her unlock her fullest potential, and after some quarrelling, Tokine sets to solving the riddles. With only three minutes left from her original five minutes time limit after bickering, Tokine quickly learns that there are no penalties given for wrong answers, and using her new powers, quickly solves the riddle by rearranging the pictures to their given titles, then piecing together the letters they spell. As she rejoices, Hacchin takes from her a green gem called the Q-stone, existing only in human minds when it experiences pleasure of an eureka moment. As promised, Hacchin lets her leave.
3	"Vehicle" "No ri mo no" (の・り・も・の)	October 19, 2016
After a busy day at work, Tokine manages to catch the last train at midnight back home, but while in the train gets transported back into Quizzun, along with the other commuters on the train. She notices that Hacchin was indeed telling the truth with most humans being unable to use more than 10% of their capabilities, and she once more sets to solving a new and harder riddle, this time with the commuters' innocent lives on the line.
4	"There Are Other People in the Quiz?!" "Jibun igai wa kuizu" (自分以外はクイズ)	October 26, 2016
With the simple instructions to "connect in order", Tokine nearly runs out of time but manages to solve it by using the colours and letters of the stations whispered by the dazed commuters, producing another wonderfully large Q-stone in the process. She then opens her eyes to find herself back in the train, and everyone is staring at her. Embarrassed, Tokine rushes home, and receives a text from Yoshie, informing her that she will be moving to Tachikawa, and requests her help, to which Tokine happily accepts.
5	"Moving to Takros" "Takurosu ni o hikkoshi" (タクロスにお引越し)	November 2, 2016
As Yoshie and Kyouka go down with one of the movers to help collect stuff, Tokine stays behind with the other two, and gets transported once more to Quizzun, along with the movers in a tow.
6	"Quizun is Suddenly..." "Kuizu n wa totsuzen ni" (クイズンは突然に)	November 9, 2016
Prior to Tokine's question, Hacchin tells her that Quizzun is triggered into being when potentially-high humans like herself experience excitement or sheer pleasure. As she looks at the clues carefully, she applies the colours of the animal blocks and the animals in English, while checking for the "space" between North and South, two words that the movers are constantly whispering. Tokine solves it faster than the previous one, as the answer was plain to be seen from the very beginning, and producing another Q-stone. After the tiring afternoon, to thank Kyouka and Tokine for their hard work, Yoshie treats them to dinner at a BBQ meat restaurant, where they discuss plans for the company trip to Minakami Hot Springs, a business run by Kyouka's family. In all their fun and laughter however, a strange couple sitting behind them is overhearing every word they are saying.
7	"An Exciting, Fantastic Company Trip" "Harahara wakuwaku shain ryokō" (ハラハラわくわく社員旅行)	November 16, 2016
During the company trip, the strange couple at the restaurant is surprisingly following them, confirming that they are employees of TEN2. At the hot spring, they meet Kyouka's younger sister Kyouko, and her friends from high school Hinata Takaragawa and Mamori Sonazawa. While stripping, Tokine gets transported back to Quizzun with her dearest friends, to face not a riddle, but a dragon.
8	"What's Sengokushi?" "Izumi goku kokorozashi ttenandesuka?" (泉極志って何ですか？)	November 23, 2016
Tokine successfully solves the riddle while avoiding attacks from the dragon by linking the colors of the girls' towels, hexagons, and hovering balls that change colour, while signalling the dragon's time to attack, and she syncs the dragon's words, once more in English with the letters on the colors. Returning to the hot spring, Hinata, feeling less shy towards her new friends, invites them to come to a pro-wrestling match with her as she has extra tickets.
9	"Earth-Shattering Sound" "Karada ga furueru (kyokubaku)" (体が震える（極爆）)	November 30, 2016
The girls have a great afternoon the next day. Apart from the exciting match, tea is held at Yoshie's lovely new house and they watch a movie at a nearby theater in the evening. At the theater, they once again encounter the strange couple, and the lady, Natsuko Yanagisawa, is revealed to be a former cabaret member who used her connections to get into the company. As Tokine grows excited over the movie, she is transported back to Quizzun again, along with all the people in the cinema, but this time, she is not the only one who can use her full abilities.
10	"The Q Stone Starts to Grow?!" "Sodachi hajimeta? ! Q sutōn" (育ち始めた？！Qストーン)	December 7, 2016
Natsuko can move, speak and think along with Tokine, who is shocked. As Hacchin appears however, he blurts out that Tokuyo Nazo is Natsuko's real name, and the two girls begin competition for completion of the riddle first. Both solve it at the same time, and they are released back into the real world together.
11	"The Amazing Final Problem!" "Kandō no saishū mondai!" (カンドウの最終問題！)	December 14, 2016
After the relaxing day, the girls return separately to school and work. The threesome then head to glimpse a spectacular light show after work. Things get caught up in Quizzun again, as another challenging problem crops up for Tokine to solve.
12	"Hmm?! What Happens in the Last Episode?" "N? ! Dōyara saishūkai!" (ん？！どうやら最終回！)	December 21, 2016
After hard thought and a wrong answer, the riddle is solved yet again, along with another Q-stone. For the first time after collecting it, Hacchin stays to talk to her, explaining that Quizzun is a world created by human insight born from Q-stones, a reason why he is constantly collecting hers. The energy in Quizzun is circulated here and returned to Earth, and the places where it has appeared before are known as power spots which have different effects on people like purity and good luck. As he leaves, Hacchin informs Tokine that a change will be coming over her, and bids goodbye. The next morning, Tokine wakes up to find the sky an unsightly purplish color, along with Hacchin by her bed, announcing that he has a present for her.

No.	Title	Original release date
1	"O hanashi" (おはなし)	July 12, 2017
