= No-Clipping My Way to Supremacy! =

Japanese light novel series

- First light novel volume cover

最弱な僕は＜壁抜けバグ＞で成り上がる ～壁をすり抜けたら、初回クリア報酬を無限回収できました！～ (Saijaku na Boku wa "Kabenuke Bug" de Nariagaru: Kabe o Surinuketara, Shokai Clear Hōshū o Mugen Kaishū Dekimashita!)
- Genre: Fantasy
- Novel series
- Written by: Nikita Kitagawa
- Published by: Shōsetsuka ni Narō
- Original run: February 24, 2021 – present
- Light novel
- Written by: Nikita Kitagawa
- Illustrated by: Meto Sasame
- Published by: Kodansha
- Imprint: Kodansha Ranobe Books
- Original run: June 2, 2022 – May 2, 2024
- Volumes: 2
- Manga
- Written by: Nikita Kitagawa
- Illustrated by: Yui Hata
- Published by: Kodansha
- English publisher: Kodansha (digital)
- Imprint: Monthly Shōnen Magazine Comics
- Magazine: Magazine Pocket
- Original run: June 24, 2022 – present
- Volumes: 12
- Anime television series
- Directed by: Haruki Kasugamori
- Written by: Hiroshi Hosokawa
- Music by: Kyōhei Matsuno
- Studio: Durandal; Tengu Kobou
- Original run: 2027 – scheduled

No-Clipping My Way to Supremacy! (Note: Japanese: 最弱な僕は＜壁抜けバグ＞で成り上がる ～壁をすり抜けたら、初回クリア報酬を無限回収できました！～, Hepburn: Saijaku na Boku wa "Kabenuke Bug" de Nariagaru: Kabe o Surinuketara, Shokai Clear Hōshū o Mugen Kaishū Dekimashita!) is a Japanese web novel series written by Nikita Kitagawa. It was originally posted on the online publishing platform Shōsetsuka ni Narō in February 2021, before being published as a light novel series by Kodansha under its Kodansha Ranobe Books imprint between June 2022 and May 2024; the novels feature illustrations by Meto Sasame. A manga adaptation illustrated by Yui Hata began serialization in Kodansha's Magazine Pocket service in June 2022, and has been compiled into twelve volumes as of July 2026. An anime television series adaptation produced by Durandal and Tengu Kobou is set to premiere in 2027.

== Plot ==
The series follows Henri Cleats, an adventurer who only has a single skill: Evasion. Wanting to take care of his sickly younger sister Colette, he joins a party. However, due to weak attack power and lack of skills, he is expelled from this party. However, it turns out that his evasion skill comes with a bonus: he is able to pass through walls and reach the end of dungeons without defeating the boss. Thus, he is able to claim a dungeon's First Clear bonus more than once. With his newfound knowledge, Henri sets out to clear as many dungeons as he can while also leveling up his power.

== Characters ==
Henri Cleats (アンリ・クリート, Anri Kurīto)
Voiced by: Riko Aono
An adventurer whose only skill is evasion. He takes care of Colette and aimed to be an adventurer to earn enough money to care for her. His attack power is weak, being only 100, which causes him to be bullied by his partymates. After he is expelled from his party, he explorers a dungeon alone, where he accidentally discovers the quirk with his evasion ability.
Colette (エレレート, Ererēto)
Voiced by: Momoka Terasawa
Henri's younger sister.
Auroia (オーロイア, Ōroia)
Voiced by: Nao Ojika
Don (ドン)
Voiced by: Kengo Tsujii
Guillermo (ギジェルモ, Gijerumo)
Voiced by: Tatsuhisa Suzuki
Scarlet (スカーレット, Sukāretto)
Voiced by: Anna Yamaki
Latch (ラッチ, Ratchi)
Voiced by: Shun Horie
Maris (マリス, Marisu)
Voiced by: Ayasa Itō
Volks (フォルクス, Forukusu)
Voiced by: Hinata Tadokoro

== Media ==
=== Light novels ===
Nikita Kitagawa originally posted the series as a web novel on the online publishing platform Shōsetsuka ni Narō on February 24, 2021, with the most recent chapter being posted on August 30, 2023. It was later picked up for publication by Kodansha, which began publishing it under its Kodansha Ranobe Books imprint, featuring illustrations by Meto Sasame. Two volumes were released between June 2, 2022, and May 2, 2024.

No.	Release date	ISBN
1	June 2, 2022	978-4-06-528229-8
2	May 2, 2024	978-4-06-535453-7

=== Manga ===
A manga adaptation illustrated by Yui Hata began serialization in Kodansha's Magazine Pocket service on June 24, 2022. The first tankōbon volume was released on September 8, 2022; twelve volumes have been released as of July 9, 2026.

The manga's chapters are published in English on Kodansha's K Manga app.

No.	Release date	ISBN
1	September 8, 2022	978-4-06-529216-7
2	December 8, 2022	978-4-06-530175-3
3	March 9, 2023	978-4-06-531313-8
4	June 8, 2023	978-4-06-532012-9
5	September 8, 2023	978-4-06-533449-2
6	December 7, 2023	978-4-06-534026-4
7	March 8, 2024	978-4-06-535078-2
8	September 9, 2024	978-4-06-535952-5
9	December 9, 2024	978-4-06-537638-6
10	May 9, 2025	978-4-06-538898-3
11	December 9, 2025	978-4-06-540766-0
12	July 9, 2026	978-4-06-543916-6

=== Anime ===
An anime television series adaptation was announced in the eleventh volume of the manga adaptation released on December 9, 2025. The series will be produced by Durandal and Tengu Kobou and directed by Haruki Kasugamori, with Hiroshi Hosokawa handling series composition, Hiroshi Miyamoto and Sumakidori designing the characters, and Kyōhei Matsuno composing the music. It is set to premiere in 2027.
