= Oda Cinnamon Nobunaga =

Japanese manga and anime series

- Cover of Oda Cinnamon Nobunaga volume 1 by Tokuma Shoten

織田シナモン信長 (Oda Shinamon Nobunaga)
- Manga
- Written by: Una Megurogawa
- Published by: Tokuma Shoten
- Magazine: Monthly Comic Zenon; Web Comic Zenyon
- Original run: June 2014 – October 20, 2021
- Volumes: 10
- Anime television series
- Directed by: Hidetoshi Takahashi
- Written by: Maruo Kyōzuka
- Music by: Shinji Miyazaki; Hiroshi Nakamura
- Studio: Studio Signpost
- Licensed by: Crunchyroll
- Original network: TV Tokyo, TVA, TVO, AT-X
- Original run: January 10, 2020 – March 27, 2020
- Episodes: 12

Oda Cinnamon Nobunaga (織田シナモン信長, Oda Shinamon Nobunaga) is a Japanese manga series by Una Megurogawa. It has been serialized in Tokuma Shoten's seinen manga magazine Monthly Comic Zenon, as well as the webmagazine Web Comic Zenyon, since June 2014 and has been collected in ten tankōbon volumes. An anime television series adaptation by Studio Signpost premiered from January 10 to March 27, 2020.

== Characters ==
Oda "Cinnamon" Nobunaga (織田シナモン信長)
Voiced by: Kenyu Horiuchi
The former lord of Owari, Nobunaga was betrayed by his subordinate, Akechi Mitsuhide, and, in his final words, would be amused to be reborn as a dog. His wish ends up coming true as he is reborn as a Shiba Inu of the Oda household. He is still vexed at some modern portrayals of him being a literal fool at Honnoji. Because of his former nickname being the "Fool of Owari", he particularly hates the mention of words like "fool", "stupid" or "idiot" as well as fire as it reminds him of Honnōji. He still uses the archaic "de aru" when speaking.
Date "Boo" Masamune (伊達ブー政宗)
Voiced by: Toshio Furukawa
Previously the lord of Oshu, Masamune was reborn as a French Bulldog. In the place of his eyepatch is a large black spot around his right eye, and the crescent on his helmet is now placed right under his neck. His owner is a fan of a male idol group that is named after his various swords and other Date-related groups and media. He is unhappy with Yukimura's flippant behaviour due to modern media portraying both of them as friends and rivals. Out of all the lords, Masamune is the most taken to the modern surroundings, most especially with its entertainment.
Takeda "Lucky" Shingen (武田ラッキー信玄)
Voiced by: Tesshō Genda
A Pomeranian that was formerly the lord of Kai, his fluff tail is something transferred from the fur surrounding his helmet. He often meets his rival, Kenshin, near the Kawanakajima household. He enjoys his life as a dog since his small stature allows him to see under the skirts of women. On occasion, he will often quote the Fūrinkazan.
Uesugi "Julian" Kenshin (上杉ジュリアン謙信)
Voiced by: Tomokazu Sugita
The lord of Echigo and Shingen's rival, Kenshin was reborn as a Borzoi. He often has stare downs with Shingen near the house of the Kawanakajima family. He remains heavily prideful over his legacy with some of his possessions being preserved as cultural treasures. One of his main regrets in his previous life is his sexual abstinence due to his upbringing in a temple. He uses the verbal tic "-zoi" at the end of sentences.
Imagawa "Gilbert" Yoshimoto (今川ギルバート義元)
Voiced by: Takahiro Sakurai
The former lord of Suruga, he was killed by Nobunaga during the Battle of Okehazama and was reborn as a Dachshund. He bears no grudge towards Nobunaga and is rather taken in by the pampered life he gets as a dog. He dislikes his modern portrayals as a bumbling oaf due to his final loss and death.
Kuroda "Charlie" Kanbei (黒田チャーリー官兵衛)
Voiced by: Kazuhiko Inoue
Once one of the most feared strategists of the Warring States period, Kanbei was reincarnated as a Toy Poodle. He remains highly knowledgeable of the events and trends of the modern era but can be rather savvy to the prospect of having these concepts in their era. In the manga, he enjoys watching travel channels and admits that he would've preferred writing about the different foods around the land instead of being a schemer.
Sanada "Marutarō" Yukimura (真田マルタロウ幸村)
Voiced by: Kenichi Suzumura
A Corgi that was formerly Sanada Yukimura, who was known for his defiant resistance during the Siege of Osaka. He enjoys poking fun and teasing the older lords. Happy to be alive compared to the brutal lifestyle he had, he has a bad habit of laughing too much. Masamune noted that Yukimura's personality was much more different in their previous lives, but it changed drastically in the transition to being a dog. In the manga, Yukimura is also a fan of whatever modern media features him and particularly enjoys Sanada Maru.
Ichiko Oda (尾田市子, Oda Ichiko)
Voiced by: Akane Kumada
Owner of Cinnamon, not knowing he is Nobunaga reborn. Her name is a reference to Nobunaga's sister, Oichi. She falls in love with Mitsu at first sight, and mistakes his gazes for her, failing to notice that they are directed to Nobunaga. She is known by her family and friends to be rather gluttonous.
Hideto Mitsu (三津秀人, Mitsu Hideto)
Voiced by: Hiroki Nanami
A veterinary student that is obsessed with Shiba Inus. As a result, he has an unhealthy obsession for Cinnamon. He bears a striking resemblance to Mitsuhide during his past life. Mitsu's nickname is also Mitsuhide, and he is noted for his love of milk, to the point where he does nothing but drink milk exclusively.
Matsunaga "Whip" Hisahide (松永ホイップ久秀)
Voiced by: Ryūsei Nakao
The former lord of Yamato, Hisahide overthrew his previous master, and eventually killed himself by blowing himself up with teapots filled with gunpowder in defiance to Nobunaga. Hisahide was reincarnated as a Chihuahua and is known to constantly shiver and shake uncontrollably. He is a huge fan of rock music, and is a surprisingly good singer despite being otherwise insane. Like Shingen, Hisahide is perverted and uses his petite appearance to gain advantages over girls, leading to competition from Shingen.
Marie "Lily" Antoinette (マリー・リリィ・アントワネット)
Voiced by: Maaya Sakamoto
The former queen of France, in her previous life, she was killed and was reborn as a female Dachshund, who is now married to Yoshimoto. Like Yoshimoto, she is unhappy with her modern portrayals showing her to be more ignorant than she actually is. Yoshimoto notes that Marie has a hot temper and fears bringing up his relationships in the previous life. She often makes references to the famous quote, "Let them eat cake".
Akechi "Lis" Mitsuhide (明智リス光秀)
Voiced by: Miyu Irino
Lis was formerly Mitsuhide, who met his own end shortly after Nobunaga. He finds himself reborn as a chipmunk under the care of Mitsu whom he took a liking to due to the resemblance he has to his past life and love of milk. He fears that Nobunaga still spites him over the betrayal at Honnoji. It is later revealed that Nobunaga's killers only used his bellflower crest, but Mitsuhide himself was not actually a part of the rebellion.
Ota Gyūichi (太田牛一)
Voiced by: Jun Fukuyama
Nobunaga's scribe, who was obsessed with glorifying his lord with all sorts of fictional exploits such as the destruction of Hieiyama, which ironically led to the cruel and demonic perception of the lord. He was first reborn as a cow from the Ota ranch but ended up getting killed, with his meat finding its way to Nobunaga and the other lords. Nobunaga personally described Gyuichi as a stalker in their previous lives. It eventually becomes a running gag for him to be reincarnated as a different animal, only to die once again.
Tokiyoshi "Seira" Honganji (本願寺世良, Honganji "Seira" Tokiyoshi)
Voiced by: Junichi Suwabe
Mitsu's childhood friend, who is often called by the Mitsu family to help out with Mitsuhide's household chores. His name is a reference to the Hongan-ji monks that resisted Nobunaga bitterly during his rise to power, and Nobunaga becomes completely aggressive against Tokiyoshi.
Ichiko's father (市子のパパ)
Voiced by: Yū Mizushima
Ichiko's father who is a businessman who loves playing golf.
Ichiko's mother (市子のママ)
Voiced by: Noriko Hidaka
Toyotomi "Seiya" Hideyoshi (豊臣セイヤ秀吉)
Appearing only in the Manga, known as one of Japan's most brilliant tacticians and considered as Nobunaga's spiritual successor in uniting Japan, Hideyoshi was reincarnated as a Bull Terrier, and remains incredibly devout to Nobunaga. Hideyoshi's demeanor changes in contrast to an intimidating and unnerving figure to both Yukimura and Masamune, both of whom served as his vassals previously. In spite of his outer appearance, Hideyoshi is a deceptively skilled and perceptive liar. While he rushed to kill Mitsuhide after Honnōji, he was saddened to learn only after that Mitsuhide was not the true mastermind of the rebellion.
Asakura "Pudding" Sōteki (朝倉プリン宗滴)
A manga-only character. The former lord of Echizen, Sōteki was famed for his warmongering, eventually dying in a blaze of glory during his final battle at an elderly age. Despite his reincarnation as a Yorkshire Terrier, Sōteki remains obsessed with the battlefield and the archaic system of honor and discipline, much to the bewilderment of the other reincarnated lords.
Mōri "Justin" Motonari (毛利ジャスティン元就)
A manga-exclusive character. A Border Collie that was conqueror of the Chūgoku region, Motonari and his sons, Takakage, Motoharu, and Terumoto, now work as rescue dogs for a lake's pedal boat ride. Motonari is still bitter over his clan's defeat at the second battle of Kizugawaguchi and can be a sore loser that refuses to let go of his previous life.
Maeda "Pel" Toshiie (前田ペル利家)
A manga-exclusive character. One of Nobunaga's most loyal and devoted commanders, Toshiie had once become a rival with Hideyoshi for Nobunaga's attention much to the latter's annoyance. Believing he was reincarnated as a Siberian Husky due to his childhood name, Inuchiyo, containing the word Inu (犬 "dog"), Toshiie is happy to be reunited with both Hideyoshi and Nobunaga once more. Similar to Yoshimoto, Toshiie lives a highly pampered life with his owner having multiple properties across Japan, but he only stays in the area during colder seasons.
Sen no Rikyū (千利休)
A manga-only character, Rikyū was a famed tea master valued by both Nobunaga and Hideyoshi. The lords, in hindsight, believe that Rikyū was too fond of the color black in making his teapots, something that Nobunaga felt was bland when compared to western teaware. Both Mitsuhide and Hideyoshi reveal that Rikyū was the true culprit behind the Honnō-ji Incident. Rikyū has since been reincarnated as a crow and has now become addicted to Cola.

== Media ==
=== Manga ===
No.	Release date	ISBN
1	December 19, 2015	978-4199803192
Chapters 1-14
2	September 20, 2016	978-4199803673
Chapters 15-29
3	April 20, 2017	978-4199804052
Chapters 30-43
4	October 20, 2017	978-4199804533
Chapters 44-58
5	August 20, 2018	978-4199805110
Chapters 59-71
6	July 20, 2019	978-4199805851
Chapters 72-82
7	December 20, 2019	978-4199806094
Chapters 83-94
8	March 18, 2020	978-4867201770
Chapters 95-103
9	December 19, 2020	978-4867202036
Chapters 104-113
10	October 20, 2021	978-4867202753
Chapters 114-123

=== Anime ===
An anime television series adaptation was announced on the sixth volume of the manga on July 19, 2019. The series is animated by Studio Signpost and directed by Hidetoshi Takahashi, with Maruo Kyōzuka handling series composition, and Hisashi Kagawa designing the characters. It premiered from January 10 to March 27, 2020, on TV Tokyo, TVO, and TVA. Akane Kumada performed the series' opening theme song "Sunny Sunny Girl◎", while Kenyu Horiuchi, Toshio Furukawa, and Tesshō Genda performed the series' ending theme song "Cinnamon-tachi". Crunchyroll is streaming the series. It ran for 12 episodes.

No.	Title	Original release date
1	"Man From the Past: I Am Oda Cinnamon Nobunaga!?"; Transliteration: "Jikū wo koete yomigaetta kan: Washi ga Oda Shinamon Nobunaga de aru!?" (Japanese: 時空を越えて蘇った漢 ワシが織田シナモン信長である！？)	January 10, 2020
On June, 1532, Nobunaga is betrayed by the forces of Akechi Mitsuhide, and he eventually holds out momentarily before being slain by the rebels. He soon finds himself reborn as a Shiba Inu named "Cinnamon", and his owner soon takes him to the dog park, where he still asserts his previous life as Nobunaga. To his surprise, he meets Takeda Shingen, Uesugi Kenshin, Imagawa Yoshimoto, Date Masamune and Kuroda Kanbei, all former personas of the same time period. Later, he watches another drama of himself being killed once again at Honnoji. He takes this to the other lords and they theorize that someone other than Mitsuhide could've been the true leader of the rebellion, as well as criticize him for keeping his grudge even though Yoshimoto, who was killed by Nobunaga, had none. The group is then approached by a man that looks similar to Mitsuhide.
2	"Milkman and Strawberry Panties...Love at Honnouji!?"; Transliteration: "Gyūnyū man to ichigo panti...Honnōji no Koi!?" (Japanese: 牛乳マンとイチゴパンティ・・・本能寺の恋！？)	January 17, 2020
The man is revealed to be Hideto Mitsu, and he proceeds to grab and hug Nobunaga tightly, leading the other lords to think that Mitsuhide killed Nobunaga so that they would romantically die together. The next day, Ichiko's friend, Tomo, arrives to make emergency preparations for a concert, which Nobunaga mistakes for modern warfare. While on a walk, he spots both Shingen and Kenshin in a confrontation near a house with the Kawanakajima name, only for the two to carry on with their respective walks. Nobunaga then looks back at how he had to be cautious around the two during their battles, and still fears Kenshin's larger size as a Borzoi. The following day, Nobunaga finds Tomo and Ichiko playing a game with humanized versions of his swords who proceed to insult him repeatedly.
3	"Canine Lords, and Battle of Okehazama Returns?"; Transliteration: "Inu kizoku, Okehazama no Tatakai futatabi...de aru ka?" (Japanese: 犬貴族、桶狭間の戦い再び・・・であるか？)	January 24, 2020
Ichiko heads out for another walk with Tomo and Nobunaga and begin talking about putting clothes on Nobunaga before leaving him with Tomo. Later Nobunaga meets Yoshimoto and attempts to apologize for killing him at Okehazama, but Yoshimoto is happy with his life of luxury as a dog and proceeds to leave with his new wife, Lily. Ichiko returns with a new outfit for Nobunaga, only for it to be revealed to only be a monkey hat. The next day, Nobunaga returns to the dog park to eat meat with the other lords, and immediately urinates due to the thought of fire, which the lords believe to be punishment for him massacring the monks at Hieiyama. To their surprise, Nobunaga denies committing the act and believes it to be one of his scribe, Ohta Gyuichi's, overzealous work. The spirit of Gyuichi soon arrives, revealing that he had been reincarnated as the cow whose meat the dogs are eating; but Nobunaga immediately denies the possibility and continues eating, causing the spirit of Gyuichi to disappear. Lily and Yoshimoto then complain at modern day portrayals of them being fools primarily, with her taking personal offense against the propaganda of her during her time. Due to their lovey dovey relationship annoying the others, the other lords decide to spread rumors about the two.
4	"Rain Is the Melody of War ～It Always Starts With Rain～"; Transliteration: "Ameon wa tatakai no Shirabe ～Hajimari wa itsumo ame～" (Japanese: 雨音は戦いの調べ～始まりはいつも雨～)	January 31, 2020
Due to the rain, Nobunaga is denied a walk and becomes highly gaseous because of this. Eventually, Ichiko does take him out on a rain cover, only for him to fart and get knocked out by the stench as the gas is trapped within the cover. The next day, the lords begin talking about Sanada Yukimura, who was recently reincarnated as a dog as well. To Masamune's horror, Yukimura goes on to insult all three lords as well as turning into someone incredibly childish and rude in the transition. The next day, Shingen begins using his small size and cute appearance to see under a woman's skirt as well as to ogle her bust, only to be interrupted by Nobunaga and Kenshin. Shingen attempts to defend himself by citing a woman's panty as their individuality and attempts to check to underwear of another woman only to be shocked and describing the image simply as "a katana in the place of a throne". Ichiko and Tomo later visit Ai, the owner of Masamune as well as their classmate, and, to Nobunaga's bewilderment, find her to be an obsessive fan of the Kentou Enbu, a male idol group based around Masamune's swords. The next day the other lords talk about Yukimura again, with them thinking less of him due to lower birth, with the exception of Masamune, who is aware of Yukimura's exploits. Later that day, Mitsu leaves Ichiko due to a call from Seira, leading to her wondering who Seira could be.
5	"Falconry! Golf!! Old Dude Activities of Fire!!"; Transliteration: "Taka kari! Gorufu!! Honō no Ossan gyōji!!" (Japanese: 鷹狩り！ゴルフ！！炎のオッサン行事！！)	February 7, 2020
Due to the dry and monotonous nature of kibbles, Nobunaga begins comparing his food to the food that the ninjas used, Hyorogan. He brings this up the next day with the other lords as they compare their versions of the snack, but note that the many versions look and likely taste the same. The next day he listens over to one of Ichiko's upperclassmen talking badly about Tomo because the upperclassman's crush is interested on Tomo, but Ichiko skillfully defuses the entire situation, leading Nobunaga to see it as advanced military tactics. The next night, Nobunaga listens to Ichiko's father gush over the beauty of golf, which Nobunaga sees as the modern day equivalent to falconry, which he often enjoyed with Ieyasu. The next day, the lords begin talking about their previous wives and concubines. Shingen notes of his beautiful wife being incredibly frightening. Yoshimoto is unable to say anything for fear of Lily's jealous rage. Both Yukimura and Masamune take more pride over having multiple wives and concubines rather than a single one. Kenshin never had a spouse due to his previous prayer to abstain from sexual activity in exchange for success in battle. To everyone's surprise, Nobunaga takes pride in his marriage with Nōhime in spite of having many children under other concubines, considering no one else but her as his wife. Later that night, Ichiko meets Mitsu and Seira, who is revealed to be a man. As soon as Seira introduces himself with the last name Honganji, Nobunaga immediately becomes angry due to the Honganji monks that fought him only to be taken down by Tomo's massage. Although Ichiko is relieved to find Seira to be a man, Ai immediately imagines both Mitsu and Seira to still be in an intimate relationship with each other.
6	"Rock n' Roll!!! Adorable ♥ Most Evil Man Appears!?"; Transliteration: "Rokkudaze!!! Kawaīi ♥ saikyō no Kan genru!?" (Japanese: ロックだぜ！！！かわいい♥最凶の漢現る！？)	February 14, 2020
Mitsuhide is woken on one faithful night by one of his retainers, who is reporting of a massive rebellion against Nobunaga at Honnoji. Once Mitsuhide asks who the ringleader is, he is shocked to learn that he has been framed for Nobunaga's death. Back in the modern world, Mitsu is unable to wake up on time, so Mitsuhide stuffs his owner's nostrils with acorns to wake him up. At the dog park, Masamune, Yukimura and Nobunaga all meet Matsunaga Hisahide, another lord of their era. Despite making fun of his new appearance as a Chihuahua and insane devotion to rock music, Hisahide is able to bring Yukimura and Masamune to tears with his singing ability. The next day, a pair of cosplayers arrive near the park, and Shingen attempts to dive them, only for it to be revealed that Hisahide had already been enjoying their attention. On the news later, historians display one of Nobunaga's old letters, and the other Sengoku figures point out the hypocrisy of modern media valuing privacy even though they publicly reveal and read personal letters from the lords. In Mitsu's apartment, Gyuichi returns, now reincarnated as a stinkbug. He is immediately trapped within one of the empty milk bottles by Mitsuhide, who begins scolding Gyuichi for his over-exaggerated works causing Nobunaga's harsh reputation. Gyuichi then dies from being forced to smell his own stench for too long. Mitsuhide later expresses his relief that his lord is still well and good but wonders when he will have the opportunity to clear his own name.
7	"I Want to Protect Peace on Earth...From the Dog Park With Love?"; Transliteration: "Chikyū no Heiwa wo mamoritai...Dogguran yori ai wo komete?" (Japanese: 地球の平和を守りたい・・・ドッグランより愛を込めて？)	February 21, 2020
Masamune and Ai watch a superhero movie, leading to Masamune considering his destiny not to unite Japan, but to unite the world, which is only laughed at by Yukimura and Nobunaga for its cliché nature. When Masamune considers starting a superhero ranger group with the other two, they laugh even harder at the tackiness of Masamune's naming abilities. Gyuichi returns for a third time, now reincarnated as an ant. By chance, a gust of wind blows him on top of Nobunaga's nose, leading to him accidentally eating Gyuichi. The next day, Ichiko and her mother leave Nobunaga alone in the house for an outing, and he decides to experiment with the house's toilet, where he finds and plays with the bidet. During a get-together between Ichiko, Tomo and Ai, Nobunaga shows off figures of himself made by Ichiko to Masamune, but the two are eventually creeped out by Ai's BL manga featuring both Masamune and Yukimura. Meanwhile, in Mitsu's house, Mitsu is ogling photos of Nobunaga, to the point of even cutting out a picture of himself and gluing it into one of Nobunaga's photos as well as wishing to reincarnated as a dog, much to Mitsuhide's disgust. The next day, Nobunaga and the other lords discuss the recent popularity of second sons, a stark contrast to their era, where the second borns were almost never the ones to inherit their parents' legacy. Nobunaga was previously able to abuse this and ended up forming the aptly-named Great Second-Sons-And-Younger army. The next day, the dogs are taken to the park for rabies vaccination, and Nobunaga and Masamune immediately attempt to flee especially after Shingen claiming to have more fear of the needle than any of his previous battles. As Yukimura held no fear, Masamune and Nobunaga are pressured to go. While Masamune's injection is quick, as Nobunaga had caused a ruckus the previous year, Ichiko holds him down before the veterinarian injects Nobunaga through the rear, causing more pain than Masamune's injection.
8	"Gourmet Battle!? I'm Not Compromising on This Flavor!!!"; Transliteration: "Gurume taiketsu!? Yuzurenai aji ga andayo!!!" (Japanese: グルメ対決！？譲れない味があんだよ！！！)	February 28, 2020
Nobunaga brings over his previous thoughts on his palette to the other lords, leading to both Shingen and Masamune claiming to be the gourmets of their era. Unfortunately, both lay claim to the invention of frozen tofu, leading to a full brawl. The next night, Nobunaga and Ichiko take a walk after watching a horror movie and are frightened by Mitsu, who went out for groceries. Ichiko and Mitsu later joke about the ghosts of Sengoku figures appearing, much to Nobunaga's exasperation. The group is then frightened by the sudden appearance of a small turtle. The next day, Nobunaga runs into Masamune, still asserting his claim. While peeing on a pole, Shingen arrives and declares that the pole already belonged to him, which leads to another brawl between him and Masamune. During the next gathering, the lords begin discussing other fictional events of their period and they bring up Kenshin sending Shingen some salt after his territory is cut from the sea. Shingen immediately retorts he never received such a gift, and Kenshin confirms that he did absolutely nothing to help Shingen in his crisis. He later says that he enjoyed seeing the Takeda, Imagawa and Hōjō families fight each other so that he wouldn't have to fight annoying battles at Kawanakajima, shocking Shingen who took honor in their skirmishes. While tied to a pole, Nobunaga meets a depressed worker who recently disappointed his boss and senior, although the senior calls his junior to tell him that everything is fine; the worker expresses envy at having a dog's life, much to Nobunaga's shock as he tries to warn the man not to jinx himself. Masamune and Shingen later fight again, but about their versions of sweets, with Shingen claiming that his Shingenmochi was named after him specifically while Masamune's Datemaki was only after his family. Ichiko and the other owners later note how well both Shingen and Masamune get along with each other.
9	"Warm Up in a Kotatsu ♪ General Frost of the Warring States"; Transliteration: "Kotatsu de hok kori ♪ Gokkan ettō kogarashi fuyushōgun" (Japanese: コタツでほっこり♪極寒越冬木枯らし冬将軍)	March 6, 2020
Winter soon arrives, and Nobunaga is moved indoors as a result. Thankful for the inventions of the heater, air conditioner and kotatsu, Nobunaga imagines what would've happened if he had them in the past, but realized it would cause everyone to become too lazy to work. He notes their old way around winters was through alcohol, but his troops would often drink too much and there were times they'd end up being too drunk to properly fight. The next day, Seira, Ai, Tomo and Mitsu all visit to cook some sweet potatoes outdoors, but Nobunaga's fear of fire causes him to panic until he's finally fed some sweet potatoes. Days later, Tomo and Ai notice that both Ichiko and Nobunaga have now gotten fat due to the lack of exercise, but the pair are able to lose all the extra weight in a few minutes. The next day, Ichiko's mother brings out some old teawares, much to Nobunaga's delight and interest. He imagines that had he received these in the past, he never would've forgiven Hisahide's betrayal and would've simply executed him outright. Due to his enthusiasm, Ichiko's mother gives Nobunaga a saucer instead. During the next gathering between Nobunaga, Masamune and Shingen, the three talk about their parenting, where Shingen claims to have taught Katsuyori intensively, but Nobunaga debunks this as he defeated and killed Katsuyori and destroyed the Takeda. Shingen and Masamune then take jabs over Nobunaga's inability to name his own children as well as giving them incredibly stupid names, something his concubines scolded him for.
10	"Can't Wait for Summer!! Great Battle in a Dress and a Loincloth!!!"; Transliteration: "Machikirenakute natsu!! Wanpi to fundoshi de iza jinjō ni shōbu!!!" (Japanese: 待ちきれなくて・・・夏！！ワンピと褌でいざ尋常に勝負！！！)	March 13, 2020
Ichiko, Tomo and Ai all visit the department store for pet-related goods. As they are small dogs, they are allowed to stay within the grocery basket, but Kenshin is too big and is left behind in the car. While moving, they run into Seira and Mitsu. Later on, Ichiko gets lost after being distracted by a snack sale. While searching for the others, Nobunaga runs into Shingen, who received a groom in the nearby salon. Nobunaga then blunts Shingen's attempt to peek under Ichiko's skirt. Shingen later brags that his stylist was a young and busty woman, whose breasts were fondled by him repeatedly throughout. Meanwhile, Kenshin is found by Yukimura and his owner, the former being too tired after attempting to greet and introduce himself to everyone. Later, Kanbei arrives, having lost most of his fur to the stylist, which Shingen and Nobunaga remark is more akin to a bikini. While the pair attempt to comfort him with the female trimmer, Kanbei notes he didn't get the stylist, instead getting her superior, a large and muscular man. As the two begin laughing again as soon as Kanbei departs, Kanbei gives them a frightening glare, forcing out an apology from Nobunaga and Shingen. The next day, both Tomo and Ichiko visit Ai's room, which is surprisingly normal. Ai, however, reveals all her hidden pictures and objects worshipping Masamune. While Masamune calls this a ninja shrine, Nobunaga believes Ai to be more of cult member instead. While Ichiko is trying on a summer dress, Nobunaga notices the neckline's tassel and compares it to the same ends of a fundoshi. When the other lords wonder what the correlation is, Nobunaga simply worries that Ichiko may have the urge to relieve herself during a date much to the shock of the distraught lords. As Ichiko and Nobunaga are leaving, they decide to visit a petting event. Nobunaga then finds a pony, which he is shocked to learn is actually one of the smaller breeds of horses; pointing out that horses of his era were better being stouter due to the more mountainous terrain for fighting and lack of flat plains in battle. When Ichiko and Nobunaga visit the alpacas, one of them spits on Nobunaga's face.
11	"Burn! Life and Social Media!!!"; Transliteration: "Moero! Jinsei to SNS!!!" (Japanese: 燃えろ！人生とSNS！！！)	March 20, 2020
While in the dog park, the lords notice that their owners have been more focused with their social media accounts as of late. Everyone except Kanbei are all welcoming to the idea of using it, though mostly through having selfies of their travels and communication. Kanbei, however, believes that if they had such a thing, important military and political documents may end up getting leaked to others as well as doing stupider things just to gain fame. Among the lords, however, Nobunaga would be the worst as Kanbei would believe that he would get caught up in all the different flame wars. Ichiko later recounts an all old story between her parents to Tomo and Ai. While having dinner, Ichiko's father only sees a lightly seasoned fried chicken, which he wishes had more sauce. This statement, however, was right in the face of Ichiko's mother, who becomes angry, much to Nobunaga's horror. The two later make up after Nobunaga plays around to lighten the mood. Nobunaga later points out he had learned from experience thanks to having to deal with his own spouse. He soon ends up crying at the stress that he had when he had to also take care of all of his concubines as well. Nobunaga turns on the television in order to watch his favorite sumo program. During the final rounds of a championship, however, Ichiko changes the channel. By the time she changes the channel back, the match is already over. Ichiko then washes the yaoi drama recommended Ai recommended. As the show goes on, Ichiko later expresses her disdain for the possibility of Mitsu and Seira being lovers, frightening Nobunaga. Mitsuhide accompanies Mitsu during his next outing, now running into Nobunaga once again. As a squirrel, Mitsuhide happily caresses and messes around with Nobuanga (much to Mitsu's distress), something he never allowed himself to do in the previous life. Gyuichi then returns, now reborn as a pigeon. Mitsuhide, however, warns Gyuichi to not get so excited as he has already died thrice in quick manner. When Gyuichi admits having chest pains recently, Mitsuhide offers to check his pulse and heart, but Gyuichi immediately rejects the idea and flies off. The overexcited Gyuichi then suffers a heart attack and crashes into the water, where he dies again. As spring has returned Nobunaga begins searching for his doghouse, only for Ichiko's mother to reveal that she threw it away during the winter. Nobunaga soon becomes depressed as he sees that doghouses are the new equivalent to his previous castles. Ichiko and Ichiko's mother later set up a tent for Nobunaga's new doghouse, much to his horror.
12	"Puppies of War"; Transliteration: "Ikusa no Koinu" (Japanese: いくさの子犬)	March 27, 2020
Mitsu recently wins a trip to Odawara Castle as part of a raffle prize, and decides to take Seiran, and Ichiko and friends with him. When Nobunaga brings Odawara up to the warlords, both Shingen and Kenshin recount their ill-fated sieges while Yukimura comments that it served as his first battle. Shingen argues having watched a documentary claiming that Yukimura's first battle was actually at Ueda Castle only for Yukimura to comment that many alternate theories exist. Later on, Mitsu and co finally begin riding, but it turns out that Seira, the only one who has a driver's license, hasn't driven for years. After fumbling with the car's controls, he begins moving at a turtle's pace, and Mitsu later suffers from carsickness (which he lied about conquering). Once Mitsu apologizes for his lie and is placated by being able to hold Nobunaga for the ride to Odawara, Masamune and Ai talk about his historical submission to Hideyoshi, where he arrived in funeral wear to pledge allegiance. Once the group finally reach Odawara, Masamune, Nobunaga, and Mitsuhide all race towards the former camp site of Hideyoshi, where Masamune claims to have buried treasure on that fateful day. To Mitsuhide and Nobunaga's shock, the "treasure" only turns out to be a taunting challenge that Masamune wrote on the ground before it was buried. Nobunaga and Ichiko return home after their trip, but Nobunaga falls ill in the stomach following stress from having to deal with Mitsu and Masamune. Ichiko would take Nobunaga to the vet, who advises them to let him fast for a few days before injecting Nobunaga with a supplement to help over the treatment. A stressed out Nobunaga falls asleep and recounts his initial shock when first reincarnated as a puppy. Often pushed around in his litter of four, Nobunaga saw his siblings as rivals and aggressively sucked his mother's fullest nipple and kept his siblings off their food. Even the pet store staff were not able to get him adopted, but Ichiko's family was not intimidated by Nobunaga's display and eventually won him over as a dog. Once he wakes up, a recovered Nobunaga pesters Ichiko for a walk, who is relieved to see him better. As the show closes, Nobunaga finally accepts his new life as Ichiko's dog.

== Reception ==
Anime News Network had four editors review the first episode of the anime: James Beckett was initially on board with the show's concept but felt the jokes were too obvious and catered only to Japanese history aficionados, and its use of "noticeably cheap artwork and corny vocal performances" made it feel like a short-form series but is instead an "achingly repetitive" full-length one; Theron Martin commended the use of Nobunaga and other Sengoku-era figures as reincarnated canines through good "artistic effort" and decently comedic scenarios; Nick Creamer was critical of the show's overarching joke being stretched throughout its runtime and having "no real aesthetic strengths" to distinguish itself, concluding that: "If you've seen the trailer, you've seen the entire show; feel free to skip this one." The fourth reviewer, Rebecca Silverman, saw promise in the overall concept with its juxtaposition of dogs having elderly voices and side-by-side comparisons with their human forms, but felt it lacked enough "humor power" to justify its full-length running time.
