= Rifle Is Beautiful =

Japanese manga and anime series

- Cover of Rifle Is Beautiful volume 1 by Shueisha

ライフル・イズ・ビューティフル (Raifuru Izu Byūtifuru)
- Genre: Comedy; Slice of life; Sports (Shooting)
- Manga
- Written by: Salmiakki
- Published by: Shueisha
- Magazine: Tonari no Young Jump
- Original run: April 9, 2015 – July 2, 2020
- Volumes: 6
- Anime television series

Chidori RSC
- Directed by: Masanori Takahashi
- Written by: Tatsuya Takahashi
- Music by: Satoshi Hono
- Studio: Studio 3Hz
- Licensed by: NA: Sentai Filmworks (Note: Home video rights through Section23 Films and streaming rights via Hidive in selected regions.); UK: MVM Films; DE: Anime House; EU/LATAM: Crunchyroll (Note: Streaming rights in Latin America and Europe.)
- Original network: Tokyo MX, SUN, KBS, BS11
- Original run: October 13, 2019 – January 18, 2020
- Episodes: 12
- icon

Rifle Is Beautiful (ライフル・イズ・ビューティフル, Raifuru Izu Byūtifuru), also known as Chidori RSC, is a Japanese shooting sport four-panel manga series by Salmiakki. It was serialized online via Shueisha's Tonari no Young Jump website from April 2015 to July 2020, and was collected in six tankōbon volumes. It follows a young incoming high school student who is excited to join her school's shooting club, which was shut down, only for her attempts to revive it.

An anime television series adaptation by studio 3Hz aired from October 2019 to January 2020.

== Plot ==
Hikari Kokura, a passionate marksman, enrolls at Chidori High School, which has a target shooting club, but discovers the club was dissolved due to a lack of members. She restarts the club by finding three new members to join her, with the goal of making it into a national competition.

== Characters ==
=== Chidori High School ===
Hikari Kokura (小倉ひかり, Kokura Hikari)
Voiced by: Machico (Japanese); Brittney Karbowski (English)
A member of the Chidori High School Rifle Shooting Club. She enrolled herself at Chidori High School solely because of its Rifle Shooting Club. Hikari has a carefree and cheerful spirit although she is capable of doing everything to reach her goals when she is motivated. She is constantly trying to improve her shooting skills to fulfil her dreams of entering the Olympics.
Izumi Shibusawa (渋沢泉水, Shibusawa Izumi)
Voiced by: Akane Kumada (Japanese); Juliet Simmons (English)
A member of the Chidori High School Rifle Shooting Club and the childhood friend of Hikari Kokura. She is a gentle and supportive friend who loves reading. She is also to be a good cook as Hikari uses her treats as motivation when she is feeling tired during shooting practice. She is described by Hikari as super level headed and totally dependable.
Erika Meinohama (姪浜エリカ, Meinohama Erika)
Voiced by: Saki Minami (Japanese); Patricia Duran (English)
A member of the Chidori High School Rifle Shooting Club. She is a skilled rifle shooter. She is a graceful and popular girl who easily leads the club, even though Hikari Kokura was the one who re-founded it. She also is rather vain as she often relishes in her own beauty and skills.
Yukio Igarashi (五十嵐雪緒, Igarashi Yukio)
Voiced by: Anna Yamaki (Japanese); Genevieve Simmons (English)
A member of the Chidori High School Rifle Shooting Club. She is not expressive and is usually poker-faced. However, she does appear to be very charming when she does show emotions. It is said that watching her shoot is similar to watching precision machinery as her shots are always accurate and on point.
Yūko Tsurumaki (鶴巻裕子, Tsurumaki Yūko)
Voiced by: Yukiyo Fujii (Japanese); Avery Smithhart (English)
A teacher at Chidori High School and the advisor for the Rifle Shooting Club.

=== Asaka Academy ===
Akira Shinonome (東雲あきら, Shinonome Akira)
Voiced by: Natsumi Fujiwara (Japanese); Alyssa Simmons (English)
The president of the Asaka Academy Rifle Shooting Club and Erika's cousin. Erika contacted her to arrange a practice match to prepare for the High School Rifle Shooting Competition.
Misa Kuroi (黒井ミサ, Kuroi Misa)
Voiced by: Reina Ueda (Japanese); Maggie Flecknoe (English)
The vice president of the Asaka Academy Rifle Shooting Club.
Karen Sakashita (坂下花恋, Sakashita Karen)
Voiced by: Minami Takahashi (Japanese); Christina Kelly (English)
A first-year student at Asaka Academy and a member of the academy's Rifle Shooting Club. She shows commitment to practising and speaks well of others when observing them. She is polite and courteous.
Ryōko Mochizuki (望月涼子, Mochizuki Ryōko)
Voiced by: Manaka Iwami (Japanese); Natalie Rial (English)
A first-year student who is seen with Karen Sakashita during practice at Asaka Academy Rifle Shooting Club.

=== Other characters ===
Rei Asakura (朝倉零, Asakura Rei)
Voiced by: M.A.O (Japanese); Olivia Swasey (English)
The president of Kiritani First High School Rifle Shooting club.
Marina Tsuji (辻まりな, Tsuji Marina)
Voiced by: Azusa Tadokoro (Japanese); Melissa Molano (English)
One of Hikari's classmates. They have lunch and talk with each other quite often.
Ako Tōma (当麻あこ, Tōma Ako)
Voiced by: Hiyori Kono (Japanese); Heidi Hinkle (English)
One of Hikari's classmates. They have lunch and talk with each other quite often. She is a member of the Tracking Club.
Nodoka Ogura (小倉のどか, Ogura Nodoka)
Voiced by: Kaori Nazuka (Japanese); Joanne Bonasso (English)
One of the teachers in Chidori High School.

== Media ==
=== Manga ===
Rifle Is Beautiful, written and illustrated by Salmiakki, began on Shueisha's Tonari no Young Jump website on April 9, 2015, and it ended on July 2, 2020. Shueisha has compiled and published its chapters into six individual tankōbon volumes from May 19, 2016, to September 18, 2020.

==== Volume list ====
No.	Release date	ISBN
1	May 19, 2016	978-4-08-890357-6
2	December 19, 2016	978-4-08-890509-9
3	September 19, 2017	978-4-08-890745-1
4	October 19, 2018	978-4-08-891143-4
5	September 19, 2019	978-4-08-891362-9
6	September 18, 2020	978-4-08-891701-6

=== Anime ===
An anime adaptation was announced in the 46th issue of Weekly Young Jump magazine on October 18, 2018. The series was animated by studio 3Hz and directed by Masanori Takahashi, with Tatsuya Takahashi handling series composition, and Ken Mukaigawara designing the characters. It aired from October 13, 2019, to January 18, 2020, on Tokyo MX, SUN, KBS, and BS11. The series' opening theme song is "Let's go! Rifling 4!!!!" (Let's go!ライフリング4!!!!), while the series' ending theme song is "Yūyake Friends" (夕焼けフレンズ), both performed by Rifling 4 (a group consisting of Machico, Akane Kumada, Saki Minami, and Anna Yamaki). The series ran for 12 episodes.

==== International release and distribution ====
Chidori RSC is licensed in North America through Sentai Filmworks and streamed on its Hidive platform. An English dub starring Brittney Karbowski and Juliet Simmons premiered on Hidive on December 28, 2020, with the Blu-ray released via Section23 Films on December 15, 2020. In the United Kingdom, MVM Films licensed the series and was released on Blu-ray on April 12, 2021. Anime House has licensed the series in Germany.

==== Episode list ====
No.	Title (Note: All English titles are taken from Hidive.)	Original release date
1	"What Are Beam Rifles?"; Transliteration: "Howatto・Izu・Bīmu" (Japanese: ホワット・イズ・ビーム)	October 13, 2019
Hikari Kokura enrolls at Chidori High School, keen to join the Chidori Rifle Shooting Club (RSC). Twenty minutes later, Hikari and her childhood friend Izumi Shibusawa both learn that the Chidori RSC was recently shut down. Hikari and Izumi set out to recruit Erika Meinohama, whom Izumi recognized during the opening ceremony, while Yukio Igarashi approaches them after discovering Hikari's lost club application form and agrees to join as well. With the Chidori RSC successfully reinstated one week later, Hikari, Izumi, Erika and Yukio begin their daily lives of target practice in the shooting range using beam rifles, which shoot lasers instead of bullets. The popular yet vain Erika is half-Japanese and half-Russian, while the emotionless yet charming Yukio has incredibly accurate aim. Beam rifles use xenon arc lamps to create light, and a shooting coat is worn for a more stable shooting stance. The four share a picnic outside before they visit Erika's house, where Erika lends Hikari a pink shooting coat. After buying snacks at the grocery store, the four commemorate their first outing together. They discuss how they did during their entrance exams before Hikari ends the night with a bunny joke.
2	"Club Is Funny"; Transliteration: "Bukatsu・Izu・Fanī" (Japanese: 部活・イズ・ファニー)	October 20, 2019
At the shooting range, Erika explains the rules for a practice match to improve shooting accuracy, in which the Chidori RSC will fire 60 shots for a maximum score of 654 points in 45 minutes. With the shooting target ten meters away and the bullseye one millimeter in diameter, the practice match is underway as Hikari, Izumi, Erika and Yukio carefully take their time with each shot while enduring the spring heat. Hikari fails quite miserably, worsened by the fact that she sneezed during her final shot. When the practice match is over, Hikari, Izumi, Erika and Yukio discuss how they train at home. As Hikari and Izumi walk home, Izumi reminds Hikari about the midterms. The next day, Hikari ends up failing her midterms, but manages to pass the makeup midterms after Izumi tutors her. During physical education class, Hikari struggles to catch a softball thrown by Izumi, while Erika pitches a riseball and causes Yukio to strikeout. After Izumi shares her apple pie with Hikari, Erika mentions the upcoming regional qualifiers in the summer. As Yukio believes that this would be an opportunity for them, Erika agrees to pull some strings for a real practice match.
3	"Our Competitors Are Powerful"; Transliteration: "Taisen Aite・Izu・Kyougou" (Japanese: 対戦相手・イズ・強豪)	October 27, 2019
Erika arranges for the Chidori RSC to have a practice match with the Asaka RSC, of which its members were placed second in last year's nationals. Hikari, Izumi, Erika and Yukio wake up early on a Saturday, traveling by train to Asaka Academy, where they meet club president Akira Shinonome and club vice president Misa Kuroi, while freshman club members Karen Sakashita and Ryōko Mochizuki gossip about the Chidori RSC. It is also revealed that Akira is Erika's cousin. As the practice match begins, Hikari, Izumi and Erika watch as Yukio is first on the lineup. While Erika and Akira exchange friendly banter, Yukio does really well on her round. As Hikari and Izumi are next on the lineup, Hikari surprisingly does fairly well on her round despite her rocky start. While Erika is last on the lineup, Karen tells Hikari that Akira competed in last year's nationals. The practice match comes to a close as Akira placed second while Karen placed twenty-third. As the Chidori RSC take their leave, Yukio placed first, Erika placed fourth, Izumi placed twelfth and Hikari placed twenty-first.
4	"Our Advisor Is a Beginner"; Transliteration: "Komon・Izu・Biginaa" (Japanese: 顧問・イズ・ビギナー)	November 3, 2019
On a Sunday, Hikari decides to sleep in, while Yukio chases a black cat inside a subway. Erika briefly receives an unexpected visit from Akira. Hikari and Izumi eat shabu-shabu for dinner. The next day, Hikari's classmates Marina Tsuji and Ako Tōma watch Hikari, Izumi, Erika and Yukio while they train in the shooting range, though Marina and Ako end up taking an early leave. Hikari later realizes that the Chidori RSC cannot compete in the regional qualifiers without a club advisor. A teacher named Yūko Tsurumaki, who knows nothing about beam rifles, musters the courage to become the club advisor for the Chidori RSC and creates a misleading promotional poster on their behalf. Yūko later invites Hikari, Izumi, Erika and Yukio to her apartment, where she has hoarded a lot of anime and manga memorabilia. After the apartment is spruced up, Hikari, Izumi, Erika and Yukio give Yūko a collection of magazines about the world of rifle shooting, noting that they must beat the Asaka RSC, the Iseoka RSC and the Kiritani First RSC in order to make it to the nationals.
5	"Qualifiers Are Exciting"; Transliteration: "Yosen・Izu・Ekisaitingu" (Japanese: 予選・イズ・エキサイティング)	November 10, 2019
Hikari, Izumi, Erika and Yukio make preparations for the upcoming regional qualifiers. Yūko drives them in a rented minivan to the venue held in the gymnasium at Iseoka High School, where the Chidori RSC, the Asaka RSC, the Iseoka RSC and the Kiritani First RSC will all be competing. The Iseoka RSC is composed of club president Kozakura Konno, junior club member Haruna Tani and junior club member Chiyo Sato, while the Kiritani First RSC is composed of sophomore club member Ushio Sanada, sophomore club member Komachi Enomoto and club president Rei Asakura. Izumi, Erika and Yukio are taken by surprise when Hikari has consistent aim, sparking jealousy from Misa. Yūko realizes that Hikari's lower body is steady, hence the reason for Hikari doing so well this time, despite making one crucial mistake six shots before she finishes the first round. According to the temporary rankings, Misa, Hikari and Chiyo are respectively placed in the top three. With Yukio among the participants in the second round, Komachi says some fighting words that really ignites a rivalry between them.
6	"Our Target Is Nationals"; Transliteration: "Taagetto・Izu・Zenkoku Taikai" (Japanese: ターゲット・イズ・全国大会)	November 17, 2019
Hikari befriends Rei, who reveals that she is only good at rifle shooting. Yukio finishes her round with an impressive score after Izumi explains to Hikari and Yūko that having a routine could improve shooting accuracy. Komachi contemplates the rigorous training that she endured to participate in the regional qualifiers. While Karen does not do well, Kozakura remembers that she took up rifle shooting to spend more time with her friends. According to the current standings, Yukio, Misa, Hikari, Kozakura and Komachi are placed in the top five. Izumi does not score high enough in the third round. Yūko tries to cheer up Izumi by restocking on drinks at the grocery store. Erika informs Hikari that the Chidori RSC can still advance to the beam rifle nationals if the three top scorers have the highest total. Akira reminisces that she raised Erika like a younger sister during childhood. Ushio is considered the junior ace. After crashing the minivan into a hedge, Izumi and Yūko rush back to the gymnasium, where Erika has finished the fourth round with a great score. According to the final results, the Chidori RSC advances to the beam rifle nationals as a team.
7	"Studying Is Hard"; Transliteration: "Sutadi・Izu・Haado" (Japanese: スタディ・イズ・ハード)	November 24, 2019
After the end of the regional qualifiers in the evening, Hikari, Izumi, Erika and Yukio go to a diner called Oaizeriya, where they run into Akira and Misa. Passing by, Rei gives the stern advice of doing well in the upcoming beam rifle nationals as they all will represent the same prefecture. Hikari, Izumi, Erika and Yukio head to their homes after an exhausting day. The next morning at school, Hikari shares the good news with Marina and Ako, who are in total shock. After school, the Chidori RSC discuss how their parents reacted to the good news. Yūko warns Hikari, Izumi, Erika and Yukio that they must pass their finals in order to participate in the beam rifle nationals, in which Hikari and Yukio have failed their finals. Izumi and Erika tutor Hikari and Yukio during the weekend so that they can pass their makeup finals on the following week. After Yūko wonders which of the four of them is the most feminine, she ultimately cannot make up her mind, as all four of them has an incredible energy that they bring. Yūko later suggests that Hikari, Izumi, Erika and Yukio should not wear anything under their shooting coats.
7.5	"Nationals Are Right Before Us"; Transliteration: "Zenkoku Taikai・Izu・Mokuzen" (Japanese: 全国大会・イズ・目前)	December 1, 2019
This episode is a recapitulation of episodes 1 through 7, narrated by Hikari and Izumi.
8	"Our Battlefield Is Tsutsuga"; Transliteration: "Batorufiirudo・Izu・Tsutsuga" (Japanese: バトルフィールド・イズ・つつが)	December 8, 2019
With two weeks left until the nationals, the Chidori RSC discuss that height affects posture in rifle shooting. Akira trains for the air rifle nationals, which is more expensive to prepare for than the beam rifle nationals. It is learned that the nationals will be held at the Tsutsuga Rifle Range in Hiroshima, an isolated area in the mountains. On the day before the nationals, Hikari, Izumi, Erika, Yukio and Yūko travel to Hiroshima by train. Hikari runs into the Hozumi RSC, composed of club president Maho Kogomori, junior club member Sayu Sanada and sophomore club member Serena Nitta. Misa and Karen also travel by train, though Akira oversleeps and travels separately, while Kozakura, Rei and Komachi travel by plane. Everyone stays at an onsen hotel called Nukui Springs. Akira, Misa and Karen have a brief conversation with Hikari, Izumi, Erika and Yukio about romance, namely their ideal soulmate. Afterwards, Hikari, Izumi, Erika and Yukio stargaze outside on the asphalt. Late at night, Izumi and Kozakura wish each other good luck in the lobby while everyone else is asleep.
9	"Hozumi Is the Reigning Champ"; Transliteration: "Oja・Izu・Hozumi" (Japanese: 王者・イズ・峰澄)	December 15, 2019
The Chidori RSC travel to the Tsutsuga Rifle Range by shuttle bus. Everyone gets acquainted with the other competing teams, representing a total of thirty high schools. The first day is an official practice for the nationals. Yukio learns that Hikari wears her red hair ribbon for balance, while Izumi offers to buy Erika a visor to keep her hair out of her eyes. The Hozumi RSC won last year's nationals as the reigning champions. The second day begins the team tournament of the nationals. Yūko assigns Yukio in the first group, Erika in the second group, Hikari in the third group and Izumi on standby, initially not knowing that Hikari will have the most pressure to perform well. Akira contemplates whether or not her love of rifle shooting is weird. Serena recalls when she was recruited by Maho and Sayu to participate in the nationals. Meanwhile, Neneko Wada from Yaginuma High School has a heated battle against Ruri Hachigo from Ayaka Girls' High School. According to the official standings, the Chidori RSC, the Hozumi RSC and the Yaginuma RSC are respectively placed in the top three at the end of the first group.
10	"Hime in Crisis"; Transliteration: "Hime・Izu・Kuraishisu" (Japanese: 姫・イズ・クライシス)	December 22, 2019
Izumi prevents Hikari from being swindled into buying an expensive original innerwear by fortunately making a coin land on its side during a coin toss. Erika nervously boasts about planning to dominate the competition to Yukio, Akira and Misa. Maho is revealed to have a toned body. Akira hugs Erika to quell her nervousness. Before the second group begins, Sayu scopes out the competition and sets her sights on Erika. Toko Yosomiya from Yaginuma High School is positioned next to Sayu, whom Neneko observes as a southpaw. Sayu recalls that she became interested in rifle shooting because it was beautiful. While Erika has a rocky start in her performance, Sayu finishes with an impressive score despite botching her last shot, and Yayoi Hayamine from Ayaka Girls' High School proves to be a top shooter. Hikari ends up buying and wearing the expensive original innerwear. According to the official standings, the Hozumi RSC, the Ayaka Girls' RSC and the Chidori RSC are respectively placed in the top three at the end of the second group. Hikari is now left with the pressure to perform her best.
11	"Shooting Is Our Dream"; Transliteration: "Shūtingu・Izu・Dorīmu" (Japanese: シューティング・イズ・ドリーム)	December 29, 2019
Akira notices that Hikari and Maho are among the participants in the third group. Hikari makes a bullseye on her first shot, while it is revealed that Maho did weight training to improve the art of rifle shooting. Much to everyone's shock, Hikari is unexpectedly consistent with her bullseyes, earning her a spectacular score. According to the final results, the Hozumi RSC, the Chodori RSC, the Saiga Girls' RSC and the Hizaki RSC are placed in the top four at the end of the third group. Despite Hikari being a little disappointed that the Chidori RSC lost against the Hozumi RSC, her incredible performance catches the attention of Maho, who thanks Hikari for a great match. As the team tournament of the nationals comes to a close, Hikari, Izumi, Erika and Yukio enjoy a bath in the hot spring, while Karen and Ryōko briefly join them. At night, Hikari, Izumi, Erika, Yukio, Akira, Misa, Karen, Ryōko and Kozakura play with sparklers to celebrate the end of summer. Yukio, Misa, Erika, Hikari and Kozakura are the five girls representing their prefecture who will be participating in the upcoming individuals tournament of the nationals.
12	"The Finals Are Beginning"; Transliteration: "Fainaru・Izu・Biginingu" (Japanese: ファイナル・イズ・ビギニング)	January 18, 2020
Hikari explains that the individuals tournament of the nationals has an open round and a final round to determine the top three winners. Tae Nakagawa, a freshman from Akita Third High School, befriends Hikari. While Ryōko admires Misa as a role model, Hikari and Yukio purchase curry from a food truck. Misa does not score high enough that would guarantee a spot in the final round. Serena and Erika respectively place first and second, both advancing to the final round. Kozakura tells Misa that she will not be eligible for the final round. Meanwhile, Marina and Ako relax by the swimming pool as they wonder how well Hikari will do in the nationals. Hikari ends up scoring really low, leaving her dumbfounded. As Hikari steps outside to contemplate her journey in the nationals, crying in front of Izumi. Hikari rushes back inside to witness Maho, Serena and Yayoi being the top three winners of the nationals. As the individuals tournament of the nationals comes to a close, the Chidori RSC return to their clubroom as Hikari cherishes the memories that she made during the nationals, recalling that Maho motivated her to get better at rifle shooting.

== Reception ==
Anime News Network had four editors review the first episode of the anime: Theron Martin found the artistic qualities "nothing special" but gave praise to the main cast's comedic delivery and detailed information about laser-target rifles, calling it a "light-hearted diversion with enough humor to make it work." James Beckett found the plot, characters and production overall to be "blandly competent" and found little interest in the show's subject matter, saying it will probably cater only to an all-girl slice-of-life audience; Nick Creamer commended the "visual execution" of the humor delivered and the camaraderie amongst the main cast feeling believable, but gave note of the "stilted scene transitions, uneven jokes, and total predictability of structure and characterization" throughout the episode, saying it will only appeal to fans of the slice-of-life genre. The fourth reviewer, Rebecca Silverman, felt the plot was barebones and lacked urgency so that the girls' personalities can bounce off one another while using the rifles as more of a background setting.
