= Machico (singer) =

Japanese musical artist

- まちこ
- Born: Machiko Saitō; March 25, 1992 (age 34); Kure, Hiroshima, Japan
- Occupations: Singer; voice actress
- Years active: 2012–present
- Agent: Voice Kit
- Musical career
- Genres: J-pop; anison
- Instrument: Vocals
- Labels: Geneon Universal; Mastard Records; Nippon Columbia (2016–present)
- Website: machi.co

Machiko Saitō (齊藤 真知子, Saitō Machiko; born March 25, 1992), better known by her stage name Machiko or Machico, is a Japanese singer and voice actress from Kure, Hiroshima. After participating in an audition organized by Horipro, she made her music debut in 2012, singing a theme song for a PC game. She was cast as the character Tsubasa Ibuki in the mobile game The Idolmaster Million Live! in 2013. Apart from voice acting, she has performed theme songs for KonoSuba and Age 12. Machico released two albums between 2014 and 2015, and opened her official fanclub in late 2016.

She left her voice acting agency HoriPro International in 30 November 2022 and announced her new activity under Style Cube the next day.

== Biography ==
Machico is a native of Kure, Hiroshima. Machico's career began after she participated in the 36th Horipro Talent Scout Campaign in 2011, where she was a finalist. Although she was not declared the campaign's winner, she would make her media debut in 2012 when she was chosen to perform the song "Magical Happy Show!", which was used as the theme song to the 2012 visual novel Supipara: Alice the Magic Conductor; the single for "Magical Happy Show!" was released on May 23, 2012.

Machico debuted as a voice actress in 2013 when she was cast as the character Tsubasa Ibuki in the mobile game The Idolmaster Million Live! in 2013. The following year, she released her first album titled Colors, which was released on June 11, 2014; the album peaked at number 64 on the Oricon weekly charts. Her second album Colors II -RML- was released on April 8, 2015; the album peaked at number 86 on the Oricon weekly charts. That same year, she voiced the character Sophia Mertesacker in the anime television series World Break: Aria of Curse for a Holy Swordsman. She made a cameo as herself in the 2015 anime television series Seiyu's Life!.

Machico performed the song "Fantastic Dreamer", which was used as the opening theme to the 2016 anime television series KonoSuba; the single for "Fantastic Dreamer" was released on January 27, 2016, and it peaked at number 42 on the Oricon weekly charts. Her next single, "Yūki no Tsubasa" (勇気のつばさ, Wings of Courage) was released on November 9, 2016; the title track is used as the second ending theme to the anime television series Age 12. She portrayed the character Serina Nishiyama in the 2016 anime television series Three Leaves, Three Colors. She opened her official fanclub ZO≒NA in December 2016. Her fourth single "Tomorrow" was released on February 1, 2017; the title track is used as the opening theme to the second season of KonoSuba. She was cast as the character Icea Mize Valgalis in the 2017 anime television series WorldEnd. Her fifth single "Kore Kara" (コレカラ, From Now On) was released on January 31, 2018; the title track is used as the opening theme to the anime series The Ryuo's Work Is Never Done!. She also played the role of Tokai Teio in the multimedia franchise Umamusume: Pretty Derby.

Machico had a recurring role as Ayane Misaki in Kirakira PreCure a la Mode, the fourteenth season of the Pretty Cure franchise. She sang the ending theme of the franchise's seventeenth season Healin' Good Pretty Cure, and the opening theme of Tropical-Rouge! Pretty Cure and Delicious Party Pretty Cure. She also played the role of Hikari Kokura, the protagonist of the anime series Rifle Is Beautiful; she and her co-stars performed the series' opening theme "Let's go! Rifling 4!!!!" and ending theme "Yūyake Friends" under the name Rifling 4.

== Discography ==
=== Albums ===
Release date	Title	Peak ranking	
Release date	Title	JPN	JPN 100
June 11, 2014	COLORS	63	
April 8, 2015	COLORS II -RML-	86	
July 27, 2016	Ambitious*	63	
May 24, 2017	SOL	68	

=== Singles ===
Year	Title	Peak ranking		Album	Notes
Year	Title	JPN	Hot 100	Album	Notes
2012	"Magical Happy Show!"	87	89	Non-album single	Supipara – Alice the Magical Conductor main theme song
2016	"Fantastic Dreamer"	42	43	Ambitious*; SOL	KonoSuba: God's Blessing on This Wonderful World! opening theme
2016	"Yūki no Tsubasa"	114	—	SOL	Age 12: A Little Heart-Pounding second ending theme
2017	"Tomorrow"	23	26	SOL	KonoSuba 2 opening theme
2018	"Kore Kara"	32	—	Non-album single	The Ryuo's Work Is Never Done! opening theme
2019	"1mm Symphony"	42	26	Non-album single	KonoSuba: God's Blessing on this Wonderful World! Legend of Crimson theme song
2020	"Kokuho High End"	—	—	Non-album single	Mobile game Magia Record: Puella Magi Madoka Magica Side Story; originally as the ending theme of "Sayuki Steps Up! desuu~" event in 2019, released as a bonus in the Magia Record Special CD 2: Vocal Song Mini Collection
2020	Miracle and a Link Ring!	—	—	Non-album single	Healin' Good Pretty Cure first ending theme
2021	"Viva! Spark! Tropical-Rouge! Pretty Cure"	15	—	Non-album single	Tropical-Rouge! Pretty Cure opening theme
2022	"Cheers! Delicious Party Pretty Cure"	—	—	Non-album single	Delicious Party Pretty Cure opening theme
2024	"Growing Up"	—	—	Non-album single	KonoSuba 3 opening theme
2024	"Mystic Light Quest"	—	—	Image song for character Pepe in video game Arknights	

== Filmography ==
=== Television animation ===
- Seiyu's Life! (2015), Machiko
- World Break: Aria of Curse for a Holy Swordsman (2015), Sophia Mertesacker
- Three Leaves, Three Colors (2016), Serina Nishiyama
- Kirakira PreCure a la Mode (2017), Ayane Misaki
- WorldEnd (2017), Ithea Myse Valgulious
- Umamusume: Pretty Derby (2018–2023), Tokai Teio
- Chidori RSC (2019), Hikari Kokura
- Iwa-Kakeru! -Sport Climbing Girls- (2020), Kurea Ooba
- Magia Record, Sayuki Fumino (ep.3)
- Fuuto PI (2022), Moriguchi Monako
- Farming Life in Another World (2023), Sena
- Himitsu no AiPri (2024–2026), Hiiro Aozora
- VTuber Legend: How I Went Viral After Forgetting to Turn Off My Stream (2024), Hikari Matsuriya
- Dead Account (2026), Hiyori Haijima
- Roll Over and Die (2026), Sara Anvilen

=== Anime films ===
- Idol Bu Show (2022), Hikaru Fuwa
- Guardy Girls (2022), Laurie
- Colorful Stage! The Movie: A Miku Who Can't Sing (2025), Nene Kusanagi

=== Video games ===
- The Idolmaster Million Live! (2013), Tsubasa Ibuki
- The Idolmaster Million Live!: Theater Days (2017), Tsubasa Ibuki
- Magia Record: Puella Magi Madoka Magica Side Story (2019), Sayuki Fumino
- Project Sekai: Colorful Stage feat. Hatsune Miku (2020), Nene Kusanagi
- The Idolmaster: Starlit Season (2020), Tsubasa Ibuki
- Umamusume: Pretty Derby (2021), Tokai Teio
- Fate/Grand Order (2021), Nazo no Ranmaru X
- Muse Dash (2022), Kirisame Marisa
- Granblue Fantasy (2022), Tyra
- Arknights (2024), Pepe
- Girls' Frontline 2: Exilium (2024), Sharkry
- Zenless Zone Zero (2024), Soukaku
- Nekopara: Sekai Connect (2026), Sumomo

=== Drama CD ===
- The Idolmaster Million Live! (2015–present), Tsubasa Ibuki
