= Healer Girl =

Japanese anime television series

- Key visual

ヒーラー・ガール (Hīrā Gāru)
- Anime television series
- Directed by: Yasuhiro Irie
- Written by: Noboru Kimura
- Music by: Ryo Takahashi
- Studio: 3Hz
- Licensed by: Crunchyroll
- Original network: Tokyo MX, BS11
- Original run: April 4, 2022 – June 20, 2022
- Episodes: 12
- Manga

Healer Girl espressivo
- Written by: Imo Ōno
- Published by: Media Factory
- Magazine: Monthly Comic Alive
- Original run: May 26, 2022 – April 26, 2023
- Volumes: 2
- icon

Healer Girl (ヒーラー・ガール, Hīrā Gāru) is an original Japanese anime television series animated by studio 3Hz. The series is directed by Yasuhiro Irie, written by Noboru Kimura, and features character designs by Yukie Akiya, and music composed by Ryo Takahashi. It features singer voice actress choir unit Healer Girls, composed of the four main cast members. The series aired from April to June 2022.

== Plot ==
Those that use "voice medicine," the ability to heal injuries and cure illnesses with song, are called "healers." There are three apprentice healers working at the Karasuma Voice Treatment Center. Kana Fujii, an energetic girl who sets the tone, the strong-willed lady Reimi Itsushiro, and Hibiki Morishima who is caring but firm. These three first year high school girls are training after school to become full-fledged Healers. With the addition of Sonia Yanagi, a returnee who is a certified C-level healer, the girls are singing songs of healing as they work towards their dreams.

== Characters ==
Kana Fujii (藤井 かな, Fujii Kana)
Voiced by: Karin Isobe
A healer apprentice of Karasuma, Kana decided to become a healer after she had an asthma attack on a plane and a healer helped her recover. Kana has innate talent but sometimes struggles with technical skills and knowledge.
Hibiki Morishima (森嶋 響, Morishima Hibiki)
Voiced by: Akane Kumada
Hibiki is an apprentice healer along with Kana and Reimi. She is related to her teacher Karasuma, who comes to stay with Hibiki's large family in the country in the summer. She always loved to sing as a child and decided to become a healer when her elementary school music teacher encouraged her. She lives with Karasuma in the clinic.
Reimi Itsushiro (五城 玲美, Itsushiro Reimi)
Voiced by: Marina Horiuchi
Like Kana and Hibiki, Reimi is an apprentice of Karasuma, whom she idolizes. Reimi's parents are successful opera singers who live overseas. She lives with Aoi, a part-time maid and music student, who has become like a big sister to Reimi.
Sonia Yanagi (矢薙 ソニア, Yanagi Sonia)
Voiced by: Chihaya Yoshitake
She is a first-year high school student at the same school as Kana. She is a skilled healer who has already obtained a C-level healer certification through an overseas skipping class system. For some reason, she sees Ria, a renowned genius healer, as her rival.
Shinobu Honosaka (穂ノ坂 しのぶ, Honosaka Shinobu)
Voiced by: Miyu Takagi
She is the granddaughter of Honosaka Healing Center. She is a childhood friend of Sonia's and aspires to become a "sonic musician" who composes healing music.
Ria Karasuma (烏丸 理彩, Karasuma Ria)
Voiced by: Ayahi Takagaki
The mentor to Kana, Hibiki, and Reimi, who refer to her as shishō (mistress), Ria is a skilled and renowned healer who runs her own clinic and is known as "The Witch of KMU". Ria has a medical license but left the practice of Western medicine shortly after attaining it to become a music healer. She also conducts research on music healing, hoping to advance the field.
Shoko Nagisa (渚 笙子, Nagisa Shōko)
Voiced by: Hisako Tōjō
She is a pharmacist working at Karasuma Voice Therapy Clinic. She has known Ria since their school days, and is a friendly person who does not hesitate to treat everyone with open arms.

== Media ==
=== Anime ===
The original anime television series created was announced on April 30, 2021. The series is animated by studio 3Hz and directed by Yasuhiro Irie, with Noboru Kimura writing the scripts, Yukie Akiya designing the characters, and Ryo Takahashi composing the music. The series aired from April 4 to June 20, 2022, on Tokyo MX and BS11. Healer Girls performed the opening theme song "Feel You, Heal You", as well as the ending theme song "Believe like Singing." Crunchyroll streamed the series.

==== Episodes ====
The episodes in this series are called "Songs" (歌唱, kasho).

Song	Title	Directed by	Written by	Storyboarded by	Original release date
1	"Kana Fujii, Healer (Apprentice)!"; Transliteration: "Hīrā (Minarai) no Fujii Kana, Desu!" (Japanese: ヒーラー（見習い）の藤井かな、です！)	Yasuhiro Irie	Noboru Kimura	Yasuhiro Irie	April 4, 2022
2	"Can I Take a Picture? Or Maybe a Video?"; Transliteration: "Shashin Totte Ii? Moshiku wa Dōga de" (Japanese: 写真撮っていい？もしくは動画で)	Yasuhiro Irie	Noboru Kimura	Yasuhiro Irie	April 11, 2022
3	"Cleanup, Run • Run • Run"; Transliteration: "Osōji, Ran Ran Ran" (Japanese: お掃除、ラン・ラン・ラン)	Yasuhiro Irie	Noboru Kimura	Yasuhiro Irie	April 18, 2022
4	"First Steps, Horror, and a First Job!"; Transliteration: "Ippo to Horā to Hatsu Shigoto!" (Japanese: 一歩とホラーと初仕事！)	Yasuhiro Irie	Noboru Kimura	Yasuhiro Irie	April 25, 2022
5	"Blue Skies, Green Mountains, River Battles and the Galactic Station"; Transliteration: "Sora wa Aokute Yama wa Midori, Kawa no Tatakai Ginga Sutēshon" (Japanese: 空は青くて山は緑、川の戦い銀河ステーション)	Yasuhiro Irie	Noboru Kimura	Yasuhiro Irie	May 2, 2022
6	"Become My Servant • Russian Food and Sweet Dreams"; Transliteration: "Watashi no Geboku ni Onarinasai Roshia Ryōri de Ii Yume o" (Japanese: 私の下僕におなりなさい・ロシア料理でいい夢を)	Motoki Nakanishi	Noboru Kimura	Yasuhiro Irie	May 9, 2022
7	"A Culture Festival Full of Surprises"; Transliteration: "Bunkasai Manpuku Sapuraizu" (Japanese: 文化祭満腹サプライズ)	Yasuhiro Irie	Noboru Kimura	Yasuhiro Irie	May 16, 2022
8	"I Love Maids • You're Fired"; Transliteration: "Meido-san ga Daisuki Desu Kubi yo" (Japanese: メイドさんが大好きです・クビよ)	Masanori Takahashi	Noboru Kimura	Yasuhiro Irie	May 23, 2022
9	"The Best Guarantee • Buy the CD"; Transliteration: "Ichiban no Osumitsuki Shī Dī Katte ne" (Japanese: 一番のお墨付き・CD買ってね)	Ryōki Kamitsubo	Noboru Kimura	Yasuhiro Irie	May 30, 2022
10	"Halloween • Masquerade • Butterfly!"; Transliteration: "Harowīn Masukarēdo Batafurāi" (Japanese: ハロウィ～ン・マスカレ～ド・バタフラ～イ)	Takuma Suzuki	Noboru Kimura	Yasuhiro Irie	June 6, 2022
11	"Sharks and Training Camp! Let's Climb Together!"; Transliteration: "Same to Gasshuku, Issho ni Nobotte Ikō!" (Japanese: サメと合宿、一緒に登っていこう！)	Yoshihisa Iida	Noboru Kimura	Yasuhiro Irie	June 13, 2022
12	"We're C-Rank Healers!"; Transliteration: "Watashitachi, Shī-kyū Hīrā Desu!" (Japanese: 私たち、C級ヒーラーです！)	Takuma Suzuki	Noboru Kimura	Yasuhiro Irie	June 20, 2022

=== Spin-off manga ===
A spin-off manga series written and illustrated by Imo Ōno, titled Healer Girl espressivo, was serialized in Media Factory's Monthly Comic Alive magazine from May 26, 2022, to April 26, 2023.

No.	Release date	ISBN
1	October 21, 2022	978-4-04-681923-9
2	June 22, 2023	978-4-04-682691-6
