= Akane Kumada =

Japanese voice actress

- 熊田 茜音
- Born: February 3, 2000 (age 26); Tokyo, Japan
- Occupations: Voice actress; singer
- Years active: 2018–present
- Agent: Apollo Bay
- Notable work: Rifle Is Beautiful as Izumi Shibusawa; Oda Cinnamon Nobunaga as Ichiko Oda; Healer Girl as Hibiki Morishima
- Height: 167 cm (5 ft 6 in)
- Website: kumaka.jp

Akane Kumada (熊田 茜音, Kumada Akane; born February 3, 2000) is a Japanese voice actress and singer. She is affiliated with Apollo Bay and made her voice acting debut in 2018. She is known for her roles as Izumi Shibusawa in Rifle Is Beautiful and Ichiko Oda in Oda Cinnamon Nobunaga. In 2020, she made her major debut as a musician under Lantis with the release of her first single "Sunny Sunny Girl", the title track of which was used as the opening theme to Oda Cinnamon Nobunaga.

== Biography ==
=== Early life ===
Kumada was born in Tokyo on February 3, 2000. From an early age, she had been a fan of the series Hunter × Hunter. She was inspired to become a voice actress after watching the anime series Puella Magi Madoka Magica, as well as citing Maaya Uchida as a personality she looked up to. While in junior high school, she was a member of a badminton club, while she played the koto in high school. After graduating from high school, she decided to participating in voice acting auditions. In 2017, she won the Grand Prix at the Anisong Stars audition.

=== Voice acting career ===
Kumada began her voice acting activities in 2018, voicing a character in the anime series Planet With. Later that year, she voiced her first named role as Ellen in That Time I Got Reincarnated as a Slime. In 2019, she voiced Izumi Shibusawa in Rifle Is Beautiful; she and her co-stars performed the series' opening and ending themes. In 2020, she voiced Ichiko Oda in Oda Cinnamon Nobunaga. She will voice the characters Mina in Drugstore in Another World and Hibiki Morishima in Healer Girl.

=== Music career ===
Kumada made her music debut under Lantis in 2020 with the release of her first single "Sunny Sunny Girl"; the title track was used as the opening theme to Oda Cinnamon Nobunaga. Her second single "Brand New Diary/Mahō no Kaze" (Brand new diary/まほうのかぜ) was released on April 21, 2021; "Brand New Diary" was used as the opening theme to the anime series The Slime Diaries, while "Mahō no Kaze" was used as the opening theme to the anime series Super Cub.

== Filmography ==
=== Anime ===
2018

- Planet With, Kigurumi tribe member
- That Time I Got Reincarnated as a Slime, Ellen

2019

- Kira Kira Happy Hirake! Cocotama, Chiharu Nanase
- Rifle Is Beautiful, Izumi Shibusawa

2020

- Oda Cinnamon Nobunaga, Ichiko Oda

2021

- The Slime Diaries: That Time I Got Reincarnated as a Slime, Ellen
- Drugstore in Another World, Mina

2022

- Healer Girl, Hibiki Morishima

2024

- I Was Reincarnated as the 7th Prince so I Can Take My Time Perfecting My Magical Ability, Alieze

== Discography ==
=== Singles ===
Title	Peak Oricon position
"Sunny Sunny Girl": Release date: January 29, 2020	131
"Brand New Diary/Mahō no Kaze" (Brand new diary/まほうのかぜ): Release date: April 21, 2021	57
