= Age 12 =

Japanese manga series by Nao Maita

- Cover of volume 1.

12歳。 (Jūni-Sai.)
- Genre: Romance
- Manga
- Written by: Nao Maita
- Published by: Shogakukan
- Magazine: Ciao
- Original run: August 3, 2012 – October 3, 2019
- Volumes: 20
- Original video animation
- Directed by: Masaharu Okuwaki
- Music by: Kaori Ohkoshi
- Studio: SynergySP (1, 9-12) Ascension (2-8)
- Released: April 3, 2014 – December 3, 2015
- Runtime: 14 minutes
- Episodes: 12
- Video game

12-Sai. Honto no Kimochi
- Developer: Happinet
- Genre: Romance, adventure
- Platform: Nintendo 3DS
- Released: December 18, 2014
- Anime television series

Age 12: A Little Heart-Pounding
- Directed by: Masaharu Okuwaki
- Written by: Fumi Tsubota
- Music by: Motoyoshi Iwasaki
- Studio: OLM
- Original network: Tokyo MX, AT-X, Sun TV
- Original run: April 4, 2016 – December 19, 2016
- Episodes: 24

Age 12 (12歳。, Jūni-sai.) is a Japanese slice of life romance shōjo manga series written and illustrated by Nao Maita. It began serialization in August 2012 in Shogakukan's Ciao manga magazine and ended in October 2019. It was published in twenty volumes. The manga was adapted into an original video animation that was released in April 2014 and it was also adapted into a video game and a TV anime series released in 2016.

== Plot ==
Hanabi Ayase and her best friend, Yui Aoi, are 6th graders in school. When Hanabi is chosen to work with Yuuto Takao for an upcoming test, she begins to fall in love with him and they both start dating. Yui also falls in love with Kazuma Hiyama, after he protects her from a classmate who talked about Yui behind her back, and they start dating as well.

== Characters ==
=== Main characters ===
Hanabi Ayase (綾瀬 花日, Ayase Hanabi)
Voiced by: Ai Kakuma
Hanabi is the first protagonist of the series along with Yui and is part of a three-girl clique with Yui and Marin. She is very child-like, from her appearance to her behaviour, with her two signature pigtails and innocent charm that makes her oblivious to the boys' actions in class unless it is very obvious. She gets close to Yuuto during a music session when their homeroom teacher required them to partner with the classmate they are sitting beside, which happened to be him. Initially oblivious towards his feelings for her, she finally develops feelings for him when they share their first kiss. She has a bit of a one-sided rivalry with Cocoa, who is the most popular girl in class and wants to be Yuuto's girlfriend, as she believes them to be a perfect couple.
Yui Aoi (蒼井 結衣, Aoi Yui)
Voiced by: Nanami Haruno (OVA); Juri Kimura (TV series)
Yui is the second protagonist of the series along with Hanabi and is part of a three-girl clique along with Hanabi and Marin. She is developing both physically and mentally the earliest out of the group, but is still insecure due to the presence of not having a mother around to help, so she often asks Marin. Projecting a model student air, Yui initially dislikes Hiyama due to his delinquent-like attitude and his hobby of teasing her, but grew to like him after he spent a long time trying to find something important for her that she lost.
Yuuto Takao (高尾 優斗, Takao Yūto)
Voiced by: Sōma Saitō
Yuuto is Hanabi's boyfriend and is very affectionate with her. He is the most popular boy in school, matched with his good looks and mature appearance that makes almost all the girls, especially Cocoa, fawn over him. He develops feelings for Hanabi early in the story and kisses her on the rooftop. They start going out and become Class 6-2's first actual couple.
Kazuma Hiyama (桧山 一翔, Hiyama Kazuma)
Voiced by: Yūichi Iguchi (OVA/game); Shun Horie (TV series)
Kazuma starts off as a delinquent-like prankster and a rash speaker, but actually has a soft side to him. Having a crush on Yui early in the series, he covers it up by teasing her and leading a group of three boys to do foolish antics to rile her, but stopped soon after. He helps Yui find a precious item that she lost and confesses when she does so too. They start going out and become Class 6-2's second couple after Hanabi and Yuuto.

=== Supporting characters ===
Marin Ogura (小倉まりん, Ogura Marin)
Voiced by: Mayuki Makiguchi
Hanabi and Yui's best friend and makes up the three-girl clique along with them. She thinks that boys her age are immature but helps her friends during their love troubles normally by acting like a love adviser, conveying the wisdom of her unseen elder sister, who has apparently had several boyfriends.
Cocoa Hamana (浜名 心愛, Hamana Kokoa)
Voiced by: Sayuri Hara
Cocoa is Hanabi's love rival for Yuuto. She does everything to become his girlfriend, including dishonest and ungainly means. In front of people, she acts sweet and innocent, but acts mean to make Hanabi lose her self-esteem and confidence.
Ayumu Tsutsumi (堤 歩, Tsutsumi Ayumu)
Voiced by: Tetsuya Kakihara
Hanabi's childhood friend who has just come back from Tokyo. He also wants to be her boyfriend.
Eikou (エイコー, Eikō)
Voiced by: Takumi Watanabe
Eikou is one of the biggest pranksters in Class 6-2. He teases girls, makes girls' popularity rankings (whose winner is usually Cocoa), and collects Yuuto's "golden thoughts".
Tomoya (トモヤ)
Voiced by: Taishi Murata
Tomoya is one of the biggest pranksters in Class 6-2. He teases girls, makes girls' popularity rankings (whose winner is usually Cocoa), and collects Yuuto's "golden thoughts".
Inaba Mikami (三上 稲葉, Mikami Inaba)
Voiced by: Atsushi Tamaru (game); Shinnosuke Tachibana (TV series)
Inaba is a fellow student from Yui's cram school who took an interest in Yui after hearing that she had a boyfriend.

== Media ==
=== Manga ===
Volumes

- 1 (March 1, 2013)
- 2 (July 1, 2013)
- 3 (November 29, 2013)
- 4 (July 1, 2014)
- 5 (October 30, 2014)
- 6 (February 27, 2015)
- 7 (July 27, 2015)
- 8 (December 23, 2015)
- 9 (April 27, 2016)
- 10 (November 29, 2016)
- 10.5 (December 26, 2016)
- 11 (March 2, 2017)
- 12 (July 21, 2017)
- 13 (November 29, 2017)
- 14 (March 30, 2018)
- 15 (August 1, 2018)
- 16 (February 27, 2019)
- 17 (July 1, 2019)
- 18 (October 31, 2019)
- 19 (December 26, 2019)
- 20 (July 1, 2020)

=== Anime ===
==== OVAs ====
The ending theme is "12-Year-Old's Love" (恋の12歳, Koi no 12-Sai) by "Singing Cat's Song Company" (うたたねこ歌劇団, Utata Neko Uta Gekidan).

First season

No.	Title	Original release date
1	"Kiss, Hate, Love" "Kisu, Kirai, Suki" (Japanese: 〜キス・キライ・スキ〜)	April 3, 2014
2	"Secret" "Himitsu" (Japanese: 〜ヒミツ〜)	July 3, 2014
3	"Confession Age 1" "Kokuhaku Age 1" (Japanese: 〜コクハク age1〜)	September 3, 2014
4	"Confession Age 2" "Kokuhaku Age 2" (Japanese: 〜コクハク age2〜)	October 3, 2014
5	"Confession Age 3" "Kokuhaku Age 3" (Japanese: 〜コクハク age3〜)	November 3, 2014
6	"Christmas" "Kurisumasu" (Japanese: 〜クリスマス〜)	December 3, 2014
7	"Beginning" "Hajimari" (Japanese: 〜ハジマリ〜)	January 3, 2015
8	"Names" "Namae" (Japanese: 〜ナマエ〜)	January 3, 2015

Second season

No.	Title	Original release date
1	"Boyfriend Age 1"	July 3, 2015
2	"Boyfriend Age 2"	September 3, 2015
3	"Boyfriend Age 3"	October 3, 2015
4	"Boyfriend Age 4"	December 3, 2015

==== TV series ====
The TV anime is split into two seasons, the first half aired in April 2016, while the second half aired in October. The opening theme in episodes 1–12 is "Sweet Sensation" by Rie Murakawa, while the ending theme is "Cotona MODE" by AŌP and the opening theme in episodes 13–24 is "Ano ne, Kimi dake ni" by AŌP, while the ending theme is "Yuuki no Tsubasa" by Machico.

No.	Title	Original release date
1	"Kiss, Hate, Love" "Kisu, Kirai, Suki" (Japanese: キス・キライ・スキ)	April 4, 2016
Finally, Hanabi Ayase, Yui Aoi, Marin Ogura and the others are 6th graders! One day, the girls are talking about kissing. Later, the homeroom teacher announces the recorder playing test. Hanabi ends up paired with Yuuto Takao. But when they see their teacher with another teacher kissing, they accidentally kiss!
2	"Confession" "Kokuhaku" (Japanese: コクハク)	April 11, 2016
At Yui's household the bath broke and she has to take bath at Hiyama Bathhouse. Even though she decided not to fall in love, she starts having feelings for Kazuma Hiyama. At the same time, another boy confesses to her, though Yui politely turns him down, saying that she likes someone else. He responds by mysteriously touching her arm. Later, Kazuma gets into a fight with the boy who confessed to Yui, and Yui seeks to find out why. Another girl tells Yui that the boys have been touching the girls arms because one of them said that the arm is as soft as the breasts. This girl says that the boy who confessed to Yui started asking people if they wanted to know what Yui's breasts feel like. She reveals that that's why Kazuma fought with him. Yui realizes that Kazuma was only trying to protect her by fighting, and goes over to the Hiyama Bathouse to confess her feelings to him, where she learns that he likes her as well.
3	"Double Date" "W Dēto" (Japanese: Wデート)	April 18, 2016
Yuuto asked Hanabi to go out with him. His girlfriend convinces him to take Yui and Kazuma along with them. The two couples go on a double date at the mall.
4	"Triangle" "Toraianguru" (Japanese: トライアングル)	April 25, 2016
Class 6-2 has a new student: Hanabi's childhood friend who has just came back from Tokyo, who starts having a crush for Hanabi, despite seeming to be a bit of a bully.
5	"Birthday" "Bāsudē" (Japanese: バースデー)	May 2, 2016
Hanabi and Ayumu go shopping to get a present for Yuuto's birthday, after which Hanabi will go on a date with Yuuto and give him his present. Ayumu purposefully makes her late for the date, and tries to tell her that he likes her, but is interrupted by Yuuto. Due to a misunderstanding, Hanabi ends up thinking that Ayumu hates her, which depresses her, because she had grown to want to be his friend.
6	"Boyfriend" "Bōifurendo" (Japanese: ボーイフレンド)	May 9, 2016
Ayumu tries to take Hanabi away from Yuuto. They wind up in a race. Cocoa, who wants to be Yuuto's girlfriend, decides to help Ayumu win. Can Hanabi and Yuuto discover the truth?
7	"Beginning" "Hajimari" (Japanese: ハジマリ)	May 16, 2016
After Kazuma asked Yui to walk her home, she thinks what does she like him for. The answer finds it's begin in previous year...
8	"Names" "Namae" (Japanese: ナマエ)	May 23, 2016
Hanabi and Yui try to address Yuuto and Kazuma by their names, and to make the boys do the same. In the end, only Yui and Kazuma manage to, when Hanabi and Yuuto couldn't.
9	"Friends" "Tomodachi" (Japanese: トモダチ)	May 30, 2016
Due to a misunderstanding, Hanabi and Yui fall out with each other and won't speak to each other for the next few days. In the end, Hanabi reconciles with Yui while defending the latter from other girls from another school.
10	"The Weaver Girl and the Cowherd" "Orihime Hikoboshi" (Japanese: オリヒメヒコボシ)	June 6, 2016
With the Tanabata coming along, Hanabi's homeroom teacher asked the class to write something nice about their classmates in their Tanzaku in hopes that it will strengthen the bond between boys and girls in the class. Meanwhile, Cocoa plans to sabotage the relationship between Hanabi and Yuuto again by borrowing the boys' camera to make group picture of herself with Yuuto, which fails.
11	"Summer Love" "Natsukoi" (Japanese: ナツコイ)	June 13, 2016
After accidentally hitting Yui on the head with a football during the gym lesson, Kazuma invites her to a pool date as an apology and they invite Hanabi and Yuuto. However, Eikou and his pranksters overhear the girl's conversation and on the day of the pool date, they keep spoiling the couples' time and mood, so it's up to Kazuma to chase them away.
12	"Fireworks" "Hanabi" (Japanese: ハナビ)	June 20, 2016
With Yui's cram school lessons and Kazuma's work in his family's bathhouse, Hanabi and Yuuto are left to go on a date at the summer festival. Even with Eikou and his pranksters and the other girls keeping the couple apart (which turned out to be Cocoa's plan to separate them), Hanabi and Yuuto manage have a good time at their date and see the fireworks together. After the fireworks Yuuto managed to take the courage and say Hanabi's name through a recording toy rabbit, much to her joy and each other's embarrassment. Meanwhile, another boy from Yui's cram school takes an interest in Yui (foretelling something unpleasant in the next season).
13	"Like, Kiss, Kiss!?" "Suki, Kisu, Kisu!?" (Japanese: スキ・キス・キス！？)	October 3, 2016
After entering her puberty, Yui Aoi started having pimples on her face, which worries her that because her pimple, Kazuma might not like. But Kazuma confronts some girls who were trying to steal him away from Yui, after hearing about her pimple and worries, and Yui herself, and tells them her pimple won't change a thing. After they accidentally kiss and receiving an invitation to Kazuma's house, Hanabi and Marin encourage Yui to go make a step forward in their relationship. But after a bad moment at Kazuma's house, Yui runs off with tears and meet Inaba Mikami from her cram school, where they later talk and he makes a move on her. But Kazuma follows her and takes her away from Inaba, and they reconcile. On next day, Eikou publishes a secret taken photo of Yui and Kazuma's kiss and distributes it to Yui's cram school, shocking both Yui, Kazuma, and surprising Inaba.
14	"Rival" "Raibaru" (Japanese: ライバル)	October 10, 2016
At cram school, Inaba tries to make Yui like him, but in the end she thinks of him as nothing more than a playboy. After Inaba defends a friend of Yui's from cram school who got sent to the principal's office, Yui begins to see him in a different light.
15	"Promise" "Yakusoku" (Japanese: ヤクソク)	October 17, 2016
Parent's Day is coming up in class 6-2, and a lot of the family members of the students are coming to the class. Hanabi's brother is going to be coming. At first, she is looking forward to introducing him to Yuuto, but she starts to think that he might not approve of her dating at such a young age, and is torn about whether or not to tell him. On Parent's Day, Hanabi feels guilty about not introducing Yuuto to her brother properly. After talking with Yuuto about it, they pinky-promise to like each other forever.
16	"Heart" "Kokoro" (Japanese: ココロ)	October 24, 2016
Yui helps the girls in her class make wish bracelets, which are bracelets that, if worn by the person you like and yourself, will make the two of you stay together forever. Yui makes two for her and Kazuma, but loses hers accidentally. Inaba helps her look for it, but Kazuma is the one who finds it and gives it back to her. Kazuma is upset that Yui didn't tell him that she had lost it, and she starts crying, prompting Inaba to comfort her.
17	"After the Rain" "Ameagari" (Japanese: アメアガリ)	October 31, 2016
Inaba takes Yui to the fair to cheer her up. He ties her wish bracelet to a balloon and sets it free to symbolize her leaving Kazuma. Yui chases after it into a Haunted House. Kazuma finds her in it and, knowing that she is afraid, leads her out. Kazuma and Yui stand up against Inaba and make it clear that Yui only has feelings for Kazuma.
18	"Balance" "Baransu" (Japanese: バランス)	November 7, 2016
Class 6-2 is performing a school play. The play is Cinderella, and Yui is cast as Cinderella and Yuuto as the prince. This leads everyone to say that Yui and Yuuto are perfect together because of their height difference. Hanabi starts worrying about how much shorter she is than Yuuto, but she decides it doesn't matter after Yuuto confirms his love for her.
19	"One-sided Love" "Kataomoi" (Japanese: カタオモイ)	November 14, 2016
20	"Adult" "Otona" (Japanese: オトナ)	November 21, 2016
21	"School Trip" "Shūgaku Ryokō" (Japanese: シュウガクリョコウ)	November 28, 2016
22	"Bye Bye" "Baibai" (Japanese: バイバイ)	December 5, 2016
23	"Forever" "Eien" (Japanese: エイエン)	December 12, 2016
24	"I Love You" "Daisuki" (Japanese: ダイスキ)	December 19, 2016

== Reception ==
Volume 3 reached the 47th place on the weekly Oricon manga chart and, as of December 8, 2013, has sold 36,632 copies; volume 4 reached the 20th place and, as of July 13, 2014, has sold 53,162 copies; volume 5 reached the 38th place and, as of November 9, 2014, has sold 50,161 copies.

It was nominated for Best Children's Manga at the 38th Kodansha Manga Awards. In 2019, Age 12 won the 64th Shogakukan Manga Award for the children category.
