= Anna Yamaki =

Japanese voice actress and singer

- 八巻 アンナ
- Born: 15 October
- Occupation: Voice actress
- Years active: 2017–present
- Employer: Remax
- Notable work: The Idolmaster Shiny Colors as Sakuya Shirase; Rifle Is Beautiful as Yukio Igarashi; Loopers as Ritapon

Anna Yamaki (八巻 アンナ, Yamaki Anna; born 15 October) is a Japanese voice actress from Tottori Prefecture, affiliated with Remax. She is known for starring as Sakuya Shirase in The Idolmaster Shiny Colors, Yukio Igarashi in Rifle Is Beautiful, and Ritapon in Loopers.

== Biography ==
Anna Yamaki, a native of Tottori Prefecture, was born on 15 October. She studied the piano, played the drums in high school, and played table tennis during her youth.

She started considering a voice acting career as an elementary school student and attended a vocational school as a high school student, before going to attend a university while studying acting at the same time. She subsequently graduated from the Doshisha University Department of Cultural History.

In 2018, Yamaki was cast as Sakuya Shirase, one of the five members of the unit L'Antica, in The Idolmaster Shiny Colors, a spinoff of The Idolmaster franchise. Since then, she has performed in several Idolmaster music releases, including the 2018 single "The Idolmaster Shiny Colors Brilliant Wing 03: Babel City Grace" (which charted at #13 in the Oricon Singles Chart) and the 2022 single "The Idolmaster Shiny Colors Synthe-Side 01" (which charted at #29 in the Oricon Singles Chart). She reprised her role in the 2024 anime adaptation.

In 2019, she starred as Yukio Igarashi in Rifle Is Beautiful, and she performed the anime's opening and ending themes as part of the tie-in musical quartet Rifling 4. She starred as Ritapon in Key's 2021 visual novel Loopers.

In August 2022, a Twitter account that appeared to belong to Yamaki, separate from her official one, containing suspicious tweets was discovered. On 30 August, her agency Remax responded to the incident posted a handwritten comment from Yamaki on their website, admitting to and apologizing for these posts. On the 2 September 2022 episode of her Niconico Live show Yamaki Anna no Anna Koto Konna Koto!, Yamaki spent ten minutes on an apology where she had black hair and wore a black suit.

Her hobby is appreciating kofun, temples, shrines, and museums. She is a supporter of the owarai duo Chi-Mon Cho-Chu.

== Filmography ==
=== Anime ===
| Year | Title | Role | Ref. |
|---|---|---|---|
| 2018 | Between the Sky and Sea | Tagirihime | |
| 2018 | My Sweet Tyrant | Maya | |
| 2019 | A Certain Scientific Accelerator | Female researcher | |
| 2019 | Rifle Is Beautiful | Yukio Igarashi | |
| 2019 | Teasing Master Takagi-san | Cake Shop Clerk | |
| 2019 | Wasteful Days of High School Girls | Erika | |
| 2020 | A3! | Announcer | |
| 2020 | Is the Order a Rabbit? | Customer | |
| 2020 | The Irregular at Magic High School | Woman | |
| 2021 | Mars Red | Ayame | |
| 2021 | Muv-Luv Alternative | Misae Munakata | |
| 2021 | Re:Zero | Otto's mother, etc. | |
| 2022 | JoJo's Bizarre Adventure: Stone Ocean | Kurokami | |
| 2023 | Bungo Stray Dogs | Actress A, Anchor, TV announcer | |
| 2024 | Blue Exorcist | Ikō Kishi | |
| 2024 | Orb: On the Movements of the Earth | Heretic (Ep. 11) | |
| 2024 | The Idolmaster Shiny Colors | Sakuya Shirase | |
| 2024 | The Strongest Tank's Labyrinth Raids | Adventurer B | |
| 2026 | Chained Soldier 2 | Kaiko Itsuki | |
| 2027 | No-Clipping My Way to Supremacy! | Scarlet | |

=== Video games ===
| Year | Title | Role | Ref. |
|---|---|---|---|
| 2017 | Between the Sky and Sea | Tagirihime/Yasakatomehime, others | |
| 2017 | Genjū Keiyaku Cryptolact | Toire/Emeraude | |
| 2017 | Is It Wrong to Try to Pick Up Girls in a Dungeon?: Memoria Freese | Anna Claes | |
| 2017 | Last Period | Brueghel | |
| 2017 | White Cat Project | Dolly | |
| 2018 | Azur Lane | Mikuma | |
| 2018 | Brown Dust | Barbara | |
| 2018 | Monster Strike | Beast Napoleon, Camphor, Indrajit | |
| 2018 | The Idolmaster Shiny Colors | Sakuya Shirase | |
| 2019 | Gyakuten Othellonia | Lady Citrus | |
| 2020 | Cyberpunk 2077 | Regina Jones, Elizabeth Verales, and others | |
| 2020 | O.N.G.E.K.I. | Setsuna Sumeragi | |
| 2020 | Sakura Kakumei | Sudachi Sana | |
| 2020 | Vivid Army | Amy | |
| 2021 | Company Girls | Liz Aubrugge | |
| 2021 | Loopers | Ritapon | |
| 2021 | Lost Judgment | Akane | |
| 2021 | MapleStory | Kain | |
| 2021 | Monster Hunter Rise | Player Voice | |
| 2021 | Project Mikhail | Misae Munakata | |
| 2021 | Tales of Luminaria | Vanessa Morax | |
| 2021 | Touhou Danmaku Kagura | Toyosatomimi no Miko | |
| 2022 | Heaven Burns Red | Carol Reaper | |
| 2022 | Quiz RPG: The World of Mystic Wiz | Phenex | |
| 2024 | Muv-Luv Dimensions | Misae Munakata | |
| 2026 | Yakuza Kiwami 3 & Dark Ties | Tsubasa | |
| 2026 | Zenless Zone Zero | The Storyteller | |
