= Metal Seinen =

Cultural organization in Pakistan

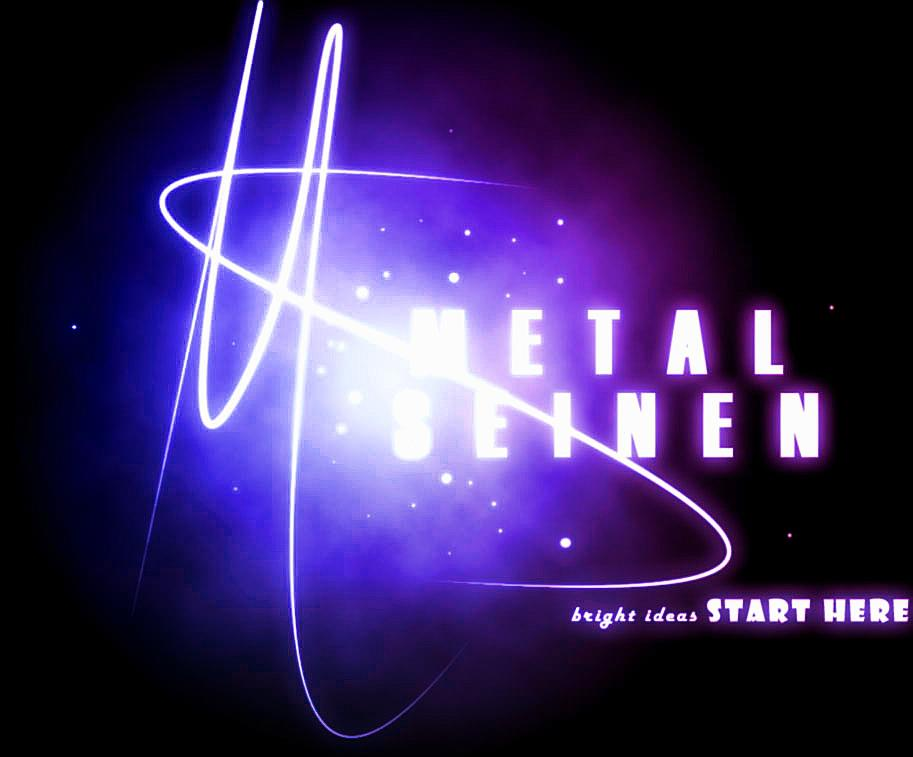
Metal Seinen Logo Revision2

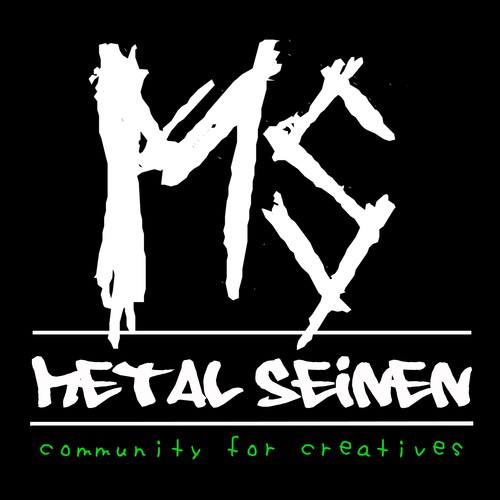
Metal Seinen Logo Revision3

Metal Seinen is a start-up based in Karachi, Pakistan created by Zeeshan Shah in May 2006. The firm provides a social network for people who share an interest in learning about and experiencing international culture.

It provides free and premium plans for artistic collaboration which may lead to opportunities for its members to engage deeply in culture. These ventures currently include digital art, literature, and music. It organizes events and activities for its members, including participation in larger cultural events. The social network is maintained through its online presence and its offline events.

"Metal" is the English word for a strong material and "Seinen" comes from the Japanese word that translates to "youth". The name originally reflected the desire of the founders to differentiate them from the existing diaspora.

== History ==
The members mostly came together by means of non-traditional interests such as anime, gaming, digital art, music and even performance racing. The group was brought together by Zeeshan Shah who is a graduate from Northwestern University.

In May 2006, Zeeshan Shah organized an "anime convention" at the SZABIST Karachi Campus. This convention was the first of its kind in Pakistan and at this time, anime fans generally considered themselves to be quite low in number. This free-for-entry event was the first indication that there were many more anime-fans then anyone expected. It was through the social media network of orkut that many outsiders were able to learn about the event.

The event brought together an audience of 200 to 250 people with diverse interests. Since the event was designed to be a workshop with presentations on the anime industry, artists and hobbyists, it gave people the confidence to speak about their own projects. There were mentions of artworks, literary works and other ventures. After the event, an artist, a musician and a software engineer who shared common interests discussed over tea the feedback of the event. There had been individuals, artists by profession, who had been inspired by the event and wanted to discuss ideas and collaboration for their own ‘manga’. This quest for collaboration displayed a need in the market and thus led to an epiphany for Zeeshan. ‘Metal Seinen’ was born.

== Cultural events ==
=== Anime and manga ===
To-date, Metal Seinen has been the only organizer of events and activities related to manga and anime in Pakistan. It has been responsible from two anime conventions, both held in Karachi, Pakistan in the auditorium of SZABIST. The first anime convention was held on May 20, 2006. The second anime convention, which was held on January 13, 2007, was more distinguished as its details were also published on an international standard newspaper as well as being covered by WCCFTECH. This convention had an event plan, original works and various other activities. Before this convention, the idea of mutual collaboration was already underway. It was also the first display of ReckoningStorm and Eidolon. The first trailer for the comic project of Eidolon was also shown here. The event had anime discussions, presentations, trailers and anime posters. It also featured J-Movies such as Casshern. It was attended by the SZABIST President at the time, Javaid Laghari who complimented the team on the effort.

With Metal Seinen's increasing popularity however, their plans for the next convention changed drastically. Rather than having a simple anime orientated convention, the "Convention of the creatives" was a convention of a much broader spectrum as it not only dealt with current anime affairs but also concerned local music, gaming and avid artists.

=== JapanFest & consulate activities ===
A two-day Japanese festival was held on March 10 and 11 to mark the 60th anniversary of the diplomatic relations between Pakistan and Japan in Karachi, Pakistan. Metal Seinen held drawing sessions led by Lucid Productions, video gaming and anime activities.

Metal Seinen has also arranged presentations at the Japanese Consulate in Karachi, Pakistan. More details can be found at the Facebook fan page. Members from Metal Seinen were also involved in the Jenesys program in 2013. The JENESYS Programme (Japan-East Asia Network of Exchange for Students and Youths) is a project advanced by the Japanese government from the standpoint of providing a sound foundation for strong solidarity within Asia through large-scale youth exchange. In 2014, members of Metal Seinen experienced foreign culture through the program and came back with great personal stories.

=== Workshops and meetups ===
Metal Seinen has held workshops geared more towards the different aspects of foreign culture. A seminar was held on November 7, 2008 at SZABIST, where the aspects of their organization was put forward to the attendees, after which they had a gaming session which included next-generation gaming consoles. Other events have been held at The Second Floor and Cafe Gloria Jean's in Karachi, Pakistan.
