= Tengu Kobou =

Japanese animation studio

- Native name: 天狗工房 / 天狗株式会社
- Romanized name: Tengu Koubou
- Type: Kabushiki gaisha
- Industry: Animation studio
- Founded: February 14, 2013
- Headquarters: Tachikawa, Tokyo, Japan
- Website: ten-gu.com

Tengu Kobou (天狗工房, Tengu Kōbō) is a Japanese animation studio founded in February 2013.

== Productions ==
=== TV series ===
Title	First run start date	First run end date	Episodes	Note(s)
Nazotokine	October 5, 2016	December 21, 2016	12	Original work.
Kaito × Ansa	July 12, 2017	September 27, 2017	12	Original work.
No-Clipping My Way to Supremacy!	2027	TBA	TBA	Based on a light novel series by Nikita Kitagawa. Co-animated with Durandal.
