= List of KonoSuba episodes =

Official logo

KonoSuba: God's Blessing on This Wonderful World! is an anime television series based on the light novel series written by Natsume Akatsuki and illustrated by Kurone Mishima. The series follows the adventures of Kazuma Satou who, after he dies of a heart attack after pushing a girl out of the way of a truck, which turned out to be a tractor, is sent to an RPG-like world, going on various adventures alongside a goddess named Aqua, a magician named Megumin, and a dame named Darkness.

With animation production by Studio Deen, the series was directed by Takaomi Kanasaki and written by Makoto Uezu with character designs by Koichi Kikuta. The first two seasons, respectively aired from January 14 to March 17, 2016, and January 11 to March 16, 2017, adapt the first four volumes of the light novels. The anime series was later followed by the J.C.Staff-produced animated film KonoSuba: God's Blessing on This Wonderful World! Legend of Crimson, which released on August 30, 2019, and adapts the fifth volume.

A third season and an anime series adaptation of the light novel spin-off trilogy An Explosion on This Wonderful World! was announced in May 2022. Both were handled by Drive, which replaced Studio Deen as the series animation producer. An Explosion on This Wonderful World! aired from April 6 to June 22, 2023. The third season aired from April 10 to June 19, 2024, and adapted the sixth and seventh volumes.

A fourth season was announced in January 2026. It will be produced by ENGI and directed by Manabu Kurihara, with Kanasaki returning as chief director. The season is set to premiere in 2027.

== Series overview ==
Season	Episodes	Originally released	
Season	Episodes	First released	Last released
1	10	January 14, 2016	March 17, 2016
2	10	January 12, 2017	March 16, 2017
3	11	April 10, 2024	June 19, 2024

== Episodes ==
=== Season 1 (2016) ===
No. overall	No. in season	Title (Note: English translated titles are taken from Crunchyroll)	Directed by	Written by	Storyboarded by	Original release date	Ref.
1	1	"This Self-Proclaimed Goddess and Reincarnation in Another World!"; Transliteration: "Kono Jishō Megami to Isekai Tensei o!" (Japanese: この自称女神と異世界転生を！)	Shunji Yoshida	Makoto Uezu	Takaomi Kanasaki	January 14, 2016	
2	2	"An Explosion for This Chunibyo!"; Transliteration: "Kono Chūnibyō ni Bakuen o!" (Japanese: この中二病に爆焔を！)	Masato Miyoshi	Aoi Akashiro	Takaomi Kanasaki	January 21, 2016	
3	3	"A Panty Treasure in This Right Hand!"; Transliteration: "Kono Migite ni Pantsu o!" (Japanese: この右手にお宝(ぱんつ)を！)	Hidehiko Kadota	Kōjirō Nakamura	Tetsuhito Saito	January 28, 2016	
4	4	"Explosion Magic for This Formidable Enemy!"; Transliteration: "Kono Kyōteki ni Bakuretsu Mahō o!" (Japanese: この強敵に爆裂魔法を！)	Bob Shirohata	Makoto Uezu	Takayuki Inagaki	February 4, 2016	
5	5	"A Price for This Cursed Sword!"; Transliteration: "Kono Maken ni Onedan o!" (Japanese: この魔剣にお値段を！)	Takatoshi Suzuki	Aoi Akashiro	Takaomi Kanasaki	February 11, 2016	
6	6	"A Conclusion to This Worthless Fight!"; Transliteration: "Kono Rokudemonai Tatakai ni Ketchaku o!" (Japanese: このろくでもない戦いに決着を！)	Shunji Yoshida	Makoto Uezu	Tetsuhito Saito	February 18, 2016	
7	7	"A Second Death in This Freezing Season!"; Transliteration: "Kono Kogoesō na Kisetsu ni Nidome no Shi o!" (Japanese: この凍えそうな季節に二度目の死を！)	Masato Miyoshi	Aoi Akashiro	Masahiro Ise	February 25, 2016	
8	8	"A Loving Hand for Our Party When We Can't Make It Through Winter!"; Transliteration: "Kono Fuyu o Kosenai Ore-tachi ni Ai no Te o!" (Japanese: この冬を越せない俺達に愛の手を！)	Hidehiko Kadota	Kōjirō Nakamura	Takaomi Kanasaki	March 3, 2016	
9	9	"God's Blessing on This Wonderful Shop!"; Transliteration: "Kono Subarashii Mise ni Shukufuku o!" (Japanese: この素晴らしい店に祝福を！)	Tarō Kubo	Aoi Akashiro	Takayuki Inagaki	March 10, 2016	
10	10	"Final Flame for This Over-the-top Fortress!"; Transliteration: "Kono Rifujin na Yōsai ni Shūen o!" (Japanese: この理不尽な要塞に終焔を！)	Shunji Yoshida	Makoto Uezu	Tetsuhito Saito	March 17, 2016	
OVA–1	OVA–1	"God's Blessings on This Wonderful Choker!"; Transliteration: "Kono Subarashii Chōkā ni Shukufuku o!" (Japanese: この素晴らしいチョーカーに祝福を！)	Yasuo Iwamoto (Note: Production staff information is taken from the ending credits of the OVA)	Aoi Akashiro	Takaomi Kanasaki	June 24, 2016	

=== Season 2 (2017) ===
No. overall	No. in season	Title	Directed by	Written by	Storyboarded by	Original release date	Ref.
11	1	"Give Me Deliverance From This Judicial Injustice!"; Transliteration: "Kono Futō na Saiban ni Kyūen o!" (Japanese: この不当な裁判に救援を！)	Yasuo Iwamoto	Makoto Uezu	Takaomi Kanasaki	January 12, 2017	
12	2	"A Friend for This Crimson Demon Girl!"; Transliteration: "Kono Kōma no Musume ni Yūjin o!" (Japanese: この紅魔の娘に友人を！)	Yasuyuki Ebara	Makoto Uezu	Takaomi Kanasaki	January 19, 2017	
13	3	"Peace for the Master of This Labyrinth!"; Transliteration: "Kono Meikyū no Aruji ni Yasuragi o!" (Japanese: この迷宮の主に安らぎを！)	Shunji Yoshida	Makoto Uezu	Takaomi Kanasaki	January 26, 2017	
14	4	"A Betrothed for This Noble Daughter!"; Transliteration: "Kono Kizoku no Reijō ni Ryōen o!" (Japanese: この貴族の令嬢に良縁を！)	Tarō Kubo	Kōjirō Nakamura	Takaomi Kanasaki	February 2, 2017	
15	5	"Servitude for This Masked Knight!"; Transliteration: "Kono Kamen no Kishi ni Reizoku o!" (Japanese: この仮面の騎士に隷属を！)	Shunji Yoshida	Touko Machida	Takaomi Kanasaki	February 9, 2017	
16	6	"Goodbye to This Irritating Living World!"; Transliteration: "Kono Wazurawashī Gaikai ni Sayonara o!" (Japanese: この煩わしい外界にさよならを！)	Yasuyuki Ebara	Kōjirō Nakamura	Yasuyuki Ebara	February 16, 2017	
17	7	"An Invitation for This Knucklehead!"; Transliteration: "Kono Futebuteshī Namakura ni Shōtai o!" (Japanese: このふてぶてしい鈍(なまくら)に招待を！)	Takatoshi Suzuki & Shunji Yoshida	Touko Machida	Rebun Koiwai	February 23, 2017	
18	8	"Sightseeing in This Pitiful City!"; Transliteration: "Kono Itaitashī Machi de Kankō o!" (Japanese: この痛々しい街で観光を！)	Yasuo Iwamoto	Kōjirō Nakamura	Takaomi Kanasaki	March 2, 2017	
19	9	"A Goddess for This Corrupt Hot Springs Town!"; Transliteration: "Kono Fujō na Onsengai ni Megami o!" (Japanese: この不浄な温泉街に女神を！)	Atsushi Nakayama	Makoto Uezu	Takaomi Kanasaki	March 9, 2017	
20	10	"God's Blessing on This Wonderful Party!"; Transliteration: "Kono Subarashii Nakama-tachi ni Shukufuku o!" (Japanese: この素晴らしい仲間たちに祝福を！)	Shunji Yoshida	Makoto Uezu	Takaomi Kanasaki & Tetsuhito Saito	March 16, 2017	
OVA–2	OVA–1	"God's Blessings on These Wonderful Works of Art!"; Transliteration: "Kono Subarashii Geijutsu ni Shukufuku wo!" (Japanese: この素晴らしい芸術に祝福を！)	Shunji Yoshida	Touko Machida	Takaomi Kanasaki	July 24, 2017	

=== Season 3 (2024) ===
No. overall	No. in season	Title	Directed by	Written by	Storyboarded by	Original release date	Ref.
Season 3
21	1	"God's Blessings on This Bright Future!"; Transliteration: "Kono Akarui Mirai ni Shukuhai o!" (Japanese: この明るい未来に祝杯を！)	Ōri Yasukawa	Takaomi Kanasaki	Takaomi Kanasaki	April 10, 2024	
22	2	"A Smile for This Dour Girl!"; Transliteration: "Kono Warawanai Shōjo ni Hohoemi o!" (Japanese: この笑わない少女に微笑みを！)	Shinya Kawabe	Makoto Uezu	Takaomi Kanasaki	April 17, 2024	
23	3	"A Re-education for This Bright Little Girl!"; Transliteration: "Kono Sakashī Shōjo ni Saikyōiku o!" (Japanese: この賢しい少女に再教育を！)	Yasuo Iwamoto	Takaomi Kanasaki	Takaomi Kanasaki	April 24, 2024	
24	4	"Divine Punishment for This Handsome Gentleman Thief!"; Transliteration: "Kono Ikemen Gizoku ni Tenchū o!" (Japanese: このイケメン義賊に天誅を！)	Ōri Yasukawa	Makoto Uezu	Yujiro Abe	May 1, 2024	
25	5	"Nefarious Friends for This Sheltered Princess!"; Transliteration: "Kono Hakoiri Ōjo ni Akuyū o!" (Japanese: この箱入り王女に悪友を！)	Shunji Yoshida	Takaomi Kanasaki	Takaomi Kanasaki	May 8, 2024	
26	6	"A Farewell to This Lavish Lifestyle!"; Transliteration: "Kono Suteki na Kurashi ni Sayonara o!" (Japanese: この素敵な暮らしにさよならを！)	Shinsuke Gomi	Makoto Uezu	Yang Lie-Chun	May 15, 2024	
27	7	"Rest for This Up-And-Coming Adventurer!"; Transliteration: "Kono Nariagari Bōken-sha ni mo Ansoku o!" (Japanese: この成り上がり冒険者にも安息を！)	Akira Yamada	Takaomi Kanasaki	Takaomi Kanasaki	May 22, 2024	
28	8	"Rest for the Master of This Lake!"; Transliteration: "Kono Mizūmi no Omo ni Eien no Nemuri o!" (Japanese: この湖の主に永遠の眠りを！)	Shunji Yoshida	Makoto Uezu	Takayuki Inagaki	May 29, 2024	
29	9	"A Talking-To for This Runaway!"; Transliteration: "Kono Iede Musume ni Sekkyō o!" (Japanese: この家出娘に説教を！)	Ōri Yasukawa	Takaomi Kanasaki	Takaomi Kanasaki	June 5, 2024	
30	10	"Blessings for This Selfish Bride!"; Transliteration: "Kono Migattena Hanayome ni Shukufuku o!" (Japanese: この身勝手な花嫁に祝福を！)	Yasuo Iwamoto	Makoto Uezu	Takayuki Inagaki	June 12, 2024	
31	11	"God's Blessings for These Unchanging Days!"; Transliteration: "Kono Kawaranai Nichijō ni Shukufuku o!" (Japanese: この変わらない日常に祝福を！)	Shinya Kawabe	Takaomi Kanasaki	Takaomi Kanasaki & Tetsuhito Saito	June 19, 2024	
Bonus Stage
OVA–3	OVA–1	"Red Stream Explosion!"; Transliteration: "Reddo Sutorīmu Ekusupuroōjon!" (Japanese: レッドストリーム・エクスプロージョン！)	Manganji Chika	Takaomi Kanasaki	Takaomi Kanasaki	March 14, 2025 (theatrical); April 25, 2025 (BD/DVD)	
OVA–4	OVA–2	"Beware of Fakes!"; Transliteration: "Nisemono Chūi!" (Japanese: 偽者注意！)	Shunji Yoshida	Takaomi Kanasaki	Takaomi Kanasaki	March 14, 2025 (theatrical); April 25, 2025 (BD/DVD)	

== Spin-off ==
=== An Explosion on This Wonderful World! (2023) ===
No.	Title (Note: English translated titles are taken from Crunchyroll.)	Directed by	Written by	Original release date	Ref.
1	"The Crimson-Eyed Wizards"; Transliteration: "Akai Hitomi no Wizāzu" (Japanese: 紅い瞳の魔法使い達(ウィザーズ))	Ōri Yasukawa	Makoto Uezu	April 6, 2023	
2	"The Magic Academy's Taboo"; Transliteration: "Mahō Gakkō no Tabū" (Japanese: 魔法学校の禁忌(タブー))	Akira Koremoto	Yasuko Aoki	April 13, 2023	
3	"Guardians of the Crimson Demon Village"; Transliteration: "Kōma no Sato no Gādianzu" (Japanese: 紅魔の里の守護者達(ガーディアンズ))	Takahiro Tanaka	Satoko Sekine	April 20, 2023	
4	"The Crimson-Eyed Lonely Master"; Transliteration: "Akai Hitomi no Ronrī Masutā" (Japanese: 紅い瞳の孤高の少女(ロンリーマスター))	Yuki Watanabe	Touko Machida	April 27, 2023	
5	"Prelude to an Explosion of Madness"; Transliteration: "Bakuretsu-kyō no Pureryūdo" (Japanese: 爆裂狂の誕生(プレリュード))	Shunji Yoshida	Makoto Uezu	May 4, 2023	
6	"The Raison D'être of an Explosive NEET"; Transliteration: "Bakuretsu Nīto no Rezondētoru" (Japanese: 爆裂ニートの就職活動(レゾンデートル))	Yuki Kanazawa	Yasuko Aoki	May 11, 2023	
7	"Troublemakers of the City of Water"; Transliteration: "Mizu no Miyako no Toraburumēkā" (Japanese: 水の都の迷惑教団(トラブルメーカー))	Ōri Yasukawa	Touko Machida	May 18, 2023	
8	"Fanatics of the Water City"; Transliteration: "Mizu no Miyako no Fanatikku" (Japanese: 水の都の狂信者達(ファナティック))	Shigeki Awai	Makoto Uezu	May 25, 2023	
9	"Destroyer from the Crimson Demon Village"; Transliteration: "Kōma no Sato kara no Desutoroiyā" (Japanese: 紅魔の里からの来訪者(デストロイヤー))	Shunji Yoshida	Yasuko Aoki	June 1, 2023	
10	"Outlaws of the Town for Beginners"; Transliteration: "Kakedashi no Machi no Autorō" (Japanese: 駆け出しの街の冒険者達(アウトロー))	Yuki Watanabe	Satoko Sekine	June 8, 2023	
11	"The Explosion Girl and the Forest Irregularity"; Transliteration: "Bakuretsu Musume to Mori no Iregyurā" (Japanese: 名物(ばくれつ)娘と森の悪魔(イレギュラー))	Shin'ya Kawabe	Touko Machida	June 15, 2023	
12	"An Explosion on This Wonderful World!"; Transliteration: "Kono Subarashii Sekai ni Ekusupurōjon o!" (Japanese: この素晴らしい世界に爆焔(エクスプロージョン)を！)	Ōri Yasukawa	Makoto Uezu	June 22, 2023	
