= Sasaki and Miyano: Graduation =

2023 film by Shinji Ishihira

- Theatrical release poster
- Kanji: 映画「佐々木と宮野 ー卒業編ー」
- Revised Hepburn: Eiga Sasaki to Miyano: Sotsugyō-hen
- Directed by: Shinji Ishihira
- Screenplay by: Yoshiko Nakamura
- Based on: Sasaki and Miyano by Shō Harusono
- Starring: Soma Saito; Yusuke Shirai
- Cinematography: Daisuke Horino
- Edited by: Akane Shiraishi
- Music by: Kana Shibue
- Production company: Studio Deen
- Distributed by: Kadokawa
- Release date: February 17, 2023
- Running time: 59 minutes
- Country: Japan
- Language: Japanese

Sasaki and Miyano: Graduation (Japanese: 映画「佐々木と宮野 ー卒業編ー」, Hepburn: Eiga Sasaki to Miyano: Sotsugyō-hen) is a 2023 Japanese animated romance film directed by Shinji Ishihira and written by Yoshiko Nakamura based on the Sasaki and Miyano manga series by Shō Harusono. Produced by Studio Deen and distributed by Kadokawa, the film stars the voices of Soma Saito and Yusuke Shirai. Graduation was released in Japan on February 17, 2023 as a double feature with Hirano and Kagiura short film.

Crunchyroll licensed the film, and screenings were held at Sakura-Con and Anime Central on April 7, before premiering online on September 28, 2023.

== Synopsis ==
Shūmei Sasaki and Yoshikazu Miyano embark upon the next stage of their relationship as a couple.

== Voice cast ==
- Soma Saito as Yoshikazu Miyano
- Yusuke Shirai as Shūmei Sasaki
- Yoshitsugu Matsuoka as Taiga Hirano
- Nobunaga Shimazaki as Akira Kagiura
- Yūki Ono as Jirō Ogasawara
- Yuma Uchida as Masato Hanazawa
- Ryōhei Arai as Tasuku Kuresawa
- Mitsuhiro Ichiki as Gonsaburō Tashiro

== Production ==
In March 2022, it was announced that Shō Harusono's Sasaki and Miyano manga will receive a new anime after the anime series aired its final episode. On July of that year, it was announced that it will be an anime film, with key staff and cast members returning to their respective positions from the television series for the film; Shinji Ishihira directing the film at Studio Deen, screenplay by Yoshiko Nakamura, character designed by Maki Fujii, and music composed by Kana Shibue. The theme song for the film is "March", sung by Miracle Chimpanzee band.

== Release ==
The film was released in theaters in Japan on February 17, 2023 as a double feature with a short film, Hirano and Kagiura. Crunchyroll licensed the film, and screenings were held at Sakura-Con and Anime Central on April 7, before premiering online on September 28, 2023.

== Reception ==
=== Box office ===
The film failed to make it into top 10 in the Japanese box office overall.

=== Critical reception ===
Nicholas Dupree of Anime News Network gave the film A− rating, and stated "While the manga is ongoing, Graduation feels like a farewell, using its final moments to reminisce about our main couple's romantic journey as they walk the halls of their school one last time."
