= Ball Guy =

Pokémon character

- Pokémon character
- Ball Guy in Pokémon Masters EX
- First appearance: Pokémon Sword and Shield (2019)
- Voiced by: Tomokazu Seki; Kellen Goff

Ball Guy is a character in the 2019 video games Pokémon Sword and Shield. He is an in-game mascot character who represents the Pokémon League, cheering on participants and giving gifts to them while wearing a large helmet designed after a Poké Ball with a smiling face on it. He also appears in Pokémon Masters EX, where he is voiced by Tomokazu Seki and Kellen Goff in Japanese and English respectively. He has also been used as part of various promotions for different Pokémon games as well. He has received generally positive reception and became popular with Pokémon fans. Critics considered him an enjoyable character in the games, though he was also identified as a creepy character by multiple critics.

== Concept and creation ==
Developed by Game Freak and published by Nintendo, the Pokémon franchise began in Japan in 1996 with the release of the video games Pokémon Red and Blue for the Game Boy. In these games, the player assumes the role of a Pokémon Trainer whose goal is to capture and train creatures called Pokémon. Players use the creatures' special abilities to combat other Pokémon, both in the wild as well as those used by other Trainers. Created for the 2019 games Pokémon Sword and Shield, Ball Guy is the in-game mascot of the Galar Pokémon League, appearing outside of different gyms in the region to root on trainers and give gifts. He wears a red shirt, dark grey shorts, and a helmet designed to resemble a Poké Ball with a pair of eyes, a smile, and a tuft of hair. He is voiced by Tomokazu Seki in Japanese and Kellen Goff in English.

== Appearances ==
Ball Guy appeared in the video games Pokémon Sword and Shield, where he serves as the mascot of the Galar Pokémon League. He gives out various gifts, including some gifts for participating in the Pokémon League Championship. Various in-game rewards based on Ball Guy, including a t-shirt with Ball Guy and a blue variant designed after an item called the Great Ball, were rewarded for participation in in-game tournaments. In Pokémon Scarlet and Violet's downloadable content The Indigo Disk, the player can obtain a helmet depicting Ball Guy on it. In Pokémon Go, a costume based on Ball Guy can be acquired for use by the players' characters. Ball Guy appears as a playable character in Pokémon Masters EX, accompanied by the Pokémon Amoonguss.

The official Twitter accounts were rebranded to feature Ball Guy temporarily in both English and Japanese, promoting a challenge to use a hashtag enough to earn in-game rewards in Sword and Shield. As part of the promotion for Pokémon Legends Arceus, Ball Guy was featured on its official website, spreading Poké Balls across the page. Mangaka Bkub Okawa released a series of Pokémon Line stickers, including one depicting Ball Guy. A card featuring the Ball Guy was created for the Pokémon Trading Card Game. He appeared in the series Pokémon Evolutions, as well as Pokémon: Twilight Wings, which includes a scene where his mask is off and the back of his head can be seen. Ball Guy has received multiple pieces of merchandise, including a capsule toy depicting him sitting and a posable plush toy.

== Critical reception ==
Since his appearance in Sword and Shield, Ball Guy has been a popular character for fans. The Gamer writer Stacey Henley called him the games' best character, suggesting the sequels, Pokemon Scarlet and Violet, need a character as iconic as him. She argued that Ball Guy helped represent Galar's culture, which she contended was built in part around British sports culture. She stated that, while Ball Guy was more akin to American sports culture's feelings on mascots, he felt at home in the British-inspired Galar, and helped give soul to the gym challenges. Polygon writer Patricia Hernandez praised Ball Guy, saying that she was instantly infatuated with him the moment she saw him. She felt that his earnest interest in the things he likes was an endearing trait, commenting on the rate of people finding him creepy by pointing out that he was a normal person by the standards of the Pokemon series. Inside Games writer Sawadee Otsuka noted that Ball Guy's tendency to end his statements with "ボル" (bol) made an impact on players. While discussing his appearance in Pokemon Masters EX, Otsuka noted that it had a balance of comical elements, but his voice, which he describes as handsome, created a sense of gap moe (a term referring to a character with traits or actions that contradict how they normally are).

GameSpot writer Kallie Plagge noted that, while she initially found him enjoyable during her main playthrough of Sword and Shield, expressing frustration with how distribution of rewards by Ball Guy was handled, particularly with the Flame Orb. She felt that his mock crying made it more irritating when he ultimately gave the player a worthless prize, requiring them to do a tournament again to try to get the prize she wanted. Tobe Mamiya noted a negative response by fans due to the limited access to the Flame Orb item through Ball Guy. Eurogamer writer Imogen Beckhelling found him "lovely", citing his dancing and how he cheers the player on as they progress, noting that the Internet had "fallen in love with him." Despite her enjoyment of these aspects, she found the nature of Ball Guy disconcerting, particularly what exactly he is. She noted that, while he seems like he's wearing a costume, the definition of his figure suggests otherwise. ITmedia writer Tobe Mamiya called him one of the funniest characters in the series Kotaku writer Natalie Degraffinried felt that the premise of Ball Guy, regardless of his earnestness, was nevertheless promoting a product in the world of Pokemon, also discussing particular issues that Pokemon species face in the world of Galar, such as Corsola dying.
