= Kellen Goff =

American voice actor (born 1995)

- Goff in 2026
- Born: Kellen Alexander Goff; February 3, 1995 (age 31); Torrance, California, U.S.
- Occupation: Voice actor
- Years active: 2007–present
- Website: kellengoff.com

Kellen Alexander Goff (born February 3, 1995) is an American voice actor. His work spans video games, English-language dubs of anime, animated television series, and live-action films. He is most well known for his work in the Five Nights at Freddy's media franchise, voicing characters including Glamrock Freddy, Funtime Freddy, Sun and Moon, and Foxy the Pirate. He first portrayed Foxy in the 2023 film Five Nights at Freddy's before later voicing the character in the video games. He also portrayed Toy Freddy in the 2025 film Five Nights at Freddy's 2. A significant portion of his work has involved providing voices and vocal effects for animals and creatures.

His other roles include Carnage in Marvel Tōkon: Fighting Souls, Overhaul / Kai Chisaki in My Hero Academia, Diavolo in JoJo's Bizarre Adventure: Golden Wind, Sasaki in Sasaki and Miyano, Fiddlesticks in League of Legends, Porco Galliard / The Jaw Titan in Attack on Titan, Wingman in Valorant, Wind Archer Cookie and Schwarzwälder in Cookie Run: Kingdom, Zagred in Black Clover, Roy in Sr Pelo's Spooky Month, and Bezel in Chikn Nuggit.

== Early life ==
Goff was born in Torrance, California, to Jewish-American parents Randy and Roger Goff. Goff is the oldest of two children and was diagnosed with autism at age 16.

== Career ==
Goff began training in animation voiceover with Bob Bergen, as Bergen's youngest student at the time and the first minor to take his course. From there, he went on to be taught by such names as Richard Horvitz, Charlie Adler, Debi Derryberry, and Mick Wingert.

Goff provided his voice for a number of online animation and video game projects, slowly moving to working in mainstream media.

In the fall of 2016, Goff joined the cast of Five Nights at Freddy's as the role of Funtime Freddy in Five Nights at Freddy's: Sister Location, the fifth installment of the series. This was the first mainline game to feature full voice acting, marking Goff as the first to voice a mainline incarnation of Freddy Fazbear, albeit a variant. Goff would go on to be cast as Molten Freddy in Freddy Fazbear's Pizzeria Simulator; Fredbear in Ultimate Custom Night; Glamrock Freddy, Sun, and Moon in Five Nights at Freddy's: Security Breach; Foxy the Pirate in Five Nights at Freddy's (film); the player character Arnold and others in Five Nights at Freddy's: Secret of the Mimic; and most recently Toy Freddy in Five Nights at Freddy's 2 (film).

He has also cast ADR for multiple films, such as F the Prom, Traces, and Near Extinction: Shangri-La.

Goff is a member of The Ink Tank, primarily creating content for their YouTube channel and writing lore for their wiki. Since joining the team in 2021, he has appeared in multiple videos for the channel and voiced various characters, some of which are his creations. He is the casting director for the web series 5 Years Later, along with voicing characters for the series and editing audio.

On June 26, 2026, Goff revealed that Youtooz had created a figure of him as part of their Five Nights at Freddy's collection. This makes him the second voice actor to receive a Youtooz vinyl figure depicting their real-life persona, following Alanah Pearce.

== Personal life ==
Goff is bisexual.

== Filmography ==
=== Animation ===
List of English dubbing performances in animation
Year	Title	Role	Notes	Source
2017	Blue Exorcist: Kyoto Saga	Masato Chigusa		
2017	March Comes in Like a Lion	Morio Shigeta		
2017	Berserk	Kushan Leader		
2018	JoJo's Bizarre Adventure: Diamond Is Unbreakable	Mansaku Nijimura		
2018	Sword Art Online Alternative Gun Gale Online	Peter, Lax		
2018	Cells at Work!	Sympathetic Nerve Cell Captain, Additional Voices		
2018–26	My Hero Academia	Kai Chisaki / Overhaul		
2019	Sword Art Online: Alicization	Brigg, Kosogi		
2019	Mob Psycho 100	Tamaki		
2019	YooHoo to the Rescue	Stompee		
2019	One-Punch Man	Gouketsu		
2019	No Guns Life	Father		
2019	African Office Worker	Sea Lion Bartender		
2019	The Seven Deadly Sins: Wrath of the Gods	Calmadios		
2019	The Disastrous Life of Saiki K.	Reita Toritsuka	Reawakened Netflix dub	
2019–26	Fire Force	Rekka Hoshimiya		
2020	Black Clover	Zagred (Kotodama Devil)		
2020	Beyblade Burst Rise	Kaio Koryu	Ep. 1	
2020	Demon Slayer: Kimetsu no Yaiba	Spider Demon (Father)		
2020	JoJo's Bizarre Adventure: Golden Wind	Diavolo, King Crimson	Main role	
2020	Seven Deadly Sins	Calmadios		
2020	Re:Zero − Starting Life in Another World	Kenichi Natsuki		
2020	Miraculous World: New York – United HeroeZ	Mike Rochip, Techno-Pirate, Hot Dog Dan		
2020	Yashahime: Princess Half-Demon	Root Head		
2020	That Time I Got Reincarnated as a Slime	Ukya		
2020	Appare-Ranman!	Pistol		
2020	One Piece	Blue Gilly, Shishilian		
2020	Akudama Drive	Hoodlum	Main role	
2020–26	Welcome to Demon School! Iruma-kun	Amaymon, School Bell, Ifrit, Guardian, Sabnock's Father		
2020–24	KonoSuba	Hans, Chakamiya, Heidel, Sensitive Thug		
2020–25	Our Last Crusade or the Rise of a New World	Lord Mask		
2021	High-Rise Invasion	Chef Mask	Netflix English dub	
2021	Beastars	Free	Season 2; Netflix English dub	
2021	Moriarty the Patriot	Eddie Hawthorne		
2021	Pokémon Master Journeys: The Series	Arctozolt, Bray Zenn		
2021	How a Realist Hero Rebuilt the Kingdom	Halbert Magna		
2021	Hortensia Saga	King Alexander De Hortensia, narrator	Anime English dub	
2021	Lupin III: Prison of the Past	Dynamite Joe		
2021	Edens Zero	Highway Ena, Fuzaiten Baku, Diego Reyes, Metal Bogey, Yak	Netflix English dub	
2021	Super Crooks	Tommy Eggleston	Netflix English dub	
2021	The Case Study of Vanitas	Prédateur		
2021	The Detective Is Already Dead	Chameleon		
2021–22	Attack on Titan	Porco Galliard / The Jaw Titan		
2021–25	Record of Ragnarok	Heimdall	Netflix English dub	
2022	Sasaki and Miyano	Sasaki	Main role	
2022	Flying Phantom Ship	Jack		
2022	Given	Koji Yatake		
2022	The Prince of Tennis II	A. Frankensteiner	U-17 World Cup dub	
2022	Battle Athletes Victory ReSTART!	Oshinoke		
2022	Romantic Killer	Hijiri Koganei	Netflix English dub	
2023	Vinland Saga	Rat, Eadric's Son	Netflix English dub	
2023	Jujutsu Kaisen	Toshihisa Negi	Season 2	
2024	Reborn!	Superbia Squalo	Discotek Media dub	
2024–26	The Elusive Samurai	Ogasawara Sadamune		
2024	Tower of God	Novick, Po Bidau Gustang	Season 2	
2025	Übel Blatt	Marquis Glenn	Amazon English dub, Main role	
2025	Yaiba: Samurai Legend	Kagetora	Netflix English dub	
2025	Sasaki and Miyano: Graduation	Sasaki	Main role	
2025	Panty & Stocking with Garterbelt	Duelist Ghost	Season 2	
2025	Secrets of the Silent Witch	Cyril Ashley		
2025	Disney Twisted-Wonderland the Animation	Floyd Leech		
2026	Digimon Beatbreak	Astamon, Raremon, Hikita Hajime, Fumamon		
2026	Needy Girl Overdose	Narrator, Otaku		
2026	Snowball Earth	Isseki Sagami	Main Role	
2026	Akane-banashi	Karashi Nerimaya	Netflix English dub	
2026	Witch Hat Atelier	Sasaran		
2026	Given the Movie: To The Sea	Koji Yatake		
2026	Black Torch	Shinji Kirihara, Huge Mononoke		
2026	Witch Arc	Levi	Main Role	

List of voice performances in prelay TV animation
Year	Title	Role	Notes	Source
2015	Like, Share, Die	Various		
2022–present	The Wingfeather Saga	Slarb, Brak, Yurgen, General Khrak		
2024–25	The Simpsons	Fairy Tale Characters, Playground Kids, Ship Captains, Screaming Friends	Season 36: Ep. 6 (2024), Ep. 18 (2025)	
2025	Your Friendly Neighborhood Spider-Man	Symbiotic Alien, Vincent Patilio		
2026	X-Men '97	Puck, Additional Voices	Season 2	

=== Film ===
List of voice performances in films
Year	Title	Role	Notes	Source
2016	The Swan Princess: Princess Tomorrow, Pirate Today!	Nums, Rufus		
2016	Rock Dog	Rock Show Announcer		
2018	The Swan Princess: A Royal Myztery	Nums, Hunch	As "Tobias Booker"	
2019	Hunter × Hunter: The Last Mission	Gama	English dub	
2019	Playmobil: The Movie	Salty		
2019	SamSam	Mucky Yuck, Gloomyglob Monster, Wettabeds		
2021	KonoSuba: God's Blessing on this Wonderful World! Legend of Crimson	Hans, Chakamiya	English dub	
2021	The Night Is Short, Walk On Girl	Senpai	Main Role, English dub	
2021	Pokémon the Movie: Secrets of the Jungle	Elder Zarude	English Netflix Dub	
2022	Shin Ultraman	Zarab	English dub	
2023	Five Nights at Freddy's	Foxy		
2024	Kingdom of the Planet of the Apes	Voice Performer	Vocals for Silva	
2024	Wicked	Voice Performer	Additional voices	
2025	Elio	Voice Performer	Additional voices	
2025	Ultraman: The Adventure Begins	Ultraman Scott, Scott Masterson	Blu-Ray Dub	
2025	In Your Dreams	Sandling 2		
2025	Five Nights at Freddy's 2	Toy Freddy, Foxy		
2026	Masters of the Universe	Voice Performer	Voice of Goat Man	
2026	Resident Evil	Puker, Additional Voices		

=== Video games ===
List of voice performances in video games
Year	Title	Role	Notes	Source
2010	Star Trek Online	V.S. T'Pau Security Guard, Bar Patron, I.K.S. Sarpek Klingon Captain		
2010	Heroes of Newerth	Ichor, Si Ma Yi, Blade of Blackwal, Plushie Behemoth, Incubus Succubus, Masked Monkey King		
2013	Warframe	Nox, Tusk Grineer		
2014	Family Guy: The Quest for Stuff	Monkey Kong		
2016	Five Nights at Freddy's: Sister Location	Funtime Freddy		
2016	Orcs Must Die! Unchained	Headhunter Guardian		
2016	Fe	Various		
2016	Warhammer 40,000: Inquisitor – Martyr	Renegade Sergeant, Large Enemy, Medium Enemy		
2017	Marvel Avengers Academy	Bruce Banner	Bruce Banner was added to the game in 2017.	
2017	A Hat in Time	Snatcher's Minions		
2017	Freddy Fazbear's Pizzeria Simulator	Molten Freddy		
2018	Fallen Legion	Aurelius	Rise to Glory expansion	
2018	The Bard's Tale IV: Barrows Deep	Magic Mouth		
2018	Ultimate Custom Night	Molten Freddy, Fredbear		
2019	MapleStory	Melange	English dub	
2019	Smite	Jormungandr, Freaky Tiki Ah Puch, Inu Gami Fenrir, Infernal King Zeus, Brimstone Cerberus, Deathbringer King Arthur		
2019	Game of Thrones: Winter is Coming	Robert Hunt, Soren	English dub	
2019	Mr Love: Queen's Choice	Eli	English dub	
2019	Crystar	Kyosuke Tamasu	English dub	
2019	Five Nights at Freddy's: Help Wanted	Funtime Freddy, Freddy Fazbear	Freddy Fazbear lines go unused	
2019	UglyDolls: An Imperfect Adventure	Lucky Bat		
2019	Shenmue III	Gao Mumu, Wan Xiuxun, Han Shuaiwei	English dub	
2020	Genshin Impact	Fu San'er, Abyss Herald: Wicked Torrents	English dub	
2020	League of Legends	Fiddlesticks		
2020	One-Punch Man: A Hero Nobody Knows	Melzargard	English dub	
2020	My Hero One's Justice 2	Kai Chisaki / Overhaul	English dub	
2020	The Last of Us Part II	Infected voices - Bloaters		
2020	Wasteland 3	Downtown Marshal, Jesse Cotter		
2020	Final Fantasy: Crystal Chronicles Remastered	Bessamzan, Donny Marce	English dub	
2020	Hearthstone	Cairne Bloodhoof, King Terenas, Thrall	For Thrall, substitutes for Chris Metzen in Scholomance Academy and Madness at the Darkmoon Faire expansions.	
2020	Transformers: Battlegrounds	Hyperdrive, Decepticon Scout Male 1, Decepticon Brawler Male 1		
2020	Demon's Souls	Old Hero, Dreglings, Giant Depraved Ones		
2020	World of Warcraft: Shadowlands	Gorduk, Guardian Molan, Vorkai Officers, Maldraxxus Spies, Quilboars		
2020–24	The Elder Scrolls Online	Hezehk, Xyn, Planar Purveyor, Sunel Tharyon, Fothxura, Bittding, Nuxul, Reachmen bards		
2021	Monster Hunter: Rise	Player Voice Type 10, Hoshibara the Sailor	English dub	
2021	Cookie Run: Kingdom	Wind Archer Cookie, Schwarzwälder (Choco Werehound Brute), Bassist Cookie	English dub	
2021	Shin Megami Tensei V	Lahmu	English dub	
2021	Demon Slayer: Kimetsu no Yaiba – The Hinokami Chronicles	Spider Demon (Father)	English dub	
2021	Five Nights at Freddy's: Security Breach	Glamrock Freddy, Sun, Moon		
2021	Fire Emblem Heroes	Volke	English dub	
2021	Five Nights at Freddy's AR: Special Delivery	Funtime Freddy		
2021	Lost Judgment	Sakaki	English dub	
2022	Paladins	Dark Drake Azaan		
2022	Lost Ark	Belmorok, Ganarok, Seto, Jave, Igor, Tobai, Ugo, Soltaris, Seville, Kradott, Monahan, Howan, Gnosis, Warden Tarliel, Colton, Mervin, Meman, Rito	English dub	
2022	Black Desert Online	Floki	English dub	
2022	Evil Dead: The Game	Deadite, Eligos, Demi-Eligos		
2022	Eternal Return	Markus	English dub	
2022	Saints Row	Josh		
2022	Ghostbusters: Spirits Unleashed	Basher, Citizen		
2022	God of War Ragnarök	Raider Stag		
2022	The Callisto Protocol	Grunt-Class Biophage		
2022	Dead Space	Guardian, Slasher		
2023	VALORANT	Wingman		
2023	Mato Anomalies	Johnson Chen, Dockman A, Researcher	English dub	In-game credits
2023	Octopath Traveler II	Additional voices	English dub	
2023	Loop8: Summer of Gods	Additional voices	English dub	
2023	Minecraft Legends	The Beast, Seeker, Pigmadillo		
2023	Street Fighter 6	Oscar	English dub	
2023	Pokémon Masters EX	Ball Guy	English dub	
2023	Like a Dragon Gaiden: The Man Who Erased His Name	Additional voices	English dub	
2023	Five Nights at Freddy's: Security Breach Ruin DLC	Sun, Moon, Eclipse		
2023	Remnant 2	Pan Cultists, Root Zombies		
2023	Lords of the Fallen	Tancred, Master of Castigations, Reinhold the Immured		
2023	Warcraft Rumble	Cairne Bloodhoof, Bloodmage Thalnos, Marshal Redpaw, Goblin Sappers		
2023	Lego Fortnite	Enemy NPCS		
2023	Five Nights at Freddy's: Help Wanted 2	Funtime Freddy, Glamrock Freddy, Sun, Moon		
2024	Diablo IV	Malphas		
2024	Suicide Squad: Kill the Justice League	Corrupted Elite		
2024	CookieRun: Witch's Castle	Sheriff Whiskerton, Grandpa Doorstache, Cheesemaster	English dub	
2024	Fallout 76	Dimples the Clown, Ghouls	"America's Playground" expansion	
2024	My Hero Ultra Rumble	Kai Chisaki / Overhaul	English dub	
2024	Shin Megami Tensei V: Vengeance	Lahmu	English dub	
2024	Funko Fusion	Freddy Fazbear, Foxy		
2024	Tower of God: New World	Varagarv, Khun Marco Asensio	English dub	
2024	Ys X: Nordics	Fisherman Morris, Village Chief Isaac, Dødsklovn, Young Man	English dub	
2024	Dragon Age: The Veilguard	Additional voices		
2024	Slitterhead	Creatures	English dub	
2025	Like a Dragon: Pirate Yakuza in Hawaii	Additional voices	English dub	
2025	Phantom Brave: The Lost Hero	Navy	English dub	
2025	Lunar Remastered Collection	Zophar	English dub	
2025	PaperKlay	Blinky		
2025	Dune: Awakening	Soha Sirrendrin, Tamzin Flaxenraad		
2025	Five Nights at Freddy's: Secret of the Mimic	Arnold, Shroom, Puppet Foxy, Additional Voices		
2025	Shadowverse: Worlds Beyond	Mugen, Steel-Bodied Honesty; Ruler of Cocytus; Zahar, Stormwave Dragoon; Darkseal Demon; Supplicant of Unkilling; Goblin Foray	English dub	
2025	My Hero Academia: All's Justice	Kai Chisaki / Overhaul	English dub	
2026	Granblue Fantasy: Relink - Endless Ragnarok	The World	English dub	
2026	Marvel Tokon: Fighting Souls	Carnage	English dub	
2026	Dragon Ball: Sparking! Zero	Master Roshi	"Super Limit Breaking NEO" Expansion	
2026	Castlevania: Belmont's Curse	Talos, Arthur	English dub	
2026	Cookie Run: OvenSmash	Wind Archer Cookie	English dub	
2026	Terrible Lizards	Jordan		

=== Web series ===
List of voice performances in web series
Year	Title	Role	Notes	Source
2016	Don't Hug Me I'm Scared	Shovel		
2016-19	MyStreet	Ivan, Levin, Malachi, Agent R		
2017–present	The Game Theorists	Himself, Funtime Freddy		
2019–present	Spooky Month	Roy, Fat Thief	Special	
2020	The Message	Mantabolt, Bullwark, XLR8	Video short	
2020–present	And Beyond	Various characters		
2021	Freddy & Friends: On Tour!	Freddy Fazbear	Voice performer	
2022–present	Chikn Nuggit	Bezel, Overlord		
2023–2026	5 Years Later	Dr. Animo, Echo Echo, XLR8, Lodestar, NRG, Humungousaur, Slapback, Hack, Portaler, The Void, Clockwork (Alien), Planet Buster, Big Ben, Way Bads	Also casting director	
