= KonoSuba: God's Blessing on This Wonderful World! Legend of Crimson =

2019 Japanese animated film by Takaomi Kanasaki

- Theatrical release poster
- Kanji: この素晴らしい世界に祝福を！紅伝説
- Revised Hepburn: Kono Subarashii Sekai ni Shukufuku wo! Kurenai Densetsu
- Directed by: Takaomi Kanasaki
- Screenplay by: Makoto Uezu
- Based on: KonoSuba by Natsume Akatsuki
- Produced by: Rie Ogura; Yuji Matsukura
- Starring: Jun Fukushima; Sora Amamiya; Rie Takahashi; Ai Kayano; Aki Toyosaki; Yui Horie; Masakazu Nishida; Sayuri Hara; Tetsu Inada; Maria Naganawa
- Cinematography: Yuki Hirose
- Edited by: Kashiko Kimura
- Music by: Masato Kōda
- Production company: J.C.Staff
- Distributed by: Kadokawa Animation
- Release date: August 30, 2019 (Japan)
- Running time: 90 minutes
- Country: Japan
- Language: Japanese
- Box office: US$7.9 million

KonoSuba: God's Blessing on This Wonderful World! Legend of Crimson (Japanese: この素晴らしい世界に祝福を！紅伝説, Hepburn: Kono Subarashii Sekai ni Shukufuku o! Kurenai Densetsu) is a 2019 Japanese animated film based on KonoSuba light novel series by Natsume Akatsuki. Produced by J.C.Staff, the film was directed by Takaomi Kanasaki from a script written by Makoto Uezu and stars Jun Fukushima, Sora Amamiya, Rie Takahashi, Ai Kayano, Aki Toyosaki, Yui Horie, Masakazu Nishida, Sayuri Hara, Tetsu Inada, and Maria Naganawa. In the film, Kazuma Sato and his party travel to Crimson Demon Village, Megumin's hometown, where they battle a powerful general of the Demon King's army.

In July 2017, an anime project based on KonoSuba was announced. The project was revealed in June 2018 to be a film adaptation of the light novel, with Kanasaki and Uezu returning from two seasons of KonoSuba anime series to direct and write the script, respectively. The title of the film was revealed in November 2018.

KonoSuba: God's Blessing on This Wonderful World! Legend of Crimson premiered in Japan on August 30, 2019, and was released in the United States on November 12. The film grossed over $7 million worldwide and won awards at Newtype Anime Awards.

== Plot ==
Following a recently failed quest, Kazuma Sato, Aqua, Megumin, and Darkness are visited by Yunyun. Yunyun explains the letter from her father telling her to have a son with Kazuma to make their child avenge the people of Crimson Demon Village, her and Megumin's hometown, when they get destroyed. However, they discover that the part asking for Yunyun to have a son with Kazuma was actually an excerpt of a classmate's fanfiction that was accidentally sent with the letter. Still, Megumin decides to check her village's condition, so Kazuma's party asks Wiz to teleport them.

After defeating a group of female orcs and an army of goblins with Yunyun and Crimson Demon Clan members' help, Kazuma's party arrives at the Crimson Demon Village and visits Yunyun's father, who admits to exaggerating the aftermath of the attack on the village by one of the Demon King's generals named Sylvia. In fact, the Crimson Demons have been effortlessly repelling all Sylvia's attacks so far. Afterward, Kazuma's party visits Megumin's house and meets her family, who become interested in Kazuma for his fortune. The following day, Megumin shows Kazuma and Aqua around the village, visiting her school and the storage building that holds the Mage Killer, a weapon capable of destroying the world. They later find Darkness fighting Sylvia and her army, but Sylvia retreats after learning of the defeat of Verdia, Vanir, and Hans from Kazuma. Later that night, Sylvia manages to take Kazuma hostage and brings him to the storage building to steal the Mage Killer, but Kazuma traps her inside and reunites with his party. She then fuses with the Mage Killer and begins destroying the Crimson Demon Village. Kazuma's party finds a high tech rifle that was built to counter the Mage Killer and uses it to kill Sylvia.

A dying Sylvia encounters Verdia and Hans in the afterlife and fuses with them to be revived as a giant monster. Wiz and Vanir arrive at the village for a business trip but end up joining the fight. Wiz collects the Crimson Demon Clan members' magic and transfers it to Megumin and Yunyun, while Kazuma seduces Sylvia to buy them time. Megumin and Yunyun destroy Sylvia with their combined powerful attack, with Kazuma also perishing. Afterward, Kazuma is revived and returns to Axel with his party. While on a picnic, Megumin asks Kazuma to put her experience points into another skill to be a useful mage without relying on her Explosion magic. She casts her final Explosion skill as a farewell but finds it much stronger than usual, realizing that Kazuma disregarded her request and put the points on it instead. As they meet up with the others, the smoke from the explosion forms the shape of a heart in the sky.

== Voice cast ==
Character	Japanese	English
Kazuma Sato	Jun Fukushima	Arnie Pantoja
Aqua	Sora Amamiya	Faye Mata
Megumin	Rie Takahashi	Erica Mendez
Darkness	Ai Kayano	Cristina Vee
Yunyun	Aki Toyosaki	Kayli Mills
Wiz	Yui Horie	Brianna Knickerbocker
Vanir	Masakazu Nishida	Robbie Daymond
Chomusuke	Hitomi Nabatame	Ryan Bartley
Komekko	Maria Naganawa	Jackie Lastra
Hyoizaburoo	Hiroki Takahashi	Joe J. Thomas
Yuiyui	Mamiko Noto	Dorothy Elias-Fahn
Hiropon	Tsuguo Mogami	
Luna	Sayuri Hara	Erika Harlacher
Ruffian	Tetsu Inada	Imari Williams
Verdia	Hiroki Yasumoto	Patrick Seitz
Hans	Kenjiro Tsuda	Kellen Goff
Sylvia	Akeno Watanabe	Carrie Keranen

== Production ==
In July 2017, voice actors Jun Fukushima and Rie Takahashi announced on a radio program at HiBiKi Radio Station an anime project related to Natsume Akatsuki's light novel series KonoSuba, but they did not confirm the nature of the project. In June 2018, the project was revealed to be a film adaptation of the light novel and to be produced by J.C.Staff instead of Studio Deen, which animated two seasons of KonoSuba anime series. Takaomi Kanasaki was announced as the film's director, along with Makoto Uezu as the scriptwriter and Koichi Kikuta as the character designer. In the same month, Fukushima, Sora Amamiya, Takahashi, Ai Kayano, Yui Horie, and Aki Toyosaki were confirmed to be reprising their respective roles in the film as Kazuma Sato, Aqua, Megumin, Darkness, Wiz, and Yunyun. The film's full title was revealed in November 2018 to be KonoSuba: God's Blessing on This Wonderful World! Legend of Crimson. The light novel's fifth volume, titled Let's Go, Crimson Magic of Explosion!, served as the inspiration for the film.

== Music ==
Masato Kōda was revealed to be composing the soundtrack for KonoSuba: God's Blessing on This Wonderful World! Legend of Crimson in June 2018. In April 2019, Kayano, Takahashi, and Amamiya were revealed to be performing the first ending theme song titled "My Home Town" (マイ・ホーム・タウン), while Machico was set to perform the second ending theme song titled "1 Millimeter Symphony" (1ミリ Symphony). The film's original soundtrack, subtitled The Smoke Signal of Hope in the Clear Blue Sky! (澄み渡る青空に希望の狼煙を!, Sumiwataru Aozora ni Kibou no Noroshi wo!), was released in Japan by Nippon Columbia on September 4, 2019.

All music is composed by Masato Kōda, except where indicated.

KonoSuba: God's Blessing on This Wonderful World! Legend of Crimson Original Soundtrack – The Smoke Signal of Hope in the Clear Blue Sky! track listing
No.	Title	Composer(s)	Length
1.	"Failure"		0:07
2.	"Dead Broke"		1:02
3.	"Entering the Popular Period"		0:16
4.	"Help People"		0:18
5.	"KonoSuba Eyecatch Part 1"		0:13
6.	"Hometown to Be Overrun"		0:52
7.	"KonoSuba Eyecatch Part 3"		0:29
8.	"Work Hard"		0:24
9.	"KonoSuba Eyecatch Part 7"		0:23
10.	"Emergency Quest Activated"		0:11
11.	"Judgment"		1:38
12.	"Endangered"		0:12
13.	"This Wonderful Cantata No. 69 "Passion""		1:52
14.	"Gather! Adventurers"		1:55
15.	"KonoSuba Eyecatch Part 2"		0:30
16.	"Goblin Herd"		0:18
17.	"Miss?!"		0:21
18.	"The Person Who Controls Explosion Magic"		1:03
19.	"Crimson Demon Hero"		0:39
20.	"Brat Shoe Store"		0:12
21.	"Welcome to the Crimson Demon Village"		0:30
22.	"The Chieftain's Speculation"		0:46
23.	"KonoSuba Eyecatch Part 6"		0:41
24.	"Cute Little Sister"		0:22
25.	"KonoSuba Eyecatch Part 8"		0:23
26.	"Don't Cross the Threshold"		0:17
27.	"A Matter of Life and Death"		0:15
28.	"Palanquin Set With Jewels?!"		0:24
29.	"Mysterious Mother"		0:21
30.	"Monologue"		1:56
31.	"Golden Opportunity"		0:34
32.	"Man is a Wolf"		0:30
33.	"Sealed Place"		0:37
34.	"Clothing Store Owner"		0:23
35.	"KonoSuba Eyecatch Part 10"		0:11
36.	"Magic Academy Red Prison"		0:39
37.	"New Magical User"		0:39
38.	"Classmates"		1:01
39.	"Rival"		0:46
40.	"Demon King Army Rush"		0:09
41.	"Tension"		2:34
42.	"In a Hurry"		1:18
43.	"Good Morning"		0:16
44.	"Gratitude"		1:22
45.	"This Time"		0:13
46.	"Be Quiet"		0:37
47.	"Good Luck Blows Fire"		0:48
48.	"Once Again"		0:55
49.	"What Are You Doing?"		1:19
50.	"Woman's Heart"		0:38
51.	"Kill the Magician"		1:22
52.	"A Man Beyond Imagination"		0:39
53.	"The Strongest Power"		3:02
54.	"Goddess Work"		0:19
55.	"KonoSuba Eyecatch Part 5"		0:11
56.	"Railgun (Provisional)"		1:56
57.	"Confront the Demon King Army"		1:26
58.	"Ancient Dispel"		1:51
59.	"Long Blood"		1:39
60.	"Explosion"		1:10
61.	"A Ray of Light"		0:30
62.	"My Name is Komekko!"		0:17
63.	"KonoSuba Eyecatch Part 10"		0:18
64.	"Come Over Here"		0:31
65.	"Case Closed"		0:18
66.	"Horrible Obsession"		4:39
67.	"Burn Everything"		1:36
68.	"The Magic of Betting and Believing in Life"		6:18
69.	"Welcome Back"		1:01
70.	"The Smoke Signal of Hope in the Clear Blue Sky!"		1:31
71.	"My Home Town (Movie Size)"	Ryosei Sato	1:29
72.	"1 Millimeter Symphony (Movie Size)"	Koichi Tabo; UTA	1:31
Total length:			67:53

== Marketing ==
A teaser visual for KonoSuba: God's Blessing on This Wonderful World! Legend of Crimson was released in November 2018. Two teaser trailers for the film were released in December 2018 and February 2019, while two full trailers were released in March and July 2019. Promotional partners for the film included Cure Maid Café, Pomme's Omelette Rice, Yaro Ramen, Roll Ice Cream Factory, and Shinjuku Alta.

== Release ==
=== Theatrical ===
KonoSuba: God's Blessing on This Wonderful World! Legend of Crimson premiered in Japan on August 30, 2019, and was released in 4DX on October 4. The film was briefly listed for a July 2019 release at Aeon Cinema theaters in Japan. The film was released in the United States on November 12, 2019, and in the United Kingdom on December 12.

=== Home media ===
KonoSuba: God's Blessing on This Wonderful World! Legend of Crimson was released on Blu-ray and DVD in Japan on March 25, 2020. Crunchyroll began streaming the film's Japanese-dubbed version in America, Africa, Middle East, and Europe on March 25, 2020, while its English-dubbed version was delayed from April 2020 to January 2021 for the safety of their employees during the COVID-19 pandemic. The film was aired in Japan on AT-X on April 17, 2021, and was rebroadcast on November 13. Crunchyroll released the film on Blu-ray and DVD in the United Kingdom on December 4, 2023.

== Reception ==
=== Box office ===
KonoSuba: God's Blessing on This Wonderful World! Legend of Crimson grossed $6,513,184 in Japan and $1.4 million in other territories, for a worldwide total of $7.9 million.

The film ranked eighth in its opening weekend in Japan, placing behind Toy Story 4 (2019). It earned $1.13 million from its two-day screening in the United States.

=== Critical response ===
Academy Award-winning screenwriter Roger Avary gave KonoSuba: God's Blessing on This Wonderful World! Legend of Crimson 5 out of 5 stars, feeling that the film gave him "easily one of the best experiences in a cinema I've ever had. I would go as far as saying it's the reason cinema was invented". Nick Valdez at ComicBook.com also gave the film 5 out of 5, feeling that it "has not lost any of the pep in its step" despite being a couple of years since the franchise had released an anime adaptation due to its "fine balance between treating its characters with disrespect and love". He felt that the film had "[p]ure laughs, ridiculous situations, and even some impressive character growth rewarding long time fans".

Writing for Den of Geek, Daniel Kurland gave the film 3.5 out of 5 stars, feeling that it "doesn't aim too high, but it's still a celebration of everything that makes this anime fantasy such a treat". He felt that the film was "likely to disappoint... [but] the characters remain enjoyable enough that the film amounts to a strong summation of the series" and lauded the addition of Sylvia who "makes for a fun addition that is actually intimidating". Jordan Ramée at GameSpot gave the film 4 out of 10, feeling that it abandoned the "main series' traditional formula to deliver a story that's not very fun to watch". Ramée noted the main cast as the best aspect of the franchise but found the film struggling to "capture the same tone as the anime series because it splits up the core group of characters" to focus on Kazuma and Megumin. He criticized the film's repetitive humor and transphobic jokes that went "against the overall message of acceptance".

=== Accolades ===
Year	Award	Category	Nominee(s)	Result	Ref.
2020	Newtype Anime Awards	Best Picture (Film)	KonoSuba: God's Blessing on This Wonderful World! Legend of Crimson	Won	
2020	Newtype Anime Awards	Best Mascot Character	Chomusuke	Won	
