= Sasaki and Miyano =

Japanese manga series

- First tankōbon volume cover, featuring Sasaki (left) and Miyano (right)

佐々木と宮野 (Sasaki to Miyano)
- Genre: Slice of life, boys' love (Note: Sasaki and Miyano is advertised as a "boys life" (男子高生生活, Danshi kōkōsei seikatsu) series as a pun on "boys' love", but publishing industries have acknowledged it as a boys' love series.)
- Manga
- Written by: Shō Harusono
- Published by: Media Factory
- English publisher: NA: Yen Press
- Imprint: MFC Gene Pixiv Series
- Magazine: Pixiv Comic
- Original run: February 26, 2016 – present
- Volumes: 11
- Novel series
- Written by: Kotoko Hachijō
- Illustrated by: Shō Harusono
- Published by: Media Factory
- Imprint: MFC Gene Pixiv Series
- Original run: October 26, 2018 – January 27, 2022
- Volumes: 3
- Manga

Hirano and Kagiura
- Written by: Shō Harusono
- Published by: Media Factory
- English publisher: NA: Yen Press
- Magazine: Monthly Comic Gene
- Original run: March 15, 2019 – present
- Volumes: 7
- Anime television series
- Directed by: Shinji Ishihira
- Written by: Yoshiko Nakamura
- Music by: Kana Shibue
- Studio: Studio Deen
- Licensed by: Crunchyroll: SEA: Medialink
- Original network: Tokyo MX, KBS Kyoto, SUN, TV Aichi, BS NTV, AT-X
- Original run: January 10, 2022 – March 28, 2022
- Episodes: 12 + OVA
- Anime film
- Sasaki and Miyano: Graduation (2023)
- icon

Sasaki and Miyano (Japanese: 佐々木と宮野, Hepburn: Sasaki to Miyano) is a Japanese manga series by Shō Harusono, serialized online via pixiv Comic website since 2016. It has been collected in eleven tankōbon volumes by Media Factory. A three-volume novel adaptation by Kotoko Hachijō was published by Media Factory from October 2018 to January 2022. A spin-off manga by Harusono titled Hirano and Kagiura (平野と鍵浦; 'Hirano to Kagiura') has been serialized in Media Factory's shōjo manga magazine Monthly Comic Gene since March 2019 and has been collected in seven tankōbon volumes. Sasaki and Miyano follows the story of two male high school students as their friendship gradually becomes romantic.

It centers on Miyano Yoshikazu, a timid high school student who secretly enjoys reading boys' love (BL) manga. One day, he crosses paths with an older student, Sasaki Shumei, after a brief incident at school. Curious and intrigued by Miyano's interests, Sasaki begins borrowing BL manga from him, leading to frequent conversations and a growing friendship. As they spend more time together, Sasaki develops romantic feelings for Miyano, while Miyano begins to question his own emotions and understandings of love. The story unfolds as a gentle, character-driven exploration of self-discovery, friendship, and the slow realization of mutual affection between the two boys.

An anime television series adaptation by Studio Deen aired from January to March 2022. An anime film, Sasaki and Miyano: Graduation, premiered in Japan in February 2023.

== Plot ==
Sasaki and Miyano is a slow-burn romance that centers on the evolving relationship between two high school boys, Miyano Yoshikazu and Sasaki Shumei.

Miyano Yoshikazu is a first-year student at an all-boys high school who spends most of his time reading boys' love (BL) manga. He is self-conscious about his feminine-looking face and keeps his interest in BL a secret from most of his classmates. One day, he witnesses an upperclassman intervening in a schoolyard scuffle. That student is Sasaki Shumei, a second-year known for his laid-back, somewhat rebellious attitude.

After their chance meeting, Sasaki becomes curious about Miyano and strikes up casual conversations with him. When Miyano shyly reveals his hobby of reading BL manga, Sasaki expresses genuine interest and asks to borrow some titles. Their shared conversations over manga become a regular occurrence, gradually deepening their friendship. While Miyano is initially surprised by Sasaki's openness and charm, he begins to feel comfortable around him, even as he remains unaware of Sasaki's growing romantic feelings.

As Sasaki spends more time with Miyano, he starts to fall in love with him, though he initially chooses to keep his feelings to himself out of respect for their friendship. Meanwhile, Miyano begins to question his own emotions and identity, unsure whether his admiration for Sasaki is purely platonic or something more. The story follows Miyano's internal journey as he explores his feelings, influenced both by his experiences with BL fiction and his real-life connection with Sasaki.

The narrative unfolds through everyday school life, conversations between friends, and moments of quiet emotional introspection. While their romance develops slowly, the story places strong emphasis on mutual respect, communication, and consent. Supporting characters, including their classmates and friends, provide additional perspectives on relationships and help flesh out the school's social environment.

== Characters ==
Yoshikazu Miyano (宮野由美, Miyano Yoshikazu)
Voiced by: Soma Saito (Japanese); Joshua Waters (English)
A short, bishōnen first-year student. Despite being attracted to girls, he is a self-identified fudanshi, a male fan of yaoi manga, and is watchful for tropes of the genre when they appear in his real life. He hides his hobby from most people out of embarrassment, though he happily shares it with Sasaki. In middle school he often felt self-conscious about his androgynous appearance, an insecurity he gradually grows out of after reaching high school. Sasaki affectionately addresses him as "Miya-chan" (宮ちゃん), or simply "Miya" in the anime's English dub.
Shūmei Sasaki (佐々木秀鳴, Sasaki Shūmei)
Voiced by: Yusuke Shirai (Japanese); Kellen Goff (English)
A tall second-year boy who befriends Miyano at the start of the story. Though he is generally friendly and open to others, his appearance and demeanor have earned him a reputation as a delinquent. He is more expressive than Miyano in his emotions and is the first to recognize his attraction towards him. He eventually becomes Miyano's boyfriend.
Taiga Hirano (平野大河, Hirano Taiga)
Voiced by: Yoshitsugu Matsuoka (Japanese); Brandon McInnis (English)
A classmate of Sasaki and mutual friend of both him and Miyano. Being a year older than Miyano, he shows a strong protective instinct towards him.
Jirō Ogasawara (小笠原次郎, Ogasawara Jirō)
Voiced by: Yūki Ono (Japanese); Jonah Scott (English)
Masato Hanzawa (半澤雅人, Hanzawa Masato)
Voiced by: Yuma Uchida (Japanese); Brendan Blaber (English)
Tasuku Kuresawa (暮沢丞, Kuresawa Tasuku)
Voiced by: Ryōhei Arai (Japanese); Kayleigh McKee (English)
Gonsaburō Tashiro (田代権三郎, Tashiro Gonsaburō)
Voiced by: Mitsuhiro Ichiki (Japanese); Y. Chang (English)

== Media ==
=== Manga ===
The series is written and illustrated by Shō Harusono. It has been serialized online via pixiv Comic website since 2016. It has been collected in eleven tankōbon volumes by Media Factory. The manga is licensed in North America by Yen Press. The spin-off manga Hirano and Kagiura is also licensed in North America by Yen Press.

==== Volume list ====
No.	Original release date	Original ISBN	English release date	English ISBN
1	September 26, 2016	978-4-04-068471-0	February 2, 2021	978-1-9753-2033-1
Ch. 1. "Sasaki and Miyano"; Ch. 2. "If I See Him Again"; Ch. 3. "The Knot"; Ch. 4. "For the First Time"; Ch. 5. "The One I Like"; Ch. 6. "The Catalyst"; Ch. 7. "Chocolate"; Bonus. "A Little Something About the Cultural Festival and Them"
2	May 27, 2017	978-4-04-069161-9	April 20, 2021	978-1-9753-2329-5
Ch. 8. "Senpai Is"; Ch. 9. "Returning the Favor"; Ch. 10. "Just One More Year"; Ch. 11. "Total Chaos"; Ch. 12. "My Limit"; Bonus. "Back to the Main Topic"; Bonus. "A Little Something About Hirano and His Kouhai"
3	January 21, 2018	978-4-04-069529-7	August 10, 2021	978-1-9753-2382-0
Ch. 13. "One at a Time"; Ch. 14. "I Like You"; Ch. 15. "I Can't"; Ch. 16. "A Present"; Ch. 17. "Touching"; Ch. 18. "Feeling"; Bonus. "A Little Something About Kagi-kun"; Special Drama CD Story. "My Wish"
4	October 26, 2018	978-4-04-065186-6	November 9, 2021	978-1-9753-2384-4
Ch. 19. "The Committee"; Ch. 20. "Jealousy"; Ch. 21. "Change"; Ch. 22. "Realization"; Ch. 23. "Losing It"; Bonus. "What You Want in a Partner"; Bonus. "Dear Ideal Person"; Special Drama CD Story. "A Little Something About Halloween"
5	June 6, 2019	978-4-04-065779-0	April 26, 2022	978-1-9753-4190-9
Ch. 24. "Yearning and What Comes Next"; Ch. 25. "Fever and Expectation"; Ch. 26. "Their Last Cultural Festival"; Ch. 27. "Love"; Bonus. "If You're Tired"; Bonus. "The Guy I Like is Popular, and It Bothers Me"
6	March 27, 2020	978-4-04-064486-8	August 23, 2022	978-1-9753-4192-3
Ch. 28. "A Year's Difference"; Ch. 29. "All This Time"; Ch. 30. "Today"; Ch. 31. "Tomorrow"; Ch. 32. "Texts"; Ch. 33. "Normal Things"; Bonus. "One Day"; Bonus. "A Little Story About One Night"
7	November 27, 2020	978-4-04-064973-3	February 21, 2023	978-1-9753-4194-7
Ch. 33.5. "A Little Something About Going Home"; Ch. 34. "Visiting"; Ch. 35. "Homemade"; Ch. 36. "Kidding"; Ch. 37. "A Sister and Her Brother"; Ch. 38. "The Day Before"; Ch. 39. "Graduation"; Bonus. "A Little Something About Spring Break"; Bonus. "A Little Something About Jealousy"
8	December 27, 2021	978-4-04-680958-2	May 23, 2023	978-1-9753-6103-7
Ch. 40. "First Time"; Ch. 41. "Mark"; Ch. 42. "In Exchange"; Bonus. "Side Stories"; Bonus. "Crossovers"; Special Story. "Trick or Treat"; Bonus. "BL Reading Party"
9	July 27, 2022	978-4-04-681141-7; 978-4-04-681140-0 (limited edition)	September 26, 2023	978-1-9753-6479-3
Ch. 43. "Preparations"; Ch. 44. "Daytime Date"; Ch. 45. "Nighttime Date"; Ch. 46. "Again"; Special Assortment of PR Manga; Bonus. "Teaching"; Bonus. "A Break"
10	March 27, 2024	978-4-04-682759-3; 978-4-04-682757-9 (limited edition)	January 21, 2025	979-8-8554-1116-4
Ch. 47. "Mutual Teasing"; Ch. 48. "The Event"; Ch. 49. "Preparing For The Cultural Festival"; Ch. 50. "More Than Before"; Ch. 51. "I Don't Just Want Him To Be Happy"; Side Story. "A Little Something About Hand-Me-Downs"; Bonus. "Interludes"
11	February 27, 2026	978-4-04-685437-7	—	—
Ch. 52. "Only For a Certain 'Someone'"; Ch. 53. "At the End of the Cultural Festival"; Ch. 54. "Sleepover"; Bonus. "Evil"; Bonus. "I Want to Return to the Beginning"

=== Spin-off manga ===
==== Hirano and Kagiura ====
No.	Original release date	Original ISBN	English release date	English ISBN
1	June 27, 2019	978-4-04-065780-6	November 22, 2022	978-1-9753-5206-6
Ch. 1. "Hirano and Kagiura"; Ch. 2. "He Hates Losing"; Ch. 3. "Someone Who Makes You Feel Better"; Ch. 4. "Precious Things"; Bonus. "Where You Return"
2	July 27, 2021	978-4-04-680552-2	March 21, 2023	978-1-9753-6015-3
Ch. 5. "The Next Step From Here"; Ch. 6. "Do You Want To?"; Ch. 7. "Different"; Ch. 8. "All Messed Up"; Ch. 9. "The Answer"; Ch. 10. "How Long?"; Side Story. "Pictures"; Bonus. "Touching His Ears"
3	February 26, 2022	978-4-04-681142-4	July 18, 2023	978-1-9753-6017-7
Ch. 11. "Even More Than Before"; Ch. 12. "Rooting For Him"; Ch. 13. "Options"; Ch. 14. "Chocolate From Senpai"; Ch. 15. "A Chance"; Special Story. "Special Days"; Bonus. "A Little Something About A Do-Gooder"
4	February 27, 2023	978-4-04-682154-6	December 12, 2023	978-1-9753-7673-4
Ch. 16. "Collaborators"; Ch. 17. "Returning The Favor"; Ch. 18. "Flustered"; Ch. 19. "Unfair"; Ch. 20. "Transfer"; Bonus. "New Feelings"; Bonus. "Onii-Chan"
5	February 27, 2025	978-4-04-684395-1	April 28, 2026	979-8-8554-2833-9
Ch. 21. "Continuation"; Ch. 22. "Bit By Bit"; Ch. 23. "Celebration"; Ch. 24. "The Answer"; Bonus. "A Little Something About Cleaning The Dorm"; Bonus. "Ao Ichinose's Second Summer Of High School"
6	August 27, 2025	978-4-04-685054-6	December 15, 2026	979-8-8554-3937-3
7	March 26, 2026	978-4-04-685775-0	—	—
8	December 24, 2026	978-4-04-660791-1	—	—

=== Novels ===
==== Hirano and Kagiura ====
No.	Original release date	Original ISBN	English release date	English ISBN
1	October 26, 2018	978-4-04-065189-7	February 21, 2023	978-1-9753-5204-2
Ch. 1. "For the First Time"; Ch. 2. "Summer Prep"; Ch. 3. "Present"; Ch. 4. "The Fall"; Epilogue. "Good Things"; Bonus Comic. "Some Quality Time Together"

==== Sasaki and Miyano ====
No.	Original release date	Original ISBN	English release date	English ISBN
1	March 26, 2020	978-4-04-064485-1	April 18, 2023	978-1-9753-5210-3
Ch. 1. "She & Kuresawa"; Ch. 2. "Miyano & Kuresawa"; Ch. 3. "Senior & Junior"; Ch. 4. "Love & Passion"; Ch. 5. "Sasaki & Miyano"; Ch. 6. "Kagiura & Hirano"; Ch. 7. "A Friend's Upperclassman"; Interlude. "Where the Calico Draws the Line"; Ch. 8. "Laid-Back & Trouble"; Bonus Comic.
2	January 27, 2022	978-4-04-064971-9	August 22, 2023	978-1-9753-6445-8
Ch. 1. "Report: Confirmed to Be Dating"; Ch. 2. "Kuresawa's Flashback (The School Trip)"; Ch. 3. "White Day Prep & a Proposal"; Ch. 4. "Sasaki & Miyano on White Day"; Ch. 5. "Sasaki & Hirano During Optional Attendance Days"; Bonus Comic

=== Anime ===
An anime adaptation was announced on November 20, 2020. The adaptation, later revealed to be a television series, is animated by Studio Deen and directed by Shinji Ishihira, with Yoshiko Nakamura handling series' composition, Maki Fujii designing the characters, and Kana Shibue composing the music. The series aired from January 10 to March 28, 2022, on Tokyo MX and other networks. (Note: Tokyo MX lists the series premiere at 24:30 on January 9, 2022, which is effectively 12:30 a.m. JST on January 10.) The opening theme song is "Mabataki" (Blink) by Miracle Chimpanzee, while the ending theme song is "Ichigo Sunset" (Strawberry Sunset) by Yusuke Shirai and Soma Saito as their respective characters. Funimation streamed the series outside of Asia, which was later moved to Crunchyroll following Sony's acquisition of the company. Medialink licensed the series in Southeast Asia and South Asia; and is available for fans to catch on the Ani-One Asia YouTube channel, iQiyi, bilibili, etc. An anime OVA episode was released with the ninth volume of the manga on July 27, 2022.

The series was released on DVD and Blu-ray in Japan across 4 volumes, each volume containing 3 episodes. In North America, Crunchyroll released the complete season on Blu-ray on January 3, 2023.

After the final episode, it was announced that the series would be receiving a new anime project. It was later revealed to be an anime film, titled Sasaki and Miyano: Graduation, with the main cast and staff returning from the anime series. It premiered in Japan on February 17, 2023, along with an anime short adaptation of the Hirano and Kagiura spin-off manga. Crunchyroll licensed the film, and screenings were held at Sakura-Con and Anime Central before premiering online.

==== Episode list ====
No.	Title	Directed by	Written by	Storyboarded by	Original release date (Note: Episodes are released every Monday at 12:00 a.m. JST on U-NEXT, 30 minutes before the original air time on Tokyo MX.)
1	"First Time"; Transliteration: "Hajimete." (Japanese: 初めて。)	Souta Ueno	Yoshiko Nakamura	Shinji Ishihira	January 10, 2022
Miyano, a first-year student at an all-boys high school, witnesses another student being beat up. As he is about to intercede, second-year student Sasaki steps in and breaks up the fight. A few days later, Miyano visits the classroom of his fellow disciplinary committee member Hirano, who is in the same class as Sasaki. Miyano thanks him for stopping the fight, though Hirano mistakes Sasaki's interest in him for harassment and warns him not to bother Miyano. The bullies Sasaki intercepted beat him up in retaliation. Afterwards, Miyano offers him a band-aid and Sasaki half-jokingly asks him out on a date. In the coming months, the two boys become friends and begin commuting to school together. Sasaki asks for manga recommendations and Miyano reveals his love for the yaoi genre, leading to him routinely lending him copies of his favorite manga which they privately discuss at school. Sasaki develops a crush on Miyano.
2	"Someone I Like"; Transliteration: "Suki na Ko." (Japanese: 好きな子。)	Shunji Yoshida	Yoshiko Nakamura	Souta Ueno	January 17, 2022
Miyano is embarrassed when Sasaki wants to discuss yaoi manga at school and asks him not to talk about it in public. Privately, Sasaki struggles to combat his growing feelings for Miyano. Miyano's classmate Tashiro observes their close bond and asks if they are dating, which Miyano furiously denies. Kuresawa, the student who was being beat up, defends their manga arrangement despite Sasaki's delinquent persona. The interaction makes Miyano worry that Sasaki is being harassed over his hobby. On their way home from school, Sasaki notices a Valentine's Day display and suggests he and Miyano buy sweets for each other, though the latter declines. Sasaki buys him chocolates anyway.
3	"Senpai Is..."; Transliteration: "Senpai wa." (Japanese: 先輩は。)	Naoki Murata	Sayuri Ōba	Toshinori Watanabe	January 24, 2022
Miyano begins to wonder whether Sasaki's intentions towards him are truly platonic. He overhears an upperclassman confronting Sasaki over his interest in yaoi manga, which Sasaki does not show any embarrassment over. On White Day, Miyano gifts Sasaki some candy, causing Sasaki to become flustered and run off after accepting the gift. The school year comes to a close and Miyano meets Ogasawara, the student who questioned Sasaki about yaoi because of his girlfriend's fandom over it. Later that day, Sasaki and Miyano ride the train home together. Miyano rests his head on Sasaki's shoulder and the latter, thinking he is asleep, whispers "I like you." This startles Miyano awake.
4	"Limit"; Transliteration: "Genkai." (Japanese: 限界。)	Daiei Andō	Yuka Yamada	Daiei Andō	January 31, 2022
A new school year begins as Miyano continues to contemplate the meaning of Sasaki's statement on the train and wonders if he has a crush on him. In the hallway, a passerby accidentally knocks Miyano against Sasaki, causing the latter to become visibly flustered by their closeness. At home, Miyano reasons that he cannot be attracted to Sasaki because he had a crush on a girl in middle school. Miyano overhears Ogasawara arguing with his girlfriend Emi over the phone and tries to offer some advice. Ogasawara reaches out to pat his head, but Sasaki, who is walking past, protectively grabs Miyano from behind on instinct before realizing he is only talking to Ogasawara. The incident causes Miyano to ponder whether he is in fact attracted to males as well as females, and he wonders if Sasaki is as well.
5	"Bit by Bit"; Transliteration: "Ikko Zutsu." (Japanese: いっこずつ。)	Souta Ueno	Yoshiko Nakamura	Souta Ueno	February 7, 2022
As summer approaches, the high school hosts a sports festival. While alone with Miyano, Sasaki confesses romantic feelings for him, but says he does not need to answer him immediately. However, when Miyano asks what is it he likes about him, Sasaki panics and says "Your face." Alone, Miyano wrestles with his complicated feelings for Sasaki and briefly becomes sick. At a committee meeting he falls asleep and Hirano asks Sasaki to watch over Miyano while he goes to see a teacher. When Miyano wakes up he is startled to see Sasaki. Hirano observes their tense interaction and after Miyano leaves Sasaki confides in him about his confession. Using Hirano's phone, he calls Miyano and tells him he likes more about him than just his face before hanging up. Hirano and Sasaki talk in more detail as Miyano feels relief that Sasaki likes him for more than his appearance, which he was insecure about in middle school.
6	"Feelings"; Transliteration: "Kimochi." (Japanese: 気持ち。)	Shunji Yoshida	Sayuri Ōba	Shinji Ishihira	February 14, 2022
After Sasaki's confession, he and Miyano continue to spend time together as friends. As midterm exams approach, Miyano considers the best way to celebrate Sasaki's upcoming birthday given their current uncertain relationship. When the day arrives he ends up giving him a lollipop Tashiro offered him. One day while walking to school together, they note that a year has passed since they first met. On the last day of exams, Sasaki and Miyano share an umbrella while walking home. Miyano takes the opportunity to ask him outright if he is gay, and Sasaki responds that he was never attracted to other men before he met him. Miyano admits that he has never considered the possibility that he likes boys and still is unsure of his feelings, also suggesting that Sasaki's feelings may change as he does. However, Sasaki says he is happy that Miyano is giving his confession serious thought and declares that his feelings for him are unconditional. They agree to remain friends until Miyano is able give him a certain answer.
7	"I Don't Want to Pressure Him"; Transliteration: "Komarasetaku nē no ni." (Japanese: 困らせたくねーのに。)	Mana Yamauchi	Yuka Yamada	Toshinori Watanabe	February 21, 2022
The high school prepares for its upcoming cultural festival. Miyano's class nominates him as their representative in the cross-dressing competition, and he reluctantly agrees one the condition that his outfit isn't too feminine with Kuresawa standing in as his backup. While at a shopping center with Sasaki, Miyano bumps into Makimura, the girl he had a crush on in middle school, and they strike up a friendly conversation, but Sasaki pulls him away out of jealousy. Miyano admits to him that she was his former crush, but says his feelings for her have long since faded. Sasaki in turn apologizes for the way he pulled him away, saying he doesn't want to be rough with someone he cares for. While working, Sasaki frets over the idea of Miyano having a crush on someone else. He also encounters Kuresawa, who explains that he is in the area to visit his girlfriend who is in the hospital. He also formally thanks Sasaki for defending him months ago and admits that he was the person who instigated the fight that day. On the ride to school later that day, Sasaki and Miyano bond as they share headphones.
8	"I Realized"; Transliteration: "Kizuita." (Japanese: 気づいた。)	Souta Ueno	Sayuri Ōba	Souta Ueno	February 28, 2022
At school, Sasaki continues to flirt with Miyano and tease him about his own crush on him. Chairman Hanzawa helps Miyano prepare for his role in the upcoming competition by having him fitted for a traditional outfit. During the fitting, Miyano asks him what he thinks it means to have feelings for someone and Hanzawa postulates that the biggest indicator of love is to be constantly thinking of someone. Sasaki visits Miyano while he is dressed in his costume and questions whether he actually wants to participate in the competition, but Miyano is reluctant to drop out after the hard work everyone else put in. Sasaki becomes overwhelmed by emotion and comes to close to kissing him, but hugs him instead. Miyano becomes aware of his own feelings for Sasaki.
9	"I Want to Take Care of You, Senpai"; Transliteration: "Senpai no Koto Daiji ni Shitaitte Omotte." (Japanese: 先輩のこと大事にしたいって思って。)	Naoki Murata	Yuka Yamada	Toshinori Watanabe	March 7, 2022
Miyano struggles to define the nature of his attraction to Sasaki with certainty. Kuresawa takes notice of his troubles and invites him to go to the bookstore for him. Miyano later tells Sasaki he has decided to continue with the drag contest and they make plans to spend time together during the cultural festival. During class, Sasaki comes down with a cold and goes to the nurse's office to find to that she is absent. Outside he meets Miyano, who is there for a minor burn he received in his home economics class. They go inside and Miyano takes charge of caring for him, which Sasaki can't help but be captivated by. Miyano offers to walk him home and Sasaki questions why, but he's disappointed when Miyano claims to be motivated by obligation. The day of the cultural festival arrives and Miyano and Kuresawa visit Sasaki and Hirano's class, where they are hosting a delinquent-based cosplay café.
10	"Love"; Transliteration: "Koi." (Japanese: 恋。)	Shunji Yoshida	Sayuri Ōba	Toshinori Watanabe	March 14, 2022
At the café, Hanzawa is telling fortunes and Miyano has a session with him. He asks for advice in feeling more confident in his desires and Hanzawa advises him to continue forward even if he is uncertain. As Sasaki watches from a distance, the drag competition is held and ends with Miyano being named runner-up. The festival ends and the two boys watch the fireworks together from the school. Miyano, abashed by Sasaki's open affection towards him and unwilling to risk hurting him, asks for more time to give him an answer. Sasaki agrees as he conceals his own anxiety and impatience. Sometime later at the mall, Miyano runs into Sasaki, who is there shopping with his older sister and Ogasawara. Ogasawara asks Miyano what he thinks of Sasaki, and Miyano sheepishly says he admires him. Sasaki intervenes before Ogasawara can push further and changes the subject. Sasaki and Miyano see a yaoi film together alongside a mostly-female audience and afterwards overhear two other moviegoers innocently speculating that they are on a date. Miyano finally accepts that he is in love with Sasaki.
11	"What Do I Do About These Feelings?"; Transliteration: "Kono Kanjō o Dōshitara Ii." (Japanese: この感情をどうしたらいい。)	Naoki Murata	Yuka Yamada	Rebun Koiwai	March 21, 2022
Hanzawa sees Sasaki and Miyano at the movie theater and notices their mutual attraction. Miyano decides to tell Sasaki how he feels about him but struggles to work up the courage. He's persuaded to further postpone his confession after hearing a superstition that couples who get together right before Christmas will break up shortly after. During winter break, Miyano runs into Hanzawa and his older brother at the mall. Hanzawa recalls how his two older brothers came out to their mother in the presence of himself and their sister. The break ends, but Miyano is unable to find time alone with Sasaki to confess to him. Finally he is able to arrange to walk home with him after school. Sasaki asks why he always changes the arm he carries his schoolbag on when he sees him, and Miyano explains that it's a habit he developed so his bag won't knock into him when they walk together. Touched by the subtle gesture, Sasaki attempts to kiss him, but Miyano inadvertently pushes him away. Sasaki runs away in embarrassment and shame.
12	"Just Beginning"; Transliteration: "Ashita." (Japanese: 明日。)	Souta Ueno	Yoshiko Nakamura	Shinji Ishihira	March 28, 2022
Miyano chases after Sasaki but is unable to catch up with him. Outside the school, he meets Hanzawa and Hirano and asks for their help. Hanzawa tells him how his brothers have faced social stigma and argue with their partners, but says he believes he and Sasaki would be happy together and encourages Miyano to pursue him. Miyano leaves to see him at his house while Sasaki arrives home and chastises himself for violating his boundaries with Miyano. Hirano leaves a voicemail for Sasaki falsely claiming that he's forgotten some of his things in hopes that he'll run into Miyano on the way back to school. Sure enough, Sasaki ends up meeting Miyano at the train station and they go to an empty park to talk alone. Sasaki asks forgiveness for going over the line in his advances, but to his surprise Miyano tells him he reciprocates his feelings and they kiss. Afterwards, Sasaki once more asks Miyano out which he now accepts, and they finally exchange phone numbers. In the post-credits scene, Sasaki and Miyano tell their friends at school that they are now a couple.
13 (OVA)	"A Tiny Episode From Before He Realized His Feelings"; Transliteration: "Koi ni Kizuku Mae no Chotto Shita Hanashi." (Japanese: 恋に気づく前のちょっとした話。)	Mizuki Kobayashi	Yoshiko Nakamura	Shinji Ishihira	July 27, 2022
Some weeks before Sasaki and Miyano begin dating, the school disciplinary committee changes leadership. A student reports that a cow-shaped keychain given to him by his girlfriend has gone missing and Hanzawa takes it upon himself to locate it. As he and his friends search for it, Kuresawa questions Sasaki about whether he and Miyano are together. Sasaki says they are not but does not deny having feelings for him and Kuresawa promises to support them both no matter what. Miyano walks in on the conversation and Kuresawa, assuming that Sasaki has not confessed and not wanting to embarrass Miyano, lies and says Sasaki is helping him with his homework. However, Sasaki is uncomfortable with being dishonest with Miyano and later tells him the real reason they were talking. They encounter a cat carrying a key in its mouth which turns out to be the misplaced key to the student council room. The cow keychain is found inside soon after.

=== Other ===
Kadokawa has released two art books, both illustrated by Harusono. The first art book, titled Candy - Shou Harusono Art Collection (Candy - 春園ショウアートコレクション, Candy - Harusono Shō Āto Korekushon) 978-4-04-681330-5, was released on March 26, 2022. Yen Press released an English print of the book on November 19, 2024, 979-8-8554-0700-6.

The second art book, titled Sasaki and Miyano Complete Guide -Graduation Edition- (佐々木と宮野 コンプリートガイド -卒業編-, Sasaki to Miyano Konpurīto Gaido - Sotsugyōhen -) 978-4-04-682825-5, was released on September 27, 2023.

A manga anthology, titled Sasaki and Miyano Official Comic Anthology (佐々木と宮野 公式アンソロジーコミック, Sasaki to Miyano Kōshiki Ansorojī Komikku) 978-4-04-681329-9, was published by Kadokawa on April 27, 2022. Yen Press released an English print of the book on October 17, 2023, 978-1-9753-6646-9.

== Reception ==
The manga won Pixiv Comic's 10th Anniversary Special Edition Web Manga Election in May 2023.

On August 27, 2024, Sasaki and Miyano was banned in schools under the district Brevard Public Schools in Florida due to depicting a romantic relationship between boys, as well as the book being read from right-to-left.
