= List of KonoSuba characters =

The main characters of KonoSuba as seen in the anime. From left to right: Aqua, Kazuma Satou, Megumin and Darkness.

The following is a list of characters that appear in the light novel series KonoSuba by Natsume Akatsuki and its various spin-offs.

== Kazuma's party ==
Kazuma Satou (佐藤 和真, Satō Kazuma)
Voiced by: Ryōta Ōsaka (drama CD), Jun Fukushima (Japanese); Arnie Pantoja (English).
A 17-year-old boy who became a hikikomori, shutting himself off from others and becoming obsessed with video games, after his childhood friend rejected him in middle school.^{LN 5.2.2} While on his way home from buying a video game, he tries to save a classmate from being hit by a tractor that he mistakes for a speeding truck and dies from acute stress reaction, after which he is transported to a fantasy world and becomes a role-playing game character.^{LN 1.P} He has average stats in crucial categories, but above-average intelligence and high luck, neither of which are important to adventurers.^{LN 1.1.1} Because he never chooses a class, Kazuma is referred to as an "adventurer" and can learn basic skills and spells that would otherwise be exclusive to a single class, such as stealing, archery, monster detection, and basic magic and learns to overcome the limitations of his classless status by combining skills and spells. Because he often flirts with women, except for Aqua, who he finds attractive but is not in love with, his companions initially see him as a pervert hopeless in love, but over time he proves himself to be reliable and useful when the situation calls for it. Despite this, Megumin and Darkness fall in love with him over time, though he rejects Darkness when she confesses to him.
Aqua (アクア, Akua)
Voiced by: Kaori Fukuhara (drama CD), Sora Amamiya (Japanese); Faye Mata (English)
The goddess of water who likes to be worshipped for her status, especially by her devoted religion, the Axis Cult. She judges humans to be sent to the RPG world until Kazuma forces her to accompany him after provoking him by mocking his death.^{LN 1.P} She is energetic and prideful, splurges most of the time, and is a crybaby, often bursting to tears when upset. As an archpriest and goddess, she is powerful against demons and the undead and can resurrect the recently deceased and purify water through her touch. She has high stats in both magic and physical capabilities, though her intelligence and luck are low.^{LN 1.1.1} As well, rather than learning combat-oriented skills, she spends most of her skill points learning her Nature's Beauty skill.^{LN 1.1.7}
Megumin (めぐみん)
Voiced by: Maaya Uchida (drama CD), Rie Takahashi (Japanese); Erica Mendez (English)
A 14-year-old ^{LN 14.3.3} archwizard who belongs to the Crimson Demons clan – humans with dark hair and crimson eyes, a high affinity for magic, and chūnibyō characteristics.^{LN 5.5.5} She refuses to learn other skills and knows a single spell: a powerful Explosion spell that depletes her mana and incapacitates her after a single use. Because of the spell's strength and side effects, she struggles to find a party to accept her before meeting Kazuma.^{LN 1.1.7} She eventually falls in love with Kazuma. She confesses her feelings to him, leading to them becoming a couple, but their secret is revealed when Darkness also confesses her love for him, and is immediately rejected. She is the protagonist of the spin-off Kono Subarashii Sekai ni Bakuen wo! In the universe of KonoSuba, a parallel world with MMORPG elements, Megumin is a sorcerer who joins protagonist Kazuma Satou's party in an attempt to defeat the Demon King. The character's popularity led to Megumin becoming the lead character in the KonoSuba: God's Blessing on This Wonderful World! Legend of Crimson film, which explores her background, as well as starring in her own spin-off light novel series KonoSuba: An Explosion on This Wonderful World!, which explores her story prior to the events of the main series. The spin-off light novels have since been adapted into both a manga series and an anime television series. When Akatsuki Natsume was creating the main characters of the series, he kept in mind that their party should have the same basic structure as the Dragon Quest games but with major flaws. For Megumin, he said that she's pretty similar to Dragon Quest mages who only want to use the skill 'Magic Burst', a powerful move in that series which drains all of a character's mana points, without any regard for others most of the time. Akatsuki also stated that he made Megumin an "edgelord", because any teenage wizard with power comparable to her would be one. Megumin was initially supposed to have long hair, but she decided against it after she realised that all of the girls in the main cast had long hair. She instead balanced their appearances by giving Megumin a boyish look with shorter hair. To fit with her chūnibyō characteristics, Kurone gave Megumin fingerless gloves, an eyepatch worn purely for aesthetics, bandages, and a red and black colour scheme. She included a hat in the design as she believed Megumin looked cute with it. In Japanese, Megumin is voiced by Rie Takahashi. Takahashi recalls the 2019 film's director, Takaomi Kanasaki, wanting her to give Megumin a cool appeal. For romantic scenes between Megumin and Kazuma, Takahashi attempted to give Megumin a cuter, more girly side, which made a major contrast to most of her previous scenes. In retrospective, Takahashi enjoyed the film for how it further expanded Megumin's story. Erica Mendez provided Megumin's voice in the series's English dub, which was produced by the Los Angeles-based studio Bang Zoom! Entertainment.
Megumin is an arch-wizard who is part of the Crimson Demons race – modified humans who possess dark brown hair, crimson eyes, powerful magic affinity, and chūnibyō characteristics.^{LN 5.5.5} She is in her young teens, being 13-14 years old throughout the main series.^{LN 14.3.3} Megumin only knows a single, incredibly powerful Explosion spell that immediately depletes her mana and incapacitates her after a single use. She refuses to learn any other skills. Due to the strength and resulting fallout of her explosion spell, she struggled to find a party who would accept her prior to meeting Kazuma.^{LN 1.1.7} She eventually falls in love with Kazuma and confesses her feelings to him, leading them to becoming a couple. They initially keep their relationship a secret, however it is exposed when Darkness, another member of Kazuma's party, confesses her love to him as well. Megumin appears in a spin-off light novel series that focuses on her life before joining Kazuma's party, titled KonoSuba: An Explosion on This Wonderful World!. It was also written and illustrated by Akatsuki and Mishima respectively. Taking place a year prior to the events of main series, it explores how Megumin learned Explosion magic, and how she eventually came to meet her companions. A sequel novel was also released. Megumin also appears in the crossover series Isekai Quartet.
Megumin's personality is characterised by her boisterous and eccentric nature, which is further accentuated by her love for theatrics. As a member of the Crimson Magic Clan, she displays chūnibyō tendencies, and she has a fondness for giving strange names to people and things. Despite her cocky and arrogant demeanour, she has a childish and immature side, which is evident in her sensitivity towards her age and underdeveloped body. She often finds herself becoming despondent or aggressive when treated like a child. She maintains a petty rivalry with her old classmate Yunyun, though she secretly sees her as a friend, despite never missing an opportunity to bully and harass her. Megumin's obsession with explosion magic is one of her most defining traits. She invests all of her stat increases in perfecting her one explosion spell, which she considers to be the most powerful and useful. Her refusal to learn any other type of magic often gets her into trouble, and she will go to great lengths to protect her explosion magic, even if it means disregarding logic and consequences. Despite her shortcomings, Megumin is acknowledged by Kazuma as having the most common sense out of anyone in the group. She is fairly intelligent and adept at magic, and her love and loyalty towards her friends are unwavering, and she will fiercely protect them if necessary.
Megumin in particular has been considered one of the series' most popular characters, winning Sneaker Bunko's official Favorite KonoSuba Character poll. In another poll from 2019, Megumin took second place behind Aqua. She was also the sixth-highest vote in Newtype's 2015–16 Awards for Best Female Character (Kazuma was third in the male category) and received the most "Other" votes in the Best Girl category in Crunchyroll's Anime Awards 2016. SportsKeeda listed Megumin as one of the ten anime characters "that no one hates" due to how she overshadows the disliked Darkness from the same series while her preference for explosions is "impressive". In analysing character designs, Otaku USA deemed Megumin's eyepatch to be more of a subversion of common eyepatches in anime fashion as Megumin just uses it for fashion. In July 2020, a smartphone app called Isekai, a mobile app that allows you to talk to anime characters, released an update featuring some of Megumin's dialogue as part of their summer event.
The character is often seen as one of the best heroines from KonoSuba, with sites comparing her with Aqua and Darkness. Anime UK News felt the animation of Megumin's explosions were well executed in the anime. Anime News Network (ANN) said that Megumin and Aqua are the series' best characters as their gags are hilarious in contrast to the less appealing Kazuma and Darkness. According to ComicBook, the character of Megumin is noticeably popular within cosplayers and merchandising in general. Comic Book Resources went to call Megumin one of the most valuable players detailing five events in the narrative, but also criticised her for her poor treatment of Yunyun. In another article, she was referred to as a great hero, but at the same time had several factors that would make her more appealing as a villain.
Jordan Ramée at GameSpot found the KonoSuba: Legend of Crimson film struggled to "capture the same tone as the anime series because it splits up the core group of characters" to focus on Kazuma and Megumin which he described as "dull" due to how it leads to repetition of the same jokes, while later gags were criticised for their controversial nature. Nevertheless, he still praised the focus on the duo's relationship for giving them a romantic tone. Furthermore, the further exploration of Megumin and Yunyun's relationship was praised for being explored for the first time. ANN stated that the film continued to capture the appeal of Megumin's jokes alongside her background while advancing her relationship with Kazuma. Biggest In Japan stated that the film fully explored Megumin's character and world to the point of overshadowing the rest of the female characters, but certain explored content could come across as problematic.
The Fandom Post also praised Megumin's role in her spin-off An Explosion on This Wonderful World! for the gags she provides. The success of Megumin's spin-off led to The Fandom Post comment that he looks forward to more spin-offs centred around the other supporting characters. Anime UK also appreciated the handling of other relationships involving Megumin, such as with her pet and her friend Yunyun, which were barely explored in the main series. In a further review, the same site commented that the spin-off would please any fan of the character. The character's voice acting has also been subjected to praise. Nick Creamer of ANN commended Rie Takahashi's role as Megumin for the energy provided in her performance. Anime UK News felt Takahashi was appealing thanks to her deliveries, but was overshadowed by Kazuma and Aqua's actors. Erica Mendez's performance as Megumin in the English dub attracted positive responses, with SportsKeeda listing Megumin as one of her best roles due to how her character was written. Japanese manufacturer Good Smile Company released figures of Megumin in their Nendoroid and Figma lines. Plushies were also released by some manufacturers.
Darkness (ダクネス, Dakunesu)
Voiced by: Marina Inoue (drama CD), Ai Kayano (Japanese); Cristina Vee (English)
An 18-year-old crusader who possesses powerful offense and defense, but lacks the accuracy to deliver her attacks.^{LN 1.2.4} She is a masochist, but cares for her friends and becomes serious when issues involve them. It is later revealed that her true name is Lalatina Ford Dustiness (ダスティネス・フォード・ララティーナ, Dasutinesu Fōdo Raratīna), and that she is a noble from the influential Dustiness family who became a crusader against her father's wishes.^{LN 3.3.2} She, like article, eventually falls in love with Kazuma, but is constantly rejected by him.

== Devil King and Generals ==
The Devil King (魔王, Maō) is the main antagonist, who seeks to destroy humanity. According to legend, he was a talented but isolated, young boy who assumed the role of Devil King after defeating the previous Devil King.^{LN Ex. 2.E} He has eight generals who serve him and must be defeated before his castle can be attacked.^{LN 2.3.2} The final novel reveals that his real name was Kyoichi Yasaka (八坂 恭一, Yasaka Kyoichi).

Verdia (ベルディア, Berudia)
Voiced by: Hiroki Yasumoto (Japanese); Patrick Seitz (English)
A dullahan and former knight who, despite being evil, retains a sense of honor from his time as a knight.^{LN 1.3.5} He becomes hostile towards Kazuma's party after article uses his castle for Explosion practice. He is weak against water and is defeated by Aqua's purifying magic.^{LN 1.4.6}
Vanir (バニル, Baniru)
Voiced by: Masakazu Nishida (Japanese); Robbie Daymond (English)
A general who ends up taking over management of Wiz's magic shop.^{LN 4.1.1} He is the devil of foresight and one of the dukes of hell and possesses the ability to read information about others. This ability does not work on those who are as powerful or more powerful than him, including the Devil King's generals, Aqua, and other gods, and Kazuma, whose cunning nature makes him difficult to read. He also has powerful combat skills, which he refuses to use on humans.^{LN 3.4.4} Planning to resign from his position as a boss,^{LN 3.E4} Vanir discovers a previously-cleared dungeon which he turns into his hideout, hoping to achieve his dream of tricking those who defeat him in battle into thinking there were riches inside a treasure chest, only to discover a piece of paper mocking them.^{LN 3.4.4} He is subsequently defeated by Megumin's Explosion spell and forms a second body to live in, moving to Axel and beginning to work at Wiz's shop.^{LN 3.E4} He holds a grudge against Aqua, who frequently attempts to purify him.^{LN 4.2.2}
Hans (ハンス, Hansu)
Voiced by: Kenjiro Tsuda (Japanese); Kellen Goff (English)
A poisonous slime with the ability to devour anything and take the form of those he devours, which he uses in an unsuccessful attempt to contaminate Alcanretia's hot springs.^{LN 4.5.4}
Sylvia (シルヴィア, Shiruvia)
Voiced by: Akeno Watanabe (Japanese); Carrie Keranen (English)
A growth chimera with the ability to modify her own body, usually taking the form and voice of a woman. She attacks the home of the Crimson Demons, whom she despises for their frequent use of magic. She is the main antagonist in the feature film "KonoSuba: God's Blessing on This Wonderful World! Legend of Crimson". ^{LN 5.5.4}
Wolbach (ウォルバク, Worubaku)
Voiced by: Yuki Kaida (Japanese); Reba Buhr (English)
The evil goddess of violence and sloth, who the Devil King's subordinates worship.^{LN 9.4.3} She uses her vast reserves of mana to cast Explosion magic on the Belzerg fort at the frontlines, then teleport to safety. She was split into two entities, one of them humanoid and the other Chomusuke, Megumin's cat.^{LN 9.5.6} The Explosions spin-off series reveals that Wolbach had saved a young Megumin from her other self by using Explosion magic, which inspired her to learn the spell.^{LN Ex. 1.P}

== Supporting characters ==
Wiz (ウィズ, Wizu)
Voiced by: Saori Hayami (drama CD), Yui Horie (Japanese); Brianna Knickerbocker (English)
A powerful, yet timid and kind, lich wizard who was formerly one of the Devil King's generals. She was tasked with maintaining the barrier surrounding his castle,^{LN 2.3.2} though eventually leaves her position under a neutrality agreement that prohibits her from interfering with his army as long as his forces do not target non-combatants.^{LN 4.5.6} She uses her powers to aid civilians and guide lost spirits to the afterlife,^{LN 1.2.8} and also runs a magic shop in Axel, which Vanir later becomes the manager of.^{LN 4.1.4}
Yunyun (ゆんゆん, Yun'yun)
Voiced by: Kana Hanazawa (drama CD), Aki Toyosaki (Japanese); Kayli Mills (English)
Megumin's former classmate and daughter of the Crimson Demons' chief.^{LN 3.1.3} Unlike her peers, who are chūnibyō, she has a normal personality, causing her to be estranged from them. She is a highly skilled archwizard and forms a rivalry with Megumin in order to befriend her.
Kyouya Mitsurugi (御剣 響夜, Mitsurugi Kyōya)
Voiced by: Kōsuke Toriumi (drama CD), Takuya Eguchi (Japanese); Billy Kametz (English)
Another human Aqua sent to this world, who has a misguided perception that he is the ideal hero and that Aqua is a dignified goddess, which annoys Kazuma's party. He wields the cursed sword Gram as his chosen item upon entering the world until he loses it in a duel with Kazuma, who uses his Steal skill to steal it and sell it for extra money.^{LN 1.3.8} His companions are two girls who wield a spear and dagger, respectively.^{LN 1.3.9} After word of the Chivalrous Thief's burglaries spreads, Kyoya is summoned to the capital to serve as a guard.^{LN 6.3.6}
Luna (ルナ, Runa)
Voiced by: Sayuri Hara (Japanese); Erika Harlacher (English)
A receptionist in the Axel guild.^{LN M.3.1} She works at the guild's counter, assisting adventurers in registering and providing quests.^{LN 1.1.1} Despite her attractive appearance, she cannot pursue romantic endeavors due to being busy with her work.^{LN M.3.6}
Ruffian (荒くれ者, Arakuremono)
Voiced by: Tetsu Inada (Japanese); Imari Williams (English)
A recurring character who only appears in the anime. He lives in Axel and, despite being assumed to be an adventurer, works as an artisan weaver.
Chris (クリス, Kurisu)
Voiced by: Ayaka Suwa (Japanese); Kira Buckland (English)
Darkness' friend and a thief who teaches Kazuma the Steal skill.^{LN 1.2.2} She is Eris' mortal guise;^{LN 7.E2} in contrast with her docile nature as Eris, Chris is more energetic.^{LN 6.2.1} In the sixth volume, she becomes known as the Chivalrous Thief after targeting the houses of nobility to steal holy relics.^{LN 6.3.7}
Eris (エリス, Erisu)
Voiced by: Ayaka Suwa (Japanese); Kira Buckland (English)
A kind-hearted goddess of the RPG world, whom Kazuma first meets after being killed in battle. Aqua is jealous of her because she is worshipped more than her despite being her junior goddess.^{LN 2.1.4} It is later revealed that Chris is her human persona in the world.^{LN 7.E2}
Dust (ダスト, Dasuto)
Voiced by: Junji Majima (Japanese); Lucien Dodge (English)
A resident of Axel who was formerly a Dragon Knight and is now a delinquent and Kazuma's friend, who often gets drunk at the guild's tavern or arrested for petty crimes.^{LN 2.1.7}^{LN 3.1.2} He wields a sword and travels with a party of three: Taylor, a sword wielder, Rin, a wizard, and Keith, an archer.^{LN 2.1.8} In the second volume, Dust and Kazuma switch parties for a day; while they both successfully complete their quests, Dust's quest almost results in disaster while Kazuma's goes better because of Dust's more competent party..^{LN 2.1.12}
Cecily
Voiced by: Fairouz Ai (Japanese); AmaLee (English)
A priest of Axel, who befriends Kazuma's party but tries to convert them to the Axis religion.
Zesta
Voiced by: Yasunori Masutani (Japanese); Mick Lauer (English)
The head priest of Axel, who ends up contaminating the local water supply with purple slime.

== Kingdom of Belzerg ==
Much of KonoSuba's story takes place in the Kingdom of Belzerg,^{LN 10.3.6} particularly in the city of Axel, where most rookie adventurers are located. One of Axel's landmarks is its guild, where adventurers can register for jobs and take quests.^{LN 1.1.1} Also located in Belzerg is the city of Alcanretia, one known for its hot springs and civilian population devoted to the Axis cult.^{LN 4.3.1}

Sena (セナ)
Voiced by: Hitomi Nabatame (Japanese); Allegra Clark (English)
The special prosecutor of the Kingdom of Belzerg, who is in charge of serious crimes such as treason and conspiring with the Devil King. She was sent to arrest and investigate Kazuma when the teleported Destroyer core blew up Alderp's mansion.^{LN 3.1.1} Despite Kazuma's innocence, she remains suspicious of his activities and summons him to resolve various situations, including the confrontation with Vanir.^{LN 3.4.1}
Alderp Alexei Barnes (アレクセイ・バーネス・アルダープ, Arekusei Bānesu Arudāpu)
Voiced by: Takashi Nagasako (Japanese); Brook Chalmers (English)
The Lord of Axel, whose mansion was destroyed after Kazuma teleports the Destroyer's core. As punishment, he attempts to manipulate the trial to sentence Kazuma to death, but fails after Darkness intervenes.^{LN 3.1.2} His estate is later under the scrutiny of Kazuma's party after a wave of robberies plagues the nation's nobility.^{LN 6.3.1}
Walther Alexei Barnes (アレクセイ・バーネス・バルター, Arekusei Bānesu Barutā)
Voiced by: Kaito Ishikawa (Japanese); Xander Mobus (English)
Alderp's son. A noble and kind knight of the realm, who Alderp arranged to marry Darkness.^{LN 3.3.6} After Darkness lies that she cannot marry him because she is pregnant with Kazuma's child, he decides to tell Alderp that he has declined the marriage.^{LN 3.3.11}
Ignis Dustiness Ford (ダスティネス・フォード・イグニス, Dasutinesu Fōdo Igunis)
Voiced by: Kazuhiko Inoue (Japanese); Jake Eberle (English)
A prominent noble and Darkness' father, who disapproves of her adventuring lifestyle and attempts to arrange marriages for her, though to little success.^{LN 3.3.2} After Alderp's disappearance, he becomes the next Lord of Axel.^{LN 8.1.1}
Iris (アイリス, Airisu) / Iris Belzerg Stylish Sword (ベルゼルグ･スタイリッシュ・ソード・アイリス, Beruzerugu Sutairisshu Sōdo Airisu)
Voiced by: Kanon Takao (Japanese); Lisa Reimold (English)
The 12-year-old princess of Belzerg. She is curious about adventure stories and develops a close relationship with Kazuma, whom she treats like her older brother, and has a brother complex.^{LN 6.2.4} Despite her age, she is proficient with swords, wielding a divine blade called Calibur.^{LN 10.2.3}

== Crimson Demons ==
A clan which is the main focus of the KonoSuba: An Explosion on This Wonderful World light novel spin-off series.

Komekko (こめっこ)
Voiced by: Maria Naganawa (Japanese); Jackie Lastra (English)
Megumin's younger sister. After finding a puzzle ball like Megumin had years ago, she ends up unleashing demons upon the Crimson village.
Arue (あるえ)
Voiced by: Kaori Nazuka (Japanese); Marissa Lenti (English)
An aspiring writer in the Crimson Demon village, who attends the same school as Megumin does
Funifura (ふにふら)
Voiced by: Miyu Tomita (Japanese); Reba Buhr (English)
A student at Blood Academy who is friends with Dodonko. After Megumin learns that they are exploiting their friendship with Yunyun to get medicine for their parents, she forces them to repatriate Yunyum.
Dodonko (どどんこ)
Voiced by: Sayumi Suzushiro (Japanese); Ryan Bartley (English)
Funifura's friend, who attends Blood Academy and often teases Yunyun.^{[see above]}
Nerimaki (ねりまき)
Voiced by: Shizuka Ishigami (Japanese); Michelle Marie (English)
Chomusuke (ちょむすけ)
Voiced by: Hitomi Nabatame (Japanese); Ryan Bartley (English)
A black winged cat who was Wolbach's pet until Megumin adopted it. It is later revealed that it is one of two entities Wolbach split into, the other being her current self.
Pucchin (ぷっちん)
Voiced by: Mitsuhiro Sakamaki (Japanese); Joe J. Thomas (English)
The PE teacher of Blood Academy.

== Notes ==
- ^LN represents the Light Novel of the series in the format of X.Y.Z, where X represents the volume, Y represents the chapter, and Z represents the part. Chapter P represents the prologue while chapter A represents the afterword of the novel. Ex. and M. refer to the Explosions (Sekai ni Bakuen o!) and Consulting with the Masked Devil (Kono Kamen no Akuma ni Sōdan wo!) spin-offs.
