= Yusuke Shirai =

Japanese voice actor

- 白井 悠介
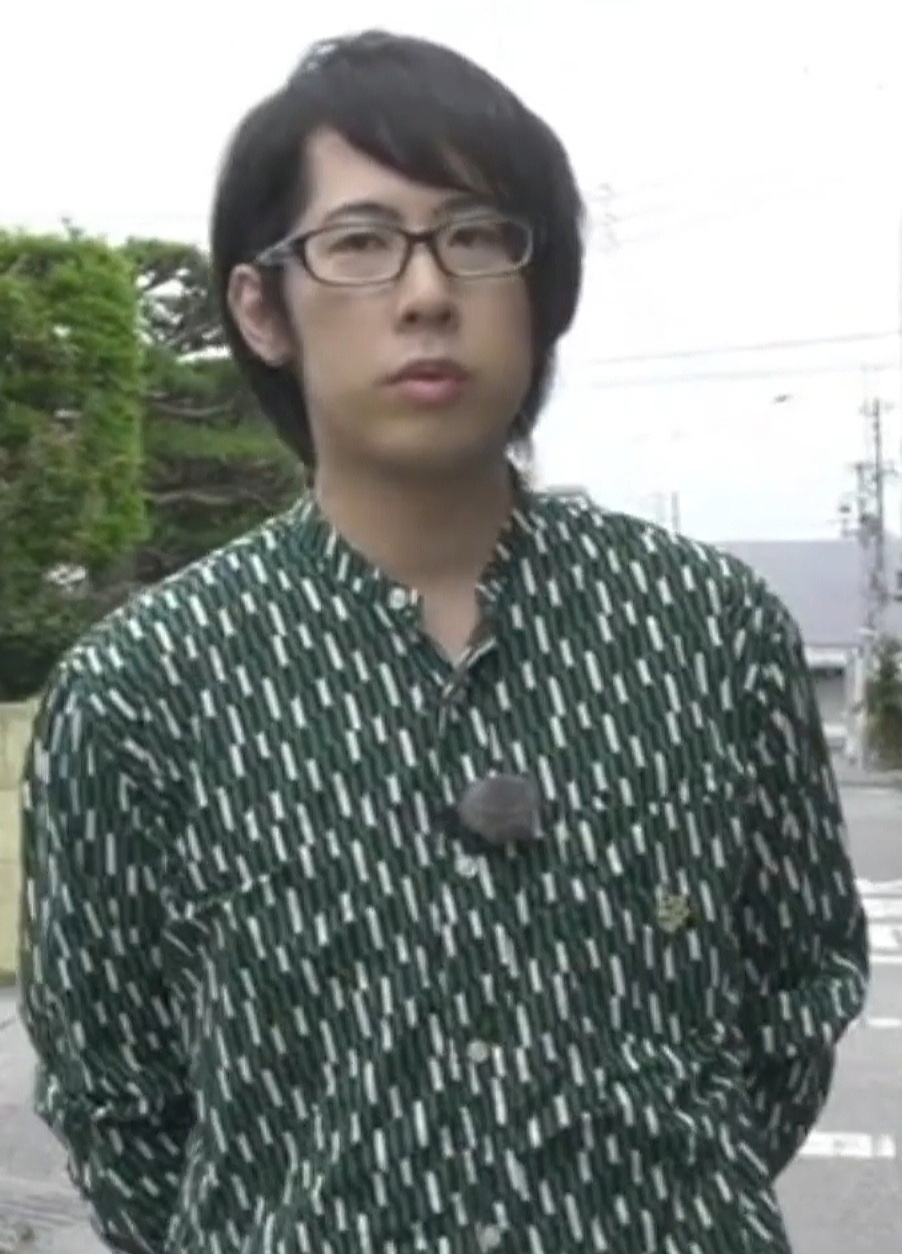
- Shirai in 2020
- Born: January 18, 1986 (age 40); Saku, Nagano, Japan
- Occupation: Voice actor
- Years active: 2011–present
- Agent: Early Wing
- Spouse: Mariru Harada (m. 2020)
- Children: 1
- Awards: Singing Award at the 13th Seiyu Awards

YouTube information
- Channel: Shiraimu Channel
- Years active: 2020–present
- Genre: Let's Play
- Subscribers: 304 thousand
- Views: 53.6 million
- Last updated: 4 September 2024

Yusuke Shirai (Japanese: 白井 悠介, Hepburn: Shirai Yūsuke; born January 18, 1986) is a Japanese voice actor affiliated with Early Wing. Some roles he played include Haruna Wakazato in The Idolmaster SideM, Yamato Nikaidō in Idolish7, and Combat Agent 6 in Combatants Will Be Dispatched!.

== Early life ==
Yusuke Shirai was born in Saku, Nagano on January 18, 1986. His parents house was an art supply store, and his grandfather was a painter. Shirai's brother, who had been watching anime since he was young, went to Tokyo to enter vocational school to become a voice actor. Due to that, Shirai decided to become a voice actor and entered vocational school himself.

== Career ==
After graduating from vocational school, he entered a narrator training center, but later left. At one point he wanted to be an actor instead, but later decided he would rather become a voice actor. After that, he entered a training center run by 81 Produce. However, he left the school after one year and entered the Amusement Media Academy. Right before graduation, he was approached by Early Wing to became affiliated with them. He later decided to become affiliated with them. In 2015, he was interviewed in the first issue of Cast Voice, a magazine focusing on male voice actors.

In 2019, Shirai, along with the rest of the cast for Hypnosis Mic: Division Rap Battle, won the singing award at the 13th Seiyu Awards. In March 2020, he started a YouTube channel.

== Personal life ==
Outside of voice acting, he has been a fan of Liverpool F.C. ever since he watched the 2005 UEFA Champions League Final.

In October 2020, he tested positive for COVID-19, but was asymptomatic.

== Filmography ==
=== Television animation ===
2011

- Future Diary as Student

2012

- La storia della Arcana Famiglia as Renato

2013

- Karneval as Fake Squirry
- Silver Spoon as Ryo Nishikura
- il sole penetra le illusioni ~ Day Break Illusion as Shūji Kishida
- From the New World as Kashimura
- Ace of Diamond as Akio
- Magi: The Kingdom of Magic as Townsperson
- Meganebu! as Makoto Senba, Student
- Little Busters! Refrain as Student B

2014

- Witch Craft Works as Obama
- The World is Still Beautiful as Minor Rani Theus
- Magical Warfare as Schoolboy, Trailer's Magician

2015

- Cute High Earth Defense Club Love! as Iō Naruko
- Ganbare-bu Next! as Masahiro Yanagida
- Diabolik Lovers, More Blood as Lucks
- Durarara!!×2 Ten as Heaven Slave

2016

- Rainy Cocoa in Hawaii as Shank Osman
- Divine Gate as Percival
- Rilu Rilu Fairilu: Yousei no Door as Fairilurea
- Handa-kun as Kei Hanada
- Cute High Earth Defense Club Love! Love! as Iō Naruko
- Nananin no Ayakashi as Shirō

2017

- Nana Maru San Batsu as Ryōta Mukai
- Hitorijime My Hero as Yusei Yukiya
- The Idolmaster SideM as Haruna Wakazato
- My Matchmaking Partner Is a Student, An Aggressive Troublemaker as Shūji Kuga (TV version)

2018

- Idolish7 as Yamato Nikaidō
- Dame×Prince Anime Caravan as Mihart
- Doreiku The Animation as Takio Minato
- Gurazeni as Yukio Ohno
- The Thousand Noble Musketeers as Hall
- Xuan Yuan Sword Luminary as Meng Ji
- Jingai-san no Yome as Tetsukasa Tsuchikiyose
- Space Battleship Tiramisu Zwei as Romeo Alpha

2019

- Meiji Tokyo Renka as Eiichi Shibusawa
- Papa Datte, Shitai as Ryohei Yui
- Ao-chan Can't Study! as Masaki Uehara
- Stand My Heroes: Piece of Truth as Takaomi Hiyama
- Z/X Code Reunion as Nephrite

2020

- Uchitama?! Have you seen my Tama? as Tora Kiso
- A3! as Masumi Usui
- Show By Rock!! Mashumairesh!! as Sojun
- Idolish7: Second Beat! as Yamato Nikaidō
- The Titan's Bride as Beri Berinal
- Hypnosis Mic: Division Rap Battle: Rhyme Anima as Ramuda Amemura

2021

- I-Chu as Takamichi Sanzenin
- WAVE!! Surfing Yappe!! as Yūta Matsukaze
- Combatants Will Be Dispatched! as Combat Agent 6
- My Next Life as a Villainess: All Routes Lead to Doom! X as Ian Stuart
- Idolish7: Third Beat! as Yamato Nikaidō

2022

- Sasaki and Miyano as Shūmei Sasaki
- Salaryman's Club as Chiaki Takimoto
- Tokyo Mew Mew New as Keiichirō Akasaka
- Shine On! Bakumatsu Bad Boys! as Katamori Matsudaira
- VazzRock the Animation as Futaba

2023

- Malevolent Spirits: Mononogatari, Fukie
- A Playthrough of a Certain Dude's VRMMO Life, Kazamine
- Hypnosis Mic: Division Rap Battle: Rhyme Anima+, Ramuda Amemura
- Zenryoku Usagi, Business

2024

- Cherry Magic! Thirty Years of Virginity Can Make You a Wizard?!, Yuta Rokkaku
- Delusional Monthly Magazine, Saburō
- Vampire Dormitory, Takara Kagurazaka
- A Journey Through Another World, Takumi Kayano
- Tasūketsu, Seraphiel
- Blue Lock Season 2, Miroku Darai

2025

- Tasokare Hotel, Masaki Osoto
- Backstabbed in a Backwater Dungeon, Diablo

2026

- Magical Sisters LuluttoLilly, Mucchi

=== Anime films ===
2023

- Sasaki and Miyano: Graduation as Shūmei Sasaki
- My Next Life as a Villainess: All Routes Lead to Doom! The Movie as Ian Stuart

2025

- Cute High Earth Defense Club ETERNAL LOVE! as Iō Naruko

=== OVA ===
2017

- Cute High Earth Defense Club Love! Love! Love! as Iō Naruko

2022

- Sasaki and Miyano as Shūmei Sasaki

=== Video games ===
2015

- I-Chu as Takamichi Sanzenin
- Idolish7 as Yamato Nikaido
- The Idolmaster SideM as Haruna Wakazato
- Quiz RPG: The World of Mystic Wiz as Yukiya Conrad
- Moero Crystal as Zenox
- Cute High Earth Defense Club LOVE! GAME! as Iō Naruko
- 100 Sleeping Princes and the Kingdom of Dreams as Dayang

2016

- Valkyrie Anatomia: The Origin as Sadamitsu
- London Detective Mysteria as William H. Watson
- Summon Night 6 as Kiel
- Stand My Heroes as Takaomi Hiyama

2017

- Akashic Re:cords as Kogoro Akechi
- A3! as Masumi Usui
- Rage of Bahamut as Apollo
- Granblue Fantasy as Mordred

2018

- Food Fantasy as Huangshan Maofeng Tea, Green Curry

2019

- Grimms Notes as The Ugly Duckling

2020

- The King of Fighters for Girls as Jhun Hoon
- Dragalia Lost as Wise Savior Laufey
- Hypnosis Mic: Division Rap Battle as Ramuda Amemura
- Bungo and Alchemist as Shimada Seijirou

2021

- Arknights as Jaye
- Last Period as Ruse

2022

- Nu:Carnival as Garu/Karu

2024

- Final Fantasy VII Rebirth as Billy

2025

- Wuthering Waves as Cristoforo

=== Drama CD ===
- Re-Kan! as Yamada
- Sasaki and Miyano as Shūmei Sasaki
- Lovesick Ellie as Aoba
- Ore no Buka ga Eroi Mousou wo Yamete Kurenai as Sayama Kaoru

=== Dubbing ===
- The Lazarus Project as George (Paapa Essiedu)
