= Ryōhei Arai =

Japanese voice actor

- 新井良平
- Born: September 1 Saitama Prefecture, Japan
- Occupation: Voice actor
- Agent: Aoni Production

Ryōhei Arai (Japanese: 新井 良平, Hepburn: Arai Ryōhei; born September 1) is a Japanese voice actor who was born in Saitama Prefecture and is affiliated with Aoni Production. His best known roles are in WorldEnd as Willem Kmetsch and Battle Spirits: Burning Soul as Toshiie "Toshi" Homura.

== Filmography ==
=== Television animation ===
- Saint Seiya Omega (2013) (Romulus)
- Battle Spirits: Burning Soul (2015) (Toshiie "Toshi" Homura)
- Lance N' Masques (2015) (Dorgon)
- World Trigger (2015) (Fumifumi Saotome)
- WorldEnd (2017) (Willem Kmetsch)
- One Piece (2019) (Charlotte Newichi)
- World Trigger Season 3 (2021) (Ryūji Saeki)
- Sasaki and Miyano (2022) (Tasuku Kuresawa)
- Tales of Luminaria: The Fateful Crossroad (2022) (Leo Fourcade)
- Tsukimichi: Moonlit Fantasy 2nd Season (2024) (Tomoki Iwahashi)
- Days with My Stepsister (2024) (Keisuke Shinjō)

=== Animated films ===
- Sailor Moon Eternal (2021) (Zeolite)
- Sasaki and Miyano: Graduation (2023) (Tasuku Kuresawa)

=== Video games ===
- Ys VIII: Lacrimosa of Dana (2016) (Ed and Licht)
- Tales of Link (2016) (Sesk)
- Super Robot Wars X (2018) (Iori Iolite)
- Jump Force (2019) (Male Avatar)
- Tales of Luminaria (2021) (Leo Fourcade)
- Counter:Side (2021) (Kyle Wong)
- Digimon Survive (2022) (Kunemon)
- Xenoblade Chronicles 3 (2022) (Noah, N)
- Octopath Traveler II (2023) (Scaracci)
- Xenoblade Chronicles 3: Future Redeemed (2023) (N)

=== Dubbing ===
- Love in the Moonlight (2016) (Kim Yoon-sung) (Jinyoung)
