= List of Star Twinkle PreCure episodes =

- Season 16
- First Japanese Blu-ray Disc volume of Star Twinkle PreCure' released by Marvelous AQL, featuring Cure Milky (left) and Cure Star (right).
- No. of episodes: 49

Release
- Original network: ANN (ABC TV, TV Asahi)
- Original release: February 3, 2019 – January 26, 2020

Series chronology
- ← Previous; Hug! PreCure Next → Healin' Good PreCure

Star Twinkle PreCure is the sixteenth television anime series in Izumi Todo and Bandai's Pretty Cure franchise, produced by ABC Television and animated by Toei Animation. The series aired in Japan from February 3, 2019, to January 26, 2020, replacing the previous series Hug! PreCure in its initial timeslot and was succeeded by Healin' Good PreCure. The opening theme is "Sparkle Star Twinkle PreCure" (キラリ☆彡スター☆トゥインクルプリキュア) by Rie Kitagawa, while the first ending theme in the first twenty episodes is "Papepipu Romantic" (パぺピプ☆ロマンチック) by Chihaya Yoshitake. From episode 21 to the finale, a second ending theme called "Please Tell me...! Twinkle!" (教えて...! トゥインクル☆) was used.

== Episode list ==
No.	Title	Original release date
1	"Twincool~: Shining in Space, Cure Star is Born!"; Transliteration: "Kirayaba~☆ Uchū ni Kagayaku Kyua Sutā Tanjō!" (Japanese: キラやば～☆宇宙に輝くキュアスター誕生！)	February 3, 2019
One night, Hikaru Hoshina draws a peculiar constellation she spotted in the sky when a mysterious fairy, which she names Fuwa, emerges from her notebook. The next day, Hikaru encounters two aliens, Lala and Prunce, who arrived on Earth through a warpgate Fuwa created and explain they are searching for the legendary Precure. They are soon followed by Kappard of the evil Notraiders who pursue Fuwa, prompting Lala and Prunce to escape into space with Hikaru and Fuwa in tow. When Lala's rocket becomes damaged and Fuwa is sucked out into space, Hikaru rushes in to save Fuwa, who changes her notebook into the Twinkle Book and grants her the Star Color Pendant and Star Color Pen, which transforms her into Cure Star. After Hikaru manages to beat back Kappard, Fuwa gives Lala the power to communicate with Hikaru before her rocket abruptly crashes back to Earth.
2	"A Friend From Space: Cure Milky is Born!"; Transliteration: "Uchū Kara no Otomodachi☆ Kyua Mirukī Tanjō!" (Japanese: 宇宙からのオトモダチ☆キュアミルキー誕生！)	February 10, 2019
As Lala tries to fix her rocket, Hikaru takes everyone else back to her place while trying to keep aliens a secret from her family. The next day, Prunce explains the 12 Star Princesses who protected the universe became scattered across space after their planet was attacked by the Notraiders, sending Prunce and Fuwa to search for the Precure. As Lala laments over Hikaru becoming a Precure instead of her, the gang are attacked by Kappard and his Notray troops. Encouraged by Hikaru not to let data dictate who she is, Lala gains power from Fuwa, transforming her into Cure Milky and allowing her to face Kappard. Afterwards, Hikaru's Star Color Pendant starts making a strange noise.
3	"The PreCures are Disbanding!? Search for the Power of the Star Princesses"; Transliteration: "Purikyua Kaisan!? Sutā Purinsesu no Chikara o Sagase☆" (Japanese: プリキュア解散！？スタープリンセスの力を探せ☆)	February 17, 2019
Prunce deduces that the noise from the Star Color Pendant is related to the Star Princesses. As Hikaru tries to find where the noise leads to, she ends up butting heads with Lala, who wants to wait until her data analysis is complete. After receiving some advice from Elena Amamiya, a florist who is popular at Hikaru's school, Hikaru and Lala learn to stop arguing and listen to each other properly. Upon figuring out that the pendant is acting as a radar, the girls find a Star Color Pen, but it is swiped by another Notraider commander, Tenjou. With Tenjou defending herself with her Notray troops, Hikaru relies on Lala's help to get her through Tenjou's defenses and recover the Taurus Princess Star Color Pen. Using the pen's power, Fuwa revives the Taurus Star Princess, who urges the girls to help Fuwa grow and retrieve the other pens in order to save the universe. In the end, Hikaru and Lala apologize for their bad behavior and are forgiven.
4	"Ciao! A Shining Smile: Cure Soleil is Born!"; Transliteration: "Chao! Kirameku Egao ☆ Kyua Soreiyu Tanjō!" (Japanese: チャオ！きらめく笑顔☆キュアソレイユ誕生！)	February 24, 2019
Lala comes to Hikaru's school, where she observes how much everyone admires Elena for her sporty prowess. After briefly running into student council president Madoka Kaguya, who notices something peculiar about them, Hikaru and Lala go to thank Elena for helping them make up for their fight at her family's flower shop, where she looks after her many siblings. On their way home, Hikaru and Lala come under attack by Tenjou, who uses a smokescreen to keep them separated from each other. Having noticed the commotion, Elena rushes in to protect Fuwa, who gives her the power to transform into Cure Soleil and face Tenjou.
5	"A Secret Transformation: The Lady is Cure Selene!"; Transliteration: "Himitsu no Henshin ☆ Ojō-sama wa Kyua Serēne!" (Japanese: ヒミツの変身☆お嬢さまはキュアセレーネ！)	March 3, 2019
Madoka ends up discovering Fuwa and becomes conflicted over whether she should report her to her father Fuyuki, who is chief of the Diet's Space Research Special Task Force. As Hikaru and the others try to convince Madoka to stay quiet, they come across Tenjou, who attacks with overwhelming numbers of Notreys. Prioritising her own feelings over her father's wishes, Madoka strives to protect Fuwa and gains the power to become Cure Selene. After beating back Tenjou, Madoka keeps everyone's identity a secret from Fuyuki and vows to fight as a Precure.
6	"Dark Imagination!? The Dark Pen Appears!"; Transliteration: "Yami no Imajinēshon!? Dāku Pen Shutsugen!" (Japanese: 闇のイマジネーション！？ダークペン出現！)	March 10, 2019
With Lala struggling to repair her rocket, Hikaru takes her to the local observatory, where a man named Ryo studies the stars, in the hopes of taking her mind off of things. As Lala remains defiant, Ryo shows her his planetarium, teaching her about constellations and relationships. Just then, another Notraider commander named Eyeone uses the power of a Dark Pen to turn Ryo's imagination into an evil monster known as a Notrigger. Realizing the meaning of Ryo's words, Lala relies on the help of the other Cures to retrieve the Dark Pen and convert it into the Leo Star Color Pen, allowing her to defeat the Notrigger, save Ryo, and revive the Leo Star Princess. Afterwards, Lala asks for everyone's help in repairing her rocket.
7	"So Exciting! The Great Rocket Repair Operation"; Transliteration: "Wakuwaku! Roketto Shūri Daisakusen☆" (Japanese: ワクワク！ロケット修理大作戦☆)	March 17, 2019
As the girls begin repairing the rocket with roles assigned by the AI, Hikaru comes up with an idea on how to make the rocket look cuter. Intrigued by Hikaru's design, Lala goes against her AI's predetermined plan and works with everyone to decorate the ship, with the AI noticing how cheerful these logically unnecessary actions are making Lala. Tenjou appears and sends her Notrays to try and smash the rocket, but the Cures manage to protect it and beat her off. With their rocket fully completed, the girls head off into space to search for the next Princess Star Color Pen.
8	"Off to Space We Go: Planet Kennel is Woofderful!"; Transliteration: "Uchū e Gō ☆ Kenneru Sei wa Wandafuru!" (Japanese: 宇宙へGO☆ケンネル星はワンダフル！)	March 24, 2019
The girls arrive on the planet Kennel, where they meet three dog-like aliens named Doggy, Maggy, and Neggy. There, they discover the Libra Star Color Pen being treated like a sacred treasure by Doggy's people, leading Elena and Prunce to clash over whether they should take it from them. As Kappard arrives to try and take the pen for himself, Prunce, prioritising Elena's safety above all else, uses a fur-growing potion to protect Doggy's group as they retrieve the pen, allowing Elena to defeat Kappard. Afterwards, the planet's elder, having fixed the planet's true treasure, allows the pen to go with the girls, who revive the Libra Star Princess.
9	"Rings of Friendship! Star Donuts"; Transliteration: "Yūjō no Ringu! Sutā Dōnatsu☆" (Japanese: 友情のリング！スタードーナツ☆)	March 31, 2019
Worried that her father is close to finding out about Precure, Madoka's stress over maintaining her perfect image leads her to start making mistakes. Noticing her worries, Hikaru and Lala take Madoka to the shopping district for the first time to try Star Donuts for the first time. Just then, Eyeone targets rival classmate Sakurako Himenojo to summon a Notrigger. Supporting her fellow Cures, Madoka retrieves the Capricorn Star Color Pen, allowing her to rescue Sakurako and revive the Capricorn Star Princess.
10	"Sparkling: Welcome to Planet Kumarin!"; Transliteration: "Kirakkira ☆ Wakusei Kumarin e Yōkoso!" (Japanese: キラッキラ☆惑星クマリンへようこそ！)	April 7, 2019
After hearing about the Southern Cross from Ryo, Hikaru decides to search for it, only for everyone's attention to turn towards another Star Color Pen on Kumarin, a planet with twice the gravity of Earth. Guided by a resident named Kumu, the girls are soon confronted by Kappard, Tenjou, and Eyeone, who have received a power boost from their leader, Darknest. As the Cures become overwhelmed by their opponent's new strength, losing both the new Star Color Pen and the Taurus Pen in the process, Fuwa and the others help them make an emergency retreat back to Earth, landing near where Fuyuki is searching.
11	"Shine: The Power of the Southern Cross!"; Transliteration: "Kagayake ☆ Sazan Kurosu no Chikara!" (Japanese: 輝け☆サザンクロスの力！)	April 14, 2019
Escaping from Fuyuki's party to the observatory, the group is discovered by Ryo, who keeps them hidden from Fuyuki and agrees to keep Lala and the others a secret. While Ryo consoles Hikaru as she blames herself for what happened, Eyeone uses the Taurus pen to turn herself, Kappard, and Tenjou into a Notrigger, which attacks Fuyuki. As Hikaru struggles against the Notrigger, she receives encouragement from the others, allowing her and the others to call upon the power of the Twinkle Sticks, letting them defeat the Notrigger and recover the Taurus pen. After the Notraiders escape, Hikaru's group is confronted by Fuyuki when they are approached by a man with a camera.
12	"Farewell, Lala!? The Film Director is an Alien"; Transliteration: "Sayonara Rara!? Eiga Kantoku wa Uchūjin☆" (Japanese: さよならララ！？映画監督は宇宙人☆)	April 21, 2019
The man, revealed to be film director P.P. Abraham, tells Fuyuki that everything is part of a movie, which he ends up having to actually film after Hikaru and the others try to play along. As Abraham, who reveals himself to be an alien in disguise, states that Lala and the others will be sent home for breaking space laws, Hikaru vows to make his movie a success in exchange for letting them stay. Although the girls initially struggle with following the script, Hikaru and Lala's honest feelings over not wanting to part with each other moves Abraham. Just then, Eyeone uses a Dark Pen on Abraham to summon a Notrigger, but the Cures manage to defeat it. Moved by Hikaru's friendship, Abraham allows Lala to stay on Earth, giving her the Earth name Lala Hagoromo.
13	"Lala's Heart-Pounding First Day at School"; Transliteration: "Rara no Dokidoki Hatsutōkō☆" (Japanese: ララのドキドキ初登校☆)	April 28, 2019
Lala begins attending Hikaru's school, where she struggles with all the things she can't learn without an AI. Worried that her behavior and way of talking will cause her classmates to think she and her friends are weird, Lala brings her AI with her the next day to try and fit in more. Quick to notice that Lala isn't enjoying herself this way, Hikaru and the others bring her to school on a day off to remind her to be herself. Kappard them suddenly attacks, targeting one of Lala's classmates to power up his weapon, but the Cures manage to beat him and protect the school. Afterwards, Lala manages to become friends with her classmates just by being who she is.
14	"The Smile Party! The Family's Sonrisa"; Transliteration: "Egao de Pāti! Kazoku no Sonrissa☆" (Japanese: 笑顔 de パーティ！家族のソンリッサ☆)	May 5, 2019
The girls come over to Elena's house and are introduced to her family, learning about their Mexican heritage and their love of song and dance. However, Elena's brother Touma gets upset and runs off the next day, believing that his family is weird. Catching up to Touma, Lala teaches him that the ways different cultures act isn't inherently weird. Just then, Tenjou, who has retrieved the Scorpio Star Color Pen, appears and transforms Touma into a giant Notray. Stating her love for her family despite its weirdness, Elena manages to recover the Scorpio pen and rescue Touma, reviving the Scorpio Star Princess in the process.
15	"The Treasure Scramble! The Space Phantom Thief is Coming"; Transliteration: "Otakara Sōdatsu! Uchū Kaitō Sanjō☆" (Japanese: お宝争奪！宇宙怪盗参上☆)	May 12, 2019
The girl's search for the Sagittarius Color Pen leads them to an auction on Planet Zenny, which they manage to attend thanks to an invitation by space idol Mao. When the pen is put up as an auction item, Madoka uses donuts brought in by Pruns as currency to win the audition. However, the pen gets stolen by Mao, whose true identity is revealed to be that of the space phantom thief Blue Cat. When Eyeone appears with another Notrigger, Blue Cat decides to give the pen to Madoka so the Cures can defeat it and revive the Sagittarius Star Princess.
16	"Aim For the Championship: Madoka's One Arrow!"; Transliteration: "Mezase Yūshō ☆ Madoka no Ichiya!" (Japanese: 目指せ優勝☆まどかの一矢！)	May 19, 2019
Madoka takes part in the finals of the national archery tournament, determined to succeed for her father's sake. However, she is pressured by rival archer Yumika Nasu, who claims that spending time with her friends has made her weak. Wanting to help her, Hikaru and the others make matching Fortune Capsule charms to encourage her. Just then, Yumika, who was actually just feeling lonely, is turned into a Notrigger by Eyeone, but the Cures manage to defeat it and rescue her. Afterwards, Madoka's support from her friends allows her to beat Yumika and win the tournament.
17	"Enemy? Friend? The Thing Blue Cat is Looking For"; Transliteration: "Teki? Mikata? Burū Kyatto no Sagashi Mono☆" (Japanese: 敵？味方？ブルーキャットの探しモノ☆)	May 26, 2019
The girls return to Planet Zenny in order to retrieve the Virgo Color Pen when they run into Blue Cat, who was planning on robbing the house of the rich celebrity, Dramus, which just so happens to be the location of the pen. The girls work with Blue Cat as Dramus puts them through several traps within his house in order to take the rest of the pens, but Blue Cat's intellectual nature helps them reach his lair of treasures. As Blue Cat is mesmerized by the treasures of Planet Rainbow, Dramus attempts to destroy them but the Cures vow to protect them. Kappard suddenly appears and tries to steal the pen by targeting Dramus to power up his weapon, but Blue Cat distracts him, allowing the Cures to defeat him. A grateful Dramus allows the pen to go with the Cures and they revive the Virgo Star Princess. But unbeknownst to them, Blue Cat is revealed to have an agenda regarding the Star Color Pens.
18	"Grasp the New Serial: My Mom's Manga Way!"; Transliteration: "Tsukame Shin Rensai ☆ Okā-san no Manga Michi!" (Japanese: つかめ新連載☆お母さんのまんが道！)	June 2, 2019
Hikaru's mother Terumi, who works as a manga artist, is chosen to draw one-shot manga for a magazine with the hopes of getting serialized. As Hikaru and the others decide to help Terumi out as her assistants, Terumi's editor pushes her to draw a romance manga, feeling sci-fi or fantasy, the genres she excels at, won't sell. Although Terumi manages to finish the one-shot on time, she becomes downhearted upon learning it is being poorly received by the publisher, leading her to become targeted by Tenjou and turned into a Notray. Remembering the fantasy manga that Terumi drew for her as a child, Hikaru rescues Terumi and encourages her to aim for serialization with a fantasy story. Meanwhile, Blue Cat manages to get ahold of a Star Color Pen.
19	"To the Rainbow Planet: Blue Cat's Secret!"; Transliteration: "Niji no Hoshi e ☆ Burū Kyatto no Himitsu!" (Japanese: 虹の星へ☆ブルーキャットのヒミツ！)	June 9, 2019
The girls arrive on Planet Rainbow and find its feline denizens petrified before finding Blue Cat's treasure stash where a Star Color Pen awaits. But are soon followed by Eyeone, who reveals herself to have turned the planet's citizens to stone while experimenting with the Aries Dark Pen. Eyeone manages to capture Fuwa in the battle that followed, Fuwa smelling a familiar scent from Eyeone's butler Bakenyan. It is then that Bakenyan reveals himself to be Blue Cat in disguise, the thief revealing herself to be a resident of Rainbow who infiltrated the Notraiders to steal the Star Color Pens from them. A furious Eyeone uses a Dark Pen to turn one of the petrified citizens into a Notrigger, leading Lala to deduce that they still possess hearts and can be restored as Blue Cat uses a flash grenade to keep Eyeone from stealing the Gemini Star Color Pen. The Cures defeat the Notrigger and revive the Gemini Star Princess sisters, offering to help Blue Cat. However, believing they lack the ability to, Blue Cat uses a smoke pen to run off with Fuwa and Cures' Star Color Pens as she believes they can allow her restore her ruined world.
20	"Shining in the Galaxy: Cure Cosmo is Born!"; Transliteration: "Ginga ni Hikaru ☆ Kyua Kosumo Tanjō!" (Japanese: 銀河に光る☆キュアコスモ誕生！)	June 23, 2019
The Cures catch up to Blue Cat as she reveals her true form as a transforming cat alien, revealing how she learned that the Star Color Princesses' power combined with Fuwa would unleash a great power that she wished to use to restore her people. Just then, however, the group finds themselves attacked by a vengeful Eyeone after she turns herself into a Notrigger. Seeing the Cures risking their own lives to protect her even after everything she had done, Blue Cat's desire to save them causes her to gain the power to become Cure Cosmo.
21	"The Rainbow-Colored Spectrum: Cure Cosmo's Power!"; Transliteration: "Niji-iro no Supekutoru ☆ Kyua Kosumo no Chikara!" (Japanese: 虹色のスペクトル☆キュアコスモの力！)	June 30, 2019
Realising that Eyeone is suffering as Darknest steals her consciousness, Hikaru retrieves the Aries Pen from Kappard but is still not powerful enough to defeat the Notrigger. However, Cure Cosmo is able to manifest the Rainbow Perfume and uses Aries' power to defeat the Notrigger and rescue Eyeone. After the Aries Star Princess is revived, Blue Cat, now going by her original name of Yuni, returns to Earth with the others to join their search for the Princess Star Color Pens. Meanwhile, back in the Notraiders' base, Darknest partially revives.
22	"Welcome Back, Dad! The Hoshina Family's Tanabata"; Transliteration: "Okaeri, Otō-san! Hoshina-ke no Tanabata☆" (Japanese: おかえり、お父さん！星奈家の七夕☆)	July 7, 2019
On Tanabata, which also turns out to be Lala's birthday, Hikaru's father Yoichi returns home from his research on aliens and cryptids abroad. As the family prepares a barbecue party to celebrate all three occasions, Hikaru explains how she encouraged Yoichi to go overseas and pursue his dreams, much to the dismay of his father Harukichi, who felt he was just abandoning his family. Just then, Harukichi, who blames himself for not raising Yoichi properly, is turned into a Notray by Tenjou, but is saved by Yuni. Afterwards, Yoichi and Harukichi manage to patch things up with each other before celebrating Tanabata with their family.
23	"Lots of Fuwas!? The Fuwa Panic!"; Transliteration: "Fuwa ga Ippai!? Fuwa ☆ Panikku!" (Japanese: フワがいっぱい！？フワ☆パニック！)	July 14, 2019
After eating one of Yuni's matter cookies, Fuwa develops hiccups that cause her to spawn multiple copies of herself, which only disappear upon being fed. As the girls try to keep the copies from being noticed, Elena joins Yuni in chasing after the real Fuwa, assuring her that she doesn't have to take on the responsibility all by herself. Kappard then captures the real Fuwa and uses energy stolen from the copies to power up his weapon. Learning to rely on the help of her teammates, Yuni manages to rescue Fuwa and defeat Kappard, after which they find the shock of being captured has cured Fuwa of her hiccups.
24	"Melting Hearts! The Concert on Planet Icesnow"; Transliteration: "Kokoro Tokasu! Aisunō Sei no Ensōkai☆" (Japanese: ココロ溶かす！アイスノー星の演奏会☆)	July 21, 2019
As Madoka laments over winning a piano concert that she felt should've been won by someone else, the girls travel to Planet Icesnow and discover the Aquarius Princess Star Color Pen is being used by a snowman alien named Yukio as a spare nose. Learning that Yukio wants to make the ice girl Iruma smile, the girls show him the fun things that can be done with ice and snow. Although Madoka struggles to make Iruma smile with a musical performance on icicles, Yuni contributes her singing to the mix, leading Madoka to realise that she should have fun with her playing. Just then, Tenjou turns Iruma into a Notray, leading Yukio to give the Aquarius pen to Madoka so that she and Yuni can save her. After the Aquarius Star Princess is revived, Iruma finally laughs, revealing she had tried not to laugh as she thought it'd be rude towards Yukio.
25	"The Whole Starry Sky Festival: Yuni's Memories"; Transliteration: "Manten no Hoshi Matsuri ☆ Yuni no Omoide" (Japanese: 満天の星まつり☆ユニの思い出)	July 28, 2019
The girls bring Yuni along to a summer festival, where she finds herself hesitating to have fun. Catching up to her, Lala tells Yuni about the fun she has spending time with Hikaru and the others, but Yuni is reluctant to prioritise friendship over her mission. Yuni is then confronted by Tenjou, who uses a multiplying Notray to capture Yuni and use her as a hostage against the others. However, the Cures manages to work with Yuni to rescue her and defeat the Notray. Afterwards, as the girls watch the fireworks together, the rocket receives a transmission from Lala's brother, Lolo.
26	"The Mysterious Invader!? The Pajama Party of Terror"; Transliteration: "Nazo no Shinnyūsha!? Kyōfu no Pajama Pāti☆" (Japanese: ナゾの侵入者！？恐怖のパジャマパーティ☆)	August 4, 2019
Learning from Lolo that there is a Princess Pen on Lala's home planet of Saman, the girls begin heading there but are unable to warp all the way due to Fuwa being too tired. Needing to rest for the night, Hikaru decides to hold a pajama party with everyone. While getting to learn about each other during the party, they discover an alien named Yanyan has snuck aboard. Kappard attempts to use Yanyan's anger to power his weapon, but the Cures manage to defeat him. With the rocket too damaged to warp, Yanyan offers to take the girls to her planet to repair it.
27	"The Ocean Planet! Become a Mermaid and Swim Swim"; Transliteration: "Umi no Hoshi! Ningyo ni Natte Sūisui☆" (Japanese: 海の星！人魚になってスーイスイ☆)	August 11, 2019
Arriving on Yanyan's home planet Pururun, the girls receive pearls from Yanyan allowing them to transform into mermaids and swim underwater. However, they are soon pursued by Eyeone, who swears vengeance against Yuni for deceiving her and attacks with a robot. Although Yuni is shaked up by Eyeone's words, Hikaru gives her the encouragement to beat her. The girls eventually arrive at the core of the planet, where they can get their rocket repaired.
28	"The Burning Heart! Repairing the Rocket With Flare the Engineer"; Transliteration: "Moyase Hāto! Shokunin Furea to Roketto Shūri☆" (Japanese: 燃やせハート！職人フレアとロケット修理☆)	August 18, 2019
Elena and Madoka are asked by Flare, a plasma alien and engineer, to pump bellows to power up his flames for the rocket repair, but their stamina is unable to hold out. Hearing about how Flare left his planet to go to Pururun, Elena and Madoka talk about how much they envy each other, leading them to reevaluate themselves. Kappard then shows up to attack Flare's factory, but Elena and Madoka manage to surpass their own limits to beat him back. Filled with renewed motivation, the two girls successfully help Flare repair the rocket, allowing the girls to continue onward to Saman.
29	"I'm Home -lun: The Planet Saman's Melancholy"; Transliteration: "Tadaima -run ☆ Wakusei Samān no Yūutsu" (Japanese: ただいまルン☆惑星サマーンのユウウツ)	August 25, 2019
The girls arrive on Planet Saman, a planet largely influenced by AI, and meet Lala's family, including her twin brother Lolo. As Lolo is commended by the Space Alliance for finding a Princess Star Color Pen, he states that the alliance is interested in working with the Precure. This leaves Lala conflicted about whether to give a proper report on what they've been doing, leading Madoka to sympaphise with her and ask her what she wants to do. Just then, Tenjou attempts to steal the Star Color Pen by turning the head scientist Kuku into a Notray. Although the Cures manage to defeat the Notray, Kuku assumes that Lala is trying to steal the pen, putting out a warrant for the arrest of her and her friends.
30	"Lala's Thoughts and AI's Feelings"; Transliteration: "Rara no Omoi to Eiai no Kimochi☆" (Japanese: ララの想いとAIのキモチ☆)	September 1, 2019
Taking advantage of the confusion, Eyeone hacks into Saman's Mother AI and takes control of all the AI devices on the planet to lure the Cures out and capture them. However, Lala's AI sacrifices itself to protect the girls with the rocket. Eyeone attempts to have Mother take over the rocket, but Lala's AI manages to connect its data with Mother to undo the hacking and release the Cures. Revealing her identity as a Precure to her family, Lala uses the pen Lolo found to beat back Tenjou and Eyeone and revive the Cancer Star Princess. Afterwards, Lala's AI manages to return with its personality intact before the girls make their way back to Earth, unaware that the Space Alliance is following them.
31	"Protect At All Costs! The Last Princess Pen"; Transliteration: "Mamorinuke! Saigo no Purinsesu no Pen☆" (Japanese: 守り抜け！最後のプリンセスのペン☆)	September 8, 2019
Catching up to the girls as they arrive back on Earth, Topper of the Space Alliance requests that the Precure join them, but the girls turn him down due to their personal obligations. Noticing Hikaru's Twinkle Book, Topper takes her to his ship to talk about his failings and ask her to join the alliance to help him bring light back to the galaxy. Just then, Darknest's second-in-command, Garuouga, appears to challenge Hikaru on the Moon using a bracelet given to him by Darknest. As Garuouga obtains the last Star Color Princess Pen, the other Cures come to Hikaru's aid. Although their attacks seemingly have no effect against Garuouga, Hikaru manages to retrieve the Pisces Star Color Princess Pen and weaken Garuouga's bracelet, forcing him to retreat. After the final Star Princess is revived, the power of all the pens brings forth a new pen that transforms Fuwa into a new unicorn form.
32	"Overlapping Thoughts: The New Power of Imagination"; Transliteration: "Kasanaru Omoi☆ Arata na Imajinēshon no Chikara" (Japanese: 重なる想い☆新たなイマジネーションの力)	September 15, 2019
The Star Princesses explain that the Cures must continue to help Fuwa grow in order to restore the universe. Garuouga once again shows up to try and capture Fuwa, revealing how he came to rely on Darknest's power after failing to save his own planet. Steadfast in their desire to protect Fuwa, the Cures use the new Shiny Twinkle Pen to call upon a new power to destroy Garuouga's bracelet, after which Darknest leaves a cryptic message about Fuwa being a vessel. Afterwards, the Star Princesses tell the girls that they must search for something known as Twinkle Imagination in order for Fuwa to reach her full power.
33	"Fuwa's Determination! The Great Lend a Hand Operation"; Transliteration: "Fuwa no Ketsui! Otetsudai Daisakusen☆" (Japanese: フワの決意！お手伝い大作戦☆)	September 22, 2019
While the girls have heaps of work to do upon returning to school, Fuwa becomes impatient waiting for them to finish as she wants to search for Twinkle Imagination. Running off on her own after the others call her selfish, Fuwa runs into Kappard, who turns Hikaru's pet dog Yeti into a shield. As Hikaru tries to save Yeti, Fuwa manages to use her new warping ability to aid her, allowing the Cures to rescue Yeti.
34	"Connected Feelings: Elena and the Saboten Alien!"; Transliteration: "Tsunagaru Kimochi☆ Erena to Saboten Seijin!" (Japanese: つながるキモチ☆えれなとサボテン星人！)	September 29, 2019
The girls are greeted by a cactus alien named Saboro, who is believed to be an inspector from the Space Alliance. Finding that Saboro doesn't use speech, Elena communicates with them using their gestures and shows them around town. However, Saboro becomes upset after Elena shows them her flower shop, leaving Elena to believe that she offended them. Upon learning that this Saboro is actually just a visitor, Elena searches for Saboro, only to discover that Tenjou has turned him into a Notray. Expressing her desire become friends with Saboro, Elena manages to hold them back so the Cures can purify them. Coming to understand Elena's feeling, Saboro changes their form in the hopes of making new friends across the galaxy.
35	"Hikaru is the Student Council President!? The Twincool Election Battle"; Transliteration: "Hikaru ga Seitokaichō!? Kirayaba Senkyo Batoru☆" (Japanese: ひかるが生徒会長！？キラやば選挙バトル☆)	October 6, 2019
Madoka, who is approaching the end of her term as student council president, nominates Hikaru as a candidate for the next president, with Sakurako running against her. As Hikaru pushes herself to act like Madoka to try and win votes, she finds a notebook dropped by Sakurako detailing the various ways she hopes to make school a safer and more relaxing place. Just then, Kappard targets Sakurako to power up his weapon. However, Hikaru's desire to understand Sakurako awakens a power inside her, allowing her to defeat Kappard. Afterwards, Hikaru relinquishes the election to Sakurako, believing she is better suited to be her own kind of president.
36	"Blue Cat Returns! The Rainbow-Colored Heart"; Transliteration: "Burū Kyatto Futatabi! Niji-iro no Kokoro☆" (Japanese: ブルーキャット再び！虹色のココロ☆)	October 13, 2019
Learning that a mafia boss named Don Octo possesses a Rainbownian ring, Yuni once again takes on the guise of Blue Cat to try and steal it, much to others' chagrin. Sneaking into Don Octo's hideout and retrieving the ring, Yuni finds herself up against a newly appointed space police officer named Ann, only for both of them to be caught by Don Octo. Just as the girls rescue them the duo, Tenjou appears and turns Don Octo into a Notray. With the support of both Ann and the Cures, Yuni manages to defeat the Notray and uses her honesty to convince Don Octo to give her the ring.
37	"Winning with UMA! The Halloween Costume Contest"; Transliteration: "Yūma de Yūshō! Harouin Kasō Kontesuto☆" (Japanese: UMAで優勝！ハロウィン仮装コンテスト☆)	October 20, 2019
Hikaru and Lala decide to participate with their class in the Halloween costume contest held in the commercial district of the city, disguised as UMA, which includes Elena and her family, Madoka and Yuni. Kappard, meanwhile, recalls his planet of origin that has now been destroyed and vent his frustration that he has lost it: the Pretty Cures, in order not to frighten the crowd and make them discover the existence of aliens, improvise a scene disguised as fighters and push the enemy away to confront him. The best Halloween costume contest is finally won by Hikaru and Lala's class, by Elena and her family, by Madoka and Yuni and, curiously, also by Kappard.
38	"Shining! Yuni's Twinkle Imagination"; Transliteration: "Kagayake! Yuni no Tuinkuru Imajinēshon☆" (Japanese: 輝け！ユニのトゥインクルイマジネーション☆)	October 27, 2019
Finding no clue as to what and where the Twinkle Imagination might be, Pretty Cure decide to enlist the services of Yuni's old acquaintance who inspired her to infiltrate the Notraiders as Bakenyan: The famous fortune-teller Hakkenyan of planet Uranine. Yuni is rather hasty and wants to quickly find the Twinkle Imagination to restore Rainbow, with Hakkenyan advising her to observe what is around her. But Yuni gets attacked by Eyeone who traced the Princess Star Color Pen's signal to her location, realizing that her deception caused Eyeone to be exiled by the Notraiders and from ultimately the only home she ever knew. With this realization over how similar their pain of losing their respective homes are, Cure Cosmo forgives Eyeone and awakens her Twinkle Imagination which allows her to purify Eyeone along with the other warriors. Yuni offers Eyeone her hand in friendship and to live on Earth with her and other Precure, only for Eyeone to refuse and take her leave.
39	"Elena is in a Big Trouble! Teacher Tenjou's Trap!"; Transliteration: "Erena Dai Pinchi! Tenjō Sensei no Wana!" (Japanese: えれな大ピンチ！テンジョウ先生のワナ！)	November 10, 2019
Elena's teacher announces that the school will be holding an English Speaking Contest and that Elena has been chosen to represent the school. Tenjou decides to disguise herself as a guest teacher and use her cover of mentoring Elena to capture Fuwa. But Tenjou ends up recounting memories of her home world during her interactions with the Precure. Elena writes a speech about how Smiles can connect people, but Tenjou tries to get her to write one about her feeling alone, which brings up old memories for Elena. The next day Elena gives a new speech but is able to use the experiences she had as a child to convey her original idea better. Elena receives a round of applause before Tenjou publicly denounces her speech and runs off with the girls chasing after her, with Tenjou exposing herself before attacking them with a Notray created from the school Principal. But the Cures succeed in defeating it.
40	"The Identity is Exposed!? The Alien in Class 3, Grade 2"; Transliteration: "Barechatta!? Ni nen San kumi no Uchūjin☆" (Japanese: バレちゃった！？2年3組の宇宙人☆)	November 17, 2019
Madoka's Father, Fuyuki, receives a picture of Lala during the last Notraider attack and confronts her at the spaceship. Although Hikaru and Elena defend her with the help of Abraham and Yuni, Fuyuki still doesn't believe them and vows to discover the truth. The next day at school, everyone begins behaving strangely towards Lala. Hikaru confronts the class and finds out from Sakurako that Fuyuki spoke to her about Lala being an alien and that several members of the class remember strange things happening whenever Lala was around. Lala overhears and runs off but Hikaru finds her in the library and comforts her. Kappard then attacks the school and attempts to take the class's twisted imagination but Lala and Hikaru come to rescue them, with no other option but to transform with the other Cures in front of everyone revealing their identities. Kappard attacks everyone but Lala defends the class who begin cheering her on, causing their twisted imagination to disappear and forcing Kappard to take Fuyuki's instead. Kappard continues to bear down on Lala but she comes to realise that she was happy with everyone and just wants to be herself, awakening her Twinkle Imagination. Lala uses her new power along with the other Cures to defeat Kappard. Afterwards the whole class defend Lala against Fuyuki's accusations, and accept her for who she is.
41	"Moon, Shining: Madoka's One Step!"; Transliteration: "Tsuki yo Kagayake ☆ Madoka no Ippo!" (Japanese: 月よ輝け☆まどかの一歩！)	November 24, 2019
Madoka holds an assembly to officially hand over her duties as student council president to Sakurako, learning later from Fuyuki that she is to study abroad in London once she finishes middle school. The next day, while eating donuts with Hikaru and the others, Madoka expresses her concerns to Elena. Madoka feels that her nickname as the Moon may have more truth to it than they realize due to depending on others to shine, though Elena tells Madoka that could shine on her own if she really wants to. Garuouga then suddenly appears and uses Darknest's power boost to overwhelm the PreCure, telling Madoka to surrender as he sacrificed everything to acquire his power. But Madoka realizes that she can decide things on her own and does not need to rely on others to shine, awakening her twinkle imagination. With her new power, Madoka and the other Cures manage to defeat Garuouga. Later Madoka tells her father that she hasn't decided if she wants to study abroad yet, but wants to decide things on her own with Hikaru and the others.
42	"Bewilderment of Smile, Elena's Bewilderment."; Transliteration: "Egao no Mayoi, Erena no Mayoi." (Japanese: 笑顔の迷い、えれなの迷い。)	December 1, 2019
Madoka tells Hikaru and the others about her choice to decide things on her own, before discussing with Elena about her future. Elena says she plans to help out her family by attending a local high school. The next day Elena has her parent-teacher meeting with her mother at school, when Elena doesn't show much interest in what she wants to do, her mother becomes worried about it. Later, Madoka speaks to Elena, sensing something is wrong and wanting to repay Elena for helping her to decide her own dream. Elena admits she is unsure about her future but Madoka encourages her to think about it. Tenjou appears and turns Elena's mother into a Notray, causing Elena to realize that her mother has noticed she isn't truly smiling. Elena becomes downhearted and is beaten down by the Notray but the other Cures manage to encourage her enough to defeat the Notray, though it was a bittersweet win from Elena's perspective.
43	"Feelings to Smile: Tenjou vs. Elena!"; Transliteration: "Egao e no Omoi ☆ Tenjō tai Erena!" (Japanese: 笑顔への想い☆テンジョウVSえれな！)	December 8, 2019
The Cures learn from the Starscape Alliance that Planet Guten may provide them with the technology they need to locate the Notraiders' planet. Upon arriving to Guten, the Cures learn the planet is Tenjou's home world from seeing the long-nosed denizens. They also discover that the Guten residents take pride in their long noses while looking down at those whose noses are small. Elena gets separated from the others while sightseeing and gets attacked by Tenjou before the others come to her aid. Hikaru knocks off Tenjou's mask, revealing Tenjou to have a small nose with her disdain of being patronized by her people being the reason she joined the Notraiders. Tenjou then turns herself into a Notray and defeats the others the Cures before attacking Elena, who begins to understand Tenjou with the realization of wanting to make her and everyone else smile awakening her Twinkle Imagination. After the Cures manages to defeat Tenjou, she takes her leave despite Elena's attempts to reconcile with her. Back home, Elena confesses her feelings to her mother while deciding to become an interpreter.
44	"Surpr～ise: Santa Claus is an Alien!?"; Transliteration: "Sapura~izu ☆ Santa-san wa Uchūjin!?" (Japanese: サプラ～イズ☆サンタさんは宇宙人！？)	December 15, 2019
Abraham contacts the Cures about a Spaceship that has crashed near by and asks them to help with the rescue. At the crash site Hikaru initially mistakes the alien for Santa Claus, however Yuni informs her that it's actually a Santanian, who gets delight out of surprising people with presents. The Santanian has come to earth to give presents to children but unfortunately the delivery robot has malfunctioned in the crash, so the Cures offer to help instead. With Fuwa's warp ability, the presents are delivered in time so the Cures enjoy a break while flying through the sky. Elena reveals to the others her decision to become an interpreter, and everyone starts to discuss what they'll do in the future, when suddenly they are attacked by Darknest. Darknest attempts to take Fuwa but the Cures manage to defeat him, only to discover it was really a Notraider disguised in armor. The following morning, all the children wake up to their presents and the Cures say farewell to the Santanian.
45	"The Twinkling Star: Hikaru's Imagination!"; Transliteration: "Kagayaku Kirakira Boshi ☆ Hikaru no Imajinēshon!" (Japanese: 輝くキラキラ星☆ひかるのイマジネーション！)	December 22, 2019
Hikaru thinks about how to awaken her own Twinkle Imagination, being the only Cure to remain to do so. Once day during a walk in the rain with Lala, they meet their classmates who all start asking Lala about her home planet and the Rocket, so Hikaru uses this as an excuse to go off on her own. Hikaru comes to the Observatory and speaks with Mr Ryo, admitting she's been feeling upset lately as all her friends seem to be moving on without her. Mr Ryo tells Hikaru that its normal to feel that way, before telling her about the star Deneb in the constellation of Cygnus and that it will eventually become the pole star but continue to shine the same. Hikaru heads home but is confronted by Kappard, who uses his own twisted imagination to transform his staff and attacks Hikaru, managing to beat her down before the other Cures arrive. Kappard tells the story of how his planet was destroyed because its citizens thought they could get along with those from other planets but ended up being taken for granted, believing its impossible for different planets to coexist with each other. Lala tells Kappard that he's wrong and that her classmates accepted her when they found out the truth and that Hikaru is fine the way she is. Hikaru suddenly realises what Mr Ryo was referring to with the story of Deneb, and tells Kappard that despite things changing, she'll continue to shine on her own, awakening her Twinkle Imagination. The Cures manage to defeat Kappard, but he is transported away before Hikaru can reconcile with him.
46	"Darknest Descends! Battle at Star Palace"; Transliteration: "Dākunesuto Kōrin! Sutā Paresu no Kōbō" (Japanese: ダークネスト降臨！スターパレスの攻防)	January 5, 2020
The Cures are called to the Star Palace by the Princesses to conduct a ritual with Fuwa and the Twinkle Imagination that will allow them to bring peace to the universe. But the Cures fight Garouga, Tenjou and Kappard when they attack the palace, the three revealed to be wearing special armor that Darknest provided to convert their twisted imagination into power. The battle is soon joined by the Starscape Alliance with Eyeone now supporting the Cures, Hikaru eventually attempting to convince both sides to cease fighting. But Darknest uses the Notraiders' armor to destroy the palace's barrier and immobilize the Starscape Alliance, revealing her true identity as the thirteenth Star Princess Ophiuchus. Ophiuchus explains that she became disillusioned with the universe she and the other Princesses created together, revealing her goal of using Fuwa to erase it to her subordinates' shock while revealing that she destroyed Garouga's planet. Ophiuchus soon places Garouga, Tenjou and Kappard under her control before the Curse exhaust their Twinkle Imagination to purify them, Ophiuchus uses this opportunity to capture Fuwa and the other Star Princesses before departing with the Star Palace.
47	"Save Fuwa! The Universe Disappears Within the Great Darkness!"; Transliteration: "Fuwa o Sukue! Kieyuku Uchū to Ōinaru Yami!" (Japanese: フワを救え！消えゆく宇宙と大いなる闇！)	January 12, 2020
The Starscape Alliance rescue and tend to all the Notraiders, with Garouga explaining to the Cures that Ophiuchus took Fuwa and the Star Princesses to their world to complete the ritual, as she needs the piece of the planet she brought with her when she arrived. Though the Notraiders can no longer warp to their base, Topper reveals the mission to planet Guten allowed to locate the planet with the Cures and their former enemies using that time to reconcile with the Notraiders offering their help. The group arrive as Ophiuchus is ready to commence the ritual to erase the universe, Notraiders distracting her so the Cures can reach the Star Palace. During the confrontation, exiled by her fellow Star Princesses when she opposed their decision to bestow half of their power in all living things in the form of imagination, Ophiuchus how she gradually regained her powers and assumed the identity of Darknest to exact her revenge. She also reveals Fuwa is part of the Star Palace infused with the other half of the Princesses' power, and that she cease to be if the Cures were allow to commence their ritual. The revelation causes the Cures become hesitant to fight back against Ophiuchus, but Fuwa takes the girls' Twinkle Imagination to fight back, sacrificing herself to save the universe.
48	"Overlapping Thoughts! The Star of Hope Shines Through the Darkness"; Transliteration: "Omoi o Kasanete! Yami o Terasu Kibō no Hoshi☆" (Japanese: 想いを重ねて！闇を照らす希望の星☆)	January 19, 2020
Despite Fuwa's sacrifice, Ophiuchus manages to survive the ritual because Hikaru's feelings of losing Fuwa came into conflict with it. Ophiuchus begins the ritual to cover the universe in darkness and erase it, luckily the Precure manage to survive thanks to the power of their pendants. While lingering in the darkness, Hikaru comes to realise that Fuwa and the universe still exist in their hearts and vows to continue to protect it. The Cures manage to transform into their Twinkle Styles and confront Ophiuchus, revealing that the power of imagination is entirely their own. The Cures defeat Ophiuchus and restore the universe; when Ophiuchus asks why she was spared, Hikaru says she wants her to see the universe they'll create. Ophiuchus admits defeat but decides to leave, vowing to return if things become twisted again. With their new power of imagination the Cures manage to bring back Fuwa but unfortunately she no longer has her warp abilities. The Princesses agree to take care of Fuwa at the palace but Hikaru, Elena and Madoka must return to Earth, meaning they must say goodbye to Yuni and Lala. Hikaru says a tearful farewell to Lala before leaving through a portal created by Garouga using Ophiuchus' damaged bracelet. Back on Earth, Hikaru, Elena and Madoka vow to see their friends again someday.
49	"Draw it Into the Universe! My Own Imagination"; Transliteration: "Sora ni Egakō! Watashi Dake no Imajinēshon☆" (Japanese: 宇宙に描こう！ワタシだけのイマジネーション☆)	January 26, 2020
Hikaru, Elena and Madoka are hanging out one day, thinking about their friends in the Starscape. Hikaru finished drawing a picture of the group when suddenly a warpgate opens and Lala's rocket bursts through with Lala, Yuni, Prunce and Fuwa, who has regained her powers. Fuwa grants the girls their pendants again so that Lala can speak with Hikaru. Everyone catches up on each other's lives, Yuni restored Planet Rainbow thanks to Eyeone's help, Lala has introduced Earth customs on Samaan, Madoka has decided not to study abroad while Elena will be. AI then interrupts to remind Lala of her investigation. Lala explains that when Garouga sent them back to Earth, a prototype Notraider mask got sent through to Earth and Lala has been tasked with recovering it. Unfortunately Fuyuki has already found it and gives it to Hikaru's father as he is an expert on UMAs, but he gets excited and puts the mask on backwards turning him into a Notray. The girls transform and defeat the Notray with the help of a new Cure, Cure Grace. Before Hikaru can find out about Cure Grace, she wakes up revealing it all to be a dream. It is then revealed that an adult Hikaru is preparing to be an Astronaut on Japan's first crewed space flight. Elena is providing interpretation for the media coverage, while Madoka is head of the Space Investigation Bureau, overseeing the launch. Hikaru tells Madoka about the dream, hoping that she is taking the first step to keeping her promise to Lala. Meanwhile on Planet Rainbow, Lala is visiting Yuni. Yuni reveals Planet Rainbow has thrived thanks to Eyeone's help and Lala has been traveling around the Starscape. Both Yuni and Lala wonder when Hikaru will fulfill her promise before receiving a message from Prunce about Fuwa. Back on Earth, Hikaru is taken into space on the rocket. Once in orbit Hikaru looks out the window, before hearing Fuwa's voice and smiling as she sees the light of a warpgate through the window.

== See also ==
- Star Twinkle Pretty Cure the Movie: These Feeling Within the Song of Stars - An animated film based on the series.
- Pretty Cure Miracle Universe - The third Pretty Cure Stars crossover film, which stars the Star Twinkle Pretty Cure.

== International broadcast ==
The series is available for streaming with multilanguage subtitles on iQIYI in Southeast Asia.
