= List of Healin' Good Pretty Cure episodes =

- Season 17
- Cover of the first home media release of the series, featuring (clockwise from top left): Cure Sparkle, Cure Fontaine, Cure Grace, and Latte, with Element Bottles around them
- No. of episodes: 45

Release
- Original network: ANN (ABC TV, TV Asahi)
- Original release: February 2, 2020 – February 21, 2021

Series chronology
- ← Previous; Star Twinkle Precure Next → Tropical-Rouge! PreCure

Healin' Good PreCure is the seventeenth television anime series in Izumi Todo's Pretty Cure franchise, produced by ABC Television and animated by Toei Animation. The series aired in Japan from February 2, 2020, to February 21, 2021, succeeding Star Twinkle PreCure in its time slot, and was succeeded by Tropical-Rouge! PreCure. The opening theme is "Healin' Good Pretty Cure Touch!!" (ヒーリングっど♥プリキュア Touch!!) by Rie Kitagawa, while the first ending theme is "Miracle and a Link Ring!" (ミラクルっと Link Ring！) by Machico. From episode 20 onward, "Everybody☆Healin' Good Day!" (エビバディ☆ヒーリングッデイ！) by Kanako Miyamoto is the second ending theme. Toei Animation and Arstech Guild use Unreal Engine 4 to animate the second ending animation. On April 20, 2020, Toei Animation announced that episode 13 and onward would be delayed until further notice due to the COVID-19 pandemic, and that the series would go on hiatus. However, Toei Animation later announced they would continue airing new episodes starting on June 28.

== Episode list ==
No.	Title (Note: All English titles are taken from Crunchyroll.)	Directed by	Written by	Original release date
1	"Holding Hands Tightly! We're Pretty Cure Cure Grace!"; Transliteration: "Te to Te de Kyun! Futari de Purikyua♥Kyua Gurēsu" (Japanese: 手と手でキュン！二人でプリキュア♥キュアグレース)	Yōko Ikeda	Junkō Komura	February 2, 2020
13-year-old Nodoka Hanadera and her family move to Sukoyaka City in hopes of giving her a fresh start. Meanwhile, in another world called the Healing Garden, Queen Teatine entrusts the care of her daughter Latte to Rabirin, Pegitan, and Nyatoran. She also tells them to go to Earth and find people whose hearts resonate with their paws. While the Healing Animals are searching for their partners in the human world, Nodoka is relaxing in the city and meeting up with new friends. Both parties suddenly witness a monster called a Megabyogen attack the area, which the Byogen general Daruizen created. As Latte is weakened, the Healing Animals unsuccessfully try to fight the monster, while Nodoka decides to investigate deep in the forest and finds Latte in critical condition. Nodoka is about to take her to safety until the Animals explain that the only way to cure her condition is to defeat the Megabyogen, as they were created by infecting an Elemental Spirit. Nodoka's resolve to help resonates with Rabirin, allowing her to transform into a Pretty Cure of legend, Cure Grace, and purify the Megabyogen, freeing the Flower Spirit trapped within it and healing Latte.
2	"No Longer Partners!? I Guess I'm No Good?"; Transliteration: "Pātonā Kaishō!? Watashi ja Dame Nano?" (Japanese: パートナー解消！？わたしじゃダメなの？)	Takayuki Murakami	Junkō Komura	February 9, 2020
After the incident in the park, Nodoka takes Latte home and convinces her parents to keep her for a while, to which they hesitantly agree. Meanwhile, in another world, the Byogens learn of the appearance of Cure Grace and declare she will ruin their plans to infect the world. The next day, Nodoka goes to her first day at school, and the Animals come with her in the hope of finding partners for Pegitan and Nyatoran. Nodoka discovers she is in the same class as Chiyu Sawaizumi and Hinata Hiramitsu, two girls who she met the previous day. After school, Latte senses another Megabyogen attack, and calls out for Rabirin and Pegitan. Rabirin had broken up her partnership with Nodoka earlier that day and left with Pegitan trying to follow her. Hoping to make up for the time she lost in her childhood to her illness, Nodoka wants to help protect the world as a Pretty Cure. Rabirin realizes that she was wrong about Nodoka, and the two reconcile. Nodoka transforms into Cure Grace and defeats the Megabyogen, freeing the Tree Spirit trapped within it.
3	"Overflowing Feelings! Transform Into Cure Fontaine!"; Transliteration: "Wakiagaru Omoi! Henshin! Kyua Fontēnu!" (Japanese: 湧き上がる想い！変身！キュアフォンテーヌ)	Yuriko Kado	Junkō Komura	February 16, 2020
Nodoka overhears her classmates discussing the recent monster attacks, but Rabirin implores her to keep her identity as a Pretty Cure a secret. Meanwhile, Nyatoran leaves Pegitan to look after Latte while he tries to find a partner, but Latte sneaks off, leaving Pegitan to find her. However, another Byogen general, Shindoine, infects the water source in the hot spring inn that Chiyu's family runs. Nodoka transforms into Cure Grace in front of Chiyu and reveals her identity, but is overwhelmed by the Megabyogen. Chiyu asks Pegitan to lend her his powers to help Cure Grace, as she can't fight alone. Her resolve resonates with Pegitan and gives her the power to transform into Cure Fontaine. Together, she and Nodoka defeat the Megabyogen and free the Water Spirit trapped within it. Afterwards, Nodoka explains everything to Chiyu and entrusts her with looking after Pegitan.
4	"I Want To Be Cute! The Birth of Cure Sparkle"; Transliteration: "Kawaī! Naritai! Kyua Supākuru Tanjō" (Japanese: カワイイ！なりたい！キュアスパークル誕生)	Ryōta Nakamura	Junkō Komura	February 23, 2020
Nodoka calls Chiyu over to her house when it appears that Latte has become ill. As there doesn't appear to be a Megabyogen attack, Chiyu believes that they should take her to the local animal clinic that Hinata's family runs. Meanwhile, Hinata is running late to join her friend at an outing to the mall when Nyatoran rushes to her to return her lip balm. This causes her to affectionately thank him, until his sudden talking amuses her. Back at the animal clinic, Latte is treated by a vet there, much to Nodoka's relief; suddenly, Hinata comes in and shows them Nyatoran, forcing Nodoka and Chiyu to drag her outside. Nodoka and Chiyu fear that Hinata is going to discover their secret, until Nyatoran plays it cool and tells her he's the world's first talking cat. As they both learn that Hinata is late to her friend's hangout to the mall, they all decide to go there. However, a third Byogen general, Guaiwaru, creates a Megabyogen to attack the area. As Nodoka and Chiyu transform and prepare to attack, Hinata, having returned to the mall to find them, is ecstatic and amazed at what she is seeing. Her spirit impresses Nyatoran and he offers to be her partner, allowing her to transform into Cure Sparkle. Cure Sparkle defeats the Megabyogen, freeing the Light Spirit trapped within it. Afterwards, Hinata apologizes to her friends for being late, and Nodoka and Chiyu follow her to ensure she doesn't tell them their identities as Pretty Cure.
5	"Awkward Day At The Aquarium! We're All So Different"; Transliteration: "Kimazui Suizokukan! Chiguhagu na Watashitachi" (Japanese: 気まずい水族館！チグハグなわたしたち)	Takao Iwai	Ikuko Takahashi	March 1, 2020
Nodoka and Chiyu keep reminding Hinata to keep their identities as Pretty Cure a secret, as she nearly lets it slip as her friends discuss the monster attacks. As they visit the town's aquarium, problems arise as Chiyu and Hinata's personalities clash with each other. But then they notice that Pegitan is missing, as he fled from the aquarium staff when they mistook him for one of their birds. While the trio search for him, Shindoine creates a Megabyogen and accidentally captures Pegitan amidst the attack. Upon arriving at the Megabyogen's location, Chiyu and Hinata see Pegitan and decide to take him back. Nodoka arrives as Shindoine releases Pegitan, and the three girls transform to battle and defeat the Megabyogen, freeing the Bubble Spirit trapped within it. Chiyu reprimands Hinata for being reckless and putting herself in danger, with Hinata apologizing as both girls reaffirm their friendship.
6	"Where's Mom ~latte? The Great Escape!"; Transliteration: "Mama wa Doko Rate? Orusuban Daidassō!" (Japanese: ママはどこラテ？おるすばん大脱走！)	Hiroyuki Kakudō	Junkō Komura	March 8, 2020
Nodoka introduces her new friends to her parents, both of whom are relieved that their daughter has made new friends. Unfortunately, Latte will be home alone for a few hours a day, as Nodoka and her father will be at school and work respectively. Latte becomes down-hearted over being alone, even when the Healing Animals come to keep her company. When the door suddenly opens, it allows her to escape to the town, with the Healing Animals calling upon their partners to find her. After the girls find Latte at a local delivery company, Latte explains to the girls that Nodoka's mom reminded her of her real mother, Teatine, and that she felt like a real mother taking care of her back in the Healing Garden. Chiyu asks the staff of the delivery company where Yasuko Hanadera, Nodoka's mother, is, and learns she is working in a local strawberry farm. At the farm, Daruizen creates a Megabyogen that infects the farm and knocks Yasuko unconscious. The Cures rush to the farm and fight and purify the Megabyogen, freeing the Fruit Spirit trapped within it, who gives Nodoka the Fruit Element Bottle.
7	"Big News!? Nodoka's Secret"; Transliteration: "Dai Sukūpu!? Nodoka no Himitsu" (Japanese: 大スクープ！？のどかの秘密)	Junji Shimizu	Mitsutaka Hirota	March 15, 2020
Nodoka discovers that the editor of the school newspaper, Michio Masuko, is spying on her since he believes that she may be linked to the monster attacks happening in Sukoyaka. One day, while walking in the forest, Nodoka spots Michio and attempts to run away from him, only to trip and injure herself. Michio discovers Guaiwaru summoning a Megabyogen and confronts it, but it knocks him over and he loses his glasses. The Cures arrive and fight the Megabyogen, defeating it and purifying the Rain Spirit trapped within it. Afterwards, Nodoka helps Michio, who apologizes for suspecting her as the one behind the monster attacks.
8	"Chiyu Can't Jump!? Trouble At The Athletics Tournament!"; Transliteration: "Tobenai Chiyu!? Rikujō Taikai Dai Pinchi!" (Japanese: とべないちゆ！？陸上大会 大ピンチ！)	Takao Iwai	Ryūnosuke Kingetsu	March 22, 2020
Chiyu is training for an upcoming track and field event, but suddenly loses the ability to perform the high jump at her usual standards. Pegitan becomes worried, and after consulting his treatment books, concludes that Chiyu has a case of the 'Yips'. On the day of the event, Daruizen creates a Megabyogen to disrupt the activities, but the Cures fight and defeat it. The freed Ice Spirit gives Chiyu the Ice Element Bottle, and she regains her confidence and manages to complete the high jump.
9	"Hinata's Cute Plan!"; Transliteration: "Hinata no Kawaī Daisakusen!" (Japanese: ひなたのカワイイ大作戦！)	Kōji Kawasaki	Mutsumi Itō	March 29, 2020
Hinata notices that Nodoka has a photo collection, but it does not contain any recent photos of her. Nodoka explains that she doesn't have any photographs taken from before she was ill, causing Hinata to suddenly get an idea and take Nodoka and Chiyu to the mall. When Latte runs off, Hinata goes to retrieve her and discovers that Shindoine has created a Megabyogen from a Gem Spirit to attack the mall. Hinata transforms and tries to fight the Megabyogen on her own, but is unsuccessful until Cure Grace and Cure Fontaine join the battle and help to defeat the MegaByogen. After purifying the Gem Spirit, Hinata takes Nodoka and Chiyu back to the shop to finish having their picture taken.
10	"Emergency Treatment! There's Multiple Megabyogen!?"; Transliteration: "Kinkyū Oteate! Megabyōgen ga Ippai!?" (Japanese: 緊急お手当て！メガビョーゲンがいっぱい！？)	Akiko Seki	Junkō Komura	April 5, 2020
The girls take a train ride to a museum, where Nodoka meets a sculptor who makes art from glass. However, they are shocked to discover that the Healing Animals and Latte have decided to come and join them, despite being asked to stay home. Unfortunately, Guaiwaru summons a Megabyogen to attack the museum, forcing the three to transform and fight it. But a much bigger problem occurs as Latte senses two more Megabyogens in two different areas, forcing the team to split up and take on the Megabyogens one by one. Cure Grace struggles to take on Guaiwaru's Megabyogen, despite Rabirin pleading her to shift her focus on the others. As Grace goes down, the three Cures regroup and defeat the Megabyogen before moving on to the next. Before leaving, Cure Sparkle receives power from the purified Light Spirit.
11	"Our Powers Become One! Miracle Healing!"; Transliteration: "Chikara o Hitotsu ni! Mirakuru Hīringu!" (Japanese: 力を一つに！ミラクルヒーリング！)	Takatoya Ippo	Junkō Komura	April 12, 2020
The Cures race to the second Megabyogen, which Shindoine created to pollute a river, managing to purify it as Cure Fontaine receives power from the Water Spirit. The final Megabyogen, which Daruizen created, is terrorizing a meadow of flowers and has become too powerful for the Cures to deal with. After the attack, Daruizen notices that the Megabyogen created a dark seed that went somewhere. As they regroup, the trio is about to give up until the other Elemental Spirits go to the area where the Megabyogen is. The trio once again transforms and goes to fight against the more powerful Megabyogen. As all hope seems lost, Cure Grace encourages the Flower Spirit to not give up, which combines with the other Elemental Spirits and causes the Miracle Healing Bottle to appear. The Cures perform Healing Oasis to defeat the Megabyogen and purify the Flower Spirit. However, the seed from the last Megabyogen goes unnoticed and infects a Nutria.
12	"Unspoken Understanding! The Great Teamwork Plan"; Transliteration: "Ishin Denshin!? Chīmuwāku Daisakusen" (Japanese: 以心伝心！？チームワーク大作戦)	Takayuki Murakami	Mitsutaka Hirota	April 19, 2020
After their previous encounter with multiple Megabyogens, the Healing Animals decide to put the Pretty Cure through a boot camp to improve their teamwork. Suddenly, a Megabyogen created from a Jewelry Spirit appears, along with a new Byogen general named Batetemoda. The girls transform and attempt to fight the Megabyogen, only for Batetemoda to beat them back. By working together, the three Cures manage to defeat the Megabyogen and free the Jewelry Spirit. They drive back Batetemoda, who reveals that he was made from the seed from Daruizen's last Megabyogen before retreating. Nodoka and Chiyu agree that they will continue to work hard to prevent more generals from being created, but Hinata secretly begins to have doubts.
13	"Quitting? Not Quitting? The Wavering Hinata!"; Transliteration: "Yameru? Yamenai? Mayoeru Hinata!" (Japanese: 辞める？辞めない？迷えるひなた！)	Junji Shimizu	Ikuko Takahashi; Junkō Komura	June 28, 2020
Hinata begins to consider quitting being a Pretty Cure, much to her friends' dismay. While trying to explain her feelings, Latte senses a Megabyogen, so the girls go looking for it. Despite Latte's directions, the girls are unable to find the Megabyogen, but discover that everyone around town is suffering from built-up static electricity, and assume it must be the work of the Megabyogen. However, Hinata begins to voice her doubts again, even when her sister becomes trapped in her juice van, but Nodoka and Chiyu manage to encourage her to do her best. The girls discover a drone which has been infected by the Megabyogen and realize it is flying around town. Hinata manages to track down the Megabyogen, along with Guaiwaru and Batetemoda, and the girls transform to fight it. With the help of Cure Fontaine's Ice Bottle, the Cures defeat the Megabyogen using Healing Oasis and free the Lightning Spirit. Afterwards, the Lightning Spirit gives Hinata the Lightning Element Bottle, and she resolves to do her best in the future.
14	"Energy Source! Sukoyaka Festival!"; Transliteration: "Genki Hakken! Sukoyaka Fesutibaru!" (Japanese: 元気発見！すこやかフェスティバル！)	Yuriko Kado	Mutsumi Itō	July 5, 2020
Nodoka attends a doctor's appointment, and is happy to find out she has fully recovered from her previous illness. She is also excited to discover that Sukoyaka City is holding a festival. At the festival, Nodoka meets up with Hinata and Chiyu and learns about Sukoyaka City and the teamwork its citizens have with each other. However, Batetemoda creates a Megabyogen from a Wind Element Spirit to disrupt the festival, but the girls transform and defeat it with the help of Cure Sparkle's Lightning Bottle. Afterwards, the Wind Spirit reveals to them that long ago, a girl who lived in Sukoyaka became a Pretty Cure after partnering with Teatine and had the power to heal people through her music.
15	"Our First Fight... Nodoka and Rabirin Go Their Separate Ways"; Transliteration: "Hajimete no Kenka… Surechigau Nodoka to Rabirin" (Japanese: 初めてのケンカ…すれ違うのどかとラビリン)	Tsuyoshi Tobita	Jin Tanaka	July 12, 2020
Rabirin and the other Animals come across a Daruma doll outside a lavender tea shop. Nyatoran dislikes the doll, but Rabirin secretly likes it. Rabirin confides in Nodoka about the doll, and Nodoka agrees to help her get one in a promotional event being held at the shop. However, when Rabirin finally gets the doll, Nyatoran finds out, causing Rabirin to become embarrassed and throw it away. Nodoka becomes upset with Rabirin and the two have their first argument. The next day, both Nodoka and Rabirin still feel animosity towards each other, which complicates matters when Daruizen creates a Megabyogen from a Leaf Spirit and Nodoka and Rabirin find that they cannot transform. Cure Fontaine and Cure Sparkle fight the Megabyogen while Latte forces Rabirin and Nodoka to talk. Rabirin apologizes to Nodoka for the way she acted, and the two reconcile and transform to help the Cures defeat the Megabyogen. Afterwards, the Leaf Spirit gives Nodoka and Rabirin the Leaf Element Bottle.
16	"The Oath of Friendship! Beneath the Tree of Eternity"; Transliteration: "Yūjō no Chikai! Eien no Taiju no Shita de" (Japanese: 友情の誓い！永遠の大樹の下で)	Hiroyuki Kakudō	Ryūnosuke Kingetsu	July 19, 2020
After learning about the legend of the Eternal Tree, Nodoka, Chiyu and Hinata go to make a vow of friendship under it. However, they are shocked to discover that the tree was killed during a recent storm. They also meet an old man, who tells them that there is no such thing as eternal friendship. The girls learn from the Tree Spirit that the man's name is Tetsuya, and that he made a vow with his friends Fumi and Hideo 50 years ago. The Tree Spirit asks the girls to find Tetsuya's friends and bring them together before the tree is cut down. Nodoka agrees and the girls manage to find Fumi and Hideo, only to discover the truth behind their separation. Unable to convince the three to come together, Nodoka, Chiyu and Hinata make a vow under the tree, before deciding to hold a farewell festival for the tree. On the day of the festival, Batetemoda creates a Megabyogen from the Tree Spirit, and Tetsuya tries to defend it before being rescued by Fumi and Hideo. The girls transform and defeat the Megabyogen, and afterwards Fumi, Hideo and Tetsuya renew their friendship and Fumi reveals that a new sprout has grown from the tree.
17	"The Finest Hospitality!? Chiyu's Hostess Training"; Transliteration: "Saikō no Omote Nashi!? Chiyu no Okami Shugyō" (Japanese: 最高のおもてなし！？ちゆのおかみ修行)	Takao Iwai	Mutsumi Itō	July 26, 2020
Chiyu offers to help out at her family's inn for the weekend and learns about the importance of good hospitality from her mother and grandmother. She also meets an English-speaking family with a young daughter named Emily, who is staying at the inn. Chiyu takes the three sight-seeing, but notices that Emily seems unhappy despite showing interest in the local park. Chiyu learns from Emily that she is moving to Japan, but is worried about not having any friends. Chiyu promises to take her to the park the next day, but there Shindoine creates a Megabyogen from a Rain Spirit to attack the park, but the girls transform and manage to defeat it, with the Rain Spirit giving Chiyu the Rain Element Bottle. The next day, Chiyu takes Emily to the park with Nodoka and Hinata to play, and Emily is able to make friends before leaving with a smile.
18	"Hearts Aflutter! A Grateful Nyatoran"; Transliteration: "Hāto ni Zukkyun! Nyatoran no Ongaeshi" (Japanese: ハートにズッキュン！ニャトランの恩返し)	Takayuki Murakami	Sawako Hirabayashi	August 2, 2020
On his way to Nodoka's house, Nyatoran comes across an aromatherapy shop and falls in love with its owner, causing him to injure himself. The owner, Ms. Orie, takes him to Hinata's family clinic, where Hinata identifies Nyatoran as her pet cat. Nyatoran admits to the others that he likes Ms. Orie, which causes Rabirin to worry that he might change his partner, but Hinata shows surprising encouragement for him. To repay Ms. Orie for her kindness, the girls offer to help her with the shop. Nyatoran eventually decides to make Ms. Orie a gift to express his feelings. However Batetemoda creates a Megabyogen from a Fire Spirit to attack the shop, so the girls transform to fight it. Cure Sparkle is injured while defending Nyatoran's gift, but the two come to realize that they have mutual feelings for each other and carry on fighting. The Cures manage to defeat the Megabyogen and rescue the Fire Spirit, who gives Hinata the Fire Element Bottle. Afterwards, as Hinata is about to give Ms. Orie Nyatoran's gift, a man named Mr. Kusaka appears and reveals that he and Ms. Orie are married. Although he is downhearted, Nyatoran confesses he is happy that Ms. Orie is smiling again and Hinata comforts him. Suddenly, to everyone's horror, Latte falls ill.
19	"Protect Latte...! The Wind of Prayers and The Girl of Miracles"; Transliteration: "Rate o Mamotte...! Inori no Kaze to Kiseki no Shōjo" (Japanese: ラテを守って…！祈りの風と奇跡の少女)	Takatoya Ippo	Junkō Komura	August 9, 2020
The girls take Latte to Hinata's family clinic, where Hinata's brother examines her and deduces that she is suffering from a cold. He gives Latte medicine and instructs Nodoka to give her plenty of rest. Everyone helps out to look after Latte, leading her to confess to Nodoka that she feels useless, to which Nodoka reassures her she isn't. However, due to her illness Latte is unable to sense when Batetemoda creates a Megabyogen from a Wind Spirit. By the time the girls discover it, it has already managed to grow incredibly powerful. The girls transform but are easily overpowered. Latte, feeling that it's all her fault, attempts to stop the Megabyogen on her own, but is captured by Batetemoda. Queen Teatine, sensing that something is wrong, begs the Earth to save her daughter. Suddenly a mysterious new Cure appears and saves Latte and the Cures, allowing them to purify the Megabyogen and save the Wind Spirit. Afterwards, the new Cure uses the Wind Element Bottle to heal Latte, though she is still not fully healed, while the other Cures wonder who she is...
20	"Now, With Our Combined Wish...! We Are Cure Earth"; Transliteration: "Ima, Tsunagaru Negai...! Watashitachi Kyua Āsu" (Japanese: 今、つながる願い…！わたしたちキュアアース)	Akiko Seki	Junkō Komura	August 16, 2020
The girls ask the new Pretty Cure who she is, with the Healing Animals commenting she looks exactly like the original Pretty Cure from long ago. However, the new Pretty Cure tells them she was created from the power of the Earth and Queen Teatine's wish to protect Latte, and is not a human but more like a fairy. She also reveals she has no name, so the girls refer to her as Earth. Earth then proceeds to take Latte back to the Healing Garden to fulfil her duty of protecting her. However, the others try to convince her not to leave, with Nodoka asking her to listen to Latte's feelings. Meanwhile, Batetemoda makes a deal with King Byogen to become leader of the Byogen generals if he defeats the Pretty Cure. Batetemoda manages to obtain crystallized fragments from the previous Megabyogen, but Guaiwaru confiscates all but one of them. Batetemoda creates a Megabyogen from a Sun Spirit and powers it up using his remaining crystal. The girls transform but struggle to defeat the powered-up Megabyogen. Earth, having listened to Latte, uses her Element Bottle to transform into Cure Earth and uses her Earth Windy Harp to perform Healing Hurricane and purify both the Megabyogen and Batetemoda, killing the latter for good. Afterwards, the girls decide to give Earth a proper name and name her Asumi Fuurin.
21	"Nice To Meet You! I'm Fuurin Asumi"; Transliteration: "Hajimemashite! Watakushi, Fūrin Asumi desu" (Japanese: はじめまして！わたくし、風鈴アスミです)	Junji Shimizu	Junkō Komura	August 23, 2020
Nodoka decides to let Asumi stay with her to be close to Latte, telling her parents that Asumi is Latte's owner and has traveled to Japan from abroad. Nodoka helps Asumi to understand Earth customs, as she was born recently and finds everything new and strange. The next day, Nodoka injures herself protecting Asumi; when Asumi asks her why she goes to so much trouble to help out, Nodoka tells her that her experiences from being ill changed her and she wanted to repay others' kindness. Meanwhile, Daruizen creates a Megabyogen from a Flower Spirit, and Guaiwaru reveals it can be powered up using the crystals he took from Batetemoda, which they call Mega Parts. Daruizen discovers they can harvest more parts from the powered up Megabyogen. The girls arrive and transform to defeat the Megabyogen, with Cure Earth protecting Cure Grace from Daruizen. After Cure Earth purifies the Megabyogen and frees the Flower Spirit, Asumi tells Nodoka that she hopes her own experiences change her.
22	"Please Don't Run Away, Latte! A Disappearing Body And Blooming Feelings"; Transliteration: "Rate Nigenaide! Kieru Karada to Mebaeru Kimochi" (Japanese: ラテ逃げないで！消える体と芽生える気持ち)	Hiroyuki Kakudō	Mutsumi Itō	August 30, 2020
Asumi begins to settle into life on Earth, but she becomes overprotective of Latte, causing Latte to avoid her and Asumi to begin fading. Chiyu takes Asumi to her family inn and discovers that she becomes solid again when she experiences things she likes. However, as Asumi has no real concept of emotions, Chiyu tries to explain it to her. The next day, the girls go to watch Chiyu at a sports event, where Asumi notices Chiyu continuously attempting the high jump despite failing. Chiyu explains that she tries so hard because she likes it. Suddenly, Shindoine appears and creates a Megabyogen from a Water Spirit, then powers it up with a Mega Part that Daruizen gave her before harvesting more parts from it. Nodoka, Chiyu and Hinata transform to fight while Asumi goes to find Latte. Asumi realizes that she was overprotective of Latte because she likes her and promises to take Latte's feelings into consideration in the future. Asumi then transforms and defeats the Megabyogen, freeing the Water Spirit.
23	"What is "Cute"? The Story Of Asumi And The Puppy"; Transliteration: "Kawaī tte Nan Desu ka? Asumi to Koinu Monogatari" (Japanese: かわいいってなんですか？アスミと子犬物語)	Takao Iwai	Sawako Hirabayashi	September 6, 2020
Hinata buys clothes for Asumi to try on in front of Nodoka and Chiyu. All three girls comment on how cute Asumi looks, but Asumi doesn't know what "cute" means, as it's another emotion she has yet to experience. Hinata attempts to explain it, but is called to look after a new foster puppy at her family's clinic. Hinata explains that the puppy is named Pocchito and is very timid. To get Pocchito to open up, Hinata plans to take him to a dog park. Everyone accompanies her and Pocchito to the park, where Hinata explains to Asumi the difficulties of getting Pocchito to trust her. Asumi also witnesses how owners interact with their dogs and unsuccessfully tries to befriend Pocchito. Suddenly, Guaiwaru appears and creates a Megabyogen from a Fruit Spirit and powers it up to gather more Mega Parts. The girls transform, but the Megabyogen overpowers all of them except Cure Earth. Pocchito tries to defend Cure Sparkle, but Cure Earth saves him before purifying the Megabyogen and freeing the Fruit Spirit. Afterwards, Asumi reveals she has come to understand her new feelings through her experience at the dog park, before finally befriending with Pocchito.
24	"We're Coming! Healing On The Wind"; Transliteration: "Ima Ikimasu! Oteate o Kaze ni Nosete" (Japanese: いま行きます！お手当てを風に乗せて)	Hideki Hiroshima	Mitsutaka Hirota	September 13, 2020
Hinata shows the girls a magazine article about a cafe in the next town and asks if they want to go. The article also shows a secluded lake nearby, which gets Asumi's attention. Nodoka decides that should visit the lake, as it's Asumi's first outing. At the lake, the girls meet an arborist named Sakuya Itsuki, who tells them about her work with nature, which impresses Asumi. That night, Daruizen uses a Mega Part on a bird the girls rescued earlier to create a new general. The next day, Latte senses that the lake is in trouble and Asumi creates a portal to transport everyone there. The girls find Sakuya unconscious and the new general, Nebusoku, infecting the lake and the surrounding forest. The girls transform and use Nebusoku's fear of flying to defeat him, with Cure Earth purifying him.
25	"Be Brave! Pegitan Is Trapped"; Transliteration: "Yūki o Dashite! Toraware no Pegitan" (Japanese: 勇気を出して！とらわれのペギタン)	Takayuki Murakami	Ryūnosuke Kingetsu	September 20, 2020
Pegitan becomes scared after watching a TV drama, causing Chiyu to reassure him that there's nothing to worry about before telling him how cute he is. However, Pegitan feels insulted by the comment, as he wants to act brave for Chiyu, and runs away. While he is thinking about what to do, a young girl named Riri encounters Pegitan and takes him home. Pegitan tries to escape and return to Chiyu, but learns that Riri struggles with being alone, as she has recently transferred schools and her mother works late. Pegitan tries to help out by following Riri to school, only for one of the other students to catch him. However, this gives Riri the courage to save Pegitan, and some of the other students help her, becoming her friends. After school, Riri thanks Pegitan for his help when Chiyu and the others turn up. Riri, not wanting to lose Pegitan, runs home with him before Chiyu can catch up with her. Shindoine creates a Megabyogen from a Gem Spirit, and Chiyu leaves Nodoka, Hinata, and Asumi to fight it while she gets Pegitan back. Riri locks Pegitan in her room, but he escapes after telling her she doesn't need him and that she is already brave. Pegitan returns to Chiyu and she transforms into Cure Fontaine before joining the other Cures and purifying the Megabyogen, freeing the Gem Spirit. Afterwards, Chiyu takes Pegitan back to Riri's house so he can continue visiting her.
26	"Surprise! Asumi and Latte's Diary"; Transliteration: "Bikkuri! Asumi no Rate Nikki" (Japanese: びっくり！アスミのラテ日記)	Takatoya Ippo	Kaori Kaneko	September 27, 2020
Hinata turns up late to meet Nodoka and the others and scare them, but is shocked to learn that Asumi doesn't display surprise like the others. Later on Asumi finds Nodoka in her garden making a diary of a Morning Glory plant she is looking after, and decides to make a diary of Latte's development to show Queen Teatine. Asumi goes around asking everyone about how they become Pretty Cure, but is surprised to find everyone is busy and being secretive. She also learns of a fireworks festival that evening and believes that everyone is avoiding her to go to the festival without her. This causes Asumi to begin fading, but Nodoka arrives and leads her to a festival just for her, revealing they planned to surprise her. Asumi is grateful for the gesture and watches the fireworks with her friends.
27	"Fly The Balloon! Asumi and Latte's Hot Feelings"; Transliteration: "Kikyū yo Tonde! Asumi to Rate no Atsui Omoi" (Japanese: 気球よ飛んで！アスミとラテの熱い想い)	Masato Mikami	Mutsumi Itō	October 4, 2020
Nodoka's father takes her and Asumi to a hot-air balloon race to watch the team from his former college compete. Asumi learns about the feeling of passion, and she and Latte decide to cheer the team on. However, when the team loses the first race, Asumi learns about the feeling of frustration, but vows to help them win the next race by predicting the wind's direction. Everything goes well, but when the team is about to finish, Guaiwaru appears and creates a Megabyogen from an Air Spirit, powering it up with multiple Mega Parts. The Megabyogen proves to be too strong for the Cures, but Cure Earth utilizes the wind's direction to trap it in a vortex before purifying it. Afterwards, the freed Air Spirit gives Asumi the Air Element Bottle. Later while everyone is enjoying Hinata's pancakes, Nodoka hears a sound in the forest nearby and goes to investigate. She finds Daruizen about to use a Mega Part on a crow and transforms into Cure Grace to confront him. However, Daruizen gets an idea and uses the Mega Part on Cure Grace, knocking her unconscious.
28	"In Pain Again!? Daruizen, Are You?"; Transliteration: "Kurushimi no Sairai!? Daruizen, Anata Wa" (Japanese: 苦しみの再来！？ダルイゼン、あなたは)	Yuriko Kado	Junkō Komura	October 11, 2020
After Daruizen infects Cure Grace, the other Cures arrive to rescue her but are too late. They take Nodoka to her parents, who rush her to the hospital while revealing that her current illness similar to her previous one. The girls wonder if Nodoka was infected by a Mega Part before, with the Healing Animals revealing that the Byogen generals were created from Megabyogens which evolved to their most advanced stage. The girls visit Nodoka at the hospital and witness the Megabyogen being purged from her body through her and Rabirin's combined efforts. After pursuing the Megabyogen, they find that Daruizen is waiting for it to evolve, and everyone is surprised when it becomes a Byogen named Kedary, who greatly resembles Daruizen. Kedary proves to be very strong, but Cure Earth uses the Air Element Bottle to trap him, allowing the Cures to purify him using Healing Oasis and kill him for good. After the fight, Daruizen reveals to Cure Grace that he remembers how he came into being: he was born from Nodoka after Megabyogen seed infected her, causing her initial illness. This revelation shocks her, but she resolves to do something about him.
29	"Nodoka In Distress? Let's Find Something Refreshing"; Transliteration: "Nodoka no Sutoresu? Kibun Tenkan o Sagase♪" (Japanese: のどかのストレス？気分転換をさがせ♪)	Junji Shimizu	Sawako Hirabayashi	October 18, 2020
Asumi notices that Nodoka has begun running and eating more. After discussing it with the Healing Animals, they conclude that Nodoka is stressed after the revelations of her illness and is finding ways to relieve it. But Asumi and the Animals feel that she is overdoing it, so they decide to find a different way for her to relieve her stress. Meanwhile, Nodoka meets a classmate named Kotoe Kanemori, who is a member of the school's band. She was home recovering from a cold, but has since returned to school; however, she appears to be overdoing her trumpet practice to catch up with everyone else. This causes the band leader Yuto Sugawara to scold her, telling her not to rush and that the success of the band does not solely lie on her shoulders. After school, Nodoka, Chiyu, and Hinata meet up with Asumi and the Animals, who reveal what they've been doing, causing Nodoka to become defensive. Suddenly, Guaiwaru appears and creates a Megabyogen from a Sound Spirit, powering it up with multiple Mega Parts. The girls transform to fight it, but Cure Grace becomes reckless and is almost crushed before Cure Earth saves her. Earth gets Grace to admit that she felt responsible for being involved in Daruizen's creation, which is why she has been trying to get stronger. However, Earth reassures her it isn't her fault and that she can rely on the others for support. The girls manage to defeat and purify the Megabyogen, after which the purified Sound Spirit gives Asumi the Sound Element Bottle to heal Latte.
30	"The Group Is So Different? The Day At The Zoo"; Transliteration: "Kyara ga Barabara? Dōbutsuen no Kyūjitsu" (Japanese: キャラがバラバラ？動物園の休日)	Akiko Seki	Mutsumi Itō	October 25, 2020
The girls spend the day at the zoo, where they meet a boy named Kota who offers to show them around. Kota is the son of Nodoka, Chiyu and Hinata's homeroom teacher Kyousei Maruyama, who had a fight with his friend Shuichi because they had differing opinions on lions and tigers. However, Kota learns from the girls that being different can be a good thing and make friendships stronger, and he manages to reconcile with Shuichi. Meanwhile, King Byogen praises Guaiwaru and Daruizen for discovering Mega Parts, leaving Shindoine jealous. Daruizen goes to the zoo and creates a Megabyogen from a Leaf Spirit to collect more parts. The girls transform to fight the Megabyogen and manage to purify it, but Daruizen successfully harvests more parts from it. However, Shindoine gets an idea to use a Mega Part on herself, making her more powerful. She decides to test her new strength by using a Nanobyogen to infect Kota, but Kyousei Maruyama steps in the way and is infected instead.
31	"The Byogens Have Evolved! The Treatment Is The Healin' Good Arrow!"; Transliteration: "Byōgenzu no Shinka! Oteate wa Hīrin Guddo♥Arō!" (Japanese: ビョーゲンズの進化！お手当てはヒーリングっど♥アロー！)	Takao Iwai	Junkō Komura	November 8, 2020
The Cures discover what Shindoine has done to Kyousei Maruyama after Latte becomes ill again. Shindoine reveals that she evolved herself using a Mega Part and can now create Gigabyogens from living beings. The Cures attempt to fight the Gigabyogen but are easily defeated, so Shindoine leaves to show King Byogen her new powers. During the brief respite, Nodoka, Chiyu, Hinata, and Asumi regroup and find Kota in the zoo, with Kota distraught after witnessing his father turn into a monster. However, Nodoka reassures Kota that the Pretty Cure will save his father. When Latte senses the Gigabyogen's return, the girls go to face it, but are unable to purify the monster with Healing Oasis. Determined not to give up, Nodoka rallies the other Cures and they fight the Gigabyogen again. Their determination causes the power of their Element Bottles to combine and create a new Bottle. Latte combines their powers into one, creating the Healin' Good Arrow. The Cures use their new power to perform Final Healin' Good Shower to purify the Gigabyogen and rescue Kyousei Maruyama.
32	"Just Like My Sister! My Innkeeper Training"; Transliteration: "Onēchan Mitai ni! Boku no Okami Shugyō" (Japanese: おねえちゃんみたいに！ぼくのおかみ修行)	Hiroyuki Kakudō	Mutsumi Itō	November 15, 2020
Nodoka and Hinata join some of their classmates for work experience at Chiyu's family inn. Joining them is Asumi and Chiyu's little brother Toji, who hopes to become more like his sister. Chiyu instructs Toji and her friends on good hospitality, but Toji struggles when his hard work and kindness cause him to get into troublesome situations, leading Chiyu to scold him. Pegitan, who had secretly watched Toji, asks Asumi to encourage him, which Chiyu overhears. Suddenly Guaiwaru appears, having powered himself up using a Mega Part like Shindoine, and transforms one of the inn guests, Mr. Chikara, into a Gigabyogen. The girls transform to fight it while everyone else evacuates the inn. During the fight, Toji tries to rescue a puppy but Cure Fontaine saves him. She uses the Ice Bottle to subdue the Gigabyogen with help from Cure Earth before the Cures purify it using Final Healin' Good Shower. Afterwards, the puppy is revealed to be Mr. Chikara's, who thanks Toji for rescuing it. Chiyu also expresses how proud she is of her little brother.
33	"A Reunion Full Of Memories! The Gift My Past Self Left Behind"; Transliteration: "Omoide no Saikai! Kako no Watashi no Okurimono" (Japanese: 思い出の再会！過去のわたしの贈りもの)	Toshinori Fukasawa	Junkō Komura	November 22, 2020
King Byogen forces Daruizen to power up using Mega Parts; despite being reluctant to do so, Daruizen complies. Meanwhile, Dr. Hachisuka visits Nodoka, having looked after her while she was sick. Nodoka introduces Dr. Hachisuka to her new friends, and he is grateful that she is doing well. At dinner, Dr. Hachisuka reveals that he quit his job at the hospital after he failed to cure Nodoka. Nodoka becomes upset and asks Rabirin if she can reveal the Byogens' existence, but Rabirin dissuades her. Dr. Hachisuka goes for a walk with Nodoka and explains that he changed careers to become a researcher who studies new illnesses to find a cure, and that Nodoka's encouragement motivated him to do so, making Nodoka feel better. The next day, Dr. Hachisuka leaves after he and Nodoka promise to see each other again. However, he comes across Daruizen, who turns him into a Gigabyogen. After Latte senses that Dr. Hachisuka is in trouble, the girls transform and try to rescue him. During the fight, Daruizen engages Cure Grace, asking her what benefit working for others gives, but Grace is able to push him back before helping the others purify the Gigabyogen. Afterwards, Nodoka watches Dr. Hachisuka leave, reaffirming her promise to meet him again when she grows up and the Pretty Cures' resolve to protect the world against the Byogens.
34	"I'm My Own Rival!? The Wings Chiyu Desires"; Transliteration: "Watashi ga Raibaru!? Chiyu no Motometa Tsubasa" (Japanese: わたしがライバル！？ちゆの求めたツバサ)	Takayuki Murakami	Mitsutaka Hirota	November 29, 2020
At a national sports event, Chiyu takes first place in the high jump, breaking the current record. This causes her to be asked to interview the second place competitor, Tsubasa Takami. After the interview, Tsubasa asks Chiyu if she will be competing in the international event, but Chiyu declines. This angers Tsubasa, who reveals her passion for the high jump and feels Chiyu isn't taking her talent seriously. Chiyu becomes upset and confides in the others, who tell her she can do things her own way. The next day at school, Chiyu attempts to break her high jump record and finds she was able to do it because of Tsubasa. Chiyu runs off to find Tsubasa, but learns from her school friends that she has left to move abroad. Chiyu manages to track Tsubasa down at the sports arena, where she is saying goodbye, until Shindoine appears and turns her into a Gigabyogen. Chiyu transforms into Cure Fontaine and battles Shindoine before helping the other Cures defeat and purify the Gigabyogen. Afterwards, Chiyu tells Tsubasa she plans to go to the international sports event and hopes that they can compete against each other again one day.
35	"Throw It With Your Hands! Treat The Ball Connected To Your Youth!"; Transliteration: "Te to Te de Tosu! Bōru Tsunaide Seishun Oteate!" (Japanese: 手と手でトス！ボールつないで青春お手当て！)	Tsuyoshi Tobita	Sawako Hirabayashi	December 6, 2020
After Rabirin, Latte, and Asumi watch a volleyball television show, the three decide to take the others out to play beach volleyball. The Healing Animals and the four girls head to a deserted island on a beach volleyball camp. While the others have fun playing, Nodoka struggles to keep up with the other three girls. Meanwhile, Guaiwaru arrives on the other side of the island and infects a Tree Spirit to create a Megabyogen which he subjects to intense sports training. As a result, latte does not detect the Byogens' presence until the Megabyogen initiates its rampage. The girls transform to engage the Megabyogen, but it proves to be a formidable foe, with Guaiwaru having taught it volleyball moves. Cure Grace, despite initially failing to pass the Megabyogen's attacks, rallies the Cures before successfully deflecting the monster's attack. All four Cures work together to defeat the Megabyogen before Cure Grace purifies it and the Tree Spirit. After the battle, the girls decide to play beach volleyball again another time.
36	"Gloomy Natasha. Our Special Study Camp"; Transliteration: "Natāsha no Yūutsu o Benkyō Daisakusen!" (Japanese: ナターシャのゆううつ お勉強大作戦！)	Takatoya Ippo	Ryūnosuke Kingetsu	December 13, 2020
At school, the girls receive the results of their last test; Nodoka is thrilled to have improved since last time, while Chiyu aces it. However, Hinata scores low and reveals she struggles with studying since she is easily distracted. She realizes she was supposed to meet a friend and runs off to see Eriko, who moved away when she was in elementary school. Hinata begins telling Eriko about her new friends, but Eriko suddenly storms off. Hinata feels that they have grown apart and begins to worry about her friendship with Nodoka and Chiyu, so she decides to try and study harder. The girls offer to have a study sleepover to help Hinata, but Hinata still struggles to remain focused. She receives a message from Eriko asking to meet up the following day. Hinata meets up with Eriko but they are interrupted by Shindoine and a Megabyogen created from a Tree Spirit. Eriko takes Hinata to safety, leaving the girls to fight the monster. While hiding, Eriko confesses to Hinata that she became jealous when Hinata told her about her new friends, but that she wanted to see her regardless. The Megabyogen finds the two girls, but Cure Grace rescues them. Cure Earth takes Eriko to safety to allow Hinata to transform and help the others defeat the Megabyogen and purify the Tree Spirit. Afterwards, Hinata realizes her friendships will last and decides not to worry about losing her friends.
37	"Enjoy The Seasons! Hospitality Tour For Latte!"; Transliteration: "Kisetsu o Enjoi♥Rate-sama Omotenashi Tsuā!" (Japanese: 季節をエンジョイ♥ラテ様おもてなしツアー！)	Takao Iwai	Kaori Kaneko	December 20, 2020
Asumi reveals to Nodoka that she has gotten a part-time job, while the Healing animals decide to have an adventure with Latte. They go around town and participate in their own secret events, such as sports and art. They learn from the Elemental Spirits about the different people in Sukoyaka who help care for the earth, such as a local farmer. The Animals soon realize that there will come a time when they are no longer needed and become upset at the prospect of leaving their human partners. Suddenly, Daruizen appears and taunts them before turning the farmer into a Giganyogen. Latte manages to escape and warn the girls, allowing them to reach the Animals in time and transform. While battling the Gigabyogen, the Animals realize that they can't be selfish and pull all their strength to defeat it and rescue the farmer. Afterwards, the Animals vow to help create a world that they can visit without needing to heal it.
38	"Innkeeper? High Jump? Chiyu's Inner Conflict!"; Transliteration: "Okami? Haijan? Yureru Chiyu no Kokoro!" (Japanese: 女将？ハイジャン？揺れるちゆの心！)	Hiroyuki Kakudō	Mutsumi Itō	December 27, 2020
When Toji expresses his interest in becoming an innkeeper so that Chiyu can pursue her dream of becoming a high jump champion, Chiyu begins to doubt what she really wants. Chiyu acts distracted the entire day, something her friends take note of, so Pegitan explains the situation to them. When Latte finds the banner that Nodoka and Hinata made to cheer on Chiyu, Pegitan gets an idea and goes to find her. But before Pegitan can explain, Shindoine creates a Gigabyogen from a surfer at the beach. Chiyu transforms into Cure Fontaine and battles the monster until the other Cures show up. After a brief confrontation with Shindoine, Pegitan tells Chiyu that she can pursue both her dreams, giving her the courage to overcome her doubts. Cure Fontaine helps the other Cures defeat the monster and afterwards tells her family her decision, which they support.
39	"The Final Battle At Last!? Fly To The Byogen Kingdom!"; Transliteration: "Tsui ni Kessen!? Tobikome! Byōgen Kingudamu!" (Japanese: ついに決戦！？とびこめ！ビョーゲンキングダム！)	Junji Shimizu	Ryūnosuke Kingetsu	January 10, 2021
Hinata accidentally discovers the portal to the Byogen Kingdom, which Guaiwaru left open, and tells her friends. Fearing a trap, the girls discuss with their partners the prospect of using the portal to go fight King Byogen. After a reluctant debate, the group decides to go before the portal closes. In the Byogen Kingdom, they encounter King Byogen, who fights Cure Earth before creating Byogen monsters to fight the other Cures. Although the monsters and King Byogen prove too strong at first, the Cures' determination allows them to overcome and purify them. Having apparently defeated King Byogen, the girls celebrate, only for their celebration to be interrupted. Guaiwaru appears and thanks them for getting rid of King Byogen for him, before revealing the fight isn't over.
40	"The Birth of Hinata's Regrets! King Guaiwaru"; Transliteration: "Hinata no Kōkai... Tanjō! Kingu Guaiwaru" (Japanese: ひなたの後悔… 誕生！キンググアイワル)	Akiko Seki	Sawako Hirabayashi	January 17, 2021
Guaiwaru reveals his plans and enhances himself using multiple Mega Parts, strengthening himself further and anointing himself king. The Cures attempt to fight Guaiwaru, but he overpowers all of them. Cure Sparkle feels guilty for falling into Guaiwaru's trap and leading everyone else into trouble, causing her to de-transform. Guaiwaru prepares to finish her off, only for Cure Earth to cover their tracks and evade him. While hiding in a quiet location, the girls discuss how to escape from the Byogen Kingdom. Hinata tearfully expresses her regrets to the others, blaming herself for her current failure and believing she still fails no matter how hard she tries. The others comfort her, stating that she does not need to feel responsible for that failure. Latte then senses a hole that Hinata made; everyone realizes they can use it to make a portal back to their world. After transforming again, the four Cures use Final Healin' Good Shower to make their own portal and successfully escape through it despite Daruizen's interference. Upon arriving back on Earth, they discover that Guaiwaru infected most of Sukoyaka City while they were trapped in the Byogen Kingdom. Her morale renewed, Cure Sparkle resolves to purify the town with everything they have, to which the other Cures agree.
41	"Crisis in Sukoyaka City! The King's Shadow Draws Near"; Transliteration: "Sukoyaka-shi no Kiki!! Shinobiyoru Kingu no Kage" (Japanese: すこやか市の危機！！忍びよるキングの影)	Takao Iwai	Junkō Komura	January 24, 2021
Having escaped the Byogen Kingdom, the Cures begin purifying the Megabyogens around Sukoyaka City. With only a Gigabyogen left to fight, the Cures head to the forest park, where the citizens of Sukoyaka have taken refuge. Meanwhile, Daruizen informs Guaiwaru that the Pretty Cures have escaped, and they both leave to confront the Cures. Shindoine also joins them, and surprisingly appears to accept Guaiwaru as the new Byogen King. The Byogens manage to overpower the Cures, but before Guaiwaru can deal the final blow, Shindoine betrays him and King Byogen absorbs Guaiwaru's power to regain his body. King Byogen reveals that the Cures only destroyed part of his body and that he was aware of Guaiwaru's treachery. With Shindoine's help, he planned to use him to regain his power and body. King Byogen then powers up the Gigabyogen and forces the Cures to fight it. The Cures manage to purify it, but find that King Byogen and his generals have disappeared, despite having the advantage. Afterwards, Nodoka and the others return home and reunite with their parents, who are thankful they are alright. Back in the Byogen Kingdom, King Byogen reveals his plan to use the Cures as bait and attempts to absorb Daruizen into his body. Daruizen flees and confronts Nodoka, pleading with her to let him hide in her body to recover, but Nodoka flees.
42	"Nodoka's Choice! Something to Protect"; Transliteration: "Nodoka no Sentaku! Mamoranakya Ikenai Mono" (Japanese: のどかの選択！守らなきゃいけないもの)	Yuriko Kado	Junkō Komura	January 31, 2021
Nodoka is still shaken by her last encounter with Daruizen, and her family and friends are concerned for her when she starts acting distant. Meanwhile, King Byogen tasks Shindoine with searching for Daruizen while Queen Teatine and her servants prepare to head to Earth. Rabirin approaches Nodoka, who confides in her of her guilt of abandoning Daruizen. Nodoka explains that she does not want to relive her experiences of being ill, even though it shaped her. Rabirin encourages Nodoka to release her true feelings, and with her encouragement Nodoka decides not to help Daruizen. Rabirin agrees, stating that she is not responsible for helping Daruizen and is responsible for maintaining her own health. Just then, Latte falls ill due to Daruizen enhancing himself with multiple Mega Parts and attacking the town's lighthouse, forcing Nodoka and Asumi to assemble their friends. The four girls transform to fight an evolved Daruizen, who attacks Cure Grace while 'asking' her to help him again. However, Grace, having her resolve renewed, refuses and stands up for herself. She proceeds to fight Daruizen before her comrades join her to purify him. However, Daruizen is not completely purified and King Byogen absorbs him, further evolving into Neo King Byogen. Despite the evil king's taunts, a fully motivated Cure Grace resolves to purify the king.
43	"King's Evolution! Sukoyaka City Has Been Infected"; Transliteration: "Kingu no Shinka...! Mushibamareta Sukoyaka-shi" (Japanese: キングの進化…！蝕まれたすこやか市)	Hiroyuki Kakudō	Junkō Komura	February 7, 2021
To the Cures' horror, Neo King Byogen uses his power to infect all of Sukoyaka City, with the resulting infection spreading worldwide. Determined to restore the city by purifying the king, the Cures attempt to engage Neo King Byogen but discover that a barrier is guarding him. He effortlessly defeats them, causing them to detransform. However, Queen Teatine arrives in time to aid the Cures; using her powers along with her fellow Healing Animals, she creates a barrier to contain Neo King Byogen and stop his infection temporarily. This gives the girls time to plan how to defeat him, but they are forced to flee when Shindoine attacks them, with Asumi using her wind powers to transport them outside of Teatine's barrier. During their moment of respite, Asumi reveals that by using the Byogens' power along with their own, they should be able to pass through Neo King Byogen's barrier. However, to do so Asumi must take in a Mega Part to use the Byogens' power. Despite initial protests, everyone agrees after seeing Asumi's resolve. Shindoine appears once again and the girls transform to fight her; despite powering herself using a Mega Part, they defeat her using Final Healin' Good Shower, restoring her to her original form. Latte tells them to use Healing Oasis to purify her further and allow Cure Earth to absorb her Byogen particle. Now with the ability to combat Neo King Byogen, the Cures prepare to face him.
44	"Let's Heal It Together!! For A Healthy Future"; Transliteration: "Minna de Oteate!! Sukoyaka na Mirai no Tame ni" (Japanese: みんなでお手当て！！すこやかな未来のために)	Toshinori Fukasawa	Junkō Komura	February 14, 2021
The four Cures return to the forcefield's area to fight and purify Neo King Byogen. When they battle the king again, Asumi initiates her plan and her attack manages to break through the king's barrier. However, Neo King Byogen, now with his full strength restored, breaks out of the Healing Animals' forcefield, absorbs the Cures, Queen Teatine, Latte, and the three Healing Animals, and uses his power to infect the entire world. Inside the king, Nodoka and her friends are apparently defeated. Neo King Byogen taunts Nodoka again, but Nodoka resolves to keep fighting to protect everyone from him, despite the insurmountable odds. Nodoka's speech motivates the others trapped inside and they resolve not to give up, as do the people of Sukoyaka City, the other Healing Animals, and millions more people worldwide. The four girls break free from the king and transform again to fight him once more. Despite Neo King Byogen's power, the four Cures manage to overpower him and purify him with Final Healin' Good Shower, destroying him once and for all. Following the battle, the townsfolk, having discovered the Cures' identities, agree among themselves to keep their discovery under wraps. Life goes on in Sukoyaka City, until Asumi and the Healing Animals announce to their friends they must return to the Healing Garden. The Healing Garden residents leave their companions in a tearful farewell, but not before promising to remain friends.
45	"Welcome! The Healing Garden"; Transliteration: "Oidemase♥Hīringu Gāden!" (Japanese: おいでませ♥ヒーリングガーデン！)	Yōko Ikeda	Junkō Komura	February 21, 2021
Rabirin, Pegitan and Nyatoran reunite with their companions to take them to the Healing Garden for a visit. There, the three girls reunite with Asumi, Latte and Queen Teatine; the queen thanks the girls for aiding them in protecting Earth against the Byogens. All three visitors befriend the other Garden residents, giving them some buns they brought along. However, they struggle to get along with a grumpy monkey named Saruro, who believes that humans are no better than the Byogens. As the four girls ponder over Saruro's words, several Megabyogen appear due to a wild Nanobyogen which hid in the bun containers. The girls transform to engage the Megabyogens, are overwhelmed until Latte summons a new Cure, Cure Summer, to the battle. With the Cure's assistance, the four Cures manage to defeat the Megabyogen pack and purify the Fruit Spirit trapped within them. Afterwards, the three apologize for their carelessness, but Queen Teatine assuages them, while Asumi reassures Saruro that humans can still fix the damage done to Earth. After leaving the Healing Garden, Nodoka, Chiyu, and Hinata resolve to continue healing the world for their lifetime.
