= List of 2.5 Dimensional Seduction episodes =

2.5 Dimensional Seduction is an anime television series based on the manga series of the same name by Yu Hashimoto. Originally announced on December 10, 2022, it was produced by J.C.Staff and directed by Hideki Okamoto, with scripts written by Takao Yoshioka, character designs handled by Tomoyuki Shitaya, and music composed by Hiroaki Tsutsumi. The series aired from July 5 to December 13, 2024, on Tokyo MX and other networks. For the first cour, the opening theme song is "Shutter Chance" (シャッターチャンス, Shattāchansu), performed by Meychan, while the ending theme song is "Watch Me", performed by Kaori Maeda and Akari Kitō as their respective characters. For the second cour, the opening theme song is "Tsugihagi no Tsubasa" (ツギハギの翼; "A Wing's Patchwork"), performed by Soraru, while the ending theme song is "Release Sigh", performed by Kaori Maeda, Akari Kitō, Sayumi Suzushiro and Sayumi Watabe as their respective characters. Sentai Filmworks licensed the series in North America, Australia and British Isles for streaming on Hidive.

Following the airing of the final episode of the first season, a second season was announced.

== Episodes ==
=== Season 1 (2024) ===
No.	Title (Note: All English titles are taken from Hidive.)	Directed by (Note: Production staff information is taken from the ending credits of each episode)	Storyboarded by	Original release date
1	"New Student from Another Dimension"; Transliteration: "Ijigen no Shinnyūsei" (Japanese: 異次元の新入生)	Kōzō Kaihō	Hideki Okamoto	July 5, 2024
Masamune Okumura is an otaku, president and only member of his high school's manga club where he worships a fictional character named Liliel. Such is his love for her that he completely ignores all real girls. One day, a first-year student named Lilysa Amano visits the club and is determined to join. Okumura attempts to deter her but she proves to be as much of an otaku as him, plus she too loves Liliel and wants to cosplay as her. Okumura decides to approve her club membership but is shocked when she starts stripping right in front of him so she can show off her Liliel costume. The next day, he struggles to deal with Lilysa before he realizes that she might just be the perfect otaku friend for him. This lasts only until the zipper gets stuck on her Liliel costume. While helping her, he ends up inadvertently holding her bare breast in his hand. At first she seems unaffected, but after Okumura flees in embarrassment, she is shown to have become excited, though she believes she is just coming down with a fever.
2	"Cosplay Group Potential?"; Transliteration: "Awase no Yokan" (Japanese: 併せの予感)	Makoto Sokuza	Hideki Okamoto	July 12, 2024
A model named Mikari Tachibana transfers into Lilysa's class. Later in the club room, Lilysa poses as a schoolgirl until she once again trips, this time with her panties in Okumura's face. She is thrilled at first until she remembers she is still wearing her real panties. After a while, Mikari confronts Okumura in the club room, who is revealed to be her childhood friend. Using the excuse she was accidentally soaked with water earlier, Mikari starts teasing him. When he remarks she has not changed, she becomes angry, having become a model just to get his attention, leading to another accident where Okumura falls on her. When this does not excite him, she realizes he is still obsessed with Liliel and leaves. Flashbacks show Okumura once saved her from bullies. However, even when she changed her appearance to better resemble Liliel, he continued to prefer the latter over her, so she spent years focused on her career but remained in love with him. Not giving up, she returns only to catch Okumura with Lilysa cosplaying as Liliel. Mikari is upset until Lilysa bluntly asks her to cosplay together for their next photoshoot.
3	"Lili × Miri"; Transliteration: "Riri × Miri" (Japanese: リリ×ミリ)	Yuki Morita	Hideki Tonokatsu	July 19, 2024
Mikari impulsively agrees to cosplay to prevent anything happening between Okumura and Lilysa. She insists on cosplaying as Liliel to attract Okumura. However, when Lilysa strips, Mikari changes her mind. Instead, she cosplays as Liliel's friend, the demoness Miriella. Lilysa creates a Miriella costume but it is obvious that Okumura still prefers Liliel. Desperate for his attention, Mikari poses in a way that highlights her butt, which she happily misinterprets when he blurts out he loves her. Mikari is unprepared for the level of lewdness Lilysa demands in their photos but goes along with it hoping to arouse Okumura. When their costumes become tangled, Okumura ends up seeing both of their breasts and passes out. Mikari realizes if she wants any chance with Okumura, she needs to learn to enjoy manga as much as he does. Mikari reveals that as a professional model the photos of her cannot legally be used in Lilysa's cosrom. Fortunately, Lilysa already has enough photos of herself but editing them will take almost two full days and involves hiding in the school overnight to use the computer. While avoiding security, Okumura inadvertently arouses Lilysa when he covers her mouth.
4	"Time for Our First Event!"; Transliteration: "Iza Hatsu Ibento!" (Japanese: いざ初イベント!)	Yōhei Suzuki, Makoto Sokuza	Iku Suzuki	July 26, 2024
With the cosrom finished, Okumura and Lilysa plan to attend a cosplay event. Mikari demands to know how Lilysa feels about Okumura, inadvertently helping Lilysa realize she might have a crush on him. Panicking that the event might count as a date, Lilysa has Mikari choose her clothes. Meanwhile, Okumura also panics, fearing Lilysa wanted it to be a date. After the initial awkwardness, however, they watch an anime together until the event begins. Lilysa admits she forgot to create covers for the cosrom DVDs or advertising posters, so their booth comes across as amateur, especially since a nearby booth is run by Magino, a professional cosplayer, and Ogino, her photographer. Luckily, they are friendly and offer advice. Lilysa is too embarrassed to cosplay as Liliel so she and Okumura attract zero customers. Okumura experiences jealousy at other people seeing Lilysa in costume but when she becomes upset about the situation, he convinces her to cosplay. In the changing room, Lilysa finds she forgot several parts of her costume and despairs only to receive unexpected help from the other cosplayers. Despite the event ending soon, Lilysa's sudden appearance causes a stir among the audience.
5	"First Event Is Over!!"; Transliteration: "Hatsu Ibento Shūryou!!" (Japanese: 初イベント終了!!)	Atsuji Kaneko	Kōichi Takada	August 2, 2024
So many people swarm Lilysa that Ogino organizes a proper photoshoot. Lilysa cannot decide how to pose and accidentally flashes her modesty briefs but soon gets the hang of it. According to a cosplay reviewer, Liliel herself has come alive. Lilysa remembers how her mother does not support her hobby, but when she sees Okumura in the audience, she strikes her final pose just for him. Many in the audience notice the pose mirrors the one Liliel used to confess her love. Afterward, the cosplayers share their cosplay horror stories, which includes Lilysa's complaint that there are many characters she cannot cosplay due to her big bust, limiting her to either embarrassing skimpy costumes or baggy clothes that make her look fat. One of the cosplayers shares the bad news that Mayura, a famous cosplayer and one of Lilysa's inspirations, has retired. Despite this, Lilysa is determined to see her new friends cosplaying at Summer Comiket. While heading home, Lilysa suddenly admits she is often confused around Okumura but has finally realized she loves having him as her photographer. Okumura, having been expecting a confession, dives straight into denial by faking relief.
6	"Senpai's Secret Special Training!?"; Transliteration: "Senpai no Himitsu Tokkun!?" (Japanese: 先輩の秘密特訓!?)	Kōzō Kaihō	Shinpei Nagai	August 9, 2024
Mikari is relieved to learn that Lilysa loves Okumura as a friend. While in the hallway, Lilysa meets a new teacher. Meanwhile, when Okumura witnesses Mikari wearing Lilysa's Liliel costume, she uses the opportunity to seduce him. However, his respect for Liliel causes him to refuse. Lilysa walks in on them but rather than become upset, she enjoys seeing Liliel herself. Okumura later spends a day with Ogino and Magino to improve his photography. Recognizing that Okumura struggles to take sexy pictures, Magino advises him to discuss his preferences instead of repressing them unhealthily. Ogino soon tells him of the Four Heavenly Queens of Cosplay: Erika, 753♡, Yoki, and Mayura. As Mayura has retired, her fans are hoping she will be replaced and many are hoping it will be the unknown Liliel cosplayer, Lilysa. Having learned a lot, Okumura manages to take better quality photos of Lilysa, with the latter hoping that they continue to improve together so they can have even more fun. Just then, the student council suddenly informs Okumura that due to lack of members, the club room is going to be given to another club.
7	"We Need an Advisor!"; Transliteration: "Komon no Sensei ga Hitsuyō Desu" (Japanese: 顧問の先生が必要です)	Shūji Miyazaki	Shūji Miyazaki	August 16, 2024
The student council informs Okumura that the manga club needs to submit reports and recruit an advisor to maintain their club and room. When Okumura eventually approaches a new teacher named Mayuri Hanyu, he recognizes her as Mayura. She is initially furious about being discovered until she learns the manga club actually focuses on cosplay. She admits that while she still loves cosplay, she retired to pursue a professional career. When she meets Lilysa, she immediately falls in love with Lilysa's cosplay and is embarrassed when Lilysa, who does not recognize her, claims Mayura is her idol. As such, Mayuri agrees to be their advisor. Next, Okumura must fabricate a report that seems legitimate to hide their cosplay activities from the council. Mayuri advises Okumura and Lilysa to read manga to schoolchildren, which counts as both a club activity and volunteer work. This is a huge success when Lilysa reads in character as Liliel. Mayuri later talks to her friend Eli about her regret over quitting cosplay before she had a chance to wear the best costume she ever made. Mayuri is shocked when Okumura and Lilysa suddenly throw away the fake manga report.
8	"Do You Love Cosplay?"; Transliteration: "Kosupure o Aishiteru?" (Japanese: コスプレを愛してる？)	Kōzō Kaihō, Nana Fujiwara	Iku Suzuki	August 23, 2024
Okumura and Lilysa explain they do not want to hide their cosplay anymore. Instead, they plan to attend YokoSuka and write their report on that. While Mayuri initially fears they will face ridicule, Lilysa's determination causes her to change her mind. However, she cautions that for the report they will need photos showing Lilysa as the most popular cosplayer. Elsewhere, a female otaku has no interest in real men and worships the character Prince Kai. Ogino warns being popular will be difficult as 753♡ will be cosplaying a character who has recently gone viral, plus she has official sponsorships. 753♡ is later revealed to be the female otaku. At YokoSuka, all the attention is on 753♡ in Hall B, while Lilysa and Magino are in Hall A, which is almost completely deserted. Lilysa is shocked to meet 753♡, who reveals she does not care which character she cosplays as, she just loves cosplay itself. Lilysa soon encounters some of the cosplayers she previously met. Ogino explains to attract the most people, they should position themselves by the exit of Hall B after 753♡'s show ends. Meanwhile, Lilysa's meeting with 753♡ has upset her.
9	"You're Not Liliel!"; Transliteration: "Kimi wa Ririeru Janai" (Japanese: キミはリリエルじゃない)	Yuki Morita	Shinpei Nagai	August 30, 2024
Mayuri attends YokoSuka incognito. Meanwhile, 753♡ is frustrated Lilysa reminds her of the more popular Mayura, so she deliberately undermined Lilysa's confidence out of petty jealousy. Elsewhere, Lilysa is too depressed to cosplay. 753♡ spots a man identical to Prince Kai and insists on staying in character for photos until she spots him again. Her sudden outdoor photoshoot ruins Okumura's plan to set up by Hall B's exit as the entire audience is now outside. Lilysa later feels even worse upon discovering Liliel's skirt is missing. Fearing she has disappointed everyone, Okumura tells Lilysa not to worry about the club room and to try remembering why she started loving cosplay. He then rushes off to find her skirt. When Mayuri tries to motivate Lilysa, she belatedly realizes why she became a teacher. She quickly changes into the costume she never wore and reveals to Lilysa that she is Mayura. Okumura reappears with the missing skirt and Lilysa realizes the only reason she needs to cosplay is because she loves it. With only a few minutes of YokoSuka remaining, Mayuri agrees to help Lilysa get ready quickly.
10	"Mayura vs. Nagomi!!"; Transliteration: "Mayura-sama VS Nagomi!!" (Japanese: まゆら様VS753!!)	Kōzō Kaihō	Hideki Tonokatsu	September 6, 2024
Okumura worries 753♡ will leave and YokoSuka will be over. Mayura suddenly appears, astounding everyone and stealing half of 753♡'s audience. Furious, 753♡ removes half her costume, making it as sexy as Mayura's to try and outdo her. Unfortunately, this just worsens her insecurity. Mayura remembers how happy 753♡ was prior to becoming a professional and regrets they never had a chance to become real friends. 753♡ is angry when Mayura abruptly leaves and is replaced by Liliel. Despite 753♡ cosplaying as a current popular character, Liliel was adored by the audience when they were children and her appearance causes a rush of nostalgia. 753♡ cannot believe Lilysa not only recovered but is actively picking a fight with her. As the audiences continue to shift, 753♡ cannot understand how Lilysa is having so much fun with a smaller audience until she realizes she is jealous because Lilysa is just like her when she started cosplaying. She also realizes she has hated cosplay for years now and almost breaks down. Mayuri is worried until 753♡ abruptly breaks character and starts posing as just herself, having fun as a cosplayer again.
11	"My Enchanted Armor"; Transliteration: "Mahō no Yoro" (Japanese: 魔法の鎧)	Kōzō Kaihō	Shinpei Nagai	September 13, 2024
Lilysa and 753♡ start to understand each other thanks to cosplay. YokoSuka ends with many wondering if Lilysa will be the next Heavenly Queen. Mayuri encounters her friend Eli for the first time since she retired. Meanwhile, 753♡ and Lilysa meet and become friends. 753♡ spots Okumura and realizes he is the Kai lookalike. Developing an instant crush, she asks him to consider cosplaying. 753♡ learns that she has lost her dressing room and must change with Lilysa and the others. At first, she fears being ridiculed like she is online, then panics when she cannot undress by herself since she was dressed by assistants. She is surprised when the others all offer to help because they respect her. 753♡ shows Lilysa her Liliel cosplay has already gone viral. On the train ride home, Mayuri seemingly overhears Lilysa and Okumura confessing their feelings for each other. However, she is disappointed to learn that she misinterpreted their conversation. At school, Mayuri explains the situation to the principal, who insists all club activities must be decided on by the student council. Lilysa finds herself the center of attention in class.
12	"Five Rising Stars"; Transliteration: "Gonin no Shinsei" (Japanese: 5人の新星)	Makoto Sokuza	Shinpei Nagai	September 20, 2024
Lilysa discovers she is the only student in class who is failing every subject. Meanwhile, Mayuri explains to Okumura that while the principal and student council president applauded his and Lilysa's desire to go public about their activities, they want to keep it a secret to avoid Lilysa being a potential target of bullying. The president later informs them that while they can keep their room, they cannot possess any risqué material at school. Mikari soon learns Mayuri is Mayura. As Mayuri starts teaching Lilysa about creating costumes, the latter is amazed to hear how difficult it was before cosplay became widely popular. During a voice chat, Ogino reveals to Okumura that Liliel was photographed by Mr. Camera, the influential photographer who coined the Four Heavenly Queens title, and he has included Liliel in his top five rising stars of cosplay. When Okumura express annoyance she is only ranked fifth, Ogino points out the one in fourth place, Nonoa, is another rookie who has gone viral via her ice queen demeanor. Lilysa is thrilled when she finds out she been included on the list. Elsewhere, an unknown person views Liliel's photos online.
13	"Can We Be Friends?"; Transliteration: "Tomodachi Dekiru ka na" (Japanese: 達できるかな)	Shūji Miyazaki	Kōichi Takada (Note: The episode's storyboard was incorrectly attributed to series writer Takao Yoshioka in the TV broadcast credits.)	September 27, 2024
While Lilysa and Okumura are shopping at a material store, the unknown person happens to be there and easily deduces Lilysa is Liliel, so she invites Lilysa to a Cinderella Stars event before running away. Suspecting she is Nonoa, Lilysa accepts the invite but only has one week to make a themed costume. Meanwhile, Nonoa is shown to suffer from severe social anxiety, which earned her fame as the Ice Queen but prevented her from making friends. Now, she desperately hopes to become friends with Liliel. On the day of the event, Nonoa is intimidated to see Lilysa already has many friends. Eavesdropping, she is shocked to discover Lilysa took the invite as a challenge. She later attempts to explain the misunderstanding but her glare scares Lilysa away. As Cinderella Stars is a game app, Lilysa reveals her costume is the crossover Singing Angel Liliel. Nonoa attempts to ask Lilysa to pose together but Lilysa asks her first. As such, Nonoa runs away after having a panic attack. Flashbacks show her anxiety started when her going off on tangents about manga was pointed out to her. Nonoa is then surprised when a concerned Okumura comes looking for her.
14	"Together with You"; Transliteration: "Anata to Issho ni" (Japanese: あなたと一緒に)	Daisuke Kurose	Kōichi Takata (Note: The episode's storyboard was incorrectly attributed to Daisuke Kurose in the TV broadcast credits.)	October 4, 2024
Nonoa is surprised Okumura thinks she hates Liliel when really she wants to be friends. When Okumura patiently waits for her to speak, Nonoa starts to realize not all people are judging her. She eventually thanks him for helping her at the material store before she runs away to find Liliel. Meanwhile, Lilysa struggles to perform as she worries about Nonoa hating her, so 753♡ urges her to go talk to Nonoa directly. Despite some delays with their fans, Lilysa finds Nonoa and bravely asks that they pose together. Nonoa ultimately manages to do so and they even start communicating through their love of cosplay. Having never heard Nonoa speak before, the fans go wild. Afterwards, Nonoa still cannot speak, causing Lilysa to feel like a nuisance and has made Nonoa dislike her even more. Terrified at losing her chance, Nonoa overcomes her doubts and finally speaks, asking Lilysa to be her friend. Elsewhere, Mikari worries Okumura is pulling further away from her and makes a surprise announcement that she regularly cosplays, sending her manager into a panic over the potential harm to her professional image.
15	"I'll Keep Evolving"; Transliteration: "Asu no Watashi e" (Japanese: 明日の私へ)	Yuki Morita	Kōichi Takada	October 11, 2024
Nonoa panics when 753♡ recognizes her out of costume. Unaware Nonoa and Lilysa are now friends, 753♡ demands Nonoa leave Liliel alone. Lilysa appears and the misunderstanding is cleared up. Nonoa almost restarts her habit of talking without listening but manages to ask Lilysa's opinion first so they have a real conversation. Nearby, another novice cosplayer, Aria Kisaki, is impressed by them. Nonoa meets Lilysa and Okumura after school for a photoshoot in a real studio owned by Mayuri's friend Chika-chan. Nonoa's depression starts to creep back when it becomes obvious she and Lilysa have very different motivations for cosplay before she recovers. Their session is soon interrupted by Aria, who asks to be Lilysa's friend too and to pose together. Not used to dealing with such an outgoing personality, Nonoa and Lilysa struggle to understand her, especially Nonoa who resents how easily she asked to be friends and her larger interest in becoming famous than liking cosplay itself. Aria reacts quite strongly to this, insisting that despite being beautiful enough to model or act, she has reasons for wanting to be famous. Unsure what else to do, Nonoa and Lilysa let Aria join them.
16	"Your Way, My Way"; Transliteration: "Watashi no Yarikata" (Japanese: 私のやり方)	Kōzō Kaihō	Shinpei Nagai	October 18, 2024
Nonoa is furious when Aria simply changes into a sports bra and insists she is cosplaying as Pearl-chan from Princess Chanel. Lilysa is likewise upset Aria simply picked a popular character but never bothered to learn about her. Thus, she insists Aria start watching as much anime to find a character she loves. Aria's education starts in their club room where it soon becomes apparent anime bores her, making it doubtful she could ever love a character enough to cosplay as them. Through effort and dedication, Aria is engrossed in the Liliel anime, which she claims reminds her of a manga from her childhood. Aria watches more anime and begins to develop her otaku persona until eventually she decides to cosplay as Ariel, another angel from the Liliel anime. Nonoa later spots pictures of Aria online cosplaying as Melia from Valkyries Battlefield, a manga that was panned as an Ash's War Chronicles rip-off and was cancelled after only ten chapters. At first, Aria is reluctant to explain why she chose Melia. However, after Nonoa's urging, Aria admits it was her father who created Valkyries Battlefield.
17	"Comrades in (Cosplay) Arms"; Transliteration: "Nakama ni Naritai" (Japanese: 仲間になりたい)	Tomoya Kunisaki	Iku Suzuki	October 25, 2024
Aria recalls that after Valkyries Battlefield was cancelled, her father, Yo, never managed to write another manga and became depressed. Aria's mother was forced to divorce Yo and the last time Aria spoke to him, she told him she hated him. Now, Aria wants to become popular cosplaying as Melia so her father will see that someone still loves his manga. Lilysa decides to get Aria ready to cosplay as Ariel in time for Summer Comiket, the largest event of the year. Lilysa also invites Mikari to cosplay as Miriella. Mikari agrees as she has spent months convincing her agency to let her cosplay, all to impress Okumura. Under Lilysa's guidance, Aria begins sewing her own costume, though she does wonder why the others trust Okumura enough to change clothes in front of him. Okumura eventually goes home so the girls go out for dinner together where Aria decides to try her hardest at cosplay for her new friends. Two weeks later, Aria successfully finishes her costume. That same night, she overhears her mother talking angrily on the phone to her former mother-in-law, and learns for the first time that her father seemingly died years ago.
18	"Destiny"; Transliteration: "Unmei" (Japanese: 運命)	Shizuka Izumi	Manabu Ono	November 1, 2024
In the club room, Aria is determined to cosplay in her father's memory after she is consoled by her friends. Okumura feels something is not right and eventually discovers Yo was an assistant of Takamatsu, the creator of Ash's War Chronicles. This leads him to compare the art of Valkyries Battlefield with another manga and confidently concludes Yo went on to create the spinoff, Liliel: Side Story. As this is still being serialized, Yo must be alive. Elsewhere, Yo is working on the latest chapter of Liliel: Side Story. He also keeps his only fan letter in his desk, which coincidentally was sent by Okumura. He explains to Mita, one of his assistants, how that one letter kept him from total despair. Aria later confirms the man her mother previously referred to was one of her father's relatives. Aria realizes if their cosplay is successful, her father might hear about it. When Mayuri warns everyone how huge Summer Comiket is, Mikari reveals she announced she will cosplay there on a TV show. Mita soon passes the news straight to Yo. After weeks of preparation, Summer Comiket finally arrives.
19	"Time for Summer Comiket!"; Transliteration: "Iza Natsu Komike Desu!" (Japanese: いざ夏コミですっ!)	Nana Fujiwara	Hideki Okamoto	November 8, 2024
At Summer Comiket, everyone encounters Ogino and Magino, who inform them Mr. Camera has revealed his second and third place rising stars, twins Lemon and Lime who are cosplaying as twin maids Shiro and Kuro from the manga Hell Maids. Meanwhile, Yo will not attend Summer Comiket, but Mita continues to monitor it. Back at Summer Comiket, Lilysa is surprised when Okumura asks her to do her best for him. Nearby, Lemon realizes she has a piece of Lime's costume and by chance asks Okumura to take it to the men's dressing room, revealing Lime is actually a boy. As the manga club wanders around the venue, they start to realize how difficult it will be to stand out. Mayuri and Ogino later warn Okumura about the challenges of Summer Comiket: it is so huge the audience is constantly moving, so holding their attention is almost impossible. The girls are not used to joint cosplay, resulting in bad photos no one wants to post online. Finally, while cosplayers need to take a break, they risk losing the crowd they had. Lilysa realizes unless they do something drastic, their plan will fail.
20	"The World We Create with Our Friends"; Transliteration: "Tomodachi to Tsukuru Sekai" (Japanese: 友達と作る世界)	Daisuke Kurose	Kōichi Takada	November 15, 2024
The others notice Lilysa is such a perfectionist she will not even break character to drink water. Anticipating this, Okumura gives Lilysa a very rare Liliel: Side Story mithril lunchbox set to use, complete with thermos. Once the girls resume the joint cosplay, Okumura helps them by serving as a focal point. Unfortunately, Lilysa collapses from a heatstroke. Elsewhere, Mita is disappointed the first day saw no mention of Liliel or any photos were posted online. When Lilysa later blames herself for what happened, Nonoa shouts at her for trying to do everything alone. Lilysa agrees and Mikari, Nonoa, and Aria spend the afternoon practicing poses from the manga. Nonoa soon discovers a picture of her carrying Liliel to the doctor has gone viral. The next morning, a large crowd forms to take the girls' picture as soon as they arrive. Thanks to the practice, things goes much better for them, so much so they rival Lemon and Lime's popularity. Aria is grateful to Lilysa as she begins to feel she is really inside the story her father wrote, while Lilysa is happy to be having fun with her friends.
21	"The Protagonist's Story"; Transliteration: "Shujinkō no Monogatari" (Japanese: 主人公の物語)	Makoto Noriza	Shinpei Nagai	November 22, 2024
In a flashback, Aria's mother had no problem if Aria wanted to see Yo and she asked her to pass on a message to him. Back in the present, pictures of the girls are posted online and Yo instantly recognizes Aria and rushes to Summer Comiket. Seeing Aria for the first time in years, Yo feels so ashamed he prioritized creating manga over her that he decides to leave. Aria spots Yo and sends Okumura to stall him while she changes costumes. While asking for Yo's autograph, Okumura is shocked to learn Yo despises himself for creating Valkyries Battlefield. When Okumura passionately defends it, Yo realizes Okumura is the one who wrote him the fan letter. Aria soon arrives in her Melia costume and an astounded Yo apologizes for abandoning her and they tearfully reconcile. Yo is happy his work has such loyal fans as he had been planning to end Liliel: Side Story. Having met them, he decides to keep it going as long as possible. Aria then passes on her mother's message: when Yo finally creates a new manga of his own, he better let her be the first to read it.
22	"This Wonderful World"; Transliteration: "Kono Sutekina Sekai" (Japanese: この素敵な世界)	Yuki Morita	Hideki Tonokatsu	November 29, 2024
On the third day of Summer Comiket, Okumura recalls Mayuri telling the manga club to look for a specific cosplayer. As they are exploring, they run into Magino, Eli, Mayuri, and 753♡ along the way. After a while, they finally find the cosplayer, who turns out to be Erika Awayuki, one of the Four Heavenly Queens of Cosplay. Before the manga club leaves, Aria reveals her parents have reconcile. On the fourth and final day of Summer Comiket, Okumura and Lilysa attend the event together while cosplaying as Ashford and Liliel, respectively. While taking a break, Lilysa is conflicted about her feelings for Okumura after she thanks him for inspiring her before they run into a Chinese Liliel cosplayer named Xiaoyu. Lilysa soon experiences jealousy when Xiaoyu poses with Okumura. After the misunderstanding from all sides is cleared up, everyone say their goodbyes. When they head home, Okumura is similarly conflicted about his feelings for Lilysa.
23	"Manga Club On the Beach"; Transliteration: "Manken on the beach" (Japanese: 漫研 on the beach)	Michita Shiraishi	Kōichi Takada	December 6, 2024
Mayuri takes the manga club to the beach as part of a summer training camp trip. Once they arrive there, Okumura attempts to follow Mayuri's advice to see the girls beyond their cosplay so he can take better photos. Later that night, the manga club goes on a haunted cemetery tour. While they are alone together, Aria realizes she has feelings for Okumura. As they wait for the others, Okumura admits that he used to like real girls when he was young, so much so that he even had a crush. However, he developed trust issues after his mother abandoned him. The next day, Okumura prepares for a photoshoot with the girls. During the shoot, he is able to capture a genuine photo of Mikari as herself. After a couple of hours, he seemingly figures out the meaning of Mayuri's advice. Meanwhile, noticing how Okumura reacts whenever he sees Lilysa, Mikari leaves the room. When Lilysa catches up with her, Mikari reveals she is in love with Okumura.
24	"2.5-Dimensional Ririsa"; Transliteration: "Nitengo-jigen no Ririsa" (Japanese: 2.5次元のリリサ)	Kōzō Kaihō	Hideki Okamoto	December 13, 2024
While Lilysa processes what she just heard, a regretful Mikari tries to leave. However, the former stops her. Mikari soon admits that despite all of Okumura's flaws, she still loves him. In turn, Lilysa admits she is conflicted about her feelings for Okumura. Realizing she considers Lilysa to be her friend, a consoled Mikari gives the latter her blessing to pursue Okumura as well. Unbeknownst to them, Okumura heard their conversation. He is then concerned about how he should handle the situation with Mikari before Mayuri advises him to open his eyes to those who care about him. Once the photoshoot resumes, Okumura tells Lilysa that he wants to capture her specific Liliel. As a result, he is able to take a genuine photo of Lilysa as herself. Sometime later, the manga club reunite in the club room.
Special	Transliteration: "Nigoriri no Numa o Motto Shirō no Kai" (Japanese: にごリリの沼をもっと知ろうの回)	N/A	N/A	December 20, 2024
A special episode where the main voice cast share their thoughts on the first season of the series.

== Home media release ==
=== Japanese ===
Pony Canyon (Japan – Region 2/A)
Vol.	Episodes	Cover character(s)	Release date	Ref.
Season 1
1	1–3	Lilysa Amano	September 25, 2024	
2	4–6	Mikari Tachibana	October 23, 2024	
3	7–9	Nonoa	November 20, 2024	
4	10–12	Aria Kisaki	December 25, 2024	
5	13–15	Lilysa Amano (Liliel)	February 26, 2025	
6	16–18	Mayuri Hanyu (Lustalotte)	March 26, 2025	
7	19–21	753♡ (Ikora)	April 23, 2025	
8	22–24	Aria Kisaki (Ariel), Nonoa (Nokiel), Lilysa Amano (Liliel), and Mikari Tachibana (Miriella)	May 28, 2025	

=== English ===
Sentai Filmworks (North America – Region 1/A)
Season	Discs	Episodes	Cover art	Release date	Ref.
1	3	1–24	Aria Kisaki (Ariel), Nonoa (Nokiel), Lilysa Amano (Liliel), and Mikari Tachibana (Miriella)	February 24, 2026	
