= Narumi =

- Pronunciation: Ná-rú-mí
- Gender: Female

Origin
- Origin: Japanese
- Meaning: It can have many different meanings depending on the kanji used.

Narumi (鳴海) is a Japanese word for "the roaring of the sea". Narumi (なるみ, ナルミ) is also a feminine Japanese given name which can also be used as a surname.

== Written forms ==
Narumi can be written using different kanji characters and can mean:

- 鳴海, "the roaring of the sea"

as a given name

- 成美, "achieve, beauty"
- 成実, "achieve, truth"

as a surname

- 成実, "achieve, truth"
- 成海, "achieve, sea"
- 鳴海, "the roaring of the sea"

The given name can also be written in hiragana or katakana.

== People with the name ==
=== Given name ===
- Narumi Akatsuki (暁 成実), Japanese idol from Kamen Joshi
- Narumi Ichino (市野 成美; born 1999), Japanese former idol from SKE48
- Narumi Kakinouchi (垣野内 成美; born 1962), Japanese manga artist, animator, director, and character designer
- Narumi Kataoka (片岡 成美; born 2003), Japanese former idol from SKE48
- Narumi Kuranō (倉野尾 成美; born 2000), Japanese idol from AKB48
- Narumi Kurosaki (黒崎 愛海; 1995–2016), Japanese woman murdered in France
- Narumi Kurosu (黒須 成美; born 1991), Japanese modern pentathlete
- Narumi Miura (三浦 成美; born 1997), Japanese women's footballer
- Narumi Okawa (大川 成美; born 1990), Japanese AV idol
- Narumi Takahashi (高橋 成美; born 1992), Japanese pair skater
- Narumi Takahira (高平 成美; born 1989), Japanese actress and voice actress
- Narumi Tanioka (谷岡成美; born 2002), Japanese judoka
- Narumi Tsunoda (津野田 なるみ; born 1962), Japanese voice actress
- Narumi Uno (宇野 愛海; born 1998), Japanese former idol from Shiritsu Ebisu Chugaku
- Narumi Yasuda (安田 成美; born 1966), Japanese actress

=== Surname ===
- August S. Narumi (1919–1994), Bronze Wolf recipient
- Juria Narumi (鳴海 寿莉亜; born 1998), Japanese former idol from Yumemiru Adolescence
- Kyoko Narumi (鳴海 杏子; born 1986), Japanese voice actress and singer.
- Riko Narumi (成海 璃子; born 1992), Japanese actress and model
- Runa Narumi (成海 瑠奈; born 1995), Japanese former voice actress and singer

== Fictional characters ==
=== Given name ===
- Narumi (鳴海), a character from the manga and anime series Alice Academy
- Narumi Yatadera (矢田寺 成美), a character in Hidden Star in Four Seasons from the video game franchise Touhou Project

=== Surname ===
- Ayumu Narumi (鳴海), the main character in the manga and anime series Spiral: The Bonds of Reasoning
- Kiyotaka Narumi (鳴海), the brother of Ayumu Narumi from the manga and anime series Spiral: The Bonds of Reasoning
- Kiyotaka Narumi (成実), a character in the anime series Lucky Star
- Shogo Narumi (鳴海), a character in the manga series Beauty Pop
- Shizuto Narumi (成海), a minor character in the manga and anime series Yakitate!! Japan
- Yui Narumi (成実), a character in the anime series Lucky Star
- Shōhei Narumi (鳴海), a character in the video games Devil Summoner: Raidou Kuzunoha vs. the Soulless Army and Devil Summoner 2: Raidou Kuzunoha vs. King Abaddon
- Akiko Narumi (鳴海), the lead female character of Kamen Rider W
  - Soukichi Narumi (鳴海), Akiko's father and former boss of one of the lead characters in Kamen Rider W
- Daisuke Narumi, a character in the manga Kuroko's Basketball
- Asaka Narumi, a character in the anime series Cardfight!! Vanguard
- Gen Narumi, a character in the anime series Kaiju No. 8

== See also ==
- Narumi-juku (鳴海宿), the fortieth of the fifty-three stations of the Tōkaidō
- Narumi Station (鳴海駅), a train station located in Nagoya
