= Aşağı =

Aşağı means "lower" in Turkic languages. It may refer to:

== Other ==
- Asagi (Japanese: 浅黄), a variety of koi
- Asagi (浅葱), Japanese musician, lead vocalist of the band D
- Asagi (浅葱), character in Legend of Basara
- Asagi Ayase (綾瀬 あさぎ), character in Azumanga Daioh
- Asagi (あさぎ), character in Witchblade anime
- Asagi Igawa (井河 アサギ), playable character in video games Action Taimanin

== See also ==
- Yukarı (disambiguation), "upper"
