= List of 2.5 Dimensional Seduction chapters =

2.5 Dimensional Seduction is a Japanese manga series written and illustrated by Yu Hashimoto. It was serialized on Shueisha's Shōnen Jump+ manga website from June 15, 2019, to December 20, 2025. Shueisha collected its chapters in twenty-five tankōbon volumes, released from October 4, 2019, to February 4, 2026.

In June 2021, Seven Seas Entertainment announced that they licensed the series for English publication under their Ghost Ship imprint.

== Volumes ==
No.	Original release date	Original ISBN	English release date	English ISBN
1	October 4, 2019	978-4-08-882129-0	February 8, 2022	978-1-64827-881-5
1. "The New Member" (異次元の新入生, Ijigen no Shinnyūsei); 2. "The First Photo Shoot" (はじめての撮影会, Hajimete no Satsuei-kai); 3. "Ultra Erotic Poses" (激エロポーズ, Geki Ero Pōzu); 4. "The School Uniform Shoot!" (制服で撮影会！, Seifuku de Satsuei-kai!); 5. "The Perfect Collab Partner" ("併せ"の予感, "Awase" no Yokan); 6. "Mikari's True Feelings" (美花莉のきもち, Mikari no Kimochi); 7. "Who'll Be Liliel?!" (どっちがリリエル!?, Dotchi ga Ririeru!?)
2	January 4, 2020	978-4-08-882182-5	April 19, 2022	978-1-63858-275-5
8. "Mikari's First Cosplay" (初めてのコスプレ, Hajimete no Kosupure); 9. "Lili × Miriel" (リリ×ミリ, Riri × Miri); 10. "Editing All-Nighter" (夜の部室で編集!?, Yoru no Bushitsu de Henshū!?); 11. "Is It a Date?" (デートみたいな朝, Dēto Mitaina Asa); 12. "First Time Jitters" (いざ初イベント!, Iza Hatsu Ibento!); 13. "Changing Room Incident" (更衣室で一大事!?, Kōishitsu de Ichidaiji!?); 14. "The Mirror of the Soul" (目線の行方, Mesen no Yukue); 15. "First Convention? Check!!" (初イベント終ろ!!, Hatsu Ibento Owaro!!); 16. "Mikari on the Offensive!" (美花莉の挑戦!, Mikari no Chōsen!); Bonus: "One Hundred Cosplay Tales" (コスプレイヤー百物語, Kosupureiyā Hyakumonogatari)
3	February 4, 2020	978-4-08-882207-5	July 19, 2022	978-1-63858-391-2
17. "2.5 Dimensional Café?!" (２.5次元カフェ!?, Nitengo-jigen Kafe!?); 18. "Senpai's Secret Training" (先輩の秘密特訓!?, Senpai no Himitsu Tokkun!?); 19. "Liliel's in Trouble!" (リリエル、ピンチです!?, Ririeru, Pinchi Desu!?); 20. "In Search of an Advisor" (顧問の先生が必要です, Komon no Sensei ga Hitsuyō Desu); 21. "Convincing Mayuri-sensei" (まゆり先生を説得です！, Mayuri-sensei o Settoku Desu!); 22. "Club Activity Report!" (活動報告です！, Katsudō Hōkoku Desu!); 23. "Rebellion" (二人の答えです, Futari no Kotae Desu); 24. "So, You Love Cosplay?" (コスプレを愛してる？, Kosupure o Aishiteru?); Bonus: "Insanely Hot Cosrom!" (激エロROMが作りたいっ!, Geki Ero Romu ga Tsukurita Itsu!)
4	May 13, 2020	978-4-08-882337-9	December 20, 2022	978-1-63858-737-8
25. "A Real Pro" (プロの実力, Puro no Jitsuryoku); 26. "Lilysa's Problem" (リリサの問題, Ririsa no Mondai); 27. "You're Not Liliel" (キミはリリエルじゃない, Kimi wa Ririeru Janai); 28. "Mayura vs. Nagomi!!" (まゆら様VS753!!, Mayura-sama VS Nagomi!!); 29. "Rivals" (ライバル, Raibaru); 30. "Liliel's Resurrection" (リリエル復活ですっ！, Ririeru Fukkatsu Desu!); 31. "The Same Smile" (同じ笑顔で, Onaji Egao de); 32. "Magic Armor" (魔法の鎧, Mahō no Yoroi); Bonus: "Friyay! With Nagomi" (753、花の金曜日, 753, Hana no Kin'yōbi)
5	July 3, 2020	978-4-08-882355-3	March 21, 2023	978-1-63858-927-3
33. "At the Crossroads" (三叉路, Sansaro); 34. "This Side of the Screen" (画面のこちらがわ, Gamen no Kochira ga wa); 35. "The Duty of an Adult" (大人の覚悟, Otona no Kakugo); 36. "Cosplay Now and Then" (コスプレ今昔, Kosupure Konjaku); 37. "Five Rising Stars" (5人の新星, Gonin no Shinsei); 38. "Nonoa" (Note: This chapter title is stylized in all caps in the Japanese version.); 39. "Be My Friend?" (友達できるかな, Tomodachi Dekiru ka na); 40. "Better Not" (乃愛ちゃんは, Osamu Ai-chan wa); Bonus: "Photoshoot with Idol Liliel" (アイドルリリエル 撮影会ですっ!!, Aidoru Ririeru Satsuei-kai Desu!!)
6	September 4, 2020	978-4-08-882464-2	May 16, 2023	978-1-63858-992-1
41. "Follow Your Heart" (自分の気持ち, Jibun no Kimochi); 42. "With You" (あなたと一緒に, Anata to Issho ni); 43. "Friends" (ともだち, Tomodachi); 44. "Do Better Tomorrow" (明日の私へ, Ashita no Watashi e); 45. "The Knight" (騎士, Kishi); 46. "My Way" (私のやり方, Watashi no Yarikata); 47. "Down the Rabbit Hole" (アリアちゃんを 沼に落とします!, Aria-chan Ōnuma ni Otoshimasu!); 48. "What Are Friends For?" (仲間になりたい, Nakama ni Naritai); Bonus: "Aria-chan's Costume Research?!" (アリアちゃんの 研究ですっ!?, Aria-chan no Kenkyū Desu!?)
7	December 4, 2020	978-4-08-882565-6	August 22, 2023	978-1-68579-600-6
49. "Cosplay Friends" (友達と, Tomodachi to); 50. "Fate" (運命, Unmei); 51. "Aria" (アリア); 52. "Summer Comiket, Here We Come!" (いざ夏コミですっ!, Iza Natsu Komike Desu!); 53. "Rooftop Battle" (屋上の戦い, Okujō no Tatakai); 54. "The Curse of Summer Comiket" (夏コミの魔物, Natsu Komike no Mamono); 55. "Under the Blazing Sun" (斜陽の下で, Shayō no Shita de); 56. "The World Created with Friends" (友達と作る世界, Tomodachi to Tsukuru Sekai); Bonus: "Mikari's 2.5 Dimensional Seduction" (2.5次元の誘惑(みかり), Nitengo-jigen no Mikari)
8	February 4, 2021	978-4-08-882635-6	November 7, 2023	978-1-68579-576-4
57. "The Sinner" (罪人, Tsumibito); 58. "Okumura's Story" (主人公の物語, Shujinkō no Monogatari); 59. "Back in 2.5D" (2.5次元の再会, Nitengo-jigen no Saikai); 60. "Liliel: Side Story" (リリエル外伝, Ririeru Gaiden); 61. "Where Aria Stands" (アリアの気持ち, Aria no Kimochi); 62. "A Comiket Date?!" (コミケデートです!?, Komike Dēto Desu!?); 63. "This Beautiful World" (この素敵な世界, Kono Sutekina Sekai); 64. "A Summer Training Camp?!" (夏合宿です!?, Natsu Gasshuku Desu!?); Bonus: "A Day in the Life of Nonoa" (コスプレイヤーNONOAの ルーティーン, Kosupureiyā NONOA no Rūtīn)
9	April 2, 2021	978-4-08-882664-6	February 20, 2024	979-8-88843-408-6
65. "Manga Club at the Beach" (漫研 on the beach, Manken on the beach); 66. "The Real Test of Courage" (いま本当の肝が試される, Ima Hontō no Kimo ga Tamesa Reru); 67. "Behind the Cosplay" (ミリエラの奥, Miriera no Oku); 68. "Mikari Loses Hope" (美花莉の絶望, Mikari no Zetsubō); 69. "Where Angels Tread" (天使の次元, Tenshi no Jigen); 70. "2.5 Dimensional Lilysa" (2.5次元のリリサ, Nitengo-jigen no Ririsa); 71. "Virgin Mary" (聖母, Seibo); 72. "Maa-kun and Mari-nee" (まーくんとまり姉, Ma-kun to Mari Ane); Bonus: "A Night at the Training Camp" (合宿の夜, Gasshuku no Yoru); Bonus: "Mayura and Eli's First Date" (まゆらとエリの初デート, Mayura to Eri no Hatsu Dēto)
10	July 2, 2021	978-4-08-882754-4	May 14, 2024	979-8-88843-631-8
73. "Cosplay Café?!" (コスプレカフェですっ!?, Kosupure Kafe Desu!?); 74. "Costume Meeting!!" (衣装会議ですっ!!, Ishō Kaigi Desu!); 75. "Mari-nee's Secret" (まり姉の秘密, Mari Ane no Himitsu); 76. "Down with Uniforms!" (制服を脱ぎ捨てて, Seifuku o Nugisutete); 77. "My Very Own Costume" (私のコスプレ, Watashi no Kosupure); 78. "Two of a Kind" (面影, Omokage); 79. "The Seven Cats" (7匹の猫, Nanahiki no Neko); 80. "All of Me" (全部の私, Zenbu no Watashi); Bonus: "Backstage" (ブタイウラ, Butaiura)
11	October 4, 2021	978-4-08-882838-1	August 13, 2024	979-8-89160-206-9
81. "A Fresh Autumn Breeze" (爽(そう)鐘(らい), Sōrai); 82. "Studying with Mari-nee!" (まり姉とお勉強ですっ!, Mari Ane to o Benkyō Desu!); 83. "Culture Festival After-Party!" (文化祭打ち上げですっ!, Bunkamatsuri Uchiage Desu!); 84. "The Melancholy of Taki Midori" (瀧ミドリの憂鬱, Taki Midori no Yūutsu); 85. "Midterms!" (定期テストですっ!, Teiki Tesuto Desu!); 86. "Getting Ready for Winter Comiket!!" (冬コミの準備ですっ!!, Fuyu Komi no Junbi Desu!!); 87. "Choosing Characters!!" (キャラセレですっ!!, Kyarasere Desu!!); 88. "The Gacha Tournament!" (ガチャ大会ですっ!, Gacha Taikai Desu!); Bonus: "Culture Festival Date?!" (文化祭デートですっ!?, Bunkamatsuri Dēto Desu!?); Bonus: "One More Round!" (カラオケおかわり!, Karaoke o Kawari!)
12	December 3, 2021	978-4-08-882899-2	November 19, 2024	979-8-89160-207-6
89. "Yoki" (夜(ヨ)姫(キ)); 90. "Wintertime" (冬が来る, Fuyugakuru); 91. "Otaku Christmas" (オタクの聖夜, Otaku no Seiya); 92. "Winter Comiket, Here We Come!!" (いざ冬コミですっ!!, Iza Fuyu Komike Desu!!); 93. "2.5 Dimensional Costume" (2.5次元の衣装, Nitengo-jigen no Ishō); 94. "Group A" (グループA, Gurūpu A); 95. "Awakening" (覚醒, Kakusei); 96. "When Pros Have Fun" (プロのあそび, Puro no Asobi); Bonus: "Otaku Christmas, Continued" (オタクの聖夜・アフター, Otaku no Seiya Afutā)
13	March 4, 2022	978-4-08-883070-4	February 4, 2025	979-8-89160-391-2
97. "December 28th" (12月28日, Jūnigatsu Nijūhachi-nichi); 98. "Under Fire" (炎, Honō); 99. "C99"; 100. "Sparkle" (キラキラ, Kirakira); 101. "After the Battle" (戦いおわって, Tatakai Owatte); 102. "New Year's Shrine Visit" (初詣, Hatsumōde); 103. "Collaboration Café!" (コラボカフェです!, Korabo Kafe Desu!); 104. "Marina's Kitchen" (まりなクッキング, Marina Kukkingu); Bonus: "Otaku New Year's Eve" (オタクたちの大晦日, Otaku-tachi no Ōmisoka); Secret Chef's Kiss Chapter: "Sneaky Valentine" (裏バレンタイン, Ura Barentain)
14	July 4, 2022	978-4-08-883166-4	May 6, 2025	979-8-89160-954-9
105. "Otaku Valentine's Day" (オタクのバレンタイン, Otaku no Barentain); 106. "True Feelings" (本命, Honmei) (Note: This chapter is titled "True Love" in the English volume release.); 107. "The Wall" (壁, Kabe); 108. "On Thin Ice in 0.5D (Part 1)" (0.5次元の薄氷(前編), Reitengo-jigen no Hakuhyō (Zenpen)); 109. "On Thin Ice in 0.5D (Part 2)" (0.5次元の薄氷(後編), Reitengo-jigen no Hakuhyō (Kōhen)); 110. "First Signs of Spring" (啓蟄, Keichitsu); 111. "In Another Dimension" (「異次元の2年生」, "Ijigen no Ninensei"); 112. "Spring" (春, Haru); Bonus: "Marina's Penance" (まりなの懺悔, Marina no Zange); Bonus: "White Day" (ホワイトデー, Howaitodē)
15	October 4, 2022	978-4-08-883286-9	August 26, 2025	979-8-89373-586-4
113. "Clubs Open House!" (部活見学ですっ!, Bukatsu Kengaku Desu!) (Note: This chapter is titled "Open House Day!" in the English volume release.); 114. "The Wings of Freedom" (自由の翼, Jiyū no Tsubasa); 115. "Productive Otaku?" (生産的なオタクです?, Seisan-tekina Otaku Desu?); 116. "The Manga Club's True Colors" (漫研の正体, Manken no Shōtai); 117. "Genes and Choices" (遺伝, Iden); 118. "Sewing Hack" (裏技, Urawaza) (Note: This chapter is titled "A Sewing Hack" in the English volume release.); 119. "Baikel" (バキエル, Bakieru); 120. "Heaven" (天界, Tenkai); Bonus: "All-You-Can-Stuff Tsubaki" (「ツバキ詰め放題」, "Tsubaki Tsume-hōdai")
16	January 4, 2023	978-4-08-883392-7	November 18, 2025	979-8-89373-587-1
121. "The Underworld" (魔界, Makai) (Note: This chapter is titled "Hell" in the English volume release.); 122. "Hellfire" (業火, Gōka) (Note: This chapter is titled "Inferno" in the English volume release.); 123. "The Answer Here and Now" (今ここにある解, Ima Koko ni Aru Kai) (Note: This chapter is titled "When It's Right in Front of You" in the English volume release.); 124. "Hana Tsubaki" (ハナツバキ, Hanatsubaki); 125. "Simply Having Fun" (楽しいだけ, Tanoshī Dake) (Note: This chapter is titled "Just for Fun" in the English volume release.); 126. "Outdoor Otaku Activities!" (屋外オタ活ですっ!!, Okugai Ota Katsu Desu!!) (Note: This chapter is titled "Otaku Fun Outside of School" in the English volume release.); 127. "The Last of the Four Heavenly Queens" (最後の四天王, Saigo no Shiten'nō) (Note: This chapter is titled "The Last Heavenly Queen" in the English volume release.); 128. "An Anime Adaptation?!" (アニメ化ですっ!?, Anime-ka Desu!?) (Note: This chapter is titled "Anime Adaptation?!" in the English volume release.); Bonus: "Swimsuit Shopping!" (「水着を選びますっ!」, "Mizugi o Erabi ma Sūtsu!")
17	May 2, 2023	978-4-08-883520-4	February 17, 2026	979-8-89373-588-8
129. "The Queen" (女王様, Joō-sama); 130. "The Next Heavenly Queen" (次の四天王, Tsugi no Shiten'nō); 131. "What Do You Two Want to Do?" (君たちは何をしたいのか, Kimitachi wa Nani o Shitai no ka); 132. "The Space Between" (間, Ma) (Note: This chapter is titled "Space" in the English volume release.); 133. "Bed of Roses" (お花畑, Ohanabatake) (Note: This chapter is titled "Field of Flowers" in the English volume release.); 134. "A Spring Training Camp?!" (春合宿ですっ!?, Haru Gasshuku Desu!?) (Note: This chapter is titled "Spring Training Camp?!" in the English volume release.); 135. "Overlapping Shadows" (重なる影, Kasanaru Kage) (Note: This chapter is titled "Overlapping Silhouettes" in the English volume release.); Bonus: "Considerate ☆ Mikarin" (「せわやき☆みかりん」, "Sewayaki☆Mikarin"); Bonus: "Extended Stay!" (「おとまりおかわり!」, "Otomari Kawari!"); Bonus: Selected Illustrations (イラスト傑作選, Irasuto Kessaku-sen)
18	September 4, 2023	978-4-08-883683-6	May 12, 2026	979-8-89373-589-5
136. "The Angel Next Door" (となりの天使, Tonari no Tenshi) (Note: This chapter is titled "Angel Next Door" in the English volume release.); 137. "A World Without Color" (色なき世界, Iro Naki Sekai) (Note: This chapter is titled "A Colorless World" in the English volume release.); 138. "To Be Somebody" (何者, Nanimono) (Note: This chapter is titled "Becoming Somebody" in the English volume release.); 139. "Awayuki" (淡雪); 140. "My Wish" (私の願い, Watashi no Negai); 141. "A World Colored by Love" (愛色の世界, Aiiro no Sekai) (Note: This chapter is titled "The World Colored by Love" in the English volume release.); 142. "A Somebody's Dream" (何者の夢, Nanimono no Yume) (Note: This chapter is titled "Someone's Dream" in the English volume release.); 143. "Let's Start Editing" (編集スタートですっ!, Henshū Sutāto Desu!) (Note: This chapter is titled "Let the Editing Begin!" in the English volume release.); Bonus: "Nonoari Arcade Date" (「ノノアリゲーセンデート」, "Nonoari Gēsen Dēto"); Bonus: "Drawing!" (「デッサン!」, "Dessan!")
19	January 4, 2024	978-4-08-883866-3	August 18, 2026	979-8-89561-343-6
144. "It's Field Day!" (体育祭ですっ!, Taiikumatsuri Desu!); 145. "Our Cosrom Is Complete!" (ROM完成ですっ!, Romu Kansei Desu!); 146. "An Otaku Wrap Party?" (オタク打ち上げですっ!?, Otaku Uchiage Desu!?); 147. "The Next Heavenly Queen" (次の四天王, Tsugi no Shitennō); 148. "Q&A" (キューアンドエー, Kyūandoē); 149. "The Cosplay That Started It All" (はじまりのコスプレ, Hajimari no Kosupure); 150. "Lilysa-chan's Costumes" (リリサちゃんの衣装, Ririsa-chan no Ishō); 151. "My Wings" (私のつばさ, Watashi no Tsubasa); Bonus: "High School Mayueri's First Time" (「JKまゆエリ初体験」, "JK Mayueri Hatsutaiken")
20	July 4, 2024	978-4-08-884071-0	November 17, 2026	979-8-89561-344-3
152. "Summer Is Coming" (夏が来る, Natsugakuru); 153. "Our Second Summer" (二度目の夏, Futatabime no Natsu); 154. "Teacher" (先生, Sensei); 155. "The Day of Resurrection" (復活の日, Fukkatsu no Hi); 156. "Dreams of Days Gone By" (在りし日の次(ゆ)元(め), Arishi Hi no Yume); 157. "Standing Side by Side" (並び立つ, Narabitatsu); 158. "Borrowed Scenery" (借景, Shakkei); 159. "Legendary" (伝説級, Densetsu-kyū); Bonus: "Can't Decide on Underwear!" (「下着が決まらない」, "Shitagi ga Kimaranai")
21	October 4, 2024	978-4-08-884222-6	February 23, 2027	979-8-89765-581-6
160. "Eli" (エリ, Eri); 161. "The Whereabouts of Love" (愛のゆくえ, Ai no Yukue); 162. "A Teacher's Resolve" (先生の決断, Sensei no Ketsudan); 163. "The Next Great Cosplayer" (次の最強, Tsugi no Saikyō); 164. "Luluna" (ルルナ, Ruruna); 165. "Anime" (アニメ); 166. "Our Second Summer Camp" (二度目の夏合宿ですっ！, Futatabime no Natsu Gasshuku Desu!); 167. "Escape the Haunted House!" (ホラー脱出ゲームですっ！, Horā Dasshutsu Gēmu Desu!); Bonus: "Mikari Tachibana Is a Total Pushover." (橘美花莉はナメられる。, Tachibana Mikari wa Namerareru)
22	January 4, 2025	978-4-08-884381-0	May 25, 2027	979-8-89765-582-3
168. "An Adult Conversation?!" (大人の話ですっ!?, Otona no Hanashi Desu!?); 169. "The Gap Between Dimensions" (次元の狭間で, Jigen no Hazama de); 170. "3 Dimensional Lilysa" (3次元の誘惑(リリサ), Sanjigen no Ririsa); 171. "Too Cute of a Woman" (可愛すぎる女, Kawaii Sugiru On'na); 172. "Various Dreams" (それぞれの夢, Sorezore no Yume); 173. "The Melancholy of Masamune Okumura" (奥村正宗の憂鬱, Okumura Masamune no Yūutsu); 174. "The Final Culture Festival" (最後の文化祭, Saigo no Bunka Matsuri); 175. "Main Stage" (メインステージ, Mein Sutēji); Bonus: "I'm Not Seducing You, Dummy!" (誘惑なんてしないんだからね!, Yūwaku Nante Shinain Dakara ne!)
23	May 2, 2025	978-4-08-884547-0	—	—
176. "Shining Stars" (輝ける星, Kagayakeru Hoshi); 177. "It's Culture Festival Day!" (文化祭当日!, Bunka Matsuri Tōjitsu!); 178. "2.5 Dimensional Okumura" (2.5次元の奥村, Nitengo-jigen no Okumura); 179. "Half the World" (いつか世界の半分を, Itsuka Sekai no Hanbun o); 180. "One Final Job" (最後の仕事, Saigo no Shigoto); 181. "Backfire" (裏目, Urame); 182. "Kurumi" (くるみ); 183. "Deal with it Later" (あとで処理, Ato de Shori); Bonus: "Taki Kaichō no Ōen Desu!" (「瀧会長の応援ですっ!」)
24	October 3, 2025	978-4-08-884734-4	—	—
184. "The Final Winter Comiket" (「最後のコミケ」, "Saigo no Komike"); 185. "Clear Skies" (快晴, Kaisei); 186. "The Promised Land" (約束の地, Yakusoku no Ji); 187. "Wings Too Small to Fly" (羽ばたくには小さい, Habataku ni wa Chiisai); 188. "A Triumphant Return" (凱旋, Gaisen); 189. "Last Stop" (終点, Shūten); 190. "Angeli Ex Machina" (Note: This chapter title is stylized in all lowercase in the Japanese version.); 191. "United Under One Love" (ひとつ愛の下, Hitotsu Ai no Shita); Bonus: "Pajamapātī!" (「パジャマパーティー!」); Bonus: "Futsū ni Jorei" (「普通に除霊」); Bonus: "Gyaru to Kosume to Kosupureiyā" (「ギャルとコスメとコスプレイヤー」)
25	February 4, 2026	978-4-08-885020-7	—	—
192. "That Liliel" (あのリリエル, Ano Ririeru); 193. "Karaoke Once More" (カラオケ再び, Karaoke Futatabi); 194. "As the Angels Will It" (天使のまにまに, Tenshi no Manimani); 195. "Final Showdown" (最終決戦, Saishū Kessen); 196. "Confession" (告白, Kokuhaku); 197. "The Heroine's Story" (ヒロインの物語, Hiroin no Monogatari); 198. "The Heroine's Story" (主人公たちの物語, Shujinkō-tachi no Monogatari); 199. "The End of 2D" (2次元の終わり, Nijigen no Owari); 200. "The Beginning of 3D" (3次元の始まり, Sanjigen no Hajimari); 201. "2.5 Dimensional Seduction: Side Story" (にごリリ外伝, Nigoriri Gaiden)
