= Taimanin =

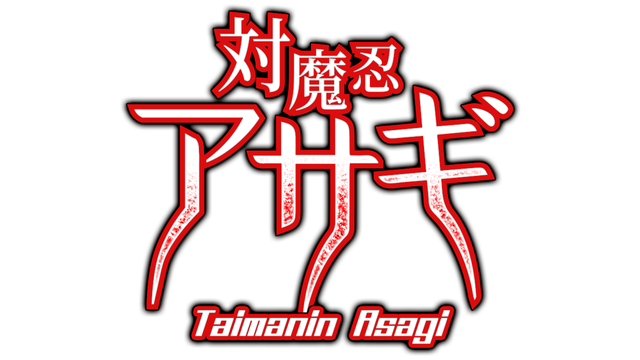
- Taimanin Asagi logo
- Genres: Eroge; Visual novel; Science fiction; Ninja Fantasy
- Developer: Lilith
- Publishers: Lilith; Infini-Brain; EXNOA; Shiravune
- Creator: Sasayama Ittousai
- Producer: EDEN
- Artists: Kagami Hirotaka; Aoi Nagisa
- Platforms: Microsoft Windows; iOS; Android
- First release: Taimanin Asagi; October 21, 2005
- Latest release: Taimanin Squad; March 4, 2026

Taimanin is a media franchise by LILITH. Originally starting as an eroge visual novel series, over time Taimanin has grown to include hentai OVA and live action JAV adaptations of the source material.

While the main series is notorious for its extreme fetish content contextualized by extensively dark worldbuilding, since the release of Action Taimanin the series has also started seeing success as an all-ages intellectual property.

== Story ==
In a fantasy version of modern Tokyo, the world of Taimanin is split between the Human World and the Demon World. The Taimanin are a group of highly skilled shinobi and kunoichi who are tasked by government officials with fighting off demons and increasingly corrupt organizations from the shadows to maintain peace, usually while struggling to maintain their sanity in the face of their lustful torments.

The series primarily follows Asagi Igawa as the lead heroine in her fights to defeat her archenemy Oboro after she kidnaps Asagi's fiancé. The series has branched out to other lead heroines in Asagi's place. The series has been called one of the most memorable eroge of the 2000s.

The series also shares worlds with works such as Tentacle & Witches and Steel Witch Annerose.

== Games ==
=== Visual novels ===
Game	Details
Taimanin Asagi Original release dates: JP: October 21, 2005; WW: October 27, 2023	Release years by system: 2005 – Microsoft Windows; 2014 – Android
Taimanin Asagi Original release dates: JP: October 21, 2005; WW: October 27, 2023	Notes: Re-released as Taimanin Asagi - Complete Edition in 2006 with additional anime sequences.; In 2019, Taimanin Asagi was going to be released worldwide in episodic format by Infini-Brain. However, it was pulled from the Steam storefront on September 3rd by Valve.; The game's first episode was restored in January 2020 but no further episodes were released.; The Complete Edition of the game was localized to English, Korean, and Chinese by Shiravune and released on October 27th, 2023.
Taimanin Asagi 2 Original release dates: JP: October 21, 2006; WW: 2026	Release years by system: 2006 – Microsoft Windows; 2014 – Android
Taimanin Asagi 2 Original release dates: JP: October 21, 2006; WW: 2026	Notes: Shiravune will localize and release the game on Steam in 2026.
Taimanin Murasaki: Kunoichi Kugutsu Dorei ni Otsu Original release dates: JP: October 24, 2008	Release years by system: 2008 – Microsoft Windows
Taimanin Yukikaze Original release dates: JP: September 16, 2011; WW: April 30, 2024	Release years by system: 2011 – Microsoft Windows
Taimanin Yukikaze Original release dates: JP: September 16, 2011; WW: April 30, 2024	Notes: Re-released in 2015 as Taimanin Yukikaze Animation.; In 2020, Taimanin Yukikaze was going to be released worldwide in episodic format by Infini-Brain.; Shortly after release, Lilith was accused from using an existing fan translation without proper crediting..; Taimanin Yukikaze Animation was localized to English, Korean, and Chinese by Shiravune and released on April 30, 2024.
Taimanin Asagi 3 Original release dates: JP: December 28, 2012	Release years by system: 2012 – Microsoft Windows
Taimanin Yukikaze 2 Original release dates: JP: May 29, 2015	Release years by system: 2015 – Microsoft Windows; 2019 – Android
Taimanin Yukikaze 2 Original release dates: JP: May 29, 2015	Notes: Re-released in 2019 as Taimanin Yukikaze 2 Animation.
Taimanin Kurenai Original release dates: JP: September 25, 2015	Release years by system: 2015 – Microsoft Windows
Taimanin Asagi ZERO Original release dates: JP: August 31, 2018	Release years by system: 2018 – Microsoft Windows, Android
Mama wa Taimanin Original release dates: JP: April 19, 2019	Release years by system: 2019 – Microsoft Windows, Android

=== Spin-offs ===
Game	Details
Taimanin Asagi Gaiden: Chaos Arena Original release dates: JP: January 13, 2006	Release years by system: 2006 – Microsoft Windows
Taimanin Asagi Gaiden: Chaos Arena Original release dates: JP: January 13, 2006	Notes: Visual novel side story.; Originally sold exclusively at Comiket 69, it was later given a wider digital release.
Taimanin Asagi -Battle Arena- Original release dates: JP: July 1, 2014 – July 31, 2019 (5 years, 4 weeks and 2 days); WW: September 26, 2018 – December 31, 2023 (5 years, 3 months and 5 days)	Release years by system: 2014 – Web browser
Taimanin Asagi -Battle Arena- Original release dates: JP: July 1, 2014 – July 31, 2019 (5 years, 4 weeks and 2 days); WW: September 26, 2018 – December 31, 2023 (5 years, 3 months and 5 days)	Notes: Free-to-play online collectible card game.; Originally released as Taimanin Asagi ~Kessen Arena~, the game ceased service in Japan on July 31, 2019.; Localized by EXNOA and published through Nutaku in 2018 and Johren in 2020.
Taimanin RPG Original release dates: JP: September 25, 2018	Release years by system: 2018 – Web browser
Taimanin RPG Original release dates: JP: September 25, 2018	Notes: Free-to-play role-playing game released exclusively in Japan as Taimanin RPG and Taimanin RPGX.
Action Taimanin Original release dates: JP: December 24, 2019; WW: October 6, 2020	Release years by system: 2019 – iOS, Android; 2020 – Microsoft Windows
Action Taimanin Original release dates: JP: December 24, 2019; WW: October 6, 2020	Notes: Free-to-play 3D action role-playing game developed by Gremory Games.; Announced at Tokyo Game Show 2019 as the series' first all-ages game.
Taimanin Collection: Battle Arena Original release dates: WW: July 9, 2020	Release years by system: 2020 – Microsoft Windows
Taimanin Collection: Battle Arena Original release dates: WW: July 9, 2020	Notes: Free-to-play memory card game using the assets from Taimanin Asagi -Battle Arena-.
Taimanin GOGO! Original release date: JP: May 16, 2023 – January 26, 2024 (8 months, 1 week and 3 days)	Release years by system: 2022 – iOS, Android
Taimanin GOGO! Original release date: JP: May 16, 2023 – January 26, 2024 (8 months, 1 week and 3 days)	Notes: Free-to-play roguelike chibi game developed by Gremory Games.; Ceased operation on January 26, 2024.
Taimanin RPG Extasy Original release dates: WW: October 26, 2023 – August 1, 2024 (9 months and 6 days)	Release years by system: 2023 – iOS, Android, Microsoft Windows, Web browser
Taimanin RPG Extasy Original release dates: WW: October 26, 2023 – August 1, 2024 (9 months and 6 days)	Notes: Port of Taimanin RPG / RPGX with some gameplay modifications.; RPG Extasy is censored and available on iOS, Android, and Steam. RPGX Extasy is uncensored and available on Nutaku and Johren.; Post release, RPG Extasy came under criticism for putting players under premium currency debt after the developer claimed progression rewards were bugged during release.; Ceased operation on August 1, 2024.
Taimanin Squad Original release date: WW: March 4, 2026	Release years by system: 2026 – iOS, Android. Microsoft Windows
Taimanin Squad Original release date: WW: March 4, 2026	Notes: Free-to-play turn-based RPG developed by Gremory Games.; Launched exclusive Galaxy Store open beta on January 15, 2026.; Released in all platforms on March 4, 2026.

=== Compilations ===
Game	Details
Taimanin Asagi PREMIUM BOX Original release dates: JP: November 25, 2011	Release years by system: 2011 – Microsoft Windows
Taimanin Asagi PREMIUM BOX Original release dates: JP: November 25, 2011	Notes: A compilation of Taimanin Asagi, Taimanin Asagi Gaiden: Chaos Arena, Taimanin Asagi 2, Taimanin Asagi Gaiden: The Nightmare, Taimanin Murasaki, and Taimanin Asagi Gaiden: Summer Days with updated visuals.; The Nightmare and Summer Days had previously been released as part of the LILITH-IZM video game compilations series in volumes 02 and 04 respectively.
