= Yukarı =

Yukarı, also spelled Yuxarı, means "upper" in Turkic languages. It may refer to:

== Other ==
- Aşağı, "lower"
