= Action Taimanin =

2019 3D action role-playing mobile game

- Clockwise from top: Yukikaze, Sakura, Asagi
- Developers: Gremory Games; Lilith
- Publishers: Gremory Games; Infini-Brain inc.
- Series: Taimanin
- Engine: Unity
- Platforms: Android, iOS, Microsoft Windows
- Release: JP: December 24, 2019; WW: October 6, 2020
- Genres: Action role-playing, hack and slash
- Modes: Single-player, multiplayer

Action Taimanin (Note: Japanese: アクション対魔忍) is a free-to-play action role-playing game developed and published by Gremory Games for iOS and Android. It was later ported to Microsoft Windows by Lilith and Infini-Brain. The game is an all-ages spin-off of Lilith's Taimanin visual novel series.

== Story ==
Action Taimanin takes place in an alternate near-future Japan. Demons have crossed over from the dark side, breaking the unspoken rules of non-interference. The rule is now obsolete, and a war rages between the humans and demons. As the fight rages on, crime syndicates are taking advantage of the chaos to rise in power. The government established an organization of ninjas called "Taimanins" to fight the demons.

The main quest begins with retrieving a stolen bio-weapon from a UFS base and finishes in chapter 16, part 2. A second story arc has been ongoing since.

== Gameplay ==
Action Taimanin features multiple game modes. The game's main story is covered in Story Mode with self-contained stories taking place in Quest Mode. Time Attack mode challenges players to complete stages in as little time as possible. Special Mode features two minigames: a motorbike obstacle race and a shooting gallery. Arena Mode is a PvP multiplayer mode and Private Room is a decoration and figure pose mode.

By completing objectives, players can unlock additional outfits for their favorite characters. Support characters can aid in combat with various skills and bonding with them unlocks special slice-of-life events.

== Characters ==
In Action Taimanin, the player takes the role of Fuuma Kotarou (ふうま 小太郎), the newly appointed captain of the Taimanin Task Force. Over the course of the game, Kotarou will recruit both playable and non-playable Task Force members. Playable characters can be obtained with in-game currency while Supporters are acquired through gacha banners. The following is a list of playable characters and does not cover the game's Supporters. Since the opening of the global server, the game adds a new playable character every 2 months.

- Igawa Asagi (井河アサギ) Voiced by: Sayumi Watabe (Note: Originally voiced by Ami Koshimizu, in June 2020 the role of Igawa Asagi was recast.)
- Igawa Sakura (井河さくら) Voiced by: Haato Satoyama
- Mizuki Yukikaze (水城ゆきかぜ) Voiced by: Yui Kanbe
- Akiyama Rinko (秋山凜子) Voiced by: Hana Satomi
- Yatsu Murasaki (八津紫) Voiced by: Nami Nakano
- Su Jinglei (スウ・ジンレイ) Voiced by: Marina Inoue
- Mizuki Shiranui (水城不知火) Voiced by: Harumi Asai
- Emily Simmons (エミリー・シモンズ) Voiced by: Saki Minami
- Shinganji Kurenai (心願寺紅) Voiced by: Nanae Sakurai
- Oboro (朧) Voiced by: Hyo-sei
- Koukawa Asuka (甲河アスカ) Voiced by: Juri Nagatsuma
- Onisaki Kirara (鬼崎きらら) Voiced by: Satomi Akesaka
- Ingrid (イングリット) Voiced by: Sayaka Kinoshita
- Noah Brown (ノア・ブラウン) Voiced by: Aoi Koga
- Astaroth (アスタロト) Voiced by: Misa Ishii
- Fuuma Tokiko (ふうま時子) Voiced by: Ayaka Shimizu
- Kousaka Shizuru (高坂静流) Voiced by: Yū Serizawa
- Felicia (フェリシア) Voiced by: Arisa Date
- Kamimura Maika (神村舞華) Voiced by: Megumi Toyoguchi
- Uehara Rin (上原燐) Voiced by: Yukako Kiuchi
- Kannazuki Sora (神無月空) Voiced by: Saya Aizawa (Note: Originally voiced by Runa Narumi, in January 2022 the role of Kannazuki Sora was recast.)
- Annerose Vajra (アンネローゼ・ヴァジュラ) Voiced by: Hikaru Aoi
- Momochi Nagi (桃知凪) Voiced by: Himika Akaneya
- Aina Winchester (アイナ・ウィンチェスター) Voiced by: Asami Sanada
- Fuuma Saika (ふうま 災禍) Voiced by: Yuina Wada
- Amamiya Shisui (天宮紫水) Voiced by: Aoi Koga
- Eleonor (エレオノール) Voiced by: Rie Okamoto
- Aishu Hebiko (相州蛇子) Voiced by: Mai Fuchigami
- Spinel (スピネル) Voiced by: Hiromi Igarashi
- Lina (リーナ) Voiced by: Yūki Kuwahara
- Lapis (ラピス) Voiced by: Yurina Amami
- Phantasma (ファンタスマ) Voiced by: Iori Sekita
- Francis (フランシス) Voiced by: Chiyoko Suama
- Inage Natsu (稲毛夏) Voiced by: Chitose Tsurumaki
- Kichi Azusa (鬼壱あずさ) Voiced by: Kasumi Okudera
- Ragnarok (ラグナロク) Voiced by: Kasumi Okudera
- Mirabell Bell (ミラベル・ベル) Voiced by: Ren Mukai
- Lan Xiang (ラン・シアーン) Voiced by: Rena Maeda
- Cara Cromwell (カーラ・クロムウェル) Voiced by: Kaoru Momozono (Note: Pseudonym of Harumi Asai)
- Kamimura Azuma (神村東) Voiced by: Masami Kato
- Wight (ワイト) Voiced by: Ren Mukai
- Shinohara Mari (篠原まり) Voiced by: Hisako Kanemoto
- Clone Yukikaze (クローン・ゆきかぜ) Voiced by: Yui Kanbe
- Mikami Chizu (魅神 千都) Voiced by: Kanan
- Maya Cordelia (マヤ・コーデリア) Voiced by: Yuri Himuro

== Development ==
Action Taimanin was announced at Tokyo Game Show 2019 as an all-ages 3D action game set in the Taimanin universe. The starting playable characters unveiled were Igawa Asagi, Igawa Sakura, and Mizuki Yukikaze.

== Release ==
Shortly after the Japanese release, users noticed a remixed version of Au5's "Snowblind" was used in-game but the artist wasn't featured in the game's credits. Gremory Games would then issue an apology for copyright infringement and take measures to avoid similar situations in the future.

In September 2020, it was announced that Action Taimanin would be released globally for PC on Steam, as well as on iOS and Android devices. On May 4, 2021, the Japanese and global server merged with the former folding into the latter. The Japanese server final closure took place on July 27, with urging of Lilith and Gremory for Japanese players to register for a transfer.

The global server celebrated its first anniversary with several in-game events lasting for all of October 2021 with a second anniversary event taking place October 2022. Reception to the second anniversary was negative due to Gremory Games introducing the first paid-only character, Annerose from Koutetsu no Majo Annerose, without prior notice after she won the game's 2022 character popularity poll. On October 31st, 2023, the game was released on the South Korean game distribution platform STOVE.

== Reception ==
Sequential Planet complimented the game's visuals and performance as well as it being F2P-friendly. However, they criticized the stamina system, combat, and enemy variety. MMOByte praised the character models and fluid animation but noted that the combat consisted of button mashing. Game Rant called Action Taimanin one of the best free anime games on Steam.
