= Sayumi Watabe =

Japanese voice actress

- 渡部 紗弓
- Born: September 25; Hokkaido, Japan
- Occupation: Voice actress
- Years active: 2010–present
- Agent: Sigma Seven
- Notable work: After the Rain as Akira Tachibana; The Misfit of Demon King Academy as Eleonore Bianca; Apparently, Disillusioned Adventurers Will Save the World as Tiana; 2.5 Dimensional Seduction as Aria Kisaki

Sayumi Watabe (渡部 紗弓, Watabe Sayumi; born September 25) is a Japanese voice actress affiliated with Sigma Seven. Some of her notable roles include Akira Tachibana in After the Rain, Asagi Igawa in Action Taimanin, Eleonore Bianca in The Misfit of Demon King Academy, Freezing Astaroth in Combatants Will Be Dispatched!, Sakura Banka in Build Divide, and Aria Kisaki in 2.5 Dimensional Seduction.

== Filmography ==
=== Television animation ===
2016

- Taboo Tattoo as Fima
- Lostorage incited WIXOSS as Mama

2017

- Minami Kamakura High School Girls Cycling Club as Shiki Mori
- Blood Blockade Battlefront & Beyond as Janet Barlow

2018

- After the Rain as Akira Tachibana

2019

- Boogiepop and Others as Sawako Nakadai
- A Certain Scientific Accelerator as Hasami Hitokawa / Kato
- Beastars as Els
- Didn't I Say to Make My Abilities Average in the Next Life?! as Princess Morena
- Cautious Hero: The Hero Is Overpowered but Overly Cautious as Hestiaca

2020

- Major 2nd as Chiyo Fujii
- The Misfit of Demon King Academy as Eleonore Bianca

2021

- Horimiya as High school girls, elementary school students
- Wixoss Diva(A)Live as Madoka Maka (Madoka)
- Tropical-Rouge! Pretty Cure as Iori
- Combatants Will Be Dispatched! as Freezing Astaroth
- Muv-Luv Alternative as Marimo Jingūji
- Build Divide as Sakura Banka

2023

- Apparently, Disillusioned Adventurers Will Save the World as Tiana
- The Misfit of Demon King Academy 2nd Season as Eleonore Bianca

2024

- Tsukimichi: Moonlit Fantasy 2nd Season as Guinevere Shlesha
- 2.5 Dimensional Seduction as Aria Kisaki
- Tower of God 2nd Season as Yeon Yihwa

2025

- Necronomico and the Cosmic Horror Show as Kei Amakusa

2026

- Jack-of-All-Trades, Party of None as Annery Wiles

=== Original net animation ===
2022

- Spriggan as Kagaho Sasahara

=== Video games ===
2013

- Quiz RPG: The World of Mystic Wiz as Hilde

2019

- Azur Lane as Birmingham

2020

- Action Taimanin as Asagi Igawa

2021

- Figure Story as Vivian
- Project Mikhail as Marimo Jingūji
- Gran Saga as Fiona

2022

- Path to Nowhere as Crache

2023

- Mobile Suit Gundam: Iron-Blooded Orphans G as Slice Xhosa
- Taimanin Gogo! as Asagi Igawa
