= Jingai-san no Yome =

Japanese anime and manga series

- Cover of Jingai-san no Yome volume 1 by Ichijinsha

人外さんの嫁
- Genre: Comedy, Fantasy, Romance
- Manga
- Written by: Yu Aikawa
- Illustrated by: Akiwo Yasaka
- Published by: Ichijinsha
- Imprint: Zero-Sum Comics
- Magazine: Zero-Sum Online
- Original run: June 2016 – present
- Volumes: 12
- Anime television series
- Directed by: Hisayoshi Hirasawa (chief); Takumi Shibata
- Written by: Words in Stereo
- Music by: Kōhei Miyahara
- Studio: Saetta
- Original network: Tokyo MX, BS Fuji
- Original run: October 2, 2018 – December 18, 2018
- Episodes: 12

Jingai-san no Yome (人外さんの嫁; lit. 'Non-Human Creature's Wife') is a Japanese four-panel manga series written by Yu Aikawa and illustrated by Akiwo Yasaka, serialized online via Ichijinsha's Zero-Sum Online website since June 2016. It has been collected in twelve tankōbon volumes. An anime television series adaptation by Saetta premiered from October 2 to December 18, 2018.

== Plot ==
Tomari Hinowa is a normal high school boy, until one day he is told that he has to become the wife of a mysterious creature called Kanenogi. This is the start of their newly married life.

== Characters ==
=== Humans ===
Tomari Hinowa (日ノ輪 泊, Hinowa Tomari)
Voiced by: Daiki Yamashita
A high schooler living alone who becomes Kanenogi's wife. He is hesitant at first about his marriage to Kanenogi, but starts to warm up to them. He falls in love with his partner's soft fur first then it develops into all around love.
Sora Hikurakawa (火鞍川 曽良, Hikurakawa Sora)
Voiced by: Kengo Kawanishi
Classmate of Tomari, invites him into the wives club and they talk about being with their special spouses. He has dyed blonde hair, piercings and is a little too lovey dovey for his partner, Fuwai.
Ichiya Mokusaibashi (木齋橋 壱屋, Mokusaibashi Ichiya)
Voiced by: Taku Yashiro
"Bad boy" of the class but a total softie when it comes to his partner, Tsukitsuka. He actually requested to be chosen as their wife. He starts to blush if the bandages of Tsukitsuka start to fall off leaving empty space. He also drew dot eyes and a smile on the bandages to represent a face
Tetsukasa Tsuchikiyose (土清世 徹司, Tsuchikiyose Tetsukasa)
Voiced by: Yusuke Shirai
The student council president and wife to both Roku and Nana.

=== Creatures ===
Kanenogi (カネノギ)
A large, fluffy creature and Tomari's husband. It likes to gently chew on Tomari's head and eat concrete.
Fuwai (フワ井)
A small, pink creature and Sora's husband. It is sensitive about its hair growth and will get angry if anyone tries to remove its hat.
Tsukitsuka (ツキツカ)
A bandage creature and Mokusaibashi's husband. It can communicate through writing on paper and can control its bandages.
Roku (六) and Nana (七)
Voiced by: Satomi Arai
A pair of one-eyed and one-winged twins and Tetsukasa's husbands. Roku has dark purple hair, while Nana's hair is light purple. They only eat food additives.

== Media ==
=== Manga ===
No.	Release date	ISBN
1	September 24, 2016	978-4758032308
2	January 25, 2017	978-4758032568
3	July 25, 2017	978-4758033022
4	January 25, 2018	978-4758033299
5	June 25, 2018	978-4758033565
6	September 25, 2018	978-4758033886
7	December 25, 2018	978-4758034074
8	May 25, 2019	978-4758034371 (regular edition); 978-4758034388 (special edition)
9	January 27, 2020	978-4758034876
10	June 25, 2020	978-4758035231 (regular edition); 978-4758035224 (special edition)
11	December 24, 2020	978-4758035705
12	May 25, 2021	978-4758036108

=== Anime ===
No.	Title	Original release date
1	"Non-Human Creature Wife"; Transliteration: "Jingai-san no Yome" (Japanese: 人外さんの嫁)	October 2, 2018
2	"We Got Married"; Transliteration: "Nyūseki shimashita" (Japanese: 入籍しました)	October 9, 2018
3	"Classmate and Wife"; Transliteration: "Kurasumeito to yome" (Japanese: クラスメイトと嫁)	October 16, 2018
4	"Transfer Student and Wife"; Transliteration: "Tenkōsei to yome" (Japanese: 転校生と嫁)	October 23, 2018
5	"Falling, Day by Day"; Transliteration: "Oboreru hibi" (Japanese: 溺れる日々)	October 30, 2018
6	"Exchanging Rings"; Transliteration: "Yubiwa no kōkan" (Japanese: 指輪の交換)	November 6, 2018
7	"Our First Summer Vacation"; Transliteration: "Hajimete no natsuyasumi" (Japanese: 初めての夏休み)	November 13, 2018
8	"Sports Festival"; Transliteration: "Undōkai" (Japanese: 運動会)	November 20, 2018
9	"Flu and Wife"; Transliteration: "Kaze to fukujū" (Japanese: 風邪と嫁)	November 27, 2018
10	"Everyone's White Day"; Transliteration: "Sora re no howaitodē" (Japanese: そられのホワイトデー)	December 4, 2018
11	"1st Anniversary"	December 11, 2018
12	"Feelings, Forever, Together"; Transliteration: "Omoi, zutto, issho" (Japanese: 想い、ずっと、一緒)	December 18, 2018
