= Runa Narumi =

Japanese voice actress and singer

- 成海 瑠奈
- Born: 19 November 1995 (age 30)
- Occupations: Voice actress; singer
- Years active: 2015–2021
- Employer: Stardust Promotion
- Notable work: Yuika Mitsumine in The Idolmaster Shiny Colors
- Musical career
- Formerly of: SoundOrion

Runa Narumi (Japanese: 成海 瑠奈, Hepburn: Narumi Runa; born 19 November 1995) is a Japanese former voice actress and singer from Onomichi, Hiroshima Prefecture. Until her retirement on New Year's Eve 2021, she was part of her agency Stardust Promotion's voice actor unit SoundOrion and voiced Yuika Mitsumine in The Idolmaster Shiny Colors.

== Biography ==
=== Early life ===
Runa Narumi, a native of Onomichi, Hiroshima Prefecture, was born on 19 November 1995. While in high school deciding on what job to get afterwards, she discovered her love of anime and games, and after her high school graduation, she enrolled in the voice acting and anime song course at Yoyogi Animation Academy's Hiroshima campus. Inspired by her Yoyogi classmates, she transferred to Yoyogi's Tokyo campus during her second year after a successful audition. After she graduated from Yoyogi, she joined Stardust Promotion.

=== Career ===
During the start of her voice acting career, she aimed to become "a multi-talented voice actor who could sing and dance", but eventually moved on to a new intention to "become a voice actor that you wouldn't get tired of". In September 2019, she was cast as Aoi Nekogahora in Bushiroad's Rebirth anime shorts. She had minor roles in Jingai-san no Yome, Rifle Is Beautiful, Argonavis from BanG Dream!, Interspecies Reviewers, and Yatogame-chan Kansatsu Nikki.

She voiced Yuika Mitsumine, one of the five members of the unit L'Antica, in The Idolmaster Shiny Colors, a spinoff of The Idolmaster franchise. As part of the franchise, she performed in several of L'Antica's singles, two of which reached the Top 10 in the Oricon Singles Chart. She was also part of her agency's voice actor unit SoundOrion.

=== Retirement ===
On 6 October 2021, about thirty minutes before a Shiny Colors live broadcast she was scheduled to appear in, it was announced that she would be canceling her appearance due to health issues. On 15 October, her agency announced that she would be on an indefinite career hiatus due to health issues. On 18 October, it was announced that she would be leaving SoundOrion due to "difficulties" with the group, and that several of their events would be cancelled, including the 27 October release of their first album Märch and related events. On 29 December 2021, her agency announced that she would be retiring on 31 December.

Following her retirement, some of her characters received replacement voice actors. In January 2022, it was announced that Shio Kisui would replace her as the voice actress for Yuika Mitsumine. Sachika Misawa was recast as Narumi's replacement as the voice actor for the Onsen Musume character Mikasa Sengokuhara.

== Filmography ==
=== Anime ===
2018

- Jingai-san no Yome, female student

2019

- Rifle Is Beautiful, Haruna Tani

2020

- Argonavis from BanG Dream!, high school girl A
- Interspecies Reviewers, Raimii
- Rebirth, Aoi Nekogahora
- Yatogame-chan Kansatsu Nikki, girl from Hiroshima

=== Video games ===
2017

- Hōchi Shōjo

2018

- The Idolmaster Shiny Colors, Yuika Mitsumine
- Tenkū no Craftfleet, Mizuka Warmin

2019

- Knights Chronicle, Euroa
- Kurokishi to Shiro no Maou, Toyotomi Hideyoshi
- Monster Strike, Lewis Carroll

2020

- Blue Oath, Franklin, Hiraumi
- BraveSword X BlazeSoul, Seireitei Electeri
- CHOJO: CryptoGirlsArena, Amina Kokado
- Death End Request 2, Christina Serum
- Gyakuten Othellonia, Haru
- KonoSuba: God's Blessing on this Wonderful World! Fantastic Days, Erika
- Nyan Gurira, Titi
- Sen no Kazoku, Mitty

=== Stage ===
2016

- Tēkyu: Senpai to Meguriau Jikan-tachi (as Runa Yamaguchi)

=== Dubbing ===
2015

- Full Strike

=== Other ===
- Onsen Musume, Mikasa Sengokuhara
