= 2.5 Dimensional Seduction =

Japanese manga series and its adaptation(s)

- First tankōbon volume cover, featuring Lilysa Amano as Liliel (left) and herself (right)

2.5次元の誘惑(リリサ) (Nitengo-jigen no Ririsa)
- Genre: Harem; Romantic comedy
- Manga
- Written by: Yu Hashimoto
- Published by: Shueisha
- English publisher: NA: Seven Seas Entertainment
- Imprint: Jump Comics+
- Magazine: Shōnen Jump+
- Original run: June 15, 2019 – December 20, 2025
- Volumes: 25
- Anime television series
- Directed by: Hideki Okamoto
- Produced by: Naoki Hara; Masahiko Takeuchi; Kuninori Yoshizaki; Akihiro Sotokawa; Atsushi Fujishiro; Yurie Uehara
- Written by: Takao Yoshioka
- Music by: Hiroaki Tsutsumi
- Studio: J.C.Staff
- Licensed by: Sentai Filmworks
- Original network: Tokyo MX, tvk, CTC, Teletama, TV Aichi, MBS, TVQ, BS11, AT-X, Animax
- Original run: July 5, 2024 – present
- Episodes: 24
- icon

2.5 Dimensional Seduction (Japanese: 2.5次元の誘惑(リリサ), Hepburn: Nitengo-jigen no Ririsa; transl. "2.5 Dimensional Lilysa"), (Note: The kanji 誘惑 in the Japanese title, glossed with furigana as Ririsa (リリサ), are normally read as Yūwaku ("temptation", "lure", "allurement", or "seduction").) abbreviated as Nigoriri (にごリリ), is a Japanese manga series written and illustrated by Yu Hashimoto. It was serialized on Shueisha's Shōnen Jump+ website from June 2019 to December 2025, with its chapters collected in twenty-five tankōbon volumes. An anime television series adaptation produced by J.C.Staff aired from July to December 2024. A second season has been announced.

== Premise ==
Masamune Okumura is a second-year high school student who serves as the president and only member of his school's manga club. An otaku, he claims he has no interest in real girls due to his obsession with a fictional character named Liliel (リリエル, Ririeru). Suddenly, a first-year student named Lilysa Amano, who is passionate about cosplay, joins the club and recruits Okumura to be her official photographer. When Okumura learns her favorite character is also Liliel, he starts to fall in love with her, making him feel conflicted. Other girls soon join the club as well, including Okumura's childhood friend Mikari Tachibana, whose unrequited love for him constantly leaves her frustrated.

== Characters ==
Masamune Okumura (奥村 正宗, Okumura Masamune)
Voiced by: Junya Enoki (Japanese); Jack Stansbury (English)
Okumura is a second-year high school student who is the president of his school's manga club. He is an otaku who has been obsessed with a fictional character named Liliel since he was young. He has put up posters of Liliel in the club room and has DVDs of her anime series. His mother abandoned his family when he was young. Initially, he did not like the idea of falling in love or having a relationship, which resulted in him isolating himself from others. However, as the story progresses, he begins to open up thanks to the girls in the manga club.
Lilysa Amano (天乃 リリサ, Amano Ririsa)
Voiced by: Kaori Maeda (Japanese); Shanae'a Moore (English)
Lilysa is a beautiful first-year student who joins the manga club. Due to her passion for cosplay, she recruits Okumura to be her photographer. Like Okumura, she is also a fan of Liliel. She was first inspired to become a cosplayer when she visited a cosplay event. She wears glasses outside of cosplay. Though initially oblivious, she starts to slowly fall in love with Okumura later on.
Mikari Tachibana (橘 美花莉, Tachibana Mikari)
Voiced by: Akari Kitō (Japanese); Jade Kelly (English)
Mikari is a first-year student who is Okumura's childhood friend and Lilysa's classmate. A gorgeous and popular model, she has a crush on Okumura since they were young, which he has never noticed. At the end of the series, she and Okumura begin dating after they confess their feelings for each other.
753♡
Voiced by: Aya Yamane (Japanese); Chaney Moore (English)
753♡ is a professional cosplayer. Due to her popularity, she is considered to be one of the four Heavenly Queens of Cosplay. Her stage name is pronounced as "Nagomi" (なごみ). She takes an interest in Okumura as he looks like exactly like her favorite character, Prince Kai.
Magino (マギノ)
Voiced by: Yuka Nukui (Japanese); Courtney Lomelo (English)
Magino is a cosplayer who is willing to give Lilysa and Okumura advice.
Ogino (オギノ)
Voiced by: Tomokazu Sugita (Japanese); Benjamin McLaughlin (English)
Ogino is a photographer who hangs out with Magino. He serves as a mentor for Okumura.
Mayuri Hanyu (羽生 まゆり, Hanyū Mayuri)
Voiced by: M.A.O (Japanese); Shelley Calene-Black (English)
Mayuri is a popular new high school teacher who becomes the advisor of the manga club. She is a former cosplayer known as Mayura (まゆら), one of the four Heavenly Queens of Cosplay. Later on, she reconnects and enters into a relationship with her female best friend, Eli.
Nonoa (ノノア)
Voiced by: Sayumi Suzushiro (Japanese); Cat Thomas (English)
Nonoa is a rookie cosplayer who is a huge fan of Lilysa. Having experienced trauma in the past, she has a shy personality. She desperately wants to befriend Lilysa, but has trouble doing so due to her anxiety and insecurity.
Aria Kisaki (喜咲アリア, Kisaki Aria)
Voiced by: Sayumi Watabe (Japanese); Christina Kelly (English)
Aria is a gyaru and a new cosplayer who does not have much knowledge about anime and manga. She is the daughter of manga artist Yoichi Higarashi and originally took up cosplay to reach him, as her parents got divorced when she was young. As the series progresses, she starts to develop feelings for Okumura.
Yoichi Higarashi (日枯 陽一, Higarashi Yōichi) / Yo Kisaki (キサキ ヨウ, Kisaki Yō)
Voiced by: Junichi Suwabe (Japanese); John Swasey (English)
Higarashi is a manga artist who is the author of Liliel: Side Story, a spinoff manga of Ash's War Chronicles, and Aria's father. He previously created the manga Valkyries Battlefield, which was quickly cancelled due to its poor reception and sales. His only fan letter came from Okumura, which he continues to treasure. Despite his previous failures as a manga artist, the fan letter helped inspire him to continue his career. His real name is Yo Kisaki.

== Media ==
=== Manga ===
Written and illustrated by Yu Hashimoto, the series was serialized on Shueisha's Shōnen Jump+ manga website from June 15, 2019, to December 20, 2025. Shueisha collected its chapters in twenty-five tankōbon volumes, released from October 4, 2019, to February 4, 2026.

In June 2021, Seven Seas Entertainment announced that they licensed the series for English publication under their Ghost Ship imprint.

=== Anime ===
An anime television series adaptation was announced on December 10, 2022. It was produced by J.C.Staff and directed by Hideki Okamoto, with scripts written by Takao Yoshioka, character designs handled by Tomoyuki Shitaya, and music composed by Hiroaki Tsutsumi. The series aired from July 5 to December 13, 2024, on Tokyo MX and other networks. For the first cour, the opening theme song is "Shutter Chance" (シャッターチャンス, Shattāchansu), performed by Meychan, while the ending theme song is "Watch Me", performed by Kaori Maeda and Akari Kitō as their respective characters. For the second cour, the opening theme song is "Tsugihagi no Tsubasa" (ツギハギの翼; "A Wing's Patchwork"), performed by Soraru, while the ending theme song is "Release Sigh", performed by Kaori Maeda, Akari Kitō, Sayumi Suzushiro and Sayumi Watabe as their respective characters. Sentai Filmworks licensed the series in North America, Australia and British Isles for streaming on Hidive.

Following the airing of the final episode of the first season, a second season was announced.

=== Video game ===
An online role-playing video game developed by Aiming and Team Caravan, titled 2.5 Dimensional Seduction: Angels on Stage (2.5次元の誘惑(リリサ) 天使たちのステージ, Nitengo-jigen no Ririsa Tenshitachi no Sutēji), was announced during Jump Festa 2024. It was released for iOS and Android on September 3, 2024. A PC version was released on October 31, 2024. The English and Simplified Chinese versions ended service on January 14, 2026.

== Reception ==
Itachi Utada from Famitsu praised the story and characters of the series, particularly enjoying the cosplay elements present.

In the 2020 Next Manga Award, the series ranked fourth in the web manga category. By January 2022, the series had one million copies in circulation between its digital and print releases.
