= Sound! Euphonium: The Movie – May the Melody Reach You! =

2017 Japanese animated film by Taichi Ogawa

- Theatrical release poster
- Kanji: 劇場版 響け！ユーフォニアム ～届けたいメロディ～
- Revised Hepburn: Gekijōban Hibike! Yūfoniamu: Todoketai Merodi
- Directed by: Taichi Ogawa; Tatsuya Ishihara (Note: His role is credited as Chief director (総監督, Sō kantoku).)
- Screenplay by: Jukki Hanada
- Based on: Sound! Euphonium by Ayano Takeda
- Produced by: Nagaharu Ohashi; Shinichi Nakamura; Shigeru Saitō; Riri Senami; Yoshifumi Yarimizu
- Starring: Tomoyo Kurosawa; Ayaka Asai; Moe Toyota; Chika Anzai; Minako Kotobuki; Saori Hayami; Minori Chihara; Haruki Ishiya; Manami Numakura; Takahiro Sakurai
- Cinematography: Kazuya Takao
- Edited by: Kengo Shigemura
- Music by: Akito Matsuda
- Production company: Kyoto Animation
- Distributed by: Shochiku
- Release date: September 30, 2017
- Running time: 105 minutes
- Country: Japan
- Language: Japanese
- Box office: ¥130 million

Sound! Euphonium: The Movie – May the Melody Reach You! (Japanese: 劇場版 響け！ユーフォニアム ～届けたいメロディ～, Hepburn: Gekijōban Hibike! Yūfoniamu: Todoketai Merodi) is a 2017 Japanese animated film that serves as a recap of the second season of the anime television series Sound! Euphonium, which itself is based on the novel series of the same name by Ayano Takeda. Produced by Kyoto Animation and distributed by Shochiku, the film is directed by Taichi Ogawa (in his directorial debut) from a script written by Jukki Hanada. The film centers on Kitauji High School concert band's vice president Asuka Tanaka during their preparation for the national competition.

The second compilation film of the anime series was announced in March 2017. The staff and cast of the film were revealed in June 2017.

Sound! Euphonium: The Movie – May the Melody Reach You! premiered in Japan on September 30, 2017. The film grossed ¥130 million in Japan and received a nomination at the Japan Media Arts Festival.

== Plot ==
In the past, a young Asuka Tanaka receives a euphonium from someone named Shindō. Back at present, following their victory at the Kansai band competition, the Kitauji High School Concert Band performs during their school's cultural festival. Since the festival, Kumiko Ōmae begins to notice a facade behind Asuka's positive personality. Following the band's training camp to prepare for the national band competition, Noboru Taki announces an upcoming concert at an open area in a train station. Kumiko then finds Asuka and her mother Akemi in the faculty room, where the latter is forcing Mr. Taki to accept Asuka's resignation from the band to help her focus on the entrance examination at college. Rumors of Asuka quitting the band reaches her bandmates. Band president Haruka Ogasawara tells them to show Asuka their support.

On the day of the station concert, Asuka arrives and joins the band in performing the piece "Takarajima". Since then, she attends band practice rarely. After band practice, Mr. Taki announces that Asuka might be replaced by another euphonist Natsuki Nakagawa if she fails to continue with the band by the end of the week. Asuka invites Kumiko over to her house to tutor her on the midterm. During her stay, Kumiko learns that Asuka is the daughter of Masakazu Shindō, a famous euphonist, and her father will serve as a judge at the nationals. Taking a break from studying, Asuka invites Kumiko to the riverbank to listen to a piece that her father composed. At school, Kumiko overhears Asuka's decision to focus on the entrance exam. She pleads with Asuka to reconsider so she does not regret her decision in the future, but Asuka already plans to continue playing with the band by using the mock exam that she has passed as leverage to convince her mother.

On the day of the nationals, Kitauji High School Concert Band performs the piece "Crescent Moon Dance". The band fails to win the competition after receiving a bronze medal. Mr. Taki then relies on Asuka a message from his father complimenting her performance. Following the graduation of third-year students, Kumiko meets up with Asuka one last time. Asuka then gives her father's notebook to Kumiko, who finds from it the piece she heard at the riverbank is titled "Sound! Euphonium".

== Voice cast ==
- Tomoyo Kurosawa as Kumiko Ōmae
- Ayaka Asai as Hazuki Katō
- Moe Toyota as Sapphire Kawashima
- Chika Anzai as Reina Kōsaka
- Minako Kotobuki as Asuka Tanaka
- Saori Hayami as Haruka Ogasawara
- Minori Chihara as Kaori Nakaseko
- Yōko Hikasa as Aoi Saitō
- Haruki Ishiya as Shūichi Tsukamoto
- Konomi Fujimura as Natsuki Nakagawa
- Yuri Yamaoka as Yūko Yoshikawa
- Atsumi Tanezaki as Mizore Yoroizuka
- Nao Tōyama as Nozomi Kasaki
- Kenjiro Tsuda as Takuya Gotō
- Miyuki Kobori as Riko Nagase
- Manami Numakura as Mamiko Ōmae
- Hiroshi Naka as Kentarō Ōmae
- Haruhi Nanao as Akiko Ōmae
- Taisuke Nishimura as Vice principal
- Kumiko Watanabe as Akemi Tanaka
- Aya Hisakawa as Michie Matsumoto
- Yuichi Nakamura as Masahiro Hashimoto
- Houko Kuwashima as Satomi Nīyama
- Takahiro Sakurai as Noboru Taki

== Production ==
Kyoto Animation revealed the production of the second anime film of Sound! Euphonium franchise in March 2017. The film would serve as a recap of the second season of the anime series Sound! Euphonium, similar to how the 2016 anime film Sound! Euphonium: The Movie – Welcome to the Kitauji High School Concert Band recapped the first season. The film revealed its subtitle, May the Melody Reach You! (届けたいメロディ, Todoketai Merodi), in June 2017. That month, Tatsuya Ishihara and Taichi Ogawa were revealed as the chief director and director of the film, respectively. This would be Ogawa's film directorial debut after previously working with the storyboard of the episodes "Ready Set, Monaka" from the first season and "Awakening Oboe" from the second season of the anime series. Despite the project being categorized as a compilation film at the start of the production, Ogawa intended to make it as a stand-alone film to "express the meaning of my work, or my directorial style" and to avoid making it "a digest movie just crammed with good scenes". He focused the film's story on the characters Kumiko Ōmae and Asuka Tanaka because depicting all the three stories about them, Mizore Yoroizuka and Nozomi Kasaki, and Kumiko and her older sister Mamiko from the second season "would be about the volume of two movies" and he heard that Kyoto Animation had plans to release a film about Mizore and Nozomi.

The staff joining the directors were also revealed in June 2017, including Jukki Hanada as the screenwriter, Shoko Ikeda as the character designer, Mutsuo Shinohara as the art director, and Kazuya Takao as the cinematographer. Additionally, Tomoyo Kurosawa, Ayaka Asai, Moe Toyota, Chika Anzai, Minako Kotobuki, Saori Hayami, Minori Chihara, Haruki Ishiya, Manami Numakura, and Takahiro Sakurai were set to reprise their voice roles from the second season for the film. The cast did re-record their lines from the second season for the film.

== Music ==
In June 2017, Akito Matsuda was revealed to be composing Sound! Euphonium: The Movie – May the Melody Reach You!. Matsuda arranged the theme song of the second season of Sound! Euphonium, now titled "Soundscape (True & Wind Orchestra Ver.)" (サウンドスケープ (TRUE & Wind Orchestra Ver.)), to be used as the film's theme song. The original soundtrack of the film, subtitled The Only Melody (stylized in sentence case), was released in Japan on September 27, 2017, and digitally on April 4, 2022.

All music is composed by Matsuda, except where indicated.

Sound! Euphonium: The Movie – Original Soundtrack: The Only Melody track listing
| No. | Title | Music | Length |
|---|---|---|---|
| 1. | "Soundscape ~Loving Nostalgia Ver.~" | Takuya Watanabe | 6:33 |
| 2. | "Young Origin" | | 0:46 |
| 3. | "The Time Called Now" | | 1:43 |
| 4. | "Hidden Emotions" | | 1:41 |
| 5. | "Things Bound by the Heart" | | 1:34 |
| 6. | "Rehearsal Camp Begins" | | 0:37 |
| 7. | "Around the Brain" | | 0:50 |
| 8. | "Emerging Crisis" | | 2:36 |
| 9. | "Towards Many Fears" | | 2:01 |
| 10. | "Awakening Friends" | | 2:03 |
| 11. | "Face to Face" | | 0:37 |
| 12. | "Gears That Do Not Mesh" | | 0:52 |
| 13. | "Staying Rain Clouds" | | 1:32 |
| 14. | "Beginning Memories" | | 0:37 |
| 15. | "Circumstances to Be Told" | | 3:58 |
| 16. | "Lined-up Instruments" | | 1:22 |
| 17. | "Thoughts to Be Washed Out" | | 1:19 |
| 18. | "The Knowing of Loss" | | 1:15 |
| 19. | "Determination To Face" | | 1:09 |
| 20. | "Two Opposing Players" | | 2:15 |
| 21. | "The Moment When Feelings Are Understood" | | 2:15 |
| 22. | "Two Instruments Line Up Again" | | 1:35 |
| 23. | "Hearts That Inspire" | | 1:55 |
| 24. | "Current Ability and Evaluation" | | 1:43 |
| 25. | "Regained Origin" | | 0:56 |
| 26. | "Time of Approach" | | 1:35 |
| 27. | "Beginning and End" | | 4:24 |
| 28. | "Soundscape (True & Wind Orchestra Ver.)" | Watanabe | 5:25 |
| Total length: | | | 55:08 |

== Marketing ==
Sound! Euphonium: The Movie – May the Melody Reach You! released its teaser trailer and key visual on June 4, 2017. The main trailer and key visual for the film were released on August 1, 2017. The following month, a three-part public commemorative program featuring the voice actresses of the film's third-year students, second-year students, and first-year students was held. Promotional partners for the film included the Japanese Red Cross Society via its blood center in Kyoto, Pioneer via the release of a collaboration headphones, and the Kansai Band Association.

== Release ==
=== Theatrical ===
Sound! Euphonium: The Movie – May the Melody Reach You! was released in Japan on September 30, 2017. The film held its North American premiere at Anime NYC in November 2018. In light of the arson attack at Kyoto Animation, Shochiku held a special screening for the films produced by the studio "to create an opportunity for people to be able to watch... works... by Kyoto Animation on the big screen"; May the Melody Reach You! was screened at Shinjuku Piccadilly Cinema in Tokyo on September 2, 2019, and at Movix in Kyoto on November 1.

=== Home media ===
Sound! Euphonium: The Movie – May the Melody Reach You! was released on Blu-ray and DVD in Japan on March 7, 2018. The film was released on Hulu Japan on February 6, 2022, on DMM TV on March 15, 2023, and on Amazon Prime Video in Japan on April 22.

Eleven Arts released the film on video on demand in the United States and Canada on December 1, 2020. The film was streamed on Tubi on April 8, 2021, and on Crunchyroll on December 8, 2022.

== Reception ==
Sound! Euphonium: The Movie – May the Melody Reach You! grossed ¥130 million in Japan. Director Makoto Shinkai praised the film, stating that the "script, picture, sound, color, composition, voice acting, and everything [in the film] were wonderfully splendid." Despite being a compilation film, Shinkai was surprised that he had not noticed it to be a re-edit of the second season while watching it and felt it was a "wonderful, independent coming-of-age film." The film was selected as a Jury Recommended Work at the Japan Media Arts Festival in 2018.
