= Sound! Euphonium: The Movie – Welcome to the Kitauji High School Concert Band =

2016 Japanese animated film by Tatsuya Ishihara

- Theatrical release poster
- Kanji: 劇場版 響け！ユーフォニアム ～北宇治高校吹奏楽部へようこそ～
- Revised Hepburn: Gekijōban Hibike! Yūfoniamu: Kitauji Kōkō Suisōgaku-bu e Yōkoso
- Directed by: Tatsuya Ishihara
- Screenplay by: Jukki Hanada
- Based on: Sound! Euphonium by Ayano Takeda
- Produced by: Nagaharu Ohashi; Shinichi Nakamura; Shigeru Saitō
- Starring: Tomoyo Kurosawa; Ayaka Asai; Moe Toyota; Chika Anzai; Minako Kotobuki; Saori Hayami; Minori Chihara; Haruki Ishiya; Takahiro Sakurai
- Cinematography: Kazuya Takao
- Edited by: Kengo Shigemura
- Music by: Akito Matsuda
- Production company: Kyoto Animation
- Distributed by: Shochiku
- Release date: April 23, 2016
- Running time: 103 minutes
- Country: Japan
- Language: Japanese
- Box office: ¥220 million

Sound! Euphonium: The Movie – Welcome to the Kitauji High School Concert Band (Japanese: 劇場版 響け！ユーフォニアム ～北宇治高校吹奏楽部へようこそ～, Hepburn: Gekijōban Hibike! Yūfoniamu: Kitauji Kōkō Suisōgaku-bu e Yōkoso) is a 2016 Japanese animated film that serves as a recap of the 2015 anime television series Sound! Euphonium, which itself is based on the novel series of the same name by Ayano Takeda. Produced by Kyoto Animation and distributed by Shochiku, the film is directed by Tatsuya Ishihara from a script written by Jukki Hanada. The film follows first-year high school student Kumiko Ōmae joining the concert band of Kitauji High School.

The film was announced in October 2015. Several of the cast and the staff from the anime series were confirmed to be returning for the film in December 2015.

Sound! Euphonium: The Movie – Welcome to the Kitauji High School Concert Band premiered in Japan on April 23, 2016. The film grossed ¥220 million in Japan and received a nomination at the Japan Media Arts Festival.

== Plot ==
The concert band of Daikichiyama Middle School, where euphonist Kumiko Ōmae and trumpeter Reina Kōsaka attend, obtains a "dud gold" at the Japanese national band competition. Kumiko's comment on the impossibility to win the competition has caused a rift between her and Reina. Kumiko, now a first-year high school student at Kitauji High School, finds the school's band out of tune. She then befriends Hazuki Katō and Sapphire Kawashima. The three of them visit the band, during which Kumiko gets surprised to see Reina attending the same school and joining the band. After Kumiko decided to join the members as a euphonist, the band meets their new advisor Noboru Taki, who asks them about their goal for the year. The band decides to win the national band competition, but their first ensemble practice has ended poorly causing Mr. Taki to dissent from their plan to perform at Sunrise Festival. Mr. Taki holds practices with the band before their second ensemble practice. He becomes impressed with the result of the band's ensemble practice and agrees to help them with the Sunrise Festival. On the day of the festival, the Kitauji High School Concert Band's marching performance of the piece "Rydeen" garnered the attention of spectators.

Mr. Taki announces an audition for the competition, where a 55-member band is required. During the Agata Festival, Hazuki gets rejected by Shūichi Tsukamoto after she confessed to him, while Kumiko and Reina, who have reconciled, play the piece "Ai o Mitsuketa Basho". Following the end of the audition, the members who will be competing are announced. Afterward, Reina is selected to be playing a solo piece instead of trumpeter Kaori Nakaseko. The result of the audition, particularly about Reina being selected for the solo part, is not received well, causing a rumor about Mr. Taki favoring Reina due to their shared history. Mr. Taki decides to hold a second audition between Reina and Kaori for the solo piece. After the audition, Kaori gives the solo part to Reina despite being selected by Mr. Taki. During an ensemble practice, Kumiko is struggling with a part of her piece. Mr. Taki then asks Asuka Tanaka to play that part solo, causing Kumiko to emotionally break down as she goes home. Returning to school, Kumiko is encouraged by Mr. Taki to continue practicing that part. On the day of the Kansai Band Competition Preliminary, Kitauji High School Concert Band performs the piece "Crescent Moon Dance". The band then wins the competition.

== Voice cast ==
- Tomoyo Kurosawa as Kumiko Ōmae
- Ayaka Asai as Hazuki Katō
- Moe Toyota as Sapphire Kawashima
- Chika Anzai as Reina Kōsaka
- Minako Kotobuki as Asuka Tanaka
- Saori Hayami as Haruka Ogasawara
- Minori Chihara as Kaori Nakaseko
- Haruki Ishiya as Shūichi Tsukamoto
- Kenjiro Tsuda as Takuya Gotō
- Miyuki Kobori as Riko Nagase
- Konomi Fujimura as Natsuki Nakagawa
- Yuri Yamaoka as Yuko Yoshikawa
- Azusa Tadokoro as Azusa Sazaki
- Haruhi Nanao as Akiko Ōmae
- Aya Hisakawa as Michie Matsumoto
- Takahiro Sakurai as Noboru Taki

== Production ==
Kyoto Animation announced an anime film, subtitled Welcome to the Kitauji High School Concert Band (～北宇治高校吹奏楽部へようこそ～, Kitauji Kōkō Suisōgaku-bu e Yōkoso), at the Kyoani and Do Fan Days event in October 2015. The film would serve as a recap of the anime television series adaptation of the novel series Sound! Euphonium by Ayano Takeda. The staff working on the film at Kyoto Animation were revealed in December 2015, including Tatsuya Ishihara as the director, Jukki Hanada as the screenwriter, Shoko Ikeda as the character designer, Mutsuo Shinohara as the art director, and Kazuya Takao as the cinematographer. That month, Tomoyo Kurosawa, Ayaka Asai, Moe Toyota, Chika Anzai, Minako Kotobuki, Saori Hayami, Minori Chihara, Haruki Ishiya, and Takahiro Sakurai were set to reprise their voice roles from the anime series. The cast re-recorded all the lines for the film. During the film's event at AnimeJapan in March 2016, Sakurai confirmed that the song "Rydeen" performed by Yellow Magic Orchestra would be played in full, as opposed to what was seen in the anime series.

== Music ==
In December 2015, Akito Matsuda was revealed to be composing Sound! Euphonium: The Movie – Welcome to the Kitauji High School Concert Band. In March 2016, True was announced to be performing the theme song "Dream Solister" for the film, which was first used as the opening theme song for the anime series. The original soundtrack of the film, subtitled Reflection of Youthful Music (stylized in sentence case), was released in Japan on April 27, 2016, and digitally on April 4, 2022. The musical composition featured in the film are "Orpheus in the Underworld" by Jacques Offenbach, "Abarenbō Shōgun Theme" by Shunsuke Kikuchi, "Marines' Hymn" by James M. Fulton, Symphony No. 9 in E Minor, Op. 95, "From the New World", 2nd Movement by Antonín Dvořák, "The Fairest of the Fair" by John Philip Sousa, "Funiculì, Funiculà" by Luigi Denza, "Rydeen" by Yukihiro Takahashi, "Ai o Mitsuketa Basho" by Hanako Oku, "Wind of Provence" by Naoki Tasaka, and "Crescent Moon Dance" by Matsuda.

Sound! Euphonium: The Movie – Original Soundtrack: Reflection of Youthful Music track listing
No.	Title	Length
1.	"Our Melody Begins"	1:17
2.	"Among Fluttering Cherry Blossoms"	0:52
3.	"School Life"	1:57
4.	"The Future Is Yet to Be Seen"	1:17
5.	"Introduction"	1:16
6.	"A New Encounter"	1:23
7.	"Aim for Nationals"	1:58
8.	"Disturbance"	0:31
9.	"Pure Thoughts"	1:21
10.	"Intense Practice"	0:35
11.	"Good Days"	2:28
12.	"To Take One Step Forward"	1:46
13.	"Small Change"	1:05
14.	"Night of the Agata Festival"	2:01
15.	"To Be Special"	2:36
16.	"Each Intention"	0:38
17.	"Laminated Thoughts"	0:30
18.	"Declaration"	1:10
19.	"Swirling Emotions"	0:32
20.	"Confession"	1:14
21.	"Firm Determination"	1:22
22.	"Those That Cannot Be Yielded"	2:09
23.	"Just the Two of Us"	1:45
24.	"Answer"	1:29
25.	"Precious Things"	1:33
26.	"The Real Performance"	2:39
27.	"And the Door Opens"	1:00
28.	"Melody to the Future"	1:36
29.	"Dream Solister (Movie Ver.)"	6:00
Total length:		46:00

== Marketing ==
The teaser key visual and trailer for Sound! Euphonium: The Movie – Welcome to the Kitauji High School Concert Band were released in December 2015. The main key visual for the film was released in February 2016. Promotional partners for the film included Keihan Electric Railway, the karaoke box chain Jumbo Karaoke Hiroba, Yukari Resort, Onkyo, the Japanese Red Cross Society through its blood center in Kyoto, and Ujitawara Tea Producing Factory.

== Release ==
=== Theatrical ===
Sound! Euphonium: The Movie – Welcome to the Kitauji High School Concert Band was released in Japan on April 23, 2016. In light of the arson attack at Kyoto Animation, Shochiku held a special screening for the films produced by the studio "to create an opportunity for people to be able to watch... works... by Kyoto Animation on the big screen"; Welcome to the Kitauji High School Concert Band was screened at Shinjuku Piccadilly Cinema in Tokyo on August 29, 2019, and at Movix in Kyoto on October 4.

=== Home media ===
Sound! Euphonium: The Movie – Welcome to the Kitauji High School Concert Band was released on Blu-ray and DVD in Japan on September 7, 2016. The film was released on Abema TV on September 24, 2017, on Hulu Japan on February 6, 2022, on DMM TV on March 15, 2023, and on Amazon Prime Video in Japan on April 22.

Eleven Arts released the film on video on demand in the United States and Canada on December 1, 2020. The film was made available for streaming on Tubi on April 8, 2021, and on Crunchyroll on December 8, 2022.

== Reception ==
Sound! Euphonium: The Movie – Welcome to the Kitauji High School Concert Band grossed ¥220 million in Japan. In its opening weekend in Japan, the film placed eleventh at the box office. Outside Japan, the film earned $36,476 in South Korea. The film was selected as a Jury Recommended Work at the Japan Media Arts Festival in 2017.
