= Liz and the Blue Bird =

- Theatrical release poster
- Directed by: Naoko Yamada
- Screenplay by: Reiko Yoshida
- Based on: Sound! Euphonium by Ayano Takeda
- Produced by: Shinichi Nakamura; Eharu Oohashi; Shigeru Saitô; Riri Senami; Yoshifumi Yarimizu
- Starring: Atsumi Tanezaki; Nao Tōyama
- Cinematography: Kazuya Takao
- Edited by: Kengo Shigemura
- Music by: Kensuke Ushio; Akito Matsuda
- Production companies: Kyoto Animation; Bandai Namco Arts; Pony Canyon; Rakuonsha; Animation DO
- Distributed by: Shochiku
- Release date: April 21, 2018
- Running time: 90 minutes
- Country: Japan
- Language: Japanese
- Box office: $737,286

Liz and the Blue Bird (Japanese: リズと青い鳥, Hepburn: Rizu to Aoi Tori) is a 2018 Japanese animated drama film directed by Naoko Yamada and written by Reiko Yoshida, based on the Sound! Euphonium novel series written by Ayano Takeda and its eponymous anime television series adaptation. Inspired in particular by the 2017 Sound! Euphonium novel Hibike! Yūfoniamu Kitauji Kōkō Suisōgaku-bu, Haran no Dainigakushō Kōhen, the film is a spin-off sequel to the television series, focusing on the friendship of Mizore Yoroizuka and Nozomi Kasaki, two supporting characters introduced during the series' second novel (adapted as part of the second season of the anime adaptation).

The film focuses on the relationship between Mizore and Nozomi as they prepare for a concert with their high school's wind band; in parallel, it also depicts a fairy tale, from which the music piece worked on by the band is adapted, as a story within a story. Atsumi Tanezaki and Nao Tōyama, among others, reprise their voice roles as characters from the television series; most of them were re-designed to better fit the film's style and story. Liz and the Blue Bird had two composers: Kensuke Ushio, who wrote the minimal-style background music for the high school scenes, and Akito Matsuda, the composer of the television series, who wrote both the background music for the fairy tale segments, and the concert pieces performed by the characters.

It was released on April 21, 2018, in Japan, and had a limited release on November 9, 2018, in the United States. It received positive reviews from critics, with most praise going to the relationship and personalities of the two main characters, soundtrack, and animation.

== Plot ==
Mizore is a quiet student in her third and final year of high school, who is an oboist in the school's concert band. Her closest friend is Nozomi, one of the band's flutists, who is much more outgoing and popular. Together, the two rehearse a duet from the musical piece Liz and the Blue Bird, which is based on a fairy tale of the same name. The story is about a young woman named Liz (represented by the oboe in the musical piece) and a blue bird turned human (represented by the flute) who become best friends and live together, until the two are forced to part ways. Nozomi and Mizore realize that the story applies closely to their own relationship and impending graduation, which worries Mizore; she sees herself as Liz and Nozomi as the fleeting blue bird.

Although Nozomi spends time with other friends from the band, Mizore refuses her other bandmates' offers to spend time together. Mizore often tries to express her affection to Nozomi, but finds herself unable to. Niiyama, the band's woodwind instructor, advises Mizore to apply to a music school after graduation so that she can become a professional musician; she is not particularly interested at first, but changes her mind after Nozomi says that she might apply to the same school. This worries their bandmates, as they realize that Mizore's only motivation for playing music is Nozomi, who is not truly serious about becoming a professional.

As the concert approaches, Mizore and Nozomi grow apart. Mizore, anxious about her future and recalling that Nozomi quit the band two years prior, is afraid that she is abandoning her again. Meanwhile, Nozomi is uncomfortable with Mizore progressively opening herself to others and being tutored by Niiyama, envious of her greater potential. Furthermore, the two have trouble perfecting their duet, both because of their increasingly strained relationship and because of their difficulty connecting with the characters from Liz and the Blue Bird; Mizore, in particular, does not understand why Liz would ever let the blue bird go free instead of keeping it with her forever.

Eventually, the two come to a greater understanding of their relationship, thanks to the assistance of Niiyama and other members of the band. They ultimately come to realize that, while they associated Mizore to Liz and Nozomi to the blue bird, Mizore is actually closer to the blue bird—having to let go of her unconditional attachment so she can live her own life—while Nozomi is closer to Liz, who let the bird go free so that she would not weigh it down. At the next rehearsal, they perform the piece perfectly. Mizore's performance moves her bandmates, and Nozomi exits the practice room in tears. Mizore confronts Nozomi privately afterwards; Nozomi accuses Mizore of holding back her talent for her sake. She also explains that she didn't intend on applying for music school, and had only said so to appear as Mizore's equal. Mizore, upset that Nozomi is seemingly ignoring her feelings and leaving her behind, hugs Nozomi and confesses the true extent of her love. Nozomi tersely responds that she loves Mizore's oboe, and thanks her.

Some time later, Mizore practices for the concert while Nozomi focuses on schoolwork. After meeting outside the school, Nozomi says that she will back up Mizore perfectly in their duet, only asking for "a little time". Mizore answers that she will continue to play the oboe. As the two walk together, Nozomi suddenly turns to Mizore, surprising her.

== Voice cast ==
- Atsumi Tanezaki (Japanese) / Laurie Hymes (English) as Mizore Yoroizuka, an introverted third-year high school student and oboist in the concert band
- Nao Tōyama (Japanese) / Stephanie Sheh (English) as Nozomi Kasaki, a third-year flutist in the band and Mizore's more outgoing friend
- Miyu Honda (Japanese) / Courtney Shaw (English) as both Liz and the Mysterious Girl, the main characters of the Liz and the Blue Bird fairy tale
- Konomi Fujimura (Japanese) / Sarah Anne Williams (English) as Natsuki Nakagawa, a third-year euphoniumist and the vice-president of the band
- Yuri Yamaoka (Japanese) / Megan Harvey (English) as Yuuko Yoshikawa, a third-year trumpeter and the president of the band
- Shiori Sugiura (Japanese) / Xanthe Huynh (English) as Ririka Kenzaki, a first-year oboist in the band
- Chika Anzai (Japanese) / Cristina Vee (English) as Reina Kousaka, a second-year trumpeter in the band
- Tomoyo Kurosawa (Japanese) / Courtney Shaw (English) as Kumiko Oumae, a second-year euphoniumist in the band
- Ayaka Asai (Japanese) / Alyson Leigh Rosenfeld (English) as Hazuki Katou, a second-year tubaist in the band
- Moe Toyota (Japanese) / Cassandra Lee Morris (English) as Sapphire Kawashima, a second-year bassist in the band
- Houko Kuwashima (Japanese) / Ryan Bartley (English) as Satomi Niiyama, the band's woodwind instructor
- Yuichi Nakamura (Japanese) / Mike Pollock (English) as Masahiro Hashimoto, the band's percussion instructor
- Takahiro Sakurai (Japanese) / Wayne Grayson (English) as Noboru Taki, the band's music director

== Production ==
=== Background ===
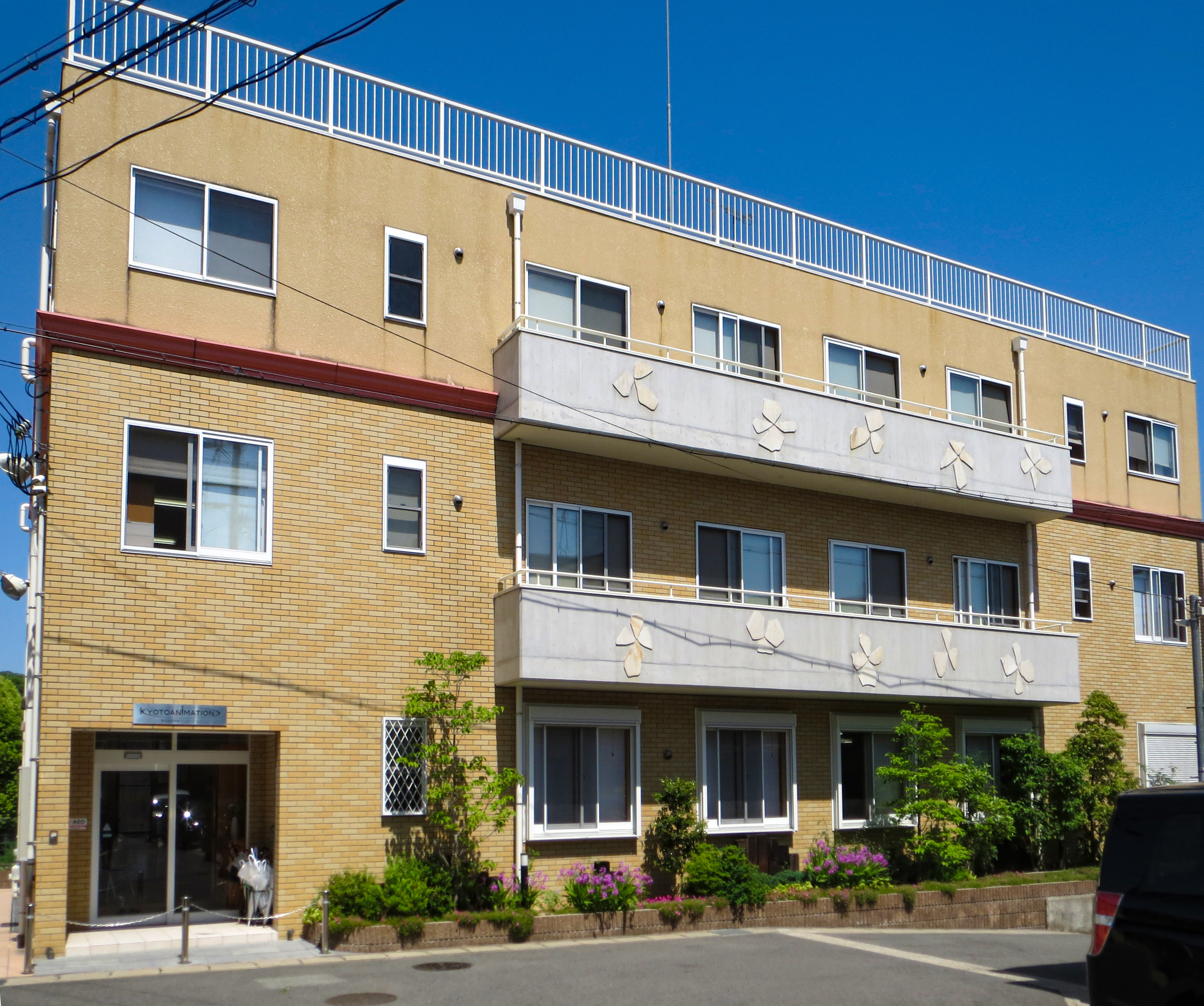
Liz and the Blue Bird was produced by Kyoto Animation (studio building pictured 2015).

Beginning in 2015, the Sound! Euphonium novels by Ayano Takeda were adapted into an animated television series by Kyoto Animation. After being offered a film adaptation of her series by Kyoto Animation, Takeda submitted the plot of what would become The Turbulent Second Movement (波乱の第二楽章) installments of her novel series to the studio. The plot featured the main character of the series, Kumiko Oumae, as well as the side characters of Nozomi and Mizore. Tatsuya Ishihara, the director of the television adaptation, originally planned to adapt Takeda's plot as a single film. However, Naoko Yamada, who worked with Ishihara as the show's series director, suggested that Nozomi and Mizore's story could stand on its own as a spin-off film. Liz and the Blue Bird emerged when Kyoto Animation decided to split the adaptation between two films; Ishihara directed the film about Kumiko, while Yamada directed the film about Nozomi and Mizore. Ishihara's film, Sound! Euphonium: The Movie – Our Promise: A Brand New Day, was released in 2019.

With the production staff from Sound! Euphonium occupied with Ishihara's film, several people who had worked under Yamada's direction for the 2016 film A Silent Voice returned to produce Liz and the Blue Bird. These included writer Reiko Yoshida, composer Kensuke Ushio, and character designer Futoshi Nishiya. Yoshida also worked as the screenwriter for several other works directed by Yamada, including K-On! and Tamako Market. The crew also included Mutsuo Shinohara as art director, and Naomi Ishida as color stylist. Stephanie Sheh served as casting director and ADR director for the film's English release.

=== Direction ===
Sound! Euphonium was a passionate work; it felt exhilarating, as if the girls were charging up a flight of stairs. But this time, by narrowing our focus to depict the struggles of two girls and nothing more, [Liz and the Blue Bird] feels like going down those stairs, down to the depths of the heart. I wanted to portray it delicately, carefully, and beautifully.

— Naoko Yamada

Yamada departed from the large scope of Sound! Euphonium's cast to "completely focus" the film on Nozomi and Mizore. Takeda's original plot positioned Kumiko as a mediator between Nozomi and Mizore; Yamada eschewed this structure in Liz and the Blue Bird to focus on Nozomi and Mizore's direct interactions. Expressing the desire to protect Nozomi and Mizore's dignity with the adaptation, Yamada stated that one of her priorities was to thoroughly depict their dynamic: in which two people motivated by "love" narrowly fail to understand each other. Although Yamada aimed to direct a faithful adaptation of Takeda's original plot, she feared that her own interpretation of the story had entered the film. Yamada described her personal desire for a happy ending coming into conflict with the original plot; she ultimately aimed to leave the impression of a happy ending while allowing for a sense of unease.

The film's central fairy tale and musical piece originated as an embedded narrative in Takeda's plot; Takeda sought to thematically represent Nozomi and Mizore's changing relationship as a song performed by their band. While Takeda's plot told the fairy tale in full before shifting to Nozomi and Mizore's perspective, the film intersperses the fairy tale throughout the main story. According to Yamaha, the interwoven structure was chosen to enhance the film's visual appeal and to further the main story's momentum.

To cohesively depict gradual developments in the story, Yamada personally drew the storyboards for the entire film. Believing that the film depicted "secret matters" between the two main characters that could only be filmed indirectly, she envisioned scenes as footage from a long-focus lens and based the overall color scheme around the "greenish tint" of glass. Throughout production, the concept of coprime numbers was used as a metaphor for Nozomi and Mizore's narrow separation. (Note: Two numbers that are coprime have no common positive divisor between them besides 1.) Yamada included the English phrase "disjoint" in the film as a translation of the word tagai ni so (互いに素; "coprime").

The character designs in Liz and the Blue Bird, provided by Futoshi Nishiya, were a visual departure from Sound Euphonium!. Nishiya and Yamada agreed on a design that was "delicate" enough to capture small shifts in affect. Yamada felt that the animation process required immense "stamina", since animators were tasked to meticulously convey subtle movements and expressions. Though she anticipated confusion surrounding the task, Yamada stated that many staff members at Kyoto Animation were familiar with depicting nuanced emotions and leveraged their experience for the film.

In an interview with Anime News Network, Yamada stated in response to the question of if she'd describe Liz and the Blue Bird as a "gay love story": "On Liz and the Blue Bird, as well as Tamako Love Story, a lot of people read into that as a gay love story, as you have mentioned. But that wasn't so much the intention. Just to explain a bit more, it wasn't so much the representation of one sexual orientation, but it was a representation of adolescence, what the characters tend to go through at that time. During those years of our lives, everything seems intensified, whether it be friendships, or the reliance on a certain person, or the dependency.... Because of the limitations of the worlds that the characters live in as well. I just wanted to describe how complex living your teenage years could be, and what they tend to go through. So it wasn't a simple depiction of, "Yes, they're gay and this is their love story", because I can't comment on what kind of person they would fall in love with in the future, or who they will become. It's a portrayal of what they were at the time. The answer is, it is quite complicated."

=== Voice acting ===
Several cast members for the Sound! Euphonium television series reprised their roles in Liz and the Blue Bird. Atsumi Tanezaki, who played Mizore, recalled that the film came as a "complete surprise" to the cast when it was announced. After receiving the script, Nozomi's voice actress Nao Tōyama struggled to reconcile her character's actions with Nozomi's depiction in the television series. Per Tōyama, Nozomi's energetic personality in Sound! Euphonium was mellowed to match the tone of Liz and the Blue Bird, and she began to be portrayed with hints of selfishness and jealousy.

On the day Tōyama and Tanezaki recorded their lines, Yamada described Liz and the Blue Bird as a standalone film that was "both Eupho (Note: Sound! Euphonium is often simply referred to as Eupho.) and not Eupho" to the two actresses and suggested a fresh approach towards their characters. Tanezaki's instructions from Yamada were the same as the ones she received for the television series: to treat every interaction with Nozomi as if it was their "last chance" to be together. Both actresses were guided by emotional descriptions in the script, as their short lines of dialogue were surrounded by pages of exposition and stage directions.

During the course of the film, Nozomi and Mizore compare themselves to characters in the fairy tale. To leave the exact correspondence between the leads and the fairy tale characters up to the audience, Yamada planned to have a single voice actor for both Liz and the blue-haired girl. The production team ultimately cast Miyu Honda for the two roles based on Yamada's suggestion. Having admired Honda's voice before her casting, Yamada felt that her voice was "distinctive" and "innocent." Though initially instructed to voice both Liz and the blue-haired girl in a similar manner, Honda distinguished between the two by assigning different personalities to each role. She concluded that Liz was a "mature older sister" who contrasted the blue-haired girl's energetic attitude, and acted accordingly during her recording session.

=== Music and sound design ===
The film's soundtrack was created through unconventional techniques, such as bowing the strings of a prepared piano.

Liz and the Blue Bird had two composers: Kensuke Ushio provided minimal-styled background music for Nozomi and Mizore's school setting, while Akito Matsuda, who had previously composed for the Sound! Euphonium television series, was responsible for the film's fairy tale scenes and orchestral theme. Saito Shigeru served as the music producer for the film and Yōta Tsuruoka was the sound director. Ushio was brought on during the earliest stages of production and developed the film's central concepts with other staff members. After Yamada developed the storyboards, Ushio worked in tandem with the animators to align the film's visuals with the soundtrack. In terms of musical meter, Yamada recalled that she unconsciously drew her storyboards in triple time, which eventually influenced Ushio's compositions.

The sound of Nozomi and Mizore's footsteps were integrated into the film's beginning and ending tracks, titled "wind,glass,bluebird" and "wind,glass,girls" respectively. The struggle of syncing the sound of each footstep with Yamada's storyboards prompted Yamada and Ushio to change their approach for the opening and closing scenes. Instead of constraining the sound design around the storyboards, Yamada determined the tempo of the footsteps with Ushio first and drew the storyboards accordingly. In the film's opening scene, Mizore and Nozomi walked at 60 and 110 beats per minute, respectively. In the final scene, the rhythm of their footsteps was adjusted to the coprime numbers of 100 for Mizore and 99 to 101 for Nozomi. After receiving Ushio's finalized music, Yamada found that Nozomi and Mizore's footsteps converged the moment the two characters spoke the same line in the final scene. Ushio felt that the convergence came about "miraculously", as he had not intended to put the footsteps in sync.

Ushio's soundtrack was largely atmospheric and featured field recordings from the school that inspired the film's setting. While reviewing Yamada's storyboards and her photos from location scouting, Ushio noted the presence of objects that seemed to be "watching over" the main characters. Sounds were produced from the objects in various ways and used as samples for the soundtrack; in one instance, the production team recorded a beaker being scraped by a violin bow. Ushio also used a prepared piano to produce a nostalgic impression and invoke the "prepared" environment of a school. Citing specific techniques for the prepared piano, Ushio mentioned placing solid objects between the piano's strings to change its timbre and playing the strings directly with a bow. Fearing that the film would sound like a "horror movie" if the tracks were too loud, Ushio encouraged the sound director to lower the volume of his music during production. Ushio explained that his "unconventional" approach was partly done to focus the audience's attention on Matsuda's orchestral theme. Yamada expressed fondness for "doublelead,girls", Ushio's track for the double reed-playing characters, and included it six times in the film.

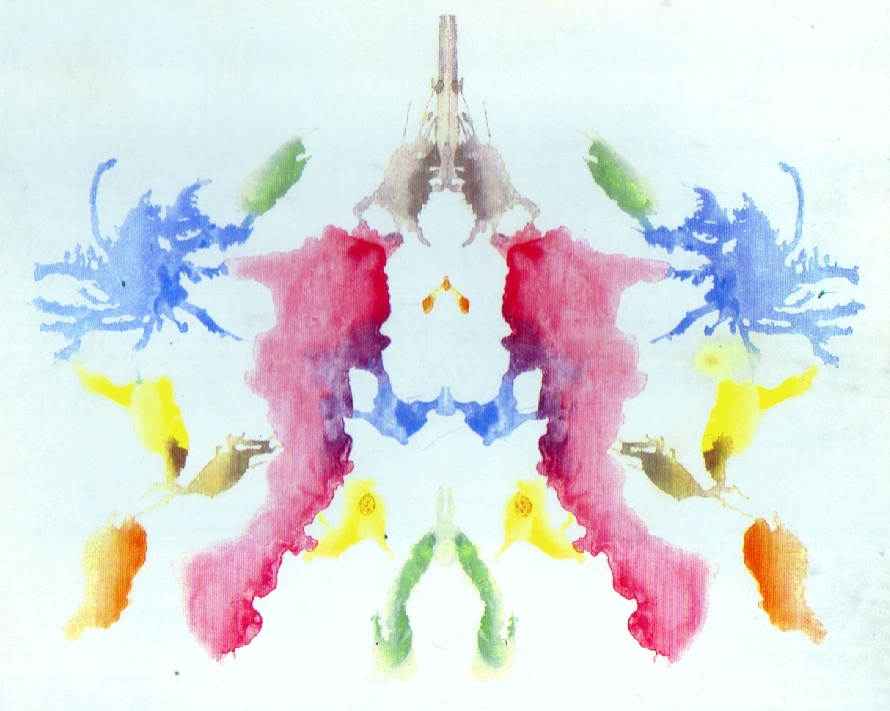
Kensuke Ushio compared the artistic basis of the film's score to the production of ink blots for the Rorschach test.

Yamada introduced the artistic technique of decalcomania to Ushio as a central concept for the film. Ushio saw the process as analagous to how ink blots were produced for a Rorschach test; he integrated the strategy into his composition by spilling ink on manuscript paper and folding it in half. The visual patterns that emerged were then interpreted as graphic score. Ushio felt that the technique reflected Nozomi and Mizore's "disjoint and gradual separation" by producing imperfect, near-symmetrical images.

Music students from Senzoku Gakuen, supervised by Masahiro Owara, performed the orchestral theme for the film's soundtrack. The theme, also titled "Liz and the Blue Bird", played a central role in a later Sound! Euphonium film, which depicted its performance in a fictionalized All-Japan Band Competition. Yamada attended recording sessions with the band and explained Nozomi and Mizore's personalities to the flute and oboe players; the sessions were also filmed for animation reference.

The band Homecomings provided the theme song for the film, "Songbirds", which was used as the second song for the end credits. Homecomings planned to write the lyrics for "Songbirds" in Japanese, but ultimately wrote them in English at Yamada's request. Yuki Fukutomi, the band's guitarist, was inspired by Bandwagonesque by Teenage Fanclub while writing the lyrics to "Songbirds". The end credits also feature another song titled "girls,dance,staircase", composed by Ushio with lyrics by Yamada. Ushio and Yamada planned to imbue the song with "the sacred", which was another working concept for the film. At Yamada's suggestion, the song was sung by a boy soprano to give the impression of religious music.

== Release ==
The film was released in Japan on April 21, 2018, by Shochiku. Eleven Arts released the film the United States on November 9, 2018. It premiered in Canada on January 2, 2019.

The film was later released on Blu-ray and DVD on December 5, 2018, in Japan. Eleven Arts later announced Shout! Factory, who is best known for releasing Super Sentai media in North America would be releasing Liz and the Blue Bird on home video in the region on March 5, 2019.

On November 14, 2024, it was announced that GKIDS picked up the distribution rights to the film.

== Reception ==
=== Critical reception ===
Liz and the Blue Bird received positive reviews from critics, with most praise going to the relationship and personalities of the two main characters, soundtrack, and animation. Review aggregator website Rotten Tomatoes gives the film an 83% approval rating based on 12 reviews, with an average rating of 7.4/10. On Metacritic, which assigns a weighted average rating, the film has a score of 67 out of 100 based on 5 critics, indicating "generally favorable reviews". Reviewers stated that the film was a standalone story that did not require knowledge of Sound! Euphonium.

Natasha H. of IGN gave a highly positive review, stating: that Yamada goes "full out with her own style and approach to constructing an experience of loneliness, misperceptions of people, and overcoming unrealistic dreams. She does this in one of the most unique and extraordinary methods I've seen in this medium: by pairing her framing and pacing of the story right up with the soundtrack. It is almost impossible to decouple the visual and auditory experiences of Liz and the Blue Bird ... The soft character designs also lend to emotional expressions, which aligns perfectly with the kind of people Mizore and Nozomi are. Whether it's the eyes, or slant of the mouth, or even the criss crossing of legs – the attention to detail shows in every frame of the film. The music is also very particular, as Ushio weaves instruments familiar and strange together into a sparse and discreet score to portray the mindset of the main two characters and atmosphere of each scene in the film." She gave the film a 9 out of 10 rating, concluding: "Liz and the Blue Bird, while seemingly straightforward and simple, is one of the most structurally complex films about the necessity of communication for healthy relationships. It displays human insecurity and vulnerability in beautifully honest ways, and thanks to the combined craft of director Yamada's impeccable vision and composer Ushio's sparse but minimalistic soundtrack, it ends up becoming one of the most touching and moving experiences I've seen this year."

Matt Schley of The Japan Times gave the film a 4.5 out of 5 rating, calling it "brilliantly executed" and stating "Not everyone has been in a wind band, but there are few among us who have never had to say goodbye to a friend. For Sound! Euphonium fans, Liz will be a welcome trip back into its world, but this film will resonate just as strongly with anyone who's ever been through the emotional roller coaster known as high school." Writing for The Daily Dot, Michelle Jarowski gave the film a 4 out of 5 rating, stating "Liz and the Blue Bird soars from the get-go as it weaves together a fantastical fairy tale and a more intimate, relatable high school story. As two sides of the same coin, both stories circle one another until they fuse into a poignant harmony of sight and sound."

Jordan Mintzer of The Hollywood Reporter gave a moderately positive review, unfavourably comparing the film to Yamada's previous work A Silent Voice. He stated: "Despite the way Yamada keeps reiterating how delicate teenage relationships can be, and how easily they can slip away when you move on to the next stage of your life, the story's limited setting and lack of overt drama makes her movie feel somewhat uneventful. It seems closer, at times, to an after-school special – or to an episode of Degrassi Junior High – than to a full-fledged feature, even if a late twist gives everything more gravitas. Aesthetically speaking, there are nonetheless some beautiful moments scattered throughout the story, with the animation switching seamlessly between the detailed manga-style drawings of the classroom scenes and the more ephemeral watercolor renderings of the fairy tale sequences. Like in A Silent Voice, Yamada has a very keen eye for depicting adolescent malaise in visually evocative terms, and Liz and the Blue Bird could have benefited from even more flights of fancy than she allows for here."

=== Box office ===
Liz and the Blue Bird grossed $737,286 at the box office.

=== Accolades ===
The film won the Ofuji Noburo Award. It was also nominated for the Animat's Award for Best Feature-Length Film at the Sitges Film Festival in Spain; in America, it was nominated for a Satellite Award for Best Animated or Mixed Media Feature.

== Follow-up film ==
Another Sound! Euphonium film titled Sound! Euphonium: The Movie – Our Promise: A Brand New Day was released on April 19, 2019; it is directed by Tatsuya Ishihara and written by Jukki Hanada, respectively the television series' main director and sole writer. Its production took place concurrently with Liz and the Blue Bird's; it focuses on Kumiko, the main character of the novels who appears in Liz in a supporting role, and is "connected" to Liz. Yamada stated that the "Liz and the Blue Bird" music piece featured in her film "will be connecting the film to [the second one]." The film was released in North America on July 11, 2019 (sub) and July 15, 2019 (dub).
