= Shoko Ikeda =

Japanese animator (1975–2019)

- 池田 晶子
- Born: 18 June 1975
- Died: 18 July 2019 (aged 44); Fushimi-ku, Kyoto, Japan
- Education: Yoyogi Animation Academy
- Occupations: Animator; character designer
- Years active: 1996–2019
- Employer: Kyoto Animation
- Notable work: The Melancholy of Haruhi Suzumiya; Sound! Euphonium
- Spouse: Yuzuru Terawaki (m. 2007)

Shōko Terawaki (Japanese: 寺脇 晶子, Hepburn: Terawaki Shōko; 18 June 1975 – 18 July 2019), known professionally as Shoko Ikeda (池田 晶子, Ikeda Shōko), was a Japanese animator and character designer who worked at Kyoto Animation. She worked as character designer and chief animation director for The Melancholy of Haruhi Suzumiya (2006) and the Sound! Euphonium franchise, and after her death in the Kyoto Animation arson attack, she was posthumously credited for her work on the 2023 OVA Sound! Euphonium: Ensemble Contest and the anime's 2024 third season.

== Career ==
Shoko Ikeda, a native of Kyoto Prefecture, was born on 18 June 1975. Inspired by the anime OVA Gunbuster to pursue a career as an animator, she was educated at the Yoyogi Animation Academy Osaka campus' Department of Animation, and she joined Kyoto Animation in 1996. During her early years in Kyoto Animation, she worked as an animation director for Inuyasha, for which the studio was a coloring subcontractor, during which she encouraged employees at the studio to "make works of higher quality than any other company". Additionally, her original drawings were featured prominently in the special feature pages of anime magazines.

In 2006, Ikeda was the character designer and chief animation director for The Melancholy of Haruhi Suzumiya. Director Yutaka Yamamoto later recalled that "Haruhi [Suzumiya] was perfectly equal to [Ikeda]," who also admitted that she herself thought Haruhi was "just like me". At Anime Expo 2008, she won the Society for the Promotion of Japanese Animation Award for Best Character Design for her work on the anime. She also worked as an animation director for Kanon, Lucky Star and K-On!, among others.

In December 2014, Ikeda was announced as the character designer for the Sound! Euphonium anime. She returned as character designer for the anime's second season, as well as the films Sound! Euphonium: The Movie – Welcome to the Kitauji High School Concert Band, Sound! Euphonium: The Movie – May the Melody Reach You! and Sound! Euphonium: The Movie – Our Promise: A Brand New Day.

At Kyoto Animation, she continued to improve skills by sketching fashion magazine models and, secretly, other colleagues' work, as well as using another colleague as a model. She supported reforms to address widespread poverty among young animators.

== Personal life ==
She was a fan of the Takarazuka Revue's productions of the musical Elisabeth, at one point doing a parody at Kyoto Animation's end-of-year party.

She married university employee Yuzuru Terawaki (寺脇 譲, Terawaki Yuzuru) in 2007; she illustrated a commemorative picture for her own wedding. They had two children, the eldest of whom was an elementary school student at the time of his mother's death. In 2021, her husband recalled that she "was innocent and really loved anime". She cooked gratin dishes at home.

At the time of her death, she lived in Uji, a city south of Kyoto.

== Death ==
Ikeda was killed in the Kyoto Animation arson attack on 18 July 2019; her body was found on the second floor. She was 44 years old. She was posthumously credited as character designer for the 2023 theatrical OVA Sound! Euphonium: Ensemble Contest and, alongside Kazumi Ikeda, for the 2024 third season of Sound! Euphonium.

== Filmography ==
=== Television series ===
| Year | Title | Character designer | Chief animation director | Animation director | Animator | Ref. |
|---|---|---|---|---|---|---|
| 2005 | Air | No | No | Yes | Yes | |
| 2006 | Kanon (Kyoto Animation) | No | No | Yes | Yes | |
| 2006–2009 | The Melancholy of Haruhi Suzumiya | Yes | Yes | Yes | No | |
| 2007 | Lucky Star | No | No | Yes | Yes | |
| 2007 | Clannad | No | No | Yes | Yes | |
| 2008 | Clannad: After Story | No | No | Yes | No | |
| 2009–2010 | K-On! | No | No | Season 2 | Yes | |
| 2011 | Nichijou | No | No | Yes | Yes | |
| 2012 | Hyouka | No | No | No | Yes | |
| 2012–2014 | Love, Chunibyo & Other Delusions! | No | No | Season 2 | Yes | |
| 2013 | Tamako Market | No | No | Yes | Yes | |
| 2015–2024 | Sound! Euphonium | Yes (posthumous in season 3) | Seasons 1-2 | Season 1 | Season 2 | |
| 2017 | Miss Kobayashi's Dragon Maid | No | No | Yes | No | |
| 2018 | Violet Evergarden | No | No | Yes | No | |

=== Films ===
| Year | Title | Character designer | Chief animation director | Animation director | Animator | Ref. |
|---|---|---|---|---|---|---|
| 2010 | The Disappearance of Haruhi Suzumiya | Yes | Ultra chief | Yes | Yes | |
| 2013 | Love, Chunibyo & Other Delusions!: Rikka Version | No | No | No | Yes | |
| 2014 | Tamako Love Story | No | No | No | Yes | |
| 2016 | Sound! Euphonium: The Movie – Welcome to the Kitauji High School Concert Band | Yes | No | No | No | |
| 2017 | Sound! Euphonium: The Movie – May the Melody Reach You! | Yes | Yes | Yes | No | |
| 2018 | Love, Chunibyo & Other Delusions! Take on Me | No | No | Yes | No | |
| 2019 | Sound! Euphonium: The Movie – Our Promise: A Brand New Day | Yes | Yes | No | No | |
| 2019 | Violet Evergarden: Eternity and the Auto Memory Doll (posthumous) | No | No | Yes | No | |
| 2020 | Violet Evergarden: The Movie (posthumous) | No | No | No | Yes | |
| 2023 | Sound! Euphonium: Ensemble Contest (posthumous) | Yes | No | No | No | |
| 2026 | Sound! Euphonium: The Final Movie (posthumous) | Yes | No | No | No | |
