= Tomoyo Kurosawa =

Japanese voice actress

- 黒沢 ともよ
- Born: April 10, 1996 (age 30); Chichibu, Saitama, Japan
- Education: Hosei University
- Occupations: Actress; voice actress; singer
- Years active: 2000–present
- Agent: Toho Geino
- Notable work: The Idolmaster Cinderella Girls as Miria Akagi; Aikatsu! as Otome Arisugawa; Yuki Yuna Is a Hero as Itsuki Inubozaki; Sound! Euphonium as Kumiko Ōmae; Land of the Lustrous as Phosphophyllite; Astra Lost in Space as Quitterie Raffaëlli; Fire Emblem: Three Houses as Sothis; Arknights as Amiya; Wandering Witch: The Journey of Elaina as Saya; Akudama Drive as Ordinary Person / Swindler; Girls' Frontline as P7
- Spouse: Undisclosed (m. 2023)
- Children: 1

Tomoyo Kurosawa (黒沢 ともよ, Kurosawa Tomoyo; born April 10, 1996) is a Japanese actress and singer. Her major voice acting roles include Yuki Yuna Is a Hero as Itsuki Inubozaki, Arknights as Amiya, Sound! Euphonium as Kumiko Ōmae, Otome Arisugawa in Aikatsu!, Rebecca in Cyberpunk: Edgerunners, Annabella in Tower of Fantasy, Miria Akagi in The Idolmaster Cinderella Girls, and Land of the Lustrous as Phosphophyllite. She also performed the opening theme to DokiDoki! PreCure, "Happy Go Lucky! Doki Doki! Pretty Cure".

== Biography ==
Kurosawa began studying acting at the age of 3. In 2000, she began appearing in TV dramas, commercials and stage performances. When she was in high school, she joined the light music club where she learned to play guitar.

Kurosawa became a support member of Sound Horizon in 2008, appearing in their sixth CD story "Moira" that same year, and in Sound Horizon's seventh CD story "Märchen", released in 2010. She made her voice acting debut as Natsuki Koyama in the 2010 anime film Welcome to the Space Show. In 2012, she moved from Space Craft to Mausu Promotion.

Kurosawa enrolled at Hosei University in 2015. She announced her graduation in 2019. In August 2020, Kurosawa moved again from Mausu Production to Toho Geino.

On October 9, 2020, it was announced that Kurosawa had tested positive for COVID-19. She was discharged on October 19.

On June 8, 2023, Kurosawa announced through her agency and Twitter account that she had gotten married.

On May 1, 2026, Kurosawa announced the birth of her first child.

== Filmography ==
=== Film ===
- Godzilla Minus Zero (2026)

=== Television drama ===
- Aoi Tokugawa Sandai (2000) – Ichihime
- Say Hello to Black Jack (2003) – Yumi
- Attention Please (2006) – Yoko Misaki (childhood)
- Examination of God (2007)
- Sesame Street (2007) – Junko
- Maybe Koi ga Kikoeru (2023) – Utako Tsunoda

=== Television animation ===
2012

- Aikatsu! – Otome Arisugawa
- Black Rock Shooter – female student B, girls A, basketball staff, girls C, Manager, classmate B

2014

- Amagi Brilliant Park – Sylphy
- Black Bullet – Tina Sprout
- Locodol – Tsubasa Tsurugi
- Yuki Yuna Is a Hero – Itsuki Inubozaki

2015

- The Idolmaster Cinderella Girls – Miria Akagi
- Seraph of the End – Mirai Kimizuki
- Sound! Euphonium – Kumiko Ōmae

2016

- Active Raid – Liko
- Ragnastrike Angels – Ayano Anemori
- Sound! Euphonium 2 – Kumiko Ōmae
- Tsukiuta. The Animation – Reina Ichisaki

2017

- Idol Time PriPara – Garara•S•Leep
- Land of the Lustrous – Phosphophyllite
- Love and Lies – Kagetsu Ichijō
- Sakura Quest – Erika Suzuki
- Yuki Yuna Is a Hero: Hero Chapter – Itsuki Inubozaki

2018

- BanG Dream! Girls Band Party! Pico – Misaki Okusawa/Michelle
- Cutie Honey Universe – Flash Honey
- Dragon Pilot: Hisone and Masotan – Nao Kaizaki
- FLCL Progressive – Aiko
- Mr. Tonegawa: Middle Management Blues – Zawa Voice (006)
- Karakuri Circus – Talanda "Lise" Liselotte Tachibana
- The Girl in Twilight – Asuka Tsuchimiya

2019

- Afterlost – Ryōko
- Astra Lost in Space – Quitterie Raffaëlli
- BanG Dream! 2nd Season – Misaki Okusawa/Michelle
- O Maidens in Your Savage Season – Hitoha Hongō

2020

- Akudama Drive – Ordinary Person / Swindler
- BanG Dream! 3rd Season – Misaki Okusawa/Michelle
- BanG Dream! Girls Band Party! Pico: Ohmori – Misaki Okusawa/Michelle
- Jujutsu Kaisen – Nobuko Takada / Takada-chan
- Listeners – Zende Neubauten
- Rail Romanesque – Kurenai
- Uchitama?! Have you seen my Tama? – Koma Oketani
- Wandering Witch: The Journey of Elaina – Saya

2021

- BanG Dream! Girls Band Party! Pico Fever! – Misaki Okusawa/Michelle
- Farewell, My Dear Cramer – Sumire Suō
- Laid-Back Camp: Season 2 – Ayano Toki
- Megaton Musashi – Asuna Kanzaki
- One Piece – Ulti
- Record of Ragnarok – Göll
- Yuki Yuna Is a Hero: The Great Mankai Chapter – Itsuki Inubozaki

2022

- Akiba Maid War – Shiipon
- Arknights: Prelude to Dawn – Amiya
- Cyberpunk: Edgerunners – Rebecca
- Girls' Frontline – P7
- Prima Doll – Haikagura

2023

- Heavenly Delusion – Kuku
- Magical Destroyers – Pink
- Record of Ragnarok II – Göll
- Skip and Loafer – Mitsumi Iwakura
- Jujutsu Kaisen Season 2 – Nobuko Takada / Takada-chan(ep 20)
- The Idolmaster Cinderella Girls U149 – Miria Akagi
- Undead Girl Murder Farce – Aya Rindo
- Yohane the Parhelion: Sunshine in the Mirror – Tsuki

2024

- Frieren: Beyond Journey's End – Edel
- Go! Go! Loser Ranger! – Renren Akebayashi
- Laid-Back Camp: Season 3 – Ayano Toki
- Meiji Gekken: 1874 – Sumie Kanomata/Hinazuru
- Metallic Rouge – Naomi Orthmann
- Sound! Euphonium 3 – Kumiko Ōmae
- Sengoku Youko – Shakugan

2025

- From Bureaucrat to Villainess: Dad's Been Reincarnated! – Hinako Tondabayashi
- Mobile Suit Gundam GQuuuuuuX – Amate Yuzuriha
- Clevatess – Naie
- Hell Teacher: Jigoku Sensei Nube – Miki Hosokawa
- Digimon Beatbreak – Reina Sakuya

2026

- From Far Away – Noriko Tachiki

=== Original net animation (ONA) ===
- Time Patrol Bon – Yumiko Yasukawa

=== Feature animation ===
- Fudeko Sono Ai: Tenshi no Piano (2007) – Sachiko Ishii
- Welcome to the Space Show (2010) – Natsuki Koyama
- Jewelpet the Movie: Sweets Dance Princess (2012) – Princess Mana
- Majocco Shimai no Yoyo to Nene (2013)
- Aikatsu! (2014) – Otome Arisugawa
- Aikatsu!: The Targeted Magical Aikatsu! Card (2016) – Otome Arisugawa
- Pop In Q (2016) – Saki Tsukui
- Sound! Euphonium: The Movie – Welcome to the Kitauji High School Concert Band (2016) – Kumiko Oumae
- Sound! Euphonium: The Movie – May the Melody Reach You! (2017) – Kumiko Oumae
- Liz and the Blue Bird (2018) – Kumiko Oumae
- Love Live! Sunshine!! The School Idol Movie: Over the Rainbow (2019) – Tsuki Watanabe
- BanG Dream! Film Live (2019) – Misaki Okusawa/Michelle
- Sound! Euphonium: The Movie – Our Promise: A Brand New Day (2019) – Kumiko Oumae
- My Hero Academia: Heroes Rising (2019) – Mahoro Shimano
- Crayon Shin-chan: Crash! Rakuga Kingdom and Almost Four Heroes (2020) – Yūma
- BanG Dream! Film Live 2nd Stage (2021) – Misaki Okusawa/Michelle
- Laid-Back Camp Movie (2022) – Ayano Toki
- Mononoke the Movie: Phantom in the Rain (2024) – Asa
- Zegapain STA (2024) – Milch
- Paris ni Saku Étoile (2026)
- Unanswered//butterfly: Sword Art Online (2026) – Emirun
- Doraemon: Nobita's Steam-Powered Time Machine (2027) – Tim

=== Video games ===
2012

- Aikatsu! Cinderella Lesson as Otome Arisugawa

2013

- Aikatsu! Futari no My Princess as Otome Arisugawa
- The Idolmaster Cinderella Girls as Miria Akagi

2014

- Rage of Bahamut as Mito
- Bladedance of Elementalers DayDreamDuel as Lulu
- Nekomimi Survivor! as Hakase
- 82H Blossom as Yuzuki Negishi

2015

- Valkyrie Drive: Siren as Kotona Misaki
- Nights of Azure as Christophorus

2016

- Band Yarouze! as Miley
- Tales of Berseria as Kamoana (Moana)
- Final Fantasy XV as Talcott Hester
- Girls' Frontline as P7

2017

- BanG Dream! Girls Band Party! as Misaki Okusawa/Michelle
- Yuki Yuna Is a Hero: Hanayui no Kirameki as Itsuki Inubozaki
- Nights of Azure 2: Bride of the New Moon as Christophorus
- Idol Time PriPara as Garara・S・Leep
- Shin Megami Tensei: Strange Journey Redux as Chen
- Grand Chase Dimensional Chaser Global as Arme Glenstid
- Azur Lane as South Dakota
- Azur Lane as Mutsu

2018

- Closers Online as Luna Aegis

2019

- Our World is Ended as Girl A
- AI: The Somnium Files as Mizuki
- Sid Story – Fenrir, Nicolini, Jefferson
- Arknights as Amiya
- Fire Emblem: Three Houses as Sothis
- Fire Emblem Heroes as Sothis

2020

- Super Smash Bros. Ultimate as Sothis
- Granblue Fantasy as Meg
- Final Fantasy Brave Exvius as Physalis
- Dragalia Lost as Lapis
- Digimon New Century as Youko Aragaki

2021

- World Witches United Front as Nishizawa Yoshiko
- Rune Factory 5 as Beatrice
- The Caligula Effect 2 as Pandora
- Cookie Run: Kingdom as Mango Cookie
- AI: The Somnium Files – nirvanA Initiative (2022) – Mizuki

2022

- Soul Hackers 2 as Ringo

2023

- Tower of Fantasy as Annabella

2025

- Riichi City as Shiroko & Kuroko
- The Hundred Line: Last Defense Academy as Nozomi Kirifuji, Karua Kashimiya

2027

- Honkai: Nexus Anima as Bai Mei

=== Dubbing ===
- Raya and the Last Dragon (2021) – Young Namaari
