= Chika Anzai =

Japanese voice actress (born 1990)

- 安済 知佳
- Born: December 22, 1990 (age 35); Fukui Prefecture, Japan
- Occupation: Voice actress
- Years active: 2009–present
- Agent: Avex
- Notable work: Scum's Wish as Hanabi Yasuraoka; Chaika: The Coffin Princess as Chaika Trabant; Sound! Euphonium and Liz and the Blue Bird as Reina Kousaka; Grand Blue as Chisa Kotegawa; O Maidens in Your Savage Season as Niina Sugawara; Sakura Quest as Maki Midorikawa; Lycoris Recoil as Chisato Nishikigi; Train to the End of the World as Shizuru Chikura; Too Many Losing Heroines! as Shikiya Yumeko
- Height: 164 cm (5 ft 5 in)
- Relatives: Junya Enoki (cousin)

Chika Anzai (安済 知佳, Anzai Chika; born December 22, 1990) is a Japanese voice actress.

== Biography and career ==
Anzai was born in Fukui Prefecture on December 22, 1990. She first learned about the voice acting industry in the 5th grade. At the age of 15, she joined the Avex Artist Academy. While she originally commuted between Fukui and Tokyo, the tremendous cost of transportation encouraged her to move to the capital. She lived there on her own, returning to her home in Fukui once per month to attend high school.

At the age of 19, she made her debut as the lead role of the anime television series Anyamaru Tantei Kiruminzuu, Nagisa Mikogami.

On August 1, 2020, Anzai announced that she had recently gotten married. In 2023, she was a recipient of the Best Lead Actor Award at the 17th Seiyu Awards.

== Filmography ==
=== Anime series ===
2009

- Anyamaru Tantei Kiruminzuu – Nagisa Mikogami

2010

- Seitokai Yakuindomo – Nanako Umibe

2011

- Chihayafuru – Yuu, Taichi's girlfriend, etc
- Un-Go – Sumika Nakahashi

2012

- Danball Senki W – Jasmine
- Hunter × Hunter (2011) – List, Kurt, Mosquito
- Soreike! Anpanman – Castanet-kun

2013

- Attack on Titan – Mina Carolina
- Chihayafuru 2 – Shiori Miyazaki, Fuyumasa Tsukuba, etc
- Danball Senki Wars – Sakuya Hosono
- Gatchaman Crowds – Yumi Hosaka
- Valvrave the Liberator – Midori Akashi

2014

- Chaika – The Coffin Princess – Chaika Trabant
- Gundam Build Fighters Try – Meguta Yasu
- Nobunaga the Fool – Kagome
- Pokémon: XY – Rena
- Riddle Story of Devil – Suzu Shutō
- Seitokai Yakuindomo* – Nanako Umibe
- Tribe Cool Crew – Yuji Shinsido

2015

- Anti-Magic Academy: The 35th Test Platoon – Kiseki Kusanagi
- Attack on Titan: Junior High – Mina Carolina
- Chaos Dragon – Inori
- Sky Wizards Academy – Amy
- Sound! Euphonium – Reina Kōsaka
- The Testament of Sister New Devil Burst – Fio

2016

- Girlish Number – Kawahara
- Grimgar of Fantasy and Ash – Mary
- Qualidea Code – Asuha Chigusa
- Schwarzesmarken – Anett Hosenfeld
- Sound! Euphonium 2 – Reina Kōsaka
- Taboo Tattoo – Tōko Ichinose

2017

- Chronos Ruler – Koyuki
- Evil or Live – Shiori
- Gintama. – Kamui (Child)
- Idol Incidents – Isuzu Narukami
- Puzzle & Dragons X – Ana
- Sakura Quest – Maki Midorikawa
- Scum's Wish – Hanabi Yasuraoka
- Wake Up, Girls! New Chapter – Aya Mizuta

2018

- Boruto: Naruto Next Generations – Ashina
- Double Decker! Doug & Kirill – Katherine "K" Roshfall
- Grand Blue – Chisa Kotegawa
- Hakumei and Mikochi – Sen
- Kokkoku: Moment by Moment – Juri Yukawa
- Record of Grancrest War – Laura Hardley
- Rokuhōdō Yotsuiro Biyori – Gin Yanokura (episode 7)
- Seven Senses of the Re'Union – Elicia
- Takunomi – Nao Kiriyama

2019

- Kandagawa Jet Girls – Manatsu Shiraishi
- My Roommate Is a Cat – Nana Ōkami
- O Maidens in Your Savage Season – Niina Sugawara

2020

- Toilet-Bound Hanako-kun – Sakura Nanamine

2021

- High-Rise Invasion – Ein
- SSSS.Dynazenon – Chise Asukagawa
- Taisho Otome Fairy Tale – Ryō Atsumi
- The Night Beyond the Tricornered Window – Erika Hiura
- The Promised Neverland Season 2 – Barbara

2022

- Lycoris Recoil – Chisato Nishikigi

2023

- Ao no Orchestra – Mizuki Machii
- TenPuru – Nyagosuke
- The Idolmaster Million Live! – Misaki Aoba
- Under Ninja – Kawado

2024

- Delico's Nursery – Theodore Classico
- Jellyfish Can't Swim in the Night – Mion
- Magilumiere Magical Girls Inc. – Mei Tsuchiba
- Mayonaka Punch – Kikka
- Suicide Squad Isekai – Katana
- The Fable – Hinako Saba
- Too Many Losing Heroines! – Yumeko Shikiya
- Train to the End of the World – Shizuru Chikura
- Tying the Knot with an Amagami Sister – Shirahi Tsuruyama
- Whisper Me a Love Song – Hajime Amasawa

2025

- Blue Miburo – Nagi
- Chitose Is in the Ramune Bottle – Asuka Nishino
- Gnosia – Yūri
- Miru: Paths to My Future – Ame
- The Shiunji Family Children – Banri Shiunji
- Welcome to the Outcast's Restaurant! – Katie

2026

- Suikoden: The Anime – Jillia Blight
- The Duke's Son Claims He Won't Love Me yet Showers Me with Adoration – Serafina Parnila
- Victoria of Many Faces – Victoria

2027

- Just Like Mona Lisa – Hinase Arima

=== Anime films ===
- Expelled from Paradise (2014) – Arhan
- Sound! Euphonium: The Movie – Welcome to the Kitauji High School Concert Band (2016) – Reina Kōsaka
- Sound! Euphonium: The Movie – May the Melody Reach You! (2017) – Reina Kōsaka
- Girls und Panzer das Finale (2017) – Oshida
- Liz and the Blue Bird (2018) – Reina Kōsaka
- Sound! Euphonium: The Movie – Our Promise: A Brand New Day (2019) – Reina Kōsaka
- Gridman Universe (2023) – Chise Asukagawa
- Grotesqqque (2026) – Sword

=== Original net animation (ONA) ===
- Junji Ito Maniac: Japanese Tales of the Macabre (2023) – Aya Kuramoto
- Gundam Build Metaverse (2023) – Rio Hōjō

=== Original video animation (OVA) ===
- Seitokai Yakuindomo (2012) – Nanako Umibe
- Who's the Winner? (Surprise Test) (2014) – Suzu Shutō
- Magical Suite Prism Nana (2015) – Mako Hiragi
- Escha Chron (2017) – Escha
- Fragtime (2019) – Yukari Kobayashi

=== Video games ===
2016

- Alternative Girls – Machi Tendo

2017

- The Idolmaster Million Live!: Theater Days – Misaki Aoba

2018

- Alice Gear Aegis – Kaede Agatsuma, Asuka Fumishima
- Granblue Fantasy – Shitori
- Shin Megami Tensei: Liberation Dx2 – Shiori Koden

2019

- Astral Chain – Protagonist (Female), Akira Howard (Female)

2020

- Kandagawa Jet Girls – Manatsu Shiraishi
- Girls' Frontline – PM-06, SAR-21

2021

- Azur Lane – Chise Asukagawa

2022

- Witch on the Holy Night – Kojika Kumari
- Arknights – Позёмка (Pozëmka)

2023

- Punishing: Gray Raven – Alisa (Echo)
- Magia Record – Olga (Arc 2.5) and Chisato Nishigiki (Agent Magica ~ Magireco x Lycoreco ~ event)

2024

- Wuthering Waves – Jianxin

2025

- Fatal Fury: City of the Wolves – Preecha
- Trails in the Sky 1st Chapter – Scherazard Harvey

2026

- Ace Combat 8: Wings of Theve – Anastasia "Tasha" Severskaya

=== Dubbing ===
==== Live-action ====
- 47 Meters Down: Uncaged – Sasha (Corinne Foxx)
- Masters of the Universe – Teela (Camila Mendes)
- Pretty Little Liars: Original Sin – Tabby Haworthe (Chandler Kinney)

==== Animation ====
- My Little Pony: Tomodachi wa Mahou – Tree Hugger
- Surf's Up 2: WaveMania – Paige
