= Sound! Euphonium =

Japanese media franchise

- Cover of the first novel

響け! ユーフォニアム (Hibike! Yūfoniamu)
- Genre: Musical; Slice of life
- Novel series
- Written by: Ayano Takeda
- Illustrated by: Nikki Asada
- Published by: Takarajimasha
- English publisher: NA: Yen Press
- Imprint: Takarajimasha Bunko
- Original run: December 5, 2013 – June 27, 2024
- Volumes: 14
- Manga

Hibike! Euphonium: Kitauji Koukou Suisougaku-bu e Youkoso
- Written by: Ayano Takeda
- Illustrated by: Hami
- Published by: Takarajimasha
- Magazine: Kono Manga ga Sugoi! Web
- Original run: November 28, 2014 – October 30, 2015
- Volumes: 3
- Anime television series
- Directed by: Tatsuya Ishihara; Naoko Yamada (Note: Yamada is credited as シリーズ演出 (series unit director), a role that works under the lead director (Ishihara) but has equivalent responsibilities.); (S1–2)
- Produced by: Shinichi Nakamura; Eharu Oohashi; Shigeru Saitou; Riri Senami (S2)
- Written by: Jukki Hanada
- Music by: Akito Matsuda
- Studio: Kyoto Animation
- Licensed by: Crunchyroll; NA: Ponycan USA (former); UK: Anime Limited (former)
- Original network: Tokyo MX, TV Aichi, KBS, BS11, AT-X, SUN, tvk, ABC (S1–2); NHK E (S3)
- Original run: April 8, 2015 – June 30, 2024
- Episodes: 39 + OVA
- Manga

Hibike! Euphonium: Kitauji Koukou Suisougaku-bu no Ichiban Atsui Natsu
- Written by: Ayano Takeda
- Illustrated by: Hami
- Published by: Takarajimasha
- Magazine: Kono Manga ga Sugoi! Web
- Original run: January 15, 2016 – September 16, 2016
- Volumes: 2
- Manga

Hibike! Euphonium: Kitauji Kōkō Suisōgaku-bu, Saidai no Kiki
- Written by: Ayano Takeda
- Illustrated by: Hami
- Published by: Takarajimasha
- Magazine: Kono Manga ga Sugoi! Web
- Original run: October 21, 2016 – July 21, 2017
- Volumes: 2
- Original video animation

Sound! Euphonium: Ensemble Contest
- Directed by: Tatsuya Ishihara
- Written by: Jukki Hanada
- Music by: Akito Matsuda
- Studio: Kyoto Animation
- Released: August 4, 2023
- Runtime: 57 minutes
- Anime films
- Sound! Euphonium: The Movie – Welcome to the Kitauji High School Concert Band (2016); Sound! Euphonium: The Movie – May the Melody Reach You! (2017); Liz and the Blue Bird (2018); Sound! Euphonium: The Movie – Our Promise: A Brand New Day (2019); Sound! Euphonium: The Final Movie (2026)
- icon

Sound! Euphonium (Japanese: 響け! ユーフォニアム, Hepburn: Hibike! Yūfoniamu) is a Japanese novel series written by Ayano Takeda. The story is set in Uji, Kyoto and focuses on the Kitauji High School Music Club, whose concert band is steadily improving thanks to the newly appointed adviser's strict instruction.

A manga adaptation illustrated by Hami was serialized on the Kono Manga ga Sugoi! Web website. Kyoto Animation was in charge of its anime adaptations: it produced two seasons of a television series adaptation in 2015 and 2016, depicting the first high school year of the main character, Kumiko Oumae. Two animated films titled Liz and the Blue Bird and Sound! Euphonium: The Movie – Our Promise: A Brand New Day, both taking place during Kumiko's second year of high school, premiered in 2018 and 2019 respectively. A third season focused on Kumiko in her third year of high school aired in 2024, preceded by the theatrical OVA Ensemble Contest in 2023.

== Plot ==
The Kitauji High School Concert Band Club had at one time participated in national tournaments and was a championship-caliber school, but after the club's adviser changed, they had not been able to even participate in the qualifying tournament. However, thanks to the newly appointed adviser's strict instruction, the students are steadily improving and building up their strength. As they fight over who plays solos, some students give priority to studying and quit the club activities. Finally, the long wished-for day of the competition arrives.

== Characters ==
=== Main characters ===
Kumiko Oumae (黄前 久美子, Ōmae Kumiko)
Voiced by: Tomoyo Kurosawa (Japanese); Courtney Shaw (Liz and the Blue Bird); Erica Mendez (TV anime/Our Promise: A Brand New Day) (English)
Kumiko, a first-year high school student, is the main protagonist of Sound! Euphonium. She speaks standard Japanese, despite growing up in Kansai. She is easily swayed by the opinions of others and is an indecisive person. She dislikes her personality because she cannot make her wishes known to others nor have the courage to interfere with social affairs. She is a euphonium player in the concert band. She lives near Byodoin Temple with her elder sister and parents.

Reina Kousaka (高坂 麗奈, Kōsaka Reina)
Voiced by: Chika Anzai (Japanese); Cristina Vee (Liz and the Blue Bird); Laura Post (TV anime/Our Promise: A Brand New Day) (English)
Reina is a beautiful trumpet player with long black hair. She was a member of the concert band club at the same junior high school as Kumiko. She is a dedicated trumpet player and goes to the music classroom even outside of club activities. Though she has a polite disposition, she is not viewed so well by others because she usually has a surly expression. She cherishes her trumpet, which was given to her by her parents when she was a junior high school student. She has feelings for her teacher Taki.

Asuka Tanaka (田中 あすか, Tanaka Asuka)
Voiced by: Minako Kotobuki (Japanese); Reba Buhr (English)
Asuka is a third-year student and vice president of the concert band club. She plays the euphonium and leads the bass section. Whenever the club is marching, she leads the band as drum major. She is a natural beauty with glasses and has a playful personality. However in the second season, this is revealed to be mostly a facade to hide her true feelings from her classmates.

Noboru Taki (滝 昇, Taki Noboru)
Voiced by: Takahiro Sakurai (Japanese); Wayne Grayson (Liz and the Blue Bird); Robbie Daymond (TV anime/Our Promise: A Brand New Day) (English)
Taki is the new music teacher in Kitauji High School and serves as the adviser to the concert band club. He is also in charge of Class 5 of the second-year students. He is polite and has a methodical personality. He emphasizes independence in his students, and to this end he pushes them to reach their goal of going to the national competition.

Mayu Kuroe (黒江 真由, Kuroe Mayu)
Voiced by: Haruka Tomatsu
Mayu is a euphonium player who transfers to Kitauji High School at the start of Kumiko's third year. Mayu previously attended Seira Girls High School in Fukuoka, a school that is well known for their strong band program.

=== First-year students ===
Hazuki Katou (加藤 葉月, Katō Hazuki)
Voiced by: Ayaka Asai (Japanese); Alyson Leigh Rosenfeld (Liz and the Blue Bird); Jennifer Losi (TV anime/Our Promise: A Brand New Day) (English)
Hazuki is a friendly girl who talks innocently. She is Kumiko's classmate and is suntanned because she belonged to the tennis club when she was a junior high school student. She is a beginner at music. She admires the trumpet and joined the concert band club, but ended up playing the tuba, which she calls "Tubacabra" (チューバカブラ, Chūbakabura; a portmanteau of the Japanese transliterations of tuba as chūba (チューバ) and chupacabra as chupakabura (チュパカブラ)). She is a bright, perky mood-maker, and the type of person who prefers standing out over supporting others.

Sapphire Kawashima (川島 緑輝, Kawashima Safaia) / Midori (緑)
Voiced by: Moe Toyota (Japanese); Cassandra Lee Morris (Liz and the Blue Bird); Kayli Mills (TV anime/Our Promise: A Brand New Day) (English)
Sapphire is a girl with soft hair and a delicate constitution. She is often timid due to her lack of self-confidence. She is embarrassed by her own name "Sapphire" (緑輝, Safaia; lit."green brilliancy") , so she tells people to call her "Midori". She is from a junior high school named Seijo (聖女) which has a competitive concert band club. She plays the upright bass, which she endearingly calls "George", and electric bass.

Shuuichi Tsukamoto (塚本 秀一, Tsukamoto Shūichi)
Voiced by: Haruki Ishiya (Japanese); Christian La Monte (TV anime/Our Promise: A Brand New Day) (English)
Shuuichi is a first-year high school student. He is Kumiko's childhood friend, and the two went to the same junior high school. He and Kumiko are not classmates in high school because they are studying different courses. They previously had a falling out, due to Shuuichi having made a snide remark about Kumiko when they were in their third year of junior high school. He was originally a French horn player, but he gets to play the trombone after winning a game of rock-paper-scissors.

Chikao Takigawa (瀧川 ちかお, Takigawa Chikao)
A first-year student and Shuuichi's friend. He plays the tenor saxophone.

Akiko Yoshizawa (吉沢 秋子, Yoshizawa Akiko)
A first-year student who plays the trumpet.

Lala Hitomi (瞳 ララ, Hitomi Rara)
A first-year student who plays the French horn.

Hiyoko Ueda (植田 日和子, Ueda Hiyoko)
A first-year student who plays the clarinet.

=== Second-year students ===
Natsuki Nakagawa (中川 夏紀, Nakagawa Natsuki)
Voiced by: Konomi Fujimura (Japanese); Sarah Anne Williams (English)
Natsuki is a second-year student who plays the euphonium. She is lazy and often found sleeping, but she works hard when something motivates her. She becomes the band vice president in her third year.

Yuuko Yoshikawa (吉川 優子, Yoshikawa Yūko)
Voiced by: Yuri Yamaoka (Japanese); Megan Harvey (English)
Yuuko is a second-year student who plays the trumpet. She adores Kaori and has a begrudging friendship with Natsuki. She becomes the band president in her third year.

Mizore Yoroizuka (鎧塚 みぞれ, Yoroizuka Mizore)
Voiced by: Atsumi Tanezaki (Japanese); Laurie Hymes (Liz and the Blue Bird) (English)
Mizore is a quiet second-year student who plays the oboe. She was friends with Nozomi in middle school.

Nozomi Kasaki (傘木 希美, Kasaki Nozomi)
Voiced by: Nao Tōyama (Japanese); Stephanie Sheh (Liz and the Blue Bird) (English)
Nozomi is a second-year student who plays the flute. She dropped out of band in her first year.

Takuya Gotou (後藤 卓也, Gotō Takuya)
Voiced by: Kenjiro Tsuda (Japanese); Patrick Seitz (TV anime/Our Promise: A Brand New Day) (English)
A second-year student who is a tall, calm, and taciturn youth. He plays the tuba and sousaphone.

Riko Nagase (長瀬 梨子, Nagase Riko)
Voiced by: Miyuki Kobori (Japanese); Lauren Landa (TV anime/Our Promise: A Brand New Day) (English)
A second-year student and Takuya's girlfriend. She also plays the tuba and sousaphone.

Tomoe Kabe (加部友恵, Kabe Tomoe)
Voiced by: Azusa Tadokoro (Japanese); Erika Harlacher (Our Promise: A Brand New Day) (English)
A second-year student who plays the trumpet. In her third year, she was tasked alongside Kumiko to instruct and manage the new first-year members of the band.

Keina Iwata (岩田慧菜, Iwata Keina)
A second-year student who plays the trombone. In her third year, she plays the bass trombone and becomes the trombone section leader.

Miyoko Ohno (大野 美代子, Ohno Miyoko)
A second-year student who is a percussionist as the timpani player. She can also play the harp.

=== Third-year students ===
Haruka Ogasawara (小笠原 晴香, Ogasawara Haruka)
Voiced by: Saori Hayami (Japanese); Allegra Clark (TV anime/Our Promise: A Brand New Day) (English)
Haruka is a third-year student and president of the concert band. She plays the baritone saxophone and leads the saxophone section. She is a strong-minded character, but has low self-esteem.

Kaori Nakaseko (中世古 香織, Nakaseko Kaori)
Voiced by: Minori Chihara (Japanese); Ryan Bartley (TV anime/Our Promise: A Brand New Day) (English)
Kaori is a third-year student. She has deep black hair and a gentle character, making her quite popular in the band. She plays the trumpet and is the section leader, in addition to being the band accountant.

Aoi Saitou (斎藤 葵, Saitō Aoi)
Voiced by: Yoko Hikasa (Japanese); Deneen Melody (English)
Aoi is a childhood friend of Kumiko, and she is two years her senior. The two often played together, as they lived in the same neighborhood. She and Kumiko drifted apart in junior high school. They are reunited in the concert band, although they do not talk much. She plays the tenor saxophone. She quit the band to focus on her college entrance exams.

Hirone Torizuka (鳥塚 ヒロネ, Torizuka Hirone)
A third-year student who is the concertmaster and leader of the clarinet section.

Kotoko Himegami (姫神 琴子, Himegami Kotoko)
A third-year student who leads the flute and piccolo section.

Juri Sawada (沢田 樹里, Sawada Juri)
A third-year student who leads the horn section.

Hideri Noguchi (野口 ヒデリ, Noguchi Hideri)
A third-year student who leads the trombone section.

Narai Tanabe (田邊 名来, Tanabe Narai)
A third-year student who leads the percussion section. He plays the snare drum and the drum kit. His nickname is "Knuckle".

Raina Kitamura (喜多村 来南, Kitamura Raina)
A third-year student who leads the bassoon and oboe section. She plays the bassoon.

Shouko Hagiwara (萩原 笙子, Hagiwara Shōko)
A third-year student who is the band's photographer. She plays the clarinet.

Yoriko Souga (雑賀 頼子, Sōga Yoriko)
A third-year student who is the band's sheet music librarian. She plays the piccolo.

Tsune Watanabe (渡辺 つね, Watanabe Tsune)
A third-year student who is the band's alumni coordinator. She plays the flute. Her nickname is "Chabudai" (ちゃぶ台, lit. "Small table").

Raimu Okamoto (岡本 来夢, Okamoto Raimu)
A third-year student who plays the alto saxophone. Her lucky charm is written "L.O."

Hitoshi Usui (臼井 ひとし, Usui Hitoshi)
A third-year student who plays the bass clarinet.

Mei Taura (田浦愛衣, Taura Mei)
A third-year student who plays the trombone. She and Hideri are dating.

=== New first-year students ===
Kanade Hisaishi (久石 奏, Hisaishi Kanade)
Voiced by: Sora Amamiya (Japanese); Christine Marie Cabanos (English)
A new first-year student who plays the euphonium. She gives off a good impression to everyone who sees her, but there is a hidden side to her always-polite personality.

Mirei Suzuki (鈴木 美玲, Suzuki Mirei)
Voiced by: Ayaka Nanase (Japanese); Katelyn Gault (English)
A new first-year student who plays the tuba and is quite tall. She takes everything very seriously and is a bit antisocial.

Satsuki Suzuki (鈴木 さつき, Suzuki Satsuki)
Voiced by: Misaki Kuno (Japanese); Xanthe Huynh (English)
A new first-year student who plays the tuba and is quite short. Like Hazuki, she is very friendly.

Motomu Tsukinaga (月永 求, Tsukinaga Motomu)
Voiced by: Shimba Tsuchiya (Japanese); Lucien Dodge (English)
A new first-year student who plays the double bass. He hates being called by his surname.

=== Others ===
Michie Matsumoto (松本 美知恵, Matsumoto Michie)
Voiced by: Aya Hisakawa (Japanese); Cindy Robinson (Our Promise: A Brand New Day) (English)
Michie is Kumiko's homeroom teacher and is the vice-advisor of the concert band. She is known as an intimidating teacher.

Mamiko Oumae (黄前 麻美子, Ōmae Mamiko)
Voiced by: Manami Numakura (Japanese); Erika Harlacher (English)
Mamiko is Kumiko's older sister. She is a college student and was a trombone player.

Akiko Oumae (黄前 明子, Ōmae Akiko)
Voiced by: Haruhi Nanao
Akiko is Kumiko and Mamiko's mother. Her given name is not mentioned in the original novels.

Akemi Tanaka (田中 明美, Tanaka Akemi)
Voiced by: Kumiko Watanabe
Akemi is Asuka's mother. She tried to make Asuka quit the band.

Azusa Sasaki (佐々木 梓, Sasaki Azusa)
Voiced by: Azusa Tadokoro (Japanese); Abby Espiritu (English)
Azusa is Kumiko's friend from junior high school. She admitted to Rikka High School (立華高校, Rikka Kōkō), known for its marching band. She plays the trombone. She is the protagonist of the Rikka-centric spinoff novels.

Kohaku Kawashima (川島 琥珀, Kawashima Kohaku)
Voiced by: Haruka Chisuga
Kohaku is Sapphire's little sister. She is a character created for the anime television series and appears in the eighth episode. Her name means "amber" in Japanese.

Masahiro Hashimoto (橋本 真博, Hashimoto Masahiro)
Voiced by: Yuichi Nakamura (Japanese); Mike Pollock (Liz and the Blue Bird); Patrick Seitz (Our Promise: A Brand New Day) (English)
A percussion specialist and longtime friend of Noboru Taki's.

Satomi Niiyama (新山 聡美, Niiyama Satomi)
Voiced by: Houko Kuwashima (Japanese); Ryan Bartley (English)
A woodwind specialist and longtime friend of Noboru Taki's.

Masakazu Shindo (進藤 正和, Shindō Masakazu)
Shindo is Asuka's father. Asuka's parents divorced when Asuka was two years old. He is a prominent euphonist and author of book Fun Euphonium (たのしい ユーフォニアム, Tanoshī Yūfoniamu) for beginner euphonists. When Asuka was in first grade, he sent her the euphonium she now plays and a notebook full of euphonium pieces entitled Sound! Euphonium (響け! ユーフォニアム, Hibike! Yūfoniamu).

== Media ==
=== Novels ===
Sound! Euphonium is a 319-page novel written by Ayano Takeda, and features cover art drawn by Nikki Asada. Takarajimasha published the novel on December 5, 2013. Two sequel novels were released on March 5 and April 4, 2015. In addition, a short story collection was released on May 25, 2015. In 2016, a spin-off novel about Rikka High School Marching Band was released in two volumes on August 4 and September 6. Another spin-off novel was released on October 6, 2016. A two-part sequel to the novels was released on August 26 and October 5, 2017; the story takes place in Kumiko's second year and Mizore's third year of high school. Another short story collection was released on April 5, 2018. Two follow-up novel volumes focused on Kumiko's third and final year on high school were released in April and May 2019. Another volume, portraying the graduation of the band seniors, was released on February 13, 2021. Another short story collection was released on June 27, 2024.

Yen Press released the first volume of the novel series in English in June 2017.

No.	Title	Original release date	English release date
1	Sound! Euphonium: Welcome to the Kitauji High School Concert Band (Note: Kitauji (北宇治), is translated as "North Uji" at the English official website. Although the subtitle is sometimes translated as Welcome to Kitauji High School's Musical Instrument Club, suisōgaku (吹奏楽) actually means "concert band (wind ensemble)", not "musical instrument".); Hibike! Yūfoniamu: Kitauji Kōkō Suisōgaku-bu e Yōkoso (響け! ユーフォニアム 北宇治高校吹奏楽部へようこそ)	December 5, 2013; 978-4-8002-1747-9	June 20, 2017; 978-0-316-55859-4
Prologue: 1. Nice to Meet You, Euphonium; 2. I'm Home, Festival; 3. Welcome Back, Audition; 4. Good-Bye, Competition; Epilogue
2	Sound! Euphonium 2: The Hottest Summer of Kitauji High School Concert Band; Hibike! Yūfoniamu 2: Kitauji Kōkō Suisōgaku-bu no Ichiban Atsui Natsu (響け! ユーフォニアム2 北宇治高校吹奏楽部のいちばん熱い夏)	March 5, 2015; 978-4-8002-3906-8	—
3	Sound! Euphonium 3: The Greatest Crisis of Kitauji High School Concert Band; Hibike! Yūfoniamu 3: Kitauji Kōkō Suisōgaku-bu, Saidai no Kiki (響け! ユーフォニアム3 北宇治高校吹奏楽部、最大の危機)	April 4, 2015; 978-4-8002-3982-2	—
4	Sound! Euphonium: Secret Story of Kitauji High School Concert Band; Hibike! Yūfoniamu: Kitauji Kōkō Suisōgaku-bu no Himitsu no Hanashi (響け! ユーフォニアム 北宇治高校吹奏楽部のヒミツの話)	May 25, 2015; 978-4-8002-4119-1	—
5	Sound! Euphonium Series: Welcome to the Rikka High School Marching Band (part 1); Hibike! Yūfoniam Shirīzu Rikka Kōkō Māchingu Bando e Yōkoso Zenpen (響け! ユーフォニアムシリーズ 立華高校マーチングバンドへようこそ 前編)	August 4, 2016; 978-4-8002-5872-4	—
6	Sound! Euphonium Series: Welcome to the Rikka High School Marching Band (part 2); Hibike! Yūfoniam Shirīzu Rikka Kōkō Māchingu Bando e Yōkoso Kōhen (響け! ユーフォニアムシリーズ 立華高校マーチングバンドへようこそ 後編)	September 6, 2016; 978-4-8002-5874-8	—
7	Sound! Euphonium Kitauji High School Concert Band Diary; Hibike! Yūfoniam Kitauji Kōkō no Suisōgaku-bu Nisshi (響け! ユーフォニアム 北宇治高校の吹奏楽部日誌)	October 6, 2016; 978-4-8002-6226-4	—
8	Sound! Euphonium Kitauji High School Concert Band, Second Turbulent Movement (part 1); Hibike! Yūfoniamu Kitauji Kōkō Suisōgaku-bu, Haran no Dainigakushō Zenpen (響け! ユーフォニアム 北宇治高校吹奏楽部、波乱の第二楽章 前編)	August 26, 2017; 978-4-8002-7489-2	—
9	Sound! Euphonium Kitauji High School Concert Band, Second Turbulent Movement (part 2); Hibike! Yūfoniamu Kitauji Kōkō Suisōgaku-bu, Haran no Dainigakushō Kōhen (響け! ユーフォニアム 北宇治高校吹奏楽部、波乱の第二楽章 後編)	October 5, 2017; 978-4-8002-7491-5	—
10	Sound! Euphonium: True Stories from the Kitauji High School Concert Band; Hibike! Yūfoniamu Kitauji Kōkō Suisōgaku-bu no Honto no Hanashi (響け！ ユーフォニアム 北宇治高校吹奏楽部のホントの話)	April 5, 2018; 978-4-8002-8301-6	—
11	Sound! Euphonium: The Kitauji High School Concert Band's Decisive Final Movement (part 1); Hibike! Yūfoniamu Kitauji Kōkō Suisōgaku-bu, Ketsui no Saishū Gakushō Zenpen (響け！ ユーフォニアム 北宇治高校吹奏楽部、決意の最終楽章 前編)	April 17, 2019; 978-4-8002-9399-2	—
12	Sound! Euphonium: The Kitauji High School Concert Band's Decisive Final Movement (part 2); Hibike! Yūfoniamu Kitauji Kōkō Suisōgaku-bu, Ketsui no Saishū Gakushō Kōhen (響け！ ユーフォニアム 北宇治高校吹奏楽部、決意の最終楽章 後編)	June 22, 2019; 978-4-8002-9401-2	—
13	Watching as You Fly Away; Tobitatsu Kimi no Se o Miageru (飛び立つ君の背を見上げる)	February 13, 2021 (hardback); August 4, 2023 (paperback); 978-4-299-01351-4; 978-4-299-04598-0	—
14	Sound! Euphonium: Everyone's Stories from the Kitauji High School Concert Band; Hibike! Yūfoniamu Kitauji Kōkō Suisōgaku-bu no Min'na no Hanashi (響け! ユーフォニアム 北宇治高校吹奏楽部のみんなの話)	June 27, 2024; 978-4-299-05621-4	—

=== Manga ===
A manga adaptation of the first novel illustrated by Hami was serialized on the Kono Manga ga Sugoi! Web website between November 28, 2014, and October 30, 2015. Takarajimasha published three tankōbon volumes between April 3 and November 20, 2015. A manga adaptation of the second novel followed, and was serialized between January 15 and September 16, 2016; the first volume was released on September 8, 2016, and the second on October 11, 2016. A manga adaptation of the third novel followed, and was serialized between October 21, 2016, and July 21, 2017; the first volume was released on July 20, 2017, and the second volume on August 26, 2017.

=== Anime ===
==== Television series ====
A 13-episode anime television series adaptation of the first volume of the novel series, directed by Tatsuya Ishihara, written by Jukki Hanada, and produced by Kyoto Animation, aired in Japan between April 8 and July 1, 2015. Naoko Yamada served as series production director. The opening theme is "Dream Solister" by True, and the ending theme is "Tutti!" (トゥッティ！; Italian: All!) by Tomoyo Kurosawa, Ayaka Asai, Moe Toyota, and Chika Anzai. The ending theme for episode 8 is a trumpet and euphonium duet version of "Ai o Mitsuketa Basho" (愛を見つけた場所; "The Place Where We Found Love") and the ending theme for episode 13 is a wind orchestra version of "Dream Solister". Crunchyroll streamed the series. The seventh DVD/BD volume, released on December 16, 2015, bundled an original video animation (OVA) episode titled "Ready, Set, Monaka" (かけだすモナカ, Kakedasu Monaka). Kyoto Animation produced an anime film retelling the events of the television series, Sound! Euphonium: The Movie – Welcome to the Kitauji High School Concert Band, which premiered on April 23, 2016.

A second season of the television series began airing on October 6, 2016. The opening theme is "Soundscape" (サウンドスケープ, Saundosukēpu) by True, and the ending theme is "Vivace!" (ヴィヴァーチェ!, Vivāche!) by Kurosawa, Asai, Toyota, and Anzai. The ending theme for episode 9 is a euphonium solo version of "Sound! Euphonium" (響け! ユーフォニアム, Hibike! Yūfoniamu) (uncredited) and the ending theme for episode 13 is an orchestra version of "Sound! Euphonium". A short anime, titled "Hanabi-taikai Kiss e Yōkoso" (花火大会キッスへようこそ！; "Welcome to the Fireworks Festival Kiss"), was bundled with the second season's first home video release volume, which was released on December 21, 2016. A second anime film retelling the events of the second season, Sound! Euphonium: The Movie – May the Melody Reach You!, was released on September 30, 2017.

A new anime project was announced in 2019, focusing on Kumiko as a student in her third year. It was later revealed to be a third season that premiered on April 7, 2024, on NHK Educational TV. The opening theme for the third season is "ReCoda" by True, while the ending theme is "Neiro no Kanata" (音色の彼方; "Beyond the Timbre") by the "Kitauji Quartet". A theatrical film version of the third season, titled Sound! Euphonium: The Final Movie, was announced on March 16, 2025. The first part premiered on April 24, 2026, and the second on September 11.

==== Films and OVA ====
Two new animated films telling the events of Kumiko's second year at Kitauji High were scheduled for release in 2018. The first film, directed by Naoko Yamada and written by Reiko Yoshida, titled Liz and the Blue Bird (リズと青い鳥, Rizu to Aoi Tori), focuses on Nozomi and Mizore and premiered on April 21, 2018. The second film, titled Sound! Euphonium: The Movie – Our Promise: A Brand New Day (劇場版 響け！ユーフォニアム～誓いのフィナーレ～, Gekijōban Hibike! Yūfoniamu: Chikai no Fināre; lit. 'Oath's Finale' or 'Oath of the Finale') and originally scheduled for release in 2018, is directed by Tatsuya Ishihara and focuses on Kumiko as a student in her second year and premiered on April 19, 2019.

Along with re-confirmation of the third season, the theatrical OVA Sound! Euphonium: Ensemble Contest was announced in 2022, and was released on August 4, 2023. Tatsuya Ishihara returned to direct the OVA, with Taichi Ogawa serving as assistant director, Jukki Hanada writing the screenplay, Shoko Ikeda being posthumously credited for the character designs, and Akito Matsuda composing the music. The theme song is "Ensemble" by True.

==== English release ====
The anime was formerly licensed by Ponycan USA in North America, and licensed by Anime Limited in the United Kingdom. Theatrical distributor Eleven Arts released Liz and the Blue Bird in theaters on November 9, 2018, in the United States. Shout! Factory released it on home video on March 5, 2019. Our Promise was released in select US theaters on July 11, 2019, and the English dub debuted on July 15, 2019. The English dub has a different voice cast, commissioned by VSI Los Angeles, compared to Liz and the Blue Bird, though Sarah Anne Williams, Ryan Bartley and Megan Harvey reprised their roles as Natsuki, Satomi and Yuko, respectively. The film was released on a DVD/Blu-Ray set on June 2, 2020, from Shout Factory.

An English dub of the first season was released on Blu-ray by Crunchyroll on December 17, 2024, and retains much of the cast of Our Promise: A Brand New Day.

=== Music ===
Wind ensemble music for both seasons were performed by the 2014 Freshman Wind Ensemble (フレッシュマン ウィンド アンサンブル) of the Senzoku Gakuen College of Music. Original music was composed and some featured pieces were arranged by Akito Matsuda (松田彬人, Matsuda Akito).

Featured music
No.	Title	Music	Length
1.	"Abarenbō Shōgun Theme" (暴れん坊将軍のテーマ; episode 1.1)	Shunsuke Kikuchi
2.	"Infernal Galop" (from Orpheus in the Underworld; episodes 1.1 and 1.12)	Jacques Offenbach
3.	"The Marines" (episodes 1.3–1.4) (piece incorporates Marines' Hymn (Note: The music from the "Gendarmes' Duet" from Offenbach's opera Geneviève de Brabant.) in second part)	James M. Fulton and Jacques Offenbach (uncredited)
4.	"Symphony No. 9" (part II Largo, episode 1.3)	Antonín Dvořák
5.	"The Fairest of the Fair" (episode 1.5)	John Philip Sousa
6.	"Funiculì, Funiculà" (episode 1.5)	Luigi Denza
7.	"Rydeen" (ライディーン; episode 1.5) (from Solid State Survivor by Yellow Magic Orchestra)	Yukihiro Takahashi
8.	"Crescent Moon Dance" (三日月の舞; episodes 1.6–1.13, 2.1–2.3, 2.5, 2.7, 2.9, and 2.13)	Namie Horikawa (Note: Fictional female composer.) (Akito Matsuda)
9.	"Twinkle, Twinkle, Little Star" (episode 1.6)	French folk song
10.	"Ai o Mitsuketa Basho" (愛を見つけた場所 (The Place Where We Found Love); episode 1.8)	Hanako Oku
11.	"Wind of Provence (Note: The fourth of five required pieces for real-life All-Japan Band Competition 2015.)" (プロヴァンスの風; episodes 1.10, 1.13, 2.3, and 2.5)	Naoki Tasaka
12.	"Scheherazade" (episode 1.13)	Nikolai Rimsky-Korsakov
13.	"Gakuen Tengoku" (学园天国; episodes 2.1 and 2.6)	Tadao Inoue
14.	"Finale from Symphony No. 4" (episode 2.1)	Pyotr Ilyich Tchaikovsky
15.	"Gliding Dance of the Maidens (Polovtsian Dances)" (episodes 2.1–2.2, and 2.5)	Alexander Borodin
16.	"Rhapsody on a Theme of Paganini" (episode 2.5)	Sergei Rachmaninoff
17.	"Kimi wa Tennenshoku" (君は天然色; episode 2.6) (from A Long Vacation)	Eiichi Ohtaki
18.	"Takarajima" (宝島 (Treasure Island); episode 2.7) (from S.P.O.R.T.S. by T-Square)	Hirotaka Izumi
19.	"American Patrol" (episode 2.8)	Frank W. Meacham
20.	"Kitauji Shijuusou Dai-1-ban Euphonium" (北宇治四重奏 第1番 ユーフォニアム; episode 2.8)	Akito Matsuda (Note: In the anime's plot, the piece was credited by Shindo Masakazu.)
21.	"Hibike! Yūfoniamu" (響け! ユーフォニアム; episodes 2.3, 2.9, and 2.13 (Note: Due to the plot, the piece name was not disclosed until the end of episode 2.13, so it was uncredited for episodes 2.3 and 2.9.))	Shindo Masakazu (Note: Fictional male composer.) (Akito Matsuda)
22.	"Starting the project (Note: Music from promotion video for season 1.)" (episode 2.13)	Akito Matsuda

== Reception ==
In April 2018, it was reported that the novels had more than 1.4 million copies in print in Japan.

The anime adaptation has often been criticized by Western viewers for perceived queerbaiting with regards to the relationship between lead characters Kumiko Oumae and Reina Kousaka, often involving significant homoerotic rewriting of the originally heterosexual scenes of the original novel series. Crunchyroll's Twitter account acknowledged the pairing by tweeting a screenshot from the show, which was still airing and being officially simulcast by the service at the time, in the wake of the legalization of same-sex marriage in the United States. The adaptation's director and showrunner, Naoko Yamada, has either denied any intention of depicting romance in some instances or expressed a desire to allow the audience themselves to determine the nature of the characters' relationships in others.

In 2015, Nio Nakatani praised the anime for its perceived yuri aspects, which she said had inspired her while she was drawing Bloom Into You. According to her, the first season of the anime "created the yuri that she wanted to write before she did" and she was so excited about the show that she started drawing yuri under its influence before she even realized that it "had a lot of yuri elements."

== See also ==
- Flower and Asura, another series also written by Ayano Takeda
