= Moe Toyota =

Japanese voice actress

- 豊田 萌絵
- Born: March 15, 1995 (age 31); Ibaraki Prefecture, Japan
- Occupation: Voice actress
- Years active: 2012–present
- Agent: HiBiKi
- Musical career
- Genre: J-pop
- Instrument: Vocals

Moe Toyota (豊田 萌絵, Toyota Moe; born March 15, 1995) is a Japanese voice actress and singer signed to HiBiKi and a member of the musical unit StylipS. Her major voice roles include Sapphire Kawashima in Sound! Euphonium, Kanon Matsubara in BanG Dream!, Vivi Lin in idol Memories, Fumi Kujo in Jinsei, and Fuyumi Fukagawa in Pan de Peace!.

== Filmography ==
=== Anime ===
Year	Title	Role	Note	Source
2012	Nakaimo – My Sister Is Among Them!	student		
2012	So, I Can't Play H!	Girl		
2013	Beyond the Boundary	Sakura Inami		
2013	Chronicles of the Going Home Club	Referee		
2013	Polar Bear Café			
2014	Jinsei	Fumi Kujō		
2014	Love, Tenchi Muyo!	student		
2014	Recently, My Sister Is Unusual	Mei-chan, tennis staff B		
2014	Saki – The Nationals	Kurumi Kakura		
2015	Sound! Euphonium	Sapphire Kawashima		
2016	Pan de Peace!	Fuyumi Fukagawa		
2016	Idol Memories	Vivi Lin		
2016	Sound! Euphonium 2	Sapphire Kawashima		
2017	Action Heroine Cheer Fruits	Hatsuri Momoi		
2018	BanG Dream! Girls Band Party! Pico	Kanon Matsubara		
2019	BanG Dream! 2nd Season	Kanon Matsubara		
2019	BanG Dream! Film Live	Kanon Matsubara		
2019	Hulaing Babies	Moe		
2019	Nobunaga Teacher's Young Bride	Anna Atsuta		
2020	BanG Dream! 3rd Season	Kanon Matsubara		
2020	BanG Dream! Girls Band Party! Pico: Ohmori	Kanon Matsubara		
2020	Hulaing Babies☆Petit	Moe		
2020	King's Raid: Successors of the Will	Jane		
2021	BanG Dream! Film Live 2nd Stage	Kanon Matsubara		
2021	BanG Dream! Girls Band Party! Pico Fever!	Kanon Matsubara		
2022	Teppen!!!!!!!!!!!!!!! Laughing 'til You Cry	Misao Ushiku		
2022	Boruto: Naruto Next Generations	Hibiki		
2024	The Many Sides of Voice Actor Radio	Yūhi Yūgure/ Chika Watanabe		
2024	Sound! Euphonium 3	Sapphire Kawashima		

=== Films ===
- Sound! Euphonium: The Movie – Welcome to the Kitauji High School Concert Band (2016) – Sapphire Kawashima
- Sound! Euphonium: The Movie – May the Melody Reach You! (2017) – Sapphire Kawashima
- Liz and the Blue Bird (2018) – Sapphire Kawashima
- Sound! Euphonium: The Movie – Our Promise: A Brand New Day (2019) – Sapphire Kawashima
- Idol Bu Show (2022) – Koharu Hoshizuki

=== OVA ===
- Kissxsis (2013) – Discipline committee member
- Recently, My Sister Is Unusual (2014) – Mei-chan
- Sound! Euphonium; theatrical OVA (TBA) (2023) – Sapphire Kawashima

=== Video games ===
- Thousand Memories (2013)
- Fairy Fencer F (2013) – Khalara
- Omega Quintet (2014) – Kanadeko
- Girl Friend Beta (2014) – Yuka Koizumi
- Heroes Placement (2014) - Fenrir White
- Groove Coaster 3: Link Fever (2016) – Linka
- BanG Dream! Girls Band Party! – Kanon Matsubara
- Shadowverse – Leaf Man
- King's Raid (2018) – Jane, May
- Last Period (2020) – Huskeal
- Blue Archive (2021) – Hanako Urawa
- Link! Like! Love Live! (2023) – Tsukasa Murano
- Magia Record (2023) – Mitsuru Inami
- Arknights (2025) – Haruka
- Magia Exedra (2025) – Fuka Higure
- Nekopara: Sekai Connect (2026) – Muffin
