= Sound! Euphonium: The Movie – Our Promise: A Brand New Day =

2019 Japanese animated film by Tatsuya Ishihara

- Theatrical release poster
- Kanji: 劇場版 響け！ユーフォニアム ～誓いのフィナーレ～
- Revised Hepburn: Gekijōban Hibike! Yūfoniamu: Chikai no Fināre
- Directed by: Tatsuya Ishihara
- Screenplay by: Jukki Hanada
- Based on: Sound! Euphonium by Ayano Takeda
- Produced by: Nagaharu Ohashi; Megumi Suzuki; Shigeru Saitō; Shinichi Nakamura; Yoshifumi Yarimizu
- Starring: Tomoyo Kurosawa; Ayaka Asai; Moe Toyota; Chika Anzai; Haruki Ishiya; Konomi Fujimura; Yuri Yamaoka; Kenjiro Tsuda; Miyuki Kobori; Sora Amamiya; Ayaka Nanase; Misaki Kuno; Shimba Tsuchiya; Minako Kotobuki; Takahiro Sakurai
- Cinematography: Kazuya Takao
- Edited by: Kengo Shigemura
- Music by: Akito Matsuda
- Production company: Kyoto Animation
- Distributed by: Shochiku
- Release dates: April 5, 2019 (Yūrakuchō, Tokyo); April 19, 2019 (Japan)
- Running time: 100 minutes
- Country: Japan
- Language: Japanese
- Box office: ¥320 million

Sound! Euphonium: The Movie – Our Promise: A Brand New Day (Note: Japanese: 劇場版 響け！ユーフォニアム ～誓いのフィナーレ～, Hepburn: Gekijōban Hibike! Yūfoniamu: Chikai no Fināre; lit. 'Sound! Euphonium: The Movie – Oath's Finale' or 'Sound! Euphonium: The Movie – Oath of the Finale') is a 2019 Japanese animated film based on the novel series Sound! Euphonium by Ayano Takeda and a sequel to the two seasons of the anime television series adaptation. Produced by Kyoto Animation and distributed by Shochiku, the film is directed by Tatsuya Ishihara from a script written by Jukki Hanada. The film follows Kumiko Ōmae in her second year at Kitauji High School mentoring new first-year students who have joined the school's concert band.

The film was one of the two new anime projects announced by the studio in June 2017, with Ishihara being confirmed as its director. It received its official title in June 2018, with Tomoyo Kurosawa confirming her return to voice Kumiko and new characters being unveiled. Additional staff and cast were revealed in September and December 2018.

Sound! Euphonium: The Movie – Our Promise: A Brand New Day had a screening in Yūrakuchō, Tokyo on April 5, 2019, and was released in Japan on April 19. The film grossed ¥320 million in Japan. The third season of the anime series, which premiered on April 7, 2024, and had a theatrical version released on April 24, 2026, continues Kumiko's story as she enters third year in high school.

== Plot ==
On the first day of the school year as a second-year student at Kitauji High School, Kumiko Ōmae meets first-year student Kanade Hisaishi, who joins the school's concert band to play euphonium. First-year students Mirei Suzuki, Satsuki Suzuki, and Motomu Tsukinaga also join the band's bass section. On the first day of the band's practice, Yūko Yoshikawa, the band's president, assigns Kumiko and Tomoe Kabe to oversee the newly joined first-year students and sets the goal for the band to win gold at the national concert band competition. Kumiko notices a distance between the juniors and seniors. At the Sunrise Festival, Mirei leaves the band because she finds Hazuki Katō and Satsuki joking around instead of taking the performance seriously, just like what she wants since joining the band. Kumiko goes after her along with Kanade and convinces her to return. Kitauji High School Concert Band successfully performs at the festival.

At band practice, Noboru Taki announces the designated piece for the competition is "March Sky Blue Dream", the free piece is "Liz and the Blue Bird", and the upcoming audition. Kumiko accompanies her boyfriend Shūichi Tsukamoto at a prefectural festival and later meets up with Reina Kōsaka, who both discuss their future since they are about to enter their third year in high school. Sometime later at practice, Tomoe announces her withdrawal from the competition to serve the band as their manager instead. She then reveals to Kumiko that she has inflammation in her temporomandibular joints. Later, Kanade confides with Kumiko her frustration for Natsuki Nakagawa due to the latter asking her for help despite being a senior to her. On the day of the audition, Natsuki notices that Kanade is not performing seriously so she requests Mr. Taki to delay her audition. A heated argument between Kanade and Natsuki ensues, with the former stating that she is failing the audition to give way to the latter who is about to graduate. Kumiko talks through Kanade, who has revealed her experience with a senior in her middle school. The audition concludes with Kumiko, Kanade, and Natsuki passing.

The band attends a training camp presided by Mr. Taki, Masahiro Hashimoto, and Satomi Nīyama. Later at night, Kumiko and Shūichi agree to break up to focus on the band. At the Kansai band competition, alumni and former band members Kaori Nakaseko, Haruka Ogasawara, and Asuka Tanaka arrive to watch Kitauji's performance. After their performance, Kitauji High School Concert Band obtains a dud gold medal, failing to advance to the nationals. In a post-credits scene, Kanade greets Kumiko, who is now the band's president.

== Voice cast ==
Character	Japanese	English
Kumiko Ōmae	Tomoyo Kurosawa	Erica Mendez
Hazuki Katō	Ayaka Asai	Jennifer Losi
Sapphire Kawashima	Moe Toyota	Kayli Mills
Reina Kōsaka	Chika Anzai	Laura Post
Kanade Hisaishi	Sora Amamiya	Christine Marie Cabanos
Mirei Suzuki	Ayaka Nanase	Katelyn Gault
Satsuki Suzuki	Misaki Kuno	Xanthe Huynh
Motomu Tsukinaga	Shimba Tsuchiya	Lucien Dodge
Shūichi Tsukamoto	Haruki Ishiya	Christian La Monte
Natsuki Nakagawa	Konomi Fujimura	Sarah Anne Williams
Yūko Yoshikawa	Yuri Yamaoka	
Takuya Gotō	Kenjiro Tsuda	
Riko Nagase	Miyuki Kobori	
Asuka Tanaka	Minako Kotobuki	Reba Buhr
Haruka Ogasawara	Saori Hayami	
Kaori Nakaseko	Minori Chihara	
Kentarō Ōmae	Hiroshi Naka	
Akiko Ōmae	Haruhi Nanao	
Mamiko Ōmae	Manami Numakura	
Michie Matsumoto	Aya Hisakawa	
Satomi Nīyama	Houko Kuwashima	
Masahiro Hashimoto	Yuichi Nakamura	
Noboru Taki	Takahiro Sakurai	Robbie Daymond

== Production ==
In June 2017, Kyoto Animation revealed one of the two new anime films that would be directed by Tatsuya Ishihara, which would depict Kumiko Ōmae entering second year in her high school. The studio first revealed it under the title Kumiko and Company Who Became 2nd-Year Students (2年生になった久美子たち, 2-Nensei ni Natta Kumiko-tachi). The film's official title was revealed in June 2018, with the subtitle as Chikai no Fināre (誓いのフィナーレ; lit. 'Oath's Finale' or 'Oath of the Finale'). That month, Tomoyo Kurosawa was confirmed to reprise her voice role as Kumiko, while four new characters joining the Kitauji High School's concert band as first-year students were introduced: Kanade Hisaishi, Mirei Suzuki, Satsuki Suzuki, and Motomu Tsukinaga.

In September 2018, screenwriter Jukki Hanada and character designer Shoko Ikeda were revealed to be part of the staff working on the film. Additionally, Tomoyo Kurosawa, Ayaka Asai, Moe Toyota, Chika Anzai, Haruki Ishiya, Konomi Fujimura, Yuri Yamaoka, Kenjiro Tsuda, and Miyuki Kobori were set to reprise their voice roles from the anime series for the film. Additional staff were revealed in December 2018, including Mutsuo Shinohara as the art director, Hiroyuki Takahashi as the instrument designer, and Kazuya Takao as the cinematographer. That month, Minako Kotobuki and Takahiro Sakurai joined the returning cast to reprise their roles from the anime series, while the voice actors for the new characters were announced, namely Sora Amamiya as Kanade, Ayaka Nanase as Mirei, Misaki Kuno as Satzuki, and Shimba Tsuchiya as Motomu.

In May 2019, Eleven Arts licensed the film under the title Sound! Euphonium: The Movie – Our Promise: A Brand New Day. The following month, the company announced the main English dub cast for the film, namely Erica Mendez as Kumiko, Laura Post as Reina Kōsaka, Kayli Mills as Sapphire Kawashima, Jennifer Losi as Hazuki Katō, Christine Marie Cabanos as Kanade, Katelyn Gault as Mirei, Xanthe Huynh as Satsuki, and Lucien Dodge as Motomu.

== Music ==
In September 2018, Akito Matsuda was revealed to be composing Sound! Euphonium: The Movie – Our Promise: A Brand New Day. In December 2018, True was revealed as the performer of the theme song for the film. The song's title was revealed in February 2019 as "Blast!", with its single being released in Japan on April 17. The film's original soundtrack, subtitled The Endless Melody, was released in Japan on May 22, 2019, and digitally on April 4, 2022.

All music is composed by Matsuda, except where indicated.

Sound! Euphonium: The Movie – Original Soundtrack: The Endless Melody [Disc 1]
No.	Title	Music	Length
1.	"That's The Way It Is (Short - Small Composition Ver.)"	Tamio Okuda	2:00
2.	"Sound! Euphonium (Kumiko Solo Ver.)"		1:50
3.	"With a New Face"		2:52
4.	"Make a New Decision"		1:35
5.	"Slight Anxiety"		1:18
6.	"Two Who Are Worried"		1:23
7.	"Choice of Not Choosing"		1:44
8.	"Boléro"	Maurice Ravel	4:42
9.	"Samba de Loves You (Short Ver.)"	Susumu Kazuhara	2:06
10.	"Joyful Tuba (Hazuki Ver.)"		0:25
11.	"Written Feelings"		1:22
12.	"Heart and Face Draw Near"		2:17
13.	"Solitary Trumpet (Towards The Night Sky Ver.)"		0:30
14.	"Liz and the Blue Bird, Third Movement, Trumpet Solo (For Kumiko Ver.)"	Yuriko Uda; Akito Matsuda	1:54
15.	"When Placing an Instrument Gently"		1:32
16.	"If There Is No Result"		2:19
17.	"Chest Is Pierced In the Rain"		2:25
18.	"What Does It Mean to Do One's Best?"		4:25
19.	"Happy Ice Cream"		0:50
20.	"The Day Has Come"		2:10
21.	"Liz and the Blue Bird (Competition Arrangement Ver.)"	Uda; Matsuda	8:44
22.	"And So, The Next Piece Begins"		4:43
Total length:			53:06

Sound! Euphonium: The Movie – Original Soundtrack: The Endless Melody [Disc 2]
No.	Title	Music	Length
1.	"Radio Gymnastics No. 1"	Tadashi Hattori	3:09
2.	"That's The Way It Is (Full - Large Composition Ver.)"	Okuda	3:38
3.	"That's The Way It Is (Short - Large Composition Ver.)"	Okuda	2:01
4.	"Jesu, Joy of Man's Desiring (Clarinets Ver.)"	Johann Sebastian Bach	3:29
5.	"Samba de Loves You (Full Ver.)"	Kazuhara	3:54
6.	"Turandot"	Giacomo Puccini	12:44
7.	"March Sky Blue Dream"	Manabu Yato	3:11
8.	"Blast! (True & Wind Orchestra Ver.)"	Yusuke Kato	5:10
Total length:			37.16

== Marketing ==
The first key visual for Sound! Euphonium: The Movie – Our Promise: A Brand New Day was released in June 2018. It was followed with the second key visual and a teaser trailer in September 2018. The main key visual for the film was released in December 2018. Additional trailers for the film were released that month and in March 2019. The official fan book of the film was released in Japan on March 20, 2020.

Promotional partners for the film included Yamaha Music Japan, Tsutaya via the release of their membership card T Card with a design drawn by Kyoto Animation, Keihan Electric Railway, and the Japanese Red Cross Society through its blood center in Kyoto.

== Release ==
=== Theatrical ===
Sound! Euphonium: The Movie – Our Promise: A Brand New Day had early screenings at Yūrakuchō Asahi Hall in Yūrakuchō, Tokyo on April 5, 2019, and at the Movix theater in Kyoto on April 11. The film was widely released in Japan on April 19, 2019. It was previously scheduled to be released in 2018. In light of the arson attack at Kyoto Animation, Shochiku held a special screening for the films produced by the studio "to create an opportunity for people to be able to watch... works... by Kyoto Animation on the big screen"; Our Promise: A Brand New Day was screened at Movix in Kyoto on November 29, 2019.

Eleven Arts, in partnership with Fathom Events, screened the Japanese-dubbed version of the film in the United States on July 11, 2019, and the English-dubbed version on July 15. The company also screened its English-dubbed version in Canada on July 16, 2019, and the Japanese-dubbed version on July 18.

=== Home media ===
Sound! Euphonium: The Movie – Our Promise: A Brand New Day was released on Blu-ray and DVD in Japan on February 26, 2020. The film was released on AT-X on March 14, 2021, on U-Next, d Anime Store, and Bandai Channel on December 1, on Hulu Japan on February 6, 2022, on BS12 Twellv on July 10, on DMM TV on March 15, 2023, and on Amazon Prime Video in Japan on April 22.

In North America, the film was released digitally on May 19, 2020, and on Blu-ray and DVD combo pack on June 2. It was made available for streaming on Tubi on April 8, 2021, and on Crunchyroll on December 8, 2022.

== Reception ==
=== Box office ===
Sound! Euphonium: The Movie – Our Promise: A Brand New Day grossed ¥320 million in Japan. Outside Japan, the film grossed $90,341 in the United States and Canada.

The film earned ¥93,022,800 ($831,500) in its opening weekend in Japan, debuting fifth place at the box office ranking. It earned additional ¥26,945,100 ($244,500) in its second weekend and ¥16,794,400 ($153,500) in its fourth weekend.

=== Critical response ===
Kim Morrissy of Anime News Network graded Sound! Euphonium: The Movie – Our Promise: A Brand New Day "B+", criticizing the film for introducing new characters and their relationships in a limited runtime, its subplots that were "underdeveloped" and had "similar ground to the conflicts established in the first season of Sound! Euphonium", and the cathartic moments that "hinge primarily on callbacks to previous seasons" instead of letting the viewers to "connect the dots themselves and observe the changes in the characters over time." However, Morrisy lauded Kumiko Ōmae's growth and the "breathtaking" musical performance. Richard Whittaker of The Austin Chronicle gave the film 3 out of 5 stars, feeling that it was "a little unrelenting, in that it's not designed to be a standalone film, but is instead more of a continuation of the two-season anime that started it all". However, Whittaker found that the film's joy was its "earnest simplicity." Charles Solomon of the Los Angeles Times felt that the characters, such as Kumiko and Shūichi Tsukamoto, were "undeveloped" in the film. Solomon suggested that director Tatsuya Ishihara should have "devoted more time to the club members and less to the long sequences of them performing, which feels like padding."

== Sequel ==
In June 2019, Kyoto Animation greenlit an anime project in which Kumiko becomes a third-year student at Kitauji High School. The project was confirmed to be a television series in June 2022. It was revealed to be a third season in August 2023, which premiered in Japan on April 7, 2024. A theatrical version of the season, titled Sound! Euphonium: The Final Movie, was announced in March 2025. The film's first part was released in Japan on April 24, 2026.
