= Haruki Ishiya =

Japanese voice actor

- 石谷 春貴
- Born: January 14, 1992 (age 34); Miyazaki Prefecture, Japan
- Occupation: Voice actor
- Years active: 2013–present
- Agent: Office Osawa
- Height: 171.1 cm (5 ft 7 in)

Haruki Ishiya (石谷 春貴, Ishiya Haruki; born January 14, 1992) is a Japanese voice actor from Miyazaki Prefecture, Japan. He was formerly affiliated with Pro-Fit and is now with Office Osawa.

== Early life ==
In junior high school, he was invited by a friend to help with a children's theater company and became interested in acting. He was injured during his second year of high school and gave up.

== Career ==
Impressed by Hiroshi Nohara's dialogue of Crayon Shin-chan, which was broadcast during his stay in hospital, he became a full-fledged voice actor.

== Filmography ==
=== TV anime ===
2013

- Sword Art Online II, Cait Sith, Player

2014

- Magimoji Rurumo, Sugawara
- Selector Infected Wixoss, Ayumu Kominato
- Selector Spread Wixoss, Ayumu Kominato
- Wolf Girl & Black Prince, Kazuki Ueda, Couple Man

2015

- Charlotte, Male student Amamiya
- Is It Wrong to Try to Pick Up Girls in a Dungeon?, Raúl Nord, Canoe's Comrade A, Member A, Customer
- Sound! Euphonium, Shūichi Tsukamoto
- Haikyu!! Second Season, Takumi Karamatsu, Ōginishi team member
- Mobile Suit Gundam: Iron-Blooded Orphans, Chad Chadan, Child soldier

2016

- Alderamin on the Sky, Nihado Hiu
- BBK/BRNK, Yuki Nono, Student
- Sound! Euphonium 2, Shūichi Tsukamoto
- The Disastrous Life of Saiki K., Takayuki Maeda, Haruo Sugiyama, Good-looking Boy, Student B, Youth C
- Mobile Suit Gundam: Iron-Blooded Orphans Season 2, Chad Chadan
- Re:Zero − Starting Life in Another World, Villager

2017

- Akiba's Trip: The Animation, Tamotsu Denkigai
- Scum's Wish, Tatsuya Hizen, Man
- Katsugeki/Touken Ranbu, Ichimura Tetsunosuke (ep 11,13)

2018

- Rokuhōdō Yotsuiro Biyori, Ryohei Shibano
- Golden Kamuy, Mishima
- That Time I Got Reincarnated as a Slime, Rigur
- RErideD: Derrida, who leaps through time, Funt
- Banana Fish, Alex

2019

- The Price of Smiles, Pearce Thorn
- Kono Oto Tomare! Sounds of Life, Saneyasu Adachi
- Do You Love Your Mom and Her Two-Hit Multi-Target Attacks?, Masato Oosuki
- Try Knights, Shōgo Tenkawa
- Radiant Season 2, Mordred
- XL Jо̄shi, Keisuke Sudō

2020

- Seton Academy: Join the Pack!, Jin Mazama
- Interspecies Reviewers, Regular Mob A
- Hypnosis Mic: Division Rap Battle: Rhyme Anima, Jiro Yamada

2021

- Idoly Pride, Kōhei Makino
- Full Dive, Martin
- 86, Daiya Irma
- Seven Knights Revolution: Hero Successor, Pollux
- Remake Our Life!, Tsurayuki Rokuonji

2022

- Orient, Aoshi Sanada
- Salaryman's Club, Jun Yagami
- How a Realist Hero Rebuilt the Kingdom, Piltory Saracen
- Requiem of the Rose King, Anthony Woodville
- Phantom of the Idol, Yukinari Nada
- Lucifer and the Biscuit Hammer, Inachika Akitani (young)
- Eternal Boys, Chika Higashijujo

2023

- Magical Destroyers, Idol Otaku
- Rokudo's Bad Girls, Haruya Iinuma
- Saint Cecilia and Pastor Lawrence, Abel
- Hypnosis Mic: Division Rap Battle: Rhyme Anima+, Jiro Yamada

2024

- Villainess Level 99, William Ares
- Murai in Love, Hirai
- Tasūketsu: Fate of the Majority, Ikusa Garai
- I'll Become a Villainess Who Goes Down in History, Henry Williams
- 365 Days to the Wedding, Keisuke Itsuki
- Loner Life in Another World, Jock C

2025

- Mechanical Marie, Arthur
- My Friend's Little Sister Has It In for Me!, Akiteru Ōboshi
- Tougen Anki, Kaoru Namikido

2026

- I Made Friends with the Second Prettiest Girl in My Class, Maki Maehara
- Marriagetoxin, Hikaru Gero
- Pardon the Intrusion, I'm Home!, Haruma Usada
- The World Is Dancing, Jūnigorō
- Thunder 3, Kyōji Sumeragi
- The Seven Knights of the Marronnier Kingdom, Feverish
- Even Though I'm a Super Timid Noble Girl, I Accepted the Bet from My Cunning Fiancé, Henry Cox

2027

- Isshiki-san Wants to Know About Love, Danjuro Iwata
- Tsugumi Project, Dudu

=== Original net animation (ONA) ===
- Azure Striker Gunvolt (2017), Zeno
- A Herbivorous Dragon of 5,000 Years Gets Unfairly Villainized (2024), Edward (Japanese dub)
- Disney Twisted-Wonderland the Animation (2025), Sebek Zigvolt

=== Anime films ===
- The Anthem of the Heart (2015), Ryūji Fukushima
- Sound! Euphonium: The Movie – Welcome to the Kitauji High School Concert Band (2016), Shūichi Tsukamoto
- Cyborg 009: Call of Justice (2016), Cyborg 008 / Pyunma
- Sound! Euphonium: The Movie – Our Promise: A Brand New Day (2019), Shūichi Tsukamoto
- 100 Meters (2025), Kyōden

=== Video games ===
- Azure Striker Gunvolt (2014), Zeno
- Band Yaro-ze (2015), Teppei Shirayuki
- Pilgrim Saga (2015), Male Protagonist
- Prince of Stride (2015), Chikashi Aizawa, Makoto Shizuno
- MapleStory (2016), Damien
- Under Night In-Birth Exe: Late[st] (2017), Tsurugi
- The King of Fighters for Girls (2019), Billy Kane
- Namu Amida Butsu! -UTENA- (2019), Zōjōten, Kongōka Bosatsu "Uta"
- Disney: Twisted-Wonderland (2020), Sebek Zigvolt
- Fate/Grand Order (2015), Beryl Gut
- Helios Rising Heroes (2020), Ren Kisaragi
- Gate of Nightmares (2021), Balthus
- ARGONAVIS -Kimi ga Mita Stage e- (2024), Tadaomi Kurama
- 18TRIP (2024), Raito Kitakata

=== Music/Drama CD ===
- Hypnosis Mic: Division Rap Battle (2017), Jiro Yamada
