= Tatsuya Ishihara =

Japanese anime director (born 1966)

- Born: July 31, 1966 (age 60); Maizuru, Kyoto, Japan
- Occupations: Animator; director; storyboard artist
- Years active: 1987–present
- Employer: Kyoto Animation

Tatsuya Ishihara (Japanese: 石原 立也, Hepburn: Ishihara Tatsuya; born July 31, 1966) is a Japanese animator, television and film director. Working for Kyoto Animation since 1988, he has directed The Melancholy of Haruhi Suzumiya, Clannad, Nichijou, Love, Chunibyo & Other Delusions and Sound! Euphonium.

== Early life and education ==
Ishihara graduated from Osaka Designer College.

== Career ==
His first credit as an episode director was for the 1995 episode of Tenchi Universe titled "No Need for Worries!". In 2021, he replaced Yasuhiro Takemoto as the director for Miss Kobayashi's Dragon Maid S, following the latter's death during the Kyoto Animation arson attack.

== Filmography ==
=== Television ===
==== As series director ====
- Air (2005)
- Kanon (2006)
- Clannad (2007)
- Clannad After Story (2008)
- The Melancholy of Haruhi Suzumiya (2006, 2009)
- Nichijou (2011)
- Love, Chunibyo & Other Delusions (2012)
- Love, Chunibyo & Other Delusions -Heart Throb- (2014)
- Sound! Euphonium (2015)
- Myriad Colors Phantom World (2016)
- Sound! Euphonium 2 (2016)
- Miss Kobayashi's Dragon Maid S (2021)
- Sound! Euphonium 3 (2024)

==== As episode director only ====
- Tenchi Universe (1995)
- Fushigi Yûgi (1995)
- Baby & Me (1996)
- Super Milk Chan (2000)
- Inuyasha (2000–2002)
- Full Metal Panic? Fumoffu (2003)
- Lucky Star (2007)
- K-On! (2009)
- K-On!! (2010)
- Tamako Market (2013)
- Amagi Brilliant Park (2014)
- Free! – Dive to the Future (2018)

=== Film ===
- The Disappearance of Haruhi Suzumiya (as chief director, 2010)
- Sound! Euphonium: The Movie – Welcome to the Kitauji High School Concert Band (2016)
- Sound! Euphonium: The Movie – May the Melody Reach You! (as chief director, 2017)
- Love, Chunibyo & Other Delusions! Take on Me (2018)
- Sound! Euphonium: The Movie – Our Promise: A Brand New Day (2019)
- Miss Kobayashi's Dragon Maid: A Lonely Dragon Wants to Be Loved (2025)

=== Original video animation ===
- Shiawasette Naani (1991)
- Nichijou Episode 0 (2011)
- Love, Chunibyo & Other Delusions: Depth of Field – Love and Hate Theater (2012–2013)
- Sound! Euphonium: Ensemble Contest (2023)

=== Original net animation ===
- Love, Chunibyo & Other Delusions! Lite (2012)
- Love, Chunibyo & Other Delusions! Ren Lite (2013–2014)
