= Eleven Arts =

American entertainment company

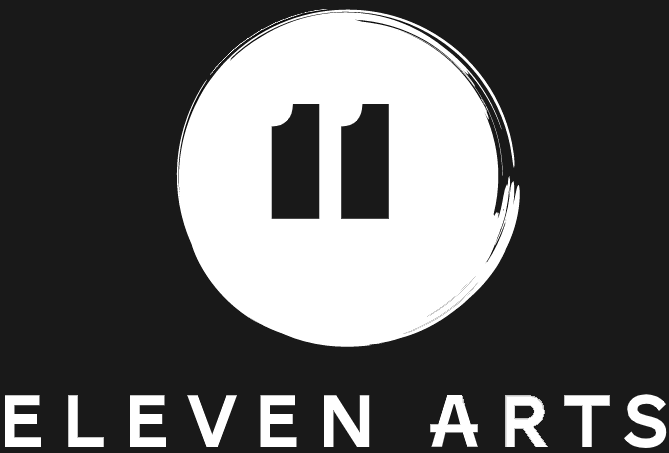
- Type: Film production, distribution, sales agent
- Industry: Entertainment
- Founded: 1997
- Founder: Ko Mori
- Headquarters: Los Angeles, California, United States
- Key people: Ko Mori (CEO)
- Website: elevenarts.net

Eleven Arts is a film production and distribution company based in Los Angeles, California. It has Japanese executives and has "a largely Japanese lineup". It specializes in importing anime from Japan to the United States.

== History ==
The company was founded by Ko Mori in 1997.

In 2008, it has been partnered with Funimation to distribute Love and Honor (2006) in the United States. It also sold Man, Woman and the Wall to TLA Releasing for distribution in the United States and United Kingdom. In 2009, Eleven Arts acquired distribution rights to Vampire Girl vs. Frankenstein Girl. In 2012, the company partnered with Edlead to produce and distribute several films a year for international audiences.

The company releases Japanese anime films on home video in the United States market, though it has struggled with sales due to the prevalence of illegal downloads. It also filed in 2013 a lawsuit against a DVD distributor for distributing inferior copies of anime films based on poor sales numbers. And in response to piracy, Eleven Arts sought to release anime films in the United States before it is released on home video in Japan. For instance, The company released Sword Art Online The Movie: Ordinal Scale in the United States three weeks after it was released in Japan.

On August 11, 2018, it was announced at Otakon 2018 that Eleven Arts had partnered with Right Stuf Inc. to become the exclusive distributor for select Eleven Arts titles on home video. On October 3, 2018, it was announced Eleven Arts and Shout! Factory had signed a distribution deal, whereby Shout! Factory would distribute Eleven Arts' titles for home video. Eleven Arts also clarified that this deal would not affect their partnership with Right Stuf.

== Filmography ==
Films distributed by Eleven Arts in North America
| Year | Film | Notes | Ref. |
|---|---|---|---|
| 2001 | Millennium Actress | | |
| 2005 | What the Snow Brings | | |
| 2006 | Love and Honor | Distributed in 2008 | |
| 2006 | Memories of Tomorrow | Distributed in 2007 | |
| 2008 | Daytime Drinking | | |
| 2009 | The Harimaya Bridge | Distributed in 2010 | |
| 2014 | The Last: Naruto the Movie | Based on Masashi Kishimoto's manga series Naruto | |
| 2015 | Boruto: Naruto the Movie | Based on Masashi Kishimoto's manga series Naruto | |
| 2017 | Haikara-San: Here Comes Miss Modern Part 1 | Based on Waki Yamato's manga series Haikara-San: Here Comes Miss Modern | |
| 2017 | Laughing Under the Clouds: Gaiden Part 3 | Based on Karakara-Kemuri's manga series Laughing Under the Clouds | |
| 2017 | A Silent Voice | Based on Yoshitoki Ōima's manga of the same name | |
| 2017 | Sword Art Online the Movie: Ordinal Scale | | |
| 2018 | Haikara-San: Here Comes Miss Modern Part 2 | Based on Waki Yamato's manga series Haikara-San: Here Comes Miss Modern | |
| 2018 | Laughing Under the Clouds: Gaiden Part 1 & 2 | Based on Based on Karakara-Kemuri's manga series Laughing Under the Clouds | |
| 2018 | Liz and the Blue Bird | | |
| 2018 | Maquia: When the Promised Flower Blooms | | |
| 2018 | Penguin Highway | Based on Tomihiko Morimi's novel | |
| 2019 | Sound! Euphonium: The Movie – Our Promise: A Brand New Day | Based on Ayano Takeda's novel series Sound! Euphonium | |
| 2019 | The Wonderland | | |
| 2020 | Poupelle of Chimney Town | | |
| 2021 | Deemo: Memorial Keys | | |
| 2021 | Gintama: The Very Final | Based on Hideaki Sorachi's manga series Gintama | |
| 2021 | The House of the Lost on the Cape | | |
| 2021 | Ryoma! The Prince of Tennis | Based on Takeshi Konomi's manga series The Prince of Tennis | |
| 2021 | Shirobako: The Movie | Sequel to Shirobako | |
| 2022 | Blue Thermal | Based on Kana Ozawa's manga series | |

Films produced by Eleven Arts
| Year | Title | Notes | Ref. |
|---|---|---|---|
| 2008 | Tokyo Gore Police | | |
| 2014 | Man from Reno | | |
| 2016 | A Bride for Rip Van Winkle | | |
| 2017 | Downrange | | |
| 2018 | Lords of Chaos | Produced by Vice Films, Insurgent, Scott Free, Kwesi Dickson, Chimney Pot | |
| 2020 | Gift of Fire | Produced by NHK | |
| 2021 | Prisoners of the Ghostland | Produced by Untitled Entertainment, Boos Boos Bang Bang, XYZ Films, Patriot Pictures | |
