= The Fairest of the Fair =

March composed by John Philip Sousa

The Fairest of the Fair
John Philip Sousa wrote "The Fairest of the Fair" in 1908. This version is performed by the United States Marine Band

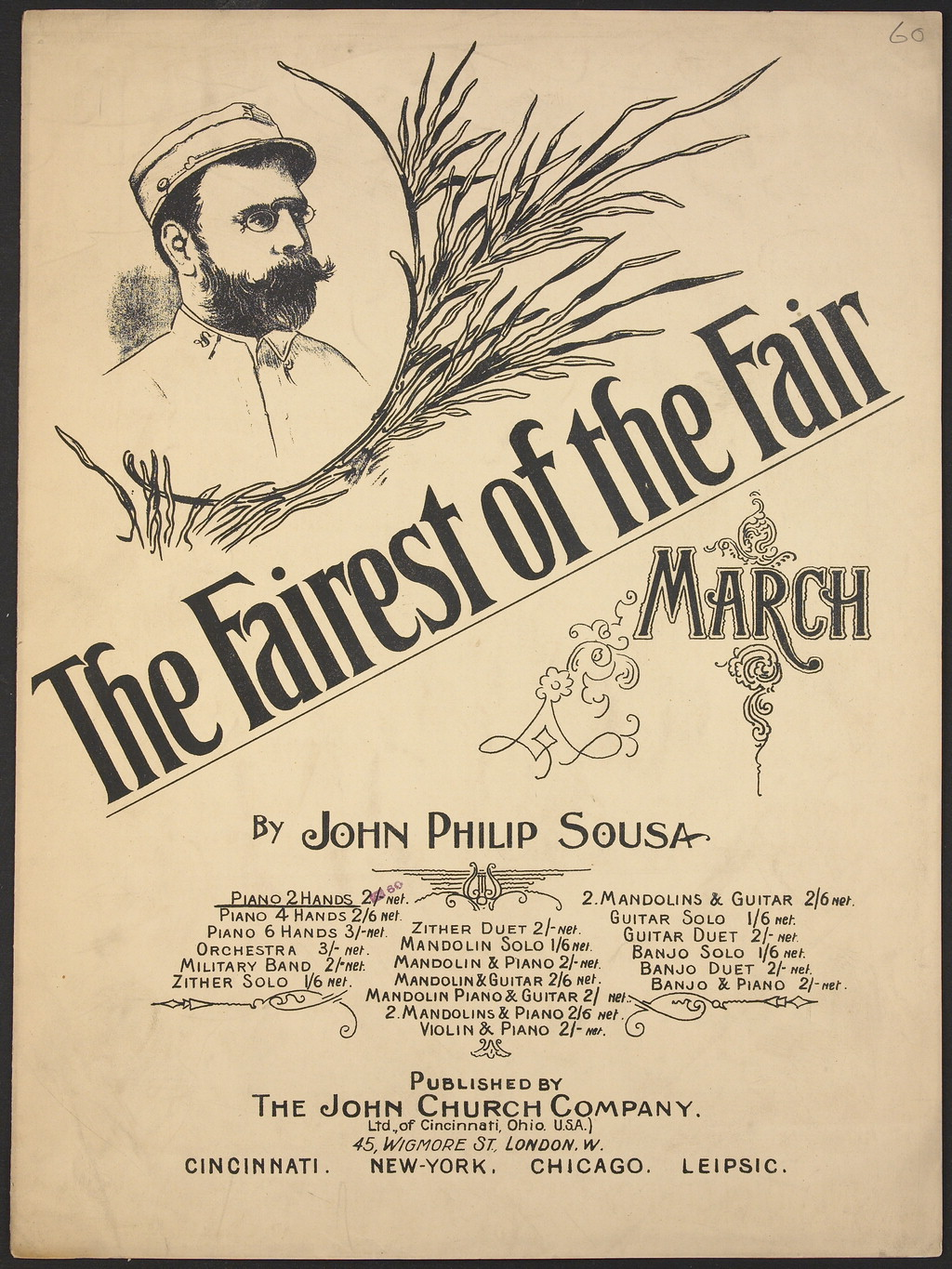
Cover page of piano transcription

"The Fairest of the Fair" is a 1908 march by John Philip Sousa. One of Sousa's more melodic, less military marches, it was composed for the annual Boston Food Fair of 1908. It is claimed that the memory of a pretty girl he had seen at an earlier fair inspired the composition.

== History ==
Sousa composed "The Fairest of the Fair" in 1908, intending the Sousa Band to perform it at the annual Boston Food Fair in the fall of that year. It is the only work of any kind that he composed that year and one of only a handful of compositions that he wrote between 1906 and 1910. He apparently completed it in New York during the summer, as the final page of the original score was signed "John Philip Sousa, Camp Comfort, Saranac Lake, Adirondack, New York, July 8, 1908."
