= Ayaka Asai =

Japanese voice actress

- 朝井 彩加
- Born: May 11, 1992 (age 34); Shizuoka Prefecture, Japan
- Occupation: Voice actress
- Years active: 2012–present
- Agent: Intention
- Height: 160 cm (5 ft 3 in)

Ayaka Asai (朝井 彩加, Asai Ayaka; born May 11, 1992) is a Japanese actress who specializes in voice acting. She is currently affiliated with Intention.

== Career ==
Asai became a member of the Seinenza Film Company on January 1, 2013. She graduated from the General Institute of Amusement Media. She voiced Okada in No Matter How I Look at It, It's You Guys' Fault I'm Not Popular!. In 2015, she voiced the title character Mio Naruse in the anime adaptation of The Testament of Sister New Devil. In 2016, she voiced Laura Sakuraba in Aikatsu Stars!. On October 1, 2017, she became a member of Toei Company's Toei Movie Studios.

== Filmography ==
=== Anime ===
List of voice performances in anime
Year	Series	Role	Notes	Source
2013	Watamote	Okada, others		
2013	Pokémon Mewtwo: Prologue to Awakening	Glaceon		
2014	Calimero	Calimero		
2014	The Fruit of Grisaia	Piano teacher		
2014	Kindaichi Case Files R	Akari Momoyama		
2014	Magic Kaito 1412	Girl A, Tour operator's sister		
2014	M3 the dark metal	Staff officer		
2014	Mushibugyo	Samurai Child A		
2014	Selector Spread WIXOSS	Girl A	Ep. 5	
2014	Wasimo	Masao		
2014	Yūto-kun Gaiku	Boy A, Woman A	Feature film	
2015	The Testament of Sister New Devil	Mio Naruse		
2015–24	Sound! Euphonium	Hazuki Katō		
2015	JoJo's Bizarre Adventure: Stardust Crusaders	Woman	Ep. 72	
2015	Onsen Yōsei Hakone-chan	Aki		
2016–18	Aikatsu Stars!	Laura Sakuraba		
2016	Maho Girls PreCure!	Yuto Namiki		
2016	JoJo's Bizarre Adventure: Diamond Is Unbreakable	Minako Okura	Ep. 108	
2017	Schoolgirl Strikers	Hina Origami		
2017	Nora, Princess, and Stray Cat	Nora Handa		
2018	Mitsuboshi Colors	Nonoka Sasaki		
2018	Golden Kamuy	Osoma		
2019	That Time I Got Reincarnated as a Slime	Kenya		
2019	Aikatsu Friends!	Mamiko Habara		
2019	Kono Oto Tomare! Sounds of Life	Mashiro		
2019	Afterlost	Sōma		
2019–23	Welcome to Demon School! Iruma-kun	Clara Valac		
2019	Kandagawa Jet Girls	Fūka Tamaki		
2019–26	Fire Force	Lisa Isaribi		
2020	Digimon Adventure: Last Evolution Kizuna	Miyako Inoue	Film	
2020	Altered Carbon: Resleeved	Holly Togram		
2020	Strike the Blood IV	Yuno Amase	OVA series	
2021	Vivy: Fluorite Eye's Song	Yui Kakitani		
2021–22	How a Realist Hero Rebuilt the Kingdom	Yuno		
2021–23	The Vampire Dies in No Time	Makoto Hagino		
2022	Black Rock Shooter: Dawn Fall	Monica Kaburagi		
2022	In the Heart of Kunoichi Tsubaki	Azami		
2022	The Eminence in Shadow	Zeta		
2022	JoJo's Bizarre Adventure: Stone Ocean	Pinocchio	Ep. 25	
2023	Junji Ito Maniac: Japanese Tales of the Macabre	Hitoshi		
2023	The Dangers in My Heart	Chihiro Kobayashi		
2023	Undead Girl Murder Farce	Alice Rapidshot		
2023	Digimon Adventure 02: The Beginning	Miyako Inoue	Film	
2023	A Playthrough of a Certain Dude's VRMMO Life	Nora		
2023	The 100 Girlfriends Who Really, Really, Really, Really, Really Love You	Kusuri Yakuzen		
2024	The Healer Who Was Banished From His Party, Is, in Fact, the Strongest	Lyra		
2026	The Warrior Princess and the Barbaric King	Vyufumec		
2026	Jaadugar: A Witch in Mongolia	Möge		
2027	Welcome to Demon School! Iruma-kun: IruMafia Edition	Clara Valac		

=== Live-action and other dubs ===
List of voice performances in other dubbing
Year	Series	Role	Notes	Source
2013	Gatchaman	Headquarters Radio Announcement	live-action version	
2014	Hostage	Sawyer		
2014	Before Midnight	Ella	theater version	
2014	CSI: Las Vegas	Miranda		
2014	Bates Motel	Lisa		
2014	Jingle All the Way	Mischievous boy		
2016	The Huntsman: Winter's War	Pippa		
2016	The Shallows	Chloe Adams		
2017	Yoga Hosers	Colleen Collette		
2019	The Passage	Amy Bellafonte		
2020	Scary Stories to Tell in the Dark	Stella Nicholls		
2021	The Broken Hearts Gallery	Amanda		
2021	The Gentlemen	Laura Pressfield		
2021	Army of Thieves	Korina Dominiguez		
2022	All of Us Are Dead	Choi Nam-ra		
2022	Jaws 2	Jackie Peters	BS Tokyo edition	
2022	Riders of Justice	Mathilde Hansen		
2022	Hard Hit	Lee Hye-in		
2024	Talk to Me	Mia		
2024	The Fall Guy	Iggy Starr		
2025	Trap	Riley		
2025	Nosferatu	Ellen Hutter		
2026	The Bad Guys 2	Pigtail Petrova	Animation	

=== Video games ===
List of voice performances in video games
Year	Title	Role	Notes	Source
2012	The Legend of Heroes: Trails from Zero Evolution			
2013	Wonderland Fantasy Township (不思議の幻想郷, Fushigi no gensō gō)	Tojiko Sogano		
2013	Venus Rampage Z (ビーナスランページZ)	Stella		
2013	Atlantica	Arlecchino		
2013	Conception 2	Lucia		
2018	Dragalia Lost	Sarisse		
2019	King's Raid	Glenwys		
2020	Kandagawa Jet Girls	Fūka Tamaki		
2021	DC Super Hero Girls: Teen Power	Catwoman / Selina Kyle		
2021	Gate of Nightmares	Valamielle		
2024	Zenless Zone Zero	Lucy		
