= List of Hyouka episodes =

The Volume 1 Blu-ray/DVD cover art for Hyouka depicting the main characters

Hyouka (氷菓) is a 22-episode animated television series based on Honobu Yonezawa's novel of the same name. It was produced by Kyoto Animation with direction by Yasuhiro Takemoto, series composition by Shoji Gatoh, character design by Futoshi Nishiya, and music composition by Kohei Tanaka. The series centers around the events which first-year high school student Houtarou Oreki faces when he joins his school's Classic Literature Club.

Hyouka aired in Japan from April to September 2012. The series was broadcast on Tokyo MX, Chiba TV, Television Saitama, Television Kanagawa, KBS Kyoto, Sun Television, Gifu Broadcasting System, Mie Television, TVQ Kyushu Broadcasting, and BS11. The first episode premiered on April 14 at a special event at Kadowaka Cinema, Shinjuku. A bonus original video animation episode was streamed online on UStream on July 8, 2012, and was later released on Blu-ray Disc with the third manga volume on January 13, 2013. Two Drama CD volumes were released by Bandai Namco Arts in August and October 2012. Kadokawa Shoten released the Blu-ray/DVD volumes of Hyouka in Japan.

Funimation (later known as Crunchyroll, LLC) has licensed the anime and released a two-part Blu-ray/DVD edition in North America in July and September 2017 with an English dub. After Crunchyroll was acquired by its parent company, the series was moved onto its streaming platform. Anime Limited released it in the United Kingdom in 2017 and 2018. In November 2021, Funimation UK relicensed the anime and released a complete series edition containing all the episodes.

The series has four pieces of theme music: two opening themes and two ending themes. The first opening theme, used for the first 11 episodes, is "Yasashisa no Riyū" (優しさの理由, Reason of Kindness) by ChouCho, and the second opening theme from episode 12 onwards is "Mikansei Stride" (未完成ストライド, Unfinished Stride) by Saori Kodama. The first ending theme, used for the first 11 episodes, is "Madoromi no Yakusoku" (まどろみの約束, Promise of Slumber), and the second ending theme from episodes 12 onwards is "Kimi ni Matsuwaru Mystery" (君にまつわるミステリー, Mystery Surrounding You); both ending themes are sung by Satomi Sato and Ai Kayano.

== Episodes ==
No.	Title	Directed by	Written by	Original release date
1	"The Return of the Time-Honored Classic Lit Club"; Transliteration: "Dentō Aru Koten-bu no Saisei" (Japanese: 伝統ある古典部の再生)	Yasuhiro Takemoto	Shoji Gatoh	April 22, 2012
At the request of his older sister, Hōtarō Oreki joins his high school's Classic Literature Club to stop it from being abolished. He meets Eru Chitanda in the club room, and after a short conversation he wonders why she was able to enter the room without a key, which he obtained earlier. They are interrupted by Satoshi Fukube, and as Hōtarō tries to leave he is stopped by Eru who wants to know how the room was locked. He then explains that the cleaner was there to lock the room with spare keys, thus hinting at an aptitude for logical deduction. The next day he tricks Eru into focusing on a made-up mystery to prevent her from dragging him to the distant Music Room and wasting his energy solving another mystery. On his way home with Satoshi, he gives an explanation for the avoided Music Room incident.
2	"The Prestigious Classic Lit Club's Activities"; Transliteration: "Meiyo Aru Koten-bu no Katsudō" (Japanese: 名誉ある古典部の活動)	Hiroko Utsumi	Shoji Gatoh	April 29, 2012
Mayaka Ibara is introduced, and Hōtarō solves another mystery regarding a book regularly borrowed from the library for a short amount of time, which is actually used by the Art Club for drawings. As they could not find the past anthologies from the Classic Literature Club in the library, Eru is disappointed because she wants to make an anthology for the upcoming Culture Festival. Hōtarō is awakened by Eru's phone call the next day, and as he meets up with her in a café, she admits to having a confession to make.
3	"The Circumstances of the Classic Lit Club's Scion"; Transliteration: "Jijō Aru Koten-bu no Matsuei" (Japanese: 事情ある古典部の末裔)	Taichi Ishidate	Katsuhiko Muramoto	May 6, 2012
Eru discusses the mystery of her uncle, whose words made her cry when she was young. She wants to remember what he said to her and what happened to him. Hōtarō agrees to help. After mid-term exams, he receives another letter from his older sister revealing the location of past anthologies from the Classic Literature Club, located in the Biology Room, now used by the News Club. Hōtarō figures out the News Club's president was smoking tobacco, and then blackmails him to get the past anthologies. As Eru is confident that she can solve her uncle's mystery from the anthologies, the very first edition of the anthology is revealed to be missing, shocking her.
4	"The Classic Lit Club's Glorious Days of Yore"; Transliteration: "Eikō Aru Koten-bu no Sekijitsu" (Japanese: 栄光ある古典部の昔日)	Eisaku Kawanami	Miyuki Egami	May 13, 2012
The club organizes a meet-up to discuss Eru's uncle's mystery. At Eru's house, each member (consisting of Eru, Hōtarō, Satoshi and Mayaka) presents their summary of research and their theories. When it is Hōtarō's turn, he asks to use the toilet, then pieces together his own theory from all of the other members' presentations. He explains that Eru's uncle and other students might have negotiated with the teachers not to cut short the period of the Culture Festival, but the price was the uncle's expulsion from the school. As the mystery is solved, all members leave, but Eru still wonders why she cried at her uncle's words.
5	"The Truth About the Historic Classic Lit Club"; Transliteration: "Rekishi Aru Koten-bu no Shinjitsu" (Japanese: 歴史ある古典部の真実)	Ichiro Miyoshi	Shoji Gatoh	May 20, 2012
Hōtarō realizes there are still holes in his theory, after a phone conversation with his sister. He then confronts the school librarian, Yōko Kōriyama, who was present at the time of the incident involving Eru's uncle. She reveals that Eru's uncle was forced into taking responsibility for the students' strike from shortening the Culture Festival and thus it was not completely of his will that he was expelled. His final wish is to name the Classic Literature Club anthologies as Hyouka, which in its translation to English reveals it to be a pun on "ice cream", since his true intention is delivering the message "I scream": telling the future Classic Literature Club members to be strong, as he is forcibly expelled from the school. Eru cries at the message, remembering that her question to her uncle on that day was of the true meaning of Hyouka. The next day, the Classic Literature Club begins planning for their anthology.
6	"Committing a Cardinal Sin"; Transliteration: "Taizai o Okasu" (Japanese: 大罪を犯す)	Kazuya Sakamoto	Maiko Nishioka	May 27, 2012
One day, while Hōtarō is in class, the class is interrupted by a commotion at another room down the hall. After his class is finished, he spends the rest of the afternoon like he usually does at the Classic Literature Club. But this time, at the club room, Mayaka is angrily reprimanding Satoshi for having missed what sounds like a date. The four club members then diverge into a philosophical and social discussion of what it means to be angry and the relevance of the Seven Deadly Sins to society and human beings. Having heard Eru's voice during the class commotion previously, Hōtarō remembers the event, and asks Eru what the commotion was about and why she got angry during the commotion. Hōtarō later figures out that the commotion was due to the class's teacher's misunderstanding, but neither Hōtarō nor Eru can figure out why Eru got angry during the commotion.
7	"Upon Seeing the True Nature"; Transliteration: "Shōtai Mitari" (Japanese: 正体見たり)	Hiroko Utsumi	Sugihiko Ashida	June 3, 2012
The four Classic Club members go on a hot spring trip, which Eru plans. They stay in an inn that belongs to Mayaka's relatives. They are greeted by Mayaka's cousins, Rie (older) and Kayo, and their family. Eru mentions that she too wishes for a sibling. After having a dip in the hot spring, Hōtarō gets dizzy and is helped back to the inn by Satoshi. Later, everyone (except Hōtarō, who is still feeling sick) starts telling ghost stories. Rie tells a story about a ghost in the inn they are staying at. The next morning, during breakfast, Mayaka and Eru claim that they saw the ghost. Hōtarō and Eru go about finding the cause, which turns out to be a yukata. While returning from another trip to the hot spring, Hōtarō explains to Eru that Kayo wore Rie's yukata to the summer festival that day, without anyone knowing, since Rie is pretty possessive about her things. And since the yukata got wet in the rain when Kayo was out, she hung the yukata to dry in the room where the rumored ghost resides, so that the rest of the family would not find out about it. Eru becomes emotional thinking that Rie would not even share her yukata with her own sister, but then, she sees Rie carrying a hurt Kayo piggy back, and Eru becomes happy again.
8	"Let's Go to the Screening"; Transliteration: "Shishakai ni Ikō!" (Japanese: 試写会に行こう!)	Noriyuki Kitanohara	Maiko Nishioka	June 10, 2012
The episode starts with Eru chatting with one of her upperclassmen. During this conversation the Classic Literature Club is invited to see a mystery production of class 2-F, whose script writer got seriously ill before she could finish the story so the murderer in the story is unknown. Hōtarō does not really feel like taking part in the detective work but in the end agrees on their playing the part of observers listening to the three amateur "detectives" of class 2-F and after that giving their opinions.
9	"The Case of the Furuoka Deserted Village Murder"; Transliteration: "Furuoka Haison Satsujin Jiken" (Japanese: 古丘廃村殺人事件)	Naoko Yamada	Shoji Gatoh	June 17, 2012
After talking with the members behind the production of the film by Fuyumi Irisu's class, other than the acting cast, Hōtarō Oreki and the other members of the Classic Literature Club listen to each production member's theory of what the ending of the unfinished film is supposed to be. Since the script-writer fell ill before the filming was complete, the group could not continue filming. To make interviewing of each member easy, Kurako Eba, one member of the class who did the film, will invite the three members one at a time. After a small introduction, each member will give their theory and reasons, thereafter Hōtarō, Satoshi, Mayaka and Eru will give their counter of agreement or objection.
10	"Blind Spot to All"; Transliteration: "Ban'nin no Shikaku" (Japanese: 万人の死角)	Kazuya Sakamoto	Shoji Gatoh	June 24, 2012
After all the theories of the amateur detectives have been dismissed, the Empress (Fuyumi Irisu) asks Hōtarō personally to solve the mystery in a way to avoid failure. He surprises all his friends by going to school during the holidays but finally comes up with a solution which satisfies almost everyone (the notable exception is the prop master). However, Mayaka's question after the test showing of the film makes him realize that he forgot to find a role for the rope that the prop master mentioned the script writer had asked him to provide but had not put to use yet in the unfinished film.
11	"Credit Roll of Fools"; Transliteration: "Gusha no Endorōru" (Japanese: 愚者のエンドロール)	Eisaku Kawanami	Maiko Nishioka	July 1, 2012
After the other two members (Satoshi and Eru) of the club also state why they think the ending created by Hōtarō is not the one Hongou, the original script writer, wanted, he starts a new round of thinking and reevaluates the facts in a broader perspective than the original video he used when thinking about his first ending. As a result, he is irritated by the fact that the Empress made a fool of him and she was pulling the strings in the background to make everyone serve her purposes. In the last scene, he shares his views on what Hongou probably wanted with Eru, who is happy with that solution because she feels that neither she nor Hongou like stories where someone dies.
12	"Those Things Piled Up Endlessly"; Transliteration: "Kagiri-naku Tsumareta Rei no Are" (Japanese: 限りなく積まれた例のあれ)	Taichi Ogawa	Katsuhiko Muramoto	July 8, 2012
The Kan'ya Festival is approaching, and all four members of the Classic Literature Club are unable to sleep from the anticipation of this festival. Hōtarō greets his sister in the morning, who says that it is a tradition for the Classic Literature Club to always face some kind of trouble during the festival. She gives him a broken fountain pen before he leaves. The Classic Literature Club meets before the starting ceremony to fix one problem; Mayaka was supposed to order 30 copies of their anthology, but they end up with 200 instead. The club comes up with the plan to first convince the Student Council to move their inconveniently placed club to a new stall, and also to advertise their club by entering various contests under the club's name.
13	"A Corpse By Evening"; Transliteration: "Yūbe ni wa Mukuro ni" (Japanese: 夕べには骸に)	Noriyuki Kitanohara	Miyuki Egami	July 15, 2012
During the Kan'ya Festival, Satoshi participates in a quiz contest with the intention of advertising Hyouka. Satoshi makes it to the final four and runs into an acquaintance, Tani, from the Go Club, who tells him some Go stones were stolen. Meanwhile, various clubs report that various small things have been stolen from them as well, and that at each crime scene, there is a note left by the culprit, known only as "Jūmonji" ("十文字").
14	"Wild Fire"; Transliteration: "Wairudo Faia" (Japanese: ワイルド・ファイア)	Naoko Yamada	Katsuhiko Muramoto	July 22, 2012
Satoshi, Eru and Mayaka plan to enter their next contest, the Cooking Contest, as part of their plan to advertise the Classic Literature Club. However, Mayaka is forced to finish advertisements for the Manga Research Society before she can go to the competition, forcing Eru and Satoshi to cover the first two parts of the competition. Satoshi does reasonably, and Eru does excellently, but Eru accidentally uses most of the allotted ingredients. When Mayaka arrives late to do her part of the competition, she finds that she does not have enough ingredients to make any dishes. However, Hōtarō calls Satoshi over to give the team a bag of flour, which he received in a trade for an anthology sale. With the rules permitting outside ingredients to be brought in, this last ingredient allows Mayaka to cook a dish just in time. While Mayaka is cooking, however, she finds that the ladle at her station is missing. The members of the Cooking Society give her another one, but Eru later discovers that a note is left at the station, signifying that the mysterious thief has struck again.
15	"The Juumonji Affair"; Transliteration: "Jūmonji Jiken" (Japanese: 十文字事件)	Hiroko Utsumi	Shoji Gatoh	July 29, 2012
The Classic Literature Club come up with the idea to catch the "Jūmonji" (十文字) thief by using Hōtarō's skills. Doing so will advertise the Classic Literature Club even further. Hōtarō quickly figures out that the clubs affected by the thefts have been in alphabetical order (gojūon). They also suspect that the items stolen also follow an alphabetical order. Finally, Hōtarō tells the group to stop reading "十文字" as a student's surname ("Jūmonji"); doing so reveals that "十文字" actually stands for "ten letters" ("jū moji"). Following this order reveals that the Club might be targeted last.
16	"The Final Target"; Transliteration: "Saigo no Hyōteki" (Japanese: 最後の標的)	Kazuya Sakamoto	Maiko Nishioka	August 5, 2012
As more people realize that the thefts are following the gojūon order, a lot of amateur detectives gather early in the morning in front of the Global Acting Club (グローバルアクトクラブ, Gurōbaru Akuto Kurabu). No one thinks of the Quiz Research Society (クイズ研究会, Kuizu Kenkyūkai) as a likely target, as its event is already over. In the end, it turns out that "ku" (く) was skipped and the Light Music Club (軽音楽部, Keiongaku-bu), its name starting with "ke" (け), is targeted instead. Hōtarō's sister, fulfilling her earlier promise, visits the Cultural Festival on its last day and exchanges Mayaka's mirror for the manga A Corpse by Evening (夕べには骸に, Yūbe ni wa Mukuro ni), a copy of which Mayaka was looking for in vain in her home earlier. To everyone's surprise in the club, he finds the manga fascinating and cannot put it down until he is finished reading it. It gives him some clues to the solution of the "Jūmoji" mystery, but the picture is still not clear. He asks for some help from Satoshi, but Hōtarō still has some things to figure out. In the meantime, Eru gets five minutes of air time on the school radio.
17	"The Kudryavka Sequence"; Transliteration: "Kudoryafuka no Junban" (Japanese: クドリャフカの順番)	Taichi Ishidate	Shoji Gatoh	August 12, 2012
Eru finishes her talk on the school radio but has misgivings about whether she was doing the right thing. Later, she admits to the Empress, after Fuyumi gives the same advice to her, that following the Empress's example in manipulating people is not for her. Her radio talk however sets the events into motion and the room of the Classics Club gets filled with students, expecting to help prevent the last strike of Jūmoji. Volumes of the Hyouka sell fast. However, they are apparently unsuccessful in protecting the manuscript of Hyouka, which catches fire and a note from Jūmoji appears in a printed copy of Hyouka. Mayaka has some suspicions because she sees water on the table where the manuscript was and she notices that Satoshi is strangely silent and irritated about the events. It turns out that Hōtarō was not only an investigator in this case. Hotaro knew that the school president and vice president were involved in doing this after reading a manga named "A Corpse By Evening".
18	"Is the Mountain Range Clear?"; Transliteration: "Renpō wa Harete Iru ka" (Japanese: 連峰は晴れているか)	Noriyuki Kitanohara	Sugihiko Ashida	August 19, 2012
Hōtarō, to the Classic Literature Club's surprise and concern, becomes interested in his past teacher's changed feeling towards helicopters and his apparent survival of three lightning strikes. Eru is curious about Hōtarō's interest and tags along with him to do some research at the city library. Hōtarō remembers his sister telling him that the weather across the mountains is quite different from that of the city, meaning that the lightning story is plausible, though unlikely. He then confirms through newspaper articles that his teacher often climbed the mountains and learns of an incident involving stranded mountaineers. He concludes that his teacher was checking for police helicopters to see whether a rescue had been completed. Hōtarō then says that he investigated the mystery to be considerate of the teacher's true feelings. Eru is stunned by what Hōtarō had said, but is unable to put her feelings into words. The mystery solved, Eru returns home. Hōtarō thinks about how Eru inconvenienced herself to help him out of her free will, and says to himself that he owes her for that.
19	"Does Anyone Have Any Idea?"; Transliteration: "Kokoroatari no Aru Mono wa" (Japanese: 心あたりのある者は)	Taichi Ogawa	Miyuki Egami	August 26, 2012
Hōtarō challenges Eru to come up with a random mystery for him to solve in order to prove that a theory can be created out of anything and that Eru can't rely on Hōtarō about everything she ponders. After its announced on the school's intercom, Eru settles on having Hōtarō figure out why students who went to a local stationery store are being called into the staff room. Much to Hōtarō's discomfort, Eru takes the "game" too seriously, and she becomes dissatisfied with the results. Remembering a news flyer posted on a bulletin board in the school, Hōtarō deduces that students are being called to the staff room in order to help authorities find the source of a counterfeit 10,000 yen bill given to the clerks at the stationery store. The theory seems perfect, and Eru is impressed and speechless. However, both she and Hōtarō forget why they came up with the game in the first place. The next morning, Hōtarō sees in the newspaper that the culprits of the counterfeiting scheme have been apprehended, confirming the accuracy of Hōtarō's mock theory.
20	"Mishap-py New Year"; Transliteration: "Akimashite Omedetō" (Japanese: あきましておめでとう)	Rika Ōta	Miyuki Egami	September 2, 2012
Eru asks Hōtarō to accompany her to the Arekusu Shrine for New Year's Eve, mentioning that Satoshi and Mayaka would be there and that she planned on showing off her kimono. After arriving, Mayaka, who is working at the lost and found station, gives Eru and Hōtarō fortunes. Mayaka tells them that Satoshi went home for a while to watch a period drama (which Hōtarō had watched earlier in the day). Eru and Hōtarō volunteer to retrieve sake lees from the shrine warehouse, but the pair mistakenly search a shed instead and are locked in from the outside. Since she is representing her father and the regulars at the shrine would recognize her, Eru requests that Hōtarō not call for help, as someone could get the wrong idea from their situation. Braving the cold, Hōtarō drops Eru's handkerchief out of the shed in hopes that it will reach Mayaka. It does reach her, but Mayaka is distracted by Satoshi's return. Remembering that Satoshi had watched the same drama he had, Hōtarō throws out Eru's purse. Mayaka recognizes it and shows Satoshi, who immediately spots the string that Hōtarō had tied around it–a signal from the drama that its "contents are trapped". Satoshi rushes to the shed and rescues them.
21	"The Case of the Homemade Chocolates"; Transliteration: "Tezukuri Chokorēto Jiken" (Japanese: 手作りチョコレート事件)	Hiroko Utsumi	Maiko Nishioka	September 9, 2012
During Valentine's Day of their last year of junior high, Mayaka's attempt to get Satoshi to accept her feelings fails, which Satoshi refuses to receive her chocolate, criticizing the quality of the chocolate she made. This year, she asks for Eru's help to make an even better chocolate than the last. Meanwhile, Hōtarō runs into Satoshi at a city arcade, and contemplates the fact that Satoshi seems to have lost his competitiveness from the year before. Mayaka leaves the chocolate she made in the clubroom with Eru, but it disappears after she leaves the room. Hōtarō attempts to figure out who would have stolen it, but he already has an idea. Mayaka is discouraged by the loss of the chocolate and goes home; Eru runs after her. Hōtarō confronts Satoshi about hiding the chocolate. Satoshi explains that, though he does want to be with Mayaka, he had stopped becoming obsessed with everything, and could not risk becoming obsessed with her. Mayaka later reveals to Eru that she knew Satoshi had taken it and that he was afraid of giving her an answer. Later that night, Eru thanks Hōtarō for his help, and Satoshi calls Mayaka, telling her that he has something to speak to her about.
22	"The Doll That Took the Long Way Around"; Transliteration: "Tōmawari Suru Hina" (Japanese: 遠まわりする雛)	Yasuhiro Takemoto; Taichi Ishidate	Shoji Gatoh	September 16, 2012
Eru asks Hōtarō to be an umbrella carrier for her during this year's Hina Doll Festival. He is stopped on the way by impending construction on a small bridge, though the worker lets him go through. When Hōtarō confirms that the nearby bridge is under construction, the staff is distraught; the procession was to walk over that bridge. A young man with brown hair suggests that they pass through the next bridge and the ceremony begins. Outside, Fuyumi Irisu is revealed to be the Emperor, and Eru appears next to her. Hōtarō is caught off-guard by her full garb and extensive make-up, and is distracted during the procession, thinking to himself that he is curious and wants to see her face again. At the end of the day, Eru wonders aloud to Hōtarō who allowed the bridge construction to take place. Both of them decide that it was the young man with brown hair, who Eru remembers was interested in photography, and he might have wanted to have a better shot from his new angle. As Eru and Hōtarō walk home, she tells him that she decided to take science classes to help discover ways to help grow crops more efficiently. Eru explains that she does not see much potential for growth in the town, but says that no matter what, she would always return to it, and says that she had wanted Hōtarō to see that part of her. Hōtarō begins to tell her that he would help her with her dream, but stops instead and comments on the weather being cold. Eru happily exclaims that spring has arrived, and the wind blows through the nearby cherry blossom trees.

=== OVA ===
No.	Title	Directed by	Written by	Original release date
11.5	"What Should Be Had"; Transliteration: "Motsu beki Mono wa" (Japanese: 持つべきものは)	Rika Ōta	Yasuhiro Takemoto	July 8, 2012
It is a "pleasant" and hot summer morning for Hōtarō as he wakes up and goes downstairs to start his day. He is greeted by the running of a shower which whom he suspects is occupied by his sister, Tomoe Oreki, finally home from her travels. His suspicion was correct and he is offered a job at Tomoe's university as a lifeguard, in which she promises that he will do almost nothing. Oreki willingly accepts.

== Drama CD ==
Two Drama CD volumes were released by Bandai Namco Arts. The first volume was released on August 22, 2012, and the second volume was released on October 10, 2012.

=== Volume 1 ===
No.	Title
1	"Chunibyo-like 4 noble families" Transliteration: "Chuu Ni Byou Teki Yonmeika" (中二病的四名家)
2	"Irisu Senpai, There Is Something To Talk About:1"; Transliteration: "Irisu Senpai. Ohanashi Ga Arimasu:1" (入須先輩、お話があります:1)
3	"If Houtarou and Satoshi Were a Convenience Store Worker (First-Half)"; Transliteration: "Moshi Houtarou To Satoshi Ga Conveni Tenin Dattara" (もし奉太郎と里志がコンビニ店員だったら (前半))
4	"Irisu Senpai, There Is Something To Talk About:2"; Transliteration: "Irisu Senpai. Ohanashi Ga Arimasu:2" (入須先輩、お話があります:2)
5	"World Hyouka Theater Cinderella"; Transliteration: "Sekai Hyouka Gekijou Shinderera" (世界氷菓劇場 シンデレラ)
6	"Irisu Senpai, There Is Something To Talk About:3"; Transliteration: "Irisu Senpai. Ohanashi Ga Arimasu:3" (入須先輩、お話があります:3)
7	"A Letter From Older Sister"; Transliteration: "Aneki Kara No Tegami" (姉貴からの手紙)

=== Volume 2 ===
No.	Title
1	"Anjou San's Amazing Original"; Transliteration: "Anjou San No Monosugoi Gensaku" (安城さんのものすごい原作)
2	"If Houtarou and Satoshi Were a Convenience Store Worker (Second-Half)"; Transliteration: "Moshi Houtarou To Satoshi Ga Conveni Tenin Dattara" (もし奉太郎と里志がコンビニ店員だったら (後半))
3	"Manga Club's Stubborn Person"; Transliteration: "Manken no Gankomono" (漫研の頑固者)
4	"Hyouka Quest And Then To The Classics Club..."; Transliteration: "Hyouka Kuesuto Soshito Kotenbu-he..." (氷菓クエストそして古典部へ...)
5	"Prepare Something That Starts With [Ko]"; Transliteration: "[Ko]No Tsuku Mono Wo Youi Shiro" (『コ』のつくものを用意しろ)
6	"The Banquet"; Transliteration: "Ohirome Kai" (お披露目会)

== Home video releases ==
=== Japanese-language releases ===
Kadokawa Shoten
Vol.	Episodes	Release date	References
1	1–2	June 29, 2012	
2	3–4	July 27, 2012	
3	5–6	August 31, 2012	
4	7–8	September 28, 2012	
5	9–10	October 26, 2012	
6	11–12	November 30, 2012	
7	13–14	December 28, 2012	
8	15–16	January 25, 2013	
9	17–18	February 22, 2013	
10	19–20	March 29, 2013	
11	21–22	April 26, 2013	
BD Box	1–22 (+OVA)	February 27, 2015	

=== English-language releases ===
Funimation
Vol.	Episodes	Release date	References
1	1–11 (+OVA)	July 4, 2017	
2	12–22	September 26, 2017	

Anime Limited
Vol.	Episodes	Release date	References
1	1–11 (+OVA)	December 4, 2017	
2	12–22	June 25, 2018	

Funimation UK
Vol.	Episodes	Release date	References
Complete Series	1–22 (+OVA)	November 22, 2021	
