= List of Sound! Euphonium episodes =

Sound! Euphonium is an anime television series adaptation of the novel series of the same name by Ayano Takeda. The first season is directed by Tatsuya Ishihara, written by Jukki Hanada, and produced by Kyoto Animation. It aired in Japan between April 8 and July 1, 2015. Naoko Yamada served as series production director. The opening theme song is "Dream Solister" performed by True, while the ending theme song is "Tutti!" (トゥッティ!) performed by Tomoyo Kurosawa, Ayaka Asai, Moe Toyota, and Chika Anzai. The ending theme for episode 8 is a trumpet and euphonium duet version of "Ai o Mitsuketa Basho" (愛を見つけた場所; lit. 'The Place Where We Found Love') and the ending theme for episode 13 is a wind orchestra version of "Dream Solister". The anime is licensed by Ponycan USA in North America, and by Anime Limited in the United Kingdom. The seventh home media volume, released on December 16, 2015, bundled an original video animation (OVA) episode titled "Kakedasu Monaka" (かけだすモナカ; lit. 'Ready, Set, Monaka'). Kyoto Animation produced an anime film retelling the events of the television series, which premiered on April 23, 2016.

A second season of the television series began airing on October 6, 2016. The opening theme song is "Soundscape" (サウンドスケープ, Saundosukēpu) performed by True, while the ending theme song is "Vivace!" (ヴィヴァーチェ!, Vivāche!) performed by Kurosawa, Asai, Toyota, and Anzai. The ending theme song for episode 9 is a euphonium solo version of "Sound! Euphonium" (響け! ユーフォニアム, Hibike! Yūfoniamu) (uncredited) and the ending theme for episode 13 is an orchestra version of "Sound! Euphonium". A short anime, titled "Hanabi-taikai Kiss e Yōkoso" (花火大会キッスへようこそ！; lit. 'Welcome to the Fireworks Festival Kiss'), was bundled with the second season's first home video release volume, which was released on December 21, 2016. A second anime film retelling the events of the second season was released on September 30, 2017.

A new anime project was announced in 2019, focusing on Kumiko as a student in her third year. It was later revealed to be a third season that premiered on April 7, 2024, on NHK Educational TV. The opening theme song for the third season is "ReCoda" performed by True. Along with re-confirmation of the third season, the theatrical OVA Sound! Euphonium: Ensemble Contest was announced in 2022, and was released on August 4, 2023. Tatsuya Ishihara returned to direct the OVA, with Taichi Ogawa serving as assistant director, Jukki Hanada writing the screenplay, Shoko Ikeda being posthumously credited for the character designs, and Akito Matsuda composing the music. The theme song for the OVA is "Ensemble" performed by True.

== Series overview ==
Season	Episodes	Originally released	
Season	Episodes	First released	Last released
1	13	April 8, 2015	July 1, 2015
2	13	October 6, 2016	December 28, 2016
3	13	April 7, 2024	June 30, 2024

== Episodes ==
=== Season 1 (2015) ===
No. overall	No. in season	Title	Directed by	Animation directed by	Original release date
1	1	"Welcome to High School"; Transliteration: "Yōkoso Hai Sukūru" (Japanese: ようこそハイスクール)	Naoko Yamada	Seiichi Akitake	April 8, 2015
Euphonium player Kumiko Oumae inadvertently creates a rift with trumpeter and fellow band member Reina Kousaka upon losing their final concert band competition in junior high. On the first day of high school, she befriends classmates Hazuki Katou and Sapphire "Midori" Kawashima. Midori, who used to play the double bass, suggests that the three go check out the Kitauji concert band club. As they are being greeted by club president Haruka Ogasawara and vice president Asuka Tanaka, Kumiko is shocked to meet Reina again as the latter goes to join the band. While struggling to come to terms with her earlier surprise meeting with Reina, Kumiko runs into childhood friend Shuichi Tsukamoto on the way home, who also tells her of his intentions to join. Though initially unsure, with encouragement from Midori and Hazuki (who has just bought a mouthpiece), Kumiko decides to finally join the band the next day.
2	2	"Nice to Meet You, Euphonium"; Transliteration: "Yoroshiku Yūfoniamu" (Japanese: よろしくユーフォニアム)	Tatsuya Ishihara	Kayo Hikiyama	April 15, 2015
Despite several attempts to break the ice, Kumiko remains unable to talk to Reina. After school, Haruka announces that it is time to assign instruments to the new club members. Due to the lack of contrabass players, Midori is automatically assigned the double bass given her previous experience playing at a prestigious school; similarly, Reina joins the trumpet section after an impressive performance to section leader Kaori Nakaseko. Hazuki selects the tuba after successfully fitting her mouthpiece to one. Kumiko, who wants to try a different instrument in high school, initially avoids the bass section; unfortunately, she is scouted by section leader Asuka after Aoi Saitou, an old friend of Kumiko, reveals that she has been playing euphonium since elementary school. The next day, the club meets their new advisor Noboru Taki, who asks the members to decide on their goal for the year. Though Kumiko is unsure of what she wants, the club overwhelmingly votes to work towards winning nationals in the upcoming concert band competition.
3	3	"The First Ensemble"; Transliteration: "Hajimete Ansanburu" (Japanese: はじめてアンサンブル)	Takuya Yamamura	Kazumi Ikeda	April 22, 2015
The band begins sectional practice as the new members select their instruments and are taught the basics. Hazuki decides to name her new tuba "Tubacabura" after seeing Midori name her bass "George". Mr. Taki instructs the band to let him know once they are good enough to perform in an ensemble; however, many sections neglect to take their practice seriously, preferring instead to focus on the upcoming Sunrise Festival, an important event that the concert band has traditionally performed at. Midori's question regarding the lack of second-year students is met with uncomfortable silences from the other upperclassmen in the section. The club's first performance as an ensemble goes poorly; Mr. Taki warns the club that unless they improve in a week, they should not even think about performing at SunFes, much less nationals. As dissent towards Mr. Taki grows in the club, practice is cancelled while the section leaders discuss what to do. Reina, frustrated at the turn of events, yells out at the top of her lungs after playing a trumpet solo outside school, much to Kumiko's surprise.
4	4	"Singing Solfège"; Transliteration: "Utau yo Sorufēju" (Japanese: うたうよソルフェージュ)	Directed by : Ai Yukimura; Storyboarded by : Tatsuya Ishihara & Naoko Yamada	Chiyoko Ueno	April 29, 2015
Despite still having reservations about Mr. Taki, the club decides to practice for their second ensemble. Mr. Taki engages the club in a variety of drills: having them run around the school and play their instruments, engaging the students in breathing exercises, and finally working with each section individually. Kumiko and Hazuki overhear his strict treatment of the flute section, but is later surprised by his gentle demeanor while working with him in the bass section. On the way home, Kumiko again runs into Shuichi, who tells her that it is Mr. Taki's first time advising a concert band. Reina, overhearing them, adamantly defends Mr. Taki, much to the surprise of Kumiko and Shuichi. At school the next day, Kumiko awkwardly apologizes to Reina while also thanking her for having inspired her; she leaves in a hurry but expresses relief at finally being able to talk to Reina. On the day of the ensemble, the band's performance meets Mr. Taki's standards; he responds by affirming his commitment to the band's goals of performing in SunFes and making nationals.
5	5	"Festival Time"; Transliteration: "Tadaima Fesutibaru" (Japanese: ただいまフェスティバル)	Yoshiji Kigami	Nobuaki Maruki	May 6, 2015
The band prepares for its upcoming performance at SunFes as uniforms are handed out and the students are drilled on how to march in unison. Natsuki Nakagawa, a second-year in the bass section, reveals to Kumiko and Hazuki that Haruka is only president because Asuka, despite her more outgoing personality, had passed up on it. The band now has confidence in Mr. Taki, even agreeing to extra practice time after school. Aoi leaves early however, telling Kumiko that she has cram school. On the way home, Kumiko is surprised to run into Reina. While trying to make small talk, Kumiko unintentionally expresses her doubt at their chances of making nationals, quickly taking it back. Afraid of offending Reina again, she is surprised to see her smile in response. On the day of the festival, Kumiko runs into an old friend from junior high who reveals that Reina actually turned down an invitation from Rikka, a prestigious school, to go to Kitauji. Despite having to go after Rikka, the band's performance earns them notice from the crowd.
6	6	"Twinkle, Twinkle, Little Tuba"; Transliteration: "Kirakira Tuba" (Japanese: きらきらチューバ)	Eisaku Kawanami	Kayo Hikiyama	May 13, 2015
Mr. Taki reveals that he intends on holding auditions for the upcoming competition, much to everyone's surprise. There is consternation in the band at the prospect of seniors not being able to play, causing Kumiko to recall an unpleasant memory from junior high. Meanwhile, the band learns what pieces they will be performing for the audition, as even the normally laid-back Natsuki begins to practice. Asuka attempts to motivate Hazuki, who expresses doubt at being able to make the cut as a beginner. After trying different ways to help her, Kumiko realizes that Hazuki has never had the chance to play her tuba with others in ensemble. Together with Midori, the three play "Twinkle, Twinkle, Little Star", much to Hazuki's delight. As Hazuki is carrying her tuba home, she trips, but is fortuitously caught by Shuichi. Aoi, seeing Kumiko practicing with her euphonium, wishes her luck at the audition.
7	7	"Crybaby Saxophone"; Transliteration: "Naki Mushi Sakusofon" (Japanese: なきむしサクソフォン)	Yasuhiro Takemoto	Futoshi Nishiya	May 20, 2015
As practice continues for the upcoming audition, Aoi still insists on leaving early for cram school, causing Haruka to worry. During an ensemble, Aoi is singled out for her performance; when asked by Mr. Taki when she will be able to play the part, Aoi stuns the club by announcing her sudden decision to quit, citing conflict with her studies. Kumiko tries to run after Aoi, but is overtaken by Haruka. Aoi explains the real reason she quit: having been unable to convince the other members not to quit the previous year, she would not let herself go to nationals this year. Haruka blames herself for not being able to convince Aoi to stay and doubts her ability to lead the club, staying home from school the next day. Asuka temporarily takes charge, revealing her cold demeanor and uncompromising personality. After school, Kaori stops by Haruka's house to try to cheer her up, reminding her that she alone had the courage to take over leadership of the club, even when Asuka couldn't. The next day, Haruka returns to the applause of everyone in the club. During lunch, Hazuki suddenly asks Kumiko whether or not she is going out with Shuichi, leaving her stunned.
8	8	"Festival Triangle"; Transliteration: "Omatsuri Toraianguru" (Japanese: おまつりトライアングル)	Haruka Fujita	Seiichi Akitake	May 27, 2015
Kumiko vehemently denies being romantically involved with Shuichi, much to the relief of both Hazuki and Midori. On their way home from school, Shuichi asks a shocked Kumiko to go to the Agata Festival with him, to which she does not reply. During practice, Kumiko's attempts to ignore Shuichi fail when he misinterprets her actions as a signal to speak privately; Kumiko's attempt to deflect his invitation inadvertently causes her to ask Reina to go with her instead. With Kumiko's encouragement, Hazuki asks Shuichi to go with her. At the festival, Hazuki confesses her feelings but is rejected. Meanwhile, Reina invites Kumiko to hike with her to several shrines overlooking the city, avoiding the festival altogether. Reina divulges her interest in spending more time with Kumiko, stating that she finds Kumiko's true personality—nothing like the "nice girl" she presents herself as—attractive. Reina reveals that she has no interest in fitting in, but rather wants to be something special, which is why she plays the trumpet. The day ends with the two of them playing a piece from their middle school concert band repertoire atop the mountain, leading into the day of the auditions.
9	9	"Please, Audition"; Transliteration: "Onegai Ōdishon" (Japanese: おねがいオーディション)	Noriyuki Kitanohara	Rie Sezaki	June 3, 2015
Midori feels guilt over having pushed Hazuki into confessing, blaming herself for her friend's rejection. Asuka criticizes the noticeable drop in Midori's performance during practice, and declares bluntly that she has no interest in personal matters unrelated to band. Hazuki confronts Kumiko regarding the latter's feelings for Shuichi, but Kumiko continues to frantically deny having such feelings. At home, Kumiko's older sister reveals to her that Mr. Taki is actually the son of a famous music instructor. Meanwhile, Kaori expresses her desire to play the trumpet solo to Haruka, followed by a tense encounter with a practicing Reina. On the day of the auditions, Kumiko sees everyone practicing furiously, including Natsuki. She hesitates when she realizes that she is now competing against her bandmates, not wanting to deny someone a chance to play, but Reina encourages her, telling her she has to do her best. Kumiko's audition passes without incident, but as the results are later announced, the pain of failing to make the cut is clearly evident among the band members, with some bursting into tears; among those out are Natsuki and Hazuki. All eyes are on Reina as she is selected as the soloist over the crowd favorite Kaori, much to everyone's shock.
10	10	"Straight Trumpet"; Transliteration: "Massugu Toranpetto" (Japanese: まっすぐトランペット)	Takuya Yamamura	Kazumi Ikeda & Seiichi Akitake	June 10, 2015
Despite not making the cut, Natsuki remains in surprisingly good spirits and expresses her wish to play again next year, much to Kumiko's relief. Upon discovering that Mr. Taki had known Reina prior to their meeting at Kitauji, Yuko Yoshikawa, a second-year trumpet player who idolizes Kaori, publicly accuses him of playing favorites in the auditions. Reina angrily rebukes her, defending Taki's honor and saying that she was chosen for the simple reason that she is the superior musician, which enrages Yuko. Natsuki and Kaori are ultimately forced to separate the two. Later, Reina confides to Kumiko that she chose Kitauji over other schools because of Mr. Taki and that she loves him, much to Kumiko's surprise. As the rumor that Mr. Taki held the auditions as a pretense to give Reina the solo begins to spread, the collective mood of the band begins to drop. In response, Mr. Taki announces that he will hold a second round of auditions for anyone who is interested in appealing the results of the first audition, with performances being judged by a vote from the band members. Kaori asks to redo the audition for the solo part, meaning Reina will have to redo her audition as well.
11	11	"Welcome Back, Audition"; Transliteration: "Okaeri Ōdishon" (Japanese: おかえりオーディション)	Ai Yukimura	Chiyoko Ueno	June 17, 2015
After hearing Reina practice for the audition, Yuko is shocked at her playing ability, privately conceding to Kumiko that Reina is fit to play the solo. Meanwhile, Kaori attempts to gauge Asuka's opinion regarding her playing. Though Asuka remains evasive in her answers, Kaori decides that she would rather not know instead. The next day, Yuko confronts Reina and begs her to throw the audition for Kaori's sake, who, as a senior, will not have the chance to play again. Reina, defiant as ever, declares that Kaori's circumstances have nothing to do with her and leaves. Before the audition, Haruka goes to see Kaori when Asuka refuses to; likewise, Kumiko visits Reina, who questions whether or not she should give Kaori the solo, and reminds the latter that to become something special, she must win. At the audition, Kaori plays first, but as Reina finishes her performance, it is clear to the band that Reina is the better soloist. However, when asked to decide by Mr. Taki, nearly everyone abstains from voting; Yuko and Haruka vote for Kaori, while Kumiko and Hazuki vote for Reina. Faced with a tie, Mr. Taki asks Kaori if she is willing to play the solo, but, having heard Reina's performance, Kaori declines.
12	12	"My Euphonium"; Transliteration: "Watashi no Yūfoniamu" (Japanese: わたしのユーフォニアム)	Yoshiji Kigami	Nobuaki Maruki	June 24, 2015
Mr. Taki asks the euphoniums to play an additional section. While Asuka is quick to learn the part, Kumiko finds herself struggling to master the piece despite relentless practice. During an ensemble, Mr. Taki asks whether or not she will be ready by the competition; Kumiko confidently declares to him that she will. Encouraged by Reina and other members of the bass section, Kumiko continues to practice the part. However, during a critique of the band's performance, Mr. Taki suddenly asks Asuka to play the part solo, leaving Kumiko shocked and depressed. Attempting to cheer her up, Hazuki and Midori invite Kumiko out to eat, but neglect to notice that she has forgotten her phone. On the way home, Kumiko breaks down crying, but finally realizes why Reina had been so upset when they failed to advance at the concert band competition in junior high. Returning to school to retrieve her phone, Kumiko runs into Mr. Taki, who reminds her of her promise to be ready by the competition and encourages her to continue practicing. Realizing that she still has a chance to perform, Kumiko meets up with Reina to share the good news with her.
13	13	"Goodbye Competition"; Transliteration: "Sayonara Konkūru" (Japanese: さよならコンクール)	Directed by : Eisaku Kawanami; Storyboarded by : Naoko Yamada	Kayo Hikiyama, Seiichi Akitake & Rie Sezaki	July 1, 2015
As the day of the competition arrives, the band members all engage in preparations for the upcoming event. Natsuki and Hazuki, along with the other non-performing band members, present to everyone their own personalized good luck charms; Haruka expresses her gratitude for the gesture before offering the band her own words of encouragement. Midori, sensing Kumiko's nervousness over her fear of failure, reassures her. At the concert hall, Mr. Taki reminds the band members that it was they who set the goal of making it to nationals before encouraging them to put on a spectacular performance. Shuichi, despite lingering tensions with Kumiko, attempts to reconcile with her; Kumiko responds with a fist bump. During the performance, Kumiko reminisces back on her junior high days and admits that despite having wished to go to nationals before, she never thought it a serious goal until now. When the results are announced, Kitauji is revealed to have successfully advanced to the Kansai regional competition, with the band celebrating their victory while an overjoyed Reina tearfully hugs Kumiko.
OVA	OVA	"Ready, Set, Monaka"; Transliteration: "Kakedasu Monaka" (Japanese: かけだすモナカ)	Taichi Ogawa	Futoshi Nishiya	December 16, 2015
A side-story focusing on Team Monaka, the members cut following the auditions, as they prepare to support the band in their own way, in advance of the competition.

=== Season 2 (2016) ===
No. overall	No. in season	Title	Directed by	Animation directed by	Original release date
14	1	"Midsummer Fanfare"; Transliteration: "Manatsu no Fanfāre" (Japanese: まなつのファンファーレ)	Directed by : Tatsuya Ishihara & Haruka Fujita; Storyboarded by : Tatsuya Ishihara	Seiichi Akitake, Kohei Okamura & Yuki Tsunoda	October 6, 2016
As the Kitauji wind band celebrates moving on to regionals, Kumiko notices an unfamiliar girl their age leaving the concert hall. Later, Kumiko joins Reina taking part in early-morning practice sessions in addition to usual club meetings. On their first one Kumiko meets the band's only oboist, Mizore Yoroizuka, who is the first student to arrive every morning. The same day, Taki reveals that he has invited his college classmate Hashimoto, a professional percussionist, to instruct the percussion session leading up to the regional competition, and the girl that Kumiko saw at the concert, a flautist named Nozomi Kasaki who quit the club during the clash between serious and laid-back students the previous year, approaches the bass section during their sectionals to ask Asuka's permission to rejoin the band. Asuka refuses. Nozomi turns out to have come from the same middle school as Mizore, and the two are implied to be friends, but Mizore is upset by hearing Nozomi playing her flute from a distance. While watching fireworks at a local festival with Reina, Kumiko muses on why someone who loves music as much as Nozomi would decide to give it up.
15	2	"Hesitation Flute"; Transliteration: "Tomadoi Furūto" (Japanese: とまどいフルート)	Directed by : Taichi Ishidate; Storyboarded by : Yasuhiro Takemoto	Nobuaki Maruki	October 13, 2016
The band members take a break before embarking on a training camp. Kumiko and her friends go to the pool, but wind up running into various senpai from the club, including Nozomi, who opens up to Kumiko about her experiences last year and why she feels like she needs Asuka's permission to rejoin the band. Kumiko offers to ask Asuka why she won't let Nozomi rejoin. Once the training camp begins, Taki reveals that aside from Hashimoto he has asked another former classmate, Niiyama, to tutor the woodwinds. Students wonder if Niiyama is Taki's girlfriend, disheartening Reina. That night Kumiko has encounters with Natsuki, who explains why she wants to help Nozomi, and with Mizore, who says that she hates competitions.
16	3	"Troubled Nocturnes"; Transliteration: "Nayameru Nokutān" (Japanese: なやめるノクターン)	Takuya Yamamura	Kazumi Ikeda	October 20, 2016
The band settles into a Spartan rehearsal schedule as the camp continues. Taki approves Kumiko to play the part she had trouble with in the previous season in concert with Asuka, but Mizore's oboe solo is criticized by Hashimoto, who encourages her to show more emotion. Kumiko approaches Asuka about Nozomi, and Asuka explains that she is refusing Nozomi because of Mizore, who as the only oboeist is crucial to the band's chances at the next competition. The band gets together that night to play with fireworks, and Kumiko learns from Hashimoto that Taki used to be married and is still grieving the loss of his wife. Later on, Kumiko meets and reconciles with Yuuko over their concerns for Mizore and complicated feelings on competitions.
17	4	"Awakening Oboe"; Transliteration: "Mezameru Oboe" (Japanese: めざめるオーボエ)	Taichi Ogawa	Chiyoko Ueno & Nobuaki Maruki	October 26, 2016
With the training camp over, Nozomi comes to thank Kumiko for her efforts and then decides to visit the clubroom and say hello to Mizore. Kumiko tries to prevent them meeting but to no avail, and Mizore runs off. Kumiko and Yuuko search the school for Mizore, who reveals that she still thinks of Nozomi as her only friend (to Yuuko's frustration) and worries that Nozomi quit without telling her because Nozomi doesn't care about her. Nozomi is brought in and the two reconcile; afterwards, Asuka remarks that Mizore is calculating and self-serving, angering Kumiko.
18	5	"Miraculous Harmony"; Transliteration: "Kiseki no Hāmonī" (Japanese: きせきのハーモニー)	Directed by : Yoshiji Kigami; Storyboarded by : Yoshiji Kigami & Tatsuya Ishihara	Yuko Myouken & Yuki Tsunoda	November 3, 2016
Kitauji prepares for the Kansai regionals, with Nozomi having rejoined the band. While there, they hear that Rikka has failed to progress, winning silver. The band members psych themselves up while waiting in the wings; Asuka makes a speech about wanting Kitauji's music to sound out through the whole country at nationals, Mizore promises to play for Nozomi, and Reina promises to play for Kumiko. After their performance, Kitauji wins gold and is chosen to advance to nationals. Kumiko asks Mizore if she still hates competitions, to which Mizore replies that she likes them as of now.
19	6	"Rainy Conductor"; Transliteration: "Amefuri Kondakutā" (Japanese: あめふりコンダクター)	Eisaku Kawanami	Miku Kadowaki	November 10, 2016
The Kitauji band plays a piece in the school's cultural festival, together with the members who did not make the auditions. Seeing Reina frustrated by other students getting crushes on Taki, Kumiko reflects that she can't tell her about Taki's wife. Reina invites Kumiko to her class's exhibit, a haunted house, and she meets Shuuichi there, leading to Kumiko getting teased again about his crush on her. Later, a typhoon hits the region, and Kumiko overhears her sister Mamiko telling her parents that she wants to drop out of college to become a beautician. Kumiko goes out for a walk to escape the tension at home and runs into Taki at the florist's; as he drives her home he tells her about his wife. Kumiko later hears from Sapphire about the floriography meaning of the bouquet Taki bought for his wife indicating that he still loves her.
20	7	"Station Concert"; Transliteration: "Ekibiru Konsāto" (Japanese: えきびるコンサート)	Haruka Fujita	Kohei Okamura & Futoshi Nishiya	November 16, 2016
Taki arranges for the band to play in a concert at the train station. However, one day Asuka's abusive mother arrives at school and tries to force her to quit to focus on exams; Kumiko witnesses the altercation at the teachers' office and sees Asuka's mother hit her. Rumors spread that Asuka is going to quit, worrying the entire club, and though Asuka plays it off as not a big deal, she is able to attend less often. Haruka and Kaori find Asuka's sheet music and realize how much she wants to go to nationals, and Haruka speaks to the band members about the way everyone has relied too much on Asuka and put her on a pedestal. Asuka arrives in time to play at the station concert, where Haruka has a solo.
21	8	"Rhapsody in Flu"; Transliteration: "Kazehiki Rapusodī" (Japanese: かぜひきラプソデイー)	Noriyuki Kitanohara	Yuki Tsunoda	November 23, 2016
Kumiko reflects on her sister, who was her original inspiration for wanting to play music, and the way her sister quit band to focus on college exams. While the other band members are reassured by Asuka saying she won't cause them any trouble, Kumiko asks if she really won't quit, and Asuka invites her to do homework together. Asuka shows up to club less and less often. One day Kumiko catches a cold and goes home early, meeting Aoi along the way. They talk about Asuka, and Aoi is surprised that Asuka has such messy circumstances, which angers Kumiko. At home sick, Kumiko dreams about her early days playing the euphonium, and wakes up to find Reina visiting her. The two of them listen to a CD by a famous euphonist together, but are interrupted by Mamiko, who tells them to stop; Kumiko lashes out at Mamiko, leading to an argument. Mamiko meets Shuuichi later, who tells her how Kumiko wanted her sister to hear her play.
22	9	"Sound! Euphonium"; Transliteration: "Hibike! Yūfoniamu" (Japanese: ひびけ！ユーフォニアム)	Taichi Ishidate	Akiko Takase	November 30, 2016
Various band members pressure Kumiko to do something about Asuka's home situation during her visit, including Natsuki, who has been chosen by Taki as Asuka's understudy. While returning the clubroom key to the teachers' office with Reina, Kumiko expresses exasperation about the situation, but Reina agrees that Kumiko has a way with words when it matters most. While returning the key to Taki, Reina notices a photo on his desk with Taki's wife in it. The next day Kumiko goes to Asuka's house, and Asuka opens up to her about her situation: Asuka's father is a famous euphonist whom her abusive mother has prevented her from ever meeting, he is the one who sent her her euphonium as a child, and that he is set to be a judge at the national competition. She wanted to go to nationals so that he would hear her play. The two of them go out to the riverbank, where Asuka plays for Kumiko.
23	10	"After School Obligato"; Transliteration: "Hōkago Oburigāto" (Japanese: ほうかごオブリガート)	Takuya Yamamura	Kazumi Ikeda	December 7, 2016
After she returns from Asuka's house, Kumiko and her sister reconcile while making dinner, admitting that they were jealous of each other. Mamiko resolves to move out to pursue her dreams. Knowing how much her sister regretted letting their parents push her around, Kumiko appeals to Asuka after school to stay in band, mentioning that everyone wants her to stay. Asuka pushes back against Kumiko's assertions, asking if she can really say so for sure, but Kumiko says that she herself wants to play with Asuka. The two are interrupted by Aoi calling Asuka about the results of a mock exam she took. Later Asuka returns to the band for real, using the fact that she scored in the top 10 in the nation in the mock exam as leverage against her mother. However, Kumiko realizes that Reina is now avoiding her.
24	11	"First Love Trumpet"; Transliteration: "Hatsukoi Toranpetto" (Japanese: はつこいトランペット)	Directed by : Taichi Ogawa; Storyboarded by : Haruka Fujita	Chiyoko Ueno	December 14, 2016
Kumiko unsuccessfully tries to corner Reina with help from Hazuki and Sapphire, only for Reina to ask her to climb Mt. Tenran again. Reina reveals that she is upset with Kumiko for concealing the story of Taki's wife from her. Because Taki was part of Reina's motivation to play, the shock goes on to affect her solo, and she reconciles with Yuuko when the latter encourages her. Reina asks Taki directly about his wife, visits her grave together with Kumiko, and resolves to help grant Taki's wish to win gold at nationals in his wife's memory.
25	12	"The Last Competition"; Transliteration: "Saigo no Konkūru" (Japanese: さいごのコンクール)	Directed by : Yoshiji Kigami; Storyboarded by : Yoshiji Kigami & Naoko Yamada	Yuko Myouken & Tatsunari Maruko	December 21, 2016
The band travels to nationals. During their hotel stay, Kumiko and Shuuichi meet at a vending machine and have an awkward conversation, and he gives her a late birthday gift, a hairpin decorated with the same kind of flowers Taki bought for his wife (having been told by Sapphire that Kumiko likes them). The band plays at the competition. While waiting for their results they realize that they did not come up with a cheer for Taki during the conductors' awards; Reina confesses her love in place of a cheer but is misunderstood. Kitauji wins bronze, but Taki passes on a message to Asuka from her father, and Kumiko has an emotional reunion with Mamiko, who had come to watch.
26	13	"Early Spring Epilogue"; Transliteration: "Harusaki Epirōgu" (Japanese: はるさきエピローグ)	Tatsuya Ishihara, Naoko Yamada & Eisaku Kawanami	Futoshi Nishiya	December 28, 2016
The third year students retire from the club after the competition. Yuuko is named new president and Natsuki the vice-president; Kumiko is frustrated by how much she misses Asuka. Before graduation, the club has a farewell party for the third years, with the third years playing a piece for their juniors and the second and first years playing Crescent Moon Dance for their seniors. On graduation day, Kumiko is at last able to meet up with Asuka, and confesses that though at first she was confused by and disliked her, she now loves Asuka. Asuka gives Kumiko the piece her father wrote, and which she played many times throughout the series, "Sound! Euphonium".

=== Season 3 (2024) ===
No. overall	No. in season	Title	Directed by	Animation directed by	Original release date
27	1	"New Euphonium"; Transliteration: "Aratana Yūfoniamu" (Japanese: あらたなユーフォニアム)	Taichi Ogawa	Mariko Takahashi	April 7, 2024
As the new executive committee of the band, made of Kumiko Oumae, Reina Kousaka, and Shuuichi Tsukamoto, write their exchanges in a notebook for better communication, they prepare to welcome new first year members. Kumiko ends up in the same class as Midori and Hazuki for the third year in a row, as well as Tsubame Kamaya. Tsubame introduces her sister Suzume Kamaya to the bass section as she is interested in playing there. Suzume and her friends Kaho Hariya, Yayoi Kamiishi, and Sari Yoshii decide to sign up for the bass section of the band, save for Sari who already plays the clarinet. After the new first years are assigned instruments, the band unanimously decides on a goal to win gold at Nationals.
28	2	"Triangle Syncopation"; Transliteration: "Sankaku Shinkopāshon" (Japanese: さんかくシンコペーション)	Tatsuya Ishihara	Kohei Okamura	April 14, 2024
A new transfer student, Mayu Kuroe, arrives in Kumiko's class. Previously from the band powerhouse Seira High School, Mayu wishes to join Kitauji's band as a euphonium player. Taki asks the executive committee to choose between three pieces for their free choice piece for the competition. The first years Suzume Kamaya and Sari Yoshii start practicing early to catch up to the band's level. As the band practices marching for SunFes under the strict direction of drum major Reina Kousaka, Suzume Kamaya tries to intervene for her sister Tsubame's sake, thinking she would prefer to play drums rather than be color guard. Tsubame jumps into the conversation, telling Suzume it was her own decision to do so, and complains that she never listens to her. Kumiko, exhausted by the first years, rests on her favorite bench and is joined by Reina to talk about the free choice piece. The three band executives all agree on the same piece, Song of One Year for Concert Band (一年の歌 〜吹奏楽のための Hitotose no Uta Suisō Gaku no Tameno). Taki respects their choice, and decides on the required piece, Scherzando (スケルシャンド Sukerushando).
29	3	"Blue Prelude"; Transliteration: "Mizuiro Pureryūdo" (Japanese: みずいろプレリュード)	Mei Isai	Miku Kadowaki	April 21, 2024
Sari Yoshii and Suzume Kamaya keep coming early to practice. But as Reina Kousaka spares no first year during practice, doubts arise that some might leave. Suzume decides to reveal to Kumiko that a mass boycott of the club by the first years is possible. When Sari, Suzume, Kaho and Yayoi do not show up for practice, Kumiko decides to go see Sari, who is ill, with the two members of the band in charge of new members, Midori and Ririka. Kumiko talks with Sari and reassures her that she will do what she can to sort out issues.
30	4	"Etude With You"; Transliteration: "Kimi to no Echūdo" (Japanese: きみとのエチュード)	Yamamura Takuya	Hikiyama Kayo	April 28, 2024
Motomu Tsukinaga and his grandfather Genichiro Tsukinaga pray at a grave. The Kitauji Quartet discusses Motomu's last name, Tsukinaga, as it is a subject of contention, and how it is uncommon but shared with the famous Ryuusei Academy band advisor Genichiro. The band performs at the Sunrise Festival, where Ryusei and Rikka High School perform as well. Motomu is asked by an old friend, Takashi Higuchi, to talk with Genichiro. Kumiko and Midori decide to talk to Higuchi to help with Motomu and they learn that his sister passed away. Taki reveals to Kumiko that Genichiro asked to have Motomu transfer to Ryuusei. Motomu decides to speak his mind with Kumiko about his sister, the cons of having a relative being your advisor, and how Midori reminds him of his sister. Kumiko advises him to talk with Genichiro and Higuchi and, feeling better, Motomu asks Midori to play Edward Elgar's piece Salut d'Amour together.
31	5	"Twilight for Two"; Transliteration: "Futari de Towairaito" (Japanese: ふたりでトワイライト)	Taichi Ishidate	Tamami Tokuyama	May 5, 2024
At school, Kumiko asks Tsubame and Hazuki about their future plans. Tsubame wants to attend college, but Hazuki is undecided. Kumiko later discusses this with Reina on a train. Reina suggests music school, but Kumiko is hesitant, unsure if she can make a living from music or see herself as a working adult. Reina reveals her own plan to become a professional musician. Kumiko informs the band about the new audition process, confirming to Kanade that new soloists will be chosen for each competition. Midori shares competition insights with others, while Hazuki encourages Motomu to try for a solo part despite his reluctance. On the festival day, Reina and Kumiko go to Reina's place, while Mayu's group enjoys the festival. Kumiko and Reina practice the soli part, sharing their thoughts on their future. Reina fears they won't see each other after high school, but Kumiko reassures her that their bond will remain strong. They head to the festival to check out the food stalls. The episode ends with Kumiko placing a goldfish in the tank, symbolizing her final Agata Festival before graduation.
32	6	"Wavering Dissonance"; Transliteration: "Yuragi no Dizonansu" (Japanese: ゆらぎのディゾナンス)	Noriyuki Kitanohara	Nobuaki Maruki	May 12, 2024
With a month to go until the Prefecturals, the band members prepare for the auditions. Mayu feels uncomfortable about taking the place of an existing player and offers to sit out the audition. Kumiko insists that the band believes that the best player should play the solo. Kumiko bumps into Azusa, who plans to attend a music school without aiming to become a pro. Mayu takes part in the audition. Kumiko, Mayu and Kanade are selected to perform, with Kumiko getting the solo part. Mirei questions the results for the tuba section in private, but Kumiko states that she trusts Taki's decision. Mayu hears Kumiko playing Asuka's piece and becomes curious, but Kumiko awkwardly avoids the subject. Kumiko hesitantly asks Taki about the tuba section results, and Taki explains his reasoning of prioritizing volume over skill. Kitauji plays in the Prefectural competition.
33	7	"Summer Fermata"; Transliteration: "Natsuiro Ferumāta" (Japanese: なついろフェルマータ)	Yamamura Takuya	Mariko Takahashi	May 19, 2024
Kitauji Concert Band advances to the Kansai competition and begins a summer break of grueling practice. During the Bon break, Kumiko attends a college information session with Hazuki, after which Hazuki decides that she will become a nursery-school teacher. Mamiko visits home and encourages Kumiko to do what she likes. During a group visit to the pool, Kumiko chats with Mayu. Mayu confesses that she doesn't have a strong sense of self and just wants to make everyone happy, which reminds Kumiko of her old self. Back at school, Mayu shares the photos she took at the pool with her film camera, but claims that she messed up the only photo that includes herself.
34	8	"Melancholy Ostinato"; Transliteration: "Nayameru Osutināto" (Japanese: なやめるオスティナート)	Directed by : Ryo Miyaki; Storyboarded by : Mei Isai	Miku Kadowaki	May 26, 2024
Summer training camp begins, with auditions to follow. Reina practices the solo with Kumiko in private and acknowledges Mayu's skills. Mayu again offers to Kumiko to forfeit the audition. Kumiko snaps at Mayu, but ultimately reiterates that Kitauji believes in the best player playing. The auditions are held, and Mayu participates. One early morning, Kumiko plays Asuka's piece out in the field as Mayu watches from afar. Taki announces the results of the audition: Kumiko and Mayu will be performing without Kanade, and Mayu will be playing the solo.
35	9	"Dissonant Tuning"; Transliteration: "Chiguhagu Chūningu" (Japanese: ちぐはぐチューニング)	Taichi Ishidate	Hikiyama Kayo	June 2, 2024
Training camp continues. Kanade and Tsukamoto question Taki's decision-making. Reina is disappointed but accepts the decision. Mayu offers to concede the solo part to Kumiko, but Kumiko refuses and asks her to play her best. The band returns to school, but morale remains low. Kumiko tries to hear out the growing complaints amongst the band members, while Reina believes that they just want to blame Taki for their own lack of skills. When Kumiko admits to Reina that she can't completely trust Taki, the two have a falling-out, with Reina calling her "a failure of a president."
36	10	"Expressing Arpeggios"; Transliteration: "Tsutaeru Arupejio" (Japanese: つたえるアルペジオ)	Directed by : Minoru Ōta & Noriyuki Kitanohara; Storyboarded by : Minoru Ōta	Kohei Okamura	June 9, 2024
Kumiko asks Taki about the recent changes, to which he replies he is doing his best to create a performance that will win gold in the Nationals. The band openly expresses concern and doubt during practice. Kumiko and Tsukamoto consider asking Taki to intervene, but Reina objects, arguing that such a gesture will only hurt the band further. Kumiko visits Asuka for advice. Asuka observes that both Taki and the band are stuck with the decision and that Kumiko should just speak her mind like she always has. On the day of the Kansai competition, Kumiko gives a heartfelt speech to the band about her wish to win the Nationals with Kitauji. The band cheers in support before going up on stage.
37	11	"Orchestra to the Future"; Transliteration: "Mirai e Ōkesutora" (Japanese: みらいへオーケストラ)	Noriyuki Kitanohara	Nobuaki Maruki	June 16, 2024
Kitauji wins gold at the Kansai competition and advances to the Nationals. Mayu and Reina's solo during the Kansai performance receives high praise from the band. Taki thanks Kumiko for the speech and reflects on his philosophy for teaching. Kumiko discovers that Reina will be studying in America. Reina apologizes to Kumiko for the earlier fight. Mayu again offers the solo part to Kumiko and argues that Kumiko is lying about what she really wants. Kanade points out that Mayu is trying to make Kumiko tell her to forfeit. Kumiko and Reina attend a concert at Mizore's university. Mizore comments that she can't picture Kumiko at her university. Kumiko tells Reina that she will not be attending music school but that Reina will remain a special person to her.
38	12	"The Last Soloist"; Transliteration: "Saigo no Sorisuto" (Japanese: さいごのソリスト)	Directed by : Yamamura Takuya; Storyboarded by : Taichi Ogawa	Mariko Takahashi & Hikiyama Kayo	June 23, 2024
The audition results for the National competition are announced, but another separate audition is announced for the euphonium solo, to be voted on by the other band members. Taki explains to Kumiko that both she and Mayu are fit to play the solo. Kumiko asks Taki to hold a blind audition so that everyone will have to judge by sound alone. Kumiko finally decides on her career path. Before the final audition, Kumiko and Mayu have an honest conversation - Kumiko explains her belief in having the best person play, and Mayu reveals her wish for everyone to be happy while playing. After the audition, the votes result in a tie, and Reina casts the deciding vote. The winner is revealed to be Mayu. Kumiko announces to the band that this is the best roster for the Nationals. At the top of Mount Daikichiyama, Reina tearfully confesses to Kumiko that she recognized Kumiko's sound but chose Mayu anyway. Kumiko admits that her hesitation showed in her playing and tells Reina that she is proud of her decision before breaking down in tears.
39	13	"Connecting Melodies"; Transliteration: "Tsunagaru Merodi" (Japanese: つながるメロディ)	Directed by : Tatsuya Ishihara & Kohei Okamura; Storyboarded by : Tatsuya Ishihara	Kazumi Ikeda, Miku Kadowaki & Nobuaki Maruki	June 30, 2024
Mayu and Kanade discover Kumiko playing Asuka's piece again, and Kumiko invites them to play together. Kumiko and Reina play together on Mount Daikichiyama, and Reina declares she'll confess her love to Taki once she becomes a great player in America. Kitauji gives their final competition performance on the National stage as Kumiko reminisces about her 3 years in the band. Kitauji wins gold. Years later, at the start of a new school year, an adult Kumiko addresses the Kitauji Concert Band as its assistant advisor.

== Films ==
Two new animated films telling the events of Kumiko's second year at Kitauji High were scheduled for release in 2018. The first film, directed by Naoko Yamada and written by Reiko Yoshida, titled Liz and the Blue Bird (リズと青い鳥, Liz to Aoi Tori), focuses on Nozomi and Mizore and premiered on April 21, 2018. Theatrical distributor Eleven Arts released the film in theaters on November 9, 2018, in the United States. Shout! Factory released it on home video on March 5, 2019. The second film, titled Sound! Euphonium: The Movie – Our Promise: A Brand New Day (劇場版 響け！ユーフォニアム～誓いのフィナーレ～, Gekijōban Hibike! Yūfoniamu: Chikai no Fināre; lit. 'Oath's Finale' or 'Oath of the Finale') and originally scheduled for release in 2018, is directed by Tatsuya Ishihara and focuses on Kumiko as a student in her second year and premiered on April 19, 2019. The film was released in select US theaters on July 11, 2019, and the English dub debuted on July 15, 2019. The English dub has a different voice cast compared to Liz and the Blue Bird, though Sarah Anne Williams, Ryan Bartley and Megan Harvey reprised their roles as Natsuki, Satomi and Yuko, respectively. The film was released on a home media set on June 2, 2020, from Shout Factory.
