= Hyouka (TV series) =

Japanese anime television series

- Promotional art issued by Funimation Entertainment depicting the main characters. Left to right: Eru Chitanda, Satoshi Fukube, Houtarou Oreki, and Mayaka Ibara.
- 氷菓; Hyōka
- Genre: Mystery, slice of life
- Based on: Classic Literature Club: Hyouka by Honobu Yonezawa
- Developed by: Shoji Gatoh
- Directed by: Yasuhiro Takemoto
- Voices of: Yūichi Nakamura; Satomi Satō; Daisuke Sakaguchi; Ai Kayano
- Music by: Kōhei Tanaka
- Opening theme: "Yasashisa no Riyū" (Note: Episodes 1–2, 4, 6–8, 10–11) by ChouCho; "Mikansei Stride" (Note: Episodes 13–16, 18-20, 22) by Saori Kodama
- Ending theme: "Madoromi no Yakusoku" (Note: Episodes 2–4, 6–11) by Satomi Satō & Ai Kayano; "Kimi ni Matsuwaru Mystery" (Note: Episodes 12–14, 16, 18, 20–22) by Satomi Satō and Ai Kayano
- Country of origin: Japan
- Original language: Japanese
- No. of episodes: 22 + 1 OVA (list of episodes)

Production
- Executive producer: Takeshi Yasuda
- Producers: Atsushi Itō; Hideaki Hatta
- Animator: Kyoto Animation
- Running time: 26 minutes
- Production company: Kamiyama High School Classical OB Department

Original release
- Network: CTC, TVS, TVQ, tvk, KBS, Sun TV, GBS, Tokyo MX, MTV, BS11
- Release: April 22 – September 16, 2012

Hyouka (氷菓) is a Japanese anime television series based on the Classic Literature Club series written by Honobu Yonezawa. It was named after the first volume of the series, Hyouka, and made into a 22-episode televised animation series. The story follows Houtarou Oreki, a first-year high school student who meets Eru Chitanda, Satoshi Fukube, and Mayaka Ibara after joining his school's Classic Literature Club.

Hyouka was produced by Kyoto Animation, with directing by Yasuhiro Takemoto, series composition by Shoji Gatoh, and character design by Futoshi Nishiya. The opening theme played in the first half of the series was sung by ChouCho, and the opening played in the second half was sung by Saori Kodama. The ending theme of both parts of the series was sung by Satomi Satō and Ai Kayano. The main cast includes Yuichi Nakamura, playing Oreki, and Satomi Satō playing Chitanda. The story is set in Kamiyama, a fictional city based on Honobu Yonezawa's actual home city, Takayama.

The original 22 episodes were broadcast from April to September 2012. A bonus original video animation was streamed via Ustream in July 2012. A two-part Blu-ray edition was also released. Hyouka was commended for its visual effects, and for combining the genres of mystery and slice of life.

== Synopsis ==
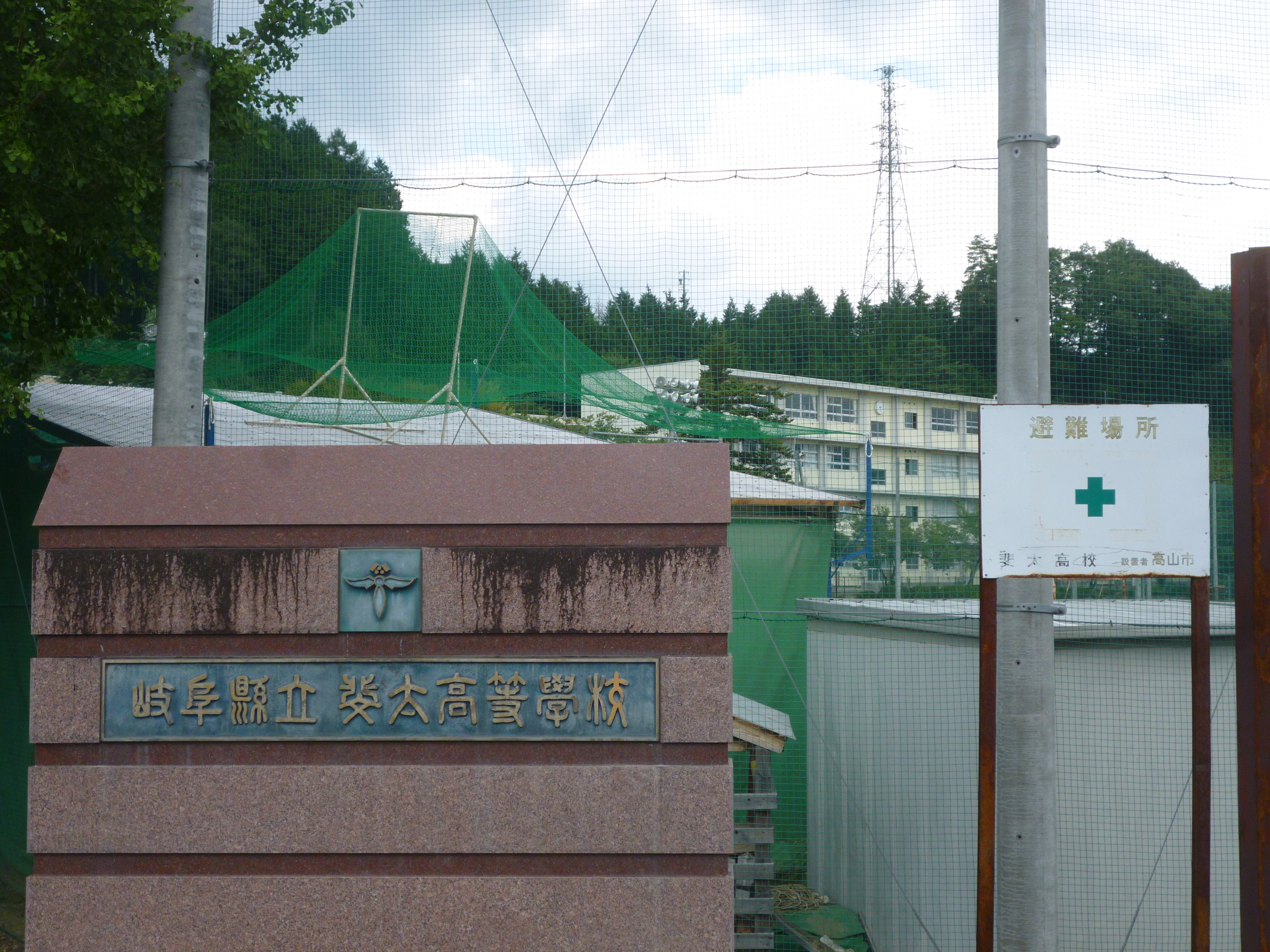
Hida High School, in Takayama, Gifu, served as the model for this series.

Houtarou Oreki is a student at Kamiyama Senior High School. He tries to follow his motto of "If I don't have to do something, I won't, but if I have to, I'll do it quickly," and is a believer of the so-called "energy conservatism". However, his plan is interrupted when his sister forces him to join the school's Classic Literature Club, which is at the risk of being disbanded. Oreki joins the club along with Eru Chitanda, Satoshi Fukube, and Mayaka Ibara.

To Houtarou's dismay, Chitanda gets in the way of his "energy conservatism" by asking Oreki to solve problems every time her curiosity arises. One day, Eru asks Houtarou to meet at a local cafe. Chitanda informs him the reason she joined the club: her uncle, a former member of the club, went missing in India and is awaiting a funeral as he needs to be declared as legally dead. She says she does not remember what her uncle said, putting her in tears as a child and asks Houtarou for his help. Houtarou reluctantly agrees. After further consideration, Eru asks the other members of the club to assist in the investigation. Houtarou, with evidence given by the rest of the members, reveals Eru's uncle was expelled from the school against his will due to a school protest. He informs the club's traditional anthology Hyouka, is a pun: translated in English means "I Scream" (Ice Cream). This pun is a warning by Chitanda's uncle, where he wanted to tell future club members to voice their opinions.

With Eru's uncle's case resolved, the club members start preparing their annual anthology, Hyouka. However, they are interrupted by Eru's senior, Fuyumi Irisu. She asks the Classic Lit. Club, specifically Houtarou, to research the true ending of her class' (Class 2-F) independent film, whose author, Hongou, fell ill before completing the script. The two parties end up coming to an agreement the Class 2-F will come up with possible theories and evidence, while Oreki and his friends will make their own interpretation based on the theories given by Class 2-F. Houtarou comes up with the "true" ending of the story, and the movie is played successfully with positive responses. However, other members of the Club pose flaws in his theories, and as Houtarou investigates more, he discovers Irisu's true plan: Irisu never intended to find the "true" ending of the movie, but instead made a cover-up to make Houtarou the new author, since she thought Hongou's script was too boring.

Soon after, the long-anticipated cultural festival, the "Kanya Festival", begins. The Classic Lit. Club prepares to sell the anthology "Hyouka". However, due to a misprint, they end up with 200 copies, instead of 30. Thus, the club members scramble to advertise their club by participating in school events. However, the club members soon realize strange robberies occurring throughout the school. A culprit by the name of "Juumonji" appears, robbing festival supplies from different clubs, in which after always leaving behind a note. Houtarou and the club begin to investigate, and realize the robberies are taking place in alphabetical order, a mock crime of The A.B.C. Murders. Houtarou finds the culprit to be Jiro Tanabe, a member of the school's executive committee. Jiro tried to send a code to the school's Executive Committee President, Muneyoshi Kugayama, who has quit art and the project they were working on despite being talented, which angered him. Jiro Tanabe was also frustrated because the writing had already been done by writer, all that was need was the visual style. Tanabe had feelings for the writer who had transferred schools after Muneyoshi Kugayama decided to quit art. Houtarou strikes a deal with Jiro before the festival is over to make the final event of "Juumonji" to advertise "Hyouka" in return of Houtarou keeping this fact a secret. Unfortunately, Kugayama is unable to decrypt this code because he never read what the writer wrote and the incident is passed off as a funny prank.

Months pass and many events happen to the Oreki and his friends. In the New Year Festival, Houtarou and Eru end up getting trapped in a wooden hut but successfully escape after sending a message to Satoshi. On Valentine's Day, a chocolate Mayaka made for Satoshi is stolen. Houtarou realizes something about Satoshi and questions him about the incident, in which Satoshi reveals he stole the chocolate due to his fear of developing strong feelings to Mayaka. Satoshi ends up calling Mayaka. As spring arrives, Eru asks Houtarou to join the Hinamatsuri, which is disturbed by a construction happening early on a bridge used in the festival. With the permission of the neighboring shrine, the route is changed and the Hinamatsuri ends successfully. Eru and Houtarou guesses a young man changed the date of the construction to get better pictures of the festival. On the way home, Eru tells Houtarou she wishes to stay in the quiet town. Houtarou tells her he would like to help with her dream, but quickly stops and says the weather is cold. Eru replies spring has already arrived, and a breeze blows through the cherry blossoms.

== Characters ==
Character	Japanese	English	Description
Hōtarō Oreki	Yuichi Nakamura	Adam Gibbs	"Energy conservationist" first-year high school student.
Eru Chitanda	Satomi Satō	Madeleine Morris	A member of the noble Chitanda family. Joins the Classic Lit. Club to find out about something.
Mayaka Ibara	Ai Kayano	Jill Harris	A childhood friend who was in the same class with Hōtarō from Gr. 1 to middle school graduation. Has romantic feelings for Satoshi.
Satoshi Fukube	Daisuke Sakaguchi	Dallas Reid	A close friend of Hōtarō who joins the Classic Lit. Club with him.
Tomoe Oreki	Satsuki Yukino	Caitlin Glass	Older sister of Hōtarō.
Fuyumi Irisu	Yukana	Alexis Tipton	The driving force behind Class 2-F's movie production.
Yoko Itoigawa	Mami Koyama	Linda Young	The school's teacher-librarian, and former member of the Classic Lit. Club.

== Production ==
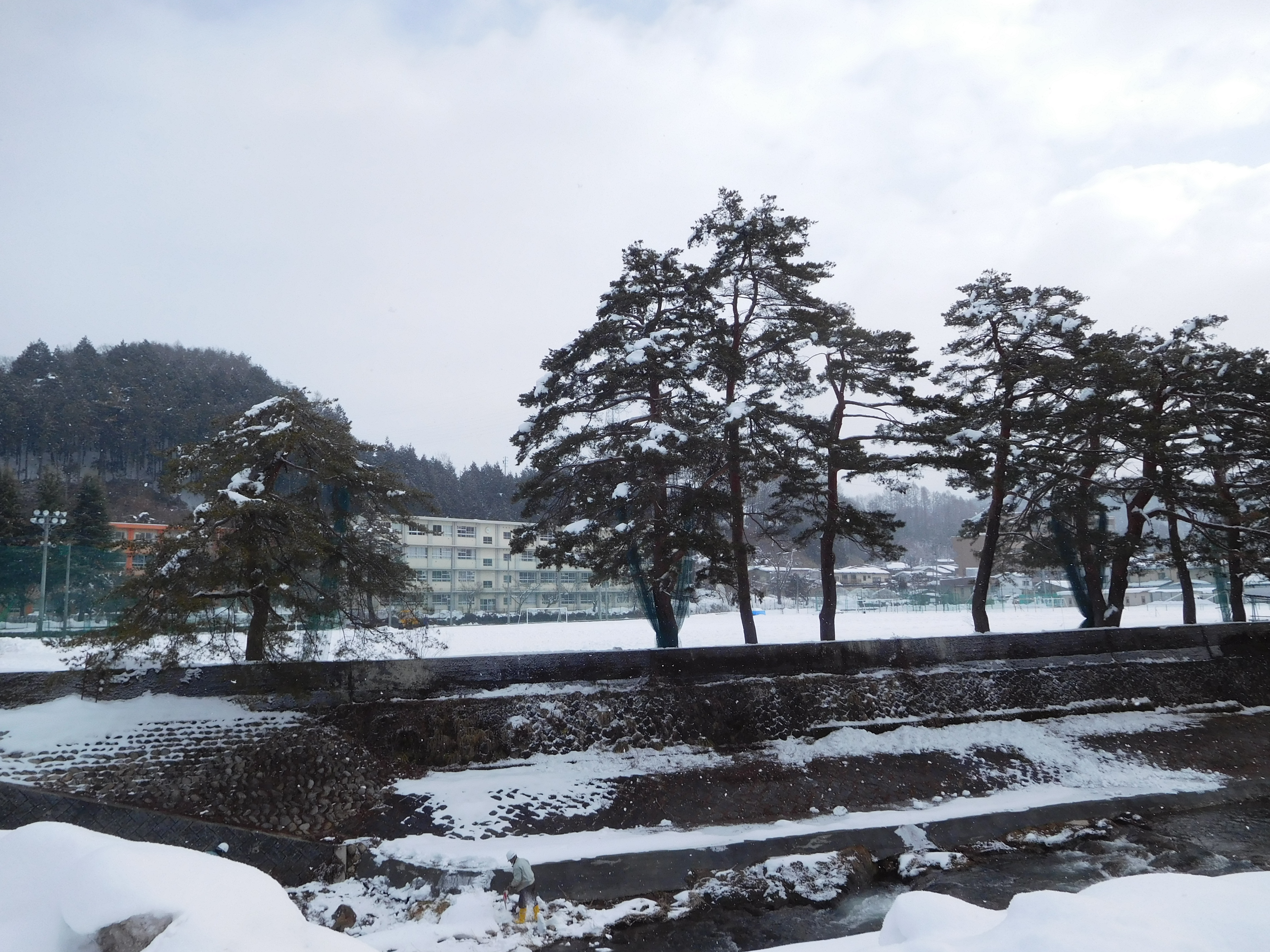
Hida Senior High School

The television anime series Hyouka was animated by Kyoto Animation. Honobu Yonezawa provided the source material, being the original author of Hyouka and the adaptation consultant for the anime. Yonezawa also participated in the process of producing the animation, but as he believed that it was more important for Hyouka to be a good anime than a novel, he entrusted Shoji Gatoh and the studio for most of the work. The key staff included Yasuhiro Takemoto as director, Futoshi Nishiya as the character designer, Naomi Ishida as the color designer, Shuhei Okude as the art director, Ryuuta Nakagami as the cinematographer, Hiroshi Karada for setting, Kengo Shigemura as editor, Tsuruoka Yota as audio director, and Kohei Tanaka as the music composer. According to an interview with SakugaBlog, Yasuhiro Takemoto has volunteered to be the director for the series. The series' writer, Shoji Gatoh, was invited by Yasuhiro Takemoto to participate.

Hyouka is set in a fictional city called Kamiyama in Gifu Prefecture. This is based on Honobu Yonezawa's actual home city, Takayama. In 2018, the Anime Tourism Association included Takayama in the list of "88 sacred anime pilgrimage sites in Japan."

Hyouka features several real-life locations in Takayama. The Kamiyama Senior High School, which appears in the opening and each episode, is based on Hida Senior High School. The Kajibashi bridge, which goes across the Miyagawa river, is also featured in the opening and Episode 18. The Miyagawa Morning Market Street is also featured in the opening. The Arekusujinja Shirne, featured in Episode 20 and the opening, is based on the Hiejinja shrine. Other sites include the Yaoihashi Bridge shown in the opening and Episodes 11 and 18, the Hirayu Onsen Hot Springs shown in Episode 7, the Takayama City Library (as Kamiyama City Library) in Episode 18, and the Minashi Shrine and Garyu Cherry Trees shown in Episode 22.

=== Music ===
The anime features two openings and endings, each with its own theme music. The first opening theme, used for the first 11 episodes, is "Yasashisa no Riyū" (Japanese: 優しさの理由, Reason of Kindness) by ChouCho. The first ending theme, used for the first 11 episodes, is the song "Madoromi no Yakusoku" (Japanese: まどろみの約束, Promise of Slumber). The second opening theme used from episode 12 and onwards is "Mikansei Stride" (未完成ストライド, Unfinished Stride) which was sung by Saori Kodama. The second ending theme is "Kimi ni Matsuwaru Mystery" (Japanese: 君にまつわるミステリー, Mystery Surrounding You). Both ending themes were sung by Satomi Satō and Ai Kayano.

Kohei Tanaka took charge of composing the music for Hyouka. Hyouka features a significant amount of classical music in its soundtrack, including Sicilienne by Fauré, and Air on the G String by Johann Sebastian Bach. Tanaka said in an interview that the use of classical music was requested by Honobu Yonezawa.

Hyouka's four themes were published as an album. The album for the first opening theme, "Yasashisa no Riyū", was released on May 2, 2012. The album for the first ending theme, "Madoromi no Yakusoku", was released on May 23, 2012. The album for the second opening theme, "Mikansei Stride", was released on August 8, 2012. The album for the second ending theme, "Kimi ni Matsuwaru Mystery", was released on August 22, 2012.

Yasashisa no Riyuu
No.	Title	Length
1.	"Yasashisa no Riyuu (優しさの理由)"	04:15
2.	"Komorebiiro no Kioku (木漏れ日色の記憶)"	04:27
3.	"Aozora no Kodou (青空の鼓動)"	04:17
4.	"Yasashisa no Riyuu (Off Vocal)"	04:14
5.	"Komorebiiro no Kioku (Off Vocal)"	04:27
6.	"Aozora no Kodou (Off Vocal)"	04:16
Total length:		25:56

Madoromi no Yakusoku
No.	Title	Length
1.	"Madoromi no Yakusoku (まどろみの約束)"	04:27
2.	"Romance Wa Mada Hayai (ロマンスはまだ早い)"	03:48
3.	"Madoromi no Yakusoku (Inst.)"	04:27
4.	"Romance Wa Mada Hayai (Inst.)"	03:47
Total length:		16:29

Mikansei Stride
No.	Title	Length
1.	"Mikansei Stride (未完成ストライド)"	04:26
2.	"Daisy"	04:46
3.	"Cinema Sky (シネマスカイ)"	04:29
Total length:		13:21

Kimi ni Matsuwaru Mystery
No.	Title	Length
1.	"Kimi ni Matsuwaru Mystery (君にまつわるミステリー)"	04:16
2.	"Fade In/Out (フェードin/out)"	04:15
3.	"Kimi ni Matsuwaru Mystery (Inst.)"	04:16
4.	"Fade In/Out (Inst.)"	04:13
Total length:		17:00

=== Broadcast and distribution ===
Hyouka aired 22 episodes from April 22 to September 15, 2012, and was broadcast on Tokyo MX, Chiba TV, Television Saitama, Television Kanagawa, KBS Kyoto, Sun Television, Gifu Broadcasting System, Mie Television, TVQ Kyushu Broadcasting, and BS11. Its PV was released in March 2012, and the first episode was played on April 14, 2012, at Kadokawa Cinema in Shinjuku as a special event. It also received a bonus original video animation, and was streamed via Ustream on July 8, 2012. The OVA was later re-released as a Blu-ray disk along with Hyouka's third manga volume.

In North America, Funimation (later Crunchyroll, LLC) acquired the license to Hyouka and released it on home media on July 4, 2017, with its own English dub production, directed by Mike McFarland and Cris George. In addition to the home video release, Hyouka was also streamed on its streaming service. The series was distributed in the United Kingdom and Ireland by Anime Limited until 2019. After Funimation acquired Manga Entertainment's UK business operations, Funimation re-released the series in the United Kingdom and Ireland on November 22, 2021. Following the acquisition of Crunchyroll by Sony, Funimation's parent company, the series was moved to Crunchyroll. Hyouka also aired on television via Animax Asia in Southeast Asia and Hong Kong. In South Korea, Mirage Entertainment produced a Korean dubbed home video edition of the series.

== Reception ==
=== Critical response ===
Hyouka was ranked highly on a variety of lists. It was ranked 25th place in the "Best Anime 100" in an NHK poll. On BIGLOBE's Animeone, Hyouka was ranked 1st place in the 2012 Spring Anime category. It was also listed in Crunchyroll Editorial's top 100 anime of the decade.

Hyouka's story was met with favorable reviews for its approach to the everyday aspect of the slice of life genre. Many critics complimented the level of detail to even the less important characters of the story, and also for the show's uniqueness in the mystery genre. THEM Anime Reviews pointed out that the show was unique in the field of mysteries for dealing with "trivial but always personal" mysteries, and Anime News Network's Paul Jensen noted Hyouka's uniqueness genre-wise, claiming that it was the only show combining mystery and slice of life in that way. Others commended the storytelling, with Joshua Stevens from Crunchyroll News commenting that it was a slice of life that engaged him in ways that even K-On! could not making him feel like he was "walking alongside" the two main characters. Paige Villacin from CBR also commended Hyouka's storyline, describing it as "KyoAni's most emotionally mature shows to date". However, some critics described the show as being "dull", and others pointed out that the show lacked unity and a sense of conclusion.

Hyouka’s characters were also met with generally favorable reviews, although some critics, like Beveridge from The Fandom Post, found the characters in the show lifeless. Some critics found the characters unique, with some finding that the characters were "distinctive" and "slipping past" stereotypes. Anime News Network's Nick Creamer found that the character development reached "stunning dramatic peaks", and Joshua Stevens from Crunchyroll News wrote that Hyouka 'truly excelled' in the sense it provided a better understanding of the characters rather than just the "complexity of its mysteries". The main characters were also met with favourable commentary, and some noted that the story's main female protagonist, Eru Chitanda, had a simple persona that drove the story while having the complexity and intelligence to make her more than a "plot device". The male protagonist of the show, Oreki, was complimented for being an entertaining character, with THEM Anime Reviews noting his wit and dynamic attempts to avoid doing anything. However, some critics criticized Oreki's character, with Beveridge describing him as an "absolute downer". Other critics commented on the dynamics within Hyouka's contrasting characters, with Paige Villacin from CBR calling it the "true charm" of the show.

Critics commended Hyouka's art, with some describing it as "probably their (Kyoto Animation's) most beautiful series" and the "most beautiful television anime of all time." Critics also commented on its "eye-catching character designs". Many critics, including Beveridge, who was mostly negative about the show, complimented the show's art for its technical aspects such as lighting and background. Some critics also commended the music of the series, with Nick Creamer from Anime News Network claiming that though the show was not a musical standout, it had an "excellent ear for sound design".

=== Sales ===
The 11 Blu-ray volumes and the BD box compilations consistently appeared on the Oricon weekly Blu-ray sales chart upon release: Volume one of Hyouka's Blu-Ray edition was ranked sixth place on Oricon's weekly Blu-ray ranking in 2012. Volume two was ranked seventh place on the week of July 23–29, 2012. Volume three was ranked second place on the week of August 27–September 2, 2012 and was ranked seventh and sixth place respectively in the following two weeks. Volume four was ranked second place on the week of September 24–30, 2012 and remained in fifth place in the following two weeks. Volume five was ranked eighth place on the week of October 29–November 4, 2012. Volume six was ranked first place on the week of November 26–December 2, 2012. Volume seven was ranked fourth place on the week of December 31–January 6, 2013. Volume eight was ranked third place on the week of January 21–27, 2013. Volume 9 was ranked tenth place on the week of February 18–24, 2013. Volume ten was ranked seventh on the week of March 25–31, 2013. Volume eleven was ranked eighth place on the week of April 22–28. Blu-ray BD box was ranked third place on the week of February 23 – March 1, 2015, and 14th place on the following week.

=== Events ===
Hyouka was used in marketing events for Gifu Prefecture and Takayama City. Gifu's Red Cross held an event where Hyouka posters were provided blood donors. Takayama City distributed 10,000 maps showing the real-life locations of Hyouka. The show was also featured in Takayama City's rice production, selling featured rice of the show. The Takayama Police produced wet tissues and clear files featuring Hyouka characters in crime prevention campaigns. In 2020, Anime Tourism Association organized a virtual reality tour of Hyouka's real-life locations.

On April 22, 2022, Hyouka met its 10th anniversary, and related projects were announced. Its 10th-anniversary logo and poster were released. A museum for Hyouka took place in the GAMERS main store in Akihabara from May 25 to June 15, 2022. Kujibikido also partnered with Hyouka for an online lottery, providing goods to win. Ameba TV streamed the first 11 episodes of Hyouka on April 22, 2022, and Gifu Broadcasting System began rebroadcasting Hyouka starting from April 6, 2022. On November 17, 2022, Kadokawa released the creditless openings of Hyouka in anticipation of its 10th anniversary concert, which was held on January 29, 2023.
