= Nurse Witch Komugi =

Japanese OVA series

- Nurse Witch Komugi Complete Collection DVD Cover

ナースウィッチ小麦ちゃんマジカルて (Nāsu Witchi Komugi-chan Majikarute)
- Genre: Comedy; Magical girl; Parody
- Created by: Tatsunoko Production
- Original video animation
- Directed by: Yoshitomo Yonetani (Note: Chief director. Also episode director for episodes #3 and 7 and screenwriter for episode 7.)
- Written by: Armstrong Takizawa (Note: Series composition. Also screenwriter for episodes #1–2 and 6.)
- Music by: Ryuji Takagi
- Studio: Tatsunoko Production; Kyoto Animation (Note: Episodes #1–5)
- Licensed by: NA: Sentai Filmworks
- Released: August 23, 2002 – September 22, 2005
- Episodes: 7 + 1 extra
- Manga
- Illustrated by: Rei Nakajima
- Published by: Hakusensha
- Magazine: Young Animal Arashi
- Original run: August 27, 2003 – September 29, 2003
- Volumes: 2
- Video game

Nurse Witch Komugi-chan Magical te
- Publisher: KID
- Genre: Adventure
- Platform: PlayStation 2
- Released: February 26, 2004
- Anime television series

Nurse Witch Komugi-chan R
- Directed by: Keiichiro Kawaguchi
- Written by: Momoko Murakami
- Music by: Kousuke Yamashita
- Studio: Tatsunoko Production
- Licensed by: NA: Sentai Filmworks
- Original network: Nippon TV
- Original run: January 10, 2016 – March 27, 2016
- Episodes: 12
- icon

Nurse Witch Komugi, known in Japan as Nurse Witch Komugi-chan: Magikarte (Note: Magikarte is a pun on "magical" and "karte", a German loanword used to refer to medical records) (Japanese: ナースウィッチ小麦ちゃんマジカルて, Hepburn: Nāsu Witchi Komugi-chan Majikarute), (Note: From episode 6 onwards the title changes to Nurse Witch Komugi-chan: Magikarte Z (Japanese: ナースウィッチ小麦ちゃんマジカルてZ, Hepburn: Nāsu Witchi Komugi-chan Majikarute Zetto)) is an original video animation (OVA) anime series produced by Tatsunoko Production. The series lasted for seven episodes (eight if episode 2.5 that appeared in the middle of the series is included), all of which were released on DVD in North America by ADV Films.

The story of the anime is a parody of both The SoulTaker and the magical girl anime genre. It revolves around Komugi Nakahara, a cosplay idol who turns into Magical Nurse Witch Komugi when trouble is around.

While the English dub of the show was adapted by ADV, the original The SoulTaker dub was not. In a rare move, ADV recalled many of the voice actors from The Ocean Group dub of The SoulTaker to reprise their roles in Nurse Witch Komugi to keep consistency between the two dubs.

An anime television series Nurse Witch Komugi-chan R aired from January 10, 2016, to March 27, 2016. The new series is a reboot of the original OVAs.

== Characters ==
All but a few characters return from The SoulTaker, appearing as bizarre parodies of themselves.

Komugi Nakahara (中原 小麦, Nakahara Komugi)
Voiced by: Haruko Momoi (Japanese); Jocelyne Loewen (English)
The main character, a seventeen-year-old cosplayer, who transforms into Nurse Witch Komugi. She works for a talent agency called Kiri Pro, where she acts and endorses products (usually while wearing silly costumes). She can be very hyper and silly, which usually gets her into trouble with her bosses. Her nurse witch costume resembles a cross between a nurse uniform and a rabbit costume.
Mugimaru (ムギまる, Mugimaru)
Voiced by: Yuji Ueda (Japanese); Luci Christian (English)
Komugi's 'side-kick', a perverted rabbit-like creature from Vaccine World who detects viruses.
Kyosuke Date (伊達 京介, Date Kyōsuke)
Voiced by: Mitsuki Saiga (Japanese); Brad Swaile (English)
A famous singer, working for Kiri Pro's rival company. He is also Komugi's romantic love interest, sweetheart, and crush. In SoulTaker, he was the protagonist of the series on a search for his long-lost twin sister Runa, along the way discovering his own abilities as a mutant byproduct of the Beta Applicon Project.
Koyori Kokubunji (国分寺 こより, Kokubunji Koyori)
Voiced by: Ikue Otani (Japanese); Kira Vincent-Davis (English)
Koyori is a friend of Komugi and works with her as a model and cosplayer. However, from time to time, Koyori will lose consciousness and transform into Magical Maid Koyori, her evil form. Koyori will then infect innocent people with viruses. She could be considered Komugi's rival. She often gets frustrated at being constantly defeated by Komugi and Mugimaru. After a time, she will revert to her good form again with no memory of anything she did in her evil form.
Posokichi (ポソ吉, Posokichi)
Voiced by: Ai Shimizu (Japanese); Monica Rial (English)
Magical Maid Koyori's 'side-kick', a quiet raccoon. In Episode 4, Magical Maid spends months training Posokichi to speak.
Yui Kirihara (桐原 夕映, Kirihara Yui)
Voiced by: Akiko Hiramatsu (Japanese); Lisa Ann Beley (English)
Ms. Yui is the president of Kiri Pro. She often scolds Komugi when she messes up (which is quite often). She is 29 years old, and once was a well-known and famous idol, and she fell in love with a president from another talent agency, Mr. Richard. Everything was going well for her, until Richard announced to the press that he was in love with Ms. Yui's manager on the same day Ms. Yui was going to announce her engagement to Richard. She was heart broken and humiliated, so she quit the idol business and became the president of her own talent agency.
Shiro Mibu (壬生 シロー, Mibu Shirō)
Voiced by: Masaya Onosaka (Japanese); Trevor Devall (English)
Shiro is Komugi's manager. He usually has a laid-back, relaxed personality, but when Komugi skips out on her job (usually to become Magical Nurse and save the city), then it is best to not cross his path. He also will get stuck with Komugi's job until she returns, usually wearing one of her costumes. Although he yells at Komugi, he sticks up for her when Ms. Yui scolds her for her disappearances and mess-ups. He has an assortment of nicknames for Komugi, including "Little Shit" or "Little piss-ant girl" (English translation). It is also been shown that he works well with computers, for he designed and manages Komugi's personal fan site for her.
Megumi Akiba (秋葉 恵, Akiba Megumi)
Voiced by: Atsuko Enomoto (Japanese); Jessica Boone (English)
Megumi also works at Kiri Pro, and is Komugi's bitter rival. Megumi, unlike Komugi, has much sex appeal, and she is often the one to tease Komugi about her flat chest, to which Komugi retorts with an insult such as "Hooter's Girl" to insult her enormous chest. Megumi is an image girl, posing for center folds and posters, although she also has an interest in acting.
Runa Tokisaka (時逆 琉奈, Tokisaka Runa)
Voiced by: Michiko Neya (Japanese); Cynthia Martinez (English)
Runa is a child star at Kiri Pro. She normally seems calm and cute, but she occasionally makes rude comments, usually about Komugi. She, like Megumi, calls Komugi a flat-chest and a pseudo-Idol. She takes advantage of her cute appearance to earn more money. In SoulTaker she is the twin sister of Kyosuke Tokisaka ("Date") who was constantly being hunted down by the remaining members of the Tokisaka Clan and the Kirhara hospital. Like Kyosuke, she is a strong mutant.
Asuka Sakurai (櫻井 明日香, Sakurai Asuka)
Voiced by: Yukari Tamura (Japanese); Shelley Calene-Black (English)
Asuka was once a movie actress, but was demoted to Kiri Pro. Komugi thinks it is an honor to have a professional actor working with her, but in reality it means Asuka is close to losing her job as an actress. Asuka works hard at her job at Kiri Pro, and is usually more responsible than Komugi or Megumi. She doesn't complain much, but can lose her temper just as well as the others. Unlike the other Kiri Pro employees, Asuka respects Komugi and forms a friendship with her. In Magikarte Z, it is revealed that Asuka hates Osaka with quite a passion.
The Goddess Maya (女神マヤ, Megami Maya)
Voiced by: Ikue Otani (Japanese); Christine Auten (English)
Maya is the goddess of Vaccine World who sent Mugi-maru to earth to find a human (Komugi Nakahara) to carry the magic baton and defeat Ungrar.

== Episodes ==
No. overall	No. in season	Title	Directed by	Written by	Original release date
1	1	"Smash! Komugi vs. Hikki. The Biggest Battle at Akihabara"; Transliteration: "Gekitotsu! Komugi VS Hikkī・Akihabara Taidai no Tatakai!" (Japanese: 激突! 小麦VSひっきー・アキハバラ最大の戦い!)	Yasuhiro Takemoto	Armstrong Takizawa	August 23, 2002
2	2	"Horror! Maid Magic Girl Descends. Decisive Battle at the Top of Odaiba"; Transliteration: "Kyōfu! Meido Mahō Shōjo Kōrin・Otaiba Chōjō Kessen" (Japanese: 恐怖! メイド魔法少女降臨・お台場頂上決戦)	Yasuhiro Takemoto	Armstrong Takizawa	November 2, 2002
3	2.5	"A Quiet Talk Special. Hunch of Another Festival, Heave-Ho!"; Transliteration: "Kanwakyūdai Supersharu〜Futatabi Matsuri no Yokan de Wasshoi!〜" (Japanese: 閑話休題すぺしゃる〜再び祭りの予感でワッショイ!〜)	Masatsugu Arakawa	Armstrong Takizawa	June 6, 2003
4	3	"Serious! Komugi Dies Two or Three Times?!"; Transliteration: "Maji~tsu! Komugi-chan wa 2-do 3-do Shinu!?・Senritsu no Kuruizaki Izu Itō Rōdo!" (Japanese: マジッ! 小麦ちゃんは2度3度死ぬ!?・戦慄の狂い咲き伊豆伊東ロード!)	Yoshitomo Yonetani	Tsuyoshi Tamai	September 10, 2003
5	4	"Pioneer! The Anime Studio that Invites Storms"; Transliteration: "Sakigake! Arashi no Yobu Anime Sutadio・Suidōbashi Dai Bakuha!?" (Japanese: 魁! 嵐を呼ぶアニメスタジオ・水道橋大爆破!?)	Toshihiro Ishikawa	Tsuyoshi Tamai	December 21, 2003
6	5	"Encounter Has Come"; Transliteration: "Meguriai Kita" (Japanese: めぐりあい きた)	Masato Tamagawa	Tsuyoshi Tamai	April 2, 2004
7	6	"Again! Super Magical Battle in Red-Hot Summer Osaka!"; Transliteration: "Sainen! Chō Majikaru Batoru・Shakunetsu no Ōsaka Natsu no Jin!!" (Japanese: 再燃! 超まじかるバトル・灼熱の大阪夏の陣!!)	Hiroshi Matsuzono	Armstrong Takizawa	September 10, 2004
8	7	"Did the Maid Fall Asleep!? Komugi, Final Verse!"; Transliteration: "Kasei-fu wa Nete Ita!? Komugi Fainaru Uōzu!!" (Japanese: 家政婦は寝ていた!? 小麦ファイナルウォーズ!!)	Yoshitomo Yonetani	Yoshitomo Yonetani	September 22, 2005

== Musical themes ==
Nurse Witch Komugi

- "Ai no Medicine" by Haruko Momoi (OP, ep.1–5)
- "Shooting Star" by Haruko Momoi (OP, ep.6–7)
- "Otome no Mahou de Ponde-Ke-Wa" by Haruko Momoi (ED, ep.1–4)
- "Three" by Haruko Momoi (ED, ep.5)
- "Oyasumi" by Haruko Momoi (ED, ep.6–7)

Nurse Witch Komugi R

- "Ready Go!!" by Magical R (Note: A fictional group consisting of voice actresses Kei Tomoe, Erii Yamazaki and Makoto Koichi.) (OP)
- "Ame to Namida to Otome to Taiyaki" by Otome Shinto (ED)
