= The SoulTaker =

Japanese anime television series

THE SOUL TAKER(ザソウルテイカー) 〜魂狩〜 (Za Sōru Teikā ~Tamashii Gari~)
- Created by: Tatsunoko Production
- Anime television series
- Directed by: Akiyuki Shinbo
- Produced by: Kohei Kawase; Michiko Suzuki; Shoichi Yoshida
- Written by: Mayori Sekijima
- Music by: Kow Otani
- Studio: Tatsunoko Production
- Licensed by: Geneon Universal Entertainment
- Original network: WOWOW
- English network: CA: G4 Canada; US: TechTV, G4TechTV
- Original run: April 4, 2001 – July 4, 2001
- Episodes: 13
- Original video animation

The SoulTaker: Komugi's Great Operation
- Directed by: Akio Watanabe (episode 1 & 2); Toshiaki Tetsura (episode 3)
- Studio: Tatsunoko Production
- Released: 2001
- Episodes: 3
- Novel series

The SoulTaker ~Tamashii Gari~
- Written by: Masaki Wachi
- Illustrated by: Akio Watanabe; Katsumasa Ito; Gokan Rokukan
- Published by: Media Factory
- Imprint: MF Bunko J
- Original run: December 25, 2003 – January 25, 2004
- Volumes: 2
- Spin-off
- Nurse Witch Komugi

The SoulTaker (Japanese: THE SOUL TAKER 〜魂狩〜, Hepburn: Za Sōru Teikā ~Tamashii Gari~) is an anime series that focuses on seventeen-year-old Kyosuke Date who was killed by his mother Mio Date, and afterward gained the ability to turn into an incredibly powerful winged mutant known as "The SoulTaker" and that he has a long-lost twin sister named Runa, and that his past is all a lie.

The series was directed by Akiyuki Shinbo and was Tatsunoko's first anime to utilize digital animation as well as the first anime to be broadcast on high-definition television, and features a seven-episode spinoff OVA miniseries featuring the character Komugi titled Nurse Witch Komugi, albeit Shinbo did not return to direct the OVAs.

== Plot ==
After being stabbed in the chest by his mother, Kyosuke Date is resurrected to find out he has a twin sister named Runa, and the ability to transform into the amazingly strong, powerful and dangerous superhuman mutant known as the SoulTaker. As he seeks out his twin sister, he is being pursued by the strange mutant doctors and nurses of the hospital, led by his own father, Richard Vincent, as well as the evil Kirihara corporation, led by Yui Kirihara, who are also tracking down Runa for their own malevolent purposes.

Assisting him along the way are the mysterious Shiro Mibu and the nurse mutant girl Komugi Nakahara, who betrayed the Hospital out of strong romantic love for Kyosuke.

== Characters ==
Kyosuke Tokisaka Date (伊達 京介, Date Kyōsuke) Voiced by: Mitsuki Saiga (Japanese); Brad Swaile (English)
The main character. He is a mutant boy who is kind-hearted, generous, selfless, serious and determined. After being stabbed in the heart by his adoptive mother, Mio, he returns to life to find his long-lost twin sister, Runa. He has the mutant ability to transform into the tremendously strong and dangerous superhuman mutant known as "The SoulTaker". He can also communicate and resonate telepathically with Runa and the fragments of her spirit/soul called flickers.
In Nurse Witch Komugi, he appears as a seventeen-year-old star who helps his long-lost twin sister Runa who has mysteriously been released from his body and retains her five-year-old look.
Shiro Mibu (壬生 シロー, Mibu Shirō) Voiced by: Masaya Onosaka (Japanese); Trevor Devall (English)
The man who aligns himself with Kyosuke and Komugi against the Kirihara Corporation. It is later revealed that Shiro is Yui's younger brother.
Komugi Nakahara (中原 小麦, Nakahara Komugi) Voiced by: Haruko Momoi (Japanese); Jocelyne Loewen (English)
A nurse girl who betrayed the Hospital to help Kyosuke after she realizes that she has fallen for him. She is the main protagonist in the mini spin-off, Nurse Witch Komugi.
Maya Misaki (岬 真夜, Misaki Maya) Voiced by: Ikue Ōtani (Japanese); Kelly Sheridan (English)
Kyosuke's good friend and savior, who was soon kidnapped by the Kirihara Corporation to be experimented on to search for Runa Tokisaka. She was the very first Flicker to be created. She is restored to life when all of the Flickers leave Runa. She was the first SoulAnubis, before all the Flickers were absorbed into Runa.
Yui Kirihara (桐原 夕映, Kirihara Yui) Voiced by: Akiko Hiramatsu (Japanese); Lisa Ann Beley (English)
The CEO and head of the Kirihara Corporation, and one of the series' antagonists. She is killed by the Alien, who is later revealed to be five-year-old Runa herself. In Nurse Witch Komugi, she appears as a director of the company; her return unknown.
Dr. Richard Vincent (リチャード・ビンセント, Richādo Vinsento) Voiced by: Masashi Ebara (Japanese); Paul Dobson (English)
One of the main antagonists who is the late Tsubaki's husband, and the father of Kyosuke and Runa. He is also a mutant, with the ability to turn into the mutant SoulCrusher. He battles his son in the fifth episode, and reveals the truth about the Hospital and the Beta Applicon virus to Kyosuke. He ends up being destroyed by his own son in their second (and last) battle.
Olivia Carlile (オリビア・カーライル, Oribia Kārairu) Voiced by: Miki Itō (Japanese); Venus Terzo (English)
Dr. Kyoya (ドクトル凶也, Dokutoru Kyōya) Voiced by: Toshihiko Seki (Japanese); Brian Drummond (English)
The first mutant that Kyosuke faces in the premiere episode "The Crest of the Devil." Kyoya fights Kyosuke (now in his mutant form) but is eventually defeated when Kyosuke kills him with the Lightning Breaker.
Mio Date (伊達 水脈, Date Mio) Voiced by: Minami Takayama (Japanese); Ellen Kennedy (English)
Kyosuke's adoptive mother who had stabbed him in the heart in order to awaken his dormant abilities as a mutant, as the only way to have done so was to betray a loved one. She was a good friend of Tsubaki Tokisaka, who entrusted Mio to raise Tsubaki's son, as Tsubaki did want to involve him with her family's dark ambitions regarding her twin daughter and his own twin sister, Runa.
Tsubaki Tokisaka (時坂つばき, Tokisaka Tsubaki) Voiced by: Mako Hyōdō (Japanese); Nicole Oliver (English)
She is the wife of Richard Vincent and mother of fraternal twins Kyosuke and Runa. She was one of the Tokisaka Clan who used the extraterrestrial substance of the Beta Applicon to further their research in eradicating disease and the evolution of humankind. She was the first to be saved after her father, Daigo Tokisaka, had injected the alien anti-virus into her system. Five years later, she and her daughter were pursued by the members of the Kirihara Corporation. Knowing that she could no longer protect Runa, she had stabbed her in the chest in order for Runa to develop her inherent mutant abilities. The circumstances of her demise is unknown, though Runa had unconsciously created a Flicker that took on her appearance and memories. This motherly flicker appeared to Kyosuke in the seventh episode, "The Last of a Woman".
Runa Tokisaka (時逆 琉奈, Tokisaka Runa) Voiced by: Michiko Neya (Japanese); Brittney Irvin (English)
The main antagonist who is Kyosuke's fraternal twin sister and creator of the Flickers. She is accused of being the Devil. Although she appears to be five years old, she is actually seventeen years old. She appears as a five-year-old child when her Flickers are not in her body. When they were absorbed into her body, she transformed into a seventeen-year-old teenage girl, which is her true form and can turn into the mutant SoulAnubis. In the spinoff Nurse Witch Komugi, she is a five-year-old child star who works alongside her seventeen-year-old twin brother Kyosuke.

== Terminology ==
- Applicon Buster (アプリコンバスター, Apurikon Basuta) - A very deadly antidote that was created by Daigo Tokisaka for the sole purpose of destroying the Beta Applicon. It is powerful enough to be hurled like missiles to wipe out all mankind on Earth.
- Beta Applicon (βアプリコン, Beta Apurikon) - A virus capable of turning humans into mutants by altering their DNA.
- Flicker (フリッカー, Furikka) - These are fragments of Runa that she generates as well as being reflections of her existence.
- Hospital (ホスピタル, Hosupitaru) - An organization founded by its director Richard Vincent and many surviving mutants to relieve those who were infected with the Beta Applicon.
- Kirihara Corporation (桐原グループ, Kirihara Gurupu) - Originally a funeral business company, the Kirihara Corporation is a large global conglomerate. Armed with cutting-edge science and power, facilities and factories are set up around the world.

== Production ==
In 1996, studio J.C.Staff collaborated with and provided director Akiyuki Shinbo for Tatsunoko Productions' 1996 OVA New Hurricane Polymar at the request of the character designer, Yasuomi Umetsu; and succeeding the end of New Hurricane Polymar, Shinbo and Tatsunoko Productions started work on another project which was ultimately never produced. Shinbo was then asked to direct the cutscenes for the Tatsunoko-produced video game Tatsunoko Fight (2000) and was then asked to direct an original series titled "Warhead", which eventually became "The SoulTaker."

Directing the series, Shinbo admitted to being more focused on the series' aesthetic and visual presentation than the story itself, which he left the entirety of the organization of to frequent collaborator and writer Mayori Sekijima. Character designer/chief animation director Akio Watanabe and visual director/mechanical designer Toshiaki Tetsura, also previous collaborators of Shinbo's, were invited to participate on the series as well. Together, Shinbo and Tetsura experimented with a technique of using the former's cleaned-up and enlarged storyboards for the purpose of using them as background layouts (原図).

The series found itself in various production troubles, most notably in that Tatsunoko Productions and the team were unable to find studios who were willing to take on outsourcing jobs for the series. This set the series' production schedule back in the long run, and in total only three of the episodes were produced outside of Tatsunoko Productions: episodes 3 and 6, which were produced at Kyoto Animation; and episode 10, which was produced by Triangle Staff and Shaft. Shinbo lauded the studio's efforts, saying he was impressed with their quality. Triangle Staff and Shaft's episode in particular had a rough production schedule due to episode director and storyboard artist Shintarou Inokawa's storyboards being very late, and Shinbo was surprised that Shaft (who was mainly in charge of producing the episode) was interested in handling it despite the tighter deadline.

In a 2012 interview, Shinbo mentioned having interest in making a prequel or sequel series to The SoulTaker.

== Anime ==
This thirteen episode-series produced by Tatsunoko Productions and directed by Akiyuki Shinbo, premiered on the Japanese television network WOWOW on April 4, 2001, and ended exactly 3 months later on July 4, 2001. Two days after the last episode aired, North American anime licensor Geneon Entertainment USA licensed the series and released it on 4 volumes on DVD and VHS. In 2004, Geneon had re-released the series under their Signature Series label.

It originally aired in the United States on TechTV as part of Anime Unleashed, and later aired on G4 after the TechTV merger.

The series' opening theme is "Soul Taker" by JAM Project while the ending theme is "Memory" by Shinji Kakijima.

No.	Title	Directed by (Note: Information is taken from the ending credits of each episode.)	Written by	Storyboarded by	Original release date	U.S. air date
1	"The Crest of the Devil"; Transliteration: "Akuma no Monshou-hen" (Japanese: 悪魔の紋章 篇)	Shintarou Inokawa	Masashi Kubota	Akiyuki Shinbo	April 4, 2001	June 25, 2003
One day, something bad happened. A mother named Mio killed her son named Kyosuke Date by stabbing him the heart. Is this the end for him? Or is it the start of a new adventure?
2	"The World is an Illusion"; Transliteration: "Utsushi Yo wa Yume-hen" (Japanese: うつし世は夢 篇)	Shintarou Inokawa	Kenichi Araki	Akiyuki Shinbo (Note: Under the pseudonym Souji Homura (帆村壮二).)	April 11, 2001	June 26, 2003
Kyosuke asks his newfound friend Shiro why his mother Mio killed him but he doesn't know. Meanwhile, the Kirihara Corporation captures Maya so that they can undergo experiments on her. At the same time, Kyosuke dreams about Maya's struggles and sees an amusement park. He runs off and heads to the amusement park. Can Kyosuke save Maya? And what new enemies are awaiting his arrival in the amusement park?
3	"The Skull and the Maiden"; Transliteration: "Dokuro to Shoujo-hen" (Japanese: 髑髏と少女 篇)	Yasuhiro Takemoto	Masashi Kubota	Yasuhiro Takemoto	April 18, 2001	June 27, 2003
A girl is being chased by mysterious people. Meanwhile, Kyosuke heads to the church to look at his mother's diary. At the church his eyes begin to bleed and the girl from earlier claims that she is his twin sister Runa. Is this girl really his long-lost twin sister or is it a trap set up by the Kirihara Corporation?
4	"The Slithering Darkness"; Transliteration: "Ugomeku Yami-hen" (Japanese: 蠢く闇 篇)	Matsuo Asami	Sumio Uetake	Susumu Kudou	April 25, 2001	July 1, 2003
A boarding house in the middle of a forest is the home for another Flicker named Sayaka Tachibana. Outside, Kyosuke and Shiro observe the boarding house. Later, the houses' nurse says that she will help them. Is this nurse really going to help them? Or is she a minion of Dr. Narukami?
5	"Beyond the Human Realm"; Transliteration: "Jingai Makyou-hen" (Japanese: 人外魔境 篇)	Kenji Nakamura (Note: Assisted by Masahiro Aizawa.)	Masashi Kubota	Keiichi Sato; Akiyuki Shinbo (Note: Assisted by Roberto Ferrari.)	May 2, 2001	July 2, 2003
Kyosuke decides to infiltrate the Kirihara Corporation's base so that he can save a Flicker named Kasumi. Meanwhile, Shiro heads to the core of the base with the intentions of destroying the Flicker Searcher. Kasumi and Kyosuke were attacked and separated from each other. Kyosuke goes into a room where the director of the Hospital, Dr. Richard Vincent, awaits him. He transforms into the winged mutant "SoulCrusher". In a heated battle, he reveals that he is Kyosuke's father and that he was betrayed by Tsubaki Tokisaka, his own wife, to the Beta Applicon Project even before she gave birth to his children- Kyosuke and Runa.
6	"The Malevolent Stratosphere Castle"; Transliteration: "Seisouken Majou-hen" (Japanese: 成層圏魔城 篇)	Yasuhiro Takemoto	Mayori Sekijma	Yasuhiro Takemoto	May 9, 2001	July 3, 2003
The battle against the SoulCrusher might be over but more danger awaits Kyosuke. After losing a wing in his last battle, he is plummeting down to Earth until he was teleported inside a floating fortress. There he meets a Flicker named Megumi who he starts to trust and actually like. Also in the fortress is a mutant named Zabo but he is in a state of suspended animation. Later, Megumi finally reveals her true form and expresses her intense anger towards Kyosuke. Can Kyosuke defeat her?
7	"The Last of a Woman"; Transliteration: "Nyonin Hate-hen" (Japanese: 女人果 篇)	Kiyoshi Fukumoto	Kenichi Araki	Yuuji Kawahara	May 16, 2001	July 4, 2003
On the riverside, Shiro, Komugi, and Kyosuke perform a riverside ritual were they put candles on boats in memory of their deceased loved ones. But a mysterious woman appears that says that she is Kyosuke's birth mother, Tsubaki Tokisaka. She explains that Megumi is wrong about the things she said. However, several Hospital mutants appear but Kyosuke manages to defeat them while getting injured in the process. He later wakes up with his parents there for a visit. Can all of this be real?
8	"Mask of Hell"; Transliteration: "Jigoku no Kamen-hen" (Japanese: 地獄の仮面 篇)	Shintarou Inokawa (Note: Assisted by Matsuo Asami.)	Sumio Uetake	Shirou Fukatake (Note: A pseudonym.)	May 23, 2001	July 8, 2003
Shiro reveals to Kyosuke that his older sister, Yui, is the actual leader of the Kirahara Corporation. Shiro says that his power-mad elder sister wants the Flickers so that she could finally find Runa. Also, Shiro tells Kyosuke that he could have saved his mother but decided not to because only the mental trauma that he experience was the only thing that could awaken his own dormant abilities as the "SoulTaker" mutant. Meanwhile, Komugi is about to fight Yui's new monster she calls the "SoulAnubis".
9	"Phantom of a Beautiful Dead Woman"; Transliteration: "Shibijin no Gen'ei-Hen" (Japanese: 死美人の幻影 篇)	Yoshio Suzuki	Mayori Sekijima	Masahiro Hosoda	May 30, 2001	July 9, 2003
Kyosuke arrives to help Komugi and while doing so, The SoulAnubis sees his cross and turns Kyosuke back into his human form. Kyosuke recognizes the face and it was Maya. Then Yui explains that she combined Flickers to create this new beast including Shiro's beloved sweetheart and girlfriend, Saki. Meanwhile, Richard Vincent spots Komugi and starts to heal her.
10	"Sacrifice for Nothingness"; Transliteration: "Kyomu e no Kumotsu-hen" (Japanese: 虚無への供物 篇)	Shintarou Inokawa	Sumio Uetake	Shintarou Inokawa	June 13, 2001	July 10, 2003
Runa's signal has been lost and a strange underwater entity has told Yui to cut off their ties with the aliens. Meanwhile, Kyosuke decides to fight his father, Richard Vincent, but Komugi tries to talk him out of it. He later encounters the Director of the Hospital, who transforms into the SoulCrusher and the two engage in a violent battle to the death.
11	"Demon on a Deserted Island"; Transliteration: "Kotou no Oni-hen" (Japanese: 孤島の鬼 篇)	Minoru Oohara	Kenichi Araki	Junichi Sakata	June 20, 2001	July 11, 2003
As Kyosuke and Komugi travel to Colony Eight, located on the moon to finally learn the truth, the Flicker girls (made up of Megumi, Kasumi, Asuka and Sayaka) await them to annihilate Kyosuke. After easily defeating them, he goes to the center of Colony Eight and finds a floating brain that turns out to be his maternal grandfather, Daigo Tokisaka, the man who caused the Beta Applicon Project seventeen years ago. He explains how he attempted to use the Beta Applicon given to him by a male alien to eradicate all disease and illness from all humankind. By injecting his own daughter, Tsubaki, who had been fatally ill the mysterious substance had miraculously saved her, which resulted in her giving birth to Richard Vincent's children; fraternal twins Kyosuke and Runa.
12	"Madonna in Black"; Transliteration: "Kokui no Seibo-hen" (Japanese: 黒衣の聖母 篇)	Hiroshi Matsuzono (Note: Assisted by Minoru Oohara.)	Masashi Kubota	Kazunori Mizuno	June 27, 2001	July 15, 2003
On the moon, Runa herself appears as a five-year-old child in front of her long-lost twin brother and the doctor. After absorbing all of the flickers back into her body, Runa takes on her true form as a seventeen-year old teenager. The doctor intends to kill Runa once and for all by using the mysterious Applicon Buster that helped give birth to Kyosuke and Runa to begin with. Runa, however, spreads the Applicon Buster into the atmosphere towards Earth, much to Kyosuke's shock. The doctor is destroyed by Kyosuke reluctantly taking the soul and spirit of his adoptive mother, Mio, as the two were connected by sharing the same spirit and soul. Having been freed, Runa runs to Kyosuke and lovingly hugs him, happy to be reunited with her twin brother at last. But Kyosuke is worried about the new and improved Beta Applicon Buster being unleashed upon Earth and asks Runa why she would do such a thing. Nearby, Shiro wonders what choice Kyosuke will ultimately make: Will he save Runa or will he kill his own twin sister to spare all humanity?
13	"The Last Inferno"; Transliteration: "Shoujo Jigoku-hen" (Japanese: 少女地獄 変)	Akiyuki Shinbo (Note: Uncredited.)	Mayori Sekijima	Akiyuki Shinbo	July 4, 2001	July 16, 2003
Kyosuke and Runa are still trapped in a virtual world of Runa's own creation of their home on Earth, being with their parents, Richard and Tsubaki, and living their lives together as a family. Kyosuke breaks out of the virtual world, much to Runa's anger, and intends to battle her to make her stop. Runa gives her twin brother one last warning: join her or be destroyed along with the humans. Kyosuke refuses his twin sister's offer. The two fraternal twins take on their mutant forms and do battle in a church-like place. As they are battling, Kyosuke tries to convince Runa that they are indeed human beings, regardless of their physical appearances and abilities. Runa furiously ignores Kyosuke, as she strongly believes that all humans are devils because her own mother, Tsubaki, had tried to kill her by stabbing her in the chest twelve years ago. Kyosuke uses his newfound abilities to experience the pain young Runa had felt when their mother had stabbed her. He then explains to Runa that he had understood what their mother was feeling: She was not trying to kill Runa, but had stabbed her so that she could "live." By giving her daughter a traumatic blow, she had intended to give Runa an incredibly strong ability to protect herself. A horrified and disbelieving Runa tells Kyosuke how she does not want to die. Her fear and terror of death causes the flickers to exit her body and Runa becomes a five-year-old child once again. Now that everything is over, Kyosuke reassures Runa that they can finally leave the past behind them and have hopes for their future. He then absorbs his own twin sister into his body to keep her safe from any harm under his brotherly protection.

== Notes ==
=== Citations ===
- Maeda, Hisashi; Hiraiwa, Shinsuke (2007). アニメ新表現宣言！新房監督作品の奥にアニメ表現の最先端を見た！ [Declaration of a New Expression for Anime! I saw the Cutting Edge of Anime Expression in Director Shinbo's Work!] (in Japanese). Tamon Creative.
- Shinbo, Akiyuki (2012). 新房語 [Shinbogatari] (in Japanese). Ichijinsha. ISBN 978-4758012591.
