= Futoshi Nishiya =

Japanese animator and character designer (died 2019)

- 西屋 太志
- Born: 1981 or 1982; Mitsugi, Hiroshima, Japan
- Died: 18 July 2019 (aged 37); Fushimi, Kyoto, Japan
- Cause of death: Arson attack
- Occupations: Animator; character designer
- Years active: 2003–2019
- Employer: Kyoto Animation
- Notable work: Hyouka; Free!; A Silent Voice

Futoshi Nishiya (西屋 太志, Nishiya Futoshi; 1981 or 1982 – 18 July 2019) was a Japanese animator, director and character designer.

== Career ==
After graduating from a vocational college in Osaka, he began to work at Kyoto Animation. His first work as a key animator was Inuyasha in 2003 (which was contracted from Sunrise Inc). In 2006, he took on his first ever animation director role in the 10th episode of The Melancholy of Haruhi Suzumiya, and also took on the role of chief animation director in the 2009 remake of the series.

He took on his first lead character design role in the 2011 anime adaption of Nichijou. In 2012, he worked on the original character designs of Hyouka, which is based on the mystery novel of the same title written by Honobu Yonezawa. As the original work is a novel, the character designs needed to be done from scratch.

== Death ==
Following the Kyoto Animation arson attack on 18 July 2019, it was reported that Nishiya was unaccounted for. On 2 August 2019, it was confirmed that he died in the arson attack at the age of 37 years old.

== Filmography ==
- Inuyasha - Key animator
- Full Metal Panic! - Key animator
- AIR - Key animator
- FMP! The Second Raid - Key animator
- Haruhi Suzumiya (2006 release) - Animation director, key animator
- Kanon - Animation director, key animator
- Lucky Star - Animation director, key animator
- CLANNAD - Animation director, key animator
- CLANNAD ～AFTER STORY～ - Animation director, key animator
- K-On! - Animation director, key animator
- K-ON!! - Animation director, key animator
- Haruhi Suzumiya (2009 re-release) - Chief animation director, animation director, assistant animation director
- Nichijou - Character designer, chief animation director, animation director
- Hyouka - Character designer and draft, chief animation director, animation director
- Love, Chunibyo & Other Delusions - Animation director
- Tamako Market - Animation director, key animator
- Free! - Character designer, chief animation director, animation director, key animator
- Beyond the Boundary - Assistant animation director
- Love, Chunibyo & Other Delusions -Heart Throb- - Animation Director, key animator
- Free！-Eternal Summer- - Character designer, chief animation director, animation director
- Amagi Brilliant Park - Animation director, assistant animation director
- Sound! Euphonium - Animation director
- Sound! Euphonium 2 - Animation director
- A Silent Voice - Character design
- Miss Kobayashi's Dragon Maid - Animation director
- Free！-Dive to the Future- - Character designer, chief animation director
