= Yasuhiro Takemoto =

Japanese animator and director (1972–2019)

- 武本 康弘
- Born: April 5, 1972; Akō, Hyōgo, Japan
- Died: July 18, 2019 (aged 47); Fushimi, Kyoto, Japan
- Cause of death: Arson attack
- Occupations: Animator; television and film director
- Years active: 1994–2019 (Note: Although Takemoto died in 2019, he is credited as a Series Director for the 2021 series Miss Kobayashi's Dragon Maid S (a role he has been posthumously given), and several of his production materials (such as storyboards) have been used for the series (which is under the direction of Tatsuya Ishihara).)
- Employer: Kyoto Animation
- Notable work: The Melancholy of Haruhi Suzumiya; Lucky Star; Hyouka; Amagi Brilliant Park; Miss Kobayashi's Dragon Maid

Yasuhiro Takemoto (Japanese: 武本 康弘, Hepburn: Takemoto Yasuhiro; April 5, 1972 – July 18, 2019) was a Japanese animator and television and film director. He worked at Kyoto Animation for almost his entire animation career after joining the company in 1996 until his death in 2019.

== Career ==
After graduating, he entered at the Yoyogi Animation Institute, a specialized animation academy located in Yoyogi, Shibuya, Tokyo. Upon graduation, he joined the animation studio Kyoto Animation, where he became a director.

His first major job as a director came in 2003 with Full Metal Panic? Fumoffu. Two years later, he directed his sequel: The Second Raid. In 2007, Takemoto replaced Lucky Star director Yutaka Yamamoto after his dismissal. He led The Melancholy of Haruhi-chan Suzumiya and Nyorōn Churuya-san original net animation series, and was co-director with Tatsuya Ishihara of the second season of The Melancholy of Haruhi Suzumiya, broadcast in 2009, as well as the film The Disappearance of Haruhi Suzumiya.

In 2012, he was in charge of directing Hyouka, based on the series of mystery novels by Honobu Yonezawa of the same name. The series was done in collaboration with Shoji Gatoh as screenwriter, author of Full Metal Panic!. Two years later, in 2014, Takemoto was commissioned to direct another series of Gatoh novels, Amagi Brilliant Park.

Takemoto had great knowledge of classical music. The usage of Shostakovich's 7th symphony in episode 12 ("The Day of Sagittarius") of The Melancholy of Haruhi Suzumiya and the choice of Erik Satie's pieces for the film The Disappearance of Haruhi Suzumiya were his ideas.

== Death ==
Four days after the Kyoto Animation arson attack on July 18, 2019, Takemoto was declared missing by his father, who stated "he was untraceable". His death was later confirmed by his relatives and authorities.

== Filmography ==
=== Director ===
- Amagi Brilliant Park: Director, Episode Director (ep 3, 7)
- High Speed! Free! Starting Days: Director, Storyboard
- Full Metal Panic? Fumoffu: Director, Screenplay (ep 5), Storyboard (ep 1, 9, 12), Episode Director (ep 12)
- Full Metal Panic! The Second Raid: Director
- Hyouka: Director, Script (ep 11.5), Storyboard (OP, ED 1, ED 2, ep 1–2, 22), Episode Director (ep 1, 22)
- Lucky Star: Director (ep 5 onwards)
- Miss Kobayashi's Dragon Maid: Director, Script (ep 3, 7, 9), Storyboard (OP, ED, ep 1–3, 13)
- The Melancholy of Haruhi Suzumiya: Director
- Nurse Witch Komugi: Director (ep 1-2), Storyboard (ep 1-2), Episode Director (ep 1-2)
- The Disappearance of Haruhi Suzumiya: Director, Storyboard, Key Animation; Chief direction by Tatsuya Ishihara)
- The Melancholy of Haruhi-chan Suzumiya: Director

=== Other ===
- Air: Storyboard (ep 3, 6), Episode Director (ep 3), Key Animation (OP, ep 3)
- Beyond the Boundary: Storyboard (ep 2, 4, 10), Episode Director (ep 2, 4, 10)
- Beyond the Boundary -I'll Be Here- Future: Key Animation
- Clannad: Storyboard (ep 10, 16, 22), Episode Director (ep 10, 16, 22), Key Animation (ep 10, 22)
- Clannad After Story: Storyboard (ep 5, 24), Episode Director (ep 24)
- Haré+Guu: Storyboard (ep 14, 24), Episode Director (ep 14, 24)
- K-On!: Key Animation (ep 10)
- K-On!!: Storyboard (ep 9, 23, 27), Episode Director (ep 27)
- Master of Mosquiton: Key Animation
- Nichijou: Storyboard (ep 8, 16, 22, 25), Episode Director (ep 8, 16, 22, 25), Key Animation (ep 2, 8)
- Sound! Euphonium: Storyboard (ep 7), Episode Director (ep 7), Key Animation (OP, ep 7)
- Sound! Euphonium 2: Storyboard (ep 2)
- Sound! Euphonium: The Movie – May the Melody Reach You!: Storyboard
- Tenchi the Movie: Tenchi Muyo in Love: Key Animation
- Tenchi Universe: Key Animation (ep 23)
- The Family's Defensive Alliance: Episode Director (ep 6)
- The Melancholy of Haruhi Suzumiya: Storyboard (ep 11), Episode Director (ep 11)
- The SoulTaker: Storyboard (ep 3, 6), Episode Director (ep 3, 6)
- Violet Evergarden: Storyboard (ep 4, 9), Episode Director (ep 9)

== See also ==
- List of solved missing person cases (2010s)
