= Hyouka =

Japanese mystery novel by Honobu Yonezawa and its adaptations

- Cover of the Hyouka novel

氷菓
- Genre: Teen social mystery, slice of life
- Novel
- Written by: Honobu Yonezawa
- Published by: Kadokawa Shoten
- Imprint: Kadokawa Sneaker Bunko
- Published: October 31, 2001
- Other novels
- List of Classic Literature Club novels
- Manga
- Written by: Taskohna
- Published by: Kadokawa Shoten
- English publisher: MY: Kadokawa Gempak Starz
- Magazine: Shōnen Ace
- Original run: January 26, 2012 – present
- Volumes: 17
- Anime television series
- Hyouka (2012)
- Live action film
- Hyouka: Forbidden Secrets (2017)

Hyouka (Japanese: 氷菓, Hepburn: Hyōka; lit. "Ice cream") is a 2001 Japanese mystery novel written by Honobu Yonezawa. It is the first volume of the Classic Literature Club (古典部, Koten-bu) series. Five additional volumes have been published between 2002 and 2016. A manga adaptation drawn by Taskohna began serialization in the March 2012 issue of Kadokawa Shoten's Shōnen Ace. A 22-episode anime adaptation produced by Kyoto Animation and directed by Yasuhiro Takemoto aired from April 22 to September 16, 2012. A live-action film, Hyouka: Forbidden Secrets, directed by Mari Asato and starring Kento Yamazaki and Alice Hirose was released on November 3, 2017.

== Plot ==
At the request of his older sister, student Hotaro Oreki joins Kamiyama High School's Classic Literature Club to prevent it from being abolished, joined by fellow members Eru Chitanda, Satoshi Fukube and Mayaka Ibara. The story is set in Kamiyama City, a fictional city in Gifu Prefecture that the author based on his real hometown of Takayama, also in Gifu. The fictional Kamiyama High School is based upon the real life Hida High School. They begin to solve various mysteries, both to help with their club and at Eru's requests.

== Characters ==
=== Main characters ===
Hotaro Oreki (折木 奉太郎, Oreki Hōtarō)
Voiced by: Yūichi Nakamura (Japanese); Adam Gibbs (English)
Played by: Kento Yamazaki
The main protagonist of Hyouka, he is a pragmatic boy who lives by "If I don't have to do something, I won't, but if I have to, I'll do it quickly." He only joins the Classic Literature Club at the request of his older sister, Tomoe Oreki, to prevent it from being dissolved. He says he doesn't like to waste energy, but if given a mystery to consider, he will see it through until it is solved with his brilliant logical deductions. However, he does not like to be told about his talent for deductions and continues to claim he was "just lucky". To him, Eru is "someone he can't ignore," hinting he may have feelings for her. At her urging, he soon finds himself more involved with high school life.
Eru Chitanda (千反田 える, Chitanda Eru)
Voiced by: Satomi Satō (Japanese); Madeleine Morris (English)
Played by: Alice Hirose
An inquisitive girl who joins the Classic Literature Club. Eru's catchphrase is "I'm curious!" ("I have to know!" in the English dub). Although her memory is excellent and she earns top grades in school, she is easily distracted and relies on Oreki's reasoning abilities. An energetic girl, she is well-versed in the town traditions and etiquette, having come from a lineage of wealthy farmers. Whenever a mystery is brought to her attention, she is unable to stop thinking about it. She holds great admiration for Oreki, for whom it is hinted she has developed feelings. She often praises Oreki for his deductive talent and ability to solve almost any problem.
Satoshi Fukube (福部 里志, Fukube Satoshi)
Voiced by: Daisuke Sakaguchi (Japanese); Dallas Reid (English)
Played by: Amane Okayama
Hotaro's classmate who joins the Classic Literature Club with him. He is proud of his impressive memory, referring to himself as a human "database", and wears a perpetual grin. Although he always urges Oreki to participate more in life, he is also secretly jealous of Oreki for his critical reasoning abilities. He mocks Oreki when he performs an energy-consuming task. He calls Mayaka Ibara by her first name, which indicates the two are close. Later on, Satoshi develops feelings for Mayaka, but doesn't want to become "obsessed" with her. He begins to date Mayaka in the spring of their second year.
Mayaka Ibara (伊原 摩耶花, Ibara Mayaka)
Voiced by: Ai Kayano (Japanese); Jill Harris (English)
Played by: Fujiko Kojima
The fourth member of the Classic Literature Club; she joined after the other three. She and the boys attended the same middle school. She doesn't get along well with Hotaro though their relationship starts to improve after she befriends Eru. Mayaka has a passion for drawing manga and is also a member of the school's manga club, though she is extremely reluctant about expressing the fact, often shushing others when mentioning the word "cosplay". Mayaka has long harbored romantic feelings towards Satoshi, who has always treated her in a frivolous way. She later begins to date Satoshi. She refers to Satoshi as Fuku-chan.

=== Class 2-F students ===
Fuyumi Irisu (入須 冬実, Irisu Fuyumi)
Voiced by: Yukana (Japanese); Alexis Tipton (English)
A friend of Eru. A beautiful and queenly girl known by her nickname Jotei (女帝, "empress"). She is an expert at manipulating others, but envies Chitanda for her naivete. She leads her class members in making an independent film for Kan'ya Festival.
Kurako Eba (江波 倉子, Eba Kurako)
Voiced by: Aoi Yūki (Japanese); Jad Saxton (English)
A close friend of Hongō's. She seems shy and reserved, and also describes Hongō as "diligent, careful, has a strong sense of responsibility, ridiculously kind, and easily moved."
Junya Nakajo (中城 順哉, Nakajō Jun'ya)
Voiced by: Takayuki Kondō (Japanese); Alejandro Saab (English)
Assistant Director in Class 2-F's independent film. He was one of the three detectives involved in solving the mystery of Hongō's unfinished script.
Tomohiro Haba (羽場 智博, Haba Tomohiro)
Voiced by: Atsushi Abe (Japanese); Daman Mills (English)
The Props Master in Class 2-F's independent film. He also was one of the three detectives involved in solving the mystery of Hongō's unfinished script.
Misaki Sawakiguchi (沢木口 美崎, Sawakiguchi Misaki)
Voiced by: Mariya Ise (Japanese); Sarah Wiedenheft (English)
The Publicity Manager in Class 2-F's independent film. She was one of the three detectives involved in solving the mystery of Hongō's unfinished script. Her name was earlier seen on the list of girls who'd checked a certain book out from the school library for a single afternoon each. She further appears in the festival's Cooking Contest, and still later is one of those asked if she'd seen any clue to the theft of Mayaka's Valentine chocolate.
Takeo Kaito (海藤 武雄, Kaitō Takeo)
Voiced by: Katsuyuki Konishi (Japanese); Ricco Fajardo (English)
Jiro Sugimura (杉村 二郎, Sugimura Jirō)
Voiced by: Miyu Irino (Japanese); Austin Tindle (English)
Midori Yamanishi (山西 みどり, Yamanishi Midori)
Voiced by: Ami Koshimizu (Japanese); Tia Ballard (English)
Mamiko Senoue (瀬之上 真美子, Senoue Mamiko)
Voiced by: Ryō Hirohashi (Japanese); Brittney Karbowski (English)
Takeo Katsuta (勝田 竹男, Katsuta Takeo)
Voiced by: Yūki Tai (Japanese); Aaron Dismuke (English)
Yuri Konosu (鴻巣 友里, Kōnosu Yuri)
Voiced by: Minori Chihara (Japanese); Megan Shipman (English)

=== Other characters ===
Tomoe Oreki (折木 供恵, Oreki Tomoe)
Voiced by: Satsuki Yukino (Japanese); Caitlin Glass (English)
Hotaro's bold older sister who returns from traveling around the world. A former Classic Literature Club member that suggested Hotaro join the club. She always teases him for being so introverted. She has great deductive powers that may be equal or even greater than her brother Hotaro, as shown when she correctly deduces Fuyumi Irisu's intentions behind the independent film incident.
Yoko Itoigawa (糸魚川 養子, Itoigawa Yōko)
Voiced by: Mami Koyama (Japanese); Linda Young (English)
The school's 49 (61 in the anime) year old teacher-librarian and was the Classic Literature Club's first president the year after the incident regarding Jun Sekitani.
Jun Sekitani (関谷 純, Sekitani Jun)
Played by: Kanata Hongō
An unsung tragic hero of Kamiyama School's past. He is Eru Chitanda's uncle, who went missing while traveling, and is presumed dead. Forced to be the scapegoat for a school protest, he took on the full burden and was expelled. He was the president of the Classic Literature Club and the writer for the anthology "Hyouka". The title means "frozen treat" in Japanese, but actually refers to the English words "ice cream": it is a pun on "I scream", thus revealing Jun's silent anguish. He is thought to be lost in India and is later declared legally dead by the authorities for being missing for so many years.
Masashi Togaito (遠垣内 将司, Tōgaito Masashi)
Voiced by: Ryōtarō Okiayu (Japanese); Ian Sinclair (English)
A third-year student at Kamiyama High School and the president of the Newspaper Club. He is a scion of the Tōgaito family, which is regarded for their contributions to the field of education.
Kazuya Tayama (田山 和哉, Kazuya Tayama)
Voiced by: Daisuke Kishio (Japanese); Orion Pitts (English)
A second-year student and he is a member of Magic Club.
Omichi (尾道)
Voiced by: Takumi Yamazaki (Japanese); Phil Parsons (English)
Class A's math teacher. He's described by Satoshi as 'Strict but only because he's strict on himself.'
Koreyuki Tani (谷 惟之, Tani Koreyuki)
Voiced by: Yoshihisa Kawahara (Japanese); Micah Solusod (English)
A first-year who likes to compete with Satoshi.
Shoko Yuasa (湯浅 尚子, Yuasa Shōko)
Voiced by: Naomi Shindō (Japanese); Dawn M. Bennett (English)
The president of the Manga Society.
Ayako Kochi (河内 亜也子, Kōchi Ayako)
Voiced by: Masumi Asano (Japanese); Brina Palencia (English)
A member of the Manga Society and a friend of Shōko.
Haruna Anjo (安城 春菜, Anjō Haruna)
A friend of Ayako and the writer for A Corpse by Evening.
Kaho Jumonji (十文字 かほ, Jūmonji Kaho)
Voiced by: Saori Hayami (Japanese); Apphia Yu (English)
A friend of Eru and a classmate of Satoshi. Her family runs the Arekusu Shrine, where she is a shrine maiden. She is also the only remaining member of the school's Fortune Telling Club.
Jiro Tanabe (田名辺 治朗, Tanabe Jirō)
Voiced by: Jun Fukuyama (Japanese); Dave Trosko (English)
A second-year student at Kamiyama High School and a member of Kan'ya Festival Executive Committee. He is also the background artist for A Corpse by Evening.
Muneyoshi Kugayama (陸山 宗芳, Kugayama Muneyoshi)
Voiced by: Toshiyuki Morikawa (Japanese); Jerry Jewell (English)
A second-year student at Kamiyama High School, and the Student Council President. He is a talented illustrator and the main artist for A Corpse by Evening.
Rie Zenna (善名 梨絵, Zenna Rie)
Voiced by: Aki Toyosaki (Japanese); Alison Viktorin (English)
A relative of Mayaka, and Kayo's older sister. She has a habit of writing names on her own items, not letting her sister use them.
Kayo Zenna (善名 嘉代, Zenna Kayo)
Voiced by: Yui Ogura (Japanese); Lara Woodhull (English)
Rie's younger sister, who is quieter and meeker than her. Unlike Rie, she doesn't write her name on her items.

== Media ==
=== Novels ===
Hyouka is the first novel in the Classic Literature Club (古典部, Koten-bu) series, written by Honobu Yonezawa and published by Kadokawa Shoten on October 31, 2001. As of November 30, 2016, six volumes (novels and short story collections) have been published in the series. A seventh novel has been confirmed by the author on Twitter. Short stories are published in Kadokawa Shoten's Yasei Jidai magazine. Each of the novels has an English subtitle, most of which reference other detective novels. A book titled Honobu Yonezawa and the Classic Literature Club (米澤穂信と古典部, Yonezawa Honobu to Kotenbu), featuring interviews with Yonezawa and others involved in the series, a new short story, and other reference material was released on October 13, 2017.

No.	Title	Release date	ISBN
1	Hyouka: You can't escape / The niece of time Hyōka (氷菓)	October 31, 2001	978-4-04-427101-5
2	The Credit Roll of the Fool: Why didn't she ask Eba? Gusha no Endorōru (愚者のエンドロール)	July 31, 2002	978-4-04-427102-2
3	The Kudryavka Sequence: Welcome to Kanya Festa! Kudoryafuka no Junban (クドリャフカの順番)	June 30, 2005	978-4-04-427103-9
4	The Doll that Took a Detour: Little birds can remember Tōmawari Suru Hina (遠まわりする雛)	October 3, 2007	978-4-04-427104-6
5	Approximating the Distance between Two People: It walks by past Futari no Kyori no Gaisan (ふたりの距離の概算)	June 25, 2010	978-4-04-100325-1
6	Even Though I'm Told I Now Have Wings: Last seen bearing Imasara Tsubasa to Iwaretemo (いまさら翼といわれても)	November 30, 2016	978-4-04-104761-3

=== Manga ===
A manga adaptation, titled Hyouka and illustrated by Taskohna, started serialization in the March 2012 issue of Kadokawa Shoten's Shōnen Ace. Kadokawa Shoten published 17 tankōbon volumes from April 26, 2012 to March 26, 2026. The manga's first twelve volumes adapted the first four novels, same as the anime series. A sequel series started in the August 2019 issue of Shōnen Ace.

No.	Release date	ISBN
1	April 24, 2012	978-4-04-120270-8
2	August 23, 2012	978-4-04-120271-5
3	January 24, 2013	978-4-04-120272-2
4	June 21, 2013	978-4-04-120740-6
5	September 24, 2013	978-4-04-120882-3
6	April 26, 2014	978-4-04-121096-3
7	July 26, 2014	978-4-04-101749-4
8	January 26, 2015	978-4-04-101750-0
9	August 26, 2015	978-4-04-103588-7
10	July 26, 2016	978-4-04-103589-4
11	October 26, 2017	978-4-04-103590-0
12	May 25, 2019	978-4-04-103591-7
13	November 25, 2020	978-4-04-109730-4
14	March 25, 2022	978-4-04-112386-7
15	July 25, 2023	978-4-04-114116-8
16	October 25, 2024	978-4-04-115666-7
17	March 26, 2026	978-4-041-17259-9

=== Anime ===
In 2012, a television anime series based on the Classic Literature Club series novels aired in Japan. It was produced by Kyoto Animation, covering four volumes of the novel.

== Reception ==
In October 2017, it was reported that the novels have 2.05 million copies in print.
