= Riho (given name) =

Unisex given name

Riho is both an Estonian masculine given name and a Japanese feminine given name. Notable people with the name include:

== Estonia ==
- Riho Breivel (born 1952), Estonian politician
- Riho Kuld (born 1936), Estonian sculptor and rower
- Riho Lahi (1904–1995), Estonian writer
- Riho Päts (1899–1977), Estonian composer, choir director, music journalist and music teacher
- Riho Sibul (1958–2022), Estonian musician
- Riho Suun (born 1960), Estonian cyclist
- Riho Terras (born 1967), Estonian military commander
- Riho Terras (mathematician) (1939–2005), Estonian-American mathematician
- Riho Ühtegi (born 1964), Estonian brigadier general
- Riho Unt (born 1956), Estonian animated film director, scenarist, and artist
- Riho Västrik (born 1965), Estonian filmmaker, producer, screenwriter, journalist and historian

== Japan ==
- Riho (里歩; born 1997), Japanese professional wrestler
- Riho Abiru (阿比留 李帆; born 1993), Japanese former idol of the idol group SKE48
- Riho Furui (ふるい りほ; born 1991), Japanese singer and songwriter
- Riho Iida (飯田 里穂; born 1991), Japanese ex-child model-turned-actress, voice actress and singer
- Riho Makise (牧瀬 里穂; born 1971), Japanese actress
- Riho Miaki (三秋 里歩; born 1994), Japanese YouTuber
- Riho Nakajima (中島 理帆; born 1978), Japanese former synchronized swimmer
- Riho Otake (大竹 里歩; born 1993), Japanese volleyball player
- Riho Sakamoto (坂本 理保; born 1992), Japanese footballer
- Riho Sayashi (鞘師 里保; born 1998), Japanese actress, singer and dancer
- Riho Sugiyama (杉山 里穂), Japanese voice actress
- Riho Takada (高田 里穂; born 1994), Japanese actress and model
- Riho Yoshioka (吉岡 里帆; born 1993), Japanese actress
- Riho Yoshioka (吉岡 里帆; born 1993), Japanese actress
