= List of Nichijou episodes =

Nichijou DVD volume 1 cover

Nichijou is a 2011 Japanese anime television series produced by Kyoto Animation based on the comedy manga by Keiichi Arawi. The series is directed by Tatsuya Ishihara and aired in Japan from April 3, 2011, to September 26, 2011. It was also simulcasted by Crunchyroll (which was independently owned at the time) under the name My Ordinary Life. Prior to the airing of the anime series, an original video animation (OVA), titled Nichijou Episode 0, shipped with the sixth manga volume on March 12, 2011. Initially licensed by Bandai Entertainment in North America, Funimation later licensed the series and released it on February 7, 2017, with subtitles and again with an English dub on July 23, 2019. In March 2022, the Funimation produced English dub of Nichijou became available on Crunchyroll, who acquired from its later owner AT&T in 2021 by parent company Sony Pictures Television, who in turn acquired Funimation in 2018 and was itself renamed that same month.

For the first 13 episodes in the first broadcast, the opening theme song is "Hyadain no Kakakata Kataomoi - C" (ヒャダインのカカカタ☆カタオモイ-C; lit. "Hyadain's U-u-u-u☆unrequited Love - C") by Hyadain, while the ending theme song is "Zzz" by Sayaka Sasaki. For episodes 14 onwards, the opening theme is "Hyadain no Jōjō Yūjō" (ヒャダインのじょーじょーゆーじょー, Hyadain's Amazing Friendship) by Hyadain and its ending song varies every episode.

== Episode list ==
No. overall	No. in season	Title	Directed by	Written by	Original release date
OVA	1	"Nichijou Episode 0"; Transliteration: "Nichijou no Zero-wa" (Japanese: 日常の0話)	Kazuya Sakamoto	Jukki Hanada	March 12, 2011
At Tokisadame High School, Yūko Aioi scores a single point on her math test, while her friend Mio Naganohara desperately tries to console her by mentioning that she managed to overcome a great challenge. As Yūko begins to undermine her potential, Mio tells Yūko that she has innate talent, leading Yūko to fall for it hook, line and sinker. When Yūko folds her math test into a paper plane for the purpose of escapism, the paper plane fails to fly into the trash can. At the Shinonome Lab, child scientist Hakase catches a cold, but she refuses to take medicine suggested by her android Nano Shinonome. The talking black cat Sakamoto advises Nano to mix the medicine in Hakase's favorite snack, but Nano only sprinkles the medicine on top of a plate of pudding. Regardless, Hakase eats the entire pudding. At the empty railway platform, Yūko, Mio and their friend Mai Minakami wait for the next train to arrive. After boarding the train, Mai, Mio and Yūko respectively lie down on the overhead rack, bench and floor, treating it like a triple bunk bed.
1	2	"Nichijou Episode 1"; Transliteration: "Nichijou no Dai-ichi-wa" (Japanese: 日常の第一話)	Tatsuya Ishihara	Jukki Hanada	April 3, 2011
Outside the Shinonome Lab, a calico cat runs off with Nano's grilled fish. While chasing after the calico cat, Nano causes an explosion when she runs into Teruhiko Katashina, a male student wearing headphones. As Yūko and Mio walk to school, Yūko is gradually pelted by a wooden doll, a red cow and a piece of raw salmon. Nano finds herself on a rooftop with her chopsticks, right slipper and left hand all missing. During lunch break, Yūko goes through great lengths to keep her sausage from being sullied. The sausage slips out of Yūko's hand, through the mohawk of Tsuyoshi Nakanojō, past Mai's baseball glove, off the school lockers and onto the floor. However, Yūko still eats the sausage, much to Mio's disappointment. During a school assembly, the Principal cracks dull jokes, and Mai giggles when she sees a squid tentacle on the back of Yūko's head. English teacher and school counselor Izumi Sakurai requests that the students should not bring goats to school. Coming from a family of farmers, Kōjirō Sasahara makes a scene, but he is reprimanded by Misato Tachibana. Later, Nano wishes to be more normal and begs Hakase to remove the giant wind-up key from her back. When Hakase twists the wind-up key, Nano's big toe is revealed to have a USB port inside when it ejects from her foot and crashes into a wall. Hakase refuses to remove the wind-up key because it looks cute on Nano.
2	3	"Nichijou Episode 2"; Transliteration: "Nichijou no Dai-ni-wa" (Japanese: 日常の第二話)	Taichi Ishidate	Jukki Hanada	April 11, 2011
After running late for school, Mio is ultimately chased by a student wearing a bear mask, only to discover that her older sister Yoshino Naganohara was playing a prank on her. Meanwhile, Nano returns to the Shinonome Lab after picking up creamy milk from the grocery store. Nano is shocked when Hakase dispenses a roll cake from Nano's forearm and a sweet bun from Nano's forehead. When Hakase wants to have a log cake, she just gets it from the refrigerator. Nano begs Hakase to put all the desserts in the refrigerator, but Hakase stubbornly refuses to do so. Later, Mio lends her math notebook to Yūko, only to remember that she forgot to erase an erotic sketch of Kōjirō. After Mio makes several attempts to retrieve her math notebook, a heated chase ensues in the school hallway. Mio manages to snatch the math notebook from Yūko after tripping and tumbling ahead of her. As Mio hands in her math notebook to math teacher Akagi, she realizes that she still forgot to erase the erotic sketch of Kōjirō. In a classroom, Misako urges Kōjirō to take the cultural festival committee more seriously, but he does not pay attention to her even when she shoots him with various firearms. Kōjirō goes to the restroom, coming up with an idea for the cultural festival. When he returns to the classroom, he sees her wearing a bear mask out of embarrassment.
3	4	"Nichijou Episode 3"; Transliteration: "Nichijou no Dai-san-wa" (Japanese: 日常の第三話)	Hiroko Utsumi	Jukki Hanada	April 18, 2011
On the way to school, Yūko is seemingly ignored by Mai when she passes by. Believing that Mai is giving her the silent treatment, Yūko apologizes for eating Mai's food and destroying Mai's Buddha statue. Surprisingly, Mai was listening to music through her earbuds this entire time. During class, Yūko forgets to complete her math worksheet, begging to copy off of Mai's math worksheet. After receiving two pieces of paper which feature a comic about a boy named Masao running late for school, Yūko is upset when Mai's math worksheet is completely different from Yūko's math worksheet. Akagi asks the students to solve a math problem that he wrote on the chalkboard. Yūko reluctantly gets an arm cramp from raising her hand, and her gurgling stomach causes other students to compare the sound to a vibrating alert on a smartphone. Meanwhile, Nano encounters a stray black cat in an alleyway on her way back home from grocery shopping. When Nano arrives at the Shinonome Lab, she is surprised to see the black cat with Hakase. After Hakase and Nano take turns petting the black cat, Hakase names the black cat Sakamoto and makes a special red scarf which will allow Sakamoto to speak. However, Sakamoto only speaks in a rather condescending tone, though he humbly apologizes when Nano threatens to kick him out. Later, Yūko and Mai have an intense arm wrestling match over snacks and juice, with Mio serving as referee. Yūko loses twenty-three times against Mai.
4	5	"Nichijou Episode 4"; Transliteration: "Nichijou no Dai-yon-wa" (Japanese: 日常の第四話)	Mitsuyoshi Yoneda	Jukki Hanada	April 25, 2011
After the Principal advises Izumi to be stricter with enforcing the school rules to the students, Izumi tells Kōjirō to stop eating his steak and Misato to stop carrying a machine gun around in the school hallway. While shopping at the grocery store, Nano is pressured into purchasing a cheap snowman and is forced into allowing Hakase to buy one snack. At the Shinonome Lab, Nano makes shaved ice from the snowman, while Hakase eats her snack and draws a snowman with a crayon. Unfortunately, they forgot to buy food for Sakamoto. During class, the students take their midterm exams, but Yūko is shocked when Mai stands on her desk, strikes a reclining Buddha pose on the school lockers and removes her supposed wig. It turns out that Mai was wearing a bald cap under her wig. Nano dries pickled plums in the garden, but it is too sour for Sakamoto to eat. Hakase pranks Sakamoto with a mousetrap gum and teases him with a foxtail. Sakamoto plays with an eraser when Hakase goes to the restroom, but he lies about taking a nap when she returns. On a hill, Yūko makes a joke about the book that Mai is reading. This eventually pivots to Mai confessing her feelings for Yūko, which leaves Yūko flabbergasted. However, Mai was only kidding, leading Yūko into frustration as she does not know how to process Mai's joke.
5	6	"Nichijou Episode 5"; Transliteration: "Nichijou no Dai-go-wa" (Japanese: 日常の第五話)	Naoko Yamada	Jukki Hanada	May 2, 2011
Refusing to believe in mediums, Tsuyoshi travels to a summit of a mountain, where he meets an elderly medium. After numerous attempts to disprove the medium, Tsuyoshi notices that the medium owns some consumer goods. However, Tsuyoshi avoids giving a gratuity for her services and dashes off, only for her to bolt after him. In the study hall, Yūko and Mai play rock paper scissors, but Mai does not follow the rules of the game exactly. It turns out that Mai did not feel like playing rock paper scissors in the first place. While Nano heads to the library in order to return some books, Hakase tries to paint a missing eye on Nano's Daruma doll, but Sakamoto makes it worse by suggesting Hakase to paint sunglasses on the Daruma doll. When Nano returns home, she is speechless when Hakase pretends to give birth to the altered Daruma doll. After class, Yūko requests to sketch an amateur drawing of a cool guy for Izumi's next English test. This catches the attention of Mio, who is stunned that Izumi likes Yūko's amateur drawings. When Mio sketches professional drawings of a cool guy, Izumi still prefers Yūko's amateur drawings. In her anger and absentmindedness, Mio accidentally sketches an erotic drawing of Kōjirō. Unfortunately for Mio, Izumi uses the erotic drawing of Kōjirō as part of the next English test.
6	7	"Nichijou Episode 6"; Transliteration: "Nichijou no Dai-roku-wa" (Japanese: 日常の第六話)	Yoshiji Kigami	Maiko Nishioka	May 9, 2011
During class, Yūko and Mio challenge each other with a game of picture word chain, though Mio becomes increasingly shocked at Yūko's consistent spelling errors. While being punished by standing in the school hallway, Yūko bears witness to an intense battle between the Principal and a deer in the school courtyard. After the deer headbutts the Principal several times, the Principal performs a suplex on the deer, which seemingly ends the battle. Yūko later sees the Principal using rope as a leash for the deer. At the Shinonome Lab, Nano catches a cockroach under a wooden bowl, but she panics when she tries to come up with an idea to dispose of the cockroach. After Nano fails to lift up the wooden bowl so Sakamoto could attack the cockroach, Hakase purposely whacks Nano on the head. Hakase cries when Nano expresses hatred, but they embrace when Nano expresses forgiveness, though this inadvertently causes Nano to lift up the wooden bowl in distraction. Yūko, Mio and Mai camp near a rocky stream. Both Yūko and Mio end up ruining their cooked curry and rice by accident, and their consternation skyrockets when Mai releases a trout that she catches while fly fishing. Later at night, Yūko, Mio and Mai snuggle up in sleeping bags inside their tent. While Mai reads a book, Yūko is surprised that Mio brought a bottle of vinegar instead a bottle of liquor, though Yūko and Mio are dumbstruck when Mai already finished a bottle of cider.
7	8	"Nichijou Episode 7"; Transliteration: "Nichijou no Dai-nana-wa" (Japanese: 日常の第七話)	Noriyuki Kitanohara	Katsuhiko Muramoto	May 16, 2011
Inside an airship called the Fey Kingdom, soldiers kidnap King Albert and pursue Princess Starla for a man named Dolph, who seeks the two Wooden Cubes. After confiscating one Wooden Cube from Albert, Dolph menacingly approaches Starla for the other Wooden Cube. Unfortunately, Dolph trips to his death, allowing Starla to regain control of the soldiers. One of the soldiers finds both of the Wooden Cubes laying on the floor unguarded, but he accidentally knocks them out of the airship window when he sneezes during a smoking break. It is revealed that Yūko was daydreaming about how Mio got her hair clips. Japanese teacher Manabu Takasaki has conflicted thoughts about his unrequited love for Izumi in the workplace. As Manabu wonders about Izumi's favorite things, he absentmindedly asks her if she is single. When Izumi gives the affirmative, the two of them exchange pleasantries, encouraging Manabu to do push-ups in the middle of the school hallway. In the streets, Yoshino teases Nano by detaching her right arm and asking her some riddles. When Yoshino detaches Nano's wind-up key from her back, Nano finds herself in a state of bliss, but Nano does not notice when Yoshino reattaches the wind-up key on her back. Afterwards, Sakamoto eventually suggests for Nano and Hakase to play catch in the baseball field. Nano goes to the outfield and retrieves her thrown baseball from a gentleman after she sees Yūko, Mio and Mai walking home from school nearby.
8	9	"Nichijou Episode 8"; Transliteration: "Nichijou no Dai-hachi-wa" (Japanese: 日常の第八話)	Yasuhiro Takemoto	Maiko Nishioka	May 23, 2011
On the morning of a very warm day, Nano waters her garden outside, but her right fist suddenly blasts off from her outstretched right arm. On the way to school, Yūko makes clever weather and nature puns, but she is devastated when Mio and Mai are unamused. The classroom shows that Yūko, Mio and Mai are absent. On a train, Yūko is red with embarrassment while Mio and Mai continue being unamused. Misato finds Kōjirō on the school rooftop and confronts him about littering his handkerchief, but Kōjirō explains that he accidentally dropped it. Despite having different routes to school, Misato is flustered when she reveals that she found the handkerchief on the streets near Kōjirō's house. Suddenly, Nano's fist charges straight towards Misato's head. Misato's classmates Weboshī and Fe, who witnessed the whole ordeal, have no idea what to do with Nano's fist in their possession. Yūko, Mio and Mai become trapped in an elevator, as Yūko and Mio are sitting down while Mai is lying down. They feel bored and hopeless. As Yūko and Mio begin playing a game of word chain associated with fruits, they burst into a fit of laughter, but Mai trembles in paralysis. At the Shinonome Lab, Nano scolds Hakase for eating a snack before bedtime. Though telling Hakase that she must brush her teeth before bedtime, Nano is upset upon learning that robots cannot get cavities. However, Hakase consoles Nano by promising to give her a cavity feature.
9	10	"Nichijou Episode 9"; Transliteration: "Nichijou no Dai-kyū-wa" (Japanese: 日常の第九話)	Hiroko Utsumi	Katsuhiko Muramoto	May 30, 2011
In the morning, Mio gets angry when Yoshino pulls a prank by putting a knight shogi piece in Mio's Mont Blanc and a king shogi piece in Mio's strawberry shortcake. At an udon and soba restaurant, Yūko impatiently waits on the waitress to serve her the summer veggie tempura special some time after Mio and Mai already receive their herring soba and zaru soba. Unable to sleep at night due to pesky mosquitoes buzzing around in her bedroom, Yūko swats many of them by clapping vigorously. Yūko's mother angrily enters the bedroom and propels Yūko towards her desk with a slap on the cheek. This surprisingly swats a mosquito, but another one soon buzzes over Yūko's head. At the Shinonome Lab, Nano scolds Hakase for eating a month's worth of popsicles before hardly eating an omurice. Although Nano plans on withholding Hakase from getting a strawberry juice box unless Hakase removes the wind-up key from Nano's back, Hakase ends up getting another strawberry juice box and popsicle from the refrigerator, much to Nano's annoyance. Yoshino tricks Mio into taking up a part-time job as a daifuku mascot for Tsuyoshi's father, who is a vendor. Mio is very embarrassed by the design of the costume. Tsuyoshi's father ends up taking over as the mascot while Mio manages the food booth, where a male customer asks the price of a daifuku. Having witnessed Tsuyoshi's father being held at gunpoint by a policeman, Mio just gives the male customer a daifuku for free.
10	11	"Nichijou Episode 10"; Transliteration: "Nichijou no Dai-jū-wa" (Japanese: 日常の第十話)	Mitsuyoshi Yoneda	Chizuru Segawa	June 6, 2011
Running late for school, Yūko finds herself unable to enter the classroom due to various chalkboard erasers, which Mai has planted as booby traps. Yūko eventually enters the classroom and takes a chalkboard eraser to the head, only to realize that the class is being held in a different classroom. Haruna Annaka goes to the park at noon in order to try some flowing noodles. However, Haruna is disappointed when a mad woman gives her used chopsticks and drops down a baseball and a bunch of raw noodles down the narrow bamboo flume as transient humor. A flowing noodle expert named Egi Masaharu approaches the woman, who slides down the flume. Haruna is left discombobulated when the woman still accepts Egi, who spent thirty years of his life and spent all of his savings in search of the perfect flowing noodles yet all for naught. At the Shinonome Lab, Nano compliments how mature Hakase looks with a ponytail. Sakamoto is annoyed when Hakase lays a magazine over him like a blanket, while Nano is worried when Hakase turns on the dryer instead of the washer. Hakase urges to help Nano flip a fried egg, but it lands on Sakamoto's head. When Sakamoto lies that mature people cannot eat snacks, Hakase undoes her ponytail in a panic. In her bedroom, Yūko avoids studying by deeply pondering about her future. She temporarily changes her mind after her mother barges in and attacks her for banging on the floor.
11	12	"Nichijou Episode 11"; Transliteration: "Nichijou no Dai-jū-ichi-wa" (Japanese: 日常の第十一話)	Kazuya Sakamoto	Jukki Hanada	June 13, 2011
After having recovered from a three-day cold at night, Yūko is reminded by her mother that she has a final exam the following morning. With only ten hours until the final exam for English and music, Yūko ends up writing imaginative poems. In an effort to catch a cold again, Yūko does everything possible to keep her body shivering. However, she appears to be perfectly healthy the following morning. She heats the thermometer with a match to an extremely high temperature and feigns having a fever, though her mother does not believe this. The Vice Principal notices that he ran out of string to make a straw doll, though this escalates into a chain of bad memories of his checkered past. When his daughter Kimiko and his grandson Mi come over to visit, the Vice Principal is soon pestered by Mi to eat a ball of dirt resembling a chocolate dumpling. At the Shinonome Lab, Hakase makes a large tube of superglue in order to trap Sakamato in the hallway. This backfires when Hakase gets stuck in a sticky situation while Sakamoto gasps for air after being drenched in superglue. When Nano comes home from grocery shopping, she also gets immobilized as her detachable hands are glued to the floor. During a beautiful day, Yūko struggles to maintain composure while trying to take the final exam, eventually reaching a state of serenity. Unfortunately, Yūko is not pleased when Izumi announces that time is up.
12	13	"Nichijou Episode 12"; Transliteration: "Nichijou no Dai-jū-ni-wa" (Japanese: 日常の第十二話)	Noriyuki Kitanohara	Atsushi Itō	June 20, 2011
Yūko walks to school in a cheerful mood. As she enters the classroom, she panics upon realizing that she left her homework at home. Unable to copy Mio's worksheet this time, Yūko prepares to storm out of the classroom, only to be halted by Manabu. Haruna visits a carnival shooting gallery, where the only prizes are caramels and eggplants. She soon learns that the shooting gallery is rigged when she is able to split open an eggplant, which is wedged onto a nail. At the amusement park, Mio loses Yūko's wallet, and Yūko has a stone-faced expression that turns the atmosphere sepia. Although Mio locates Yūko's wallet at a lost and found, the money inside is gone. Yūko still has a stone-faced expression while Mio enjoys all the attractions. At the Shinonome Lab, Hakase tries to imitate Nano by wearing a harness with a wind-up key. However, Hakase quickly takes off the harness yet still imitates Nano, who then imitates Hakase in a fail attempt to have her wind-up key removed. Hakase throws a tantrum when Nano eats Hakase's snacks. Nano plans to go grocery shopping for dinner, but rejects Hakase's request for more snacks.
13	14	"Nichijou Episode 13"; Transliteration: "Nichijou no Dai-jū-san-wa" (Japanese: 日常の第十三話)	Kazuya Sakamoto	Tatsuya Ishihara	June 27, 2011
In the classroom, Yūko appears feverish as she attempts to perform various magic tricks for Mio. However, Mio notices every flaw in these magic tricks, including a dove that flies out of Yūko's backpack, a wand that is really a bouquet, a coin with a hole in the center and a deck of cards containing only the ace of hearts. As Nano and Hakase head to the supermarket, they pass by a shark castella food booth, where Hakase repeatedly throws a tantrum and begs for an embarrassed Nano to buy a shark castella. Back at the Shinonome Lab, Hakase enjoys her shark castella. As Sakamoto worries that Nano spoils Hakase after every tantrum, Sakamoto questions Hakase's self-control. On a stormy night, a cowl on top of the Shinonome Lab is causing a racket by being knocked around by the wind. Hakase cuddles with Nano, who is already fast asleep and ends up sleep-talking. Declining Sakamoto's offer to escort her to the bathroom, Hakase waits for Nano to wake up and escort her instead. As it is revealed that Nano has astraphobia, Hakase comforts Nano before asking if she wants to attend school, though lightning strikes before Nano could give an answer. On a sunny day, Hakase happily announces that Nano will be attending high school as a transfer student the next day. Nano is overjoyed upon seeing her new school uniform.
14	15	"Nichijou Episode 14"; Transliteration: "Nichijou no Dai-jū-yon-wa" (Japanese: 日常の第十四話)	Yoshiji Kigami	Jukki Hanada	July 4, 2011
Nano admires her new school uniform upon trying it on and gathers her school supplies. Before heading out, Nano tells a sulking Hakase that she will be home around five o'clock from grocery shopping after school. Upon realizing that she might not seem normal due to the wind-up key on her back, Nano enters Izumi's classroom, where all the students stare with their mouth gaping and their eyes agog. In the go-soccer meeting room, club president Kenzaburō Daiku and club member Yuria Sekiguchi are approached by Makoto Sakurai, who wants to join the club. Although Kenzaburō made up this fake sport and intended it to be recreational, Makoto reveals that he was the most valuable player in a go-soccer club during middle school. Kenzaburō and Yuria are given a demonstration by Makoto on how to actually play go-soccer. During lunch break, Mio gets really angry at Yūko for giving her fried mackerel instead of fried noodles. To make matters worse, Mio only has an Argentine peso in her wallet, so she cannot buy another lunch. The constant bickering between Yūko and Mio escalates into a violent explosion. They eventually reconcile as Yūko calls Mio smart and as Mio calls Yūko positive. In the evening, Nano says that she had an amazing first day of school, but Hakase still will not remove Nano's wind-up key from her back.
15	16	"Nichijou Episode 15"; Transliteration: "Nichijou no Dai-jū-go-wa" (Japanese: 日常の第十五話)	Noriyuki Kitanohara	Taichi Ishidate	July 11, 2011
Yūko and Mio are caught off guard when Nano uses an abacus as an attempt to solve a math problem. After Nano pulls out a thermos of soup from her backpack, Mai offers Nano a can of engine oil and a monkey wrench, both of which Nano puts in her backpack. However, Mai manages to videotape Nano extracting a loose screw from her mouth when Yūko and Mio are distracted. Science teacher Kana Nakamura, who is fixated on Nano's robotic nature, offers a cup of coffee to Nano when she brings a stack of textbooks. Although Kana secretly laced the coffee with a sedative, Nano drinks all of it with no effect, while Kana accidentally drinks some of it and eventually faints. Upon returning home, Nano begs Hakase to remove the wind-up key from her back since it is negatively impacting her school life. Nano is in utter shock and anger when her right hand conceals a gun barrel loaded with soybeans, her left hand conceals a tube of chikuwa, her forehead conceals a cuckoo clock and her head conceals a toaster with two bread slices. In the school hallway, Manabu has conflicting thoughts as he witnesses Izumi trying to button up Makoto's shirt. Manabu soon learns from Haruna that Izumi and Makoto are actually siblings. Nano begs Hakase to remove the wind-up key from her back, but Nano unfortunately learns that Hakase installed a funny bone feature which overexaggerates Nano's reactions from Hakase's jokes.
16	17	"Nichijou Episode 16"; Transliteration: "Nichijou no Dai-jū-roku-wa" (Japanese: 日常の第十六話)	Yasuhiro Takemoto	Jukki Hanada	July 18, 2011
At the reopened local coffeehouse, Yūko struggles to order coffee due to the confusing menu. After the employee Tamamura explains that the espresso varies in size, temperature and shot amount, Yūko is in disarray when she orders a tiny green cup of bitter espresso. Yūko leaves the coffeehouse as it begins to rain, choosing to buy her coffee from a vending machine from now on. In front of a bunch of cigarette machines, Yūko and Mio are approached by a policeman, who suspects that Mio is the culprit behind putting counterfeit money in the cigarette machines. The policeman confiscates Mio's beige tote bag, which contains a yaoi manga starring Kōjirō. Mio freaks out and prevents her yaoi manga from being viewed by anyone. While doing homework at the local burger bar, Yūko plays a guessing game with Mio and Mai, who try to figure out which one of Yūko's closed fists is holding an eraser. However, the eraser is revealed to be hidden inside Yūko's right hand when Mai eventually tricks Yūko into playing rock paper scissors. Later on, Yūko visits the Shinonome Lab, where Hakase greets Yūko inside. Although Yūko quickly befriends Hakase, Nano is in full panic when Hakase basically exposes Nano of being a robot, dispensing tea from her left arm and concealing a gun barrel in her right arm. Before leaving, Yūko calmly tells Nano that she is herself regardless of being a robot. Nano invites Yūko to visit her anytime.
17	18	"Nichijou Episode 17"; Transliteration: "Nichijou no Dai-jū-nana-wa" (Japanese: 日常の第十七話)	Naoko Yamada	Maiko Nishioka	July 25, 2011
At the Shinonome Lab, Sakamoto misplaces his red scarf, only to realize that Hakase gave it to a triangular crow named Karasu. Although Nano tells Hakase to return Sakamoto's red scarf, Hakase jokes around with her robot invention Biscuit #1, who can eject his right arm and launch his head. However, Karasu later zips off into the sky with the red scarf, much to Sakamoto's irateness. Sitting around a kotatsu, Yūko and Mio build a house of cards to near completion. They are unable to stack the final two cards when Nano ends up dozing off and Mai plays with her white cat Chitchi. Unfortunately for Yūko and Mio, a square ceiling light fixture falls on top of the kotatsu and demolishes the house of cards. In the school hallway, Makoto blackmails Manabu into being the go-soccer club adviser, lest everyone at school will be aware of Manabu's crush on Izumi. Yūko enters Manabu's classroom, determined to avoid calling out Mai's endless cycle of jokes. With one joke after another, including when afro sporting student Tanaka calls out Mai for wearing double glasses, Yūko finally gives into temptation when Mai recites an excerpt from her textbook while secretly looking at a manga, leading Yūko to cry out that Mai has memorized it. The cry is heard throughout the country, but Yūko reaches a state of bliss for calling out Mai's last joke.
18	19	"Nichijou Episode 18"; Transliteration: "Nichijou no Dai-jū-hachi-wa" (Japanese: 日常の第十八話)	Hiroko Utsumi	Katsuhiko Muramoto	August 1, 2011
At the coffeehouse, Mio flawlessly orders a grande white chocolate mocha frappuccino with various toppings, while Yūko leaves in tears from remembering her struggle with ordering coffee. On the school rooftop, Misato scolds Kōjirō for skipping cleaning duty, but Misato blushes when Kōjirō mentions that he appreciates her looking out for him. Taking a train to a neighboring town, Yūko plans to meet up with Mai at the burger bar. Due to a series of misunderstandings, Yūko is repeatedly laughed at by a young girl named Mihoshi Tachibana, who is meeting her older sister Misato at the burger bar. Mai shows up wearing a full suit of armor and wants to go trick-or-treating with Yūko, who then wears nose glasses. Misato recalls that Halloween was a week ago, while Mihoshi bursts out laughing again. Later outside of a house, Yūko and Mai are told by a woman that Halloween is over already, leading Yūko and Mai to walk away in silence. At the Shinonome Lab, Hakase presents her latest robot invention Biscuit #2, whose special ability is speed reading, though Nano is not impressed. Biscuit #2 is soon ignored when Nano tell Hakase how awesome she really is. In the Fey Kingdom, many soldiers fail to entertain Starla for prize money. When one soldier chickens out from doing a cheerleading routine, he throws his blue pom-poms out the airship window. It is revealed that Yūko was daydreaming about how Mio got her fuzzy pigtails.
19	20	"Nichijou Episode 19"; Transliteration: "Nichijou no Dai-jū-kyū-wa" (Japanese: 日常の第十九話)	Hiroko Utsumi	Atsushi Itō	August 8, 2011
During a downpour, Misato, Weboshī and Fe wait under an awning near a crosswalk. Deciding to entertain Misato and Weboshī, Fe falls face-first into a puddle, getting her school uniform all wet and dirty. Yūko helps Mio correctly perform a high jump by lowering the bar. After many attempts, Mio accidentally headbutts Yūko, who retaliates by headbutting Mio and somehow pushing her over the bar. During a downpour, Nano arrives home, only to find Hakase wearing a raincoat next to the clothes line full of wet laundry, which has been knocked to the ground. As Nano picks up the wet laundry, Hakase instantly puts the blame on Sakamoto. Nano withholds making an omurice for dinner until Hakase quickly admits the truth. Mio and Mai learn from Yūko that the two forgot to make a clay self-portrait for homework. During a downpour, they are forced to seek shelter on the steps of a Shinto shrine. They endure a domino effect of bad luck nearly destroying the Shinto shrine when Yūko rings the suzu. An elderly monk approaches the Shinto shrine in rage as he accidentally steps on Yūko's wet clay self-portrait, causing him to fall on his back and to be nearly struck by the falling torii. Kenzaburō and Yuria serve as referees for a go-soccer match between Makoto and Manabu, though Kenzaburō's friend Ogi also joins the match and performs parkour in a dramatic finish. Kenzaburō and Yuria are left speechless over what they just witnessed.
20	21	"Nichijou Episode 20"; Transliteration: "Nichijou no Dai-ni-jū-wa" (Japanese: 日常の第二十話)	Yoshiji Kigami	Jukki Hanada	August 15, 2011
In Mio's bedroom, Yūko, Mai and Nano help Mio with her yaoi manga that she plans to submit. Unfortunately, Nano embarrassingly cannot handle the steamy content and opts to let off some steam. Moreover, Mai unnecessarily draws Buddhist monk Kūya as well as a graveyard, while Yūko accidentally spills ink on a page and frantically tries to blot out the stain. Yūko attempts to recreate a character's face, while Mai makes up a story about a private born from a peach. Mai recreates the character's face for Yūko, though the art style greatly differs from the rest of the page. When Yūko gives the ink-stained page to Mio, Nano is seen outside on a swing as she overhears Mio telling Yūko that they ran out of drawing paper. At sunset, Misato and Yoshino sit by a riverbank, where Misato tries to convey her heavy thoughts concerning the upcoming kendo national meet. Yoshino does not listen and just gives Misato some spicy rice crackers before leaving. At Shinonome Lab, Nano plays hide-and-seek with Hakase and Sakamoto. After Nano finds Sakamoto under a cardboard box, both of them give up looking for Hakase, who immediately comes out of hiding from a little nook behind the wall. In the evening, Yūko is scolded by Mio, who is in dire need of more drawing paper. As Mio yells at Yūko for not taking her seriously, Mio realizes that Yūko actually did buy more drawing paper. Mio meekly apologizes to Yūko afterwards.
21	22	"Nichijou Episode 21"; Transliteration: "Nichijou no Dai-ni-jū-ichi-wa" (Japanese: 日常の第二十一話)	Eisaku Kawanami	Katsuhiko Muramoto	August 22, 2011
Thinking that she is getting away with not turning in her assignment, Yūko is soon summoned to the faculty room by Manabu after he suddenly smacks her on the head with a notebook, shown by every angle possible. In Misato's bedroom, Misato and Fe learn that Weboshī has a crush on Tsuyoshi because his mohawk gives off a bad boy vibe, but Fe reveals that Tsuyoshi is a nice guy since he enjoys gardening. On the weekend, Manabu bumps into Izumi in the shopping district, where Izumi bought a bunch of cheap green onions. Manabu suggests Izumi go picnicking in the park together. Yūko spots the two and assumes that they are dating. The next day at school, Manabu and Izumi are embarrassed when their names are posted under a love umbrella on the bulletin board, but Izumi says she was happy with it. However, it ends up being just Manabu's fantasy, in reality Manabu awkwardly greetes Yūko and walks away from the two, leaving them confused. Kana stakes out at a supermarket where Nano frequents. Manabu spots Kana and compliments that her boyish clothes look cute, which causes her run away in embarrassment. In the Fey Kingdom, the soldiers manage to find a Wooden Cube, but Mio infiltrates the airship in order to retrieve her Wooden Cube and wreak havoc on the soldiers. One of the soldiers bounces off the walls from a blast and somehow slams into Mio, who plummets down a hole in the airship floor and lands back in the classroom. It is revealed that Yūko was daydreaming about Mio again. Kana styles her short hair with a lopsided pigtail, but she quickly changes her mind.
22	23	"Nichijou Episode 22"; Transliteration: "Nichijou no Dai-ni-jū-ni-wa" (Japanese: 日常の第二十二話)	Yasuhiro Takemoto	Maiko Nishioka	August 29, 2011
Refusing to believe in spirit possession, Tsuyoshi travels to the Shinto shrine, where he meets the monk. After numerous attempts to disprove the monk, Tsuyoshi is flabbergasted when the monk provides logical solutions to his so-called symptoms. The monk gets angry and upset when Tsuyoshi goes off the rails in his act and accidentally destroys the Shinto shrine. On the way to kendo practice, Mihoshi is surprised that Yoshino is very talented at kendo despite never showing up at the dōjō. When Yoshino stops to pet Sakamoto, Mihoshi attempts to strike Yoshino from behind with her shinai, but she unintentionally strikes the assistant instructor, who was riding a bike. Meanwhile, Fe encourages Weboshī to look on the bright side when the latter drops her meat bun on the ground, though Fe finds it difficult to do so when she drops her popsicle on the ground as well. Outside the Shinonome Lab, Hakase and Sakamoto are surrounded by two dogs named Pyon and Oguri Cap after their owner Mai purposely leaves them unattended. When Yūko and Mio show up and claim that the dogs are harmless, the dogs end up biting Yūko and Mio, who quiver in pain. Mai apologetically gives Hakase a box of chocolate sharks before leaving. Two other dogs named Buddy and Co-Buddy rush to comfort Yūko and Mio, forcing Hakase and Sakamoto to retreat back home. The owner of these dogs and the grandson of the gentleman is revealed to be a boy named Kiyoshi.
23	24	"Nichijou Episode 23"; Transliteration: "Nichijou no Dai-ni-jū-san-wa" (Japanese: 日常の第二十三話)	Kazuya Sakamoto	Katsuhiko Muramoto	September 5, 2011
Yoshino pranks Mio into sampling digusting homemade jam and sipping piping hot tea. As life flashes before her eyes, Mio unfortunately learns that the homemade jam was flavored with dried fish. Izumi enters Makoto's messy bedroom and finds a dirty magazine under his bed. This leads to an awkward argument, where Makoto complains about Izumi's invasion of privacy while Izumi tries to confront Makoto's possession of the dirty magazine. During a downpour, Makoto begs for Manabu to be the go-soccer club adviser, but Manabu claims that their previous go-soccer club match ended in a draw. As Makoto passes by the clubroom, he misreads the social cues when Yuria writes calligraphy on a banner while Kenzaburō hovers over her shoulder. Makoto chases Manabu to the school rooftop, where Manabu finally agrees to be the club adviser after Makoto shows a high school graduation photo of Izumi. Meanwhile, Fe tags along with Weboshī, who decides to confess her feelings to Tsuyoshi. Weboshī and Fe are left dumbfounded when they learn that Tsuyoshi is now bald-headed. As it still rains, Mai visits the Shinonome Lab, where Hakase holds a grudge against Mai for leaving Pyon and Oguri Cap unattended. After Hakase draws a blue shark, Mai impresses Hakase with a detailed sketch of her own. Nano later brings some tea and snacks, only to find that Mai already left. A rainbow appears in the sunny sky as Mai is shown to have Hakase's drawing as a keepsake.
24	25	"Nichijou Episode 24"; Transliteration: "Nichijou no Dai-ni-jū-yon-wa" (Japanese: 日常の第二十四話)	Noriyuki Kitanohara	Jukki Hanada	September 12, 2011
In the classroom, Yūko tells Mio that she saw Nano and Kōjirō walking together in the school hallway, though Mio believes that Yūko is making a big deal out of nothing. However, Yūko falsely claims that Kōjirō bought yakisoba-pan for Nano in the school cafeteria and made his move on Nano in the school courtyard. Mio begins to wildly imagine what could have happened. She then rushes to the school hallway, though stunned that Kōjirō only picked up a dropped book for Nano. Walking home after kendo practice at sunset, Misato is surprised when Mihoshi mentions that Kōjirō visits the dōjō every three days, even though Kōjirō is in the drama club at school. Mihoshi teasingly suggests for Misato to confess her feelings to Kōjirō. At the Shinonome Lab, Sakamoto catches a cold, prompting Nano to look after him. Hakase attempts to feign illness in order to avoid green onions and receive chocolate, but Nano does not fall for it. Instead, Hakase throws a tantrum and accuses Nano of playing favorites with Sakamoto. Mio drops her 100 yen coin on the ground while trying to insert it in the beverage vending machine. The coin rolls and coincidentally bumps into Kōjirō, who claims the coin for himself in order to buy a beverage, though the paper cup ends up being dispensed upside-down. At night in their bedrooms, Misato and Mio each contemplate their feelings for Kōjirō, but they are both interrupted by their respective sisters Mihoshi and Yoshino.
25	26	"Nichijou Episode 25"; Transliteration: "Nichijou no Dai-ni-jū-go-wa" (Japanese: 日常の第二十五話)	Yasuhiro Takemoto	Jukki Hanada	September 19, 2011
After injuring her left hand from accidentally smashing Kōjirō's glasses, Misato takes it upon herself to escort Kōjirō to class, only to embarrassingly realize that Kōjirō's glasses are just for style. Having witnessed Misato and Kōjirō walking together in the school hallway, Mio runs away in utter shock, while Yūko chases after her around town. Mio finally stops after rescuing a boy named Ma from drowning in a river. She receives an expression of gratitude from Ma, a kite from Ma's friend Osamu, a pardon from the policeman and a boxing gym invitation from an instructor named Shinshi. While getting lost from tailing Nano, Mai and Izumi, who were looking for Mio around town, Kana chances upon the Shinonome Lab, where Nano finds her outside. Once inside, Nano serves some tea to Kana. After Kana bluntly says that she wants to know everything about Nano, the latter misinterprets this as the former trying to establish a romantic relationship. In the chaos of spotting Hakase deduced as Nano's creator and Sakamoto misconstrued as a homunculus with a henohenomoheji drawn on a white sack over his head, Kana excuses herself to the bathroom as an attempt to escape the madness, only to get caught in a puddle of superglue. Worried that Mio has not gotten over her heartbreak, Yūko, Mai and Nano poorly disguise themselves as daifuku mascots running a raffle. Mio is touched when they give her a voucher for a lifelong friendship with them as a prize.
26	27	"Nichijou Episode 26"; Transliteration: "Nichijou no Dai-ni-jū-roku-wa" (Japanese: 日常の第二十六話)	Taichi Ishidate	Keiichi Arawi	September 26, 2011
Yūko, Mio and Mai eventually decide to throw a surprise birthday party for Nano and Hakase. In the Shinonome Lab, Hakase momentarily removes Nano's wind-up key and plans to give her a small device for her back, but Sakamoto accidentally crushes it. Unintentionally helping Mio and Mai dodge an errant baseball, a falling chalkboard eraser, two ants walking and a piece of chewed gum on the ground, Yūko accidentally bumps into Kōjirō and Misato near the beverage vending machine and sweeps past Izumi holding a flowerpot full of yellow pansies. After tripping on Ogi's comb and falling on the floor in the school hallway, Yūko asks Nano if she and her friends can swing by for a visit. At the park, Yūko and Mio each have trouble squashing a kabocha after numerous attempts and various methods. As Nano returns home, Hakase removes Nano's wind-up key while revealing that anyone other than Nano could remove the wind-up key. When Yūko, Mai and Mio arrive to celebrate, Nano eventually decides to keep her wind-up key after realizing that she already has an ordinary life. Hakase installs a small device in Nano's back as an add-on for the wind-up key, which would spin when Nano is genuinely happy. Despite two birthday cakes being ruined by Hakase, everyone enjoys the surprise birthday party, and Nano's wind-up key begins to spin.
