= Kuld =

Kuld may refer to:

- "Kuld", 1997 album by the Estonian rock band Terminaator
- Kuld (surname)
