= Võhma =

Town in Estonia

- Town
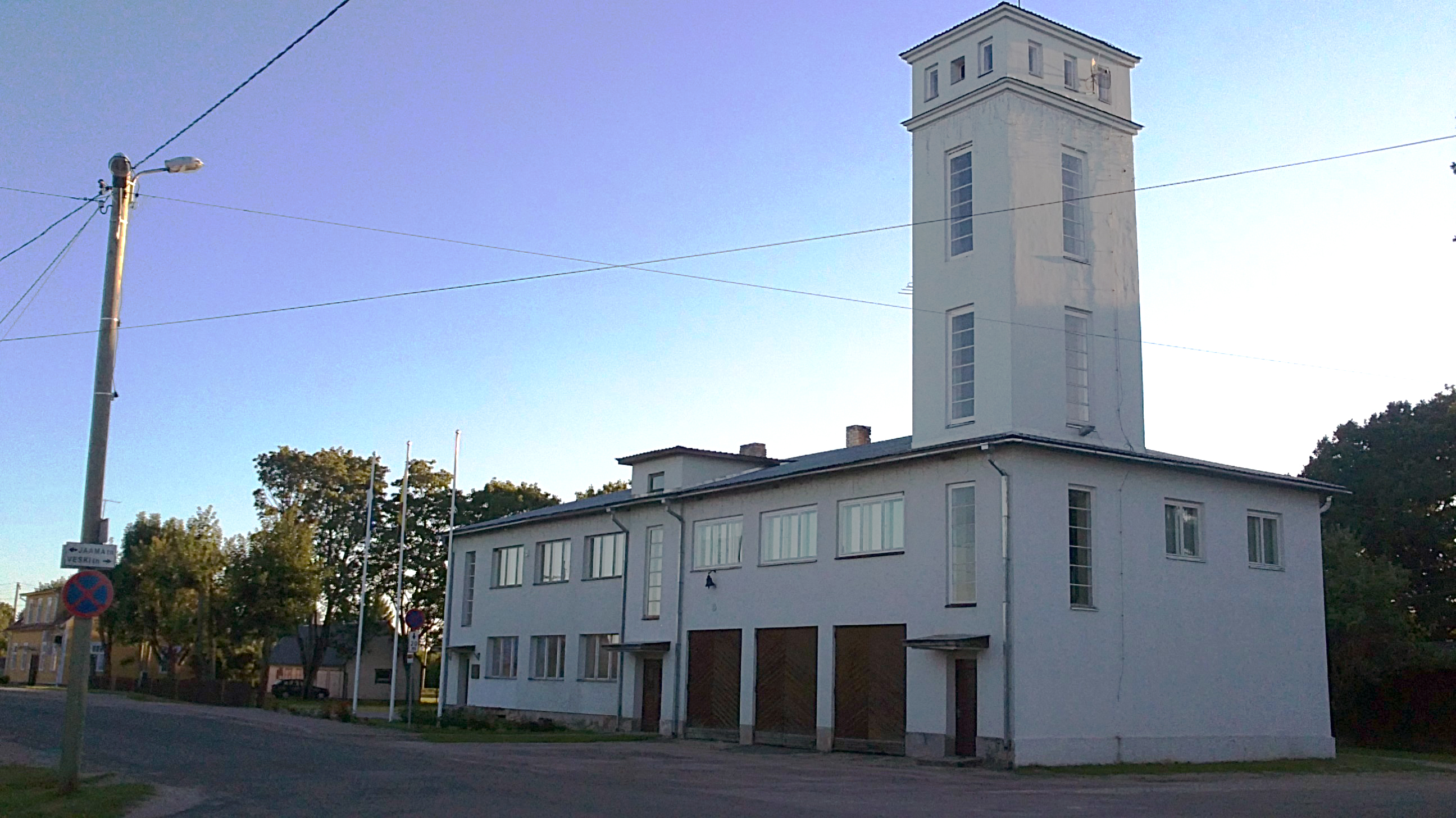
- Võhma town hall, former fire station

- Location in Estonia
- Coordinates: 58°37′59″N 25°33′00″E
- Country: Estonia
- County: Viljandi County
- Municipality: Põhja-Sakala Parish

Population (2026)
  - Total: 1,219
  - Rank: 39th
- Time zone: UTC+2 (EET)
  - Summer (DST): UTC+3 (EEST)

Võhma is a town in Põhja-Sakala Parish, Viljandi County, central Estonia.

== History ==
The settlement dates to the sixteenth century. The German-language name of the town was Wöchma. It began to grow when a railway station, located on the Tallinn - Viljandi railway line operated by Elron (rail transit), opened in 1899. Võhma was named a borough in 1945 and a town in 1993. In the period from 1928 to 1996 it was largely known for its slaughterhouse. The closure of the slaughterhouse caused a spike in unemployment, but the town has somewhat rebounded since then.

During the Cold War it was home to Võhma air base. It was located 4km north of Võhma, in Ollepa.

== Notable residents ==
- Riho Lahi (1904–1995), writer, journalist and cartoonist.
- Heiki Raudla (born 1949), educator, cartoonist and politician; Mayor of Viljandi, 1991 to 1992
- Jarmo Ahjupera (born 1984), footballer, played about 200 games and 22 for Estonia

== Gallery ==
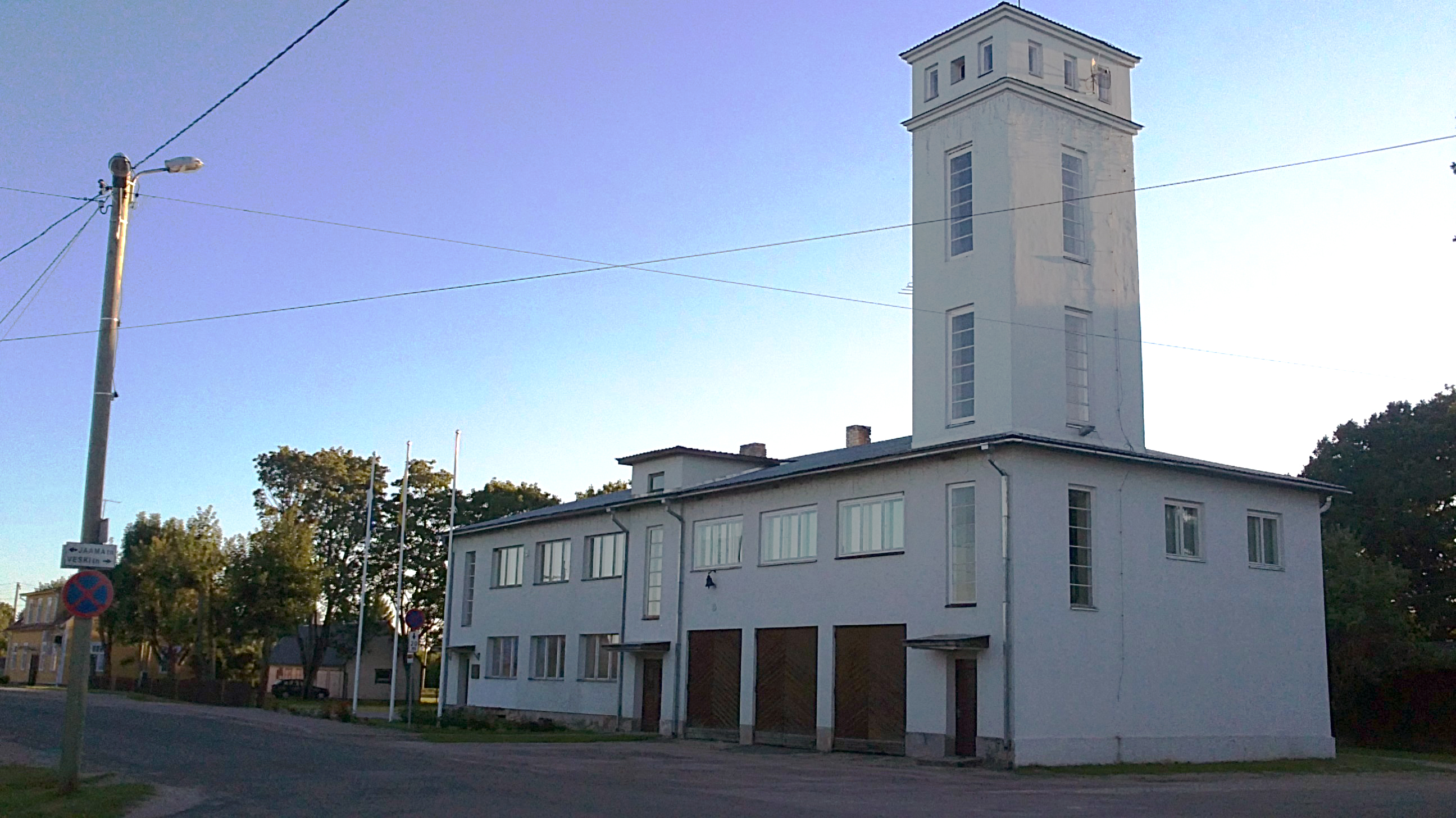
Võhma town hall

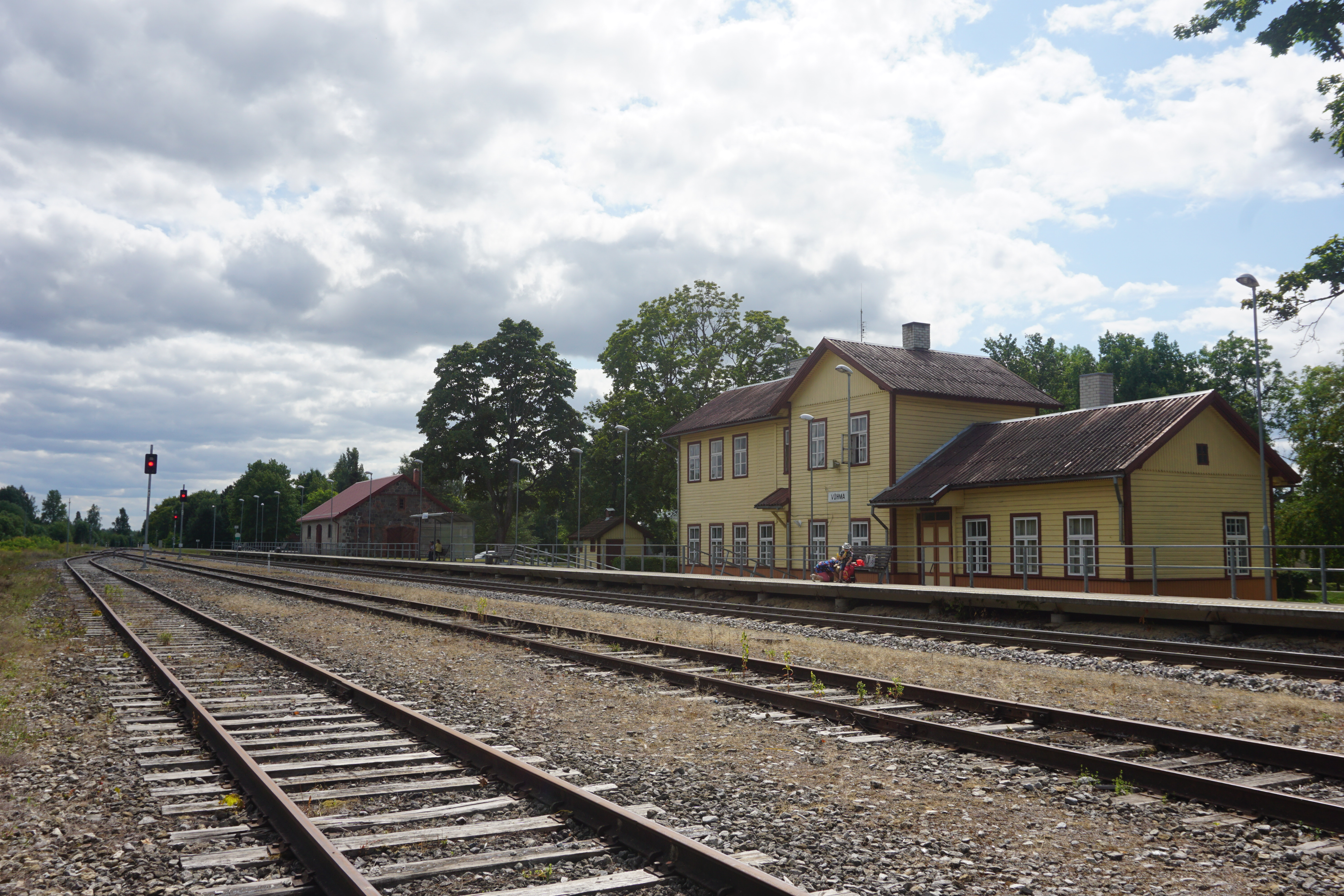
Võhma railway station

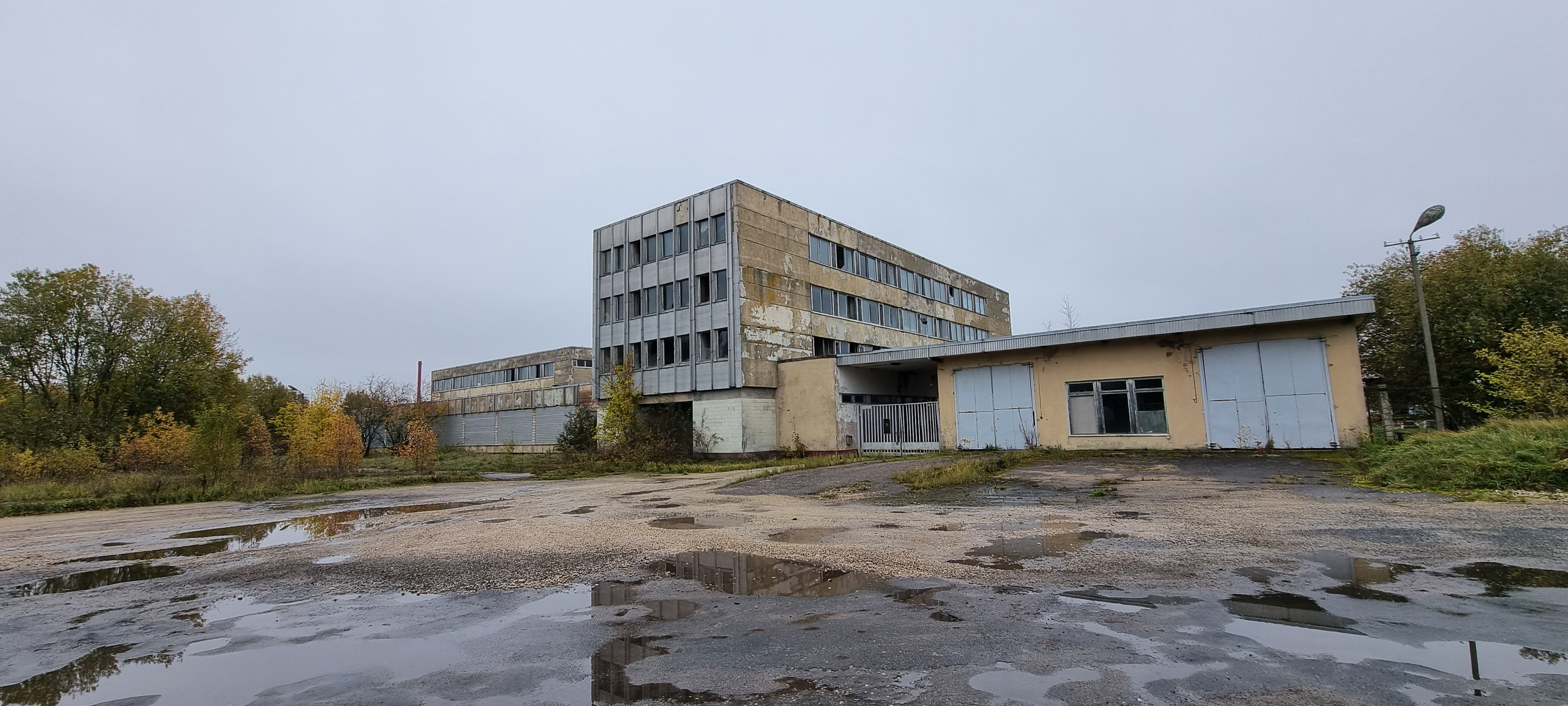
Former Võhma meat processing plant
