= Kuld (surname) =

Family name

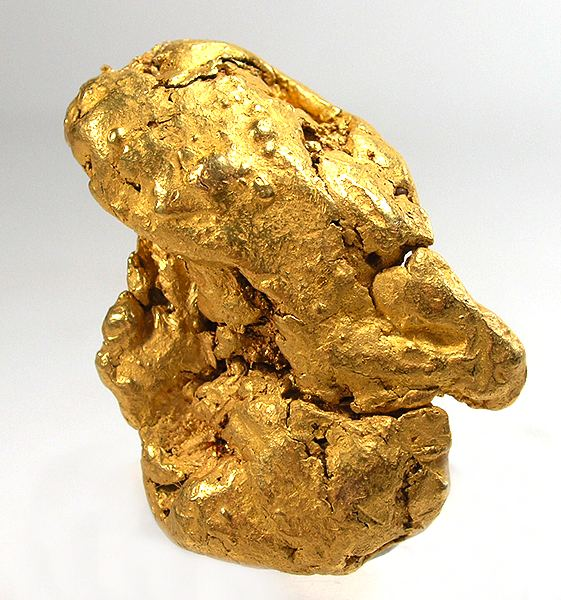

Origin
- Language: Estonian
- Meaning: gold
- Region of origin: Estonia

Kuld is an Estonian surname meaning "gold".

As of 1 January 2023, 106 men and 121 women have the surname Kuld in Estonia. Kuld ranks 763rd for men and 713th for women in the distribution of surnames in Estonia. The surname Kuld is the most commonly found in Valga County, where 7.88 per 10,000 inhabitants of the county bear the surname.

Individuals bearing the surname Kuld include:

- Ergo Kuld (born 1976), film director, cinematographer, and producer
- Grete Kuld (born 1989), singer, actress, and television presenter
- Riho Kuld (born 1936), Estonian sculptor and rower
