= Võhma air base =

Former Soviet air base in Estonia

Võhma
- IATA: none; ICAO: none

Summary
- Airport type: Military
- Operator: Soviet Air Force
- Location: Võhma
- Elevation AMSL: 200 ft (61 m)
- Coordinates: 58°39′44″N 025°35′12″E
- Interactive map of Võhma

Runways
Direction	Length		Surface
Direction	ft	m	Surface
	6,562	2,000

Võhma Air Base (also Vohma) is a former Soviet air base in Estonia located 4 km north of Võhma.

Flight operations were wound down towards the end of the Cold War, and the military installation was entirely dismantled and liquidated following the restoration of Estonian independence.
