= City (manga) =

Japanese manga series by Keiichi Arawi

- First tankōbon volume cover, featuring (from left to right) Midori Nagumo, Mimineko, and Ayumu Niikura
- Genre: Slice of life; Surreal comedy
- Manga
- Written by: Keiichi Arawi
- Published by: Kodansha
- English publisher: NA: Vertical
- Imprint: Morning KC
- Magazine: Morning
- Original run: September 29, 2016 – October 16, 2025
- Volumes: 15
- Anime television series

City the Animation
- Directed by: Taichi Ishidate
- Music by: Piranhans
- Studio: Kyoto Animation
- Licensed by: Amazon Prime Video (streaming): NA: GKIDS; UK: Anime Limited
- Original network: Tokyo MX, ABC TV, TV Aichi, AT-X, BS11
- Original run: July 7, 2025 – September 29, 2025
- Episodes: 13
- icon

City (stylized in all caps) is a Japanese manga series written and illustrated by Keiichi Arawi. It was serialized from September 2016 to October 2025 in Kodansha's seinen manga magazine Morning. It has been published in 15 tankōbon volumes. In North America, the series is licensed by Vertical.

An anime television series adaptation titled City the Animation, produced by Kyoto Animation, aired from July to September 2025 on Tokyo MX. It is the studio's first non-sequel anime in six years, and the studio's second anime adapted from a manga series by Arawi after the 2011 adaptation of Nichijou, with both series set in the same universe.

== Plot ==
The story follows the Mont Blanc Trio, consisting of university sophomores Midori Nagumo and Wako Izumi and freshman Ayumu Niikura, as they navigate their lives alongside a populace filled with not-quite-ordinary people in the city aptly called City.

== Characters ==
=== Mont Blanc Trio ===
Midori Nagumo (南雲 美鳥, Nagumo Midori)
Voiced by: Mikako Komatsu (Japanese); Erica Lindbeck (English)
A 20-year-old university sophomore at Mont Blanc University. She works as a waitress at the Makabe's Western Bistro, and she is a resident of the Mokumesei Manor. Although she often acts as the story's main trickster, she is a gifted athlete and a kind girl in general.
Ayumu Niikura (新倉 (にーくら), Niikura)
Voiced by: Aki Toyosaki (Japanese); Cat Protano (English)
An 18-year-old freshman at the same university as Nagumo and Wako, who dreams of becoming a photographer. She is also a resident of the Mokumesei Manor. She had been friends with Nagumo since their school days, when she had inspired her to take up photography and even kept a photo of Nagumo from that time in a locket.
Wako Izumi (泉 わこ, Izumi Wako)
Voiced by: Yui Ishikawa (Japanese); Brenna Larsen (English)
Similar to Nagumo, she is a university sophomore at the same university as Nagumo and Niikura and is also a resident of the Mokumesei Manor. She has a very spontaneous personality and often finds herself in strange situations due to her unusual behavior and outlook on the world around her.

=== Makabe family ===
Tsurubishi Makabe (真壁 鶴菱, Makabe Tsurubishi)
Voiced by: Yoshihisa Kawahara (Japanese); Brent Mukai (English)
The owner and head chef of their family restaurant that specializes in Western-style cuisine. He is married to his wife, who is an archaeologist, and father to their children, Tatewaku and Matsuri. Although he is a responsible caregiver to the children and the family business, he also has a quirky side.
Tatewaku Makabe (真壁 立涌, Makabe Tatewaku)
Voiced by: Miyu Irino (Japanese); Kevin Andrew Rivera (English)
A second-year high school student and a substitute player on his school's soccer team. He is the older brother to Matsuri. He has a crush on Riko.
Matsuri Makabe (真壁 まつり, Makabe Matsuri)
Voiced by: Ayaka Nanase (Japanese); Sarah Miller-Crews (English)
A middle school student who spends her free time with Ecchan, her best friend. She is the younger sister to Tatewaku.
Obaba (御婆)
Voiced by: Kazutomi Yamamoto (Japanese); Kaitlyn Robrock (English)
Tsurubishi's mother-in-law and Tatewaku and Matsuri's grandmother. She is the owner of Mokumesei Manor, an apartment complex where the Mont Blanc Trio resides.
Professor Makabe (真壁教授, Makabe Kyōju)
Tsurubishi's wife and Tatewaku and Matsuri's mother. She is an archaeological professor at Mont Blanc University who travels the world and often sends her family the artifacts she finds.

=== Adatara family ===
Dr. Adatara (安達太良博士, Adatara-hakase)
Voiced by: Takehito Koyasu (Japanese); Brook Chalmers (English)
The patriarch of the family and a retired scientist.
Mr. Adatara (安達太良父, Adatara-chichi)
Voiced by: Takehito Koyasu (Japanese); Brian Hull (English)
The owner of their liquor store. He and Mrs. Adatara have five children.
Mrs. Adatara (安達太良母, Adatara-haha)
Voiced by: Mayumi Asano (Japanese); Shelby Young (English)
Wife of Mr. Adatara and mother to their five children.
Tatsuta Adatara (安達太良 達太, Adatara Tatsuta)
Voiced by: KENN (Japanese); Ryan Colt Levy (English)
The eldest son of the family. A former soccer player and the current heir to the family-owned liquor store.
Kamome Adatara (安達太良 かもめ, Adatara Kamome)
Voiced by: Coco Hayashi (Japanese); Erica Lindbeck (English)
The eldest daughter of the family. She served as a manager to Shia Azumaya.
Ryōta Adatara (安達太良 良太, Adatara Ryōta)
Voiced by: Satoshi Inomata (Japanese); Brian Hull (English)
The second son and middle child of the family and classmate of Tatewaku and Riko. He is called the "modern-day William Tell" by his peers.
Umi Adatara (安達太良 うみ, Adatara Umi)
Voiced by: Haruna Fukushima (Japanese); Kaitlyn Robrock (English)
The eldest of the twins.
Sora Adatara (安達太良 そら, Adatara Sora)
Voiced by: Yuuki Temma (Japanese); Kaitlyn Robrock (English)
The youngest of the twins.

=== Other characters ===
Riko Izumi (泉 りこ, Izumi Riko)
Voiced by: Yū Wakui (Japanese); Shelby Young (English)
The younger sister of Wako who is a student at City South High School and is constantly drowsy, prompting her friends to try and wake her up during important events. She has the ability to make many people fall in love with her, just by simply smiling at them.
Eri Amakazari (雨飾 えり, Amakazari Eri) / Ecchan (えっちゃん, Etchan)
Voiced by: Azusa Tadokoro (Japanese); Cristina Vee (English)
A student from City South Junior High School who is best friends with Matsuri. She has a hard time trying to tell her that she and her family will move to England over the summer. After Matsuri finds out, the two decide to spend their remaining time together.
Kamaboko Oni (鬼 カマボコ, Oni Kamaboko)
Voiced by: Yu Miyazaki (Japanese); Max Mittelman (English)
An author and neighbor of the Mont Blanc Trio at the Mokumesei Manor, who writes and illustrates the manga Mr. Bummer (落胆くん, Rakutan-kun) for Weekly City.
Todoroki (轟)
Voiced by: Ryōta Suzuki (Japanese); Andrew Russell (English)
An editor working for Weekly City who idolizes Kamaboko and serializes his manga as editor-in-charge.
Daisuke Naganohara (長野原 大介, Naganohara Daisuke)
Voiced by: Mai Aizawa
An author who was going to replace Kamaboko Oni until she injured her hand after an accident. She is referred as a very famous and talented manga artist. In actuality, she is Mio Naganohara, a character from Keiichi Arawi's previous work, Nichijou.
Nice Man (いい人, Ii Hito)
Voiced by: Kiyomitsu Mizuuchi
A stoic and self-described good person.
Sumire Sakurakomi Tanabe (タナベ 菫 桜子美, Tanabe Sumire Sakurakomi)
Voiced by: Yūko Gotō (Japanese); Kaitlyn Robrock (English)
A retired police officer and well-mannered woman who often rewards the citizens of City for their good actions.
Hotaka (穂高)
Voiced by: Jin Domon (Japanese); Brian Hull (English)
The butler of Tanabe. He often acts on Tanabe's behalf in expressing gratitude to the citizens of City through capturing them using his chain.
Rindō Obina (帯那 林道, Obina Rindō)
Voiced by: Makoto Kaneko (Japanese); Max Mittelman (English)
The captain of the City South High School soccer team, which Tatewaku serves as a substitute player.
Yamato Kurogane (黒金 大和, Kurogane Yamato)
Voiced by: Atsushi Kousaka (Japanese); Brian Hull (English)
A member of the City South High School soccer team.
Tekaridake Nobuteru (光岳 伸晃, Nobuteru Tekaridake)
Voiced by: Jun Fukuyama (Japanese); A.J. LoCascio (English)
The leader of Mont Blanc University's Tekaridake Troupe, whose members are animals.

== Media ==
=== Manga ===
The series is written and illustrated by Keiichi Arawi and began serialization in Kodansha's Morning magazine on September 29, 2016. The series concluded on February 4, 2021. Kodansha published the series in 13 volumes. An online autograph contest was held to celebrate the final volume's release. The series returned in Morning on December 12, 2024, three years after its original conclusion, before concluding again on October 16, 2025. The second run was collected in two additional volumes.

At Anime Expo 2017, Vertical announced they licensed the series for English publication.

==== Volumes ====
No.	Original release date	Original ISBN	English release date	English ISBN
1	March 23, 2017	978-4-06-388708-2	March 27, 2018	978-1-94-505478-5
2	April 21, 2017	978-4-06-388719-8	June 12, 2018	978-1-94-505479-2
3	September 22, 2017	978-4-06-510229-9	September 18, 2018	978-1-94-719418-2
4	March 23, 2018	978-4-06-511157-4	December 11, 2018	978-1-94-719426-7
5	July 23, 2018	978-4-06-512026-2	April 30, 2019	978-1-94-719473-1
6	November 22, 2018	978-4-06-513610-2	October 22, 2019	978-1-94-719498-4
7	March 22, 2019	978-4-06-514954-6	January 21, 2020	978-1-94-719499-1
8	July 23, 2019	978-4-06-516295-8	May 12, 2020	978-1-94-998019-6
9	November 21, 2019	978-4-06-517782-2	October 13, 2020	978-1-94-998045-5
10	March 23, 2020	978-4-06-518933-7	January 5, 2021	978-1-94-998067-7
11	August 20, 2020	978-4-06-520306-4	May 25, 2021	978-1-64-729006-1
12	November 20, 2020	978-4-06-520307-1	July 27, 2021	978-1-64-729049-8
13	April 23, 2021	978-4-06-522116-7	January 25, 2022	978-1-64-729062-7
14	July 23, 2025	978-4-06-540019-7	November 3, 2026	978-1-64-729631-5
15	December 23, 2025	978-4-06-541354-8	—	—

=== Anime ===
An anime television series adaptation, titled City the Animation, was announced on September 21, 2024. It was produced by Kyoto Animation as the studio's first non-sequel anime since the arson attack in 2019 and directed by Taichi Ishidate, with character designs and chief animation direction handled by Tamami Tokuyama, color designs by Kana Miyata, art direction by Shiori Yamazaki, 3D direction by Tatsunori Kase, sound direction by Yōta Tsuruoka, and music by the Piranhans. The series aired from July 7 to September 29, 2025, on Tokyo MX and other networks, running for a single cour of 13 episodes, with most containing multiple short segments per episode, with there being 80 segments in total. The opening theme is "Hello", performed by Riho Furui, while the ending theme is "Lucky", performed by Tomoo. (Note: Tokyo MX listed the series premiere on July 6, 2025, at 24:00, which is effectively July 7 at midnight JST.)

ABC Animation holds the global rights to the series with Amazon Prime Video streaming the series worldwide outside of Japan.

==== Episodes ====
No.	Title	Directed by	Written by	Animation directed by	Original release date
1	"Makabe Family"; Transliteration: "Makabe-ke" (Japanese: マカベ家)	Taichi Ishidate	Ayano Sato	Tamami Tokuyama	July 7, 2025
1	"Friends"; Transliteration: "Tomodachi" (Japanese: 友達)	Taichi Ishidate	Ayano Sato	Tamami Tokuyama	July 7, 2025
1	"Crispy Noodles"; Transliteration: "Kata Yakisoba" (Japanese: 固焼きそば)	Taichi Ishidate	Ayano Sato	Tamami Tokuyama	July 7, 2025
1	"Dr. Adatara"; Transliteration: "Adatara-hakase" (Japanese: 安達太良博士)	Taichi Ishidate	Ayano Sato	Tamami Tokuyama	July 7, 2025
1	"Wako Izumi"; Transliteration: "Izumi Wako" (Japanese: 泉わこ)	Taichi Ishidate	Ayano Sato	Tamami Tokuyama	July 7, 2025
1	"Room 203"; Transliteration: "203-Gōshitsu" (Japanese: 203号室)	Taichi Ishidate	Ayano Sato	Tamami Tokuyama	July 7, 2025
1	"Dream"; Transliteration: "Yume" (Japanese: 夢)	Taichi Ishidate	Ayano Sato	Tamami Tokuyama	July 7, 2025
At the Makabe family's Western Bistro, Tsurubishi and Matsuri demand Tatewaku to wear a miniskirt based on his horoscope reading. Tatewaku complies to his embarrassment, only to be laughed at by his family. Matsuri later attends school and bonds with her best friend Eri "Ecchan" Amakazari, deepening their friendship. Midori Nagumo begins her work at the bistro with Tsurubishi as they serve the Nice Man, unaware that Dr. Adatara is spying on them. Nagumo and Tsurubishi's antics cause them to destroy Dr. Adatara's surveillance equipment and ruin the Nice Man's order of yakisoba, though the Nice Man remains oblivious to the chaos. Elsewhere, Wako Izumi loses her point card to the bistro and calms herself with various trinkets, only for a police officer to return the card to her. Nagumo arrives home to Mokumesei Manor, where her neighbors Kamaboko Oni and Todoroki reluctantly decide to end the publication of his manga Mr. Bummer for Weekly City. Nagumo reunites with her roommate Ayumu Niikura and they discuss their day. Niikura asks Nagumo about her dreams, and Nagumo replies she wants to do something fun.
2	"City South Eleven"; Transliteration: "City Minami Irebun" (Japanese: CITY南イレブン)	Noriyuki Kitanohara	Ayano Sato	Kazumi Ikeda	July 14, 2025
2	"Trio"; Transliteration: "San-ningumi" (Japanese: 3人組)	Noriyuki Kitanohara	Ayano Sato	Kazumi Ikeda	July 14, 2025
2	"Editorial Trio"; Transliteration: "San-nin no Henshū" (Japanese: 3人の編集)	Noriyuki Kitanohara	Ayano Sato	Kazumi Ikeda	July 14, 2025
2	"Instruction"; Transliteration: "Shinan" (Japanese: 指南)	Noriyuki Kitanohara	Ayano Sato	Kazumi Ikeda	July 14, 2025
2	"Beautiful Bird"; Transliteration: "Byūtifuru Bādo" (Japanese: ビューティフルバード)	Noriyuki Kitanohara	Ayano Sato	Kazumi Ikeda	July 14, 2025
2	"Playing God"; Transliteration: "Kamisama Gokko" (Japanese: 神様ごっこ)	Noriyuki Kitanohara	Ayano Sato	Kazumi Ikeda	July 14, 2025
2	"The Path of Manga"; Transliteration: "Manga Michi" (Japanese: 漫画道)	Noriyuki Kitanohara	Ayano Sato	Kazumi Ikeda	July 14, 2025
2	"Conflict! Niikura vs Niikura"; Transliteration: "Kattō! Niikura vs Niikura" (Japanese: 葛藤!にーくらvsにーくら)	Noriyuki Kitanohara	Ayano Sato	Kazumi Ikeda	July 14, 2025
Tatewaku and the City South High School soccer team discuss game plans to protect their star player Sasago from injury, only for it to manifest to their horror. Elsewhere, Nagumo and Niikura meet Wako for the first time and establish friendly relations. Nagumo and Niikura later follow a guide from Weekly City to charm people and earn raises, though they are left embarrassed when it does not work. Niikura recalls how she was charmed by Nagumo's charisma when they were in high school. The next day, Matsuri and Ecchan discuss the thought of making people's prayers come true, as Ecchan forgets to tell Matsuri she would be moving away. At Weekly City's headquarters, Todoroki learns from his lead editor-in-chief that the magazine will receive acclaimed manga artist Daisuke Naganohara as a replacement for Kamaboko, so he exchanges farewells with Kamaboko after publishing the final issue of Mr. Bummer. However, Todoroki is forced to bring back Kamaboko and revive his manga when he learns that Naganohara became suddenly unavailable. Later, Niikura fights her temptations to take a 500-yen coin from the ground, and she expresses anger towards her good conscience, who arrived late.
3	"Tekaridake Troupe! Volume"; Transliteration: "Gekidan Tekaridake! No Maki" (Japanese: 劇団テカリダケ!の巻)	Takuya Yamamura	Masashi Nishikawa	Kayo Hikiyama	July 21, 2025
3	"Riko Izumi's Close Call!"; Transliteration: "Izumi Riko Kikiippatsu!" (Japanese: 泉りこ危機一髪!)	Takuya Yamamura	Masashi Nishikawa	Kayo Hikiyama	July 21, 2025
3	"Bakery"; Transliteration: "Panya" (Japanese: パン屋)	Takuya Yamamura	Masashi Nishikawa	Kayo Hikiyama	July 21, 2025
3	"Kindness Revolution"; Transliteration: "Yasashisa Kakumei" (Japanese: やさしさ革命)	Takuya Yamamura	Masashi Nishikawa	Kayo Hikiyama	July 21, 2025
3	"The Harisen and the Hideout"; Transliteration: "Harisen to Ajito" (Japanese: ハリセンとアジト)	Takuya Yamamura	Masashi Nishikawa	Kayo Hikiyama	July 21, 2025
3	"We're a Team! Refreshing Class 3!"; Transliteration: "Bokura wa Nakamada! Sawayaka Sankumi!" (Japanese: 僕らは仲間だ!さわやか3組!)	Takuya Yamamura	Masashi Nishikawa	Kayo Hikiyama	July 21, 2025
Tekaridake Nobuteru, a student at Mont Blanc University who leads the eccentric Tekaridake Troupe, tells its members, who are animals, to rehearse his new script, but they do not comply unless he bribes them with food. At City South High School, Wako's sleep-deprived sister, Riko, gets in various close calls that causes her to reminisce her childhood with Wako. Later, Nagumo and Niikura purchase bread at a bakery, only to find out that one piece of bread is being sold periodically and at fluctuating prices. They head back to Mokumesei Manor, and Niikura tests a harisen that does not harm Nagumo and Wako. The trio then finds out the paper used is a treasure map, so they follow its trail but realize the loot is meaningless. Meanwhile, Matsuri and Ecchan discuss the idea of universal kindness and engage in kind gestures. Back at City South High School, Riko is saved countless times by her classmates Tatewaku and Ryōta Adatara during a quiz, much to the amazement of their class; their teacher, noticing this, decides to end the session while promising to make their next quiz harder.
4	"The Star of Tanabe"; Transliteration: "Tanabe-san no Hoshi" (Japanese: タナベさんのホシ)	Ryo Miyaki	Ayano Sato	Nobuaki Maruki	July 28, 2025
4	"A Very Strange Visitor"; Transliteration: "Yonimokimyōna Hōmonsha" (Japanese: 世にも奇妙な訪問者)	Ryo Miyaki	Ayano Sato	Nobuaki Maruki	July 28, 2025
4	"Ms. Tanabe and Hotaka"; Transliteration: "Tanabe-san to Hotaka" (Japanese: タナベさんと穂高)	Ryo Miyaki	Ayano Sato	Nobuaki Maruki	July 28, 2025
4	"Tsurubishi Makabe's Twilight"; Transliteration: "Makabe Tsurubishi no Tasogare" (Japanese: 真壁鶴菱の黄昏)	Ryo Miyaki	Ayano Sato	Nobuaki Maruki	July 28, 2025
4	"To Be Continued"; Transliteration: "Tsudzuku" (Japanese: つづく)	Ryo Miyaki	Ayano Sato	Nobuaki Maruki	July 28, 2025
4	"Ecchan and the Real Deal and the Bread Festival"; Transliteration: "Ecchan to Honba to Pan Matsuri" (Japanese: えっちゃんと本場とパンまつり)	Ryo Miyaki	Ayano Sato	Nobuaki Maruki	July 28, 2025
4	"Human Intersection"; Transliteration: "Ningen Kōsakuten" (Japanese: 人間交錯点)	Ryo Miyaki	Ayano Sato	Nobuaki Maruki	July 28, 2025
While out on a delivery run, Nagumo is informed of the Nice Man's good behavior. Nagumo returns to the Western Bistro and sees the Nice Man rewarding her and Tsurubishi for good actions, despite having done nothing. Tatewaku returns home when he is greeted by a voice claiming to be him from the future. After answering its questions, he finds out it is Tsurubishi confronting him about his poor grades. Sometime later, Tsurubishi recounts to Tatewaku on his visits to a restaurant that closed down before he could order anything else. Elsewhere, Matsuri and Ecchan discuss the English pronunciation of certain words. Meanwhile, Sumire Sakurakomi Tanabe and her butler Hotaka discuss the good actions of City's citizens as they witness Nagumo performing one, prompting Hotaka to pursue her to thank her. Nagumo reunites with Niikura and Wako, where she finds a pendant that Niikura is adamant on hiding it. She decides to pursue the pendant as it is snatched by an animal named Mimineko, with Niikura chasing her. Before she can get the pendant, Nagumo is finally caught by Hotaka and taken inside a limousine, which leaves much to Niikura's bewilderment.
5	"Tower"; Transliteration: "Tō" (Japanese: 塔)	Minoru Ōta	Masashi Nishikawa	Miku Kadowaki	August 4, 2025
5	"Bad Time"; Transliteration: "Baddo Taimu" (Japanese: バッドタイム)	Minoru Ōta	Masashi Nishikawa	Miku Kadowaki	August 4, 2025
5	"Abacus and Braids"; Transliteration: "Soroban to Mittsuami" (Japanese: そろばんと三つ編み)	Minoru Ōta	Masashi Nishikawa	Miku Kadowaki	August 4, 2025
5	"Running Through Youth"; Transliteration: "Kakenukeru Seishun" (Japanese: かけ抜ける青春)	Minoru Ōta	Masashi Nishikawa	Miku Kadowaki	August 4, 2025
5	"Definitely Safe Niikura"; Transliteration: "Zettai Anzen Niikura" (Japanese: 絶対安全にーくら)	Minoru Ōta	Masashi Nishikawa	Miku Kadowaki	August 4, 2025
Nagumo is escorted by Hotaka to the Tanabe mansion and is held captive at the Hospitality Towers' waiting room until she is rewarded. There, she encounters the Nice Man and they plot their escape. Nagumo learns from the Nice Man of the towers rewarding hospitality to those who stay, as Wako later joins them. The group passes several trials while descending the tower. Meanwhile, Niikura continues chasing after Mimineko and the pendant and finds it being taken by Matsuri and Ecchan. Niikura tries taking the pendant by force, but she is unsuccessful and Mimineko escapes again. Niikura calls Nagumo on her whereabouts and runs to the towers, while various City citizens congregate at the Tanabe mansion. Nagumo's group passes the final trial and heads outside to find a massive party being held. Nagumo and Wako reunite with Niikura, who remarks she did not retrieve the pendant. Mimineko delivers the pendant to an antiques shop owner and he puts it up for sale, revealing Niikura's pendant contains a picture of Nagumo. The end-credits scenes depict an ancestor of Tanabe sharing his compassion with City's citizens and the formation of the Hospitality Towers.
6	"Good Morning Adatara"; Transliteration: "Guddo Mōningu Adatara" (Japanese: グッドモーニング安達太良)	Taichi Ogawa	Ayano Sato	Mariko Takahashi	August 11, 2025
6	"Niikura vs Soccer Team"; Transliteration: "Niikura VS Sakkā-bu" (Japanese: にーくらVSサッカー部)	Taichi Ogawa	Ayano Sato	Mariko Takahashi	August 11, 2025
6	"Death March"; Transliteration: "Rinjū Māchi" (Japanese: 臨終マーチ)	Taichi Ogawa	Ayano Sato	Mariko Takahashi	August 11, 2025
6	"Tatami Room and Freesia"; Transliteration: "Ozashiki to Furījia" (Japanese: お座敷とフリージア)	Taichi Ogawa	Ayano Sato	Mariko Takahashi	August 11, 2025
6	"Wako Izumi's Mission"; Transliteration: "Izumi Wako no Misshon" (Japanese: 泉わこのミッション)	Taichi Ogawa	Ayano Sato	Mariko Takahashi	August 11, 2025
6	"We Are Friends! The Silent Trio"; Transliteration: "Bokura wa Nakamada! Sairento Sankumi" (Japanese: 僕らは仲間だ!サイレント3組)	Taichi Ogawa	Ayano Sato	Mariko Takahashi	August 11, 2025
6	"A Voyage Between Passion and Calmness"; Transliteration: "Jōnetsu to Reisei no Ma no Kōkai" (Japanese: 情熱と冷静の間の航海)	Taichi Ogawa	Ayano Sato	Mariko Takahashi	August 11, 2025
6	"Farewell"; Transliteration: "O Wakare" (Japanese: お別れ)	Taichi Ogawa	Ayano Sato	Mariko Takahashi	August 11, 2025
The Adatara family experiences a hectic breakfast as they leave for their errands. Meanwhile, Niikura is confronted by the City South High soccer team's lackadaisical demeanor, causing Niikura to lose her temper. Later, Dr. Adatara fakes his death and eavesdrops on Tsurubishi admitting his care for him. Dr. Adatara then wakes up to reveal his prank, frightening Tsurubishi. At Mokumesei Manor, Todoroki and Kamaboko discuss releasing Mr. Bummer as a dual-manga series after seeing another manga following Kamaboko's style, which eases Kamaboko's fears of Mr. Bummer being cancelled again. Wako submits her photos for a competition, while Riko's classmates try to help accomplish her quiz quietly. They finish it in time, but they are forced to answer a makeup exam. Todoroki later encounters Wako and invites her to publish for Weekly City after seeing her skills, though Wako declines much to Todoroki's dismay. As the day comes to a close, Ecchan tearfully says her farewells to Matsuri, and they sit by the river.
7	"Countdown"; Transliteration: "Kauntodaun" (Japanese: カウントダウン)	Noriyuki Kitanohara	Masashi Nishikawa	Kazumi Ikeda	August 18, 2025
7	"Champion of Justice"; Transliteration: "Seigi no Mikata" (Japanese: 正義の味方)	Noriyuki Kitanohara	Masashi Nishikawa	Kazumi Ikeda	August 18, 2025
7	"Stand Up! Tsurubishi!!"; Transliteration: "Tate! Tsurubishi!! No Maki" (Japanese: 立て!鶴菱!!の巻)	Noriyuki Kitanohara	Masashi Nishikawa	Kazumi Ikeda	August 18, 2025
7	"An Evening of Boredom"; Transliteration: "Taikutsuna Yoru wa" (Japanese: 退屈な夜は)	Noriyuki Kitanohara	Masashi Nishikawa	Kazumi Ikeda	August 18, 2025
7	"Late-Night Snacker"; Transliteration: "Yoru no Shokuji-sha" (Japanese: 夜の食事者)	Noriyuki Kitanohara	Masashi Nishikawa	Kazumi Ikeda	August 18, 2025
7	"Kuratake the Barber"; Transliteration: "Riyō no Kuratake" (Japanese: 理容のクラタケ)	Noriyuki Kitanohara	Masashi Nishikawa	Kazumi Ikeda	August 18, 2025
7	"Hell"; Transliteration: "Jigoku" (Japanese: 地獄)	Noriyuki Kitanohara	Masashi Nishikawa	Kazumi Ikeda	August 18, 2025
Matsuri and Ecchan decide to spend as much time together as possible before Ecchan leaves for England. Meanwhile, Tsurubishi takes a customer to the countryside to satisfy his order of fried rice, where he acquires its ingredients in an exotic fashion. However, the customer finds Tsurubishi's fried rice to be average, leaving him incredulous and depressed. Nagumo later finds the depressed Tsurubishi, and she and Matsuri cheer him up to continue work. Despite this, Tsurubishi is saddened no customers came to the Western Bistro. At Mokumesei Manor, Nagumo and Wako ask Niikura on her assumed angry disposition, which only infuriates Niikura further before they head to sleep. Niikura wakes up late at night to eat raw instant ramen and satiate her hunger. The next day, a barber named Kuratake shares his experiences of lending his services to the citizens of City and their kindness, as he also improves City's infrastructure. Nagumo later participates in a quiz contest and wins worthless prizes, leaving her furious.
8	"Tanabe's Love Affair"; Transliteration: "Tanabe-san no Koiwazurai★" (Japanese: タナベさんの恋わずらい★)	Takuya Yamamura	Ayano Sato	Kayo Hikiyama	August 25, 2025
8	"Officer's Willpower"; Transliteration: "Honkan no Iji" (Japanese: 本官の意地)	Takuya Yamamura	Ayano Sato	Kayo Hikiyama	August 25, 2025
8	"Altogether"; Transliteration: "Manzara" (Japanese: 満更)	Takuya Yamamura	Ayano Sato	Kayo Hikiyama	August 25, 2025
8	"Tekaridake's Playwright Spirit"; Transliteration: "Tekaridake no Enshutsu Sakka Tamashī" (Japanese: 光岳の演出作家魂)	Takuya Yamamura	Ayano Sato	Kayo Hikiyama	August 25, 2025
8	"Boutique"; Transliteration: "Butikku" (Japanese: ブティック)	Takuya Yamamura	Ayano Sato	Kayo Hikiyama	August 25, 2025
8	"Deployment"; Transliteration: "Shutsujin" (Japanese: 出陣)	Takuya Yamamura	Ayano Sato	Kayo Hikiyama	August 25, 2025
8	"First Love"; Transliteration: "Hatsukoi" (Japanese: 初恋)	Takuya Yamamura	Ayano Sato	Kayo Hikiyama	August 25, 2025
8	"Tekaridake Troupe 7th Production 'Throat'"; Transliteration: "Gekidan Tekaridake Dai Nanakai Kōen 'Nodo'" (Japanese: 劇団テカリダケ第7回公演『のど』)	Takuya Yamamura	Ayano Sato	Kayo Hikiyama	August 25, 2025
Tanabe becomes smitten with Tatsuta Adatara, so Hotaka advises she ask Tatsuta out. Tanabe complies but mistakes his father to be Tatsuta. During a sweltering day, a police officer successfully averts falling for Riko as he continues to admire Wako. Meanwhile, Tatewaku, Matsuri, and Ecchan decide to form a band and think of their name. Nagumo visits Tekaridake to learn of her involvement in his upcoming play. Tatewaku later visits a boutique to buy clothes in preparation for a date with Riko, where he buys a tattered shirt. Matsuri, Ecchan, and Tsurubishi are left aghast upon seeing Tatewaku wear the shirt, and they desperately hold their laughter when they recommend him to go out with more tattered clothing. Tatewaku heads to the Izumi household and accompanies Riko. The two head to the theater where Tekaridake's play, titled Throat, is being held. Nagumo participates in the play as an actor, and the play ends up as a resounding success. Tekaridake awards Nagumo with a rice coupon as thanks.
9	"The 4th City Race"; Transliteration: "Dai Shikai CITY Rēsu" (Japanese: 第4回CITYレース)	Ryo Miyaki	Masashi Nishikawa	Nobuaki Maruki	September 1, 2025
9	"Champion"; Transliteration: "Hasha" (Japanese: 覇者)	Ryo Miyaki	Masashi Nishikawa	Nobuaki Maruki	September 1, 2025
The 4th City Race commences with a prize of 1 million yen on the line, and Nagumo and Niikura join alongside the other citizens of City, who have their own intentions with the prize money. The duo sticks together to avoid disqualification, with Niikura especially motivated to win to get her pendant back from a member of the City South High soccer team. After passing the second checkpoint, Nagumo and Niikura are halted by a giant maze. Niikura intends to drop out, but Nagumo is determined to make them win, and they accomplish the maze. More participants eventually join the race, causing chaos in the track. Niikura motivates a demoralized Nagumo to continue despite the impossible conditions. As the race enters its final stretch, everyone makes a dash to the finish line, during which Niikura finds out to her anger that the pendant is not hers. Matsuri and Ecchan become the winners of the race, and Wako reveals she helped them by setting up traps along the track, shocking everyone. Sometime after the race, Matsuri and Ecchan are unable to decide how to spend the prize money.
10	"That Day, That Summer"; Transliteration: "Ano Hi Ano Natsu" (Japanese: あの日あの夏)	Kohei Okamura	Ayano Sato	Miku Kadowaki	September 8, 2025
10	"Video Distribution Company: Nagumo"; Transliteration: "Dōga Haishin-sha Nagumo" (Japanese: 動画配信者・南雲)	Kohei Okamura	Ayano Sato	Miku Kadowaki	September 8, 2025
10	"Straw Delivery"; Transliteration: "Warashibe Demae" (Japanese: わらしべ出前)	Kohei Okamura	Ayano Sato	Miku Kadowaki	September 8, 2025
10	"Self-Esteem"; Transliteration: "Jisonshin" (Japanese: 自尊心)	Kohei Okamura	Ayano Sato	Miku Kadowaki	September 8, 2025
10	"Riko Izumi FC"; Transliteration: "Izumi Riko FC" (Japanese: 泉りこFC)	Kohei Okamura	Ayano Sato	Miku Kadowaki	September 8, 2025
10	"Make Your Mark on History! Class 2-3!"; Transliteration: "Rekishi ni na O Kizamikome! Ninen Sankumi!" (Japanese: 歴史に名を刻み込め！2年3組！)	Kohei Okamura	Ayano Sato	Miku Kadowaki	September 8, 2025
10	"Old Man Summer"; Transliteration: "Oyaji Samā" (Japanese: おやじサマー)	Kohei Okamura	Ayano Sato	Miku Kadowaki	September 8, 2025
10	"New TV Program"; Transliteration: "Shin Bangumi" (Japanese: 新番組)	Kohei Okamura	Ayano Sato	Miku Kadowaki	September 8, 2025
10	"Next Episode"; Transliteration: "Jikai Yokoku" (Japanese: 次回予告)	Kohei Okamura	Ayano Sato	Miku Kadowaki	September 8, 2025
While reminiscing on their youth, Tsurubishi, Mr. Adatara, and Weekly City's lead editor-in-chief decide to spend the summer break to relive it. The decision leads to the Western Bistro closing for the summer, prompting Niikura to try convincing Nagumo to wear a cute outfit and film a video to earn money. Nagumo conducts several odd jobs as part of this, including delivering food for a different restaurant and helping Tekaridake with his next production titled Self-Esteem. Meanwhile, Tatewaku heads to Riko's house to invite her on a date when he is confronted by members of an apparent fan club for Riko led by his soccer team's captain. Tatewaku claims that Riko likes him back only for Riko to deny it, leaving him heartbroken. The two later get involved in their class' attempts to be remembered before the end of summer through an innovative phrase to no avail. Elsewhere, Tsurubishi, Mr. Adatara, and the editor-in-chief head to the beach during a downpour, which slowly overwhelms them. Previews of the "next episode" showcase Tatewaku trying to date Riko again that leads to them escaping from a remote island. Despite this, Tatewaku fails to charm her.
11	"Morning Routine"; Transliteration: "Mōningu Rūtin" (Japanese: モーニングルーティン)	Taichi Ogawa	Masashi Nishikawa	Mariko Takahashi	September 15, 2025
11	"Bonjour Everyone"; Transliteration: "Bonjūru Minanoshū★" (Japanese: ボンジュ〜ルみなの衆★)	Taichi Ogawa	Masashi Nishikawa	Mariko Takahashi	September 15, 2025
11	"Living in the City"; Transliteration: "CITY Zaijū" (Japanese: CITY在住)	Taichi Ogawa	Masashi Nishikawa	Mariko Takahashi	September 15, 2025
11	"Surprising Shogi"; Transliteration: "Bikkuri Shōgi" (Japanese: びっくり将棋)	Taichi Ogawa	Masashi Nishikawa	Mariko Takahashi	September 15, 2025
11	"A Boring Afternoon - Mambo No. 5"; Transliteration: "Tasha na Gogo 〜 Manbo Nanbā 5 〜" (Japanese: たいくつな午後〜マンボNo.5〜)	Taichi Ogawa	Masashi Nishikawa	Mariko Takahashi	September 15, 2025
11	"Toudou and Lingering Thoughts"; Transliteration: "Tōdō to Zanryū Shinen" (Japanese: 東堂と残留思念)	Taichi Ogawa	Masashi Nishikawa	Mariko Takahashi	September 15, 2025
Niikura records her morning routine in the hopes of becoming famous online as Nagumo walks in on Niikura speaking to herself, leaving the latter embarrassed. At Weekly City's headquarters, Todoroki reviews a manuscript written by Naganohara to serve as a replacement to Mr. Bummer, only to be shocked by its risqué material. He pleads Kamaboko to return, as their silent exchange is successfully interpreted by a zealous Wako. Meanwhile, Mimineko discusses with various animals on the benefits and downsides of living in City. A game of shogi begins as the players use unorthodox tactics to progress the game. Back at Mokumesei Manor, Nagumo and Niikura continue filming and Niikura repeatedly assures Nagumo they can become viral once they add "Mambo No. 5" as background music. Later in the day, Kuratake visits the antiques shop to donate a few items given to him by the citizens of City. The antiques shop owner, Toudou, sees their worth with his innate thinking and prices them highly, confusing Kuratake. The end-credits scene reveals Nagumo and Niikura's produced video with "Mambo No. 5", leaving them proud of their work.
12	"'Summer' Photo Contest"; Transliteration: "'Natsu' no Shashin Kontesuto" (Japanese: 「夏」の写真コンテスト)	Noriyuki Kitanohara	Ayano Sato	Kengo Narimatsu	September 22, 2025
12	"Niikura and the Road"; Transliteration: "Niikura to Michi" (Japanese: にーくらと道)	Noriyuki Kitanohara	Ayano Sato	Kengo Narimatsu	September 22, 2025
12	"City Grand Prize"; Transliteration: "CITY Taishō Ten" (Japanese: CITY大賞典)	Noriyuki Kitanohara	Ayano Sato	Kengo Narimatsu	September 22, 2025
12	"Farewell Speech"; Transliteration: "O Wakare no Aisatsu" (Japanese: お別れのあいさつ)	Noriyuki Kitanohara	Ayano Sato	Kengo Narimatsu	September 22, 2025
12	"Vocabulary"; Transliteration: "Goi" (Japanese: 語彙)	Noriyuki Kitanohara	Ayano Sato	Kengo Narimatsu	September 22, 2025
12	"Wishing on a Star"; Transliteration: "Hoshi ni Negai wo" (Japanese: 星に願いを)	Noriyuki Kitanohara	Ayano Sato	Kengo Narimatsu	September 22, 2025
Nagumo and Niikura decide to join Wako at a photo contest, where they see Nagumo being the winner. Niikura later finds her locket at the antiques shop, leaving her determined to purchase it back. She becomes distracted by a mysterious white creature and repeatedly punches it before collapsing from exhaustion, and she wakes up to find the locket in her possession. Meanwhile, Nagumo listens to a horse race in the hopes of winning through the horse she bet on, only to learn that the horse was disqualified. She regains hope upon hearing that the disqualified horse is allowed to run in the race again and wins, though the horse is disqualified again when it is discovered to actually be a gazelle much to Nagumo's despair. Ecchan travels to the Western Bistro to say her farewells to Matsuri, who she brainwashes into forgetting her. Inside the bistro, Tsurubishi, Mr. Adatara, and the editor-in-chief celebrate their summer break by drinking sake. The trio progressively becomes drunk and lose themselves, which is exacerbated after Nagumo joins in. Later at night, Nagumo, Niikura, and Wako observe shooting stars outside Mokumesei Manor and take the opportunity to pray for their future.
13	"Forever Young"; Transliteration: "Fōebā Yangu" (Japanese: フォーエヴァーヤング)	Taichi Ishidate & Takuya Yamamura	Ayano Sato	Tamami Tokuyama, Kayo Hikiyama & Nobuaki Maruki	September 29, 2025
As summer draws to a close, Niikura asks Nagumo if she found anything fun, which Nagumo remarks she found every day to be enjoyable. The next day, Matsuri enlists Ryōta's help in finding Ecchan and they travel to the airport. Ecchan and Matsuri share their heartfelt farewells and Ecchan boards her flight to England. Sometime later, the Western Bistro is awarded with one Michelin star, prompting Tsurubishi to lavishly celebrate the occasion with all of City's citizens. A musical number ensues where various topics are discussed, like the group preparing more food for the feast, their discovery that the Michelin star award is fake, and the restaurant suddenly receiving several orders, among others. Dr. Adatara showcases a time machine to the group and they all decide to use it to travel back in time, only for the time machine to break down.

== Reception ==
At San Diego Comic-Con 2019, Rob McMonigal picked the series as the best continuing series for grown-ups.

The series has been praised by most critics. Sean Gaffney from A Case Suitable for Treatment gave the series praise, saying it "made him smile". Ian Wolf from Anime UK News stated that he liked the series, stating that fans of Arawi's style in Nichijou will also like this series. Ross Locksley from UK Anime Network felt similarly about the manga, rating it a seven and saying the rating is a nine for fans of Nichijou and a five for anyone else. However, Katherine Dacey from The Manga Critic was more critical, calling the series' jokes "tired slapstick [humor]" and the characters "strenuously unpleasant".

=== Accolades ===
Year	Award	Category	Recipient	Result	Ref.
2026	21st AnimaniA Awards	Best TV Series: Online	City the Animation	Nominated	
2026	10th Crunchyroll Anime Awards	Best Comedy	City the Animation	Nominated	
2026	10th Crunchyroll Anime Awards	Best Slice of Life	City the Animation	Nominated	
2026	10th Crunchyroll Anime Awards	Best Background Art	City the Animation	Nominated	
2026	Japan Expo Awards	Best Slice of Life Anime	City the Animation	Won	
2026	Japan Expo Awards	Best Anime	City the Animation	Nominated	
