= Nichijou =

Japanese manga series

- First volume cover

日常 (Nichijō)
- Genre: Slice of life; Surreal comedy
- Manga
- Written by: Keiichi Arawi
- Published by: Kadokawa Shoten
- English publisher: NA: JManga (former); Vertical (vol. 1–10); Kodansha USA (vol. 11–)
- Magazine: Monthly Shōnen Ace; Comptiq
- Original run: December 2006 – present
- Volumes: 12
- Original video animation

Nichijou Episode 0
- Directed by: Tatsuya Ishihara
- Produced by: Atsushi Itō; Hideaki Hatta
- Written by: Jukki Hanada
- Music by: Yūji Nomi
- Studio: Kyoto Animation
- Licensed by: AU: Madman Entertainment; BI: Manga Entertainment; NA: Funimation Entertainment (Note: Previously licensed by Bandai Entertainment. Acquired by Funimation Entertainment in 2016 for North American audiences.)
- Released: March 12, 2011
- Runtime: 24 minutes
- Anime television series

Nichijou - My Ordinary Life
- Directed by: Tatsuya Ishihara
- Produced by: Atsushi Itō; Hideaki Hatta
- Written by: Jukki Hanada
- Music by: Yūji Nomi
- Studio: Kyoto Animation
- Licensed by: AU: Madman Entertainment; BI: Manga Entertainment; NA: Funimation Entertainment
- Original network: TV Aichi, Chiba TV, TV Saitama, KBS, tvk, TSS, Sun TV, Tokyo MX, MRO, GTV, FBC, TBC, TUT, TVQ, TSC, TVh
- Original run: April 3, 2011 – September 25, 2011
- Episodes: 26
- Video game

Nichijou: Uchuujin
- Developer: Vridge
- Publisher: Kadokawa Shoten
- Genre: Visual novel
- Platform: PlayStation Portable
- Released: July 28, 2011
- icon

Nichijou (Japanese: 日常, Hepburn: Nichijō; lit. "Everyday Life") (stylized in all lowercase) is a Japanese manga series written and illustrated by Keiichi Arawi. The manga began serialization in the December 2006 issue of Kadokawa Shoten's manga magazine Shōnen Ace, and was also serialized in Comptiq between the March 2007 and July 2008 issues. Kadokawa Shoten later published all chapters of the series' initial run in ten tankōbon volumes from July 2007 to December 2015. After a six-year hiatus, the manga began serialization again in 2021.

Set in Gunma Prefecture, Nichijou is populated by an ensemble set of characters, featuring moments from their everyday lives which alternate between the mundane and the strange, without strong focus on a narrative. A 26-episode anime television series directed by Tatsuya Ishihara and produced by Kyoto Animation was broadcast on independent television stations from April 3 to September 21, 2011, after an earlier original video animation (OVA) was released in March. The series became known in English as My Ordinary Life. A PlayStation Portable game by Vridge and Kadokawa Shoten was released on July 28, 2011, entitled Nichijou: Uchuujin.

The manga and anime series were initially licensed in North America by Bandai Entertainment in July 2011, but both releases were cancelled due to the company's downsizing. The manga series was later licensed for publication in English by Vertical, with the first volume released in March 2016. Funimation released the anime in North America with subtitles on Blu-ray Disc and DVD on February 7, 2017. An English dub was later created for the Blu-ray re-release on July 23, 2019. Madman Entertainment licensed the anime series in 2011 for Australian and New Zealand distribution, releasing the DVDs in April and May 2013.

The anime adaptation initially received reserved praise from Western critics, who commended the animation quality but found it lacking in consistent humor and substance. Retrospective reviews, however, have since given the series high critical acclaim for its heart and surreal comedy, with critic Nick Creamer deeming it among the "finest anime comedies of all time".

== Plot ==
Nichijou follows the everyday lives of various people in the town of Tokisadame, Gunma, centering on the energetic Yūko Aioi, the bright and cheerful Mio Naganohara, the quiet and deadpan Mai Minakami, the anxious android Nano Shinonome, her young creator, the Professor (Hakase), and a talking black cat named Sakamoto, along with an ensemble cast of characters. Random, outlandish events regularly occur throughout the series, mainly through the mundane situations each character goes through.

In the anime series, Nano receives the most prominent story arc out of all the characters; the first half of Nichijou involves her desire to become a student in high school, while the second half deals with her fear of being exposed as a robot while at school. Vignettes which are mostly unrelated to the main focus of the series are placed throughout each episode, some of them adapted from Helvetica Standard, another manga by Arawi.

== Characters ==
=== Main characters ===
Yūko Aioi (相生 祐子, Aioi Yūko)
Voiced by: Mariko Honda (Japanese); Morgan Garrett (English)
Yūko (or Yuuko) is an energetic sixteen-year-old high school girl with short brown hair. Yūko's main desire in life is to make every day more fun and interesting than normal, often at other's or her own expense. Because she is often too lazy to do her own homework, she always copies from either Mio or Mai instead. Although she is a generally easygoing person, her mood changes instantly when she is insulted. She often greets people with her catchphrase "selamat pagi" (Malay and Indonesian for "good morning") in a bid to make simple greetings more interesting.
Mio Naganohara (長野原 みお, Naganohara Mio)
Voiced by: Mai Aizawa (Japanese); Leah Clark (English)
Mio is a bright and cheerful girl with pastel-blue hair pulled into pigtails and held by two small wooden cubes, which are her most identifiable feature. She has a crush on Kōjirō. Though ordinary-looking in comparison to her friends Yūko and Mai, Mio harbors a very short temper, prone to tantrums and acts of violence in order to avoid humiliation, even assaulting a police officer to keep her yaoi manuscript from being discovered. She often has to humor Yūko to make her happy. Being a talented artist, she occasionally draws homoerotic pictures of Kōjirō in her notebooks and, under a male pseudonym, has entered several erotic manga into contests that promise serialization to the winner. Near the end of the manga, Mio finally wins one of the contests she entered, though it is unclear if she actually accepted the publisher's offer due to her paranoia about her art. She is sixteen years old. Accordingly to a daydream of Yūko's, the cubes in her hair are supposedly magical artifacts from a Fey Kingdom zeppelin that fell on her head. Mio has minor appearances in City. Here Mio is a mangaka artist who is only referred by the pen name of "Daisuke" and is a very successful and famous manga artist.
Mai Minakami (水上 麻衣, Minakami Mai)
Voiced by: Misuzu Togashi (Japanese); Brittany Lauda (English)
Mai is a quiet and intelligent girl who wears glasses. Before the events of the manga series, Mai had lived in Alaska and moved to Japan due to her father's job. Likely as a result of this, Mai is fascinated by Shinto shrines and will always visit whenever she sees one. She excels at a wide range of activities, including fishing, wood carving, and arm wrestling. Despite her serene and rather unemotional demeanor, she has an eccentric sense of humor and will often provoke Yūko with a variety of gags in order to gauge a reaction out of her, much to Yūko's chagrin. She has two pet dogs named Oguri Cap and Pyon.
Nano Shinonome (東雲 なの, Shinonome Nano)
Voiced by: Shizuka Furuya (Japanese); Monica Rial (English)
Nano is an android schoolgirl, built by the Professor. Despite being a year old, she has the height and appearance of an average teenager. She worries about keeping her identity as a robot from other people, even though the large wind-up key on her back makes it quite obvious. Her limbs will sometimes fall apart, revealing items that the Professor installed into her system without her noticing, ranging from beam-firing weapons to Swiss rolls. She acts like the Professor's caretaker, and spends her days helping her and doing all the household chores. Nano's main goal in life is to go to school, which the Professor eventually grants, resulting in her befriending Yūko's group of friends. Although she was technically never born, her "birthday" is March 7.
The Professor (Hakase) (はかせ, Hakase)
Voiced by: Hiromi Konno (Japanese); Jad Saxton (English)
The Professor is an intelligent eight-year-old scientist. She built Nano herself, and often makes various adjustments to her, but adamantly refuses to remove the wind-up key on her back because she thinks it is cute. Her favorite animal is the shark. She does not go to school, since she already graduated, and instead spends her days playing around in the house. Despite her intelligence, she acts like a spoiled child most of the time, as she throws tantrums to get what she wants. She likes snacking, playing around, and sharks. She also enjoys spending time with Nano's friends, particularly Yūko due to her approval of "cool things" and Mai because she gives her shark-themed chocolates and drawings. She didn't like Mai at first because she let her dogs corner her and Sakamoto on the street, but warms up to her when Mai draws a shark for her.
Sakamoto (阪本, Sakamoto)
Voiced by: Minoru Shiraishi (Japanese); Anthony Bowling (English)
Sakamoto is a black cat. He wears a red scarf made by the Professor, which allows him to speak. He was originally named Taisho and was Kana's pet until he fell out of the window of her house. He was then found by the Professor before mysteriously turning up at the Shinonome Lab. He decided to stay with Nano and the Professor because of his relative luxury at the home in contrast to Kana's constant unintentional neglect. In cat years, he is 20 years old, older than both Nano and the Professor, and tries to act like the adult of the house, but he occasionally succumbs to his shameful catlike habits. A running gag is his tendency to endure the Professor's comically horrific physical abuse, usually in the form of a childish booby trap or the rope noose that she uses to walk him.

=== Teachers ===
Izumi Sakurai (桜井 泉, Sakurai Izumi)
Voiced by: Mami Kosuge (Japanese); Tabitha Ray (English)
Izumi is a young, constantly flustered, and easily frightened teacher. She is an English teacher, a career adviser, and a school counselor. She tries to enforce the school rules, but is typically unable to accomplish much due to her passivity. Even though she is often nervous and a pushover at school, she is marginally bolder when it comes to her younger brother Makoto, once confronting him about an erotic magazine found in his room.
Manabu Takasaki (高崎 学, Takasaki Manabu)
Voiced by: Tetsu Inada (Japanese); Shawn Gann (English)
Manabu is a male teacher who has romantic feelings for Izumi, but is unable to tell her as he thinks too much and is too shy to admit it. These feelings lead him to become the club adviser for the go-soccer club after Makoto bribes him with pictures of his sister.
The Principal (Shinonome) (校長先生 (東雲), Kōchō-sensei (Shinonome))
Voiced by: Chō (Japanese); Francis Henry (English)
The Principal is the middle-aged bald principal of Tokisadame High, where part of the story is set. While known for his old jokes and puns, unknown to most, he is a talented wrestler. He is referred to as "Principal Shinonome" implying that he may be the Professor's father or relative, but this was never revealed in the series.
The Vice Principal (Kōsuke Ōra) (教頭先生 (邑楽 耕介), Kyōtō-sensei (Ōra Kōsuke))
Voiced by: Hiroshi Naka (Japanese); Charlie Campbell (English)
The Vice Principal is known for wearing glasses and a yellow tie. He hates the Principal and doesn't hide the mean things he does to him. He was the previous principal of the school and is incredibly bitter about his demotion, so much so that he began to drink heavily and send daily death curses to the Principal. His constant drinking and stress have utterly destroyed his body, and he describes himself as being one drink away from liver failure at all times.
Kana Nakamura (中村 かな, Nakamura Kana)
Voiced by: Kaoru Mizuhara (Japanese); Lydia Mackay (English)
Kana is a science teacher who is fixated on Nano's robotic nature. She constantly schemes to capture Nano for study, but her machinations invariably backfire, like drinking coffee from the same tranquilizer-spiked jug she had intended for Nano. As such, it is a running joke that she is not there to take classes very often, having fainted from one of her escapades, resulting in many students asking, "Has Ms. Nakamura collapsed again?"

=== Students ===
Kōjirō Sasahara (笹原 幸治郎, Sasahara Kōjirō)
Voiced by: Yoshihisa Kawahara (Japanese); Seth Magill (English)
Kōjirō is a flamboyant high school boy who acts like an aristocratic lawyer when in reality his family are just farmers. He likes to ride his goat Kojirō (named after himself) to school and is often seen with his butler. He is very suave and, despite not having many friends, is the object of affection from most girls in the school, yet acts like any other teenage boy, which most girls willfully ignore to preserve their "Prince Charming" mental image of him. Kōjirō used to take kendo lessons with Yoshino, Mio, and Misato, which resulted in the latter two developing feelings for him.
Misato Tachibana (立花 みさと, Tachibana Misato)
Voiced by: Chika Horikawa (Japanese); Madeleine Morris (English)
Misato is a peach-haired high school girl who generally acts as a tsukkomi towards Kōjirō whenever he does anything to annoy her. However, Misato does this by shooting him with various guns and heavy weaponry that come out of nowhere. In reality, Misato has feelings for Kōjirō, but due to her tsundere attitude, she constantly denies her feelings or shoots Kōjirō if he annoys her.
Tsuyoshi Nakanojō (中之条 剛, Nakanojō Tsuyoshi)
Voiced by: Kazutomi Yamamoto (Japanese); Kyle Igneczi (English)
Tsuyoshi is a fifteen-year-old student with simplistic eyes and a natural blonde mohawk which he detests. He wants to be a scientist in the future and thus doesn't believe in the supernatural, but his attempts to disprove supernatural phenomena usually end up with the proof of them being "confirmed", or with embarrassing situations for him.
Haruna Annaka (安中 榛名, Annaka Haruna)
Voiced by: Kaori Sadohara (Japanese); Kristen McGuire (English)
Haruna is a girl with a large ribbon on her head. She sometimes runs into crazy individuals much to her confusion. She likes to read manga.
Kenzaburō Daiku (大工 健三郎, Daiku Kenzaburō)
Voiced by: Ryota Yoshizaki (Japanese); Stephen Fu (English)
Kenzaburō is a brown-haired boy who is the president of the go-soccer club, which he founded without any knowledge of it being an actual sport. The club eventually became a legitimate team due to a sudden influx of skilled players and has since won the prefectural tournament and was heading to the national championships, but Kenzaburo now wonders why he even stays on the team, as the club has become so far removed from the original intent of it being a place to relax. His rich father is the president of Daiku Industries, which owns many of the businesses visited by the main characters.
Yuria Sekiguchi (関口 ユリア, Sekiguchi Yuria)
Voiced by: Ai Hirosaka (Japanese); Apphia Yu (English)
Yuria is a quiet girl who is a member of the go-soccer club. She has a crush on Kenzaburō and stays in the club so that he will not be lonely. Like Tsuyoshi, she also has simplistic eyes.
Makoto Sakurai (桜井 誠, Sakurai Makoto)
Voiced by: Takahiro Hikami (Japanese); Dallas Reid (English)
Makoto is Izumi's younger brother, who joins the go-soccer club. He is very skilled at the sport and helps the club grow by bribing Manabu into becoming their advisor with pictures of his sister in her high school years.
Tanaka (田中)
Voiced by: Kota Yamaguchi (Japanese); Tyson Rinehart (English)
Tanaka is a boy who wears a large black afro wig. He is friends with Tsuyoshi.
Weboshī (ウェボシー)
Voiced by: Yoko Tamaoki (Japanese); Kathryn Taylor Rose (English)
Weboshī is Misato's green-haired classmate, who has a ponytail. Her real name is not given.
Fe (フェっちゃん)
Voiced by: Yumi Higuchi (Japanese); Kara Edwards (English)
Fe is Misato's orange-haired classmate. She ends her sentences with "fe". Her real name is not given.
Mihoshi Tachibana (立花 みほし, Tachibana Mihoshi)
Voiced by: Manami Honda (Japanese); Emily Neves (English)
Mihoshi is Misato's younger sister and a kendo student. She envies her senior Yoshino's extreme talent in the sport despite rarely practicing.
Yoshino Naganohara (長野原 よしの, Naganohara Yoshino)
Voiced by: Motoko Kobayashi (Japanese); Maxey Whitehead (English)
Yoshino is Mio's easygoing older sister who goes to college. She likes to wear costumes and often plays pranks on others. She is also Misato and Mihoshi's senior in kendo, a sport she is naturally talented at, but does not practice at the dojo very often.

== Media ==
=== Manga ===
Nichijou began as a manga series written and illustrated by Keiichi Arawi. It uses a combination of normal comic format and four-panel comic strips. Originally, the manga was meant to be a short, stand-alone series which was serialized in Kadokawa Shoten's Shōnen Ace magazine between the May and October 2006 issues. Starting with the December 2006 issue, the manga began regular serialization in Shōnen Ace, and was also serialized in Kadokawa's Comptiq magazine between the March 2007 and July 2008 issues. The first tankōbon volume was released in Japan on July 26, 2007. The manga series ended with its tenth volume, which was released on December 10, 2015, along with a limited edition commemorating the tenth anniversary of the series, which included a 120-page companion book. On October 20, 2021, Arawi announced Nichijou would be serializing again in Monthly Shōnen Ace from October 26, 2021, and an eleventh volume of the manga was released on December 26, 2022. As of October 25, 2024, twelve volumes have been released.

Bandai Entertainment initially licensed the manga in July 2011, but later cancelled its release by October due to downsizing of the company. JManga, an American digital manga platform, was able to release the first four volumes of the manga through its website before shutting down in May 2013. The manga series was later licensed for publication in English by Vertical, which released ten volumes in 2016 and 2017. Kodansha USA released subsequent volumes, starting with volume eleven in August 2023. Beginning in January 2012, the manga has been released in Finland by Punainen jättiläinen under the name Arki, which is Finnish for "weekday". It was translated into Finnish by Antti Kokkonen. It is also published in Germany by Egmont Manga and France by Noeve Grafx, both starting in 2023.

==== Volumes ====
No.	Original release date	Original ISBN	English release date	English ISBN
1	July 26, 2007	978-4-04-713949-7	March 29, 2016	978-1-942993-30-8
2	October 26, 2007	978-4-04-713980-0	May 3, 2016	978-1-942993-31-5
3	July 26, 2008	978-4-04-715089-8	July 5, 2016	978-1-942993-32-2
4	January 26, 2009	978-4-04-715171-0	September 6, 2016	978-1-942993-33-9
5	October 26, 2009	978-4-04-715311-0	November 1, 2016	978-1-942993-34-6
6	March 26, 2011	978-4-04-715651-7	January 10, 2017	978-1-942993-65-0
7	October 26, 2011	978-4-04-120025-4	March 7, 2017	978-1-942993-66-7
8	October 26, 2012	978-4-04-120456-6	May 2, 2017	978-1-942993-67-4
9	December 10, 2013	978-4-04-120880-9	July 4, 2017	978-1-942993-68-1
10	December 26, 2015	978-4-04-103335-7	September 19, 2017	978-1-942993-69-8
11	December 26, 2022	978-4-04-113263-0	August 29, 2023	978-1-64729-326-0
12	October 25, 2024	978-4-04-115620-9	October 21, 2025	978-1-64-729345-1

=== Anime ===
Kyoto Animation adapted the Nichijou manga into a 26-episode anime television series and an original video animation (OVA) episode. The anime adaptation was first announced on May 22, 2010, through the July issue of Shōnen Ace magazine. The OVA, titled Nichijou Episode 0, was directed by Kazuya Sakamoto and bundled as a DVD extra with volume six of the manga series on March 12, 2011. Series composer Yūji Nomi orchestrated the score in Hungary. The anime series aired in Japan on TV Aichi from April 3 to September 25, 2011, with the final episode written by Arawi, the creator of the original manga. It was also simulcast by Crunchyroll under the name My Ordinary Life. The series was re-edited into twelve episodes for broadcast on NHK Educational TV in January 2012. The series also incorporates skits from Arawi's other manga, Helvetica Standard (ヘルベチカスタンダード, Herubechika Sutandādo), which is published in Kadokawa Shoten's Newtype magazine. Bandai Entertainment had originally licensed the anime, but its release was later cancelled. However, Madman Entertainment managed to release the series in Australia and New Zealand with subtitles only. It was released as a two-part collection containing 13 episodes each. The first part was released on April 11, 2013, while the second part was released on May 9, 2013. Funimation later licensed the series in North America and released it on February 7, 2017, with subtitles. Funimation re-released the series with a dub on July 23, 2019. On December 13, 2021, Funimation released two Blu-ray editions of the Nichijou anime for the United Kingdom and Ireland; a standard edition, and a limited edition which includes a rigid box, a 36-page art book, and six art cards. The Funimation-produced English dub of the series became available on the Crunchyroll service from March 2022.

==== Production credits ====
- Series director: Tatsuya Ishihara
- Series writer: Jukki Hanada
- Producer: Atsushi Itō
- Producer: Hideaki Hatta
- Production supervisor: Takeshi Yasuda
- Character design: Futoshi Nishiya
- Art director: Joji Unoguchi
- Composer: Yūji Nomi
- Music producer: Shigeru Saitō (of Lantis)
- Photography director: Kazuya Takao
- Editor: Kengo Shigemura (of Studio Gong)
- Sound director: Yota Tsuruoka
- Sound effects: Eiko Morikawa
- Series writing cooperation: Keiichi Arawi

==== Theme songs ====
Opening themes

- "Hyadain no Kakakata Kataomoi - C" (ヒャダインのカカカタ☆カタオモイ-C; "Hyadain's U-u-u-u☆unrequited Love - C") by Hyadain (episodes 1–6, 8–13)
- "Hyadain no Jōjō Yūjō" (ヒャダインのじょーじょーゆーじょー; "Hyadain's Amazing Friendship") by Hyadain (episodes 14–23, 25)

Ending themes

Ending themes
Episode	Title	Composer	Notes	Performer
1–5	"Zzz" (ja)	Kenichi Maeyamada	Original song	Sayaka Sasaki
6–9	"Zzz (A cappella version)"	Kenichi Maeyamada	Original song	Sayaka Sasaki
10–13	"Zzz (Bossa Nova Version)"	Kenichi Maeyamada	Original song	Sayaka Sasaki
14	"Tsubasa o Kudasai" (翼をください; "Give us Wings")	Murai Kunihiko	Folk music (A cover of the song by Akai Tori, 1971)	Sayaka Sasaki
15	"Kikyū ni Notte Doko made mo" (気球にのってどこまでも; "On a Balloon to Anywhere")	Takekuni Hirayoshi	Chorus of elementary school students (The 41st NHK All-Japan School Music Competition in 1974, a set piece of part of the elementary school)	Nano (Shizuka Furuya); Professor (Hiromi Konno); Sakamoto (Minoru Shiraishi)
16	"My Ballad" (マイバラード, Mai Barādo)	Takao Matsui	Chorus of junior high school students (publication in 1987)	Sayaka Sasaki
17	"Kaijū no Ballad" (怪獣のバラード, Kaijū no Barādo; "Monster's Ballad")	Osamu Shōji	Chorus of elementary and junior high school students (A cover of the song by Young 101 in NHK TV program Stage 101 (ja), 1972)	Yūko (Mariko Honda); Mio (Mai Aizawa); Mai (Misuzu Togashi)
18	"Green, Green" (グリーングリーン, Gurīn Gurīn)	Barry McGuire, Randy Sparks	Folk music (A cover of the song by The New Christy Minstrels, 1963)	Sayaka Sasaki
19	"Yasei no Uma" (野生の馬; "Wild Horse")	Saburō Iwakawa	Chorus of junior high school students	Mr. Takasaki (Tetsu Inada); Ms. Sakurai (Mami Kosuge); Ms. Nakamura (Kaoru Mizuhara); Makoto Sakurai (Takahiro Hikami); Yuria Sekiguchi (Ai Hirosaka); Haruna Annaka (Kaori Sadohara); Ogi (Ryōta Takeuchi)
20	"Ano Subarashii Ai o Mō Ichido" (あの素晴しい愛をもう一度; "That Wonderful Love Once Again")	Kazuhiko Katō	Folk music (A cover of the song by Osamu Kitayama & Kazuhiko Katō, 1971)	Sayaka Sasaki
21	"Sudachi no Uta" (巣立ちの歌; "Song of Leaving the Nest")	Saburō Iwakawa	Graduation song (publication in 1965)	Sasahara (Yoshihisa Kawahara); Misato (Chika Horikawa); Nakanojo (Kazutomi Yamamoto); Weboshī (Yōko Tamaoki); Fe-chan (Yumi Higuchi)
22	"Aogeba Tōtoshi" (仰げば尊し; "With an Eternally Grateful Heart")	unknown composer commissioned by the Ministry of Education	Graduation song (from a songs book published by Ministry of Education in 1884 for elementary school students)	Sayaka Sasaki
23	"Sora ga Konna ni Aoi to wa" (空がこんなに青いとは; "The Sky is So Blue")	Teruyuki Noda	Chorus of elementary school students (The 37th NHK All-Japan School Music Competition in 1970, a set piece of part of the elementary school)	Professor (Hiromi Konno); Mai (Misuzu Togashi)
24	"Yūki Hitotsu o Tomo ni Shite" (勇気一つを友にして; "With One Courage as a Friend")	Nobuyoshi Koshibe	Chorus of elementary school students (A cover of the song by Miyako Yamada with Tokyo Broadcasting Children's Chorus Group in NHK TV and radio program Minna no Uta, 1975)	Sayaka Sasaki
25	"Let's Search for Tomorrow" (ja)	Akinori Ōsawa	Chorus of junior high school students (publication in 1989)	Yūko (Mariko Honda); Mio (Mai Aizawa); Mai (Misuzu Togashi)
26	"Tabidachi no Hi ni" (旅立ちの日に; "On a Day of the Departure")	Hiromi Sakamoto	Graduation song (publication in 1991)	Yūko (Mariko Honda); Mio (Mai Aizawa); Mai (Misuzu Togashi); Nano (Shizuka Furuya); Professor (Hiromi Konno); Sakamoto (Minoru Shiraishi)

Insert songs

- "Headlight, Taillight" (ヘッドライト・テールライト, Heddoraito Tēruraito), written and performed by Miyuki Nakajima (episode 19)

=== Video game ===
A PlayStation Portable video game titled Nichijou: Uchuujin (日常（宇宙人）; lit. "Everyday: Alien") developed by Vridge and published by Kadokawa Shoten was released solely in Japan on July 28, 2011. In the game, the player takes the role of a producer from "Galaxy TV" running the anime adaptation of the manga, whose objective is to keep the ratings high by correctly deciding on what unusual situation to insert in the show. The Japanese gaming magazine Famitsu gave the game a score of 27 out of 40 based on four individual reviews.

== Sales and reception ==
The Nichijou manga series sold 1,005,300 tankōbon volumes in 2011, reaching 49th place in the year's best-selling manga series chart released by Oricon. The manga has continued to see success following its six-year hiatus, with its 11th volume, released on December 26, 2022, ranking 8th on the weekly Oricon manga sales chart for the week of its release.

Despite the manga's success, the Nichijou anime adaptation reportedly had low BD and DVD sales, with animation director Shunji Suzuki noting that it did not come close to meeting the break-even-line. The first DVD volume sold 924 copies in its first week of sales, while the second and fourth BD volumes sold over 2,000 copies each in their first week.

Anime News Network (ANN) reviewer Carl Kimlinger gave the series' first seven episodes a B, stating that the anime is a "slice-of-life comedy with a penchant for lunacy and a taste for huggable cuteness...", giving praise especially to Kyoto Animation's lively animation of the series: "a rare chance to see talented animators fully indulging their love of the art." Fellow ANN reviewer Theron Martin stated in his review of "Nichijou Episode 1" that despite the series' ability to entertain, it is "absolutely not a series for everyone". Chris Beveridge of the now defunct Mania.com reviewed the first four episodes, giving each succeeding episode a lower grade (B for episode 1 down to D+ by episode 4). Beveridge stated in his review of episode 4 that "[Nichijou is] so full of fluff and pointlessness that it's hard to get enthused about."

After the North American Blu-ray release of Nichijou in February 2017, Nick Creamer of ANN gave a highly positive review for the series, considering it "one of the finest anime comedies of all time", in contrast to the reserved praise previously given by other reviewers. Creamer stated that "As a tumultuous collection of madcap skits, Nichijou is an unparalleled success.... Blessed by some of the most beautiful animation in recent memory, nearly every gag is elevated to some kind of surrealist beauty. Beyond that, the show's sense of heart is nearly as strong as its sense of humor." Beveridge would also revise his negative opinion of the series by 2017, giving it a grade of A+. He stated that "[Nichijou] is that rare cult series that has such high end values to it and so many layers and richness that people will overlook because it's a comedy that I cannot recommend it enough."

Crunchyroll's editorial team chose Nichijou as one of the twenty-five best anime of the 2010s decade and writer Kara Dennison commented it is "a relatable slice-of-life series" whose characters and "charming art-style, makes it impossible to look away".
