= Riho Furui =

Japanese singer and songwriter

- Born: April 10, 1991 (age 35); Hokkaido, Japan
- Genres: J-pop; R&B; Gospel music
- Occupations: Singer, songwriter
- Years active: 2016–present
- Label: Pony Canyon
- Website: www.furuiriho.com

Riho Furui (born April 10, 1991) is a Japanese singer and songwriter from Hokkaido who is affiliated with Pony Canyon. After being inspired by gospel music early in life, she made her debut as an indie singer in 2016. She released her first digital single "Rebirth" in 2019, and in 2025 she released the song "Hello", which was used as the opening theme to the anime series City: The Animation.

== Biography ==
Furui was born in Hokkaido on April 10, 1991. Her interest in music started at an early age, with her family listening to Japanese artists such as Ken Hirai, as well as Western artists like The Carpenters. She took piano lessons from kindergarten to elementary school. When she was in her fifth year of elementary school, her mother invited her to a gospel music performance at a church in Sapporo. She enjoyed the concert and was inspired to become a singer herself, joining a church choir where she would practice every Sunday.

While in university, Furui decided to take a leave of absence to study English in Toronto, Canada, where she stayed from 2014 to 2015. She found life there difficult, being unable to find a job and depleting her savings, although she was able to survive through the support of her friends. Her time in Canada proved to be a life-changing experience for her as she realized her personal weaknesses there. After returning from Canada, she made her debut as an indie singer under the name Riho in 2016, releasing the song "Believe". The song was inspired by her experiences living abroad.

In 2019, Furui released the song "Rebirth", which she describes as her breakout song. She became more active as a singer after that, releasing several songs and hosting radio programs. She released her first album Green Light in 2022. In 2023 she released the song "LOA", which is an abbreviation for "Love One Another". Her second album, Love One Another, was released in 2024. In 2025, she released her first anime tie-up song under Pony Canyon, "Hello", which was used as the opening theme to the anime television series City: The Animation.

== Musical style and influences ==
Furui cites her experiences growing up listening to R&B and soul, as well as her time as a gospel music singer, as inspirations in her career. Her songs also have gospel music influences. Early on, she mainly covered songs by artists such as Mariah Carey and Minnie Riperton, before starting to write her own songs.

Two of her songs, her debut song "Believe" and the track "Kirai" (嫌い, lit. '[I] hate [you]') from her debut album Green Light were inspired by her time studying English in Toronto; "Kirai" was the first song she wrote after returning from Canada, although was not released until 2021. Both songs were influenced by her negative experiences, particularly her prior difficulty in acknowledging her weaknesses, only to realize them after living through a difficult period.

The song "Rebirth" was written during a low point in her life when she had experienced a breakup and felt that she had little worth and her music career was failing. She wrote the song as a way to help her feel good about herself, almost in an act of desperation. At the time she wrote the song, she had few listeners, but its popularity allowed her to gain a larger fanbase; she cites the song as a turning point in her career. "Hello", her first anime song, was written with the intention of cheering up listeners, as well as conveying a theme of living life positively despite life's anxieties. The song was born from the keywords "fun" and "cute", and ultimately, the phrase "a sense of nostalgia that reminds you of childhood." During discussions with the anime's production team, Furui was also given a few key ideas—they wanted a song "people of all ages could sing" with "easy-to-understand lyrics", and something "evergreen".

== Discography ==
=== Albums ===
List of albums with selected details, chart positions, and sales
Title	Details	Peak chart positions	Sales
Title	Details	JPN	Sales
Green Light	Released: March 9, 2022; Label: Loa Music; Formats: Digital download	—	—
Love One Another	Released: April 3, 2024; Label: Pony Canyon; Formats: Digital download	41	—
Letters	Released: March 4, 2026; Label: Pony Canyon; Formats: CD, digital download	35	JPN: 1,000
"—" denotes releases that did not chart or were not released in that region.

=== Singles ===
List of singles with selected chart positions, year released, and album name
Title	Year	Peak chart positions	Sales	Album
Title	Year	JPN	Sales	Album
"Rebirth"	2019	—	—	Green Light
"I'm Free"	2020	—	—	Green Light
"Kirai"	2021	—	—	Green Light
"Purpose"	2021	—	—	Green Light
"Dekoboko"	2021	—	—	Green Light
"Sins"	2021	—	—	Green Light
"We Are"	2022	—	—	Love One Another
"Usomohonto"	2022	—	—	Love One Another
"Pinku no Kami"	2023	—	—	Love One Another
"Super Star"	2023	—	—	Love One Another
"Psycho"	2023	—	—	Love One Another
"Loa"	2023	—	—	Love One Another
"Friends"	2024	—	—	Love One Another
"Sapporo Tokyo"	2024	—	—	Love One Another
"Ienai Wa"	2024	—	—	TBD
"Tomorrow"	2024	—	—	TBD
"Monster"	2025	—	—	TBD
"Hello"	2025	45	—	TBD
"—" denotes releases that did not chart or were not released in that region.
