= Keiichi Arawi =

Japanese manga artist

Keiichi Arawi あらゐけいいち
- Born: December 29, 1977 (age 48) Gunma Prefecture, Japan
- Area: Manga artist
- Notable works: Nichijou, City

YouTube information
- Channel: あらゐけいいち
- Years active: 2010–2021
- Subscribers: 227 thousand
- Views: 10.21 million

Keiichi Arawi (Japanese: あらゐけいいち, Hepburn: Arai Keiichi; born December 29, 1977) is a Japanese manga artist. After publishing his debut work in early 2006, he launched Nichijou in the latter half of the year. Following its conclusion, he launched City. Nichijou resumed serialization in 2021.

== Biography ==
Keiichi Arawi was born on December 29, 1977, in Gunma Prefecture. In 2006, he made his debut with Kazemachi published in Monthly Comic Flapper. Later that year, he launched Nichijou in Monthly Shōnen Ace. It ran until December 2015. In 2011, Nichijou ranked in the top 50 best selling manga in Japan. In 2015, the series ranked sixth for the Sugoi Japan Award in the manga category. An anime television series adaptation of the series was also produced. In 2013, while Nichijou was serializing, Arawi launched a manga, titled Heaven, in Newtype.

Following Nichijou's completion, Arawi launched City in Morning magazine in September 2016. The series concluded in February 2021. City was chosen by Rob McMonigal as the best continuing series for grown-ups at San Diego Comic-Con in 2019. In 2020, Arawi started posting animated shorts on his YouTube channel. He performed all the voice acting.

== Works ==
- Kazemachi (カゼマチ) (2006) (serialized in Monthly Comic Flapper)
- Nichijou (日常, Nichijō) (2006–present) (serialized in Monthly Shōnen Ace)
- Angle of Happiness (幸せの角度) (2010) (serialized in Dengeki Daioh Genesis)
- Helvetica Standard (2011–present) (serialized in Newtype)
- Heaven (天国) (2013) (serialized in Newtype)
- City (2016–2025) (serialized in Morning)
- Amemiya-san (雨宮さん) (2021–present) (serialized in Monthly Shōnen Sunday)
