= Sayaka Sasaki =

Japanese musician

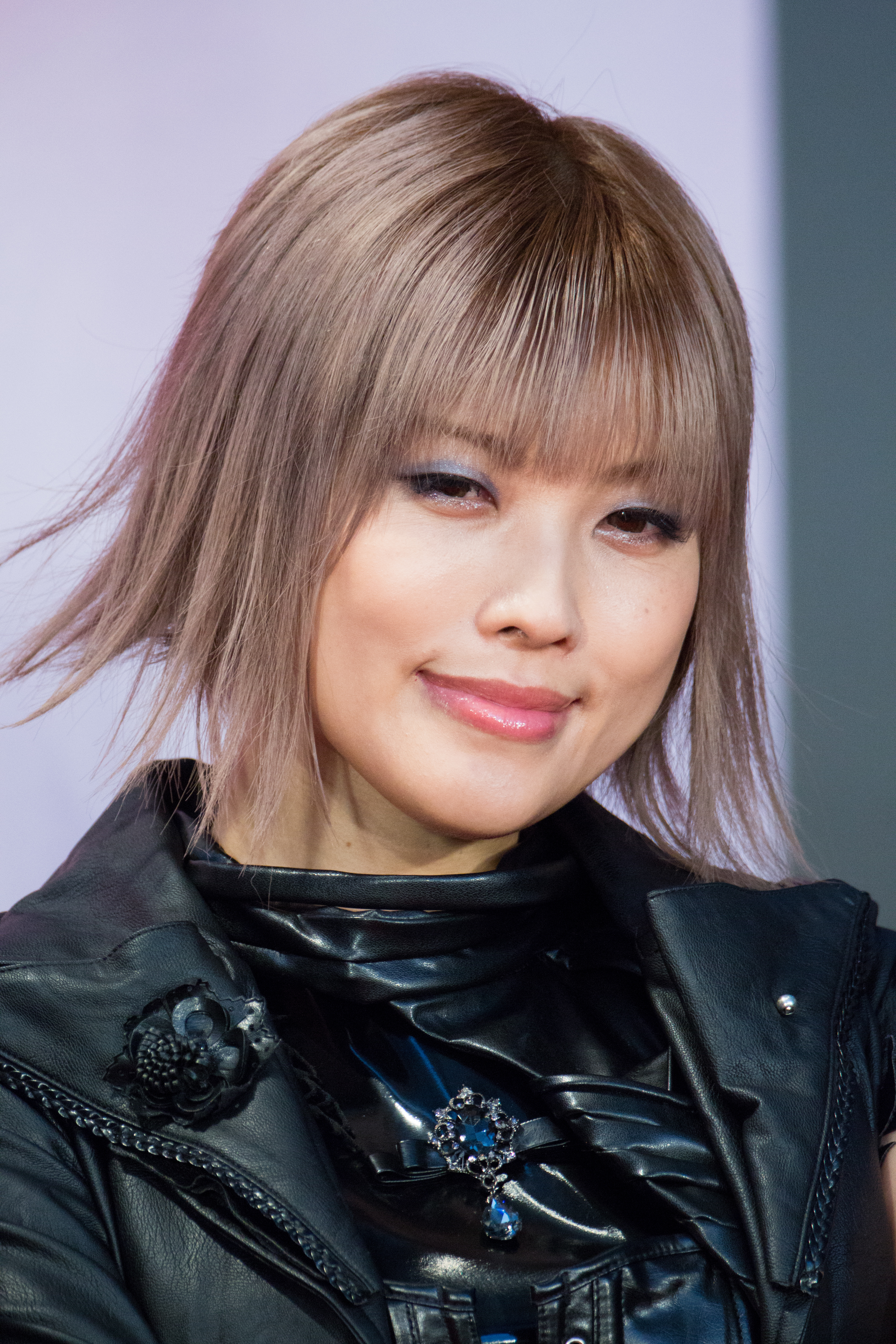
- Sasaki at the Tokyo International Film Festival in October 2017

Background information
- Also known as: Saya-nee (さや姉)
- Born: June 19, 1982 (age 44); Akita City, Akita, Japan
- Occupations: Singer; songwriter; lyricist; voice actress
- Spouse: Sanshiro Wada (m. 2017)
- Musical career
- Origin: Tokyo, Japan
- Genres: J-pop
- Instruments: Vocals; piano
- Years active: 2009–present
- Label: Lantis
- Website: 佐咲紗花 Official Website

Japanese name
- Kanji: 佐咲紗花
- Hiragana: ささき さやか
Transcriptions
- Romanization: Sasaki Sayaka

Signature
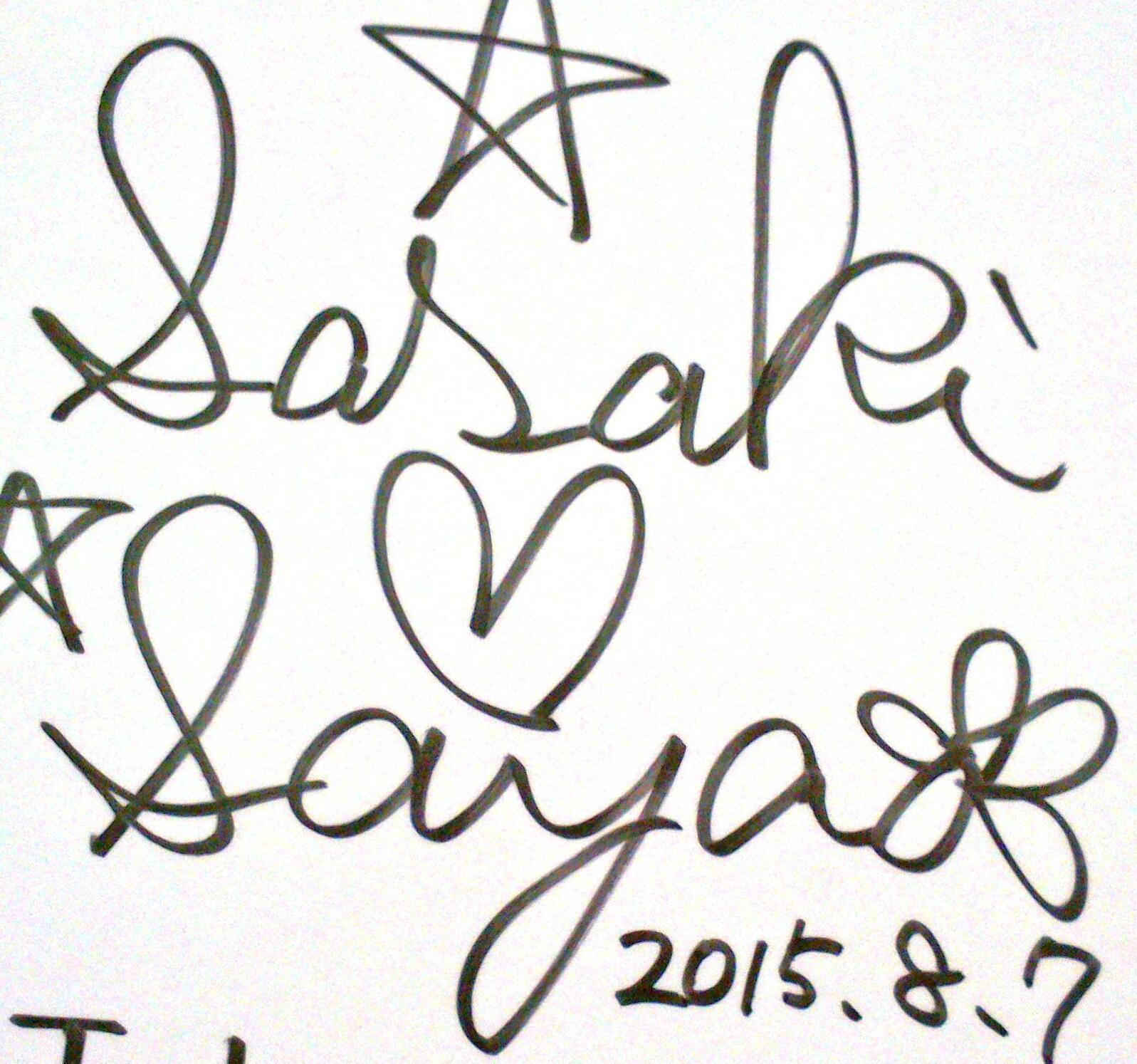

Sayaka Sasaki (佐咲 紗花) (born June 19, 1982) is a Japanese musician signed to Lantis. She started her music career after winning the All-Japan Anison Grand Prix singing contest in 2009. Since then, Sasaki has performed theme songs for various anime television series, such as The Book of Bantorra, Nichijou, Garo: The Animation, So, I Can't Play H!, and Bakuon!!, among others.

== Career ==
Sasaki is a native of Akita, a city in Akita Prefecture. Sasaki participated in three auditions while in high school. She had her break in 2009 when she won the All-Japan Anison Grand Prix singing contest in 2009, beating several thousand participants. She later signed with the musical label Lantis, and in January 2010 released her first single "Seisai no Ripieno" (星彩のRipieno), which was used as the second opening theme to the 2010 animated television series The Book of Bantorra. Her next two singles, "Lucky Racer/Real Star" (released in June 2010) and "Fly away t.p.s" (released in February 2011) were used as the theme songs of the Japanese variety show Lucky Racer. Her single "Zzz", released in May 2011, was used as the first ending theme to the 2011 animated television series Nichijou.

== Personal life ==
She is close friends with former idol Kana Seguchi, a finalist of the 3rd All Japan Anisong Grand Prix, and they call each other "Saya-nee" and "Ramitan".

In November 2017, Sasaki married actor Sanshiro Wada.

== Discography ==
- Sympathetic World (2011)
- Daybreaker (2013)
- Sayakaver. (2015)
- Atlantico Blue (2015)
- Fated Crown (2017)
