= Riho Lahi =

Estonian writer, journalist and cartoonist

Riho Lahi (27 October 1904 – 23 April 1995) was an Estonian writer, journalist and cartoonist, probably best known by his fictional character Kihva Värdi.

Lahi was born Richard-Heinrich Lahi in Võhma, Viljandi County.

== Kihva Värdi ==
Kihva Värdi, supposedly born Ferdinand Kihv, was a well-known Estonian fictional character developed by Lahi. Kihva Värdi has been cited as a possible inspiration for the later fictional character of similar genre, Kärna Ärni. The character, active in the early decades of Soviet occupation of Estonia, regularly "wrote" editorials in a number of Estonian newspapers, commenting, in a humorous and censorship-tolerated way, on current political issues. His editorials have also been published in book form.

Värdi practiced a characteristic, well-recognisable in his era, writing style most prominent for consistently neglecting to join compound words, which are rather frequent in Estonian. This and other stylistic cues paint him as middle-aged and poorly educated (or, as presented by Soviet authorities, "proletarian") man. This aura of proletarianism afforded Lahi some extra leeway in maneuvering through Soviet censorship.

== See also ==
- Kärna Ärni
