= Riho Kuld =

Estonian rower and sculptor

Riho Kuld (born 10 May 1936 in Tallinn) is an Estonian sculptor and rower.

In 1962 he graduated from Tallinn State Applied Art Institute and worked at the institution as a lecturer from 1962 until 1967.

From 1956 until 1959, he became seven-times Estonian champion in different rowing disciplines.

Since 1967 he is a freelance sculptor. He has created the monument of Hubert Pärnakivi in Viljandi. He has also created other sport-related sculptors.

Awards:

- 1981: Meritorious Artist of the Estonian SSR
