= Peacock Theater =

Music and theater venue in Los Angeles, California, US

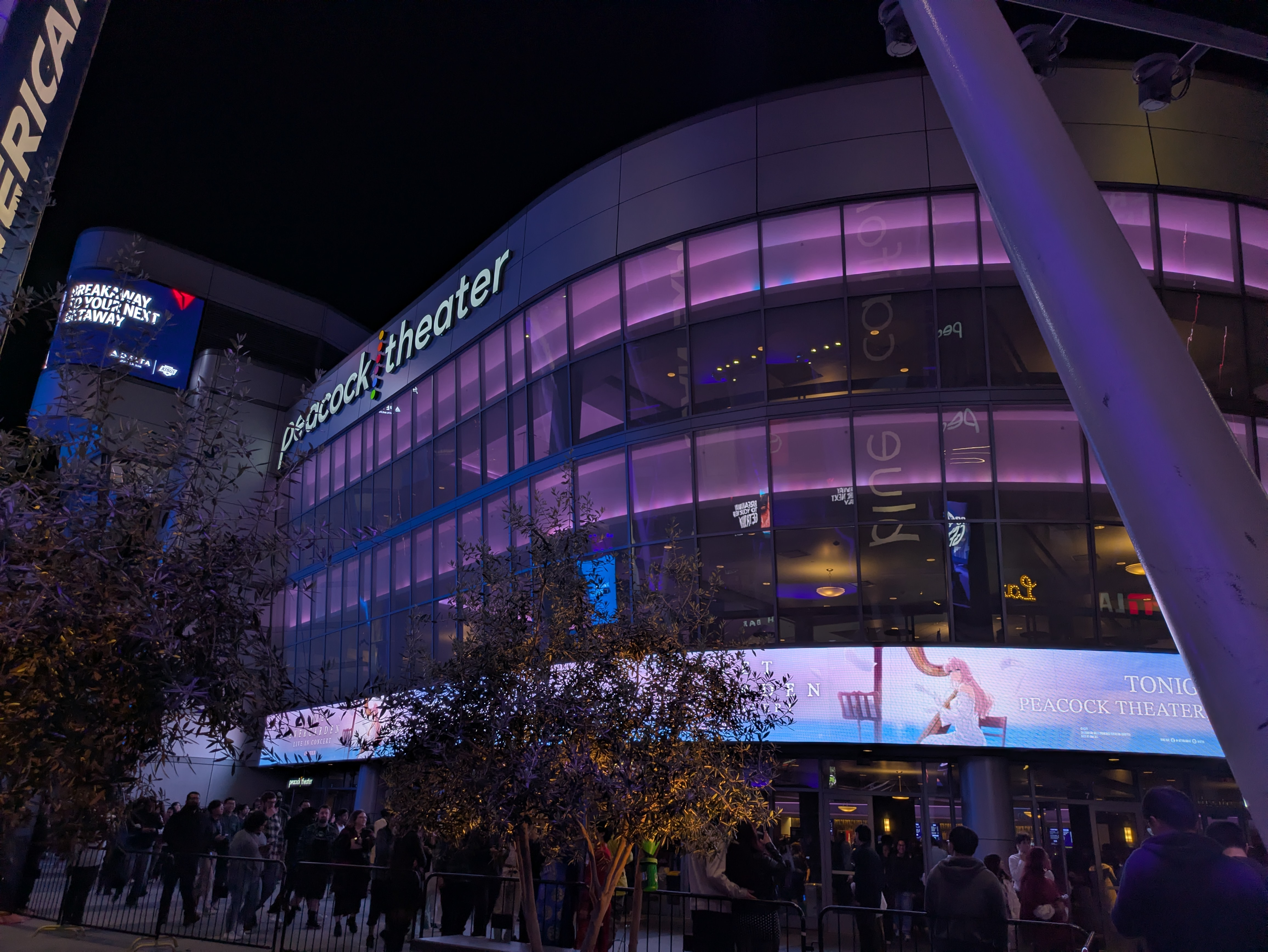
- Exterior of venue in February 2026
- Former names: Nokia Theatre (2007–2015); Microsoft Theater (2015–2023)
- Address: 777 Chick Hearn Court
- Location: Los Angeles, California, U.S.
- Coordinates: 34°02′40″N 118°16′03″W
- Owner: Anschutz Entertainment Group
- Operator: AEG Presents
- Capacity: 7,100
- Public transit: Pico

Construction
- Groundbreaking: September 15, 2005
- Opened: October 17, 2007 (19 years ago)
- Renovated: June 7, 2015 (11 years ago)
- Cost: $120 million ($198 million in 2025 dollars)
- Architect: ELS Architecture
- Structural engineers: John A. Martin & Associates
- General contractor: Clark Construction

Website
- peacocktheater.com

The Peacock Theater, formerly Nokia Theatre and Microsoft Theater, is a music and theater venue at L.A. Live in the downtown core of Los Angeles, California, United States. The theater auditorium seats 7,100 and holds one of the largest indoor stages in the United States; it is best known for hosting various award shows and other special events.

== History ==
The theatre was designed by ELS Architecture and Urban Design of Berkeley, California, on a commission by the Anschutz Entertainment Group (AEG) in 2002. It opened on October 18, 2007, with six concerts featuring the Eagles and the Dixie Chicks. On June 7, 2015, the Nokia Theatre was re-branded as Microsoft Theater as part of a new naming rights deal with AEG Live following Microsoft's acquisition of Nokia's mobile device business in 2014. As part of the new naming rights deal, the L.A. Live plaza was also renamed Microsoft Square (later known as Xbox Plaza) and Microsoft provided upgrades to the venue's technology.

On June 15, 2023, it was announced that the theater would be rebranded as Peacock Theater on July 11 as part of a new naming rights deal between AEG Live and Peacock's parent company Comcast, with Xbox Plaza also rebranded as Peacock Place.

=== Naming history ===
- Nokia Theatre (October 17, 2007 – June 6, 2015)
- Microsoft Theater (June 7, 2015 – July 10, 2023)
- Peacock Theater (July 11, 2023–present)

== Awards shows ==
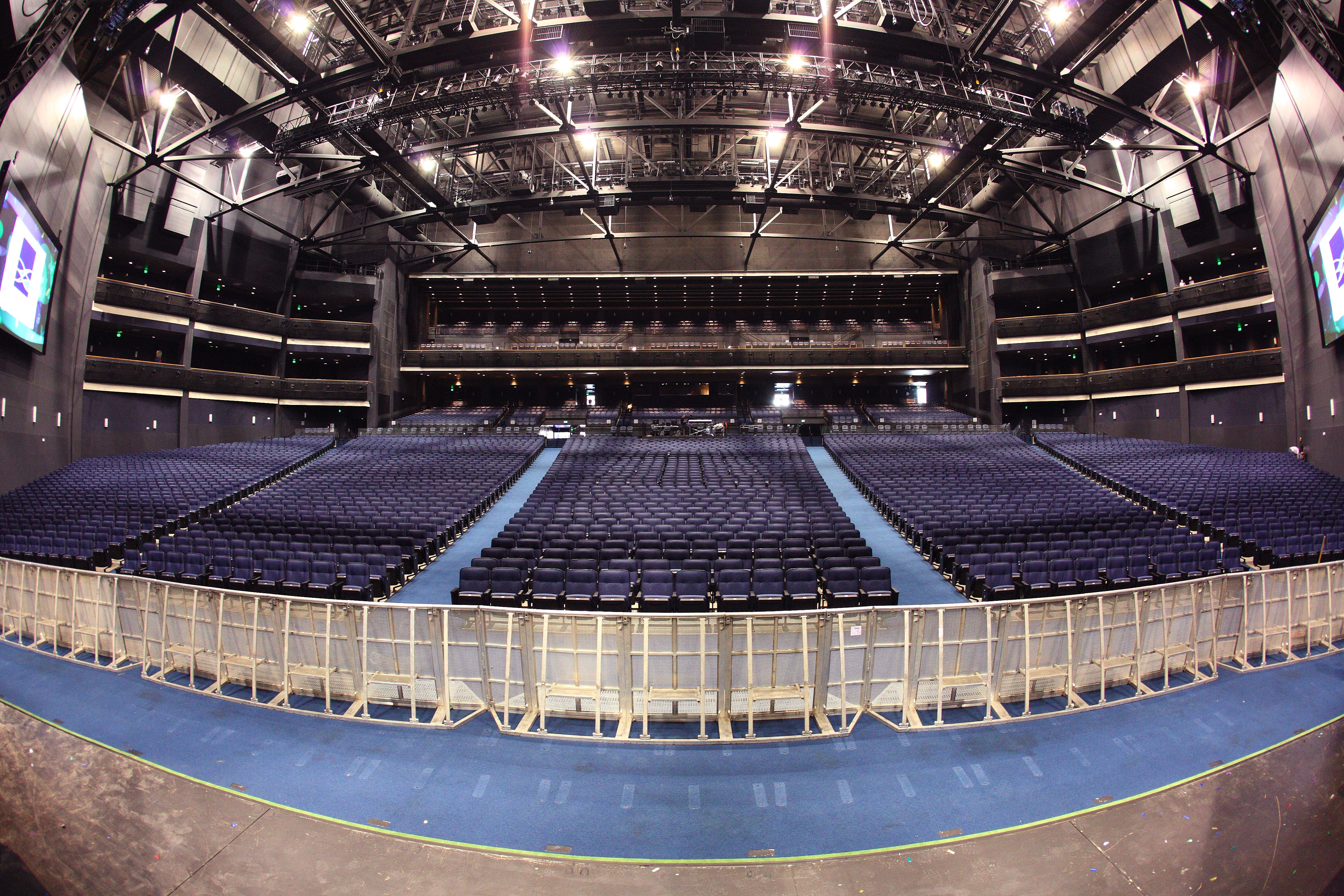
Interior view from the stage in October 2007

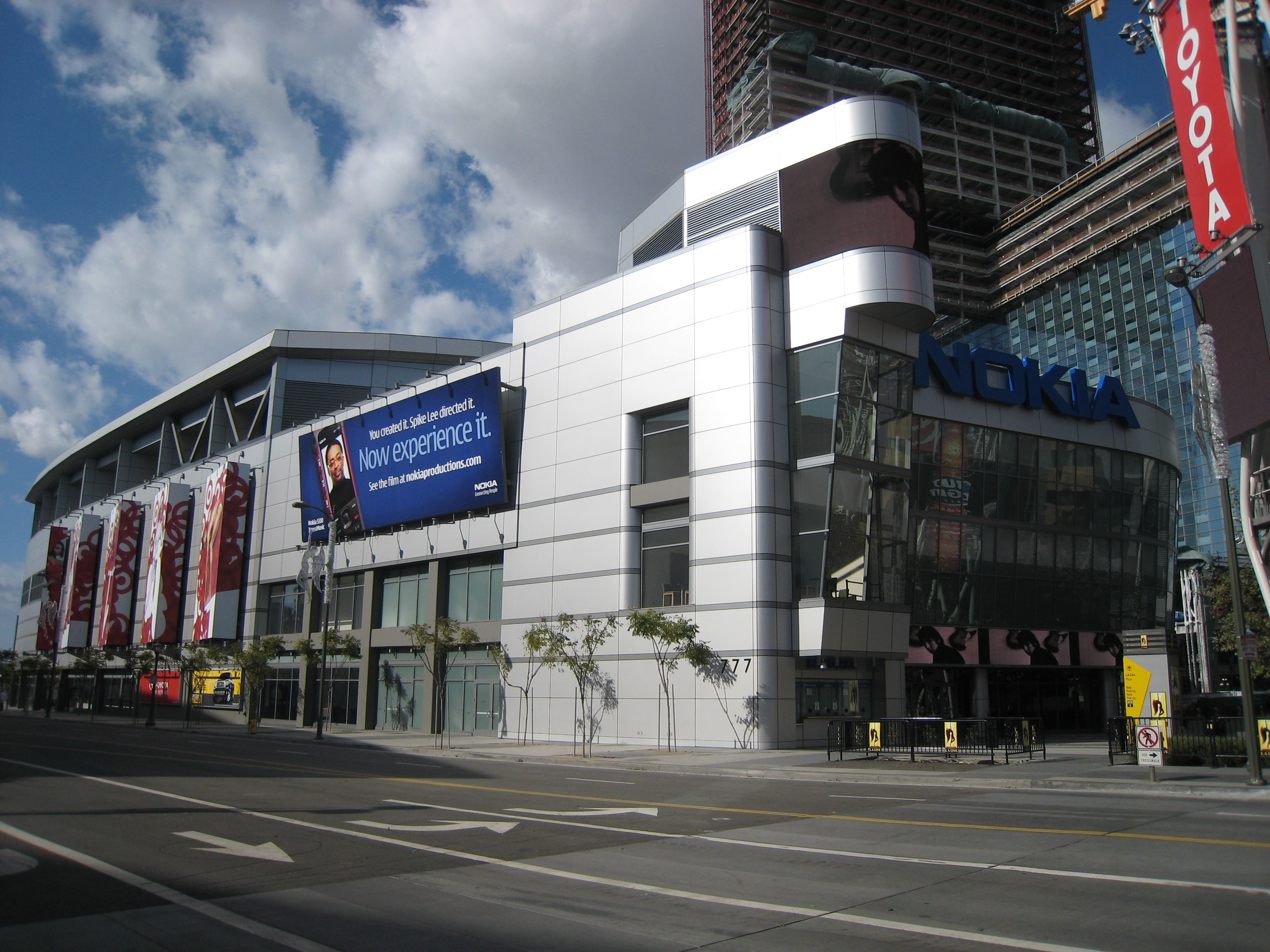
Nokia Theatre in 2008

Since its opening in 2007, the venue has become the venue of multiple entertainment industry awards shows, most notably the Primetime Emmy Awards.

=== Primetime Emmy Awards ===
Since 2008, the theater has been the venue of the annual Primetime Emmy Awards ceremony after it moved from the Shrine Auditorium (excluding 2020 and 2021 due to the COVID-19 pandemic in California, when it was held at the Crypto.com Arena and the Event Deck at L.A. Live, respectively). The Primetime Creative Arts Emmy Awards, which take place a week prior are also held at the venue. Following the Emmys telecast, the Governors Ball is held across the street at the Los Angeles Convention Center. The Emmys will continue to be held here through 2026.

=== Academy Awards ===
In March 2026, it was announced that the Academy Awards will move to the venue from the Dolby Theatre, beginning in 2029, and is expected to continue through 2039.

=== Grammy Awards ===
In 2008 and 2011, the venue hosted The Grammy Nominations Live, a concert announcing the nominees for the Grammy Awards. The Awards take place across the street at the Crypto.com Arena, while the Premier Ceremony (also referred to as the "pre-telecast" ceremony) is held here. Approximately 70 categories are awarded.

=== American Music Awards ===
From 2007 until 2022, the American Music Awards were held here, moving from the Shrine Auditorium.

=== The Game Awards ===
Since 2015 (excluding 2020 where it held virtually due to the COVID-19 pandemic), the theater has hosted The Game Awards, presented by Geoff Keighley.

=== BET Awards ===
The venue has hosted the BET Awards since 2013 (excluding 2020 when it was held virtually due to the COVID-19 pandemic).

=== ESPY Awards ===
The venue hosted the ESPY Awards from 2008 to 2019.

=== People's Choice Awards ===
The venue has hosted the People's Choice Awards from 2010 to 2017.

=== MTV Video Music Awards ===
The venue hosted the MTV Video Music Awards in 2010, 2011, 2015, and 2026.

=== Radio Disney Music Awards ===
The venue hosted the Radio Disney Music Awards from 2013 to 2017.

=== MTV Movie Awards ===
The venue hosted the MTV Movie Awards in 2014 and 2015.

=== iHeartRadio Music Awards ===
The venue hosted the iHeartRadio Music Awards in 2019.

=== Billboard Music Awards ===
The venue hosted the Billboard Music Awards in 2021.

=== Nickelodeon Kids' Choice Awards ===
The venue hosted the Nickelodeon Kids' Choice Awards in 2023.

== Sports ==
The venue has also served as a sports venue. It has hosted boxing matches and will also serve as a venue during the 2028 Olympics. It will host the 2025 NHL entry draft.

=== Boxing ===
The venue has hosted professional boxing matches for circuits such as Golden Boy Promotions and Premier Boxing Champions.

=== 2025 NHL entry draft ===
The venue hosted the 2025 NHL entry draft on June 27 and 28 for the National Hockey League.

=== 2028 Summer Olympics and Paralympics ===
The venue is set to host weightlifting and boxing prelims at the 2028 Summer Olympics.

During the 2028 Summer Paralympics, the venue will host goalball and para powerlifting.

== Other events ==
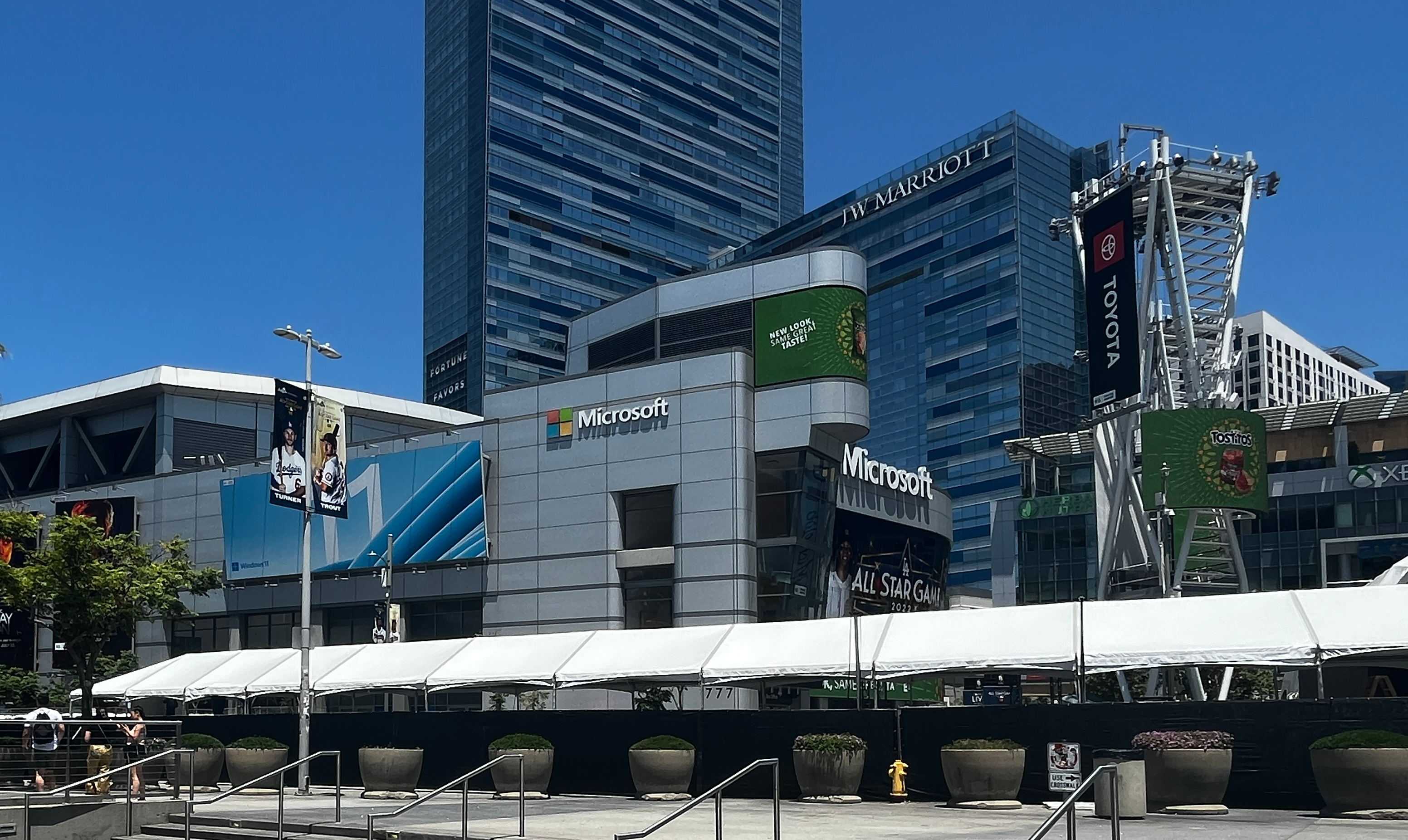
Exterior of the theater in July 2022, under the previous Microsoft Theater branding.

The theater was used by Microsoft and Nintendo multiple times for press conferences during the E3 trade event.

John Mayer played a concert at the theater on December 8, 2007, for the first revue of his Annual John Mayer Holiday Charity Revue, consisting of three separate performances: the first an acoustic set opened by Mayer and joined by the guitarists from his band, the second with the John Mayer Trio, and the third with Mayer's regular touring band. This was recorded and released as the live album/concert film Where the Light Is.

It was also the venue for the finale of American Idol from 2008 to 2014.

Vocaloid character Hatsune Miku made her U.S. debut as well as her very first overseas concert at the theater on July 2, 2011 called "Mikunopolis" as part of Anime Expo2011. She returned to the venue on October 11–12, 2014, as part of Miku Expo LA 2014. Both concerts were sold out. Miku returned for another performance on May 6, 2016, as part of Miku Expo North America 2016. She once again returned as part of her 2018 USA & Mexico edition on June 29, 2018. She was also planned to return in 2020 for Miku Expo 2020 USA & Canada before getting cancelled due to the COVID-19 pandemic, she then returned in 2024 and 2026 for the Miku Expo North America of those years

The live adaption of the children's television series Yo Gabba Gabba! called Yo Gabba Gabba! LIVE! There's a Party in My City! was held at theatre in 2011.

2NE1 held a show at this venue as part of their 1st World Tour [New Evolution Global Tour] on August 24, 2012.

The 28th Annual Rock and Roll Hall of Fame inductions were held at the venue on April 18, 2013. The ceremony was held here again in 2022. The 40th Annual inductions happened here in 2025.

The inauguration ceremony for the 9th Summit of the Americas was held at the theater for world leaders and President Joe Biden in 2022.

On December 11, 2022, the venue hosted the inauguration for Mayor Karen Bass.

Hong Kong boy group Mirror performed their second U.S. concert on April 9, 2024, as part of their first tour, Feel the Passion Concert Tour 2024.

On June 15, 2024, the Peacock Theater hosted a unique fundraiser supporting the Joe Biden for President Campaign. It hosted an interview with President Joe Biden and President Barack Obama being conducted by Jimmy Kimmel. George Clooney and Julia Roberts were also hosts.

Philippine girl group BINI held a concert on June 14, 2025, in the area as part of the Biniverse World Tour. They returned for their second concert at the venue on August 5, 2026 as part of their Signals World Tour.

A concert dedicated to showcasing music from the Violet Evergarden franchise was hosted at the Peacock Theater on February 15, 2026, with Miho Karasawa, Minori Chihara, and Aira Yuki present to perform their songs from the franchise.

A concert dedicated to Umamusume: Pretty Derby was announced on June 21, 2026 to be hosted at the Peacock Theater between October 22nd and 23rd as part of their Umamusume – 7th Event World Tour: The Stage!, featuring 17 voice actors that work in the franchise.

Events and tenants
Preceded by Shrine Auditorium	Venues of the Primetime Emmy Awards; 2008–present	Succeeded by –
Preceded by Shrine Auditorium	Venues of the American Music Awards; 2007–present	Succeeded by –
Preceded by Kodak Theatre	Venues of the ESPY Awards; 2008–present	Succeeded by –
Preceded by Kodak Theatre	Venues of the American Idol Finale; 2008–2014	Succeeded by Dolby Theatre
Preceded by Radio City Music Hall	Venues of the MTV Video Music Awards; 2010–2011	Succeeded by Staples Center
Preceded by The Forum	Venues of the MTV Video Music Awards; 2015	Succeeded by Madison Square Garden
Preceded by Shrine Auditorium	Venues of the People's Choice Awards; 2010–2017	Succeeded by Barker Hangar
Preceded by Radio Disney Studios	Venues of the Radio Disney Music Awards; 2013–2017	Succeeded by Dolby Theatre
Preceded by Shrine Auditorium	Venues of the BET Awards; 2013–present	Succeeded by –
Preceded by The AXIS	Venues of The Game Awards; 2015–present	Succeeded by –
Preceded by Blizzard Arena	Home of the Los Angeles Valiant; 2020–future	Succeeded by –
