= List of Undefeated Bahamut Chronicle episodes =

Cover of the first Blu-ray release featuring Lisesharte Atismata

Undefeated Bahamut Chronicle is an anime series adapted from the light novel series of the same title, written by Senri Akatsuki and illustrated by Ayumu Kasuga. Masaomi Andō directed the series at Lerche. Yuuko Kakihara handled the series composition, while Keiko Kurosawa designed the characters. The series aired from January 11 to March 28, 2016. The opening theme is "Hiryō no Kishi" (飛竜の騎士, lit. Wyvern Knight) by True, while the ending theme is "Lime Tree" (ライムツリー) by Nano Ripe. It was streamed on Hulu.

The anime has been licensed by Sentai Filmworks, Madman Entertainment and MVM Films in the United States, Australia and the United Kingdom, respectively.

== Episodes ==
| No. | Title (Note: All English titles are taken from Hidive.) | Original release date |
|---|---|---|
| 1 | "The Crimson War Princess"; Transliteration: "Shu no Senhime" (Japanese: 朱の戦姫) | January 11, 2016 |
5 years ago the Arcadia Empire is overthrown in a Coup d'état when a lone warrior, using a black Drag-Ride, destroys 1200 of the Empire's Drag-Riders and became known as the Black Hero. In the present, Lux Arcadia, ex-Prince of the Empire now working as a handyman, falls through the roof of the Royal Knights Academy bathroom onto Princess Lisesharte "Lishe" Atismata of the Atismatan Kingdom and sees a brand on her stomach. She challenges him to a duel despite Lux being undefeated in battle. Lux meets his sister, ex-Princess Airi Arcadia, who demands he win the duel. As former royalty they have to pay a massive fine to the current royal family, and if Lux goes to prison, Airi will have to pay the fine herself. During the duel Lux' white sword and white Drag-Ride are damaged. He insists on continuing with his broken sword, refusing to use his black sword. A cloaked person uses a horn whistle to summon an Abyss dragon. Lux allows himself to be injured, giving Lishe the time to destroy the Abyss. Lishe falls in love with Lux as he is the first man to try protect her. She asks him to keep her brand a secret, as it is the crest of the former Arcadia Empire. Lux is made an official academy student.
| 2 | "The Weakest Drag-Knight"; Transliteration: "Saijaku no Kiryū Tsukai" (Japanese: 最弱の機竜使い) | January 18, 2016 |
Lux meets his childhood friend Philuffy "Phi" Aingram, the Headmistress's sister, making Lishe jealous. When the female students learn Lux is a handyman they swamp him with requests, including Krulcifer Einfolk who wants him to find the Black Hero. Lux later wakes up to Phi in his bed, claiming she is his roommate. Lishe repairs Lux's broken white sword before explaining that as her father had been leader of the coup d'état she was kidnapped and branded as proof she was the Empire's property. When the Black Hero won the war Lishe replaced her dead father as Princess of Atismata and her brand was kept secret. An Abyss appears and Lishe takes a team to kill it. The Abyss is being controlled with the horn whistle by Ragreed Forus, a former Knight still loyal to the Arcadia Empire. He overwhelms Lishe and reminds her he was the one who branded her. Lux arrives and unsheathes his black sword, transforming into a black Drag-Ride, revealing himself as the Black Hero. He easily destroys the Abyss and kills Ragreed with his ability "Reload On Fire". Airi laments her brother is not a hero, he is the "Weakest Undefeated" who betrayed his own Empire.
| 3 | "The Lady of the North's Engagement Conditions"; Transliteration: "Kita no Reijō no Kon'yaku Jijō" (Japanese: 北の令嬢の婚約事情) | January 25, 2016 |
Lux is hailed as a hero. Lishe agrees to keep his identity as the Black Hero a secret. Relie sets up a game where the girl who steals a red request paper from Lux within one hour will get him as her servant for a week. Lux is caught by Lishe but he escapes. He is then captured by Phi but also tricks her into letting him go. With only ten minutes left he is trapped in a changing room when several girls including Krulcifer enter and strip to their underwear. He is spotted by Krulcifer who lets him remain hidden. Claiming the game is over she asks to see the red paper and he hands it over just as the bell sounds, signalling the real end of the game with Krulcifer the winner. Relie believes the horn whistle used by Ragreed is the key to a secret in the ancient ruins and asks Lux to go there. Airi warns Lux to be careful with Krulcifer as she is a noble of the Ymir Theocracy and is expected to marry another noble and will soon meet her future fiancé. Wanting to avoid this she asks Lux to pose as her boyfriend, making Lishe jealous. Krulcifer and Lux are attacked by thieves during their date. Krulcifer uses her ability to see into the future, and defeats them. They meet Alterize, Krulcifer's female butler, who is shocked Krulcifer has a boyfriend. Later they meet the arrogant Lord Kreutzer Balzeride, Krulcifer's fiancé. Krulcifer claims Lux is her boyfriend. Outraged Krulcifer would choose an ex-prince over himself Kreutzer challenges Lux to a duel in 3 days.
| 4 | "The Sixth Ruin -Miniature Garden-"; Transliteration: "Dai Roku Iseki - Hakoniwa -" (Japanese: 第六遺跡 - 箱庭 -) | February 1, 2016 |
Kreutzer discusses the ancient ruins with a hooded man. Lux is exhausted from his handyman job so Tillfur Lilimit, a friend of Lishe, drags him to her room where she, Lishe and Phi help him relax. The four noble families discuss the Ragnarok's, immensely powerful Abyss dragons imprisoned beneath ancient ruin across the country. One such Ragnarok may soon escape and the Kingdom does not have the military power to stop it. Kreutzer is tasked with entering the ruins to find powerful weapons. Relie gathers Lux and his friends to investigate the ruins. As the Horn Whistle is the key to entering she gives it to Lux. Krulcifer goes with them, though she admits she has her own reasons. Phi gets into the bath with a flustered Lux who notices an old scar on her back has disappeared. Kreutzer reveals he will be joining Lux and his team, angering Krulcifer. At the ruins, the team is attacked by a Diablos level Abyss. The Abyss almost breaks Lux's white sword before Krulcifer shoots it. Kreutzer announces that if Lux defeats the Abyss before he does he will call off their duel. Krulcifer shoots at the Abyss but has lost her ability to see the future. Kreutzer succeeds in killing the Abyss first. Lux and Krulcifer head for the altar at the centre of the ruins. Krulcifer believes that the Black Hero is capable of piloting his Drag-Ride indefinitely, whereas most people would eventually run out of power. She hopes to find that the Black Hero is the same as she is. They arrive at the altar but before Lux can unlock it with the whistle it unlocks automatically for Krulcifer, who reveals she is really a surviving citizen of the ancient ruins.
| 5 | "The Girl's Wish"; Transliteration: "Shōjo no Negai" (Japanese: 少女の願い) | February 8, 2016 |
Lux and Krulcifer become trapped by rubble. Krulcifer explains she was found as a baby by the Earl of the Ymir Theocracy who thought she might be valuable. Krulcifer worked hard to become a Drag-Knight, making her adopted siblings jealous. She came to the ruins to prove she was human, but now accepts she is not. Lux reveals he, his mother and sister were banished from the royal family and when Lux's mother was injured the citizens who suffered under the Empire let her die. Lisha appears and free them. Lux hides the truth about Krulcifer, claiming the Horn Whistle is not a key to the lower levels. Krulcifer has Airi drug Lux and attends the duel in his place. Krulcifer loses her future seeing ability and is defeated. Kreutzer admits he knows Krulcifer is a citizen of the ruins and plans on using her to access and use the advanced technology to destroy the Ragnaroks, reasoning that sacrificing Krulcifer is a small price to pay. Lux attacks Kreutzer, revealing his Black Hero form to Krulcifer. When Kreutzer uses Krulcifer's future seeing ability Lux realizes Kreutzer's ability allows him to steal the abilities of others. Kreutzer attempts to shoot Krulcifer as a plot to steal Lux' super speed but on seeing Krulcifer cry Lux states it is his duty to protect his 'girlfriend' and activates a secret ability he designed himself, Recoil Burst, that focuses all his energy into a single attack, defeating Kreutzer. Afterwards, Lux is told that by defeating her previous fiancé he is Krulcifer's new fiancé. Krulcifer admits Lux managed to impress her and kisses him twice in front of a furious Lisha.
| 6 | "The Homecoming of the Strongest"; Transliteration: "Saikyō no Kikan" (Japanese: 最強の帰還) | February 15, 2016 |
Lux is asked to investigate rumors about a suspicious person lurking around the campus. To this end Lux is forced to cross-dress to avoid suspicion. During his rounds, he sees a girl talking to a cat just as he is assaulted by the suspicious prowler. He is saved by the girl who introduces herself as Celestia "Celes" Ralgris, a daughter of a high ranking noble, strongest third year student of the academy and a known man hater. Lux claims he is a girl called Luno. Kreutzer is murdered in prison by his hooded partner. Later, Lux, as himself, meets Celes, who insists he leave the academy. However, the knowledge of Ragnarok's revival makes Lux oppose her as he believes she cannot defeat it on her own. Relie arranges a formal match in which if Lux wins, he may stay but must leave if Celes wins. The next day, the members of the Chivalric Order, led by Celes, travels to Ries island for a training camp where Lux notices a large building at the top of a mountain. Later that night, Lux is called for a massage request only to learn that the client is Celes and he quickly cross-dresses into Luno before he is seen. Celes invites him to tour the town the next day where she goes shopping for a swimsuit. While resting in the shade outside town, Celes reveals that she, in fact, does not hate men, it was just a misunderstanding that has never been resolved.
| 7 | "A Girl's Truth"; Transliteration: "Shōjo no Shinjitsu" (Japanese: 少女の真実) | February 22, 2016 |
Soldiers locate the fossilized Ragnarok only to find that the husk is empty. The students enjoy free time at the beach. Lux recalls what he and Celes talked about yesterday where she also reveals that she was trained by Lux's maternal grandfather who had died in prison because he spoke out against the Empire's corruption, and she only wants Lux out of the school to protect him. Lux and Celestia's battle finally begins with the latter holding the advantage. As the match goes on, the Triad locate the suspicious prowler from the academy who is revealed to be Saniya who is actually a spy for the Heiburg Republic and has been stealing information from the academy. Saniya admits that her mission is to topple the kingdom just as the revived Ragnarok appears, interrupting Lux and Celes' battle. Celestia appears to defeat it on her own until Kreutzer's mysterious partner appears and revives it using a flute and Saniya attacks Celestia who is shocked at the betrayal. Defeated, Celes tells Lux everything but he reveals that he already knows when he exposes himself as Luno. Equipping Bahamut, Lux attacks and quickly defeats the Ragnarok but its core is saved by Saniya. The hooded figure introduces herself as Hayes of the Heiburg Republic who bears a resemblance to Lux and Airi. She hints to Lux that he had forgotten a tragic incident on the island five years ago and the two flee. Later that night, Celes expresses her anger at being deceived by Lux but she eventually forgives him and allows him to stay at the academy. Lux later tries to remember what took place on the island five years ago and he sees flashes of the large building and a room with young girls on a bed while covered in blood. As he tries to remember more, his head begins to hurt and an earthquake suddenly hits as new ruins appears out from the sea.
| 8 | "Awakening of the Phantom Divine Beast"; Transliteration: "Maboroshi Kamikemono no Mezame" (Japanese: 幻神獣の目覚め) | February 29, 2016 |
A flashback of Philuffy and Lux when they were kids is seen. Lux visits her in her room and she says that she is going to participate in the ruin investigation but Lux expresses his worry over her health though she assures him that she is fine. Lux is inspecting his Bahamut Drag-Ride which has been modified by Lishe in preparation for the ruin investigation. As the investigation begins, Lux and the girls travel inside the ruins and are surprised to find a destroyed ecosystem and suggests that a war took place based on the destruction. The group decides to split up in order to cover more ground. Lux, Noct, and Airi's group discover a young girl covered in rubble. The group calls Krulcifer to check on the girl who awakens at her touch. Krulcifer sees that she is not human and the girl introduces herself as La Krushe, the supervisor of the ruins and she refers to Krulcifer as "Administrator". La Krushe explains that she had lost most of memories and data due to her long slumber and confirms that most of the ruins' functions have been suspended. Meanwhile, the Queen of Atismata and the Four Great Nobles meet and discuss Ragreed's escape and plot to attack the kingdom. However, the army lacks man power due to an insufficient number of Drag-Rides so one of the nobles suggests using the students of the academy to make up for this but Celes' father opposes the idea. The noble also notes that Lux is the only one who could defeat the Ragnarok while admitting his plan to having the former prince work for them in the near future. Back in the ruins, Lux is carrying a tired Phi as they enter a room where the Abyss were being created. Phi suddenly experiences a headache and warns them of incoming danger as an Abyss suddenly appears and attacks them. La Krushe explains that when the ruins enter a state of alert, three Abyss are released to protect it. Lux suggests escaping the ruins but an unusually stern Relie insists on continuing and Phi equips her Drag-Ride and heads off with Lux in pursuit. They leave the ruins and confront the remaining Abyss but Phi is thrown into the old building on the mountain and Lux starts to remember more about the past. He enters the building and remembers that it was once used as a place for human experimentation by the old Empire and Phi was one of the victims. He finds Phi only to be attacked by her as she smiles maniacally and her eyes emit an inhuman glow.
| 9 | "The Promise"; Transliteration: "Yakusoku" (Japanese: 約束) | March 7, 2016 |
A brief flashback sees a young Phi and Lux saying their goodbyes as they separate. In the present, Phi continues to strangle Lux but she suddenly passes out and Hayes appears beside them. Back in the ruins, Lishe and Krulcifer defeat the remaining Abyss. Airi tells them that they had discovered the entrance to the deepest parts of the ruins but they lack a key to enter. Back in the old building, Lux confronts Hayes but she warns him that if she dies, Phi dies too. Hayes explains that she planted a seed of Ragnarok inside Phi and that she is slowly turning into an Abyss as her body is being eaten from the inside. Hayes also reveals that Phi had been resisting her commands which explains her fever and headaches. She then offers Lux a deal in which she will command the Ragnarok to save Phi who will die in a few days in her current state but in exchange, Lux must open the entrance to the deepest part of the ruins using Krulcifer as they key but he is given a time limit of two days to accomplish this. Later, Lux meets with Relie who reveals that Phi supposedly died due to the inhumane experiments conducted on her five years ago but she awoke stronger than before but at a terrible price. Relie also reveals that her determination to explore the deepest areas of the ruins is because she hopes to find something that can cure Phi. The next day, Lux reminisces about his past again while his Bahamut undergoes maintenance. To his and Airi's shock, they are suddenly contacted by their Fugil who explains that the only way to save Phi is to destroy the Ragnarok controlling her and Hayes' horn. Before returning to the ruins, Lux visits Phi who reveals that she knows the truth of her condition but states she is satisfied as both Lux and Relie have grown strong over the years. The group opens the entrance to ruins' deepest area with Krulcifer's help and La Krushe, whose memory has recovered, attacks them as Hayes appears with Phi under her control. Airi, who also possesses a horn, allows Phi to regain control of herself and breaks Hayes' horn in the process but the Ragnarok is revived. Despite their best efforts, the group is overwhelmed until Lux unleashes Bahamut's full power and defeats the Ragnarok. Fugil convinces Hayes to retreat as the ruins begin to collapse and La Krushe loses consciousness. As Lux recovers, he is assured by Phi that she can resist the horn and thanks him for saving her.
| 10 | "The Young Girls' Reward"; Transliteration: "Shōjo-tachi no Hōshū" (Japanese: 少女たちの報酬) | March 14, 2016 |
Everyone celebrates Lux's recovery after returning home from training camp. Airi mentions that the heroines were the ones who took care of Lux although they would argue who would do the task. Relie reveals that she was berated for her act of investigating the ruins without permission but she explains that she got off lightly due to the Kingdom's Foundation Festival taking place soon. Forced into a corner, Lux divides his time between the girls starting with Airi. While they walk around the city, Airi explains that a Drag-Ride tournament will take place during the festival. She also warns him that the "Empire's Assassin Blade", the strongest Drag-Knight serving under the Emperor, has escaped from prison and that Lux is their target as he destroyed the empire. They later separate and Lux meets up with Celes who had dressed formally for the occasion. Lux, on the other hand, is made to wear a butler uniform to avoid being recognized by the other students and they happily roam the city. After their date, Lux, now dressed formally, is then taken by the Triad to Krulcifer for his next date which is a social gathering. After a dance, they step out into a balcony where Krulcifer kisses Lux again and reveals that her maid, Alterize, also attended the gathering to monitor them. Lux is then taken to Phi and they spend their date in a church where Lux rests on her lap while she once again thanks him for saving her as Relie happily watches them with the Triad nearby. As Lux returns to the school, he met by Lisha who requests him to be her knight and that she would like to present him as such to the public when she makes her speech at the festival's end but Lux says that he will think about it. The next day, as Lux and Airi are talking alone, they are met by the aforementioned escapee who introduces herself as Yoruka Kirihime who calls Lux her master due to a contract she made with his father years ago and is willing to do whatever he says. Shocked by this, Lux has her wait until the festival ends so that he can speak with her properly. Later that night, while Lux is bathing, Yoruka joins him causing him to scream in surprise and they are discovered by the Triad and an angry Lisha. After bathing and calming everyone down, Lux questions Yoruka about her intentions. She does not answer and instead asks Lux how long he intends to deceive everyone as he is more than capable of destroying the New Kingdom and re-establishing the Empire but Lux replies that he does not desire to. Yoruka is then attacked by the girls but she fights back with her own Divine Drag-Ride and eventually flees while Saniya, Ragreed and Hayes, who were the ones that freed Yoruka, watch from afar.
| 11 | "The Imperial Assassin's Dagger"; Transliteration: "Teikoku no Kyōjin" (Japanese: 帝国の凶刃) | March 21, 2016 |
Lisha is practicing her speech for the festival as Lux enters her room and they discuss Lisha's offer from the other day. Meanwhile, Hayes, Saniya and Yoruka are inside another ruin which they activate. Lux and Airi are then summoned by the nobles to discuss a plot by Ragreed to overthrow the New Kingdom which will take place after the Drag-Ride tournament. Lux is ordered to act as a decoy to lure out over one hundred Abyss that are hiding in uninhabited villages near the Kingdom with the promise of overlooking the Ries Island incident. They also order Lux to win the upcoming tournament and he agrees to do both though Airi is against this. Upon returning to the academy, Lux asks Lisha to once again modify his Wyvern Drag-Ride but he spots Yoruka. He finds her and they talk about her reasons for serving him even though the Empire is no more. She explains that it is due to a promise she made with her deceased younger brother and she makes clear her intention to destroy the New Kingdom and restore the Empire in order to fulfill her contract. When Lux still refuses to destroy the Kingdom, Yoruka declares him her enemy and leaves. During the tournament, Lux wins his match but Krulcifer notices that Lux is rushing his victory unlike his normal strategy. After the match, Lux asks Airi to relay a message to everyone should he not return for the group battle tournament. Later, Lisha's own match begins and things proceed smoothly until Yoruka manipulates Lisha's Drag-Ride and makes it attack the audience. Lisha is then imprisoned and her Drag-Ride is confiscated. Meanwhile, Lux discovers Saniya who unleashes the Abyss which he then lures to the Kingdom's soldiers who destroy them. Keeping her promise to Lux, Airi reveals the operation to the girls who decide to try and find Yoruka and rescue Lisha. As Lux is resting, the insurgents, led by Ragreed, attack and kill the remaining soldiers while the main force retreats. Back in the academy, the girls learn of the insurgents' attack and that they are advancing to the Capital. Lux engages Ragreed who reveals that a giant stone golem, piloted by Hayes, is approaching the Capital and Lux is forced to use Bahamut despite knowing that he can only use it for twelve minutes.
| 12 | "The Young Girl's Cherished Desire"; Transliteration: "Shōjo no Honkai" (Japanese: 少女の本懐) | March 28, 2016 |
Lux continues to battle Ragreed who severs Bahamut's arm only to learn that it was actually a Wyvern disguised as Bahamut. Lux quickly defeats Ragreed and his men and heads for the Capital while making contact with Airi. Meanwhile, Lisha is visited by Saniya who derides her and has one of her soldiers strip Lisha down as she is curious to see the Empire's brand below her stomach but Lux arrives in time to stop them. He convinces a depressed and guilty Lisha to help him fight. Hayes orders the New Kingdom to surrender or die but is attacked and temporarily subdued by Lux, Lisha, Krulcifer and Phi. Lux asks the latter two to destroy the remaining Abyss and insurgents while he and Lisha destroys the giant. They are then met by Hayes in her own Divine Drag-Ride who splits the city in two with a single attack. Meanwhile, Celes confronts Saniya who was threatening the nobles. While Lux looks for a way inside the giant, Lisha fights Hayes alone but is clearly outmatched. As Lux finds an entrance, he is confronted by Yoruka who intends to revive the Empire under Airi instead as Lux still refuses to reconsider her offer. Lux again questions her reasons for reviving the Empire and she finally tells him the full story: Yoruka was a princess while her twin brother was the young ruler of their kingdom after their father died of an illness. In exchange for Yoruka's cooperation with the Empire, her brother would be spared but while she was away, her brother was killed by the nobles of their kingdom as a peace offering when they decided to put the blame on him after they surrendered to the Empire. Yoruka kills the nobles in revenge but decides to honor her contract to the Empire believing it was her fate. Lux, however, compares her to Lisha who is trying her best despite her unwilling position as the Kingdom's princess. They continue to battle and Lux eventually wins by taking advantage of Yoruka's brief distraction when he mentioned her brother in a speech. Lux explains that he wished to change the country for the better but he failed. In order for him to accomplish this, he had to destroy the Empire first and rebuild it from the ground up thus making Yoruka understand that everything Lux had done was for the Empire. Celes defeats Saniya but the giant recovers and prepares to attack the Capital but Yoruka, who decided to serve Lux again, betrays Hayes and destroys the giant's controls at the last second. Infuriated, Hayes tries to destroy the Capital alone but is finally defeated by Lux. At the end of the festival, Lisha makes her speech and announces Lux as her knight to the public who give their approval. During the party, Lux sees Fugil who is holding what appears to be Bahamut's Sword Device then quietly walks away. Lux is then greeted by the girls, including Yoruka, who openly flirts with him and an angry Lisha demands that Lux declares which girl he loves.
