= Violet Evergarden: The Movie =

2020 Japanese animated film by Taichi Ishidate

- Theatrical release poster
- Kanji: 劇場版 ヴァイオレット・エヴァーガーデン
- Revised Hepburn: Gekijōban Vaioretto Evāgāden
- Directed by: Taichi Ishidate
- Screenplay by: Reiko Yoshida
- Based on: Violet Evergarden by Kana Akatsuki
- Produced by: Shinichirō Hatta; Shinichi Nakamura; Kazusa Umeda; Megumi Suzuki; Shigeru Saitō
- Starring: Yui Ishikawa; Daisuke Namikawa
- Cinematography: Kōhei Funamoto
- Edited by: Kengo Shigemura
- Music by: Evan Call
- Production company: Kyoto Animation
- Distributed by: Shochiku
- Release date: September 18, 2020
- Running time: 140 minutes
- Country: Japan
- Language: Japanese
- Box office: US$21.6 million

Violet Evergarden: The Movie (Japanese: 劇場版 ヴァイオレット・エヴァーガーデン, Hepburn: Gekijōban Vaioretto Evāgāden) is a 2020 Japanese animated film based on Violet Evergarden light novel series by Kana Akatsuki and a sequel to the 2018 anime television series adaptation. Produced by Kyoto Animation and distributed by Shochiku, the film is directed by Taichi Ishidate from a script written by Reiko Yoshida, and stars Yui Ishikawa and Daisuke Namikawa who reprise their roles from the series. In the film, Violet Evergarden continues in her search for the meaning of the final words left by Gilbert Bougainvillea when she receives a request to write a letter from a boy named Yuris.

Initially teased in March 2018 as a new project, it was revealed in July to be an anime film. Ishidate and Yoshida were revealed as part of the film's staff in April 2019. The film suffered setbacks following an arson attack at one of Kyoto Animation's studio buildings and the COVID-19 pandemic.

Violet Evergarden: The Movie premiered in Japan on September 18, 2020. The film grossed over $21 million worldwide, and received awards and nominations, including the awards at Tokyo Anime Awards Festival and Japan Media Arts Festival.

== Plot ==
Daisy, the granddaughter of the recently deceased Anne Magnolia, stumbles upon the numerous letters sent to her grandmother during her birthdays. (Note: As depicted in the tenth episode of Violet Evergarden (2018).) She becomes curious about the legend of Violet Evergarden, who is well known for writing beautiful letters on behalf of her customers. More than half a century ago, (Note: Set four years after the events of Violet Evergarden and one year after the events of the second half of Violet Evergarden: Eternity and the Auto Memory Doll (2019).) after writing the hymn of the sea for Leiden's annual Thanksgiving festival, Violet receives a request from a terminally ill boy named Yuris to write letters for his family. She writes one to Yuris's mother, father, and younger brother, and promises to deliver them once he passes on, but is unable to write a final one to his friend Lucas due to his deteriorating condition.

Meanwhile, Claudia Hodgins finds an undelivered letter with a distant address on it and recognizes the handwriting to be from Gilbert Bougainvillea, whom he thought to be dead. He informs Gilbert's brother Dietfried, and deduces the letter's origin is from the remote island of Ekarte. Curious about its authenticity, Claudia decides to go and brings Violet with him. Upon reaching the island, Claudia finds Gilbert alive yet missing his right eye and arm. Gilbert, now a teacher on the island under the alias "Jilbert", declines to meet Violet due to his guilt of bringing her misery, thinking that she will be happier without him. Violet tries to meet him but the latter insists on not wanting to see her, causing her to emotionally break down.

A storm prevents Violet and Claudia from leaving the island when suddenly, they received a telegraph message stating that Yuris' condition is critical. Unable to write Yuris's final letter to his friend Lucas, Violet asks Iris Cannary to substitute for her. Benedict Blue brings Iris to the hospital, where they find Yuris completely bedridden. They decide to let him talk to Lucas via telephone to deliver his final message before passing away. After his death, Yuris' parents take turns in reading the letters he requested from Violet.

Happy to know Gilbert is alive, Violet bittersweetly accepts his wishes and writes a final letter to him before she and Claudia leave the island. Touched by her words, as well as the support of Dietfried, who arrived on the island in search of him, Gilbert chases Violet as she boards a ship. He reunites with Violet when she jumps off the ship and tells her about his love for her, promising that he will stay by her side from now on. Violet later resigns from CH Postal Company to live with Gilbert on the island. Back in the present, Daisy visits the island to learn from the locals about their history with Violet and writes a letter to her parents, with whom she is estranged, in hopes of mending their conflict.

== Voice cast ==
Character	Japanese	English
Violet Evergarden	Yui Ishikawa	Erika Harlacher
Gilbert Bougainvillea	Daisuke Namikawa	Tony Azzolino
Claudia Hodgins	Takehito Koyasu	Kyle McCarley
Dietfried Bougainvillea	Hidenobu Kiuchi	Keith Silverstein
Iris Canary	Haruka Tomatsu	Cherami Leigh
Benedict Blue	Kōki Uchiyama	Ben Pronsky
Cattleya Baudelaire	Aya Endo	Reba Buhr
Erica Brown	Minori Chihara	Christine Marie Cabanos
Yuris	Kaori Mizuhashi	Anne Yatco
Lucas	Rina Satō	Cassandra Lee Morris
Daisy Magnolia	Sumire Morohoshi	Brittany Cox

== Production ==
In March 2018, the wrap-around jacket for newly released Violet Evergarden Gaiden light novel volume by Kana Akatsuki revealed that there was a "new project in progress". At the Violet Evergarden Film & Concert special event in July 2018, the project was revealed to be an anime film based on Akatsuki's light novel series. Taichi Ishidate was revealed to be directing the film at Kyoto Animation in April 2019, along with Reiko Yoshida as the screenwriter and Akiko Takase as the character designer. Ishidate initially hesitated to helm the direct sequel to the 2018 anime television series Violet Evergarden because its ending was the "entirety of the story I intended to tell", but later "spurred to action" after reading Yoshida's script that made him think that it was "fine for Gilbert [Bougainvillea] to live". In July 2019, an arson attack took place at one of Kyoto Animation's studio buildings, destroying most of their upcoming projects in the works and past animation materials from the fire. Violet Evergarden Production Committee announced in September 2019 that the production work on the film was "still continuing", while the scheduled January 2020 release was delayed. The film was shot with a 2.31:1 screen ratio instead of 16:9 that was previously used for Violet Evergarden anime series, which was initially proposed by director Haruka Fujita and used in the 2019 film Violet Evergarden: Eternity and the Auto Memory Doll.

== Music ==
Evan Call was revealed to be composing Violet Evergarden: The Movie in April 2019, after previously doing so for Violet Evergarden and Violet Evergarden: Eternity and the Auto Memory Doll. In February 2020, the film's theme music was revealed to be performed by True titled "Will", with its single being released in Japan on September 16. The film's original soundtrack is included in Call's soundtrack album titled Violet Evergarden: Echo Through Eternity, which was released in Japan on October 21, 2020.

All music is composed by Call, except where indicated.

Original Soundtrack of Violet Evergarden: The Movie track listing
No.	Title	Lyrics	Music	Length
1.	"Discovering the Past"			2:50
2.	"Generation to Generation"			1:55
3.	"The Legacy of Violet Evergarden"			1:45
4.	"Hymn to the Sea Pt. 1"			1:09
5.	"Some Scars Never Fade"			1:49
6.	"Sometimes Dreams Come True"			2:28
7.	"On That Fateful Night"			1:45
8.	"Dear Gilbert"			1:11
9.	"Though Times May Change"			1:11
10.	"Bonded by Tragedy"			1:47
11.	"Another Voice Calls Out"			1:26
12.	"A Young Boy's Hope"			2:10
13.	"Complicated Feelings"			2:17
14.	"Brotherhood"			2:20
15.	"Violet's Promise"			2:30
16.	"Yuris' Confession"			1:50
17.	"Hodgins' Request"			1:24
18.	"As the Days Pass Us By"			1:41
19.	"Hymn to the Sea Pt. 2"			1:14
20.	"Beyond These Waves"			1:32
21.	"After All These Years"			1:53
22.	"The Hardships of Gilbert Bougainvillea"			2:55
23.	"The Heart Quivers"			2:20
24.	"Tears in the Rain"			3:44
25.	"Her Soul Yearns"			1:00
26.	"A Young Boy's Last Wish"			2:28
27.	"His Final Breath"			3:19
28.	"Live on for Me"			2:12
29.	"After the Storm Comes a New Day"			2:12
30.	"Violet's Final Letter"			2:17
31.	"Michishirube ~Movie Version~"	Minori Chihara	Daisuke Kikuta	4:10
32.	"Echo Through Eternity"			3:16
33.	"Her Spirit Lives On"			3:16
34.	"Will ~Movie Version~"	Miho Karasawa		3:26
35.	"To Future People ~Movie Version~"	Karasawa	Satomi Kawasaki	3:49
Total length:				78:31

== Marketing ==
A teaser trailer and a key visual for Violet Evergarden: The Movie were released in April 2019. The film's second teaser trailer and key visual were respectively released in February and March 2020. In March 2020, the film held collaboration with instant noodle brand Acecook in promoting its release. Three short stories written by Akatsuki were given to the filmgoers who have viewed the film in Japan: Benedict Blue's Violet (ベネディクト・ブルーの菫), Oscar's Little Angel (オスカーの小さな天使), Violet Evergarden If (ヴァイオレット・エヴァーガーデン If), and Gilbert Bougainvillea and the Transient Dream (ギルベルト・ブーゲンビリアと儚い夢).

== Release ==
=== Theatrical ===
Violet Evergarden: The Movie premiered in Japan on September 18, 2020, and was released in Dolby Cinema on November 13, making it the first stand-alone Japanese animated film to do so as opposed to compilation films that were previously released. The film was previously scheduled to be released on January 10, 2020, before it was shifted to April 24 due to the arson attack, and then to the September release due to the COVID-19 pandemic. The film was released in Australia and New Zealand by Madman Entertainment on December 3, 2020, in the United States and Canada by Funimation on March 30, 2021, and in the United Kingdom and Ireland by Anime Limited on July 1, 2021.

=== Home media ===
Violet Evergarden: The Movie was released on Blu-ray and DVD in Japan on October 13, 2021, from its original August 4 release, delayed due to "issues with production and manufacturing because of the ongoing state of emergency". To commemorate the home video release, the short stories given to filmgoers who had viewed the film and Eternity and the Auto Memory Doll were collected into a single paperback titled Violet Evergarden: Last Letter (ヴァイオレット・エヴァーガーデン ～ラスト・レター～), which was released in Japan in mid-January 2022. It contains additional two new stories titled "Dietfried Bougainvillea If" (ディートフリート・ブーゲンビリアIf) and "Starry Night and the Lonely Two" (星降りの夜とさみしいふたり). The film was released in 4K and HDR with its Blu-ray special edition, making it the first film from Kyoto Animation to be released in those formats for a home video release. The film was aired on Nippon TV on November 25, 2022.

Netflix began streaming the film in the United States on October 13, 2021, and in Japan on April 13, 2022. Anime Limited released the film in the United Kingdom and Ireland on 4K Ultra HD Blu-ray on August 29, 2022, and released it with 4K UHD and Blu-ray collector's edition, and Blu-ray standard edition on December 5. Crunchyroll released the film on the regular and limited editions of 4K Ultra HD and Blu-ray combo pack and on stand-alone Blu-ray on May 30, 2023.

== Reception ==
=== Box office ===
Violet Evergarden: The Movie grossed $20.2 million in Japan and $1.4 million in other territories, for a worldwide total of $21.6 million. The film is the second highest-grossing anime film produced by Kyoto Animation and the seventh highest-grossing domestic film of 2020 in Japan.

Violet Evergarden: The Movie earned $5.4 million in its opening weekend (including Monday and Tuesday holidays) in Japan, ranking second behind Christopher Nolan's Tenet (2020). The film earned $1.3 million in its second weekend, staying at second place, and reached the one-billion-yen box office in its third weekend after earning $1.2 million. Over 1 million tickets were sold for the film in its fifth weekend. The film remained in the top ten Japanese box office ranking for 11 consecutive weeks since its release. The film grossed ¥2 billion ($19.3 million) in its twelfth weekend.

=== Critical response ===
The review aggregator website Rotten Tomatoes reported a 100% approval rating, with an average score of 9.2/10, based on 10 reviews. The Japanese review and survey firm Filmarks reported that the film had an approval rating of 4.39, ranking it first in their Satisfaction Ranking of 2020 survey.

Violet Evergarden: The Movie received praise from Japanese video game designer Hideo Kojima. Phuong Le at The Guardian gave the film 4 out of 5 stars, lauding its "breathtaking" animation. She felt that the film served not just a "closure for the character but also a moving return for one of Japan's most beloved animation studios" following the arson attack. Richard Eisenbeis of Anime News Network graded the film "A", describing it as "fantastic" and an "emotional experience with a deep insight into the human condition". He lauded the three overlapping stories that would "destroy you emotionally", "vibrant" visuals, and "perfectly composed" music. Eisenbeis' colleague Kim Morrissy graded the film "B", finding its two-hour runtime a "detriment for the kind of storytelling it was going for" since she noted that the franchise worked "best in short and sweet installments" while feeling that the plot about Violet and Gilbert was "flat".

=== Accolades ===
Year	Award	Category	Nominee(s)	Result	Ref.
2021	Mainichi Film Awards	Best Animation Film	Violet Evergarden: The Movie	Nominated	
2021	Tokyo Anime Awards Festival	Anime of the Year (Feature Film)	Violet Evergarden: The Movie	Won	
2021	Tokyo Anime Awards Festival	Individual Award (Writers)	Reiko Yoshida	Won	
2021	Tokyo Anime Awards Festival	Individual Award (Visual Artists)	Mikiko Watanabe	Won	
2021	Japan Media Arts Festival	Excellence Award	Violet Evergarden: The Movie	Won	
2021	Japan Academy Film Prize	Animation of the Year	Violet Evergarden: The Movie	Nominated	
