= Violet Evergarden: Eternity and the Auto Memory Doll =

2019 Japanese animated film by Haruka Fujita

- Theatrical release poster
- Kanji: ヴァイオレット・エヴァーガーデン 外伝 永遠と自動手記人形
- Revised Hepburn: Vaioretto Evāgāden Gaiden: Eien to Jidō Shuki Ningyō
- Directed by: Haruka Fujita
- Screenplay by: Takaaki Suzuki; Tatsuhiko Urahata
- Based on: Violet Evergarden by Kana Akatsuki
- Produced by: Shinichirō Hatta; Shinichi Nakamura; Kazusa Umeda; Megumi Suzuki; Shigeru Saitō
- Starring: Yui Ishikawa; Minako Kotobuki; Aoi Yūki; Takehito Koyasu; Kouki Uchiyama; Aya Endo
- Cinematography: Kōhei Funamoto
- Edited by: Kengo Shigemura
- Music by: Evan Call
- Production company: Kyoto Animation
- Distributed by: Shochiku
- Release dates: August 3, 2019 (Germany); September 6, 2019 (Japan)
- Running time: 90 minutes
- Country: Japan
- Language: Japanese
- Box office: US$14.98 million

Violet Evergarden: Eternity and the Auto Memory Doll (Note: Japanese: ヴァイオレット・エヴァーガーデン 外伝 永遠と自動手記人形, Hepburn: Vaioretto Evāgāden Gaiden: Eien to Jidō Shuki Ningyō; lit. 'Violet Evergarden Side Story: Eternity and the Auto Memory Doll') is a 2019 Japanese animated film based on the Violet Evergarden light novel series by Kana Akatsuki. Produced by Kyoto Animation and distributed by Shochiku, the film is directed by Haruka Fujita from a script written by Takaaki Suzuki and Tatsuhiko Urahata, and stars Yui Ishikawa, Minako Kotobuki, Aoi Yūki, Takehito Koyasu, Kouki Uchiyama, and Aya Endo. In the film, Violet Evergarden arrives at a private women's academy to tutor the daughter of the York noble family named Isabella.

Kyoto Animation revealed in April 2019 a side-story film, with Fujita being announced as its director. The film was completed a day before one of their buildings was arsoned in July 2019. Kotobuki and Yūki were revealed as part of the returning cast of Violet Evergarden anime television series in August 2019 to voice the new characters.

Violet Evergarden: Eternity and the Auto Memory Doll premiered in Germany on August 3, 2019, and was released in Japan on September 6. The film grossed over $14 million worldwide.

== Plot ==
Violet Evergarden is sent to a prestigious girls' boarding school by request of the Drossel royal family to assist one of the students, Isabella York, in her training as a debutante. As Violet accompanies Isabella, it becomes clear that she does not like attending the school since she finds it difficult to fit in and has no interest in learning any of the skills required for a debutante. She also is not in good health, as she suffers from periodic coughing fits. Isabella is initially distrustful of Violet but becomes more accepting of her when she realizes Violet is not interested in her aristocratic status. Isabella later reveals to Violet that she was Amy Bartlett, an illegitimate child of the York family. She used to live in poverty and adopted an orphan, Taylor, as her younger sister. However, the York family later tracked her down and asked her to join the family, with them promising a better life for Taylor in return. Realizing she couldn't properly care for Taylor, Isabella reluctantly accepted. Isabella then has Violet write a letter for Taylor. With her job done, Violet returns to Leiden. Benedict Blue delivers the letter to Taylor, who now lives at an orphanage.

Three years later, Taylor makes her way to Leiden to find the CH Postal Company, where she finally meets Violet and asks to work as a postman. While reluctant to hire a child, Claudia Hodgins allows Violet's request to let Taylor work at the company until he can arrange her return to her orphanage, and assigns Benedict to train her. After taking Taylor along his route, Benedict realizes that Taylor cannot read, meaning she wouldn't be able to read addresses on letters. Violet then decides to teach Taylor. The next day, Violet takes Taylor on a new delivery route. Taylor tells Violet she wants to be a postman so that she can "deliver happiness", just like Benedict did when he delivered Isabella's letter to her. Violet then helps Taylor write a letter to Isabella, and Benedict agrees to track her down to deliver it. Benedict obtains a new motorcycle from Hodgins and takes Taylor with him to find Isabella. Benedict delivers the letter, but Taylor decides not to meet her yet until she becomes a real postman so she can deliver her letters herself. Taylor is later adopted by the Evergarden family, while Violet and Benedict continue their work.

== Voice cast ==
Character	Japanese	English
Violet Evergarden	Yui Ishikawa	Erika Harlacher
Isabella York	Minako Kotobuki	Colleen O'Shaughnessey
Taylor Bartlett	Aoi Yūki	Sandy Fox
Claudia Hodgins	Takehito Koyasu	Kyle McCarley
Benedict Blue	Kouki Uchiyama	Ben Pronsky
Cattleya Baudelaire	Aya Endo	Reba Buhr
Iris Canary	Haruka Tomatsu	Cherami Leigh
Erica Brown	Minori Chihara	Christine Marie Cabanos

== Production ==
Haruka Fujita was revealed to be directing a side-story film that would tell "another story" of Violet Evergarden at Kyoto Animation in April 2019, after previously serving as the series director of the 2018 anime television series Violet Evergarden. The film adapted the second chapter of Violet Evergarden Gaiden light novel volume by Kana Akatsuki. It was originally intended to be a two-episode, 20-minute-long original video animation, but the staff invested excessively in the world that was to be explored in the plot, thus it was expanded into a feature-length film. Fujita wanted to make the film in a 2.31:1 aspect ratio, instead of the more standard 16:9 that the original show was made in. The staff did location scouting in Germany, with Fujita explaining that the country was a "different world; the animals are different, the doors are larger than you could imagine, the ceilings are high, and the walls are thick" as compared to the modern parts of Japan.

The film was completed on July 17, 2019, a day before the Kyoto Animation arson attack. In light of the massacre, Fujita requested to credit all the staff members who participated in the production of the film, going against Kyoto Animation's policy of crediting only those who had previously worked with the studio for at least a year. The film's staff was revealed in August 2019, including screenwriters Takaaki Suzuki and Tatsuhiko Urahata, character designer Akiko Takase, and cinematographer Kōhei Funamoto. In the same month, the cast of Violet Evergarden was revealed to be reprising their roles in the film, with Minako Kotobuki and Aoi Yūki joining them to respectively voice the new characters, Isabella York and Taylor Bartlett.

== Music ==
Evan Call composed the music for Violet Evergarden: Eternity and the Auto Memory Doll, while Minori Chihara performed the film's ending theme music titled "Amy" (エイミー). The single was released in Japan on September 4, 2019. The film's original soundtrack is included in Call's soundtrack album titled Violet Evergarden: Echo Through Eternity, which was released in Japan on October 21, 2020.

Original Soundtrack of Violet Evergarden: Eternity and the Auto Memory Doll track listing
No.	Title	Length
1.	"Violet and Isabella"	3:01
2.	"A New Era Begins"	1:51
3.	"No Matter How Far"	2:28
4.	"A Bond Between Sisters"	3:44
5.	"Debutante Waltz"	2:00
6.	"Debutante Waltz for Piano"	1:44
Total length:		14:48

== Marketing ==
A key visual for Violet Evergarden: Eternity and the Auto Memory Doll was released in July 2019. Violet Evergarden's voice actress Yui Ishikawa, singers True and Aira Yūki, and producer Shigeru Saitō attended the film's world premiere in Germany in August 2019 to promote its release. In the same month, a trailer for the film was released. A set of stage greetings for the film's release in Japan began in September 2019, starting at Shinjuku Piccadilly theater. Four short-story booklets written by Akatsuki were given to the filmgoers who have viewed the film in Japan: Anne Magnolia and Her Nineteenth Birthday (アン・マグノリアと十九歳の誕生日), Leon Stephanotis and the First Star (リオン・ステファノティスと一番星), Charlotte Abelfreyja Drossel and the Forest Kingdom (シャルロッテ・エーベルフレイヤ・フリューゲルと森の王国), and Isabella York and the Rain of Flowers (イザベラ・ヨークと花の雨).

== Release ==
=== Theatrical ===
Violet Evergarden: Eternity and the Auto Memory Doll held its world premiere at the AnimagiC convention in Germany on August 3, 2019. The organizers revealed that the decision to continue the film's release following the arson attack at Kyoto Animation was "at the express request of the studio". The film was released in Japan on September 6, 2019, and was set to screen for three weeks from the original two-week theatrical run, but it was extended beyond four weeks instead. The film was screened in China on January 10, 2020, making it the first film from Kyoto Animation to be released in the country. The film was released in the United States by Funimation on February 17, 2020, and in the United Kingdom by Anime Limited on March 1.

=== Home media ===
Violet Evergarden: Eternity and the Auto Memory Doll was released on Blu-ray and DVD in Japan on March 18, 2020. It includes the fifth short-story booklet written by Akatsuki titled Amy Bartlett and the Spring Sunshine Filtered Through Leaves (エイミー・バートレットと春の木漏れ日). Netflix began streaming the film on April 2, 2020, while Funimation released it on Blu-ray, DVD, and digital in the United States on December 1. Anime Limited released the Blu-ray collector's edition for the film in the United Kingdom and Ireland on August 9, 2021, and the standard edition on December 12, 2022.

== Reception ==
=== Box office ===
Violet Evergarden: Eternity and the Auto Memory Doll grossed $7.6 million in Japan and $7.4 million in other territories, for a worldwide total of $14.98 million.

The film ranked sixth in its opening weekend in Japan, placing behind One Piece: Stampede (2019). It earned $927,500 in its second weekend, dropping to eighth place, and $519,000 in its third weekend. Outside Japan, the film earned $3.6 million and ranked third in its opening weekend in China.

=== Critical response ===
The review aggregator website Rotten Tomatoes reported an approval rating of 80%, with an average score of 8/10, based on 5 reviews. The Japanese ticketing and publishing company Pia and review and survey firm Filmarks placed Violet Evergarden: Eternity and the Auto Memory Doll first in their premiere satisfaction surveys.

Daryl Harding of Crunchyroll lauded the film for its animation, direction, and music, feeling that its 90-minute runtime was not stretched out. He praised the character growth among the existing cast and the new ones that might not appear in future installments. Kim Morrisy of Anime News Network graded the film "B+", feeling that the "[b]ittersweet theme of treasuring ephemeral experiences is powerful" and lauding its "great production values and direction". However, she felt that the two stories focusing first on Isabella York and second on Taylor Bartlett were "representative of the series' strengths and flaws" due to being "disjointed" and having a "weak transition" between them.

== Continuation ==
=== Violet Evergarden: The Movie ===
In March 2018, a project based on the light novel series was reported to be "in progress". The project was revealed in July 2018 to be an anime film. Produced by Kyoto Animation, Violet Evergarden: The Movie is directed by Taichi Ishidate from a script written by Reiko Yoshida. The film was released in Japan on September 18, 2020, after two delays due to the arson attack and the COVID-19 pandemic.
