= Reba Buhr =

American voice actress (born 1987)

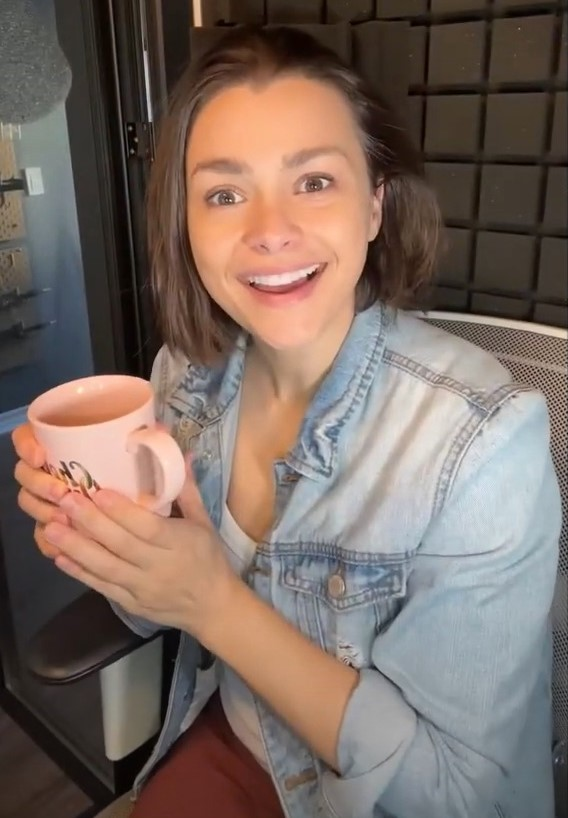
- Buhr in 2024
- Born: November 7, 1987 (age 38)
- Occupation: Voice actress
- Years active: 2010–present

Reba Buhr (born November 7, 1987) is an American voice actress who has worked on English dubbed anime series, Western animated TV series, and video games. She hosted the news segment Disney 365 on the Disney Channel from 2011–2012. Some of her roles include Misty in Pokémon Masters, Rose Lavillant and Juleka Couffaine in Miraculous: Tales of Ladybug & Cat Noir, Jennifer Record in ID-0, Yukie Kanoko in Godzilla Singular Point, Milo in Revisions, and Kohiruimaki Karen/LLENN in Sword Art Online: Alternative Gun Gale Online. Buhr is also a singer, having studied Theater and Voice at Occidental College, and has performed live at Disney's California Adventure as Jasmine in Aladdin! A Musical Spectacular, among other shows.

== Filmography ==
=== Anime ===
List of dubbing voice performances in anime
Year	Title	Role	Notes and sources
2014–15	Knights of Sidonia	Numi Tahiro	
2016	Kuromukuro	Liu Shenmei	
2016	Magi: Adventure of Sinbad	Pipirika	
2016–17	The Asterisk War: The Academy City on the Water	Miko Yanase	
2016–18	Hunter x Hunter	Ponzu, Podungo Lapoy, Coco Loo	2011 series
2017	Blame!	Fuku	Film
2017	ID-0	Jennifer Record	
2017	Shopkins World Vacation	Crispy	
2018	Children of the Whales	Ginshu	
2018	Violet Evergarden	Cattleya Baudelaire	
2018	Granblue Fantasy: The Animation	Yuel	
2018	Saint Seiya: The Lost Canvas	Sasha, Athena	
2018	Next Gen	Diagnostic Computer	
2018–19	Forest of Piano	Namie, Reiko Ichinose	
2018	Sirius the Jaeger	Ryoko Naoe	
2018	Hi Score Girl	Nikotama	
2018	Lost Song	Pony Goodlight/Alea Golt	
2018	The Seven Deadly Sins The Movie: Prisoners of the Sky	Gara	Film
2018	Gundam Build Divers	Nanami Nanase / Nami	
2018	Sword Art Online Alternative: Gun Gale Online	Kohiruimaki Karen/LLENN	
2018	Yo-Kai Watch	Katie Forester, Lily Adams, Hidabat, Next HarMEOWny; additional voices	
2019	Gundam Build Divers	Namami Nanase, Hero	
2019	Revisions	Milo	
2019	Sound! Euphonium: The Movie – Our Promise: A Brand New Day	Asuka Tanaka	
2019	Kengan Ashura	Shion Soryuin, Rino Kurayoshi, Elena Robinson	
2019	Fate/Grand Order - Absolute Demonic Front: Babylonia	Silvia	
2019–present	Ascendance of a Bookworm	Myne	
2020	The Idhun Chronicles	Additional voices	English Dub
2020	Yashahime	Little Girl	Episode: "Furudera no neko Juan"
2020	Violet Evergarden: Eternity and the Auto Memory Doll	Cattleya Baudelaire	
2020–2024	Demon Slayer: Kimetsu no Yaiba	Aoi Kanzaki	
2020	Drifting Dragons	Mayne, Narrator	
2020	The 8th Son? Are You Kidding Me?	Elize	
2020	Dorohedoro	Nikaidō	
2020	A Whisker Away	Miki Saitō, Tamaki	
2020	BNA: Brand New Animal	Marie Itami	
2021	Godzilla Singular Point	Additional voices	
2021	Scarlet Nexus	Arashi Spring	
2021–23	Record of Ragnarok	Aphrodite, Castor	
2021	Violet Evergarden: The Movie	Cattleya Baudelaire	Film
2022	Black Rock Shooter: Dawn Fall	Black Trike, Jessica	
2023	Junji Ito Maniac: Tales of the Macabre	Kuriko	Episode: "Unendurable Labyrinth The Bully"
2023	KonoSuba: An Explosion on This Wonderful World!	Wolbach/Funifura	
2023	Jujutsu Kaisen	Riko Amanai	Season 2
2024	The Grimm Variations	Sawako Otawara	Episode 1: "Cinderella"
2024	Tower of God 2nd Season	Yeo Goseng, Maschenny	
2026	Chainsmoker Cat	Imoko Sato	

=== TV, film, and webseries ===
Year	Title	Role	Notes and sources
2011–2012	Disney 365	Host	
2016	The Jungle Bunch to the Rescue		Listed among voices for the English version of the episode "The Christmas Heist"
2017–2018	Zak Storm	Clovis	
2018–present	Miraculous: Tales of Ladybug & Cat Noir	Rose Lavillant/Pigella, Juleka Couffaine/Purple Tigress, Gina Dupain	Season 2 onward, replacing Erin Fitzgerald
2019	The Rookie	Arizona	Season 2, Episode 9 "Breaking Point"
2019–2021	Power Players	Bobbie Blobby	
2020	ZooPhobia	Kayla	Speaking voice Ep. "Bad Luck Jack"; web short
2020	Hayop Ka!	Nimfa Dimaano	English Dub, Film
2021	Fate/Grand Order The Movie Divine Realm of the Round Table: Camelot Wandering; Agateram	Xuanzang Sanzang	
2023	Ladybug & Cat Noir: The Movie	Rose Lavillant, Juleka Couffaine	
2026	Hello Neighbor: Welcome to Raven Brooks	Finch, Gerda/Baker	Listed as Voice Actor in the Credits.

=== Video games ===
Year	Title	Role	Notes and sources
2017	Dropzone	Sledge	
2018	Grand Chase: Dimensional Chaser	Elesis Sieghart	
2019	Pokémon Masters	Misty	Mobile game
2019	Nancy Drew: Midnight in Salem	Mei Parry	
2020	Fire Emblem Heroes	Jill	
2020	One-Punch Man: A Hero Nobody Knows	Additional voices	
2020	Ninjala	Lucy, Lucy's Mom, Bystanders	
2021	Scarlet Nexus	Arashi Spring	
2021	Tales of Arise	Naori	
2021	Demon Slayer: Kimetsu no Yaiba – The Hinokami Chronicles	Aoi Kanzaki	
2022	AI: The Somnium Files – Nirvana Initiative	Receptionist Ritsuko Enshu	
2023	Fire Emblem Engage	Ivy	
2023	Octopath Traveler II	Additional voices	
2023	Armored Core VI: Fires of Rubicon	Chartreuse, additional voices	
2024	Unicorn Overlord	Mercenaries (Type F), additional voices	
2024	Demon Slayer: Kimetsu no Yaiba – Sweep the Board	Aoi Kanzaki	
2025	Demon Slayer: Kimetsu no Yaiba – The Hinokami Chronicles 2	Aoi Kanzaki	
2026	The Legend of Zelda: Ocarina of Time	Koume, Kotake, Twinrova	

=== Theatre and live shows ===
Year	Title	Role	Notes and sources
2012	Aladdin! A Musical Spectacular	Jasmine	
2013	Kiss Me, Kate	Lois Lane/Bianca	

=== Audiobooks ===
Year	Title	Author	Book ID	Notes and sources
2019	Sting & Song	Benjamin Medrano	ISBN 1-6877-6618-5	
2021	Cinnamon Bun	RavensDagger	ASIN B08BZ2NW67	
2022	Phoebe's Tale: From His Shadow	Garon Whited	ASIN B0B5YGHC3Q	
2023	Ascendance of a Bookworm: Part 1 Volume 1	Miya Kazuki	ASIN B0CR4DR8M4	
