= Violet Evergarden =

Japanese light novel series and its adaptations

- First light novel volume cover, featuring Violet Evergarden

ヴァイオレット・エヴァーガーデン (Vaioretto Evāgāden)
- Genre: Coming-of-age; Steampunk
- Light novel
- Written by: Kana Akatsuki
- Illustrated by: Akiko Takase
- Published by: Kyoto Animation
- Imprint: KA Esuma Bunko
- Original run: December 25, 2015 – March 27, 2020
- Volumes: 4
- Anime television series
- Directed by: Taichi Ishidate; Haruka Fujita (Note: Series Unit Director (シリーズ演出))
- Produced by: Shinichirou Hatta; Shinichi Nakamura; Kazusa Umeda; Shigeru Saitou
- Written by: Reiko Yoshida
- Music by: Evan Call
- Studio: Kyoto Animation
- Licensed by: Netflix (streaming); Crunchyroll (home video) (Note: In North America through Crunchyroll, LLC (formerly known as Funimation) and in Australia through Crunchyroll Pty. Ltd (formerly known as Madman Anime).); UK: Anime Limited (home video)
- Original network: Tokyo MX, TVA, ABC, BS11, HTB
- Original run: January 11, 2018 – April 5, 2018
- Episodes: 13 + OVA
- Anime films
- Violet Evergarden: Eternity and the Auto Memory Doll (2019); Violet Evergarden: The Movie (2020)
- icon

Violet Evergarden (Japanese: ヴァイオレット・エヴァーガーデン, Hepburn: Vaioretto Evāgāden) is a Japanese light novel series written by Kana Akatsuki and illustrated by Akiko Takase. It was published by Kyoto Animation under their KA Esuma Bunko imprint, from December 2015 to March 2020. The story follows the titular Violet Evergarden, a former child soldier who becomes an Auto Memory Doll tasked with writing letters intended to connect people.

A 13-episode anime television series adaptation produced by Kyoto Animation aired between January and April 2018 with several advance screenings taking place in 2017. An original video animation episode was released in July 2018, and a spin-off film premiered in Japan in September 2019. A second anime film, Violet Evergarden: The Movie, serving as a sequel to the anime series, premiered in September 2020.

In 2014, Violet Evergarden won the grand prize in the fifth Kyoto Animation Award's novel category.

== Synopsis ==
Following four long years of conflict, The Great War in the land of Telesis finally came to an end. Caught up in the bloodshed was Violet Evergarden, a young girl raised as a ruthless killer. Hospitalized and maimed in a bloody skirmish during the War's conclusion, she was left with only the words "I love you" from the person she held dearest, but with no understanding of their meaning.

Recovering from her wounds, Violet starts a new life working at CH Postal Company after a falling out with her new intended guardian family. There, she witnesses by pure chance the work of an "Auto Memory Doll", amanuenses that transcribe people's thoughts and feelings into words on paper. Moved by the notion, Violet begins work as an Auto Memory Doll, a trade that will take her on an adventure, one that will reshape the lives of her clients and hopefully lead to self-discovery.

== Characters ==
=== CH Postal Company ===
Violet Evergarden (ヴァイオレット・エヴァーガーデン, Vaioretto Evāgāden)
Voiced by: Yui Ishikawa (Japanese); Erika Harlacher (English)
Violet is a newcomer to the CH Postal Company, and works as an Auto Memory Doll—a ghostwriter for people who cannot write or are looking for help expressing their emotions in letters.
Claudia Hodgins (クラウディア・ホッジンズ, Kuraudia Hojjinzu)
Voiced by: Takehito Koyasu (Japanese); Kyle McCarley (English)
A former army lieutenant colonel, Claudia is the president of the CH Postal Company. He was a good friend of Gilbert during their time in the military and Claudia attempts to help Violet take the first steps of her new life in order to absolve himself of his own guilt, stemming from Violet's treatment back in the military.
Cattleya Baudelaire (カトレア・ボードレール, Katorea Bōdorēru)
Voiced by: Aya Endō (Japanese); Reba Buhr (English)
Cattleya is an Auto Memory Doll who works alongside Violet at the CH Postal Company as its most popular Doll. She has been close to Hodgins since before the company was established, and joined as one of its initial employees.
Benedict Blue (ベネディクト・ブルー, Benedikuto Burū)
Voiced by: Koki Uchiyama (Japanese); Ben Pronsky (English)
Benedict is a eccentric postman who works at the CH Postal Company. Alongside Cattleya, he maintained a close relationship with Hodgins before the company's establishment and eventually became one of its initial employees.
Erica Brown (エリカ・ブラウン, Erika Buraun)
Voiced by: Minori Chihara (Japanese); Christine Marie Cabanos (English)
Erica is an Auto Memory Doll working at the CH Postal Company. Her skills when it comes to client interaction are poor, but she continues to believe in her work as a Doll, attributing it to the inspiration she found upon reading the novel written by Molly Orland, a blind novelist.
Iris Cannary (アイリス・カナリー, Airisu Kanarī)
Voiced by: Haruka Tomatsu (Japanese); Cherami Leigh (English)
Iris is an Auto Memory Doll who started working at the CH Postal Company shortly after Erica was hired. Hailing from the small farming village of Kazaly, Iris has always admired the image of a working woman and has since aspired to become Leiden's most popular Auto Memory Doll.

=== Others ===
Gilbert Bougainvillea (ギルベルト・ブーゲンビリア, Giruberuto Būgenbiria)
Voiced by: Daisuke Namikawa (Japanese); Tony Azzolino (English)
A major in the Leidenschaftlich Army, Gilbert came from an aristocratic family. Although he treasures Violet much more than anything else, he never expressed his feelings to her because of their identity as soldiers. It is his final words to her—"I love you"—that drive her to move forward on her new path as an Auto Memory Doll. The only memento of Gilbert that Violet has is an emerald brooch that reminds her of Gilbert's eyes. As he wanted Violet to live a life like a normal girl, instead of a tool, he told Claudia to announce that he died in the war. However, he recovered from his injuries and lived in a rural place before meeting Violet several years later.
Dietfried Bougainvillea (ディートフリート・ブーゲンビリア, Dītofurīto Būgenbiria)
Voiced by: Hidenobu Kiuchi (Japanese); Keith Silverstein (English)
A navy captain and the older son of the Bougainvillea family, Dietfried is Gilbert's older brother. Though he was the one who first "gave" Violet to Gilbert, he treats Violet as a "tool" for war and resents her for the things she did to his men during the war. Dietfried also blames Gilbert's "death" on Violet, stating that she had failed to protect Gilbert as a tool for the war.
Luculia Marlborough (ルクリア・モールバラ, Rukuria Mōrubara)
Voiced by: Azusa Tadokoro (Japanese); Kira Buckland (English)
An Auto Memory Doll who first became friends with Violet during training school. She lives with her brother Spencer, a former soldier who has turned into a guilt-ridden drunk after failing to stop the death of their parents during the war.
Charlotte Abelfreyja Drossel (シャルロッテ・エーベルフレイヤ・ドロッセル, Sharurotte Ēberufureiya Dorosseru)
Voiced by: Megumi Nakajima (Japanese); Stephanie Sheh (English)
The 14-year-old princess of the Kingdom of Drossel. Charlotte is betrothed to the prince of Flügel, Damian Baldur Flügel—a man who is 10 years older than her—in the pursuit of peace between the two kingdoms. Their relationship is openly declared for the public by exchanging love letters written by the Auto Memory Dolls. While she genuinely wants to marry Damian, she is unsure if he feels the same. Recognizing the doll writing on behalf of the prince and wanting to stop Charlotte's tears, Violet hatches a scheme with Cattleya to have Charlotte and Damian write their own letters to each other. This has the effect of both strengthening the couple's relationship and increasing support from the people of both countries.
Leon Stephanotis (リオン・ステファノティス, Rion Sutefanotisu)
Voiced by: Yūto Uemura
A staff member working under the Shahar Observatory's Manuscript Division who was paired with Violet during a joint operation between the Observatory and a group of Auto Memory Dolls. Because of the circumstances behind his missing parents, he thinks that love causes people to become foolish.
Oscar Webster (オスカー・ウェブスター, Osukā Webusutā)
Voiced by: Satoshi Taki (Japanese); Joe Ochman (English)
A famous playwright who has become a drunk recluse after the loss of both his wife and daughter. Seeking to write his very first children's play and dedicate it to his daughter's memory, he entrusts Violet with the task of bringing his ideas to paper.
Anne Magnolia (アン・マグノリア, An Magunoria)
Voiced by: Sumire Morohoshi (Japanese); Cassandra Lee Morris (English)
Clara's daughter, Anne is a young girl who loves dolls and initially thought that Violet is a life-size doll. Noticing her mother's worsening health, Anne believes that visitors take away her remaining time with her mother, not knowing Clara's real intentions for Anne.
Clara Magnolia (クラーラ・マグノリア, Kurāra Magunoria)
Voiced by: Ayako Kawasumi (Japanese); Wendee Lee (English)
Anne's mother, Clara has a terminal illness and predicts that her fate is close. Worried that her daughter will be all alone after her death, she requested Violet to write 50 letters for Anne that will be sent on her birthday for the next 50 years.
Aiden Field (エイダン・フィールド, Eidan Fīrudo)
Voiced by: Shintarō Asanuma (Japanese); Johnny Yong Bosch (English)
A soldier fighting for the moderate faction of Ctrigal, a country plunged into a civil war against extremists who want the country to return to war. Not sure what to do with his money, he decided to use the service of Auto Memory Dolls to write letters for his parents and his childhood friend Maria.
Isabella York (イザベラ・ヨーク, Izabera Yōku)
Voiced by: Minako Kotobuki (Japanese); Colleen O'Shaughnessey (English)
A young woman who is assisted by Violet to debut into high society. She once lived in squalor as Amy Bartlett with her younger foster sister Taylor until she was found by a man claiming to be her father. Initially aloof to Violet, the two women become friends after learning of each other's backstories. However, she becomes reclusive sometime after Violet leaves until she receives an emotional letter from Taylor.
Taylor Bartlett (テイラー・バートレット, Teirā Bātoretto)
Voiced by: Aoi Yūki (Japanese); Sandy Fox (English)
A young girl who was taken in by Amy Bartlett. When Amy is forced to leave her behind, Taylor is sent to the orphanage. After receiving a letter from Amy, by then going under the name Isabella York, she tracks down Violet a few years later to become a mail courier but also to reunite with Amy once more.

== Media ==
=== Light novels ===
Violet Evergarden is written by Kana Akatsuki and illustrated by Akiko Takase. Published by Kyoto Animation under their KA Esuma Bunko imprint, from December 25, 2015, to March 27, 2020.

No.	Release date	ISBN
1	December 25, 2015	978-4-907064-43-3
2	December 26, 2016	978-4-907064-44-0
Gaiden	March 23, 2018	978-4-907064-81-5
3	March 27, 2020	978-4-910052-04-5

=== Anime ===
The anime adaptation was first announced via a commercial of the light novel's first volume in May 2016. In June 2017, Kyoto Animation announced that Anime Expo, AnimagiC, and C3 AFA Singapore 2017 would host the world premiere of the first episode. The second episode was first screened at the KyoAni and Do Fan Days 2017 event on October 21, 2017, and the third episode in five theaters across Japan on December 10, 2017. The 13-episode anime aired from January 11 to April 5, 2018, in Japan. An original video animation episode was released on July 4, 2018, with the final Blu-ray and DVD volume. The series is directed by Taichi Ishidate at Kyoto Animation with the screenplay written by Reiko Yoshida. Akiko Takase designed the characters and Yota Tsuruoka handles the sound direction. The opening theme is "Sincerely" by True while the ending theme is "Michishirube" (みちしるべ; lit. "Guidepost") by Minori Chihara. Netflix began streaming the series worldwide on January 11, 2018, except for the United States and Australia, where they began streaming on April 5, 2018. Anime Limited acquired the series for home video distribution in the United Kingdom and Ireland, and premiered the first episode at MCM London Comic Con on October 28, 2017. Madman Entertainment acquired the home video distribution rights for the series in Australia and New Zealand.

No.	Title (Note: All English titles are taken from Netflix.)	Directed by	Written by	Original release date
1	""I Love You" and Auto Memory Dolls"; Transliteration: ""Aishiteru" to Jidō Shuki Ningyō" (Japanese: 「愛してる」と自動手記人形)	Taichi Ishidate; Haruka Fujita; Shinpei Sawa	Reiko Yoshida	January 11, 2018
Violet is a soldier in the Leidenschaftlich Army who served under Major Gilbert Bougainvillea, whom she was utterly devoted to. However, Violet is injured after a mission which resulted in the loss of her arms, requiring them to be replaced with prostheses. Colonel Hodgins, an old acquaintance of Gilbert, arrives to pick up Violet. He explains to Violet that the war they were fighting has ended and peace has come, though he is unwilling to tell Violet what happened to Gilbert. They leave for the capital city of Leiden, where Gilbert had already arranged for Violet to be adopted by the Evergarden family. However, Violet cannot adjust to civilian life due to her military indoctrination. Hodgins later decides to show Violet his business, the CH postal company which acts as a private mail and ghostwriting service and hires her as a postal worker. She then witnesses the Auto Memory Dolls of the ghostwriting department writing a letter for an illiterate man who wants to proclaim his love to someone. Violet then remembers that "I love you" were the last words Gilbert had told her. Wanting to know the meaning of the words, Violet asks Hodgins for her to join the ghostwriting department. Impressed that Violet has finally shown signs of acting on her own free will instead of on someone else's orders, Hodgins accepts Violet's request despite her not being an Auto Memory Doll.
2	"Never Coming Back"; Transliteration: "Modotte Konai" (Japanese: 「戻って来ない」)	Haruka Fujita	Reiko Yoshida	January 18, 2018
Violet joins the ghostwriting department and meets its members: the veteran Cattleya, and the two rookies Erica and Iris. Under Cattleya's direction, Violet begins her training as an Auto Memory Doll, quickly learning how to use a typewriter. However, despite her technical proficiency, Violet is still incapable of understanding emotions. This comes to a head when she offers to write a romantic letter that ends up angering both the recipient and the client. Erica then confronts Violet about her motivations to become a Doll, but relents when Violet tells her about her desire to learn the meaning of the words "I love you." Iris suggests to Hodgins to fire Violet, but Erica comes to her defense, partly motivated due to her own insecurities about being a proper Doll. Hodgins decides not to fire Violet and gives her a new uniform, along with the brooch Gilbert had originally given to Violet, which Hodgins managed to recover. Violet is overjoyed at the return of the brooch, and agrees to attend a Doll training course. That night, Hodgins confides in Cattleya that he used to be friends with Gilbert, and that Gilbert is "never coming back."
3	"May You Be an Exemplary Auto Memory Doll"; Transliteration: "Anata ga Yoki Jido Shuki Ningyō ni Narimasu Yō ni" (Japanese: 「あなたが、良き自動手記人形になりますように」)	Noriyuki Kitanohara	Tatsuhiko Urahata	January 25, 2018
Violet attends the Auto Memory Doll Training School in order to become a true doll. There, she meets and befriends a girl named Luculia Marlborough. The next day, Violet and Luculia are assigned to practice their actual ghostwriting skills on each other. However, Instructor Rhodanthe is unimpressed with the way Violet ghostwrote Luculia's letter, informing her that letters are an instrument for communicating a person's feelings, and that letter she ghostwrote was unacceptable. Luculia decides to take Violet to her favorite spot atop a bell tower to show her the view, and it is revealed Luculia's brother is crippled from the war and is now a drunkard. However, Violet fails to pass the class while Luculia graduates with top marks. Luculia meets Violet again and offers to ghostwrite a letter to Gilbert, but Violet cannot find the words to say. Luculia then tells Violet how her parents died in the war and her brother feels guilty over failing to protect them. She wants to tell her brother that she is just glad he is alive and back home, but likewise cannot find the words to say. Touched by Luculia's words, Violet manages to write a short and concise letter that effectively conveys Luculia's feelings to her beloved elder brother. Upon being shown the letter, Instructor Rhodanthe allows Violet to graduate and Luculia helps her elder brother to the top of the bell tower to enjoy the view like they used to as children.
4	"You Won't be a Tool but a Person Worthy of that Name"; Transliteration: "Kimi wa Dōgudenaku, Sono Na ga Niau Hito ni Narunda" (Japanese: 君は道具でなく、その名が似合う人になるんだ)	Shinpei Sawa	Reiko Yoshida	February 1, 2018
Iris receives a personal ghostwriting request from her hometown, but accidentally injures her hand. As a result, Violet is sent along with her to assist her in writing. Upon arriving, Iris is met by her parents, and her mother reveals that she was the one who sent the request in order to get Iris to come back to celebrate her birthday. However, Iris is frustrated when her mother admits she wants to use the party as a way to find a suitor for her. As Violet writes the party invitations, Iris specifically asks her not to send an invitation to a man named Emonn Snow, but Violet sends the invitation anyway. When Emonn appears at the party, Iris angrily retreats to her room. Violet then talks to Iris to figure out what's wrong, and Iris tells her that Emonn was her childhood crush, but he rejected her confession. The emotional pain caused by Emonn's rejection was what caused her to leave her hometown to become a doll. This causes Violet to realize that a love confession like Gilbert's must have required a great deal of courage. Violet then helps Iris write apology letters to all of the party guests, as well as her parents. Moved by the letter, Iris' parents allow her to continue working as a doll. On the way back to Leiden, Iris tells Violet that her parents named her after the flower of the same name, since she was born while they were in full bloom. This triggers a flashback in Violet, who remembers that Gilbert named her after the flower of the same name.
5	"You Write Letters that Bring People Together?"; Transliteration: "Hito o Musubu Tegami o Kaku no ka?" (Japanese: 人を結ぶ手紙を書くのか？)	Haruka Fujita; Shinpei Sawa	Takaaki Suzuki	February 8, 2018
On the request of the military, Violet is sent to the kingdom of Drossel in order to write a public love letter for its teenage princess, Charlotte, to Damian, the prince of the neighboring kingdom of Flugel. Violet's mission is crucial since Drossel and Flugel were previously enemies in the war and are arranging the marriage to cement the terms of the peace treaty. Despite Princess Charlotte being anxious about the wedding, Violet writes the love letter, and Prince Damian writes a letter back in response, but Princess Charlotte does not appear satisfied with it. Princess Charlotte later confides in Violet that she met and grew infatuated with Prince Damian when she first met him since he treated her as a person and not a potential wife or a mere queen consort. However, she is unsure of whether Prince Damian reciprocates her feelings or not, since she could tell the letter he returned contained no emotion in it. Violet then gets an idea and arranges with Damian's doll to have Princess Charlotte and Prince Damian both write their own letters to each other. This starts a heated but passionate correspondence between the two that entrances everybody in both kingdoms. The wedding goes as planned while Violet and Cattleya, who was Prince Damian's Doll, return to Leiden, though Cattleya notices Violet smiling. Upon returning, Violet encounters Gilbert's brother Dietfried, who expresses disbelief at how she became a doll and reminding her she had killed countless people, including many of his men.
6	"Somewhere, Under a Starry Sky"; Transliteration: "Doko ka no Hoshizora no Shita de" (Japanese: どこかの星空の下で)	Yoshiji Kigami	Tatsuhiko Urahata	February 15, 2018
Violet, along with a number of other dolls, arrive at the Shaher Observatory in order to help the scholars make copies of a number of rare books. Violet is paired with a young scholar named Leon, who initially dislikes her and dolls in general. However, he is impressed with how quickly she works, and begins to soften when he sees that she does not care about his background or upbringing as an orphan. He invites Violet to view Alley's Comet with him, which appears only once every two hundred years, and she accepts. While the two stargaze, Leon explains that his father was also a scholar at the observatory but had disappeared on an expedition. His mother then left home to search for him and never returned either, causing Leon to resent them and the concept of love. Violet then tells Leon that she has no known blood relatives, but is completely devoted to Gilbert. It is then that Leon realizes Violet is in love with Gilbert. The next morning, Violet prepares to leave now that her job is complete. Leon sees her off, and tells her that instead of waiting at the observatory for his parents to return, he will start traveling the world like Violet to go look for them. As Violet leaves, Leon wonders if he will ever encounter her again.
7	" (Note: No title was given for this episode.)"	Takuya Yamamura	Reiko Yoshida	February 22, 2018
Violet goes to assist a famous writer, Oscar Webster, in writing his next play. However, she arrives to find him a drunk recluse. Violet manages to convince Oscar to suspend his drinking while they work, and they begin writing the play. The play is about a girl named Olive who uses her power to summon magical sprites to defeat a beast, but in doing so sacrifices her ability and becomes stranded away from her home and father. Violet becomes curious about how the story will end, which Oscar has not decided upon yet. Violet then finds a parasol, triggering an angry outburst from Oscar. He then admits to Violet that he based Olive off of his daughter Olivia, who had died from illness, and he is trying to write the play as a way to cope with his grief over her loss. Violet then inspires Oscar with idea of Olive using her magical parasol to fly home. Oscar comes to terms with his daughter's death and thanks Violet. On the way home, Violet begins to suffer regrets over the people she had killed during the war, wondering how many happy endings she may have prevented. Upon returning to Leiden, Violet learns from Mrs. Evergarden that Gilbert is dead and confronts Hodgins. He admits that after their final mission, neither Gilbert nor his body could be found, but his dog tags were recovered, leading to the army presuming him dead. Violet remains in denial about Gilbert being dead and flees the post office in distress.
8	""	Shinpei Sawa	Reiko Yoshida	March 1, 2018
Violet heads over to the military headquarters to confront Dietfried about the truth of Gilbert's fate, and he confirms he is dead. Still in denial, Violet travels to Gilbert's mansion, where she finds his grave. Back at the post office, Hodgins leaves to go look for Violet. Violet then begins to recall her past with Gilbert, which started when Dietfried transferred her to his command as a child soldier. Despite his desire to raise Violet as a normal girl, Gilbert is forced by his superiors to put her on the front lines due to her astounding combat abilities. Violet proves to be instrumental in winning many key battles. During this time, Gilbert gave Violet her name and taught her how to read and write, and he eventually buys her a brooch as a gift. Some time later, Gilbert's unit is assigned to stage an attack on the enemy's headquarters, the success of which could mean the end of the war. Gilbert's unit suffers heavy casualties in the assault, but they are able to seize headquarters and signal the main force to attack. However, just as Gilbert sends the signal, he is shot by enemy soldiers, which horrifies Violet to her core.
9	"Violet Evergarden"; Transliteration: "Vaioretto Evāgāden" (Japanese: ヴァイオレット・エヴァーガーデン)	Yasuhiro Takemoto	Reiko Yoshida	March 8, 2018
Continuing Violet's flashback, she is resolved to carry a wounded Gilbert to safety, but is shot and hit with a grenade in process, resulting in the loss of both of her arms. Gilbert tells Violet to leave without him and finally tells her that he loves her, but she does not understand his words. Defeated, the enemy army bombs their own headquarters, and Gilbert sacrifices his life to push Violet to safety. In the present, Violet returns to the battle site to search for Gilbert. Hodgins then arrives and tells her that Gilbert had entrusted her care to him in case anything happened to Gilbert. Violet returns to the post office with Hodgins, but refuses to do any more ghostwriting work, worrying her coworkers. In her grief, Violet attempts to strangle herself to death but cannot go through with it. After helping Roland deliver letters and reading a letter sent to her by Erica and Iris, Violet comes to realize that the act of receiving a letter can bring someone joy. She returns to work, starting with ghostwriting a letter for Spencer, Luculia's brother. Violet returns to the post office and asks Hodgins if it is really okay for a person like her to live on. Hodgins responds that what she had done in the war can never be undone, but that also applies to all of the good deeds she has done as an Auto Memory Doll.
10	"A Loved One Will Always Watch Over You"; Transliteration: "Aisuru Hito wa Zutto Mimamotteiru" (Japanese: 愛する人はずっと見守っている)	Taichi Ogawa	Reiko Yoshida	March 15, 2018
Violet arrives at a mansion where a seven-year-old girl named Anne lives with her wealthy but sickly mother, Clara. Clara has hired Violet for seven days to write letters, but Anne is not told what the letters are about or who they are for. In addition, Anne is both mistrustful and fascinated by Violet, as she mistakenly believes her to be an actual living doll due to her prosthetic arms. Over the next week Anne comes to accept Violet but cannot accept being separated from her mother while the letters are written. After an angry outburst by Anne, Violet manages to calm Anne down and convince her not to blame herself for her mother's illness. With the intimate letters written finally, Violet leaves and eventually Clara dies. Afterwards, Anne begins receiving the letters from Clara written by Violet and eventually grows up to start a family of her own. Back at the post office, Violet reveals to her co-workers that the letters would be delivered to Anne on her subsequent birthdays for the next fifty years and is overcome with emotion at the thought of young Anne having to live all alone after her mother's untimely death.
11	"I Don't Want Anybody Else to Die!"; Transliteration: "Mō, Dare mo Shinasetakunai" (Japanese: もう、誰も死なせたくない)	Noriyuki Kitanohara	Tatsuhiko Urahata	March 22, 2018
The CH Postal Company receives a request for a doll from the neighboring country of Ctrigal, however the country is in a state of civil war between the warmongers and moderates. The request is from a soldier fighting on the front lines, but due to the danger Hodgins refuses the request. Violet overhears and travels to Ctrigal to find the client, Aidan Field. Aidan is fighting for the moderate faction, but his squad is annihilated by the enemy and he is gravely wounded. Violet arrives by parachute and rescues him. Realizing that he is mortally wounded, Aidan has Violet write farewell letters to his parents and his good childhood friend Maria, confessing his mutual love to her. With the letters complete, Violet comforts Aidan in his final moments as he pictures himself reuniting with Maria. Violet delivers the letters to Aidan's parents and Maria. Despite being saddened by Aidan's death, they thank Violet for delivering his final letters to them. Violet then breaks down in tears, apologizing for her inability to protect Aidan and help in him returning home safe and sound.
12	""	Shinpei Sawa; Takuya Yamamura	Takaaki Suzuki	March 29, 2018
Dietfried is ordered to protect a special envoy who will be traveling to a conference to sign a peace treaty formally ending the war. Meanwhile, a rebel anti-peace faction led by General Merkulov plans to ambush the envoy in order to stall the peace talks. Cattleya and Benedict accompany the envoy as they board a train from the city of Distery to travel to Gardarik. Meanwhile, Violet, returning from Ctrigal, notices a number of fires near the railroad. Upon learning that Cattleya is on the train, Violet decides to accompany them for protection. However, the anti-peace rebels have already infiltrated the train, and after it leaves the station they stage an attack. Violet attempts to fight back, but is eventually restrained due to her refusal to kill anybody. Dietfried rescues Violet, although he blames her for Gilbert's death and tells her that she has no reason to live. Violet counters that Gilbert's final order was for her to live on, and that she regrets not being able to protect Gilbert. At that moment, a rebel fires a rifle grenade at Dietfried, but Violet deflects the grenade with her prosthetic arms which begin to fall apart from the intensive effort.
13	"Auto Memory Doll and "I Love You""; Transliteration: "Jidō Shuki Ningyō to "Aishiteru"" (Japanese: 自動手記人形と「愛してる」)	Taichi Ishidate; Haruka Fujita	Reiko Yoshida	April 5, 2018
Violet continues to protect Dietfried, losing one of her arms in the process. However, the train approaches a bridge, and General Merkulov reveals that the bridge has been rigged to explode as a backup plan before leaping off the train. Violet and Benedict go to remove the bombs, and Violet sacrifices her other arm in the process. With the envoy safe, the party continues on to the peace talks, where Leidenschaftlich and Gadariki officially sign a peace treaty to end the war. Upon returning to Leiden, a popular event called the Air Show, where planes are loaded with letters that are released in the sky to rain down all over the country, is being revived due to the peace. While Violet's coworkers are writing letters to submit, Cattleya suggests she write a letter to Gilbert. However, Violet cannot find the words to say. She is then invited by Dietfried to visit his and Gilbert's mother. She assures Violet that she does not blame her for her youngest son's death, and that he lives on inside her heart, even if the memories are painful to recall. As Violet leaves, Dietfried notes that she has become fully independent thanks to Gilbert's kind and selfless dedications and teachings. Now inspired, Violet writes a letter to Gilbert for the Air Show. In it, she tells Gilbert how she has learned so much as an Auto Memory Doll, and that she plans to keep on living in the hopes that she will meet him again so she can tell him that she now understands the words "I love you". a little more. Through this, she finally comes to terms with Gilbert's loss, though choosing to believe he is still alive. The next day, Violet receives a new ghostwriting request and returns to work, introducing herself to her new client.
14 (OVA)	"Surely, Someday, You Will Understand Love"; Transliteration: "Kitto "Ai" o Shiru Hi ga Kuru no Darou" (Japanese: きっと"愛"を知る日が来るのだろう)	Taichi Ishidate; Haruka Fujita; Taichi Ogawa	Tatsuhiko Urahata	July 4, 2018
Between the events of episodes 4 and 5, Violet is hired by Irma Fellicha, a famous opera singer, to write a letter for her for a soldier missing in action. However, Irma's requests for the letter are both vague and complex, making it difficult for Violet to write a letter that can satisfy her despite numerous rewrites. Irma's conductor, Ardu, then reveals that Irma is in fact trying to use Violet to write the lyrics of the song she plans to use in her next opera play. Determined to complete the job, Violet decides to follow Irma to better understand her heart. Irma reveals to Violet that her boyfriend/fiance Hugo, Ardu's son, left to fight in the war but never returned. Though she understands Irma a little better, Violet is still not confident that she can write the letter she wants. Roland then takes Violet to an old military warehouse containing letters that were unable to be sent to soldiers that were missing or killed in action. Violet gains inspiration from reading these close friendship and love letters and writes a new one that moves both Irma and Ardu. Irma uses the letter as the basis for her song in her new opera play. As Irma sings, the song helps both her and Ardu move on from the loss of Hugo. The song is a great success, earning praise from the audience, and Ardu is confident that Violet will come to understand love someday.

=== Films ===
A spin-off film, Violet Evergarden: Eternity and the Auto Memory Doll (ヴァイオレット・エヴァーガーデン 外伝 - 永遠と自動手記人形, Vaioretto Evāgāden Gaiden Eien to Jidō Shuki Ningyō), premiered on August 3 at Germany's AnimagiC 2019 convention and in Japan on September 6, 2019. The film was directed by the show's series director Haruka Fujita. The film credits feature the names of those killed in the Kyoto Animation arson attack as a dedication to their work. Madman Entertainment licensed the film for distribution in Australia and New Zealand, premiering the film theatrically in Australia on December 5, 2019, and in New Zealand on December 12, 2019. Funimation screened the film theatrically in the United States in early 2020. Anime Limited licensed the film in the UK and Ireland, with a premiere scheduled on March 1, 2020, at the Glasgow Film Festival.

When the Violet Evergarden Gaiden light novel was released, the jacket band announced that a "new project" was in progress and that it will be a completely new work for the anime. In July 2018, it was announced at a special event for the series that the aforementioned new project would be a brand new anime film. The second spin-off film, Violet Evergarden: The Movie (劇場版 ヴァイオレット・エヴァーガーデン, Gekijō-ban Vaioretto Evāgāden), premiered on September 18, 2020. It was originally scheduled to premiere on January 10, 2020, but it was later delayed to April 24, 2020, due to the Kyoto Animation arson attack. It was subsequently delayed again to September 18, 2020, due to the COVID-19 pandemic. The official Kyoto Animation channel uploaded the first 10 minutes of the film on YouTube on October 8, 2020.

== Music ==
Violet Evergarden: Automemories

Soundtrack album by Evan Call
- Released: March 28, 2018
- Studios: Onkio Haus (Tokyo, Japan); Bunkamura Studio (Tokyo, Japan); Avaco Creative Studio (Tokyo, Japan)
- Length: 106:30
- Languages: English; Japanese
- Label: Lantis

Evan Call chronology
Wake Up, Girls! Soloevent 2018 (2018)	Violet Evergarden: Automemories (2018)	Lonely Queen's Liberation Party (2018)

Violet Evergarden soundtrack albums chronology
Violet Evergarden: Automemories (2018)	Violet Evergarden: Echo Through Eternity (2020)

The series' soundtrack titled Violet Evergarden: Automemories was composed by Evan Call and distributed by Bandai Namco Arts under their Lantis label on March 28, 2018. It contains 47 tracks and 6 vocal tracks featuring performances by Aira Yuuki, Minori Chihara, and True.

=== Track listing ===
All music/lyrics/tracks are composed by Evan Call, except where indicated.

Disc 1
No.	Title	Lyrics	Music	Length
1.	"Theme of Violet Evergarden"			2:17
2.	"A Doll's Beginning"			2:43
3.	"One Last Message"			3:10
4.	"Unspoken Words"			2:46
5.	"A Simple Mission"			2:17
6.	"Another Sunny Day"			2:08
7.	"The Voice in My Heart"			2:20
8.	"Rust"			2:51
9.	"In Remembrance"			2:41
10.	"Ink to Paper"			2:08
11.	"The Birth of a Legend"			2:13
12.	"To The Ends of Our World"			2:40
13.	"Back in Business"			2:02
14.	"A Place to Call Home"			2:12
15.	"An Admirable Doll"			2:11
16.	"Those Words You Spoke to Me"			2:13
17.	"Strangeling"			2:11
18.	"A Bit of Sass"			2:10
19.	"Each Memory a Message"			2:18
20.	"The Long Night"			2:39
21.	"Violet Snow for Orchestra"	Emi Nishida	Satomi Kawasaki	2:53
Total length:				51:03

Disc 2
No.	Title	Lyrics	Music	Artist	Length
1.	"Across the Violet Sky"				2:44
2.	"Wherever You Are, Wherever You May Be"				2:25
3.	"Never Coming Back"				2:24
4.	"Adamantine Dreams"				3:10
5.	"The Ultimate Price"				2:59
6.	"Inconsolable"				2:38
7.	"The Love That Binds Us"				3:55
8.	"Devoid of Hope"				2:29
9.	"Torment"				2:02
10.	"Fractured Heart"				2:29
11.	"Innocence"				2:02
12.	"Always Watching Over You"				2:24
13.	"Torn Apart at the Seams"				2:04
14.	"Interwined Fates"				2:03
15.	"The Stench of Fear and Hatred"				1:45
16.	"The Songstress Aria (Instrumental)"				1:05
17.	"The Storm"				2:12
18.	"Letters from Heaven"				2:23
19.	"What It Means To Love"				1:54
20.	"Violet's Letter"				2:13
21.	"Sincerely (Short Size)"	True	Shota Horie	Call, True	1:34
22.	"Michishirube (Short Size) (みちしるべ (Short Size))"	Minori Chihara	Daisuke Kikuta	Call, Chihara	1:32
23.	"Believe In... (Short Size)"	Aira Yuuki		Call, Yuuki	1:45
24.	"Violet Snow (Short Size)"	Nishida	Kawasaki	Call, Yuuki	0:32
25.	"The Songstress Aria"			Call, True	1:06
26.	"Letter (Short Size)"	True	Horie	Call, True	1:38
Total length:					55:27

== Reception ==
=== Light novel ===
Violet Evergarden won the grand prize in the fifth Kyoto Animation Award's novel category in 2014.

=== Anime ===
Year	Award	Category	Recipient	Result	Ref.
2018	IGN Awards	Best Anime Series	Violet Evergarden	Nominated	
2018	IGN Awards	Best Anime Episode	Episode 10 - "A Loved One Will Always Watch Over You"	Nominated	
2018	IGN Awards	Best Animation	Violet Evergarden	Won	
2019	3rd Crunchyroll Anime Awards	Anime of the Year	Violet Evergarden	Nominated	
2019	3rd Crunchyroll Anime Awards	Best Protagonist	Violet Evergarden	Nominated	
2019	3rd Crunchyroll Anime Awards	Best Animation	Violet Evergarden	Won	
2019	3rd Crunchyroll Anime Awards	Best Director	Taichi Ishidate	Nominated	
2019	3rd Crunchyroll Anime Awards	Best Character Design	Akiko Takase	Nominated	
2019	3rd Crunchyroll Anime Awards	Best Voice Artist Performance (English)	Erika Harlacher as Violet Evergarden	Nominated	

== See also ==
- Agents of the Four Seasons, another light novel series by Kana Akatsuki
