= Ben Pronsky =

American actor

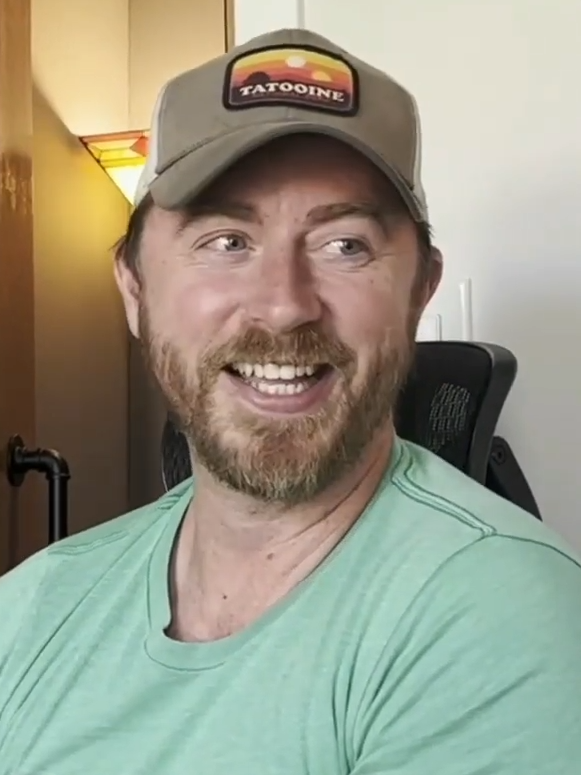
- Pronsky in 2022
- Occupation: Actor
- Years active: 1998–present

Ben Pronsky is an American voice and television actor. He is best known for voicing Venom in different animated Marvel Comics projects, Takashi Kamiyama from Cromartie High School, and William Wylde in Wylde Pak.

== Career ==
Pronsky studied regularly at the Larry Moss Studio and was founder and director of the Edgemar Film Festival in Santa Monica, California. He has also done voice-work for ADV Films, Bang Zoom! Entertainment and NYAV Post. He is best known as the voice of Takashi Kamiyama in Cromartie High School, Harklight in Aldnoah.Zero, Kurotabo in the Nura series, Mu Alexius in the Magi series, and Takehito Kumagami in Charlotte.

He currently resides in Los Angeles.

== Filmography ==
=== Animation ===
- Spidey and His Amazing Friends - Symbie
- The Loud House – Principal Marshall (in "Schooled!")
- Lego Marvel Spider-Man: Vexed By Venom (2019) – Venom, Security Guard, Delivery Guy
- Archibald's Next Big Thing – Stuart Munch
- Bob's Burgers – Additional voices
- Pucca: Love Recipe – Tobe, Ayo, Dandy
- Spider-Man – Venom, Eddie Brock, Knull, additional voices
- Transformers: Combiner Wars – Rodimus Prime
- Barbie Dreamhouse Adventures – Rufus, Henry Henricson, Pirate, Coach, Dog Trainer
- Stan Lee's Cosmic Crusaders (2016) – Lazer Lord
- Wylde Pak – William Wylde
- X-Men '97 – Garrison Kane, Graydon Creed

=== Live-action ===
- The Mentalist – Poker Playing Miner
- Creepshow 3 – John
- Ray – Southern Marine
- Warning: Parental Advisory – Senator's Aide
- Workshop – Lance
- Masters of the Universe – Karg

=== Video games ===
- Atelier Escha & Logy: Alchemists of the Dusk Sky – Reyfer
- Atelier Shallie: Alchemists of the Dusk Sea – Reyfer
- Akiba's Trip: Hellbound & Debriefed – Additional voices
- The Last of Us Part 2 – WLF Militia
- God of War Ragnarök – Additional voices
- Spider-Man (2018) – Additional voices
- Spider-Man: Miles Morales – Street Criminals
- Deadly Premonition 2: A Blessing in Disguise – Daniel Clarkson
- Death Stranding – Mules
- Death Stranding 2: On the Beach – Enemy NPC
- Destiny 2 – Nezarec, Final God of Pain
- Diablo IV – Creatures
- Disgaea 5: Alliance of Vengeance – Killia
- Dynasty Warriors 8 – Guan Xing (uncredited)
- Fortnite – Megalo Don
- Final Fantasy VII Remake – Butch
- Fire Emblem Echoes: Shadows of Valentia – Atlas
- Fire Emblem: Three Houses – Randolph
- Fire Emblem Warriors: Three Hopes – Randolph
- Oreca Battle – Additional voices
- Soul Sacrifice – Jack Frost, Leviathan
- Xenoblade Chronicles X – Additional voices
- D4: Dark Dreams Don't Die – David Young
- Genshin Impact – Oz
- Nier Replicant ver.1.22474487139... – Additional voices
- The Legend of Heroes: Trails of Cold Steel IV – Agate Crosner
- Call of Duty: Modern Warfare III - David "BBQ" Fischer
- Trails in the Sky 1st Chapter – Agate Crosner
- Trails in the Sky 2nd Chapter – Agate Crosner

=== English dubbing ===
==== Anime ====
- Charlotte – Takehito Kumagami
- Cromartie High School – Takashi Kamiyama
- Blue Exorcist - Mike
- Durarara!!x2 – Additional voices
- E's – Yuki Tokugawa
- Fate/Apocrypha – Saber of Black
- Ghost in the Shell: SAC_2045 – Takanobu Yamada
- Magi: The Labyrinth of Magic – Mu Alexius
- Miss Monochrome – Additional voices
- Mezzo – Friend A (Eps. 6–7)
- Mobile Suit Gundam SEED – Arnold Neumann (NYAV Post dub)
- Mobile Suit Gundam: Iron-Blooded Orphans – Isurugi Camich
- Nuku Nuku – Shimizaki
- Nura: Rise of the Yokai Clan – Kurotabo, Yoshidano Shosho Korefusa
- One Punch Man – Lightning Max
- Panyo Panyo Di Gi Charat – Ice, Prince
- Saiyuki – Demon 7 (Ep. 1), Li Touten (Ep. 41), Scar (Ep. 4), Wang
- Super Milk-chan – Hanage
- Sword Art Online – Additional voices
- Violet Evergarden – Benedict Bleu

==== Film ====
- Violet Evergarden: Eternity and the Auto Memory Doll – Benedict Bleu
- Violet Evergarden: The Movie – Benedict Bleu
- Your Name – Tsukasa Fujii
