= Aira Yūki =

- Also known as: Asuka Katō, FictionJunction Asuka
- Born: 結城アイラ; August 28, 1981 (age 45)
- Origin: Japan
- Genre: J-pop
- Occupation: Singer
- Years active: 2007–present
- Label: Lantis
- Formerly of: FictionJunction
- Spouse: Katsu (2019–present)
- Website: www.lantis.jp/artist/yuukiaira/

Aira Yūki (結城 アイラ, Yūki Aira; born August 28, 1981) is a female Japanese singer signed to the record label Lantis. She began her career in 2007 and since then has primarily sung songs that were used for theme music in anime. She released her debut album Reflection on July 2, 2008. Her second album Eternalize. was released on June 9, 2010.

== Career ==
=== 2007–2010 ===
Aira Yūki debuted with the release of her first single on April 25, 2007, "Colorless Wind" as the opening theme for the anime Sola. The single went on to enter the Oricon charts eleven times with a peak ranking at 44th place. Her second single was released on August 8, 2007, with the title track, "Zankoku yo Kibō to Nare" (残酷よ希望となれ) being the second opening theme for the anime Idolmaster Xenoglossia. The single charted four times with a peak ranking at number 49. Yūki released her third single "Sekai no Namida" (セカイノナミダ) on February 6, 2008, as the ending theme of True Tears. Like her second single, "Sekai no Namida" charted four times on the Oricon chart with the peak ranking at number 48. On July 2, 2008, she released her first album, Reflection. The album only entered the chart once, ranking at number 148.

There were no further releases from her until April 22, 2009, with her fourth single, "Blue sky, True Sky" being the first ending theme of the anime adaptation, Tears to Tiara. The single charted twice with a peak position at number 75. Yūki later joined 9 other female artistes from Lantis to perform at the Lantis Presents: twilight listening party vol.6 on July 25, 2009. "Weeping Alone", the second ending theme for Tears to Tiara was released on August 26, 2009. It charted once with the ranking at the 135th place. She released another single, "Dominant Space", on February 10, 2010, before releasing her second album. The single's title track was used as the second ending theme for the anime adaptation of Tatakau Shisho: The Book of Bantorra. The single only entered the Oricon charts once with a peak ranking at number 193. Her second album, Eternalize, was released on June 9, 2010. The album reached number 169.

Yūki released her seventh single "Lament (Yagate Yorokobi o)" (LAMENT〜やがて喜びを〜) on July 21, 2010. The title track was used as the first opening theme for the anime adaptation, The Legend of the Legendary Heroes. The single entered the Oricon charts five times and reached number 64. The single was an Oricon "Pick" on their 2010 Anime Theme Songs/Summer editorial. She also performed live at the first run of Lantis' "Rock'N Lan Carnival" together with Sayaka Sasaki, Yōsei Teikoku and Hironobu Kageyama. Yūki released her eighth single, "Hoshi o Motomete" (星を求めて; "Seeking for the Stars"), on October 27, 2010. The title track was the theme song for the OVA Armored Trooper Votoms Case;Irvine.

=== 2011–present ===
As of February 2011, Yūki is currently involved in a unit called FairyStory with Yuuka Nanri. The unit already announced an album that was slated to be released in spring 2011. The unit were scheduled to perform at the Chiba TV Anime Carnival on April 3, 2011. Due to the 2011 Tōhoku earthquake and tsunami, the event and her appearance with Yuuka Nanri as FairyStory at the Chiba TV Anime Carnival has been suspended. To aid victims, Yūki has also appeared in a charity event, "Ganbarou Nippon! Todoke Anison Tamashii" (頑張ろうNIPPON！届けアニソン魂) to raise funds for the victims of the disaster. She has been scheduled to appear at the charity live, "(Anime Song) Smile Anison de Dekiru koto o Shitai dake" ((AnimeSong)Smile アニソンで できることをしたいだけ) that would raise funds to be sent to the education board of the elementary schools in Miyagi Prefecture, Iwate Prefecture, Aomori Prefecture and Fukushima Prefecture as well as elementary schools in Niigata Prefecture, Yamagata Prefecture and Gunma Prefecture.

She performed the ending theme of the first two episodes of Space Battleship Yamato 2199 titled, "Hoshi ga Towa o Terashiteiru" (星が永遠を照らしている). On the July 17, 2012, broadcast of NozaP・Matsunaga Maho no Live Dog!, she announced her previous work as FictionJunction Asuka, who provided the vocals for "Everlasting Song", an insert song used in the anime Elemental Gelade. Prior to her debut as Aira Yūki, she was signed on to Zazzy, one of Being's independent label. She sang jazz covers of songs by Seiko Matsuda, Shikao Suga, Joni Mitchell, Carole King on iTunes Japan as "Asuka Katō" (かとうあすか, Katō Asuka). At the end of 2007, her songs, "Sweet Memories" and "It's Too Late" were picked as the best songs for the Jazz category for both Japanese and Western songs. Under Asuka Katō, she had released seven singles and one album.

Her ninth single, "Kanashimi wa Dare no Negai demo Nai" (悲しみは誰の願いでもない; "Sadness isn't Anyone's Desire") is one of the two ending themes for the second season of Horizon in the Middle of Nowhere, and was released on August 8, 2012. Yūki's third album For My Dear... was released on November 21, 2012. In July 2013, it was announced that she would perform the insert song and ending theme of Mobile Suit Gundam Age: Memory of Eden called "Mirai no Moyō" (未来の模様). The song was later released on iTunes on July 26. Yūki also performed the ending theme of the anime adaption of BlazBlue called "Reincarnation Blue". Yūki will be performing the ending theme of the 2014 anime television series Broken Blade. The song is titled "Itoshiki Aragai yo, Michibike Hikari e" (愛しき抗いよ、導け光へ) and like "Reincarnation Blue", she wrote the lyrics for the song as well.

== Discography ==
=== Singles ===
1. "Colorless Wind", released April 25, 2007
2. "Zankoku yo Kibō to Nare" (残酷よ希望となれ), released August 8, 2007
3. "Sekai no Namida" (セカイノナミダ), released February 6, 2008
4. "Blue sky, True sky", released April 22, 2009
5. "Weeping Alone", released August 26, 2009
6. "Dominant Space", released February 10, 2010
7. "Lament (Yagate Yorokobi o)" (LAMENT〜やがて喜びを〜), released July 21, 2010
8. "Hoshi o Motomete" (星を求めて; "Seeking for the Stars"), released on October 27, 2010
9. "Kanashimi wa Dare no Negai demo Nai" (悲しみは誰の願いでもない; "Sadness isn't Anyone's Desire"), released on August 8, 2012
10. "Reincarnation Blue", released on November 27, 2013
11. "Itoshiki Aragai yo, Michibike Hikari e" (愛しき抗いよ、導け光へ), released on May 28, 2014
12. "Pale Moon ga Yureteru" (ペールムーンがゆれてる), released on March 1, 2017
13. "Donna Hoshizora Yori mo, Donna Omoide Yori mo" (どんな星空よりも、どんな思い出よりも 結城 アイラ), released on November 22, 2017

=== Albums ===
1. Reflection, released July 2, 2008
2. Eternalize., released on June 9, 2010
3. For My Dear..., released on November 21, 2012

=== Digital-only releases ===
1. "Mirai no Moyō" (未来の模様), released July 27, 2013

=== Compilations ===
- Oratorio, released August 8, 2007
- Metamorphoses, released March 12, 2008
- Tears for truth: True Tears Image Song Collection, released April 16, 2008
- Shina Dark: Kuroki Tsuki no Ō to Sōheki no Himegimi Vocal Album, released November 26, 2008
- Brilliant World, released January 7, 2009
- Tears to Tiara Prologue Sound Track "origo cunctarum rerum", released March 4, 2009
- Sora o Miageru Shōjo no Hitomi ni Utsuru Sekai Inspired Album, released March 25, 2009
- Gundam Tribute from Lantis, released December 9, 2009
- Densetsu no Yūsha no Densetsu no Radio Omatome'ban 1, released September 22, 2010
- Mojūtsukai to Ōji-sama Character Song Album, released October 20, 2010
- Aijō Kakyoku, released October 27, 2010
- Fortissimo Songs, released October 27, 2010
- Mojūtsukai to Ōji-sama & Mojūtsukai to Ōji-sama: Snow Bride Shudai Kashū, released February 23, 2011
- Yunosagi Relations, released June 8, 2011
- Memories: The Last Leaf, released on November 23, 2011
- Hoshi ga Towa o Terashiteiru/Utsukushii Hoshi o Shiru Mono yo, released on June 27, 2012

== Appearances ==
=== Radio ===
- Yūka to Aira no Radio Hako'iri Hime (侑香とアイラのRadioはこいり姫), Nippon Cultural Broadcast's Chou!A+G since October 2010 Co-hosted with Yuuka Nanri. The radio show ended on April 2, 2011, with a total of 26 episodes.
- Tokyo→Niigata Music Convoy, since October 2011 on every Thursday. The radio show ended on March 28, 2013.
- Aira to Chika no Okinimesu mama, since April 6, 2013, on every Saturday.

=== TV animation ===
- Toaru Majutsu no Index II – Amakusa Girl (episode 14)

=== Games ===
- Atelier Meruru: Alchemist of Arland 3 – Hom

=== Drama CDs ===
- Anikoi: anime mitaina koi shitai – Female student
- Vomic – Katekyō Hitman Reborn! – Adelheid Suzuki
- Strobe Edge – Tamaki

=== Miscellaneous ===
- Sister Quest II – Sereia
- Sengoku Otome 2 – Saito Murasame
- Sengoku Otome 3 – Hoozuki
