= Miho Karasawa =

Japanese singer (born 1983)

Miho Karasawa 唐沢 美帆
- Also known as: True
- Born: July 15, 1983 (age 43); Tokyo, Japan
- Genres: J-Pop
- Occupations: Singer, lyricist
- Years active: 2000–present
- Label: Lantis
- Website: true-singer.com

Miho Karasawa (唐沢 美帆, Karasawa Miho; born July 15, 1983) is a Japanese singer and lyricist from Tokyo who was previously signed to Horipro and is currently signed to Lantis. She made her debut in 2000 with the release of the song "Anytime, Anywhere", before performing theme songs for multiple television series. Since 2014, she has performed for anime series under the stage name True (stylized as TRUE). She has performed theme songs for Buddy Complex, Gargantia on the Verdurous Planet, Maria the Virgin Witch, Sound! Euphonium, and Violet Evergarden, among others.

== Biography ==
Karasawa was born in Tokyo on July 15, 1983. She had an interest in anime music, citing the music careers of voice actors Megumi Hayashibara and Hekiru Shiina as inspirations. She started her entertainment career as a gravure model, appearing in magazines, photobooks, and home video releases. She released a gravure video titled Dolce in 1999. That same year, she became a member of the limited-time group Nitro, a group consisting of four gravure idols; they released the song "Calling", which was used as the theme song to the film You're Under Arrest: The Movie.

Karasawa launched a solo music career in 2000, releasing her first single "Anytime, Anywhere". In 2001, she released the single "Way to Love", the title song of which was used in the television drama Love Revolution; the single peaked at number 10 on the Oricon weekly charts. She released her first solo album Sparkle in 2002. She would continue to perform for televisions throughout the decade, including a remixed version of "Way to Love" in 2009. She also became active as a stage actress, appearing in plays such as a production of Miss Saigon. In 2011, she joined the agency Scoop Music and began writing lyrics for other musicians.

In 2014, Karasawa announced that she would be leaving Horipro, the agency she had been with since her debut. Later that year, she began activities as an anison artist under the music label Lantis, using the stage name True for anime-related activities. In an interview, she stated that the name was inspired by a Lantis producer, who said that being in Lantis allowed her to express who she truly was. It was also inspired by her belief that her writing songs for anime represented her "true" self, given her long-time love for anime. Her first anime song was "Unisonia", which was used as the opening theme to the television series Buddy Complex. Her next anime song was "Hajimari no Tsubasa" (はじまりの翼), which was used as the opening theme to the original video animation Gargantia on the Verdurous Planet: Far Beyond The Voyage. Joy Heart, her first album under the name True, was released in December 23, 2015.

In 2015, Karasawa released the song "Dream Solister", which was used as the opening theme to the anime television series Sound! Euphonium. She would continue performing songs for the series, with the 2016 song "Soundscape" used as the second season's opening theme, and the 2024 song "ReCoda" used as the third season's opening theme.

In 2018, Karasawa released the single "Sincerely", the title song being used as the opening theme to the anime series Violet Evergarden. She also released the single "Another colony", the title song being used as the ending theme to the anime series That Time I Got Reincarnated as a Slime. She would later perform the song "Storyteller", which was used as the opening theme for the series' second season in 2021. In April 2024, she left Scoop Music to join Cat Entertainment. She released a compilation album titled True the Best in February 2025.

== Style and production ==
In her early career, Karasawa hired her own musicians and rehearsal space to produce her own recordings.

Karasawa uses a variety of methods during her songwriting, including singing into her iPhone, recording notes on her pc, and drawing inspiration from photos and illustrations. Karasawa states that she often creates songs for herself, but will offer them to other artists if she feels their styles will create better results.

== Discography ==
=== Single ===
	Release date	Title	Note(s)
As Miho Karasawa
1	August 20, 2000	"Anytime, Anywhere"	
2	October 18, 2000	"0°C ~Stay with Me~"	
3	May 30, 2001	"Way to Love"	Love Revolution insert song
4	September 5, 2001	"Live" (ライヴ, Raibu)	Discovery of the World's Mysteries ED
5	February 6, 2002	"Endless Harmony"	Nurseman ED
6	September 4, 2002	"Affection"	
7	January 21, 2004	"Cloudy"	If ~Moshimo Taikan Variety~ January–March ED
8	November 17, 2004	"Kimi no Kakera" (君のかけら)	
As TRUE
1	February 26, 2014	"UNISONIA"	Buddy Complex OP
2	October 8, 2014	"Hajimari no Tsubasa/Twin Bird" (はじまりの翼 / TWIN BIRD)	Suisei no Gargantia ~Meguru Kōro, Haruka~ OP and Buddy Complex Kanketsu-hen: Ano Sora ni Kaeru Mirai de insert song respectively
3	February 11, 2015	"Ailes"	Maria the Virgin Witch ED
4	April 22, 2015	"Dream Solister"	Sound! Euphonium OP
5	October 14, 2015	"Dear Answer"	Beautiful Bones: Sakurako's Investigation OP
6	February 10, 2016	"Hiryō no Kishi (飛竜の騎士)	Undefeated Bahamut Chronicle OP
7	February 24, 2016	"Steel -Tekketsu no Kizuna (STEEL-鉄血の絆-)	Mobile Suit Gundam: Iron-Blooded Orphans ED
8	July 27, 2016	"Divine Spell"	Regalia: The Three Sacred Stars OP
9	October 12, 2016	"Soundscape" (サウンドスケープ)	Sound! Euphonium 2 OP
10	May 24, 2017	"From" (フロム, Furomu)	WorldEnd ED
11	July 26, 2017	"Butterfly Effector"	Hina Logi ~from Luck & Logic~ OP
12	January 31, 2018	"Sincerely"	Violet Evergarden OP
13	March 28, 2018	"A.I.C.O."	A.I.C.O. -Incarnation- OP
14	November 7, 2018	"Another colony"	That Time I Got Reincarnated as a Slime ED
15	April 17, 2019	"Blast!"	Sound! Euphonium: The Movie – Our Promise: A Brand New Day ED
16	September 16, 2020	"WILL"	Violet Evergarden: The Movie ED
17	January 13, 2021	"Storyteller"	That Time I Got Reincarnated as a Slime 2 OP
18	January 26, 2022	"Happy Encount"	In the Land of Leadale OP
19	April 24, 2024	"ReCoda"	Sound! Euphonium 3 OP
