= List of Angels of Death manga chapters =

Angels of Death is a manga series written by Makoto Sanada and illustrated by Kudan Nazuka, based on a video game of the same name. It began serialization in Media Factory's Monthly Comic Gene magazine in January 2016. A prequel to the video game, Angels of Death Episode.0, also written by Sanada and illustrated by Nazuka, began serialization digitally in Kadokawa's Gene Pixiv on March 3, 2017. A two-volume four-panel manga series titled Satsuten!, written by Sanada and illustrated by Negiyan, was serialized in Comic Gene from February 2017 to January 2018.

== Angels of Death ==
No.	Original release date	Original ISBN	English release date	English ISBN
1	January 27, 2016	978-4-04-067893-1	December 19, 2017	978-0-31-644176-6
Chapter 1: "The Girl Who Lost Her Memory"; Chapter 2: "Ray's Physician"; Chapter 3: "Chance Meeting"; Chapter 4: "Destroyer"
13-year-old Rachel Gardner wakes up on Floor B7 of a hospital with only the memory of a murder that she witnessed prior, resulting in her being sent for counselling. While searching for her parents, a announcement refers to her as a 'sacrifice', opening an elevator. Unaware that this building is the setting for a killing game on the various floors, Rachel begins to make her way up, where she encounters serial killer Isaac "Zack" Foster on B6 and her counsellor Daniel "Danny" Dickens on B5. Although Danny appears friendly at first glance, he soon reveals a morbid interest in her blue eyes, cornering her in an attempt to help her regain that once blank, dead look in her eyes. Frightened and panicked, Rachel regains her memories of the murder details, realising her parents are dead. Zack then reappears and kills Danny, but loses interest in her lack of emotions. As the broadcast designates Zack as a sacrifice along with Rachel for having killed someone not on his floor, the two strike a deal where Zack can use her intelligence to escape the building, and in return will kill her upon leaving.
2	June 27, 2016	978-4-04-068284-6	April 10, 2018	978-0-31-644178-0
Chapter 5: "My Aesthetics"; Chapter 6: "Swear to God"; Chapter 7: "The Graveyard and the Boy"; Chapter 8: "All Mine"
Zack and Rachel begin to make their way up the various floors. At B4, they come across a huge graveyard and a network of dark rooms filled with files about the various people that came to the building as 'sacrifices', all of whom were ominously killed. As Rachel explores the floor for clues to the next elevator, Zack encounters the floor master: a young boy with a pumpkin mask named Edward "Eddie" Mason, who has fallen for Rachel at first sight and is determined to kill her to bury her in one of his graves. At first, Rachel contemplates Eddie's offer but ultimately chooses Zack when he swears to God on their oath. Using the darkness to his advantage, Eddie attempts to kill the two of them until Rachel turns on the light, allowing Zack to kill him. He is buried in the grave meant for Rachel.
3	December 26, 2016	978-4-04-068809-1	June 5, 2018	978-1-97-532623-4
Chapter 9: "Crime and Punishment"; Chapter 10: "Shacks and the Murderer"; Chapter 11: "If I Die Here"; Chapter 12: "Monster"
Zack decides to nickname Rachel "Ray" as they head up the elevator to B3, a prison-cum-torture-chamber. The floor master, a sadomasochistic woman named Catherine "Cathy" Ward, forces them to go through stages of torture to proceed, intending to uncover their crimes and condemn them as sinners. In the first torture, Zack sits on an electric chair without him knowing, causing him to be electrocuted by Cathy until Ray stops the mechanism. In the second torture, they are trapped in a room filled with poisonous gas. Even though Ray has solved the riddle and found the keycard, Zack broke it by accident. As Cathy increase the poison's dose, Ray resorts to explode the whole room using batteries and wires available to create spark since the gas is flammable while she and Zack hides in a safe. Escaping the room, Ray and Zack takes a rest from the aftereffect of the gas, in which Zack begins to dream of his childhood.
4	February 27, 2017	978-4-04-069033-9	August 21, 2018	978-1-97-535401-5
Chapter 13: "Farewell"; Chapter 14: "Poison or Medicine"; Chapter 15: "Just Yet"; Chapter 16: "In the Firing Squad Execution Chamber"
Zack recalls his time at an illegal orphanage where the caretakers neglected the children to the point of death. There, he was made a tool of labour, especially in burying the bodies. After watching a slasher horror movie though, he was inspired to kill the couple and went on a killing spree. Waking up, Cathy offers Zack and Ray to stay in eternal imprisonment as her playthings, which reminds Zack of his childhood that causes him to have a brief conflict with Ray. At the fourth obstacle that requires two serums, one vitamin and one drug, to be injected, Zack decides to inject both serums into himself. The drug triggers Zack's past and his bloodlust, causing him to nearly kill Ray until she calms him down by asking what he truly wants. Having vowed to himself to never lie, Zack pleads Ray not let him kill her until they fulfil their promise. Ray run with Zack in tow until they ends up in a room where gatling guns are pointed at them. Cathy reveals herself and offers Ray a gun to shoot Zack, but Ray refuses to follow Cathy's order with reasoning neither she nor Zack are tools like she make them to be. This delights Zack who claims to be so happy that he cuts his own stomach open.
5	July 27, 2017	978-4-04-069244-9	November 13, 2018	978-1-97-535397-1
Chapter 17: "Bang!"; Chapter 18: "Blackout"; Chapter 19: "Resolution"; Chapter 20: "Her Vow"; Chapter 21: "The Rose's Smile"; Chapter 22: "Her First"
Enraged by Zack's apparent suicide, Cathy moves to kill Ray instead until Zack is revealed to be alive. Before Cathy could go further, Ray takes her off guard by shooting her with a gun she hid in her bag, severely wounding Cathy, which gives Zack the opportunity to kill Cathy. When they arrives at B2, Zack faints due to his bleeding, prompting Ray to go look for medicine. The story then changes to Cathy's past. She was a daughter of a pair of doctors who was popular in her school until they died due to accident. Seeing Cathy was unaffected by their death, other students started bullying her, except a girl named Lucy who was her loyal admirer to the point she would murder the ones whom Cathy deems as sinners. The two of them eventually become prison wardens and constantly torture the prisoners to force them confess their sins until they died. This ended when Cathy quits her job as prison warden after receiving invitation from a reverend, killing Lucy whom she deemed as a sinner as well for all the prisoners she had killed.
6	December 27, 2017	978-4-04-069571-6	April 30, 2019	978-1-97-530380-8
Chapter 23: "Place of Repentance"; Chapter 24: "Trials"; Chapter 25: "The Vanished Corpse"; Chapter 26: "The Knife Left Behind"
Ray meets a reverend Abraham Gray who tells her she can get medicine at Danny's floor and he can take her there only if she'll take his trial. After convincing Zack she will return alive, Rachel finds herself constantly collapses and seemingly hallucinates only to find herself already at B5, but finds the medicines are gone. Meanwhile, Danny, who had faked his death, is about to kill Zack, but Zack awakes right before Danny could. He offers Zack medicine in exchange for Ray's eyes, but Zack refuses. Knowing he is no match for Zack even at the latter's injured state, Danny leaves. Following Zack's request, Ray returns to B6 where she first met Zack and brings him his knife. When she returns to B2, however, Ray finds Zack is missing.
7	April 27, 2018	978-4-04-069840-3	July 23, 2019	978-1-97-530387-7
Chapter 27: "Snake's Shadow"; Chapter 28: "Why I Want to be Killed"; Chapter 29: "Witch"; Chapter 30: "The Trial Begins"
Grey accused Ray for being a witch who only follows her selfishness that causes misfortunes to happen to Zack and the other floor masters, which unnerves Ray. She then finds Zack in the next room, trying to follow Danny. Despite his injury, Zack insists that they continue their way, but Zack's bleeding eventually worsens. Seeing Ray willing to endanger herself to save him despite their oath, Zack points out Ray's self-contradiction. Ray admits that she is confused as to why she only wants Zack to kill her but can only think it's an oath to God. Zack then admits while he indeed made the oath, he thinks that God doesn't exist in the world. Hearing this, Ray also comes into realization that she doesn't want Zack to kill her just because he swore to God but doesn't know the reason why, further distressing her. As Zack once again falls asleep from his injury, Ray once again tries to look for medicine, meeting Gray once more who reveals Danny has given him some. However, Gray refuses to give it to Ray and takes her to a courtroom where the supposedly dead Eddie and Cathy reappears together with Danny to judge her.
8	September 27, 2018	978-4-04-065123-1	November 12, 2019	978-1-97-533167-2
Chapter 31: "My God"; Chapter 32: "Awakening"; Chapter 33: "Lie"; Chapter 34: "Bread and Knife"
Grey deems Ray guilty for being a witch and sentenced her to be burn at stake while telling her that her so-called God does not exist and he is the God in the entire building. Refusing to accept Gray's words, Ray remembers' Zack's knife in her possession and recalls her relationship with him, convincing herself that Zack is her God. Injuring herself with the knife, Ray awakes from the hallucination and threatens Gray to give her the medicine. After giving the medicine to Ray, Gray warns her that God doesn't desire impure and dishonest being. Ray returns to Zack's side and tends his injury before finally they proceeds to Floor B1. Upon arriving at B1 that resembles an inside of a house, Ray panics and tells Zack not to open the door to the room in front of them. The story then changes to Zack's past. After murdering his abusive caretakers, Zack runs away from the orphanage and kills a passerby to use her car to cover from the rain. In the morning, he is found by a blind old man who takes him to his house and allows Zack to stay without asking anything in return. Unable to comprehend the old man's kindness, Zack killed again and tells the whole thing to the old man in hope of scaring him so Zack can kill him, but the old man merely asks what Zack is planning to do from now on, further confusing Zack. The next morning, the old man decides to spend the rest of his life to care for Zack. Unfortunately, just as he decided this, he was killed by thugs for his wallet. Upon finding out the old man's death, Zack kills his murderers, coming into conclusion that he is a monster and will bring despair to those who shows happiness.
9	March 27, 2019	978-4-04-065590-1	January 21, 2020	978-1-97-533296-9
Chapter 35: "Tear"; Chapter 36: "A Childish Trap"; Chapter 37: "God's Eyes"; Chapter 38: "Family"; Chapter 39: "Trump Card"
10	September 27, 2019	978-4-04-064043-3	August 18, 2020	978-1-97-531510-8
Chapter 40: "Ideal"; Chapter 41: ""My" God"; Chapter 42: "False Light"; Chapter 43: "Death Ungranted"; Chapter 44: "Twin Vows"
11	March 27, 2020	978-4-04-064496-7	January 19, 2021	978-1-97-531861-1
Chapter 45: "The Two Top Floors"; Chapter 46: "Heart"; Chapter 47: "Collapse"; Chapter 48: "Purgatory"; Chapter 49: "Once We're Out"
12	October 27, 2020	978-4-04-064976-4	October 12, 2021	978-1-97-533566-3
Chapter 50: "Human"; Chapter 51: "Heading Out"; Chapter 52: "Last Judgement"; Chapter 53: "The Distant Moon"; Chapter 54: "Once in a Blue Moon"

== Satsuten! ==
No.	Original release date	Original ISBN	English release date	English ISBN
1	February 27, 2017	978-4-04-068813-8	—	—
Chapter 1; Chapter 2; Chapter 3; Chapter 4; Chapter 5; Chapter 6; Chapter 7; Chapter 8; Chapter 9; Chapter 10; Chapter 11
2	January 27, 2018	978-4-04-069245-6	—	—
Chapter 12; Chapter 13; Chapter 14; Chapter 15; Chapter 16; Chapter 17; Chapter 18; Chapter 19; Chapter 20; Chapter 21; Chapter 22
3	February 27, 2019	978-4-04-065464-5	—	—
Chapter 23; Chapter 24; Chapter 25; Chapter 26; Chapter 27; Chapter 28; Chapter 29; Chapter 30; Chapter 31; Chapter 32; Chapter 33; Chapter 34
4	April 27, 2020	978-4-04-064689-3	—	—
Chapter 35; Chapter 36; Chapter 37; Chapter 38; Chapter 39; Chapter 40; Chapter 41; Chapter 42; Chapter 43; Chapter 44; Chapter 45
5	March 27, 2021	978-4-04-680279-8	—	—
Chapter 46; Chapter 47; Chapter 48; Chapter 49; Chapter 50; Chapter 51; Chapter 52; Chapter 53; Chapter 54; Chapter 55; Chapter 56; Chapter 57; Chapter 58

== Episode.0 ==
No.	Original release date	Original ISBN	English release date	English ISBN
1	July 27, 2017	978-4-04-069245-6	March 19, 2019	978-1-9753-0379-2
Chapter 0: "Interests"; Chapter 1: "The Priest"; Chapter 2: "In a Cruel World"; Chapter 3: "Angel"
As a prison counselor, Daniel Dickens is no stranger to odd encounters with inmates. But when a particularly confident prisoner enters his office claiming that his session with a priest left him "fullfilled", Danny, who has led an unsatisfying life, has to know more. During their meeting, Danny finds there's little he can hide from this mysterious clergyman, and when an offer comes his way, he'll have to make a decision that will change his life forever.
2	February 26, 2018	978-4-04-069710-9	May 21, 2019	978-1-9753-0398-3
Chapter 4: "The Twins' Furniture Store"; Chapter 5: "One Answer"; Chapter 6: "The Blood-Soaked Lady"; Chapter 7: "Roses and Buds"
Danny has taken Gray up on his offer to become an "angel" and is now searching for others to join the cause. He soon meets a pair of twins who run a peculiar furniture store, and the materials they use seem a bit too lifelike...
3	March 28, 2019	978-4-04-065591-8	November 26, 2019	978-1-9753-5951-5
Chapter 8: "Her First"; Chapter 9: "Eyeball Killer"; Chapter 10: "Empty Eyes"; Chapter 11: "Deprive"; Chapter 12: "The Gravekeeper and the Furniture Maker"
Pastor Gray has prepared an underground sanctuary for his angels, in which they are free to pursue their deepest, darkest desires. But as they begin to populate the facility, news of a homocidal maniac called the Eyeball killer arrive, and Danny decides to investigate...
4	May 27, 2021	978-4-0406-4353-3	August 23, 2022	978-1-9753-1401-9
Chapter 13: "Violator"; Chapter 14: "Dance of Death 1"; Chapter 15: "Dance of Death 2"; Chapter 16: "God's Child 1"; Chapter 17: "God's Child 2"
When a mysterious grave robber defiles Eddie's graves, Eddie instantly suspects Shin, who seems to be the most likely culprit. However, after Shin shows Eddie his "art", his innocence is all but assured, and the two form a temporary alliance to track down the real thief. They don't have to wait long, though, as their target soon returns to the scene of the crime! All that's left is to decide how they'll dispose of this pest, and Shin's got some ideas...
5	December 27, 2021	978-4-0468-0883-7	January 17, 2023	978-1-9753-5281-3
Chapter 18: "My Devil"; Chapter 19: "Transient"; Chapter 20: "Completion"; Chapter 21: "Ars Longa, Vita Brevis"; Chapter 22: "The Laughing Reaper"
After Gray invites Deborah to tour his building, Deborah rubs more than a few of his "angels" the wrong way. But she doesn't come alone — she's got a devil of her own, and if he plays his cards right, he just might carve out a spot for himself in Gray's twisted experiment. Deborah, on the other hand, has bigger plans, and she and Gray don't quite see eye to eye...
6	September 26, 2022	978-4-0468-1448-7	October 17, 2023	978-1-9753-7315-3
Chapter 23: "Displeasing eyes"; Chapter 24: "Collision"; Chapter 25: "Irrational Bloodlust"; Chapter 26: "Inhuman"; Chapter 27: "Admiration"; Chapter 28: "Influence"
Upon losing one of his "angels" to a vicious killer prowling the streets, Gray decides to pay a visit to the so-called Laughing Reaper...and invite him to take part in his project. But this newcomer to B6 is anything but typical, and as much as the residents of the other floors want to approach their suspicious coworker, he makes it clear he's here to kill, not talk. And when Daniel finds a new companion of his own, he thinks she might just change everything...
7	April 27, 2023	978-4-0468-2157-7	May 21, 2024	978-1-9753-8059-5
Chapter 29: "Gods Teachings"; Chapter 30: "Faith"; Chapter 31: "The Bible"; Final Chapter: "Under the fake blue moon"
After much effort, Daniel has obtained the one thing he's wished for all his life — a girl with the empty, soulless eyes he loves. Rachel Gardner, the newest "angel" on B1, merely watches from her floor riddled with lethal traps, as the building's sacrifices meet their bloody ends time and again. But with the arrival of an elderly blind woman, the wheels of fate are set in motion...Witness the beginning of the story at last with this final installment of the "Angels of Death" prequel!

== Art Gallery ==
No.	Original release date	Original ISBN	English release date	English ISBN
1	June 27, 2018	978-4-04-069982-0	—	—
2	May 31, 2021	978-4-04-680046-6	—	—
