= Isaac Foster =

Isaac Foster may refer to:

- Isaac Foster (footballer) (1881-1950), English footballer, see List of Bury F.C. players (1–24 appearances)
- Isaac Foster, fictional characeter in Angels of Death (video game)
