= Phantom Tales of the Night =

Japanese manga series

- Cover of the first volume

ばけもの夜話づくし (Bakemono no Yawadukushi)
- Genre: Dark fantasy
- Manga
- Written by: Matsuri
- Published by: Media Factory; Kadokawa Shoten
- English publisher: NA: Yen Press
- Magazine: Monthly Comic Gene (July 15, 2016–May 15, 2019); Comic Newtype (June 25, 2019–November 22, 2022)
- Original run: July 15, 2016 – November 22, 2022
- Volumes: 12

Phantom Tales of the Night (Japanese: ばけもの夜話づくし, Hepburn: Bakemono no Yawadukushi) is a Japanese manga series written and illustrated by Matsuri. It was serialized in Media Factory's Monthly Comic Gene magazine from July 2016 to May 2019, before moving to Kadokawa Shoten's Comic Newtype website in June 2019, where it was serialized until November 2022. As of January 2023, the series' individual chapters have been collected into twelve volumes.

== Media ==
=== Manga ===
Written and illustrated by Matsuri, the series began serialization in Media Factory's Monthly Comic Gene magazine on July 15, 2016. The series ended serialization in Monthly Comic Gene on May 15, 2019; the series resumed serialization in Kadokawa Shoten's Comic Newtype website on June 25, 2019. The series completed its serialization in Comic Newtype on November 22, 2022. As of January 2023, the series' individual chapters have been collected into twelve tankōbon volumes.

In February 2019, Yen Press announced that they licensed the series for English publication.

==== Volume list ====
No.	Original release date	Original ISBN	English release date	English ISBN
1	December 26, 2016	978-4-04-068812-1	September 3, 2019	978-1-97-538521-7
2	June 27, 2017	978-4-04-069243-2	November 26, 2019	978-1-97-530586-4
3	December 27, 2017	978-4-04-069569-3	February 25, 2020	978-1-97-530589-5
4	July 27, 2018	978-4-04-069898-4	June 23, 2020	978-1-97-530592-5
5	January 26, 2019	978-4-04-065396-9	August 18, 2020	978-1-97-531547-4
6	August 27, 2019	978-4-04-064050-1	December 1, 2020	978-1-97-531745-4
7	June 27, 2020	978-4-04-064401-1	June 8, 2021	978-1-97-532421-6
8	January 27, 2021	978-4-04-680141-8	March 29, 2022	978-1-97-533631-8
9	July 28, 2021	978-4-04-680675-8	August 9, 2022	978-1-97-534528-0
10	January 27, 2022	978-4-04-680985-8	December 13, 2022	978-1-97-535267-7
11	July 26, 2022	978-4-04-681504-0	June 20, 2023	978-1-97-536806-7
12	January 26, 2023	978-4-04-682012-9	January 23, 2024	978-1-97-537960-5

=== Drama CD ===
A drama CD adaptation was released in the August 2018 issue of Monthly Comic Gene on July 14, 2018. It starred Takuma Nagatsuka, Toshiki Masuda, and Hiroki Yasumoto.

== Reception ==
Rebecca Silverman and Faye Hopper from Anime News Network compared the story to that of Hell Girl and xxxHolic. Silverman and Hopper both praised the artwork, but felt the story failed to explain some things they thought it should have explained. Kate O'Neil from The Fandom Post liked the story and especially liked the artwork, comparing it to Pet Shop of Horrors and xxxHolic.
