= Rusted Armors =

Japanese mixed-media project

- Cover of Rusted Armors volume 1 by Media Factory

錆色のアーマ (Sabiiro no Āma)
- Manga
- Illustrated by: hagi
- Published by: Media Factory
- Magazine: Monthly Comic Gene
- Original run: January 15, 2019 – October 15, 2019
- Volumes: 2
- Manga

Rusted Armors: Daybreak
- Illustrated by: Kairi Shimotsuki
- Published by: Media Factory
- Magazine: Monthly Comic Gene
- Original run: May 14, 2021 – May 13, 2022
- Volumes: 2
- Anime television series

Rusted Armors: Daybreak
- Directed by: Shinmei Kawahara
- Written by: Ohine Ezaki
- Music by: Koji Ide; Maydenfield
- Studio: Kigumi
- Licensed by: Crunchyroll
- Original network: Tokyo MX, SUN, TV Wakayama, AT-X, BS Fuji
- Original run: January 9, 2022 – March 27, 2022
- Episodes: 12

Rusted Armors (錆色のアーマ, Sabiiro no Āma) is a Japanese mixed-media project. It consists of various 2.5D stage plays, with the first play running in 2017. A manga series with art by hagi was serialized in Media Factory's shōjo manga magazine Monthly Comic Gene from January to October 2019 and was collected in two tankōbon volumes. A second manga series with art by Kairi Shimotsuki titled Rusted Armors: Daybreak has been serialized in the same magazine from May 2021 to May 2022 and was collected in two tankōbon volume. An anime television series by Kigumi also titled Rusted Armors: Daybreak aired from January to March 2022.

== Characters ==
Magoichi (孫一)
Voiced by: Taiki Sato
Oda Nobunaga (織田信長)
Voiced by: Toshiki Masuda
Tsurukubi (鶴首)
Voiced by: Kentarō Araki
Hotarubi (蛍火)
Voiced by: Takato Nagata
Kurohyo (黒氷)
Voiced by: Yūichirō Hirata
Deku (木偶)
Voiced by: spi
Ageha (アゲハ)
Voiced by: Yūki Kamisato
Hototogisu (不如帰)
Voiced by: Tsubasa Sakiyama
Lucio Cortes (ルシオ・コルテス, Rushio Korutesu)
Voiced by: Ryūji Satō

== Media ==
=== Manga ===
A manga series with art by hagi was serialized in Media Factory's Monthly Comic Gene magazine from January 15 to October 15, 2019. It was collected in two tankōbon volumes.

A second manga series with art by Kairi Shimotsuki titled Rusted Armors: Daybreak (錆色のアーマ-黎明-, Sabiiro no Āma: Reimei) was serialized in the same magazine from May 14, 2021, to May 13, 2022. It was collected in two tankōbon volumes.

=== Anime ===
In June 2019, an anime adaptation based on the project was announced. It was later revealed to be a television series produced by Kigumi, also titled Rusted Armors: Daybreak. The series is directed by Shinmei Kawahara, with Ohine Ezaki writing the series' scripts. It aired from January 9 to March 27, 2022, on Tokyo MX and other networks. Taiki Sato, Toshiki Masuda, and Ryūji Satō performed the opening theme song "Faith." Crunchyroll licensed the series.

==== Episode list ====
No.	Title	Written by (Note: Information is taken from the ending credits of each episode.)	Storyboarded by	Original release date
1	"A Jet Black Arrival"; Transliteration: "Shikkoku no Tōrai" (Japanese: 漆黒の到来)	Ohine Ezaki	Swallowtails; Keiichirō Furuya	January 9, 2022 (Note: This episode was pre-screened on December 30, 2021.)
2	"A Red-Orange Oath"; Transliteration: "Sekitō no Chikai" (Japanese: 赤橙の誓い)	Ohine Ezaki	Swallowtails; Keiichirō Furuya	January 16, 2022
3	"Steel Blue Memories"; Transliteration: "Tetsukon no Kioku" (Japanese: 鉄紺の記憶)	Ohine Ezaki	Swallowtails; Keiichirō Furuya	January 23, 2022
4	"A Jasmine-Colored Lantern"; Transliteration: "Kuchinashi Iro no Tomoshibi" (Japanese: 梔子色の灯)	Ohine Ezaki	Makoto Satō	January 30, 2022
5	"Gray Testament"; Transliteration: "Nibi Iro no Yuigon" (Japanese: 鈍色の遺言)	Ohine Ezaki	Swallowtails; Keiichirō Furuya	February 6, 2022
6	"A Black Encounter"; Transliteration: "Kurobeni no Kaikō" (Japanese: 黒紅の邂逅)	Ohine Ezaki	Makoto Satō	February 13, 2022
7	"An Ebon Trial"; Transliteration: "Karasuba Iro no Shiren" (Japanese: 烏羽色の試練)	Ohine Ezaki	Swallowtails; Keiichirō Furuya	February 20, 2022
8	"A Faint-Pink Prayer"; Transliteration: "Usuzakura no Kibō" (Japanese: 薄桜の祈望)	Ohine Ezaki	Swallowtails; Keiichirō Furuya	February 27, 2022
9	"Peach Treachery"; Transliteration: "Hanezu no Gyakushin" (Japanese: 朱華の逆心)	Ohine Ezaki	Makoto Satō	March 6, 2022
10	"Crimson Determination"; Transliteration: "Hiiro no Ketsui" (Japanese: 緋色の決意)	Ohine Ezaki	Swallowtails; Keiichirō Furuya	March 13, 2022
11	"A Mauve Wish"; Transliteration: "Keshi Murasaki no Negai" (Japanese: 滅紫の願い)	Ohine Ezaki	Swallowtails; Keiichirō Furuya	March 20, 2022
12	"Rusted Armor"; Transliteration: "Sabiiro no Āma" (Japanese: 錆色のアーマ)	Ohine Ezaki	Swallowtails; Keiichirō Furuya	March 27, 2022
