= Unbreakable Machine-Doll =

Japanese light novel and its adaptations

- The cover of the first volume of the light novel featuring the main female character, Yaya.

機巧少女は傷つかない (Mashin-Dōru wa kizutsukanai)
- Genre: Action, Fantasy, Harem
- Light novel
- Written by: Reiji Kaitō
- Illustrated by: Llo
- Published by: Media Factory
- Imprint: MF Bunko J
- Original run: November 21, 2009 – July 25, 2017
- Volumes: 17
- Manga
- Written by: Reiji Kaitō
- Illustrated by: Hakaru Takagi
- Published by: Media Factory
- Magazine: Monthly Comic Alive
- Original run: April 27, 2010 – July 27, 2017 (indefinite hiatus)
- Volumes: 9
- Manga

Gene Metallica: Unbreakable Machine-Doll Re:Acta
- Written by: Reiji Kaitō
- Illustrated by: Misato Kamada
- Published by: Media Factory
- Magazine: Monthly Comic Gene
- Original run: April 15, 2013 – April 15, 2014
- Volumes: 2
- Anime television series
- Directed by: Kinji Yoshimoto
- Written by: Yūko Kakihara
- Music by: Masaru Yokoyama
- Studio: Lerche
- Licensed by: Crunchyroll: SA/SEA: Medialink
- Original network: AT-X, Tokyo MX, ytv, TVA, BS11
- English network: SEA: Animax Asia
- Original run: October 7, 2013 – December 23, 2013
- Episodes: 12 + 6 OVA
- icon

Unbreakable Machine-Doll (機巧少女(マシンドール)は傷つかない, Mashin-Dōru wa Kizutsukanai) is a Japanese light novel series written by Reiji Kaitō and illustrated by Llo. Media Factory has published seventeen volumes under their MF Bunko J imprint from November 2009 to July 2017. A manga adaptation by Hakaru Takagi began serialization in Media Factory's Monthly Comic Alive magazine in 2010. A 12-episode anime television series adaptation aired in Japan between October 7 and December 23, 2013, and is licensed by Crunchyroll (formerly known as Funimation) outside of Japan.

== Plot ==
In an alternate historical version of the United Kingdom in the early 20th century, scientists have created a mixture of technology and sorcery known as Machinart, circuits made from spells that are put into objects to bring them to life and give them artificial intelligence. These Automatons were developed as a military weapon and spread throughout the world; the humans in charge of them became known as puppeteers.

A puppeteer named Raishin Akabane comes from Japan to Liverpool to study at Walpurgis Royal Academy of Machinart, along with his automaton Yaya. Once every four years, the Academy holds the "Night Party", a competition where puppeteers use their automatons to fight in hopes of obtaining the title of "Wiseman". Raishin, however, enters the school and the competition in order to get revenge on a mysterious genius who killed the other members of Raishin's family.

== Media ==
=== Light novels ===
Unbreakable Machine-Doll began as a light novel series, written by Reiji Kaitō and illustrated by Llo. The first volume was published by Media Factory under their MF Bunko J imprint on November 21, 2009. The last, seventeenth volume was published on July 25, 2017. A drama CD was released with a special edition of the fourth volume. In June 2017 Kadokawa released a commercial promoting the end of the series.

Unbreakable Machine-Doll

No.	Title	Japanese release date	Japanese ISBN
1	Facing "Cannibal Candy"	November 21, 2009	978-4-8401-3085-1
2	Facing "Sword Angel"	March 25, 2010	978-4-8401-3245-9
3	Facing "Elf Speeder"	July 21, 2010	978-4-8401-3452-1
4	Facing "Rosen Kavalier"	November 20, 2010	978-4-8401-3579-5 (regular edition); 978-4-8401-3580-1 (special edition)
5	Facing "King's Singer"	March 22, 2011	978-4-8401-3854-3
6	Facing "Crimson Red"	July 22, 2011	978-4-8401-3973-1
7	Facing "Genuin Legends"	December 21, 2011	978-4-8401-4336-3
8	Facing "Lady Justice"	April 23, 2012	978-4-8401-4549-7
9	Facing "Star Gazer"	September 22, 2012	978-4-8401-4820-7
10	Facing "Target Gold"	January 24, 2013	978-4-8401-4959-4
11	Facing "Doll's Master"	May 23, 2013	978-4-8401-5183-2
12	Facing "Master's Doll"	September 21, 2013	978-4-8401-5415-4
13	Facing "Elder Empress"	February 22, 2014	978-4-04-066308-1
14	Facing "Violet Silver"	October 24, 2014	978-4-04-066910-6
15	Facing "Machine doll I"	September 25, 2015	978-4-04-067470-4
16-1	Facing "Machine doll II-1"	July 25, 2017	978-4-04-069286-9
16-2	Facing "Machine doll II-2"	July 25, 2017	978-4-04-069287-6

Unbreakable Machine-Doll Additional Stories

No.	Title	Japanese release date	Japanese ISBN
1	Facing "Charmed Apron"	—	—
2	Facing "Palace Laplace I"	September 27, 2013	—
3	Facing "Palace Laplace II"	September 27, 2013	—
0	Facing "Shadow Moon"	December 31, 2013	—
4	Facing "Angelic Element" I	January 29, 2014	—
5	Facing "Angelic Element" II	February 26, 2014	—
6	Facing "Angelic Element" III	March 26, 2014	—
7	Facing "Angelic Element" IV	April 25, 2014	—
8	Facing "Angelic Element" V	May 28, 2014	—

=== Manga ===
A manga adaptation by Hakaru Takagi began serialization in Media Factory's Monthly Comic Alive magazine in its June 2010 issue, published on April 27, 2010. Its first tankōbon volume was released on November 22, 2010, and there have been nine volumes published as of March 23, 2016. A drama CD was released with a special edition of the first volume. A spin-off manga series, titled Gene Metallica: Unbreakable Machine-Doll Re:Acta (ジーンメタリカ-機巧少女は傷つかない Re:Acta-, Gīn Metarika -Mashīn-Dōru wa Kizutsukanai Re:Acta-) by Misato Kamada was published in Media Factory's Monthly Comic Gene between April 15, 2013 and April 15, 2014. Its first tankōbon volume was released on September 27, 2013. and the second and last on May 27, 2014.

Unbreakable Machine-Doll

No.	Release date	ISBN
1	November 22, 2010	978-4-8401-3378-4 (regular edition); 978-4-8401-3377-7 (special edition)
2	March 23, 2011	978-4-8401-3768-3
3	October 22, 2011	978-4-8401-4049-2
4	March 23, 2012	978-4-8401-4433-9
5	September 21, 2012	978-4-8401-4726-2
6	May 23, 2013	978-4-8401-5058-3
7	September 21, 2013	978-4-8401-5323-2
8	September 23, 2014	978-4-0406-6815-4
9	March 23, 2016	978-4-04-068205-1

Gene Metallica: Unbreakable Machine-Doll Re:Acta

No.	Release date	ISBN
1	September 27, 2013	978-4-8401-5330-0
2	May 27, 2014	978-4-0406-6564-1

=== Anime ===
There was a 12-episode anime series adaptation, produced by the studio Lerche, and aired in Japan between October 7 and December 23, 2013. It appeared first on AT-X and later on Tokyo MX, ytv, TV Aichi and BS11. Funimation simulcasted the series on their video portal. The series is directed by Kinji Yoshimoto and written by Yūko Kakihara, with character designs by Atsuko Watanabe and music by Masaru Yokoyama. The series covers the first three novels. The series' opening theme is "Anicca" by Hitomi Harada and its ending theme is "Maware! Setsugetsuka" (回レ! 雪月花), sung by Hitomi Harada, Ai Kayano and Yui Ogura, produced by Hige Driver. Six original video animation episodes were released with the Blu-ray Disc and DVD volumes (one with each) between December 25, 2013, and May 28, 2014. Following Sony’s acquisition from Crunchyroll, the series got moved to Crunchyroll.

==== Episode list ====
No.	Title	Animation Director	Screenplay	Original release date
1	"Facing "Cannibal Candy" I"	Ryoko Amisaki, Takashi Narakawa	Kakihara Yuko	October 7, 2013
While traveling to Walpurgis Machinart Academy, Raishin and his automaton, Yaya, stop the runaway train they are on. Upon arriving at the Academy, Raishin gets the name Second Last for placing the second worst in the entrance exam. Despite his grades Raishin is determined to fight in the Festival, an automaton fighting tournament in which only the top 100 students are allowed to participate, and win the title of Wiseman. Raishin encounters Charlotte and challenges her and her automaton Sigmund, to a battle against which is interrupted by other students. Raishin and Yaya defeat the other students with ease, and after noticing that Sigmund is badly injured, Raishin withdraws from his battle with Charlotte. The next day, Raishin tells Charlotte that he wants the Wiseman title so that he can obtain the forbidden techniques and use them to get revenge. During the conversation, Raishin spots Magnus passing by and confronts him.
2	"Facing "Cannibal Candy" II"	Hiromi Higuchi	Kakihara Yuko	October 14, 2013
Knowing that he would lose in a battle given the extreme differences in skill level, Raishin gives Magnus a small jar instead of challenging him to a battle. Felix, the discipline committee chief, engages Raishin to eliminate an unknown entity known as Cannibal Candy, which has destroyed many automata and caused the disappearance of 26 students, in exchange for entry into the Festival. Charlotte asks Raishin to go on a date, and he accepts much to Yaya's dismay. On their date, Raishin explains his background and that he only began studying two years ago, which explains his poor academic performance. Charlotte confesses to Raishin that she committed a terrible sin in the past. After the date, Raishin and Charlotte happen upon another Cannibal Candy crime scene.
3	"Facing "Cannibal Candy" III"	Ryoko Amisaki, Takashi Narakawa	Kakihara Yuko	October 21, 2013
At the crime scene, Raishin and Charlotte run into Felix, who scares Charlotte away. Back at the dorms, Raishin gives Yaya a pair of boots and tells her that he went out with Charlotte to confirm that she is not Cannibal Candy. Raishin receives a phone call from Lisette telling him that Charlotte is missing from her dorm. Shoko makes a visit to the dorms with Irori and Komurasaki. She tells Raishin that automatons are not humans and recalls the time she met Raishin. Lisette takes Raishin to an automaton laboratory. After Raishin deduces that Lisette was present at the scenes of the crimes, he discovers Lisette's preserved corpse in Felix's locker and that the Lisette that he had been talking to is actually a banned automaton. Outside the laboratory, Charlotte defeats an automaton, but it is a trap set by Felix to frame her as Cannibal Candy since a number of Eve's Hearts were found in her dorm room. Charlotte figures out that Felix is Cannibal Candy and that he planned to have Raishin eliminate her. Felix is about to kill Charlotte when an injured Raishin and Yaya arrive.
4	"Facing "Cannibal Candy" IV"	Takeo Takegami	Kakihara Yuko	October 28, 2013
Raishin and Yaya learn about Charlotte's past from Sigmund. Charlotte's family was distinguished for making automatons, but the family was stripped of everything when the young Prince of Wales was injured by one of her automata. Thus Charlotte attends school on a scholarship and is saving up to buy back the Eve's Hearts from her family's automata and hopes to be reunited with her family someday. Lisette is revealed to be Felix's automaton, Eliza, who is capable of absorbing magic abilities from automatons she devours. As she and Yaya fight, Eliza's body turns into mist trapping Yaya within, but with Yaya's blood spilling on Eliza, the effectiveness of Eliza's attacks decreases as only one type of magic can be utilized at a time and she is destroyed. Following the battle, Raishin is honored and granted entry into the Festival despite his poor grades, and Charlotte gives Raishin a pendant with defensive capabilities as a gift for clearing her name.
5	"Facing "Sword Angel" I"	Hiromi Higuchi, Keiko Kurosawa	Toshimitsu Takeuchi	November 4, 2013
Raishin and Yaya enter their dorm room and see Frey caught in a trap that she had set for Raishin. Later that day, Frey builds another trap by building a cage only to become trapped in it herself. Her brother Loki arrives to warn Raishin that puppeteers have taken notice of him for beating Felix and Eliza and that it would be in his best interest to withdraw from the Festival - Raishin refuses. That night, Frey sneaks into Raishin's bed in another assassination attempt, but falls asleep instead. The next day, Charlotte informs Raishin about Divine Works, the shady automaton manufacturer that sponsors Loki and Frey and obtains magic circuit patents through bribery. Frey's automaton Rabbi goes rogue and attacks Raishin and is knocked unconscious by a stun grenade. Raishin brings Komurasaki with him on a reconnaissance mission to the orphanage Loki and Frey grew up in. As they wait, Yaya and Sigmund discuss what being human is all about and Yaya is suddenly attacked.
6	"Facing "Sword Angel" II"	Sugimoto Gong	Toshimitsu Takeuchi	November 11, 2013
Yaya regains consciousness after being badly damaged by the attack, but is in need of repairs by an expert puppet maker. At the orphanage Raishin and Komurasaki meet Yomi, the prototype automaton of the Garm series that is about to be disposed of. Yomi shows them around the orphanage and they learn about Frey's background. They end up in a lab where illegal experiments on humans take place when the alarm sounds. Raishin, Komurasaki, and Yomi are pursued by the guards through the sewers and Yomi tells them that if Frey loses during the Festival, the Garm series of automata will be disposed of and be replaced by the Angel series. Critically wounded after protecting Raishin from gunfire, Yomi sacrifices herself to allow Raishin and Komurasaki to escape. Raishin meets up with Shoko in his room and she orders him to remove Rabbi's magic circuit. The Walpurgis Night festival begins with Raishin battling Loki instead of Frey. Raishin is severely wounded after taking the hit from Cherubim, in sword form, to protect Yaya.
7	"Facing "Sword Angel" III"	Takashi Narakawa, Keiko Kurosawa, Hiromi Higuchi, Takehiko Matsumoto, Ryoko Amisaki, Futoshi Higashide	Toshimitsu Takeuchi	November 18, 2013
With Raishin lying unconscious, Loki, realizing that Yaya would fight back aggressively, walks away and opts not to take his glove. Loki is scorned by Bronson for dropping his rank from 7 to 99 to keep Frey out of the fight. Raishin wakes up in the infirmary as the attack missed his vitals. Outside the infirmary, Loki and Frey fight each other. Rabbi goes berserk and starts draining Frey's blood and absorbing its magical power. Just before Rabbi hurts Loki, Raishin intervenes and the two of them stop Rabbi. Raishin learns that Frey is a synthetic white medium, a child with great magic levels due to artificial installation of a magical circuit in her heart. Raishin and Yaya return to the orphanage only to find the Garm automata have already been scrapped. They are ambushed and Loki arrives on the scene.
8	"Facing "Sword Angel" IV"	Keiko Kurosawa, Futoshi Higashide	Toshimitsu Takeuchi	November 25, 2013
Kimberley brings Frey and Charlotte to the orphanage to observe the fight. Raishin and Loki battle Bronson's automaton, Lucifer, the latest model of the Angel automata, who overwhelms Yaya and Cherubim. Bronson explains that he brought Frey and Loki from America to be test subjects for his experiments for the progress of mankind. By working together, Yaya and Cherubim destroy Lucifer as Cherubim engages him in direct combat while Yaya uses explosives hidden in her sleeves to disable his jet circuit. Bronson is about to shoot Raishin and Loki, who have both collapsed from injuries, when Kimberley brings the crusaders in to arrest Bronson for experimenting on children. Raishin and Loki are brought to the infirmary where Yaya, intent on treating Raishin herself, stirs up trouble. Raishin notices a girl falling from the roof and Yaya saves her, while Charlotte and Sigmund destroy the Academy's clock tower.
9	"Facing "Elf Speeder" I"	Tomohito Hirose, Koji Takayama	Toshimitsu Takeuchi	December 2, 2013
The girl whom Yaya saved is Charlotte's younger sister, Henriette, who has made several suicide attempts. Realizing that the attack on the clock tower contradicts Charlotte's nature, Raishin goes searching for her. Cedric sends Charlotte to see Raishin with a warning for him to stay away from Henriette. Frey locates Henriette with her automata just before she hangs herself. That night, Raishin is ready to face the 87th ranked puppeteer who does not show up. Henriette makes another suicide attempt but is stopped by Charlotte. Raishin learns from Kimberley that the Academy's headmaster Rutherford is being targeted and he deduces that the Kingsfort family is involved. The next day, Raishin spots Rutherford by the ruins of the clock tower and sends Yaya to contact Shoko. He sees Henriette headed towards the ruins and when Sigmund unleashes a Luster Cannon attack, the ground underneath their feet collapses causing Raishin and Henriette to fall.
10	"Facing "Elf Speeder" II"	Masakazu Saito, Takahiro Mizuno	Toshimitsu Takeuchi	December 9, 2013
Yaya attempts to follow Raishin, but is stopped by Kimberley who warns her that she is being watched. Shin escorts Charlotte back to Cedric, who lashes out at Charlotte for the roundabout approach of her assassination attempt. Raishin and Henriette navigate underground and while resting, they find common ground as both were considered to be inferior siblings. They later encounter Magnus and one of his automata who resembles Nadeshiko, as well as Rutherford. Shin attacks Raishin but Magnus's automaton intervenes and forces Shin to retreat. Back on the surface, Raishin is reunited with Yaya. Back in the dorm, Raishin tells Yaya that his late parents had arranged for a marriage for him. That night, Raishin's opponent for the festival fails to show up for the third straight night and he devises a plan to draw out the conspirators by kidnapping Henriette. Cedric orders Shin to retrieve Henriette and kill Raishin, while Cedric tortures Charlotte as a way to satisfy Felix. Shin approaches Raishin and engages him in battle.
11	"Facing "Elf Speeder" III"	Keiko Kurosawa, Takashi Narakawa, Tomoko Iwasa, Ryoko Amisaki, Masumi Hoshino, Hiromi Higuchi, Futoshi Higashide	Toshimitsu Takeuchi	December 16, 2013
Shin wounds Raishin but retreats due to the unexpected appearance of Loki and Frey. Back at the infirmary, Henriette tells Raishin that she is at fault for letting the automaton that attacked the Prince of Wales go rogue and also tells him that she had been trying to kill herself so that Charlotte would not be burdened with her life. Meanwhile, Sigmund begs Charlotte to stop the assassination and Raishin arrives to tell her that killing Rutherford will make her dream of restoring her family's status impossible. Unable to see things Raishin's way, Sigmund and Yaya fight. Raishin knocks Charlotte off Sigmund and finally convinces her to stop the assassination. Shin appears and calls himself a divine being called a Machine-Doll for being able to operate without a puppeteer supplying magic.
12	"Facing "Elf Speeder" IV"	Mokoto Iino, Takehiko Matsumoto, Takashi Narakawa, Keiko Kurosawa, Yuji Moriyama, Kouji Yamagata	Toshimitsu Takeuchi	December 23, 2013
Shoko recalls the past when she gave Raishin a new lease on life on the condition that he kill Tenzen or else she would use his body parts to build an automaton. Before Raishin fights Shin, Charlotte tells Frey the truth about her situation to keep Raishin from putting himself in danger. During the battle, Raishin gets Shin to attack from behind where Yaya is waiting for him. She slams Shin into a brick wall and repeatedly throws punches to immobilize him. Sigmund follows up by firing his Luster Cannon. Shin dodges the attack, thereby confirming the presence of his puppeteer as he could not have dodged the attack without a puppeteer resupplying him with magic. Frey locates Cedric and Yaya activates her Final Stronghold ability to defeat Shin. Cedric and Shin retreat and Cedric reveals herself to be the 87th ranked puppeteer, Alice Bernstein. Having watched the battle from a distance, Kimberley warns Magnus that as Tenzen Akabane he is being closely watched and that manufacturing human life is magic's greatest taboo. The next day, Raishin recovers in the infirmary and the girls stir up a big commotion over Raishin's presumed preference over girls with large breasts, which greatly upsets Charlotte. Kimberley drops by to inform Raishin that the clock tower will be rebuilt using the Belew family fortune that was confiscated and frozen following the incident and that Henriette's enrollment has been voided but that she will remain at the Academy as Cruel's lab assistant. After everybody but Yaya leaves, Yaya expresses her concern about having to face her friends, but Raishin maintains his optimism, which Yaya interprets as a declaration of love.

==== Home media ====
Volume	Release Date	Episodes	Catalog No.	
Volume	Release Date	Episodes	BD	DVD
1	December 25, 2013	1–2	ZMXZ-8981	ZMBZ-8991
2	January 29, 2014	3–4	ZMXZ-8982	ZMBZ-8992
3	February 26, 2014	5–6	ZMXZ-8983	ZMBZ-8993
4	March 26, 2014	7–8	ZMXZ-8984	ZMBZ-8994
5	April 25, 2014	9–10	ZMXZ-8985	ZMBZ-8995
6	May 28, 2014	11–12	ZMXZ-8986	ZMBZ-8996

=== Web radio ===
The Radio Unbreakable Machine-Doll Main cast, web radio program that had been delivered up to February 25, 2014, from September 3, 2013, at animate TV and sound fountain. Hiro Shimono (Akabane Raishin), Hitomi Harada (Yaya), and Megumi Takamoto (Charlotte Belew).

=== Video games ===
A mobile game titled Unbreakable Machine-Doll: Facing "Burnt Red" was released for Android and iOS in 2013. The story of Facing "Burnt Red" was edited by the original novel's author, Reiji Kaitō. The game featured an original character named Kaguya, voiced by Nao Touyama, and had a theme song, "Burnt Red", sung by Hitomi Harada. On January 30, 2015, the game ended service.

== See also ==
- Mushi-Uta, another light novel series illustrated by the same illustrator.
- Oreshura, another light novel series illustrated by the same illustrator.
- Reincarnated as a Sword, another light novel series illustrated by the same illustrator.
