= The Case Book of Arne =

2017 video game

- First tankōbon volume cover of the manga adaptation

アルネの事件簿 (Arune no Jikenbo)
- Genre: Mystery
- Video game
- Developer: Harumurasaki
- Publisher: Vaka Game Magazine
- Genre: Adventure, Gothic Horror
- Engine: RPG Maker
- Platform: Steam
- Released: November 6, 2017; October 28, 2020 (Steam)
- Manga
- Written by: Harumurasaki
- Illustrated by: Soraho Ina
- Published by: Media Factory
- Imprint: MF Comics Gene Series
- Magazine: Monthly Comic Gene
- Original run: November 15, 2018 – March 15, 2022
- Volumes: 4
- Anime television series
- Directed by: Keisuke Inoue
- Produced by: Mayo Arita; Ayaka Sugiura; Yuito Hirahara; Kaya Igarashi; Hotate Inaba; Emi Kashimura; Aya Iizuka; Kouta Arai
- Written by: Keisuke Inoue (Note: Series composition); Harumurasaki; Aya Matsui (Note: Screenplay); Hitomi Ogawa; Akira Nishikubo
- Music by: Yoshiaki Fujisawa
- Studio: Silver Link
- Licensed by: Crunchyroll: SEA: Plus Media Networks Asia
- Original network: Nippon TV, BS NTV, AT-X
- Original run: January 7, 2026 – March 25, 2026
- Episodes: 12
- Manga

The Case Book of Arne: Memory of Blood
- Written by: Harumurasaki
- Illustrated by: Soraho Ina
- Published by: Bushiroad
- Magazine: Comic Growl
- Original run: January 7, 2026 – present
- icon

The Case Book of Arne (Japanese: アルネの事件簿, Hepburn: Arune no Jikenbo) is a Japanese Gothic horror mystery adventure game by Harumurasaki (Murasaki), with character designs by Harutarō. It was created using RPG Maker and was originally released as freeware via the Vaka Game Magazine website in November 2017. It is also available on Steam in Japanese, Chinese, and English. A manga adaptation with art by Soraho Ina was serialized in Media Factory's shōjo manga magazine Monthly Comic Gene from November 2018 to March 2022 and was collected in four tankōbon volumes. An anime television series adaptation produced by Silver Link aired from January to March 2026.

== Plot ==
Lügenberg is a city where supernatural beings and humans coexist. Arne Neuntöte, a young vampire with supernatural powers, runs a private investigation office specializing in occult cases. Despite his youthful appearance, Arne is an experienced detective who takes on requests involving curses, monsters, and unexplained phenomena that ordinary authorities cannot handle.

Arne works alongside Lynn Reinweiß, the daughter of a human nobleman with a strong interest in vampires, who becomes his assistant after a chance encounter. Together, they investigate a series of interconnected cases involving ghosts, werewolves, witches, and other supernatural entities, many of which are tied to the hidden history of the city.

== Characters ==
Louis Hartmann (ルイス・ハルトマン, Ruisu Harutoman)
Voiced by: Mariya Ise
An original character for the anime, forming a trio with Arne and Lynn to solve cases.
Arne Neuntöte (アルネ・ノインテーター, Arune Nointētā)
Voiced by: Koki Uchiyama, Aimi Tanaka (young)
Lynn Reinweiß (リン・ラインヴァイス, Rin Rainvaisu)
Voiced by: Yuka Nukui
Zisye (ジシェ, Jishe)
Voiced by: Yuki Sakakihara
Nachzehrer (ナハツェーラー, Nahatsērā)
Voiced by: Yūki Shin
Amy (エイミー, Eimī)
Voiced by: Yōko Hikasa
Gordon (ゴードン, Gōdon)
Voiced by: Hiroshi Naka
The loyal, seemingly respectable butler.
Diana (ディアナ)
Voiced by: Reo Osanai
A kind maid who is like an older sister to Lynn.
Elise (エリーゼ, Erīze)
Voiced by: Momoka Terasawa
Klaus's clumsy personal maid.
Bernd (ベルント, Berunto)
Voiced by: Rikuya Yasuda
The seemingly pleasant but potentially shady security guard.
Heinz (ハインツ, Haintsu)
Voiced by: Yūto Uemura
The manor's skilled chef.
Kai (カイ)
Voiced by: Kakeru Hatano
The cheery gardener with feelings for Diana.
Phantom Thief Red Riding Hood (怪盗赤ずきん, Kaitō Akazukin)
Voiced by: Yūko Miyamura

== Other media ==
=== Manga ===
A manga adaptation illustrated by Soraho Ina was serialized in Media Factory's shōjo manga magazine Monthly Comic Gene from November 15, 2018, to March 15, 2022. The manga's chapters were collected into four tankōbon volumes from April 27, 2019, to March 26, 2022.

A second manga adaptation also illustrated by Ina, based on the anime adaptation's episodes, began serialization on Bushiroad's Comic Growl website on January 7, 2026.

No.	Release date	ISBN
1	April 27, 2019	978-4-04-065660-1
2	December 27, 2019	978-4-04-064083-9
3	February 25, 2021	978-4-04-064754-8
4	March 26, 2022	978-4-04-680350-4

=== Anime ===
An anime television series adaptation was announced on November 6, 2024. It is produced by Silver Link and directed by Keisuke Inoue, with Inoue and Harumurasaki handling series composition with episode screenplays by Aya Matsui, Hitomi Ogawa and Akira Nishikubo, Akiko Satō designing the characters based on Harutarō's original designs and also serving as chief animation director, and Yoshiaki Fujisawa composing the music. The series aired from January 7 to March 25, 2026, on Nippon TV's AnichU programming block and other networks. (Note: Nippon TV listed the series premiere on January 6 at 25:29, which is effectively January 7 at 1:29 a.m. JST.) The opening theme song is "Q.E.D.", performed by Sou, while the ending theme song is "Ningyō no Machi" (人形の街; 'Doll Town'), performed by Watashi Kobayashi. Crunchyroll is streaming the series. Plus Media Networks Asia licensed the series in Southeast Asia and broadcasts it on Aniplus Asia.

==== Episodes ====
No.	Title	Directed by	Written by	Storyboarded by	Original release date
1	"Those Who Dig Pits for Others Will Fall in Themselves; Wer anderen eine Grube gräbt, fällt selbst hinein." Transliteration: "Tanin no Haka o Horu Mono wa, Mizukara Soko ni Ochīru" (Japanese: 他人の墓を掘るものは、自らそこに陥る)	Keisuke Inoue	Aya Matsui	Keisuke Inoue	January 7, 2026 (Note: This episode aired at 1:35 a.m. JST, 6 minutes after the regular air time on Nippon TV.)
Louis Hartmann's father, a private detective, is murdered while investigating a vampire murderer, Gravedigger. Louis insists the supernatural is not real and spends months investigating alone. He encounters the Arne Detective Agency investigating Gravedigger and is surprised Arne is even younger than him. Lynn agrees the murderer is not a vampire since the victims weren't bitten but squeezed with great strength to extract the blood. Louis shows Arne his mother's handkerchief his father was holding when he died, then has a sudden epiphany when he sees his father used blood to turn the embroidered flowers red. A local man named Odo hangs himself after claiming he was Gravedigger. Louis realises Odo was actually murdered and confronts the real Gravedigger, Adelina, a café owner. Louis finds her watering white flowers with her victims blood to turn the petals red. Adelina reveals she is actually a witch and her accomplice who squeezed the victims was her earth golem. The golem stabs Louis but he is rescued by Arne who swallows a vial of blood and transforms into an adult vampire, the most powerful in the world called Arne Neuntote. Before dying Louis is forced to admit the supernatural really exists. Arne's second assistant, necromancer Amy, reanimates Louis to get his revenge by stabbing Adelina to death. After burying Louis Arne moves on to the next case.
2	"There Is Always Sunshine after the Rain; Auf jeden Regen folgt auch Sonnenschein."; Transliteration: "Subete no Ame no Ato ni Wa, Hizashi ga Zoku" (Japanese: ラインヴァイス家殺人事件)	Junya Koshiba	Hitomi Ogawa	Kazuaki Mōri	January 14, 2026
Lynn recalls meeting Arne after the second anniversary of her mother Rose's death. Her servants were her only company since her father Klaus went mad after Rose's death. When murders began occurring in the town butler Gordon forbade Lynn from leaving the mansion. Late one night she saw Klaus leave the mansion and followed him into town. Klaus vanished and she witnessed two men murdered by a monster. She was suddenly teleported away by a necklace Rose gave her. Appearing in an unfamiliar town with a castle she assumed she was dreaming and opened a coffin hoping to meet a handsome vampire, and ended up finding Arne. She also met Zisye, the real "boy who cried wolf" from the fairytale, whose existence is so unstable he only exists in mirrors. Learning he is a detective Lynn hired him to investigate Klaus. At first Arne refused until he saw Lynn's necklace and abruptly agreed. He revealed in the past the nine most powerful vampires sacrificed their hearts to create him, but after an incident he only has one heart remaining. With her help he infiltrated Klaus' room and recognised a portrait of Rose. Lynn feared Klaus' madness has worsened as he talked about Rose coming back from the dead. It is shown Klaus had numerous body parts in his office with plans to stitch them together into one body.
3	"Misfortune Never Visits Alone; Ein Unglück kommt selten allein." Transliteration: "Sainan wa Mettani Hitotsu de wa Yattekonai" (Japanese: 災難はめったにひとつではやってこない)	Yūri Hagiwara	Hitomi Ogawa	Yūya Horiuchi	January 21, 2026 (Note: This episode aired at 1:55 a.m. JST, 26 minutes after the regular air time on Nippon TV.)
Arne informed Lynn Klaus was experimenting with black magic. Klaus summoned Lynn to his room and shortly after the servant Berndt found Lynn unconscious and Klaus dead. Arne concluded the body was a fake. Arne returned to Klaus' lab and confirmed he was close to an actual reanimation spell. He also found the real body of Klaus on the floor, concluding he must have had an accomplice who murdered him. Arne is certain Klaus made the fake so he could escape with Lynn and the resurrected Rose. Arne concluded the accomplice must have been someone small enough to escape through the air vent. He also discovered yet another secret room under the lab containing the tomb of Nachzehrer, one of the vampire lords who created Arne. Arne sensed one of his hearts nearby. Gordon revealed a horrible secret to Lynn; maids Diana and Elise wanted to have relationships with servants Kai and Berndt; but Klaus refused as he was already forcing Diana and Elise to have sex with his houseguests. As all the servants had motives to want Klaus dead Gordon begged Lynn to protect them by not involving the police. Soon all the servants were accusing each other while Lynn couldn't handle the fact no one else cared Klaus was dead, so she gave them until morning to confess or she would call the police.
4	"Those Who Never Gamble Never Win; Wer nicht wagt, der nicht gewinnt." Transliteration: "Kake o Shinai Mono wa, Nani mo Te ni Irenai" (Japanese: 賭けをしないものは、何も手に入れない)	Takahiro Nakatsugawa	Hitomi Ogawa	Kazuaki Mōri	January 28, 2026
The servants all provided explanations of where they were during Klaus' murder. Arne, having temporarily lost control of his body to Nachzehrer, caught Kai trying to escape and violently brought him back. Lynne slapped him, returning Arne to normal. Lynne was unsure whom to believe, until Zisye told her to stop pretending to be mistress of the household, be herself instead and solve the case. Zisye informed her Elise wasn't in her room like she claimed, so Lynne confronted her and learned Elise had broken a vase, so she was actually fetching a replacement from a storeroom. A note summoned Lynne to the garden where she was almost attacked by the normally loyal guard dogs. Arne returned and sent the dogs away, explaining about Nachzehrer, so Lynne forgave him for hurting Kai. Given the servant's statements and the locations of all the mirrors Zisye was observing from, Arne and Lynne agreed Klaus was not killed by any of them. Arne suspected the dogs attacked because of an unfamiliar scent on Lynne, which she rushed to the bathroom to wash off. There she was attacked by the real killer. Bleeding to death she asked Arne to drink what was left, willing to become his servant under his total control if it gave her time to find Klaus' killer. Amused, Klaus drank her blood then gave her a drop of his own, turning her into a vampire. After gathering all the servants Arne accused Elise of murdering Klaus then challenged Lynne to prove her innocence using all evidence gathered so far.
5	"One Swallow Does Not a Summer Make! Eine Schwalbe macht noch keinen Sommer!"; Transliteration: "Ichi wa no Tsubame ga Natsu o Motarasu Node wa Nai" (Japanese: 一羽の燕が夏をもたらすのではない)	Masaya Tanabe	Hitomi Ogawa	Kazuaki Mōri	February 4, 2026 (Note: This episode aired at 1:45 a.m. JST, 16 minutes after the regular air time on Nippon TV.)
Arne claimed only Elise was small enough to escape Klaus' office by the air vent. Lynne countered that there was a layer of dust proving no one used the vent, so Elise was innocent. Heinz couldn't have left the kitchen without being seen by Berndt or disturbing the dogs. Diana and Kai could have worked together to access Klaus' office balcony but Diana had a phobia of heights, so they were innocent. Berndt had a blood phobia, making it impossible to have removed the head of the fake Klaus. This left only one possibility, backed up by Zisye who reported he did not see Gordon during the time of the murder, or at any other time. Lynne accused Gordon of murdering Klaus and going unseen by Zisye because he was a vampire and didn't appear in mirrors. Gordon admitted he is a vampire and was content serving Lynne's family, until Klaus acquired the missing heart of Nachzehrer to use it to resurrect Rose, but Gordon planned to revive Nachzehrer instead. When Lynne threatened to call the police he tried to murder her in the bathroom, only for Arne to turn her into a vampire. Gordon suddenly sacrificed himself to resurrect Nachzehrer, who challenged Arne to a duel. The duel destroyed the mansion but Arne was victorious and reabsorbed Nachzehrer's heart. Lynne ultimately decided to leave the mansion behind to see more of the world with Arne.
6	"Time Will Tell; Kommt Zeit, kommt Rat."; Transliteration: "Toki ga Kureba, Jogen ga Kuru" (Japanese: 時がくれば、助言がくる)	Masahiko Suzuki	Hitomi Ogawa	Ryūtarō Awabe (Wit Studio)	February 11, 2026
Lynne asked Arne about something Gordon said, that he was not the first monster to attack her. Arne confirmed Lynne is both human and something else, so she was not turned into a vampire by his blood at all. Back in the present, Nachzehrer's personality is placed into a stuffed doll that works with Arne, Lynne and Amy. They receive a request from mermaid Yurate who wishes to know why her lover Hanna tried to murder her, forcing Yurate to kill her in self-defence. She explains they met when Hanna tried to drown herself and Yurate saved her. They became lovers for a short time until the night Hanna tried to kill her. Arne deduces Hanna selfishly wanted to eat mermaid flesh and become immortal. Lynne is surprised when Yurate claims she only spent 50 years with Hanna. Arne realises because mermaids live thousands of years their view of time is different, so Yurate never noticed Hanna aging into an elderly woman. He instead deduces Hanna was afraid of leaving Yurate alone after she died, so she tried to knock Yurate unconscious and painlessly eat some of her flesh so they could stay together. Yurate is relieved Hanna loved her after all. Meanwhile, Hanna arises from her grave, having swallowed one drop of Yurate's blood, allowing her to avoid death.
7	"Eating Whets The Appetite; Der Appetit kommt bein Essen"; Transliteration: "Taberu koto de Shokuyoku ga Waku" (Japanese: 食べることで食欲がわく)	Takahiro Nakatsugawa	Aya Matsuji	Kazuaki Mōri	February 18, 2026
Little Red Phantom Thief announces she will rob a museum and steal the Blue Heart by master jeweller Yelle. The Director approaches Arne who agrees to protect the Heart as he has dealt with Little Red before. He sends Lynn on a case to find the missing boyfriends of three women. The Director admits Yelle and the Heart actually went missing days ago, so he wants Arne to protect the entire museum as he is afraid Little Red might steal something else instead. Lynn explains to Amy all three missing boyfriends had ties to the museum; a delivery man, a curator and a tour-guide. Arne sends Lynn to find Yelle. Lynn learns from his landlord that Yelle was ill but had been working on his next masterpiece as a gift for someone. Lynn buys a pendant filled with silver paint to supposedly ward off evil spirits. Little Red, an old friend of Zisye's, is also investigating Yelle's disappearance. Lynn finds a street artist who painted Yelle's portrait three weeks previously, but Yelle never collected it. Little Red infiltrates the museum and destroys a fake Heart she found. She then announces she will rescue Yelle before Arne and steal the real Heart. Amy suddenly locates the corpses of the missing boyfriends; coated in cement and displayed as headless statues in the museum.
8	"Desire and Love Make All Burdens Lighter; Lust und Liebe zu einem Ding macht alle Mühe und Arbeit gering" Transliteration: "Yokubō to Ai wa, Arayuru Rō o Kakuru Suru" (Japanese: 欲望と愛は、あらゆる労を軽くする)	Hidehiko Kadota	Aya Matsuji	Kazuaki Mōri	February 25, 2026
The Director reveals the statues were made by sculptor Silke. Lynn visits Silke's home and finds the stone heads. Silke reveals she is a medusa, and turned the four men to stone as art. She tries to petrify Lynn but Amy is petrified instead. Arne visits Yelle's workshop and is intrigued by a dead bluebell. Zisye mentions the bluebell to Little Red before helping Lynn lead Silke into a mirror trap where she petrifies herself. Amy returns to normal, as do her victim's bodies. Amy confirms the fourth victim is not Yelle. Arne confronts Little Red, who has found the Blue Heart, and reveals Yelle made the heart for his secret lover; a leannan-sidhe, a type of fairy that grants artistic talent to humans she falls in love with, in exchange for shortening their lives. Little Red takes them to Yelle's body in a field of bluebells nearby. A flashback shows Yelle and the leannan-sidhe falling in love, but Arne claims it was a parasitic love; Yelle wanted talent and leannan-sidhe wanted true love. Arne is satisfied he protected the Blue Heart while Lynn feels sorry the leanne-sidhe has such a tragic life.
9	"Not All That Glitters Is Gold; Es ist nicht alles Gold, was glänzt" Transliteration: "Hikaru mono Subete ga, Kin to wa Kagiranai" (Japanese: 光るものすべてが、金とは限らない)	Yasuo Ejima	Akira Nishikubo	Goichi Iwahata	March 4, 2026
Arne is visited by Sheila who explains after falling down stairs her husband lost his voice. She also reveals her husband and his three sons from a previous marriage are all invisible-people. Interviewing the sons; Oldest, Middle and Youngest, Arne discovers several things. Middle was investigating Sheila over the suspicious death of her previous husband. Youngest has gambling debts he convinced their father to pay. Middle believes Sheila stole their mother's jewellery. Sheila has an expensive watch that maybe a gift from a lover and Oldest was banned from inheriting the business due to incompetence. Lynn becomes suspicious after seeing Sheila meet with a man, though he claims he sells Sheila household products. Lynn remains suspicious as the man has a watch identical to Sheila's. In Sheila's room Arne finds a photograph Sheila claims is a patient from when she was a nurse. Sheila is later shown burning photographs and hiding jewellery. Arne reveals to Sheila the sons have been taking turns dressing in their father's clothes to make it seem he is still alive. In reality, they murdered him to take over the family business. Sheila goes mad and rushes home. Later, she sends Arne a letter inviting him to see everything was a misunderstanding. Arne does so, deliberately leaving Lynn behind. Together, all three sons show Arne their father is alive, yet Arne senses their father's clothes are covered in blood, and all three sons are carrying knives.
10	"Different Countries, Different Customs; Andere Länder, andere Sitten"; Transliteration: "Kotonaru Kuniguni, Kotonaru Kanshū" (Japanese: 異なる国々、異なる慣習)	Masaya Tanabe	Akira Nishikubo	Keiichiro Kawaguchi	March 11, 2026
Musician Erik Bernhardt is murdered despite being alone in a locked room. Arne discovers Erik was stabbed in the neck, and the landlady and Erik's girlfriend had to use a spare key to get inside. Erik also possessed cat food despite disliking animals, and an expensive painting. Arne locates the murder weapon, an ice pick. They also discover a colony of wild cats around the building. Arne notices the ice pick has dust stuck in Erik's blood, meaning it was extracted through an air vent after his murder. Nearby they encounter Heinz who works locally as a chef. He reveals Erik had an argument over missing wages with his employer, a pub owner. Lynn suspects the owner, but learns he has been on holiday for a week and had paid Erik's missing wages. Arne finds poison in the cat food proving Erik was trying to exterminate the cats. Arne deduces a cat came in through the vent, killed Erik to save the other cats, then left with the ice pick. He exposes one cat as a cat-sith, a demonic fairy, but lets it escape as it was just protecting its fellow cats. Lynn agrees when Arne points out there are thousands of local cats willing to protect the cat-sith. Meanwhile, there is something sinister about Erik's painting.
11	"Birds of a Feather Flock Together; Gleich und gleich gesellt sich gern" Transliteration: "Nitamonodōshi wa Tomoni Iru koto o Konomu" (Japanese: 似たもの同士は共にいることを好む)	Masahiro Hosoda	Aya Matsuji	Kazuaki Mōri	March 18, 2026
Arne announces all his recent cases are connected to one person, a painter. Silke the Medusa had one of his paintings, and more were also connected to the leannan-sidhe, the invisible family, Adelina the Gravedigger, the cat-sith and Yurate the mermaid. Even Lynn's father Klaus had a painting. Lynn is shocked to visit the painter's mansion and find he is Louis Hartmann, last victim of the Gravedigger. Arne confirms his paintings cause bloodlust in anyone that looks at them. Recalling Louis wanted to be a detective, not a painter, Lynn accuses him of being an imposter. Louis transforms and reveals himself as Vampire King Vlad the Impaler, aka Dracula. He tries to kill Lynn, who is saved by Arne. Vlad is confused why a vampire would save a human and traps Arne in a coffin, challenging Lynn to travel to his castle if she wants him back. Lynn identifies the castle as Poenari Castle. Little Red arrives first but is attacked by a strong vampire Zisye can't see through his mirror. Amy resurrects an army of Vlad's victims buried in the castle grounds, who overwhelm Vlad's undead guards. Lynn reaches Little Red surrounded by guards and a dozen paintings.
12	"All's Well That Ends Well; Ende gut, alles gut" Transliteration: "Owari Yokereba, Subete Yoshi" (Japanese: 終わりよければ、すべてよし)	Keisuke Inoue	Aya Matsuji	Keisuke Inoue	March 25, 2026
Little Red reveals to Lynn one of the room's paintings went missing after she witnessed it absorbing blood from Dracula. Dracula is confused by her claim Arne is trusted by many people, and trusts his friends with his life. Dracula decides to kill Arne, but he is stopped by Little Red. Lynn awakens Arne by shoving her blood into his mouth, and in turn Arne awakens Nachzehrer who has a grudge against Dracula and attacks him instantly. Arne takes more blood from Lynn's neck. Dracula cannot be killed, with Nachzehrer realising his heart is not inside his body. Lynn finds the missing painting, which is of Dracula himself. Dracula sends Lynn hallucinations of everyone she knows to convince her to stop, but she is protected by the pendant she bought at the museum, full of holy water and real silver paint. The pendant damages the painting, exposing Dracula's hidden heart which Lynn impales with a wooden stake, defeating him. Arne reabsorbs the damaged heart into himself while Dracula's soul is punished by being placed inside a caricature painting of himself then locked in a cupboard. Arne leaves them no time to celebrate as he accepts their next case straight away.
