= Allison Sumrall =

American voice actress (born 1979)

- Born: Allison Leigh Sumrall; July 21, 1979 (age 47); Houston, Texas, U.S.
- Education: University of Houston
- Occupation: Voice actress
- Years active: 1994–present

Allison Leigh Sumrall (born July 21, 1979) is an American voice actress, known for her roles in the English-language dubs of anime series. She is a veteran of the former Masquerade Theatre and Generations Theatre in Houston, Texas, and received her education in performing arts from the University of Houston. In anime, she is known as the voice of Miia from Monster Musume, Mui Aiba from Magical Warfare, Kagura from Azumanga Daioh, Lilith Asami from Trinity Seven, Nana Astar Deviluke from the To Love Ru series, Suzuka Itō from Shirobako, Yellow Diamond from Land of the Lustrous, Azusa Sawa from Girls und Panzer, and Taiga Fujimura from the Fate/Kaleid liner Prisma Illya series.

== Filmography ==
=== Anime ===
Year	Title	Role	Notes	Source
1994	Dirty Pair	Yuri	OVAs	
1998	Those Who Hunt Elves	Bizarre		
2002	UFO Ultramaiden Valkyrie	Keiko Sonoda		
2004	Azumanga Daioh	Kagura		
2005	Elfen Lied	Number 3, Saitou, Orphanage Girl		
2005	Dragon Ball Z	Princess Snake's Maid, East City Civilian, Nurse	Season 1-2	
2005	A Tree of Palme	Koram		
2007	Utawarerumono	Sakuya, Fumiriru	also OVA	
2012	Infinite Stratos	Riko Kishihara		
2013	Battle Girls: Time Paradox	Motochika Chosokabe		
2013	Campione	Anchorwoman		
2013	Little Busters!	Sasami Sasasegawa	also EX	
2013	Girls und Panzer	Azusa Sawa		
2013	Tenchi Muyo! War on Geminar	Bwoole		
2013	Phi Brain	Maze	also Season 2	
2013	Say I love you	Miki Arai		
2014	Fate/Kaleid liner Prisma Illya series	Taiga Fujimura	also Season 2-3	
2014	From the New World	Queen Monster Rat		
2014	Hakkenden: Eight Dogs of the East	Ruri Kobayakawa		
2014	Maria Holic	Honoka Tsutsui	also Season 2	
2014	The Ambition of Nobuna Oda	Nene, Narimasa Sasa, Od's mother		
2014	Sunday without God	Hana		
2014	Upotte	Hachihachi		
2015	Akame ga Kill	Aria's Mother		
2015	Dramatical Murder	Yoshie		
2015	Love, Chunibyo & Other Delusions	Grandmother Takanashi	Season 1	
2015	Hamatora	Nel		
2015	Leviathan: The Last Defense	Tsuchinoko, Narrator		
2015	Parasyte	Nobuko Izumi		
2015	Magical Warfare	Mui Aiba		
2015	Nobunaga the Fool	Hannibal Barca		
2016	Aoharu x Machinegun	Ichi Akabane		
2016	Chaika - Coffin Princess	Selma Kenworth		
2016	Trinity Seven	Lilith Asami		
2016	Wizard Barristers	Koromo Sasori		
2017	Amagi Brilliant Park	Salama		
2017	Monster Musume	Miia		
2019	Is It Wrong to Try to Pick Up Girls in a Dungeon?	Haruhime Sanjōno		
2019	My Youth Romantic Comedy Is Wrong, As I Expected	Yuka	Season 1	
2020	BanG Dream!	Tsugumi Hazawa	Season 2	
2020	After the Rain	En/Ku		
2020	Shirobako	Suzuka Itō		
2022	Iroduku: The World in Colors	Kurumi Kawai		
2023	Farming Life in Another World	Flowrem		
2024	Chained Soldier	Naon		
2024	I Parry Everything	Noor's Mom / Stella		
2024	Jellyfish Can't Swim in the Night	Miioko		
2025	Loner Life in Another World	Shield Girl		
2025	Plus-Sized Elf	Ino/Shopkeeper Woman		
2025	Flower and Asura	Rie		

=== Film ===
Year	Title	Role	Notes	Source
2016	Bodacious Space Pirates: Abyss of Hyperspace	Yayoi Yoshitomi, Shoko Kobayashimaru		
2016	Girls und Panzer der Film	Azusa Sawa, Mika		

=== Video games ===
List of dubbing performances in video games
Year	Title	Role	Notes	Source
2021	World's End Club	Nyoro		
