= Mikagura School Suite =

Japanese light novel, manga and anime series

- Light novel volume 1 cover

ミカグラ学園組曲 (Mikagura Gakuen Kumikyoku)
- Genre: Comedy
- Light novel
- Written by: Last Note
- Illustrated by: Akina
- Published by: Media Factory
- English publisher: NA: One Peace Books
- Imprint: MF Bunko J
- Original run: July 25, 2013 – August 25, 2016
- Volumes: 8
- Manga
- Written by: Last Note
- Illustrated by: Sayuki
- Published by: Media Factory
- English publisher: NA: One Peace Books
- Magazine: Monthly Comic Gene
- Original run: July 13, 2013 – February 15, 2016
- Volumes: 6
- Anime television series
- Directed by: Tarō Iwasaki
- Written by: Masahiro Yokotani
- Music by: Yoshiaki Fujisawa
- Studio: Doga Kobo
- Licensed by: AUS: Madman Entertainment; NA: Funimation
- Original network: TV Aichi, AT-X, Tokyo MX, Sun TV, KBS, BS11
- English network: US: Funimation Channel
- Original run: April 6, 2015 – June 22, 2015
- Episodes: 12

Mikagura School Suite (ミカグラ学園組曲, Mikagura Gakuen Kumikyoku) is a Japanese light novel series written by Last Note, with illustrations by Akina. The novels are inspired by songs written by Last Note which use Vocaloids for the vocals. Media Factory published eight volumes of the novels from July 2013 to August 2016. A manga adaptation by Sayuki was serialized in Media Factory's Monthly Comic Gene magazine. An anime television series produced by Doga Kobo and directed by Tarō Iwasaki aired in Japan between April and June 2015.

== Plot ==
Eruna Ichinomiya is a third-year middle school student who has not decided on which high school to attend, and spends her days skipping school and playing games at home. One day, Eruna's eyes are captivated by a photo of Seisa Mikagura in a pamphlet for Mikagura Private Academy, given to her by her cousin, Shigure Ninomiya. Feeling that it is fate, Eruna decides to attend Mikagura Private Academy. However, Eruna discovers that Mikagura Private Academy is a school where only cultural clubs exist, and that it has an intense battle system where students with special powers must fight each other as representatives of their own clubs.

== Characters ==
=== Main characters ===
Eruna Ichinomiya (一宮 エルナ, Ichinomiya Eruna)
Voiced by: Juri Kimura (Japanese); Monica Rial (English)
A somewhat dimwitted girl who has a romantic interest in girls and as a result spends much of her time playing dating simulation visual novels on her portable device. She enrolls into Mikagura Private Academy after her cousin Shigure recommends it to her, largely due to wanting to be able to meet Seisa whom she developed a strong interest in. She later form her own club, which she eventually names the "After School Paradise Club". Her abilities are "Toy Gun" (オモチャの銃, Omocha no Jū), which allows her to shoot a powerful laser from her fingertips, and "Toy Bayonet" (オモチャの銃剣, Omocha no Jūken), a bayonet made out of light, in addition to possessing incredible speed. Eruna is a descendant of the original Ichinomiya who along with Mikagura and Ninomiya founded the academy.
Seisa Mikagura (御神楽 星鎖, Mikagura Seisa)
Voiced by: Saori Ōnishi (Japanese); Jamie Marchi (English)
The granddaughter of Mikagura Academy's principal, who starts off as the sole member of the Going-Home Club but later joins Eruna's club. Seisa is a second-year at school, and is a hikikomori. She was once a member of the Art Club, but began secluding herself after she was betrayed by an upperclassman from the Photography Club. Her ability is known as "Killing Art" (キリングアート, Kiringu Āto), which allows her to reshape space by her will. Seisa is a descendant of the original Mikagura.
Otone Fujishiro (藤白 おとね, Fujishiro Otone)
Voiced by: Ari Ozawa (Japanese); Jad Saxton (English)
Like Eruna, Otone is a first-year student who eventually becomes a member of Eruna's club. She puts up a cold front towards others, but is often secretly lonely and bad at opening up to people, often living in a small house in the woods. Her ability is "Anticomplex" (アンチコンプレックス, Anchi Konpurekkusu), which allows her to make anything she wants out of ribbons.
Himi Yasaka (八坂 ひみ, Yasaka Himi)
Voiced by: Ayaka Suwa (Japanese); Lara Woodhull (English)
Representative of the Calligraphy Club, Himi is a very small second-year, and has the appearance of a young child. She is extremely innocent, positive, and always has a smile on her face. Occasionally, she is the victims of Eruna's "delusions". Her ability is "Lovely Ink" (ラブリーインク, Raburī Inku), which lets her form living ink attacks using a large calligraphy brush.
Shigure Ninomiya (二宮 シグレ, Ninomiya Shigure)
Voiced by: Nobunaga Shimazaki (Japanese); Ben Phillips (English)
Eruna's cousin, a third-year who is the representative of the Manga Research Club. He is very attached to Eruna, and tries all sorts of ways to get closer to her, but he has not succeeded even once, and it seems that she is only avoiding him more and more. His ability is "Hero Time" (ヒーロータイム, Hīrō Taimu) which lets him create midair platforms in order to swoop in for a heroic rescue. Shigure is a descendant of the original Ninomiya. Shigure kept knowledge of Eruna's ancestor a secret because he wants Eruna to make friends with Seisa naturally.
Yūto Akama (赤間 遊兔, Akama Yūto)
Voiced by: Natsuki Hanae (Japanese); Micah Solusod (English)
Yūto is a second-year who is the representative of the Drama Club. He is always smiling, and he is adored by the Drama Club members, who are known for being like a large family. He is always carrying a scythe, which is actually just a prop. His ability is "Coup d'Etat Faker" (クーデターフェイカー, Kūdetā Feikā), which lets him create illusions to fool his opponents.
Kyōma Kuzuryū (九頭龍 京摩, Kuzuryū Kyōma)
Voiced by: Yoshimasa Hosoya (Japanese); Chris Rager (English)
Kyōma is a third-year who is representative of the Art Club. His blunt attitude has caused most to fear him, but he can also be kind and is good at taking care of others; he also loves to drink milk. Both his face and uniform are always covered in paint. His ability is "Palette Barrett" (パレットバレット, Paretto Baretto) which lets him use paint to attack.
Sadamatsu Minatogawa (湊川 貞松, Minatogawa Sadamatsu)
Voiced by: Makoto Furukawa (Japanese); Jessie James Grelle (English)
Sadamatsu is a second-year who is both the leader and representative of the Flower Arrangement Club. He also seems to be spaced out, and shows no interest in anything. His ability is "Selfish Flower" (セルフィッシュフラワー, Serufisshu Furawā), which lets him manipulate plant life.
Asuhi Imizu (射水 アスヒ, Imizu Asuhi)
Voiced by: Ai Kakuma (Japanese); Trina Nishimura (English)
Asuhi is a first-year who is part of the Astronomy Club. He came directly from Mikagura Academy's junior high school, and it is said that he may become the next representative. He has a very cute appearance which often causes him to be mistaken for a girl. His ability is "Shooting Star" (シューティングスター, Shūtingu Sutā), which allows him shoot powerful stars from a telescope.
Bimii (ビミィ)
Voiced by: Yoshitsugu Matsuoka (Japanese); Sonny Strait (English)
Bimii is a mysterious winged creature, largely resembling a cat, who can only be seen by those eligible to attend Mikagura Academy and often ends his sentences with "ryui" (りゅい). He was originally human and can transform between the two using a somewhat terrifying method, becoming a ghost member of Eruna's club. Since his real name appears to be unpronounceable in human language, Eruna nicknames him "Bimii" after the word "bimyō" (微妙; lit. weird).

=== Other characters ===
Nyamirin (にゃみりん)
Voiced by: Haruka Tomatsu (Japanese); Alexis Tipton (English)
A third-year student who belongs to the Drama Club. She gave all the Drama Club members (except Yūto) animal-inspired names.
Usamaru (うさ丸)
Voiced by: Daiki Yamashita (Japanese); Clifford Chapin (English)
A freshman and member of the Drama Club. Often seen together with Tonkyun. He currently has not awoken his ability.
Tonkyun (トンきゅん)
Voiced by: Takuma Terashima (Japanese); Christopher Bevins (English)
A freshman and member of the Drama Club who is often seen together with Usamaru. His ability is "Ad Lib Role" (アドリブ・ロール, Adoribu Rōru), which makes flames burst from his hands burning anything and everything around him. He uses a hammer as his item, which transforms into two swords used in dual wielding. He is interrupted every time he tries to say his real name.
Kumano (熊野)
Voiced by: Yurika Kubo (Japanese); Sarah Wiedenheft (English)
A second-year student and member of the Drama Club who, like Himi, is very short.
Rumina Rikyū (離宮ルミナ, Rikyū Rumina)
Voiced by: Minami Takahashi (Japanese); Caitlin Glass (English)
Representative of the Newspaper Club. Her ability is "Secret Memories" (シークレットメモリーズ, Shīkuretto Memorīzu), which allows her to read from a book as her item, using embarrassing scoops to mentally damage her opponents.
Kurumi Narumi (鳴海クルミ, Narumi Kurumi)
Voiced by: Ai Kayano (Japanese); Bryn Apprill (English)
Eruna's teacher and Seisa's maid. Her serious and deadpan demeanor does not hide her dislike for Eruna's antics, but she can be soft to Seisa.
Meika Katai (花袋めいか, Katai Meika)
Voiced by: Reina Ueda (Japanese); Apphia Yu (English)
A freshman member of the Calligraphy Club. She is a shy girl and the first female friend Eruna made on the academy. Her ability is "Cutie Ink" (キューティーインク, Kyuuti Inku), which is similar to Himi's Lovely Ink but she only can bring one character to life, namely Keima (桂馬).
Azumi Sagara (相良あづみ, Sagara Azumi)
Voiced by: Rumi Ōkubo (Japanese); Trina Nishimura (English)
The ace of the Brass Club. Her ability is "Molto Accento" (モルト・アクセント, Moruto Akusento), which lets her manipulate gravity using sound pressure by playing a musical note from her trumpet.
Haruka Toishi (遠石遥架, Toishi Haruka)
Voiced by: Shizuka Ishigami (Japanese); Jennifer Pompa (English)
Representative of the Broadcast Club.

== Media ==
=== Print ===
Mikagura School Suite is a light novel series written by Last Note, with illustrations by Akina. Media Factory published eight volumes from July 25, 2013, to August 25, 2016.

A manga adaptation by Sayuki was serialized in Media Factory's Monthly Comic Gene magazine between the August 2013 and March 2016 issues. Media Factory published six tankōbon volumes from November 27, 2013, to March 26, 2016. One Peace Books will publish both the light novels and manga in English.

=== Anime ===
An anime television series adaptation, produced by Doga Kobo and directed by Tarō Iwasaki aired in Japan between April 7 and June 22, 2015. The series is written by Masahiro Yokotani and music is by Yoshiaki Fujisawa. Chief animation director Manamu Amazaki also designed the characters. The opening theme is "Hōkago Kakumei" (放課後革命; "After School Revolution") by Hōkago Rakuen-bu (Juri Kimura, Saori Ōnishi and Ari Ozawa). The ending themes are "Hōkago Stride" (放課後ストライド, After School Stride) by Kimura for episodes 1 and 9 onwards, "Rakuen Fanfare" (楽園ファンファーレ, Rakuen Fanfāre; "Paradise Fanfare") by Hōkago Rakuen-bu for episodes 2–7, and "Sekirara Candy" (赤裸々キャンディ, Naked Candy) by Ozawa for episode 8. The series is licensed in North America by Funimation, who simulcast the subtitled version as it aired and began streaming a broadcast dub version from June 9, 2015.

==== Episode list ====
No.	Title	Original release date
1	"Youthful Prelude" "Seishun Pureryūdo" (青春プレリュード)	April 6, 2015
A somewhat perverted schoolgirl named Eruna Ichinomiya is pressured into enrolling at a high school. Her cousin Shigure Ninomiya recommends his school called Mikagura Private Academy. Taking an interest in the principal's granddaughter Seisa Mikagura, Eruna decides to take the entrance exam proctored by teacher and Seisa's maid Kurumi Narumi. Eruna is eligible to enroll after being able to see the school's winged feline teacher, nicknaming him Bimii. During the entrance ceremony in April, Eruna learns about the school's system, in which students are required to join one of the school's clubs, using points earned by battles against other clubs in order to improve their quality of life. Having not yet joined a club, Eruna is put in a dorm room with only sleeping bags as furniture, sharing the dorm room with Meika Katai. Eruna and Meika both attempt to join the Calligraphy Club, led by representative Himi Yasaka, though Eruna is rejected due to her inexperience in calligraphy. After a few days of poor living conditions, Eruna is approached by Seisa, who invites Eruna to join the Going-Home Club on a trial period, with the condition that she will act as representative in a battle taking place next week.
2	"After-School Stride" "Hōkago Sutoraido" (放課後ストライド)	April 13, 2015
With her living conditions slightly improved, Eruna learns about how students can use special abilities during club battles, in which the objective is to destroy all three hovering crystals from their opponent within the allotted time. Eruna visits various clubs and learns about the representatives' special abilities. After visiting Himi at the Calligraphy Club, Kyōma Kuzuryū at the Art Club, Sadamatsu Minatogawa at the Flower Arrangement Club, Yūto Akama at the Drama Club and Asuhi Imizu at the Astronomy Club, Eruna struggles to come up with her own special ability when trying to attack Shigure. On the day of the club battle, Eruna is surprised that the one-hour broadcast match is against Himi. Finding herself on the defensive and hiding in a sealed room, Eruna briefly sees a mysterious woman, implied as her ancestor, who tells Eruna that she needs to awaken her dormant powers. When Himi finds and attacks Eruna using the ability called "Lovely Ink", which can form living ink attacks using a large calligraphy brush, Eruna discovers her supersonic speed and the ability to shoot lasers from her fingertips called "Toy Gun". Eruna wins the match by evading Himi's attacks and destroying Himi's three crystals simultaneously.
3	"Not Quite a Heroine" "Hiroin Miman" (ヒロイン未満)	April 20, 2015
Eruna has an interview with Rumina Rikyū, representative of the Newspaper Club, concerning her victory in the match. After learning about an upcoming rookie tournament for new students, Eruna brings Himi along to Seisa's mansion, though Seisa claims that Eruna only won the club battle because Himi let her guard down. With her club membership on the line, Eruna is challenged by Seisa to a practice club battle. Before then, Eruna observes a practice match between Asuhi and Yūto, in which Asuhi's ability to blast stars from a telescope called "Shooting Star" is no match against Yūto's ability to create illusions called "Coup d'Etat Faker". Yūto wins the practice match with a single strike of his scythe. When Eruna and Seisa have their practice match, Eruna's Toy Gun fails to activate while Seisa's ability to reshape space called "Killing Art" overwhelms Eruna. Now that Eruna has been kicked out of the Going-Home Club, Kyōma informs Eruna that she needs more experience to properly utilize her ability. Bimii suggests for Eruna to form her own club by using the rookie tournament to attract potential members. At night, a determined Eruna is invited by an admired Seisa to sleep at her mansion.
4	"Apathetic Coup d'Etat" "Mukiryoku Kūdetā" (無気力クーデター)	April 27, 2015
Yūto recalls that he was separated from his cheerful younger brother when their parents divorced. In the morning, Eruna struggles to properly activate her Toy Gun in a practice match against Himi. The Drama Club, whose members include Yūto, Nyamirin, Usamaru, Tonkyun and Kumano, decide to hold an after-school beginner's class for Eruna in preparation for the rookie tournament. While Eruna and the Drama Club eat some stamina pork bowls, Yūto abruptly leaves when Usamaru talks about a show called Super Miracle Man. As Shigure announces the brackets of the rookie tournament, Eruna learns that she will be facing against Meika, now a member of the Calligraphy Club, in the first round. Meanwhile, Yūto vaguely tells Seisa that he is depressed because Asuhi reminds him of his younger brother. Later on, Eruna and the Drama Club hold a sleepover party for Yūto in order to mark the end of the after-school beginner's class. The next day, Yūto admits that Asuhi reminds him of his younger brother. During the first round, Eruna excitedly enjoys the duel against Meika, whose ability called "Cutie Ink" is somewhat similar to Himi's Lovely Ink. Eruna manages to activate her Toy Gun and win the match.
5	"School Fantasia" "Gakuen Fantajia" (学園ファンタジア)	May 4, 2015
While visiting the festival booths, Eruna and Seisa end up filling in for Sadamatsu, who is running a shooting gallery for his life-size Super Miracle Man action figure up for grabs. Yūto and Eruna fail to even budge the action figure, due to Sadamatsu's ability to manipulate plant life called "Selfish Flower". Seisa knocks down and wins Sadamatsu's nautilus plushie, which attracts more attention to the shooting gallery. As Yūto leaves, Eruna then hangs out with Usamaru and Tonkyun, who both cleared the first round. Seisa finds Kyōma at a crêpe booth. Eruna, Usamaru and Tonkyun learn that Haruka Toishi, representative of the Broadcast Club, is currently ranked second among other contenders. After Usamaru learns that Azumi Sagara, ace of the Brass Club, is currently ranked fifth, he is conflicted upon realizing that she is his next opponent. Eruna, Usamaru and Tonkyun pass by a portrait painting booth, while Kyōma observes that Seisa has recently become more social. After clearing the second round, Eruna witnesses Usamaru being overwhelmed by Azumi's ability to manipulate gravity by playing a musical note on her trumpet called "Molto Accento". When Azumi wins the match, Seisa harshly reacts from the sidelines and walks away.
6	"Junk Innocence" "Garakuta Inosensu" (我楽多イノセンス)	May 11, 2015
Kyōma begins to lose his passion for painting. After a pep rally is held for Eruna, she learns that both Shigure and Kyōma transferred to Mikagura Private Academy as sophomores from a sister school revolved around sports clubs, where it is revealed that Kyōma became distrustful of his peers. Eruna visits Kyōma at the Art Club after she progresses further in the rookie tournament. Later on, Eruna and Usamaru witness a match between Tonkyun and Azumi. Tricking Azumi into approaching him up close, Tonkyun takes advantage of the weakness of her Molto Accento, which cannot be performed continuously. Tonkyun uses his ability to make flames burst from his hands called "Ad Lib Role" in order to change his hammer into two flaming swords, allowing him to win the fourth round. Eruna faces against Tonkyun in the fifth round, where Eruna announces her plans to start the "Surrounding Eruna Ichinomiya with Cute Girls Club". As the two clash, Eruna discovers her second ability called "Toy Bayonet", a bayonet made out of light. She wins the match, reigniting Kyōma's passion for painting. After Eruna loses against Haruna in the quarterfinals, Asuhi is defeated by Otone Fujishiro in the finals.
7	"Izayoi Seeing" "Izayoi Shīingu" (十六夜シーイング)	May 18, 2015
Seisa reminisces about a former female upperclassman. Otone abruptly walks out when Shigure announces her as the winner of the rookie tournament. Eruna goes to the flower garden and takes an interest in Otone, who appears to be just as crazy as Eruna. Inspired by Asuhi's ambitions to have a rematch with Otone someday, Eruna dedicates herself in forming her own club. The Drama Club decide to hold a party for Asuhi in order to cheer him up from his defeat. Eruna invites Shigure, Himi, Meika, Sadamatsu, Kyōma, Otone and Seisa. Exhausted from escorting Eruna, Bimii mixes up Asuhi's party invitation held at night with Eruna's message about the venue changed to the school rooftop. As such, Eruna misinterprets Asuhi's party invitation as a letter of challenge, almost initiating a match against Sadamatsu before Asuhi shows up. When a thunderstorm suddenly appears, everyone waits at the stairwell for the rain to stop. Asuhi explains that he previously wished on a falling star three times in order to become strong enough to face his former bullies. Otone witnesses Seisa secretly using her Killing Art in order to stop the rain and give Asuhi a rooftop party under the starry sky.
8	"Unidentified Treasure" "Mikakunin Torejā" (未確認トレジャー)	May 25, 2015
Eruna struggles to recruit new members for her "Surrounded By Girls Club". Shigure hosts the annual treasure hunt, in which all freshmen will participate in pairs. As the event starts, Eruna and Otone are selected as pairs, soon assisted by a Mecha Bimii. With the Drama Club managing each checkpoint, Eruna clears Yūto's ultra quiz, Kumano's arm wrestling match and Nyamirin's vision test. After Eruna runs into Sadamatsu and Kyōma at the rest station, Otone runs off into a cave after expressing disinterest in the treasure hunt. While searching for Otone, Eruna injures herself after falling off a cliff. Otone finds Eruna, taking her to a secret log cabin in order to treat her injured leg and have some tea. Mecha Bimii soon transforms into a giant robot and goes on a rampage. Otone creates a bridge by using her ability to shapeshift her ribbons into any form called "Anticomplex", while Eruna uses her Toy Gun to vanquish Mecha Bimii. Surprisingly, Usamaru and Azumi win the treasure hunt, and the prize is a manga personally created by Shigure. Afterwards, Otone agrees to help Eruna form her club. Having spied on Eruna and Otone, Seisa grows concerned after witnessing Otone's Anticomplex.
9	"Derailed Scandal" "Dassen Sukyandaru" (脱線スキャンダル)	June 1, 2015
Eruna and Otone try to sneak their club promotion into fake rumors reported by the Newspaper Club. Unable to convince the Drama Club of joining, Eruna learns from Bimii that she is given until the upcoming midterm battles in order to find a third member. Eruna struggles to find potential members, while Otone inadvertently scares them away with her Anticomplex in the form of snakes. Otone admits her fear of losing Eruna if a third member came between them. As Eruna and Otone stumble upon an empty classroom as a potential clubroom, Eruna is challenged to a match by Rumina over the rights to use the clubroom. Rumina uses her ability to mentally damage opponents by reading embarrassing scoops from a book called "Secret Memories". Before Eruna is completely defeated by hearing her embarrassing childhood memories involving Shigure, Otone uses her Anticomplex in the form of earplugs for Eruna, allowing Eruna to use her Toy Gun in order to defeat Rumina. Thanks to Bimii temporarily transforming into his human form in order to act as the third member, Eruna gets her "I'll Figure It Out Later Club" recognized and gains permission to use the clubroom.
10	"Sleeping Bag Haunting" "Nebukuro Hōntingu" (寝袋ホーンティング)	June 8, 2015
Eruna moves out of Seisa's mansion and brings her sleeping bag into her new clubroom alongside Otone. Himi, Meika, Sadamatsu, Shigure, Yūto, Asuhi and Kyōma bring housewarming gifts for Eruna and Otone. Rumina requests Eruna to go ghost hunting on school grounds at night in order to confirm a rumor. Eruna, Yūto, Nyamirin, Usamaru, Tonkyun and Meika travel to Eruna's old dorm room and eventually discover that the rumored ghost sighting was most likely Eruna wandering around in her sleeping bag at night. Bimii pretends to be the ghost in order to fool Rumina, but he soon gets trapped inside a mysterious void. Meanwhile, Otone goes to Seisa's mansion and confronts Seisa for her selfish refusal to support Eruna's club. Kyōma warns Eruna that Seisa and Otone are about to fight. During the battle, Seisa finds herself unable to use her Killing Art when Otone uses her Anticomplex to push Seisa further into a corner. Eruna arrives in the nick of time and stops Otone from attacking Seisa.
11	"Nostalgic Triangle" "Tsuioku Toraianguru" (追憶トライアングル)	June 15, 2015
After Otone ashamedly runs off, Eruna shockingly notices some strange scars on Seisa's back. At the flower garden on the following day, Eruna asks Otone to help her train for the upcoming midterm battles after Otone believes that Eruna should be the club representative. When the brackets for the midterm battles are posted, it is learned that Seisa withdrew from participation and shut herself in her mansion. As Eruna wins the first round against Haruka, Kurumi witnesses Seisa's Killing Art becoming unstable as temporary cracks begin appearing throughout the school. Eruna and Otone investigate the abandoned clubroom of the Photography Club, where Eruna stumbles onto a different dimension and comes across Bimii inside the darkroom. Bimii reveals that when Seisa was a freshman in the Art Club, she was unexpectedly betrayed and seriously injured by the female upperclassman of the Photography Club during an unauthorized battle before the official match, prompting Seisa to use her Killing Art in order to seal the clubroom away. With Seisa's Killing Art growing even more unstable by the minute, the school starts warping after an intense match between Shigure and Kyōma. Eruna and Bimii fall through a sudden crack in the abandoned clubroom.
12	"Infinite Grand Finale" "Mugendai Fināre" (無限大フィナーレ)	June 22, 2015
A vision of ancestors resembling Eruna, Seisa and Shigure is briefly shown. With the combined effort of Kyōma's painting ability called "Palette Barrett" and Shigure's midair platform ability called "Hero Time", they save Eruna from falling when she winds back in the real world, where the school is in ruins. Shigure explains that the three ancestors founded Mikagura Private Academy, stating that Eruna's ancestor gave Eruna her powers so that she could help Seisa. Rushing over to Seisa's mansion, Eruna manages to enter Seisa's bedroom with Sadamatsu's assistance. Eruna wagers that if she wins the midterm battles, then Seisa must join the I'll Figure It Out Club. Afterwards, Eruna passes by an altar in order to give thanks to her ancestor. Eruna and Kyōma each advance to the finals after defeating their respective opponents Himi and Sadamatsu. However, the Drama Club arrange for Kyōma to be replaced by Seisa. With Seisa regaining control of her power from the enjoyment of the battle, both Eruna and Seisa bring out their full power against each other. After the match ends in a draw, Seisa decides to join the I'll Figure It Out Club, which Eruna renames as the "After School Paradise Club".
