= My Sweet Tyrant =

Japanese manga series

- The cover of the first manga volume, featuring Akkun (left and right) and Nontan (center)

あっくんとカノジョ (Akkun to Kanojo)
- Genre: Romantic comedy
- Manga
- Written by: Waka Kakitsubata
- Published by: Media Factory
- Magazine: Monthly Comic Gene
- Original run: June 2013 – June 2018
- Volumes: 8
- Audio drama
- Produced by: Media Factory
- Released: December 2016
- Episodes: 1
- Anime television series
- Directed by: Shin Katagai
- Written by: Yuka Yamada
- Studio: Yumeta Company
- Licensed by: Crunchyroll (streaming)
- Original network: AT-X, Tokyo MX
- Original run: April 6, 2018 – September 21, 2018
- Episodes: 25

My Sweet Tyrant (Japanese: あっくんとカノジョ, Hepburn: Akkun to Kanojo; lit. "Akkun and His Girlfriend") is a romantic comedy manga series written and illustrated by Waka Kakitsubata. It began serialization in Media Factory's Monthly Comic Gene magazine from June 2013 to June 2018. An anime television series adaptation by Yumeta Company aired from April 6 to September 21, 2018.

== Plot ==
Atsuhiro "Akkun" Kagari is known to be harsh towards his girlfriend Non "Nontan" Katagiri, but is secretly infatuated with her, regularly following her and watching over her like a stalker. The series follows their interactions with each other as well as their classmates.

== Characters ==
Atsuhiro "Akkun" Kagari (荘 敦大, Kagari Atsuhiro)
Voiced by: Jun Fukuyama (drama CD), Tatsuhisa Suzuki (anime)
Title character of the series. He has dark blonde hair. He's a Tsundere who really loves Nontan. In front of Nontan, he always shows his "Tsun" side and hides his "Dere" side. His feelings towards her are secretly quite intense, to the point of occasionally resembling a stalker.
Non "Nontan" Katagiri (片桐 のん, Katagiri Non)
Voiced by: Aoi Yūki (drama CD), Ayaka Suwa (anime)
Akkun's girlfriend. She has shoulder-length black hair. She's a Deredere who really loves Akkun. In front of Akkun, she always shows her "Dere" side. Akkun's Tsundere personality doesn't bother her.
Masago Matsuo (松尾 真砂, Matsuo Masago)
Voiced by: Nobuhiko Okamoto (drama CD), Keisuke Ueda (anime)
Akkun's best friend. He has dark blue hair. He knows about Akkun's and Chiho's Tsundere personalities. He's a serious game otaku who frequently comes to Akkun's house to play gal games on his TV, much to Chiho's frustration.
Chiho Kagari (荘 千穂, Kagari Chiho)
Voiced by: Maaya Uchida (drama CD), Arisa Kōri (anime)
Akkun's younger sister, presently in the eighth grade. Like her brother, she has dark blonde hair, which is tied into a ponytail that reaches her arms. Also like her brother, she's a Tsundere who really loves Nontan, but unlike Akkun, her love is more friendly than romantic. Unlike her brother, in front of Nontan, she always shows her "Dere" side and hides her "Tsun" side. On the other hand, she appears to demonstrate a growing romantic attraction toward Matsuo. At first, she consistently shows only her "Tsun" while fighting to hide her "Dere", but this becomes progressively harder to do.
Takumi Kubomura (窪村 匠, Kubomura Takumi)
Voiced by: Wataru Hatano (anime)
Akkun's teacher. He has brown hair. He is a serious and world-weary man. He is often the target of Konagi's antics.
Konagi Irie (入江 小凪, Irie Konagi)
Voiced by: Hikaru Kayou (anime)
Akkun's classmate. She has pink hair. She is an annoying and air-headed girl who is an optimist to a fault. She has a passionate crush on Kubomura.

== Media ==
=== Manga ===
Waka Kakitsubata launched the manga in Media Factory's josei manga magazine Monthly Comic Gene in June 2013. The manga is also serialized on Media Factory's Pixiv based web magazine Gene Pixiv. Eight tankōbon volumes have been released to date.

==== Volumes ====
| No. | Japanese release date | Japanese ISBN |
|---|---|---|
| 1 | February 27, 2014 | 978-4-04-066289-3 |
| 2 | September 27, 2014 | 978-4-04-066863-5 |
| 3 | May 27, 2015 | 978-4-04-067527-5 |
| 4 | January 27, 2016 | 978-4-04-067890-0 |
| 5 | August 27, 2016 | 978-4-04-068516-8 |
| 6 | March 27, 2017 | 978-4-04-069101-5 |
| 7 | November 27, 2017 | 978-4-04-069528-0 |
| 8 | June 27, 2018 | 978-4-04-069908-0 |

=== Drama CD ===
An audio drama CD was released by Media Factory in December 2016.

=== Anime ===
An anime adaptation was announced via a wraparound band on the seventh volume of the manga on November 27, 2017. The television series is directed by Shin Katagai and written by Yuka Yamada, with animation by Yumeta Company. Character designs are provided by Motohiro Taniguchi. The series aired from April 6 to September 21, 2018, on AT-X as a short-form series with 4-minute episodes. The first opening theme is "Koi no Balloon" (恋のバルーン, Love's Balloon) by Haruna Ōshima. The second opening theme is "We☆Pace!" by Haruna Ōshima feat. Ebisu coffret. Crunchyroll streamed the series.

| No. | Title (Note: All English titles are taken from Crunchyroll.) | Original release date |
|---|---|---|
| 1 | "The Boyfriend's True Nature" "Kareshi no Jittai" (Japanese: 彼氏の実態) | April 6, 2018 |
Atsuhiro "Akkun" Kagari is crazily in love with his girlfriend Non "Nontan" Katagiri. However, instead of showing his feelings, he hides them under a tsundere mask and prefers to store her photos and voice in his phone.
| 2 | "The Accustomed Girlfriend" "Tenareta Kanojo" (Japanese: 手慣れた彼女) | April 13, 2018 |
Akkun's best friend Masago Matsuo asks Nontan if she is really okay with a boyfriend who only spouts cruel words at her, but Nontan reveals that she knows Akkun doesn't mean what he says and believes he loves her. The next day, Akkun decides to walk home with her and gathers up his courage to hug her, although he ignores her out of embarrassment for three days after. A similar situation occurs after he kisses her, only he skips school for five days instead.
| 3 | "Number of Chews" "Soshaku kaisū" (Japanese: 咀嚼回数) | April 20, 2018 |
Akkun reveals to his younger sister Chiho Kagari on how he has perfectly calculated Nontan's eating habits, including her average number of chews per food item. While Chiho is absolutely disgusted with her older brother's stalker tendencies, she is likewise smitten with Nontan and doesn't hesitate in showing her hospitality, although she hides her own feelings as well.
| 4 | "The Beginning Of It All" "Subete no Hajimari" (Japanese: 全ての始まり) | April 27, 2018 |
Akkun recalls how he first started dating Nontan in middle school, where they gave each other their nicknames. After which, Nontan's mother gave him his first photo of her, and from there he started a habit of taking secret photos of Nontan and pasting them all over his room walls and ceiling. Nontan has no idea of his habit though.
| 5 | "Under the Umbrella Together" "Aiaigasa" (Japanese: 相合い傘) | May 4, 2018 |
Nontan visits Akkun's house after school on a rainy day. They watch a scary movie together with Chiho and Masago, who is always there playing dating sims because his console at home is currently broken. When Akkun goes to the kitchen to get Masago some coffee, he is followed by Nontan, and realises that she knows the location of items in his house, much to his delight as it makes them somewhat like a married couple.
| 6 | "The Parents" "Ryōshin-tachi" (Japanese: 両親たち) | May 11, 2018 |
Akkun goes over to Nontan's place for dinner, meeting her parents Seichiro and Tsugumi for the first time. The couple has a striking resemblance to Akkun and Nontan's dynamics in their relationship. When Akkun's parents Keita and Sakurako arrive to pick their son up, Nontan realises how Sakurako is similar to her mother but Keita is the opposite of her father with his clueless and boyish attitude.
| 7 | "Irie-san" "Irie-san" (Japanese: 入江さん) | May 18, 2018 |
Homeroom teacher Takumi Kubomura is having a hard time dealing with Konagi Irie, a cheerful female student that is utterly smitten with him. Both are utterly clueless: Takumi with Konagi's feelings for him and Konagi with Takumi's job as a teacher that she believes is him trying to spend time together with her. When he overhears Akkun saying mean things to Nontan despite them being dating, he questions Akkun about his feelings for his girlfriend, which are that of a pure-hearted young love. Wishing to understand and educate his students, he requests that Akkun say mean things to him in hopes of putting himself into Nontan's shoes.
| 8 | "His Own Way of Studying" "Kare-nari no benkyō-hō" (Japanese: 彼なりの勉強法) | May 25, 2018 |
Akkun advises Nontan to remember information by reading her notes out loud, where during this time he records her voice and uses her recitations to study himself. After the test, Nontan invites Akkun out on a date to the beach for the summer holidays. Meanwhile, Konagi is annoyed as she failed the test on purpose but her makeup class isn't going to be taught by Takumi.
| 9 | "Matsuo and Chiho" "Matsuo to Chiho" (Japanese: 松尾と千穂) | June 1, 2018 |
Chiho is annoyed at how Masago has pretty much made the Kagari family residence his home by constantly playing dating sims there. Both of them grow close as she starts showing her own tsundere side to him as well.
| 10 | "Beach Time" | June 8, 2018 |
| 11 | "The Night of the Festival" "Matsuri no Yoru" (Japanese: 祭りの夜) | June 15, 2018 |
| 12 | "Candy Apple Hammer" "Ringo ame hanmā" (Japanese: リンゴ飴ハンマー) | June 22, 2018 |
| 13 | "Memories" "Omoide hanashi" (Japanese: おもひで話) | June 29, 2018 |
| 14 | "Halloween" "Harowin" (Japanese: ハロウィン) | July 6, 2018 |
| 15 | "Wishes, Apathy, and Supremacy" "Ganbō • mu kandō • shikō" (Japanese: 願望・無感動・至高) | July 13, 2018 |
| 16 | "Matsuo Countermeasures" "Matsuo taisaku" (Japanese: 松尾対策) | July 20, 2018 |
| 17 | "Akkun's Sleepover" "Akkun no o tomari kai" (Japanese: あっくんのお泊り会) | July 27, 2018 |
| 18 | "Christmas" "Kurisumasu ☆" (Japanese: クリスマス☆) | August 3, 2018 |
| 19 | "Happy New Year" "Kinga shinnen" (Japanese: 謹賀新年) | August 10, 2018 |
| 20 | "Clean Up Activities" "Bika katsudō" (Japanese: 美化活動) | August 17, 2018 |
| 21 | "Honest Words" "Chokkyū no Kotoba" (Japanese: 直球の言葉) | August 24, 2018 |
| 22 | "Startline" "Sutātorain" (Japanese: スタートライン) | August 31, 2018 |
| 23 | "Green Onion Plushie" "Negi ningyō" (Japanese: ネギ人形) | September 7, 2018 |
| 24 | "Hate..." "Kirai..." (Japanese: キライ．．．) | September 14, 2018 |
| 25 | "My Sweet Tyrant" "Akkun to Kanojo" (Japanese: あっくんとカノジョ) | September 21, 2018 |

== Reception ==
The manga had sold over 480 thousand copies and had over 11 million views on Pixiv, as of November 2017.
