= Magical Warfare =

Japanese light novel and anime series

- First light novel volume cover featuring the character Mui Aiba

魔法戦争 (Mahou Sensou)
- Genre: Adventure, fantasy, romance
- Light novel
- Written by: Hisashi Suzuki
- Illustrated by: Lunalia
- Published by: Media Factory
- Imprint: MF Bunko J
- Original run: November 25, 2011 – September 25, 2015
- Volumes: 12
- Manga
- Written by: Hisashi Suzuki
- Illustrated by: You Ibuki
- Published by: Media Factory
- Magazine: Monthly Comic Gene
- Original run: April 15, 2013 – June 15, 2015
- Volumes: 6
- Anime television series
- Directed by: Yūzō Satō
- Written by: Kazuyuki Fudeyasu
- Music by: Masato Kōda
- Studio: Madhouse
- Licensed by: AUS: Madman Entertainment; NA: Sentai Filmworks; SEA: Muse Communication
- Original network: TBS, MBS, CBC, BS-TBS
- English network: SEA: Animax Asia; US: Anime Network
- Original run: January 9, 2014 – March 27, 2014
- Episodes: 12
- icon

Magical Warfare (Japanese: 魔法戦争, Hepburn: Mahō Sensō) is a Japanese light novel series written by Hisashi Suzuki and illustrated by Lunalia. Twelve volumes have been published by Media Factory since November 25, 2011, under their MF Bunko J label. A manga adaptation by You Ibuki started serialization in the manga magazine Monthly Comic Gene on April 15, 2013, and Kadokawa made the English digital volumes available on BookWalker on October 29, 2015. A 12-episode anime television series adaptation produced by Madhouse originally aired between January 9 and March 27, 2014.

== Plot ==
Takeshi Nanase is an ordinary high school student who has a somewhat dark and troubled past. On his way to kendo practice, he comes across a girl named Mui Aiba in a school uniform he never saw before. After being nursed back to health by Takeshi, instead of thanking him, she accidentally turns him into a magician.

Takeshi's encounter with Mui results in his friends Kurumi Isoshima and Kazumi Ida also becoming magicians, and the three learn the current world is actually split into two - the world they live in, and the world of magicians. Mui is a magician enrolled in the Subaru Magic Academy, where many magicians can learn to control their powers and live in peace with regular humans, and whenever necessary protect humanity from magicians with malevolent intent. Instead of returning to the real world, Takeshi decides to enroll into the academy as well, and so his friends follow suit.

These three friends are fighting for different reasons, either to escape their turbulent past or to catch up to the future. They possess different abilities which they must learn to harness in order to fend off the Ghost Trailers, a group of magicians who seek to use violence to assert their superiority over humans. Takeshi and his friends must strive to become stronger and must face the Ghost Trailers' leader in order to prevent the Second Great Magic War from taking place.

== Characters ==
=== Main characters ===
Takeshi Nanase (七瀬 武, Nanase Takeshi)
Voiced by: Mamoru Miyano (Japanese); Gabriel Regojo (English)
The male protagonist. A high school freshman, he is talented in kendo with a serious personality. Takeshi has a cold relationship with his family and pretends to be in a relationship with his childhood friend Kurumi. This relationship is one of the main sources of conflict between him and his younger brother, Gekkō. Since the beginning of middle school, he has chosen not to call Kurumi by her first name, instead referring to her "Isoshima-san", which is considered to be too polite for people who have known each other as long as they have. Takeshi became a magician after Mui unintentionally exposed him to magic shortly after they first met. Rather than return to the Real World with their magic sealed away permanently, he, along with Kurumi and Ida, chooses to become a magician and enrolls in Subaru Magic Academy. His magic is Evasive-type and his Aspect (the tool that acts as a focus through which magicians project their power) is a type of gun sword with the approximate length and weight of a kendo sword, that was named "Twilight" by its previous owner, one of the 15 'Great Magicians'. He loses his sword after the first fight with Gekkō. He appears to feel a great deal of affection for Kurumi, although not to the same extent as she does for him, and seems to be marginally aware of Mui's feelings for him, and recalled the promise about breaking off the fake relationship with Kurumi if they ever found a person they truly love while staring directly at Mui.
Mui Aiba (相羽 六, Aiba Mui)
Voiced by: Nao Tōyama (Japanese); Allison Sumrall (English)
One of the female protagonists. A magician who was found by Takeshi when she collapsed on the school grounds, and unintentionally turned him into magician by exposing him to magic. She uses Acceleration magic and is trying to release her older brother from Trailer's influence. When Takeshi and his friends enroll in Subaru Magic Academy, Mui is transferred to Class C as punishment, even though she is S-class in both theory and practical magic. Her Aspect is a gun she named "Arthur" and has had feelings for Takeshi ever since they kissed in the school infirmary.
Kurumi Isoshima (五十島 くるみ, Isoshima Kurumi)
Voiced by: Asami Seto (Japanese); Sara Ornelas (English)
The other female protagonist. Kurumi is Takeshi's childhood friend and his fake girlfriend. She became a magician during the confrontation between Takeshi and the magicians from Trailer and gained Transformation magic. Her Aspect is a lipstick.
She is a beautiful girl and has been admired ever since she was young. From the time she entered middle school she was confessed to by numerous boys including, disturbingly, university students. After a traumatizing experience with a stalker, she asked Takeshi, whom she considered to be the only boy she could trust, to pretend to be her boyfriend to keep other boys away from her. This arrangement was to last until either of them found someone they truly love. Despite pretending to be in a relationship with Takeshi, she has genuine feelings for him and wishes to become a real couple.
As the story progresses, her traumatic past involving Takeshi and Gekkō, her complex relationship with them, and the affections Takeshi, Gekkō, and Takao Oigami all harbor toward her serve to move the plot forward. Kurumi later becomes Takeshi's reason for developing his abilities so that he can fight all-out against Gekkō. Kazuma Ryuusenji, Trailer's leader, entrusts her with important truths.
Kazumi Ida (伊田 一三, Ida Kazumi)
Voiced by: Kenichi Suzumura (Japanese); Scott Gibbs (English)
Takeshi's friend, who appears to be and acts like a punk with bleached spiky hair, earrings, and skull ring. He is actually softhearted, very carefree, and has a sister complex toward his little sister. He became a magician in the same confrontation as Kurumi and gained Destruction magic, which allows him to produce flames. His Aspect is a ring.

=== Subaru Magic Academy ===
Momoka Shijō (四条 桃花, Shijō Momoka)
Voiced by: Mikako Takahashi (Japanese); Nancy Novotny (English)
A girl who is the headmistress and director of the Academy.
Makoto Hitōji (一氏 誠, Hitōji Makoto)
Voiced by: Takayuki Yamaguchi (Japanese); Mike Yager (English)
Takeshi and friends' homeroom teacher.
Nanami Hyōdō (兵頭 七海, Hyōdō Nanami)
Voiced by: Ayumi Tsunematsu (Japanese); Amelia Fischer (English)
The school nurse, who idolizes Momoka Shijō.
Pops (おやっさん, Oyassan)
Voiced by: Hiroshi Shirokuma (Japanese); Josh Morrison (English)
The Academy's weapons provider.
Violet North (ヴァイオレット・ノース, Baioretto Nōsu)
Voiced by: Atsuko Tanaka (Japanese); Carli Mosier (English)
A corrupt English teacher at the Academy who occasionally tells fortunes. During one of these readings the fortune she tells Kurumi leads to her developing doubts about Takeshi. Violet is revealed to be a member of Trailer, having killed an entire party of magicians from Wizard Brace to keep her identity secret. Kippei refers to her as 'V' and appears to be wary of her magical strength. Her position as a teacher and her fortune telling sideshow allow her to gather information, influence students to either act as Trailer wishes (e.g. by giving out false information, leading them into traps etc.) or join Trailer or to become more susceptible to being influenced by Trailer.

=== Ghost Trailer ===
Gekkō Nanase (七瀬 月光, Nanase Gekkō)
Voiced by: Nobuhiko Okamoto (Japanese); Clint Bickham (English)
Takeshi's younger brother and the main antagonist. He used to be a cheerful and friendly person who got along well with his brother. Both of them practiced kendo and were childhood friends with Kurumi, whom Gekkō was obsessed with. The brothers' relationship soured after Gekkō confronted Takeshi about his new 'relationship' with Kurumi, accusing him of taking advantage of her vulnerable state after the stalker incident. When Takeshi ran after his brother to explain the situation, Gekkō was hit by a car. The accident caused lasting damage to Gekkō's leg and forced him to quit kendo, the one thing he was better at than his older brother. Gekkō's resentment of his brother over Kurumi changed into hatred because he blames his brother for stealing everything from him (first Kurumi, then kendo) and later, after years of mental abuse, "running away" to a new school (Subaru Magic Academy). Gekkō follows Takeshi to Subaru Magic Academy, to his older brother's and Kurumi's surprise, and turns out to be a magician capable of casting very powerful and destructive magic. He became a magician through the intervention of Washizu. During Trailers' attack on the Academy it is revealed that he has a vindictive personality (and has always believed himself to be superior to his brother) and desires above all else to hurt Takeshi and take away everything that he holds dear. Gekkō although loses to Takeshi after the second fight in their hometown and the Gun Sword "Twilight" returns to Takeshi.
Tsuganashi Aiba (相羽 十, Aiba Tsuganashi)
Voiced by: Toshiyuki Morikawa (Japanese); Leraldo Anzaldua (English)
Mui's older brother, whose memories were erased by Ghost Trailers. He is hunting Mui because he has been tasked with bringing her to Ghost Trailers, which is why she fled to the Real World, where she ran into Takeshi and his friends.
Takao Oigami (狼神 鷹雄, Oigami Takao)
Voiced by: Jun Fukuyama (Japanese); Andrew Love (English)
A member of Trailer who has the same kind of Evasive magic as Takeshi. After he and Hotaru were knocked out, they were detained by Subaru Magic Academy. He later forms a close bond with Kurumi, and even calls her by her first name, to the ire of Takeshi (who continues to call her "Isoshima-san").
Hotaru Kumagai (熊谷 蛍, Kumagai Hotaru)
Voiced by: Saki Fujita (Japanese); Juliet Simmons (English)
A female member of Trailer who is often mistaken for a boy, and Oigami's close friend. She was knocked out by Ida and then, together with Takao, detained by Subaru Magic Academy.
Ushiwaka (牛若)
Voiced by: Toshiki Masuda (Japanese); Johnny DeLaCerda (English)
A member of Trailer who lost his magic after he rashly attacked Mui and Kurumi with magic while in the Real World.
Kippei Washizu (鷲津 吉平, Washizu Kippei)
Voiced by: Kazuya Nakai (Japanese); David Wald (English)
He suddenly appears in front of Takeshi and his friends after their battle with Tsuganashi Aiba.
Kazuma Ryuusenji (竜泉寺 和馬, Ryūsenji Kazuma)
Voiced by: Daisuke Namikawa (Japanese); David Matranga (English)
The leader of Ghost Trailer who believes that magicians are superior to normal humans. He has been missing, and hoped to be dead, since he cast the spell 'Last Requiem' during the Great Magic War that took place 16-17 years before the present. He is then revealed to be Takeshi from another timeline that had failed to change the future over and over resulting in an endless paradox of events due to Gekkō coming back to life as Kazuma starting the 1st War over and over.

=== Others ===
Futaba Ida (伊田 二葉, Ida Futaba)
Voiced by: Akane Fujita (Japanese); Brittney Karbowski (English)
Ida's beloved little sister who has reached her rebellious age. Takeshi once saved her from a couple of thugs who were harassing her - something that Ida, who was late arriving on the scene, has never forgotten. She enrolls in the elementary school division of Subaru Magic Academy after an incident between her and Ida during spring break turns her into a magician.
Yōko Nanase (七瀬 陽子, Nanase Yōko)
Voiced by: Ami Nanase (Japanese); Molly Searcy (English)
Takeshi and Gekkō's mother. She has been cold to Takeshi ever since Gekkō's accident. She is keeping secrets about herself and her sons. Yōko was at one time a teacher at Subaru Academy and is one of the 15 "Great Magicians" from Wizard Brace, a community of magicians who believe in peaceful coexistence with normal humans, who split the world in two to prevent 'Last Requiem' from killing all non-magicians.

== Media ==
=== Light novels ===
The first light novel was published on November 25, 2011, by Media Factory under their MF Bunko J imprint. Twelve volumes have been published as of September 25, 2015. (October 2013 merger of companies led to new ISBNs)

| No. | Release date | ISBN |
|---|---|---|
| 1 | November 25, 2011 | 978-4-8401-4305-9 |
| 2 | March 23, 2012 | 978-4-8401-4530-5 |
| 3 | August 24, 2012 | 978-4-8401-4678-4 |
| 4 | December 25, 2012 | 978-4-8401-4937-2 |
| 5 | March 25, 2013 | 978-4-8401-5138-2 |
| 6 | September 25, 2013 | 978-4-8401-5284-6 |
| 7 | January 9, 2014 | 978-4-04-066205-3 |
| 8 | March 25, 2014 | 978-4-04-066378-4 |
| 9 | August 25, 2014 | 978-4-04-066953-3 |
| 10 | January 23, 2015 | 978-4-04-067313-4 |
| 11 | April 24, 2015 | 978-4-04-067472-8 |
| 12 | September 25, 2015 | 978-4-04-067747-7 |

=== Manga ===
A manga adaptation by You Ibuki started serialization in the manga magazine Monthly Comic Gene on April 15, 2013. Media Factory published 6 tankōbon volumes between September 27, 2013 and August 27, 2015.

| No. | Release date | ISBN |
|---|---|---|
| 1 | September 27, 2013 | 978-4-8401-5317-1 |
| 2 | January 9, 2014 | 978-4-04-066241-1 |
| 3 | March 27, 2014 | 978-4-04-066512-2 |
| 4 | August 27, 2014 | 978-4-04-066839-0 |
| 5 | January 27, 2015 | 978-4-04-067254-0 |
| 6 | August 27, 2015 | 978-4-04-067579-4 |

=== Anime ===
It was one of five MF Bunko J light novel anime adaptations announced at Media Factory's Summer School Festival event on July 28, 2013. A 12-episode anime television series adaptation by Madhouse aired from January 9, 2014, to March 27, 2014. The opening song is "Senkō no Prisoner" (閃光のPRISONER) performed by Yuuka Nanri and ending theme song is "Born To Be" by Nano. On January 3, 2014, Crunchyroll announced that it has obtained the streaming rights for USA, Canada, UK, Ireland, South Africa, Australia, and New Zealand. Sentai Filmworks has licensed the anime for digital and home video release in North America. Kadokawa Entertainment also released the series on Blu-ray on April 18, 2014. Aniplex Japan later released the series alongside World Conquest Zvezda Plot on March 19, 2014.

==== Episode list ====
| No. | Title | Directed by | Written by | Original release date |
|---|---|---|---|---|
| 1 | "Midsummer Magical Girl"; Transliteration: "Manatsu no mahō shōjo" (Japanese: 真夏の魔法少女) | Akira Mano | Kazuyuki Fudeyasu | January 9, 2014 |
| 2 | "Another World"; Transliteration: "Mō hitotsu no sekai" (Japanese: もうひとつの世界) | Katsumi Minoguchi | Kazuyuki Fudeyasu | January 16, 2014 |
| 3 | "The Magic Academy and Love Fortunes"; Transliteration: "Majikkuakademī to ai unsei" (Japanese: マジックアカデミーと愛運勢) | Kenichi Yatani | Momoko Murakami | January 23, 2014 |
| 4 | "Mui and Tsuganashi of the Ruined World"; Transliteration: "Hōkai sekai no roku to jū" (Japanese: 崩壊世界の六と十) | Koji Sawai | Sayaka Harada | January 30, 2014 |
| 5 | "Magic Tests and Winter Vacation"; Transliteration: "Mahō shiken to fuyuyasumi" (Japanese: 魔法試験と冬休み) | Shinichi Masaki | Kazuyuki Fudeyasu | February 6, 2014 |
| 6 | "Battle and Recovery"; Transliteration: "Gekitō to dakkan" (Japanese: 激闘と奪還) | Akira Mano | Momoko Murakami | February 13, 2014 |
| 7 | "The Magic Sword's Secret"; Transliteration: "Maken no himitsu" (Japanese: 魔剣の秘密) | Kiyoshi Murayama | Sayaka Harada | February 20, 2014 |
| 8 | "Wizard Brace's Darkness"; Transliteration: "Wizaado Bureisu no Yami" (Japanese: ウィザードブレイスの闇) | Naoyuki Itō | Toshio Ishino | February 27, 2014 |
| 9 | "Prelude to Destruction"; Transliteration: "Hōkai e no jokyoku" (Japanese: 崩壊への序曲) | Yōsuke Hatta | Toshio Ishino | March 6, 2014 |
| 10 | "Vanishing Boundaries"; Transliteration: "Kesareta kyōkai" (Japanese: 消された境界) | Yūzō Satō | Sayaka Harada | March 13, 2014 |
| 11 | "The Battle of Pendragon"; Transliteration: "Pendoragon no kessen" (Japanese: ペンドラゴンの決戦) | Takahiro Majima | Momoko Murakami | March 20, 2014 |
| 12 | "Gone From This World"; Transliteration: "Sekai kara no shōshitsu" (Japanese: 世界からの消失) | Akira Mano | Momoko Murakami | March 27, 2014 |

== Reception ==
The anime series has been met with overwhelmingly negative reviews.

Nicole MacLean of THEM Anime Reviews found several problems with the show, among them being the bland characters, poorly constructed plot, and the cliffhanger ending. She concludes that "the laziness and incompetence on display throughout are just depressing to witness."

Original author Hisashi Suzuki was hesitant about the anime and divulged mixed feelings but said he found the anime to be "fairly interesting."
