= Of the Red, the Light, and the Ayakashi =

Japanese visual novel and manga series

- The cover of the first volume of the manga.

あかやあかしやあやかしの (Aka ya Akashi ya Ayakashi no)
- Genre: Dark fantasy
- Video game
- Developer: HaccaWorks*
- Music by: Akiko Shikata
- Genre: Visual novel
- Platform: PC Game; PlayStation Portable; Nintendo Switch
- Released: Windows: JP: May 3, 2011; PlayStation Portable: JP: February 13, 2014; Nintendo Switch: WW: February 29, 2024
- Manga
- Written by: HaccaWorks*
- Illustrated by: Nanao
- Published by: Media Factory
- English publisher: NA: Yen Press
- Magazine: Monthly Comic Gene
- Original run: 15 February 2012 – 15 June 2016
- Volumes: 10

Of the Red, the Light, and the Ayakashi (Note: Japanese: あかやあかしやあやかしの, Hepburn: Aka ya Akashi ya Ayakashi no; also known as AkaAka) is a Japanese visual novel developed by HaccaWorks*. The game has been adapted into a manga by Nanao, serialized in Media Factory's Monthly Comic Gene and published in English by Yen Press.

== Synopsis ==
A boy named Yue is born and raised in a Shinto shrine on a mountain at the outskirts of Utsuwa, forbidden to leave the shrine and see the outside world. One day, he goes with his childhood friend, a black fox named Kurogitsune, to the town's winter festival. Most people look like shadows to Yue, expect for two mysterious boys. After returning to the mountain, the owner of the shrine Mikoto tells him to prepare the "meal".

== Characters ==
Yue (由)
Voiced by: Shinnosuke Tachibana
Kurogitsune (黒狐)
Voiced by: Kei Shindō
Togo Tsubaki (灯吾椿, Tsubaki Tōgo)
Voiced by: Takahiro Mizushima
Tochika Akiyoshi (秋良, Akiyoshi Tochika)
Voiced by: Takahiro Sakurai
Mikoto (ミコト)
Voiced by: Sawashiro Miyuki
Sagano (嵯峨野)
Voiced by: Toriumi Kousuke
His real name is Akashi Tsubaki.
Satou (狭塔)
Shin (シン)

== Media ==
=== Game ===
The original visual novel was released as a PC game on 3 May 2011. It was created by the dōjin group HaccaWorks*, a group consisting of Kanan Misaki, Mizuki Satoru, Yumi Riku, Yumekagami Misaki, and Warabe Yuta. The theme song, "Aka Kakushi" (朱隠し), was performed by Akiko Shikata of Frontier Works. It was later re-released for PlayStation Portable in 2014 with added voice acting. The game was published internationally on the Nintendo Switch by Dramatic Create, a brand of HuneX, under the name Of the Red, the Light, and the Ayakashi Tsuzuri (Note: Japanese: あかやあかしやあやかしの 綴, Hepburn: Aka ya Akashi ya Ayakashi no Tsuzuri) on February 29, 2024.

=== Manga ===
A manga adaptation by Nanao was serialized in Media Factory's Monthly Comic Gene from 15 February 2012 to 15 June 2016. The series is licensed for English publication in North America by Yen Press.

==== Volumes ====
No.	Original release date	Original ISBN	English release date	English ISBN
1	27 July 2012	978-4-04-066262-6	15 December 2015	978-0-316-35196-6
2	26 January 2013	978-4-04-066263-3	22 March 2016	978-0-316-31007-9
3	27 July 2013	978-4-04-066264-0	28 June 2016	978-0-316-31014-7
4	27 January 2014	978-4-04-066256-5	27 September 2016	978-0-316-31017-8
5	27 August 2014	978-4-04-066841-3	20 December 2016	978-0-316-31021-5
6	27 January 2015	978-4-04-067252-6	21 March 2017	978-0-316-31024-6
7	27 July 2015	978-4-04-067566-4	20 June 2017	978-0-316-47171-8
8	27 January 2016	978-4-04-067891-7	26 September 2017	978-0-316-47235-7
9	27 July 2016	978-4-04-068296-9	19 December 2017	978-0-316-47448-1
10	27 April 2017	978-4-04-069029-2	24 April 2018	978-1-975-30010-4

== See also ==
- Ayakashi
