= Monthly Comic Gene =

Japanese manga magazine

- Cover of the July 2011 issue of Monthly Comic Gene, published by Media Factory on June 15, 2011
- Categories: Shōjo/Josei manga
- Frequency: Monthly
- First issue: July 2011
- Company: Media Factory
- Country: Japan
- Language: Japanese
- Website: Monthly Comic Gene official website

Monthly Comic Gene (月刊コミックジーン, Gekkan Komikku Jiin) is a monthly Japanese manga magazine published by Media Factory since June 15, 2011. It is marketed as a shōnen-styled manga magazine for female readers. It was originally to be published in April 2011, but was delayed by two months as a result of the 2011 Tōhoku earthquake and tsunami.

== Serialized titles ==
- Akaya Akashiya Ayakashi no
- Andromalius
- Angels of Death (Satsuriku no Tenshi)
- Antimagia
- Aoharu Tetsudō
- Aokubi Daion - Nama desu no.
- Apocalypse Alice
- Aquarion Evol
- Associate Professor Akira Takatsuki's Conjecture
- Boku no Tonari ni Ankoku Hakaishin ga Imasu.
- Boku to Senpai no Tekken Kōsai
- Brave 10 S
- Butsuzō no Machi
- Card Master
- The Case Book of Arne
- Cyber Dorothy
- Dokusai Grimoire
- Double Gauge
- Fizon Core
- Gene Metallica: Unbreakable Machine-Doll Re:Acta
- Ginyū Gikyoku Black Bard
- Gundog
- Hirano and Kagiura
- Hoshi o Ō Kodomo: Agartha no Shōnen
- Imasara Nostradamus
- Jijō Ari Undead
- Jūgo Shōnen Hyōryūki
- Kagerou Daze
- Kaizoku Haku
- Kamusari
- Kimi no Chronos
- Kioh x Kioh
- Kuroinu O'Clock
- Kyokō no Ō
- Love of Kill
- Lucky Dog 1 Blast
- M@te!!
- Mahō Sensō
- Makai Ishi Mephisto
- Malicious Code
- Maria Holic Spin-off
- Mikagura Gakuen Kumikyoku
- Mofu Danshi
- My Sweet Tyrant
- Niche Sensei - Konbini ni, Satori Sesai no Shinjin ga Maiorita (ongoing)
- Night Walker
- Nirvana
- Ookami Game
- Ore Alice - Danjo Gyakuten
- Orenchi no Furo Jijō
- Orthoros
- Phantom Tales of the Night
- Rack - 13-kei no Zankoku Kikai
- Ranobe Ōji Seiya
- Rengoku no Karutagura
- Rusted Armors
- Ryū wa Tasogare no Yume o Miru
- Santaku Rose
- Sekimen Danshi Makkasa
- Servamp
- Shinjigen Ascension
- Shūen no Shiori
- Shūjin to Kamihikōki - Shōnen Paradox
- Soko ni Ita no Nishiyama-san
- Tales of Xillia - Side;Milla
- Tenka!
- Toilet no Hanatarō
- Try Knights
- Uta Koi. Ibun - Uta Hen.
- Warui Koto
- Zannen, Koko wa Sekai no Uragawa desu.
- Zenin Chū-2-Byō Gakuen
