= Angels of Death (video game) =

2015 Japanese horror adventure game and its franchise

- First tankōbon volume cover of Angels of Death, featuring Rachel "Ray" Gardner (left) and Isaac "Zack" Foster (right)

殺戮の天使 (Satsuriku no Tenshi)
- Genre: Psychological horror
- Video game
- Developer: Hoshikuzu KRNKRN
- Publisher: Den Fami Nico Game Magazine
- Genre: Adventure
- Engine: RPG Maker VX Ace
- Platform: Microsoft Windows, PlayStation 4, Xbox One, Nintendo Switch, Android, iOS, Steam
- Released: August 14, 2015 (Win); December 20, 2016 (Steam); October 11, 2017 (Android); October 11, 2017 (iOS); June 28, 2018 (NS)
- Manga
- Written by: Makoto Sanada
- Illustrated by: Kudan Nazuka
- Published by: Media Factory
- English publisher: NA: Yen Press
- Magazine: Monthly Comic Gene
- Original run: January 27, 2016 – September 15, 2020
- Volumes: 12
- Manga

Angels of Death Episode.0
- Written by: Makoto Sanada
- Illustrated by: Kudan Nazuka
- Published by: Kadokawa Shoten
- English publisher: NA: Yen Press
- Original run: March 3, 2017 – March 31, 2023
- Volumes: 7
- Manga

Satsuten!
- Written by: Makoto Sanada
- Illustrated by: negiyan
- Published by: Media Factory
- Magazine: Monthly Comic Gene
- Original run: February 27, 2017 – March 27, 2021
- Volumes: 5
- Novel series
- Written by: Kina Chiren, Makoto Sanada
- Illustrated by: negiyan
- Published by: Kadokawa
- Original run: July 30, 2016 – April 27, 2018
- Volumes: 3
- Manga

Angels of Death Art Gallery
- Written by: Makoto Sanada
- Illustrated by: negiyan
- Published by: Kadokawa
- Original run: June 27, 2018 – May 31, 2021
- Volumes: 2
- Anime television series
- Directed by: Kentarō Suzuki
- Produced by: Michihisa Abe; Kozue Kaneniwa; Mitsuhiro Ogata; Terushige Yoshie; Noritomo Isogai; Tomohiko Shigenaga; Seiichi Kawashima; Jōtarō Ishigami; Shōta Tanaka; Yutaka Okada; Yuzuru Satō
- Written by: Yoshinobu Fujioka
- Music by: Noisycroak
- Studio: J.C.Staff
- Licensed by: NA: Crunchyroll; SEA: Plus Media Networks Asia
- Original network: AT-X, Tokyo MX, KBS, TVA, SUN, BS11, TVQ
- English network: SEA: Aniplus Asia
- Original run: July 6, 2018 – October 26, 2018
- Episodes: 16
- icon

Angels of Death (殺戮の天使, Satsuriku no Tenshi; lit. 'Angels of Slaughter') is a Japanese horror adventure game by Hoshikuzu KRNKRN (Makoto Sanada) for Microsoft Windows, PlayStation 4, Xbox One and Nintendo Switch. It was created using RPG Maker and was originally released as freeware via the Den Fami Nico Game Magazine website on August 14, 2015. It launched on Steam in Japanese, Chinese, Korean and English on December 19, 2016.

Two manga adaptations, one based on the game and one on the prequel, written by Makoto Sanada and with art by Kudan Nazuka, began serialization in Media Factory's shōjo manga magazine Monthly Comic Gene in 2015 and Kadokawa Pixiv in 2016, respectively. The first manga has been collected in seven tankōbon volumes and has over one million volumes in print while the prequel has been collected in two volumes. Following the adaptations, a 4-koma manga series titled Satsuten! and the three-volume novel series are published with art by negiyan and written by Kina Chiren.

The manga series was licensed in North America by Yen Press, who published the first volume on November 14, 2017. A 16-episode anime television series adaptation by J.C.Staff began airing from July 6, 2018. A prequel titled Angels of Death Episode.Eddie (殺戮の天使 Episode.Eddie, Satsuriku no Tenshi Episode.Eddie) was released as part of bonuses included in limited edition Blu-ray and DVD boxsets of the anime's first volume.

== Plot ==
13-year-old Rachel "Ray" Gardner is taken to a hospital for counseling after witnessing murder. However she wakes up to find herself on the basement Floor B7 instead with no memories apart from her name and the reason she came to the hospital. A series of mysterious broadcasts and scribbled messages on the wall set the scene as a game where each participant is designated a floor of their own, and anyone who trespasses on another participant's floor has the chance to be killed. Ray, ignorant of the details, is almost killed by serial killer Isaac "Zack" Foster, the owner of Floor B6, and captured by Daniel "Danny" Dickens, the owner of Floor B5 and the doctor who examined her. Danny, who has a maniacal obsession with eyes, desires Rachel's blue, once-blank eyes. During this time, Ray recovers her memory during the night when the murder occurred, just as Zack kills Danny for her, but spares Ray after losing interest in her lack of emotions. As Zack has killed someone that was not on his floor, the broadcast designates him as a "sacrifice" along with Ray, where they can freely be killed by any floor master. The two, now in the same situation, form an alliance where Zack can use her intelligence to escape, and upon doing so will fulfill Ray's desire to be killed by him.

Ray and Zack continue to go to the upper floors to find a way out, defeating the two other floor masters, Edward "Eddie" Mason at B4, a young boy with an unhealthy obsession with graves, and Catherine "Cathy" Ward at B3, a sadomasochistic former jail guard, in the process. When Zack gets injured during the fight against Cathy, Ray encounters a reverend, Abraham Gray, at B2 who reveals himself to be the one who designed the game in order to figure out the definition of "religious faith" in people's hearts, appointing the various floor masters as "angels" that are not afraid to kill without hesitation. Although Gray lets Ray return to B5 to get medicine, she must pass through a trial to determine her identity before she can proceed to the next floor. Meanwhile, back on B2, Zack discovers that Danny is still alive, the latter having faked his death. Ray is forced to confront her selfishness in the trial but survives through it to save Zack, convincing herself that he is her God.

When the duo arrives at B1 though, they come to a house filled with fake flowers and the stitched corpses of a couple, driving Ray hysterical and desperate for Zack to kill her immediately. Danny then tricks Zack into leaving Ray alone in the room and locking it up, forcing Zack to search the floor in order to discover the truth about Ray. With help from Gray, Zack discovers that Ray suffered in the midst of her parents' terrible relationship, and subsequently both were killed, with her father killing her mother, and Ray shooting her father. After this, she stitched their corpses together to form her new "perfect family". While counseling her at the hospital, Danny took an interest in her blank blue eyes and used his authority as an "angel" to bring her to B1, making her the final floor master. However, after discovering a bible, Ray suddenly found herself unable to cope with the realization and guilt of what she had done, believing that no one would accept her after what she did, so she developed suicidal ideations and erased her memory, causing Danny to send her to B7 with the hopes that she would return to her "original self". As Zack finds out the truth, Ray, coming to the realization that Zack won't become the God she desires, shoots Danny and attempts to kill Zack by leading him around the traps of her floor, but he helps her to come to terms with her actions and both renew their oath.

Just as they reach the exit, Danny activates the self-destruct sequence of the building and critically shoots Ray. However, before he can kill Ray and Zack, Gray, having completed his experiment, appears and kills Danny, allowing Zack and Ray to escape just as the building burns down. The police then promptly arrive and Zack lets himself be arrested to save Ray's life as paramedics took her away. After recovering, Ray is taken to a Rehabilitation Center due to her apparent delirium and attachment to Zack. An unspecified amount of time has passed, presumably weeks to a few months after the incident, Zack is sentenced to death.

One night, as Ray prepares to spend the night without sleeping, however, Zack somehow escaped prison and breach the Rehabilitation Center to pick up Ray. Realizing that Zack is still intent on keeping the promise between them, Ray once again implores Zack to kill her as they escape. By the time Ray's caretaker and the police break through the door, Ray and Zack have disappeared, leaving only Zack's knife behind beneath the windowsill.

== Characters ==
=== Main characters ===
Rachel Gardner (レイチェル・ガードナー, Reicheru Gādonā) / Ray (レイ, Rei)
Voiced by: Haruka Chisuga (Japanese); Meg McClain (English)
The 13-year-old female protagonist of the story. After witnessing a murder, she is taken to a hospital for counselling, only to wake up on Floor B7 with no memories from her past. She later recovers them after a scuffle with Danny, the doctor responsible for counselling her, and reverts to an apathetic character. Believing death will be her salvation, she requests Zack's help to kill her in exchange that he can use her intelligence to help him escape the building. Under her emotionless and calm exterior though, Ray harbours a morbid interest in stitching up animals or people she deems imperfect and a twisted perception and blind faith in God.
Her interests stemmed from her parents, who hated each other. Ray then witnessed her father kill her mother, avoiding her by divorce and in terror, killed her own father with a gun, before deciding to stitch up their corpses to turn them into her "perfect" parents. Taken to the hospital, Danny develops an interest in her blank blue eyes and uses his authority to make her the floor master of B1. Ray's floor is modelled after her house and is filled with many deadly traps with the exception of her bedroom and living room where the stitched corpse of her parents is placed.
Isaac Foster (アイザック・フォスター, Aizakku Fosutā) / Zack (ザック, Zakku)
Voiced by: Nobuhiko Okamoto (adult), Ryo Nishitani (child) (Japanese); Dallas Reid (English)
The 20-year-old male protagonist of the story. Once an infamous serial killer, he is now the floor master of B6. He is noticeable for his body being completed covered in bandages and wields a grim-reaper-like scythe. Bloodthirsty, Zack delights in destroying the happiness of his victims and filling them with despair. As Ray showed a severe lack in emotions, he found no interest in killing her and let her stay alive for him to use her intelligence to escape the building, in return that he will kill her once they escape.
Zack grew up only knowing how to kill due to being treated abusively as a child. Abandoned by his parents, but his stepfather tried to burn him and his mother was killed wounding his body with burns that he covered up with bandages and causing him to develop an intense fear of fire. His mother then left him in the care of an illegal orphanage that trafficked children, where he faced subsequently more abusive treatment, becoming a tool of labour; After his mother's death, his stepfather cheated on his mother, who abandoned him.Upon watching a slasher horror movie left by the head of the orphanage, Zack was inspired to go on a murder spree, with the heads of the orphanage being his first victims. He is subsequently found by Gray and became a floor master. His floor is modelled after a deserted, dirty network of alleyways.

=== Supporting characters ===
Daniel Dickens (ダニエル・ディケンズ, Danieru Dikenzu) / Danny (ダニー, Danī)
Voiced by: Takahiro Sakurai (Japanese); Derick Snow (English)
A counsellor who has an insane obsession with eyes, especially Ray's blank, blue ones. Due to being born without a right eye, he was bullied for most of his childhood. His missing eye also caused fights between his parents until they divorced and his mother committed suicide. From there, Danny began to find blank, dead eyes like his mother's beautiful, becoming a counsellor to search for eyes that could satisfy him.
Prior to the series, he was a counsellor for prisoners and met Gray, who offered him the chance to become the floor master of B5. Believing it could satisfy him, Danny took on the offer and subsequently used his authority to bring Ray into Gray's experiment and make her the floor master of B1, hoping that he could live close to her eyes. He is ultimately killed by Gray in his pursuit for Ray. In the prequel manga Episode.0, he becomes the main character.
Edward Mason (エドワード・メイソン, Edowādo Meison) / Eddie (エディ, Edi)
Voiced by: Natsumi Fujiwara (Japanese); Brittney Karbowski (English)
A young boy characterised by his pumpkin mask and love for making graves. His floor is modelled after a graveyard and made completely out of stone. Born a child of grave-makers, Eddie was proud and skilled at his job, but became discontent with the fact that he was never given anything that could truly belong to him, for most of his things were hand-me-downs passed from one child to the next. He then began to kill his pets and bury them in his own graves, feeling that things only truly belonged to him once they were put in graves dug by him.
When he was invited by Grey and became the floor master of B4, he began building graves for those killed by the other floor masters, hardly ever killing anyone himself. However, he took it upon himself to kill Ray and bury her in a beautiful grave after falling in love with her at first sight. Due to constantly building graves in the dark, Eddie got used to seeing in a dark environment, which gives him the advantage when he kills. He is killed by Zack when Ray turns on the lights, and buried in the grave originally meant for her. In the game prequel Episode.Eddie, which focus more on his past before becoming floor master, he becomes the main character.
Catherine Ward (キャサリン・ワード, Kyasarin Wādo) / Cathy (キャシー, Kyashī)
Voiced by: Mariya Ise (Japanese); Jamie Marchi (English)
The floor master of B3, who is known widely as the "Condemner" due to her past as a former jail guard, with Danny as her prisoners' counsellor. A sadomasochistic woman, Cathy delights in uncovering her criminals' crimes and delivering punishment to them through torture, often killing them. Those who survive are then confined as her playthings.
She is the most formidable of all the floor masters due to her wide range of death traps and torture instruments. Viewing Zack as an exemplary sinner, she attempts to punish him thoroughly to her amusement but is killed when Ray catches her off guard with a gun. Her floor is modeled after a huge jail block, along with her private room where she controls the various traps on the rest of the floor and monitors her victims.
Abraham Gray (エイブラハム・グレイ, Eiburahamu Gurei) / Gray (グレイ, Gurei)
Voiced by: Hōchū Ōtsuka
The floor master of B2 and a reverend who created the facility as an experiment to determine the definition of "religious faith", including gathering all the various floor masters and providing them with victims. He is extremely eloquent, able to mesmerise his listeners through words, and harbours a cold and logical heart without mercy. Gray also employs the use of drugs to make his victims hallucinate in order to see their true inner selves. His floor is modelled after a church, with the stained glass window concealing the exit of the building.

=== Other characters ===
Lucy (ルーシー, Rūshī)
A character introduced in the manga adaptations, Lucy is Cathy's best friend who harbours a borderline insane admiration for her. After graduating school together, the both of them became jail guards that specialised in punishing criminals, often with Lucy dealing the finishing blow. When Cathy is invited to become a floor master by Danny, Lucy becomes her first victim, deeming her a sinner as well for all the prisoners she had killed.
Shin (シン, Shin)
A character in Episode.0 and the original floor master of B3 before being replaced by Eddie. Shin was originally a pair of twin brothers who owns a furniture store selling furniture made from human flesh. Deeming that the twins fit the criteria to become an angel for Gray's experiment, Danny invites them. However, Gray would only accept either one of them, deeming their dependency towards each other as imperfect. Driven by the idea that only one being is perfect, each twin decided to kill the other. It is unknown which twin succeeded killing the other as the survivor reappears and reintroduces himself as the "one complete" Shin. In the official Angels of Death guidebook, it is explained that while working on one of his furniture, Shin hurt his hand by accident, causing his blood to stain the furniture. Seeing the beauty in the furniture stained by his own blood, Shin used his own body as ingredients to make the furniture without a care of his own body, which resulted with his death.

== Media ==
=== Manga ===
A manga adaptation by Kudan Nazuka and Makoto Sanada began its serialization on the Monthly Comic Gene magazine on January 27, 2016 and ended its serialization on September 15, 2020. The prequel of the game, Episode.0, also by Kudan Nazuka and Makoto Sanada began its serialization on the MFC Gene Pixiv series on March 3, 2017 and ended its serialization on March 31, 2023. The first volume of a 4-koma manga series titled Satsuten! by Makoto Sanada and negiyan was released on February 27, 2017, and was serialized in the Monthly Comic Gene magazine; the series ended on March 15, 2021.

=== Novel ===
A novelization of the game written by Kina Chiren and Makoto Sanada and illustrated by negiyan is published by Kadokawa label, Enterbrain. The novel series consisted of three volumes.

No.	Title	Release date	ISBN
1	Until Death Do Them Part	July 30, 2016	978-4-04-734115-9
2	Blessing in Disguise	April 24, 2017	978-4-04-734437-2
3	Once in A Blue Moon	April 27, 2018	978-4-04-734930-8

=== Anime ===
A 16-episode anime television series by J.C.Staff premiered on July 6, 2018. The anime is directed by Kentarō Suzuki with scripts overseen by Yoshinobu Fujioka, music composed by Noisycroak at Lantis and character designs handled by Miki Matsumoto who is also serving as chief animation director. Masaaki Endoh performed the opening theme titled "Vital," while Haruka Chisuga (voice of Rachel Gardner) performed the ending theme titled "Pray". The series is also streamed on Crunchyroll with English subtitles, while Funimation produced an English dub for the series and streamed it on their website.

== Reception ==
=== Game ===
Angels of Death has received positive reviews. In a review of the game's PC version, Hardcore Gamer rated it a 4 out of 5, while noting the 'wonderfully odd chemistry' between Rachel and Zack. He prasied the game's creativity, storyline and gameplay, while its brevity, belated character development and low resolution graphics were criticized. Edoardo Carusillo from geekgamer.it rated the game 7.1, he praised the story, gameplay and characterisation, but criticised the art style, saying it was "mediocre and inconsistent". Horror Moth's Sharon shared similar sentiments, while adding the lack of "exaggerated jumpscares" and the "not at all disturbing graphics" would attract players who would otherwise avoid games of its type.

In November 2017, it was announced that the game had achieved over 1 million downloads in Japan.

=== Manga ===
Roundups of the first volume from Anime News Network note that it is short on tension, suspense and horror and somewhat confused in its delivery; its characters seem unnatural and are perhaps more appropriate to a game than to this format; and while the environment art often works well, overall the illustrations do not serve the story.

=== Anime ===
First impressions from Anime News Network were mixed. Some found the pacing to be weak and the writing repetitive and lacking scares, but others praised its episodic structure that strongly pushed the creepiness factor to deliver an intriguing plot. Steve Jones from the same site, on the other hand, gave the anime a more positive review. While he found the early episodes to be a campy romp and criticized the slow pacing, he praised the main characters' growth and interaction and the performance of the voice actors. In Tokyo Anime Award Festival 2019, the anime ranked 72.
