= Free! discography =

- EPs: 3
- Soundtrack albums: 7
- Singles: 23
- Audio drama albums: 6
- Radio albums: 7

Free! is an anime series produced by Kyoto Animation and Animation Do centered on the fictional Iwatobi High School Swim Club, with its first season premiering in 2013. Music for the series is published by Lantis. Since the series' premiere, the show has released 3 extended plays, 7 soundtrack albums, 6 audio drama albums, and 7 radio albums. In addition, 23 singles (8 A-side and 15 character) were released for the series.

The soundtrack is primarily composed by Tatsuya Kato. The show's opening theme songs were performed by Oldcodex. The ending theme songs were performed by Style Five, a tie-in group consisting of Nobunaga Shimazaki, Tatsuhisa Suzuki, Tsubasa Yonaga, Daisuke Hirakawa, and Mamoru Miyano, the voice actors for the main characters of the show (respectively Haruka, Makoto, Nagisa, Rei, and Rin).

== Albums ==
=== Extended plays ===
List of albums, with selected chart positions, sales figures and certifications
Title	Year	Album details	Peak chart positions		Sales	Certifications
Title	Year	Album details	JPN Oricon	JPN Hot (Note: The Billboard Japan Hot Albums did not exist until June 4, 2015.)	Sales	Certifications
Free! Remix Mini Album	2013	Released: October 23, 2013; Label: Lantis; Formats: CD, digital download	29	—N/a	—	—N/a
Free! Dive to the Future: Character Song Mini Album Vol. 1 Seven to High	2018	Released: October 31, 2018; Label: Lantis; Formats: CD, digital download	9	14	JPN: 4,304	—N/a
Free! Dive to the Future: Character Song Mini Album Vol. 2 Close Up Memories	2018	Released: December 26, 2018; Label: Lantis; Formats: CD, digital download	40	52	JPN: 2,445	—N/a
"—" denotes releases that did not chart or were not released in that region.

=== Soundtrack albums ===
List of albums, with selected chart positions, sales figures and certifications
Title	Year	Album details	Peak chart positions		Sales	Certifications
Title	Year	Album details	JPN Oricon	JPN Hot	Sales	Certifications
Free! Original Soundtrack: Ever Blue Sounds	2013	Released: October 2, 2013; Label: Lantis; Formats: CD, digital download	10	—N/a	—	—N/a
Free! Eternal Summer Original Soundtrack: Clear Blue Notes	2014	Released: October 8, 2014; Label: Lantis; Formats: CD, digital download	12	—N/a	—	—N/a
High Speed! Free! Starting Days Original Soundtrack: Pure Blue Scenes	2015	Released: December 16, 2015; Label: Lantis; Formats: CD, digital download	42	—		—N/a
Free! Timeless Medley Original Soundtrack: Bond and Promise	2017	Released: July 31, 2017; Label: Lantis; Formats: CD, digital download	17	22	JPN: 4,581	—N/a
Free! Take Your Marks Original Soundtrack: Bring it In!	2017	Released: November 29, 2017; Label: Lantis; Formats: CD, digital download	42	—	—	—N/a
Free! Dive to the Future Original Soundtrack: Deep Blue Harmony	2018	Released: October 10, 2018; Label: Lantis; Formats: CD, digital download	31	50	JPN: 1,649	—N/a
Free! Road to the Future: Yume Original Soundtrack: Forward Blue Waves	2019	Released: July 10, 2019; Label: Lantis; Formats: CD, digital download	25	27	JPN: 1,963	—N/a
"—" denotes releases that did not chart or were not released in that region.

=== Audio drama albums ===
List of albums, with selected chart positions, sales figures and certifications
Title	Year	Album details	Peak chart positions		Sales	Certifications
Title	Year	Album details	JPN Oricon	JPN Hot	Sales	Certifications
Free! Drama CD: Iwatobi Kōkō Suiei-bu Katsudō Nishi 1 (TVアニメ『Free!』ドラマCD 岩鳶高校水泳部 活動日誌1) (lit. Iwatobi High School Swim Club's Activity Log 1)	2013	Released: August 21, 2013; Label: Lantis; Formats: CD	4	—N/a	—	—N/a
Free! Drama CD: Iwatobi Kōkō Suiei-bu Katsudō Nishi 2 (TVアニメ『Free!』ドラマCD 岩鳶高校水泳部 活動日誌2) (lit. Iwatobi High School Swim Club's Activity Log 2)	2013	Released: September 25, 2013; Label: Lantis; Formats: CD	5	—N/a	—	—N/a
Free! Eternal Summer Drama CD: Iwatobi Samezuka Kōkō Suiei-bu Kōdō Katsudō Nishi 1 (TVアニメ『Free!-Eternal Summer-』ドラマCD 岩鳶・鮫柄水泳部 合同活動日誌1) (lit. Iwatobi High School & Samezuka Academy Swim Club's Joint Activity Log 1)	2014	Released: September 17, 2014; Label: Lantis; Formats: CD	9	—N/a	—	—N/a
Free! Eternal Summer Drama CD: Iwatobi Samezuka Kōkō Suiei-bu Kōdō Katsudō Nishi 2 (TVアニメ『Free!-Eternal Summer-』ドラマCD 岩鳶・鮫柄水泳部 合同活動日誌2) (lit. Iwatobi High School & Samezuka Academy Swim Club's Joint Activity Log 2)	2014	Released: November 26, 2014; Label: Lantis; Formats: CD	12	—N/a	—	—N/a
High Speed! Free! Starting Days Drama CD: Iwatobi Chūgaku Suiei-bu Katsudō Nishi (『映画 ハイ☆スピード!-Free! Starting Days-』ドラマCD「岩鳶中学水泳部 活動日誌」) (lit. Iwatobi Middle School Swim Club's Activity Log)	2016	Released: February 17, 2016; Label: Lantis; Formats: CD	13	26	JPN: 4,962	—N/a
Free! Dive to the Future Drama CD: Extra Short Films (TVアニメ『Free!-Dive to the Future-』ドラマCD Extra Short Films)	2018	Released: December 12, 2018; Label: Lantis; Formats: CD	24	38	JPN: 3,623	—N/a
"—" denotes releases that did not chart or were not released in that region.

=== Radio albums ===
List of albums, with selected chart positions, sales figures and certifications
Title	Year	Album details	Peak chart positions		Sales	Certifications
Title	Year	Album details	JPN Oricon	JPN Hot	Sales	Certifications
Free! Radio CD "Iwatobi Channel": Vol. 1	2013	Released: August 21, 2013; Label: Lantis; Formats: CD	15	—N/a	—	—N/a
Free! Radio CD "Iwatobi Channel": Vol. 2	2013	Released: September 25, 2013; Label: Lantis; Formats: CD	12	—N/a	—	—N/a
Iwatobi Channel ES: Vol. 1	2014	Released: September 17, 2014; Label: Lantis; Formats: CD	16	—N/a	—	—N/a
Iwatobi Channel ES: Vol. 2	2014	Released: November 26, 2014; Label: Lantis; Formats: CD	19	—N/a	—	—N/a
Free! Dive to the Future Radio CD: Fukkatsu! Iwatobi Channel DF Vol. 1 (『Free!-Dive to the Future-』ラジオCD 復活!イワトビちゃんねるDF Vol.1)	2018	Released: September 26, 2018; Label: Lantis; Formats: CD	16	51	JPN: 2,199	—N/a
Free! Dive to the Future Radio CD: Fukkatsu! Iwatobi Channel DF Vol. 2 (『Free!-Dive to the Future-』ラジオCD 復活!イワトビちゃんねるDF Vol.2)	2018	Released: November 28, 2018; Label: Lantis; Formats: CD	50	78	JPN: 1,665	—N/a
Free! Road to the World: Yume: Fukkatsu! Iwatobi Channel RW Radio CD Shucchō-ban (『劇場版 Free!-Road to the World-夢』復活!イワトビちゃんねるRW ラジオCD出張版)	2019	Released: September 11, 2019; Label: Lantis; Formats: CD	18	39	JPN: 2,560	—N/a
"—" denotes releases that did not chart or were not released in that region.

== Singles ==
=== A-side singles ===
List of singles, with selected chart positions, sales figures and certifications
Title	Year	Peak chart positions			Sales	Album
Title	Year	JPN	JPN Hot	JPN Ani.	Sales	Album
Oldcodex
"Rage On"	2013	6	26	6	JPN: 24,281	Non-album single
"Dried Up Youthful Fame"	2014	7	4	2	JPN: 26,009	Non-album single
"Aching Horns"	2015	10	19	3	JPN: 15,106	Non-album single
"Heading to Over"	2018	9	17	6	JPN: 13,646 (physical); JPN: 2,098 (streaming & download)	Non-album single
Style Five (Nobunaga Shimazaki, Tatsuhisa Suzuki, Tsubasa Yonaga, Daisuke Hirakawa, and Mamoru Miyano)
"Splash Free"	2013	8	8	1	—	Non-album single
"Future Fish"	2014	5	3	2	—	Non-album single
"Free-style Spirit"	2017	19 (Note: "Free-style Spirit" and "What Wonderful Days!" were released physically as a double A-side single. The sales count and Oricon ranking reflects both releases combined.)	55	15	JPN: 5,311	Non-album single
"What Wonderful Days!"	2017	19	—	—	JPN: 5,311	Non-album single
"Gold Evolution"	2018	17	34	7	JPN: 8,042 (physical); JPN: 1,395 (streaming & download)	Non-album single
"—" denotes releases that did not chart or were not released in that region.

=== Character singles ===
List of singles, with selected chart positions, sales figures and certifications
Title	Year	Peak chart positions	Sales	Album
Title	Year	JPN	Sales	Album
Free! Character Song Vol. 1 Haruka Nanase	2013	17	—	Non-album single
Free! Character Song Vol. 2 Makoto Tachibana	2013	16	—	Non-album single
Free! Character Song Vol. 3 Rin Matsuoka	2013	7	—	Non-album single
Free! Character Song Vol. 4 Nagisa Hazuki	2013	10	—	Non-album single
Free! Character Song Vol. 5 Rei Ryugazaki	2013	8	—	Non-album single
Free! Character Song Duet Series 001 Haruka Nanase & Makoto Tachibana	2013	13	—	Non-album single
Free! Character Song Duet Series 002 Nagisa Hazuki & Rei Ryugazaki	2014	10	—	Non-album single
Free! Character Song Duet Series 003 Rin Matsuoka & Rei Ryugazaki	2014	14	—	Non-album single
Free! Character Song Duet Series 004 Haruka Nanase & Rin Matsuoka	2014	5	—	Non-album single
Free! Eternal Summer Character Song Series 01 Haruka Nanase	2014	11	—	Non-album single
Free! Eternal Summer Character Song Series 02 Makoto Tachibana	2014	10	—	Non-album single
Free! Eternal Summer Character Song Series 03 Rin Matsuoka	2014	6	—	Non-album single
Free! Eternal Summer Character Song Series 04 Nagisa Hazuki	2014	10	—	Non-album single
Free! Eternal Summer Character Song Series 05 Rei Ryugazaki	2014	9	—	Non-album single
Free! Eternal Summer Character Song Series 06 Sosuke Yamazaki	2014	12	—	Non-album single
Free! Eternal Summer Character Song Series 07 Aiichiro Nitori	2014	14	—	Non-album single
Free! Eternal Summer Character Song Series 08 Momotaro Mikoshiba	2014	13	—	Non-album single
"—" denotes releases that did not chart or were not released in that region.

== Other charted songs ==
Title	Year	Peak chart positions		Sales	Album
Title	Year	JPN Hot	JPN Ani.	Sales	Album
"Ao no Kanata" (アオノカナタ)	2013	33	10	—	Non-album single
"Mirai e no Stroke" (未来へのストローク)	2013	27	7	—	Non-album single
"Break Our Balance"	2013	18	3	—	Non-album single
"Fun!"	2013	29	4	—	Non-album single
"Dive & Fly"	2013	26	3	—	Non-album single
"Always Here"	2013	22	1	—	Non-album single
"Summer High Tension" (サマーハイテンション☆)	2014	40	3	—	Non-album single
"Vision"	2014	45	5	—	Non-album single
"Real Wave"	2014	33	6	—	Non-album single
"Deep Moment"	2014	23	6	—	Non-album single
"Ryūsen no Yukue" (流線の行方)	2014	20	6	—	Non-album single
"Over the Dream"	2014	14	2	—	Non-album single
"Boku Kakumei" (ボクカクメイ)	2014	19	4	—	Non-album single
"Coming Soooon!"	2014	18	3	—	Non-album single
"Ashita e no Last Race" (明日へのLast Race)	2014	32	7	—	Non-album single
"Akogare Starting Block!" (アコガレStarting Block!)	2014	45	11	—	Non-album single
"Momo Beat"	2014	40	10	—	Non-album single
"—" denotes releases that did not chart or were not released in that region.
