= Toshiyuki Toyonaga =

Japanese voice actor and singer

- 豊永 利行
- Born: April 28, 1984 (age 42); Hachiōji, Tokyo, Japan
- Occupations: Actor; singer; voice actor
- Years active: 1995–present
- Employer: Super Eccentric Theater Inc.
- Height: 162 cm (5 ft 4 in)
- Musical career
- Genre: J-pop
- Instruments: Vocals; guitar; drums
- Years active: 2013–present
- Labels: art sonic; Aniplex; T's MUSIC
- Website: www.toyonaga.info

Toshiyuki Toyonaga (豊永 利行, Toyonaga Toshiyuki; born April 28, 1984) is a Japanese actor and singer. He began working on television and stage as a child actor. He currently works with the Super Eccentric Theater Inc. He played Mikado Ryugamine in Durarara!!, Yuri Katsuki in Yuri on Ice, Shun Matsuoka in Kimi to Boku, Hideyoshi Nagachika in Tokyo Ghoul, Yuuki Tenpouin in Code:Breaker, Mahiro Fuwa in Blast of Tempest, Takeru Totsuka in Kamigami no Asobi, and Goshi Kaneshiro in B-Project.

As a singer, Toyonaga released a series of indie singles and released his first album, Music of the Entertainment, on April 28, 2014. He later debuted on a major label with the single "Reason" on December 16, 2014, as the theme song to the game Durarara!! Relay.

== Biography ==
Toyonaga was born in Hachiōji, Tokyo.

== Filmography ==
=== Television ===
Year	Title	Role	Network	Notes
1997	Ultraman Dyna	Tacchan	—	—
1998	Tensai Terebi-kun: The Ghost Company	Kenji	—	Episode 4
2005	Densha Otoko	Shareo Honekawa	Fuji TV	—
2005	Dayvision1 Stage15 "Odaiba Bouken SP!!"	Atsushi	Fuji TV	—
2006	Tsubasa no Oreta Tenshitachi	—	—	—
2006	Nodame Cantabile	Kobayashi	Fuji TV	—
2007	Happy Boys	Takahashi	Fuji TV	—
2008	Kyo wa Shibuya de Rokuji	Toshiyuki	Fuji TV	—
2008	33pun Tantei	Shindo	Fuji TV	Episode 9
2008	Room of King	Nurse	Fuji TV	—
2019	Secret × Heroine Phantomirage!	Narrator	TV Tokyo	
2020	Police × Heroine Lovepatrina!	Narrator / Warupyoko	TV Tokyo	

=== Anime ===
Year	Title	Role	Notes
2001	The Prince of Tennis	Kentarō Aoi	—
2002	Yokohama Kaidashi Kikou: Quiet Country Cafe	Takahiro	—
2003	Twin Spica	Shinnosuke Fuchuuya	—
2004	Get Ride! Amdriver	Joy Leon	—
2005	Absolute Boy	Ayumu Aizawa	—
2005	Capeta	Kappeita "Capeta" Taira	Middle school
2005	Hell Girl	Sentaro Shibata	—
2005	Eyeshield 21	Ikkyu Hosakawa	—
2006	Ballad of a Shinigami	Kantarō Ichihara	—
2006	Kagihime Monogatari: Eikyuu Alice Rondo	Aruto Kirihara	—
2006	Katekyo Hitman Reborn!	Chikusa Kakimoto, Shōichi Irie	—
2006	Tsuyokiss	Leo Tsushima	—
2007	Kenkō Zenrakei Suieibu Umishō	Kaname Okiura	—
2007	Saishū Shiken Kujira	Mutsumi Kuonji	—
2008	Kanokon	Tayura Minamoto	—
2008–2009	Live on Cardliver Kakeru		-
2008	Chocolate Underground	Huntley Hunter	—
2008	Major S4	Shibuya	—
2009	Fresh Pretty Cure!	Kento Mikoshiba	—
2010	Durarara!!	Mikado Ryūgamine	—
2011	Horizon in the Middle of Nowhere	Toshiie Maeda	—
2011	I Don't Like You at All, Big Brother!	Shūsuke Takanashi	—
2011	Kimi to Boku	Shun Matsuoka	—
2011	Kono Danshi Uchuujin to Tatakaemasu	Arikawa	—
2011	Aikatsu!	Naoto Suzukawa	—
2011	Beyblade Metal Fury	Pluto	—
2012	Mobile Suit Gundam AGE	Flit Asuno	—
2012	Blast of Tempest	Mahiro Fuwa	—
2012	Code:Breaker	Yuuki Tenpouin	—
2012	Kimi to Boku 2	Shun Matsuoka	—
2012	Sword Art Online	Keita	—
2012	Kokoro Connect	Chihiro Uwa	—
2013	My Mental Choices are Completely Interfering with my School Romantic Comedy	Kanade Amakusa	—
2013	Karneval	Kagiri	—
2013	Meganebu!	Koichi Mochizuki	—
2013	Yondemasuyo, Azazel-san	Incubus	—
2014	Kamigami no Asobi	Takeru Totsuka	—
2014	Samurai Flamenco	Hekiru Midorikawa	—
2014	Tokyo Ghoul	Hideyoshi Nagachika	
2014	Captain Earth	Baku	—
2014	Bakumatsu Rock	Heisuke Todo	—
2015	Aldnoah.Zero	Mazuurek	—
2015	Classroom Crisis	Kojiro Kitahara	—
2015	Ace of Diamond	Hiroki Kondo	—
2015	Durarara!! x2	Mikado Ryūgamine	—
2015	Junjo Romantica: Pure Romance	Ryo Shizukuishi	—
2015	Snow White with the Red Hair	Mihaya	—
2015	Tokyo Ghoul √A	Hideyoshi Nagachika	—
2016	And You Thought There Is Never a Girl Online?	Hideki Nishimura/Lucian	—
2016	Bungo Stray Dogs	Jun'ichirō Tanizaki	—
2016	Days	Sho Nakijin	—
2016	Girls Beyond the Wasteland	Atomu Kai	—
2016	Snow White with the Red Hair	Mihaya	—
2016	Haikyu!!	Kenjirō Shirabu	—
2016	Prince of Stride: Alternative	Kaede Okumura	—
2016	Yuri on Ice	Yuri Katsuki	—
2016	B-PROJECT～Kodou＊Ambitious～	Goshi Kaneshiro	—
2016	Digimon Universe: Appli Monsters	Rei Katsura	—
2016	Nanbaka	Tsukumo	—
2017	Marginal #4: Kiss kara Tsukuru Big Bang	Shy Makishima	
2017	Spiritpact	Shito Ritsu	—
2017	Gamers!	Tasuku Uehara	—
2017	TSUKIPRO THE ANIMATION	Sora Ohara	
2017	Altair: A Record of Battles	Johan Frentzen	—
2018	B The Beginning	Brian Brandon	—
2018	Butlers: Chitose Momotose Monogatari	Haruto Hizakura	—
2018	Mahou Shoujo Ore	Mohiro Mikage	—
2018–2021	Kiratto Pri Chan	Yuzuru Aoba	—
2018	Free! Dive to the Future	Asahi Shiina	—
2018	Run with the Wind	Haiji Kiyose	—
2019	Stars Align	Tsubasa Soga	—
2019	B-PROJECT～Zeccho＊Emotion～	Goshi Kaneshiro	—
2020	A3! Season Autumn & Winter	Homare Arisugawa	—
2020	Get Up! Get Live!	Sena Machida	
2020	Dragon Quest: The Adventure of Dai	Popp	
2021	World Trigger 2nd Season	Ratarikov	
2021	Bungo Stray Dogs Wan!	Jun'ichirō Tanizaki	—
2021	I-Chu: Halfway Through the Idol	Akira Mitsurugi	
2021	B: The Beginning Succession	Brian Brandon	—
2021	Koikimo	Ryo Amakusa	
2021	I'm Standing on a Million Lives Season 2	Keita Torii	
2021	Tsukipro The Animation 2	Sora Ohara	—
2021	Sakugan	Yuri	
2022	Fanfare of Adolescence	Hayato Hosho	
2022	Shine On! Bakumatsu Bad Boys!	Heisuke Todo	
2022	Love All Play	Shōgo Misaki	
2022	I'm the Villainess, So I'm Taming the Final Boss	Walt Lizanis	
2023	Buddy Daddies	Kazuki Kurusu	
2023	High Card	Tilt	
2023	Heavenly Delusion	Kona	
2023	Opus Colors	Michitaka Nanba	
2023	Paradox Live the Animation	Nayuta Yatonokami	
2024	My Wife Has No Emotion	Takuma	
2024	The Ossan Newbie Adventurer	Mizett Eldwarf	
2024	Mecha-Ude	Hikaru	
2024	Wind Breaker	Mitsuki Kiryu	
2024	Bye Bye, Earth	Bennett	
2025	Witchy Pretty Cure!! Mirai Days	Ire	
2025	The Apothecary Diaries 2nd Season	Lahan	
2026	Digimon Beatbreak	Raito Souda	
2026	Mao	Kamon	
2026	Jujutsu Kaisen	Jin Itadori	
2026	The Apothecary Diaries 3rd Season (part 1)	Lahan	
2027	The Eternal Fool's Words of Wisdom	Asley	
2027	Inherit the Winds	Kawai Kisaburō	
TBA	The Boxer	J	

=== Original video animation ===
Year	Title	Role	Notes
2002	Yokohama Kaidashi Kikou	Takahiro	—

=== Films ===
Year	Title	Role	Notes
1997	Soul Train	Convenience store clerk	Direct-to-DVD film
1997	School Ghost Stories 3	Satoru Kimura	—
2002	Yume, Oikakete	Keiji	—
2003	1980	Mozume	—
2003	Battle Royale II: Requiem	Shouta Hikasa	—
2004	Kono Yo no Soto e Shinchuu Gun	—	—
2005	Zettai KyoufuPlay	Shima	—
2005	Linda Linda Linda	Ikezawa	—
2006	The Cottage	Kai Tomonori	—
2015	High Speed! Free! Starting Days	Asahi Shiina	Voice
2016	A Silent Voice	Satoshi Mashiba	Voice
2017	Free! Timeless Medley	Asahi Shiina	Voice
2017	Free! Take Your Marks	Asahi Shiina	Voice
2017	Fireworks	Kazuhiro	Voice
2018	Bungo Stray Dogs: Dead Apple	Jun'ichirō Tanizaki	Voice
2019	Free!-Road to the World- the Dream	Asahi Shiina	Voice
2021	Pretty Guardian Sailor Moon Eternal The Movie	Hawk's Eye	Voice
2021	Free! The Final Stroke Part 1	Asahi Shiina	Voice
2022	Free! The Final Stroke Part 2	Asahi Shiina	Voice
2025	The Rose of Versailles	André Grandier	Voice

=== Video games ===
Year	Title	Role	Notes
2003–2007	The Prince of Tennis series	Kentarō Aoki	—
2012	Soulcalibur V	Xiba	—
2012	Custom Drive	Riito Touma	—
2013	Kamigami no Asobi	Takeru Totsuka/Susanoo	—
2013	Caladrius	Kei Percival	—
2015	I-Chu	Akira Mitsurugi	—
2015	Yumeiro Cast	Sosei Tachibana	—
2016	Girls Beyond the Wasteland	Atomu Kai	—
2016	Do-S ni Koishite: Sweet Room de Himitsu no Shihai	Minami Kira	—
2017	A3!	Homare Arisugawa	—
2017	Rage of Bahamut	Yuri Katsuki	—
2017	Granblue Fantasy	Arthur	—
2018	On Air!	Hotaru Kisaki	—
2018	Ikemen Vampire	Wolfgang Amadeus Mozart	—
2018	Dream!ing	Touji Harimiya	—
2018	Identity V	Wu Chang	—
2018	The Thousand Musketeers	Belga	—
2019	Fire Emblem: Three Houses	Claude von Riegan	—
2019	Hero's Park	Aoba Seiji	—
2020	HELIOS Rising Heroes	Akira Otori	—
2020	DAIROKU:AYAKASHIMORI	Tokitsugu Semi	—
2021	Re:Zero − Starting Life in Another World: The Prophecy of the Throne	Tiga Rauleon	PS4, Nintendo Switch, PC
2021	Rune Factory 5	Ares	Nintendo Switch
2021	Fate/Grand Order	Oberon	—
2024	Arknights	Zuo Le	—
2024	Honkai: Star Rail	Jiaoqiu	—
2024	Cookie Run Kingdom	Wind Archer Cookie	
2025	Fatal Fury: City of the Wolves	Vox Reaper	—

=== Dubbing ===
==== Live-action ====
- Bleeding Steel – Li Sen (Show Lo)
- Spider-Man: Far From Home – Brad Davis (Remy Hii)

==== Animation ====
- Link Click – Cheng Xiaoshi/Toki
- Kiff – Barry Buns

=== Drama CD ===
- Dear Vocalist – MOMOCHI
- THANATOS NiGHT – Duran
- THANATOS NiGHT Re:Vival – Duran
- Paradox Live – Nayuta Yatonokami
- Fabulous Night | ファビュラスナイト – Reimu Sumeragi

=== Other ===
- Kokuhaku Jikkō Iinkai: Ren'ai Series – Minami

== Stage ==
- TenniMu – Kachiro Kato
- Aoharu Tetsudou – Saikyo Line

== Discography ==
=== Indie Single ===
	Release date	Title	Lyrics, Composition, Arrangement	Remarks
1	September 29, 2013	Encounter	Music and Lyric by: Toshiyuki Toyonaga / Arrangement: Kazuya Nishioka	Sold in the 1st live
2	October 20, 2013	Tokoshie	Music and Lyric by: Toshiyuki Toyonaga / Arrangement: Kazuya Nishioka	Sold in the 2nd live
3	November 16, 2013	Tsuki wa shitteiru	Music and Lyric by: Toshiyuki Toyonaga / Arrangement: Kazuya Nishioka	Sold in the 3rd live
4	December 7, 2013	siren	Music and Lyric by: Toshiyuki Toyonaga / Arrangement: Kazuya Nishioka	Sold in the 4th live
5	December 29–31, 2013	Kotatsu sherbet	Music and Lyric by: Toshiyuki Toyonaga / Arrangement: Kazuya Nishioka	Sold at Comic Market 85
6	January 12 & 13, 2014	Hello!	Lyrics: Toshiyuki Toyonaga / composition, arrangement: Kazuya Nishioka	Sold in the 4.5th and 5th live
7	February 15, 2014	TV game	Music and Lyric by: Toshiyuki Toyonaga / Arrangement: Kazuya Nishioka	Sold in the 6th live
8	March 22, 2014	chase	Music and Lyric by: Toshiyuki Toyonaga / Arrangement: Kazuya Nishioka	Sold in the 7th live

=== Major ===
	Release date	Title	Lyrics, Composition, Arrangement	Catalog No.
1	December 17, 2014	Reason...	Music and Lyric by: T.Toyonaga/ Arrangement: Iehara Masaki	SVWC-70030

=== Album ===
	Release date	Album	Catalog No.
1	April 30, 2014	MUSIC OF THE ENTERTAINMENT	ASCD-1003
1	March 7, 2018	With LIFE	DAKTSM-1001
