= Free! Take Your Marks =

- Theatrical release poster
- Directed by: Eisaku Kawanami
- Written by: Masahiro Yokotani
- Starring: Nobunaga Shimazaki; Tatsuhisa Suzuki; Tsubasa Yonaga; Daisuke Hirakawa; Mamoru Miyano; Yoshimasa Hosoya; Koki Miyata; Kenichi Suzumura; Toshiyuki Toyonaga; Kouki Uchiyama; Kenji Nojima; Satoshi Hino; Chihiro Suzuki; Akeno Watanabe; Satsuki Yukino
- Cinematography: Kazuya Takao
- Music by: Tatsuya Kato
- Production companies: Kyoto Animation; Animation Do
- Distributed by: Shochiku
- Release date: October 28, 2017
- Running time: 105 minutes
- Country: Japan
- Language: Japanese
- Box office: ¥346 million

Free! Take Your Marks (特別版 Free!-Take Your Marks-, Tokubetsuban Free! Take Your Marks) is a 2017 Japanese animated film produced by Kyoto Animation and Animation Do based on the animated television series Free!, which aired from 2013 to 2014. It is a sequel of Free! Eternal Summer and is the final part of Free! Timeless Medley's film trilogy project, consisting of an all-new original story that serves as a direct continuation to the compilation films. It is told in four episodic parts.

== Plot ==
Choice of Fate! (運命のチョイス！, Unmei no Choisu!): Haruka Nanase, joined by Makoto Tachibana, looks for an apartment in Tokyo as he prepares to enter college. Kisumi Shigino, whose uncle owns a rental agency, helps him lease an apartment close to a pool. While visiting the apartment, Haruka and Makoto find a boy named Misaki, a young swimmer who was coached by the previous tenant, Nao Serizawa.

Cooling Down at a Secluded Hot Spring! (秘湯のクーリングダウン！, Hitō no Kūringu Daun!): While Aiichiro Nitori decides on a graduation present for Rin Matsuoka and Sosuke Yamazaki, Momotaro Mikoshiba wins tickets to the Anago Hot Springs, which they present to the two through an elaborate scavenger hunt. During the trip, Momotaro gets into a heated competition with the captain of Sofukan High School's swim team over a capybara plush toy. Natsuya Kirishima, an alumnus of Sofukan High School and chaperone to their training camp, offers wise words to Sosuke over his shoulder injury. On their way back Aiichiro and Momotaro give Rin and Sosuke two good luck charms as gifts.

Butterfly of Promise! (結束のバタフライ！, Kessoku no Batafurai!): Rei Ryugazaki, Nagisa Hazuki, and Gou Matsuoka create a recruitment video for the swimming team for the upcoming school year. While filming, Gou finds an old recruitment manual left from the previous members of the club with the strategy "PKH East", which they believe to be resourceful for the video. They investigate to find out that it was the nickname for "Perfect Kinniku (Muscles) Handsome Azuma", a member of the swim team who had attracted many female members onto the team with his appearance. Though disappointed, the event inspires Rei to complete the video. Asahi Shiina makes a cameo in this segment during their investigation.

Eternal Blue of Setting Off! (旅立ちのエターナルブルー！, Tabidachi no Etānaru Burū!): While the Iwatobi High School and Samezuka Academy swim teams plan a surprise going-away party for Rin, who is leaving for Australia soon, Rin sees Gou and Momotaro together and assumes they are dating. He discovers that Momotaro plans to challenge him to a relay along with his older brother, Seijuro Mikoshiba, making him even more concerned about losing Gou. When Rin enlists Haruka for help, he reveals that Momotaro had wanted a toy Rin had gotten at a burger restaurant. Nevertheless, the two race against the Mikoshiba brothers. After winning the relay, the swim clubs celebrate Rin's departure. Meanwhile, Ikuya Kirishima and Hiyori Tono prepare for the upcoming time trials at their college.

In a post-credits scene, a message reads, "See you next stage", which was later revealed as a teaser for Free!'s third season, Dive to the Future.

== Production ==
Kyoto Animation announced that a "new screen project" had been green-lit in a promotional video for the home release of High Speed! Free! Starting Days. Details were announced at an event on March 19, 2017, where it was announced that the project would consist of two compilation films of Free! Eternal Summer, the series' second season, titled Free! Timeless Medley. In addition to the two films, the project also included a third all-new original film sequel to the series and takes place where Haruka prepares to enter college, which serves as a transition to the series' third season, Free! Dive to the Future. The film is told in four episodic parts and was released in theaters on October 28, 2017. Free! Take Your Marks was released on DVD and Blu-ray on April 4, 2018.

Funimation acquired the rights for Free! Take Your Marks, along with High Speed! Free! Starting Days and Free! Timeless Medley for distribution in North America. A limited screening of Free! Take Your Marks was held on March 14, 2018, with English subtitles. All films were released as a set in October 2018.

== Reception ==
Free! Take Your Marks opened at #8 on its opening week. The film made ¥346 million at box office. The limited edition of the Blu-ray release debuted at #1 on Oricon and sold 6,336 copies on its first week, while the regular edition debuted at #7 and sold 1,991 on its first week. The DVD release debuted at #2 and sold 3,592 copies on its first week.

Spencer Dakos from Anime News Network praised the film's comedic approach in revealing sides to the characters that were never seen before and noted that the film took a step away from the dramatic storytelling in High Speed! Free! Starting Days and Free! Eternal Summer. Jacob Chapman from Anime News Network cited the film's strengths as an "enjoyable comedy" that helps "ease fans gently into season three", but claimed that the film seemed like an original video animation and the change in director from Hiroko Utsumi to Eisaku Kawanami greatly affected the "atmosphere, drama, and fan service." Nick Creamer from Anime News Network praised it for integrating the comedic style of the show's first season, but felt that the narrative was not cohesive.

== Soundtrack ==
Free! Take Your Marks Original Soundtrack: Bring it In!
- Cover

Soundtrack album by Various artists
- Released: November 29, 2017
- Label: Lantis
- Producer: Tatsuya Kato

Various artists chronology
Free! Timeless Medley Original Soundtrack: Bond and Promise (2017)	Free! Take Your Marks Original Soundtrack: Bring it In! (2017)

The original soundtrack was produced by Tatsuya Kato, and it was released on November 29, 2017, under the name Free! Take Your Marks Original Soundtrack: Bring it In! (『特別版 Free!-Take Your Marks-』オリジナルサウンドトラック「Bring it in!」). The album peaked at #42 on the Oricon Weekly Albums Chart and charted for two weeks.

The opening theme song, "Free-style Spirit", was performed by Style Five, which consists of the voice actors for Haruka, Makoto, Nagisa, Rei, and Rin. The ending theme song, "What Wonderful Days!!", was performed by The Merry Friends of Iwatobi (岩鳶町のゆかいな仲間たち, Iwatobi-cho no Yukai na Nakama-tachi). Both songs were released as a double-A side single on November 8, 2017, which debuted on Oricon at #19 and charted for 5 weeks. They were later added on the original soundtrack album, along with all three versions of "What Wonderful Days!!"

All tracks are written by Tatsuya Kato.

Disc 1
No.	Title	Lyrics	Music	Arrangement	Length
1.	"Dream of New Life"	—	Tatsuya Kato	Tatsuya Kato
2.	"Each of the Day"	—	Tatsuya Kato	Tatsuya Kato
3.	"Brand New Town"	—	Tatsuya Kato	Tatsuya Kato
4.	"To Next Town"	—	Tatsuya Kato	Tatsuya Kato
5.	"Peace of Mind"	—	Tatsuya Kato	Tatsuya Kato
6.	"Seeds of Hope"	—	Tatsuya Kato	Tatsuya Kato
7.	"Watching His Back"	—	Tatsuya Kato	Tatsuya Kato
8.	"Thanks t You"	—	Tatsuya Kato	Tatsuya Kato
9.	"Advance One Step"	—	Tatsuya Kato	Tatsuya Kato
10.	"Precious Place"	—	Tatsuya Kato	Tatsuya Kato
11.	"Trying the Luck"	—	Tatsuya Kato	Tatsuya Kato
12.	"Treasure-hunting!" (part 1)	—	Tatsuya Kato	Tatsuya Kato
13.	"Treasure-hunting!" (part 2)	—	Tatsuya Kato	Tatsuya Kato
14.	"A Pleasant Journey"	—	Tatsuya Kato	Tatsuya Kato
15.	"Powerhouse Team"	—	Tatsuya Kato	Tatsuya Kato
16.	"My Possibility"	—	Tatsuya Kato	Tatsuya Kato
17.	"Thought to Best Friend"	—	Tatsuya Kato	Tatsuya Kato
18.	"True Feeling"	—	Tatsuya Kato	Tatsuya Kato
19.	"With All Our Heart"	—	Tatsuya Kato	Tatsuya Kato

Disc 2
No.	Title	Lyrics	Music	Arrangement	Length
1.	"Difficult Journey"	—	Tatsuya Kato	Tatsuya Kato
2.	"Let's Go For a Drive!"	—	Tatsuya Kato	Tatsuya Kato
3.	"Funny Preparation"	—	Tatsuya Kato	Tatsuya Kato
4.	"Funny Shooting"	—	Tatsuya Kato	Tatsuya Kato
5.	"Don't Give Up!"	—	Tatsuya Kato	Tatsuya Kato
6.	"A New Finding"	—	Tatsuya Kato	Tatsuya Kato
7.	"The History Continues"	—	Tatsuya Kato	Tatsuya Kato
8.	"Free and Beautiful"	—	Tatsuya Kato	Tatsuya Kato
9.	"Precious Bonds"	—	Tatsuya Kato	Tatsuya Kato
10.	"Each of Decision"	—	Tatsuya Kato	Tatsuya Kato
11.	"Surprise Plan"	—	Tatsuya Kato	Tatsuya Kato
12.	"Strange Meeting"	—	Tatsuya Kato	Tatsuya Kato
13.	"Feeling Restless"	—	Tatsuya Kato	Tatsuya Kato
14.	"His Passion"	—	Tatsuya Kato	Tatsuya Kato
15.	"Noisy Temmate"	—	Tatsuya Kato	Tatsuya Kato
16.	"Heat Up the Battle" (part 1)	—	Tatsuya Kato	Tatsuya Kato
17.	"Heat Up the Battle" (part 2)	—	Tatsuya Kato	Tatsuya Kato
18.	"You Changed My Life"	—	Tatsuya Kato	Tatsuya Kato
19.	"Get Set, Go!"	—	Tatsuya Kato	Tatsuya Kato
20.	"Departure of Eternal Blue"	—	Tatsuya Kato	Tatsuya Kato
21.	"Beginning of Next Stage"	—	Tatsuya Kato	Tatsuya Kato
22.	"Eye catch #01"	—	Tatsuya Kato	Tatsuya Kato
23.	"Eye catch #02"	—	Tatsuya Kato	Tatsuya Kato
24.	"Eye catch #03"	—	Tatsuya Kato	Tatsuya Kato
25.	"Eye catch #04"	—	Tatsuya Kato	Tatsuya Kato
26.	"What Wonderful Days!! #01" (performed by Iwatobi-cho no Yukai na Nakama-tachi (Nobunaga Shimazaki as Haruka Nanase, Tatsuhisa Suzuki as Makoto Tachibana, Tsubasa Yonaga as Nagisa Hazuki, and Daisuke Hirakawa as Rei Ryugazaki))	Saori Kodama	Yusuke Itagaki	Yusuke Itagaki
27.	"What Wonderful Days!! #02" (performed by Iwatobi-cho no Yukai na Nakama-tachi (Nobunaga Shimazaki as Haruka Nanase, Tatsuhisa Suzuki as Makoto Tachibana, Tsubasa Yonaga as Nagisa Hazuki, and Daisuke Hirakawa as Rei Ryugazaki, Mamoru Miyano as Rin Matsuoka, Yoshimasa Hosoya as Sosuke Yamazaki, Koki Miyata as Aiichiro Nitori, and Kenichi Suzumura as Momotaro Mikoshiba))	Saori Kodama	Yusuke Itagaki	Yusuke Itagaki
28.	"What Wonderful Days!! #03" (performed by Iwatobi-cho no Yukai na Nakama-tachi (Nobunaga Shimazaki as Haruka Nanase, Tatsuhisa Suzuki as Makoto Tachibana, Tsubasa Yonaga as Nagisa Hazuki, and Daisuke Hirakawa as Rei Ryugazaki, Mamoru Miyano as Rin Matsuoka, Yoshimasa Hosoya as Sosuke Yamazaki, Koki Miyata as Aiichiro Nitori, Kenichi Suzumura as Momotaro Mikoshiba, Kenjiro Tsuda as Seijuro Mikoshiba, Akeno Watanabe as Gou Matsuoka, Satsuki Yukino as Miho Amakata, and Hiroshi Yanaka as Goro Sasabe))	Saori Kodama	Yusuke Itagaki	Yusuke Itagaki
