= Tatsuya Kato =

Japanese anime composer and arranger (born 1980)

Tatsuya Kato 加藤 達也
- Born: July 28, 1980 (age 46); Funabashi, Chiba, Japan
- Genres: Orchestral; electronic; acoustic; rock; pop; soundtrack
- Occupations: Composer; arranger
- Instrument: Piano
- Years active: 2003–present
- Label: APDREAM

Tatsuya Kato (加藤 達也, Katō Tatsuya; born July 28, 1980) is a Japanese anime composer and arranger. He is known for his works on many anime series, including Future Diary, Food Wars: Shokugeki no Soma, Fate/kaleid liner Prisma Illya, Love Live! Sunshine!! and Free!. He is currently represented by the music production company APDREAM.

== Biography ==
Kato was born in Funabashi, Chiba. He graduated from the film scoring program at the Tokyo College of Music and majored in composition and conducting. While there, he studied composition and arrangement under Shigeaki Saegusa, Katsuhisa Hattori, Reijiro Koroku, and Kentaro Haneda.

== Works ==
=== Anime ===
- Spider Riders (2006) – with Fumitaka Anzai, Nobuhiko Nakayama, and Tomomasa Yoneda
- Kämpfer (2009)
- Miracle Train: Welcome to the Oedo Line (2009)
- Needless (2009)
- Phantom: Requiem for the Phantom (2009) – with Hikaru Nanase
- The Qwaser of Stigmata (2010)
- Demon King Daimao (2010)
- Goulart Knights (2010)
- Hyakka Ryōran Samurai Girls (2010)
- +Tic Elder Sister (2011)
- Horizon in the Middle of Nowhere (2011)
- Kämpfer: Für die Liebe (2011)
- T.P. Sakura: Time Paladin Sakura (2011)
- Future Diary (2011)
- Medaka Box (2012)
- Campione! (2012)
- Horizon in the Middle of Nowhere II (2012)
- Medaka Box Abnormal (2012)
- Hyakka Ryōran Samurai Bride (2013)
- Fate/kaleid liner Prisma Illya (2013)
- Free! - Iwatobi Swim Club (2013)
- Day Break Illusion (2013)
- Gingitsune (2013)
- Buddy Complex (2014)
- World Conquest Zvezda Plot (2014)
- Fate/kaleid liner Prisma Illya 2wei! (2014)
- Free! - Eternal Summer (2014)
- Celestial Method (2014)
- Yatterman Night (2015)
- Food Wars: Shokugeki no Soma (2015)
- The Disappearance of Nagato Yuki-chan (2015)
- Fate/kaleid liner Prisma Illya 2wei Herz! (2015)
- Comet Lucifer (2015)
- Luck & Logic (2016)
- Food Wars! Shokugeki no Soma: The Second Plate (2016)
- Love Live! Sunshine!! (2016)
- Matoi the Sacred Slayer (2016)
- Masamune-kun's Revenge (2017)
- WorldEnd (2017)
- Saiyuki Reload Blast (2017)
- Food Wars! Shokugeki no Soma: The Third Plate (2017)
- IDOLiSH7 (2018)
- Kiratto Pri Chan (2018)
- The Badminton Play of Ayano Hanesaki! (2018)
- Free! - Dive to the Future (2018)
- Revue Starlight (2018) – with Yoshiaki Fujisawa
- Fate/kaleid liner Prisma Illya: Prisma Phantasm (2019)
- Dr. Stone (2019) – with Hiroaki Tsutsumi and Yuki Kanesaka
- Ensemble Stars! (2019)
- Food Wars! Shokugeki no Soma: The Fourth Plate (2019)
- IDOLiSH7: Second Beat! (2020)
- Food Wars! Shokugeki no Soma: The Fifth Plate (2020)
- Dr. Stone: Stone Wars (2021) – with Hiroaki Tsutsumi and Yuki Kanesaka
- IDOLiSH7: Third Beat! (2021)
- Sakugan (2021)
- Parallel World Pharmacy (2022) – with Satoshi Hono
- Trigun Stampede (2023)
- Yohane the Parhelion: Sunshine in the Mirror (2023)
- Masamune-kun's Revenge R (2023)
- Demon Lord 2099 (2024)
- Your Forma (2025)
- Snowball Earth (2026) – with Hiroaki Tsutsumi and Yuki Kanesaka
- Fool Night (2026)

=== Films ===
- High Speed! Free! Starting Days (2015)
- Free! Timeless Medley (2017)
- Fate/kaleid liner Prisma Illya: Oath Under Snow (2017) – with Technoboys Pulcraft Green-Fund
- Free! Take Your Marks (2017)
- Love Live! Sunshine!! The School Idol Movie: Over The Rainbow (2019)
- Free! Road to the World - the Dream (2019)
- Revue Starlight: Rondo Rondo Rondo (2020) – with Yoshiaki Fujisawa
- Free! The Final Stroke - Part 1 (2021)
- Free! The Final Stroke - Part 2 (2022)
- Komada: A Whisky Family (2023)

=== Other involvements ===
Year	Title	Artist	Role(s)	Album	Ref(s)
2006			Programming	Zeta Gundam: A New Translation	
2006	"Haitoku no Gajou"	Miyu Irino	Composition & arrangement	Inspired Zwei	
2014		GRANRODEO	Programming	Karma to Labyrinth	
2014	"Hoshi no Kakera"	fhána	Arrangement	Sonata and Interlude	
2015	"Philosophy of Dear World"	ZAQ	Strings arrangement	Philosophy of Dear World	
2015	"ailes"	TRUE	Composition & arrangement	Joy Heart	
2016		Aki Hata	Arrangement	Koware Sekai Oware	
2018			Composition & arrangement	Aqours ORIGINAL SONG CD 7	
2018	"Sajou no Roukaku"		Arrangement	ENSEMBLE STARS! ALBUM SERIES PRESENT -Valkyrie-	
2019	"Gyakkyō no Orion"		Composition & arrangement	Revue Starlight Revue Album: La Revue Éternel	
2020	"Campanula"	Reina Ueda	Composition & arrangement	Empathy	
2021		Aqours	Composition & arrangement	smile smile ship Start!	
