= Free! Timeless Medley =

2017 Japanese film

- Theatrical release poster for Free! Timeless Medley: The Bond
- Directed by: Eisaku Kawanami
- Written by: Masahiro Yokotani
- Starring: Nobunaga Shimazaki; Tatsuhisa Suzuki; Tsubasa Yonaga; Daisuke Hirakawa; Mamoru Miyano; Yoshimasa Hosoya; Koki Miyata; Kenichi Suzumura; Toshiyuki Toyonaga; Kouki Uchiyama; Kenji Nojima; Satoshi Hino; Chihiro Suzuki; Akeno Watanabe; Satsuki Yukino
- Cinematography: Kazuya Takao
- Music by: Tatsuya Kato
- Production companies: Kyoto Animation; Animation Do
- Distributed by: Shochiku
- Release dates: April 22, 2017 (The Bond); July 1, 2017 (The Promise)
- Running time: 94 minutes (The Bond); 99 minutes (The Promise)
- Country: Japan
- Language: Japanese
- Box office: ¥270 million (The Bond); ¥288 million (The Promise)

Free! Timeless Medley (劇場版 Free!-Timeless Medley-, Gekijōban Free! Timeless Medley) is a 2017 Japanese animated film series produced by Kyoto Animation and Animation Do. The first two films, The Bond (絆, Kizuna) and The Promise (約束, Yakusoku), are compilation films of Free!'s second season, Free! Eternal Summer, with new additional footage and redone scenes. A third film, Free! Take Your Marks, was included with the film's trilogy project, containing an all-new original story that serves as a sequel to the compilation films.

== Plot ==
=== The Bond ===
In junior high school, Haruka Nanase joins the swim team, but quits after a falling out with his elementary school rival Rin Matsuoka, home from schooling in Australia, causing Haruka's teammate, Ikuya Kirishima, to resent him. The swim team disbands, as Asahi Shiina moves away and Ikuya studies abroad. In high school, Haruka prepares for tournaments with teammates Makoto Tachibana, Nagisa Hazuki, and Rei Ryugazaki, while Rin, who has since reconciled with them, does the same. Haruka is in his final year of high school, but has not yet made post-graduation plans, even after being scouted by a university during prefecturals. Meanwhile, Makoto becomes inspired to become a swim coach after helping Kisumi Shigino's little brother, Hayato, learn how to swim.

During regionals, Haruka is overwhelmed by the pressure of performing in front of university scouts and stops swimming in the middle of his individual event. When confronted about not having a dream by Rin, Haruka becomes uncharacteristically angry, which concerns his friends. Later, Makoto attempts to reason with Haruka, but they end up in a heated argument in which Makoto reveals his decision to attend university in Tokyo to fulfill his own dream. Haruka feels even more lost, but with prompting from Makoto, Rin takes Haruka with him back to Australia. The trip inspires Haruka to swim at the college level and upon returning to Japan, he makes amends with his team. With renewed hope and bonds with his friends, Haruka and his team place 6th overall in nationals.

In a post-credits scene, during nationals, Sosuke Yamazaki gets lost, only to end up watching the individual medleys, where Ikuya from Shionezaki High School overtakes everyone. After the tournament, Ikuya discusses his condition with his older brother, Natsuya Kirishima.

=== The Promise ===
Sosuke Yamazaki, Rin's best friend from childhood, transfers into his class at Samezuka Academy. Rin and Sosuke had promised each other as children to continue their swim careers together but unbeknownst to Rin, Sosuke has incurred a serious shoulder injury from overuse, yet continues to swim as they prepare for upcoming tournaments. While Rin is serious about swimming, Sosuke struggles to find a reason to continue, further straining their friendship.

At the regional tournament, Rin finally learns about Sosuke's injury. Sosuke, now cherishing the bonds he has forged with the swim team, is determined to participate in the team medley one last time. The team places second in the race, thus qualifying for nationals, and Sosuke decides to get medical treatment for his injury. Despite dropping out of the nationals, he offers to help Aiichiro Nitori and Momotaro Mikoshiba prepare.

In a post-credits scene, Sosuke warns Rin about Ikuya, whose freestyle resembles Haruka's in both form and speed. Meanwhile, Ikuya refuses to attend the nationals' awards ceremony to call Natsuya. Gou becomes determined to recruit new members for the next school year. Aiichiro, Momotaro, Nagisa, and Rei reaffirm their rivalry and plan a joint practice together. While Asahi exchanges farewells with his swim team at Kazami High School, he receives a text message from Kisumi. Haruka and Makoto arrive in Tokyo.

== Production ==
Kyoto Animation announced that a "new screen project" had been green-lit in a promotional video for the home release of High Speed! Free! Starting Days. Details were announced at an event on March 19, 2017, where it was announced that the project would consist of two compilation films of Free! Eternal Summer, the series' second season. The trilogy also included a third companion film, Free! Take Your Marks, consisting of a direct sequel and an all-new original story.

The first film, Free! Timeless Medley: The Bond (劇場版 Free! -Timeless Medley- 絆, Gekijōban Free! Timeless Medley: Kizuna), focuses on the members of the Iwatobi Swim Club, and it was released in theaters on April 22, 2017. The second film, Free! Timeless Medley: The Promise (劇場版 Free! -Timeless Medley- 約束, Gekijōban Free! Timeless Medley: Yakusoku), focuses on Rin and Sosuke, and it was released in theaters on July 1, 2017. Both films contained new additional footage and redone scenes. Clear file folders were distributed as limited theater gifts The Bond was released on Blu-ray and DVD on November 1, 2017, while The Promise was released on December 6, 2017. The Bond had a limited theater screening in Singapore and Indonesia on February 22, 2018, by Encore Films with Chinese and English subtitles. Encore Films later screened The Promise on March 15, 2018.

Funimation acquired the rights for Free! Timeless Medley, along with High Speed! Free! Starting Days and Free! Take Your Marks for distribution in North America. All films were released as a set in October 2018.

== Reception ==
The Bond opened at #9 on its opening day and ranked #10 on its opening weekend. The film made ¥270 million at box office. The home release debuted at #1 on both Oricon's DVD and Blu-ray charts, with 7,105 Blu-ray discs and 4,302 DVDs sold on its first week. The Promise opened at #8 on its opening day and ranked at #10 on its opening weekend. The film made ¥288 million at box office. The Blu-ray release debuted at #1 on Oricon and sold 7,105 copies on its first week. The DVD release debuted at #2 on Oricon and sold 4,069 copies on its first week.

== Soundtrack ==
Free! Timeless Medley Original Soundtrack: Bond and Promise
- Cover

Soundtrack album by Various artists
- Released: July 31, 2017
- Label: Lantis
- Producer: Tatsuya Kato

Various artists chronology
| High Speed! Free! Starting Days Original Soundtrack: Pure Blue Scenes (2016) | Free! Timeless Medley Original Soundtrack: Bond and Promise (2017) | Free! Take Your Marks Original Soundtrack: Bring it In! (2017) |

The original soundtrack was produced by Tatsuya Kato, and it was released on July 31, 2017, under the name Free! Timeless Medley Original Soundtrack: Bond and Promise (『劇場版 Free! -Timeless Medley-』オリジナルサウンドトラック「Bond and Promise」). The film's theme song, "Rising Free", is performed by Style Five, a group consisting of the voice actors for Haruka, Makoto, Nagisa, Rei, and Rin. "Rising Free" was released along with the soundtrack, which debuted at #17 on Oricon and charted for three weeks.

All tracks are written by Tatsuya Kato.

Disc 1
| No. | Title | Lyrics | Music | Arrangement | Length |
|---|---|---|---|---|---|
| 1. | "The Beginning of "Timeless Medley"" | — | Tatsuya Kato | Tatsuya Kato |
| 2. | "Rhythm of Pure Memories" | — | Tatsuya Kato | Tatsuya Kato |
| 3. | "Welcome Party" | — | Tatsuya Kato | Tatsuya Kato |
| 4. | "Tender Eyes" | — | Tatsuya Kato | Tatsuya Kato |
| 5. | "Sense of Rivalry" | — | Tatsuya Kato | Tatsuya Kato |
| 6. | "Keen Competition" | — | Tatsuya Kato | Tatsuya Kato |
| 7. | "Fine Game" | — | Tatsuya Kato | Tatsuya Kato |
| 8. | "I Think of You" | — | Tatsuya Kato | Tatsuya Kato |
| 9. | "Heated Race" | — | Tatsuya Kato | Tatsuya Kato |
| 10. | "Hard Fight" | — | Tatsuya Kato | Tatsuya Kato |
| 11. | "More Efforts" | — | Tatsuya Kato | Tatsuya Kato |
| 12. | "Meaning of "Free"" | — | Tatsuya Kato | Tatsuya Kato |
| 13. | "Turning Point" | — | Tatsuya Kato | Tatsuya Kato |
| 14. | "Pure Emotion" | — | Tatsuya Kato | Tatsuya Kato |
| 15. | "One Step Forward" | — | Tatsuya Kato | Tatsuya Kato |
| 16. | "Positive Approach" | — | Tatsuya Kato | Tatsuya Kato |
| 17. | "Swim Together" | — | Tatsuya Kato | Tatsuya Kato |
| 18. | "His Frustration" | — | Tatsuya Kato | Tatsuya Kato |
| 19. | "Anguish of Heart" | — | Tatsuya Kato | Tatsuya Kato |
| 20. | "Fall into Deep Place" | — | Tatsuya Kato | Tatsuya Kato |
| 21. | "Precious Fellowship" | — | Tatsuya Kato | Tatsuya Kato |
| 22. | "Distance Between Our Hearts" | — | Tatsuya Kato | Tatsuya Kato |
| 23. | "Mind of Fellow" | — | Tatsuya Kato | Tatsuya Kato |
| 24. | "Only for Your Future" | — | Tatsuya Kato | Tatsuya Kato |
| 25. | "Beyond the Sea" | — | Tatsuya Kato | Tatsuya Kato |
| 26. | "Longing for You" | — | Tatsuya Kato | Tatsuya Kato |
| 27. | "Our Friendship" | — | Tatsuya Kato | Tatsuya Kato |
| 28. | "Place of Memories" | — | Tatsuya Kato | Tatsuya Kato |
| 29. | "Wish for You" | — | Tatsuya Kato | Tatsuya Kato |
| 30. | "Way to the Future" | — | Tatsuya Kato | Tatsuya Kato |
| 31. | "His Determination" | — | Tatsuya Kato | Tatsuya Kato |
| 32. | "Step to Tomorrow" | — | Tatsuya Kato | Tatsuya Kato |
| 33. | "The Timeless Medley (The Bond)" | — | Tatsuya Kato | Tatsuya Kato |
| 34. | "Premonition (The Bond)" | — | Tatsuya Kato | Tatsuya Kato |
| 35. | "Trailer of Timeless Medley (The Promise)" | — | Tatsuya Kato | Tatsuya Kato |

Disc 2
| No. | Title | Lyrics | Music | Arrangement | Length |
|---|---|---|---|---|---|
| 1. | "Precious Days" | — | Tatsuya Kato | Tatsuya Kato |
| 2. | "Recollection of Sadness" | — | Tatsuya Kato | Tatsuya Kato |
| 3. | "Our Boyhood" | — | Tatsuya Kato | Tatsuya Kato |
| 4. | "Days That Changed My Life" | — | Tatsuya Kato | Tatsuya Kato |
| 5. | "Brand New Days" | — | Tatsuya Kato | Tatsuya Kato |
| 6. | "Memory of Cherry Blossoms" | — | Tatsuya Kato | Tatsuya Kato |
| 7. | "Meeting Again" | — | Tatsuya Kato | Tatsuya Kato |
| 8. | "One Summer Day" | — | Tatsuya Kato | Tatsuya Kato |
| 9. | "For the Sprashu Fes!" | — | Tatsuya Kato | Tatsuya Kato |
| 10. | "Theme of Sea Otter Part 2" | — | Tatsuya Kato | Tatsuya Kato |
| 11. | "Exciting Game" | — | Tatsuya Kato | Tatsuya Kato |
| 12. | "Little Promise" | — | Tatsuya Kato | Tatsuya Kato |
| 13. | "Give Me Your Word" | — | Tatsuya Kato | Tatsuya Kato |
| 14. | "New Resolution" | — | Tatsuya Kato | Tatsuya Kato |
| 15. | "Family Ties" | — | Tatsuya Kato | Tatsuya Kato |
| 16. | "Past Memories" | — | Tatsuya Kato | Tatsuya Kato |
| 17. | "Our Relationship" | — | Tatsuya Kato | Tatsuya Kato |
| 18. | "Challenge to Fight" | — | Tatsuya Kato | Tatsuya Kato |
| 19. | "Burst of Emotion" | — | Tatsuya Kato | Tatsuya Kato |
| 20. | "Give it My All" | — | Tatsuya Kato | Tatsuya Kato |
| 21. | "Best Teammate" | — | Tatsuya Kato | Tatsuya Kato |
| 22. | "Energetic Swim" | — | Tatsuya Kato | Tatsuya Kato |
| 23. | "The Starting Point" | — | Tatsuya Kato | Tatsuya Kato |
| 24. | "His Truth" | — | Tatsuya Kato | Tatsuya Kato |
| 25. | "Fulfill the Promise" | — | Tatsuya Kato | Tatsuya Kato |
| 26. | "Timeless Medley (The Promise)" | — | Tatsuya Kato | Tatsuya Kato |
| 27. | "Real Motive" | — | Tatsuya Kato | Tatsuya Kato |
| 28. | "Toward the Hope" | — | Tatsuya Kato | Tatsuya Kato |
| 29. | "Each of the New Departure" | — | Tatsuya Kato | Tatsuya Kato |
| 30. | "The Premonition (The Promise)" | — | Tatsuya Kato | Tatsuya Kato |
| 31. | "See You Next Stage" | — | Tatsuya Kato | Tatsuya Kato |
| 32. | "Trailer of "Take Your Marks"" | — | Tatsuya Kato | Tatsuya Kato |
| 33. | "Rising Free" (performed by Style Five (Nobunaga Shimazaki as Haruka Nanase, Tatsuhisa Suzuki as Makoto Tachibana, Mamoru Miyano as Rin Matsuoka, Tsubasa Yonaga as Nagisa Hazuki, and Daisuke Hirakawa as Rei Ryugazaki)) | Saori Kodama | Takuya Watanabe | Takuya Watanabe |
