= Nobunaga Shimazaki =

Japanese voice actor (born 1988)

- 島崎 信長
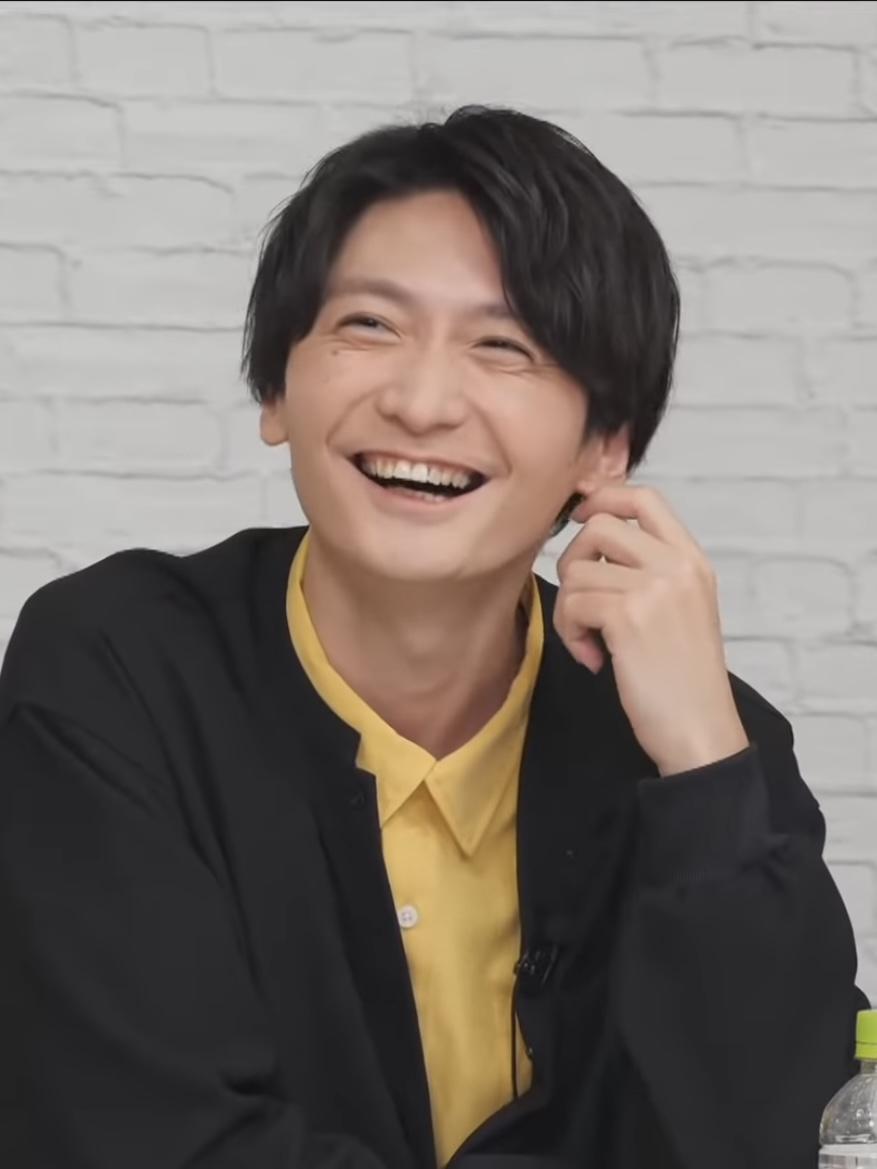
- Shimazaki in 2022
- Born: December 6, 1988 (age 37); Shiogama, Miyagi Prefecture, Japan
- Occupation: Voice actor
- Years active: 2009–present
- Agent: Aoni Production
- Notable work: Free! as Haruka Nanase; Date A Live as Shidō Itsuka; Black Clover as Yuno; The Disastrous Life of Saiki K as Shun Kaido; World Trigger as Hyuse; Haikyuu!!: To The Top as Rintarō Suna; Parasyte as Shinichi Izumi; Fruits Basket as Yuki Sohma; Astra Lost in Space as Charce Lecroix; Baki the Grappler as Baki Hanma; Sword Art Online as Eugeo; Jujutsu Kaisen as Mahito; Tokyo Revengers as Izana Kurokawa; Blue Lock as Nagi Seishirou; Wind Breaker as Suo Hayato; Sakamoto Days as Shin Asakura
- Children: 1

Nobunaga Shimazaki (島﨑 信長, Shimazaki Nobunaga; born December 6, 1988) is a Japanese voice actor affiliated with Aoni Production. He won the Best Rookie Actor Award at the 7th Seiyu Awards and the Best Actors in Supporting Roles at the 15th Seiyu Awards.

== Biography ==
On January 1, 2023, Shimazaki announced on Twitter that he had married a non-celebrity woman. They welcomed their child on June 1, 2025.

== Filmography ==
=== Anime ===
Year	Title	Role	Other notes
2009	Anyamaru Tantei Kiruminzuu	Hayate Chii	
2010	SD Gundam Sangokuden Brave Battle Warriors	Sun Quan (Son Ken) Gundam	
2010	Giant Killing	Shingo Yano	
2011	Battle Spirits: Heroes	Antony Stark	
2011	Fate/Zero	Assassin	Episode 3
2011	Nura: Rise of the Yokai Clan: Demon Capital	Te no Me	
2011	Sekai-ichi Hatsukoi	Editor (ep 1), Guest (ep 6)	
2011	Sekai-ichi Hatsukoi 2	Editor	
2011	Shakugan no Shana III Final	Orobas	
2011	Sket Dance	Eiichi Hiraizumi	Episodes 33, 34
2011	Hanasaku Iroha	Student B, Student G	
2011	Tamayura ~Hitotose~	Male	
2011	Ben-To	Student A	
2011	Croisée in a Foreign Labyrinth	Youth 3	
2012	Waiting in the Summer	Kaito Kirishima	
2012	Kuroko's Basketball	Ryō Sakurai	
2012	Tari Tari	Taichi Tanaka	
2012	Say I Love You	Kenji Nakanishi	
2012	Bodacious Space Pirates	Navigator, Hall Announcement, Pirate, Barbalusa Crewmember	
2012	Muv-Luv Alternative: Total Eclipse	Imperial Army Guard B, Petty Officer A, Young Man Soldier	
2012	Medaka Box Abnormal	Haru Ushibukagara	
2012	Joshiraku	Kabuki Actor 3	
2012	Kimi to Boku 2	Yanagi, Male Student 3	
2012	Love, Election and Chocolate	Yugumo SP 2	
2012	Psycho-Pass	Cleaning Worker	
2012	Senki Zesshou Symphogear	Audience 2	
2013	You're Being Summoned, Azazel Z	Namioka	
2013	Date A Live	Shidō Itsuka	
2013	Photo Kano	Kazuya Maeda	
2013	Free! - Iwatobi Swim Club	Haruka Nanase	
2013	Kuroko's Basketball 2nd Season	Ryō Sakurai	
2013	Ace of Diamond	Satoru Furuya	
2013	The Severing Crime Edge	Kotarō Naruto	
2013	The Pet Girl of Sakurasou	Iori Himemiya	
2013	Chronicles of the Going Home Club	Live Commentary	Episode 7
2013	Kotoura-san	Male Student	Episode 2
2013	Kyousougiga	Soldier at the Shrine	
2013	Oreshura	Male Student	Episode 1
2013	Silver Spoon	Shinnosuke Aikawa	
2014	Silver Spoon 2nd Season	Shinnosuke Aikawa	
2014	Kenzen Robo Daimidaler	Kōichi Madanbashi	
2014	Pupa	Utsutsu Hasegawa	
2014	Buddy Complex	Tarjim Vasily	
2014	Nobunagun	Mahesh Mirza/Mahatma Gandhi	
2014	Nobunaga The Fool	Oda Nobukatsu	
2014	Date A Live II	Shidō Itsuka	
2014	Soredemo Sekai wa Utsukushii	Livius I	
2014	Glasslip	Yukinari Imi	
2014	Free! Eternal Summer	Haruka Nanase	
2014	Buddy Complex Kanketsu-hen: Ano Sora Ni Kaeru Mirai de	Tarjim Vasily	
2014	Ōkami Shōjo to Kuro Ōji	Yoshito Kimura	
2014	Parasyte	Shinichi Izumi	
2014	Gonna be the Twin-Tail!!	Sōji Mitsuka, Crab Guildy	
2014	Orenchi no Furo Jijō	Tatsumi	
2014	Barakamon	Seishuu Handa	
2015	Ace of Diamond: Second Season	Satoru Furuya	
2015	Kuroko's Basketball 3rd Season	Ryō Sakurai	
2015	Fafner in the Azure: EXODUS	Reo Mikado	
2015	My Love Story!!	Makoto Sunakawa	
2015	Mikagura School Suite	Shigure Ninomiya	
2015	Vampire Holmes	Hudson	
2015	Ima, Futari no Michi	Kunpei Satou	
2015	World Trigger	Hyuse	
2015	Aquarion Logos	Akira Kaibuki	
2015	Makura no Danshi	Nao Sasayama	
2016	Active Raid	Takeru Kuroki	
2016	Assassination Classroom 2nd Season	God of Death	
2016	Classicaloid	Sōsuke Kagura	
2016	Fate/Grand Order: First Order	Ritsuka Fujimaru	
2016	Grimgar of Fantasy and Ash	Manato	
2016	Handa-kun	Handa Sei	
2016	Haruchika	Maren Sei	
2016	Kiss Him, Not Me	Asuma Mutsumi	
2016	Kiznaiver	Tsuguhito Yuta	
2016	Mobile Suit Gundam: Iron-Blooded Orphans S2	Iok Kujan	
2016	Nijiiro Days	Keiichi Katakura	
2016	Servamp	Licht Jekylland Todoroki	
2016	Shōnen Maid	Madoka Takatori	
2016	The Disastrous Life of Saiki K.	Shun Kaidō	
2017	Kabukibu!	Hanamichi Niwa	
2017	Scum's Wish	Mugi Awaya	
2017	Star-Myu: High School Star Musical 2	Riku Ageha	
2017	Digimon Universe: Appli Monsters	Naito Unryūji	
2017	Eromanga Sensei	Kunimitsu Shidō	
2017	18if	Haruto Tsukishiro	
2017	Children of the Whales	Suō	
2017	Altair: A Record of Battles	Kiliç Orhan	
2017	Black Clover	Yuno	
2017	Sengoku Night Blood	Mitsuhide Akechi	
2017	Vatican Miracle Examiner	Thomas Simeon	
2018	The Disastrous Life of Saiki K. 2	Shun Kaidō	
2018	Dances with the Dragons	Gayus Levina Sorel	
2018	Baki: Most Evil Death Row Convicts	Baki Hanma	
2018	Mr. Tonegawa: Middle Management Blues	Jirō Saemonsaburō	
2018	Free! Dive to the Future	Haruka Nanase	
2018	Sword Art Online: Alicization	Eugeo	
2018	A Certain Magical Index III	Ollerus	
2018	Lupin the 3rd Part V: Misadventures in France	Goro Yatagarasu	
2019	Revisions	Chang Gai Steiner	
2019	Date A Live III	Shido Itsuka	
2019	Ace of Diamond Act II	Satoru Furuya	
2019	Fruits Basket	Yuki Sōma	
2019	Inazuma Eleven: Orion no Kokuin	Petronio Patti	
2019	Afterlost	Tsubasa	
2019	Star-Myu: High School Star Musical 3	Riku Ageha	
2019	The Ones Within	Shinya Kudou	
2019	Astra Lost in Space	Charce Lacroix	
2019	Fate/Grand Order - Absolute Demonic Front: Babylonia	Ritsuka Fujimaru	
2019	Special 7: Special Crime Investigation Unit	Black Pearl	
2019	Levius	Levius Cromwell	
2019	The Disastrous Life of Saiki K.: Reawakened	Shun Kaidō	
2020	Fruits Basket: 2nd Season	Yuki Sōma	
2020	Jujutsu Kaisen	Mahito	
2020	Haikyuu!!: To The Top	Rintarō Suna	
2021	Bottom-tier Character Tomozaki	Takahiro Mizusawa	
2021	World Trigger 2nd Season	Hyuse	
2021	Those Snow White Notes	Setsu Sawamura	
2021	Fruits Basket: The Final	Yuki Sōma	
2021	The World Ends with You: The Animation	Eiji Oji	
2021	One Piece	Shanks (young)	
2021	Osamake	Kai Tetsuhiko	
2021	So I'm a Spider, So What?	Sajin / Shinobu Kusama	
2021	Night Head 2041	Naoya Kirihara	
2021	Baki Hanma	Baki Hanma	
2021	Visual Prison	Mist Flaive	
2021	World Trigger 3rd Season	Hyuse	
2021	The Night Beyond the Tricornered Window	Kosuke Mikado	
2021	Lupin the 3rd Part 6	Goro Yatagarasu	
2022	Deaimon	Nagomu Irino	
2022	Kaguya-sama: Love Is War – Ultra Romantic	Previous Student Council President	Episode 9
2022	Heroines Run the Show	Aizō Shibasaki	
2022	Date A Live IV	Shido Itsuka	
2022	Tiger & Bunny 2	Thomas Taurus / He Is Thomas	
2022	Raven of the Inner Palace	Wen Ying (On Kei)	
2022	Bibliophile Princess	Alfred Bernstein	
2022	Legend of Mana: The Teardrop Crystal	Shiloh	
2022	Blue Lock	Seishirō Nagi	
2022	Beast Tamer	Arios Orlando	
2023	High Card	Owen Alldays	
2023	The Vampire Dies in No Time 2nd Season	Kahanshin Tōmei	
2023	Fate/Grand Order: You've Lost Ritsuka Fujimaru	Ritsuka Fujimaru	
2023	Opus Colors	Takumi Yura	
2023	The Dangers in My Heart	Haruya Nanjō	
2023	My Tiny Senpai	Chihiro Akina	
2023	Dark Gathering	Keitarō Gentōga	
2023	Jujutsu Kaisen 2nd Season	Mahito	
2023	Good Night World	AAAAA / Asuma Arima	
2023	Tokyo Revengers: Tenjiku Arc	Izana Kurokawa	
2024	Bottom-tier Character Tomozaki 2nd Stage	Takahiro Mizusawa	
2024	7th Time Loop: The Villainess Enjoys a Carefree Life Married to Her Worst Enemy!	Arnold Hein	
2024	Hokkaido Gals Are Super Adorable!	Tsubasa Shiki	
2024	Mashle: The Divine Visionary Candidate Exam Arc	Kaldo Gehenna	
2024	Oblivion Battery	Shunpei Chihaya	
2024	Gods' Games We Play	Fay	
2024	Wind Breaker	Hayato Suō	
2024	I Was Reincarnated as the 7th Prince so I Can Take My Time Perfecting My Magical Ability	Jade	
2024	Cardfight!! Vanguard DivineZ 2nd Season	Kuon Aikawa	
2024	No Longer Allowed in Another World	Wolf	
2024	Acro Trip	Chrome	
2024	Is It Wrong to Try to Pick Up Girls in a Dungeon? V	Hedin Selland	
2024	Murai in Love	Hitotose	
2024	Orb: On the Movements of the Earth	Kolbe	
2025	Sakamoto Days	Shin Asakura	
2025	To Be Hero X	E-soul / Yang Cheng	
2025	Kinnikuman: Perfect Origin Arc	Pentagon	
2025	A Gatherer's Adventure in Isekai	Takeru	
2025	Disney Twisted-Wonderland: The Animation	Silver	
2025	Si-Vis: The Sound of Heroes	Sōji	
2025	Ninja vs. Gokudo	Daijin	
2026	Kunon the Sorcerer Can See	Zeonly Finroll	
2026	Hikuidori	Hikoya	
2026	Akane-banashi	Maikeru Arakawa	
2026	Ace of Diamond Act II season 2	Satoru Furuya	
2026	The Classroom of a Black Cat and a Witch	Claude Sirius	
2026	The Villager of Level 999	Rex	
2026	The Ogre's Bride	Ouga Kiyama	
2026	The World Is Dancing	Oniyasha (young adult)	
2026	A Tale of the Secret Saint	Cyril Sutherland	
2026	Magical Explorer	Kōsuke Takioto	
2027	Arcanadea	Shōgo Kuga	
2027	Historié	Eumenes	

=== Theatrical animation ===
Year	Movie	Role
2013	Aura: Maryūinkōga Saigo no Tatakai	Ichirō Satō
2015	Date A Live: Mayuri Judgement	Shido Itsuka
2015	High Speed! Free! Starting Days	Haruka Nanase
2016	Your Name	Tsukasa Fujii
2017	Kuroko's Basketball The Movie: Last Game	Ryō Sakurai
2017	Free! Timeless Medley: The Bond	Haruka Nanase
2017	Blame!	Fusata
2017	Free Timeless Medley: The Promise	Haruka Nanase
2017	Free! Take Your Marks	Haruka Nanase
2017	Trinity Seven the Movie: The Eternal Library and the Alchemist Girl	Last Trinity
2018	Servamp -Alice in the Garden-	Licht Jekylland Todoroki
2019	Crayon Shin-chan: Honeymoon Hurricane ~The Lost Hiroshi~	
2019	Free! Road to the World - The Dream	Haruka Nanase
2020	Love Me, Love Me Not	Rio Yamamoto
2020	Happy-Go-Lucky Days	Tanabe-kun
2020	Fate/Grand Order: Camelot - Wandering: Agaterám	Ritsuka Fujimaru
2020	Kono Sekai no Tanoshimikata: Secret Story Film	Aizo
2021	Fate/Grand Order: Camelot - Paladin: Agaterám	Ritsuka Fujimaru
2021	Fate/Grand Order Final Singularity - Grand Temple of Time: Solomon	Ritsuka Fujimaru
2021	Free! The Final Stroke Part 1	Haruka Nanase
2021	Summer Ghost	Ryō Kobayashi
2022	Fruits Basket: Prelude	Yuki Sōma
2022	Blue Thermal	Jun Kuramochi
2022	Free! The Final Stroke Part 2	Haruka Nanase
2023	Black Clover: Sword of the Wizard King	Yuno
2023	Sasaki and Miyano: Graduation	Akira Kagiura
2024	Blue Lock: Episode Nagi	Seishirō Nagi
2025	Miss Kobayashi's Dragon Maid: A Lonely Dragon Wants to Be Loved	Azad

=== Drama CD ===
- Dear Vocalist as JOSHUA
- Hana no Bakumatsu Koi Suru Cho as Soji Okita
- Heart no Kakurega as Kawakura Haruto
- Heroic Spirit Lore Strange Tales ～ King of the Cavern Edmond Dantès ～ as Edmond Dantès
- humANdroid Vol. 03 Type H
- Ikemen Vampire: Temptation in the Dark - as Napoleon Bonaparte
- Kiss x Kiss Vol.24 as Takashi Arimura
- Minato's Laundromat as Shintaro
- Vanquish Brothers as Nobunaga
- WRITERZ as Ran Hirukawa

=== Video games ===
2010

- Gods Eater Burst (Federico Caruso)
- Fist of the North Star: Ken's Rage (younger Thouzer)

2011

- Suto*Mani: Strobe*Mania (Yayoi Saijo)

2013

- Dynasty Warriors 8 (Guan Xing)
- Geten no Hana (Mori Ranmaru)
- Super Robot Wars UX (Sun Quan/Sonken Gundam)

2014

- Atelier Shallie (Albert Perriend)
- Shining Resonance (Yuuma Irvan)
- God Eater 2: Rage Burst (Teruomi Makabe)
- Granblue Fantasy (Jamil)

2015

- Mobius Final Fantasy (Wol)
- BlazBlue: Central Fiction (Naoto Kurogane)
- Closers (Haruto Kaguragi)
- Fire Emblem Fates (Male Kamui/Corrin, Male Kanna)
- Xenoblade Chronicles X (HB)

2016

- Super Smash Bros. 4 (Male Kamui/Corrin's Japanese voice) (DLC)
- Fate/Grand Order (Arjuna, King of the Cavern Edmond Dantès, Protagonist)
- Super Robot Wars OG: Moon Dwellers (Touya Shiun)

2017

- Onmyōji (Yōko, Yōkinshi)
- Accel World vs. Sword Art Online: Millennium Twilight (Eugeo) (DLC)
- Sword Art Online: Hollow Realization (Eugeo) (DLC)
- Fire Emblem Heroes (Male Kamui/Corrin)
- Fire Emblem Warriors (Male Kamui/Corrin)
- Xenoblade Chronicles 2 (Akhos)
- Sengoku Night Blood (Akechi Mitsuhide)
- Ikemen Vampire: Temptation in the Dark (Napoleon Bonaparte)
- 7'scarlet (Kagutsuchi Hino)

2018

- Dragalia Lost (Aldred, Barbatos)
- Samurai Love Ballad Party (Fujibayashi Sakuya)
- Warriors Orochi 4 (Guan Xing)

2019

- Astral Chain (Protagonist (Male), Akira Howard (Male))
- BlazBlue: Cross Tag Battle (Naoto Kurogane) (DLC)
- A Certain Magical Index: Imaginary Fest (Ollerus)
- Pokémon Masters EX (Burgh)

2020

- Disney: Twisted-Wonderland (Silver)
- Tetote Connect (Ashihara Yoshihara/Yuhata)
- Olympia Soirée (Riku)

2021

- Genshin Impact (Kaedehara Kazuha)
- Identity V (Andrew Kreiss)
- Arknights (Tequila)
- Samurai Warriors 5 (Nobunaga Oda)
- Alchemy Stars (Corax)
- Cookie Run: Kingdom (Clover Cookie)

2022

- Dragon Quest X Offline (Hussar)
- Dragon Quest Treasures (Gustav, Monsters)

2023

- Sword Art Online: Last Recollection (Eugeo)
- JoJo's Bizarre Adventure: All Star Battle R (Toru)

2024

- Jujutsu Kaisen: Cursed Clash (Mahito)

2025

- Groove Coaster: Future Performers (Ren Urushiba)

2026

- Dark Auction (Christoph Treheim von Berg)

=== Dubbing ===
==== Live-action ====
- 100 Things to Do Before High School (Fenwick Frazier (Jaheem King Toombs))
- Alita: Battle Angel (Hugo (Keean Johnson))
- Death Note (2017) (Light Turner (Nat Wolff))
- Game of Thrones (Joffrey Baratheon (Jack Gleeson), Euron Greyjoy (Pilou Asbæk))
- IF (Magician Mouse (Sebastian Maniscalco))
- The Kill Team (Andrew Briggman (Nat Wolff))
- Maurice (2019 Movie Plus edition) (Clive Durham (Hugh Grant))
- Mortal Engines (Tom Natsworthy (Robert Sheehan))

==== Animation ====
- Ice Age: Continental Drift (Gupta)
- Isle of Dogs (Editor Hiroshi)
- Mo Dao Zhu Shi (Wen Ning)
