= High Speed! Free! Starting Days =

- Theatrical release poster
- Directed by: Yasuhiro Takemoto
- Written by: Masahiro Yokotani; Maiko Nishioka
- Based on: High Speed! by Koji Oji
- Starring: Nobunaga Shimazaki; Tatsuhisa Suzuki; Toshiyuki Toyonaga; Kouki Uchiyama; Mamoru Miyano; Yoshimasa Hosoya; Kenji Nojima; Satoshi Hino; Chihiro Suzuki
- Cinematography: Kazuya Takao
- Music by: Tatsuya Kato
- Production companies: Kyoto Animation; Animation Do
- Distributed by: Shochiku
- Release date: December 5, 2015
- Running time: 110 minutes
- Country: Japan
- Language: Japanese
- Box office: ¥691 million

High Speed! Free! Starting Days (映画 ハイ☆スピード！-Free! Starting Days-, Eiga Hai Supīdo! Free! Starting Days) is a 2015 Japanese animated film produced by Kyoto Animation and Animation Do. The plot is loosely based on the second volume of the High Speed! light novels by Koji Oji, the series that inspired the Free! animated series. The film centers on Haruka Nanase as a junior high student, where he and his friends learn the meaning of teamwork as they join the swim team.

High Speed! Free! Starting Days was released nationwide in Japanese theaters on December 5, 2015, to moderate success, ranking #5 on its opening weekend and being nominated for Best Picture in the Newtype Anime Awards. Funimation has licensed the film for North American release in 2018 along with Free! Timeless Medley and Free! Take Your Marks.

== Plot ==
Haruka Nanase begins his first year at Iwatobi Middle School. After discovering that Haruka and his childhood friend, Makoto Tachibana, had once been part of the Iwatobi Swim Club, Asahi Shiina urges them to join the swim team despite Haruka's lack of interest, while Kisumi Shigino suggests they join the basketball team. Natsuya Kirishima, the captain of the swim team, visits their class and successfully convinces Haruka, Makoto, Asahi, and his younger brother Ikuya to join.

At the first swim practice, Haruka ties Natsuya in a race for the right to swim only freestyle. Asahi, however, loses confidence in swimming. Ikuya, frustrated over Natsuya's admiration of Haruka's skill, begins to imitate Haruka in hopes of gaining his brother's attention again. Nao Serizawa, the vice captain, asks Makoto if he enjoys swimming or is only in the club to be with Haruka, confusing Makoto and putting distance between the best friends. The team's individual struggles affect their performance, especially during the team medley. Later, Haruka's mother leaves for a week, leaving Haruka on his own.

During a joint practice with Sano Middle School, Sosuke Yamazaki challenges Haruka to a match race, having heard about him from Rin Matsuoka, Haruka's rival. However, Iwatobi loses the team medley, leaving him disappointed as he gives him Rin's letter. As Iwatobi's swim team mulls over their defeat, Haruka confronts Makoto about his uncharacteristic behavior, to which Makoto realizes that he loves swimming and Haruka equally, restoring their bond. The next day, Ikuya threatens to quit the team and confides to Haruka, Makoto, and Asahi about feeling lonely and abandoned by Natsuya. After affirming their friendship, Ikuya makes amends with him. When the four visit Nao, who is getting surgery for a detached retina, he offers them advice on their strengths as individuals and as a team, giving them hope. On the way home, however, Haruka faints, leading Makoto, Asahi, and Ikuya to stay at his house until his mother returns.

At the prefectural tournament, Haruka, Makoto, Asahi, and Ikuya place first in the team medley. Afterwards, Sosuke tells Haruka that while Rin's letter was addressed to him, it was probably meant for Haruka instead. The letter details the setbacks Rin has faced in Australia and his desire to swim like Haruka. With this in mind, Haruka becomes determined to become a better swimmer with his team.

== Production ==
On March 22, 2015, Kyoto Animation announced that a film for High Speed! (ハイ☆スピード！, Hai Supīdo!), the original light novel by Koji Oji that had inspired the Free! animated series, had been green-lit during the Free! Eternal Summer Special Event. The film is a loose adaptation of the second volume, which was also penned by Oji.

Several cast members from the television series returned to reprise their roles, including Nobunaga Shimazaki, Tatsuhisa Suzuki, Mamoru Miyano, and Yoshimasa Hosoya. Yasuhiro Takemoto was announced as the director of the film, while several staff members who had worked on the television series returned, including head writer Masahiro Yokotani, art director Joji Unogochi, and soundtrack composer Tatsuya Kato, among others. In September 2015, the film's official website had announced new additions to the cast, including Toshiyuki Toyonaga as Asahi, Kouki Uchiyama as Ikuya, Kenji Nojima as Natsuya, and Satoshi Hino as Nao. Nagisa Hazuki and Rei Ryugazaki, two characters from the main cast of the original Free! series, appear in the film with minor roles.

High Speed! Free! Starting Days was released in theaters on December 5, 2015. The film's theme song, "Aching Horns", was performed by Oldcodex. The song was released as a single on December 18, 2015. It debuted at #10 on Oricon and charted for eight weeks. Funimation acquired the rights for High Speed! Free! Starting Days for distribution in North America, along with the Free! Timeless Medley movie trilogy, including Free! Take Your Marks. All films were released as a set in October 2018.

== Reception ==
High Speed! Free! Starting Days opened at #5 in 120 theaters nationwide, selling 60,729 tickets in the first two days and earning ¥95,546,400. The film made ¥691 million at box office.

The home release debuted at #1 on both Oricon's DVD and Blu-ray charts. The limited edition of the Blu-ray release sold 14,642 copies on its first week. The limited edition of the DVD release debuted at #1 with 9,677 copies sold on its first week, while the regular edition debuted at #13 with 822 DVDs sold.

High Speed! Free! Starting Days ranked #5 in Best Picture in the 2015–2016 Newtype Anime Awards. The film also ranked #3 in Animation of the Year by fans for the 2017 Tokyo Anime Award, with a total of 16,094 votes.

== Soundtrack ==
High Speed! Free! Starting Days Original Soundtrack: Pure Blue Scenes

Soundtrack album by Tatsuya Kato
- Released: December 16, 2015
- Label: Lantis
- Producer: Tatsuya Kato

Tatsuya Kato chronology
High Speed! Free! Starting Days Original Soundtrack: Pure Blue Scenes (2015)	Free! Timeless Medley Original Soundtrack: Bond and Promise (2017)

The original soundtrack was produced by Tatsuya Kato, and it was released on December 16, 2015, under the name High Speed! Free! Starting Days Original Soundtrack: Pure Blue Scenes (『映画 ハイ☆スピード!-Free! Starting Days-』オリジナルサウンドトラック「Pure Blue Scenes」). The soundtrack debuted at #42 on Oricon and charted for three weeks.

All tracks are written by Tatsuya Kato.

No.	Title	Lyrics	Music	Arrangement	Length
1.	"A Boy Toward the Water"	—	Tatsuya Kato	Tatsuya Kato
2.	"Feel the Water"	—	Tatsuya Kato	Tatsuya Kato
3.	"Pure Blue Starting"	—	Tatsuya Kato	Tatsuya Kato
4.	"Precious Words"	—	Tatsuya Kato	Tatsuya Kato
5.	"First Conversation"	—	Tatsuya Kato	Tatsuya Kato
6.	"Hazy Feelings"	—	Tatsuya Kato	Tatsuya Kato
7.	"Pleasant Daytime"	—	Tatsuya Kato	Tatsuya Kato
8.	"A Chance to Join"	—	Tatsuya Kato	Tatsuya Kato
9.	"Heated Race"	—	Tatsuya Kato	Tatsuya Kato
10.	"Fresh Members"	—	Tatsuya Kato	Tatsuya Kato
11.	"Even Match"	—	Tatsuya Kato	Tatsuya Kato
12.	"Going Well"	—	Tatsuya Kato	Tatsuya Kato
13.	"Heartrending"	—	Tatsuya Kato	Tatsuya Kato
14.	"Mental Training"	—	Tatsuya Kato	Tatsuya Kato
15.	"Comical Days"	—	Tatsuya Kato	Tatsuya Kato
16.	"Tender Coach"	—	Tatsuya Kato	Tatsuya Kato
17.	"Dissonance"	—	Tatsuya Kato	Tatsuya Kato
18.	"Feelings of Discomfort"	—	Tatsuya Kato	Tatsuya Kato
19.	"Serious Agony"	—	Tatsuya Kato	Tatsuya Kato
20.	"Facing Myself"	—	Tatsuya Kato	Tatsuya Kato
21.	"Several Conflict"	—	Tatsuya Kato	Tatsuya Kato
22.	"True Feelings"	—	Tatsuya Kato	Tatsuya Kato
23.	"Lost Game"	—	Tatsuya Kato	Tatsuya Kato
24.	"Unforgettable Memory"	—	Tatsuya Kato	Tatsuya Kato
25.	"My True Self"	—	Tatsuya Kato	Tatsuya Kato
26.	"Pure Feelings for You"	—	Tatsuya Kato	Tatsuya Kato
27.	"Dear Brother"	—	Tatsuya Kato	Tatsuya Kato
28.	"A Step Forward"	—	Tatsuya Kato	Tatsuya Kato
29.	"Compass to Tomorrow"	—	Tatsuya Kato	Tatsuya Kato
30.	"Amiable Dinner"	—	Tatsuya Kato	Tatsuya Kato
31.	"True Friends"	—	Tatsuya Kato	Tatsuya Kato
32.	"Starting Days"	—	Tatsuya Kato	Tatsuya Kato
33.	"Sense of Unity"	—	Tatsuya Kato	Tatsuya Kato
34.	"Best Swim, Best Team"	—	Tatsuya Kato	Tatsuya Kato
35.	"Starting to the Future"	—	Tatsuya Kato	Tatsuya Kato
36.	"The Trailer of "High Speed!""	—	Tatsuya Kato	Tatsuya Kato
37.	"The Beginning of "High Speed!""	—	Tatsuya Kato	Tatsuya Kato

== Media ==
=== Manga ===
To promote the film, a manga adaptation of High Speed! was released, with artwork provided by Shiori Teshirogi.

No.	Title	Japanese release date	Japanese ISBN
1	Hai Supīdo! Komikaraizu Ue-maki (ハイ☆スピード! コミカライズ 上巻)	August 14, 2015	978-4907064358
2	Hai Supīdo! Komikaraizu Shita-maki (ハイ☆スピード! コミカライズ 下巻)	August 14, 2015	978-4907064365

=== Drama CD ===
A drama CD titled High Speed! Free! Starting Days: Drama CD: Iwatobi Middle School Swim Team Activities Diary (『映画 ハイ☆スピード!-Free! Starting Days-』ドラマCD「岩鳶中学水泳部 活動日誌」, Eiga Hai Supīdo! Free! Starting Days: Dorama CD Iwatobi Chūgaku Suiei-bu Katsudō Nisshi) was released on February 17, 2016, with cast members reprising their roles. The CD debuted at #13 on the Oricon Weekly Albums Chart.
