= Kyoto Animation =

Japanese animation studio

Kyoto Animation Co., Ltd.
- The current Kyoto Animation logo used since 2006, based on the flag and emblem of Kyoto Prefecture

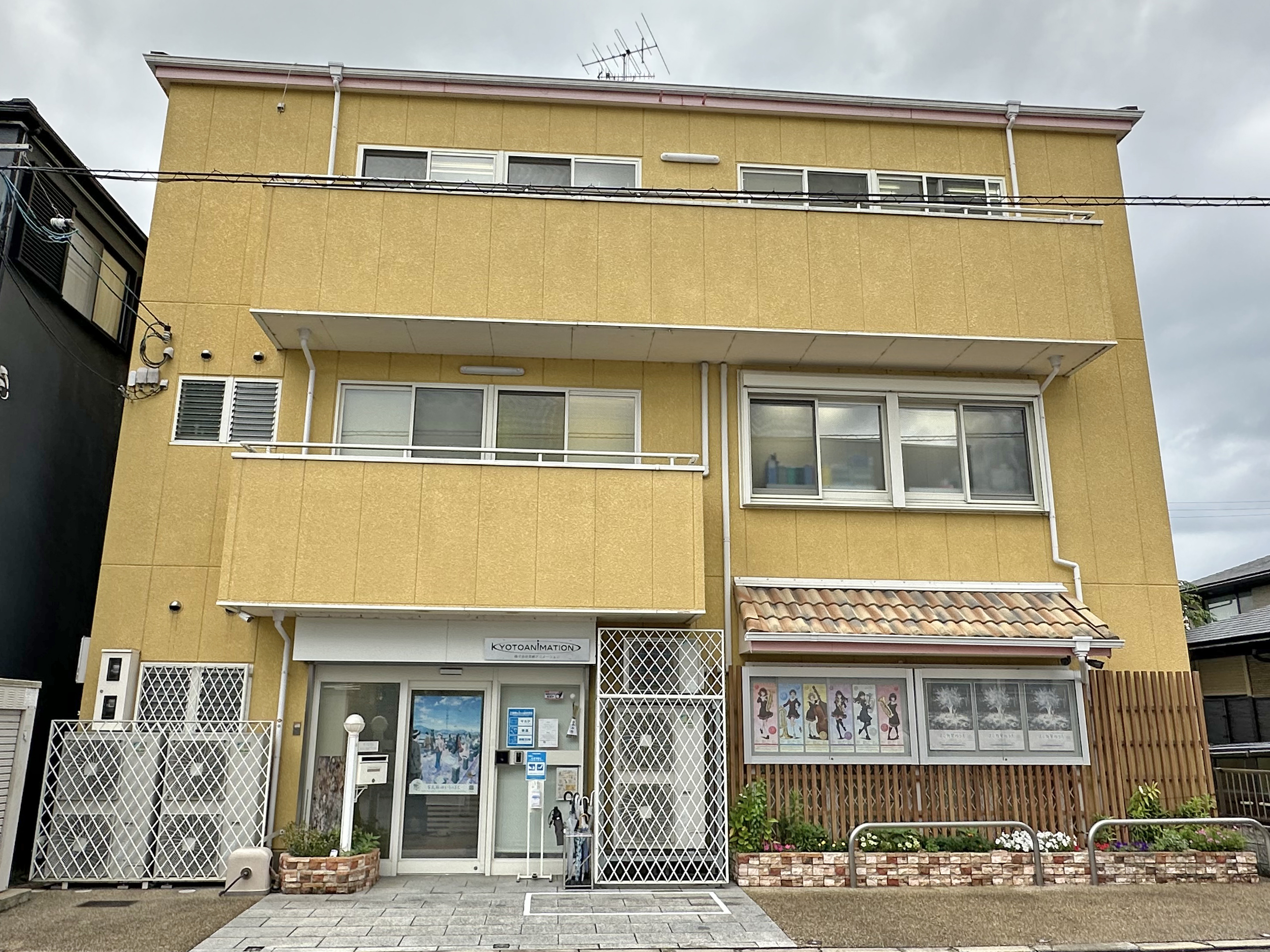
- Kyoto Animation headquarters in Uji, Kyoto Prefecture
- Native name: 株式会社京都アニメーション
- Romanized name: Kabushiki-gaisha Kyōto Animēshon
- Type: Kabushiki gaisha
- Industry: Japanese animation Print media publisher (mainly light novels)
- Predecessor: Mushi Production
- Founded: 1981; 45 years ago July 12, 1985; 41 years ago (As a limited company)
- Headquarters: 32 Oseto, Kohata, Uji, Kyoto Prefecture, Japan 611-0002
- Key people: Hideaki Hatta (president; 1985–2026); Shinichiro Hatta (president; since February 2026); Yoko Hatta (vice president)
- Number of employees: 180 (2022)
- Subsidiaries: Animation Do (2010–2020, absorbed)
- Website: kyotoanimation.co.jp/en/

Kyoto Animation Co., Ltd. (Japanese: 株式会社京都アニメーション, Hepburn: Kabushiki-gaisha Kyōto Animēshon), often abbreviated KyoAni (京アニ, Kyōani), is a Japanese animation studio and light novel publisher located in Uji, Kyoto Prefecture. It was founded in 1981 by husband and wife Hideaki Hatta, who remained as president until his death in 2026, and Yoko Hatta, who remains as vice president, along with a number of Mushi Production staff members; although the present enterprise dates to July 12, 1985.

Kyoto Animation has produced anime films and series including The Melancholy of Haruhi Suzumiya (2006), Clannad (2007), K-On! (2009), Nichijou (2011), Love, Chunibyo & Other Delusions (2012), Free! (2013), Sound! Euphonium (2015), A Silent Voice (2016), Miss Kobayashi's Dragon Maid (2017), and Violet Evergarden (2018).

== History ==
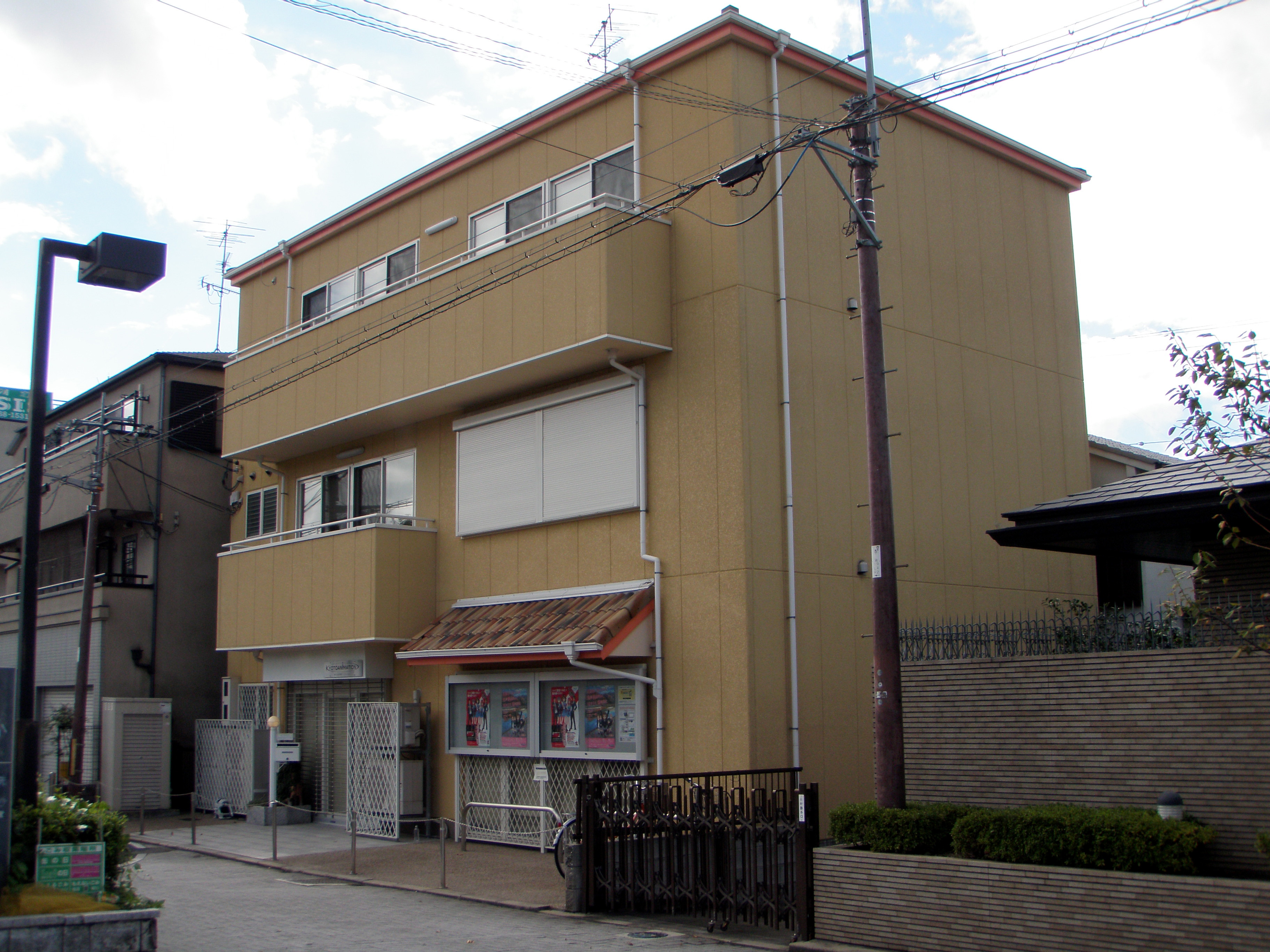
Kyoto Animation's head office, studio 2

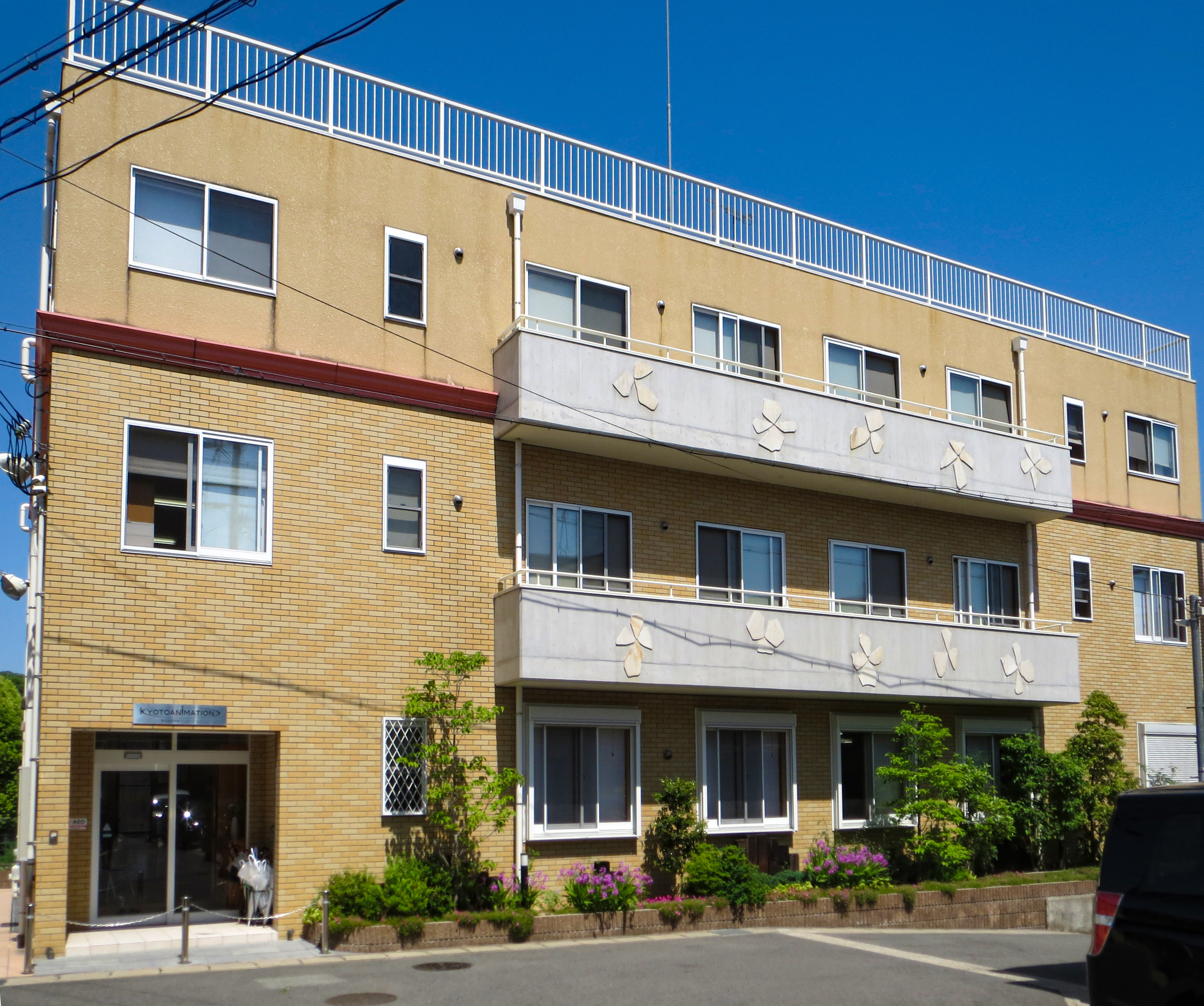
Kyoto Animation's first studio in Fushimi-ku, Kyoto, Japan, prior to the 2019 arson attack

Kyoto Animation was co-founded in 1981 by married couple Yoko and Hideaki Hatta; it became a limited company in 1985 and a corporation in 1999. Yoko Hatta, who serves as the company's vice president, had worked as a painter at Mushi Production until she moved to Kyoto after marrying her husband, who served as president. The company's logo originates from the kanji kyō (京), the first character of Kyoto (京都).

Since 2009, Kyoto Animation has hosted the annual Kyoto Animation Awards in three categories: original novels, manga, and scenarios. Some winning submissions are published under the company's KA Esuma Bunko imprint, and have a chance of being later adapted as anime. Love, Chunibyo & Other Delusions, Free!, Beyond the Boundary and Myriad Colors Phantom World were based on novels that received an honorable mention in this competition. In 2014, the novel Violet Evergarden became the first and only work so far to win a grand prize in any of the three categories.

Unlike most animation studios, the company's employees are salaried rather than freelance workers, and are trained in-house. These practices have been cited as encouraging employees to focus on frame quality rather than production quotas. The company has received praise for the positive treatment of its staff, and was honored by Women in Animation with its Diversity Award in 2020 for its efforts in creating a gender-balanced workforce and encouraging women to enter the industry.

In April 2020, the company announced that it would put its work on hiatus for one month due to the COVID-19 pandemic, later extending the period to the end of May.

In March 2026, Kyoto Animation publicly announced the death of its president Hideaki Hatta in February; he is succeeded as president and CEO by Shinichiro Hatta.

=== Animation Do ===
An affiliate company, Animation Do Co., Ltd. (株式会社アニメーションドゥウ, Kabushiki-gaisha Animēshon Dū), was established in 2000 to assist production at Kyoto Animation. Originally established as the studio's Osaka office, it was incorporated as a limited company in 2000, then a corporation in 2010. Both companies are run by Hideaki Hatta and are run jointly as one. They produce up-and-coming works under the Animation Do label with Kyoto Animation as their main contractor and works where they work as one company alongside Kyoto Animation. They work on most Kyoto Animation projects and many of them have joint signatures. On September 16, 2020, it was announced by the National Printing Bureau's Kanpō publication that Kyoto Animation absorbed Animation Do, which includes all rights and associated properties.

=== 2019 arson attack ===
On the morning of July 18, 2019, at around 10:31 a.m, an arson fire at Kyoto Animation's first studio in Fushimi killed 36 people (including directors Yasuhiro Takemoto and Yoshiji Kigami), injured 34 others (including the suspect) in varying degrees, and destroyed most of the building's materials and computers. The suspect, 41-year-old Shinji Aoba, later admitted to committing the attack and was sentenced to death in January 2024.

== Productions ==
In the tables below, only the productions for which Kyoto Animation was a lead producer are listed.

=== Anime television series ===
Year	Title	Network	Director(s)	Eps.	Note(s)	Refs.
2003	Full Metal Panic? Fumoffu	Fuji Television	Yasuhiro Takemoto	11 (Note: An original video animation (OVA) episode of Full Metal Panic? Fumoffu was released on November 26, 2003.)	Spin-off adaptation of the light novels Full Metal Panic! by Shoji Gatoh	
2005	Air	BS-TBS	Tatsuya Ishihara	13 (Note: Two special episodes of Air, entitled Air in Summer, aired on August 28 and September 4, 2005.)	Adaptation of the visual novel by Key	
2005	Full Metal Panic! The Second Raid	Wowow	Yasuhiro Takemoto	13 (Note: An original video animation (OVA) episode of Full Metal Panic! The Second Raid was released on May 26, 2006.)	Sequel to the 2002 anime television series by Gonzo	
2006	The Melancholy of Haruhi Suzumiya	Chiba TV	Tatsuya Ishihara; Yutaka Yamamoto (Note: Series Unit Director (シリーズ演出))	14	Adaptation of the Haruhi Suzumiya light novels by Nagaru Tanigawa	
2006–2007	Kanon	TBS	Tatsuya Ishihara	24	Adaptation of the visual novel by Key	
2007	Lucky Star	Chiba TV	Yutaka Yamamoto (#1–4); Yasuhiro Takemoto (#5–24)	24	Adaptation of the manga by Kagami Yoshimizu	
2007–2008	Clannad	TBS	Tatsuya Ishihara	22 (Note: An extra episode of Clannad aired on March 28, 2008. An original video animation (OVA) episode was released on July 16, 2008.)	Adaptation of the visual novel by Key	
2008–2009	Clannad After Story	TBS	Tatsuya Ishihara	22 (Note: An extra episode of Clannad After Story aired on March 20, 2009, and a summary episode aired on March 27, 2009. An original video animation (OVA) episode was released on July 1, 2009.)	Sequel to Clannad.	
2009	Sora o Miageru Shōjo no Hitomi ni Utsuru Sekai	Chiba TV	Yoshiji Kigami	9	Sequel to Munto 2: Beyond the Walls of Time	
2009	The Melancholy of Haruhi Suzumiya	Chiba TV	Tatsuya Ishihara; Yutaka Yamamoto	28	Rebroadcast of The Melancholy of Haruhi Suzumiya with fourteen new episodes	
2009	K-On!	TBS	Naoko Yamada	12 (Note: An extra episode of K-On! aired on June 26, 2009. An original video animation (OVA) episode was released on January 20, 2010.)	Adaptation of the manga by Kakifly	
2010	K-On!!	TBS	Naoko Yamada	24 (Note: Two extra episodes of K-On!! aired on September 22 and 29, 2010. An original video animation (OVA) episode was released on March 16, 2011.)	Sequel to K-On!	
2011	Nichijou	TV Aichi	Tatsuya Ishihara	26	Adaptation of the manga by Keiichi Arawi	
2012	Hyouka	Chiba TV	Yasuhiro Takemoto	22	Adaptation of the Classic Literature Club novels by Honobu Yonezawa	
2012	Love, Chunibyo & Other Delusions	Tokyo MX	Tatsuya Ishihara	12 (Note: An original video animation (OVA) episode of Love, Chunibyo & Other Delusions was released on June 19, 2013.)	Adaptation of the light novels by Torako.	
2013	Tamako Market	Tokyo MX	Naoko Yamada	12	Original series from the team who worked on K-On!	
2013	Free! Iwatobi Swim Club	ABC Asahi	Hiroko Utsumi	12	Sequel to the light novel High Speed! by Kōji Ōji. Collaboration with Animation Do.	
2013	Beyond the Boundary	TBS, Tokyo MX	Taichi Ishidate	12 (Note: An original video animation (OVA) episode of Beyond the Boundary was released on July 2, 2014.)	Adaptation of light novels by Nagomu Torii	
2014	Love, Chunibyo and Other Delusions! Heart Throb	TBS, Tokyo MX	Tatsuya Ishihara	12 (Note: An original video animation (OVA) episode of Love, Chunibyo and Other Delusions! Heart Throb was released on September 17, 2014.)	Sequel to Love, Chunibyo & Other Delusions	
2014	Free! Eternal Summer	ABC Asahi	Hiroko Utsumi	13 (Note: An original video animation (OVA) episode of Free! Eternal Summer was released on March 18, 2015.)	Sequel to Free! Iwatobi Swim Club. Collaboration with Animation Do	
2014	Amagi Brilliant Park	TBS	Yasuhiro Takemoto	13 (Note: An original video animation (OVA) episode of Amagi Brilliant Park was released on June 26, 2015.)	Adaptation of the light novels by Shoji Gatoh	
2015	Sound! Euphonium	Tokyo MX	Tatsuya Ishihara; Naoko Yamada	13 (Note: An original video animation (OVA) episode of Sound! Euphonium was released on December 16, 2015.)	Adaptation of the novel by Ayano Takeda	
2016	Myriad Colors Phantom World	Tokyo MX	Tatsuya Ishihara	13 (Note: An original video animation (OVA) episode of Myriad Colors Phantom World was released on October 5, 2016.)	Adaptation of the light novel by Sōichirō Hatano	
2016	Sound! Euphonium 2	Tokyo MX	Tatsuya Ishihara; Naoko Yamada	13	Sequel to Sound! Euphonium	
2017	Miss Kobayashi's Dragon Maid	Tokyo MX	Yasuhiro Takemoto	13 (Note: An original video animation (OVA) episode of Miss Kobayashi's Dragon Maid was released on September 20, 2017.)	Adaptation of the manga by Coolkyousinnjya	
2018	Violet Evergarden	Tokyo MX, Netflix	Taichi Ishidate; Haruka Fujita	13 (Note: An original video animation (OVA) episode of Violet Evergarden was released on July 4, 2018.)	Adaptation of the light novel by Kana Akatsuki	
2018	Free! Dive to the Future	ABC Asahi	Eisaku Kawanami	12 (Note: An original video animation (OVA) episode of Free! Dive to the Future was screened at an event on June 23, 2018, and released on September 26, 2018.)	Sequel to Free! Eternal Summer. Collaboration with Animation Do	
2018	Tsurune	NHK	Takuya Yamamura	13 (Note: An original video animation (OVA) episode of Tsurune was released on May 1, 2019.)	Adaptation of the light novel by Kotoko Ayano	
2021	Miss Kobayashi's Dragon Maid S	ABC Asahi	Tatsuya Ishihara; Yasuhiro Takemoto (Note: Credited posthumously as Series Director (シリーズ監督, Shirīzu Kantoku).)	12 (Note: An original video animation (OVA) episode of Miss Kobayashi's Dragon Maid S was released on January 19, 2022.)	Sequel to Miss Kobayashi's Dragon Maid	
2023	Tsurune: The Linking Shot	NHK	Takuya Yamamura	13	Sequel to Tsurune	
2024	Sound! Euphonium 3	NHK E	Tatsuya Ishihara	13	Sequel to Sound! Euphonium 2	
2025	City the Animation	Tokyo MX	Taichi Ishidate	13	Adaptation of the manga by Keiichi Arawi	
2026	Sparks of Tomorrow	Tokyo MX	Minoru Ōta	13	Adaptation of the light novel by Hiro Yuki	
TBA	RuriDragon	TBA	TBA	TBA	Adaptation of the manga by Masaoki Shindo	

=== Anime films ===
Year	Title	Director(s)	Dur.	Note(s)	Refs.
2009	Tenjōbito to Akutobito Saigo no Tatakai	Yoshiji Kigami	83m	Summary of Sora o Miageru Shōjo no Hitomi ni Utsuru Sekai	
2010	The Disappearance of Haruhi Suzumiya	Tatsuya Ishihara (Note: Chief Director (総監督)); Yasuhiro Takemoto	162m	Continuation of The Melancholy of Haruhi Suzumiya	
2011	K-On! The Movie	Naoko Yamada	110m	Original side story to the second season of K-On!	
2013	Love, Chunibyo & Other Delusions: Rikka Version	Tatsuya Ishihara	96m	Summary of the first season of Love, Chunibyo & Other Delusions	
2014	Tamako Love Story	Naoko Yamada	83m	Continuation of Tamako Market	
2015	Beyond the Boundary: I'll Be Here – Past	Taichi Ishidate	86m	Recap of Beyond the Boundary	
2015	Beyond the Boundary: I'll Be Here – Future	Taichi Ishidate	89m	Sequel to Beyond the Boundary	
2015	High Speed! Free! Starting Days	Yasuhiro Takemoto	110m	Prequel film based on the second volume of the original light novel, High Speed!	
2016	Sound! Euphonium: The Movie – Welcome to the Kitauji High School Concert Band	Tatsuya Ishihara	103m	Compilation of the first season of Sound! Euphonium	
2016	A Silent Voice	Naoko Yamada	130m	Adaptation of the manga by Yoshitoki Ōima	
2017	Free! Timeless Medley: The Bond	Eisaku Kawanami	94m	Summary of the second season of Free! focused on Haruka	
2017	Free! Timeless Medley: The Promise	Eisaku Kawanami	99m	Summary of the second season of Free! focused on Rin	
2017	Sound! Euphonium: The Movie – May the Melody Reach You!	Tatsuya Ishihara; Taichi Ogawa	105m	Compilation of the second season of Sound! Euphonium	
2017	Free! Take Your Marks	Eisaku Kawanami	105m	Continuation of Free!	
2018	Love, Chunibyo & Other Delusions! Take on Me	Tatsuya Ishihara	90m	Continuation of the second season of Love, Chunibyo & Other Delusions	
2018	Liz and the Blue Bird	Naoko Yamada	90m	Spin-off of Sound! Euphonium	
2019	Sound! Euphonium: The Movie – Our Promise: A Brand New Day	Tatsuya Ishihara	100m	Continuation of the second season of Sound! Euphonium	
2019	Free! -Road to the World- Dream	Eisaku Kawanami	99m	Summary of the third season of Free!	
2019	Violet Evergarden: Eternity and the Auto Memory Doll	Haruka Fujita	93m	Spin-off of Violet Evergarden	
2020	Violet Evergarden: The Movie	Taichi Ishidate	140m	Continuation of Violet Evergarden	
2021–2022	Free! The Final Stroke	Eisaku Kawanami	90m (1); 106m (2)	Two-part continuation of Free!	
2022	Tsurune: The Movie – The First Shot	Takuya Yamamura	102m	Compilation of the first season of Tsurune with new scenes	
2025	Miss Kobayashi's Dragon Maid: A Lonely Dragon Wants to Be Loved	Tatsuya Ishihara	105m	Continuation of the second season of Miss Kobayashi's Dragon Maid	
2026	Sound! Euphonium: The Final Movie	Tatsuya Ishihara; Taichi Ogawa	120m (1); 127m (2)	Two-part compilation of the third season of Sound! Euphonium	
2027	The Credits Roll into the Sea	Taichi Ishidate	TBA	Adaptation of the manga by John Tarachine	

=== Original video animations ===
Year	Title	Director(s)	Eps.	Note(s)
1991	Shiawasette Naani	Tatsuya Ishihara (Note: Chief Director (チーフディレクター))	1	Based on novels by Ryuho Okawa (Note: Despite the Production Assistance credit, Gakken (a publishing company) is the only company credited with a higher credit (製作; Production), indicating KyoAni's involvement as the OVA's animation studio.)
2002	Nurse Witch Komugi	Yasuhiro Takemoto; Yoshitomo Yonetani	5.5	Parody of both The SoulTaker and the magical girl anime genre. Co-produced with Tatsunoko Production
2003	Munto	Yoshiji Kigami	1	Original work
2005	Munto 2: Beyond the Walls of Time	Yoshiji Kigami	1	Sequel to Munto
2008	Lucky Star: Original na Visual to Animation	Yasuhiro Takemoto	1	Side story to Lucky Star
2011	Nichijou: Nichijou no 0-wa	Tatsuya Ishihara	1	Side story to Nichijou
2013	Hyōka: Motsubeki Mono wa	Yasuhiro Takemoto	1	Side story to Hyōka
2017	Baja no Studio	Yoshiji Kigami	1	Original work
2020	Baja no Studio: Baja no Mita Umi	Yoshiji Kigami	1	Sequel to Baja no Studio
2023	Sound! Euphonium: Ensemble Contest	Tatsuya Ishihara	1	Side story to Sound! Euphonium

=== Original net animations ===
Year	Title	Director(s)	Eps.	Note(s)	Refs.
2009	The Melancholy of Haruhi-chan Suzumiya	Yasuhiro Takemoto	25	Adaptation of the spin-off Haruhi Suzumiya manga by Puyo	
2009	Nyorōn Churuya-san	Yasuhiro Takemoto	13	Adaptation of the spin-off Haruhi Suzumiya manga by Eretto	

== Published light novels ==
- Yūyake Tōdai no Himitsu (2011)
- Love, Chunibyo & Other Delusions (2011–2017)
- Oyashiki to Coppelia (2011)
- Beyond the Boundary (2012–2013)
- Tamako Market (2013–2014)
- Myriad Colors Phantom World (2013–2016)
- High Speed! (2013–2014)
- Robot Heart Update (2015–2017)
- Violet Evergarden (2015–2020)
- Manzai Senka! (2016)
- Tsurune (2016–present)
- Kono Hoshizora ni wa Kimi ga Tarinai! (2017)
- Sparks of Tomorrow (2018)
- Mobomoga (2020)
- Jikan (2020)
- Ten'yaku-ryō no Majo (2020)
- Sakura no Furu Machi (2020)
- Umihime Mare (2022)

== International distribution ==
A number of titles that are produced by Kyoto Animation are distributed in North America such as Crunchyroll LLC (Funimation), ADV Films, Sentai Filmworks, Central Park Media, Netflix and Bandai Entertainment. Kanon and Air were originally licensed by ADV Films but the licenses were transferred to Funimation in 2008; whilist Bandai Entertainment previously distributed KyoAni titles such as The Melancholy of Haruhi Suzumiya, Lucky Star, K-On! and Nichijou. However, Bandai Entertainment closed in 2013, and three of the four of its titles were transferred to Funimation while K-On! was moved to Sentai Filmworks where it dubbed the second season and a movie.

In Australia, where Crunchyroll Store Australia (previously known as Madman Anime) is based, they licensed a handful of KyoAni titles such as Clannad, Hyouka and Love, Chunibyo & Other Delusions.
