= Free! =

Japanese anime television series

- Promotional poster of the Free! anime series
- Genre: Sports (Swimming)
- Anime television series

Free! - Iwatobi Swim Club
- Directed by: Hiroko Utsumi
- Produced by: Shinichiro Hatta; Shinichi Nakamura; Shigeru Saito; Masayuki Nishide
- Written by: Masahiro Yokotani
- Music by: Tatsuya Kato
- Studio: Kyoto Animation; Animation Do
- Licensed by: Crunchyroll; UK: Anime Limited
- Original network: Tokyo MX, TVA, ABC, BS11, AT-X
- Original run: July 4, 2013 – September 26, 2013
- Episodes: 12
- Light novel

High Speed!
- Written by: Kōji Ōji
- Illustrated by: Futoshi Nishiya
- Published by: Kyoto Animation
- Imprint: KA Esuma Bunko
- Original run: July 8, 2013 – July 2, 2014
- Volumes: 2
- Anime television series

Free! - Eternal Summer
- Directed by: Hiroko Utsumi
- Produced by: Shinichiro Hatta; Shinichi Nakamura; Shigeru Saito; Masayuki Nishide
- Written by: Masahiro Yokotani
- Music by: Tatsuya Kato
- Studio: Kyoto Animation; Animation Do
- Licensed by: AUS: Madman Entertainment; NA: Funimation; UK: Anime Limited
- Original network: Tokyo MX, TVA, ABC, BS11, AT-X, NHK G Tottori
- Original run: July 2, 2014 – September 24, 2014
- Episodes: 13 + OVA
- Anime television series

Free! - Dive to the Future
- Directed by: Eisaku Kawanami
- Written by: Masahiro Yokotani
- Music by: Tatsuya Kato
- Studio: Kyoto Animation; Animation Do
- Licensed by: NA: Funimation
- Original network: ABC, Tokyo MX, TVA, BS11, AT-X
- Original run: July 11, 2018 – September 26, 2018
- Episodes: 12
- Films
- High Speed! Free! Starting Days; Free! Timeless Medley; Free! Take Your Marks; Free! Road to the World - the Dream; Free! The Final Stroke

Free! is a Japanese anime television series produced by Kyoto Animation and Animation Do. The series is loosely based on the light novel, High Speed! (Japanese: ハイ☆スピード!, Hepburn: Hai Supīdo!), written by Kōji Ōji, which received an honorable mention in the second Kyoto Animation Award contest in 2011 and was published in July 2013. The first season titled, Free! - Iwatobi Swim Club for international distribution, aired in Japan in 2013; and the second season titled, Free! - Eternal Summer, aired in 2014. A third season of the anime series titled, Free! - Dive to the Future, aired in 2018. Hiroko Utsumi directed the first two seasons, while season three was directed by Eisaku Kawanami.

Prior to season three, several films depict events preceding, including and following the events of seasons one and two. The first feature film, High Speed! Free! Starting Days, was released in December 2015 and depicts events from volume two of the series' prequel light novel, High Speed! A film trilogy was released in 2017 with the first two films being compilations of seasons one and two of the anime series titled, Free! Timeless Medley - the Bond and Free! Timeless Medley - the Promise. The third film in the trilogy titled, Free! Take Your Marks, features four new vignettes. A compilation film encompassing the third season titled, Free! Road to the World - the Dream, debuted in July 2019.

The next installment of the franchise was slated for release alongside the Tokyo 2020 Summer Olympics, but both were postponed until 2021. A final film duology titled, Free! The Final Stroke, debuted in Japanese theaters in two parts: Part 1 in September 2021 and Part 2 in April 2022.

== Plot ==
Free is set in the town of Iwatobi, Japan, which is based on Iwami, Tottori. The story is centered on high school student Haruka Nanase, a gifted swimmer. After encountering his childhood rival, Rin Matsuoka from Samezuka Academy, he and his friends revitalize Iwatobi High School's swim team. In addition to his childhood friends, Makoto Tachibana and Nagisa Hazuki, Rei Ryugazaki is recruited onto the team. While the team trains for tournaments, Haruka and Rin's rivalry continues to sour from Rin facing setbacks in improvement, though his desire to swim competitively escalates. However, during the prefectural tournament, Iwatobi's swim team reminds Rin of their friendship through a medley relay. Despite being disqualified, the boys' relationships with one another improve.

In Free! Eternal Summer, Haruka, now in his final year in high school, has not decided on what to do after graduating. Meanwhile, Rin's childhood friend, Sosuke Yamazaki, transfers to Samezuka Academy. Rin hopes to swim competitively with Sosuke but, unbeknownst to him, Sosuke has injured his shoulder from overuse. During the regionals, Haruka becomes overwhelmed from the pressure of performing in front of scouts and becomes lost on what to do for the future. He further learns that his best friend, Makoto Tachibana, is leaving Iwatobi to attend university in Tokyo. Haruka withdraws from all social contact. However, with help from his friends and a trip to Sydney, Australia, where he visits the International Aquatic Centre, he decides to continue his swimming career and compete on the college level.

In Free! Dive to the Future, Haruka attends Hidaka University and reconnects with his friends from junior high school, with the exception of Ikuya Kirishima, who is still bitter about their former team breaking up without explanation. In order to make amends with Ikuya, Haruka begins training in other strokes besides freestyle and eventually competes in an Individual Medley alongside him. Although they mend their friendship, Haruka is faced with the reality that he will be competing against swimmers at his level and higher. Despite this, he commits to continuing his swimming career and to competing on the global level.

In Free! The Final Stroke (the first volume), Haruka, Rin, Ikuya and others make the Japan National Swim Team and compete at the global level in qualifying events and at the Fukuoka Tournament. In Free! The Final Stroke (the second volume), Haruka, Rin, Ikuya and Sosuke compete in a medley race, win gold medals, and become national champions.

== Characters ==
=== Iwatobi High School ===
Haruka Nanase (七瀬 遙, Nanase Haruka)
Voiced by: Nobunaga Shimazaki (Japanese); Todd Haberkorn (English)
(Child) Voiced by: Megumi Matsumoto (Japanese); Lara Woodhull (English)
Haruka specializes in freestyle. His swimming style captivates others, and he idolizes water. He is a strong, quiet person who displays limited facial expressions and has a hard time communicating his feelings. Due to his feminine name, he asks to be called Haru (ハル). Haruka lives with his grandmother until she dies, while his parents live and work in Hokkaido, then alone. He initially quits competitive swimming after a falling out with Rin, but he regains his passion upon Rin's return to Japan and rediscovering the joy of teamwork with his friends. In Eternal Summer, Haruka faces uncertainty about making future plans, but with support from his friends, he realizes he wants to swim competitively at a higher level. In Dive to the Future, he continues developing as a competitive swimmer at Hidaka University, competing in the All-Japan Invitational and committing to success in global competition. In Final Stroke, Haruka realizes his dream of becoming a world-class swimmer and competes in his first global competition, after which he continues to compete at the global level.
Makoto Tachibana (橘 真琴, Tachibana Makoto)
Voiced by: Tatsuhisa Suzuki (Japanese); Johnny Yong Bosch (English)
(Child) Voiced by: Satsuki Yukino (Japanese); Colleen Clinkenbeard (English)
Makoto specializes in backstroke. He is Haruka's classmate and best friend since childhood. Unlike Haruka, he is outgoing and often speaks up for him, understanding his behaviors and knowing him extremely well. He is also sensitive and scares easily. He develops thalassophobia due to a traumatic childhood incident in which an old fisherman, whom Makoto idolized, drowns in a typhoon. In Eternal Summer, he becomes a part-time swim coach at Iwatobi SC Returns and decides to pursue the role professionally. In Dive to the Future, Makoto revises his goal of teaching children how to swim to training professional swimmers, including Haruka and Rin. In Final Stroke, Makoto commits to becoming a professional trainer and begins working with a number of the swimmers introduced in the series' prior media.
Nagisa Hazuki (葉月 渚, Hazuki Nagisa)
Voiced by: Tsubasa Yonaga (Japanese); Greg Ayres (English)
(Child) Voiced by: Satomi Sato
Nagisa specializes in breaststroke. He is cheerful, spirited and outspoken. He has admired Haruka's swimming since elementary school and enrolls at Iwatobi High School hoping to swim with him again. When he learns that the school's former team no longer exists, he initiates its reorganization. In Dive to the Future, he continues to be a vital member of the Iwatobi High School Swimming Club after Haruka and Makoto graduate. In Final Stroke, Nagisa graduates high school and enters Naribusawa University, becoming Kaede's kouhai and mentoring him.
Rei Ryugazaki (竜ヶ崎 怜, Ryūgazaki Rei)
Voiced by: Daisuke Hirakawa (Japanese); J. Michael Tatum (English)
(Child) Voiced by: Yōko Hikasa
Rei specializes in the butterfly. He is logical and intelligent, but easily manipulated by his classmate, Nagisa. He is attracted to all things beautiful and will do everything in his power to avoid things he claims "unattractive." He used to be on the track team as a pole vaulter, but could not perform well because he constantly over-analyzed his jumps. He initially refuses to join the swim club because he finds swimming inelegant, but he eventually joins after seeing Haruka's swimming. In Dive to the Future, he is the captain of the Iwatobi school team after Makoto graduates. In Final Stroke, Rei graduates high school and enters Shimogami University.
Romio Hayafune (早船 ロミオ, Hayafune Romio)
Voiced by: Atsushi Abe (Japanese); Parker Gray (English)
Romio is a first-year student at Iwatobi High School and free-style swimmer who joins the Iwatobi High School Swim Club after Haruka and Makoto leave for university. Born in the US, he lives in Tokyo before coming to Iwatobi. During middle school, he experiences a false start resulting in major anxiety but, with the help of his high school teammates, is able to overcome his fears and continues to develop as a competitive swimmer. In Final Stroke, Romio is seen as a continuing member of the Iwatobi High School Swim Club.
Shizuru Isurugi (石動 静流, Isurugi Shizuru)
Voiced by: Yoshitsugu Matsuoka (Japanese); Alejandro Saab (English)
Shizuru is a first-year student at Iwatobi High School and a new member of the Iwatobi High School Swim Club following the departure of Haruka and Makoto. He is an excellent swimmer, but generally of a dour disposition who suffers from motion sickness. In Final Stroke, Shizuru is seen as a continuing member of the Iwatobi High School Swim Club.

=== Samezuka Academy ===
Rin Matsuoka (松岡 凛, Matsuoka Rin)
Voiced by: Mamoru Miyano (Japanese); Vic Mignogna (S1-S3; films), Austin Tindle (S3 OVA) (English)
(Child) Voiced by: Akeno Watanabe (Japanese); Maxey Whitehead (English)
Rin specializes in butterfly and freestyle. After transferring to Iwatobi Elementary School, he ends up in the same local swim club as Haruka, Makoto and Nagisa, eventually leading them to victory in a medley relay. Rin then goes to Australia to study and train, returning to Japan and enrolling at Samezuka Academy as a second-year, but only joining their swim team after a reunion race against Haruka, who he now views as his rival. In Eternal Summer, Rin becomes Samezuka's swim team captain. In Dive to the Future, Rin trains in Australia but returns to Japan to compete in the All-Japan Invitational. In Final Stroke, Rin realizes his dream of becoming a world-class swimmer and competes in his first global competition, after which he continues to compete at the global level.
Sosuke Yamazaki (山崎 宗介, Yamazaki Sōsuke)
Voiced by: Yoshimasa Hosoya (Japanese); Ian Sinclair (English)
(Child) Voiced by: Aoi Yūki
Sosuke is Rin's childhood friend who specializes in butterfly. In Eternal Summer, he tells Rin that he has transferred to Samezuka Academy in order to swim his last year of high school in his hometown. The truth is that over-training in his first year of high school has severely injured his shoulder, ruining his chances of entering the professional world. Sosuke dislikes Haruka but tolerates his ability to motivate Rin. In Dive to the Future, Sosuke's shoulder surgery is seen to be successful. In Final Stroke, Sosuke continues rehabilitation and re-enters competitive swimming.
Aiichiro Nitori (似鳥 愛一郎, Nitori Aiichirō)
Voiced by: Kōki Miyata (Japanese); Jessie James Grelle (Note: Credited as Josh Grelle; Grelle came out as transgender and changed their name in 2023.) (English)
Aiichiro is a member of the Samezuka Academy swim team. He swims long distance freestyle, but also breaststroke in the second season. With coaching from Sosuke, Aiichiro's swimming improves to the point that Rin allows him to compete in relay. He is eventually appointed as Samezuka's new captain. In Final Stroke, he graduates from high school and enters Shimogami University.
Seijuro Mikoshiba (御子柴 清十郎, Mikoshiba Seijūrō)
Voiced by: Kenjiro Tsuda (Japanese); Robert McCollum (English)
Seijuro is a former captain of the Samezuka Academy swim team. He is an enthusiastic person and a skilled swimmer. He shows strong interest in Gou Matsuoka. In Dive to the Future, he attends Hidaka University and is a third-year swim team member. He is seen again as a character in Final Stroke.
Momotaro Mikoshiba (御子柴 百太郎, Mikoshiba Momotarō)
Voiced by: Kenichi Suzumura (Japanese); Jerry Jewell (English)
Momotaro is Seijuro's younger brother and a student at Samezuka Academy. Initially he does not join the swim team, but does so later on at Rin's insistence. Like his brother, he is an enthusiastic person with an interest in Gou. He is a skilled backstroke swimmer with the given nickname, "The Sea of Japan's Sea Otter." In Final Stroke, he is seen to be the captain of the Samezuka Academy swim team.

=== Iwatobi Junior High School/Tokyo ===
Asahi Shiina (椎名 旭, Shiina Asahi)
Voiced by: Toshiyuki Toyonaga (Japanese); Christopher Llewyn Ramirez (English)
Along with Haruka and Makoto, Asahi is a member of Iwatobi Junior High School's swim team, specializing in butterfly. After his first year, he moves to Kyushu and becomes the captain of Kazami High School's swim team. In Dive to the Future, he comes to Tokyo as a freshman at Hidaka University, where he joins their swim team with Haruka.
Ikuya Kirishima (桐嶋 郁弥, Kirishima Ikuya)
Voiced by: Kouki Uchiyama (Japanese); Lee George (English)
Ikuya is a member of the Iwatobi Junior High School's swim team with Haruka, Makoto and Asahi, specializing in breaststroke. He also possesses an elegant crawl, similar in speed and style to Haruka's. After his junior high team breaks up, he follows his older brother, Natsuya, to America where he attends high school, focusing on developing all four swim strokes in order to become an Individual Medley competitor. In Dive to the Future, he attends Shimogami University, where he joins their swim team. Though his personal struggles affect his swimming and his friendships, they are later resolved with help from Haruka. In Final Stroke, Ikuya realizes his dream of becoming a world-class swimmer and competes in his first global competition.
Hiyori Tono (遠野 日和, Tōno Hiyori)
Voiced by: Ryōhei Kimura (Japanese); Jason Liebrecht (English)
Hiyori is a first-year student at Shimogami University and specializes in backstroke. He is Ikuya's friend and top supporter. Natsuya tasks Hiyori with watching over Ikuya while he travels, a role which overburdens Hiyori and strains his friendship with Ikuya. Their bond is restored during the College Championships. In Final Stroke, his friendship with Ikuya is seen to endure and he is on better terms with the other characters of the series.
Kisumi Shigino (鴫野 貴澄, Shigino Kisumi)
Voiced by: Chihiro Suzuki (Japanese); Eric Vale (English)
(Child) Voiced by: Rina Satō (Japanese); Tia Ballard (English)
Kisumi is classmates with the members of the Iwatobi Junior High School's swim team and a member of the basketball team. Although they ultimately attend different high schools, Kisumi works with Makoto to help his younger brother, Hayato, learn to swim. In Dive to the Future, Kisumi attends Hidaka University along with Haruka and Asahi, while working part-time at his uncle's real estate agency. In Final Stroke, Kisumi remains a top supporter of those who continue to swim at the university level.
Natsuya Kirishima (桐嶋 夏也, Kirishima Natsuya)
Voiced by: Kenji Nojima (Japanese); Ricco Fajardo (English)
Natsuya is Ikuya's older brother. He was the captain of the Iwatobi Junior High School Swim team while Ikuya was in attendance. The brothers have a strained relationship until they come to terms. After high school, Natsuya swims competitively, but independently, entering contests and winning prize money around the world. He eventually returns to Japan to look after Ikuya and compete alongside him. In Final Stroke, he is seen mentoring some of the previously introduced swimmers of the series.
Nao Serizawa (芹沢 尚, Serizawa Nao)
Voiced by: Satoshi Hino (Japanese); Oscar Seung (English)
Nao is Natsuya Kirishima's classmate, friend and a member of the Iwatobi Junior High School Swim team who was temporarily sidelined by an eye injury. He attends university in Tokyo and is instrumental in guiding Makoto towards his new career path. In Final Stroke, Nao is continuing his university studies while working with several of the previous swimmers of the series.

=== Others ===
Gou Matsuoka (松岡 江, Matsuoka Gō)
Voiced by: Akeno Watanabe (Japanese); Jamie Marchi (English)
Gou is Rin's younger sister. She is a student at Iwatobi High School. She joins the swim club as their Manager in hopes that they can restore Rin's old personality. Gou is fascinated with muscles. She remains an active member of the Iwatobi Swim Club throughout the series. In Final Stroke, she expresses the idea that she, too, has a dream to fulfill, although it is unspecified in volume one.
Ayumu Kunikida (国木田 歩, Kunikida Ayumu)
Voiced by: Ryo Hirohashi (Japanese); Apphia Yu (English)
Ayumu is a soft-spoken girl who joins the Iwatobi High School Swim Club in order to train as its next manager, following Gou Matsuoka's graduation. Unlike Gou, however, she prefers boys who are not muscular but who are, instead, a bit corpulent. She is seen again as a character in Final Stroke.
Miho Amakata (天方 美帆, Amakata Miho)
Voiced by: Satsuki Yukino (Japanese); Caitlin Glass (English)
Miho is Haruka and Makoto's homeroom teacher and teaches classical literature. The students nickname her "Miss A" (天ちゃん, Ama-chan) and she becomes the faculty advisor to the school's swim club. Miho used to be a gravure model under the name Marin Nishikujo (西九条まりん, Nishikujō Marin), which she takes extreme measures to hide. In Dive to the Future, she continues as advisor to the Iwatobi Swim Club and supporter of the university-level swimmers.
Goro Sasabe (笹部 吾朗, Sasabe Gorō)
Voiced by: Hiroshi Yanaka (Japanese); Christopher R. Sabat (English)
An alumnus of Iwatobi High School and the Iwatobi High School Swim Club, Coach Sasabe (as he is best known), works as a swimming coach at the community-based Iwatobi Swimming Club while Haruka, Makoto, Nagisa and Rin are in elementary school. After the building is abandoned, he becomes a pizza deliveryperson. He begins re-coaching Haruka, Makoto and Nagisa, with the addition of Rei, when they re-establish their school-based swim club, and he sees their enthusiasm. In Eternal Summer, he rebuilds the Iwatobi Swimming Club, renaming it "Iwatobi SC Returns" and developing the space into a community recreation center and swim school. In Dive to the Future, he continues running the center and coaching the Iwatobi High School Swim Club. He continues to support the university-level swimmers.
Ryuji Azuma (東 龍司, Azuma Ryuji)
Voiced by: Takeshi Kusao (Japanese); Brandon Potter (English)
An alumnus of Iwatobi High School and the Iwatobi High School Swim Club, he is a former top competitive swimmer who currently coaches Haruka Nanase. Ryuji was on a path to greatness when an event caused him to lose his competitive edge. He is respected by Haruka and accepted by Makoto, who Ryuji encourages working with professional athletes after observing how well he handles Haruka's stubborn nature. In Final Stroke, Ryuji is seen to continue as Haruka's coach.
Mikhail Makarovich Nitori (ミハイル, Mihairu)
Voiced by: Hidenobu Kiuchi (Japanese); Phil Parsons (English)
Mikhail is Nitori's uncle on his mother's side of the family, a former Russian competitive swimmer and long-time rival of Ryuji Azuma. He currently coaches Rin Matsuoka in Australia. He assesses whether he will coach a swimmer by their musculature, being someone who admires muscles, in general. In Final Stroke, Mikhail is seen to continue as Rin's coach.
Isuzu Mikoshiba (御子柴 五十鈴, Mikoshiba Isuzu)
Voiced by: Rina Sato (Japanese); Mikaela Krantz (English)
Isuzu is Seijuro and Momotaro Mikoshiba's sister. She is captain of the Hidaka University High School Swim Team. Upon meeting Haruka Nanase, she expresses her admiration and her wish to compete against him. Upon meeting Gou Matsuoka, the two immediately bond as muscle-obsessed fangirls. She is seen again as a character in Final Stroke.
Albert Volandel (アルベルト ヴォーランデル, Aruberuto Vōranderu)
Voiced by: Jeff Manning (Japanese); Daman Mills (English)
Albert is a Swedish swimmer who holds the world's record in both 100-meter and 200-meter races in freestyle, also known as the front crawl. Haruka meets Albert at a special training camp without realizing who he is, and they establish a friendly rapport. It is not until an informal group competition that he learns of Albert's identity with said swimmer easily winning and Haruka coming in a distant second place. In Final Stroke, Albert continues to dominate the freestyle field, but suddenly withdraws without explanation from a critical competition, thus giving the other swimmers a better chance at winning medals.
Kaede Kinjou (金城 楓, Kinjō Kaede)
Voiced by: Daisuke Ono
(Child) Voiced by: Sachi Kokuryu
Kaede is a student at Naribusawa University and their top ace swimmer. He is considered to have the best chance of beating Japan's freestyle record. In Final Stroke, Kaede realizes his ambition of becoming a world-class swimmer and competes in his first global competition, winning a bronze medal in the process, but unhappy with the result.

== Media ==
=== Anime series ===
Animation Do released a splash image for a new project in April 2012, which was followed by a television commercial for the project in March 2013. The commercial quickly went viral. Kyoto Animation announced an animated series during a live stream on Niconico on April 26, 2013. The 12-episode anime television series, produced in collaboration with Animation Do, was directed by Hiroko Utsumi, written by Masahiro Yokotani, and featured character designs by Futoshi Nishiya and music by Tatsuya Katō. The series aired in Japan between July 4 and September 26, 2013, on Tokyo MX, and was also streamed on the Japanese video-sharing website Niconico and simulcast by Crunchyroll, who also possesses the home video rights to the series. The series was released on six BD and DVD compilation volumes between September 11, 2013, and February 5, 2014, with certain volumes containing short bonus episodes.

A 13-episode second season, titled Free! Eternal Summer, aired between July 2 and September 24, 2014. Funimation has licensed the second season for streaming and home video in North America, and they attempted to negotiate with Crunchyroll about releasing the first season on home video. However, Discotek Media released the first season on behalf of Crunchyroll on DVD with English subtitles, but noted a dubbed release might come eventually. The English dub of the first season is available on Crunchyroll, with the English voice cast reprising their roles. Crunchyroll and Funimation released the first season on Blu-ray and DVD on May 9, 2017, with an English dub. Madman Entertainment will import Funimation's release into Australia and New Zealand.

A 12-episode third season titled Free! Dive to the Future aired between July 11 and September 26, 2018. Eisaku Kawanami returned to direct the third season, while all the staff and cast reprised their roles.

=== Films ===
An animated film based on the second volume of the original light novel, titled High Speed! Free! Starting Days, was released in Japan on December 5, 2015. The film was directed by Yasuhiro Takemoto and the screenplay was written by Maiko Nishioka. Yokotani worked on the story composition, and Nishiya served as character designer and chief animation director.

An animated film trilogy was announced by Kyoto Animation. The first two, titled Free! Timeless Medley: The Bond and Free! Timeless Medley: The Promise are compilations of the second season, Free! Eternal Summer with new scenes added. The Bond focuses on the five main members of the Iwatobi Swim Club, while The Promise focuses on Rin and Sousuke from the Samezuka Swim Club. Both films opened on April 22 and July 1, 2017, respectively. A third film, titled Free! Take Your Marks, is a new story taking place in the spring as Haruka deals with high school graduation and everyone's futures as they move forward in their lives and was released on October 28, 2017. All three films were directed by Eisaku Kawanami, and much of the staff from the anime series and High Speed! film returned for the compilation films, including series composer Masahiro Yokotani, character designer Futoshi Nishiya and composer Tatsuya Katō. Funimation acquired the film trilogy and the High Speed prequel film for home video release as well as screening the Take Your Marks film in US theaters on March 14, 2018, presented in Japanese with English subtitles.

After the third season's finale, a new animated project slated for a 2020 release was announced. The new project was revealed to be two additional films. A compilation film for the third season titled Free! Road to the World - the Dream was released on July 5, 2019, with the staff and cast from the third season reprising their roles.

Another brand-new film was set to be released in Q3 2020, but was delayed to a further release date. An information event previewing the trailer for that film project was originally supposed to take place on July 19, 2019, but it was cancelled in the wake of the Kyoto Animation arson attack. On August 15, 2020, Kyoto Animation revealed that the new film will premiere in 2021. Titled Free! The Final Stroke, the film is split into two parts, with the first part premiering on September 17, 2021, and the second on April 22, 2022. Eisaku Kawanami returned as director for the films. The first part earned around 543,136,940 yen (about US$4.75 million). The second part earned over 910 million yen (about US$6.69 million) and sold about 625,000 tickets after 11 weeks in theaters.

=== Music ===
For the first season, the opening theme is "Rage On" by Oldcodex and the ending theme is "Splash Free" by Style Five (Nobunaga Shimazaki, Tatsuhisa Suzuki, Mamoru Miyano, Tsubasa Yonaga and Daisuke Hirakawa). The ending theme for episode 12 is "Ever Blue" by Style Five. The single for "Rage On" was released on July 17, 2013, and sold over 24,281 copies. The single for "Splash Free" was released on August 7, 2013, and sold over 47,646 copies. For the second season, the opening theme is "Dried Up Youthful Fame" by Oldcodex, and the ending theme is "Future Fish" by Style Five. The ending theme for episode 13 is "Clear Blue Departure" by Nobunaga Shimazaki, Tatsuhisa Suzuki, Tsubasa Yonaga, Daisuke Hirakawa, Mamoru Miyano, Yoshimasa Hosoya, Kōki Miyata and Kenichi Suzumura. For the third season, the opening theme is "Heading to Over" by Oldcodex and the ending theme is "Gold Evolution" by Style Five.

Five character song singles were released sung by the voice actors of the main characters. The singles for Haruka Nanase (sung by Shimazaki) and Makoto Tachibana (sung by Suzuki) were released on August 7, 2013. Makoto's single sold over 23,487 copies, while Haruka's single sold about 20,371 copies. The singles for Rin Matsuoka (sung by Miyano), Nagisa Hazuki (sung by Yonaga) and Rei Ryūgazaki (sung by Hirakawa) were released on September 4, 2013. Rin's single sold over 18,698 copies, while Rei's and Nagisa's sold over 15,021 and 14,283 copies, respectively.

Four duet character song singles were released sung by the voice actors of the main characters. The single with Haruka (sung by Shimazaki) and Makoto (sung by Suzuki) was released on December 18, 2013, and sold over 16,361 album copies. The single with Nagisa (sung by Tsubasa Yonaga) and Rei (sung by Daisuke Hirakawa) was released on January 15, 2014, and sold over 11,980 copies. The single with Rei (sung by Daisuke Hirakawa) and Rin (sung by Mamoru Miyano) was released on February 12, 2014, and sold over 13,389 copies. The last single with Haruka (sung by Shimazaki) and Rin (sung by Mamoru Miyano) was released on March 19, 2014, and sold over 15,866 album copies.

=== Other ===
The original light novel High Speed! (ハイ☆スピード, Hai Supīdo) is written by Kōji Ōji, with illustrations by Futoshi Nishiya. Ōji entered it into the second Kyoto Animation Award contest in 2011, and it won an honorable mention in the novel category. It was published by Kyoto Animation on July 8, 2013. A second volume was published on July 2, 2014, and the story takes place when Haruka and Makoto are in middle school.

An Internet radio show to promote the anime called Iwatobi Channel (イワトビちゃんねる, Iwatobi Channeru) began broadcasting on June 17, 2013. The show is streamed online every Monday, and is produced by the Japanese Internet radio stations Lantis Web Radio and Onsen. The show is hosted by Nobunaga Shimazaki and Tatsuhisa Suzuki, who voice Haruka Nanase and Makoto Tachibana from the anime, respectively. Two CD compilation volumes were released between August 21 and September 25, 2013.

Two volumes in a drama CDs series, titled Iwatobi High School Swimming Club Activity Journal (岩鳶高校水泳部活動日誌, Iwatobi Kōkō Suiei-bu Katsudō Nisshi), were released between August 21 and September 25, 2013.
