= Servamp: Alice in the Garden =

- The film's theatrical release poster.
- Kanji: 劇場版「SERVAMP」-Alice in the Garden-
- Revised Hepburn: Gekijōban "Sāvanpu" -Alice in the Garden-
- Directed by: Hideaki Nakano
- Written by: Ayumu Hisao
- Based on: Servamp by Strike Tanaka
- Production company: Platinum Vision
- Release date: April 7, 2018 (Japan)
- Running time: 58 minutes
- Country: Japan
- Language: Japanese

Servamp: Alice in the Garden (Japanese: 劇場版「SERVAMP」-Alice in the Garden-, Hepburn: Gekijōban "Sāvanpu" -Alice in the Garden-) is a Japanese anime film based on the manga series Servamp by Strike Tanaka. The film is directed by Hideaki Nakano and animated by Platinum Vision. It premiered in Japan on April 7, 2018.

== Plot ==
After Tsubaki's disappearance, snow begins to fall even though it's in the middle of summer. Mahiru suspects that the falling snow is related to vampires. He confides to Misono, proposing they hold a meeting together with the rest of their Eves and Servamps. Misono declines as his father has forbid him to get out for the time being, but promises that he'll sneak out. During his attempt to sneak out through the back gate, Misono slightly remembers his memories, prompting Lily to immediately manipulate Misono's memories, making Misono not even remembering his phone call with Mahiru nor ever trying to sneak out.

The next day, Mahiru, Kuro, and the others are gathering at Tetsu's hot spring inn. They are visited by Mikuni and Jeje, who reveals that the weather phenomenon is caused by the influence of Jinns, beings that comes out from a Servamp's body in a form of fine dust when their contract item is broken. In this case, the Jinns came out from Lawless' body when Tsubaki broke his contract item. Mikuni directs Mahiru and the others to his house, the Alicein Mansion, as something strange is happening there.

Upon entering the house, they are welcomed by Misono and Mikuni's father, Mikado Alicein. When inquired about Mikuni, everyone in the house deny of ever knowing Mikuni, acting like he doesn't exist. Since Mahiru refuses to leave until they meet Misono, Mikado and the servants threatens them to leave by force. Mikado explains that he won't let Misono fight, believing that Misono doesn't have the resolve and power to do so. He then locks Mahiru and his friends inside a warehouse.

At night, Misono is lured into the dining room by a puppet that looks like Lily. Misono learns that Lily has manipulated his memories, causing Misono to become enraged and unable to trust him. The puppeteer, Tsubaki's subclass, Otogiri, turns out to be the one who lured Misono and attacks Lily. While the Alicein servants fight her, Lily tries to explain himself to Misono but Misono refused to listen, severing the bond between him and Lily allowing Otogiri to destroy Lily's contract item, causing a mass amount of Jinn to come out from Lily's body. At the same time, Mahiru and the others manage to get out from the warehouse.

Lily goes berserk and devours Misono into his body, followed by Mahiru, Kuro, Lawless, and Licht, while Tetsu and Hugh holds Lily's body to prevent him from destroying the mansion. Inside Lily's inner world, they are attacked by the manifestation of Mikuni and Jeje conjured by Lily to prevent them from discovering his secret. In other part of the inner world, Misono sees Lily's memories and discovers that Misono, is in fact, an illegitimate child born from his father's affair with a tutor who worked for the Alicein house years ago. When Misono was still a baby, Mikuni's mother killed his mother out of jealousy. She tried her best to raise and love Misono as her own son since he is innocent, but 7 years before the story she eventually succumbs to her lingering jealousy and tried to kill him. To protect Misono, Mikuni killed his own mother and left the Alicein house. The incident severely traumatised Misono, leading Lily to erase the memory of the murder and Mikado covered it as a case of burglary.

Misono is disheartened by the revelation, believing his birth brought misfortune to his family. However, he then reads letters sent by his birth mother to his father that tells how she was happy having Misono in her life. This creates an opening for Mahiru and Kuro to defeat the manifestation of Mikuni and Jeje, returning them to the real world. Meanwhile, Misono confronts Lily in the core of his mind, assuring him that he won't reject him even after knowing the truth. Lily and Misono's bond is stabilized and they both returns to normal.

The next day, Misono tells his father that he'll fight together with his friends. Realising his son has matured, Mikado gives Misono his permission and requests if he meet Mikuni, to tell him to come home.

== Cast ==
Character	Voice actor
Mahiru Shirota	Takuma Terashima
Sleepy Ash	Yūki Kaji
Misono Alicein	Hiro Shimono
Snow Lily	Kazuma Horie
Mikuni Alicein	Tetsuya Kakihara
Doubt Doubt	Kenjiro Tsuda
Otogiri	Atsumi Tanezaki
Mikado Alicein	Kazuya Ichijō
Eisuke Dodo	Kōji Takahashi
Mitsuki Usami	Ayaka Fukuhara
Mari	Sayaka Senbongi
Yuri	Ayaka Nanase
Mysterious Girl	Mai Nakahara

== Production ==
On October 13, 2017, Media Factory's Monthly Comic Gene magazine revealed that there would be a "big announcement" for Strike Tanaka's Servamp manga on November 15, an announcement which was later revealed to be an anime film adaptation. Most of the staff from the television anime adaptation returned to produce the film, with Hideaki Nakano directing the film at Platinum Vision and Junko Yamanaka designing the characters. Ayumu Hisao replaced Kenji Konuta as scriptwriter for the project. The cast of the television series also returned to reprise their roles alongside a number of new cast members. Oldcodex, who previously performed the opening theme song for the television series, returned to perform the film's theme song "One Side".

== Release ==
The film was released in Japan on April 7, 2018. In Japan, the film will be released on Blu-ray and DVD on October 24, 2018.
