= Servamp =

Japanese manga and anime series

- Cover of English Servamp volume one.

SERVAMP -サーヴァンプ- (Sāvanpu)
- Genre: Action; Comedy; Supernatural
- Manga
- Written by: Strike Tanaka
- Published by: Media Factory
- English publisher: NA: Seven Seas Entertainment
- Magazine: Monthly Comic Gene
- Original run: June 15, 2011 – December 13, 2024
- Volumes: 24
- Anime television series
- Directed by: Shigeyuki Miya (Note: Credited under the pseudonym Ittō Sara, and credited as Chief Director (総監督, Sō Kantoku).); Hideaki Nakano
- Written by: Kenji Konuta
- Music by: Kenji Kawai
- Studio: Brain's Base; Platinum Vision
- Licensed by: NA: Crunchyroll; SA/SEA: Muse Communication
- Original network: AT-X, Tokyo MX, Sun TV, Mētele, BS Nittele
- English network: SEA: Animax Asia
- Original run: July 5, 2016 – September 20, 2016
- Episodes: 12
- Anime film
- Servamp: Alice in the Garden (2018)

Servamp (Japanese: SERVAMP -サーヴァンプ-, Hepburn: Sāvanpu) is a Japanese manga series by Strike Tanaka, It was serialized in Media Factory's shōjo manga magazine Monthly Comic Gene since June 2011 to December 2024, with its chapters collected into twenty-four tankōbon volumes. The series is licensed in North America by Seven Seas Entertainment. An anime television adaptation began airing on July 5, 2016, and concluded on September 20, 2016, with 12 episodes.

== Plot ==
Mahiru Shirota is a normal high school student who likes simple things. One day, on his way back home, he finds a black cat and decides to take care of it, naming it Kuro. The next day, however, he is surprised to find out that the black cat is, in fact, one of the seven vampires that represent the Seven Deadly Sins. His name is Sleepy Ash, he represents Sloth, and he turns into a cat when exposed to sunlight. By giving Sleepy Ash a name and a cat bell, and then calling him by his given name, Mahiru accidentally forms a temporary contract with him. The contract is finalized once Sleepy Ash drinks his blood, making him Mahiru's vampire servant known as "Servamp" and Mahiru becomes his master called "Eve". Following this, Mahiru and Sleepy Ash, now Kuro, encounter Tsubaki, a vampire who claims to be the Servamp of Melancholy and the unknown eighth brother of the other Servamps. Tsubaki intends to wage an all-out war against his six brothers and Sister, while Mahiru decides to gather them to fight against Tsubaki and his group together.

== Characters ==
=== Eves ===
Mahiru Shirota (城田真昼, Shirota Mahiru)
Voiced by: Takuma Terashima (drama CD, anime) (Japanese); Clifford Chapin (English)
He's a freshman high school student who lost his mother to an accident at a young age. Having no father to take care of him, he was left in the care of his ever-busy uncle. As a result, Mahiru grew up mostly alone and has developed many talents for household chores. Mahiru's talent for housework has also extended into his school life where he often uses them for class projects and the like. After discovering Sleepy Ash as a black cat and eventually becoming his Eve, he obtains a Lead (essentially a conjured tool for Eves) in the form of a Broomstick. Kuro later notes in irony that it is what may represent him the most due to Mahiru's personality, and that it was the first thing he used to hit Kuro with when they met. His Lead later changes into a Spear, giving Mahiru more physical prowess. Mahiru's catchphrase is "Thinking simply, it's got to be me!"
Misono Alicein (有栖院 御園, Arisuin Misono)
Voiced by: Hiro Shimono (drama CD, anime) (Japanese); Christopher Bevins (English)
Lily's Eve, he's a high school student who is in the same year as Mahiru. Misono comes from a very wealthy family and unfortunately possesses a very weak physical composition, which causes him to be easily exhausted. He has a tendency to look down on others such as when he commanded Mahiru to work for him in stopping Tsubaki. It's possible that this may be due to a lack of social skills. He is a child born from the affair between his father and Mikuni's home tutor. Out of jealousy, his real mother was killed by his father's wife with Doubt Doubt's help. She spared Misono and decided to raise him as her own son. While growing up, he witnessed his older brother Mikuni kill their mother but could not remember it fully because his memory was altered by Lily. He resented his brother for leaving the house until he learns the truth. Misono's Lead is a chair which he often sits in to rest, and has so far shown creative uses for said chair in combat.
Mikuni Alicein (有栖院 御国, Arisuin Mikuni)
Voiced by: Tetsuya Kakihara (anime) (Japanese); Jessie James Grelle (English)
Jeje's Eve, he's Misono's older brother and an antique dealer. He puts on a childish personality, however his true personality is quite the opposite; he is cunning, shown to be quite manipulative and doesn't have a second thought killing Subclass. Misono resented him for killing their mother and for running away and taking Doubt Doubt with him. It is later revealed that Mikuni and Misono are actually half-brothers. Mikuni accepted the result of his father's affair but despised his father all the same. When Doubt Doubt's power took a toll on his mother's sanity, Mikuni killed her to keep her from killing Misono. Then he left home, taking Doubt Doubt with him. He is a former member of C3. During the battle at C3 headquarter, Mikuni is revealed to be working together with Tsubaki's group for yet unknown agenda. His Lead is a rope that takes the form of a noose, which he uses to strangle people to death. He is, so far, the only Eve to have a Lead that specialises in killing his opponents.
Tetsu Sendagaya (千駄ヶ谷 鉄, Sendagaya Tetsu)
Voiced by: Yūki Ono (drama CD, anime) (Japanese); Chris Rager (English)
Old Child's Eve, he's a junior high school student who works in an onsen. He tends to be very soft-spoken and simple-minded. Despite being a junior-high student, Tetsu has a tall and big stature, and people often mistake him for a college student. Tetsu doesn't seem to care at all that he's associated with vampires, shown by how he often carries around his Lead (in his case, a giant indestructible coffin) which he even uses to advertise for his family's Onsen, since he doesn't know how to get rid of it. His contract with Hugh has recently come under speculation as it was revealed that he is not the one who chose the name "Hugh", with a necessary part of the contract being that the Eve chooses the new name; and it is possible that Hugh has been working with Tsubaki, much to the shock of Tetsu.
Licht Jekylland Todoroki (リヒト・ジキルランド・轟, Rihito Jikirurando Todoroki)
Voiced by: Nobunaga Shimazaki (drama CD, anime) (Japanese); Aaron Dismuke (English)
Lawless's Eve, he's a world-known Austrian pianist. Licht's personality can only be described as bizarre; he seems to consider himself an Angel, and even strikes poses while wearing a white backpack with wings attached. It's rare to see him smile; he almost always scowls. Licht has a violent streak, often brutally attacking other vampires (which he labels "Demons"). Licht also has an intense hatred for Lawless in particular, who he often calls a "rotten hedgehog" and is prone to tormenting or attacking. Licht possesses two Leads: A pair of powerful boots which can slow the regeneration abilities of vampires he kicks with, and a Grand Piano which he can play various songs on, with often debilitating effects on those who listen to them.
Izuna Nobel (イズナ・ノーベル, Izuna・Nōberu)
An engineer for C3 who has become the new Eve for the Servamp of Wrath, The Mother, who she named "Freya". She is a childhood friend of Shuhei whom she nicknames "Loki". She joined C3 together with him after the death of his father to make sure his vengeance won't be fulfilled as she doesn't want him to become a murderer. Unlike Shuhei, Izuna believes that humans and vampires can coexist, preferring to settle things peacefully rather than by brute force. This make her regretting ever making weapons that have been used by C3 to kill countless vampires. During her contract with The Mother, their contract item is Izuna's hair.
Niccolo Carpediem (ニコロ カルペディエム, Nikoro Karupediemu)
The current Eve of World End, the Servamp of Gluttony, who he named "Ildio". Niccolo is the boss of the Carpediem mafia family, succeeding after his father. Despite his position as the boss, Niccolo is rather spineless and lacks self-confidence, easily getting scared or pressured by people around him, but is still trying his best to live up to his position as the boss of Carpediem family. He cares for his subordinates and his Servamp, and wouldn't stand quiet if somebody hurt them. He is constantly saddened by the fact that World End seemingly never cares for him and his previous Eves whose names he never bothered to remember.

=== Servamps ===
Sleepy Ash (スリーピーアッシュ, Surīpī Asshu)
Voiced by: Yūki Kaji (drama CD, anime) (Japanese); Chuck Huber (English)
The Servamp, or servant vampire, of Sloth. The name given to him by Mahiru as part of their Servamp contract is Kuro (クロ), due to the color of his cat form's fur. Kuro is the oldest of the eight Servamp siblings and, according to Mikuni, arguably the most powerful of them. This is contrary to Kuro's lazy personality, and he can often be found dozing off, playing video games, or eating junk food in Mahiru's apartment. So far, he is the only Servamp without any Subclass, because he doesn't know whether a person wants to live longer or not and has so decided to have none. Kuro's past is mired in mystery to Mahiru, as he is rarely ever willing to discuss it. The mere mention of his past was enough to make the usual lazy Kuro to become angered. It's revealed that Kuro had a falling out with Lawless because he decided to kill the one who made them vampires after receiving the request from C3. The reason for accepting the request is because he thinks that the world doesn't need "monsters" like them anymore. Following the request, Sleepy Ash killed his own creator, but this haunted Kuro who ended up regretting his action. The regret and grief made Kuro decide to not do anything unless someone tells him to, until Mahiru urges him to face his own mistake, which also significantly improves Kuro and Mahiru's friendship. Kuro has two animal forms: the first being his usual black cat form, and the second being a giant lion form. Kuro's primary weapons are a pair of deadly, razor-sharp claws that can easily skewer targets.
Tsubaki (椿)
Voiced by: Tatsuhisa Suzuki (drama CD, anime) (Japanese); Micah Solusod (English)
The vampire of Melancholy. This mysterious man introduces himself as the eighth Servamp and the youngest sibling, despite the fact that there are only supposed to be seven. Tsubaki has a psychotic and unstable personality, which is evident through his stated desire to "kill everyone who doesn't know him". His motives and past are currently unclear, but he has a close relation with the person who created Servamps, referring I'm as "Teacher". However, Tsubaki genuinely cares for each of his Subclasses and won't ever betray them. Tsubaki commanded a sizable force of Subclass vampires until Lawless of Greed massacred almost all of them during their attempt to kill his Eve during a piano recital. His animal form is a silver fox. His primary weapon is a Katana.
All of Love (オール・オブ・ラヴ, Ōru Obu Ravu)
Voiced by: Kazuma Horie (drama CD, anime) (Japanese); Jerry Jewell (English)
The Servamp of Lust, and bound by contract under the name Snow Lily (or simply Lily) to Misono Alicein. He is the second youngest of the eight known Servamps, and has a tendency to strip no matter the occasion. For generations he has served the Misono family alongside Doubt Doubt, the Servamp of Envy. After Mikuni killed his mother to protect Misono seven years before, Lily manipulated Misono's memory so he won't remember the reason behind Mikuni's banishment from the house out of fear that Misono would reject him for being the representation of lust. When Misono finds out about Lily's manipulation without knowing the truth, the bond between him and Misono becomes strained for a moment, giving Otogiri the opportunity to destroy his pocket watch that was also the source of his power, greatly weakening him. Since then, Lily is mostly bedridden and lost his tendency to strip as his body becomes weaker until he reverts into a baby. His animal form is a butterfly. His primary weapon is a conjured Scythe that can cut the "spirits" of its victims, rendering them unconscious.
Doubt Doubt (ダウトダウト, Dauto Dauto)
Voiced by: Kenjiro Tsuda (anime) (Japanese); Jeremy Schwartz (English)
The Servamp of Envy, and bound by contract under the name Jeje (ジェジェ) to Mikuni Alicein. Jeje is the third eldest Servamp, and possesses a quiet personality. He rarely speaks and often mumbles when he does. He is also quite gullible, believing every time Mikuni promises to give him his blood in exchange Jeje doing as he told him to, only for Mikuni to pretend not remembering the promise. Jeje used to serve Mikuni's mother and has been protecting the Alicein family together with Lily for generations. However, seven years before the start of the story, Jeje's power started to corrupt Mikuni's mother, leading her to kill Misono's mother. Jeje erased any evidence of the murder. She eventually tried to kill Misono himself but the attempt was stopped by Mikuni who killed his mother and took Jeje with him when he left the house. His animal form is a snake. Jeje's primary weapons are a pair of conjured fully automatic guns that are mostly hidden underneath his massive sleeves.
Old Child (オールドチャイルド, Ōrudo Chairudo)
Voiced by: Ayumu Murase (drama CD, anime) (Japanese); Michelle Rojas (English)
Old Child is the Servamp of Pride and is bound by contract to Tetsu Sendagaya. His contract name is Hugh (ヒュー, Hyū) and he is the second oldest of the Servamp siblings. This is despite his tiny stature, being no taller than 2'6". Hugh's most notable personality feature is his childish sense of pride, such as how he claims that Tetsu's blood is absolutely gourmet. Out of all the Servamps, Hugh has the most Subclass, to the point where they are practically his information network; he often uses them to gather intel on Tsubaki or indulge in his obsession with other people's love stories. During the group's attempt to rescue Licht and Lawless, Hugh fell into Tsubaki's trap and lost his power after being defeated. The result is the total change of Hugh's character, going from being childish to a personality of an old man, having walking and memory issues. However, when Hugh suddenly disappeared following C3's collapse, it's revealed that Tetsu and Hugh may have never formed a contract to begin with as Hugh was the one who came up with his own name rather than Tetsu. He was also the one who lured World End into meeting Tsubaki, causing the Servamp of Gluttony to lose his power. This reveals that the Jinn that comes out during Lawless and Licht's rescue operation, is in fact, World End's, meaning that Hugh never lose his power.
Lawless (ロウレス, Rōresu)
Voiced by: Ryōhei Kimura (drama CD, anime) (Japanese); Ian Sinclair (English)
Lawless is the Servamp of Greed and the fifth youngest Servamp, bound by contract to Licht Jekylland Todoroki. His contract name is Hyde (ハイド, Haido), which coincides with Licht's middle name "Jekylland", referencing the story of Jekyll and Hyde and symbolizing their antagonistic relationship. Lawless's personality is extremely unstable, as he has no interest in the value of human life and is often prone to brutally slaughtering anyone in his way. According to the Servamp of Pride, Lawless has a habit of killing his Eves if he gets bored of them. Licht, however, is an exception as Lawless enjoys his naive personality and his habit of calling himself an Angel. He used to be a Servamp of a princess named Ophelia, and fell in love with her. He was heartbroken when she married a prince from a neighbouring country and was then executed, refusing to escape with Lawless because she wanted peace between both countries. Lawless's condition worsened after he had a falling out with Kuro who decided to kill their own creator himself, leading Lawless to become the way he is now. After Licht helped him realize his true wishes, Lawless abandoned his previous view on life and finally reconciled with Kuro. He lost his power after Tsubaki destroyed his contract item, physically weakening Lawless.
The Mother (ザ・マザー, Za Mazā)
Voiced by: Ami Koshimizu (anime) (Japanese); Rachel Robinson (English)
The Servamp of Wrath and the only female Servamp. She is always frowning, giving her an impression that she is angry, though she's only trying to act cool. She was married to her Eve and together they owned an apple farm. She was later confined in C3 Tokyo HQ along with her two Subclass, Gil and Ray, though she didn't make a move nor had any intention to escape from confinement until Licht and Lawless free her. She reveals that a week before her confinement, her Eve died of old age. Lawless requests her to help stop Tsurugi, which she agrees to and saves Tsurugi when he was drowning after getting defeated by her Subclass who were trying to free her. She and Tsurugi are then trapped in the falling floor due to the impact of the prison break. To save both herself and Tsurugi, The Mother suggests that Tsurugi become her new Eve, but Tohma shot him down. She instead ends up forming a contract with Izuna Nobel, taking the contract name Freya (フレイア, Fureia).
World End (ワールドエンド, Wārudo Endo)
Voiced by: Junichi Suwabe (anime) (Japanese); Kyle Phillips (English)
The Servamp of Gluttony. True to the sin he embodies, he has an incredibly huge appetite, able to eat the whole restaurant menu. Unfortunately, he is broke and doesn't have much money. He proclaimed himself as Sleepy Ash's rival. It was recently revealed that he is contracted to a man called Niccolo Carpediem, having taken the name of Ildio (イルディオ, Irudio), and was defeated by Tsubaki and had his Jinn removed after Hugh lured him into a trap under pretext of saving the captured Lawless. World End always keeps to himself and is rather distant with every Eve he contracted with, forgetting their names once his contract with them is over. This stems from the fact that he'll never die due to his immortality while his Eves would sooner or later died.

=== Subclass ===
Sakuya Watanuki (綿貫桜哉, Watanuki Sakuya)
Voiced by: Toshinari Fukamachi (drama CD), Yūto Suzuki (anime) (Japanese); Brian Olvera (English)
Mahiru's classmate and Tsubaki's Subclass. When he was a child, he lived with his older sister and their parents. Their parents were abusive and mistreated them. One night, Sakuya watched his sister jump from their apartment room, being forced by their parents so they can get her insurance money, but not before she made them promise to spare Sakuya. Unfortunately, years later, Sakuya was forced to do the same, and when he was dying, he was saved by Tsubaki. Sakuya first met Mahiru when they were in middle school, becoming friends with him and he even went as far as manipulating Mahiru's memory to make him think that they were childhood friends. After Mahiru got into a contract with Sleepy Ash, Sakuya removed the fake memories from Mahiru and attacked him, wishing for Mahiru to end his life. Mahiru, however, refused to kill him and instead promised that he will free him of Tsubaki's control.
Belkia (ベルキア, Berukia)
Voiced by: Yoshitsugu Matsuoka (drama CD, anime) (Japanese); Mike McFarland (English)
Tsubaki's Subclass, a somewhat eccentric childish man who fights with magical playing cards and takes the form of a doll. He first appears in the first chapter, being ordered by Tsubaki to take down both Kuro and Mahiru, only to get defeated by Kuro after Mahiru finalized their contract.
Shamrock (シャムロック, Shamurokku)
Voiced by: Wataru Hatano (anime) (Japanese); Justin Cook (English)
He was Tsubaki's Subclass who always calls him "Young Master". When he was a human, Shamrock used to be a member of C3 and close friend of Shuhei's father. When he fought Tsubaki together with his teammates, he was left behind, making him believed that he has been abandoned by his friends. The heartbroken Shamrock is then recruited by Tsubaki as his Subclass and he killed Shuhei's father in retaliation. During the fight against Mahiru and his friends, he, Belkia, and Higan were captured and held captive by C3 until he was freed in the prison break instigated by The Mother's Subclasses. Shamrock is then confronted by Shuhei, whom he easily defeated. Before he could kill Shuhei, he is stopped and defeated by The Mother and Izuna. After his defeat, Shamrock is remorseful for killing Shuhei's father and resolves to make amends, leaving Tsubaki's group.
Otogiri (オトギリ)
Voiced by: Atsumi Tanezaki (anime) (Japanese); Apphia Yu (English)
She is Tsubaki's female Subclass. She is mostly seen wearing a nurse outfit. She has a special ability to use her strings to bind her opponents and also control marionettes that she uses for attacks. If necessary, she also uses her strings to control her unconscious allies' bodies and moves them to attack. She has a habit of finding something that is unexpected to be troublesome.
Lilac (ライラ, Raira)
Voiced by: Yō Taichi (anime) (Japanese); Jad Saxton (English)
Sometimes romanized as "Lila", he is Tsubaki's Subclass who survived Lawless's massacre during the ambush at Licht's piano recital. He is saved by Mahiru from Lawless and is then used as a bargaining chip to exchange the Greed Pair when the two are captured. After Tsubaki saved him, he is allowed to live freely, separate from Tsubaki's group.
Higan (ヒガン)
Voiced by: Keiji Fujiwara (anime) (Japanese); Kent Williams (English)
Higan is Tsubaki's strongest Subclass and is considered number 2 in Tsubaki's group. He has the ability to create fire from his hands and ignites flames from scratches he made on an opponent's body. When drinking human blood, he metamorphoses back into his much younger form that also significantly increases his power.
Guildenstern (ギルデンスターン, Girudensutān)
Voiced by: Shunsuke Takeuchi (anime) (Japanese); Sonny Strait (English)
Nicknamed Gil, he is Lawless' Subclass who always covers his entire body by wearing Licht's blue whale mascot costume, Whale.

=== C3 ===
Shuhei Tsuyuki (露木 修平, Tsuyuki Syūhei)
Voiced by: Kaito Ishikawa (anime) (Japanese); Austin Tindle (English)
Tsuyuki is a member of the research team in C3. He has a deep hatred for vampires after his father, who was also a C3 member, was killed by Shamrock, one of Tsubaki's Subclass. Due to this, he initially wanted to be on the fighting team, but his bad fighting style forced him to stay in Research. When he was in high school, he was Mikuni's underclassman and the two of them don't get along. He always anticipates small things that might happen and prepares in advance for when the time comes. This becomes one of the running gags in the series.
Tsurugi Kamiya (狼谷 吊戯, Kamiya Tsurugi)
Voiced by: Hiroshi Kamiya (anime) (Japanese); Joel McDonald (English)
As one of the strongest C3 members from the fighting team, Tsurugi is feared amongst vampires for mercilessly killing many of their kind, and seems to enjoy the act. He was born and grew up in C3 under the guidance of C3 Tokyo branch's vice manager, Taishi Toma. While he is cruel and even sadistic in slaying his enemies, he is cheerful and childish around other people, especially around Junichiro and Yumikage who are his best friends. He claims he has no pride and will do anything as long as he gets paid. Harshly trained under Toma's brainwashing, Tsurugi's mind became very unstable. He blindly follows Toma's orders and kills whoever's in his way, be it vampires or humans, going as far as to hurt even his own close friends under the twisted impression it is for their own protection. He used to be partnered with Mikuni and Jeje during Mikuni's time in C3, but they hate each other so much that they both have no hesitation to try and kill the other.
Junichiro Kurumamori (車守盾一郎, Kurumamori Junichirou)
Voiced by: Yoshimasa Hosoya (anime) (Japanese); Ben Phillips (English)
Junichiro is one of C3 members from the fighting team who is partnered with Tsurugi and Yumikage.
Yumikage Tsukimitsu (月満弓景, Tsukimitsu Yumikage)
Voiced by: Daisuke Ono (anime) (Japanese); Jeremy Inman (English)
Partnered with Tsurugi and Junichiro, Yumikage is one of C3's fighting division.
Taishi Toma (塔間泰士, Touma Taishi)
Toma is the vice manager of C3 Tokyo branch. He has been taking care of Tsurugi since he was a baby, saving him from his abusive family. He further manipulated Tsurugi into becoming heavily reliant on him while ignoring Tsurugi's suffering. He planned to make Tsurugi the ninth Servamp, but this was stopped by Mahiru and Kuro. After C3's collapse, Toma is presumed dead, but then make one final call to Mahiru's uncle who requests his survival to be kept a secret. It is later revealed that he is actually Mahiru's birth father. When Mahiru's mother was pregnant with Mahiru, she never told Toma, and he only learned about it after Mahiru's uncle confronted him with the revelation after her death.

=== Other characters ===
Ryusei (流星, Ryūsei)
Voiced by: Genki Okawa (anime) (Japanese); Stephen Sanders (English)
One of Mahiru's close friends since childhood.
Koyuki (小雪, Koyuki)
Voiced by: Kōtarō Nishiyama (anime) (Japanese); Alejandro Saab (English)
One of Mahiru's close friends since childhood.
Toru Shirota (徹城田, Tōru Shirota)
Voiced by: Yōji Ueda (anime) (Japanese); Sonny Strait (English)
Mahiru's uncle who took Mahiru into his care after his mother passed away. Due to his work that requires him to work abroad, Toru rarely returns home. Mahiru looks up to his uncle and considers him his role model, taking a few of his characteristics.
Johannes Mimir Faustus (ヨハネス・ミーミル・ファウストゥス, Yohanesu Mīmiru Fausutousu)
Voiced by: Kōji Yusa (anime) (Japanese); Justin Briner (English)
Johannes is a researcher obsessed with researching vampires, taking delight in doing experiments on them. He is also an acquaintance of Mikuni's.
Yuri (ユリー)
Voiced by: Ayaka Nanase (anime) (Japanese); Kristen McGuire (English)
Lily's Subclass and Mari's twin sister.
Mari (マリー)
Voiced by: Sayaka Senbongi (anime) (Japanese); Kristi Rothrock (English)
Lily's Subclass and Yuri's twin sister.
Dodo Eisuke (洞堂永介, Eisuke Dodo)
Voiced by: Koji Takahashi (anime) (Japanese); Zach Bolton (English)
Dodo is a servant of the Alicein household. He was an orphan who was saved and taken in by Lily when he was a child.
Rosen Crantz (クランツ・ローゼン, Kurantsu Rōzen)
Voiced by: Hikaru Midorikawa (anime) (Japanese); Tyson Rinehart (English)
Crantz is Licht's manager.
Ophelia (オフィーリア, Ofīria)
Voiced by: Yumi Uchiyama (anime) (Japanese); Alexis Tipton (English)
Ophelia was Lawless's Eve whom Lawless fell in love with hundreds of years before the story. She was a princess of an unknown country who made a contract with Lawless when she was a child. She wished for peace in both her own and the enemy's country, so she married the other country's prince. However, the marriage was a ploy by her kingdom, leading her to be executed. Even though she could escape, she refused to do so and instead became determined to bring the two countries together by becoming the symbol of peace, conveying her wish before she got executed. As she hoped, the two countries were united and she became the symbol of peace. Unfortunately, the country was eventually destroyed by another bigger country. Her death had a strong impact on Lawless who began to think that all lives are worthless, meaningless and no one is unique.

== Media ==
=== Manga ===
Strike Tanaka began publishing Servamp in the first issue of Media Factory's Monthly Comic Gene magazine on June 15, 2011, to December 13, 2024, where it was first tentatively titled Eve and Servamps. The chapters from the magazine have been collected into twenty-four tankōbon that have been released by Kadokawa. In July 2014 Seven Seas Entertainment announced it had licensed the series for publication in North America. Twenty adapted English-language manga volumes have been released, with more announced. In addition to print material, the series also inspired six drama CDs, the first of which was released with volume six of the manga in July 2014. The manga entered the hiatus in February 2017 due to the author's health. She had the intense pain which led to rest and recover. The manga resumed on April 15, 2017, after she was recovered from her pain. The 24th and final volume was released on December 27, 2024.

==== Volume list ====
No.	Original release date	Original ISBN	English release date	English ISBN
1	December 27, 2011	978-4-04-066261-9	March 17, 2015	978-1-626921-75-7
2	June 27, 2012	978-4-04-066234-3	June 16, 2015	978-1-626921-76-4
3	December 27, 2012	978-4-04-066235-0	September 15, 2015	978-1-626921-83-2
4	April 27, 2013	978-4-04-066236-7	December 8, 2015	978-1-626922-23-5
5	December 27, 2013	978-4-04-066171-1	March 22, 2016	978-1-626922-53-2
6	July 26, 2014	978-4-04-066822-2	June 21, 2016	978-1-626922-81-5
7	December 27, 2014	978-4-04-067233-5	September 20, 2016	978-1-626923-17-1
8	July 27, 2015	978-4-04-067565-7	December 13, 2016	978-1-626923-69-0
9	December 26, 2015	978-4-04-067868-9	March 28, 2017	978-1-626924-58-1
10	July 27, 2016	978-4-04-068283-9	August 8, 2017	978-1-626925-20-5
10.5	July 27, 2016	978-4-04-068295-2	—	—
11	December 27, 2017	978-4-04-068806-0	July 24, 2018	978-1-626925-95-3
12	March 27, 2018	978-4-04-069766-6	May 28, 2019	978-1-626927-27-8
13	October 25, 2018	978-4-04-069981-3	November 26, 2019	978-1-642757-34-7
14	July 26, 2019	978-4-04-065587-1	September 29, 2020	978-1-64505-526-6
15	March 27, 2020	978-4-04-064494-3	June 29, 2021	978-1-64827-218-9
16	December 25, 2020	978-4-04-680039-8	May 24, 2022	978-1-63858-160-4
17	August 26, 2021	978-4-04-680629-1	October 25, 2022	978-1-63858-615-9
18	March 26, 2022	978-4-04-681237-7	May 30, 2023	978-1-63858-901-3
19	October 27, 2022	978-4-04-681786-0	October 17, 2023	979-8-88843-020-0
20	June 27, 2023	978-4-04-682595-7	July 2, 2024	979-8-88843-793-3
21	December 26, 2023	978-4-04-683119-4	February 25, 2025	979-8-89160-884-9
22	October 25, 2024	978-4-04-684080-6	September 16, 2025	979-8-89373-960-2
23	November 27, 2024	978-4-04-684102-5	April 21, 2026	979-8-89561-581-2
24	December 27, 2024	978-4-04-684103-2	—	—

=== Music ===
In addition to drama CDs the series has also produced several character song CDs, as well as an original soundtrack CD. In total there have been five character pair CDs, released in 2015, as well as a character song mini-album and an original soundtrack, both of which have been released in October 2016. The anime series also had an opening song, "Deal With" by Oldcodex, and an ending song, "Sunlight Avenue" by Takuma Terashima.

=== Anime ===
An anime television adaptation was announced in the August issue of Monthly Comic Gene. It was reported by Oricon Style that the adaptation would be a television series. The anime was produced by Brain's Base and Platinum Vision with Itto Sara serving as the chief director, Hideaki Nakano as director and Kenji Konuta handling series composition, with character designs by Junko Yamanaka and music by Kenji Kawai. The anime aired from July to September 2016. Funimation had licensed the series outside Asia for streaming on their website. In Southeast Asia, Muse Communication holds the license to the series.

==== Episode list ====
No.	Title	Original release date
1	"Mahiru and Kuro" "Mahiru to Kuro" (真昼とクロ)	July 5, 2016
After his mother passed away long ago from a car accident, freshman student Mahiru Shirota was taken in by his workaholic uncle Toru Shirota. Talented in completing household chores and class projects, Mahiru picks up a stray black cat, giving the name Kuro and gifting a cat bell. The next day after school, Mahiru learns that Kuro is a vampire named Sleepy Ash who metamorphoses into a little black cat if exposed to sunlight. Mahiru accidentally forms a temporary contract with Sleepy Ash after addressing him as Kuro in his human form. Kuro explains that he is the Servamp of Sloth, who is obligated to obey orders from and drink the blood of their master known as an Eve. The temporary contract will expire as long as Kuro does not drink the blood of Mahiro within 24 hours, but the catch is that they cannot be separated. Later in the shopping district, Mahiru and Kuro are attacked by a vampire named Belkia, who is a Subclass, a vampire created by a Servamp. Reluctantly, Mahiru permits Kuro to drink his blood, finalizing their contract and easily defeating Belkia, who then metamorphoses into a doll.
2	"Tsubaki" "Tsubaki" (椿)	July 12, 2016
Mahiru and Kuro are approached by Tsubaki, the Servamp of Melancholy who ordered Belkia to attack Kuro. Tsubaki reveals that there are seven Servamp siblings who collectively represent the seven deadly sins, but he is the forgotten eighth and youngest Servamp sibling who metamorphoses into a silver fox. After Mahiru berates Tsubaki for not facing his feelings, Mahiro and Kuro are secretly rescued in the nick of time by All of Love, the Servamp of Lust. Mahiro and Kuro are escorted by Misono Alicein to his mansion. All of Love was given the name Snow Lily, who metamorphoses into a butterfly. Misono initially demands Mahiru to relinquish Kuro in an effort to eliminate Tsubaki. Snow Lily introduces twins sisters Yuri and Mari, among his school of children, as his Subclass to Mahiru. After sympathizing with Misono, Mahiro proposes an alliance between them as a compromise.
3	"About the Future That Never Came" "Otozurenakatta Mirai ni Tsuite" (訪れなかった未来について)	July 19, 2016
After Misono informs Mahiro about the Lead, weapons that Eves can acquire from their Servamps, Mahiru travels into Kuro's subconscious and chooses a weapon in the form of a broom. Meanwhile, Mahiru's classmate Sakuya Watanuki is revealed to be one of Tsubaki's Subclass. The next day, Mahiru realizes that his childhood memories of Sakuya are beginning to fade. Sakuya later lures Mahiru and Kuro in an alley, where Otogiri binds them with strings from afar while Sakuya admits to being one of Tsubaki's Subclass after revealing that he has known Mahiru for only one year. Mahiru and Kuro are saved by the timely arrival of Misono and Snow Lily, in which Misono harnesses the power of his Lead in the form of a chair to defeat Belkia. Otogiri briefly controls Belkia's unconscious body as a distraction for Sakuya to severely injure Misono in the process. Despite this horrifying dilemma, Mahiru gains the resolve to fight back using his Lead.
4	"Sakuya" "Sakuya" (桜哉)	July 26, 2016
Kuro becomes overwhelmed by Mahiru's emotions of uncertainty. As Mahiru becomes engulfed by Kuro's power, Sakuya admittedly tries to convince Mahiru to kill him. However, Tsubaki's Subclass are forced to retreat and Misono is taken to the hospital when Kuro is thwarted by Doubt Doubt, the Servamp of Envy. Doubt Doubt was given the name Jeje by his Eve, revealed as a traveling antique dealer, who offers a way for Mahiru to nullify his contract with Kuro if need be. At home, Mahiru is left confused whether his power does more harm than good. Mahiru meets Tsubaki by chance at a sushi bar, where Tsubaki explains how Sakuya became one of his Subclass. During childhood, Sakuya's older sister was forced to commit suicide by jumping off her apartment balcony so their abusive parents could receive her life insurance payout. Six years later, Tsubaki managed to save Sakuya from following suit. In the present, Mahiru's childhood friends Ryusei and Koyuki have forgotten about Sakuya at school. Mahiru eventually reconciles with Sakuya after a confrontation during the school cultural festival. Mahiru promises to stop Tsubaki so Sakuya can finally be liberated.
5	"I Am an Adult. This is Society" "Ore wa Otona, Koko wa Shakai" (俺は大人, ここは社会)	August 2, 2016
Kuro quickly dismisses a sealed letter that Mahiru received as junk mail. Later at a summer festival, Mahiru and Kuro are approached by Shamrock, unbeknownst to them as one of Tsubaki's Subclass, who tasks Mahiru to deliver a silver briefcase to the lost and found. As Mahiru meets a tall boy carrying a coffin implied to be harboring a dormant vampire, another silver briefcase causes an explosion to occur nearby. Mahiru summons Kuro to hurl the silver briefcase into the sky, but it plummets too fast. After catching the silver briefcase to safely detonate inside his coffin left intact, the tall boy introduces himself as Tetsu Sendagaya, the heir of a hot springs resort. Tetsu is the Eve of Old Child, the Servamp of Pride given the name Hugh. Upon returning home, a neutral organization between humans and vampires called C3 kidnaps Mahiru and attacks Kuro. A scientist named Syuhei Tsuyuki, who wants to capture Tsubaki, threatens that Mahiru will die from being separated from Kuro too long. Refusing to cooperate in the annihilation of Tsubaki's Subclass, Mahiru escapes from the laboratory using his Lead before rescuing Kuro from three vampire hunters named Tsurugi Kamiya, Junichiro Kurumamori and Yumikage Tsukimitsu.
6	"Angel or Demon" "Tenshi ka Akuma" (天使か悪魔)	August 9, 2016
Miharu, Kuro, Misono and Snow Lily visit Tetsu and Hugh at the hot springs resort. Hugh confirms that there is a suspicious guy defeating another Subclass. In the shopping district, Mahiro and Kuro tail the suspicious guy, who has captured a Servamp that metamorphoses into a hedgehog. The suspicious guy is revealed to be Licht Jekllyland Todoroki, who is the Eve of Lawless, the Servamp of Greed. However, Licht and Lawless refuse form an alliance with Mahiru and Kuro. After learning that Licht is an Austrian pianist holding a recital at a concert hall, Mahiru and Kuro soon realize that Tsubaki sponsored the recital as a mere trap to send the weaker members of his Subclass to ambush Licht and Lawless. Upon massacring nearly all of his assailants, Lawless brings up an incident when Kuro was the deciding vote amongst his younger siblings to carry out an order from C3. Licht stops Lawless from picking a fight with Kuro, but Licht's manager Rosen Crantz and Lawless's Subclass Guildenstern arrive to intervene. Mahiru decides to take custody of Lilac, one of Tsubaki's Subclass who solely survived Lawless's massacre, while an enraged Tsubaki directly confronts Lawless for his bloodthirsty behavior.
7	"Because I Am..." "Nazenara Ore wa" (なぜなら俺は)	August 16, 2016
At the hot springs resort, Mahiru tells Misono and Tetsu that Tsubaki may come to rescue Lilac. Ever since Lawless brought up the past incident of Kuro being the deciding vote, Kuro has been acting strangely. The next day, Crantz contacts Mahiru to inform that Lawless has gone missing and Licht is feeling unwell. At a park, Licht encounters Higan, the most powerful member of Tsubaki's Subclass, who was sent to capture Licht. As Mahiru and Kuro arrive to intervene, Kuro suddenly transforms into a black ball. Mahiro stands there helpless as Higan manages to capture Licht. Misono and Tetsu come to the park and learn of the aftermath. Using the cellphone that Higan had misplaced earlier, Misono contacts Tsubaki and demands to trade Licht and Lawless for Lilac. Back at the hot springs resort, Misono and Tetsu formulate a plan for the trade with sixteen hours left, while Mahiru vows to revert Kuro to normal after discovering that he is doing fine inside the black ball.
8	"Nothing Begins Without Action" "Hajime ni Okonai Ariki" (はじめに行いありき)	August 23, 2016
Mahiru, Misono and Tetsu are unable to free Kuro from the black ball. Mahiru remembers about the traveling antique dealer after Crantz bought a water gun with holy water at an antique shop. At the antique shop, Miharu is greeted by a vampire researcher named Johannes Mimir Faustus and the traveling antique dealer, now recognized as Misono's older brother Mikuni Alicein. Meanwhile, Misono's servant Dodo Eisuke says that Tsubaki is staying at the Tokyo World Tree Hotel, based on a photo taken of the Tokyo Opera Hall on Higan's cellphone. Mikuni explains that a Subclass can be broken if a Servamp drinks their blood, while a Servamp can be broken if their Eve destroys the item that was gifted along with the given name. Johannes then tricks Mahiru into drinking laced tea that sends him into Kuro's subconscious. After confirming that Tsubaki left the hotel, Misono, Snow Lily, Tetsu, Hugh, Crantz and Guildenstern begin to carry out their rescue operation for Licht and Lawless. However, Misono encounters Sakuya on the elevator, having fallen right into Tsubaki's trap.
9	"I'm Not Wrong" "Ore wa Machigattenai" (俺は間違ってない)	August 30, 2016
Guildenstern distracts Tsubaki in the forest to buy some time. Misono and Snow Lily fight against Sakuya at the ground floor, while Tetsu and Hugh are blocked by Belkia, Shamrock, Otogiri and Higan at the top floor. Licht and Lawless break free from being shackled in neighboring holding cells after clashing with each other during a heated argument. Mahiru enters Kuro's subconscious, where he witnesses the memory when the seven Servamps voted on whether or not they should kill their creator. Kuro cast the deciding vote in the affirmative, though earning disdain from Lawless as one of the three Servamps who objected alongside the Servamp of Wrath named The Mother and the Servamp of Gluttony named World End. Despite personally doing the deed, Kuro starts to have uncertainty and regret in his resolve, leaving him to doubt his own actions. Mahiru calls out for Kuro and urges him to face his past. After Mahiru assures that he will always be there for Kuro, this finally convinces Kuro to return with Mahiru.
10	"Lawless" "Rauresu" (ロウレス)	September 6, 2016
Licht points out that Lawless shows cowardice by devaluing human life, leading Lawless to become enraged by this accusation. Centuries ago, Lawless was a Servamp for his former Eve named Ophelia, a princess whom he fell in love with. However, he was heartbroken when she agreed to an arranged marriage with a prince from a neighboring country to form an alliance. The arranged marriage was just a ploy for her kingdom to attack. Before Ophelia was executed, she gave an inspiring speech that eventually brought peace to both countries. The seven Servamps were called to a meeting regarding the request to kill their creator. Kuro's decision to kill their creator further disillusioned Lawless's view that human life is meaningless, especially when the country that Ophelia tried to protect in sacrifice was ultimately destroyed by another country. In the present, Licht plays Für Elise on the piano and urges Lawless to be honest with his own feelings, leading Lawless to be given the name Hyde. Licht and Hyde break free from confinement, only to encounter Higan shortly afterwards.
11	"For Not Forgiving Me" "Yurusanaide Kurete" (許さないでくれて)	September 13, 2016
Licht and Hyde push Higan to the limit with his ability to conjure flames. Mikuni and Jeje arrives to face against Sakuya, urging Misono and Snow Lily to meet up with Tetsu and Hugh, who are dealing with Belkia, Shamrock and Otogiri. Belkia traps Hugh in a vanishing magic box, leaving Tetsu powerless. Misono prepares to retreat until Mahiru shows up with Kuro, now taking the form of a giant black lion. With his Lead taking the form of a spear, Mahiru and Kuro easily defeats Belkia, Shamrock and Otogiri. Meanwhile, with his Lead taking the form of a piano, Licht and Hyde eventually defeat Higan. As Mahiru arrives to save Licht, Kuro takes the opportunity to finally reconcile with Hyde. Their reunion is short-lived when Lilac steals Hyde's dog tag as his item, still feeling bitter that Hyde massacred his comrades during the piano recital. The situation escalates when Tsubaki returns to the hotel.
12	"Thinking Simply..." "Shinpuru ni Kangaete..." (シンプルに考えて)	September 20, 2016
After revealing that Hugh has been defeated, Tsubaki proceeds to destroy Hyde's dog tag, causing Hyde to cut ties with Licht. Recognizing Kuro as the one who killed their creator, Tsubaki becomes dedicated in trying to fulfill their creator's expectation of destroying the world. Against Mikuni's advice, Mahiru chooses to stay and fight by Kuro's side. Meanwhile, Misono, Tetsu and Licht evacuate with help from C3, and Hugh is shown to be safe and sound. After Sakuya shields Mahiru from being stabbed by Tsubaki, Mahiru transforms his Lead into a key that unlocks memories within Tsubaki's heart. In the past, Tsubaki saw himself as an outcast among his seven older Servamp siblings. After Kuro killed their creator, Tsubaki sought vengeance against Kuro ever since. In the present, Mahiru and Kuro eventually manage to get through to Tsubaki, thus ending their fight. Afterwards, Tsubaki instructs Sakuya to tell his Subclass to forget about him and live freely. The Eves and Servamps then return to their normal everyday lives.

==== Film ====
A sequel anime film titled Servamp: Alice in the Garden premiered in Japan on April 7, 2018. The film was produced by Platinum Vision. Hideaki Nakano and Junko Yamanaka returned for the direction and character designs respectively, while Ayumu Hisao served as scriptwriter. The film's theme song is "One Side" by Oldcodex.

=== Stage play ===
A stage play adaptation of the manga ran in Tokyo's Kokumin Kyōsai coop Hall / Space Zero from November 27 to December 6, 2020. It had also been scheduled to run in Osaka on December 19 and December 20, 2020, but was canceled due to the ongoing COVID-19 pandemic. The stage play starred Ryohei Takenaka as Mahiru Shirota, Kyouhei Chida as Kuro, Ryu Kiyama as Misono Alicein, Yuya Tominaga as Snow Lily, Reo Hotta as Mikuni Alicein, Ken Kato as Tetsu Sendagaya, Nagato Okui as Hugh, Yuta Kishimoto as Licht Jekylland Todoroki, Yuta Osumi as Lawless, Mondo Ukai as Higan, Masaki Matsuda as Sakuya Watanuki, Shuto Washio as Belkia, and Taiko Katono as Tsubaki.

== Reception ==
On Anime News Network, Rebecca Silverman gave the first three English language adapted manga volumes a combined overall grade of B.
