= Love of Kill =

Japanese manga series

- Cover of Love of Kill volume 1 by Media Factory

殺し愛 (Koroshi Ai)
- Genre: Mystery, romance, suspense
- Manga
- Written by: Fe
- Published by: Media Factory
- English publisher: NA: Yen Press
- Imprint: MF Comics Gene Series
- Magazine: Monthly Comic Gene
- Original run: October 15, 2015 – January 14, 2023
- Volumes: 13
- Anime television series
- Directed by: Hideaki Ōba
- Produced by: Soujirou Arimizu; Norio Fukui; Hideo Hirata; Sora Kimura; Nobuhiko Kurosu; Nori Yada; Yuki Matsuura
- Written by: Ayumu Hisao
- Music by: Kei Yoshikawa
- Studio: Platinum Vision
- Licensed by: Crunchyroll
- Original network: Tokyo MX, SUN, KBS Kyoto, BS NTV, AT-X
- Original run: January 13, 2022 – March 31, 2022
- Episodes: 12
- Manga

After the File
- Written by: Fe
- Published by: Media Factory
- English publisher: NA: Yen Press
- Imprint: MF Comics Gene Series
- Magazine: Monthly Comic Gene
- Original run: May 15, 2023 – February 15, 2024
- Volumes: 1
- icon

Love of Kill (Japanese: 殺し愛, Hepburn: Koroshi Ai) (Note: A pun on the Japanese word for "killing each other" (殺し合い, koroshiai).) is a Japanese manga series written and illustrated by Fe. It was serialized in Media Factory's shōjo manga magazine Monthly Comic Gene from October 2015 to January 2023. The manga is licensed in North America by Yen Press. An anime television series adaptation by Platinum Vision aired from January to March 2022.

== Plot ==
During one of her bounty hunter missions, Chateau Dankworth comes across Song Ryang-ha, a professional hitman, who begins stalking and brokering her information in exchange for a date. Though reluctant, Chateau complies yet refuses to open up to him. Despite this, Ryang-ha continues to save her when she is under attack and seems to know her past.

After Chateau and Ryang-ha both become targeted by Donald Bachmann, the two are forced to confront their common past: Chateau is the daughter of the heir to the Nobel family, a lineage of French aristocrats, who becomes targeted by Nelson Nobel, her father's stepbrother. The real Song Ryang-ha was ordered to escort her to safety, but she accidentally inflicts a fatal gunshot wound on him out of fear; meanwhile, the current Ryang-ha, a nameless victim of child trafficking saved by the real Ryang-ha, adopts his name after the latter dies.

== Characters ==
Chateau Dankworth (シャトー・ダンクワース, Shatō Dankuwāsu)
Voiced by: Mikako Komatsu (drama CD), Saori Ōnishi (anime) (Japanese); Erin Yvette (English)
Chateau is a newly recruited bounty hunter working for Ritzland Support. She is reluctant to trust Ryang-ha and constantly rejects his romantic advances. After she is captured by Donald, she is forced to remember that her true name is Chateau Nobel, the daughter of the heir to the Nobel family, who was escorted by the real Song Ryang-ha after her father's stepbrother ordered the Hong Kong triads to assassinate him. Chateau accidentally inflicted a fatal gunshot wound on the real Ryang-ha during the mission and went into a catatonic state, until she was found by Officer Dankworth. Despite knowing her true identity, Chateau rejects her nobility and declares herself to be a member of the Dankworth family.
Song Ryang-ha (ソン・リャンハ, Son Ryanha)
Voiced by: Koji Yusa (drama CD), Hiro Shimono (anime) (Japanese); Ryan Colt Levy (English)
Ryang-ha is a hitman wanted by at least 20 organizations for singlehandedly taking down the Hong Kong triads. Since meeting Chateau, he stalks and brokers her information in exchange for spending time with her. After the two go on the run from Donald, flashbacks from their past reveal that he is a nameless victim of child trafficking who was saved by the real Song Ryang-ha and adopts his name after the latter dies.
Euripedes Ritzland (エウリペデス・リッツラン, Euripedesu Rittsuran)
Voiced by: Kenjiro Tsuda (drama CD), Kenyu Horiuchi (anime) (Japanese); Mick Lauer (English)
Ritzland is the owner of Ritzland Support and is married to a 25-year-old entrepreneur.
Indian (インド人, Indo-jin)
Voiced by: Tetsuya Kakihara (drama CD), Kōhei Amasaki (anime) (Japanese); A.J. Beckles (English)
Indian, whose real name and personal details are unknown, is an immigrant from India working as a secretary at Ritzland Support. He is named Jim (ジム, Jimu) in the anime adaptation.
Hou (ホー, Hō)
Voiced by: Tomoaki Maeno (anime) (Japanese); Alejandro Saab (English)
Donny (ドニー, Donī)
Voiced by: Hōchū Ōtsuka (anime)
Jinon (ジノン)
Voiced by: Ayumu Murase (anime) (Japanese); Erica Mendez (English)
Nikka (ニッカ)
Voiced by: Masakazu Morita (anime) (Japanese); Nicolas Roye (English)
Mifa (ミファ)
Voiced by: Yoko Hikasa (anime)
Song Ryang-ha (ソン・リャンハ, Son Ryanha)
Voiced by: Toshiki Masuda (Japanese); Chris Hackney (English)
The real Song Ryang-ha is a Korean student and apprentice of Donald Bachmann. He was ordered to escort Chateau to safety, but on the way, he took in the current Song Ryang-ha to save him from child trafficking. After Chateau accidentally kills him, the current Song Ryang-ha adopts his name.

== Media ==
=== Manga ===
Love of Kill is a manga series written and illustrated by Fe. Fe first published the story on Pixiv under the title I Wanted to Read a Manga About an Assassin Couple in Love so I Started Drawing One (殺し愛カップル漫画が読みてぇなぁと思ってたらなんか書き始めてた, Koroshiai Kappuru Manga ga Yomitē nā to Omotteta kara Nanka Kaki Hajimeteta) in October 2012 and gained over 5.4 million views on the website. Fe followed up with a sequel titled A Short Story About the Assassin Couple in Love Manga that I Just Wanted to Read About (殺し愛カップル漫画が読みたいだけの小話, Koroshiai Kappuru Manga ga Yomitai Dake no Shōsetsu). Within three years of the stories being published, it was picked up for serialization by Media Factory's shōjo manga magazine Monthly Comic Gene since October 2015 and has been collected in thirteen tankōbon volumes. In November 2022, the series reached its climax, with the series ending in January 2023.

A drama CD adaptation was released as a bonus item bundled with the physical release of the March 2018 issue of Monthly Comic Gene, released on February 15, 2018.

A spin-off manga that takes place after the original manga's ending was serialized in the same magazine from May 15, 2023, to February 15, 2024.

In October 2020, Love of Kill was licensed in English for North America distribution by Yen Press.

==== Volumes ====
No.	Original release date	Original ISBN	English release date	English ISBN
1	March 26, 2016	978-4-04-068238-9	March 30, 2021	978-1-9753-2281-6
2	October 27, 2016	978-4-04-068570-0	June 1, 2021	978-1-9753-2528-2
3	April 27, 2017	978-4-04-069159-6	August 10, 2021	978-1-9753-2543-5
4	October 27, 2017	978-4-04-069478-8	October 5, 2021	978-1-9753-2545-9
5	April 27, 2018	978-4-04-069831-1	November 23, 2021	978-1-9753-2547-3
6	October 25, 2018	978-4-04-065192-7	February 22, 2022	978-1-9753-2549-7
7	April 27, 2019	978-4-04-065652-6	April 26, 2022	978-1-9753-2551-0
8	October 26, 2019	978-4-04-064085-3	June 21, 2022	978-1-9753-2553-4
9	June 27, 2020	978-4-04-064561-2	August 23, 2022	978-1-9753-2555-8
10	December 25, 2020	978-4-04-680044-2	January 17, 2023	978-1-9753-4196-1
11	July 27, 2021	978-4-04-680554-6	March 21, 2023	978-1-9753-5018-5
12	March 26, 2022	978-4-04-681236-0	July 18, 2023	978-1-9753-6726-8
13	January 26, 2023	978-4-04-682071-6	December 12, 2023	978-1-9753-7671-0
14	February 27, 2024	978-4-04-683212-2	February 18, 2025	979-8-8554-1106-5

=== Anime ===
On December 11, 2020, Kadokawa announced that an anime television series adaptation is in production. The series is animated by Platinum Vision and directed by Hideaki Ōba, with Ayumu Hisao handling the series' scripts, Yōko Satō designing the characters, and Kei Yoshikawa composing the music. It aired from January 13 to March 31, 2022, on Tokyo MX and other networks. The opening theme song is "Midnight Dancer" by Toshiki Masuda, while the ending theme song is "Makoto Period" by Aika Kobayashi. Crunchyroll streamed the series.

On January 13, 2022, Crunchyroll announced that the series will receive an English dub, which would premiere on February 23.

==== Episode list ====
No.	Title	Directed by (Note: Information is taken from the ending credits of each episode.)	Written by	Storyboarded by	Original release date (Note: Episodes are released every Wednesday at 11:30 p.m. JST on d Anime Store, 30 minutes before the original air time television.)
1	"What's Your Name?"	Hideaki Ōba	Ayumu Hisao	Hiroaki Yoshikawa	January 13, 2022
New bounty hunter Chateau Dankworth meets master assassin Song Ryang-ha and is defeated by him, so she is surprised when he tries to flirt with her. Over the next month, Song constantly invites her on dates, even capturing valuable bounty targets for her to get her attention, but she ignores him. Chateau's boss, Euripedes Ritzland, is asked to apprehend Song who 8 years previously assassinated dozens of high ranking triad members. Euripedes warns Chateau to focus on her current less dangerous target. Chateau is contacted by Song who has already captured her target and requests a date on Christmas Eve which she reluctantly agrees to. On Christmas Eve, Song has a good time while Chateau stubbornly refuses to accept it is a date. Over dinner in his hotel room, Song reveals Chateau's target, a pimp who would rob his girlfriend's clients, is dead and stored away for Chateau to collect, though Chateau is suspicious he wants nothing in return except time with her. Euripedes witnesses Song with Chateau and is unsure what to make of it. Via flashback it is shown Chateau was found as a child with a dead unidentified man and unable to remember her name.
2	"Target"	Hideaki Ōba	Ayumu Hisao	Hideaki Ōba	January 20, 2022
A man watches Song returning home. Euripedes worries about Chateau getting involved with Song. Chateau retrieves the body of her pimp target. Euripedes reveals to Chateau the man who hired them to find Song, the eldest son of a triad boss, was just assassinated by Song. Chateau is shot at by a man with a spiderweb face tattoo, causing her to crash off the road. Song becomes suspicious when Chateau, who normally rejects his calls instantly, starts letting the phone ring endlessly. Spiderweb chases Chateau into the woods and overpowers her. Song arrives, finds Chateau's car and tricks Spiderweb into answering Chateau's phone revealing their location. Spiderweb leaves Chateau alive but gives her a message for Song that he is a traitor and must pay for his past. Chateau awakens in a hotel where Song admits her current situation was indirectly caused by mistakes he made. As she has a fever, Chateau passes out again but tells him about the spiderweb tattoo. Song cannot be sure but he suspects he has met Spiderweb somewhere before. Due to her fever, Chateau dreams about the night she was found as a child with the dead man.
3	"Room"	Motohiko Niwa	Ayumu Hisao	Motohiko Niwa	January 27, 2022
Seeming depressed Chateau has a shower but is furious when Song manages to take her clothes to be cleaned, including her underwear. Before she leaves, she passes on Spiderweb's message. Song remembers 5 years previously when he and Spiderweb, revealed to be called Hou, both worked for the same organization and Hou was furious when Song was going to be promoted first despite Hou having worked there longer. Chateau returns to the office where Euripedes is upset at her absence plus the destruction of her car. Chateau later finds Song at her home. He notices a picture that interests him of Chateau with her parents. Chateau reveals Euripedes knows about him but Song is not worried since if it is revealed Chateau and the company benefitted from Song capturing bounties for them, their reputation would be ruined, so their only choices are to kill him or work with him secretly. Chateau is confused why Song is risking his life, but he points out she is doing the same by associating with him, having not once properly rejected him. Chateau's mother calls to remind her about the anniversary of her father's death, upsetting her, so Song leaves.
4	"Real Face"	Norihiko Nagahama	Ayumu Hisao	Hiroaki Yoshikawa	February 3, 2022
Chateau visits her father's grave while her mother meets a young man named Brian, a friend of Chateau's from childhood, and decides to tell him the truth. Song meets Chateau in the cemetery's church but she declines to spend time with him. Three men attack the church so Song kills two and interrogates the third, learning the target was actually Chateau. Chateau rushes to find the church's missing nun and finds Hou holding her hostage. Despite fighting back, Hou knocks Chateau unconscious. Song calls Hou to demand to know what he wants. Chateau's mother reveals how she and her husband adopted Chateau at a young age as her husband had been the police officer in charge when Chateau was discovered with the dead body whose passport identified him as Song Ryang-ha. Chateau claimed her surname was Nobel, but no record of a Chateau Nobel existed anywhere and when the case went cold Chateau was adopted and became Chateau Dankworth. Song meets and defeats Hou but the car he was hiding Chateau in explodes. Despite having been shot, Hou draws a knife and insists they continue their fight.
5	"Limit"	Hideaki Ōba	Ayumu Hisao	Hideaki Ōba	February 10, 2022
It is shown Chateau escaped the explosion. Hou remembers how a triad member, Seung-woo, took him in when he was a drug addict and became his mentor, before Song killed Seung-woo during his assassination of the triad leaders. Hou manages to stab Song but is shot and killed. Song retrieves Chateau and escapes but passes out from his wound. Another unknown assassin reports Hou's defeat to his boss and asks what to do next. With help from Jim, Euripedes' secretary, Chateau gets Song to a back-alley doctor, but Jim also reports everything to Euripedes, so Chateau suggests Song quietly disappear before Euripedes arrives. Song offers to take her with him to a life free of responsibility, but she refuses so he leaves, after teasing her first. Euripedes suspends Chateau for three weeks. After her suspension ends, Song contacts Chateau to inform her he is leaving on a trip. Chateau begins to suffer memory flashes of the dead man while he was still alive. Chateau, Euripedes and Jim all go undercover on the cruise ship Artemisia to guard one of Euripedes' relatives, a VIP highly influential in world politics and finance. Song also boards the ship, as does the unknown assassin.
6	"Dark Dream"	Motohiko Niwa	Ayumu Hisao	Hiroaki Yoshikawa	February 17, 2022
In the past, an unnamed child is rescued by a man, who names the child Song Ryang-ha. Chateau and Jim learn the VIP is Hawk, Euripedes' wife who owns a multibillion-dollar corporation and, through her powerful family, is politically connected. Song appears before Chateau, who suspects he is there to assassinate Hawk. Song neither confirms nor denies this but instead challenges Chateau; as long as Chateau can see him he will not do anything. With Euripedes' agreement, Chateau agrees to share a room with Song for the whole voyage, with Euripedes and Jim monitoring via cameras. Song notices Chateau is struggling to sleep and, after some teasing, carries her to bed where she quickly falls asleep, surprising Song that she must trust him. Song points out Chateau's clothes make her stand out while she should be undercover, so he takes her dress shopping, despite her obvious discomfort. Jim arranges extra reinforcements to keep Hawk safe. Euripedes asks to meet Song in private, revealing he knows Chateau does not remember much of her past except that her original surname might be Nobel. Jim's reinforcements, Jose and Cedran, arrive. Song evades Chateau to meet Euripedes at the rear of the ship, his disappearance worrying Chateau. Euripedes is stabbed in the throat by an unknown attacker.
7	"Bullet"	Motohiko Niwa	Ayumu Hisao	Motohiko Niwa	February 24, 2022
It is shown Euripedes was stabbed by the unknown assassin. Song directs Chateau where to find Euripedes and chases the assassin who escapes after warning Song he and Chateau must remain on the ship. Euripedes manages to tell Chateau it was not Song who stabbed him before he is flown to hospital with Hawk and Jim. Chateau is confronted by the assassin Jinon Won. Chateau locates Song and points her gun at him, Jinon having offered to spare her mother's life and pay her a large sum in exchange for Song. Surprisingly, Song agrees to be handed to Jinon. Overcome by guilt at Song's agreement to be traded and fear for her mother, Chateau attempts to shoot herself so Jinon no longer has a reason to kill her mother, but Song angrily stops her and begins choking her while insisting she be more honest with herself and others. Jose and Cedran are suspicious the voyage has not been cancelled following Euripedes' departure. Jinon's boss is shown manipulating events. Song chokes Chateau unconscious. Via flashback, Song is shown as a teenager diligently studying so he can one day work for Donny, the man who rescued and named him. However, Donny instead gave Song an important secret mission.
8	"Confusion"	Hiromichi Matano	Ayumu Hisao	Hiroaki Yoshikawa	March 3, 2022
Chateau dreams of being in the car with the dead man who told her he is Song Ryang-ha, a friend, and she told him she is Chateau Nobel. Jinon murders Jose and Cedran. Euripedes finally wakes up so Jim decides to meet the ship at the next port, but is shot by another assassin. At the port, Song leaves the ship and meets Jinon, explaining he has left Chateau aboard as she is not to be involved further. Jinon and another assassin, Nikka, begin driving Song to meet their employer, who they claim is Donald Bachmann, a.k.a. Donny, whom Song claims he does not know and resists Nikka's attempt to interrogate him further. Chateau is located aboard the ship by Jim who survived with minor injuries thanks to his car's bulletproof glass. They attempt to leave the ship but are stopped by Jim's would-be assassin who tries to capture Chateau. Working together, the assassin is shot and knocked out. Donny calls the assassins phone but Chateau does not answer it. Song is taken handcuffed and blindfolded to meet Donny.
9	"A War Trigger"	Hideaki Ōba	Ayumu Hisao	Hideaki Ōba	March 10, 2022
Donny explains his assassins are anonymous orphans he raised himself. He also reveals Song Ryang-ha was the name he gave one of his orphans who died, meaning Song is not the original Song Ryang-ha, but an impostor. Chateau and Jim smuggle themselves off the ship with the injured assassin who explains Donny is known as the Trigger and is paid by clients to use his assassins to start wars all over the world. Chateau asks Jim to protect her parents, and then resigns so her actions will no longer tarnish Euripedes' reputation. Nikka allows Song to free himself so they can fight. Several guards are killed and Song's recently repaired wound is reopened. Chateau breaks down the gate to Donny's mansion with a truck. Song weakens from blood loss and through flashback shows that when he was a child he was also in the car with young Chateau and the real Ryang-ha. Song collapses and seems to accept his death. Bored, Nikka casually reveals Chateau is outside before walking away. Jinon confronts Nikka over letting Song go. Forcing himself to recover, Song rescues Chateau from the guards and happily calls her an idiot for almost dying trying to rescue him.
10	"Help"	Motohiko Niwa	Ayumu Hisao	Motohiko Niwa	March 17, 2022
Chateau and Song hide in a homeless camp to treat Song's injuries. To atone for accidentally helping Song escape, Nikka promises to find and kill him. Chateau and Song awkwardly thank each other for saving each other. Donny decides not to send Nikka after Song but still demands they find Chateau who he has been searching for since she was a child. Song is forced to pickpocket for cash, revealing that due to an unpleasant childhood he was forced to learn criminal skills before learning to read or write, causing Chateau to feel guilty. Chateau wonders about Donny's organization and why they are interested in her, but Song refuses to answer. Angry, Chateau attempts to leave to find out herself. Song loses his temper and threatens to snap her wrist to keep her obedient, but then relents and explains he is not willing to lose her after he spent so many years trying to find her after losing her the first time. Chateau suddenly remembers that when she was a child she shot someone. Via flashback it is shown that Donny had asked the original Ryang-ha to look after a man named Lizst Nobel, and on his way to meet Lizst he encountered and then saved a young Song from child traffickers.
11	"Worst"	Mitsutoshi Satō	Ayumu Hisao	Mitsutoshi Satō	March 24, 2022
Ryang-ha, a university student, looked after Song for a week while waiting for Lizst. As Song was about to leave, Ryang-ha got a call from Lizst begging him to find something Lizst hid. Lizst was then shot while still on the phone by Seung-woo, who was furious the girl he was looking for was not there. Song helped Ryang-ha and they found a young girl asleep hidden in a suitcase. Stealing a car, they drove away, unsure what to do with her. She woke up, crying, but managed to say she was Chateau Nobel. Realizing she was Lizst's daughter, Ryang-ha decided to take responsibility over her. Breaking into a cabin for the night, Song decided to leave. For a moment, Ryang-ha was uncertain if he should kill Song to keep his whereabouts secret, but let him leave. On the road, Song met the surviving child traffickers who wanted revenge and chased Song into the woods. Ryang-ha guiltily decided to bring Song back, leaving Chateau sleeping and also leaving his gun. Unable to find Song, Ryang-ha returned to the cabin where Chateau, having woken up scared and alone, hid in the closet with Ryang-ha's gun, and when he tried to open the door, she shot him. Adult Chateau, having remembered all this, collapses in Song's arms.
12	"My Name"	Motohiko Niwa	Ayumu Hisao	Hiroaki Yoshikawa	March 31, 2022
The trafficker beat Song badly but Song managed to kill him. Ryang-ha was shot in the neck but initially survived and escaped in the car with Chateau. Song passed out, waking up in hospital a week later where a police detective, presumably Officer Dankworth, Chateau's future adoptive father, informed Song that Ryang-ha died after getting Chateau to safety. Devastated, Song took Ryang-ha's name as his own. In the present, Song brings Chateau to another of his safe houses where she is so exhausted after remembering everything she sleeps for two days. After waking, she is furious that Song knew everything the whole time without telling her and yet finally understands why she never once properly rejected Song, because deep in her mind she had recognized Ryang-ha's name and could not bring herself to reject the man she accidentally killed. Donny meets with the head of the Nobel family and Nikka takes Jim hostage while Euripedes manages to keep Chateau's mother safe. Chateau attempts to hire Song to assassinate Donny but he tells her she will have to work with him as an equal, which she happily accepts, but is confused when he refuses money and tells her to work out what he really wants as payment.
