= Classic Stars =

Japanese mixed-media project

- Anime key visual

クラシック★スターズ (Kurashikku Sutāzu)
- Genre: Music
- Created by: King Records; Unison; Broccoli
- Anime television series
- Directed by: Hideaki Ōba
- Written by: Shingo Nagai
- Music by: Hitoshi Fujima; Ryōta Tomaru; Yūsuke Takeda
- Studio: Platinum Vision
- Licensed by: Crunchyroll
- Original network: Tokyo MX, BS11, HBC, Animax
- Original run: April 6, 2025 – June 29, 2025
- Episodes: 13

Classic Stars (クラシック★スターズ, Kurashikku Sutāzu) is a Japanese music-themed mixed-media project featuring "classical musicians of history" created by King Records, Unison and Broccoli that began in 2018. An anime television series produced by Platinum Vision aired from April to June 2025.

== Characters ==
Beethoven (ベートーヴェン, Bētōven)
Voiced by: Yuma Uchida
Mozart (モーツァルト, Mōtsaruto)
Voiced by: Kent Itō
Chopin (ショパン, Shopan)
Voiced by: Shun Abe
Liszt (リスト, Risuto)
Voiced by: Shōya Ishige
Lost Beethoven (ロスト・ベートーヴェン, Rosuto Bētōvuen)
Voiced by: Taku Yashiro
Lost Vivaldi (ロスト・ヴィヴァルディ, Rosuto Vivarudi)
Voiced by: Takuya Satō
Lost Schumann (ロスト・シューマン, Rosuto Shūman)
Voiced by: Ayumu Murase
Ao Miharagi (三原木 逢生, Miharagi Ao)
Voiced by: Daisuke Namikawa

== Other media ==
=== Anime ===
An anime television series was announced on July 1, 2024. It is produced by Platinum Vision and directed by Hideaki Ōba, with Shingo Nagai overseeing series scripts, Yuki Shizuku designing the characters based on Tomoko Yoshida from Unison's original designs, Noriyasu Agematsu from Elements Garden serving as the music producer, and Hitoshi Fujima, Ryōta Tomaru, and Yūsuke Takeda from Elements Garden composing the music at King Records. The series premiered on April 6, 2025, on Tokyo MX and other networks. (Note: Tokyo MX and BS11 listed the series premiere on April 5, 2025, at 25:00, which is effectively April 6 at 1:00 a.m. JST.) The opening theme song is "Singularist" (シンギュラリスト), performed by Yuma Uchida, while the ending theme song is "BEYOND★CLASSIC", performed by Gran★MyStar (consisting of Uchida, Itō, Abe and Ishige). Crunchyroll streamed the series.

==== Episodes ====
| No. | Title | Directed by (Note: Production staff information is taken from the ending credits of each episode.) | Written by | Storyboarded by | Original release date |
|---|---|---|---|---|---|
| 1 | "For My Own Soul"; Transliteration: "Jibun no Tamashī no Tame ni" (Japanese: 自分の魂のために) | Hideaki Ōba | Shingo Nagai | Hideaki Ōba | April 6, 2025 |
| 2 | "Nachtmusik Will Change Into Wings"; Transliteration: "Nahatomujīku wa Tsubasa ni Kaeru" (Japanese: ナハトムジークは翼に変える) | Hideaki Ōba | Shingo Nagai | Hideaki Ōba | April 13, 2025 |
| 3 | "Reality Through The Filtered Lens"; Transliteration: "Renzugoshi no Riaru" (Japanese: レンズ越しのリアル) | Motohiko Niwa | Shingo Nagai; Yuki Enatsu | Motohiko Niwa | April 20, 2025 |
| 4 | "Tonight, Enjoy a Playful Dream"; Transliteration: "Koyoi wa Yume no Tawamure o" (Japanese: 今宵は夢の戯れを) | Nobutaka Chikahashi | Shingo Nagai; Yuki Enatsu | Hiroaki Yoshikawa | April 27, 2025 |
| 5 | "Howl. Sing. Create"; Transliteration: "Hoe Utae Tsukure" (Japanese: 吠え歌え創れ) | Hideaki Ōba | Akifumi Kaneko | Hideaki Ōba | May 4, 2025 |
| 6 | "The First Star" | Hideaki Ōba | Yuki Enatsu | Hideaki Ōba | May 11, 2025 |
| 7 | "Acceptance of the Heart"; Transliteration: "Kokoro, Aruga Mama" (Japanese: 心、あるがまま) | Motohiko Niwa | Yuki Enatsu; Shingo Nagai | Hiroaki Yoshikawa | May 18, 2025 |
| 8 | "Love is Freedom" | Hideaki Ōba | Yuki Enatsu | Hideaki Ōba | May 25, 2025 |
| 9 | "A Rough Nightmare"; Transliteration: "Zara Tsuita Nightmare" (Japanese: ザラついた Nightmare) | Motohiko Niwa | Yuki Enatsu | Motohiko Niwa | June 1, 2025 |
| 10 | "An Irreversible Note"; Transliteration: "Fukyagakuna Onpu -Note-" (Japanese: 不可逆な音符-Note-) | Motohiko Niwa | Akifumi Kaneko | Motohiko Niwa | June 8, 2025 |
| 11 | "Light Up the Love for Music in This Beat"; Transliteration: "Ongaku -Koi- no Beat o Tomose" (Japanese: 音楽-恋-の Beat を灯せ) | Hideaki Ōba | Akifumi Kaneko | Hideaki Ōba | June 15, 2025 |
| 12 | "One to Place Judgment"; Transliteration: "Tettsui -Jajjimento- o" (Japanese: 鉄槌-ジャッジメント-を) | Motohiko Niwa | Yuki Enatsu; Shingo Nagai | Motohiko Niwa | June 22, 2025 |
| 13 | "Stars Melody" | Hideaki Ōba | Shingo Nagai | Hideaki Ōba | June 29, 2025 |
