= Kono Oto Tomare! Sounds of Life =

Japanese manga and anime series

- Volume 1 cover

この音とまれ!
- Genre: Music, slice of life
- Manga
- Written by: Amyu
- Published by: Shueisha
- Imprint: Jump Comics SQ.
- Magazine: Jump Square
- Original run: August 4, 2012 – present
- Volumes: 34
- Anime television series
- Directed by: Ryōma Mizuno (Note: Director Hideaki Ooba served as a Direction Advisor (ディレクションアドバイザー) to Mizuno on the series.)
- Produced by: Ikumi Koga; Kisara Takahashi
- Written by: Ayumu Hisao
- Music by: Kei Haneoka
- Studio: Platinum Vision
- Licensed by: Crunchyroll (streaming); SA/SEA: Medialink
- Original network: Tokyo MX, BS11, AT-X, GYT, Wowow, HTB
- Original run: April 6, 2019 – December 28, 2019
- Episodes: 26
- icon

Kono Oto Tomare! Sounds of Life (Japanese: この音とまれ!; "Gather Around This Sound!") is a Japanese manga series written and illustrated by Amyu. The series began publication in Shueisha's Jump Square magazine in August 2012. It has been reported that over 7.5 million copies of the manga have been sold. An anime television series adaptation produced by Platinum Vision aired from April to December 2019.

== Plot ==
The story focuses on the koto club of Tokise High School in Kanagawa Prefecture. Takezo Kurata, in his second year, is the only member left in the koto club, after all the senior members have graduated. While he is trying his best to recruit more members into the club, Chika Kudo submits his application. However, Takezo is against the idea as Kudo has a reputation as a delinquent, and rumors say he was responsible for the destruction of his grandfather's own koto workshop. Things change when he discovers the truth behind the workshop's destruction and Kudo's resolve to honor his past. Also joining the club is the koto prodigy, Satowa Hozuki, who has her own agenda. Over time, more members join the club, each with their own reasons for playing. Eventually, they come to share a common goal – to play at the Koto Nationals competition.

== Characters ==
=== Tokise Koto Club ===
==== Students ====
Chika Kudo (久遠 愛)
Voiced by: Yūki Ono (vomic), Yuma Uchida (anime) (Japanese); Daman Mills (English) (anime)
Kudo, fondly called by his first name by most of his friends, has a very childish personality. He is straightforward with his words, but does not clearly know how to express himself or understand others, since he has not had many friends, spending most of his younger years being a delinquent. He changes his attitude because of his grandfather, and develops an interest towards the koto because of him. He feels like he needs to be responsible but he learns to understand what his grandfather said to him in his middle school year. He likes to help out his friends, but becomes shy when they thank him.
Although he starts with basically no knowledge about the koto, he is able to learn playing pretty quickly. He even has the ability to learn to play right after seeing someone else (for example, Satowa) playing it a few times. After learning that Satowa is a genius, he makes reaching her level (as a rival) his goal. He later develops a crush on her but does not understand his own feelings, leading to him wondering why he feels the urge to touch or embrace her. He has an earnest and diligent attitude when playing the koto and it seems to flow into his music too.
Chika currently stays with his aunt, Isaki. The one who understands him the most is his friend, Takaoka.
Takezo Kurata (倉田 武蔵)
Voiced by: Ryota Osaka (vomic), Junya Enoki (anime) (Japanese); Alejandro Saab (English) (anime)
The president of the koto club; settling into the role since there are no other senior members left after all his seniors graduated. He is also relatively new to the koto, and initially feels the pressure of being the president, but calms down once he knows that he has the help and support from all the other members of the club.
Initially, his personality was like that of a coward, and someone who lacked confidence, no matter what he did. This changes later, and he becomes quite the dependable senior and president. Mostly, he has a serious personality, and approaches everything he does earnestly.
He has a crush on Kurusu, who reciprocates the feeling, even though they have not confessed to each other, being completely unaware of the other's feelings.
Satowa Hozuki (鳳月 さとわ)
Voiced by: Atsumi Tanezaki (Japanese); Amber Lee Connors (English) (anime)
A prodigious koto player. Initially, she shows off a stuck up attitude, but very easily settles down and becomes an integral part of the koto club. Since the other members have practically no professional knowledge of the koto, she becomes somewhat of a teacher to them. This role is subdued after Doujima starts teaching her.
As a professional player, Satowa can play almost any of the types of koto easily. A hard worker by nature, she tries to understand the 'meaning' of the song to understand its nature, to play it better. Although she started teaching the other members of the club, she herself admits that teaching is not her thing. She sometimes becomes unable to teach/explain concepts because playing comes most naturally to her, and she finds explaining/correcting difficult.
When she started at Tokise, she was already estranged from her mother and the Hōzuki group. Estranged from her mother, who was losing herself under the stress of managing the Hōzuki group, Satowa tried to call out for her through her music. But this ended up in her excommunication from the group and abandonment by her mother. This breaks Satowa's heart. However, later, with everyone's support she is able to make amends with her mother after she watches her performance at the National Preliminaries. She is also officially reinstated as the heir of the Hōzuki group.
She later has a crush on Kudo, but tries hard not to show or acknowledge it, until the end.
Hiro Kurusu (来栖 妃呂)
Voiced by: Sara Matsumoto (Japanese); Alexis Tipton (English)
Kurusu is in the same grade and class as Kurata who, along with the whole Tokise High School, watches the koto club's morning assembly performance. After the performance, Kurusu approaches Takezo Kurata who is in the same class as her, and expresses her intent to join their club, in which he accepts her application and introduces her to the club.
Her initial motivations for joining the club are ill-intentioned, but she comes to regret her attempts to drive a wedge between its members. She later becomes the vice-president of the koto club after witnessing the burden that Kurata has to bear as president.

Saneyasu Adachi (足立 実康)

Voiced by: Haruki Ishiya (Japanese); Austin Tindle (English)
A former delinquent. As he progresses with the koto, he begins playing the 17-string bass more often. His seeming lack of ability compared to others in the club initially causes him great concern.
Michitaka Sakai (堺 通孝)
Voiced by: Makoto Furukawa (Japanese); Anthony Bowling (English)
A former delinquent. Issues with his home life begin to impact his ability to practice, forcing him to make tough decisions regarding his parts in the ensemble.
Kota Mizuhara (水原 光太)
Voiced by: Yūichi Iguchi (Japanese); Jessie James Grelle (English)
A former delinquent. Early on, he struggles with rhythm, causing him to sneak in extra practice time in inopportune situations.

==== Teachers ====
Suzuka Takinami (滝浪 涼香)

Voiced by: Daisuke Namikawa (Japanese); Brandon Potter (English)
A math teacher at Tokise High and the koto club's advisor. Initially he feigned ignorance of his musical background, though it is later revealed that his parents are world renowned musicians. As a child, he had no interest in playing music whatsoever other than listening to it. When he was seven, his father discovered his talent for writing musical scores and quickly took upon him to brand his son as a child prodigy. Because of this, Suzuka began to disdain music but his interest is rekindled after becoming the advisor for the koto club. He often writes pieces for the club as well as gives practice advice, while leaving the actual koto-teaching to Akira.

Akira Dōjima (堂島 晶)

Voiced by: Nao Tōyama (Japanese); Caitlin Glass (English)
The apparent heir to the Tsubaki School. She became the heir after the death of her parents, causing her older brother to drop out of college and attempt to find a job in order to support her and their grandmother. In her childhood, her brother was a renowned koto player and inspired Akira to pick it up. After her brother had also quit the koto, Akira was forced to become better at playing the koto and became the face of their group. For malicious reasons, she became Tokise High's koto instructor, but later officially took up the position after realizing the club's genuine intent to play the koto.

=== Supporting characters ===
Tetsuki Takaoka (高岡 哲生)

Voiced by: Yoshimasa Hosoya (Japanese); Robert McCollum (English)
Kudo's friend from before the series started. He is good at studying, cooking and at fighting too. He is the one who understands Kudo the most. He also explained Kudo's situation to Takezo when he wanted to join the koto club. Kudo hangs out at his place, even when he is feeling off, making him feed him. He also ends up being Kudo and his other friends' cram teacher when exams are due.
Gen Kudo (久遠源)
Voiced by: Tetsuo Kanao (Japanese); Charlie Campbell (English)
Kudo's grandfather who passes away before the events of the series.
Takeru Kurata (倉田武流)
Voiced by: Natsuki Hanae (Japanese); Ricco Fajardo (English)
Takezo's younger brother. He appears apathetic, almost antagonistic, to the activities of his brother.
Mashiro (真白)
Voiced by: Ayaka Asai (Japanese); Felecia Angelle (English)

Mio Kanzaki (神崎 澪)

Voiced by: Shouta Aoi (Japanese); Christopher Wehkamp (English)
Isaki Kudo (久遠 衣咲)
Voiced by: Nana Mizuki (Japanese); Lydia Mackay (English)
Shizune Nishina (仁科 静音, Nishina Shizune)
Voiced by: Masako Isobe (Japanese); Linda Leonard (English)
Kazusa Ōtori (凰かずさ)
Voiced by: Ayane Sakura (Japanese); Meg McClain (English)
Fumi Hanamura (花村 史)
Voiced by: Chika Anzai (Japanese); Dani Chambers (English)
Ōsuke Kiryū (桐生桜介)
Voiced by: Junta Terashima (Japanese); Matt Shipman (English)
Sentarō Miya (宮 千太朗)
Voiced by: Sōichirō Hoshi (Japanese); Howard Wang (English)
Haru Kasugai (春日井 晴)
Voiced by: Yoshitaka Yamaya (Japanese); Stephen Fu (English)
Uta Suzumori (鈴森 詩)
Asano Izumi (泉 朝乃)

== Production ==
Born into a family with a mother who was a koto teacher and a sister who was a professional koto player, Amyu first started playing the koto at 3 years of age. When Amyu was in elementary school, she aspired to be a manga artist, and eventually had hopes to draw a manga using koto as its theme.

Afterwards, Amyu debuted as a manga artist with her koto-themed one-shot manga. Thereafter, she spent her days announcing one-shots in Shueisha's shōjo manga magazine, Ribon. At the time, although Amyu had the thoughts of having her first serialization to be a koto manga, she did not get a good response from Ribon's chief editor, deciding to ultimately leave Ribon. While bringing it to other editorial departments, she met an editor for Jump Square, leading to the creation of this current work.

In addition, according to Amyu, originally Satowa was meant to be the main character, but it was pointed out that she had too gloomy of a personality, so in response, it was changed to the current main characters, Chika and Takezo.

== Characteristics ==
=== Style ===
This work is set in the koto club as a youth group drama, detailing the joys and struggles of boys and girls. Amyu expressed that rather than the focus of the manga being on the koto, she carefully wrote it around the idea of "a youth group drama".

As mentioned above, Amyu has had experience with the koto since childhood, with her experience reflected in the work. As an example, the accuracy of the positioning of the koto pillars, as well as the characters' troubles regarding the koto being from a part of Amyu's personal experiences. On the other hand, due to playing the koto at a young age, Amyu says that they did not understand as much the difficulties that beginners may have in learning the koto. To counter this, Amyu deliberately requested for her chief editor not to study the koto and she asked advice from her mother and sister, who have koto teaching experience.

=== Original koto music pieces ===
As mentioned above, this work contains various koto pieces, including original koto music. As of this current time, original koto pieces featured in this work include the piece performed by the Tokise High School Koto Club in front of the student body to save the club "Ryūseigun", the piece performed by the Tokise High School Koto Club in the Kanto Music Festival "Kuon", the piece performed by the Hakuto High School Koto Club in the Kanagawa Preliminaries "Katakago", the piece performed by the Tokise High School Koto Club at the Kanagawa Preliminaries "Tenkyu". These 4 pieces are all made by Amyu's family members.

- Ryūseigun - Amyu's older sister
- Kuon - Amyu's mother
- Katakago - Amyu's mother
- Tenkyu - Amyu's older sister

To commemorate the release of the 5th volume, a video of "Ryūseigun" performed by koto players was released. Afterwards, the sheet music was made available alongside the release of the 6th volume. Similarly, with the release of the 7th volume, a video of "Kuon" performed by koto players were released.

== Media ==
=== Manga ===
Written and illustrated by Amyu, Kono Oto Tomare began publication in Shueisha's monthly shōnen manga magazine Jump Square on August 4, 2012. The series is set to end in three chapters. As of June 2026, it has been compiled into 34 tankōbon volumes.

==== Volume list ====
No.	Release date	ISBN
1	November 2, 2012	978-4-08-870545-3
Chapter 1: Shinnyuu Buin (新入部員); Chapter 2: Shikaku no Arika (資格の在処); Chapter 3: Bokura no Nyuubu Douki (僕らの入部動機)
2	March 4, 2013	978-4-08-870639-9
Chapter 4: Shinsei Soukyoku-bu Shidou (新生箏曲部始動); Chapter 5: Dekinai Koto (出来ないこと); Chapter 6: Hajimete no Hibiki (初めての響き); Chapter 7: Sorezore no Omoi (それぞれの想い)
3	July 4, 2013	978-4-08-870775-4
Chapter 8: Hibiki Todoke Bokura no Oto (響き届け 僕らの音); Chapter 9: Oto no Yukue (音の行方); Chapter 10: Mienai Kyōkai-sen (見えない境界線); Chapter 11: Shirarezaru Oto no Ha (知られざる音の葉)
4	November 1, 2013	978-4-08-870845-4
Chapter 12: Hontou no Riyuu (本当の理由); Chapter 13: Koko kara (ここから); Chapter 14: Michishirube (みちしるべ); Chapter 15: Mukai Kaze (向かい風)
5	April 4, 2014	978-4-08-880034-9
Chapter 16: Tsukisasaru Koto no Ne (突き刺さる言の音); Chapter 17: Kotae (答え); Chapter 18: Suteppu (ステップ); Chapter 19: Chikakute Tooi Kyori (近くて遠い距離)
6	July 4, 2014	978-4-08-880142-1
Chapter 20: Tonari (となり); Chapter 21: Sagashiteta Oto (探してた音); Chapter 22: Kantou Hougaku-sai Kaimuku (関東邦楽祭開幕); Chapter 23: Kiryuu Ousuke (桐生桜介)
7	November 4, 2014	978-4-08-880142-1
Chapter 24: Raibaru (ライバル); Chapter 25: Ketsudan (決断); Chapter 26: Kuon (久遠); Chapter 27: Hikari no Oto (光の音)
8	March 4, 2015	978-4-08-880320-3
Chapter 28: Ippo Mae e (一歩前へ); Chapter 29: Kizuki (きづき); Chapter 30: Yuruginai mono (ゆるぎないもの); Chapter 31: Futari no Jikan (二人の時間)
9	July 3, 2015	978-4-08-880431-6
Chapter 32: Oto no Shinjitsu (音の真実); Chapter 33: Saikai (再会); Chapter 34: Kage (陰); Chapter 35: Sorezore no Ketsui (それぞれの決意)
10	November 4, 2015	978-4-08-880508-5
Chapter 36: Tada no Ichido mo (ただの一度も); Chapter 37: Doujima Akira (堂島晶); Chapter 38: Taiji (対峙); Chapter 39: Seishun-ryoku (青春力)
11	March 4, 2016	978-4-08-880636-5
Chapter 40: Mou ichido (もう一度); Chapter 41: Imi to Yakuwari (意味と役割); Chapter 42: Itsuka (いつか); Chapter 43: Kessen no Asa (決戦の朝)
12	July 4, 2016	978-4-08-880730-0
Chapter 44: Zenkoku Yosen Kaimaku! (全国予選開幕！); Chapter 45: Ōja no Kakugo (王者の覚悟); Chapter 46: Mittsu no Parafurēzu (三つのパラフレーズ); Chapter 47: Seishun wa Hohoemanai (青春は微笑まない)
13	November 3, 2016	978-4-08-880813-0
Chapter 48: Suugaku no Oto (数学のおと); Chapter 49: Seikai no Sono Saki (正解のその先); Chapter 50: Satowa no Oto (さとわの音); Chapter 51: Ongaku no Honshitsu (音楽の本質)
14	March 3, 2017	978-4-08-881029-4
Chapter 52: Tenkyu (天泣); Chapter 53: 1/14; Chapter 54: Sutāto Rain (スタートライン); Chapter 55: Natsukashī Ondo (懐かしい温度)
15	July 4, 2017	978-4-08-881126-0
Chapter 56: Aoi Ito (青い糸); Chapter 57: Howaito Kurisumasu Ibu (ホワイトクリスマスイブ); Chapter 58: New Year; Chapter 59: Present
16	December 4, 2017	978-4-08-881168-0
Chapter 60: Atarashī Kaze (新しい風); Chapter 61: Futari no Jitsuryoku (二人の実力); Chapter 62: Kōhai (後輩); Chapter 63: Senpai (先輩)
17	April 4, 2018	978-4-08-881389-9
Chapter 64: Shinfonī Burū (シンフォニーブルー); Chapter 65: Sorezore no Rokudan (それぞれの六ろく段だん); Chapter 66: Fill In; Chapter 67: Mimi Moto no Hon'ne (耳もとの本音)
18	August 3, 2018	978-4-08-881475-9
Chapter 68: Otokogokoro (オトコゴコロ); Chapter 69: Ichirinka (一凛花); Chapter 70: I
19	December 4, 2018	978-4-08-881389-9
Chapter 71: Gasshuku no Makuake (合宿の幕開け); Chapter 72: Teitai Zensen (停滞前線); Chapter 73: Gurīn Furasshu (グリーンフラッシュ); Chapter 74: Yada (やだ)
20	April 4, 2019	978-4-08-881810-8
Chapter 75: Ichiei Kōtō Gakkō (一英高等学校); Chapter 76: restart; Chapter 77: Intorodakushon (イントロダクション); One-shot: 5x100
21	October 4, 2019	978-4-08-881810-8
Chapter 78: Wakaremichi (Zenpen) (分かれ道(前編)); Chapter 79: Wakaremichi (Kōhen) (分かれ道(後編)); Chapter 80: Hitori to Hitori (ひとりと独り); Chapter 81: Mōhitotsu no sentakushi (もう一つの選択肢); Chapter 82: Burū Mōmento (ブルーモーメント); Chapter 83: Daijinishiteta Koto (大事にしてたこと)
22	April 3, 2020	978-4-08-882263-1
Chapter 84: Ame Nochi Emi (雨のち笑み); Chapter 85: Nemureru Shishi (眠れる獅子); Chapter 86: Aratanaru Michi (新たなる道); Chapter 87: Otonaki Inazuma (音なき稲妻); Chapter 88: Tokise no Oto (時瀬の音); Chapter 89: Tōshindai Nōto (等身大ノート)
23	October 2, 2020	978-4-08-882444-4
Chapter 90: Yureru, Ao (揺れる、青); Chapter 91: Yakusoku (約束); Chapter 92: Asanagini, Hikari (朝和ぎに、光); Chapter 93: Kigakari na Ko (気がかりな子); Chapter 94: Kawari Yuku (変わりゆく); Chapter 95: Diminisshu Kōdo (ディミニッシュコード)
24	April 2, 2021	978-4-08-882602-8
Chapter 96: Mezame (めざめ); Chapter 97: Īssu yo (いいっすよ); Chapter 98: 7pm in July; Chapter 99: Nijumu, Kuro (滲む、黒); Chapter 100: Rabu retā (ラブレター); Ex.: blue x blue
25	October 4, 2021	978-4-08-882772-8
Chapter 101: Hanasanai, hanasanai (離さない、放さない); Chapter 102: Senpai to Senpai (先輩と先輩); Chapter 103: Doradarake no junshin (泥だらけの純真); Chapter 104: Chikai (誓い); Chapter 105: Chika (愛)
26	March 4, 2022	978-4-08-883055-1
Chapter 106: Ai (愛); Chapter 107: Tsuki to taiyō (月と太陽); Chapter 108: I; Chapter 109: Yoake no Kotoba (夜明けの言葉); Chapter 110: Ai (和)
27	September 2, 2022	978-4-08-883232-6
Chapter 111: Zangetsu (残月); Chapter 112: Kessen no chi e (決戦の地へ); Chapter 113: Kizuato (キズアト); Chapter 114: "daijōbu" no riyū (大丈夫の理由); Chapter 115: Kaimaku (開幕)
28	February 3, 2023	978-4-08-883377-4
Chapter 116: Meiryou no sentaku (明陵の選択); Chapter 117: kanpeki no jōken (完璧の条件); Chapter 118: Kapuritchio (カプリッチオ); Chapter 119: Tōmawari no saki ni (遠回りの先に); Chapter 120: Aniki (兄貴)
29	August 4, 2023	978-4-08-883574-7
Chapter 121: Kobayakawa Akari (小早川明里); Chapter 122: Manatsu no shiren (真夏の試練); Chapter 123: Akashi (証); Chapter 124: Muchi ni ame (無知に飴); Chapter 125: Chibana no uta (智華のうた)
30	February 2, 2024	978-4-08-883832-8
Chapter 126: Sensei (先生); Chapter 127: Dear; Chapter 128: Nibiiro no ashioto (鈍色の足音); Chapter 129: Shinka no daishō (進化の代償)
31	August 2, 2024	978-4-08-884088-8
Chapter 130: Saotome Miran (早乙女女美蘭); Chapter 131: My Story; Chapter 132: Watashi tachi no, wa nashi (わたしたちの、はなし); Chapter 133: Shishi tachi no mezame (獅子たちのめざめ); Chapter 134: Ajara (戯); Chapter 135: Seresuto burū (セレストブルー)
32	March 4, 2025	978-4-08-884332-2
Chapter 136: Kokuhaku (告白); Chapter 137: Rasuto pīsu (ラストピース); Chapter 138: Tokise Kōkō Sōkyoku-bu (時瀬高校箏曲部); Chapter 139: I-; Chapter 140: -Ai (-和)
33	October 3, 2025	978-4-08-884618-7
Chapter 141: Waon (わをん); Chapter 142: Hajimari no oto (始まりの音); Chapter 143: Aoki ketsui (青き決意); Chapter 144: answer; Chapter 145: Saisho no futari (最初の二人); Chapter 146: Pīsu (ピース)
34	June 4, 2026	978-4-08-885004-7
Chapter 147: Home (ホーム, Hōmu); Chapter 148: Tadaima, okaeri (ただいま、おかえり); Chapter 149: Kazoku no katachi (家族のかたち); Chapter 150: Michiru (満ちる); Chapter 151: Afureru (あふれる); Chapter 152: Kono yubi tomare! (この指とまれ！)

=== Anime ===
An anime television series adaptation aired in two parts from April 6 to June 29, 2019, and October 5 to December 28, 2019, on Tokyo MX, BS11, AT-X, GYT, Wowow, and HTB. The series is animated by Platinum Vision and was directed by Ryōma Mizuno, with Ayumu Hisao handling series composition, and Junko Yamanaka designing the characters. Shouta Aoi performed the series' opening theme song "Tone", while Yuma Uchida performed the series' ending theme song "Speechless". Aoi also performed the series' second opening theme song "Harmony", while Uchida also performed the series' ending theme song "Rainbow". Funimation has licensed the series, and released the dub as it aired.

No.	Title (Note: All English titles are taken from Funimation.)	Original release date
Part 1
1	"New Club Members"; Transliteration: "Shinnyū buin" (Japanese: 新入部員)	April 6, 2019
2	"Having What It Takes"; Transliteration: "Shikaku no Arika" (Japanese: 資格の在処)	April 13, 2019
3	"The Koto Club Reborn"; Transliteration: "Shinsei sōkyokubu shidō" (Japanese: 新生箏曲部始動)	April 20, 2019
4	"The First Resounding Note"; Transliteration: "Hajimete no Hibiki" (Japanese: 初めての響き)	April 27, 2019
5	"Let Our Sound Resound and Reach Them"; Transliteration: "Hibiki todoke Bokura no Oto" (Japanese: 響き届け 僕らの音)	May 4, 2019
6	"An Invisible Boundary"; Transliteration: "Mienai kyōkaisen" (Japanese: 見えない境界線)	May 11, 2019
7	"Unknown Sounds"; Transliteration: "Shirarezaru oto no Ha" (Japanese: 知られざる音の葉)	May 18, 2019
8	"A Sign"; Transliteration: "Michishirube" (Japanese: みちしるべ)	May 25, 2019
9	"A Piercing Sound"; Transliteration: "Tsukisasaru gen no Oto" (Japanese: 突き刺さる言の音)	June 1, 2019
10	"Near Yet Far"; Transliteration: "Chikakute tōi kyori" (Japanese: 近くて遠い距離)	June 8, 2019
11	"The Sound We Are Searching For"; Transliteration: "Sagashiteta oto" (Japanese: 探してた音)	June 15, 2019
12	"Rivals"; Transliteration: "Raibaru" (Japanese: ライバル)	June 22, 2019
13	"Kuon"; Transliteration: "Kuon" (Japanese: 久遠)	June 29, 2019
Part 2
14	"A Step Forward"; Transliteration: "Ippo mae e" (Japanese: 一歩前へ)	October 5, 2019
15	"Becoming Aware"; Transliteration: "Kizuki" (Japanese: きづき)	October 12, 2019
16	"Their Time"; Transliteration: "Futari no Jikan" (Japanese: 二人の時間)	October 19, 2019
17	"Reunion"; Transliteration: "Saikai" (Japanese: 再会)	October 26, 2019
18	"Their Determination"; Transliteration: "Sorezore no Ketsui" (Japanese: それぞれの決意)	November 2, 2019
19	"Confrontation"; Transliteration: "Taiji" (Japanese: 対峙)	November 9, 2019
20	"Another Chance"; Transliteration: "Mōichido" (Japanese: もう一度)	November 16, 2019
21	"Meaning and Role"; Transliteration: "Imi to yakuwari" (Japanese: 意味と役割)	November 23, 2019
22	"Morning of the Showdown"; Transliteration: "Kessen no Asa" (Japanese: 決戦の朝)	November 30, 2019
23	"Champions' Resolve"; Transliteration: "Oja no Kakugo" (Japanese: 王者の覚悟)	December 7, 2019
24	"Beyond the Right Answer"; Transliteration: "Seikai no Sonosaki" (Japanese: 正解のその先)	December 14, 2019
25	"Tenkyu"; Transliteration: "Tenkyū" (Japanese: 天泣)	December 21, 2019
26	"Starting Line"; Transliteration: "Sutātorain" (Japanese: スタートライン)	December 28, 2019

=== Stage play ===
A stage play adaptation ran in 2019 in three locations: August 17–25 in Tokyo, September 7–8 in Fukuoka, and September 14–15 in Osaka. The play starred Takuma Zaiki as Kudo, Kazuki Furuta as Kurata, Hinako Tanaka as Satowa, Kouhei Shiota as Adachi, Kotori Kojima as Sakai, and Tatsuki Jōnin as Mizuhara. In preparation for the play, the cast members trained for four months to learn how to play the koto.

== Reception ==
As of October 2021, the series had surpassed 5.5 million copies in circulation. Particularly, the amount of junior high school and high school student readers have been increasing, and there are junior high school students who have started learning the koto after reading this work.

In addition, the videos of the koto players performing the work's original pieces have been increasing in views, with "Ryūseigun" passing 1 million views on January 1, 2018.

On March 8, 2017, the album "Kono Oto Tomare! ~Tokise High School Koto Club" was released by King Records, receiving an Award of Excellence in the Records category at the 72nd National Arts Festival by the Agency for Cultural Affairs. It also won the Traditional Japanese Music Album of the Year Award at the 32rd Japan Gold Disc Awards.
