= Kunon the Sorcerer Can See =

Japanese light novel series

- First light novel volume cover, featuring Kunon Gurion

魔術師クノンは見えている (Majutsu-shi Kunon wa Mieteiru)
- Genre: High fantasy; Slice of life
- Novel series
- Written by: Umikaze Minamino
- Published by: Shōsetsuka ni Narō
- Original run: August 5, 2021 – present
- Light novel
- Written by: Umikaze Minamino
- Illustrated by: Laruha
- Published by: Fujimi Shobo
- English publisher: NA: Yen Press
- Imprint: Kadokawa Books
- Original run: March 10, 2022 – present
- Volumes: 9
- Manga
- Written by: Umikaze Minamino
- Illustrated by: La-na
- Published by: Media Factory
- English publisher: NA: Yen Press
- Imprint: MF Comics Alive
- Magazine: Monthly Comic Alive
- Original run: April 27, 2022 – present
- Volumes: 8
- Anime television series
- Directed by: Hideaki Ōba
- Written by: Yuki Enatsu
- Music by: Shunsuke Takizawa
- Studio: Platinum Vision
- Licensed by: Crunchyroll; SEA: Remow
- Original network: Tokyo MX, BS Asahi, WOWOW
- Original run: January 4, 2026 – March 29, 2026
- Episodes: 13
- icon

Kunon the Sorcerer Can See (Japanese: 魔術師クノンは見えている, Hepburn: Majutsu-shi Kunon wa Mieteiru) is a Japanese light novel series written by Umikaze Minamino and illustrated by Laruha. It began serialization on the user-generated novel publishing website Shōsetsuka ni Narō in August 2021. It was later acquired by Fujimi Shobo who began publishing it under its Kadokawa Books imprint in March 2022. A manga adaptation illustrated by La-na began serialization in Media Factory's seinen manga magazine Monthly Comic Alive in April 2022. An anime television series adaptation produced by Platinum Vision aired from January to March 2026.

== Plot ==
Born blind, Kunon Gurion is a young man who dreams of using water magic to create new eyes for himself, a feat that has never been accomplished. Despite his disability, Kunon demonstrates extraordinary talent, surpassing his mentor after just five months of study. Through his magic, he not only develops the ability to sense color, but also crafts practical items and even conjures living creatures. Kunon's growing reputation spreads to the royal court, where he earns the opportunity to study under the kingdom's most powerful magician. As he continues to refine his abilities, Kunon pushes the limits of water magic and gets ever closer to his seemingly impossible goal.

== Characters ==
Kunon Gurion (クノン・グリオン)
Voiced by: Saori Hayami
The main character. Due to being a descendant of the hero, he was born without sight. The hero defeated the Demon King, but at the cost of his arm and leg. As such, his descendants occasionally tend to be missing something, such as an arm, a leg, or even eyes. These people are said to have the "Hero's Scar." At first, Kunon was very gloomy and depressed due to this. However, he soon realised he could potentially master magic and create new eyes for himself to see the world and all of its beauties. As such, he takes an interest in magic, history, swordsmanship, and even etiquette (to be a gentleman for Mirika), all to improve his knowledge, stamina, strength, and magic capacity. He is for lack of a better term, a magic prodigy, mastering everything Jenie teaches him. He currently can sense colors to an extent, allowing him to grasp the world around him better and do things like read pictures in books. Likely due to an influence from Iko and his etiquette training, he tends to say weird things sometimes and doesn't know how to read the room. He also tends to get very serious and quite cunning when people insult him or the people he cares about.
Iko Round (イコ・ラウンド, Iko Raundo)
Voiced by: Maaya Uchida
A cheerful and eccentric maid who takes care of Kunon. She is very fond of him, and very happy that he isn't depressed anymore. She cares for him greatly, and admires his dedication to master magic. She tends to be very attached to money, constantly asking for raises. She can be quite weird and possessive, smothering Kunon with affection or complimenting Mirika in suspicious ways.
Mirika (ミリカ)
Voiced by: Akari Kitō
Kunon's fiance who is the princess of the kingdom. At first, she was reluctant to go see him again as he was always depressed. However, after seeing his new self, she becomes very fond of him, and enjoys listening to his stories about learning magic, among other things.
Jenie Kors (ジェニエ・コース, Jenie Kōsu)
Voiced by: Rikako Yamaguchi
Kunon's magic teacher. She initially thought her job would be easy money, teaching a child basic magic. However, he quickly mastered everything she taught him and more, much to her astonishment. Though this occasionally leaves her disheartened by how effortlessly he learns, she is still extremely proud of him.
Zeonly Finroll (ゼオンリー・フィンロール, Zeonrī Finrōru)
Voiced by: Nobunaga Shimazaki
Kunon's next magic teacher after Jenie and his "master." Zeonly is known as the strongest Royal Mage of the Hughlia Kingdom, an exceptionally powerful and confident prodigy in his youth who typically refuses to give others the time of day. His magic is of the Earth attribute. He initially declined to teach Kunon, only changing his mind after witnessing Kunon's magic and personality, with Kunon becoming the only person to ever give Zeonly a taste of his own attitude, much to everyone's amusement. Rather than providing traditional instruction, Zeonly mostly had Kunon organize his magic books, research, and theories while he slept. However, the quality of his work was so high that Kunon naturally absorbed advanced concepts and built strong fundamentals. He still stepped in when needed, including helping Kunon understand his "water eye" magic. After two years, he ended their apprenticeship and told Kunon to attend the Magic Academy, believing he could learn from stronger water mages there, even writing a recommendation boldly claiming Kunon would surpass everyone and become the next Cerulean Sorcerer. Despite his arrogance, Zeonly is deeply proud of Kunon and genuinely believes he will achieve the kingdom's highest honor. Outside of teaching, he is known for lazily sleeping while Kunon works, especially atop Kunon's "water pillows."

== Media ==
=== Light novel ===
Written by Umikaze Minamino, Kunon the Sorcerer Can See began serialization on the user-generated novel publishing website Shōsetsuka ni Narō on August 5, 2021. It was later acquired by Fujimi Shobo who began publishing it as a light novel with illustrations by Laruha under its Kadokawa Books imprint on March 10, 2022. Nine volumes have been released as of September 10, 2026. The series is licensed in English by Yen Press.

No.	Original release date	Original ISBN	North American release date	North American ISBN
1	March 10, 2022	978-4-04-074405-6	August 22, 2023	978-1-9753-6822-7
1. Prologue; 2. Chapter 1: "The Hero's Scar and the Boy Who Couldn't See"; 3. Chapter 2: "The World in Color"; 4. Chapter 3: "Two Years On"; 5. Chapter 4: "What Comes Next"; 6. Chapter 5: "On to the Royal Castle"; 7. Chapter 6: "A New Teacher"; 8. Chapter 7: "Kunon, the Sorcerer's Disciple, Can See...?"; 9. Chapter 8: "Twelfth Birthday"; 10. Epilogue; Extra: "Someone Else's Turning Point"
2	July 8, 2022	978-4-04-074583-1	January 23, 2024	978-1-9753-7658-1
1. Prologue; 2. Chapter 1: "To Magic School"; 3. Chapter 2: "From the Holy Kingdom to Dirashik"; 4. Chapter 3: "Challenging the Entrance Exam"; 5. Chapter 4: "Advanced Class Policies"; 6. Chapter 5: "The Saint's Money Troubles"; 7. Chapter 6: "Classmates"; 8. Chapter 7: "The Four Factions"; 9. Chapter 8: "The Fairy Escort"; 10. Chapter 9: "Comparing Answers"; 11. Chapter 10: "Concluding Negotiations"; 12. Epilogue; Extra: "The Path of a First-Year Student in the Knighthood Course from Spring to Summer"
3	December 9, 2022	978-4-04-074792-7	June 18, 2024	978-1-9753-9034-1
1. Prologue; 2. Chapter 1: "The Ability Faction Seniors"; 3. Chapter 2: "Experimenting with Aquatic Respiration Methods"; 4. Chapter 3: "An Experiment Driven by Greed"; 5. Chapter 4: "Reunion"; 6. Chapter 5: "The First Level Class and Broken Rules"; 7. Chapter 6: "The Second Level Class and Magic Duels"; 8. Chapter 7: "Water Sphere and Fire Butterfly"; 9. Chapter 8: "Anxiously Awaiting"; 10. Epilogue: "The Letter"; Extra: "A First-Year Knighthood Student, One Winter's Day"
4	May 10, 2023	978-4-04-074966-2	June 10, 2025	978-1-9753-9036-5
1. Prologue; 2. Chapter 1: "Long-Awaited Rendezvous"; 3. Interlude 1: "Letter"; 4. Interlude 2: "Witch's Musings, Prince's Musings"; 5. Chapter 2: "The Matter of Credits"; 6. Chapter 3: "Assembling the Magic-Containing Box Development Team"; 7. Chapter 4: "Lady Marionette's Homecoming"; 8. Chapter 5: "The Spell Vault"; 9. Chapter 6: "Kira Vera and Investigating the Forest"; 10. Chapter 7: "In Short, Misery"; 11. Epilogue: "Letter"; Extra: "A First-Year Knighthood Student, from Winter to Spring"
5	January 10, 2024	978-4-04-075287-7	February 10, 2026	979-8-8554-1843-9
1. Prologue; 2. Chapter 1: "A First-Year Lady from the Empier"; 3. Interlude 1: "An Encounter with Amethysts / An Encounter with Lightning"; 4. Chapter 2: "Keym Village"; 5. Interlude 2: "And the Conclusion"; 6. Chapter 3: "The Young Imperial Lady Goes Astray"; 7. Chapter 4: "The Hunt for the Divine Flower"; 8. Epilogue: "Letter"; Extra: "The Old Days with Zeonly and Aion"
6	August 9, 2024	978-4-04-075460-4	August 11, 2026	979-8-8554-2202-3
1. Prologue; 2. Chapter 1: "A First-Year's Income and Taboo Magic"; 3. Chapter 2: "A Busy Lady"; 4. Interlude 1: "Bizetar Quartz"; 5. Chapter 3: "Serraphila's First Magic Tool and a Visit from an Instructor"; 6. Epilogue: "Letter"; 7. Interlude 2: "The Harmony Faction Awaits Its Newest Member"; Extra: "The Old Days with Zeonly and Aion 2"
7	March 10, 2025	978-4-04-075852-7	April 13, 2027	979-8-8554-4477-3
8	December 10, 2025	978-4-04-076096-4	—	—
9	September 10, 2026	978-4-04-076558-7	—	—

=== Manga ===
A manga adaptation illustrated by La-na began serialization in Media Factory's seinen manga magazine Monthly Comic Alive on April 27, 2022. The manga's chapters have been compiled into eight tankōbon volumes of June 2026. The manga adaptation is also licensed in English by Yen Press.

No.	Original release date	Original ISBN	North American release date	North American ISBN
1	November 22, 2022	978-4-04-681878-2	August 26, 2025	979-8-8554-1475-2
1. "The Hero's Scar"; 2. "The World in Color"; 3. "Two Years On"; 4. "First Day of School"; 5. "The Nuisance"; 6. "Moving On"; 7. "On to the Royal Castle"
2	May 23, 2023	978-4-04-682543-8	March 24, 2026	979-8-8554-1476-9
8. "Let's Experiment"; 9. "A Special Boy"; 10. "A New Teacher"; 11. "Forgotten Ambition"; 12. "Trial and Error"; 13. "Departure"
3	November 22, 2023	978-4-04-683062-3	October 27, 2026	979-8-8554-1478-3
14. "A Parting and a Meeting"; 15. "Finding a House and Taking the Entrance Exam"; 16. "Practical Test"; 17. "Interview"; 18. "Admissions Guide"; 19. "The Saint's Money Problems"
4	May 23, 2024	978-4-04-683560-4	—	—
5	November 22, 2024	978-4-04-684126-1	—	—
6	May 22, 2025	978-4-04-684757-7	—	—
7	December 23, 2025	978-4-04-685450-6	—	—
8	June 23, 2026	978-4-04-660172-8	—	—
9	December 22, 2026	978-4-04-660685-3	—	—

=== Anime ===
An anime television series adaptation was announced on January 24, 2025, which is produced by Platinum Vision and directed by Hideaki Ōba, with series composition handled by Yuki Enatsu, characters designed by Yōko Satō and Toshimitsu Kobayashi, and music composed by Shunsuke Takizawa. The series aired from January 4 to March 29, 2026, on Tokyo MX and other networks. The opening theme song is "Rakenaria no Yume" (ラケナリアの夢; 'The Dream of Lachenalia'), performed by Isekaijoucho, while the ending theme song is "Story feat. katagiri", performed by Kohta Yamamoto. Crunchyroll currently streams the series, while Remow licensed it in Southeast Asia.

==== Episodes ====
No.	Title	Directed by (Note: Production staff information is taken from the ending credits of each episode.)	Written by	Storyboarded by	Original release date
1	"The World in Colors"; Transliteration: "Irodzuku Sekai" (Japanese: 色付く世界)	Unknown	Unknown	TBA	January 4, 2026
Kunon Gurion is born into a noble family where it is discovered his eyes bear the Hero's Scar, inherited from his ancestor Histor Hughlia, so he is completely blind and relies almost entirely on his maid Iko. As he was also born with the Water Crest his parents hire sorceress Jenie as his tutor who unwittingly inspires him to one day create magic eyes. He learns Histor defeated a demon lord but lost his limbs and since then his descendants are sometimes born missing body parts, in Kunon's case his eyesight. Lacking the stamina for powerful magic Iko suggest Kunon begin sword training with instructor Ouro. Princess Mirika is unhappy about her arranged engagement to Kunon, whom she considers gloomy. However, she finds his mood much improved now he is studying magic and even develops a crush on him. Jenie worries about her job as Kunon soon surpasses her, so she makes the risky decision to teach him Intermediate magic. While summoning hot water Kunon momentarily senses colors and begins learning to sense pictures and written words. Witnessing his progress Jenie wonders if one day Kunon might earn the kingdom's highest honor in magic by becoming the next Cerulean Sorcerer.
2	"To the School for Noble Children"; Transliteration: "Kizoku Gakkō e" (Japanese: 貴族学校へ)	Unknown	Unknown	TBA	January 11, 2026 (Note: From Episode 2, episodes are released on ABEMA and Crunchyroll a week before their televised airings.)
His father decides to send Kunon to a school for noble children to experience the outside world. His protective older brother Ixio swears to look after him at school. Kunon's etiquette instructor, Flora, worries others might see Kunon as shallow. Kunon would prefer not to attend school and focus on magic, but his father reminds him his actions reflect on his fiancée Mirika, and without attending school both their reputations would be damaged among the nobility. Due to his personal circumstances Kunon is only required to pass the five exams necessary to graduate. Their father reminds Ixio there may be enemies among the noble children. First time instructor Professor Kast is put in charge of showing Kunon the school and is surprised the gloomy, shy boy she was warned about is actually confident and charming, albeit slightly odd. Kunon sits and passes his first exam but is unhappy his father and his best friend, the King, pressured the school to give him preferential treatment. Prince Lyle, Mirika's older brother, publicly objects to her engagement to Kunon and tries to bully him. Kunon quietly uses magic to make it look like Lyle wet himself in public. Lyle leaves humiliated and Ixio fears he will retaliate but hopes he can get Kunon to graduate without any major incidents.
3	"Graduation, and What's Next?"; Transliteration: "Sotsugyō soshite Tsugi wa Dō suru" (Japanese: 卒業そして次はどうする)	Unknown	Unknown	TBA	January 18, 2026
Mirika explains as Kunon's fiancée, a sorcerer bearing the Hero's Scar, she has risen above Lyle in social status and he is jealous. On the day of the last exam Lyle barges in determined to cause trouble but is waylaid by Kunon who greets him as a future brother-in-law and flatters him outrageously. This causes Lyle to blush and the students to laugh. Confused but a lot calmer Lyle quietly sits his exam with everyone. The whole class passes and Kunon is returned home. Seeing Kunon can now summon water balls that mimic living animals Jenie is forced to admit she has nothing left to teach him. Kunon begs her to stay, but Jenie insists Kunon needs a real sorcerer for a tutor. As she leaves she decides to improve herself in case she and Kunon meet again. Flora also resigns as Kunon has no more need for etiquette lessons. Ixio suggests Royal Sorcerer Zeonly Finroll but their father reveals Royal Sorcerers only obey the King and only royal family members are allowed to contact them. Facing pressure from his wife, their father agrees to ask the King. The request reaches the head of the Royal Sorcerers who is outraged an upstart apprentice sorcerer would make such a request, until he realises the request came from Kunon, and leaps into action.
4	"Off to The Castle"; Transliteration: "Iza Ōjō e" (Japanese: いざ王城へ)	Unknown	Unknown	TBA	January 25, 2026
Kunon is summoned to the castle where Mirika's older sister Raysha, a Royal Sorcerer herself, greets him. She reveals there are seven princes and ten princesses and in most kingdoms the heir is the oldest prince, but in Hughlia Kingdom the heir can change based on personal achievements or public opinion. As Mirika's fiancé she warns Kunon not to thoughtlessly involve himself in the dispute over succession. Kunon causes trouble with Captain Darion by showing Raysha how to ice skate indoors. Grand Master Londimonde deduces Kunon has a common two-star water crest out of a possible five stars, similar to Raysha's two-star wind crest. Kunon realises despite their titles Royal Sorcerers are enthusiastic magic nerds who demand he show off spells he invented. All of them get in trouble with Darion when Kunon summons a water copy of Iko that is mistaken for a ghost and scares the royal maids. Londimonde agrees to assign Kunon a Royal Sorcerer as a tutor. Meanwhile, Kunon's father scolds him for upsetting Darion twice in one afternoon. Kunon and Raysha combine water and wind magic to get Kunon to his date with Mirika on time, but their crash landing gets them in trouble with Darion for the third time in a row.
5	"Quite A Boy and A New Master"; Transliteration: "Nakanakana Otoko no Ko to Aratana-shi" (Japanese: なかなかな男の子と新たな師)	Unknown	Unknown	TBA	February 1, 2026
Kunon takes Mirika on their first date outside the royal castle. He pays her so many compliments the servants start to believe he is an insincere flatterer, but Mirika enjoys it. Kunon is assigned Zeonly as his instructor, exciting Iko as Zeonly is rumoured to be handsome. Mirika is picked on by her sisters Everille and Lydalia, who mock Kunon for being scolded by Darion three times. As Zeonly needs royal permission to leave the castle Mirika goes with him to Kunon's home. Kunon senses Zeonly is obviously the most powerful Royal Sorcerer, along with being rude and resentful of being asked to tutor Kunon, whom he calls a brat. As a test Zeonly constructs a stone wall and asks Hunon to destroy it with magic. Kunon uses a spell he invented for washing clothes to soak the wall past it's absorption point so it collapses into mud. Zeonly is grudgingly impressed and warns Mirika Kunon is soon to be very important to the kingdom, so it is vital she improve herself enough to stand beside him, or he may be forced to marry someone else. Kunon responds by deducing Zeonly is the type to bully women he likes, only to be surprised when they choose to be with someone else.
6	"Incredible Training and Incredible Results"; Transliteration: "Sugoi Shugyō to Sugoi Kekka" (Japanese: すごい修行とすごい結果)	Unknown	Unknown	TBA	February 8, 2026
Kunon begins training, which mostly consists of doing Zeonly's paperwork while Zeonly sleeps for hours. At the same time Mirika begins sword training. Zeonly shows Kunon one of his magic tool designs; a box to cook food without a kitchen, and hopes he and Kunon might complete it together. Mirika starts at the Senior Academy while Kunon considers joining Magic Academy when he turns twelve. Two years later Zeonly decides to end their apprenticeship so Kunon can attend the academy where there might be another water magician to teach him. Kunon returns to working on his magic eyes. As magic academy is far away Mirika is upset she won't see him every day. She confesses to Darion a part of her wants Kunon to remain blind and dependant on her but Darion assures her it is natural as she is just upset he is leaving. Zeonly is confident he taught Kunon enough but it will be up to Kunon to actually invent working eyes. After many weeks of work Kunon considers giving up but can't wait to see everyone's faces. One day he has a breakthrough and invents a magic eye that lets him see for the first time. He is overjoyed, until the eye shows him a giant crab looming over him in his library.
7	"Kunon the Sorcerer can See"; Transliteration: "Majutsu-shi Kunon wa Mieteiru" (Japanese: 魔術師クノンは見えている)	Unknown	Unknown	TBA	February 15, 2026
Kunon is mildly surprised to experience vision and even more confused that the crab is insubstantial like a ghost, follows him everywhere and can't be seen by anyone else. Iko also appears to have a horn on her head, and the bright daylight and beautiful scenery appears dark and sinister. He grows more confused when his mother appears with eyes two different colours, Ixio with black wings, his father as an insubstantial fog, Mirika with a writing quill growing from her head and Dario with a spirit sword floating behind him. He asks Zeonly, who shines like direct sunlight, for his opinion on the issue. Zeonly suggests either Kunon is seeing the shape of people's souls instead of their physical bodies, or magic sickness is causing hallucinations. Until he discovers which, or if his visions might mean something, he advises Kunon to keep experimenting with his new eye. For his 12th birthday before he enrols at magic academy Mirika gifts Kunon a bracelet that matches her own so her won't feel lonely. Kunon departs the next day, with his family upset that now they won't see him for years until he graduates. Kunon looks forward to meeting many other sorcerers at magic academy.
8	"Farewell's and Hello's and Dirashik"; Transliteration: "Wakare to Deai to Dirashikku" (Japanese: 別れと出会いとディラシック)	Unknown	Unknown	TBA	February 22, 2026
Iko and Kunon stop at his grandfather's mansion where Iko plans to leave him before she becomes too old to marry and have her own children. Kunon is surprised that while his mother has the mismatched eyes of a heroine, his grandfather has horns of a demon lord. Iko's younger sister Rinko is waiting to become his new maid and also possesses a demon's horn identical to Iko's. As Kunon is kind to everyone, Iko warns Rinko not to let women near him, though Rinko is convinced Kunon has a future as a womaniser. After an emotional goodbye with Iko Kunon sets off with Rinko and one month later arrives in Dirashik city which holds the academy. He learns from a bookshop owner the Saint of the Holy Kingdom is enrolling as a first year, plus the Inferno Prince and the Lightning Bolt of New Kingdom are returning as second years. Kunon visits a clothing shop and on impulse creates a Dark Fox from water based on the texture of a fox fur scarf. The Saint visits the shop after he leaves and is amazed the fox was crafted from an unfamiliar spell. Kunon learns the academy dormitory is already full, so he rents a house with Rinko instead. Elsewhere, a sinister group consider the incoming first years, especially Kunon as Zeonly's apprentice.
9	"The Advanced Class"; Transliteration: "Tokkyū Kurasu" (Japanese: 特級クラス)	Unknown	Unknown	TBA	March 1, 2026
Kunon meets Saint Reyes Saint-Lance, who admits she has her own Hero's Scar that prevents her feeling emotions. Kunon meets Professor Soff, surrounded by Light orbs, and his assistant Sayfie, surrounded by mice. Soff reveals Kunon, Reyes and two other students Hank and Riyah have letters of recommendation to the Advanced Class. Hank reveals he has a fire crest with 7 elementary spells. Riyah has a wind crest with 8 elementary spells. Reyes has a light crest with 5 intermediate spells. Kunon reveals he only has 2 elementary spells. Soff is confused as Zeonly asked him to make Kunon's entrance exam as difficult as possible. Soff surrounds himself in a wind barrier and asks Kunon to hit him with water. Kunon surrounds the barrier with red water and announces he can keep it there for over 2 days, waiting for Soff to run out of magic in a few hours. Sensing this is true, Soff surrenders. Kunon is fascinated by light magic and hopes to study it, but Reyes is uninterested in helping. For individual interviews Kunon is sent to a pitch black room with 7 people who accept Kunon to the advanced class after one of them, Grey Rouva, is fascinated by his incomplete magic eye spell.
10	"The Saint's Financial Problem"; Transliteration: "Seijo no Kinsenmondai" (Japanese: 聖女の金銭問題)	Unknown	Unknown	TBA	March 8, 2026
Soff reveals advanced students are expected to support themselves without financial help from parents. Reyes is particularly inconvenienced as her monthly expenses plus two maids wages are 1.5Million. Rinko worries Iko raised Kunon into a skewed version of a gentleman, and decides to teach him to behave properly. The Church forbids Reyes from charging money for healing magic. Kunon opens his laboratory as a sleep space, charging exhausted students and professors to use his water bubble beds. Reyes' finances worsen and Soff urges her to ask Kunon for advice. As she can use Purification magic Kunon suggests they team up to create magic tools and register Reyes as the primary researcher. Kunon asks for Shi-shilla seeds from Professor Surreya, another Light user. Reyes is confused as Shi-shilla can only grow in the Holy Land but Kunon theorises with her Purification magic they can recreate the Holy Land's growing conditions artificially. Reyes is surprised when this actually works and experiences a fleeting "emotion" on learning Kunon himself paid 1Million for the seeds. From the medicine made with just five plants Reyes earns 2Million. Hank and Riyah also ask Kunon for his advice. Three female students observe Kunon while being suspicious of each other.
11	"Flying and Roasting and Being Invited"; Transliteration: "Tonde Abutte Sasowarete" (Japanese: 飛んで炙って誘われて)	Unknown	Unknown	TBA	March 15, 2026
Kunon asks Hank to cook bacon and Riyah to fly. The three girls try to talk to Kunon but always miss him. Hank struggles with temperature control and burns the bacon, while Riyah can only fly for a few seconds. The girls catch Kunon but are lured to sleep by his bubble beds. Reyes wonders why they are learning to make money and is told by Sayfie sorcerers who can't support themselves become vulnerable to criminals. Sayfie is confused no school faction has tried to recruit Reyes or Kunon yet, especially the three largest Ability, Harmony and Rationality. Hank wishes to join Harmony but Riyah can't decide. The three girls report to their factions they failed to recruit Kunon. The faction leaders Bael, Shilto and Lulu fight over who gets to talk to Kunon first. Hank finally cooks edible bacon he can sell to butchers. Hank is invited to join Harmony while Riyah is invited to join Rationality. Kunon suggests if Riyah masters flying he could become a courier. Reyes is invited to Ability but isn't sure about accepting. After fighting, the faction leaders agree Bael of Ability will talk to Kunon first, then Shilto of Harmony, then Lulu of Rationality.
12	"Fairies Checking the Answer"; Transliteration: "Yōsei-tachi no Kotae Awase" (Japanese: 妖精たちの答え合わせ)	Unknown	Unknown	TBA	March 22, 2026
Kunon writes a letter to Mirika telling her about academy life. Elia of Ability asks Kunon to join their faction, as does Elva from Harmony. Kunon flirtatiously agrees to join both factions because the girls are attractive. Riyah is confused when Kunon completely dismisses Cassis of Rationality, until Kunon hints Cassis is actually male. Kunon agrees to also join Rationality when asked by another girl. All three factions almost start fighting as they have no idea what Kunon is up to. Mirika continues her sword training but becomes upset after receiving Kunon's letter and learns he made friends, one of whom is a woman. Deciding Kunon is irresponsible with money Rinko forces him to sort out his records and accounts. Kunon is grabbed by the girls from the factions and dragged to the three leaders to sort out which faction he will actually join. Kunon's eye tells him Bael is followed by a large creature, Lulu by a black tree and Shilto by thunderclouds. Kunon worries about Geneva, a member of Ability, as he is followed by a sinister woman covering Geneva's mouth with her hands. Despite facing pressure to choose, Kunon insists he is joining all three factions.
13	"The Unprecedented Troublemaker"; Transliteration: "Zendaimimon no Mondaiji" (Japanese: 前代未聞の問題児)	Unknown	Unknown	TBA	March 29, 2026
The factions assume Kunon is being arrogant and challenge him to a magic duel to prove he is capable of joint membership. His opponents are the top four students of the advanced classes. Kunon defeats all four at once by causing it to rain, which as it wasn't an attack spell passes harmlessly through their protective barrier. Once soaked he turns the water into slime, threatening to cover their mouths so they cannot breathe. All four realise the danger and surrender. Kunon reveals he used the same method to beat Zeonly in a duel. The three factions approve his joint membership but advise him to speak with the four he defeated, particularly Cassis who has the heart of a maiden. Mirika passes a sword exam and is accepted into knight classes at noble academy. Mirika worries when Kunon's next letter reveals he has met several dozen new ladies, including one with a maiden's heart. The four girls argue over which faction Kunon will assist first while the fourth, Sandra, cares only about fighting him again. Reyes reminds Kunon about their Shi-shilla project. One of the seven mysterious people who interviewed Kunon on his first day hopes Kunon is a troublemaker like Zeonly was. Kunon accepts a request to search for a shipwreck with Cassis and Lulu.

== Reception ==
The series was ranked seventh in the tankōbon category at the 2023 Next Light Novel Awards.

== See also ==
- Kakuriyo: Bed & Breakfast for Spirits, another light novel series illustrated by Laruha
- Nia Liston: The Merciless Maiden, another light novel series written by Umikaze Minamino
- There Was a Cute Girl in the Hero's Party, So I Tried Confessing to Her, a light novel series illustrated by La-na
