= Platinum Vision =

Japanese animation studio

Platinum Vision Co., Ltd.
- Native name: プラチナビジョン株式会社
- Romanized name: Purachina Bijon kabushiki-kaisha
- Type: Kabushiki gaisha
- Industry: Animation studio
- Founded: March 30, 2016; 10 years ago
- Founder: Hiromichi Ooishi
- Headquarters: 3-37-12 Shimorenjaku, Mitaka, Tokyo, Japan
- Key people: Hiromichi Ooishi
- Total equity: ¥ 30,000,000
- Website: platinumvision.co.jp

Platinum Vision Co., Ltd. (Japanese: プラチナビジョン株式会社, Hepburn: Purachina Bijon kabushiki-kaisha) is a Japanese animation studio founded in Mitaka, Tokyo.

== Works ==
=== Television series ===
Title	Director(s)	First run start date	First run end date	Eps	Note(s)	Ref(s)
Servamp	Itto Sara; Hideaki Nakano	July 5, 2016	September 20, 2016	12	Based on a manga written by Strike Tanaka. Co-produced with Brain's Base.	
Saiyuki Reload Blast	Hideaki Nakano	July 5, 2017	September 20, 2017	12	Based on a manga written by Kazuya Minekura. Sequel to Saiyuki Reload Gunlock.	
Devils' Line	Hideaki Nakano	April 7, 2018	June 23, 2018	12	Based on a manga written by Ryo Hanada.	
Kono Oto Tomare! Sounds of Life	Ryōma Mizuno	April 6, 2019	December 28, 2019	26	Based on a manga written by Amyu.	
Dr. Ramune: Mysterious Disease Specialist	Hideaki Ōba	January 10, 2021	March 28, 2021	12	Based on a manga written by Aho Toro.	
Love of Kill	Hideaki Ōba	January 13, 2022	March 31, 2022	12	Based on a manga written by Fe.	
I'm in Love with the Villainess	Hideaki Ōba	October 3, 2023	December 19, 2023	12	Based on a light novel written by Inori.	
Classic Stars	Hideaki Ōba	April 6, 2025	June 29, 2025	13	Based on a mixed-media project by King Amusement Creative.	
Kunon the Sorcerer Can See	Hideaki Ōba	January 4, 2026	March 29, 2026	13	Based on a light novel written by Umikaze Minamino.	

=== Films ===
Title	Director(s)	Release Date	Note(s)	Ref(s)
Servamp: Alice in the Garden	Hideaki Nakano	April 7, 2018	Sequel to Servamp.	

=== Original video animation ===
Title	Director(s)	Release date	Eps	Note(s)	Ref(s)
Devils' Line: Anytime Anywhere	Hideaki Nakano	August 23, 2018	1	OVA episode for Devils' Line.	
