= Oldcodex =

Japanese rock band

- Origin: Tokyo, Japan
- Genres: Rock; anime song
- Years active: 2009–2022
- Labels: GloryHeaven (2009—2012); Lantis (2012—2022)
- Past members: Ta_2; Yorke; Ryo Yamagata; Taizo Nakamura; Shinji Ōmura; R.O.N; Yohske; Sae; Yoshihiro Nakao; Hiromitsu Kawashima; Masanori Mine

Oldcodex (stylized as OLDCODEX) was a Japanese rock band from Tokyo, Japan, formed in 2009. They performed the opening themes for the anime series Free!, Servamp and God Eater and the ending themes for Kuroko's Basketball and Togainu no Chi. Their band name indicates their wish to "create their distinctiveness" in rock music. They also take on a unique concept, having a painter draw on canvas while the main vocalist sing on live stages.

== History ==
Oldcodex was founded on October 21, 2009, by members Ta_2 (Tatsuhisa Suzuki) and R.O.N, who used to work with Ta_2 on his past solo projects. They debuted with the first mini album "OLDCODEX". They were accompanied by other members from another one named "ROSARYHILL", including R.O.N himself, YoHske and sae, though the last two did not stay from February 15, 2010, onward. On October 3, they put out their first full-length album, "hidemind", with 11 tracks in total. Many of their album covers were drawn by artist YORKE., who then became an official member of the band on November 1. Later on, the band witnessed drastic changes in the lineup, with new arrivals of 3 support members and R.O.N's departure on October 15, 2012. After 12 years of activities, the discography of Oldcodex includes 6 studio albums, a remix album, 3 mini albums, 18 singles and a digital single.

Oldcodex performed at Nippon Budokan on February 11, 2015.

On August 4, 2021, Ta_2 announced he was going on hiatus, with Oldcodex subsequently pausing their activities as well. This announcement came shortly after Shūkan Bunshun reported that he was involved in an extramarital affair with a female work associate. On August 30, 2021, Ta_2 released a statement apologizing for his "careless behavior." On December 27, 2021, it was announced that Oldcodex was set to disband following the release of the theme song for the upcoming Free! movie on the original soundtrack album which is scheduled for April 2022. Ta_2 and Yorke both shared their feelings about the announcement on the exclusive fanclub site, which was closed down at 12PM local time on March 1, 2022. They officially disbanded on May 31, 2022. The official website and Twitter account for the band were shut down on August 31, 2022. The band's website now redirects to the Lantis website.

== Members ==
=== Final members ===
- Ta_2 – vocals
- YORKE. – paints, lyrics
- Ryo Yamagata – drums
- Taizo Nakamura – bass guitar
- Shinji Ōmura – guitar

=== Former members ===
- R.O.N – guitar, arrangement
- YoHsKE – guitar
- Sae – drums
- Yoshihiro Nakao – guitar
- Hiromitsu Kawashima – bass guitar
- Masanori Mine – guitar

== Discography ==
=== Albums ===
Studio albums

Year	Title	Oricon chart position
2010	Hidemind	44
2012	Contrast Silver	28
2014	A Silent, within the Roar	5
2016	Fixed Engine	3
2017	They Go, Where?	8
2019	Ladderless	7
2021	Full Colors	36

Mini albums

Year	Title	Oricon chart position
2009	Oldcodex	51
2011	Flower	48
2015	Pledge	5

=== Singles ===
Year	Title	Oricon Chart position	Notes
2010	"[Blue]"	29	—N/a
2010	"flag on the hill"	55	—N/a
2011	"Harsh Wind"	55	—N/a
2012	"Cold Hands"	56	—N/a
2012	"Catal Rhythm" (カタルリズム)	20	2nd ending theme song for Kuroko's Basketball
2013	"The Misfit Go"	31	1st ending theme song for Arata: The Legend
2013	"Rage on"	6	Opening theme song for Free! – Iwatobi Swim Club
2013	"WALK"	18	Ending theme song for Kuroko's Basketball 2
2014	"Dried Up Youthful Fame"	7	Opening theme song for Free! Eternal Summer
2015	"Lantana"	10	3rd ending theme song for Kuroko's Basketball 3
2015	"Feed A"	13	Opening theme song for God Eater
2015	"Aching Horns"	10	Theme song for High Speed! -Free! Starting Days-
2016	"Deal With"	23	Opening theme song for Servamp
2016	"Scribble & Beyond"	11	Theme song for Kuroko's Basketball Winter Cup Compilation
2018	"Growth Arrow"	11	Theme song for Butlers: Chitose Momotose Monogatari
2018	"One Side"	—N/a	Theme song for Servamp -Alice in the Garden-
2018	"Heading to Over"	9	Theme song for Free!-Dive to the Future-
2019	"Take on Fever"	24	Theme song for Special 7: Special Crime Investigation Unit
2020	"Core Fade"	14	Theme song for ULTRAMAN

=== As guest artists ===
Year	Title	Album	Oricon Chart position	Notes
2022	"Dried Up Youthful Fame – Version:Free –"	Free! -the Final Stroke- The Second Volume Original Soundtrack "Never Ending Blue"	21	Originally scheduled to be the theme song for the first part of the movie Free! -the Final Stroke-, now released as image song.
2022	"This Fading Blue"	Free! -the Final Stroke- The Second Volume Original Soundtrack "Never Ending Blue"	21	Theme song for the second part of the movie Free! -the Final Stroke-.

=== DVDs ===
- Harsh Wind Tour live (October 21, 2011)
- Catalrhythm Tour (March 20, 2013)
- Contrast Silver Tour final live (December 25, 2013)
- OLDCODEX Live Blu-ray "ONE PLEDGES" 2015 in ZEPP DIVERCITY (2015)
- OLDCODEX Live Blu-ray "Capture" 2015 in Budokan (August 26, 2015)
- OLDCODEX Live Blu-ray "Veni Vidi" 2016 in Budokan (August 24, 2016)
- OLDCODEX Live Blu-ray "Fixed Engine" 2016–2017 in Budokan (August 30, 2017)
