= Tsubasa Yonaga =

Japanese voice actor

- 代永 翼
- Born: January 15, 1984 (age 42); Kanagawa Prefecture, Japan
- Occupations: Voice actor; singer
- Years active: 2006–present
- Agent: Ken Production
- Height: 163 cm (5 ft 4 in)
- Spouse: Yuka Nishigaki (m. 2015)
- Children: 2
- Website: kiramune.jp/artist/Trignal/

Tsubasa Yonaga (代永 翼, Yonaga Tsubasa; born January 15, 1984) is a Japanese voice actor and singer who works for Ken Production. He is best known for his roles as Nagisa Hazuki in Free! and Sangaku Manami in Yowamushi Pedal. He is married to fellow voice actress Yuka Nishigaki.

== Biography ==
Yonaga was born in Kanagawa Prefecture and raised in Ushiku, Ibaraki. He has an older sister who is six years older than him and a younger sister who is four years younger than him. When he was in the fifth grade, his voice hardly changed. When he talked to his homeroom teacher, who knew that he liked singing, acting, and recitation, he was told about the profession of voice acting, which led him to become a voice actor. He has been a member of a drama club since his second year of high school. After graduating from the voice actor vocal course at the vocational school Tokyo Media Academy (now the voice actor training course at Tokyo Seiyu Academy), he entered School Duo, a voice actor training school attached to Ken Production, as a 6th year student. He then made his debut in his third year at Ken Production, when he was entrusted to the office.

In 2006, he made his voice acting debut as a student in the OVA Cluster Edge Secret Episode. In 2007, he played the role of Shingo Suwa in Gigantic Formula and Ren Mihashi in Big Windup!, his first leading role in an anime. In 2008, Yonaga won the Best Rookie award at the 2nd Seiyu Awards.

In April 2011, he formed the music unit "Trignal" with Takuya Eguchi and Ryōhei Kimura. On December 12, 2012, he made his CD debut as "Trignal" with the mini-album "PARTY" under the Kiramune label. He has also formed a unit called "BRAVE WING" with Yuki Kaji, and "Genki Dan" with Fumihiro Okabayashi and Yuka Nishigaki, who belong to the same agency. On May 4, 2015, he announced on his Twitter page that he had married Nishigaki. On July 18, 2018, he announced the birth of their first child.

On November 18, 2019, his office and his Twitter announced that he would be limiting some of his activities due to treatment for dysphonia.

On October 9, 2024, he announced the birth of their second child.

== Filmography ==
=== Animation ===
2007

- Gigantic Formula (Shingo Suwa)
- Big Windup! (Ren Mihashi)
- Wangan Midnight (Harada)

2008

- Bamboo Blade (Fujimura)
- Bleach (Shū Kannogi)
- Chaos;Head (Shogun)
- Persona: Trinity Soul (Shiiba and Wakaba)
- S · A: Special A (Jun Yamamoto)
- Shugo Chara! (Kirishima Fuyuki)

2009

- Guin Saga (Remus)
- Yumeiro Patissiere (Satsuki Hanabusa)
- Stitch! ~Itazura Alien no Daibōken~ (Hans)

2010

- Demon King Daimao (Miwa Hiroshi)
- MM! (Yukinozo Himura)
- Beyblade: Metal Fusion (Damure)
- Model Suit Gunpla Builders Beginning G (Haru Irei)
- Ōkiku Furikabutte ~Natsu no Taikai Hen~ (Ren Mihashi)

2011

- Cardfight!! Vanguard (Aichi Sendou)
- Chihayafuru (Tsutomu Komano)
- Persona 4 (Naoki Konishi)
- Tiger & Bunny (Tony)

2012

- Acchi Kocchi (Kyoya Saibara)
- Area no Kishi (Matoba Kaoru)
- Cardfight!! Vanguard: Asia Circuit (Aichi Sendou)
- Fairy Tail (Rufus Lohr)
- La storia della Arcana Famiglia (Nova)
- One Piece (Bobbin)
- Sword Art Online (Sasamaru)
- Tasogare OtomexAmnesia (Teiichi Niiya)
- Chōyaku Hyakunin isshu: Uta Koi (Ki no Tsurayuki)

2013

- Cardfight!! Vanguard: Link Joker (Aichi Sendou)
- Chihayafuru 2 (Tsutomu Komano)
- Free! - Iwatobi Swim Club (Nagisa Hazuki)
- Hakkenden: Tōhō Hakken Ibun (Shinobu Inue)
- Inazuma Eleven GO Galaxy (Kazuto Minaho)
- Uta no Prince-sama Maji Love 2000% (Season 2) (Nagi Mikado)
- Valvrave the Liberator (Prue)
- Yowamushi Pedal (Sangaku Manami)

2014

- Cardfight!! Vanguard: Legion Mate (Aichi Sendou)
- Donten ni Warau (Chutaro Kumo)
- Free! Eternal Summer (Nagisa Hazuki)
- Log Horizon (Kijo)
- Love Stage!! (Izumi Sena)
- Mobile Suit Gundam-san (Amuro-san)
- Yowamushi Pedal Grande Road (Sangaku Manami)

2015

- Cute High Earth Defense Club Love! (Rui Megawa)
- World Trigger (Tsukihiko Amo)
- Uta no Prince-sama Maji Love Revolutions (Season 3) (Nagi Mikado)
- Akagami no Shirayuki-hime (Shuka)

2016

- Ace of Diamond Season 2 (Shinji Akamatsu)
- Beyblade Burst (Kensuke Midorikawa)
- Cardfight!! Vanguard G: GIRS Crisis (Aichi Sendou)
- Reikenzan: Hoshikuzu-tachi no Utage (Oriku)
- Zutto Mae Kara Suki Deshita: Kokuhaku Jikkō Iinkai (Koyuki Ayase)
- D.Gray-man Hallow (Young Yu Kanda)
- Uta no Prince-sama Maji LOVE Legend Star (Season 4) (Nagi Mikado)
- Suki ni Naru Sono Shunkan o: Kokuhaku Jikkō Iinkai (Koyuki Ayase)

2017

- Kenka Bancho Otome: Girl Beats Boys (Hikaru Onigashima)
- Yowamushi Pedal: New Generation (Sangaku Manami)
- Cardfight!! Vanguard G: NEXT (Aichi Sendou)
- Cardfight!! Vanguard G: Z (Aichi Sendou)
- Vatican Miracle Examiner (Ryōta Hiraga)
- UQ Holder! (Vasago)

2018

- IDOLiSH7 (Mitsuki Izumi)
- Beyblade Burst God (Kensuke Midorikawa)
- Free! Dive to The Future (Nagisa Hazuki)
- Cardfight!! Vanguard カードファイト!! ヴァンガード (Aichi Sendou)
- Yowamushi Pedal: Glory Line (Sangaku Manami)
- The Thousand Musketeers (Ekaterina)

2019

- Chihayafuru 3 (Tsutomu Komano)

2020

- A Destructive God Sits Next to Me (Hibiki Kimiya)
- IDOLiSH7 Second Beat! (Mitsuki Izumi)
- Ace of Diamond act II (Shinji Akamatsu)

2021

- IDOLiSH7 Third Beat! (Mitsuki Izumi)

2023

- Record of Ragnarok (Okita Sōji)

2024

- Dragon Ball Daima (Mini Trunks)

=== Anime films ===
- Free! Timeless Medley (2017), Nagisa Hazuki
- The Seven Deadly Sins the Movie: Prisoners of the Sky (2018), Sorada
- Grisaia: Phantom Trigger the Animation (2019), Haruto Aoi
- Free! The Final Stroke Part 1 (2021–2022), Nagisa Hazuki
- Toku Touken Ranbu: Hanamaru ~Setsugetsuka~ (2022), Kenshin Kagemitsu
- Pretty Guardian Sailor Moon Cosmos The Movie (2023), Blue Saphir
- Nintama Rantarō: Invincible Master of the Dokutake Ninja (2024), Moroizumi Sonnamon

=== Original video animation (OVA) ===
- Alice in Borderland (2014), Chōta Segawa
- Hybrid Child (2014), Yuzu
- Yarichin Bitch Club (2018), Keiichi Akemi

=== Original net animation (ONA) ===
- Pretty Guardian Sailor Moon Crystal Season II (2015), Blue Saphir
- Record of Ragnarok II (2023), Okita Sōji

=== Games ===
2006

- Time Hollow (Ethan Kairos)

2008

- Real Rode (Somari)
- VitaminZ (Yakumo Tachibana)
- Chaos;Head (Shogun)

2009

- Chaos;Head Noah (Shogun)

2010

- Blaze Union (Nessiah, Mizer)

2011

- Chaos Code (Catherine)
- Corpse Party: Book of Shadows (Kurosaki Kensuke)
- Tales of Xillia (Jude Mathis)
- Tokyo Yamanote Boys (Honey Milk Disc) (Momose Ayumu)

2012

- E.X. Troopers (Luan Forest)
- Fairy Tail (Rufus Lohr)
- Tales of Xillia 2 (Jude Mathis)
- Toki to Towa (Zack/Player)
- Unchained Blades (Hector)

2014

- Houkago Colorful Step: Undo-bu! (Kiryuu Nanao)
- Majou Ou (Drop Rust)
- Snow Bound Land (Craes)

2015

- IDOLiSH7 (Izumi Mitsuki)

2016

- Kamen Rider Battride War Genesis (Philip / Kamen Rider Double Fang Joker)
- Kenka Bancho Otome (Hikaru Onigashima)
- Tales of Berseria (Jude Mathis)
- Digimon Universe: Appli Monsters (Sakusimon)

2018

- Senjuushi The Thousand Noble Musketeers (Ekaterina)

2019

- Another Eden (Dewey)
- Ayakashi: Romance Reborn (Kagemaru)

2021

- Argonavis from BanG Dream AASide (Mitsurugi Koharu)
