= List of Cardfight!! Vanguard episodes =

Cover of the first volume of Cardfight!! Vanguard DVD released in 2011

This is a list of episodes from the anime Cardfight!! Vanguard. In July 2010, an anime television series based on the game was green-lit by TMS Entertainment under the directorial supervision of Hatsuki Tsuji. Music is composed by Takayuki Negishi while Mari Tominaga provided the character designs. The series began airing in Japan on TV Aichi beginning on January 8, 2011, and rebroadcast by AT-X, TV Tokyo, TV Osaka, and TV Setouchi systems. The media-streaming website Crunchyroll simulcasted the first season to the United States, Canada, the United Kingdom, and Ireland. Crunchyroll began streaming the second season to the United States, Canada, and the United Kingdom on June 30, 2012.

Twenty-five pieces of theme music are used for the series—nine opening themes and seventeen closing themes (one of which is exclusive to the English dub). The anime also features two insert songs performed by Ultra Rare (i.e. Suzuko Mimori, Yoshino Nanjō, and Aimi Terakawa, who are the original Japanese voice actresses of Kourin, Rekka, and Suiko). The two songs are "Miracle Trigger ~Tomorrow Will Be Ultra Rare!~" (ミラクルトリガー ~きっと明日はウルトラレア!~) (used in episodes 18, 26, and 115; simply known as "Miracle Trigger" in the English dub) and "Stand Up! DREAM" (スタンドアップ! DREAM) (used in episodes 39, 115, and 118).

An English dub co-produced by Ocean Productions (recorded at Blue Water Studios) began airing on Singapore's Okto channel from October 16, 2011, on Animax Asia from January 22, 2012, and on Malaysia's RTM-TV2 channel from November 18, 2012. Dubbed episodes also began being released on YouTube from May 29, 2012. The series can be seen legally on a dedicated channel for it created by Bushiroad, the original creators and manufacturers of the card game, and as of June 25 is available for viewing in most countries without geo-blocking.

While there are a few changes, the English dub adaption is mostly faithful to the original Japanese version. However, the most notable change in the English dub is that three opening themes and three ending themes are used. The only openings are English versions of the first opening theme "Vanguard" (from eps. 1-65), the third opening theme "Limit Break" (from eps. 66–104), and the fourth opening theme "Vanguard Fight" (from eps. 105 onward), all of which are still performed by their original respective artists.

The first ending theme used in the dub is an English version of the third ending theme "Dream Shooter" (from eps. 1-65) while the second ending theme is a unique song titled "Way To Victory" (from eps. 66–104), both of which are performed by Sea☆A. The ending credit sequence for this exclusive theme is the one used for the original sixth ending theme "Jōnetsu-ism". The third ending theme used in the dub is an English version of the original ninth ending song "Endless☆Fighter" (from eps. 105 onward), which is performed only by Aimi Terakawa in the dub. Similarly, the Ultra Rare insert songs are performed in English by Suzuko Mimori, Yoshino Nanjō, and Aimi Terakawa (the original Japanese voice actresses of Kourin, Rekka, and Suiko).

Individual episodes from seasons 1-5 are known as "Rides", and the episodes from Cardfight!! Vanguard G are known as "Turns".

== Series overview ==
=== Generation 1 (2011-2014) ===
Season	Episodes	Originally released	
Season	Episodes	First released	Last released
1	65	January 8, 2011	March 31, 2012
2	39	April 8, 2012	January 2, 2013
3	59	January 13, 2013	March 2, 2014
4	33	March 9, 2014	October 19, 2014

=== Cardfight!! Vanguard G (Generation 2) ===
Season	Episodes	Originally released	
Season	Episodes	First released	Last released
1	48	October 26, 2014	October 4, 2015
2	26	October 11, 2015	April 10, 2016
3	24	March 17, 2016	September 25, 2016
4	52	October 2, 2016	October 1, 2017
5	24	October 8, 2017	April 1, 2018

== Cardfight!! Vanguard seasons ==
=== Season 1: Cardfight!! Vanguard (2011–2012) ===
No.	Title	Original release date
1	"Vanguard of Destiny!"; Transliteration: "Unmei no Vangādo!!" (Japanese: 運命の先導者!!)	January 8, 2011
2	"Ride to Victory!"; Transliteration: "Shōri e no Raido" (Japanese: 勝利へのライド)	January 15, 2011
3	"Welcome to Card Capital"; Transliteration: "Yōkoso! Kādo Kyapitaru e" (Japanese: ようこそ! カードキャピタルへ)	January 22, 2011
4	"Assault! Twin Drive!"; Transliteration: "Mōkō! Tsuin Doraibu" (Japanese: 猛攻! ツインドライブ)	January 29, 2011
5	"Whirlwind! Kamui, the Grade-School Fighter!"; Transliteration: "Senpū! Shōgakusei Faitā Kamui" (Japanese: 旋風! 小学生ファイターカムイ)	February 5, 2011
6	"The Mysterious Card Shop!"; Transliteration: "Nazo no Kādo Shoppu" (Japanese: 謎(なぞ)のカードショップ)	February 12, 2011
7	"The Fearsome Soulblast!"; Transliteration: "Senritsu no Souruburasuto" (Japanese: 戦(せん)慄(りつ)のソウルブラスト)	February 19, 2011
8	"The King of Knights Enters The Fray!"; Transliteration: "Kishi-ō, Shutsujin!" (Japanese: 騎士王、出陣!)	February 26, 2011
9	"The Shop Tournament Begins!"; Transliteration: "Shoppu Taikai Kaimaku" (Japanese: ショップ大会開幕)	March 5, 2011
10	"Enter the Ninja Fighter!"; Transliteration: "Ninja Faitā, Sanjō" (Japanese: 忍者ファイター、参上)	March 12, 2011
11	"Ninja Fighter Withdraws!"; Transliteration: "Ninja Faitā, Taijō" (Japanese: 忍者ファイター、退場)	March 19, 2011
12	"Aichi vs. Kamui"; Transliteration: "Aichi VS Kamui" (Japanese: アイチVSカムイ)	March 26, 2011
13	"Shop Tournament Winner Crowned!"; Transliteration: "Kecchaku! Shoppu Taikai" (Japanese: 決着! ショップ大会)	April 2, 2011
14	"The Fearsome Undead! The Granblue Deck!"; Transliteration: "Fushi no Kyōfu! Guranburū Dekki" (Japanese: 不死の恐怖! グランブルーデッキ)	April 9, 2011
15	"Thrilling! Emi's First Fight!"; Transliteration: "Harahara!? Emi no Hatsu Faito" (Japanese: ハラハラ!? エミの初ファイト)	April 16, 2011
16	"Team Q4 Heads for the Regional Tournament!"; Transliteration: "Chīmu Q4, Chiku Taikai e" (Japanese: チームQ4(キューフォー)、地区大会へ)	April 30, 2011
17	"New Allies"; Transliteration: "Aratanaru Nakama-tachi" (Japanese: 新たなる仲間たち)	May 7, 2011
18	"White-Hot Tournament!"; Transliteration: "Hakunetsu no Tōnamento!" (Japanese: 白熱のトーナメント!)	May 14, 2011
19	"Showdown! Nova Grappler!"; Transliteration: "Kessen! Nova Gurappurā!" (Japanese: 決戦! ノヴァグラップラー!)	May 21, 2011
20	"Hidden Message"; Transliteration: "Himerareta Messēji" (Japanese: 秘められたメッセージ)	May 28, 2011
21	"Rematch in the Final Match!"; Transliteration: "Kesshō de no Saisen!!" (Japanese: 決勝での再戦!!)	June 4, 2011
22	"The Holy Dragon Descends"; Transliteration: "Maiorita Hijiri Ryū" (Japanese: 舞い降りた聖龍)	June 11, 2011
23	"Fateful Encounter"; Transliteration: "Unmei no Deai" (Japanese: 運命の出会い)	June 18, 2011
24	"The Indelible Memory"; Transliteration: "Kesenai Kioku" (Japanese: 消せない記憶)	June 25, 2011
25	"Beyond the Memories"; Transliteration: "Kioku no Saki ni" (Japanese: 記憶の先に)	July 2, 2011
26	"A Stormy Beginning! The National Championship!"; Transliteration: "Haran no Makuake! Zenkoku Taikai!!" (Japanese: 波乱の幕開け! 全国大会!!)	July 9, 2011
27	"Jurassic Army"; Transliteration: "Jurashikku Āmī" (Japanese: ジュラシックアーミー)	July 16, 2011
28	"Aggressive Movement! Tachikaze Deck!!"; Transliteration: "Mōshin! Tachikaze Dekki!!" (Japanese: 猛進! たちかぜデッキ!!)	July 23, 2011
29	"When the Moon is Full"; Transliteration: "Tsuki, Michiru Toki" (Japanese: 月、 満ちるとき)	July 30, 2011
30	"The Strongest Team, Asteroid! / The Strongest Team, AL4!"; Transliteration: "Saikyō chīmu, A(Apekkusu)L(Rimiteddo)4(Fō)!" (Japanese: 最強チーム、AL4(アペックスリミテッドフォー)！)	August 6, 2011
31	"Beautiful Assassin"; Transliteration: "Utsukushiki Asashin" (Japanese: 美しきアサシン)	August 13, 2011
32	"Demon World General"; Transliteration: "Makai no Shōgun" (Japanese: 魔界の将軍)	August 20, 2011
33	"Blaster of Darkness"; Transliteration: "Shikkoku no Burasutā" (Japanese: 漆黒のブラスター)	August 27, 2011
34	"It's Summer! It's Camp! It's Vanguard!"; Transliteration: "Natsu da! Gasshuku da! Vangādo da!" (Japanese: 夏だ! 合宿だ! ヴァンガードだ!)	September 3, 2011
35	"Results of the Training Camp"; Transliteration: "Gasshuku no Seika" (Japanese: 合宿の成果)	September 10, 2011
36	"The King of Underground Fights"; Transliteration: "Ura Faito no Ō" (Japanese: 裏ファイトの王)	September 17, 2011
37	"The Return of the Ninja Master"; Transliteration: "Kaettekita Ninja Masutā" (Japanese: 帰ってきた忍者マスター)	September 24, 2011
38	"Miwa's Ability"; Transliteration: "Miwa no Jitsuryoku" (Japanese: 三和の実力)	October 1, 2011
39	"Return to Regionals"; Transliteration: "Chiku Taikai, Futatabi" (Japanese: 地区大会、 再び)	October 8, 2011
40	"Dangerous Scent"; Transliteration: "Kiken na Nioi" (Japanese: 危険な匂い)	October 15, 2011
41	"Kyou's Revenge"; Transliteration: "Fukushū no Kyō" (Japanese: 復讐のキョウ)	October 22, 2011
42	"Psyqualia"; Transliteration: "PSY Kuoria" (Japanese: PSYクオリア)	October 29, 2011
43	"The Black Vanguard"; Transliteration: "Kuroi Sendō-sha" (Japanese: 黒い先導者)	November 5, 2011
44	"Unexpected Visitor"; Transliteration: "Yokisenu Raikyaku" (Japanese: 予期せぬ来客)	November 12, 2011
45	"Shadow Paladin"; Transliteration: "Shadō Paradin" (Japanese: シャドウパラディン)	November 19, 2011
46	"The Coiling Thread"; Transliteration: "Karamitsuku Ito" (Japanese: 絡みつく糸)	November 26, 2011
47	"Another Asteroid / Another Foo Fighter"; Transliteration: "Mō Hitotsu no Fū Faitā" (Japanese: もう一つのフーファイター)	December 3, 2011
48	"Lonely Fight"; Transliteration: "Kodoku na Faito" (Japanese: 孤独なファイト)	December 10, 2011
49	"Kai's Battle"; Transliteration: "Kai no Tatakai" (Japanese: 櫂の戦い)	December 17, 2011
50	"At the End of the Battle..."; Transliteration: "Tatakai no Hate ni..." (Japanese: 戦いの果てに...)	December 24, 2011
51	"Golden Glow"; Transliteration: "Ōgon no Kagayaki" (Japanese: 黄金の輝き)	December 31, 2011
52	"Songstress of the Sea"; Transliteration: "Yōjō no Utahime" (Japanese: 洋上の歌姫)	January 7, 2012
53	"The Battle Begins! Tournament Finals"; Transliteration: "Kaisen! Kesshō Tōnamento" (Japanese: 開戦! 決勝トーナメント)	January 7, 2012
54	"Gladiator"; Transliteration: "Guradiētā" (Japanese: 剣闘士(グラディエーター))	January 14, 2012
55	"Caesar's Empress"; Transliteration: "Kaesaru no Jōtei" (Japanese: カエサルの女帝)	January 21, 2012
56	"The Man They Call "The Emperor"!"; Transliteration: "Kōtei to Yobareru Otoko" (Japanese: 皇帝と呼ばれる男)	January 28, 2012
57	"Fateful Showdown!"; Transliteration: "Shukumei no Taiketsu" (Japanese: 宿命の対決)	February 4, 2012
58	"Clash! Overlord"; Transliteration: "Gekitotsu! Ōbārōdo" (Japanese: 激突! オーバーロード)	February 11, 2012
59	"Fighting for the Top Spot"; Transliteration: "Chōten no Za o Kakete" (Japanese: 頂点の座を賭けて)	February 18, 2012
60	"Wall of the General"; Transliteration: "Shōgun no Kabe" (Japanese: 将軍の壁)	February 25, 2012
61	"Feelings Towards Asteroid / Feelings Towards Foo Fighter"; Transliteration: "Fū Faitā e no Omoi" (Japanese: フーファイターへの想い)	March 3, 2012
62	"Lord of the Fight"; Transliteration: "Faito no Shihaisha" (Japanese: ファイトの支配者)	March 10, 2012
63	"Two Powers, Side-by-Side"; Transliteration: "Narabitatsu Nōryokusha" (Japanese: 並び立つ能力者)	March 17, 2012
64	"The Truth of Psyqualia"; Transliteration: "Saikuoria no Shinjitsu" (Japanese: PSYクオリアの真実)	March 24, 2012
65	"Awakening of the Twin Blades"; Transliteration: "Mezameshi Sōken" (Japanese: 目覚めし双剣)	March 31, 2012

=== Season 2: Cardfight!! Vanguard: Asia Circuit (2012–2013) ===
No. overall	No. in season	Title	Original release date
66	1	"Gold Paladin"; Transliteration: "Gōrudo Paradin" (Japanese: 金色の騎士団)	April 8, 2012
67	2	"Activate! Limit Break!"; Transliteration: "Hatsudō! Rimitto Bureiku!!" (Japanese: 発動! リミットブレイク!!)	April 15, 2012
68	3	"Team Q4 Once More"; Transliteration: "Chīmu Q4 Futatabi" (Japanese: チームQ4再び)	April 22, 2012
69	4	"A Challenge from PSY"; Transliteration: "PSY kara no Chōsen-jō" (Japanese: PSYからの挑戦状)	April 29, 2012
70	5	"Let It Begin! The VF Circuit!"; Transliteration: "Kaimaku! VF Sākitto!!" (Japanese: 開幕! VFサーキット!!)	May 6, 2012
71	6	"Enter Team Ninja"; Transliteration: "Sanjō! Chīmu Shinobu" (Japanese: 参上! チーム忍)	May 13, 2012
72	7	"The Lion That Surpasses The Limit"; Transliteration: "Genkai o Koeru Shishi" (Japanese: 限界を超える獅子)	May 20, 2012
73	8	"Fortune Telling Cardfight!"; Transliteration: "Uranai Faito!" (Japanese: 占いファイト!)	May 27, 2012
74	9	"Dream Girl Dilemma!"; Transliteration: "Megami o Kakete!" (Japanese: 女神を賭けて!)	June 3, 2012
75	10	"Pride of the Elite"; Transliteration: "Erīto no Kokori" (Japanese: エリートの誇り)	June 10, 2012
76	11	"The Advent of a Genius"; Transliteration: "Tensai Kōrin" (Japanese: 天才降臨)	June 17, 2012
77	12	"Challenger at the Snow Fields"; Transliteration: "Setsugen no Chōsen-sha" (Japanese: 雪原の挑戦者)	June 24, 2012
78	13	"A Visit from Tetsu"; Transliteration: "Tetsu Genru" (Japanese: テツ現る)	July 1, 2012
79	14	"Excitement at the Seoul Stage!"; Transliteration: "Nekkyō-tekina no Sourusutēji" (Japanese: 熱狂的なのソウルステージ)	July 8, 2012
80	15	"The Startling New Member"; Transliteration: "Kyōgaku no Shin Menbā" (Japanese: 驚愕の新メンバー)	July 15, 2012
81	16	"Rematch of the Knights"; Transliteration: "Kishitachi no Saisen" (Japanese: 騎士たちの再戦)	July 22, 2012
82	17	"Challenge of a Hero"; Transliteration: "Eiyū no Chōsen" (Japanese: 英雄の挑戦)	July 29, 2012
83	18	"The Legendary Fighter"; Transliteration: "Densetsu no Faitā" (Japanese: 伝説のファイター)	August 5, 2012
84	19	"An Invitation to Everlasting Summer"; Transliteration: "Tō Natsu e no Jōtaijō" (Japanese: 遠夏 への招待状)	August 12, 2012
85	20	"Our Respective Summers"; Transliteration: "Sorezore no Natsu" (Japanese: それぞれの夏)	August 19, 2012
86	21	"Handsome Fight! Mitsusada vs. Gouki / Handsome Fight! Koutei vs. Gouki"; Transliteration: "Otokomae Faito! Mitsusada VS Gouki" (Japanese: 男前ファイト! 光定VSゴウキ)	August 26, 2012
87	22	"Passion! The Hong Kong Stage"; Transliteration: "Moeyo! Honkon Sutēji" (Japanese: 燃えよ! 香港ステージ)	September 2, 2012
88	23	"Power of the Tag Fight!"; Transliteration: "Saikyō! Taggufaito" (Japanese: 最強! タッグファイト)	September 9, 2012
89	24	"The Weed Soul!! / The Entangling Weeds!"; Transliteration: "Zassō Tamashī!!" (Japanese: The•草•魂!!)	September 16, 2012
90	25	"All Hands on Deck! The Legendary Fleet"; Transliteration: "Shutsugeki! Densetsu no Kantai" (Japanese: 出撃! 伝説の艦隊)	September 23, 2012
91	26	"Blue Storm Dragon, Maelstrom"; Transliteration: "Sōran Ryū Meirusutorōmu" (Japanese: 蒼嵐竜 メイルストローム)	September 30, 2012
92	27	"Q4 vs. Ultra Rare"; Transliteration: "Q4 VS Urutorarea" (Japanese: Q4 VS ウルトラレア)	October 7, 2012
93	28	"The Angels' Dance"; Transliteration: "Tenshi-tachi no Mai" (Japanese: 天使たちの舞い)	October 14, 2012
94	29	"A Gathering of Winners"; Transliteration: "Tsudoishi Shōsha-tachi" (Japanese: 集いし勝者たち)	October 21, 2012
95	30	"Assemble! Japan Stage"; Transliteration: "Jūketsu! Nihon Sutēji" (Japanese: 集結! 日本ステージ)	October 28, 2012
96	31	"Decisive Battle! Bridal Fight"; Transliteration: "Kessen! Buraidarufaito" (Japanese: 決戦! ブライダルファイト)	November 4, 2012
97	32	"The King's Challenge"; Transliteration: "Ō kara no Chōsen-jō" (Japanese: 王からの挑戦状)	November 11, 2012
98	33	"A New Shine!"; Transliteration: "Aratanaru Kagayaki!" (Japanese: 新たなる輝き!)	November 18, 2012
99	34	"The Truth of the Wind"; Transliteration: "Kaze no Shinjitsu" (Japanese: 風の真実)	November 25, 2012
100	35	"The Blazing Lion"; Transliteration: "Kōki no Shishi" (Japanese: 光輝の獅子)	December 2, 2012
101	36	"Leon Soryu"; Transliteration: "Sōryū Reon" (Japanese: 蒼龍レオン)	December 9, 2012
102	37	"The Wind's Judgment"; Transliteration: "Kaze no Shinpan" (Japanese: 風の審判)	December 16, 2012
103	38	"Light and Nothingness"; Transliteration: "Hikari to Kyomu" (Japanese: 光と虚無)	December 23, 2012
104	39	"Where the Wind Blows"; Transliteration: "Kaze no Yukue" (Japanese: 風のゆくえ)	January 2, 2013

=== Season 3: Cardfight!! Vanguard: Link Joker (2013–2014) ===
No.	Title	Original release date
105	"Stand Up, It's High School!"; Transliteration: "Sutandoappu za Haisukūru!" (Japanese: スタンド・アップ・ザ・ハイスクール!)	January 13, 2013
106	"Catching a Break"; Transliteration: "Omae ni Bureiku" (Japanese: お前にブレイク)	January 20, 2013
107	"Targeted Idol"; Transliteration: "Nerawareta Aidoru" (Japanese: 狙われたアイドル)	January 27, 2013
108	"The Football Team's Assassin"; Transliteration: "Amefutobu no Shikaku" (Japanese: アメフト部の刺客)	February 3, 2013
109	"Birth of the Cardfight Club!"; Transliteration: "Tanjō!? Kādofaitobu" (Japanese: 誕生!?カードファイト部)	February 10, 2013
110	"First Match! Miyaji Academy vs. Hitsue High School"; Transliteration: "Hatsu Shiai! Miyaji Gakuen VS Hitsue Kōkō" (Japanese: 初試合！宮地学園VS後江高校)	February 17, 2013
111	"Reinforcements from the Junior High School!"; Transliteration: "Suketto wa Chūgakusei!" (Japanese: 助っとは中学生!)	February 24, 2013
112	"Kai's Shadow"; Transliteration: "Kai no Kage" (Japanese: 櫂の影)	March 3, 2013
113	"Who's the Vice-Captain?!"; Transliteration: "Fukubuchō wa Dare Da!?" (Japanese: 副部長はだれだ!?)	March 10, 2013
114	"Miyaji Academy, Middle School Division"; Transliteration: "Miyaji Gakuen Chūtōbu" (Japanese: 宮地学園中等部)	March 17, 2013
115	"Idol Fight"; Transliteration: "Aidoru Faito" (Japanese: アイドルファイト)	March 24, 2013
116	"Reunion with the Wind"; Transliteration: "Kaze to no Saikai" (Japanese: 風との再会)	March 31, 2013
117	"The Powerful Fukuhara High"; Transliteration: "Kyōgō Fukuhara Kōkō" (Japanese: 強豪 福原高校)	April 7, 2013
118	"Drama at the School Festival"; Transliteration: "Dokidoki no Bunkasai" (Japanese: ドキドキの文化祭)	April 14, 2013
119	"Legendary School Festival"; Transliteration: "Densetsu no Bunkasai" (Japanese: 伝説の文化祭)	April 21, 2013
120	"Hidden Fighting Spirit"; Transliteration: "Himetaru Tōshi" (Japanese: 秘めたる闘志)	April 28, 2013
121	"A Man's Willpower"; Transliteration: "Otoko no Iji" (Japanese: 男の意地)	May 5, 2013
122	"Naoki, the Challenger!"; Transliteration: "Charenjā Naoki" (Japanese: 挑戦者 ナオキ)	May 12, 2013
123	"Feelings About Victory"; Transliteration: "Shōri e no Omoi" (Japanese: 勝利への想い)	May 19, 2013
124	"Showdown at the Summit"; Transliteration: "Futari no Chōjō Kessen" (Japanese: 二人の頂上決戦)	May 26, 2013
125	"A Windy Day"; Transliteration: "Kaze no Tsuyoi Hi" (Japanese: 風の強い日)	June 2, 2013
126	"Mystery Dragon"; Transliteration: "Nazo no Doragon" (Japanese: 謎のドラゴン)	June 9, 2013
127	"Facing the "Lock""; Transliteration: "Rokku" (Japanese: 呪縛)	June 16, 2013
128	"Into the Reverse"; Transliteration: "Ribāsu" (Japanese: "Я" -リバース-)	June 23, 2013
129	"The Power of the Black Rings"; Transliteration: "Kokurin no Chikara" (Japanese: 黒輪の力)	June 30, 2013
130	"Dark Clouds Over Fukuhara High!"; Transliteration: "Anun Fukuhara Kōkō" (Japanese: 暗雲 福原高校)	July 7, 2013
131	"Eternal Marionette"; Transliteration: "Towa no Marionetto" (Japanese: 永遠の操り人形)	July 14, 2013
132	"The Last Dance"; Transliteration: "Rasuto Dansu" (Japanese: ラスト・ダンス)	July 21, 2013
133	"The Traitor General"; Transliteration: "Uragiri no Jeneraru" (Japanese: 裏切りの将軍)	July 28, 2013
134	"Kingmaker in the Moonlight"; Transliteration: "Gekka no Kingumēkā" (Japanese: 月下のキングメーカー)	August 4, 2013
135	"The Fall of Daiyusha"; Transliteration: "Daiyūsha Otsu" (Japanese: ダイユーシャ堕つ)	August 11, 2013
136	"Yuri's Pendant"; Transliteration: "Yuri no Kunshō" (Japanese: ユリの勲章)	August 18, 2013
137	"Dark Dimensional Combination! "Яeverse" Daiyusha"; Transliteration: "Ankoku Jigen Gattai! Ribāsu Daiyūsha" (Japanese: 暗黒次元合体! "Я" ダイユーシャ)	August 25, 2013
138	"The Depth of Our Bond"; Transliteration: "Kizuna no Fune" (Japanese: 絆の舟)	September 1, 2013
139	"School Camping Trip"; Transliteration: "Rinkan Gakkō" (Japanese: 林間学校)	September 8, 2013
140	"Under the Starry Sky"; Transliteration: "Hoshizora no Shita de..." (Japanese: 星空の下で...)	September 15, 2013
141	"Pirate Flag over Miyaji"; Transliteration: "Miyaji ni Hatameku Kaizoku Hata" (Japanese: 宮地にはためく海賊旗)	September 22, 2013
142	"Kamui's Fists"; Transliteration: "Kamui no Kobushi" (Japanese: カムイの拳)	September 29, 2013
143	"The Ninja Master Returns"; Transliteration: "Ninja Masuta Fukkatsu" (Japanese: ニンジャマスター復活)	October 6, 2013
144	"Rampaging Angel, Rekka!"; Transliteration: "Bōsō Enjeru Rekka" (Japanese: 暴走天使レッカ)	October 13, 2013
145	"Friends"; Transliteration: "Tomodachi" (Japanese: トモダチ)	October 20, 2013
146	"Countdown to Despair"; Transliteration: "Zetsubō e no Kauntodaun" (Japanese: 絶望へのカウントダウン)	October 27, 2013
147	"Chaotic Destroyer"; Transliteration: "Konton no Hakaisha" (Japanese: 混沌の破壊者)	November 3, 2013
148	"The Power Within"; Transliteration: "Sorezore no Ketsui" (Japanese: それぞれの決意)	November 10, 2013
149	"Recapturing Miyaji Academy!"; Transliteration: "Dakkan Seyo!! Miyaji Gakuen" (Japanese: 奪還せよ!! 宮地学園)	November 17, 2013
150	"Total Annihilation!"; Transliteration: "Subete wo Buchiyabure!!" (Japanese: すべてをブチ破れ!!)	November 24, 2013
151	"Aichi and Kamui"; Transliteration: "Aichi to Kamui" (Japanese: アイチとカムイ)	December 1, 2013
152	"The True Form of Friendship"; Transliteration: "Yūjō no Katachi" (Japanese: 友情の形)	December 8, 2013
153	"The Two Leaders"; Transliteration: "Futari no Sendōsha" (Japanese: 二人の先導者)	December 15, 2013
154	"Beyond the Bond"; Transliteration: "Kizuna no Saki ni" (Japanese: 絆の先に)	December 22, 2013
155	"The Two Leons"; Transliteration: "Futari no Reon" (Japanese: 二人のレオン)	December 29, 2013
156	"Breaking the Chains"; Transliteration: "Kusari Tatsumono" (Japanese: 鎖裁つ者)	January 12, 2014
157	"Kourin"; Transliteration: "Kōrin" (Japanese: コーリン)	January 19, 2014
158	"Ren's Wish"; Transliteration: "Ren no Nozomi" (Japanese: レンの望み)	January 26, 2014
159	"Dragon Reborn"; Transliteration: "Saitan no Ryū" (Japanese: 再誕の龍)	February 2, 2014
160	"Perfect Black Ring"; Transliteration: "Kanzen'narishi Kokurin" (Japanese: 完全なりし黒輪)	February 9, 2014
161	"The World's End"; Transliteration: "Wārudo Endo" (Japanese: ワールドエンド)	February 16, 2014
162	"The Intersecting Path"; Transliteration: "Majiwaru Michi" (Japanese: 交わる道)	February 23, 2014
163	"The Connected"; Transliteration: "Tsunagu Mono" (Japanese: 繋ぐもの)	March 2, 2014

=== Season 4: Cardfight!! Vanguard: Legion Mate (2014) ===
No.	Title	Original release date
164	"Missing Leader"; Transliteration: "Kieta Sendōsha" (Japanese: 消(き)えた先(せん)導(どう)者(しゃ))	March 9, 2014
165	"Legion"; Transliteration: "Region" (Japanese: 双闘(レギオン))	March 16, 2014
166	"Aichi's Shadow"; Transliteration: "Aichi no Kage" (Japanese: アイチの影(かげ))	March 23, 2014
167	"Seek the Mate"; Transliteration: "Sīku za Meito" (Japanese: シーク・ザ・メイト)	March 30, 2014
168	"Naoki's Fist"; Transliteration: "Naoki no Kobushi" (Japanese: ナオキの拳(こぶし))	April 6, 2014
169	"Blue Flames Gaillard"; Transliteration: "Aoki Honō no Gaiyāru" (Japanese: 青(あお)き炎(ほのお)のガイヤール)	April 13, 2014
170	"Steel Neve"; Transliteration: "Hagane no Nēvu" (Japanese: 鋼(はがね)のネーヴ)	April 20, 2014
171	"The Leader, Kai"; Transliteration: "Sendōsha Kai" (Japanese: 先(せん)導(どう)者(しゃ)・櫂(かい))	April 27, 2014
172	"Introducing Great Daikaiser!"; Transliteration: "Gurēto Daikaizā Kenzan!" (Japanese: グレートダイカイザー見(けん)参(ざん)！)	May 4, 2014
173	"Illusional Rati"; Transliteration: "Gen'ei no Rati" (Japanese: 幻(げん)影(えい)のラティ)	May 11, 2014
174	"Freezing Ice Serra"; Transliteration: "Itetsuku Kōri no Sera" (Japanese: 凍(い)てつく氷(こおり)のセラ)	May 18, 2014
175	"Ren's Promise"; Transliteration: "Ren no Yakusoku" (Japanese: レンの約(やく)束(そく))	May 25, 2014
176	"The Place Where Aichi Will Return"; Transliteration: "Aichi no Modoru Basho" (Japanese: アイチの戻(もど)る場(ば)所(しょ))	June 1, 2014
177	"The Announced Truth"; Transliteration: "Tsugerareta Shinjitsu" (Japanese: 告(つ)げられた真(しん)実(じつ))	June 8, 2014
178	"Island Awaiting the Wind"; Transliteration: "Kaze no Matsu Shima" (Japanese: 風(かぜ)の待(ま)つ島(しま))	June 15, 2014
179	"Kai's Will"; Transliteration: "Kai no Ishi" (Japanese: 櫂(かい)の意(い)志(し))	June 22, 2014
180	"Gateway to Sanctuary"; Transliteration: "Seīki e no Tobira" (Japanese: 聖(せい)域(いき)への扉(とびら))	June 29, 2014
181	"Manly Big Bang"; Transliteration: "Otokogi Bigu Ban" (Japanese: 男(おとこ)気(ぎ)爆発(ビグバン))	July 6, 2014
182	"Steel Will"; Transliteration: "Hagane no Ishi" (Japanese: 鋼(はがね)の意(い)志(し))	July 13, 2014
183	"What Doesn't Change"; Transliteration: "Kawaranai Mono" (Japanese: かわらないもの)	July 20, 2014
184	"Vow of the Blue Flames"; Transliteration: "Aoki Honō no Chikai" (Japanese: 青(あお)き炎(ほのお)の誓(ちかい)い)	July 27, 2014
185	"Flames of Perdition"; Transliteration: "Rengoku no Honō" (Japanese: 煉(れん)獄(ごく)の炎(ほのお))	August 3, 2014
186	"Interrupted Sleep"; Transliteration: "Tokareta Nemuri" (Japanese: 解(と)かれた眠(ねむ)り)	August 10, 2014
187	"Aichi Awakens"; Transliteration: "Aichi Kakusei" (Japanese: アイチ覚(かく)醒(せい))	August 17, 2014
188	"Cold Ambition"; Transliteration: "Tsumetai Yabō" (Japanese: 冷(つめ)たい野(や)望(ぼう))	August 24, 2014
189	"Omega's Resurrection"; Transliteration: "Fukkatsu no Omega" (Japanese: 復(ふっ)活(かつ)のオメガ)	August 31, 2014
190	"Determination of the Bluish Flames"; Transliteration: "Aoki Honō no Ketsui" (Japanese: 青(あお)き炎(ほのお)の決(けつ)意(い))	September 7, 2014
191	"Our Place"; Transliteration: "Oretachi no Basho" (Japanese: 俺(おれ)達(たち)の場(ば)所(しょ))	September 14, 2014
192	"Pride of the Flames"; Transliteration: "Honō no Iji" (Japanese: 炎(ほのお)の意(い)地(じ))	September 21, 2014
193	"Sword of Destruction"; Transliteration: "Hametsu no Tsurugi" (Japanese: 破(は)滅(めつ)の剣(けん))	September 28, 2014
194	"Sword of Courage"; Transliteration: "Yūki no Tsurugi" (Japanese: 勇(ゆう)気(き)の剣(けん))	October 5, 2014
195	"A Season of Journeys"; Transliteration: "Tabidachi no Kisetsu" (Japanese: 旅(たび)立(だ)ちの季(き)節(せつ))	October 12, 2014
196	"The Vanguards"; Transliteration: "Sendōsha-tachi" (Japanese: 先(せん)導(どう)者(しゃ)たち)	October 19, 2014

== Cardfight!! Vanguard G seasons ==
=== Cardfight!! Vanguard G (2014–2015) ===
No. overall	No. in series	Title	Directed by	Written by	Original release date
197	1	"Chrono Shindou"; Transliteration: "Shindō Kurono" (Japanese: 新導クロノ)	Kana Kawana	Kiyoko Yoshimura	October 26, 2014
198	2	"Kamui Katsuragi"; Transliteration: "Katsuragi Kamui" (Japanese: 葛木カムイ)	Jun Fukuta	Kiyoko Yoshimura	November 2, 2014
199	3	"Kouji Ibuki"; Transliteration: "Ibuki Kōji" (Japanese: 伊吹コウジ)	Toshio Kiuchi	Kenichi Yamada	November 9, 2014
200	4	"Shion Kiba"; Transliteration: "Kiba Shion" (Japanese: 綺場シオン)	Sumito Sasaki	Kazuhiko Inukai	November 16, 2014
201	5	"Tokoha Anjou"; Transliteration: "Anjō Tokoha" (Japanese: 安城トコハ)	Yoshito Hata	Kakuzō Nanmanji	November 23, 2014
202	6	"Mamoru Anjou"; Transliteration: "Anjō Mamoru" (Japanese: 安城マモル)	Ryōsuke Senbo	Miya Asakawa	November 30, 2014
203	7	"Shion's Pride"; Transliteration: "Shion no Hokori" (Japanese: シオンの誇り)	Kana Kawana	Miya Asakawa	December 7, 2014
204	8	"Beautiful Nagisa"; Transliteration: "Uruwashi no Nagisa" (Japanese: 麗しのナギサ)	Jun Fukuta	Kazuhiko Inukai	December 14, 2014
205	9	"Tokoha's Treasure Box / Tokoha's Treasure Chest"; Transliteration: "Tokoha no Takarabako" (Japanese: トコハの宝箱)	Toshio Kiuchi	Kakuzō Nanmanji	December 21, 2014
206	10	"Jaime Alcaraz"; Transliteration: "Haime Arukarasu" (Japanese: ハイメ・アルカラス)	Yoshito Hata	Kenichi Yamada	December 28, 2014
207	11	"Jaime's Card"; Transliteration: "Haime no Kādo" (Japanese: ハイメのカード)	Shūji Miyahara	Kiyoko Yoshimura	January 11, 2015
208	12	"Chrono vs. Jaime"; Transliteration: "Kurono VS Haime" (Japanese: クロノVSハイメ)	Ryōsuke Senbo	Kiyoko Yoshimura	January 18, 2015
209	13	"A Night at Card Capital / Night at Card Capital"; Transliteration: "Kādo Kyapitaru No Yoru" (Japanese: カードキャピタルの夜)	Katsuhiko Bizen	Kazuhiko Inukai	January 25, 2015
210	14	"The Wanderer, Takeru / Takeru the Wanderer"; Transliteration: "Fūraibō Takeru" (Japanese: 風来坊・タケル)	Kana Kawana	Kenichi Yamada	February 1, 2015
211	15	"Ghost Disguise / The Masked Ghost"; Transliteration: "Kamen Gōsuto" (Japanese: 仮面ゴースト)	Yoshito Hata	Kazuhiko Inukai	February 8, 2015
212	16	"Clan Leader Mamoru"; Transliteration: "Kuran Rīdā Mamoru" (Japanese: クランリーダー・マモル)	Jun Fukuta; Keisuke Inoue	Miya Asakawa	February 15, 2015
213	17	"Chrono vs. Tokoha"; Transliteration: "Kurono VS Tokoha" (Japanese: クロノVSトコハ)	Toshio Kiuchi	Kiyoko Yoshimura	February 22, 2015
214	18	"Vortex Cupid"; Transliteration: "Uzumaki Kyūpiddo" (Japanese: うずまきキューピッド)	Kazuomi Koga	Ayumu Hisao	March 1, 2015
215	19	"The Power of Bonds! X-tiger"; Transliteration: "Kizuna no Chikara! Ekusutaigā" (Japanese: 絆の力！エクスタイガー)	Ryōsuke Senbo	Kakuzō Nanmanji	March 8, 2015
216	20	"Still Unnamed"; Transliteration: "Mada Nai Namae" (Japanese: まだない名前)	Yoshito Hata	Kazuhiko Inukai	March 15, 2015
217	21	"Fake Fight"; Transliteration: "Itsuwari no Faito" (Japanese: 偽りのファイト)	Katsuhiko Bizen	Kiyoko Yoshimura	March 22, 2015
218	22	"Messiah"; Transliteration: "Mesaia" (Japanese: メサイア)	Masahiro Sonoda	Kenichi Yamada	March 29, 2015
219	23	"The Dark Ones"; Transliteration: "Dāku wa Yatsura" (Japanese: ダークな奴ら)	Shingo Okano	Miya Asakawa	April 5, 2015
220	24	"Kouji vs. Mamoru / Ibuki vs. Mamoru"; Transliteration: "Ibuki VS Mamoru" (Japanese: 伊吹VSマモル)	Toshio Kiuchi	Kazuhiko Inukai	April 12, 2015
221	25	"Birth of a Team"; Transliteration: "Chīmu Tanjō" (Japanese: チーム誕生)	Yoshito Hata	Ayumu Hisao	April 19, 2015
222	26	"Taiyou Asukawa"; Transliteration: "Asukawa Taiyou" (Japanese: 明日川タイヨウ)	Jun Hatori	Kiyoko Yoshimura	April 26, 2015
223	27	"Yuichirou Kanzaki"; Transliteration: "Kanzaki Yūichirō" (Japanese: 神崎ユウイチロウ)	Ryōsuke Senbo	Kazuhiko Inukai	May 3, 2015
224	28	"Again, The Wanderer"; Transliteration: "Fūraibō, Futatabi" (Japanese: 風来坊、再び)	Katsuhiko Bizen	Kazuhiko Inukai	May 10, 2015
225	29	"Team Demise"; Transliteration: "Chīmu Dimaizu" (Japanese: チーム・ディマイズ)	Yukio Kuroda	Ayumu Hisao	May 17, 2015
226	30	"Rin Hashima"; Transliteration: "Hashima Rin" (Japanese: 羽島リン)	Yoshito Hata	Miya Asakawa	May 24, 2015
227	31	"Shouma Shinonome"; Transliteration: "Shinonome Shōma" (Japanese: 東雲ショウマ)	Eiichi Kuboyama	Kiyoko Yoshimura	May 31, 2015
228	32	"Beginning of a Long Summer"; Transliteration: "Nagai Natsu no Hajimari" (Japanese: 長い夏の始まり)	Junichirō Hashiguchi	Kenichi Yamada	June 7, 2015
229	33	"Chrono vs. Shion"; Transliteration: "Kurono VS Shion" (Japanese: クロノVSシオン)	Jun Hatori	Kazuhiko Inukai	June 14, 2015
230	34	"Magallanica's Mermaid Princess"; Transliteration: "Megaranika no Ningyo Hime" (Japanese: メガラニカの人魚姫)	Ryōsuke Senbo	Daisuke Ishibashi	June 21, 2015
231	35	"Shin Nitta"; Transliteration: "Nitta Shin" (Japanese: 新田シン)	Yūsuke Onoda	Ayumu Hisao	June 28, 2015
232	36	"United Sanctuary"; Transliteration: "Yunaiteddo Sankuchuari" (Japanese: ユナイテッド・サンクチュアリ)	Yoshito Hata	Kazuhiko Inukai	July 5, 2015
233	37	"Dog Trainer"; Transliteration: "Doggu Torēnā" (Japanese: ドッグトレーナー)	Katsuhiko Bizen	Kazuhiko Inukai	July 12, 2015
234	38	"Miracle Card"; Transliteration: "Kiseki no Kādo" (Japanese: 奇跡のカード)	Toshio Kiuchi	Kiyoko Yoshimura	July 19, 2015
235	39	"Solar Eclipse"; Transliteration: "Nisshoku" (Japanese: 日蝕)	Masahiro Sonoda	Ayumu Hisao	August 2, 2015
236	40	"Nextage"; Transliteration: "Nekusutēji" (Japanese: ネクステージ)	Yoshito Hata	Kenichi Yamada	August 9, 2015
237	41	"Tokoha vs. Rin"; Transliteration: "Tokoha VS Rin" (Japanese: トコハVSリン)	Yukio Kuroda	Miya Asakawa	August 16, 2015
238	42	"Shion vs. Shouma"; Transliteration: "Shion VS Shōma" (Japanese: シオンVSショウマ)	Jun Hatori	Kazuhiko Inukai	August 23, 2015
239	43	"Depend Card / Stride Force"; Transliteration: "Sutoraido Fōsu" (Japanese: ストライドフォース)	Toshihiro Maeya	Kiyoko Yoshimura	August 30, 2015
240	44	"Chrono vs. Taiyou"; Transliteration: "Kurono VS Taiyō" (Japanese: クロノVSタイョウ)	Katsuhiko Bizen	Daisuke Ishibashi	September 6, 2015
241	45	"Miracle / Chrono vs. Kanzaki"; Transliteration: "Kurono VS Kanzaki" (Japanese: クロノVS神崎)	Junichirō Hashiguchi	Kenichi Yamada	September 13, 2015
242	46	"The Power to Transcend"; Transliteration: "Chōetsu Suru Chikara" (Japanese: 超越する力)	Yoshito Hata	Ayumu Hisao	September 20, 2015
243	47	"Chrono vs. Kouji / Chrono vs. Ibuki"; Transliteration: "Kurono VS Ibuki" (Japanese: クロノVS伊吹)	Yūsuke Onoda	Kazuhiko Inukai	September 27, 2015
244	48	"Deciding Battle / Conclusion"; Transliteration: "Ketchaku" (Japanese: 決着)	Toshio Kiuchi	Kiyoko Yoshimura	October 4, 2015

=== Cardfight!! Vanguard G: GIRS Crisis (2015–2016) ===
No. overall	No. in series	Title	Directed by	Written by	Original release date
245	49	"Quest Begins! / The G Quest Begins!"; Transliteration: "Ji Kuesuto Kaimaku!" (Japanese: Gクエスト開幕！)	Ryōsuke Senbo	Kazuhiko Inukai	October 11, 2015
246	50	"Special Aqua Force"; Transliteration: "Supesharu Akua Fōsu" (Japanese: スペシャルアクアフォース)	Masahiro Sonoda	Kiyoko Yoshimura	October 18, 2015
247	51	"Chrono vs. Leon"; Transliteration: "Kurono VS Reon" (Japanese: クロノVSレオン)	Yukio Kuroda	Kazuhiko Inukai	October 25, 2015
248	52	"Ace's Trap"; Transliteration: "Ēsu no Wana" (Japanese: エースの罠)	Masahiko Matsunaga	Kiyoko Yoshimura	November 1, 2015
249	53	"Rummy Labyrinth"; Transliteration: "Ramī Rabirinsu" (Japanese: ラミーラビリンス)	Junichirō Hashiguchi	Miya Asakawa	November 8, 2015
250	54	"A Stormy Night"; Transliteration: "Arashi no Yoru" (Japanese: 嵐の夜)	Yūsuke Onoda	Daisuke Ishibashi	November 15, 2015
251	55	"Shion's Awakening"; Transliteration: "Kakusei no Shion" (Japanese: 覚醒のシオン)	Ryōsuke Senbo	Ayumu Hisao	November 22, 2015
252	56	"A Place of Chance Meetings"; Transliteration: "Meguriau Basho" (Japanese: めぐりあう場所)	Yukio Kuroda	Kenichi Yamada	November 29, 2015
253	57	"Zoo Branch"; Transliteration: "Zū Shibu" (Japanese: Zoo支部)	Toshio Kiuchi	Kiyoko Yoshimura	December 6, 2015
254	58	"Legendary "D""; Transliteration: "Densetsu no Dī" (Japanese: 伝説のD)	Masahiro Sonoda	Kazuhiko Inukai	December 13, 2015
255	59	"Naked Fight"; Transliteration: "Hadaka no Faito" (Japanese: 裸のファイト)	Masahiko Matsunaga	Kiyoko Yoshimura	December 20, 2015
256	60	"Kai's Lightning"; Transliteration: "Kai no Inazuma" (Japanese: 櫂のイナズマ)	Yūsuke Onoda	Daisuke Ishibashi	December 27, 2015
257	61	"Kouji's Miscalculation / Ibuki's Miscalculation"; Transliteration: "Ibuki no Gosan" (Japanese: 伊吹の誤算)	Yoshitaka Nagaoka	Ayumu Hisao	January 10, 2016
258	62	"Card Capital #1"; Transliteration: "Kādo Kyapitaru Ichigōten" (Japanese: カードキャピタル一号店)	Junichirō Hashiguchi	Miya Asakawa	January 17, 2016
259	63	"Mikuru Shindou"; Transliteration: "Shindō Mikuru" (Japanese: 新導ミクル)	Ryōsuke Senbo	Kenichi Yamada	January 24, 2016
260	64	"Vanguard Girls' Meet"; Transliteration: "Vangādo Joshikai" (Japanese: ヴァンガード女子会)	Toshio Kiuchi	Kazuhiko Inukai	January 31, 2016
261	65	"Shion vs. Ace"; Transliteration: "Shion VS Ēsu" (Japanese: シオンVSエース)	Fumihiro Ueno	Kiyoko Yoshimura	February 7, 2016
262	66	"TRY3 vs Asteroid / TRY3 vs. AL4"; Transliteration: "Toraisurī VS Erufō" (Japanese: トライスリーVSAL4)	Yoshitaka Nagaoka	Kazuhiko Inukai	February 14, 2016
263	67	"Chrono vs. Ren"; Transliteration: "Kurono VS Ren" (Japanese: クロノVSレン)	Masahiro Sonoda	Ayumu Hisao	February 21, 2016
264	68	"Darkness of the Association"; Transliteration: "Fukyū Kyōkai no Yami" (Japanese: 普及協会の闇)	Masahiko Matsunaga	Daisuke Ishibashi	February 28, 2016
265	69	"Dark Zone's Trap"; Transliteration: "Dāku Zōn Shibu no Wana" (Japanese: ダークゾーン支部の罠)	Kenichi Maejima	Kiyoko Yoshimura	March 6, 2016
266	70	"Night Before the Showdown"; Transliteration: "Kessen Zenya" (Japanese: 決戦前夜)	Junichirō Hashiguchi	Miya Asakawa; Kiyoko Yoshimura	March 13, 2016
267	71	"Showdown! Team Q4 - Tokoha vs. Misaki"; Transliteration: "Kessen! Chīmu Q4 Tokoha VS Misaki" (Japanese: 決戦！チームQ4 トコハVSミサキ)	Yūsuke Onoda	Kenichi Yamada	March 20, 2016
268	72	"Shion vs. Kai"; Transliteration: "Shion VS Kai" (Japanese: シオンVS櫂)	Eiichi Kuboyama	Ayumu Hisao	March 27, 2016
269	73	"Chrono vs. Kamui"; Transliteration: "Kurono VS Kamui" (Japanese: クロノVSカムイ)	Fumihiro Ueno	Kiyoko Yoshimura	April 3, 2016
270	74	"GIRS Crisis"; Transliteration: "Giāsu Kuraishisu" (Japanese: ギアースクライシス)	Toshio Kiuchi	Kiyoko Yoshimura	April 10, 2016

=== Cardfight!! Vanguard G: Stride Gate (2016) ===
No. overall	No. in series	Title	Directed by	Written by	Original release date
271	75	"Storm Ryuzu's Lab!"; Transliteration: "Totsunyū! Ryūzu Rabo" (Japanese: 突入！リューズ・ラボ)	Kenichi Maejima	Kazuhiko Inukai	April 17, 2016
272	76	"Ryuzu Myoujin"; Transliteration: "Myōjin Ryūzu" (Japanese: 明神リューズ)	Masahiko Matsunaga	Kazuhiko Inukai	April 24, 2016
273	77	"Hiroki Moriyama"; Transliteration: "Moriyama Hiroki" (Japanese: 守山ヒロキ)	Eiichi Kuboyama	Daisuke Ishibashi	May 1, 2016
274	78	"Reunion with Kanzaki"; Transliteration: "Kanzaki to no Saikai" (Japanese: 神崎との再会)	Yūsuke Onoda	Miya Asakawa	May 8, 2016
275	79	"Taiyou vs. Hiroki"; Transliteration: "Taiyō tai Hiroki" (Japanese: タイヨウVSヒロキ)	Fumihiro Ueno	Ayumu Hisao	May 15, 2016
276	80	"Collapse of the Dragon Empire Branch"; Transliteration: "Doragon Empaia Shibu Hōkai" (Japanese: ドラゴンエンパイア支部崩壊)	Junichirō Hashiguchi	Kiyoko Yoshimura	May 22, 2016
277	81	"An Ill-Tempered Visitor"; Transliteration: "Fukigen na Mimaikyaku" (Japanese: 不機嫌な見舞客)	Ryōsuke Senbo	Kazuhiko Inukai	May 29, 2016
278	82	"Chrono's Memory"; Transliteration: "Kurono no Kioku" (Japanese: クロノの記憶)	Eiichi Kuboyama	Kiyoko Yoshimura	June 5, 2016
279	83	"Awakening of the Depend Card"; Transliteration: "Dipendo Kādo Kakusei" (Japanese: ディペンドカード覚醒)	Masahiko Matsunaga	Kiyoko Yoshimura	June 12, 2016
280	84	"Triangle of Divas"; Transliteration: "Utahime no Torianguru" (Japanese: 歌姫の三重奏(トライアングル))	Yūsuke Onoda	Daisuke Ishibashi	June 19, 2016
281	85	"The Trio, Once More"; Transliteration: "Sannin de, Futatabi" (Japanese: 三人で、再び)	Nobuyoshi Nagayama	Daisuke Ishibashi	June 26, 2016
282	86	"Rive and Ryuzu"; Transliteration: "Raibu to Ryūzu" (Japanese: ライブとリューズ)	Toshio Kiuchi	Kazuhiko Inukai	July 3, 2016
283	87	"Promise"; Transliteration: "Yakusoku" (Japanese: 約束)	Kiyomitsu Satō	Kiyoko Yoshimura	July 10, 2016
284	88	"Trinity Dragon's Fierce Battle"; Transliteration: "Gekitou! Toriniti Doragon" (Japanese: 激闘！トリニティドラゴン)	Ryōsuke Senbo	Miya Asakawa; Kazuhiko Inukai	July 17, 2016
285	89	"Enishi vs. Am"; Transliteration: "Enishi VS Amu" (Japanese: 江西VSアム)	Yūsuke Onoda	Kazuhiko Inukai	July 24, 2016
286	90	"Shinonome's Joy"; Transliteration: "Shinonome no Yuetsu" (Japanese: 東雲の愉悦)	Yukio Kuroda	Kazuhiko Inukai	July 31, 2016
287	91	"Perfect Future"; Transliteration: "Kanzen'naru Mirai" (Japanese: 完全なる未来)	Junichirō Hashiguchi	Kiyoko Yoshimura	August 7, 2016
288	92	"Time of Judgment"; Transliteration: "Shinpan no Toki" (Japanese: 審判の刻)	Nobuyoshi Nagayama	Kiyoko Yoshimura	August 14, 2016
289	93	"Deus Ex Machina"; Transliteration: "Kikaijikake no Kami" (Japanese: 機械仕掛けの神)	Masahiro Sonoda	Ayumu Hisao	August 21, 2016
290	94	"Blazing Sword"; Transliteration: "Kōki no Ken" (Japanese: 光輝の剣)	Ryōsuke Senbo	Kazuhiko Inukai	August 28, 2016
291	95	"True Feelings"; Transliteration: "Hontō no Kimochi" (Japanese: 本当の気持ち)	Yūsuke Onoda	Kazuhiko Inukai	September 4, 2016
292	96	"Chrono vs. Ryuzu"; Transliteration: "Kurono VS Ryūzu" (Japanese: クロノVSリューズ)	Toshio Kiuchi	Kiyoko Yoshimura	September 11, 2016
293	97	"Future Beyond Imagination"; Transliteration: "Imēji o Koeta Mirai" (Japanese: イメージを超えた未来)	Masahiko Matsunaga	Kiyoko Yoshimura	September 18, 2016
294	98	"NEXT STAGE"	Nobuyoshi Nagayama	Kiyoko Yoshimura	September 25, 2016

=== Cardfight!! Vanguard G: NEXT (2016–2017) ===
No. overall	No. in series	Title	Directed by	Written by	Original release date
295 (99)	1	"Welcome to the NEXT STAGE!!"	Kō Nakagawa	Kazuhiko Inukai	October 2, 2016
296 (100)	2	"Dragon Awaiting Awakening"; Transliteration: "Kakusei wo Motsu Ryū" (Japanese: 覚醒を待つ竜)	Yūsuke Suzuki	Ayumu Hisao	October 9, 2016
297 (101)	3	"Kazuma's Ritual"; Transliteration: "Kazuma no Richuaru" (Japanese: カズマの儀式(リチュアル))	Yūki Arie	Hiroshi Yamaguchi	October 16, 2016
298 (102)	4	"The "Ki" Prince of Fukuhara"; Transliteration: "Fukuhara no "Ki" Kōshi" (Japanese: 福原の「綺」公子)	Kazuhide Kondō	Kenji Konuta	October 23, 2016
299 (103)	5	"Smile of Queen and Schemes"; Transliteration: "Joō to Sakubō no Hohoemi" (Japanese: 女王と策謀の微笑み)	Yūsuke Onoda	Atsuo Ishino	October 30, 2016
300 (104)	6	"Crossover"; Transliteration: "Kurosuōbā" (Japanese: クロスオーバー)	Hiroshi Kimura	Ayumu Hisao	November 6, 2016
301 (105)	7	"My Future In Bloom"; Transliteration: "Kaika-suru Watashi no Mirai" (Japanese: 開花する私の未来)	Atsushi Nakayama	Kazuhiko Inukai	November 13, 2016
302 (106)	8	"Overcoming the Sea of Tears"; Transliteration: "Namida no Umi o Koete" (Japanese: 涙の海を越えて)	Masayuki Yamada	Kenji Konuta	November 20, 2016
303 (107)	9	"The Flower Will Bloom Radiantly"; Transliteration: "Hana wa Mabushiku Sakihokoru" (Japanese: 花は眩しく咲き誇る)	Yoshitaka Fujimoto	Atsuo Ishino	November 27, 2016
304 (108)	10	"An Unsurpassable Existence"; Transliteration: "Koerarenai Mono" (Japanese: 超えられない存在(モノ))	Michita Shiraishi	Ayumu Hisao	December 4, 2016
305 (109)	11	"To Me, You Are...!!"; Transliteration: "Ore ha Omae no...!!" (Japanese: 俺はお前の…！)	Yoshitaka Makino	Kiyoko Yoshimura	December 11, 2016
306 (110)	12	"The Last Chance"; Transliteration: "Saigo no Chansu" (Japanese: 最後のチャンス)	Ryōsuke Azuma	Kazuhiko Inukai	December 18, 2016
307 (111)	13	"Decisive Battle!!! Striders vs. Trinity Dragon!!!"; Transliteration: "Kessen!!! Sutoraidāzu VS Toriniti Doragon!!!" (Japanese: 決戦!!! ストライダーズVSトリニティドラゴン!!!)	Shigeharu Takahashi	Kenji Konuta	December 25, 2016
308 (112)	14	"Are you ready to FIGHT!!"	Yukio Kuroda	Kazuhiko Inukai	January 8, 2017
309 (113)	15	"Battlefield!! First Stage"; Transliteration: "Ransen!! Fāsuto sutēji" (Japanese: 乱戦!! ファーストステージ)	Yoshitaka Fujimoto	Atsuo Ishino	January 15, 2017
310 (114)	16	"Dawn of Nippon"; Transliteration: "Nippon no Yoake" (Japanese: ニッポンの夜明け)	Yūsuke Suzuki; Kazuki Horiguchi	Ayumu Hisao	January 22, 2017
311 (115)	17	"Signpost of Light"; Transliteration: "Hikari no Michishirube" (Japanese: 光の道標)	Yoshihiko Iwata	Kiyoko Yoshimura	January 29, 2017
312 (116)	18	"Mano A Mano"; Transliteration: "Otoko to Otoko" (Japanese: 漢と漢)	Nobuyoshi Nagayama	Kazuhiko Inukai	February 5, 2017
313 (117)	19	"Skyscraper of Craving"; Transliteration: "Katsubō no Matenrō" (Japanese: 渇望の摩天楼)	Akimi Fudesaka	Ayumu Hisao	February 12, 2017
314 (118)	20	"Unyielding Pirate"; Transliteration: "Fukutsu no Kaizokuki" (Japanese: 不屈の海賊姫)	Tatsunari Oyano; Ryōsuke Azuma	Atsuo Ishino	February 19, 2017
315 (119)	21	"Fascinating Magia"; Transliteration: "Miwaku no Magia" (Japanese: 魅惑の奇術(マギア))	Daisuke Tsukushi	Kenji Konuta	February 26, 2017
316 (120)	22	"Creeping Menace"; Transliteration: "Shinobiyoru Kyōi" (Japanese: 忍び寄る脅威)	Seiji Morita	Kiyoko Yoshimura	March 5, 2017
317 (121)	23	"Strong, Violent, and Beautiful"; Transliteration: "Tsuyoku Hageshiku Utsushiku" (Japanese: 強く激しく美しく)	Shigeharu Takahashi	Kazuhiko Inukai	March 12, 2017
318 (122)	24	"The Knights Swear Victory Upon Their Swords"; Transliteration: "Kishi wa Tsurugi ni Shōri o Chikau" (Japanese: 騎士は剣に勝利を誓う)	Ryōsuke Azuma	Ayumu Hisao	March 19, 2017
319 (123)	25	"Chaos of the End"; Transliteration: "Shūmaku no Kaosu" (Japanese: 終幕のカオス)	Yoshitaka Fujimoto	Kiyoko Yoshimura	March 26, 2017
320 (124)	26	"Return of the Vanguard!" (Japanese: 帰還の先導者(ヴァンガード))	Nobuyoshi Nagayama	Ayumu Hisao	April 2, 2017
321 (125)	27	"Chrono vs. Aichi"; Transliteration: "Kurono tai Aichi" (Japanese: クロノVSアイチ)	Sumito Sasaki	Kazuhiko Inukai	April 9, 2017
322 (126)	28	"Ibuki's Trial"; Transliteration: "Ibuki no Shiren" (Japanese: 伊吹の試練)	Takeyuki Satohara; Noriyuki Nakamura	Kiyoko Yoshimura	April 16, 2017
323 (127)	29	"Diffrider From Another World"; Transliteration: "Isekai kara no Difuraidā" (Japanese: 異世界からの憑依者(ディフライダー))	Naoki Hishikawa	Kiyoko Yoshimura	April 23, 2017
324 (128)	30	"The Light from Before"; Transliteration: "Ano Hi Mita Kagayaki" (Japanese: あの日見た輝き)	Yoshito Hata	Atsuo Ishino	April 30, 2017
325 (129)	31	"Fragile Living Things"; Transliteration: "Zeijaku Naru Seibutsu-tachi" (Japanese: 脆弱なる生物達)	Shigeharu Takahashi	Kenji Konuta	May 7, 2017
326 (130)	32	"Evil Eye Sovereign"; Transliteration: "Yokoshima me no Shihai-sha" (Japanese: 邪眼の支配者)	Masashi Abe	Kazuhiko Inukai	May 14, 2017
327 (131)	33	"Potential of Humans"; Transliteration: "Ningen no Kanōsei" (Japanese: 人間の可能性)	Yoshitaka Fujimoto	Ayumu Hisao	May 21, 2017
328 (132)	34	"Brothers' Reunion"; Transliteration: "Ani to no Saikai" (Japanese: 兄との再会)	Ichizō Kobayashi	Kiyoko Yoshimura	May 28, 2017
329 (133)	35	"Liberation from Destiny"; Transliteration: "Unmei no Kaihō" (Japanese: 運命の解放)	Seiji Morita	Kiyoko Yoshimura	June 4, 2017
330 (134)	36	"Fukuhara's Choice"; Transliteration: "Fukuhara no Sentaku" (Japanese: 福原の選択)	Ryūtarō Suzuki	Atsuo Ishino	June 11, 2017
331 (135)	37	"Our Vanguard"; Transliteration: "Oretachi no Vu~angādo" (Japanese: 俺達のヴァンガード)	Naoki Hishikawa	Ayumu Hisao	June 18, 2017
332 (136)	38	"Beyond this Sky"; Transliteration: "Kono Sora no Saki ni" (Japanese: この空の先に)	Tomoya Takahashi	Kazuhiko Inukai	June 25, 2017
333 (137)	39	"Beacon of Revival"; Transliteration: "Fukkatsu no Noroshi" (Japanese: 復活の狼煙)	Noriyuki Nakamura	Kenji Konuta	July 2, 2017
334 (138)	40	"Oath of Striders"; Transliteration: "Sutoraidāzu no Chikai" (Japanese: ストライダーズの誓い)	Itsuro Kawasaki	Atsuo Ishino	July 9, 2017
335 (139)	41	"Fukuhara High Vanguard Club VS Team Diffrider"; Transliteration: "Fukuhara Kōkō Vu~angādo-bu VS Chīmu Difuraidā" (Japanese: 福原高校ヴァンガード部VSチーム・ディフライダー)	Kei Miura	Kazuhiko Inukai	July 16, 2017
336 (140)	42	"Overcoming Heaven's Decree"; Transliteration: "Tenmei o Koete" (Japanese: 天命を超えて)	Yoshitaka Fujimoto	Kiyoko Yoshimura	July 23, 2017
337 (141)	43	"Striders VS Jaime Flowers"; Transliteration: "Sutoraidāzu VS Haime Furawāzu" (Japanese: ストライダーズVSハイメフラワーズ)	Fumihiro Ueno	Atsuo Ishino	July 30, 2017
338 (142)	44	"Heat of Searing Heart"; Transliteration: "Munewokogasu Atsu-sa" (Japanese: 胸を焦がす熱さ)	Seiji Morita	Ayumu Hisao	August 6, 2017
339 (143)	45	"Special Training with Kanzaki"; Transliteration: "Kanzaki to no Tokkun" (Japanese: 神崎との特訓)	Kaoru Yabana	Kazuhiko Inukai	August 13, 2017
340 (144)	46	"Verno's Challenge"; Transliteration: "Beruno no Chōsen" (Japanese: ベルノの挑戦)	Naoki Hishikawa	Kiyoko Yoshimura	August 20, 2017
341 (145)	47	"To the Limit of Radiance"; Transliteration: "Kagayaki no Hate ni" (Japanese: 輝きの果てに)	Ryūtarō Suzuki	Kenji Konuta	August 27, 2017
342 (146)	48	"Dragon's Awakening"; Transliteration: "Kakusei no Ryū" (Japanese: 覚醒の竜)	Yoshihiko Iwata	Atsuo Ishino	September 3, 2017
343 (147)	49	"Battle of the Brothers"; Transliteration: "Kyōdai Kessen" (Japanese: 兄弟決戦)	Noriyuki Nakamura	Ayumu Hisao	September 10, 2017
344 (148)	50	"Entrusted Wishes"; Transliteration: "Takusareta Omoi" (Japanese: 託された思い)	Yoshitaka Fujimoto	Kiyoko Yoshimura	September 17, 2017
345 (149)	51	"Power to Surpass"; Transliteration: "Koeru Chikara" (Japanese: 超える力)	Seiji Morita; Ryūtarō Suzuki	Kiyoko Yoshimura	September 24, 2017
346 (150)	52	"Return"; Transliteration: "Kikan" (Japanese: 帰還)	Kō Nakagawa	Kiyoko Yoshimura	October 1, 2017

=== Cardfight!! Vanguard G: Z (2017-2018) ===
No. overall	No. in season	Title	Directed by	Written by	Original release date
347 (151)	1	"Chrono Taken"; Transliteration: "Ubawareta Kurono" (Japanese: 奪われたクロノ)	Fumio Itō	Kazuhiko Inukai	October 8, 2017
348 (152)	2	"A Written Challenge from the Apostle"; Transliteration: "Shito kara no chōsen-jō" (Japanese: 使徒からの挑戦状)	Yūshi Suzuki	Kazuhiko Inukai	October 15, 2017
349 (153)	3	"Blue Wave Marshal, Valeos"; Transliteration: "Aoba gensui Vareosu" (Japanese: 蒼波元帥ヴァレオス)	Shunichi Katō	Kenichi Yamada	October 22, 2017
350 (154)	4	"Zeroth Dragon"; Transliteration: "Zerosu Doragon" (Japanese: ゼロスドラゴン)	Takahiro Majima	Ayumu Hisao	October 29, 2017
351 (155)	5	"Dragon Burning with Vengeance"; Transliteration: "Fukushū ni moeru ryū" (Japanese: 復讐に燃える竜)	Yūshi Suzuki	Kenji Konuta	November 5, 2017
352 (156)	6	"Purging Overlord"; Transliteration: "Shukusei no Ōbārōdo" (Japanese: 粛清のオーバーロード)	Takayuki Murakami	Atsuo Ishino	November 12, 2017
353 (157)	7	"Relics Crisis"; Transliteration: "Rerikusu Kuraishisu" (Japanese: レリクス・クライシス)	Fumio Itō	Kenichi Yamada	November 19, 2017
354 (158)	8	"The Future We Secured"; Transliteration: "Watashitachi ga tsukanda mirai" (Japanese: 私たちがつかんだ未来)	Noriyuki Nakamura	Kazuhiko Inukai	November 26, 2017
355 (159)	9	"Evil Governor Gredora"; Transliteration: "Hyakugai Joō Guredōra" (Japanese: 百害女王グレドーラ)	Yūshi Suzuki	Kiyoko Yoshimura	December 3, 2017
356 (160)	10	"The Man's Finishing Hold"; Transliteration: "Otoko no Finisshu Hōrudo" (Japanese: 漢のフィニッシュホールド)	Fumio Itō	Ayumu Hisao	December 10, 2017
357 (161)	11	"Evil God Bishop Gastille"; Transliteration: "Jashin shikyō gasutīru" (Japanese: 邪神司教ガスティール)	Takahiro Majima	Atsuo Ishino	December 17, 2017
358 (162)	12	"The Curse Known as Fate"; Transliteration: "Unmei to iu na no noroi" (Japanese: 運命という名の呪い)	Osamu Sekita	Ayumu Hisao	December 24, 2017
359 (163)	13	"The Vessel of Gyze"; Transliteration: "Gīze no utsuwa" (Japanese: ギーゼの器)	Fumio Maezono	Kenji Konuta	January 7, 2018
360 (164)	14	"The Beginning of the End"; Transliteration: "Owari no hajimari" (Japanese: 終わりの始まり)	Takayuki Murakami	Kazuhiko Inukai	January 14, 2018
361 (165)	15	"Sworn Fight"; Transliteration: "Chikai no Faito" (Japanese: 誓いのファイト)	Fumio Itō	Kiyoko Yoshimura	January 21, 2018
362 (166)	16	"The Hope In Our Hands"; Transliteration: "Bokutachi ga te ni shita kibō" (Japanese: 僕たちが手にした希望)	Noriyuki Nakamura	Kazuhiko Inukai	January 28, 2018
363 (167)	17	"The Land of Descent"; Transliteration: "Kōrin no ji" (Japanese: 降臨の地)	Yūshi Suzuki	Ayumu Hisao	February 4, 2018
364 (168)	18	"Dawn of the Decisive Battle"; Transliteration: "Kessen no makuake" (Japanese: 決戦の幕開け)	Naoto Hashimoto	Kenichi Yamada	February 11, 2018
365 (169)	19	"Choice of the Jester"; Transliteration: "Dōkeshi no sentaku" (Japanese: 道化師の選択)	Fumio Itō	Kiyoko Yoshimura	February 18, 2018
366 (170)	20	"Dragon Deity of Destruction, Gyze"; Transliteration: "Hakai no Ryūjin Gīze" (Japanese: 破壊の竜神 ギーゼ)	Fumio Maezono	Ayumu Hisao	March 4, 2018
367 (171)	21	"Void and Vanguard"; Transliteration: "Kyomu to sendō-sha" (Japanese: 虚無と先導者)	Osamu Sekita	Kazuhiko Inukai	March 11, 2018
368 (172)	22	"TRY3"; Transliteration: "Toraisurī" (Japanese: 挑戦する3人(トライスリー))	Takayuki Murakami	Kiyoko Yoshimura	March 18, 2018
369 (173)	23	"Dimensional Overstride"; Transliteration: "Dimenshonaru Ōbāsutoraido" (Japanese: 時空超越)	Yūshi Suzuki	Kiyoko Yoshimura	March 25, 2018
370 (174)	24	"EXTRA TURN"	Naoto Hashimoto; Kazuki Yokouchi; Akira Tsunoda	Ayumu Hisao; Kazuhiko Inukai; Kiyoko Yoshimura	April 1, 2018

== Cardfight!! Vanguard 2018 reboot series ==
=== Cardfight!! Vanguard (2018–2019) ===
No. overall	No. in season	Title	Original release date	English air date
371	1	"Stand Up, Vanguard!!"; Transliteration: "Sutando Appu Vangādo!!" (Japanese: スタンドアップ・ヴァンガード!!)	May 5, 2018	May 26, 2018
372	2	"Ride the Vanguard!!"; Transliteration: "Raido Za Vangādo!!" (Japanese: ライド・ザ・ヴァンガード!!)	May 12, 2018	June 2, 2018
373	3	"Who's the Strongest Cardfighter!!"; Transliteration: "Saikyō Faitā wa Dareda!!" (Japanese: 最強ファイターは誰だ!!)	May 19, 2018	June 9, 2018
374	4	"Misaki's Secret!!"; Transliteration: "Misaki no Himitsu!!" (Japanese: ミサキのひみつ!!)	May 26, 2018	June 16, 2018
375	5	"Let's Go To Card Capital!!"; Transliteration: "Kaado Kyapitaru ni ikou!!" (Japanese: カードキャピタルに行こう!!)	June 2, 2018	July 7, 2018
376	6	"Declaration of War!! Battle of the Shops"; Transliteration: "Sensen Fukoku!! Shoppu Taikō-sen" (Japanese: 宣戦布告!! ショップ対抗戦)	June 9, 2018	July 14, 2018
377	7	"Unite!! Q4 (Quadrifoglio)"; Transliteration: "Kessei!! Kuadoriforio" (Japanese: 結成!! Q4(クアドリフォリオ))	June 16, 2018	July 23, 2018
378	8	"Turbulence!! Q4 VS NwO"; Transliteration: "Haran!! Kuadoriforio Buiesu Nagisa Uizu Azāzu" (Japanese: 波乱!! Q4 VS NwO(ナギサウィズアザーズ))	June 23, 2018	July 30, 2018
379	9	"Kai Loses!!"; Transliteration: "Kai, yabureru!!" (Japanese: 櫂(かい), 敗れる!!)	June 30, 2018	August 4, 2018
380	10	"Wind of Aichi!!"; Transliteration: "Aichi no kaze!!" (Japanese: アイチの風!!)	July 7, 2018	August 11, 2018
381	11	"Battle of Men!!"; Transliteration: "Otokotachi no Tatakai!!" (Japanese: 男たちの戦い!!)	July 14, 2018	August 18, 2018
382	12	"Mysterious Enemy Asteroid!!"; Transliteration: "Nazo no Teki Fūfaitā!!" (Japanese: 謎の敵・フーファイター!!)	July 21, 2018	August 25, 2018
383	13	"Kamui!! Revenge of Determination"; Transliteration: "Kamui!! Ketchaku no Ribenji!!" (Japanese: カムイ!! 決着のリベンジ!!)	July 28, 2018	September 1, 2018
384	14	"Awakening!! PSYQualia"; Transliteration: "Kakusei!! Saikuoria" (Japanese: 覚醒!! PSY(サイ)クオリア)	August 4, 2018	September 8, 2018
385	15	"FRIEND"; Transliteration: "Furendo" (Japanese: FRIEND(フレンド))	August 11, 2018	September 15, 2018
386	16	"Their Respective Feelings"; Transliteration: "Sorezore no Omoi" (Japanese: それぞれの想い)	August 18, 2018	September 22, 2018
387	17	"A Jet Black Knight!! Blaster Dark"; Transliteration: "Shikkoku no Kishi!! Burasutā Dāku" (Japanese: 漆黒の騎士!!ブラスター・ダーク)	August 25, 2018	September 29, 2018
388	18	"Kai, Ren, and Aichi too" Transliteration: "Kai to Ren, soshite Aichi" (Japanese: 櫂(かい)とレン, そしてアイチ)	September 1, 2018	October 06, 2018
389	19	"Tetsu's Motive"; Transliteration: "Tetsu no Omowaku" (Japanese: テツの思惑)	September 8, 2018	October 13, 2018
390	20	"Reunion"; Transliteration: "Saikai" (Japanese: サイカイ)	September 15, 2018	October 20, 2018
391	21	"Abyss of Darkness"; Transliteration: "Yami no Shin'en" (Japanese: 闇(やみ)の深(しん)淵(えん))	September 22, 2018	October 27, 2018
392	22	"A Serious Fight"; Transliteration: "Honki no Faito" (Japanese: 本気(ほんき)のファイト)	September 29, 2018	November 03, 2018
393	23	"A Little Beacon"; Transliteration: "Chiisana hikari" (Japanese: 小(ちい)さな光(ひかり))	October 6, 2018	November 10, 2018
394	24	"Kai"; Transliteration: "Kai" (Japanese: 櫂(かい))	October 13, 2018	November 17, 2018
395	25	"Vanguard"; Transliteration: "Vangādo" (Japanese: 先導者(ヴァンガード))	October 20, 2018	November 24, 2018
396	26	"Vanguard Abnormality!? Unit Encyclopedia!!"; Transliteration: "Vanga ihen!! Yunitto dai zukan" (Japanese: ヴァンガ異変!! ユニット大図鑑)	October 27, 2018	December 1, 2018
397	27	"Stand Up! High School Life"; Transliteration: "Sutando Appu! Haisukūru Raifu!!" (Japanese: スタンドアップ！ハイスクール・ライフ)	November 3, 2018	December 8, 2018
398	28	"Cardfight Club Initiated!"; Transliteration: "Kādofaito-bu, Hajimemasu!" (Japanese: カードファイト部、始めます！)	November 10, 2018	December 15, 2018
399	29	"New Allies"; Transliteration: "Aratana Nakama" (Japanese: 新たな仲間)	November 17, 2018	December 22, 2018
400	30	"My Idol"; Transliteration: "Watashi no Aidoru" (Japanese: 私のアイドル)	November 24, 2018	January 04, 2019
401	31	"The Backstage Boss"; Transliteration: "Kage no Banchō" (Japanese: 影の番長)	December 1, 2018	January 11, 2019
402	32	"First Exchange Match"; Transliteration: "Hajimete no Kōryūsen" (Japanese: 初めての交流戦)	December 8, 2018	January 18, 2019
403	33	"Vanguard Koshien"; Transliteration: "Vangado Kōshien" (Japanese: ヴァンガード甲子園)	December 15, 2018	January 25, 2019
404	34	"Another Vanguard"; Transliteration: "Mō Hitori no Vangādo" (Japanese: もうひとりの先導者ヴァンガード)	December 22, 2018	February 01, 2019
405	35	"Concert Master, Takuto"; Transliteration: "Konsāto Masutā Takuto" (Japanese: コンサートマスター タクト)	January 5, 2019	February 08, 2019
406	36	"Destiny Conductor"; Transliteration: "Disutinī Kondakutā" (Japanese: ディスティニーコンダクター)	January 12, 2019	February 15, 2019
407	37	"Invasion of the PSYqualia Zombie"; Transliteration: "Saikuoria Zonbi Shūrai" (Japanese: PSYクオリアゾンビ襲来)	January 19, 2019	February 22, 2019
408	38	"Beyond Imagination!"; Transliteration: "Unmei o Koero!" (Japanese: 運命を超えろ!)	January 26, 2019	March 01, 2019
409	39	"True Strength"; Transliteration: "Hontō no Chikara" (Japanese: 本当の力)	February 2, 2019	March 08, 2019
410	40	"True and Fake"; Transliteration: "Honmono to Nisemono" (Japanese: 本物と偽者)	February 9, 2019	March 15, 2019
411	41	"Phantom Final Turn"; Transliteration: "Maboroshi no Fainaru Tān" (Japanese: 幻のファイナルターン)	February 16, 2019	March 22, 2019
412	42	"Called Walkers, Those Ruled by Fate"; Transliteration: "Kōrudouōkā Unmei Ni Sasō Tori Sa Reshi Mono" (Japanese: コールドウォーカー運命に支酉されし者)	February 23, 2019	March 29, 2019
413	43	"Distorted Bonds"; Transliteration: "Yugame Rareta Kizuna" (Japanese: 歪められた絆)	March 2, 2019	April 5, 2019
414	44	"Entangled Fate"; Transliteration: "Karami au Unmei" (Japanese: 絡みあう運命)	March 9, 2019	April 12, 2019
415	45	"Rivalry"; Transliteration: "Sōkoku" (Japanese: 相克)	March 16, 2019	April 19, 2019
416	46	"The Vilest Enemy: Aichi"; Transliteration: "Saikyō no Teki Aichi" (Japanese: 最凶の敵・アイチ)	March 23, 2019	April 26, 2019
417	47	"The Truth of Destiny Conductor"; Transliteration: "Unmei o Shiki Suru Mono (Disutinī Kondakutā), Sono Shōtai" (Japanese: 運命を指揮する者(ディスティニーコンダクター)、その正体)	March 30, 2019	May 3, 2019
418	48	"Kai's Memory"; Transliteration: "Kai no Kioku" (Japanese: 櫂の記憶)	April 6, 2019	May 10, 2019
419	49	"Bonds"; Transliteration: "Kizuna" (Japanese: 絆)	April 13, 2019	May 17, 2019
420	50	"The Day When Vanguard Disappears"; Transliteration: "Vangādo ga Kieru hi" (Japanese: ヴァンガードが消える日)	April 20, 2019	May 24, 2019
421	51	"Messiah"; Transliteration: "Mesaia" (Japanese: 救世主(メサイア))	April 27, 2019	May 31, 2019
422	52	"Vanguard Abnormality!! Unit Encyclopedia Grade 2!!"; Transliteration: "Vanga Ihen!! Yunitto Dai Zukan Gureido Tu!!" (Japanese: ヴァンガ異変!! ユニット大図鑑グレイド2!!)	May 4, 2019	June 7, 2019

=== Cardfight!! Vanguard: High School Arc Cont. (2019) ===
No. overall	No. in season	Title	Original release date	English air date
423	1	"Disband!!"; Transliteration: "Wai bu!!" (Japanese: 廃部!!)	May 11, 2019	June 14, 2019
424	2	"Aichi's the Coach!?"; Transliteration: "Kōchi wa Aichi!?" (Japanese: コーチはアイチ！？)	May 18, 2019	June 21, 2019
425	3	"Evil-eyed Prince from Another World Sings of the Strongest Hero and Love"; Transliteration: "Isekai tensei shita yokoshima me no ōji wa, saikyō yūsha to ai o utau" (Japanese: 異世界転生した邪眼の王子は、最強勇者と愛を謳う)	May 25, 2019	June 28, 2019
426	4	"Beyond Globalization!!"; Transliteration: "Gurōbaru o koero!!" (Japanese: グローバルを超えろ！！)	June 1, 2019	July 5, 2019
427	5	"Lost Imagination"; Transliteration: "Ushinawareta Imēji" (Japanese: 失われたイメージ)	June 8, 2019	July 12, 2019
428	6	"The Beginning of The End"; Transliteration: "Hajimari no Ji Endo" (Japanese: はじまりのジ・エンド)	June 15, 2019	July 19, 2019
429	7	"Greion's Whisper"; Transliteration: "Gureiwon no Sasayaki" (Japanese: グレイヲンの囁き)	June 22, 2019	July 26, 2019
430	8	"The Last Delete End"; Transliteration: "Za Rasuto Derīto Endo" (Japanese: Theザ・・・ラスト・デリートエンド)	June 29, 2019	August 2, 2019
431	9	"Ruler's Resolution"; Transliteration: "Ōja no Ketsui" (Japanese: 王者の決意)	July 6, 2019	August 9, 2019
432	10	"Stand Up! The Vanguard Koshien!!"; Transliteration: "Sutando Appu!! Vangādo Kōshien!!" (Japanese: スタンドアップ！！ヴァンガード甲子園！！)	July 13, 2019	August 16, 2019
433	11	"Welcome Back, Kai"; Transliteration: "Okaeri, Kai" (Japanese: おかえり、櫂)	July 20, 2019	August 23, 2019
434	12	"Memories Neither from the Past Nor Future"; Transliteration: "Kako Demo Mirai Demonai Kioku" (Japanese: 過去でも未来でもない記憶)	July 27, 2019	August 31, 2019
435	13	"Decisive Fight!!"; Transliteration: "Ketchaku!!" (Japanese: 決着!!)	August 3, 2019	September 7, 2019
436	14	"Welcome to the CF Club"; Transliteration: "Yōkoso, Kādofaito Buhe" (Japanese: ようこそ、カードファイト部へ)	August 10, 2019	September 14, 2019

=== Cardfight!! Vanguard (Shinemon Arc) (2019–2020) ===
No. overall	No. in season	Title	Original release date	English air date
437	1	"I'm the Manager!!"; Transliteration: "Ore ga Tenchōda!!" (Japanese: オレが店長だ！！)	August 24, 2019	September 28, 2019
438	2	"Welcome to Esuka!!"; Transliteration: "Esuka e Yōkoso!!" (Japanese: エスカへようこそ！！)	August 31, 2019	October 5, 2019
439	3	"First Time Holding the Fort"; Transliteration: "Hajimete no Orushuban" (Japanese: はじめてのお留守番)	September 7, 2019	October 12, 2019
440	4	"Idol's Birth?"; Transliteration: "Aidoru Tanjō?" (Japanese: アイドル誕生?)	September 14, 2019	October 19, 2019
441	5	"Token Fight!! Plant VS Evil Decoy!!"; Transliteration: "Tōkun Taiketsu!! Puranto bui esu Ibirudekoi!!" (Japanese: トークン対決!! プラントV(ブイ)S(エス)妖魔変幻(イビルデコイ)!!)	September 21, 2019	October 26, 2019
442	6	"Last Ditch No Guard!!"; Transliteration: "Dotanba no Nōgādo!!" (Japanese: 土壇場のノーガード!!)	September 28, 2019	November 2, 2019
443	7	"Capital Revived!!"; Transliteration: "Kyapitaru Fukkatsu!!" (Japanese: キャピタル復活!!)	October 5, 2019	November 9, 2019
444	8	"Welcome to Capital!!"; Transliteration: "Kyapitaru e Yōkoso!!" (Japanese: キャピタルへようこそ!!)	October 12, 2019	November 16, 2019
445	9	"Valkerion's Tears"; Transliteration: "Varukerion no Namida" (Japanese: ヴァルケリオンの涙)	October 19, 2019	November 23, 2019
446	10	"End of Shinemon"; Transliteration: "Ashita naki Shinemon" (Japanese: 明日なき新右衛門)	October 26, 2019	November 30, 2019
447	11	"New, New Shinemon?"; Transliteration: "Shin Shin Shinemon?" (Japanese: 新・新・新右衛門？)	November 2, 2019	December 7, 2019
448	12	"Team Dragon's Vanity!!"; Transliteration: "Chīmu Ryū ga Dokuson!!" (Japanese: チーム竜牙独尊！！)	November 9, 2019	December 16, 2019
449	13	"Esu Cup Match"; Transliteration: "Esu Kappu Kesshō" (Japanese: エスカップ決勝)	November 16, 2019	December 21, 2019
450	14	"Card or Life"; Transliteration: "Kādo ka Jinsei ka" (Japanese: カードか人生か)	November 23, 2019	December 28, 2019
451	15	"Image Transformed!!"; Transliteration: "Imēji o Nurikaero!!" (Japanese: イメージを塗り替えろ!!)	November 30, 2019	January 11, 2020
452	16	"Trial of Deities"; Transliteration: "Kamigami no Jikken" (Japanese: 神々の実験)	December 7, 2019	January 18, 2020
453	17	"True Passion"; Transliteration: "Hontōni Yaritai Koto" (Japanese: 本当にやりたいこと)	December 14, 2019	January 25, 2020
454	18	"Examinees' Merry Christmas"; Transliteration: "Jukensei no Merī Kurisumasu" (Japanese: 受験生のメリークリスマス)	December 21, 2019	February 1, 2020
455	19	"Vanguard Abnormality, Shinemon Fight Encyclopedia"; Transliteration: "Vangādo Ihen Shinemon Faito Daizukan" (Japanese: ヴァンガ異変 新右衛門ファイト大図鑑)	December 28, 2019	February 8, 2020
456	20	"Gear Chronicle"; Transliteration: "Gia Kuronikuru" (Japanese: ギアクロニクル)	January 11, 2020	February 15, 2020
457	21	"Summoning Experiment"; Transliteration: "Shōkan Jikken" (Japanese: 召喚実験)	January 18, 2020	February 22, 2020
458	22	"The Day Before"; Transliteration: "Sono Zenjitsu" (Japanese: その前日)	January 25, 2020	February 29, 2020
459	23	"Clash between Master and Student"; Transliteration: "Shitei Gekitotsu" (Japanese: 師弟激突)	February 1, 2020	March 7, 2020
460	24	"The Real Opponent"; Transliteration: "Hontō no Aite" (Japanese: 本当の相手)	February 8, 2020	March 14, 2020
461	25	"The Night at Yumigatake"; Transliteration: "Yumigatake no Yoru" (Japanese: 弓ヶ岳の夜)	February 15, 2020	March 19, 2020
462	26	"Arch-aider Malkuth-melekh"; Transliteration: "Tokusō-tenki Marukuto-mereku" (Japanese: 特装天機マルクトメレク)	February 22, 2020	March 28, 2020
463	27	"Manifest the Units!!"; Transliteration: "Yunitto Genshutsu!!" (Japanese: ユニット現出!!)	February 29, 2020	April 4, 2020
464	28	"Our Wings"; Transliteration: "Ore-tachi no Tsubasa" (Japanese: オレたちの翼)	March 7, 2020	April 11, 2020
465	29	"Once Again, To Capital"; Transliteration: "Futatabi Kyapitaru He" (Japanese: ふたたびキャピタルへ)	March 14, 2020	April 18, 2020
466	30	"A New Vanguard"; Transliteration: "Aratanaru Sendō-sha" (Japanese: 新たなる先導者)	March 21, 2020	April 25, 2020
467	31	"Three Idols? / Shin Nitta"; Transliteration: "3-Ri no Aidoru? / Nitta Shin" (Japanese: 3人のアイドル？/新田シン)	March 28, 2020	May 2, 2020

== Mini Vanguard series ==
Also known as Mini Van (みにヴぁん), it is a short comedy flash anime series that is produced by DLE. It is based on the spin-off yonkoma manga series of the same name by Quily. Some of the episodes do not have titles.

Ending theme

- "Mirai Sketch" by Ultra Rare (Mimori, Nanjō, and Terakawa)

No.	Title	Original release date
1	"The Many Faces of Cardfight" (Japanese: カードファイト百面相)	April 6, 2013
Aichi misplaces his Blaster Blade card with a Kourin card that he received from Morikawa. Then, Aichi tries to learn about poker faces by watching Misaki and Kai. Finally, in the Mini Van Broadcast segment, Misaki comments on how Morikawa and Kamui are similar to each other.
2	TBA	April 13, 2013
Aichi and his friends relate the stories of Cinderella and Little Red Riding Hood with Vanguard. Shin's allergies act up, revealing his peculiar sneeze. Kai is suspected of also having a funny-sounding sneeze.
3	"Yes, My Vanguard" (Japanese: イエス・マイ・ヴァンガード)	April 20, 2013
While buying a booster pack, Aichi uses Psyqualia to see if the pack contains a grade 3 card, which upsets Shin. Then, Aichi has a strange dream about an unknown Vanguard unit called Capelin; he later tries to find out what it is but is shocked by his discovery. Finally, it is a quiet day in Card Capital when Misaki, Tetsu, and Kai are the only ones there.
4	TBA	April 27, 2013
Ren gives Misaki the nickname "Misa-Q". Aichi tries to fall asleep by counting sheep but keeps thinking about Great Nature units. Kyou makes fun of Ren's nickname for Asaka which greatly angers her.
5	TBA	May 4, 2013
Shin receives advice from CEO Amaterasu on how to increase revenue for Card Capital. Aichi tries to wake up Kai in the Mini Van Broadcast segment.
6	TBA	May 11, 2013
Emi unintentionally saddens Aichi when she says she wanted an older sister like Misaki instead of a brother. Teams Q4 and AL4 come across each other on a rainy day, with Kyou being left out in the rain by AL4. Aichi sees Kai on the street and thinks he is image-training when Kai is wondering about the Assista-cat.
7	TBA	May 18, 2013
The Assista-cat is now the hardworking manager of Card Capital which has become a bakery. However, this all turns out to be one of the Assista-cat's dreams.
8	(Japanese: いっしょに行こうよ)	May 25, 2013
Team Q4 travels via train to a Vanguard event. On the way there, they play shiritori but Kai keeps ending the game. Kyou helps Team AL4 hitch a ride to a tournament but gets left behind.
9	(Japanese: 日課だもんで)	June 1, 2013
In a rakugo performance, Aichi tells a story about a card that would be given the name of every other card in existence. Aichi and his friends go to Card Capital, but upon arrival, they each are surprised to see the shop is closed.
10	(Japanese: ヤツの正体)	June 8, 2013
Aichi and his friends wonder about Kai always wearing heavy clothing and also imagine him as a robot.
11	(Japanese: みにヴぁん 放送局)	June 15, 2013
Aichi attempts to interview the whimsical Ren. After visiting a clothing store, Misaki tries to give more cheerful greetings to customers at Card Capital.
12	TBA	June 22, 2013
Ren has Tetsu talk more like a villain. Aichi and his friends go to a bathhouse where many antics ensue.
13	TBA	June 29, 2013
Misaki and Asaka accidentally bump into each other on the street and find a common interest. The quiet trio (Kai, Misaki, and Tetsu) hangs out by the riverside. After AL4 watches a violent movie, Asaka takes jabs at Kyou by relating the events of the movie with him.
14	"Very Upset" (Japanese: 超不機嫌)	July 6, 2013
Kai takes his anger out on Aichi after supposedly having a dream of losing to Morikawa. In a futuristic era, Aichi and his friends are the crew members of the spaceship Card Capital and are about to combat evil alien forces (portrayed by Team AL4).
15	(Japanese: 名探偵 アイチ)	July 13, 2013
Aichi tries to show off his skills as a "master detective". For Tanabata, Miwa wishes to find a girlfriend but then causes a great misunderstanding. When strange things happen to Aichi, he eventually realizes that he is in a dream.
16	TBA	July 20, 2013
In the style of rakugo, Kamui tells a story about Kai supposedly having a fear of kittens which Morikawa tries to exploit.
17	TBA	July 27, 2013
Within another dream, Aichi plays a game of memory with Ren but under special rules.
18	(Japanese: 暑い日)	August 3, 2013
Aichi and Kamui try to cool themselves off by thinking about cards with cold imagery.
19	TBA	August 10, 2013
Teams Q4 and AL4 are both musical bands. Miwa explains to Aichi his reasoning for why he does not play in Vanguard tournaments.
20	(Japanese: みにヴぁン宇宙戦争)	August 17, 2013
Kamui tricks Misaki into helping him with his homework. In Mini Van Space Wars, the crew of the spaceship Card Capital is under attack by the alien forces of AL4.
21	(Japanese: みにヴぁん 放送局)	August 24, 2013
Kyou is the guest of the Mini Van Broadcast segment this time. Kamui fantasizes what it would be like if he and Emi were siblings.
22	TBA	August 31, 2013
The cast parodies the story of Momotarō. Morikawa is chastised by Misaki for having impure thoughts when he says he wants to go to the swimming pool.
23	(Japanese: みにヴぁン宇宙戦争)	September 7, 2013
Tetsu and Misaki watch a sunset together. Continuing in Mini Van Space Wars, Aichi infiltrates AL4's main spaceship to deactivate its shield, unaware of the trap set by AL4 as he returns to Card Capital. Ren and Kyou also watch a sunset, but Ren is unaware of Kyou's presence.
24	TBA	September 14, 2013
Kamui is suspected of holding back while fighting. Despite Tetsu's angry expression, Asaka thinks that he is happy because of the headband he is wearing. Morikawa is the only one in high spirits despite everyone else feeling terrible.
25	TBA	September 21, 2013
Aichi and Kamui try to play Vanguard using only their imaginations. Misaki shows that she refers her friends by nicknames on her cellphone's contact list.
26	TBA	September 28, 2013
In a Wild West setting, Kai and Kyou are about to have a showdown when Kyou gets flustered by Kai's dueling methods.
27	TBA	October 5, 2013
Miwa wishes to be in the Assita-cat's position as it sleeps on Misaki's lap. Aichi explains that having Psyqualia has its downsides. Miwa, Kyou, and Morikawa go to a cafe hosted by Battle Sisters, in which Miwa gets the short end of the stick. Nonetheless, this turns out to be another of the Assita-cat's dreams.
28	(Japanese: みにヴぁン宇宙戦争)	October 12, 2013
Kamui ponders about taxes. Continuing in Mini Van Space Wars, the crewmembers of the spaceship Card Capital try to attack the alien forces of Team AL4 but get struck by their trap.
29	TBA	October 19, 2013
On the planet Cray, CEO Amaterasu and Knight of Conviction, Bors are flirting with each other until they are both called into battle by Misaki and Aichi.
30	TBA	October 26, 2013
Kyou thinks he is getting better at reading Tetsu's moods but gets thrown off by one of his colorful headbands. Misaki uses Vanguard cards as a Tarot reading to tell Shin's fortune. Kamui and Emi dress up for Halloween, but when Kamui is given candy, it seems more like Shichi-Go-San.
31	(Japanese: みにヴぁん宇宙戦争)	November 2, 2013
Misaki makes a wish upon a shooting star for Shin to find a wife. It is a peaceful day at Card Capital when Aichi, Misaki, Miwa, and Izaki are the only people present. Continuing in Mini Van Space Wars, the crew of Card Capital is forced to land on the planet Cray. After a year passes in which many unexplained events occurred, the crew returns to outer space to battle AL4 once again.
32	"Teehee" (Japanese: てへ)	November 9, 2013
Shin tries to get Misaki to make a girly giggle. In a feudal Japan setting, samurai warrior Kamui challenges warlord Kai to a cardfight. Asaka makes a wish upon a shooting star which lands on top of Kyou.
33	(Japanese: みにヴぁん 放送局)	November 16, 2013
Misaki has a mountain of books which she refuses to clean up. In the Mini Van broadcast segment, Asaka talks forever about herself and Ren.
34	TBA	November 23, 2013
Misaki tells a story about herself as a warrior taking on 5 bosses on each floor of a five-storied pagoda.
35	(Japanese: みにヴぁん宇宙戦争)	November 30, 2013
In the conclusion of Mini Van Space Wars, Captain Kai orders the entire crew to evacuate the ship while he stays on to fight to the bitter end. It is then revealed that Space Wars is a story written by Kai.
36	TBA	December 7, 2013
When Team AL4 celebrates Ren's birthday, Asaka gets distraught when it seems as if Ren likes Kyou's present the most, but she is elated when Ren is using her present (a scarf).
37	TBA	December 14, 2013
Everyone celebrates Christmas

=== Mini Vanguard OVA ===
An original video animation episode was released with the first DVD release of Mini Vanguard.

No.	Title	Original release date
1	TBA	TBA
Wondering what it would be like to be Kai, Emi switches bodies with him and causes many misunderstandings as a result.
