= Love, Chunibyo & Other Delusions! Take on Me =

2018 Japanese animated film by Tatsuya Ishihara

- Promotional art for the film
- Kanji: 映画 中二病でも恋がしたい！ -Take On Me-
- Revised Hepburn: Eiga Chūnibyō demo Koi ga Shitai! Teiku on mī
- Directed by: Tatsuya Ishihara
- Screenplay by: Jukki Hanada
- Based on: Love, Chunibyo & Other Delusions by Torako
- Produced by: Gō Tanaka; Nagaharu Ōhashi; Shigeru Saitō; Shinichi Nakamura
- Cinematography: Akihiro Ura
- Edited by: Hiroyuki Takahashi
- Music by: Nijine
- Production company: Kyoto Animation
- Distributed by: Shochiku
- Release date: January 6, 2018 (Japan)
- Running time: 90 minutes
- Country: Japan
- Language: Japanese
- Box office: ¥193 million

Love, Chunibyo & Other Delusions! Take on Me (Japanese: 映画 中二病でも恋がしたい！ -Take On Me-, Hepburn: Eiga Chūnibyō demo Koi ga Shitai! Teiku on mī) is a 2018 Japanese animated film directed by Tatsuya Ishihara. It serves as the finale to the anime television series Love, Chunibyo & Other Delusions, based on Torako's light novel series of the same name. The film premiered in Japan on January 6, 2018.

== Plot ==
After the events of the second season of the series, Yūta Togashi, Rikka Takanashi, and Shinka Nibutani, are entering the third year of high school. Their junior, Sanae Dekomori, becomes the president of the student council. Rikka's sister, Tōka, tells Yūta on a call from Italy that she wanted to bring Rikka there as her career stabilizes. Yūta and Rikka initially assume that it was meant only to last the whole spring break. However, they soon find out that Tōka intends to permanently bring Rikka to Italy. That night, Shinka and Sanae, along with their friend Satone Shichimiya and senior Kumin Tsuyuri, suggest that the two elope. The two agree, and they board the train the next day.

Tōka soon discovers the plan and confronts the remaining members. After revealing that she had secretly recorded their conversation last night, she blackmails the group. Afraid of losing reputation at school, Sanae and Shinka comply.

Shinka and Sanae find Rikka and Yūta at the Kyoto Tower, but the two manage to flee and board a train to Kobe. Tōka later confronts Yūta at a diner. After asking questions about Rikka's chūnibyō, Tōka lets the two leave, warning that she would detain them if they happen to cross paths again.

Rikka and Yūta arrive at Wakayama, where they attempt to book a room at a love hotel. However, this fails, and as they leave, they see Sanae and Shinka. Yūta deduces that Tōka is tracking them using Rikka's phone. They take an overnight bus to Tokyo. Unbeknownst to Rikka, Yūta buys a butterfly-shaped ring. Running low on cash, they decide to go to Hokkaido to visit Rikka's mother. However, the two do not know the contact details. They attempt to retrieve it at a basement garage and Tōka cannot use Rikka's phone signal to track them. However, the phone manages to transmit a faint signal, enough to reveal their location to Tōka.

The next day, Rikka and Yūta go to Haneda Airport, where they see Shinka and Sanae. After making a distraction for the two, they successfully board a flight to Hokkaido.

After arriving there, Yūta reveals his intention why he wanted to talk to Rikka's mother about her future. The couple soon found out that Rikka's mother is absent, and is instead at Aomori. Meanwhile, Rikka calls Satone back home about her "losing powers". The next day, Yūta discovers that Rikka abandoned him in his sleep. However, he soon learned from Rikka's mother that Rikka had already meet up with her that morning.

Meanwhile, Rikka stands at Cape Tappi, struggling over her conflicting feelings. Satone and Kumin arrive at the scene, convincing Rikka to return to Yūta. Rikka confesses her thoughts to them, concerned that if she changes, she might lose Yūta. Sanae and Shinka also arrive at the scene, telling the group that they had informed Yūta about Rikka's whereabouts. As a sign of truce, Shinka gives them tickets for a ferry home. The couple reunite with a huge embrace.

On their ferry home, Rikka asks Yūta about her "abandoning her powers" and if Yūta still love her even after that. Yūta reaffirms his love for her, leading to their first kiss.

Yūta, Rikka, and her friends, attend what is revealed to be Tōka's wedding to an Italian man, and that the whole pursuit was a ruse to test Yūta's determination.

In the post-credits scene, Rikka's new apartment is now two floors above Yūta's. As Rikka climbs down on a rope to meet him, Yūta realizes that everything about her is the reason why he fell in love with her in the first place.

== Voice cast ==
Character	Japanese	English
Yuta Togashi	Jun Fukuyama	Leraldo Anzaldua
Rikka Takanashi	Maaya Uchida	Margaret McDonald
Shinka Nibutani	Chinatsu Akasaki	Maggie Flecknoe
Kumin Tsuyuri	Azumi Asakura	Emily Neves
Sanae Dekomori	Sumire Uesaka	Brittney Karbowski
Satone Shichimiya	Juri Nagatsuma	Christina Kelly
Makoto Isshiki	Sōichirō Hoshi	Greg Ayres
Toka Takanashi	Eri Sendai	Genevieve Simmons
Kuzuha Togashi	Kaori Fukuhara	Monica Rial
Nanase Tsukumo	Kikuko Inoue	Carli Mosier
Rikka's Mother	Junko Iwao	Carli Mosier

== Production ==
Kyoto Animation announced the film on May 19, 2017. Most of the staff returned for the series, with Ishihara directing the film. Jukki Hanada served as a screenwriter based on the original work by Torako. Character designer Kazumi Ikeda also returned, and music composer Nijine made the film's soundtrack. Singer Zaq performed the film's theme song, "Journey". Mutsuo Shinohara served as art director, Akihiro Ura served as cinematographer, and Yota Tsuruoka served as the sound director. Rin Yamamoto was in charge of the film's 3DCG, and Akiyo Takeda served as color key artist. Hiroyuki Takahashi edited the film. Shochiku distributed it in Japan.

== Release ==
The film premiered in Japan on January 6, 2018. It was released on Blu-ray and DVD on July 18, 2018. On April 16, 2018, Sentai Filmworks acquired the license for the film. It premiered at the Los Angeles Anime Film Festival on September 21, 2018. The DVD and Blu-ray versions were released on November 20, 2018. The film premiered at Madman Anime Festival on June 2, 2018.

== Reception ==
The film opened at number 6 in the Japanese box office on its opening weekend, grossing ¥70,422,300. It dropped to number 9 on its second weekend, taking in ¥41,551,500, before falling out of the top ten on its third weekend with ¥22,590,400. Overall, it grossed ¥193,264,100 and US$1.74 million.

Kim Morrissy of Anime News Network praised the film for finally progressing Rikka and Yuta's relationship, but otherwise felt that it somewhat retread ground covered by the first two television series. He also found the film's animation to be good but lacking, more in line with the television series than a typical theatrical production, and made special note of the poor inclusion of 3D objects, such as vehicles, into the 2D animation. He appreciated the film's many references to other Kyoto Animation series, such as Tamako Market, Sound! Euphonium, Haruhi Suzumiya, and Clannad, and opined that the film would mainly appeal to fans of the series who had enjoyed the second season of the anime, as well as fans of Kyoto Animation's other works.
