= Love, Chunibyo & Other Delusions (TV series) =

Japanese anime television series

- The series logo
- 中二病でも恋がしたい! Chūnibyō demo Koi ga Shitai!
- Genre: Romantic comedy
- Based on: Love, Chunibyo & Other Delusions by Torako
- Directed by: Tatsuya Ishihara
- Screenplay by: Jukki Hanada
- Character designers: Nozomi Ōsaka; Kazumi Ikeda (Note: As a character designer and a chief animation director)
- Music by: Nijine
- Voices of: Jun Fukuyama; Maaya Uchida; Sumire Uesaka; Chinatsu Akasaki; Azumi Asakura
- Opening theme: "Sparkling Daydream" by Zaq (S1); "Voice" by Zaq (S2)
- Ending themes: "Inside Identity" by Black Raison D'Étre (S1); "Vanishment This World" by Black Raison D'Étre (S2)
- Country of origin: Japan
- Original language: Japanese
- No. of seasons: 2
- No. of episodes: 24 + 2 OVAs (list of episodes)

Production
- Art director: Mutsuo Shinohara
- Sound director: Yota Tsuruoka
- Cinematographer: Rin Yamato
- Color designer: Akiyo Takeda
- Editor: Kengo Shigemura
- Studio: Kyoto Animation
- Producers: Eharu Ōhashi; Shigeru Saitō; Shinichi Nakamura; Hideaki Hatta (Note: As an Executive Producer)
- Production companies: Chūnibyō Demo Production Committee: Kyoto Animation; Lantis; Pony Canyon; TBS
- Runtime: 24 minutes

Original release
- Networks: Tokyo MX, Sun TV, KBS, TV Aichi, Animax, BS11
- Release: October 4, 2012 – March 26, 2014

Related
- Love, Chunibyo & Other Delusions! Take on Me

Love, Chunibyo & Other Delusions!, (Note: Japanese: 中二病でも恋がしたい!, romanized: Chūnibyō demo Koi ga Shitai!, lit. '"Even with Eighth Grader Syndrome, I Want to Be in Love"') also known as Chū-2 for short, is a Japanese anime television series based on Torako's light novel series of the same name and produced by Kyoto Animation.

The first season aired in Japan from October 4 to December 19, 2012, and the second one from January 8 to March 26, 2014. The series was simulcast by Crunchyroll. The first episode for a second set of Lite episodes was released on December 26, 2013, and the second series of shorts, Heated Table Series: Kotatsu, accompanied on Blu-ray and DVD, were released on March 19, 2014. Sentai Filmworks licensed the series and streamed on Hidive. The series was licensed by Madman Anime.

== Plot ==
Yūta Togashi lives in shame of his behaviour in middle-school, characterised by symptoms of "chūnibyō" — delusions of grandeur, displayed though a holier-than-thou persona, "Dark Flame Master" — and intends to start high-school as an ordinary student. However, he unexpectedly encounters fellow first-year student, Rikka Takanashi, who still exhibits chūnibyō as the self-appointed "Wicked Eye", having met her the night before on his balcony. Despite Yūta's annoyances with Rikka's personality, the two spend time together by virtue of living a floor apart in the same apartment complex. They form and develop connections through Rikka's formation of the "Far-East Magical Napping Society – Summer Thereof", its members including Rikka's friend and "Wielder of the Mjollnir Hammer", Sanae Dekomori, the napping enthusiast, Kumin Tsuyuri, and fellow first-year student, Shinka Nibutani; the latter, similar to Yūta, is embarrassed by her own chūnibyō persona in middle-school, the mage "Mori Summer".

Yūta gradually comes to accept Rikka's delusional lifestyle and intent to seek her father's location through the lead of the "Ethereal Horizon", which are challenged throughout their lives, mainly by her relationship with her family. Rikka's elder sister, Tōka, wishes for her to shed her chūnibyō and accept the death of her father. Both Yūta and Rikka come to develop romantic feelings for each other, and it is revealed that Rikka was inspired to live with chūnibyō by observing Yūta in his Dark Flame Master phase.

After getting permission from her grandparents, Rikka continues residing in Yūta's apartment. When Yuta's family travel to Indonesia, the latter and Rikka slowly progress their relationship, but each face their own struggles. Yūta is pressured to advance the relationship more than he already has. Rikka is conflicted about "losing the Wicked Eye's powers" — ridding herself of her chūnibyō — to accommodate her love for Yūta, and if it will be truly accepted. The cast is joined by Satone Shichimiya ("Sophia Ring SP Saturn VII"), a middle-school friend of Yūta, with whom she faces an unrequited love.

The series ends with the anime film Love, Chunibyo & Other Delusions! Take on Me, with Rikka and Yūta eloping in a trip around Japan, and evading Tōka when she plans to invite Rikka to Italy.

== Series overview ==
Season	Episodes	Originally released	
Season	Episodes	First released	Last released
1	12	4 October 2012	20 December 2012
2	12	8 January 2014	26 March 2014

== Voice cast ==
Character	Japanese	English
Yūta Togashi	Jun Fukuyama	Leraldo Anzaldua
Rikka Takanashi	Maaya Uchida	Margaret McDonald
Sanae Dekomori	Sumire Uesaka	Brittney Karbowski
Shinka Nibutani	Chinatsu Akasaki	Maggie Flecknoe
Kumin Tsuyuri	Azumi Asakura	Emily Neves (Note: Also serves as the ADR Director for the English dub.)
Makoto Isshiki	Sōichirō Hoshi	Greg Ayres
Satone Shichimiya	Juri Nagatsuma	Christina Kelly
Tōka Takanashi	Eri Sendai	Genevieve Simmons
Kuzuha Togashi	Kaori Fukuhara	Monica Rial
Kazari Kannagi	Manami Shirakawa	Molly Searcy

== Release ==
=== Love, Chunibyo & Other Delusions ===
In December 2011, Kyoto Animation announced that the series has received its anime adaptation and would run on television in the issue of the Newtype magazine in August 2012. The series aired in Japan from October 4 to December 19, 2012. The series of six original net animation shorts titled Love, Chunibyo & Other Delusions Lite were streamed weekly on YouTube between September 27 and November 1, 2012. The series was released on six Blu-ray and DVD compilation volumes by Pony Canyon between December 19, 2012, and May 15, 2013. The volumes contained bonus shorts titled Depth of Field: Ai to Nikushimi Gekijō (Depth of Field ～ 愛と憎しみ劇場; Depth of Field: Love and Hate Theater). A seventh volume with the original video animation episode and the Lite shorts, was released on June 19, 2013.

=== Love, Chunibyo & Other Delusions: Heart Throb ===
A second series, Love, Chunibyo & Other Delusions: Heart Throb, aired in Japan from January 8 to March 26, 2014. The first episode of a second set of Lite episodes was released on December 26, 2013, and a second series of shorts called Heated Table Series: Kotatsu accompanied each BD/DVD release, starting on March 19, 2014.

=== Films ===
The series has two films. An anime film titled Love, Chunibyo and Other Delusions!: Rikka Version (小鳥遊六花・改 ～劇場版 中二病でも恋がしたい!～, Takanashi Rikka Kai: Gekijō-ban Chūnibyō Demo Koi ga Shitai!; lit. 'Love, Chunibyo & Other Delusions the Movie: Rikka Takanashi Revision'), served as the retelling story for the first season, was released on September 14, 2013, and was later released on Blu-ray Disc and DVD on February 19, 2014. A second anime film, Love, Chunibyo & Other Delusions! Take on Me (映画 中二病でも恋がしたい! -Take on Me-, Eiga Chūnibyō demo Koi ga Shitai! Take on Me), was released on January 6, 2018. It is set after the second season and served as the finale of the anime series. The staff and cast from the original anime series returned to reprise their roles for the film.

=== Music ===
The opening theme for the first season is "Sparkling Daydream" by Zaq, and the ending theme is "Inside Identity" by Black Raison d'être. There are also three insert songs: "Hajimari no Tane" (始まりの種; The Seed of Start) by Zaq in episode eight, "Kimi no Tonari ni" (君のとなりに; Next to You) by Zaq in episode ten and "Miagete Goran Yoru no Hoshi o" (見上げてごらん夜の星を; Look Up at the Stars in the Night) by Maaya Uchida in episode ten. The single for "Sparkling Daydream" was released on October 24, 2012, and the single for "Inside Identity" on November 21, 2012. For the Lite episodes, the opening theme is "Kimi e" (君へ; To You) and the ending theme is "Shikkoku ni Odoru Haōbushi" (漆黒に躍る弧濁覇王節; The Melody of Conqueror Dancing in Jet Black); both are sung by Zaq.

The second season features two pieces of music: the opening theme is "Voice" by Zaq and the ending theme is "Van!shment Th!s World" by Black Raison d'être. The ending theme for the Lite episodes is "Shin'en ni Mau Senritsu Shanikusai" (深淵に舞う戦慄謝肉祭, A Hair-Raising Carnival Dancing in the Abyss) by Zaq.

=== International release and distribution ===
The English language logo of the series used outside of Japan issued by Sentai Filmworks for its home video releases in North America.

Crunchyroll has streamed the series in selected regions. In North America, Sentai Filmworks has acquired the series for home video and was streamed on the Anime Network before transferring to its nascent Hidive service with an English dub production starring the voices of Margaret McDonald, Leraldo Anzaldua, Brittney Karbowski, Maggie Flecknoe, Emily Neves, and Christina Kelly. Sentai Filmworks released the second season on August 25, 2015. The films are also licensed by Sentai Filmworks and distributed by Section23 Films in North America.

In Southeast Asia, it was aired by Animax Asia and premiered on June 2, 2014.

The second season was licensed by Animatsu Entertainment in the United Kingdom. Madman Anime started streaming the series on January 7, 2014, on Madman's Screening Room in Australia and New Zealand.

Following the acquisition of Crunchyroll by Sony Pictures Television, the parent company of Funimation in 2021, the series was removed from the service on March 31, 2022.
