= Genevieve Simmons =

American voice actress

- Born: Geneieve Ariele Simmons; June 24, 1991 (age 35); Houston, Texas, U.S.
- Education: University of Houston
- Occupations: Voice actress, entrepenteur, writer
- Years active: 2012–present
- Relatives: Juliet Simmons (sister)

Genevieve Ariele Simmons (born June 24, 1991) is an American voice actress and business entrepreneur. She is known to voice several characters produced by Sentai Studios and Media Blasters, such as Mikoto Urabe in Mysterious Girlfriend X, Shiho Nishizumi in Girls und Panzer, Subaru Konoe in Mayo Chiki!, Toka Takanashi in Love, Chunibyo & Other Delusions and Momo Chiyoda in The Demon Girl Next Door.

== Biography ==
Simmons was born on June 24, 1991, in Houston. She graduated from the University of Houston's C. T. Bauer College of Business. One of her first roles in anime is Masazumi Honda in Horizon in the Middle of Nowhere.

Her sister, Juliet, is also a voice actress.

== Filmography ==
=== Anime and OVAs ===
List of dubbing performances in anime
| Year | Title | Role | Notes | Refs |
|---|---|---|---|---|
| 2012 | Horizon in the Middle of Nowhere | Masazumi Honda | Debut role | |
| 2012 | Maji de Watashi ni Koi Shinasai! | Takae Tachibana | | |
| 2012 | Mysterious Girlfriend X | Mikoto Urabe | | |
| 2012 | Shining Hearts: Shiawase no Pan | Neris | | |
| 2013 | AKB0048 | Kanata Shinonome | | |
| 2013 | Battle Girls: Time Paradox | Date Masamune | | |
| 2013 | Bodacious Space Pirates | Quartz Christie; Catherine | | |
| 2013 | Campione! | Liliana Kranjcar | | |
| 2013 | Dusk Maiden of Amnesia | Yuuko Kirishima | | |
| 2013 | Girls und Panzer | Shiho Nishizumi; Noriko Isube | | |
| 2013 | Kamisama Dolls | Mahiru Hyuga | | |
| 2013 | Say I Love You | Chiharu Ogawa | | |
| 2014 | AKB0048: Next Stage | Kanata Shinonome | | |
| 2014 | Girls und Panzer OVA | Shiho Nishizumi; Noriko Isube | | |
| 2014 | Mayo Chiki! | Subaru Konoe | | |
| 2014 | MM! | Michiru Onigawara | | |
| 2014 | Tamako Market | Tatsuya | | |
| 2014 | Upotte!! | Funco; Gossan | | |
| 2015 | Akame ga Kill! | Prostitute | | |
| 2015 | Ladies versus Butlers! | Hedyeh | | |
| 2015 | Love, Chunibyo & Other Delusions | Tōka Takanashi | Season 1 | |
| 2017 | Is It Wrong to Try to Pick Up Girls in a Dungeon? | Ryu Lion | | |
| 2017 | Love, Chunibyo & Other Delusions: Heart Throb | Toka Takanashi | | |
| 2018 | Kakegurui | Yuriko Nishinotouin | Sentai dub | |
| 2020 | Shirobako | Yuka Okitsu | | |
| 2020 | The Demon Girl Next Door | Momo Chiyoda | | |
| 2021 | Kandagawa Jet Girls | Misa Aoi | Credited as "Darcy Whitehall" | |
| 2021 | To Love Ru Darkness 2nd | Nemesis | | |
| 2022 | The Demon Girl Next Door 2 | Momo Chiyoda | | |
| 2023 | The Eminence in Shadow | Eta | | |
| 2023 | My Isekai Life | Sonia | Episodes 6 and 7 | |
| 2023 | Oshi no Ko | Nurse | | |
| 2023 | The Dangers in My Heart | Kana Ichikawa | | |
| 2024 | Dungeon People | Water Spirit | | |
| 2025 | Loner Life in Another World | Vice Rep A | | |
| 2025 | Rock Is a Lady's Modesty | Yuka | | |
| 2025 | Isekai Quartet | Eta | Third Season | |

=== Films ===
List of dubbing performances in film
| Year | Title | Role | Notes | Refs |
|---|---|---|---|---|
| 2013 | Colorful | Mao | | |
| 2017 | Love, Chunibyo & Other Delusions! - Rikka Version | Toka Takanashi | | |
| 2018 | Love, Chunibyo & Other Delusions! Take on Me | Toka Takanashi | | |
| 2019 | Is It Wrong to Try to Pick Up Girls in a Dungeon?: Arrow of the Orion | Ryu Lion | | |

=== Video games ===
List of dubbing performances in video games
| Year | Title | Role | Notes | Refs |
|---|---|---|---|---|
| 2021 | World's End Club | Jennu | | |
| 2023 | Labyrinth of Galleria: The Moon Society | Kay | | |
