= Nagatsuma =

Nagatsuma (written: 長妻) is a Japanese surname. Notable people with the surname include:

- Akira Nagatsuma (長妻 昭, born 1960), Japanese politician
- Juri Nagatsuma (長妻 樹里, born 1988), Japanese voice actress
- Tadao Nagatsuma, American engineer
