= Margaret McDonald (voice actress) =

American voice actress

- Born: Margaret Allison MacDonald; June 12, 1988 (age 37); Houston, Texas, U.S.
- Occupation: Voice actress
- Years active: 2012–present

Margaret Allison McDonald (born June 12, 1988) is an American voice actress. Some of her major roles in anime are Rikka Takanashi from the Love, Chunibyo & Other Delusions series, Miho Nishizumi in Girls und Panzer, Saika Totsuka in the My Teen Romantic Comedy SNAFU series, Mei Sagara in Nakaimo - My Sister Is Among Them!, Haruka Saigusa in Little Busters!, Harumi Taniguchi in Citrus, Tamako Kitashirakawa in Tamako Market and Yachiho Azuma in Chained Soldier.

== Anime ==
Year	Title	Role	Notes	Source
2012	Majikoi: Oh! Samurai Girls	Mayo Amakasu		
2012	Horizon in the Middle of Nowhere	Suzu Mukai		
2012	Bodacious Space Pirates	Ai Hoshimiya		
2012	Shining Hearts: Shiawase no Pan	Ranah		
2012	AKB0048	Yuki Kashiwagi the 6th, Aoi, Ear Muffs Girl		
2012	Campione!	Mother, Hikari Mariya		
2012	Say "I Love You"	Izumi		
2013	Horizon in the Middle of Nowhere II	Suzu Mukai		
2013	Kokoro Connect	Kaito		
2013	Hakuoki: Dawn of the Shinsengumi	Kosuzu		
2013	Girls und Panzer	Miho Nishizumi		
2013	Aura: Koga Maryuin's Last War	Enomoto, Oda		
2013	Little Busters!	Haruka Saigusa		
2013	Btooom!	Miho Nishizumi		
2013	Another	Aya Ayano		
2013	Nakaimo: My Little Sister Is Among Them	Mei Sagara		
2013	Nyan Koi!	Suzu Kosaka		
2014	Mardock Scramble: The Third Exhaust	Shell's Girlfriend		
2014	Medaka Box Abnormal	Mizou Yukuhashi		
2014	AKB0048: Next Stage	Yuki Kashiwagi the 6th, Aoi Koenji, Yuka's Sister		
2014	Girls und Panzer OVA	Miho Nishizumi		
2014	Maria Holic	Sachi Momoi		
2014	Upotte!!	Nanayon (AK74)		
2014	Maria Holic Alive	Sachi Momoi		
2014	Hakkenden: Eight Dogs of the East	Suzu Kumagai, Kaho Akihiko, Nakamura		
2014	Samurai Bride	Inshun Hozoin		
2014	Problem Children Are Coming from Another World, Aren't They?	Riri		
2014	Mayo Chiki!	Masamune Usami		
2014	WataMote: No Matter How I Look at It, It's You Guys' Fault I'm Not Popular!	Hina Nemoto		
2014	Tamako Market	Tamako Kitashirakawa		
2014	Rozen Maiden: Zurückspulen	Saito		
2014	Sunday Without God	Sophia, Mimita Gedenburg, Memepo Gedenburg		
2014	Log Horizon	Isuzu, Runaway Noob		
2014	The Ambition of Oda Nobuna	Matsudaira Motoyasu, Botenmaru		
2015	Muv-Luv Alternative: Total Eclipse	Izumi Noto, Fikatsia's Son		
2015	Little Busters! Refrain	Haruka Saigusa		
2015	Maid Sama!	Sakura Hanazono, Mochi		
2015	Leviathan: The Last Defense	Metal, Cockatrice		
2015	Love, Chunibyo & Other Delusions	Rikka Takanashi	First season	
2015	Nobunaga the Fool	Nell		
2015	The World God Only Knows: Magical Star Kanon 100%	Kozue		
2015	Soni-Ani: Super Sonico The Animation	Emi		
2015	Akame ga Kill!	Sayo		
2015	Love, Chunibyo & Other Delusions! Heart Throb	Rikka Takanashi		
2015	Hamatora: The Animation	Honey		
2015	Parasyte -the maxim-	Makiko Hayase		
2015	Black Bullet	Miori Shiba		
2015	Chaika - The Coffin Princess	Yulia		
2016	Monthly Girls' Nozaki-kun	Art Club President		
2016	Hakuoki – Theatrical Version, Chapter 2: Warrior Spirit of the Blue Sky	Kosuzu		
2016	HaNaYaMaTa	Arisa Kajiwara		
2016	Bodacious Space Pirates: Abyss of Hyperspace	Ai Hoshiyama, Maki Harada		
2016	Re: Hamatora	Honey		
2016	Log Horizon 2	Isuzu		
2016	Little Busters! EX	Haruka Saigusa		
2017	Girls und Panzer: This is the Real Anzio Battle!	Miho Nishizumi		
2017	Utawarerumono: The False Faces	Entua		
2017	Armed Girl's Machiavellism	Cho-ka		
2017	Tamako Love Story	Tamako Kitashirakawa		
2017	Hitorijime My Hero	Matsuzawa		
2017	My Girlfriend Is Shobitch	Misaki Aikawa		
2017	Food Wars! Shokugeki no Soma	Yua Sasaki, Akari Miyano		
2017	UQ Holder	Tena Vita		
2017	Love, Chunibyo & Other Delusions! Rikka Version	Rikka Takanashi		
2018	Death March to the Parallel World Rhapsody	Tama		
2018	Citrus	Harumi Taniguchi		
2018	Food Wars! The Second Plate	Yua Sasaki		
2018	Bloom Into You	Natsuki Sonomura		
2018	Junji Ito Collection	Ogawa		
2018	To Love Ru	Risa Momioka		
2018	Death March to the Parallel World Rhapsody	Tama		
2019	Love Stage!!	Miho, Sugirin		
2019	Afterlost	Kana		
2019	Dr. Stone	Garnet		
2019	Cutie Honey Universe	Momomi Wareme		
2019	Kämpfer	Disemboweled Tiger		
2019-2020	My Youth Romantic Comedy Is Wrong, As I Expected	Saika Totsuka		
2020	Shirobako	Tsubaki Andō		
2021	That Time I Got Reincarnated as a Slime (season 2)	Kagali		
2022	My Isekai Life	Lily		
2024	Chained Soldier	Yachiho		

=== Film ===
List of voice performances in films
Year	Title	Role	Notes	Source
2014	Mardock Scramble: The Third Exhaust	Shell's Girlfriend		
2016	Girls und Panzer der Film	Miho Nishizumi		
2016	Bodacious Space Pirates: Abyss of Hyperspace	Ai Hoshiyama, Maki Harada		
2017	Tamako Love Story	Tamako Kitashirakawa		
2018	Love, Chunibyo & Other Delusions! Take on Me	Rikka Takanashi		

=== Video games ===
List of voice performances in video games
Year	Title	Role	Notes	Source
2020	World's End Club	Reycho		
