= Love, Chunibyo & Other Delusions season 1 =

2012 Japanese television season

Love, Chunibyo & Other Delusions
- Season 1
- No. of episodes: 12

Release
- Original network: Tokyo MX, Sun TV, KBS, TV Aichi, Animax, BS11
- Original release: October 4 – December 20, 2012

Season chronology
- Next → Heart Throb

Love, Chunibyo & Other Delusions is an anime television series based on Torako's light novel series of the same name and produced by Kyoto Animation. The first season of the series aired in Japan from October 4 to December 19, 2012. A short series of original net animation, Love, Chunibyo & Other Delusions Lite, was streamed on YouTube between September 27 and November 1, 2012. An animated film served as a retelling of the series was released on September 14, 2013. The series was released on six Blu-ray and DVD compilation volumes by Pony Canyon, between December 19, 2012, and May 15, 2013. The volumes contained bonus shorts, Depth of Field: Love and Hate Theater. A seventh volume with the original video animation episode and the Lite shorts, were released on June 19, 2013. Sentai Filmworks licensed the series. It was streamed on the Anime Network.

The opening theme is "Sparkling Daydream" by Zaq, and the ending theme is "Inside Identity" by Black Raison d'être. The season has three insert songs, including "Hajimari no Tane" (始まりの種; The Seed of Start) by Zaq in episode 8, and "Kimi no Tonari ni" (君のとなりに; Next to You) by Zaq and "Miagete Goran Yoru no Hoshi o" (見上げてごらん夜の星を; Look Up at the Stars in the Night) by Maaya Uchida in episode 10. The single for "Sparkling Daydream" was released on October 24, 2012, and "Inside Identity" on November 21, 2012. For the Lite episodes, the opening theme "Kimi e" (君へ; To You) and the ending theme "Shikkoku ni Odoru Haōbushi" (漆黒に躍る弧濁覇王節; The Melody of Conqueror Dancing in Jet Black), are sung by Zaq.

== Episodes ==
Story	Episode	Title	Original release date
1	1	"Chance Encounter... with Wicked Lord Shingan"; Transliteration: "Kaikō no... Jaō Shingan" (Japanese: 邂逅の…邪王真眼)	October 4, 2012
After discarding his past grandiose delusions during junior high school, Yūta Togashi sees his upstairs female neighbor named Rikka Takanashi descending down the apartment balcony. Yūta travels by train to his first day of high school and befriends male classmate Makoto Isshiki, who scouts for the cutest girls in class. Yūta sees Rikka exhibiting her own signs of chūnibyō syndrome, resulting in him escorting her to the school infirmary. He realizes that she previously eavesdropped on him getting his delusions out of his system. Despite Yūta having no interest in reliving his delusions, Rikka claims him as her soulmate. After the opening ceremony, Yūta is invited by Makoto to grab a bite to eat, but he is asked by homeroom teacher Nanase Tsukumo to walk Rikka home instead, since she moved in with her older sister Tōka Takanashi away from their grandparents two days ago. After taking the train home, Yūta's younger sister Kuzuha Togashi tells Yūta that a bunch of items belonging to Rikka were delivered to the apartment. After Yūta helps Rikka move the boxes into her apartment, she asks him to keep his discarded memorabilia.
2	2	"Priestess... of the Melody"; Transliteration: "Senritsu no... Purīsutesu" (Japanese: 旋律の…聖調理人（プリーステス）)	October 11, 2012
Rikka finds a stray cat in a playground, believing it to be a chimera, though she cannot keep it in her apartment due to Tōka's allergy to cats and Yūta's refusal to keep it. After a student council meeting, Yūta finds himself nervous around class representative Shinka Nibutani in the school kitchen, but Rikka makes it more awkward when she shows up. Soon after, another student named Kumin Tsuyuri inquires about the stray cat, since she was looking for her lost cat named Dodomen. Yūta and Kumin go inside Rikka's bedroom, filled with all sorts of oddities, though the stray cat turns out not to be Dodomen. Tōka suddenly chases Rikka from her bedroom into Yūta's bedroom below, and Rikka is consequently knocked out after trying to evade. Threatening to expose Yūta's previous recorded chūnibyō behavior, Tōka asks Yūta to abandon the stray cat. However, as Rikka runs off with the stray cat, Yūta and Kumin leave with the recording device. Tōka approaches them at the playground and defeats Rikka. Afterward, Yūta agrees to keep the stray cat at his apartment.
3	3	"The Heretical… Pigtailed Girl"; Transliteration: "Itan Naru... Tsuintēru" (Japanese: 異端なる…双尾娘（ツインテール）)	October 18, 2012
It has been a month since Yūta joined high school. During lunchtime, Yūta notices how picky Rikka is with her food, even to the point of her feeding him a bit of "tainted" rice. During club presentations, Yūta becomes curious about what club to join, but he meets near the ginkgo tree on school grounds with Rikka, who wants to start the Far East Magical Society, though no members sign up besides Kumin, who has started the Napping Club. After trying out for the Cheerleading Club and the Theater Club, Rikka calls for "backup", something which Yūta fears could be trouble. The next day, Rikka's similarly delusional best friend Sanae Dekomori shows up in Yūta's bedroom, and Rikka explains that Sanae will join the Far East Magical Society. Despite lacking a fifth member, Nanase offers Yūta, Rikka, Kumin, and Sanae a provisional classroom as a clubroom on the condition that they clean it up, approving them as a club. As Yūta denies wanting to join the club himself, his resolve soon falters when Shinka decides to join the club, as its name is changed to the Far East Magical Napping Society Summer Thereof.
4	4	"Regret of... the Mabinogion"; Transliteration: "Tsūkon no... Mabinogion" (Japanese: 痛恨の…闇聖典（マビノギオン）)	October 25, 2012
During a quiz, Yūta becomes curious about why Shinka would join the club. Rikka and Sanae bring Yūta to the clubroom, where they simulate a spell from a fake summoning circle. When Shinka arrives at the clubroom, Sanae realizes that a notebook called the Mabinogion has gone missing. Shinka then asks Yūta if she can go to his apartment on Sunday. Yūta attempts to send Rikka and Sanae on a wild-goose chase that day. As Shinka arrives at the apartment, she frantically ravishes his bedroom in search of the Mabinogion. After finding the notebook, Yūta discovers that it is a journal from her chūnibyō persona Mori Summer, which she tears into pieces from embarrassment. As Shinka burns the Mabinogion, she reveals that she joined the club just to discard it, but she is shocked to learn that Sanae has kept multiple copies. With Sanae refusing to believe that Shinka is the real Mori Summer, Yūta suggests that Shinka should appeal to Sanae's delusions on an overpass, but Shinka ultimately cracks under the pressure. She reluctantly decides to stay in the club until she plans to remove the evidence from Sanae.
5	5	"A Binding... Hard Study"; Transliteration: "Sokubaku no... Hādo Sutadi" (Japanese: 束縛の…十字架（ハード・スタディ）)	November 1, 2012
After having a low score on her math midterm exam, Rikka is told by Nanase that she is faced with her club being disbanded if she fails the math semester exam. With Rikka not taking her studies seriously, it is revealed that Sanae is the top student in her grade. Rikka tries to improve the club's status by volunteering to clean the school swimming pool. However, it backfires due to horseplay for three hours. Instead, Nanase informs Rikka that she will need to make the class average in order to keep the club. Yūta attempts to help Rikka study in her bedroom, but she keeps getting distracted. During a break, Yūta and Rikka exchange email addresses. Yūta offers to come up with a new email address for Rikka should she pass her test, using various bribes each day for a week to get her to study harder. After the math semester exam, Rikka ends up scoring relatively low but manages to land just above the class average, prompting Yūta to create a new email address for her.
6	6	"The Atoned... Innocent"; Transliteration: "Shokuzai no... Inosento" (Japanese: 贖罪の…救世主(イノセント))	November 8, 2012
During art class, Yūta and Rikka draw pictures of each other, with mixed responses from other classmates. Afterwards, Makoto asks Yūta for advice concerning an anonymous love letter that he received, assuming that Shinka wrote it. Later at the clubroom, Yūta bears witness to Shinka's true nature as she feuds with Sanae. When Makoto soon arrives, Shinka promptly tells him to forget what he saw. Unfortunately, Makoto drops his notepad about the ranking of the girls in school near the train station. It is soon found by a classmate named Inomata and is brought to the attention of the class the next day. Makoto reluctantly owns up to the notepad in order to protect the other boys, unintentionally offering to shave his head in apology. Despite his plea not to go through with it, Makoto is given a buzz cut by Yūta in the clubroom. Makoto goes to the ginkgo tree and is surprisingly welcomed by the support of the other boys from his class. He later develops a crush on Kumin, who is fond of his new look. That night, Tōka invites Yūta and Rikka to join her on summer vacation.
7	7	"Reminiscences... of Paradise Lost"; Transliteration: "Tsuioku no... Paradaisu Rosuto" (Japanese: 追憶の…楽園喪失(パラダイス・ロスト))	November 15, 2012
Yūta, Rikka, Shinka, Kumin, Sanae, and Makoto travel by train as they begin their summer vacation. However, Yūta notices that Rikka seems awfully quiet. Upon meeting Rikka and Tōka's grandparents in a cottage, everyone gets acquainted. Yūta learns that Rikka used to live with her grandparents against her will two years ago. After hanging out at the beach, Yūta learns that Rikka and Tōka's father died from an illness three years ago, and it is pointed out that Rikka has declined the death of her father and had refused to visit his grave. Rikka skips out on Tōka's prepared dinner, much to Yūta's worry. Helping her escape from Tōka at the cottage, Yūta takes Rikka to a neighborhood believed to be where her father was three years ago. They arrive at the house where Rikka grew up, only to find a vacant lot. Tōka arrives and reminds Rikka about the reality of the situation.
8	8	"Exiled... Just the Two of Them"; Transliteration: "Futari dake no... Eguzairu" (Japanese: 二人だけの…逃避行(エグザイル))	November 22, 2012
During their "battle", Tōka forces Rikka to accept the disappearance of their former house and the death of their father. Yūta tells Tōka that Rikka's delusions are not intended to ignore the truth. Rikka runs away, forcing Yūta to eventually find her on a train headed back home. On the way, Yūta explains to Rikka that he started his chūnibyō behavior when he was isolated from his former friends. Upon arrival at home, Rikka realizes that she forgot her apartment key and Yūta's family is out for the night, meaning that the two will be alone together overnight. Yūta and Rikka go to the corner store to get some food. When Makoto and Kumin later go there, Makoto contacts Yūta for advice, leading Yūta to contemplate if he is in love with Rikka. As Yūta tries to go to sleep while putting those thoughts behind him, Rikka appears to be harboring her own feelings for Yūta.
9	9	"A Confused... Chaos Heart"; Transliteration: "Konton no... Kaosu Hāto" (Japanese: 混沌の…初恋煩(カオス・ハート))	November 29, 2012
Shinka wants the club to actually do something for the upcoming cultural festival called the ginkgo festival, but Yūta has not had a proper talk with Rikka since summer vacation. As the theme is revealed to be a performance starring Yūta and Rikka, the others become worried when they find out that the two have been each other since the beach. With Yūta worried that Rikka is still troubled over what happened, he tries to comfort her during lunchtime, but she avoids him. After telling Kumin that Yūta is possessed by some evil force, Rikka soon recruits Sanae to perform a ritual on him at the shrine, which he naturally sees through. Meanwhile, Shinka tells Kumin that Rikka is actually in love with Yūta. Shinka later convinces Rikka to admit her feelings and confess to Yūta. After many failed attempts to confess her feelings, Rikka is saved by Yūta from falling off the school roof.
10	10	"Holy Mother's... Pandora's Box"; Transliteration: "Seibo no... Pandorazu Bokkusu" (Japanese: 聖母の…弁当箱（パンドラズ・ボックス）)	December 6, 2012
Rikka mentions her feelings for Yūta to Sanae, while Yūta asks Makoto for advice on confessing to Rikka. After school, Yūta and Rikka try to work up the courage to confess to each other. Despite the initial awkwardness, Rikka manages to confess first. Upon arriving home, Yūta meets with Tōka at a restaurant, where she reveals that she will be doing culinary training in Italy, meaning Rikka will be looked after by her mother, who was largely ignored by her following her father's death. Because of this, Tōka asks Yūta to help Rikka grow out of her chūnibyō phase so she can get along with her mother. On the day of the ginkgo festival, Yūta and Rikka dress up in costume preparing for their roles in the performance. Yūta soon runs into Rikka's mother, who passes on a boxed lunch for Rikka, and Yūta later ends up telling Rikka to remove her eyepatch, which does not settle well with her. During the after-party, Rikka gets on stage and performs her father's favorite song. She takes off her eyepatch to reveal that she is no longer wearing her golden contact on her right eye.
11	11	"One-Winged Fallen Angel"; Transliteration: "Katayoku no Fōrin Enjeru" (Japanese: 片翼の堕天使（フォーリン·エンジェル）)	December 13, 2012
While Tōka goes to Italy, it has been three weeks since Rikka removed her eyepatch. She struggles to adjust to "normalcy", but Sanae is less than happy about it on the way to school. In the library, Shinka questions Yūta if he regrets helping Rikka, but he realizes that Tōka stopped worrying and things are going well with Rikka's mother. With Rikka making new friends at school, she announces to Shinka, Sanae, and Makoto that the club is disbanded, much to Sanae's dismay. Later on, Yūta helps Rikka clear out her chūnibyō collectibles from her bedroom in order to prepare for her mother's arrival, but he begins to wonder if he is doing the right thing. After Rikka boards a train to visit her father's grave, Sanae confronts Yūta about how Rikka had wanted him to accept her chūnibyō persona. Despite feeling the same way, Yūta ends up lashing out at Sanae instead, believing it would be no good even if he told Rikka.
12	12	"Eternal Engage"; Transliteration: "Shūten no Etānaru Engēji" (Japanese: 終天の契約（エターナル·エンゲージ）)	December 20, 2012
As Yūta worries about having not seen Rikka in a while, Sanae discards her chūnibyō persona whilst Kumin starts impersonating Rikka, much to Yūta's chagrin. After the clubroom is cleared out, Shinka confides in Yūta that having a chūnibyō persona is like being in the Drama Club. At night, Yūta learns that Rikka has moved in with her mother and grandparents. While feeling guilty, Yūta reads a letter from his past self and decides to get Rikka. Along the way, he encounters Kumin, who relays a message from Rikka about how she had previously met him two years ago, around the time after her father died, coming to admire his chūnibyō syndrome and starting her own. As Yūta arrives at the cottage, Yūta reunites with Rikka, and he accepts their chūnibyō personas. After a run-in with the police, Yūta brings Rikka to the "Invisible Boundary Line", giving her the opportunity to say goodbye to her father. Rikka soon resumes her chūnibyō act, despite Yūta still finding it a little embarrassing.
13 (OVA)	13	"Glimmering... Explosive Festival (Slapstick Noël)"; Transliteration: "Kirameki no... Surappusutikku Noeru" (Japanese: 煌めきの… 聖爆誕祭（スラップスティック・ノエル）)	June 19, 2013 (BD/DVD); December 25, 2013 (TV)
The gang plans to throw a Christmas party in the clubroom, but since Nanase forbids this due to the school closing on Christmas Eve, the backup plan is to have the Christmas party at Sanae's mansion. The girls try on unique outfits, yet the guys are concerned. During a game of cards, Rikka and Sanae get drunk from eating some chocolate rum cake, resulting in a "battle" that Yūta gets caught up in. After Rikka becomes tired, Yūta carries her home with him. However, they first take a special boat ride at an amusement park to spend quality time, surprisingly meeting the rest of the gang there. The still intoxicated Sanae causes a commotion about how Rikka keeps talking about Yūta. Sanae almost pushes Rikka from the boat ride, but Yūta saves Rikka in time, while Sanae falls over and accidentally kisses Shinka. Back at home, Yūta sees Rikka wearing a black dress and a Santa hat.

=== Lite episodes ===
Story	Episode	Title	Original release date
1	1	"Volleyball"; Transliteration: "Barēbōru" (Japanese: バレーボール)	September 27, 2012
Yūta Togashi attempts to train Rikka Takanashi in playing volleyball and compensate for her lack of depth perception since she wears an eyepatch.
2	2	"Wicked Eye: Daybreak Chapter"; Transliteration: "Jaō Shingan Reimeihen" (Japanese: 邪王真眼・黎明篇)	October 4, 2012
During a period of one week in junior high school, Rikka explains to her friend Tomo about the "Denizens of the Dark", in which Tomo deals with Rikka's slow descent into chūnibyō syndrome.
3	3	"My Older Brother"; Transliteration: "Watashi no Onii-chan" (Japanese: わたしのお兄ちゃん)	October 11, 2012
Kuzuha Togashi deals with Yūta during his chūnibyō persona around family as well as around her friend Mika.
4	4	"We'll Make Meat and Potato Stew!"; Transliteration: "Niku-jaga Tsukuru yo!" (Japanese: 肉じゃが作るよ！)	October 18, 2012
Rikka and Yūta's little sister Yumeha Togashi buy the ingredients for the beef stew at the supermarket.
5	5	"The Sleeping After School Beauty"; Transliteration: "Nemureru Hōkago no Bishōjo" (Japanese: 眠れる放課後の美少女)	October 25, 2012
Kumin Tsuyuri narrates the story about her hobby of excessive napping and her observations of the other club members inside the clubroom.
6	6	"Dekomori vs. Nibutani"; Transliteration: "Dekomori VS Nibutani" (Japanese: 凸守 VS 丹生谷)	November 1, 2012
When Shinka Nibutani and Sanae Dekomori had a cold body temperature from having a water balloon fight at school, they are forced to take a hot bath together.

=== Depth of Field: Ai to Nikushimi Gekijō ===
Story	Episode	Title	Original release date
1	1	"Depth of Field: Love and Hate Theater Phase 1"	December 19, 2012
Rikka Takanashi and Sanae Dekomori face each other in an epic mecha battle in an apocalyptic parallel world.
2	2	"Depth of Field: Love and Hate Theater Phase 2"	January 16, 2013
Six hours and twenty-four minutes earlier, Sanae confronts Rikka before boarding her ultimate mech, Décolleté.
3	3	"Depth of Field: Love and Hate Theater Phase 3"	February 20, 2013
After dodging Sanae's advances, Rikka boards her own mech, Königin der Nacht, and returns fire.
4	4	"Depth of Field: Love and Hate Theater Phase 4"	March 20, 2013
A flashback reveals that Rikka betrayed her army because her superiors ordered her to attack civilians, before Rikka and Sanae resume the fight.
5	5	"Depth of Field: Love and Hate Theater Phase 5"	April 17, 2013
While fighting, a glimpse shows Sanae and Rikka getting along with together in a field, though Sanae plans to defeat Rikka.
6	6	"Depth of Field: Love and Hate Theater Last Phase"	May 15, 2013
Sanae and Rikka end up with a final standoff, but Rikka deactivates Königin der Nacht and loses the battle. In reality, Sanae and Rikka spend a day in the clubroom while wearing cardboard boxes.
7	7	"Depth of Field: Love and Hate Theater Extra Phase"	June 19, 2013
Rikka imagines a scene where Sanae kidnaps Yūta Togashi, but Rikka tickles Sanae.

=== Films ===
Episode	Title	Original release date
Film	"Love, Chunibyo & Other Delusions the Movie: Rikka Takanashi Revision"; Transliteration: "Takanashi Rikka Kai: Gekijō-ban Chūnibyō Demo Koi ga Shitai!" (Japanese: 小鳥遊六花・改 ～劇場版 中二病でも恋がしたい!～)	September 14, 2013 (theater); February 19, 2014 (BD/DVD)
After Rikka Takanashi wakes up in the clubroom from having a nightmare about a wedding, she tells Sanae Dekomori and Kumin Tsuyuri the story about how she first met Yūta Togashi, and how they ended up bound to one another. The film is a retelling of the first season told from Rikka's perspective. There are transition scenes for the second season, which includes Yūta's childhood friend Satone Shichimiya arriving from the train.
Lite	"My Older Brother 2"; Transliteration: "Watashi no Onii-chan 2" (Japanese: わたしのお兄ちゃん2)	September 14, 2013 (theater); February 19, 2014 (BD/DVD)
After continuing to observe Yūta during his chūnibyō persona while playing cards, Kuzuha Togashi witnesses him inadvertently slipping on an empty soda can and jamming his foot against a pole outside his apartment. Despite being hospitalized on crutches, he treats the fractured foot like it is already healed. Both Kuzuha and her friend Mika witness Yūta fail in his attempt to kick a soccer ball back to a group of boys.
