= Love, Chunibyo & Other Delusions =

Japanese light novel series

- Love, Chunibyo & Other Delusions!
- Cover of the first light novel volume featuring Yūta (left) and Rikka (right)

中二病でも恋がしたい! (Chūnibyō demo Koi ga Shitai!)
- Genre: Romantic comedy
- Light novel
- Written by: Torako
- Illustrated by: Nozomi Ōsaka
- Published by: Kyoto Animation
- Imprint: KA Esuma Bunko
- Original run: June 1, 2011 – December 4, 2017
- Volumes: 4
- Anime
- Love, Chunibyo & Other Delusions (2012–2014); Love, Chunibyo & Other Delusions!: Rikka Version (2013); Love, Chunibyo & Other Delusions! Take on Me (2018)
- icon

Love, Chunibyo & Other Delusions! (Japanese: 中二病でも恋がしたい!, Hepburn: Chūnibyō demo Koi ga Shitai!; "Even with Eighth-Grader Syndrome, I Want to Be in Love"), also known as Chū-2 for short, is a Japanese light novel series written by Torako, with illustrations provided by Nozomi Ōsaka. The work won an honorable mention in the Kyoto Animation Award competition in 2010, leading the company to assume its publication starting in June 2011. The series follows Yūta Togashi, a high school boy who tries to discard his embarrassing past grandiose delusions. However, he meets Rikka Takanashi, a girl who exhibits her own signs of eighth-grader syndrome. As their relationship progresses, they form a club called the Far East Magical Napping Society Summer Thereof with classmates Shinka Nibutani, Kumin Tsuyuri, and Sanae Dekomori, who each have their own unique delusional behaviors.

A 12-episode anime adaptation produced by Kyoto Animation aired in Japan from October to December 2012, with six six-minute Lite episodes streamed on YouTube. The anime is licensed by Sentai Filmworks for release in North America. An animated compilation film was released in September 2013, and a second anime season, Love, Chunibyo & Other Delusions -Heart Throb-, aired from January to March 2014. A second animated film, Love, Chunibyo & Other Delusions! Take on Me, was released in 2018.

== Plot ==
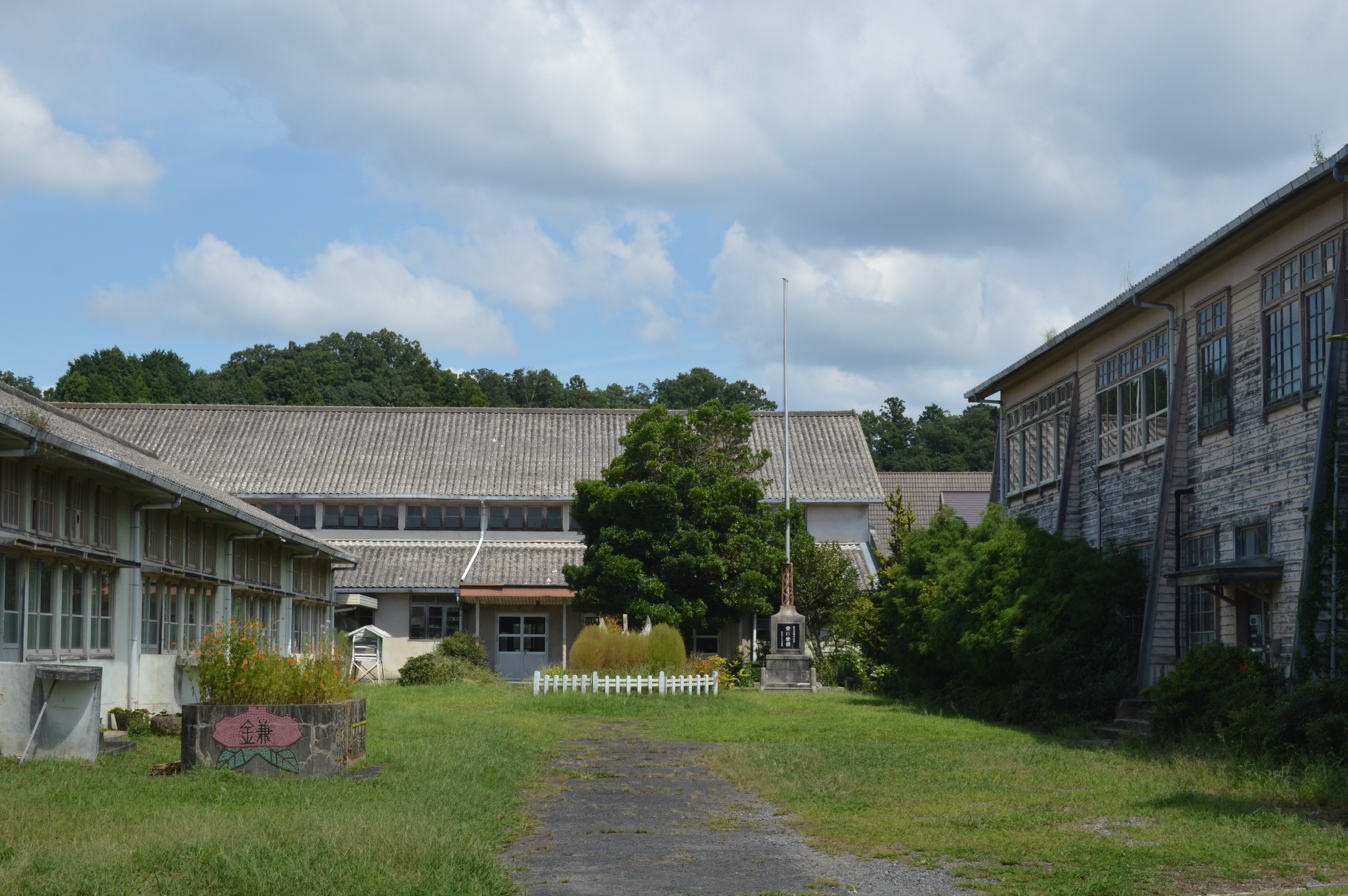
The former Kyu Kaikage Elementary School in Hino, Shiga, used as a model for Icho Private High School

Yūta Togashi is a boy who, during junior high school, suffered from "chūnibyō", believing that he possessed supernatural powers and calling himself the "Dark Flame Master", therefore alienating himself from his classmates. Finding his past embarrassing, Yūta attempts to start off high school where he does not know anyone, free from his old delusions. This proves to be difficult, however, as a delusional girl in his class, Rikka Takanashi, learns of Yūta's past and becomes interested in him.

As the plot progresses, Rikka becomes more attached to Yūta, who, despite finding her delusions irritating and embarrassing, accepts her. He helps Rikka with a number of things, including founding and maintaining her club and tutoring her. The club in question, the "Far-East Magical Napping Society – Summer Thereof", also includes current chūnibyō Sanae Dekomori; former chūnibyō Shinka Nibutani; and the constantly sleeping Kumin Tsuyuri. When Yūta joins Rikka on her summer vacation, Yūta learns that two years prior, Rikka's father, to whom she was very close, died unexpectedly due to a terminal illness, causing her to fall into her delusions. After Yūta agrees to help Rikka search for the "Ethereal Horizon" (不可視境界線, Fukashi Kyōkaisen), which she believes will lead her to her father, she becomes romantically interested in Yūta and vice versa.

== Characters ==
Yūta Togashi (富樫 勇太, Togashi Yūta)
Voiced by: Jun Fukuyama (Japanese); Leraldo Anzaldua (English)
The narrator of the light novels. He is a first-year high school student who used to be delusional, calling himself the "Dark Flame Master" while in junior high and becoming alienated from everyone as a result. He attempts to bury his past by enrolling in a high school far away from his junior high classmates. However, after encountering Rikka, his past delusions come back to haunt him. He ends up joining the club and becomes friends with Rikka's cohorts as well as school beauty Shinka Nibutani.^{LN 1} He and Rikka eventually become closer and start dating. In the anime film, Yūta gives Rikka a ring to show "proof" that he will stay with her. He and Satone Shichimiya were also classmates in junior high and she was the one who inspired him to become the "Dark Flame Master".^{LN 2} A running gag in the anime series shows him hitting Rikka on the head with his hands or any objects.
Rikka Takanashi (小鳥遊 六花, Takanashi Rikka)
Voiced by: Maaya Uchida (Japanese); Margaret McDonald (English)
Yūta's classmate and neighbor residing above the apartment. She is an intensely delusional girl who believes herself to possess a "Wicked Eye" (邪王真眼, Jaō Shingan; lit. Tyrant's Eye of Truth), and as such always wears a eyepatch over her right eye and wrapped bandages around her left arm without injuries. Despite being quite attached to Yūta, she is cautious of strangers and adopts a battle pose whenever she meets someone for the first time. Her fantasy weapon of choice is a frilly parasol which she wields as a sword. For her delusional operations, she often dresses in a mostly-black gothic dress. At school, she wears a uniform with a frilly skirt, long black knee socks, and roller shoes. She is also rather clumsy, often tripping over and forgetting things.^{LN 1} The origin of her delusions came from her father's death three years prior, where she was forced to live with her father's family until she moved in with her sister.^{Ep. 7–8} They also come from Yūta himself, when she saw Yūta in his delusional phase at the balcony above the apartment. Although initially finding each other annoying and unreliable, they eventually develop feelings for one another and start dating, but Rikka's delusions appear to keep their relationship from progressing. A running gag in the series reveals that she visits Yūta by descending a balcony with a rope.^{LN 1}
Shinka Nibutani (丹生谷 森夏, Nibutani Shinka)
Voiced by: Chinatsu Akasaki (Japanese); Maggie Flecknoe (English)
Yūta's classmate and one of the most popular girls in the class. She is the class representative and a member of the cheerleading club. She wears a hairclip on her bangs. Although Shinka is generally thought of as a kind and gentle girl, she is later revealed to be a former chūnibyō by the name of Morisummer (モリサマー, Morisamā) and had also chosen a different high school from her previous classmates to escape her past. In the anime series, when she learns Sanae is in possession of the Mabinogion, a blog penned by Shinka during her chūnibyō phase, she joins Rikka's school club in order to try and retrieve it, but gives up when she learns that Sanae has kept multiple backup copies.^{Ep. 4} When out of the public eye, Shinka shows her true nature to be bit more bitter and easily irritable, particularly when dealing with Sanae,^{Ep. 5} but they eventually care for each other^{S1 Ep. 11, OVA} and she is genuinely a kind-hearted person who loves and cares about her friends, and she will help them if needed.^{S1 Ep. 9-12, S2} She later quits the cheerleading club to focus more on making herself popular.^{Ep. 9}
Kumin Tsuyuri (五月七日 くみん, Tsuyuri Kumin)
Voiced by: Azumi Asakura (Japanese); Emily Neves (English)
An anime original character. She is a carefree girl who is a year above Yūta and the others. She loves sleeping and often carrying around a pillow with her wherever she goes. In one extreme case, she is even shown sleeping in a full futon on school grounds.^{Ep. 2-3} Having been home-schooled before high school, she is very sheltered and conservative, lending her an old-fashioned ladylike demeanor which Makoto finds attractive.^{Ep. 7} Her own "Nap Club" is integrated into Rikka's social group for lack of members.^{Ep. 3} She earnestly attempts to understand Rikka and Sanae's delusional fantasies. She has a tendency to sleep-talk. She is also quite fond of cats and often naps curled up like a cat.^{Ep. 5}
Sanae Dekomori (凸守 早苗, Dekomori Sanae)
Voiced by: Sumire Uesaka (Japanese); Brittney Karbowski (English)
An anime original character. She is Rikka's best friend. She is a third-year junior high student with a long blonde elastic twintails that often prove to be more of a hindrance than a help. Like Rikka, she is extremely delusional and often indulges in fantasy with her.^{Ep. 3} Unlike Rikka, she is a superb student who is at the top of her class and has already completed the entire junior-high mathematics curriculum.^{Ep. 5} She owns several copies of a spell book which is the remaining evidence of Shinka's delusional days. She is often at odds with Shinka, whom she does not believe to be the real Morisummer.^{Ep. 4} In the Japanese dub, she often ends her sentences with 'desu', emphasizing it to make it sound more like 'death'.^{Ep. 3} She dislikes dairy products, even though she is forced to drink the milk and grow tall.^{Ep. 5-7} She is aware that her delusions are nothing more than delusions.^{Ep. 11} She comes from a very rich family and tends to behave normally around her classmates. She later promotes to the high school where Yūta and friends are studying.
Makoto Isshiki (一色 誠, Isshiki Makoto)
Voiced by: Sōichirō Hoshi (Japanese); Greg Ayres (English)
Yūta's classmate who becomes interested with other girls at school.^{LN 1} He joins the Light Music Club so he could be with girls and attract their attention by carrying about his guitar, though he does not seem to have learned how to play it.^{LN 1} Fond of his thick hair after being forced to wear it short for sports activities for the last three years, he is forced to have his head shaved once more when his notebook containing the "Cutie Poll" of the girls in his class is discovered.^{Ep. 6} In the anime, he develops a crush on Kumin after she becomes fond of petting his buzz cut hair.^{Ep. 6-7}
Kuzuha Togashi (富樫 樟葉, Togashi Kuzuha)
Voiced by: Kaori Fukuhara (Japanese); Monica Rial (English)
Yūta's younger sister attending the first year of junior high school.^{LN 1} She is mature for her age.
Yumeha Togashi (富樫 夢葉, Togashi Yumeha)
Voiced by: Mami Shitara (Japanese); Ashley Miller (season 1) (English), Emily Neves (season 2) (English)
Yūta's youngest sister. She finds Yūta's prior fantasy antics intriguing, often refers to them as "cool" and admires or idolizes Rikka.^{LN 1}
Nanase Tsukumo (九十九 七瀬, Tsukumo Nanase)
Voiced by: Kikuko Inoue (Japanese); Carli Mosier (English)
Yūta and Rikka's homeroom teacher. She is often kind, if sometimes a little sadistic in teasing her students, particularly Rikka. She is called "Nana-chan" by Yūta and Rikka.^{LN 1}
Satone Shichimiya (七宮 智音, Shichimiya Satone)
Voiced by: Juri Nagatsuma (Japanese); Christina Kelly (English)
Yūta's former junior high school classmate. She first appeared in the second light novel and the anime's second season.^{LN 2} She is depicted as having a cheerful, fun-loving personality.^{Ep. 16} Although she considers Yūta to be her best friend, she ended up transferring schools without saying goodbye during their second junior high school year. She transferred to Shinka's junior high school where they became close. She suffers from delusions, calls herself "Sophia Ring SP Saturn VII" (ソフィアリング・SP・サターン7世), and addresses Yūta with the nickname "Yūsha" (勇者; lit. 'Hero'). Yūta and Shinka's delusions began with their admiration, and mimicry of Satone's behavior. During her time with Yūta in junior high school, she developed feelings for him, but chose to push those feelings aside and stay as "Sophia Ring SP Saturn VII" and the "Magical Devil Girl" forever.^{LN 2} She makes Rikka jealous sometimes when she shows affection for Yūta.
Hideri Amaniji (天虹 旱, Amaniji Hideri)
An upperclassman of Rikka and Yūta. She is a main character in the third light novel. She attends the Eccentric Drama Club.^{LN 3, 4}
Tōka Takanashi (小鳥遊 十花, Takanashi Tōka)
Voiced by: Eri Sendai (Japanese); Genevieve Simmons (English)
An anime original character and Rikka's older sister. She supports her becoming a chef at a fine restaurant. She often has to put up with her younger sister's delusional antics, often punishing her by whacking her with a ladle.^{Ep. 2} She is also seen to be extremely acrobatic and flexible, which she attributes to being a rhythmic gymnast when she herself was in high school.^{Ep. 9} Rikka depicts her sister as a high priestess of evil and accuses Tōka of restraining her from her quest to reach the "Invisible Boundary Line".^{Ep. 2} In one instance, she was playing house with Yūta's youngest sister Yumeha, but had a negative outlook where they divorced.^{Ep. 5}
Kazari Kannagi (巫部 風鈴, Kannagi Kazari)
Voiced by: Manami Shirakawa (Japanese); Molly Searcy (English)
Yūta's classmate from the novels and the class idol. She was in second place in Makoto's ranking of the most beautiful girls in his school, although still remains the centre of attention. She had a close relationship with Shinka in junior high school.

== Media ==
=== Light novels ===
The series began as a light novel series written by Torako, with illustrations by Nozomi Ōsaka. Torako entered the first novel in the series into the first Kyoto Animation Award contest in 2010, and it won an honorable mention in the novel category. Kyoto Animation published four volumes under their KA Esuma Bunko imprint from June 2011 to December 2017.

No.	Release date	ISBN
1	June 1, 2011	978-4-9905812-0-6
2	December 28, 2011	978-4-9905812-2-0
3	March 14, 2014	978-4-907064-14-3
4	December 4, 2017	978-4-907064-76-1

=== Anime ===
A 12-episode anime television series adaptation, directed by Tatsuya Ishihara and produced by Kyoto Animation, aired in Japan from October 4 to December 19, 2012. Starting before the TV series' airing, a series of six original net animation shorts titled Love, Chunibyo & Other Delusions Lite were streamed weekly on YouTube between September 27 and November 1, 2012. The anime series were released on six BD/DVD compilation volumes, between December 19, 2012, and May 15, 2013. The volumes also contained bonus shorts titled Depth of Field: Ai to Nikushimi Gekijō (Depth of Field ～ 愛と憎しみ劇場; Depth of Field: Love and Hate Theater). A seventh volume, containing an original video animation episode, another Depth of Field short and the Lite shorts, was released on June 19, 2013. The series has been licensed in North America by Sentai Filmworks. It is currently streaming on Anime Network and Hidive. Sentai Filmworks released the series on subtitled DVD in North America on May 27, 2014, followed by an English dubbed release on DVD and Blu-ray Disc on February 24, 2015. In Southeast Asia, it was broadcast through Animax Asia and premiered on June 2, 2014.

The opening theme is "Sparkling Daydream" by Zaq, and the ending theme is "Inside Identity" by Black Raison d'être. There are also three insert songs: "Hajimari no Tane" (始まりの種; The Seed of Start) in episode eight and "Kimi no Tonari ni" (君のとなりに; Next to You) by Zaq in episode ten, and "Miagete Goran Yoru no Hoshi o" (見上げてごらん夜の星を; Look Up at the Stars in the Night) by Maaya Uchida in episode ten. The single for "Sparkling Daydream" was released on October 24, 2012, and the single for "Inside Identity" on November 21, 2012. For the Lite episodes, the opening theme is "Kimi e" (君へ; To You) and the ending theme is "Shikkoku ni Odoru Haōbushi" (漆黒に躍る弧濁覇王節; The Melody of Conqueror Dancing in Jet Black); both are sung by Zaq.

An anime film titled Love, Chunibyo and Other Delusions!: Rikka Version (小鳥遊六花・改 ～劇場版 中二病でも恋がしたい!～, Takanashi Rikka Kai: Gekijō-ban Chūnibyō Demo Koi ga Shitai!; lit. 'Love, Chunibyo & Other Delusions the Movie: Rikka Takanashi Revision'), served as the retelling story for the first season, was released on September 14, 2013, and was later released on Blu-ray Disc and DVD on February 19, 2014. Sentai Filmworks has licensed the film in North America.

A second anime television season, titled Love, Chunibyo & Other Delusions -Heart Throb- (中二病でも恋がしたい！戀, Chūnibyō Demo Koi ga Shitai! Ren), aired in Japan from January 8 to March 26, 2014, and was simulcast by Crunchyroll. Madman Entertainment started streaming the series on January 7, 2014, on Madman's Screening Room in Australia and New Zealand. The opening theme is "Voice" by Zaq and the ending theme is "Van!shment Th!s World" by Black Raison d'être. The first of a second series of Lite episodes was released on YouTube on December 26, 2013. The ending theme for the Lite episodes is "Shin'en ni Mau Senritsu Shanikusai" (深淵に舞う戦慄謝肉祭, A Hair-Raising Carnival Dancing in the Abyss) by Zaq. Animax Asia and Animax UK added the second season in early 2014. The second season has also been licensed by Sentai Filmworks, under the title Love, Chunibyo & Other Delusions -Heart Throb-. Sentai Filmworks released the second season on August 25, 2015. A Blu-ray set featuring the dubbed and subbed versions of both seasons was released on November 7, 2017. The second season was licensed by Animatsu Entertainment in the United Kingdom.

A second anime film, titled Love, Chunibyo & Other Delusions! Take on Me (映画 中二病でも恋がしたい! -Take on Me-, Eiga Chūnibyō demo Koi ga Shitai! Take on Me), was released on January 6, 2018. It is set after the second season and served as the finale of the anime series. The staff and cast from the original anime series returned to reprise their roles for the film.

Following the acquisition of Crunchyroll by Sony Pictures Television, the parent company of Funimation in 2021, the series was removed from the service on March 31, 2022.

== Notes ==
- "LN" is shortened form for light novel and refers to a volume number of the Love, Chunibyo & Other Delusions light novels.
- "Ch." and "Vol." is shortened form for chapter and volume, and refers to a chapter or volume number of the Love, Chunibyo & Other Delusions manga.
- "Ep." and "S" is shortened form for episode and season, and refers to an episode number of the Love, Chunibyo & Other Delusions anime television series.
