= Shining Hearts: Shiawase no Pan =

Japanese anime series

- Shining Hearts: Bread of Happiness

シャイニング・ハーツ ～幸せのパン～
- Genre: Anime, fantasy
- Created by: Sega
- Anime television series

Shining Hearts
- Directed by: Itsuro Kawasaki
- Produced by: Junichi Inaba; Kuniyoshi Shigeta; Masahiro Nakayama; Masanori Goto
- Written by: Itsuro Kawasaki
- Music by: Hiroki Kikuta
- Studio: Production I.G
- Licensed by: NA: Sentai Filmworks
- Original network: Mainichi Broadcasting System
- English network: Anime Network
- Original run: April 13, 2012 – June 28, 2012
- Episodes: 12

Shining Hearts: Shiawase no Pan (シャイニング・ハーツ ～幸せのパン～) is a Japanese anime television series based on the video game of the series.

== Synopsis ==
The series follows a group of bakers living in the island of Wyndaria.

== Cast ==
Characters	Japanese	English
Rick	Hiroshi Kamiya	Blake Shepard
Amil	Kanae Itō	Maggie Flecknoe
Neris	Mai Aizawa	Genevieve Simmons
Airy	Shiori Mikami	Brittney Karbowski
Kaguya	Houko Kuwashima	Caitlynn French
Xiao Mei	Chiwa Saitō	Molly Searcy
Rana	Ryō Hirohashi	Margaret McDonald
Alvin	Hiroshi Kamiya	Eric Daugherty
Hank	Masaharu Satō	George Manley
Madera	Hiroko Emori	Marcy Bannor
Melty	Rie Kugimiya	Hilary Haag
Sorbet	Tomoko Kaneda	Tiffany Grant
Ragnus	Hikaru Midorikawa	Greg Ayres
Rufina	Yui Horie	Juliet Simmons
Dylan	Kazuya Nakai	Andrew Love
Ron	Tomohisa Aso	John Swasey
Iria	Yūko Takayama	Carli Mosier
Shuu	Fuyuka Ono	Kalin Coates
Flora	Fuyuka Ono	Shelley Calene-Black
Queen	Izumi Kitta	Luci Christian
Sammy	Chika Fujito	Shelley Calene-Black
Vence	Binbin Takaoka	Christopher Ayres
Jean	Ryōta Ōsaka	Greg Ayres
Sylph	Chiwa Saitō	Tiffany Terrell

== Episode list ==
No.	Title
1	"Welcome to Le Couer" "Ru・Kūru Yōkoso" (ル・クールへようこそ)
The bakers sell pastries for customers.
2	"The Day of the Storm" "Arashi no Hi" (嵐の日)
The people take shelter from the storm.
3	"Blackout" "Tomoshibi Kansei" (灯火管制)
Rick finds a magical pendant.
4	"Mechanical Doll" "Kikai Ningyō" (機械人形)
The soldiers take the key part Hank needed for system reboot.
5	"As if Melting" "Torokeru Yōna" (とろけるような)
The girls visit Melty and Sorbet at the castle.
6	"Request from the Prince" "Ōji kara no Irai" (王子からの依頼)
Xiao Mei leaves the castle after being seen.
7	"Everyone's Heart" "Sorezore no Kokoro" (それぞれのココロ)
Rick forgets the past memories.
8	"Drifting Person" "Hyōryū Hito (Sasurai Bito)" (漂流人（さすらいびと）
Kaguya leaves the clinic.
9	"The Phantom Thief Again" "Kaitō Futarabi" (怪盗再び)
Hank uses the part to awaken Queen.
10	"Messenger from Another World" "Isekai kara no Shisha" (異世界からの使者)
Kaguya and Queen head to the ship without the pendant.
11	"The Decisive Battle" "Kessen" (決戦)
Rick, Queen, and the pirates infiltrate the ship.
12	"Bread Of Happiness" "Shiawase no Pan" (幸せのパン)
Rick saves Kaguya and Queen destroys the ship.
