= Juliet Simmons =

American voice actress

- Born: Juliet Grace Simmons; January 22, 1995 (age 31); Houston, Texas, U.S.
- Education: Lone Star College–CyFair
- Occupations: Voice actress; YouTuber; VTuber; musical artist
- Years active: 2013–present
- Relatives: Genevieve Simmons (sister)

YouTube information
- Channel: JubyPhonic
- Years active: 2012–present
- Genre: Anime music covers
- Subscribers: 1.21 million
- Views: 581 million
- Musical career
- Also known as: JubyPhonic
- Last updated: 23 November 2024
- Website: www.julietsimmons.com

Juliet Grace Simmons (born January 22, 1995), also known as JubyPhonic, is an American voice actress. She lends her voice in English dubs for Japanese anime series, films and video games. Her notable roles are Tenri Ayukawa in The World God Only Knows, Myucel Foaran in Outbreak Company, Jeanne Kaguya d'Arc in Nobunaga The Fool, Rei in Hamatora, Kurome in Akame ga Kill!, Kurumi Ebisuzawa in School-Live!, Goshenite in Land of the Lustrous, Shizuku Kurogane in Chivalry of a Failed Knight, Chiyo Sakura in Monthly Girls' Nozaki-kun and Kasumi Toyama in BanG Dream!.

== Career ==
Simmons created her YouTube channel with the name "JubyPhonic". She started off by singing covers of songs, most commonly Vocaloid and anime songs. She recorded covers, before becoming a voice actress. Simmons appeared in a podcast type livestream, and a tablet review.

== Dubbing roles ==
=== Anime ===
List of dubbing performances in anime
Year	Title	Role	Notes	Refs
2013	Shining Hearts: Shiawase no Pan	Princess Rufina		
2013–14	AKB0048 series	Sonata Shinonome		
2013	Campione!	Arianna Hayama Arialdi		
2013	Little Busters!	Sakiko, Itou	Credited as Additional Voices	
2013	Girls und Panzer	Aya Ono		
2013	Say I Love You	Momoko Sasano		
2014	Medaka Box Abnormal	Saki Sukinisaki		
2014	Maria Holic series	Chifumi Satsuki		
2014	Upotte!!	Ichihachi (AR18)		
2014	Problem Children Are Coming from Another World, Aren't They?	Ayesha		
2014	Mayo Chiki!	Sheep, Mecha Maid		
2014	Watamote	Kii, Megumi Imae		
2014–16	Fate/kaleid liner Prisma Illya series	Nanaki Moriyama		
2014	Tamako Market	Midori Tokiwa		
2014	Rozen Maiden Zuruckspulen	Tomoe Kashiawaba		
2015	Dog & Scissors	Madoka Harumi		
2015	Maid Sama!	Subaru, others		
2015	Muv-Luv Alternative	Lida Canales		
2015	Outbreak Company	Myucel Foaran		
2015	The World God Only Knows series	Tenri Ayukawa		
2015	Nobunaga the Fool	Jeanne Kaguya d'Arc		
2015	Magical Warfare	Hotaru Komagi		
2015–16	Akame ga Kill!	Kurome		
2015–16	Hamatora	Rei	also Re	
2016	Hanayamata	Yuka Komachi		
2016	Monthly Girls' Nozaki-kun	Chiyo Sakura		
2016	Cross Ange	Salamandine, Maki		
2016	Den-noh Coil	Mayumi	Episodes 24-25	
2016	My Love Story!!	Yukika Amami		
2017	Amagi Brilliant Park	Kobory		
2017	Is It Wrong to Try to Pick Up Girls in a Dungeon?	Syr Flover		
2017	Chivalry of a Failed Knight	Shizuku Kurogane		
2017	School-Live!	Kurumi Ebisuzawa		
2017	GATE	Tuka Luna Marceau		
2017	Monster Musume	Ren Kunanzuki	OVA	
2017	Food Wars!: Shokugeki no Soma	Mayumi Kurase		
2017	Chihayafuru	Kanade Ooe		
2017	Flying Witch	Chinatsu Kuramoto		
2018	UQ Holder!	Mizore Yukihiro		
2018	Hello Kitty and Friends – Let's Learn Together	Hello Kitty		
2018	Release the Spyce	Momo Minamoto		
2018	Takunomi	Michiru Amatsuki		
2019	Girls' Last Tour	Yuuri		
2019	Manaria Friends	Hanna		
2019	Kämpfer	Black Seppuku Rabbit		
2019	O Maidens in Your Savage Season	Momoko Sudo		
2020	BanG Dream!	Kasumi Toyama	Season 2	
2020	Shirobako	Misa Todō		
2020	Rifle Is Beautiful	Izumi Shibusawa		
2021	Mother of the Goddess' Dormitory	Sutea Koroya		
2022	Kakegurui ××	Inaho Yamato	Sentai Filmworks dub	
2022	Made in Abyss: The Golden City of the Scorching Sun	Meinya		
2022	Call of the Night	Young Akira		
2022	Ya Boy Kongming!	Eiko Tsukimi		
2023	Farming Life in Another World	Lecott		
2023	Oshi no Ko	MEM-cho		
2023	Management of a Novice Alchemist	Lorea		
2023	Love Flops	Ilya / Irina		
2023	Ragna Crimson	Ultimatia		
2024	Chained Soldier	Shushu		
2024	Jellyfish Can't Swim In The Night	Kano Yamanouchi		
2024	One Piece	Hera		
2025	Loner Life in Another World	Volleyball Girl		
2025	My Hero Academia: Vigilantes	Yu		
2025	Plus-Sized Elf	Honeda		
2025	Hero Without a Class: Who Even Needs Skills?!	Lilia		
2025	Dusk Beyond the End of the World	Tagitsu		

=== Films ===
List of dubbing performances in film
Year	Title	Role	Notes	Source
2015	Aura: Koga Maryuin's Last War	Ryoko Sato		
2016	Bodacious Space Pirates The Movie: Abyss in Hyperspace	Natalia Gennorth		
2017	Girls und Panzer der Film	Aya Ono		
2021	Gintama: The Very Final	Soyo Tokugawa		

=== Video games ===
List of dubbing performances in video games
Year	Title	Role	Notes	Source
2021	World's End Club	Mowchan		
