= Tamako Market =

Japanese anime television series

- たまこまーけっと; Tamako Māketto
- Genre: Comedy
- Created by: Kyoto Animation
- Developed by: Yukiko Horiguchi; Reiko Yoshida
- Written by: Reiko Yoshida; Jukki Hanada
- Directed by: Naoko Yamada
- Voices of: Aya Suzaki; Atsushi Tamaru; Takumi Yamazaki; Rina Hidaka; Yuki Kaneko; Juri Nagatsuma; Yuri Yamashita
- Music by: Tomoko Kataoka
- Opening theme: "Dramatic Market Ride" by Aya Suzaki
- Ending theme: "Neguse" by Aya Suzaki
- Country of origin: Japan
- Original language: Japanese
- No. of episodes: 12 (list of episodes)

Production
- Executive producer: Hideaki Hatta
- Producers: Riri Senami; Shinichi Nakamura
- Cinematography: Rin Yamamoto
- Animator: Kyoto Animation
- Editor: Kengo Shigemura
- Running time: 24 minutes
- Production companies: Kyoto Animation; Pony Canyon; Tokyo Broadcasting System; Usagiyama Shopping District

Original release
- Network: Tokyo MX, Sun TV, KBS, TV Aichi, BS11, Animax
- Release: January 10 – March 28, 2013

Related
- Tamako Love Story

Tamako Market (Note: Japanese: たまこまーけっと; Tamako Māketto) is a Japanese anime television series produced by Kyoto Animation, directed by Naoko Yamada, and written by Reiko Yoshida. Tamako Market centers on a young girl named Tamako Kitashirakawa, the daughter of a mochi shop owner located inside a shopping district in Kyoto's Kamigyo Ward as her life becomes complicated with friendships, rivalries and the arrival of a peculiar bird, named Dera Mochimazzi, from a nearby tropical island.

The series aired in Japan between January 10 and March 28, 2013. The anime has been licensed in North America by Sentai Filmworks and adapted into English. A film sequel, Tamako Love Story, premiered in Japan on April 26, 2014, paired with a short film titled Dera-chan of the Southern Islands. In 2023, Kyoto Animation announced a new project to celebrate the anime's 10th anniversary. The Tamako Market series and the Tamako Love Story movie were later screened in theaters in June 2023.

== Plot ==
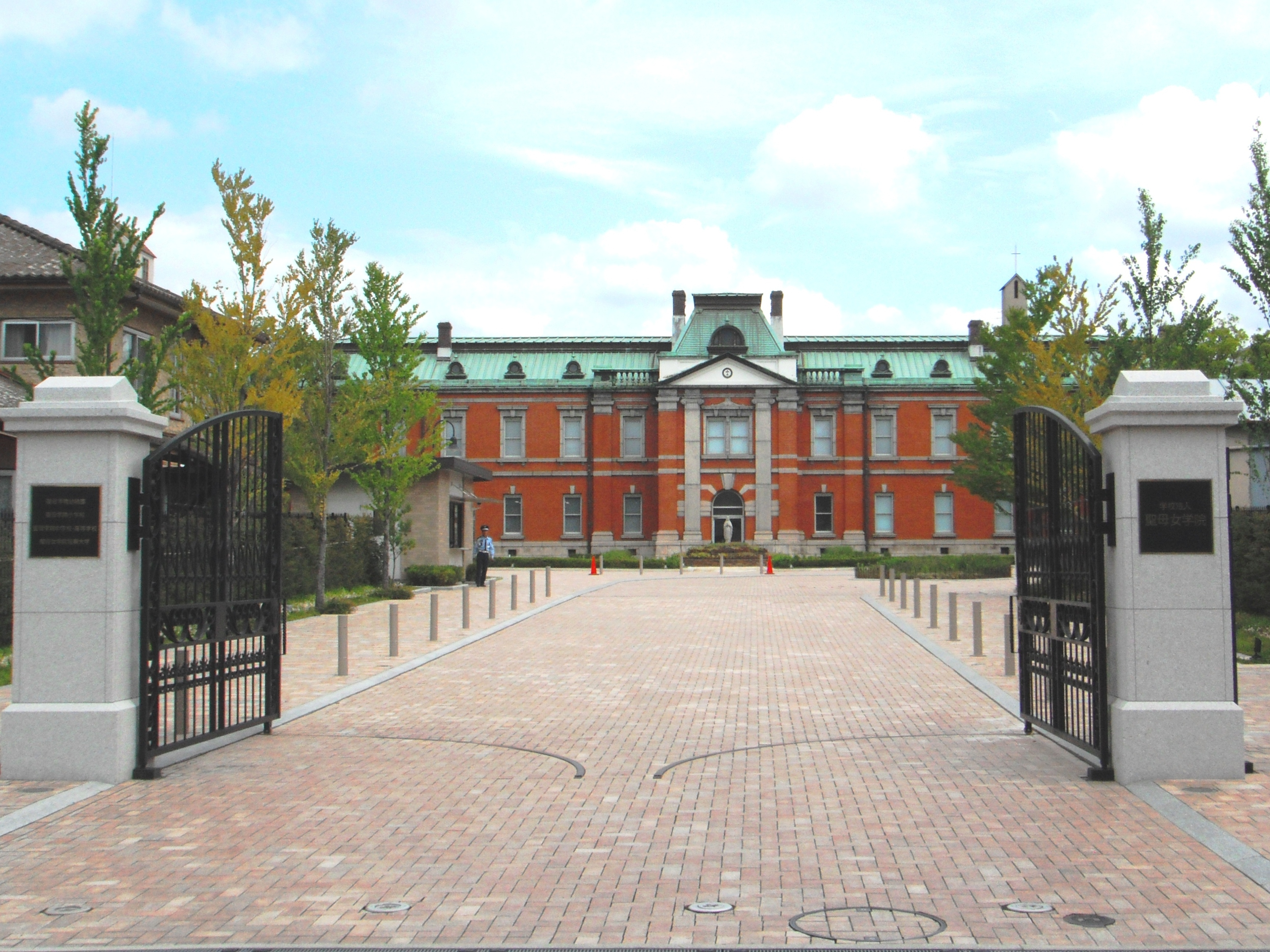
The former headquarters of the 16th Division of the Imperial Japanese Army in Fushimi, now operates as Kyoto Seibo Gakuin High School, used as a model for Usagiyama High School.

Tamako Kitashirakawa is the eldest daughter of a family which runs the Tama-ya mochi shop in the Usagiyama Shopping District (うさぎ山商店街, Usagiyama Shōtengai). One day, Tamako encounters a strange talking bird named Dera Mochimazzi who comes from a distant land searching for a wife for his country's prince. After becoming overweight from eating too much mochi, Dera ends up becoming a freeloader in Tamako's home.

The series follows the everyday life of Tamako, her friends, family and neighbors, and this peculiar bird. As well as keeping track to the main course of events, Tamako Market and the following Tamako Love Story film cover the emotional lives of the characters, particularly Tamako's childhood friend Mochizō's crush on her and both of them being too shy to open up to each other.

== Characters ==
=== Main characters ===
Tamako Kitashirakawa (北白川 たまこ, Kitashirakawa Tamako)
Voiced by: Aya Suzaki (Japanese); Margaret McDonald (English)
The title character and the main protagonist of the series, Tamako is a kind, cheerful and somewhat clumsy first-year in high school whose family runs a mochi shop in their town's shopping district called Tama-ya. She enjoys her high school life and the baton club with her friends Kanna and Midori. She helps her family run the shop and invent new kinds of mochi. Her birthday is on New Year's Eve and is often forgotten due to the busy schedule, but Tamako devotes herself to helping in the shop. Tamako is nervous about public speaking and has problems swimming in addition to being somehow clumsy. Tamako is shown to be rather slow in catching up with some things, particularly regarding people's feelings about love. She is one of the few characters that does not know Mochizō has a crush on her, and she fails to pick up on her sister's crush. Tamako feeds Dera mochi on a regular basis, and she feeds him too much for his size, making him bloated and unable to fly properly.
Mochizō Ōji (大路 もち蔵, Ōji Mochizō)
Voiced by: Atsushi Tamaru (Japanese); Clint Bickham (English)
Mochizō is Tamako's childhood friend whose family also runs a mochi shop called Ōji-ya or in the new name Ricecake Oh!Zee, a mochi shop located across from Tama-ya. Though their fathers are not on good terms due to business competition, he and Tamako are good friends. He is in love with Tamako, and has been in love with her for a few years. Since their bedroom windows face each other, Mochizo and Tamako often talk via a "cup and string" system that he made when they were kids. He is shown to be nervous with public speaking, despite telling Tamako to let him take over speaking in the shopping district meeting. His name comes from the fact that he was born on Mochi Day (October 10).
Dera Mochimazzi (デラ・モチマッヅィ)
Voiced by: Takumi Yamazaki (Japanese); Jay Hickman (English)
Dera is a bird that speaks Japanese, with a little bossy tone, that ends up staying at Tamako's house. He is a noble attendant for a royal court from a tropical island and was on journey to find a bride for its prince. However, after gaining an affinity for mochi, he has put on a lot of weight and thus cannot fly properly anymore, only being able to manage short distances before he runs out of breath. He is often just referred to as "Bird" (鳥, Tori) by Tamako's family, or simply "Dera-chan" (デラちゃん) by Tamako, as his surname sounds very similar to mochi mazui (もちまずい, lit. "bad tasting mochi"). Dera maintains that he is rather versed in the ways of love, sometimes giving Mochizō and Midori love advice on their respective crushes on Tamako. Dera is rather full of himself as well, which usually stems from a series of misunderstandings. He believes anyone that sneezes in his direction is in love with him, he himself having a crush on Shiori. His body contains a communication system used by the prince to communicate with him, although it only works when Dera is unconscious, thus he has no memories of any time the prince attempts to contact him. In his unconscious state, he can also be hooked up to video devices and used like a projector.
Dera makes a cameo appearance inside a claw crane in the 2018 film Love, Chunibyo & Other Delusions! Take on Me, set in the same universe as the anime series.
Midori Tokiwa (常盤 みどり, Tokiwa Midori)
Voiced by: Yūki Kaneko (Japanese); Juliet Simmons (English)
Midori is Tamako's classmate and childhood friend, as well as captain of her school's Baton Club, which Tamako and Kanna are also members of. Her grandparents own and run a toy shop in the town's shopping district called Tokiwa-do. Midori loves and cares about Tamako so much that she gradually begins to think more and more about the nature of her feelings as romantic love. This ambiguity only intensifies towards the end of the series, when the plot begins to imply her equality to Mochizo in terms of attachment to Tamako.
Kanna Makino (牧野 かんな, Makino Kanna)
Voiced by: Juri Nagatsuma (Japanese); Caitlynn French (English)
Kanna is a high school student in the same year as her friends, Tamako and Midori, and is a member of the baton club. She is the daughter of a carpenter who works in the same shopping district as Tamako and her family. A relaxed and laid back girl, Kanna does not care what anyone else thinks and is not easily swayed, however she does have a fear of heights and appears to have an allergy of birds. Kanna is often portrayed as rather eccentric, and usually wears a straight and expressionless face despite being fun and a good friend. Kanna is the only character who knows about Midori's potential feelings for Tamako, which she comments on with the words "everyone can love who they wants".
Shiori Asagiri (朝霧 史織, Asagiri Shiori)
Voiced by: Yurie Yamashita (Japanese); Krystal LaPorte (TV); Kira Vincent-Davis (Note: Credited as "Francis Caorotts".) (movie) (English)
Shiori is one of Tamako's classmates and a member of the badminton club. She is a knowledgeable and resourceful girl, with a serious, cool personality. However, it is shown that while she is quiet and often mistaken as distant, she is actually extremely shy and later becomes good friends with Tamako. Dera has fallen for her, though she does not reciprocate his feelings.

=== Kitashirakawa family ===
Anko Kitashirakawa (北白川 あんこ, Kitashirakawa Anko)
Voiced by: Rina Hidaka (Japanese); Brittney Karbowski (English)
Anko is Tamako's younger sister, who is in fourth grade. She is less practical than her older sister, and is a more fashion conscious girl. She often demands that she be called just "An", as she feels "Anko" is too childish. She is named after red bean paste.
Mamedai Kitashirakawa (北白川 豆大, Kitashirakawa Mamedai)
Voiced by: Keiji Fujiwara (Japanese); David Wald (English)
Mamedai is Tamako's father, who runs the family's mochi shop. He has a rivalry with Gohei Ōji, and they are often seen in front of their shops arguing, to which Tamako and Mochizō have to resolve. Tamako's father is a traditionalist, and does not care much for special mochi. He often mocks the sign of Gohei's shop, Ricecake Oh!Zee, commenting that it is ridiculous.
Fuku Kitashirakawa (北白川 福, Kitashirakawa Fuku)
Voiced by: Tomomichi Nishimura (Japanese); Carl Masterson (English)
Fuku is Mamedai's father and Tamako's grandfather, who lives with her family and helps run the mochi shop. He is rather laid back and lenient, especially towards Tamako and Anko, in contrast towards his son, who is much harsher on his two daughters. His and Mamedai's names together are a reference to mame daifuku.
Hinako Kitashirakawa (北白川 ひなこ, Kitashirakawa Hinako)
Voiced by: Yōko Hikasa (Japanese); Nancy Novotny (TV); Rozie Curtis (movie) (English)
Hinako is Mamedai's wife and Tamako and Anko's mother. She died when Tamako was in fifth grade.

=== Ōji family ===
Gohei Ōji (大路 吾平, Ōji Gohei)
Voiced by: Fumihiko Tachiki (Japanese); John Swasey (English)
Gohei is Mochizō's father, who runs the Ōji-ya shop. While Tamako's father sees Mochizō as a spy whenever he enters his shop, Gohei is on friendly terms with Tamako, as they both greet each other normally whenever they meet. Tamako does not think that his shop's name is ridiculous, and she praises his new sign above the shop when it is installed. Gohei is highly inventive with his mochi, taking advantage of non-Japanese holidays such as Valentine's Day in order to make different types of special mochi. This is one of the main arguments he has with Tamako's father.
Michiko Ōji (大路 道子, Ōji Michiko)
Voiced by: Satsuki Yukino (Japanese); Molly Searcy (English)
Michiko is Mochizō's mother, who helps run the Ōji-ya shop. She is fully aware of her son's crush on Tamako.

=== Usagiyama shopkeepers ===
Kaoru Hanase (花瀬 かおる, Hanase Kaoru)
Voiced by: Daisuke Ono (Japanese); Leraldo Anzaldua (English)
Kaoru is a florist at a flower shop in the Usagiyama Shopping District.
Kunio Yaobi (八百比 邦夫, Yaobi Kunio)
Voiced by: Kōji Tsujitani (Japanese); David Matranga (English)
The owner of the record store in the Usagiyama Shopping District, who has a habit of putting on fitting records at appropriate times. He was once in a band with Mamedai.
Chōji Yumoto (湯本 長治, Yumoto Chōji)
Voiced by: Kyosei Tsukui (Japanese); Christopher Ayres (English)
Chōji is Sayuri's father and the owner of the Usayu bathhouse in the Usagiyama Shopping District.
Sayuri Yumoto (湯本 さゆり, Yumoto Sayuri)
Voiced by: Junko Iwao (Japanese); Kasi Hallowell (English)
Sayuri is the daughter of Chōji. She helps out at the Usayu bathhouse in the Usagiyama Shopping District.
Tomio Shimizu (清水 富雄, Shimizu Tomio)
Voiced by: Yoshihisa Kawahara (Japanese); Greg Ayres (English)
Tomio is one of the market shop keepers in Usagiyama Shopping District, and runs the tofu shop there, Shimizuya. He has a crush on Sayuri.
Nobuhiko Tokiwa (常盤 信彦, Tokiwa Nobuhiko)
Voiced by: Hiroshi Yanaka (Japanese); John Kaiser (English)
Nobuhiko is Midori's grandfather and the owner of the toy shop Tokiwa-do in Usagiyama Shopping District.
Fumiko Mitsumura (満村 文子, Mitsumura Fumiko)
Voiced by: Kumiko Watanabe (Japanese); Tiffany Grant (English)
Fumiko runs a croquette shop Just Meat at Usagiyama Shopping District.
Tadanao Shiraki (白木 忠直, Shiraki Tadanao)
Voiced by: Naoya Nosaka (Japanese); Andrew Love (English)
Tadanao is the owner Miyako Udon, a ramen shop at Usagiyama Shopping District.
Takashi Uotani (魚谷 隆, Uotani Takashi)
Voiced by: Ken Narita (Japanese); Scott Fults (English)
Takashi is one of the shopkeepers at Usagiyama Shopping District. He and his wife, Mari, are the fishmongers of the Sashimi Shop, a fish shop.
Mari Uotani (魚谷 真理, Uotani Mari)
Voiced by: Yōko Hikasa (Japanese); Carli Mosier (English)
Mari is one of the members of Usagiyama Shopping District. She and her husband, Takashi, are the fishmongers of the Sashimi Shop, a fish shop.

=== Mochimazzi royal family ===
Choi Mochimazzi (チョイ・モチマッヅィ)
Voiced by: Yuri Yamaoka (Japanese); Allison Sumrall (English)
Choi is a fortune teller from the southern island that Dera comes from who is sent to check up on Dera and help him search for a bride for the Prince. She ends up staying with Tamako until Dera's communication function can be fixed. She assumes that Tamako is the Prince's bride due to a mark on her neck. It is hinted that she has feelings for the Prince. Despite this, she is very diligent in her search for the Prince's bride.
Mecha Mochimazzi (メチャ・モチマッヅィ)
Voiced by: Hiro Shimono (Japanese); Greg Ayres (English)
Mecha is a prince from the southern island that Dera comes from. He communicates through a projector that comes out of Dera's eyes, which usually goes unanswered as Dera's projections only work when he's unconscious, thus having no memory of the communications.

== Production ==
The Tamako Market anime television series is produced by Kyoto Animation and aired on Tokyo MX between January 10 and March 28, 2013. While the series consisted of the majority of staff from the K-On! anime, it is directed by Naoko Yamada and the script is written by Reiko Yoshida. The art director is Ikuko Tamine and the character designs are provided by Yukiko Horiguchi. The sound director is Yota Tsuruoka and the music is composed by Tomoko Kataoka. Bonus short episodes are included with the Blu-ray Disc and DVD volumes, which began release from March 20, 2013.

=== Film ===
A film sequel, titled Tamako Love Story (たまこラブストーリー), premiered in theatres in Japan on April 26, 2014, paired with a short film featuring Dera titled Dera-chan of the Southern Islands, directed by Tatsuya Ishihara. The feature film was produced by the same staff and featured the same cast as the television series. The film's opening theme is "Koi no Uta" (恋の歌) by Mamedai Kitashirakawa (Keiji Fujiwara). The film's ending theme is a different version of "Koi no Uta" sung by Aya Suzaki and the film's main theme song "Principle" (プリンシプル) is also by Suzaki. Unlike the anime series, which focuses on everyday life comedy, the film focuses more on romance and drama.

=== Music ===
The opening and ending themes respectively are "Dramatic Market Ride" (ドラマチックマーケットライド, Doramachikku Māketto Raido) and "Neguse" (ねぐせ; Bedhead), which are both performed by Aya Suzaki under her character name Tamako Kitashirakawa. Each theme songs received an individual album. The album for the opening theme, "Dramatic Market Ride", was released on January 25, 2013, while the album for its ending theme "Neguse" was released that very same day.

Dramatic Market Ride
No.	Title	Length
1.	"Dramatic Market Ride (ドラマチックマーケットライド)"	04:20
2.	"Light Up (ともろう)"	02:43
3.	"Dramatic Market Ride Instrumental"	04:19
4.	"Light Up Instrumental"	02:43
Total length:		14:03

Neguse
No.	Title	Length
1.	"Neguse (ねぐせ)"	03:52
2.	"Kimi no Mahō (キミの魔法)"	03:39
3.	"Neguse (Inst.)"	04:27
4.	"Kimi no Mahō (Inst.)"	03:47
Total length:		15:02

=== International release and distribution ===
The anime and the film has been licensed in North America by Sentai Filmworks and streamed on Hoopla and Anime Network Online with the latter being moved to Hidive in 2017. It is also streamed in the United Kingdom on Anime on Demand. Anime Limited acquired the series for distribution in the United Kingdom and Ireland. An English dub of the series debuted in November 2018. Anime Limited also acquired the film for release in the United Kingdom and Ireland. In Australia, the series was released by Hanabee on February 4, 2016. The series also aired in Animax in Asia.

A complete collection of the entire Tamako Market series and the film, Tamako Love Story was released via Section23 Films in North America on June 2, 2020, with Japanese and English audio, complete with textless credits.

== Other media ==
A light novel titled Tamako Market, written by Mutsuki Ichinose and illustrated by Yukiko Horiguchi, was published by Kyoto Animation on April 8, 2013.

== Reception ==
Carl Kimlinger of Anime News Network gave the anime an overall score of B, praising the light atmosphere and sense of fun while criticizing the characters for lacking enough depth to be memorable.

In a 2016 article written by Linda Lombardi of the Associated Press, fans visited Kamigyo Ward's Demachi Masugata Shotengai in which, locals go to the fishmonger, produce vendor or pharmacy, or eat at a neighborhood restaurant. After the series ended, fans still visited a fish shop there with a notebook left outside for visitors to sign.

== See also ==
- K-On!, the preceding TV series also directed by Naoko Yamada
- Kokoro Connect, an anime series with characters designed by Yukiko Horiguchi
