= Eri Sendai =

Japanese actress (born 1981)

- 仙台 エリ
- Born: October 30, 1981 (age 44); Tokyo, Japan
- Education: Tokai University
- Occupations: Actress; voice actress
- Years active: 1991–present
- Agent: Green Note (president)
- Height: 148 cm (4 ft 10 in)
- Children: 1
- Website: erinote.com

Eri Sendai (仙台 エリ, Sendai Eri; born October 30, 1981) is a Japanese actress and voice-actress from Tokyo. Her major roles in anime include Milk/Mimino Kurumi/Milky Rose in Yes! Precure 5, Saotome Rei in Yu-Gi-Oh! GX, Sa Kōrin in The Story of Saiunkoku, Morita Yukari in Rocket Girls, Shimbara Yuuhi in Neo Ranga, and Arika in Medabots.

== Career ==
She joined the Himawari Theatre Group in 1989. Later, she appeared in dramas and variety shows. Her debut as a voice actress came in 1997 in the OVA Jungle de Ikou!

For approximately 4 years from 2001, she worked with a theater company called Shanghai Jet and performed on stage. In 2002, Eri graduated from Tokai University Junior College (Takanawa campus). From 2004 until the end of May 2009, she was a member of the Tokyo Actor's Consumer's Cooperative Society. After freelancing, as of July of the same year, she joined Production Baobab. She became a freelance again on January 1, 2011, but later announced that she had joined Arkley (now Amuleto) on February 14, 2011. She returned to freelance on June 24, 2019.Subsequently, on July 27, 2020, she established Green Note, a voice acting agency where she serves as the representative.

She announced her marriage on her radio program, Eri Sendai's Natural Pancake, broadcast on October 29, 2014. On November 6, 2015, she reported on her blog that she had given birth to her first child, a girl.

== Filmography ==
=== Anime ===
Year	Title	Character	Note	Ref.
1998	Neo Ranga	Yuuhi Shimahara		
1999	Medabots	Arika		
2000	Medarot Damashii	Arika		
2002	Ghost in the Shell: Stand Alone Complex	Girl		
2003	Wolf's Rain	Leara		
2003	Gunslinger Girl	Triela		
2004	Futari wa Pretty Cure	Shiho Kubota		
2004	My-HiME	Kiyone Nonomiya		
2005	Rockman.EXE Stream	Maid B		
2005	Futari wa Pretty Cure Max Heart	Shiho Kubota		
2005	Best Student Council	Ayumu Oume		
2005	Happy Seven	Kuan Kitayama		
2005	Rockman.EXE Beast	Iris		
2005	Gunparade Orchestra	Mao Suzuki		
2006	Yomigaeru Sora -RESCUE WINGS-	Atsuko Hongou		
2006	xxxHOLiC	Ayaka		
2006	The Story of Saiunkoku	Kourin		
2006	Rockman.EXE Beast+	Iris		
2006	Sasami: Magical Girls Club	Chinako Tasai		
2006	Chocotto Sister	Young Haruma		
2006	Nighthead Genesis	Sakie Amamoto		
2006	Sasami: Magical Girls Club Season 2	Chinako Tasaki		
2007	Rocket Girls	Yukari Morita		
2007	Yes! Precure 5	Milk		
2007	Sisters of Wellber	Sherry		
2007	Bakugan Battle Brawlers	Runo Misaki		
2007	The Story of Saiunkoku Second Series	Kourin		
2007	Mushi-Uta	Shiika's Sister		
2007	Dragonaut: The Resonance	Nanami Hoshi		
2007	Yumedamaya Kidan	Ayako		
2008	Sisters of Wellber Zwei	Sherry		
2008	Shigofumi	Fumika Mikawa		
2008	Yes! Precure 5 GoGo!	Kurumi Mimino/Milky Rose/Milk		
2008	Top Secret: The Revelation	Michiru Sendo		
2009	Shugo Chara!! Doki—	Nemi		
2009	Kurokami The Animation	Makana		
2009	Chrome Shelled Regios	Mifi Lotten		
2009	Kupū~!! Mamegoma!	Kyoko/Samantha-chan		
2009	Miracle Train	Noriko		
2010	Bakugan Battle Brawlers: New Vestroia	Runo Misaki		
2010	Cat Planet Cuties	Aiko Ishimine		
2010	And Yet the Town Moves	Yukiko Arashiyama		
2011	Kamisama Dolls	Suō		
2011	Last Exile: Fam, The Silver Wing	Marianne		
2011	Future Diary	Tsubaki Kasugano		
2012	Love, Chunibyo & Other Delusions!	Toka Takanashi		
2012	Code:Breaker	Aoba Takatsu		
2012	Girls und Panzer	Caesar		
2013	Da Capo III	Mary Holmes		
2014	D-Frag!	Shinsen		
2014	Love, Chunibyo & Other Delusions! -Heart Throb-	Toka Takanashi		
2014	Lady Jewelpet	Lady Mizuki		
2014	Majin Bone	Saho		
2014	Daitoshokan no Hitsujikai	Kana Suzuki		
2017	Nora, Princess, and Stray Cat	Michi Kuroki		
2023	Power of Hope: PreCure Full Bloom	Kurumi Mimino		

=== OVA ===
- Carnival Phantasm: Hibichika Special - Chikagi Katsuragi
- Freedom - Chiyo
- Halo Legends - POM
- Jungle de Ikou! - Natsume/Mii
- Tekken: The Motion Picture - Young Jun

=== Films ===
- Jin Rō: The Wolf Brigade - Nanami Agawa
- King of Thorn - Shizuku Ishiki
- Yes! Precure 5: Kagami no Kuni no Miracle Daibōken! - Milk
- Yes! Precure 5 GoGo!: Okashi no Kuni no Happy Birthday! - Kurumi Mimino/Milky Rose/Milk
- Pretty Cure All Stars series (2009-2014) - Kurumi Mimino/Milky Rose/Milk
- Girls und Panzer der Film – Caesar, Yoshiko Akiyama
- Girls und Panzer das Finale: Part 1 – Caesar
- Love, Chunibyo & Other Delusions! Take on Me - Toka Takanashi
- Girls und Panzer das Finale: Part 2 – Caesar, Koume Akaboshi
- Girls und Panzer das Finale: Part 3 – Caesar, Koume Akaboshi

=== Video games ===
- Arcana Heart 2 - Angelia Avallone
- Arcana Heart 3 - Angelia Avallone
- Arknights - Toddifons
- Detective Conan: Tsuioku no Mirajiyu - Moe Kasuga
- Kamiwaza - Suzuna
- Ougon Musou Kyoku - Furfur
- Suikoden V - Lyon

=== Dubbing ===
- The Rebound – Sadie (Kelly Gould)
