= Love, Chunibyo & Other Delusions: Heart Throb =

2014 Japanese television season

- Season 2
- No. of episodes: 12

Release
- Original network: Tokyo MX, Sun TV, KBS, TV Aichi, Animax, BS11
- Original release: January 8 – March 26, 2014

Season chronology
- ← Previous; Season 1

Love, Chunibyo & Other Delusions is an anime television series based on Torako's light novel series of the same name and produced by Kyoto Animation. The second season of the series, Love, Chunibyo & Other Delusions: Heart Throb, aired in Japan from January 8 to March 26, 2014. It was simulcast by Crunchyroll. The first episode for a second set of Lite episodes was released on December 26, 2013, and the second series of shorts, Heated Table Series: Kotatsu, were released on March 19, 2014. The opening theme is "Voice" by Zaq and the ending theme is "Van!shment Th!s World" by Black Raison d'être. The ending theme for the Lite episodes is "Shin'en ni Mau Senritsu Shanikusai" (深淵に舞う戦慄謝肉祭, A Hair-Raising Carnival Dancing in the Abyss) by Zaq. Sentai Filmworks licensed the series in August 2015.

== Episodes ==
Story	Episode	Title	Original release date
1	1	"Evil Lord Shingan... Reborn"; Transliteration: "Fukkatsu no... Jaō Shingan" (Japanese: 復活の・・・邪王真眼)	January 8, 2014
Rikka Takanashi starts living with Yūta Togashi in preparation for their second year of high school, since the rest of his family has traveled to Jakarta. Makoto Isshiki sports blond spiky hair, but Kumin Tsuyuri is uninterested. Shinka Nibutani, who has temporarily dyed her brown hair black, continues to be at odds with Sanae Dekomori. After Nanase Tsukumo tells Yūta and Rikka that the latter received three undelivered letters, Yūta and Rikka attempt to look for a new place without avail. When Shinka, Kumin and Sanae examine the empty apartment, Tōka Takanashi suddenly finds them all and catches onto the act. After promptly defeating all five of them in a "battle", Tōka discusses with Yūta, Rikka, Shinka, Kumin, and Sanae about the current situation with Yūta and Rikka living together. Despite Tōka initially objecting to them living together, the issue is soon resolved when Kuzuha Togashi returns home for a new school semester and supervises them.
2	2	"Dolphin Ring Striker"; Transliteration: "Iruka no... Dorufin Ringu Sutoraikā" (Japanese: 海豚の・・・恋人契約 (ドルフィンリング・ストライカー))	January 15, 2014
Shinka, Sanae, and Kumin conclude that Yūta and Rikka are currently living together, spying on the couple throughout the day. Meanwhile, as Rikka struggles to do household chores, Yūta notices that Rikka has spent nearly all her monthly allowance on chūnibyō collectibles. After some trouble buying groceries, Yūta and Rikka go their separate ways for a while. In the clubroom, after Yūta reveals to Shinka that he has not yet held hands with Rikka, Shinka rushes to take Yūta in order to meet her friend Kazari Kannagi, who arranges for Yūta and Rikka to go on a date on Sunday. Yūta decides to take her to the aquarium, where they start holding hands. Rikka even participates in a dolphin show. As Rikka states her uncertainty over what lovers should do, Yūta decides that he is fine with their relationship staying the way it is for now. Later that night, Rikka meets a peculiar girl who had moved into her old apartment, climbing down the balcony in much the same way that Yūta first met her.
3	3	"Magical Devil Girl In Pursuit"; Transliteration: "Tsuigeki no… Maō Mahō Shōjo" (Japanese: 追撃の…魔王魔法少女)	January 22, 2014
Yūta is left reeling from a lewd dream about Rikka. After losing a bet against her by scoring slightly lower in a test, he wears a magical girl outfit in embarrassment. In the public announcement booth, Rikka encounters the peculiar girl from before named Satone Shichimiya, as they engage in "battle". When Yūta interrupts them, he informs Nanase that Satone is a childhood friend from middle school that caused his chūnibyō outbreak back then. While walking home, Yūta finally realizes that Satone lives in the apartment above his. When Rikka later arrives home, she is surprised that Satone is invited over for dinner, since Satone's parents will be late from work. Rikka becomes jealous when Satone expresses her clinginess towards Yūta, particularly when she habitually touches noses with Yūta. After seeing Satone off, Yūta reassures Rikka by initiating his "contract".
4	4	"The Election for President of the Student Council (Queen Maker)... of Purity"; Transliteration: "Mukunaru... Kuīn Mēkā" (Japanese: 無垢なる・・・ 生徒会長選挙 (クイーンメーカー))	January 29, 2014
Shinka plans to run for student council president. Due to Sanae's constant interference, Shinka urges Yūta to keep Sanae at bay, but Sanae escapes and pranks Shinka during her candid nomination speech in a classroom. Yūta, Rikka, Shinka, Kumin, and Sanae chance upon Satone, who reveals that she attended the same middle school as Shinka and knew her very well as Mori Summer. The next day, Sanae is convinced that Shinka is the genuine article, and starts acting more polite and affectionate towards her. In fact, Sanae assists Shinka with advertisements for her election campaign. When Shinka invites Sanae to her house, she prompts her to don her Mori Summer outfit. On the day of the election campaign, Shinka's reputation backfires, after Sanae reads the Mabinogion book during an endorsement speech with the image of Mori Summer on the projection screen. Shinka and Makoto become dropouts, and Sanae goes back to believing that Shinka is a fake, bringing their relationship back to the status quo.
5	5	"The Illusive... Siesta Labyrinth"; Transliteration: "Gensō no… Shiesuta Rabirinsu" (Japanese: 幻想の…昼寝迷宮(シエスタ・ラビリンス))	February 5, 2014
The student council determines which clubs will keep their clubrooms after school. Due to Rikka delegating a failed presentation of what the Far East Magical Napping Society Summer Thereof does exactly, this leads Nanase as the club advisor to investigate what the club actually uses the clubroom for. When Nanase points out that napping is actually a notable pastime, she suggests that the club participates in a "siesta match" against Maple Hill High School's Siesta Club to serve as an official club activity. Yūta and the girls meet Sui Nemuri from Maple Hill High School, sparking a rivalry with Kumin. Rikka haphazardly declares that she will disband her club if they lose the match. Thus, Kumin initiates a "napping boot camp" for the club at school, though this leads Yūta to come up with the idea of them staying up all night at his apartment to be naturally tired on the day of the siesta match, yet they oversleep anyway. Upon arrival at the siesta match, Kumin encourages the others to give it their all, despite their disadvantage. They end up winning the siesta match and saving the club.
6	6	"Travelling to the Island of Tsukushi... of Hesitation"; Transliteration: "Tamerai no... Tsukushino-shima Toraberingu" (Japanese: 躊躇（ためら）いの…筑紫島周遊（ツクシノシマ・トラベリング）)	February 12, 2014
It has been two months since the start of the second year of high school. Yūta, Rikka, Shinka, and Makoto go on a class trip by bus with the other second-year students to the island of Tsukushi, where Yūta and Rikka are notably shy about their relationship. Feeling Rikka cannot handle the romance aspect well, Yūta asks Shinka to watch Rikka. That night, the other female second-year students are aware that Shinka used to be Mori Summer, while the other male ones tease Yūta about Rikka. Soon after, Rikka sneaks into the boys' bedroom and hides in Yūta's bed, where they almost share a kiss, until Shinka gives them the opportunity to get Rikka out safely. Before returning to the girls' bedroom, Rikka kisses Yūta on the cheek. The next day, the two go sightseeing together.
7	7	"Triangle... of Missed Encounters"; Transliteration: "Surechigai no... Vorukēno Toraianguru" (Japanese: すれ違いの…心模様(ヴォルケーノ・トライアングル))	February 19, 2014
Yūta and Rikka come across Satone, who was separated from her own class trip after losing her purse. Before Yūta, Rikka, and Satone successfully retrieve it, Yūta and Satone are being chased by a wild monkey. When Rikka spots Yūta receiving an arcade token from Satone, she runs off feeling betrayed by Yūta and eventually coming across Shinka. As Yūta searches for Rikka, Satone calls Kuzuha, before calling Rikka to meet up with her at a pier. Satone explains that she once fell in love with Yūta, but discarded her feelings in order to hold onto her chūnibyō persona. This leaves Rikka to question whether she and Yūta intend to revive and keep their persona. As Satone leaves, Yūta reunites with Rikka, and gives her a new umbrella and charm necklace for her birthday.
8	8	"The False... Mori Summer [or Holy Spirit Mother]"; Transliteration: "Itsuwari no… Mori Samā" (Japanese: 偽りの…精霊聖母(モリサマー))	February 26, 2014
Having discovered a new website about Mori Summer, Sanae goes to a park and meets up with a girl named Natsumi Tokugawa, whom Sanae believes is the true Mori Summer. After Yūta, Rikka, Shinka, and Kumin observe some odd tendencies from a distance, Shinka confronts Natsumi but has nothing to prove herself as the real deal. As Shinka determines to use her real name, Sanae begins to feel lonely with Shinka avoiding her. Yūta and Kumin notice that Natsumi has a curious infatuation for Sanae. After Yūta suggests that Shinka should challenge Natsumi to a "battle", Rikka calls upon Satone to help train Shinka at the shrine. Back at the park, Natsumi tries to force herself onto Sanae, but Shinka recovers her persona and confronts Natsumi, before being overwhelmed. However, Sanae stands to protect Shinka, feeling that the genuine article would never do the things that the impostor has done. Once being defeated by Sanae, Natsumi sadly flees after learning that Sanae is having a relationship with Shinka.
9	9	"Resort - Last Resort"; Transliteration: "Namiuchigiwa no... Rizōto Rasuto Rizōto" (Japanese: 波打際の...究極奥義(リゾート・ラストリゾート))	March 5, 2014
Yūta finds another arcade token from an envelope similar to the first one Satone had. The next day, Kumin invites her friends to work at her aunt's seaside cafe "The Nap Room" at the beach. As Tōka arrives there, she introduces Cento, the daughter of her head chef in Italy. It turns out that Cento is good at swordsmanship, much to Rikka's surprise. That night, Yūta talks to Tōka about the ups and downs in his relationship with Rikka so far. Satone, noticed that Rikka is slowly losing her delusional powers, urges her to relinquish her feelings for Yūta in order to restore her persona. The next day, Sanae and Cento witness Rikka and Satone initiating a "battle". When Rikka recalls the special contract that she made with Yūta, this gives birth to her new delusional powers in order to win. Afterwards, Rikka stays determined to be with Yūta and retain her persona. On the way home, Satone laments over the possibility of being with Yūta and retaining her persona.
10	10	"Gauntlet of Rain [or] a Midsummer Night's... Rain and Whips"; Transliteration: "Manatsu no Yoru no... Gauntlet of rain" (Japanese: 真夏の夜の・・・雨と鞭 (Gauntlet of rain))	March 12, 2014
Satone finds herself overly thinking about Yūta, particularly when they spend a day at the water park. As Tōka and Cento prepare to leave for Italy, she tells Shinka, Kumin, and Sanae something shockingly important. The next day, Shinka, Kumin, and Sanae confront Satone, confirming that she is in love with Yūta. At the Bon Festival, Rikka wanders off alone, while Satone and Yūta take cover at the shrine during a rainy weather. Satone is forced to fight through her own heartbreak upon learning that Yūta and Rikka have already held hands and touched noses. Yūta receives a text from Rikka requesting backup, which he interprets as her needing an umbrella. Despite her best efforts, Satone cannot hold back in front of Yūta.
11	11	"Blue Moon Ragnarok"; Transliteration: "Aokitsuki no... Burūmūn Ragunaroku" (Japanese: 青き月の・・・最終決戦 (ブルームーン・ラグナロク))	March 19, 2014
Back at the apartment the following day, Yūta takes care of Rikka, who has caught a cold from the previous night. Rikka has been keeping the purpose of her outings a secret, much to Yūta's worry. Satone assures Yūta, Shinka, and Kumin that she has recovered from her heartbreak, yet Shinka reprimands Yūta for being so dense while Kumin states that Shinka wants the best for them. Shinka as Mori Summer appears to Satone and encourages her to challenge her other inner being. On the night of a blue moon, Satone prepares to challenge Yūta, but Kuzuha informs them that Rikka has left home. Remembering a letter that he wrote as a child about awakening the "Dark Flame Dragon", Yūta realizes that Rikka went off alone many times to fulfill these instructions. Yūta and Satone find Rikka near an overhead power line, where she finds a box containing an old orthopedic cast and the third arcade token, thus affirming their love through the contract. Satone battles the Dark Flame Dragon once it is awakened, overcoming her heartbreak and becoming renewed. Back at the apartment, Yūta notices that Satone has changed, as she happily leaves them.
12	12	"The Superior Contract... of Twilight"; Transliteration: "Koukun no... Haiyā Engēji" (Japanese: 黄昏の・・・ 上級契約(ハイヤーエンゲージ))	March 26, 2014
Kuzuha tells Yūta that their pet cat Chimera is under the weather. As the second term of the second year begins, Rikka seems to ignore Yūta in the classroom, which brings concern to Shinka, Sanae, and Kazari. In the park, Satone informs Shinka and Sanae that Rikka is thinking about entering a superior contract with Yūta, which means the kissing phase. At a public bathhouse, Rikka requests her friends to prevent her from running away from embarrassment, while Yūta discovers Makoto wearing a dark tan skin and accompanying a boy named Chihiro. While Shinka sends Yūta to meet Rikka at the bridge, Satone gives Rikka some encouragement. As Yūta arrives under the bridge, Rikka tries to get her feelings across, though still too scared to go through with it. Yūta assures her that they do not have to rush things, as she will always be the only one for him. Their kiss is interrupted, when Kuzuha informs Yūta that Chimera gave birth to six kittens.
13	13 (OVA)	"Playback of... the Wicked Eye's Apocalypse (The Rikka Wars)"; Transliteration: "Saisei no… The Rikka Wars" (Japanese: 再生の…邪王真眼黙示録（The Rikka Wars）)	September 17, 2014
Rikka becomes suspicious when Makoto allegedly gives Yūta a USB flash drive. After interrogation, Rikka, Shinka, Kumin, Sanae, and Nanase discover that the flash drive contains photos of a female pop star that Yūta had a crush on during middle school. A displeased Rikka instructs Yūta to return it, though Makoto secretly lets him keep it. That night, Rikka sneaks into Yūta's bedroom and inadvertently destroys the flash drive in her bedroom as she falls asleep while trying to hide it from him. This leads to the two of them arguing over who was in the wrong. As Shinka, Kumin, and Sanae later realize that neither Yūta nor Rikka are willing to apologize, the girls enlist the help of Satone using a hidden camera to see how Yūta reacts when Rikka does not come home for dinner. When the girls see that Yūta left a plate of food for Rikka later on, she goes to see him and the two eventually make up with each other.

=== Ren Lite episodes ===
Episode	Title	Original release date
1	"Kotatsu Head"; Transliteration: "Kotatsumuri" (Japanese: こたつむり)	December 26, 2013
In the clubroom, Shinka Nibutani attempts to wake up Kumin Tsuyuri from the kotatsu, but Kumin seems to be constantly moving in their sleep. Shinka discovers Rikka Takanashi and Sanae Dekomori hiding under the table, which Shinka removes.
2	"Stye, The Name of the Disease Which Infects the Eye"; Transliteration: "Monomorai, Mebachiko Arui wa Meibo to Iu Na no Yamai" (Japanese: ものもらい、めばちこ或いはめいぼと言う名の病)	January 15, 2014
Yūta Togashi tries to apply eye drops into Rikka's left eye, blinded and infected by a stye.
3	"Wicked Eye: Storm Chapter"; Transliteration: "Jaō Shingan Fūun-hen" (Japanese: 邪王真眼風雲編)	January 30, 2014
One day in junior high school, Tomo was roped into helping Rikka develop her apparent abilities. Rikka used Zener cards to test clairvoyance and determined the gender of who entered the classroom to test foresight, both with negative results.
4	"Dekomori vs. Nibutani 2"; Transliteration: "Dekomori VS Nibutani 2" (Japanese: 凸守 VS 丹生谷 2)	February 13, 2014
In the clubroom, Yūta, Kumin, and Makoto Isshiki watch Shinka and Sanae playing old maid. After ten minutes, the game reaches a climax, in which the last card is torn in half due to Sanae refusing to hand it over to Shinka, thus they both lose and continue to bicker on their way home on a rainy day.
5	"My Older Brother 3: Camping Chapter"; Transliteration: "Watashi no Onii-chan 3: Kyanpu-hen" (Japanese: 私のお兄ちゃん3 キャンプ編)	February 27, 2014
Kuzuha Togashi deals with Yūta during his chūnibyō persona during a camping trip. While finding water at a nearby stream, he saves her from chestnuts on the ground. The rest of the family later enjoys a meal of curry, but Kuzuha watches Yūta sitting by the campfire with a block of meat.
6	"Summoning an Archangel"; Transliteration: "Daitenshi Shōkan" (Japanese: 大天使召喚)	March 13, 2014
In the past, Shinka and Satone Shichimiya spent a day with their two friends attempting to summon an archangel via summoning circle. The paper vessel later gets blown in the sky by the wind. Back in the present day, Satone tells this story to Kumin in the clubroom, which embarrasses Shinka.

=== Heated Table Series: Kotatsu episodes ===
Episode	Title	Original release date
1	"Heated Table Series: Shiritori"; Transliteration: "Kotatsu de Shiritori" (Japanese: こたつ DE しりとり)	March 19, 2014
Rikka Takanashi, Shinka Nibutani, Kumin Tsuyuri, and Sanae Dekomori play a word game of word chains. Shinka repeatedly forces Rikka to come up with a phrase beginning with "shi".
2	"Heated Table Series: Bun Discussion"; Transliteration: "Kotatsu de Odango Dangi" (Japanese: こたつ DE ODANGO DANGI)	April 16, 2014
After Rikka, Shinka, and Kumin wonder what is inside Sanae's hair buns, Sanae reveals a pack full of candy inside one of her hair buns to the other girls, saying that the candy is a great use of attack compared to cookies.
3	"Heated Table Series: Dekomori's Wife"; Transliteration: "Kotatsu de Dekomori no Yome" (Japanese: こたつ DE 凸守の嫁)	May 21, 2014
After Rikka states that her relationship is rather normal, Sanae begins to talk about a worthy woman. It turns out that Sanae was describing her pet lizard named Níðhöggr, supposedly a dragon of death.
4	"Heated Table Series: Nabe Lecture"; Transliteration: "Kotatsu de Nabe Dangi" (Japanese: こたつ DE NABE DANGI)	June 18, 2014
Rikka, Shinka, Kumin, and Sanae, discuss their favorite flavors of hot pot, including chicken, marbled beef, medium steak, and snow crab. However, Shinka angers Sanae when mentioning a cheese fondue hot pot.
5	"All Times All Places on the Beach"; Transliteration: "Hamabe de Kokon Tōzai" (Japanese: 浜辺 DE 古今東西)	July 16, 2014
At the beach, Rikka, Shinka, Kumin, and Sanae play a second round of the game of word chains. Wanting to avenge her previous loss to Shinka, Rikka struggles in naming "cool fruits".
6	"Heated Table Series: A Wandering Chimera"; Transliteration: "Hōsō de Kimera" (Japanese: 放浪 DE きめら)	August 20, 2014
At the apartment, Rikka tries to figure out with Yūta and Kuzuha Togashi, as to why their pet cat Chimera has gained weight even after giving birth. They soon learn that Satone Shichimiya and Tōka have each been secretly feeding Chimera behind their backs.
7	"Supplementary Lessons in the Clubroom"; Transliteration: "Bushitsu de Hoshū" (Japanese: 部室 DE 補習)	September 17, 2014
After failing her English pop quiz, Rikka takes a supplementary lesson from Nanase Tsukumo in the clubroom, while Yūta, Shinka, Kumin, Sanae, and Makoto Isshiki take watch. Nanase even implements the use of "translating" the name of Rikka's umbrella, Schwarz Sechs Perfect Customize Guerzoniansus, into the supplementary lesson.
