= Leraldo Anzaldua =

American voice actor (born 1975)

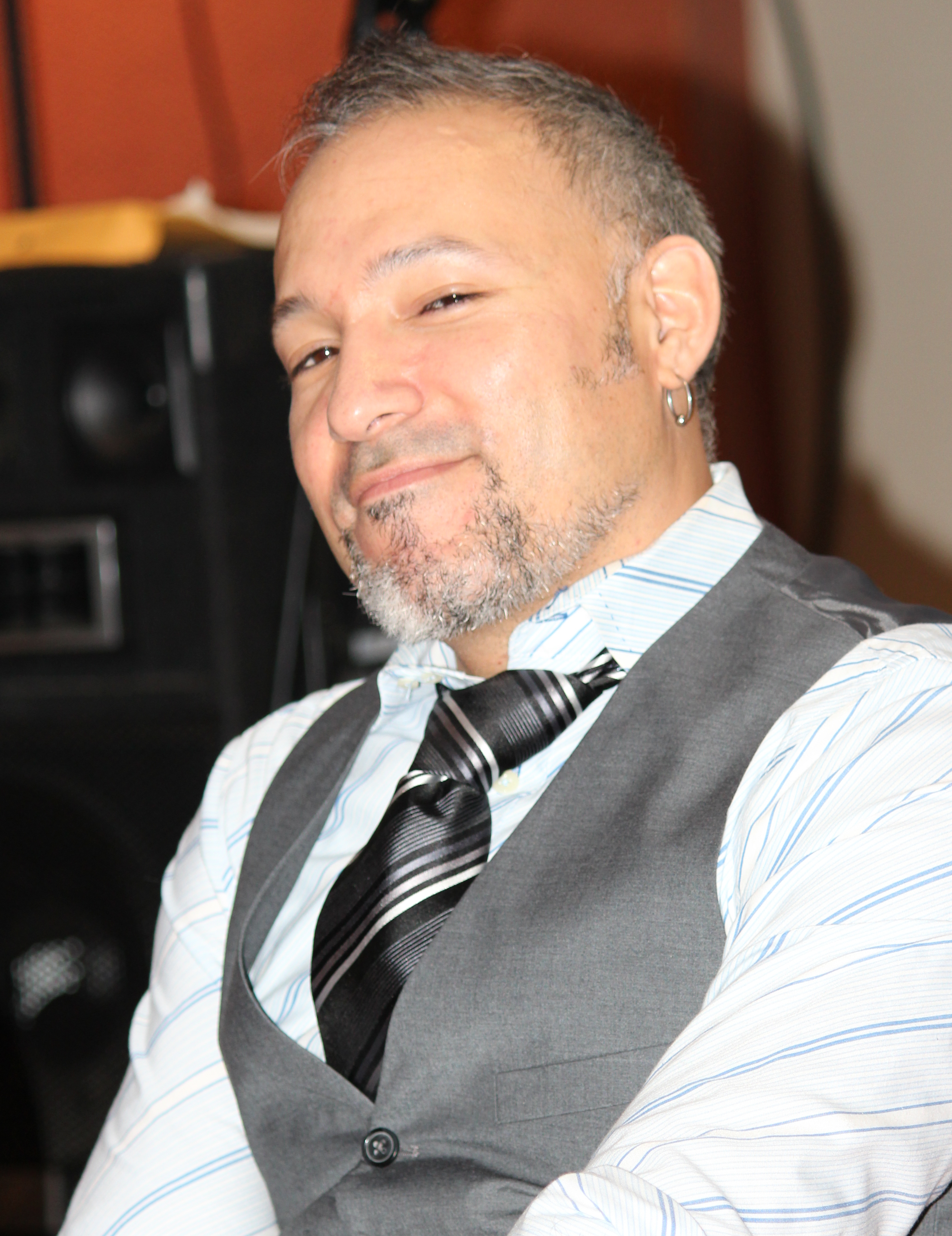
- Anzaldua at Animate Miami in 2013
- Born: June 22, 1975 (age 51); Houston, Texas, U.S.
- Education: University of Houston
- Occupations: Voice actor; ADR director; script writer; stunt coordinator

Leraldo Anzaldua (born June 22, 1975) is an American voice actor, ADR director, scriptwriter and stunt coordinator. He has an M.F.A. in acting from the University of Houston. In anime, he is known for providing the English voice of Yuta Togashi from the Chunibyo series, Ken Washio in Gatchaman, and Zed in Kiba.

== Filmography ==
=== Anime ===
| Year | Title | Role | Notes | Source |
|---|---|---|---|---|
| 2012 | Kids on the Slope | Additional Voices | | |
| 2013 | Btooom | Tsuneaki Ida | | |
| 2015 | Chaika - The Coffin Princess series | Toru Acura | also season 2 | |
| 2006 | Comic Party Revolution | Kazuki Sendo | | |
| 2015 | Chunibyo series | Yuta Togashi | also season 2 | |
| 2015 | Dog and Scissors | Macho | | |
| 2014 | Fate/Kaleid liner Prisma Illya series | Lord El-Melloi II (Waver Velvet) | also season 2 | |
| 2014 | From the New World | Rijin | | |
| 2014 | Gatchaman Crowds series | JJ Robinson | also season 2 | |
| 2011 | Guin Saga | Marius | | |
| 2017 | Haikyu!! | Kei Tsukishima | | |
| 2014 | Hakkenden: Eight Dogs of the East | Sosuke Inukawa | also season 2 | |
| 2012 | Hakuoki series | Hajime Saito | also season 2, movies | |
| 2015 | Hamatora | Art | also season 2 | |
| 2011 | Highschool of the Dead | Takashi Komuro | | |
| 2013 | Kamisama Dolls | Kyohei Kuga | | |
| 2008 | Kiba | Zed | | |
| 2013 | Little Busters series | Kengo Miyazawa | also season 2, EX | |
| 2015 | Magical Warfare | Tsuganashi Aiba | | |
| 2014 | Medaka Box Abnormal | Misogi Kumagawa | | |
| 2015 | Nobunaga the Fool | King Arthur | | |
| 2019 | O Maidens in Your Savage Season | Satoshi Sugimoto | | |
| 2013 | Say I love you | Yamato Kurosawa | | |
| 2005 | Science Ninja Team Gatchaman | Ken Washio | | |
| 2012 | Princess Resurrection | Ryu Ryu | | |
| 2014 | Tamako Market | Kaoru Hanase | | |
| 2014 | The Ambition of Nobuna Oda | Hanzo Hattori | | |
| 2014 | Watamote | Jun Ishimine | | |

=== Film ===
| Year | Title | Role | Notes | Source |
|---|---|---|---|---|
| 2012 | Children Who Chase Lost Voices | Shin | | |
| 2014 | Mardock Scramble: The Third Exhaust | Shell Septinos | | |
