= Azumi Asakura =

Japanese voice actress

- 浅倉 杏美
- Born: Azumi Yamamoto; February 15, 1987 (age 39); Kanagawa Prefecture, Japan
- Occupation: Voice actress
- Years active: 2003–present
- Agent: Arts Vision
- Height: 156 cm (5 ft 1 in)
- Children: 2

Azumi Yamamoto (山本 杏美, Yamamoto Azumi; born February 15, 1987), also known as Azumi Asakura (浅倉 杏美, Asakura Azumi), is a Japanese voice actress affiliated with Arts Vision.

== Biography ==
Asakura won the Columbia Award for the new audition of Voice Newtype and changed her last name from Yamamoto on September 1, 2006. It was announced at THE iDOLM@STER 5th Anniversary The World is all one !! held on July 4, 2010, and Asakura replaced Yurina Hase for the role of Yukiho Hagiwara. Asakura ended her Twitter account on October 28, 2014. On August 18, 2017, Asakura announced her marriage on their blog. She gave birth to her first child on November 1, 2019, and her second child on May 6, 2022.

== Filmography ==
=== Anime series ===
2005

- Mahou Sensei Negima – Akira Okouchi

2006

- Mamotte! Lollipop – Rokka Wan
- Negima! Magister Negi Magi – Akira Okochi
- The Story of Saiunkoku – Kinren

2007

- Kirarin Revolution – Tomo
- Bamboo Blade – Takahashi
- The Story of Saiunkoku Second Series – Kinren

2008

- Telepathy Shōjo Ran – Mifuyu, Yuki

2009

- Hanasakeru Seishōnen– Lin Li Fang

2011

- The Idolmaster – Yukiho Hagiwara
- Sket Dance – Fumi Segawa (ep 34, 42, 53)

2012

- High School DxD – Asia Argento
- Lagrange: The Flower of Rin-ne – Machiko Iwabuchi
- Love, Chunibyo & Other Delusions – Kumin Tsuyuri
- Shakugan no Shana Final – Leanan-Sidhe

2013

- A Certain Scientific Railgun S – Misaki Shokuhō
- The Devil Is a Part-Timer! – Emeralda Etūva
- High School DxD New – Asia Argento
- My Teen Romantic Comedy SNAFU – Meguri Shiromeguri

2014

- The Irregular at Magic High School – Keiko Kobayakawa
- Love, Chunibyo & Other Delusions -Heart Throb- – Kumin Tsuyuri
- Riddle Story of Devil – Isuke Inukai
- Strike the Blood – Octavia Meyer

2015

- Valkyrie Drive: Mermaid - Lady J
- High School DxD BorN – Asia Argento
- Fafner in the Azure: EXODUS – Saki Masaoka
- My Teen Romantic Comedy SNAFU TOO! – Meguri Shiromeguri / Keika Kawasaki
- Wakaba Girl – Otoha Kohashi

2016

- Ao no Kanata no Four Rhythm - Misaki Tobisawa
- Keijo - Hikari Muromachi
- Regalia: The Three Sacred Stars - Aoi Konoe

2017

- 18if – Mirei Saegusa
- Tales of Zestiria the X – Maoteras
- The Silver Guardian – Shostia
- UQ Holder! Mahou Sensei Negima! 2 – Akira Okouchi

2018

- High School DxD Hero – Asia Argento
- Kamisama Minarai: Himitsu no Cocotama – Awawa
- Devils' Line – Yuuko Tamaru

2019

- Pastel Memories – Child C

2020

- A Certain Scientific Railgun T – Misaki Shokuhō
- My Teen Romantic Comedy SNAFU Climax – Meguri Shiromeguri / Keika Kawasaki
- Princess Connect! Re:Dive – Kazemiya Akari

2021

- Seven Knights Revolution: Hero Successor – Goddess Ceras

2022

- The Devil Is a Part-Timer!! – Emeralda Etuva
- Princess_Connect!_Re:Dive Season 2 – Kazemiya Akari

2023

- The Devil Is a Part-Timer!! Season 2 – Emeralda Etuva

=== Anime films ===
- Takanashi Rikka Kai: Gekijō-ban Chūnibyō Demo Koi ga Shitai! (2013) - Kumin Tsuyuri
- Love, Chunibyo & Other Delusions! Take on Me (2018) - Kumin Tsuyuri

=== Original video animation ===
- Mahō Sensei Negima! : Spring/Summer (2006) – Akira Ōkōchi
- Suki Desu Suzuki-kun!! (2010) – Sayaka Hoshino
- Hime Gal Paradise (2011) – Himeko Tachikawa
- Asa Made Jugyou Chu! (2012) – Ayana Kakinozaka
- Rinne no Lagrange: Kamogawa Days (2012) – Machiko Iwabuchi

=== Original net animation ===
- Puchimas! Petit Idolm@ster (2013) – Yukiho Hagiwara and Yukipo

=== Video games ===
- Wand of Fortune (2009) – Martha
- Wand of Fortune ~Mirai e no Prologue~ (2010) – Martha
- Criminal Girls (2010) – Yuko
- The Idolmaster 2 (2011) – Yukiho Hagiwara
- Wand of Fortune 2 ~Jikuu ni Shizumu Mokushiroku~ (2012) – Martha
- Witch's Garden (2012) – Akari Hinomiya
- Hanairo Heptagram (2012) – Izuki Wakamura
- The Idolmaster Shiny Festa (2012) – Yukiho Hagiwara
- A Good Librarian Like a Good Shepherd (2013) – Sakuya Fumiya
- Chiisana Kanojo no Serenade (2013) – Shione Katagai
- Princess Connect! (2015) – Kazemiya Akari
- Ao no Kanata no Four Rhythm (2016) – Misaki Tobisawa
- Tales of Berseria (2016) – Laphicet
- Idol Death Game TV (2016) – Mariko Kamata
- Princess Connect! Re:Dive（2018）– Kazemiya Akari
- A Certain Magical Virtual-On (2018) – Misaki Shokuhō
- Granblue Fantasy (2018) – Fraux
- Azur Lane (2018) – U-47, U-557
- Girls' Frontline (2018) – S.A.T.8, Zas M21
- Arknights (2019) – Cardigan / Specter
- A Certain Magical Index: Imaginary Fest (2019) – Misaki Shokuhō
- The Idolmaster Poplinks (2021) – Yukiho Hagiwara
- The Idolmaster Starlit Season (2021) – Yukiho Hagiwara
- Eternal Tree (2021) – Kosenia
- Massage Freaks (2022) – Manamo Yukishiro
- Blue Archive (2023) – Misaki Shokuhō
- Reverse 1999 (2024) – Isolde

== Musical performances ==
Asakura participated in several albums and live concerts in connection with the role of Yukiho Hagiwara in THE iDOLM@STER franchise, replacing Yurina Hase in 2011.
