= Tadao Nagatsuma =

Tadao Nagatsuma from the Osaka University, Japan was named Fellow of the Institute of Electrical and Electronics Engineers (IEEE) in 2015 for contribution to millimeter and terahertzwave communications using photonics.
