= Juri Nagatsuma =

Japanese voice actress

- 長妻 樹里
- Born: October 27, 1988 (age 37); Hokkaido, Japan
- Other name: Ion Momoyama
- Occupations: Voice actress; singer
- Years active: 2010–present
- Agent: Raccoon Dog
- Height: 161 cm (5 ft 3 in)
- Musical career
- Genre: J-pop
- Instrument: Vocals
- Years active: 2014–present
- Label: ZERO-A
- Website: https://www.raccoon-dog.co.jp/talent/r08-nagatsuma.html

Juri Nagatsuma (長妻 樹里, Nagatsuma Juri; born October 27, 1988) is a Japanese voice actress and singer. She is affiliated with Raccoon Dog and signed to ZERO-A. For eroge works, she goes by the name Ion Momoyama (桃山 いおん, Momoyama Ion).

== Filmography ==
=== Anime series ===
- Maji de Watashi ni Koi Shinasai! (2011); Tsubame Matsunaga
- Fantasista Doll (2013); Puchitt, Yukage
- Leviathan The Last Defense (2013); Ainsel
- Silver Spoon (2013); Manami Sakae
- The Severing Crime Edge (2013); Kozakura Zenigata
- Tamako Market (2013); Kanna Makino
- Silver Spoon 2 (2014); Manami Sakae
- Love, Chunibyo and Other Delusions (2014); Satone Shichimiya
- Oneechan ga Kita (2014); Ichika Mizuhara
- Saki: The Nationals (2014); Shiromi Kosegawa
- Magimoji Rurumo (2014); Maaya Sawashita
- Yuki Yuna Is a Hero (2014); Karin Miyoshi
- Selector Spread WIXOSS (2014); Anne
- Gourmet Girl Graffiti (2015); Mei Tsuchida
- Tantei Kageki Milky Holmes TD (2015); Melodia
- My Wife is the Student Council President (2015); Sawatari
- The Asterisk War (2015); Priscilla Urzaiz
- Hybrid × Heart Magias Academy Ataraxia (2016); Hayuru Himekawa
- Seiren (2017); Toka Maruishi
- My Girlfriend Is Shobitch (2017); Saori Igarashi
- Yuki Yuna is a Hero: Hero Chapter (2017); Karin Miyoshi
- Miss Caretaker of Sunohara-sou (2018); Mea Uchifuji
- Circlet Princess (2019); Yūka Sasaki
- Wise Man's Grandchild (2019); Yuri Carlton
- Re:Stage! Dream Days♪ (2019); Nagisa Himura
- Fire in His Fingertips (2019); Ryo Rujihashi (complete version)
- Interspecies Reviewers (2020); Bi Bananan, Spirette
- Assault Lily Bouquet (2020); Shinobu Izue
- King's Raid: Successors of the Will (2020); Selene
- Dogeza: I Tried Asking While Kowtowing (2020); Urara Toyofusa, Rui Sukiyabashi
- Boruto (2020); Mia, Tsubaki Kurogane
- Yuki Yuna is a Hero: The Great Mankai Chapter (2021); Karin Miyoshi
- Princess Connect! Re:Dive Season 2 (2022); Kūka
- The Elusive Samurai (2024) as Hikari

=== Original video animation ===
- Koe de Oshigoto! (2010), Hazuki Nōge

=== Anime films ===
- Tamako Love Story (2014), Kanna Makino
- Love, Chunibyo & Other Delusions! Take on Me (2018), Satone Shichimiya

=== Video games ===
- Flowers series (2014–2017), Ichigo Sasaki, Ringo Sasaki
- Kemono Friends (2015), Dororo (Girl Type)
- Yuki Yuna is a Hero: Memory of the Forest (2015), Karin Miyoshi
- Alternative Girls (2017), Ren Agatsuma
- The Expression Amrilato (2017), Rin Takatō
- Yuki Yuna is a Hero: Hanayui no Kirameki (2017), Karin Miyoshi
- Princess Connect! Re:Dive (2018), Kūka Tomi
- Fire Emblem Three Houses (2019), Dorothea Arnault
- Itsuka no Memorajxo ~Kotonoha Amrilato~ (2019), Rin Takatō
- Azur Lane (2019), HMS Abercrombie; IJN Ryūhō
- Fire Emblem Heroes (2020), Dorothea and Young Merric
- Action Taimanin (2021), Asuka Koukawa
- Naraka: Bladepoint (2021), Kurumi
- Girls' Frontline: Project Neural Cloud (2022), Antonina, Banxsy
- Fire Emblem Warriors: Three Hopes (2022), Dorothea
- World II World (2022), Annette
