= Christina Kelly =

American voice actress (born 1991)

- Born: Christina Marie Kelly; November 13, 1991 (age 34); Newport Beach, California U.S.
- Education: University of Houston; Lady Bird Johnson High School
- Occupation: Voice actress
- Years active: 2015–present

Christina Marie Kelly (born November 13, 1991) is an American voice actress who provides voices for English dubs of anime series.

== Biography ==
Kelly was born in Newport Beach, California on November 13, 1991. She attended the University of Houston School of Theatre and Dance, where she has appeared in shows such as The Miser, Blood Wedding, Ring Round the Moon, and Zombie Prom: The Musical. She graduated with a BFA degree in acting in 2015.

In 2015, Kelly began voice acting with Sentai Filmworks while still attending the University of Houston. Her first lead role was Satone Shichimiya in the hit series Love, Chunibyo & Other Delusions -Heart Throb-. She had only been voice acting for four months when she landed the lead role of Mine in the action anime Akame ga Kill!, which would appear on Adult Swim's Toonami programming block. She was also the voice of Koko Kaga in the romantic-comedy, Golden Time. Her talent became noted by directors from Dallas, which led her to land the role of Yamato in Kancolle, a dub produced by Funimation.

Kelly has appeared on stage at Unity Theatre and The Catastrophic Theatre in Houston, Texas.

== Dubbing roles ==
=== Anime ===
Year	Work	Role	Notes	Reference
2015	Akame ga Kill!	Mine		
2015	Nobunaga the Fool	Kitsuno		
2015	Love, Chunibyo & Other Delusions -Heart Throb-	Saotone Shichimiya		
2015	Hamatora	Hajime		
2015	Black Bullet	Kisara Tendo		
2015	Brynhildr in the Darkness	Kitsuka Hatta		
2016	Log Horizon 2	Kawara		
2016	Cross Ange: Rondo of Angel and Dragon	Ersha		
2016	Girls und Panzer der Film	Pepperoni		
2016	My Love Story!!	Kojima		
2017	Land of the Lustrous	Padparadscha		
2017	Utawarerumono: The False Faces	Atuy		
2017	KanColle: Kantai Collection	Yamato		
2017	Himouto! Umaru-chan	Sylphynford Tachibana		
2017	Food Wars!: Shokugeki no Soma	Alice Nakiri		
2017	Flying Witch	Akane Kowata		
2018	UQ Holder! Magister Negi Magi! 2	Akira Okouchi, Zazie Rainyday	Sentai Filmworks dub	
2018	Real Girl	Iroha Igarashi		
2018	Revue Starlight	Claudine Saijo		
2018	Release the Spyce	Fū Sagami		
2019	Waiting in the Summer	Ichika Takatsuki		
2019	My Youth Romantic Comedy Is Wrong, As I Expected	Yumiko Miura	also Season 2	
2019	How Clumsy you are, Miss Ueno	Yomogi		
2019	Golden Time	Koko Kaga		
2020	Saint Seiya	Mermaid Thetis		
2020	BanG Dream!	Sāya Yamabuki	Season 2	
2020	Grisaia: Phantom Trigger	Thanatos		
2020	The Pet Girl of Sakurasou	Nanami Aoyama		
2020	The Demon Girl Next Door	Mikan Hinatsuki		
2020	Wasteful Days of High School Girls	Hisui "Majo" Kujyō		
2020	Shirobako	Kyōko Suzuki		
2020	Rifle Is Beautiful	Karen Sakashita		
2021	Bottom-tier Character Tomozaki	Minami "Mimimi" Nanami		
2021	Mother of the Goddess' Dormitory	Atena Saotome		
2021	Dropout Idol Fruit Tart	Hoho Kajino		
2021	Kakegurui	Mary Saotome	Sentai Filmworks dub	
2022	My Isekai Life	Slime		
2022	Chainsaw Man	Michiko Tendo		
2022	The Eminence in Shadow	Alpha		
2023	Akiba Maid War	Shiipon		
2023	Ningen Fushin: Adventurers Who Don't Believe in Humanity Will Save the World	Tiana		
2023	Oshi no Ko	Miyako		
2023	Farming Life in Another World	Lamulias		
2023	One Piece	Ulti		
2023	Phantom of the Idol	Kasenjiki		
2024	The Demon Sword Master of Excalibur Academy	Regina Mercedes		
2024	Suicide Squad Isekai	Enchantress / June Moone		
2025	Loner Life in Another World	Vice Rep B		
2025	Rock Is a Lady's Modesty	Alice Suzunomiya		
2026	Chained Soldier	Ren Yamashiro	Season 2	

=== Video games ===
Year	Work	Role	Notes	Reference
2021	Monark	Nozomi Hinata		
2024	Goddess of Victory: Nikke	Trina	Credited in-game	

== Awards and nominations ==
Year	Award	Category	Result
2015	4th Annual Behind the Voice Actors (BTVA) Anime Dub Awards	Breakthrough Voice Actress of the Year	Nominated
