= Chūnibyō =

Adolescents with delusions of grandeur

Chūnibyō (中二病; lit. 'middle-school second-year syndrome') is a Japanese colloquial term typically used to describe adolescents with delusions of grandeur. These teenagers are thought to desperately want to stand out and convince themselves that they have hidden knowledge or secret powers. It is sometimes called "eighth-grader syndrome" in the United States, usually in the context of localizations of anime which feature the concept as a significant plot element.

== History ==
The term was used by Japanese comedian Hikaru Ijūin in 1999, who described the effect as if it were an illness he had contracted. Ijūin made a statement disavowing the idea in 2009, as it had changed from a light-hearted remark to a condition that was studied seriously in psychology. In 2008, Hyōya Saegami wrote a book called Chūnibyō Toriatsukai Setsumei Sho (中二病取扱説明書), or "Chūnibyō User Manual", in which he identifies three types of chūnibyō: "DQN", who act like delinquents; "subculture", who go against the mainstream trends; and "evil eye", who aspire to have special powers.

== Legacy ==
Literary critic Bōshi Chino expressed that he would like to give the novel Don Quixote the subtitle "Chūnibyō Starting from 50 Years Old", from the vicious cycle observable within the work. This is characterized by "the protagonist's viewing of the world through colored glasses" causing "the people around him to play along in order to avoid denying his delusions, but in the end only causing the protagonist to succumb more and more to those delusions".

== See also ==
- Adolescence
- Adultism
- Anti-social behaviour
- Kinjirō Ashiwara
- Cognitive bias
- Don Quixote
- Fantasy-prone personality
- Hyperphantasia
- Indigo child
- Personal fable
- Peter Pan syndrome
- Schizotypal personality disorder
