= Yuki Yuna Is a Hero =

Japanese anime television series

- Promotional image featuring (left to right) Itsuki Inubozaki, Fu Inubozaki, Mimori Togo and Yuna Yuki.

結城友奈は勇者である (Yūki Yūna wa Yūsha de Aru)
- Genre: Dark fantasy; Magical girl
- Created by: Project 2H
Further information
Anime television series
| Directed by | Seiji Kishi |
| Written by | Makoto Uezu; Takahiro |
| Music by | Keiichi Okabe (Monaca) |
| Studio | Studio Gokumi |
| Licensed by | NA: Ponycan USA (former) Sentai Filmworks (current) |
| Original network | MBS, TBS, CBC, BS-TBS |
| Original run | October 17, 2014 – December 26, 2014 |
| Episodes | 12 |
Manga
Washio Sumi wa Yūsha Rajio; Washio Sumi wa Yūsha de Aru; Yūki Yūna wa Yūsha-bu Shozoku; Washio Sumi wa Yūsha de Aru ANOTHER STORY; Yūsha no Heya; Yūki Yūna wa Yūsha de Aru; Nogi Wakaba wa Yūsha de Aru; Yūsha GP; Washio Sumi wa Yūsha de Aru Gaiden Yūsha Koushinkyoku; Yūki Yūna wa Yūsha de Aru: Washio Sumi no Shō; Kusunoki Mebuki wa Tokkun-chu; Kusunoki Mebuki wa Tokkun-chu; Yūsha-bu Biyori; Shinmai Yūsha no Oshinagaki ～Nogi Wakaba wa Yūsha de Aru Supin Ato 4-koma～
Light novels
Washio Sumi wa Yūsha de Aru; Nogi Wakaba wa Yūsha de Aru; Kusunoki Mebuki wa Yūsha de Aru; Yūshashi Gaiten
Video game
| Developer | Minato Soft |
| Genre | Visual novel |
| Platform | Windows |
| Released | JP: December 17, 2014 |
Video game
Yūki Yūna wa Yūsha de Aru: Jukai no Kioku
| Developer | FuRyu |
| Genre | Action |
| Platform | PlayStation Vita |
| Released | JP: February 26, 2015 |
Video game
| Developer | Minato Soft |
| Genre | Visual novel |
| Platform | Windows |
| Released | JP: May 20, 2015 |
Anime film series
Yuki Yuna wa Yūsha-bu Shozoku
| Studio | W-Toon Studio |
| Released | March 18, 2017 (part 1); April 15, 2017 (part 2); July 8, 2017 (part 3) |
| Runtime | 48 minutes each |
Anime television series
Yuki Yuna Is a Hero: Washio Sumi Chapter
| Directed by | Seiji Kishi (chief director); Daisei Fukuoka |
| Written by | Makoto Uezu |
| Music by | Keiichi Okabe (Monaca) |
| Studio | Studio Gokumi |
| Licensed by | Amazon Prime Video (former): NA: Sentai Filmworks (current) |
| Original network | MBS, TBS, CBC, BS-TBS, AT-X |
| Original run | October 7, 2017 – November 18, 2017; Theatrical screening March 18, 2017 (part 1); April 15, 2017 (part 2); July 8, 2017 (part 3) |
| Episodes | 7 |
Anime television series
Yuki Yuna Is a Hero: Hero Chapter
| Directed by | Seiji Kishi (chief director); Daisei Fukuoka |
| Written by | Makoto Uezu; Takahiro |
| Music by | Keiichi Okabe (Monaca) |
| Studio | Studio Gokumi |
| Licensed by | Amazon Prime Video (former): NA: Sentai Filmworks (current) |
| Original network | MBS, TBS, CBC, BS-TBS, AT-X |
| Original run | November 25, 2017 – January 6, 2018 |
| Episodes | 6 |
Anime television series
Yuki Yuna Is a Hero: Churutto!
| Directed by | Seiya Miyajima |
| Written by | Haruka |
| Music by | Monaca |
| Studio | DMM.futureworks; W-Toon Studio |
| Licensed by | NA: Sentai Filmworks |
| Original network | MBS, TBS, AT-X |
| Original run | April 10, 2021 – June 26, 2021 |
| Episodes | 12 |
Anime television series
Yuki Yuna Is a Hero: The Great Mankai Chapter
| Directed by | Seiji Kishi |
| Written by | Makoto Uezu |
| Music by | Keiichi Okabe (Monaca) |
| Studio | Studio Gokumi |
| Licensed by | NA: Sentai Filmworks |
| Original network | MBS, TBS, BS-TBS, AT-X |
| Original run | October 2, 2021 – December 18, 2021 |
| Episodes | 12 |
- icon

Yuki Yuna Is a Hero (結城友奈は勇者である, Yūki Yūna wa Yūsha de Aru) is a Japanese magical girl anime television series created by Takahiro, produced by Studio Gokumi and directed by Seiji Kishi as part of a media project called Takahiro IV Project. The series aired in Japan between October 17 and December 26, 2014, on MBS. The anime has been licensed by Pony Canyon's North American label Ponycan USA. Multiple light novel and manga series have been published by ASCII Media Works. A PlayStation Vita video game was released in Japan in February 2015. A visual novel for Windows was released in December 2014 with the first DVD and Blu-ray Disc volume for the anime, with a second released with the sixth volume in May 2015. A second anime season project, consisting of an adaptation of a prequel light novel and a sequel series, ran between March 2017 and January 2018. A smartphone game launched in 2017 and received a short anime series titled Yuki Yuna Is a Hero: Churutto!, which aired between April and June 2021. A third anime season aired between October and December 2021.

== Plot ==
The story takes place on the Japanese island Shikoku in the fictional city of Sanshu, based on the real-life city of Kan'onji in Kagawa Prefecture, in the 300th year of the Era of the Gods (神世紀, Shinseiki). Yūna, Mimori, Fū, and Itsuki are all members of the Sanshu Middle School Hero Club (讃州中学勇者部, Sanshū Chūgaku Yūsha-bu), dedicating themselves to helping those in need. One day in their regular daily lives, the Hero Club members are suddenly caught in an explosion of light and transported to a strange forest, where they encounter mysterious monsters known as Vertex which seek to destroy the Shinju (神樹; "Divine Tree"), the guardian deity which protects and blesses humanity. Using a special phone application granted by Taisha, an organization dedicated to the Shinju, Yuna and her friends must transform into "heroes" with magical powers to protect their world from imminent destruction.

== Characters ==
=== Sanshu Middle School Hero Club ===
Yuna Yuki (結城 友奈, Yūki Yūna)
Voiced by: Haruka Terui (Japanese); Xanthe Huynh (English)
A second-year in middle school and member of the Hero Club. She prides herself on being a hero, helping out others in need and always remaining optimistic. She uses armored fists for powerful close-range combat during her hero form and has a cow-like familiar named Gyūki (牛鬼) who, unlike the other familiars, likes to roam freely; she later gets another, cat-like familiar named Kasha (火車). As a result of using her Mankai form, she loses her sense of taste. Later, she uses the Mankai form for a second time and loses the use of her legs. Having fallen into a coma due to her efforts, she regains consciousness after Mimori's voice reaches her, as actually her soul was out of her body in a black hole-like realm. She soon recovers and regains her sense of taste and the ability to walk.
Mimori Togo (東郷 美森, Tōgō Mimori) / Sumi Washio (鷲尾 須美, Washio Sumi)
Voiced by: Suzuko Mimori (Japanese); Erika Harlacher (English)
Yūna's best friend and fellow classmate and club member who lives next door to her and often prefers to be called by her family name. Mimori takes pride in her national heritage and is always ready to defend her country and protect its people. She had lost the use of her legs, along with some of her memories, allegedly due to a car accident. In her hero form, she uses guns and sniping rifles for long-range combat and her ribbons serve as appendages for moving around. She also has three familiars, Gyōbudanuki (刑部狸), Aobōzu (青坊主), and Shiranui (不知火). Later, she gets another familiar named Kawabataru (川蛍). As a result of using her Mankai form, she loses her hearing in her left ear. Like the rest of her Hero Club friends, she recovers after the events of the final episode and regains her memory and the ability to walk.
Prior to the events of the series, she was adopted under the name of Sumi Washio and fought alongside her elementary school classmates Sonoko and Gin. She originally used a bow and arrow in her hero form but later upgraded to a silver rifle. The loss of her legs and memory were actually a result of her using Mankai twice, after which she was returned to her original family and relocated next to Yūna due to her high affinity. Upon meeting Sonoko again, she learns both the truth about the Hero System and the true nature of Shinju.
Fu Inubozaki (犬吠埼 風, Inubōzaki Fū)
Voiced by: Yumi Uchiyama (Japanese); Erica Mendez (English)
A third-year in middle school and the president of the Hero Club. She is the older sister of Itsuki, who she has been looking after following the death of their parents. She is knowledgeable about Shinju and the Vertex and was the one who gave her fellow members the app needed to fight against the Vertex. She uses a large sword in her hero form and her familiar is Inugami (犬神). Later she gets another familiar named Kamaitachi (鎌鼬). As a result of using her Mankai form, she loses vision in her left eye, but regains it back after the events of the final episode. It is also revealed that her parents were killed by Vertex, and as such her original motivation for fighting Vertex was for revenge. Details about the exact situation of her parents' death were not given.
Itsuki Inubozaki (犬吠埼 樹, Inubōzaki Itsuki)
Voiced by: Tomoyo Kurosawa (Japanese); Brianna Knickerbocker (English)
A first-year in middle school and member of the Hero Club. She is Fū's younger sister and respects her dearly. She uses vines to attack her enemies in her hero form and her familiar is Kodama (木霊). Later, she gets another familiar named Ungaikyō (雲外鏡). As a result of using her Mankai form, she loses her voice, but regains it after the events of the final episode.
Karin Miyoshi (三好 夏凛, Miyoshi Karin)
Voiced by: Juri Nagatsuma (Japanese); Sarah Anne Williams (English)
An experienced, but somewhat stubborn hero who transfers into Yūna and Mimori's class and joins the Hero Club to supervise the other heroes. She uses a pair of katanas in her hero form and her familiar is Yoshiteru (義輝; voiced by: Kaneta Kimotsuki). In episode 11, as a result of using Mankai four times, she loses the use of her right arm, right leg, her hearing and vision, but later regains them after the events of the final episode.
Sonoko Nogi (乃木 園子, Nogi Sonoko)
Voiced by: Kana Hanazawa (Japanese); Christine Marie Cabanos (English)
Mimori's classmate during elementary school who first appears in Washio Sumi wa Yūsha de Aru and uses a large trident in her hero form. She nicknamed Mimori "Wasshī". As a result of using Mankai twenty times, she loses the use of most of her limbs and becomes unable to move, and afterwards is put in direct supervision of Taisha as a trump card. She later appears in the anime series, where she informs Yūna and Mimori about the truth behind the Hero System. After the events of the final episode, she is shown to have regained her lost body functions and later joins the Hero Club.

=== Other heroes ===
Gin Minowa (三ノ輪 銀, Minowa Gin)
Voiced by: Yumiri Hanamori
Mimori and Sonoko's classmate during elementary school who appears in Washio Sumi is a Hero and uses a pair of large blades in her hero form. She dies protecting Mimori and Sonoko, prompting Taisha to change the Hero System, implementing fairies and Mankai. Her terminal is eventually passed onto Karin.

Wakaba Nogi (乃木 若葉, Nogi Wakaba)
Voiced by: Ayaka Ōhashi
Sonoko's predecessor and one of the first heroes chosen to fight against the Vertex, who fought using a one handed katana named Ikutachi (生大刀).
Tamako Doi (土居 球子, Doi Tamako)
Voiced by: Kaede Hondo
One of the first heroes who fought alongside Wakaba using a shield. She was killed attempting to protect Anzu from the Vertex.
Anzu Iyojima (伊予島 杏, Iyojima Anzu)
Voiced by: Reina Kondō
One of the first heroes who fought alongside Wakaba using a crossbow. She, alongside Tamako, was killed by the Vertex.
Chikage Kori (郡 千景, Kōri Chikage)
Voiced by: Aina Suzuki
One of the first heroes who fought alongside Wakaba, using a scythe and cloning magic. Overcome with stress from public backlash against the heroes and her feelings for Yuna, she was stripped of her powers as a result of attempting to kill Wakaba, leading to her being killed by Vertex and officially disregarded as a hero by Taisha.
Yuna Takashima (高嶋 友奈, Takashima Yūna)
Voiced by: Haruka Terui
One of the first heroes who fought alongside Wakaba with her fists, possessing unknown ties to the present Yuna Yuki.
Hinata Uesato (上里 ひなた, Uesato Hinata)
Voiced by: Marika Kōno
Wakaba's childhood friend and an oracle working for Taisha who received visions of the future.

=== Exo-barrier Special Investigations Fleet ===
Mebuki Kusunoki (楠 芽吹, Kusunoki Mebuki)
Voiced by: Minami Tanaka
A hero candidate who lost to Karin and instead became a member of the ESIF.
Aya Kokudo (国土 亜耶, Kokudo Aya)
Voiced by: Yūko Ōno
Suzune Kagajou (加賀城 雀, Kagajō Suzune)
Voiced by: Atsumi Tanezaki
Yumiko Miroku (弥勒 夕海子, Miroku Yumiko)
Voiced by: Naomi Ōzora
Shizuku Yamabushi (山伏 しずく, Yamabushi Shizuku)
Voiced by: Shizuka Ishigami

== Media ==
=== Print ===
A prequel light novel titled Washio Sumi wa Yūsha de Aru (鷲尾須美は勇者である; lit. Washio Sumi is a Hero), written by Takahiro and illustrated by Bunbun, was serialized in ASCII Media Works' Dengeki G's Magazine between April 30, 2014 and November 29, 2014. The novel takes place two years before the anime's time frame, and follows the previous Hero team before Yūna's. Another light novel series, titled Nogi Wakaba wa Yūsha de Aru (乃木若葉は勇者である; lit. Nogi Wakaba is a Hero), written by Aoi Akashiro and illustrated by Bunbun, began serialization in Dengeki G's Magazine on July 30, 2015. Nogi Wakaba takes place 300 years before the anime's time frame during the first Vertex attack on the world. It follows Sonoko Nogi's ancestor, Wakaba Nogi as its protagonist and the first Shikoku hero team consisting of her, Hinata Uesato, Yūna Takashima, Chikage Kōri, Tamako Doi and Anzu Iyojima. Another light novel written by Akashiro, Kusunoki Mebuki wa Yūsha de Aru, began serialization in Dengeki G's Magazine on June 30, 2017. It takes place after the anime's first season and before Hero Chapter, and follows a different team of Heroes.

A manga adaptation of Washio Sumi wa Yūsha de Aru, illustrated by Mottsun*, began serialization in ASCII Media Works' Dengeki G's Comic from June 30, 2014. A manga titled Yūki Yūna wa Yūsha-bu Shozoku (結城友奈は勇者部所属; lit. Yūki Yūna is a Hero Club Member), written by Takahiro and illustrated by Kotamaru, began serialization in Dengeki G's Magazine from July 30, 2014. The first volume of a third manga, titled Yūki Yūna wa Yūsha de Aru and illustrated by Tōko Kanno, was released on November 27, 2014. Yūki Yūna wa Yūsha de Aru later started serialization in Dengeki G's Comic on December 26, 2014.

=== Anime ===
The first 12-episode anime television series was produced by Studio Gokumi and directed by Seiji Kishi. Planned by Takahiro, the anime's screenplay was written by Makoto Uezu, and the character design was provided by Takahiro Sakai. The series aired in Japan on MBS from October 17 to December 26, 2014, and was simulcast by Crunchyroll. The opening theme is "Hoshi to Hana" (ホシトハナ, Star and Flower) and the ending theme is "Aurora Days"; both are performed by Sanshū Chūgaku Yūsha-bu (Haruka Terui, Suzuko Mimori, Yumi Uchiyama, Tomoyo Kurosawa, and Juri Nagatsuma). The ending theme for episode four (acoustic version) and episode nine is "Inori no Uta" (祈りの歌, Song of Prayer) by Tomoyo Kurosawa. The anime was licensed in North America by Pony Canyon's label for the region, Ponycan USA, which released the series with an English dub on DVD and Blu-ray on April 10, 2015.

A second anime season was released in 2017 and consists of two parts; The Washio Sumi Chapter (鷲尾須美の章, Washio Sumi no Shō), an adaptation of the Washio Sumi is a Hero light novels, and Hero Chapter (勇者の章, Yūsha no Shō), which takes place after the first season. The Washio Sumi Chapter was first released as three theatrical films between March 18 and July 8, 2017, before airing as six television episodes between October 7 and November 11, 2017, followed by a recap of the first season which aired on November 18, 2017. Hero Chapter, which consists of six television episodes, aired between November 25, 2017, and January 6, 2018. Both parts were simulcast in North America by Anime Strike. Three short films produced by W-Toon Studio, based on the spin-off manga, Yūki Yūna wa Yūsha-bu Shozoku, were screened alongside each The Washio Sumi Chapter film.

A short anime based on the Yūki Yūna wa Yūsha de Aru Hanayui no Kirameki smartphone game, titled Yuki Yuna Is a Hero: Churutto!, was announced on May 26, 2020. The series is directed by Seiya Miyajima at DMM.futureworks and W-Toon Studio. Miyajima is designing the characters, while Haruka is overseeing the scripts, and Monaca is composing the series' music. It aired from April 10 to June 26, 2021, on the Super Animeism block on MBS and TBS.

A third anime season titled The Great Mankai Chapter (大満開の章, Dai-Mankai no Shō) was announced, with the main staff and cast members reprising their roles. It consists of adaptations of the Kusunoki Mebuki wa Yūsha de Aru and Nogi Wakaba wa Yūsha de Aru light novels, followed by an expanded retelling of the ending of Hero Chapter with new scenes and a new epilogue. It aired from October 2 to December 18, 2021, on MBS, TBS, and their affiliates. The opening theme is "Ashita no Hanatachi" (アシタノハナタチ, "Tomorrow's Flowers"), while the ending theme is "Chiheisen no Mukō e" (地平線の向こうへ, "Beyond the Horizon"), both performed by Sanshū Chūgaku Yūsha-bu.

=== Video games ===
Two visual novels for Windows, developed by Minato Soft and featuring scenarios written by Takahiro and Osamu Murata, are bundled with the first and sixth DVD and Blu-ray Disc volumes of the anime series released on December 17, 2014, and May 20, 2015, respectively. Each visual novel features ten different scenarios original to the game and is fully voiced by the original cast. The graphics are handled by Studio Gokumi. An action video game developed by FuRyu titled Yūki Yūna wa Yūsha de Aru: Jukai no Kioku (結城友奈は勇者である 樹海の記憶; lit. Yūna Yūki is a Hero: Memories of the Tree Sea) was released on February 26, 2015, for the PlayStation Vita.

A crossover mobile game titled Yuuki Yuuna is a Hero: Bouquet of Brilliance (結城友奈は勇者である 花結いのきらめき, Yūki Yūna wa Yūsha de Aru: Hanayui no Kirameki), or YuYuYui for short, was released on June 8, 2017, for iOS and Android. It featured characters, including those from manga and light novels, alongside new characters in the mobile game. It also included various non-canon stories, such as stories of Yuki Yuna, Washio Sumi, Nogi Wakaba, Kusunoki Mebuki, Fuyo Yuna, Akamine Yuna; collaborations with Release the Spyce: Secret Fragrance, Katana Maidens: Toji No Miko, one of Studio Gokumi's shows, A Certain Scientific Railgun T and Symphogear. The game ended service on iOS and Android devices on October 28, 2022.

On October 8, 2022, Entergram announced that Bouquet of Brilliance was in the process of being ported to consoles.

== Reception ==
The first Japanese Blu-ray volume opened as the week's eight best selling animation Blu-ray, with 4,781 copies, and remained on the sales charts for an additional four weeks, selling 10,373 copies in total. Each volume of the series has charted highly on Oricon list. Volume five charted at No. 1 on sales list, with 6,422 copies, whereas the sixth and final volume placed second, with 7,626 copies. Yuki Yuna Is a Hero was the 15th-best selling animation BD in Japan of 2015's half yearly sales list, having earned 58,961 copies in total.

The first film ranked No. 1 on the mini-theater rankings in Japan. The second film also ranked No. 1 on the mini-theater rankings when it was released, outselling the first film.
