= Yukari Anzai =

Japanese voice actress

- 安齋 由香里
- Born: December 31; Taiwan
- Other names: Yukari-chan; Zai-chan
- Occupation: Voice actress
- Years active: 2017–present
- Agent: Sigma Seven
- Notable work: Release the Spyce as Momo Minamoto; Lapis Re:Lights as Tiara
- Height: 160 cm (5 ft 3 in)

Yukari Anzai (安齋 由香里, Anzai Yukari; born December 31) is a Taiwanese–Japanese voice actress. She was affiliated with the agency Swallow and turned into freelancer in November 2022, before joining Sigma Seven on February 1, 2024. She made her voice acting debut in 2017, playing her first major role as Momo Minamoto in the anime series Release the Spyce in 2018.

== Biography and career ==
Anzai spent part of her childhood in Taiwan. She grew up watching anime series like Cardcaptor Sakura and Super Doll Licca-chan, as well as being exposed to the Zoids franchise through her brother. She took an interest in voice acting while in elementary school when, as part of a class presentation, she had a part in a historical play. So she could familiarize herself with the voice acting profession, her brother loaned her a DVD of the series Magical Girl Lyrical Nanoha A's, and she was influenced by the acting and singing of voice actress Nana Mizuki. Watching the series motivated Anzai to pursue a voice acting career. To hone skills, she also listened to roles voiced by Sanae Kobayashi, Aoi Yūki, and Kana Hanazawa. She also spent eight months studying abroad in New Zealand.

Anzai debuted in 2017 after graduating from Pony Canyon's P's Voice Artist School. She started out playing minor roles in the anime series Clean Freak! Aoyama kun, Angel's 3Piece!, and Love and Lies. The following year, she was cast in her first major role, as Momo Minamoto, the protagonist of the anime series Release the Spyce. She, along with the series's other major characters, also performed the show's opening ("Supatto! Spy & Spice" (スパッと！スパイ&スパイス, Supatto! Supai ando Supaisu)) and ending ("Hide & Seek") theme songs under the group-name Tsukikage. While promoting Release the Spyce, she appeared at C3 AFA Jakarta 2018, the last to be held in Indonesia. In October 2018, as part of promotions for the Onsen Musume multimedia franchise, she was named a Japanese ambassador for the hot springs of Hsinchu County, Taiwan. That same year, she was cast as Tiara in the mixed-media project Lapis Re:Lights. In 2019, she played the role of Miharu Yomine in the mobile game Cue!, which she reprised in its anime adaptation.

== Filmography ==
=== Anime ===
2017

- Clean Freak! Aoyama kun as Reona Baba, Furukawa, Schoolgirl, Girl
- Angel's 3Piece! as Isurugi, Elementary Schoolgirl
- Love and Lies as Schoolgirl

2018

- Ultra Monsters Anthropomorphic Project as Woman
- Duel Masters as Breaking Dance Churis, Eyeball Doctor, Hakase Toyama
- Magical Girl Site as Yuka Sumikura
- Layton Mystery Tanteisha: Katori no Nazotoki File as Customer A
- Happy Sugar Life as Minori Kitaumekawa
- Release the Spyce as Momo Minamoto

2019

- The Quintessential Quintuplets as Announcement, Eba
- Rinshi!! Ekoda-chan as Customer A
- Hitori Bocchi no Marumaru Seikatsu as Junior High Schoolgirl B

2020

- Lapis Re:Lights as Tiara

2021

- Fairy Ranmaru as Schoolgirl 1, Fan 1, Idol A, Boys

2022

- Cue! as Miharu Yomine

2023

- Ippon Again! as Sanae Takigawa
- The Iceblade Sorcerer Shall Rule the World as Tiana Algren
- The Dreaming Boy Is a Realist as Yuyu Inatomi

2024

- Rinkai! as Chigiri Toyohashi

2025

- There's No Freaking Way I'll be Your Lover! Unless... as Ajisai Sena

2026

- Daemons of the Shadow Realm as Azami
- Tetsuryō! Meet with Tetsudō Musume as Arisa Nishiura

2027

- Multi-Mind Mayhem as Seillune
- Maiden Blood as Epica

TBA

- Promise Me the Spotlight as Hatsune Fukuba

=== Video games ===
2018

- Lapis Re:Lights as Tiara
- Onsen Musume as Neiwan Jianshih

2019

- Cue! as Miharu Yomine
- Magia Record as Temari Kira

2021

- The Idolmaster Cinderella Girls as Kotoka Saionji
