= Kimi ga Aruji de Shitsuji ga Ore de =

Japanese adult visual novel & its adaptations

君が主で執事が俺で
- Genre: Comedy, harem
- Video game
- Developer: Minato Soft
- Publisher: Minato Soft
- Genre: Eroge, Visual novel
- Platform: Windows, PlayStation 2, PlayStation Portable
- Released: May 25, 2007 (Windows); March 27, 2008 (PS2); November 29, 2009 (PSP)
- Novel series
- Written by: Haruka Fuse
- Published by: Paradigm
- Original run: September 19, 2007 – present
- Volumes: 3
- Novel series
- Written by: Fūichirō Noyama
- Published by: GoodsTrain
- Original run: September 25, 2007 – present
- Volumes: 2
- Manga
- Written by: Hamao Kō
- Illustrated by: Sanbō Shironeko
- Published by: Kadokawa Shoten
- Magazine: Comp Ace
- Original run: October 26, 2007 – April 25, 2009
- Volumes: 1
- Anime television series
- Directed by: Susumu Kudo
- Written by: Takahiro
- Music by: Elements Garden: Noriyasu Agematsu; Hitoshi Fujima
- Studio: A.C.G.T
- Original network: TV Kanagawa, Tokyo MX, Chiba TV, TV Saitama, Animax
- Original run: January 4, 2008 – March 29, 2008
- Episodes: 13

Kimi ga Aruji de Shitsuji ga Ore de (君が主で執事が俺で; lit. You Are the Master and the Servant Is Me), often abbreviated "Kimiaru" (きみある), and also known as They Are My Noble Masters, is a Japanese adult visual novel developed by Minato Soft and released on May 25, 2007, for Windows on DVD. A PlayStation 2 version with adult-content removed was released under the title Kimi ga Aruji de Shitsuji ga Ore de: Otsukae Nikki on March 27, 2008. Two separate novel versions have been written, the first by Haruka Fuse, and the second by Fūichirō Noyama. A manga version started serialization in Kadokawa Shoten's magazine Comp Ace on October 26, 2007, written by Hamao Kō, and illustrated by Sanbō Shironeko. An anime adaptation aired in Japan from January to March 2008 on TV Kanagawa. A set of three drama CDs have been produced, along with a radio drama CD.

== Plot ==
Due to family troubles, Ren Uesugi and his sister, Mihato, leave their home. They end up moving to the city but find themselves with a lack of money. Somehow they are able to find work in the form of the Kuonji family's mansion, being employed as servants to the three sisters of the Kuonji family: Shinra, Miyu, and Yume. Being a servant also associates Ren with the mansion's additional servants and the Kuonji sisters' friends.

== Characters ==
Ren Uesugi (上杉 錬, Uesugi Ren)
Voiced by: Tomokazu Seki
Ren was hired by the Kuonji family after running away from home with his older half-sister, Mihato. Known for his stubbornness and unwillingness to admit defeat, he also has a slight older sister complex towards Mihato. The siblings ran away when he could no longer tolerate the beatings their father gave him. Although he works all around the mansion, Ren's primary responsibility is serving as Shinra's personal butler because she loves to tease him for his honest and straightforward personality. As the story progresses, Ren develops feelings for Shinra Kuonji. Ren is called Ren-chan by his sister whom he calls Hato-nee.

Shinra Kuonji (久遠寺 森羅, Kuonji Shinra)
Voiced by: Shizuka Itō (credited in PC as Rina Misaki)
Eldest sister of the Kuonji siblings, she has a habit of teasing the people she likes and a fondness for cute things particularly Ren and her own sister, Miyu. Her favorite animal is a panda because she finds how they are black and white "cute". Despite her relatively young age she has made a name for herself as a famous orchestral conductor. On hiring Ren and Mihato, Shinra tells them not to refer to Miyu with honorifics.

Venis (朱子, Benisu)
Voiced by: Hyo-sei (credited in PC as Erena Kaibara)
Venis is the Kuonji head maid and Shinra's personal attendant. She has a violent short temper. Her name has a similar phonetic sound to "penis" when said in Japanese. This is shown to greatly aggravate her when the Uesugi siblings make fun of it. Venis grew up in a poor section of an unnamed European city, working at a relative's restaurant while learning to cook, learning to fight while protecting herself from those who would try to grab her, and teaching herself math in the streets. After the restaurant closed, she was picked up off the streets by the Colonel, who was impressed by her skill in cooking and brought her to work at the Kuonji house. She values Shinra's praise and attention above all else because she feels that Shinra gives her a reason to live. She initially clashes with Ren, who refers to her as Benikō (ベニ公) in order to prevent himself from laughing at her name. However when the two are kidnapped and Ren purposely aggravates their kidnappers to divert their attention from her, she begins to see him in a new light.

Miyu Kuonji (久遠寺 未有, Kuonji Miyu)
Voiced by: Yūko Gotō (credited in PC as Shino Kujō)
Second oldest of the Kuonji and referred to as a "loli" by Shinra due to her short and childish appearance. Despite her size and figure, she is actually in her twenties. She constantly protests against being treated as child and molested by Shinra, but she gives in when the treatment has a small plus side to it (candy, presents, games, hugs, etc.) Miyu is a shotacon though she also seems attracted to Ren as well. She is also the smartest of the sisters, already having graduated from college. Miyu claims to have an I.Q. of 240 and earns millions by selling her patented inventions, thus she has a lot of free time to idle around. She created De Niro, an egg shaped robot. Miyu was the first of the Kuonji sisters whom Ren meets when Miyu passes out in the street.

Mihato Uesugi (上杉 美鳩, Uesugi Mihato)
Voiced by: Hitomi (credited in PC as Minami Hokuto)
Ren's older half sister who ran away with him. She occasionally needs glasses, is known to hide items in forty-nine different places on her body and has admitted to having a "Brother Complex". After she and Ren become part of the servant staff, she shows signs of being lonely without him near her, even though they are in the same building. She is sometimes jealous that Ren pays attention to girls other than her and thinks of ways of removing the person who is drawing his attention away from her, but is usually stopped before anything happens (played for comedic effect in the anime). She works as Miyu's personal maid. Ren calls Mihato Hato-nee and she refers to him as Ren-chan.

Yume Kuonji (久遠寺 夢, Kuonji Yume)
Voiced by: Asuka Minamori (credited in PC as Sora Amano)
The youngest of the Kuonji siblings and probably the most stereotypically average one among them as far as personality and personal problems go. Referring to herself with her own name (a typically childish trait), Yume is usually overlooked by her sisters. Only Natose and Ren pay her any serious attention. She is envious of Shinra's fondness of Miyu. Her hobbies include repairing radio antennas, reading manga, writing silly imaginative stories and collecting seashells. Her most noticeable feature is her shockingly pink hair.

Natose (南斗星)
Voiced by: Yū Asakawa (credited in PC as Misaki Kamishiro)
Natose is Yume's personal attendant and also the head of security for Kuonji mansion. She has blue hair and wears an eyepatch over her right eye. When in battle she takes a Muay Thai stance. She has a great love for food and is shown to have superhuman abilities when it comes to obtaining it. She grew up on an island together with a younger sister and brother, however she lost her family and her right eye in a tsunami. Ren astutely observes that she has always wished to have a younger sibling and thus calls her "big sis". Her name means "Southern Star" and she is depicted as almost dog-like (abundant energy, fetching the paper by leaping ridiculously high in the air, a love for meat products, a vicious fighter when her master is in need of her, incredibly loyal, but relatively easy to fool or distract, etc.)

Colonel (大佐, Taisa)
Voiced by: Yōsuke Akimoto (credited in PC as Zenshu Iwao)
The head butler, who used to be in the special forces, and whose name is Taijiri Yasushi. He believes himself to be incredibly handsome. In the anime, he frequently parodies other anime series, most notoriously Mobile Fighter G Gundam, as part of an in-joke referring to the fact that his and Ren's voice actors played major roles in that series. While very hard on Ren by pushing him to the limit in his butler training, he is in reality an honorable man and believes in Ren. The colonel's entire body is covered in scars from the time he spent in the special forces however they are usually covered by his butler uniform.

De Niro (デニーロ, De Nīro)
Voiced by: Kazuya Tatekabe (credited as in PC as Ichibu Kachidoki)
Miyu's invention who serves as her attendant. An egg shaped robot with a mouth, not radio controlled but an advanced A.I that gives him free will and thoughts and also a bullying attitude. He likes to molest electronic appliances and sing karaoke, however his voice is designed as a powerful weapon which can cause serious brain damage to people. He also utilizes several other tools and weapons throughout the series including a drill and some form of a rocket system, however, it is unclear exactly with how many he has been equipped or of what they are capable.

Chiharu Kiyohara (清原 千春, Kiyohara Chiharu)
Voiced by: Yū Amamiya (credited in PC as Kū Iida)
Although he is male, Chiharu looks and sounds feminine. He is in charge of cleaning the Kuonji household. As a nod to his less important role in the story, he is often being overlooked and forgotten by everybody. He grows to have a crush on Venis (which Ren, Yume or Natose could not believe) because she constantly looks out for him, but desists when she tells him that she may be attracted to Ren. Despite knowing that Chiharu is male Ren is still uneasy about him and refuses to shower together with him.

Ageha Kuki (九鬼 揚羽, Kuki Ageha)
Voiced by: Rie Tanaka
A rich girl who is Yume's classmate. She has a butler of her own named Kojūrō whom she often hits regardless of whether he has completed or failed a task. She comes to have feelings for Ren after seeing his honest, hardworking personality and takes his first kiss (it was also her first kiss). The cross-shaped scar on her forehead is explained in the PlayStation 2 version (according to the Colonel). She enjoys kelp tea. In the anime, Ageha rewards people other than Kojūrō by giving them food. An older Ageha Kuki appears as a character in Maji de Watashi ni Koi Shinasai! alongside her brother.

Kojūrō Takeda (武田 小十郎, Takeda Kojūrō)
Voiced by: Nobuyuki Hiyama (credited in PC as Toraji Tatsuta)
Kojūrō is Ageha's butler. He does not mind being hit by her; in fact, he finds great displeasure in receiving any other form of punishment (or praise). While strong and hardworking, he tends to be a blockhead.

Keiko Inamura (稲村 圭子, Inamura Keiko)
Voiced by: Natsuko Tauchi (credited in PC as Arika Kusugami)
Keiko is another classmate of Yume's and is nicknamed "Kei".

Anastasia Mistina (アナスタシア·ミスティーナ, Anasutashia Misutīna)
Voiced by: Mahiro Chiaki (credited in PC as Shingyo Mezume)
Yet another one of Yume's classmates and nicknamed "Mi". Anastasia has an extreme affection for pain.

Isao Uesugi (上杉 巌, Uesugi Isao)
Voiced by: Keiji Fujiwara (credited in PC as Akira Kota)
Isao is Ren and Mihato's father, who was abusive towards Ren during his childhood. It was revealed that Ren's mother died giving birth to him, thus he hated Ren but at the same time felt an obligation to take care of Ren in honor of his late wife. He confronts Ren after finding out where he ran away to and, after Ren stands up to him, they come to an understanding.

Michael Plushenko (ミハエル·プルシェンコ, Mihaeru Purushenko)
Voiced by: Keiji Fujiwara
Michael is Shinra's mentor in conducting.

Banshō Kuonji (久遠寺 万象, Kuonji Banshō)
Banshō is father of the Kuonji siblings and was a great philanthropist.

Kuman (クマーン, Kumān)
Voiced by: Rikiya Koyama

== Media ==
=== Visual novel ===
The visual novel was produced by the company Minato Soft first released as an adult game on May 25, 2007, for the PC as a DVD. A version for the PlayStation 2 with adult-content removed, was produced by Minato Soft's sister company Minato Station and released on March 27, 2008, under the title Kimi ga Aruji de Shitsuji ga Ore de: Otsukae Nikki (君が主で執事が俺で 〜お仕え日記〜).

=== Novels ===
There have been two novel adaptations based on the series. The first, written by Haruka Fuse, is published by Paradigm. The first novel was released on September 19, 2007, and two novels have been published as of November 20, 2007. A third volume will follow on January 25, 2008. The second novel series, written by Fūichirō Noyama, is published by GoodsTrain under their TwinTail Novels label. The first novel was released on September 25, 2007, and two novels will have been published as of December 25, 2007.

=== Manga ===
A manga adaptation written by Hamao Kō and illustrated by Sanbō Shironeko began serialization in Kadokawa Shoten's video game and manga magazine Comp Ace on October 26, 2007. The first tankōbon volume was released on March 26, 2008, and contained five chapters.

=== Anime ===
An anime adaptation directed by Susumu Kudo (who also developed the story for the original game), written by Takahiro, and produced by animation studio A.C.G.T aired in Japan between January 6 and March 29, 2008, on TV Kanagawa, containing thirteen episodes. The opening theme is "Hizamazuku Made 5 Byo Dake!" by Miyuki Hashimoto, and the ending theme is "Butler Switch On!" (Butler スイッチ オーン!) by Yuko Goto.

==== Episodes ====
No.	Title	Original release date
1	"You Are the Master, the Servant is Me"; Transliteration: "Kimi ga Aruji de Shitsuji ga Ore de" (Japanese: 君が主で執事が俺で)	January 6, 2008
Ren and Mihato arrive in the city and are unable to find work. They meet Miyu who is about to collapse from anemia and help get home to her family's mansion. From there Ren and Mihato (through some odd circumstances) acquire jobs as servants to the Kuonji family, but they must first pass a one-week trial period.
2	"Kuonji Days"; Transliteration: "Kuonji Deizu" (Japanese: クオンジデイズ)	January 13, 2008
The one-week trial period commences and Ren is assigned to assist the other servants while learning his job. On the last day of the trial, Ren breaks a memento of the previous master after chasing a ferret of Yume's school's board member's wife. Instead of punishment, Ren passes the trial because of his hard work and he is hired as Shinra's personal attendant.
3	"Universe"; Transliteration: "Shinrabanshō" (Japanese: 森羅万象)	January 20, 2008
Ren is settling into his role and duties in the Kuonji household and trying to get used to Shinra's antics and teasing of both to him and her sister Miyu. However, fed up with being constantly teased by her sister Shinra, Miyu suggest a capture the flag competition in the Kuonji mansion, in which the winner can do whatever they want to the losers.
4	"Spring! Training! Family Vacation!?"; Transliteration: "Haru da! Shugyō da! Kazokuryokō!?" (Japanese: 春だ! 修行だ! 家族旅行!?)	January 27, 2008
After Ren makes a mistake whilst making tea for Miyu, Shinra decides to have everyone relax at the beach. Shortly after arriving, Ren undergoes grueling training to ensure he can prepare tea properly. At the same time Venis and Natose end up at the mercy of some loan sharks at one of the local casinos.
5	"Elegance"; Transliteration: "MIYABI"	February 3, 2008
Ren and Venis are kidnapped by some thugs. During their captivity, Venis talks about her past and what she did before she met the Colonel.
6	"Dream Remodeling Plan"; Transliteration: "Yume Kaizō Keikaku" (Japanese: 夢改造計画)	February 10, 2008
Yume furiously writes in her journal late at night (in a way resembling the anime Death Note), and leaves for school the next morning forgetting both her lunch and her panties. That afternoon and exhausted and half asleep Ren, examines Yume's journal. After discovering its shocking contents (where Yume styles herself an incredibly popular magical girl crime fighter), Ren calls a meeting the next day for everyone to discuss bringing out Yume's true self. However, Yume seems to have no aptitude for any of their suggestions (ranging from taking up a hobby to joining a girl gang). That evening Ren encourages Yume to be herself, and she rewards him with a kiss.
7	"Kuonji Household Annihilation!? The Client was Ageha-sama!"; Transliteration: "Kuonji-ke Zenmetsu!? Raihōsha wa Ageha-sama datta!" (Japanese: 久遠寺家全滅!? 来訪者は揚羽様だった!)	February 17, 2008
Accompanied by her troupe of loyal soldiers, heiress to the Kuki Conglomerate and friend of Yume, Ageha Kuki, arrives at the Kuonji household. Ageha frequently engages in vigorous martial arts training with her servant Kojūrō, but after he accidentally falls down a waterfall after a particularly active session her father decides to send Ageha to the Kuonji household to learn self-restraint. After having the mansion cleaned up and offering gifts to the Kuonji women, she begins to train with Ren. Ren throws himself in front of Ageha to save her from an assassin's dart, and even though this proves unnecessary as Ageha was able to grab the dart herself she rewards his loyalty with a kiss.
8	"Takeda VS Uesugi"; Transliteration: "Taiketsu Uesugi tai Takeda" (Japanese: 対決 上杉 対 武田)	February 24, 2008
Kojūrō finally recovers and waits to escort Ageha home after she finishes school. She decides to return to the Kuonji household instead as she is attracted to Ren. Kojūrō sees Ren and Ageha kissing and challenges Ren to a duel. The winner gets to keep Ageha. Ren parodies G Gundam by reciting the Shining Finger chant, followed by Kojūrō yelling "Become the light!!" in the vein of Gaogaigar, interrupted by Taisa in the vein of Master Asia.
9	"A Little Hero"; Transliteration: "Chīsana Eiyū" (Japanese: 小さな英雄)	March 1, 2008
While undertaking the task of being Miyu's personal attendant, Ren becomes concerned with Miyu's apparent lack of direction. Meanwhile, Yume is increasingly bothered by the lack of attention she is given, especially by Shinra.
10	"Turnabout! Natose Cometh"; Transliteration: "Gyakuten! Natose Taidama Sanjō" (Japanese: 逆転! ナトセ只今参上)	March 8, 2008
Yume goes missing from the Kuonji household after an argument with her sister Shinra. Ren and Natose go out to search for her, and more is revealed about Natose's past and the reasons for her affection for Ren and Yume. Shinra is revealed not to be as heartless towards as she appears when she returns home. The past of the Kuonji siblings is revealed; they lost their parents at a young age and Shinra decided that she had to be strong (and not cry) in order to keep her family together. This caused the friction between her and the child Yume who thought that because she didn't cry, she didn't care about their parents.
11	"All Aboard for the Flower Festivities"; Transliteration: "Hanami Taikaida yo! Zen'in Shūgō!" (Japanese: 花見大会だよ! 全員集合!)	March 15, 2008
Chiharu realised he has fallen in love with Venis, much to everyone's surprise. Later the Kounji household hold their cherry blossom festival in a park with games and jokes. During the festivities Ren together with others managed to stop and capture 3 burglars that are stealing a woman's purse. The Kuonji household is in for a big surprise when Ren and Hato-nee's step-father sees the newspaper article extolling Ren's efforts during Hanami and so finds out where they have been hiding from him.
12	"One Dirty Butler"; Transliteration: "Doromamire Shitsuji Hitori" (Japanese: 泥まみれ執事ひとり)	March 22, 2008
Shinra is troubled because her mentor said her performance wasn't as good as her earlier work, so Ren decides to ask Shinra out on a nice date (Colonel even makes sure Ren wins Shinra a panda by disguising himself as the custodian) but Shinra gets angry at Ren because he says he understands her feelings and asks Colonel to drive her to the rehearsal. On the way home Ren sees his father and gets angry at him when his father says it was his fault that Ren's mother died by giving birth to him (not literally). The two prepare to fight.
13	"Family"; Transliteration: "Kazoku" (Japanese: 家族)	March 29, 2008
Shinra prepares for her concert and Ren tries to deal with his father on his own. During the fight which breaks out between him and his father, Ren realizes who his true family is. During her performance, Shinra abandons her perfectionist attitude and finally exposes her true style and true self. After the performance, and before her encore, she surprises Ren who is waiting for her backstage with a kiss. Ren and Mihato are both accepted as part of the family. The sisters then start fighting over who Ren is going to serve personally; the fight is interrupted by the arrival of Ageha who drops her name into contention.

=== Audio CDs ===
A set of three drama CDs have been released based on the series. The first was released on August 24, 2007, and the second was released on October 26, 2007; the third followed on December 28, 2007. A radio drama CD was released on November 30, 2007.
