= Maiden Blood =

Japanese anime television series

- Genre: Action; Dark fantasy
- Created by: Seiji Kishi; Makoto Uezu; Pony Canyon
- Anime television series
- Directed by: Seiji Kishi
- Written by: Makoto Uezu
- Music by: Monaca
- Studio: Polygon Pictures
- Original run: 2027 – scheduled
- icon

Maiden Blood is an upcoming original Japanese anime television series produced by Polygon Pictures. The series is directed by Seiji Kishi and features series composition by Makoto Uezu, original character designs by Lam, and music composed by Monaca (Keiichi Okabe, Kuniyuki Takashi, and Taichi Joraku). It is scheduled to premiere in 2027.

== Plot ==
During the final apocalyptic war of Armageddon, a desperate human plea overturned destiny and empowered the Evil God, causing the cosmic Renewal of the World to fail for the first time. With the sun extinguished and nature's laws shattered, humanity is reduced to chattel. Billions of souls are sacrificed, and the few survivors are left to suffer under the torment of demons, where human blood serves as the ultimate currency and fuel. To fight back, mages create a forbidden ritual turning human blood into weapons, giving rise to cursed warriors capable of slaying demons. Epica is the strongest of these warriors, but her soul is stolen away and her power remains dormant. The only key to awakening her is the blood of her older sister, Eva, a paralyzed girl. Bound together by fate in a dark world, the two sisters must use Eva's blood to fuel Epica and unleash a vengeful slaughter against the demons.

== Characters ==
Eva (エヴァ)
Voiced by: Iori Saeki
Epica (エピカ, Epika)
Voiced by: Yukari Anzai
