= Takahiro (writer) =

Japanese manga novelist and screenwriter (born 1981)

- タカヒロ
- Born: Takahiro Imaizumi (今泉 貴博); 1981 (age 44–45); Shibuya, Tokyo, Japan
- Occupations: Writer, scriptwriter
- Writing career
- Notable works: Akame ga Kill!; Yuki Yuna is a Hero; Release the Spyce; Chained Soldier

Takahiro Imaizumi (Japanese: 今泉 貴博, Hepburn: Imaizumi Takahiro; born 1981), known mononymously as Takahiro (Japanese: タカヒロ) is a Japanese novelist, manga artist and screenwriter. He is the chairman of Japanese visual novel studio Minato Soft.

He is best known for his anime and manga series Akame ga Kill! and Yuki Yuna is a Hero.

== Works ==
=== Visual novels ===
- Tsuyokiss (2005)
- Kimi ga Aruji de Shitsuji ga Ore de (co-written with Makoto Kanata; 2007)
- Maji de Watashi ni Koi Shinasai! (2009)
  - Maji de Watashi ni Koishinasai! S (2011)
  - Maji de Watashi ni Koishinasai! A-set (2018)
- Anekouji Naoko to Gin'iro no Shinigami (co-written with Ou Jackson; 2015)
- Kurogane Kaikitan -Sen'ya Ichiya- (2015)
- Girls Beyond the Wasteland (2016)
- Waga Himegimi ni Eikan o (2021)

=== Anime ===
- Kimi ga Aruji de Shitsuji ga Ore de (Series composition, Script; 2008)
- Samurai Flamenco (Script; 2013–2014)
- Akame ga Kill! (Original creator, Scenario supervisor; 2014)
- Yuki Yuna is a Hero (Original creator, Script; 2014)
- Girls Beyond the Wasteland (Original creator, 2016)
- Yuki Yuna is a Hero: Hero Chapter (Original creator, Script; 2017)
- Release the Spyce (Original Creator, Series composition, Script; 2018)
- MiniYuri (Series composition, Script; 2019)
- World Dai Star (Original creator, Script; 2023)
- Chained Soldier (Original creator, 2024)

=== Original video animations ===
- 15 Bishōjo Hyōryūki (Original creator; 2009)
- YuruYuri (Script; 2019)

=== Manga ===
- Akame ga Kill! (2010–2016)
- Akame ga Kill! Zero (2013–2019)
- Hinowa ga Crush! (2017–2022)
- Chained Soldier (2019–)
- Gokusotsu Kraken (2022–)

=== Novels ===
- Washio Sumi wa Yūsha de Aru (2014)

=== Video games ===
- Atelier Resleriana: Forgotten Alchemy & the Liberator of Polar Night (Writer; 2023)
