= Chained Soldier =

Japanese manga series and its adaptation(s)

- First tankōbon volume cover, featuring Kyouka Uzen

魔都精兵のスレイブ (Mato Seihei no Sureibu)
- Genre: Action; Dark fantasy
- Manga
- Written by: Takahiro
- Illustrated by: Yohei Takemura
- Published by: Shueisha
- English publisher: NA: Yen Press
- Imprint: Jump Comics+
- Magazine: Shōnen Jump+
- Original run: January 5, 2019 – present
- Volumes: 22
- Anime television series
- Directed by: Junji Nishimura (chief) (S1); Gorō Kuji (S1); Masafumi Tamura (S2)
- Produced by: Yuuki Watanabe; Emi Kashimura; Hirofumi Itou (S1); Huang Jinglei (S1); Shouta Watase (S1); Minami Fukushima (S2); Aya Iizuka (S2); Pei Yanjie (S2)
- Written by: Yasuhiro Nakanishi
- Music by: Kohta Yamamoto
- Studio: Seven Arcs (S1); Passione (S2); Hayabusa Film (S2)
- Licensed by: Sentai Filmworks: SA/SEA: Muse Communication
- Original network: AT-X (uncensored); Tokyo MX, BS Asahi, MBS (censored)
- Original run: January 4, 2024 – present
- Episodes: 24
- icon

Chained Soldier, known in Japan as Mato Seihei no Slave (Japanese: 魔都精兵のスレイブ, Hepburn: Mato Seihei no Sureibu; lit. 'Slave of the Magic Capital's Elite Troops'), is a Japanese web manga series written by Takahiro and illustrated by Yohei Takemura. It has been serialized on Shueisha's Shōnen Jump+ online platform since January 2019.

The series is set in a near-future Japan where portals to a dangerous dimension, called Mato, have appeared across the country. In response, the government establishes the Mato Defense Force (MDF), a special military unit composed of superpowered women, to protect humankind and fight the dimension's inhabitants. The story follows Yuuki Wakura, a young man who accidentally wanders into Mato and is rescued by Kyouka Uzen, a top-ranking MDF officer.

An anime television series adaptation, animated by Seven Arcs, aired from January to March 2024. A second season, animated by Passione and Hayabusa Film, aired from January to March 2026. A third season has been announced.

By August 2026, the manga had over 6.8 million copies in circulation.

== Plot ==
Several decades ago, mysterious gates opened across Japan, leading to an alternate dimension known as "Mato" (魔都; lit. ' Demonic Metropolis'). Two notable things were discovered within: malicious creatures known as "Shuuki" (醜鬼, Shūki), who are hostile towards humans, and Peaches, which grant superhuman powers to those who eat them. Since only women can gain powers by eating peaches, gender inequality was flipped and the world became matriarchal. To combat the Shuuki and establish a presence in Mato, the Japanese government took control of the portals and established the Mato Defense Force, a special paramilitary unit under the Japan Self-Defence Forces, tasked with protecting humanity and operating within the dimension.

In 2020, high school senior Yuuki Wakura is set to graduate and enter the workforce when he accidentally wanders through an open portal into Mato and is attacked by a horde of Shuuki. Kyouka Uzen, commander of the Mato Defense Force's 7th Squad, rescues him, but they are both cornered by increasing numbers of Shuuki. Kyouka offers to place Yuuki under her power, so he can fight on her behalf as a combat slave so they can survive. After the battle, Kyouka is forced to reward Yuuki for his efforts fighting the Shuuki, which, in his case, involve kissing and intimate physical contact.

Recognizing Yuuki's potential, Kyouka offers him a job with their unit after he graduates. Eager to become a hero and avenge his missing older sister, Yuuki accepts. The story follows Yuuki's service in the Mato Defense Force as Kyouka's combat slave and base caretaker, while he explores Mato and discovers its mysteries.

== Characters ==
=== Mato Defense Force ===
The service branch that operates within and handles all affairs related to Mato, under the jurisdiction of Japan's Ministry of Defense. It is divided into nine operational squadrons, numbered 1–10 (excluding 4 due to tetraphobia), and an away unit tasked with exploring Mato and harvesting peaches for consumption. Each squadron is based in an area of Mato based on the eight main compass points, except for the 10th Squad, which is located in central Mato and serves as the force's headquarters.

Yuuki Wakura (和倉 優希, Wakura Yūki)
Voiced by: Yūya Hirose (Japanese); Gabriel Regojo, Brittany Lauda (young) (English)
A high school graduate, Yuuki serves as base caretaker and frontline combatant for the Mato Defense Force's 7th Squad. He was hired after wandering into Mato and being rescued by squad commander Kyouka Uzen. Yuuki seeks to become a hero and avenge his sister Aoba, who was lost in a Mato accident five years earlier. While he lacks superhuman powers, Yuuki can transform into a canine-esque Slave Form when under any of the girls' powers, granting him enhanced physical capabilities; his form's appearance and abilities vary with his master. Outside of combat, he is highly skilled in domestic duties such as cooking and cleaning, and also has some basic self-defense skills.
Kyouka Uzen (羽前 京香, Uzen Kyōka)
Voiced by: Akari Kitō (Japanese); Roxanna George (English)
Commander of the Mato Defense Force's 7th Squad, Kyouka is the sole survivor of a Mato incident that destroyed her hometown. Dedicated to eradicating the Shuuki threat, she rescued Yuuki after he wandered into Mato and employed his abilities. Despite her serious demeanor, Kyouka is a caring individual who prioritizes her squad's welfare above all else. Kyouka's goal was to become the Supreme Commander of the MDF, and she has achieved this goal as the current Supreme Commander-elect. Kyouka's ability, "Slave", allows her to enslave any living creature, enhancing its physical attributes for combat. She must also reward enslaved individuals for their service. Kyouka can also lend her slave to others, with the borrower having to reward the slave in her stead. She is also a master swordswoman, and primarily uses a tachi.
Himari Azuma (東 日万凛, Azuma Himari)
Voiced by: Yume Miyamoto (Japanese); Natalie Rial (English)
Second-in-command of the Mato Defense Force's 7th Squad. Himari comes from the prestigious Azuma family, which has long-standing ties to the MDF and other organizations involved in Mato. Prudish and initially hostile towards Yuuki, her demeanor softens after he helps her confront and defeat her arrogant older sister. Her ability is called "Learning", and it allows her to learn and use the abilities of others who have consumed Mato Peaches by observing them, albeit with lesser power. Himari manages these copied abilities by toggling between them on a smartphone. She later powers up this skill, allowing her to rapidly cycle through abilities without having to switch between them manually.
Shushu Suruga (駿河 朱々, Suruga Shushu)
Voiced by: Mari Hino (Japanese); Juliet Simmons (English)
A member of the Mato Defense Force's 7th Squad. Having grown up primarily surrounded by women, Shushu developed a keen interest in Yuuki, whom she frequently teases. She developed genuine feelings for him after he supported her during a difficult battle, and now she strives to be seen by him as a romantic partner, though her attempts to seduce him fail each time. Her ability, "Paradigm Shift", allows her to alter her physical size. She can grow larger, gaining proportional strength and endurance, or shrink for stealth. This power can be applied to her entire body or to specific body parts, and it also affects her clothing and personal belongings.
Nei Ōkawamura (大川村 寧, Ōkawamura Nei)
Voiced by: Hina Tachibana (Japanese); Kristen McGuire (English)
A member of the Mato Defense Force's 7th Squad. Nei is eleven years old and attends elementary school. She was separated from her parents in a Mato disaster, and was taken in by her grandaunt. Nei has enlisted in the Mato Defense Force to find her missing family. She forms a close, sibling-like bond with her squad's caretaker, Yuuki. Her ability is called "Promise", which grants her clairvoyance. Nei can detect and observe targets and events in a large radius (in excess of 20 km), and acts as a dedicated scout for her unit. She can also allow others to see what she sees by having them touch her while her power is active, and she can also show the point of view of any target she has previously touched.
Tenka Izumo (出雲 天花, Izumo Tenka)
Voiced by: Maaya Uchida (Japanese); Kelly Greenshield (English)
Commander of the Mato Defense Force's 6th Squad. Tenka is first introduced when a general order is issued for all the MDF's squads to work more closely together, and she discusses with Kyouka holding a joint training exercise. After meeting Yuuki, Tenka develops an intense crush on him that evolves into head-over-heels love. She takes any opportunity to profess her love for Yuuki, such as flirting with him frequently and even participating in some rewards despite not borrowing him as a Slave. Tenka also fantasizes about marrying Yuuki in the future and having children with him. Her ability is called "Ame-no-Mitori", which grants her the power of spatial manipulation. Within a 50 km radius, she can create portals to travel between locations and obliterate her enemies, and enter restricted areas for espionage purposes.
Yachiho Azuma (東 八千穂, Azuma Yachiho)
Voiced by: Nene Hieda (Japanese); Margaret McDonald (English)
Second-in-command of the Mato Defense Force's 6th Squad, and Himari's older sister. She frequently belittles Himari, urging her to return home, but this behavior masks a deep, obsessive affection. Her ability, "Golden Hour", allows her to manipulate time by striking a pose, enabling her to stop or rewind events for a limited duration. This power is used to gain tactical advantages, rescue comrades, or reposition during combat. Through training, she has extended the duration of this effect, though prolonged use is physically taxing.
Sahara Wakasa (若狭 サハラ, Wakasa Sahara)
Voiced by: Reina Ueda (Japanese); Monica Rial (English)
A member of the Mato Defense Force's 6th Squad, Sahara is known for being constantly sleepy. Her ability, "Crazy Sheep", grants her enhanced physical strength for a predetermined duration between one and sixty minutes, with shorter durations resulting in greater power. Once the time expires, the ability enters a three-minute cooldown period. If she falls unconscious before the duration expires, she can continue to fight with increased power, though she becomes unable to distinguish between allies and foes.
Ginna Bizen (備前 銀奈, Bizen Ginna)
Voiced by: Yuuri Yoshida (Japanese); Brittney Karbowski (English)
A member of the Mato Defense Force's 10th Squad. Ginna has an outgoing, sociable "party girl" personality and is a huge fan of the MDF, especially the squad commanders. She usually performs administrative duties within the corps, such as refereeing inter-squad matches and overseeing large-scale training exercises. She also collects autographs of her favorite personnel as a hobby. Her ability, "Ginna Club", generates protective barriers that she must draw on the ground. Only approved individuals who have signed a roster provided by Ginna may pass through the barrier freely, and any injuries sustained within the barrier heal over time.
Ren Yamashiro (山城 恋, Yamashiro Ren)
Voiced by: Kana Hanazawa (Japanese); Christina Kelly (English)
Supreme Commander of the Mato Defense Force and commander of its 10th Squad. Her fellow commanders describe Ren as extremely powerful and an absolute patriot in Japan's defense. However, her extreme self-confidence borders on hubris. She takes an interest in Yuuki, aiming to make him submit to her, though her attempts often result in her own submission to him, embarrassing her. Her ability, "All-Encompassing Lord of the Cosmos", grants her eight distinct powers associated with different Buddhas, the full details of which are known only to her. Ren was defeated in the election for the next Supreme Commander of the MDF by Kyouka Uzen, and will hand over the position to her after defeating the Gods of Thunder.
Konomi Tatara (多々良 木乃実, Tatara Konomi)
Voiced by: Kana Ichinose (Japanese); Annie Wild (English)
Commander of the Mato Defense Force's 1st Squad, Konomi is a high school student with a lively personality. She respects Kyouka Uzen as her senior disciple under the same martial arts instructor, and develops a friendly rapport with Yuuki. Her ability, "Beast Power", allows her to adopt and use animals' unique abilities by drawing on her inner ki, which she can project as an aura surrounding her body. Konomi integrates her power with her mastery of Xing Yi Quan to defeat enemies in combat, and her power extends beyond living animals to extinct and prehistoric animals, mythical creatures, and even creatures with animalistic characteristics.
Mira Kamiunten (上運天 美羅, Kamiunten Mira)
Voiced by: Fairouz Ai (Japanese); Christie Guidry (English)
Commander of the Mato Defense Force's 2nd Squad, Mira is a former delinquent and gang leader from Okinawa. She is bold and aggressive, with ambitions to become the MDF's Supreme Commander, and views Kyouka Uzen as her primary rival. Despite her belligerent demeanor, she demonstrates a strong sense of camaraderie and kindness toward her comrades. Inexperienced with men, she becomes deeply flustered during intimate interactions, initially when observing Kyouka with Yuuki and later when in a similar situation herself. Her ability, "All-Killing", allows her to create clones of herself, which are just as physically powerful as her, but can only take a limited amount of damage before being destroyed.
Bell Tsukiyono (月夜野 ベル, Tsukiyono Beru)
Voiced by: Manaka Iwami (Japanese); Savanna Menzel (English)
Commander of the Mato Defense Force's 3rd Squad, Bell is shy and reserved, and tends to shrink away from conflict. Previously bullied and having a poor relationship with her parents, she obtained a powerful ability after consuming a Peach and was recruited into the MDF shortly after. Upon joining, she felt her power was insignificant compared to that of other commanders, severely impacting her self-esteem. However, she possesses a tenacious desire and wishes to become braver and a better leader. She is particularly close to Ren Yamashiro. Her ability, "Canopus", has a dual function: it can destroy any target by isolating and removing its life force, and it also grants her a healing factor which keeps her alive, regardless of her injuries.
Yakumo Ezo (蝦夷 夜雲, Ezo Yakumo)
Voiced by: Fūka Izumi (Japanese); Ellen Elise Evans (English)
Commander of the Mato Defense Force's 5th Squad, Yakumo comes from Hokkaido, and enlisted in the MDF to earn money to support her family. Cheerful and free, Yakumo is known by the MDF for being perverted and especially touchy with her fellow servicewomen. This perversion results in her dreams of forming a harem consisting entirely of female MDF personnel. She gains an interest in Yuuki after borrowing his power and decides to make an exception, allowing him to join her future harem. Her ability, "Night Storm", allows her to manipulate air. She can generate strong gusts and tornadoes to attack her foes, and control wind currents to transport herself and others over long distances.
Varvara Pilipenko (ワルワラ・ピリペンコ, Waruwara Piripenko)
Voiced by: Shelby Blocker (English)
Commander of the Mato Defense Force's 8th Squad. Varvara is of Russian descent and was born into a powerful Mafia family. Before graduation, her parents were arrested, and she was later recruited into the MDF. After meeting and training with Kyouka Uzen, Varvara developed a deep respect for her to the point of idolizing her. Her ability "Pantheon" first appeared as a void, which would give her an edge over enemies. Later, it evolved into an alternate dimension resembling a cathedral dedicated to Kyouka. Pantheon's effects also changed, buffing Varvara and anyone who respects Kyouka, and debuffing anyone who dislikes or bears ill will towards Kyouka.
Fubuki Azuma (東 風舞希, Azuma Fubuki)
Voiced by: Yukana (Japanese); Courtney Lomelo (English)
Commander of the Mato Defense Force's 9th Squad. Fubuki is Himari, Yachiho, and Maia's mother, and is the current head of the Azuma family. A perfectionist, Fubuki is strict with her daughters and wishes to see them produce results worthy of the MDF and the Azuma Family. However, Fubuki also cares deeply for her family and wishes to nurture its younger members to be more caring and on better terms with one another. Her power is "Sunset", which allows her to summon a jumonji yari spear. The weapon increases her physical attributes while being wielded, with Fubuki being able to adjust its power output. She can also change the shaft's length at will.
Riu Myouga (冥加 りう, Myōga Riu)
Voiced by: Sayuri Sadaoka (Japanese); Marcy Bannor (English)
Vice-commander of the MDF's 1st Squad, and its former commander. Riu is a veteran MDF servicewoman with many years on the force and extensive combat and operational experience. She is also a skilled martial artist and was the instructor to two of the MDF squad leaders, Kyouka Uzen and Konomi Tatara. In the series, Riu hands over leadership of the MDF 1st Squad to her protégé Konomi, while remaining as an adviser and vice-commander. Her power is "White Mausoleum", which allows her to summon a being from the afterlife to fight by her side. While active, both Riu and her summoned target gain a boost to their physical abilities. Riu usually summons her late husband, a swordsman, as her battle partner.
Maia Azuma (東 麻衣亜, Azuma Maia)
Voiced by: Kaori Maeda (Japanese); Jade Kelly (English)
Vice-commander of the MDF's 9th Squad, Fubuki Azuma's eldest daughter, and Yachiho and Himari's elder sister. Maia has a serious personality and is diligent in performing her duties and assisting her mother. She gets her moment in the spotlight during a joint training session with Yuuki Wakura, in which she is tasked with proving her resolve in a hostage rescue and protection mission (with Yuuki as the hostage). Outside of serving in the MDF, Maia is an avid gamer and regularly streams her gameplay sessions online. Her power, called "The Great One", allows her to create two hands she can control at will, using any available material, even thin air.
Ema Makura (万倉 江真, Makura Ema)
A high school student, who is also best friends with Konomi Tatara the Commander of the 1st Unit. Ema later enlisted into the MDF and joined the 1st unit, her peach ability "Thorn Power" allows her to manifest vines with incredibly sharp thorns from her body which can be used for both offense and defense. Ema is hinted to have feelings for Konomi as she offered to kiss her, in order to let her experience it.
Megumi Zaha (座覇 めぐみ, Zaha Megumi)
The vice commander of the 2nd Unit and Mira Kamiyuten's right-hand woman. Her Peach ability, "Red Soul," allows her to manifest a flag that she can use to boost her allies' power. Megumi often uses her ability to boost Mira's physical abilities when she is in combat, as seen during her fight against Kuusetsu of the Eight Thunder Gods.
Kaiko Itsuki (五木 カイコ, Itsuki Kaiko)
Voiced by: Anna Yamaki (Japanese); Carli Mosier (English)
The Vice Commander of the 5th Unit, her peach ability "Miracle Cure" allows her to heal others by encasing them in a cocoon that instantly heals any injury. Kaiko often uses her ability to heal the members of the Demon Defense Force as they often fight Shuuki or the Eight Thunder Gods.
Saki Tokoroyama (所山 サキ, Tokoroyama Saki)
Voiced by: Hina Kino (Japanese); Caitlynn French (English)
A member of the 5th Unit of the Demon Defense Force, she rarely shows any emotion and almost always has a blank look on her face. Her Peach ability, "Bang Bang Bang", allows her to turn any part of her body into a weapon, which includes guns, swords, shields, and armor. Her ability is mostly used by Himari Azuma, who copied it with her ability, "Learning".
Prachi Sherawat (プラチ・シェラワット, Purachi Sherawatto)
The Vice Commander of the 8th Unit of Demon Defense Force. She is extremely fond of comedy sketches. Her peach ability, "Urumi," allows her to manifest whips that she is extremely quick and precise with.
Jenna Staples (ジェナ・ステープルズ, Jena Sutēpuruzu)
A member of the 8th Unit of the Demon Defense Force, her ability, "Hero," allows her to manifest a powerful sword and shield. Jenna's appearance also changes from her MDF uniform to a set of bikini armor, complete with breastplate, thong, gauntlets, greaves, and a domino mask.
Homare Azuma (東 誉, Azuma Homare)
Voiced by: Yuna Nemoto (Japanese); Katelyn Barr (English)
The stepdaughter of Fubuki and stepsister of Maia, Yachiho, and Himari. In the past, she severely bullied Himari, as she was seen as inferior to the other Azumas. But she begrudgingly gained respect for Himari after Homare was defeated during the recent Azuma Banquet. Homare's Peach ability "Python" allows her to reprogram her body like a computer, which allows her to boost her physical abilities to superhuman levels. Homare originally wanted to seduce Yuuki to gain an edge over Himari, but she eventually gained genuine feelings for him and flirts with him whenever they meet.
Tobera Azuma (東 海桐花, Azuma Tobera)
Voiced by: Shiori Izawa (Japanese); Hilary Haag (English)
Former Supreme Commander of the MDF, Fubuki's mother, and grandmother of Maia, Yachiho, and Himari. Tobera was originally the Head of the Azuma Clan until the Azuma Banquet, where Fubuki ended up becoming the new Head. Tobera's Peach ability, "Ephemeral", allows her to absorb life energy from anything or anyone that allows her to retain her youth, as a result, she has the appearance of a young teenage girl despite her age. Tobera became interested in Yuuki and often encourages the women of the Azuma Clan to mate with him, even offering herself if necessary.
Haruno Kue (久重 遙乃, Kue Haruno)
A member of the 7th Unit of the Demon Defense Force, for the majority of the series, Haruno had been serving on the Corps Away Team. Her Peach ability, "Origami," allows her to bring her origami animals to life as Shikigami that she can control at will. Haruno eventually rejoined the 7th Unit and continued to help Kyouka and Yuuki ever since.

=== Humanoid Shuuki ===
The Humanoid Shuuki are women who were victims of Mato disasters and were forced to eat peaches to survive the hostile environment. Due to the conditions of Mato, they underwent physical and mental changes, gaining powers and resembling Shuuki in the process. Despite their condition, most still retain vestiges of their original appearance and personalities. Their condition also enables them to command ordinary Shuuki and consume multiple peaches without adverse effects. Though initially hostile, they forged a truce with the MDF. Kyouka promised to change the organization's policies to help them once she became Supreme Commander.

Aoba Wakura (和倉 青羽, Wakura Aoba)
Voiced by: Tomori Kusunoki (Japanese); Karlii Hoch (English)
Yuuki's older sister, who disappeared in a Mato disaster five years before the series' events. While trapped in Mato, she consumed a Peach to survive, and had to fight to keep her senses through sheer willpower when she began mutating into a humanoid Shuuki. Aoba currently leads a small community of humanoid Shuuki that have settled deep in the caverns of Mato. As children, Aoba was responsible for training Yuuki in domestic chores and basic self-defense, and is incredibly possessive of him. Though she is initially hostile towards the MDF, Aoba eventually forges a truce with the 7th and 6th Squads, and strikes up a friendship with 6th Squad Commander Tenka Izumo. Her power, "Invincible", grants her prehensile hair. She can extend it to any length she desires, and use her hair in combat to attack or defend herself. Aoba also regularly consumes Peaches to boost her physical abilities.
Koko Zenibako (銭函 ココ, Zenibako Koko)
Voiced by: Sayaka Senbongi (Japanese); Brittany Lauda (English)
One of the humanoid Shuuki under Aoba's command. Koko has a cheery disposition, and is good at looking after others. She also has a strong personality, and is obsessed with fighting. Initially hostile towards the MDF, Koko made peace with them after being abducted and then rescued from the clutches of the Gods of Thunder, and developed a crush on Yuuki. Her power, "Koko Juice", allows her to secrete slippery bodily fluids that make her harder to hit, and also imbues her saliva with healing properties.
Naon Yuno (湯野 波音, Yuno Naon)
Voiced by: Rina Hidaka (Japanese); Allison Sumrall (English)
One of the humanoid Shuuki under Aoba's command, Naon is a former model who lost her livelihood when she was involved in a Mato disaster. After being rescued, she was imprisoned by the Onmyou Agency, which experimented on her condition and barred her from seeing her family. Naon eventually managed to escape with Koko and other prisoners, and settled in Mato. Once hostile towards the MDF, Naon made peace with them after being abducted and then rescued from the clutches of the Gods of Thunder, and developed a crush on Yuuki. Naon is also precocious, and is constantly seeking ways to become beautiful. Her ability, "Hidden Beauty", allows her to become intangible, and hide or pass through solid objects and other living beings.

=== Eight Gods of Thunder ===
Also known as the Hachiraishin (八雷神, Hachiraishin), they are a group who rule Mato and control the Shuuki. They serve as the overarching enemies of the MDF, and humanity in general. Their main goal is to bring ruin to the human world, as retribution for them invading Mato and harvesting its Peaches without their approval. Each member is incredibly powerful, requiring multiple MDF members to engage them on equal footing in combat. Of the eight Gods, only two are still active. Six of them have been defeated in battle by the MDF, with their physical bodies destroyed, and their spirits living on inside Yuuki Wakura due to him ingesting parts of them.

Rairen (雷煉)
Voiced by: Kujira (Japanese); Monica Rial (English)
One of the Eight Gods of Thunder, and their only male member. Rairen is a confident, arrogant warmonger, and believes that all humans are beneath him in terms of strength and intelligence. Immensely strong and durable, Rairen has power over lightning and fire. He is first seen attacking the MDF's 6th and 7th Squads during their inter-squad training exercise. Though he manages to overpower most of the MDF personnel, he is defeated in single combat by Tenka Izumo, and has to be rescued by his fellow god Shikoku. Rairen's second encounter with the MDF sees him facing the members of the 7th Squad. Though he initially has the upper hand, Rairen falls to Bell Tsukiyono's Canopus power, and his physical body is destroyed. A small piece of his spirit lives on inside Yuuki Wakura, due to the latter biting and ingesting a part of his body in combat.
Shikoku (紫黒)
Voiced by: Mako Morino (Japanese); Maggie Flecknoe (English)
One of the Eight Gods of Thunder. Shikoku is one of their elder members, and is also their main strategist. She resembles a gorgon, with a snake motif on her kimono and live snakes in her hair. Shikoku has the power to manipulate these snakes to attack and poison her enemies, and also has the power to control darkness. Unlike most of the Gods of Thunder, Shikoku is fascinated by humans, despite seeing them as enemies, and enjoys human forms of entertainment such as video games. Shikoku became fond of Yuuki and later kidnapped him, along with Shushu. During his time in captivity, Shikoku messed around with him.
Jouryuu (壌竜, Jōryū)
Voiced by: Hitomi Nabatame (Japanese); Rachael Messer (English)
One of the Eight Gods of Thunder. She has dark skin, and has features of an Eastern dragon such as scales and antlers. Despite her strength and power, Jouryuu is stoic and rarely speaks, preferring to follow her fellow Gods in planning attacks on humanity. Jouryuu has the power to manipulate the earth, and can also heal others through direct skin contact. Later on, when the Demon Defense Force launched an attack on the Thunder Gods, she, along with Naruhime, were both defeated by the combined efforts of the Azumas and the 7th Unit. Jouryuu's spirit currently resides in Yuuki's mind, along with her 5 siblings and fellow Thunder Gods.
Kuusetsu (空折, Kūsetsu)
Voiced by: Ami Koshimizu (Japanese); Jad Saxton (English)
One of the Eight Gods of Thunder, Kuusetsu is one of their younger members. Unlike the other Gods, Kuusetsu did not originally have a human form, instead resembling an egg with feet and tendrils. She had to absorb other living beings to gain strength and power, brought to her by her fellow Gods. Upon absorbing Naon and Koko, Kuusetsu adopts a human form resembling both of them. Besides incredible physical strength and stamina, Kuusetsu can also adopt and copy the abilities and attributes of any being she absorbs. She encountered the MDF in Yokohama, and began her operation to abduct and absorb its citizens foiled. She was eventually defeated in battle by Kyouka Uzen, and all of her victims were rescued alive. Her spirit lives on inside Yuuki Wakura, due to forcing him to ingest some of her bodily fluids when she ambushed him while alone.
Fukuma (伏摩)
Voiced by: Kana Hanazawa (Japanese); Molly Searcy (English)
One of the Eight Gods of Thunder, Fukuma is one of their younger members. She has the power to shapeshift, changing her physical appearance to match anything and anyone. Fukuma used this power in an attempt to destroy the MDF by infiltrating their ranks, taking on the form of 3rd Squad Chief Bell Tsukiyono. Though she was successful in posing as Bell, she was found out by Yuuki Wakura, who devised a plan to ambush and expose her. Fukuma was eventually defeated in battle by Varvara Pilipenko and the members of the MDF's 8th Squad. Due to accidentally kissing Yuuki before being exposed, a piece of Fukuma's spirit entered him, and she now lives on inside him.
Jaku'un (若雲)
Voiced by: Minami Tsuda (Japanese); Emi Lo (English)
One of the Eight Gods of Thunder, Jaku'un is the youngest member. She has the power to place curses on others. Jaku'un used this power to create curses to weaken the powers of others. She was eventually defeated in battle against Yakumo Ezo single-handedly. Her spirit currently resides within Yuuki Wakura, along with her 5 siblings and fellow Thunder Gods.
Taikyoku (大極)
Voiced by: Mamiko Noto
One of the Eight Thunder Gods and its leader, she is undisputedly the strongest of all the Thunder Gods. Taikyoku had been guarding their mother "Izanami" until Kuusetsu's defeat caused her to show herself and retake her position as leader from Shikoku.
Naruhime (鳴姫)
Voiced by: Manami Numakura
One of the Eight Thunder Gods, Naruhime is one of the younger siblings and has a hot headed personality. Naruhime has the ability to manipulate lightning and like her other siblings has a second form that exponentially increases her power. Naruhime along with Jouryuu were defeated by the combined efforts of the Azumas and 7th unit. Her spirit currently resides within Yuuki Wakura along with her 5 siblings and fellow Thunder Gods.

== Media ==
=== Manga ===
Written by Takahiro and illustrated by Yohei Takemura, Chained Soldier began on Shueisha's Shōnen Jump+ online platform on January 5, 2019. Shueisha has collected its chapters into individual tankōbon volumes. The first volume was released on March 4, 2019. As of November 4, 2026, 22 volumes have been released.

The manga has been licensed for English release in North America by Yen Press.

==== Volumes ====
| No. | Original release date | Original ISBN | English release date | English ISBN |
|---|---|---|---|---|
| 1 | March 4, 2019 | 978-4-08-881786-6 | August 16, 2022 | 978-1-9753-4608-9 |
1. "The Birth of a Slave" (スレイブの誕生, Sureibu no Tanjō); 2. "The Pro Elite Soldiers & the Pro Caretaker" (精兵(プロ)と管理人(プロ), Puro to Puro); 3. "The Misery of a Slave" (スレイブの憂鬱, Sureibu no Yūutsu); 4. "The Wit of a Slave" (スレイブの機転, Sureibu no Kiten); 5. "The Encouragement of a Slave" (スレイブの奮起, Sureibu no Funki)
| 2 | July 4, 2019 | 978-4-08-881896-2 | October 4, 2022 | 978-1-9753-4610-2 |
6. "The Older Sister of a Slave – Part I" (スレイブの姉 前編, Sureibu no Ane: Zenpen); 7. "The Older Sister of a Slave – Part II" (スレイブの姉 後編, Sureibu no Ane: Kōhen); 8. "The Boss of a Slave (スレイブの上司", Sureibu no Jōshi); 9. "The (Third) Birth of a Slave" (スレイブの誕生 (3回目), Sureibu no Tanjō (San-kaime)); 10. "A New Power" (新しい力, Atarashii Chikara); 11. "The Situation with the Azuma Family" (東家の事情, Azuma-ya no Jijō); 12. "Finishing Move" (必殺技, Hissatsu Waza); 13. "Start of the Intersquad Tournament" (交流戦開始, Kōryūsen Kaishi); 14. "Sister Showdown (姉妹対決", Shimai Taiketsu)
| 3 | November 1, 2019 | 978-4-08-882113-9 | February 21, 2023 | 978-1-9753-4612-6 |
15. "Yachiho and Himari" (八千穂と日万凛, Yachiho to Himarin); 16. "Burning Master" (燃えるご主人, Moeru Goshujin); 17. "The Second Match" (第二試合, Dainishiai); 18. "Violent Attack" (強襲, Kyōshū); 19. "Commander of the 7th Squad" (七番組組長, Nana Bangumi Kumichō); 20. "Commander of the 6th Squad" (六番組組長, Roku Bangumi Kumichō); 21. "The Slave After the Intersquad Tournament" (交流戦後のスレイブ, Kōryū Sengo no Sureibu); 22. "The (Fourth) Birth of a Slave" (スレイブの誕生 (4回目), Sureibu no Tanjō (Yon-kaime)); 23. "Scouting for a Slave" (スレイブのスカウト, Sureibu no Sukauto)
| 4 | March 4, 2020 | 978-4-08-882235-8 | June 20, 2023 | 978-1-9753-4614-0 |
24. "The Slave & the Commander" (スレイブと組長, Sureibu to Kumichō); 25. "The Slave's Superior" (スレイブの上司, Sureibu no Jōshi); 26. "Sure to Find" (きっと見つける, Kitto Mitsukeru); 27. "Yuuki & Aoba" (優希と青羽, Yūki to Aoba); 28. "Reunion" (再会, Saikai); 29. "Hidden Village" (隠れ里, Kakurezato); 30. "Premonition of Trouble" (波乱の予感, Haran no Yokan)
| 5 | July 3, 2020 | 978-4-08-882359-1 | September 19, 2023 | 978-1-9753-4616-4 |
31. "A Glimpse of Darkness" (垣間見えた闇, Kaima Mieta Yami); 32. "Battle in the Hidden Village" (隠れ里の戦い, Kakurezato no Tatakai); 33. "The Restrained Slave" (拘束のスレイブ, Kōsoku no Sureibu); 34. "Deadly Bear Hunt" (死闘熊狩り, Shitō Kuma Kari); 35. "Instant Battles" (刹那の攻防戦, Setsuna no Kōbōsen); 36. "The Spirit of the 7th Squad" (七番組の精神, Nana Bangumi no Seishin); 37. "Tenka vs Aoba" (天花VS青羽, Tenka VS Aoba); 38. "Love for a Slave" (スレイブへの愛, Sureibu e no Ai); 39. "Revealed Name" (明かされた名, Akasa Reta na)
| 6 | December 4, 2020 | 978-4-08-882481-9 | January 23, 2024 | 978-1-9753-4619-5 |
40. "Slave of Rage" (怒りのスレイブ, Ikari no Sureibu); 41. "Wild Mountain Cherry Blossoms" (乱れ山桜, Midare Yamazakura); 42. "The Slave's Resolve" (スレイブの決意, Sureibu no Ketsui); 43. "Quickening" (胎動, Taidō); 44. "The Slave's Master" (スレイブの主, Sureibu no Aruji); 45. "Foreboding of a Storm" (嵐の予感, Arashi no Yokan); 46. "Congregation of Commanders" (組長集結, Kumichō Shūketsu); 47. "The Assembly Begins" (会議開始, Kaigi Kaishi)
| 7 | April 2, 2021 | 978-4-08-882604-2 | April 16, 2024 | 978-1-9753-7916-2 |
48. "The Supreme Commander's Battle" (総組長の戦い, Sō Kumichō no Tatakai); 49. "Battle Over the Slave" (スレイブ攻防戦, Sureibu Kōbōsen); 50. "A Slave's Gratitude" (スレイブの感謝, Sureibu no Kansha); 51. "Ren's Shadow" (恋の影, Ren no Kage); 52. "The Storm Touches Down" (やってきた嵐, Yattekita Arashi); 53. "Slave Soaring Through the Air" (スレイブ空を舞う, Sureibu Sora o Mau); 54. "Training Season" (鍛える季節, Kitaeru Kisetsu); 55. "Berserk" (暴走, Bōsō); 56. "Disciplining" (躾, Shitsuke)
| 8 | August 4, 2021 | 978-4-08-882743-8 | July 23, 2024 | 978-1-9753-8795-2 |
57. "The Apex of Life" (生命の極み, Inochi no Kiwami); 58. "Haggard Slave" (憔悴のスレイブ, Shōsui no Sureibu); 59. "What It Means to Be an Azuma" (東というもの, Azuma to Iu Mono); 60. "The Banquet Begins" (晩餐開始, Bansan Kaishi); 61. "High-Speed Battle" (超速対決, Chōsoku Taiketsu); 62. "In High Spirits" (意気衝天, Ikishōten); 63. "Commander of the 9th Squad" (九番組組長, Kyū Bangumi Kumichō); 64. "Himari's Resolve" (日万凜の想い, Himari no Omoi); 65. "A New Azuma" (新たなる東, Aratanaru Azuma)
| 9 | December 3, 2021 | 978-4-08-882857-2 | October 15, 2024 | 978-1-9753-8797-6 |
66. "Night at the Azuma Estate" (東家の夜, Azuma-ya no Yoru); 67. "Mother, Daughter, and Slave" (母娘とスレイブ, Oyako to Sureibu); 68. "The Slave's Late Summer" (スレイブの晩夏, Sureibu no Banka); 69. "The Chains Grow Stronger" (強くなる鎖, Tsuyoku naru Kusari); 70. "Anomaly in the Human World" (現世での異変, Gense de no Ihen); 71. "In Yokohama" (横浜にて, Yokohama Nite); 72. "Commander of the 2nd Squad" (二番組 組長, Ni Bangumi Kumichō); 73. "God's Will" (神の思惑, Kami no Omowaku)
| 10 | May 2, 2022 | 978-4-08-883109-1 | January 21, 2025 | 978-1-9753-8799-0 |
74. "The Slave and Kuusetsu" (スレイブと空折, Sureibu to Kūsetsu); 75. "The Commander's Resolution" (組長の覚悟, Kumichō no Kakugo); 76. "Heated Battle with a God" (神との激闘, Kami to no Gekitō); 77. "Marvels of the Eight Thunder Gods" (八雷神の驚異, Hachiraijin no Kyōi); 78. "Yokohama Showdown - Part 1" (横浜決戦 (前編), Yokohama Kessen (Zenpen)); 79. "Yokohama Showdown - Part 2" (横浜決戦 (後編), Yokohama Kessen (Kōhen)); 80. "Eternal Chains: Slave - Heaven" (無窮の鎖(スレイブ)・天, Sureibu Ten); 81. "Kuusetsu" (空折, Kūsetsu)
| 11 | September 2, 2022 | 978-4-08-883234-0 | April 22, 2025 | 978-1-9753-8801-0 |
82. "After the Battle in Yokohama" (横浜戦、その後, Yokohama-sen, Sonogo); 83. "Mira's Resolve" (美羅の決意, Mira no Ketsui); 84. "Mira's Reward" (美羅のご褒美, Mira no Gohōbi); 85. "Ominous Clouds Gather" (立ちこめる妖雲, Tachikomeru Yōun); 86. "Divine Council" (神議, Kamuhakari); 87. "The Skies of Mato" (魔都上空, Mato Jōkū); 88. "Light of Hope" (光明, Kōmyō); 89. "The 1st Squad" (一番組, Ichi Bangumi); 90. "The High School Girl Commander" (女子高生組長, Joshikōsei Kumichō)
| 12 | January 4, 2023 | 978-4-08-883342-2 | September 9, 2025 | 978-1-9753-8803-4 |
91. "Raid" (襲撃, Shūgeki); 92. "Melee" (混戦, Konsen); 93. "Vested Power" (与えられし力, Ataerareshi Chikara); 94. "Path" (道, Michi); 95. "Honed Power" (練り上げた力, Neriageta Chikara); 96. "Commander of the 1st Squad" (一番組組長, Ichi Bangumi Kumichō); 97. "The Invaders" (侵攻する者達, Shinkō suru Monotachi); 98. "Kyouka and Yumeji" (京香と夢路, Kyōka to Yumeji)
| 13 | June 2, 2023 | 978-4-08-883494-8 | December 16, 2025 | 978-1-9753-8805-8 |
99. "The End of the Fierce Battle" (混戦の結末, Konsen no Ketsumatsu); 100. "The Elite Soldiers of Mato" (魔都の精兵たち, Mato no Seihei-tachi); 101. "Gods vs Ren" (神VS恋, Kami VS Ren); 102. "Earth's Answer" (地球の答え, Chikyū no Kotae); 103. "Demon Defense Force Personnel" (魔防隊人事, Mabōtai Jinji); 104. "Commander of the 3rd Squad" (三番組組長, San Bangumi Kumichō); 105. "Bell's Willpower" (ベルの意地, Beru no Iji); 106. "Bell's Tears" (ベルの涙, Beru no Namida)
| 14 | October 4, 2023 | 978-4-08-883636-2 | July 28, 2026 | 979-8-8554-0371-8 |
107. Tōgenkyō e (桃源郷へ); 108. Tōgenkyō (桃源郷); 109. Kumichō VS Kumichō VS Kumichō (組長VS組長VS組長); 110. Sorezore no Seichō (それぞれの成長); 111. "The Eighth Squad" (八番組, Hachi Bangumi); 112. "Varvara Pilipenko" (ワルワラ・ピリペンコ, Waruwara Piripenko); 113. Kansatsusha Fukuma (観察者伏摩); 114. An'un Tōgenkyō (暗雲桃源郷); 115. Raishin Tōgenkyō (雷震桃源郷)
| 15 | February 2, 2024 | 978-4-08-883829-8 | October 27, 2026 | 979-8-8554-0373-2 |
116. Shashin (写真); 117. Raijin Kagura (雷神楽); 118. Kiseki no Chikara (奇跡の力); 119. Seinaru Tatakai (聖なる戦い); 120. Hikari to Yami no Ketchaku (光と闇の決着); 121. Attō (圧倒); 122. Nana Bangumi no Iji (七番組の意地); 123. Hōkō no Sureibu (咆哮のスレイブ); 124. Chīsaki Mono (小さき者)
| 16 | July 4, 2024 | 978-4-08-884047-5 | January 26, 2027 | 979-8-8554-4712-5 |
125. Bell's Reward (ベルのご褒美, Beru no go Hōbi); 126. Kamigami no ie (神々の家); 127. Tōgen kyō Kōjitsu Dan (桃源鄉後日談); 128. Unlimited Power (無限の力, Mugen no Chikara); 129. Varvara's Slave (ワルワラのスレイブ, Waruwara no Sureibu); 130. "Confession" (告白, Kokuhaku); 131. Omoi Yueni (思いゆえに); 132. Igaina Kenen (意外な懸念); 133. Shirahata (白旗)
| 17 | December 4, 2024 | 978-4-08-884257-8 | — | — |
134. Kami no Teian (神の提案); 135. "Ren and Bell" (恋とベル, Ren to Beru); 136. Shōshū (招集); 137. Futatabi, Tōgenkyō e (再び、桃源鄉へ); 138. Haran no Shonichi (波乱の初日); 139. Onmyō ryō (陰陽寮); 140. Kumichō-tachi (組長たち); 141. Shuō hō (說法); 142. Ōshōbu (大勝負)
| 18 | April 4, 2025 | 978-4-08-884466-4 | — | — |
143. Jihi (慈悲); 144. Ren to no Taiketsu (恋との対決); 145. Karamiau Omowaku (絡み合う思惑); 146. Sekinin (責任); 147. Saigo no Itte (最後の一手); 148. Tōkaihyō (投開票); 149. Senkyo Ketchaku (選挙決着); 150. Yuruganu Seihei-tachi (揺るがぬ精兵たち); 151. Kawari Yuku Sūzei (変わりゆく趨勢)
| 19 | September 4, 2025 | 978-4-08-884622-4 | — | — |
152. Kue Haruno (久重遙乃); 153. Iyashi (癒やし); 154. Shidō (始動); 155. Taikyoku (大極); 156. Kamigakushi (神隠し); 157. Shin'iki e (神域へ); 158. Yomotsu Ōyama (黄泉津大山); 159. Kami Dorei (神奴隸); 160. Haha (母)
| 20 | January 5, 2026 | 978-4-08-884797-9 | — | — |
161. Kami no Chōai (神の寵愛); 162. Dasshutsu Keikaku (脫出計畫); 163. Juteki Tōsō (呪的逃走); 164. Tōsō no Hate (逃走の果て); 165. Kamigakushi Gojitsu-dan (神隠し後日談); 166. Yachiho no Ketsui (八千穂の決意); 167. Watashisama no Otōto (私様の弟); 168. Kawaranu Ketsui (変わらぬ決意); 169. Totsunyū Junbi (突入準備)
| 21 | June 4, 2026 | 978-4-08-885117-4 | — | — |
170. Kessen Mae (決戰前); 171. Kaimon (開門); 172. Gekisen Kaishi (激戰開始); 173. Sōryoku-sen (総力戦); 174. Wakagumo Mōkō (若雲猛攻); 175. Ezo Yagumo (蝦夷夜雲); 176. Chikara vs chikara (力 vs 力); 177. Seou Mono (背負うもの); 178. Kaihō (解放)
| 22 | November 4, 2026 | 978-4-08-885225-6 | — | — |
179. Tomeranu Shinka (とめらぬ進化); 180. Raitei Bankin (雷霆万鈞); 181. Kami no Nerai (神の狙い); 182. Iji no Ichigeki (意地の一撃); 183. Awasaru Chikara (合わさる力); 184. Raimeiryū (雷鳴竜); 185. Hai (拝); 186. Rokujin Gōryū (六神合流); 187. Kaihō Suru Omoi (解放する想い)

=== Anime ===
In November 2021, an anime television series adaptation was announced. It is produced by Seven Arcs and directed by Gorō Kuji, with Junji Nishimura serving as general director, Yasuhiro Nakanishi handling series composition, Ryota Kanō and Akira Kindaichi writing the scripts, Hiroyuki Yoshii designing the characters, and Kohta Yamamoto composing the music. The series was initially scheduled for 2023, but was later delayed, and eventually aired from January 4 to March 21, 2024, on AT-X and other networks. The opening theme song is "Yume no Ito" (夢の糸; "String of Dreams"), performed by Akari Kitō, while the ending theme song is "Chain", performed by Maaya Uchida.

Sentai Filmworks licensed and streams the series uncensored on Hidive. In June 2024, an English dub for the series was announced, which premiered on Hidive on July 29 of the same year. Muse Communication licensed the series in Asia-Pacific.

A second season was announced on March 23, 2024, two days after the airing of the first season's final episode. It is animated by Passione and Hayabusa Film, and directed by Masafumi Tamura, with Keiya Nakano replacing Yoshii as character designer. The season aired from January 8 to March 26, 2026. The opening theme song is "Hikari yo, Boku ni" (光よ、僕に。), performed by Kitō. The first ending theme song is "Cipher Cipher", performed by Kana Hanazawa, while the second ending theme song is "Love Love Beam" (LOVE LOVE ビーム), performed by Uchida.

A third season was announced during a special event for the anime series on August 2, 2026.

==== Episodes ====
===== Season 1 (2024) =====
| No. overall | No. in season | Title | Directed by | Written by | Storyboarded by | Chief animation directed by | Original release date |
|---|---|---|---|---|---|---|---|
| 1 | 1 | "Birth, Yuuki, Awakening"; Transliteration: "Tanjō, Yūki, Mezameru" (Japanese: 誕生、優希、目醒める) | Yuuta Takamura | Yasuhiro Nakanishi | Gorō Kuji | Hiroyuki Yoshii | January 4, 2024 |
Yuuki Wakura is a high school student who has had to live on his own after the mysterious disappearance of his sister many years ago. By sheer happenstance, he finds himself within the alternate dimension of Mato, where he is attacked by fearsome creatures called Shuuki. Yuuki is saved by the 7th squad of the JSDF's Mato Defense Force, led by Kyouka Uzen. Kyouka tells her subordinates, Himari, Shushu, and Nei, to look for other survivors while she protects Yuuki. However, the Shuuki she had enslaved and used for combat dies, until Kyouka gets the idea of using her Peach ability on Yuuki, who is suddenly transformed into a Shuuki-like monster. In this new form, Yuuki helps the 7th squad rescue other survivors. While the 7th squad evacuates the survivors, Kyouka gives Yuuki sexual pleasure as a reward for turning him into her slave, for that is the toll her Peach ability takes on her. She offers Yuuki the opportunity to join her squad, and he accepts, as he wants to become a hero and avenge his sister. Upon arriving at the 7th squad's dorm, however, Kyouka informs him that since men are not allowed to join the Mato Defense Force, he will only be able to contribute to the squad as a slave on the battlefield and as a caretaker within the dorm.
| 2 | 2 | "Curiosity, Shushu, Undress"; Transliteration: "Kyōmi, Shushu, Hadakeru" (Japanese: 興味、朱々、肌蹴る) | Kazunobu Fuseki | Yasuhiro Nakanishi | Gorō Kuji | Maki Hashimoto | January 11, 2024 |
Despite his best efforts to keep the dorm clean, Yuuki feels unsatisfied with his current duties, especially because Himari keeps antagonizing him and Shushu keeps taking photos of him for blackmail purposes. Nei explains that Mato is actually as big as the entire city of Tokyo, and that eight squads patrol it. She also says that she, Kyouka, and Himari will have to attend a meeting outside the dorm, so Yuuki and Shushu will be left in charge in their absence. Shushu, still showing some interest in Yuuki, challenges him to a video game. If she wins, he will become her slave; but if he wins, he will force her to delete the photos she took of him. Shushu wins and uses her Peach ability to take Yuuki's clothes off and take a look at his penis. Suddenly, a group of Shuuki attacks the dorm, and Shushu can only fight them for a while before the effects of her ability wear off. To help her, Yuuki begins touching and licking Kyouka's clothes to trigger a partial transformation, and he destroys the largest Shuuki in the dorm and saves Shushu. Sometime later, Kyouka penalizes Shushu for her recklessness by sentencing her to helping Yuuki with his housekeeping duties. Shushu, having developed feelings for Yuuki, continues teasing him and taking photos of him. Meanwhile, a mysterious female Shuuki attacks a squad of MDF forces soldiers and detects the presence of Yuuki within Mato.
| 3 | 3 | "Encounter, Kyouka, Rampage"; Transliteration: "Sōgū, Kyōka, Takeru" (Japanese: 遭遇、京香、猛る) | Yuuta Takamura | Yasuhiro Nakanishi | Gorō Kuji | Kie Kikuno | January 18, 2024 |
After going to the human realm and doing paperwork at the MDF's headquarters, Kyouka tells Yuuki her reasons for joining the MDF. Back when she was a child, her family and entire hometown were destroyed by a mysterious one-horned Shuuki that Kyouka has called the "Unihorn". Since then, she has promised to hunt down the Unihorn and avenge the loved ones she lost. Before returning to Mato, Yuuki convinces Kyouka to visit a cafe and enjoy the chance to relax. Once they return to Mato, the 7th squad is deployed to intercept a group of Shuuki led by the mysterious female Shuuki that has been attacking MDF soldiers recently. She also happens to be in command of the Unihorn, the appearance of which enrages Kyouka. During the battle, Yuuki and the female Shuuki seem to recognize each other, but the female Shuuki is forced to retreat when Kyouka violently attacks the Unihorn. Upon watching Yuuki trying to save Himari and Shushu, Kyouka realizes that the lives of their comrades are more important than her own need for revenge and orders a retreat. Upon returning to the dorm, Yuuki and Kyouka begin to suspect that the female Shuuki must be Yuuki's sister, Aoba. Still, before they can investigate any further, the 7th squad is visited by Tenka Izumo, commander of the 6th squad, and Yachiho, Himari's older sister.
| 4 | 4 | "Whirlwind, Himari, Roar"; Transliteration: "Senpuu, Himari, Hoeru" (Japanese: 旋風、日万凛、吠える) | Yoku Neruzō | Ryōta Kanō | Gorō Kuji | Issei Aragaki | January 25, 2024 |
Because Shuuki attacks have become more frequent, Tenka suggests an exhibition match between the squads as a form of training. Himari, anxious to beat Yachiho, asks Kyouka for permission to use Yuuki as her slave in her match, despite the physical toll it will take on her, and explains that her ability allows her to copy other people's abilities, including Kyouka's. With Himari as his master, Yuuki unlocks a new Slave form that enhances his speed but reduces his strength; while Himari learns that, whenever she uses Yuuki as her slave, she will have to give him pleasure the same way Kyouka does. As their training progresses, Yuuki and Himari grow closer, and Himari reveals that her family, the Azumas, is filled with highly prestigious members and overachievers like Yachiho. Himari constantly tried to live up to her family's reputation, but she came up short, something that Yachiho always teased her for. She also explains that Yachiho's ability allows her to stop and rewind time, meaning that Himari and Yuuki will have to come up with a plan to get around it. To make up for his reduced strength, Yuuki learns to concentrate his strength in a single body part whenever Himari is his master. Once the match begins, Yachiho immediately uses her ability to rewind time, but Yuuki and Himari had already planned for that.
| 5 | 5 | "Sisters, Yachiho, Ridicule"; Transliteration: "Shimai, Yachiho, Azakeru" (Japanese: 姉妹、八千穂、嘲る) | Yuuta Takamura | Ryōta Kanō | Shōta Ihata | Soji Ninomiya | February 1, 2024 |
Yuuki runs across the battlefield to trick Yachiho into constantly using her ability and exhausting herself. Once they are outside the range of Yachiho's ability, Himari tells Yuuki to attack her while Yachiho is vulnerable. However, Yachiho stops time for 10 seconds and shoots Yuuki and Himari with special bullets modified for usage within Mato. Yuuki inspires Himari to keep fighting; together, they trick Yachiho into leaving herself open to a gunshot from Himari, who is declared the winner. Once the combatants' injuries are healed, Yuuki and Himari go to their kitchen to rest and relax, but the price of using Yuuki as a slave causes Himari to kiss him, an event witnessed by Shushu, who is about to begin her match with Sahara Wakasa. Meanwhile, mysterious figures watch the exhibition match from a distance.
| 6 | 6 | "Blitz, Sahara, Twinkle"; Transliteration: "Kyōshū, Sahara, Kirameku" (Japanese: 強襲、サハラ、煌めく) | Kazunobu Fuseki | Akira Kindaichi | Kazunobu Fuseki | Hitoshi Tadano | February 8, 2024 |
The match between Shushu and Sahara begins. Shushu, wanting to impress Yuuki, attempts to beat Sahara without using her ability, but the longer the fight drags on, the combatants are forced to use their abilities. In her giant form, Shushu is stronger, but her attacks are easy to dodge; Sahara uses her ability to increase her speed and agility. Shushu stomps Sahara into the ground and knocks her unconscious, but this triggers a secondary ability of Sahara — if she gets knocked unconscious, her body will move on instinct and attack friends and foes alike. With this new power, Sahara beats Shushu, who is heartbroken that she did not impress Yuuki like Himari did. Yuuki attempts to console her, and Shushu uses the opportunity to steal a kiss from him. After Shushu and Sahara get their injuries treated, the 7th squad's dorm is attacked by an army of Shuuki, led by a humanoid known as Rairen. The MDF squads regroup and mount a defense. Kyouka and Himari enslave Yuuki at the same time, and Yuuki unlocks a new Slave form, while Yachiho fights Rairen on her own. Yachiho is left severely injured, but Tenka, having already obliterated a huge portion of the Shuuki army, rescues her and prepares to fight Rairen on her own.
| 7 | 7 | "United Front, Tenka, Soar"; Transliteration: "Kyōtō, Tenka, Kakeru" (Japanese: 共闘、天花、翔る) | Yuuta Takamura | Akira Kindaichi | Shina Kuzu | Erkin Kawabata | February 15, 2024 |
The 6th and 7th squadrons continue their fight against the Shuuki army, while Tenka faces Rairen on her own. Even without her ability, Tenka causes a small injury on Rairen's arm and opens a hole in the spacetime continuum to throw Rairen into it. With the Shuuki army defeated, the 6th and 7th squads agree to call off the exhibition match and investigate the humanoid Shuuki that led the attack. Having used Yuuki as their slave at the same time, Kyouka and Himari have to reward him. Sometime later, Yuuki, Kyouka, and Himari visit the 6th squad's dorm so that Kyouka and Tenka can plan their next move. Yuuki does the 6th squad's laundry and sees that, in their own way, Himari and Yachiho have grown closer as sisters. As their meeting concludes, Tenka asks Kyouka if she can keep Yuuki. Meanwhile, Rairen is about to be consumed by the hole opened by Tenka until she is rescued by Shikoku, another humanoid Shuuki who has been attacking MDF squads to measure their strength. Since the 6th and 7th squads proved stronger than she anticipated, Shikoku believes she and the other Shuuki should join forces to fight the MDF.
| 8 | 8 | "Promise, Nei, Remember"; Transliteration: "Yakusoku, Nei, Obou" (Japanese: 約束、寧、憶う) | Yi Cao | Yasuhiro Nakanishi | Shōta Ihata | Kie Kikuno | February 22, 2024 |
Tenka attempts to convince Kyouka to relinquish Yuuki to the 6th squad and says that she can recommend Kyouka to the position of supreme commander, but Kyouka declines the offer, both for her own feelings for Yuuki and because she wants to ascend to the position on her own merits. Tenka teleports into Yuuki's room and tries to seduce him, only to be caught by the 7th squad. Even with Kyouka rejecting her advances, Tenka refuses to give up on Yuuki, as she has fallen in love with him. The next day, Kyouka tries to test new transformations for Yuuki, with Nei and Shushu volunteering. With Nei as his master, Yuuki obtains X-ray vision and enhanced hearing, and Kyouka decides to reserve that form for scouting. With Shushu as his master, Yuuki's strength increases at the cost of his speed and mobility, and Kyouka decides that form is impractical, much to Shushu's disappointment. Later, as Nei prepares to go to school, Yuuki offers to go with her, and Nei reveals she joined the MDF to find her parents, who disappeared in a Mato mishap. Kyouka and Tenka have a conversation about the recent attacks by humanoid Shuuki and learn that the commanders are planning a gathering to discuss their next move. An army of modified Shuuki attacks the 7th squad's territory, but thanks to Tenka's ability, the 7th squad eliminates the enemy without too much trouble. Shikoku, having modified the Shuuki, has observed the battle from a distance and becomes more interested in humans.
| 9 | 9 | "Reunion, Koko, Lick"; Transliteration: "Saikai, Koko, Neburu" (Japanese: 再会、ココ、舐る) | Yuuta Takamura | Akira Kindaichi | Shina Kuzu | Kie Kikuno | February 29, 2024 |
Yuuki has become a respected member of the 7th squad, and Tenka's interest in him grows. Suddenly, Nei gets a vision of a human under attack by Shuuki, and the 7th squad deploys to defend her. Once they reach the victim, she reveals herself to be part of a trio of humanoid Shuuki who attack the 7th squad and kidnap Yuuki. While Himari tends to Shushu's injuries, Kyouka figures out that the ambush was simply a diversion to kidnap Yuuki, who is taken to a hidden village populated by humanoid Shuuki. There, Yuuki is attended by Aoba, who is finally revealed to be alive and a humanoid Shuuki, as well. She and her friends, Naon and Koko, reveal that despite their humanoid appearances, they still behave and think like humans. When Yuuki suggests that the humanoid Shuuki appeal their case to the MDF, they refuse, telling Yuuki that the MDF wouldn't consider them anything but enemies. Aoba does tell Yuuki about the Peaches from Mato, and Yuuki insists on hearing the whole story. Meanwhile, Kyouka's body begins reacting to Yuuki's presence within Mato, and she asks the 6th squad for help saving Yuuki.
| 10 | 10 | "War, Naon, Recite"; Transliteration: "Kaisen, Naon, Utau" (Japanese: 開戦、波音、詠う) | Kazunobu Fuseki | Yasuhiro Nakanishi | Kazunobu Fuseki | Maki Hashimoto | March 7, 2024 |
Aoba and her friends explain to Yuuki that they became humanoid Shuuki after consuming the Peaches of Mato and getting exposed to Mato's miasma. Koko and Naon were captured by a secret branch of the MDF that performed unethical experiments on humans mutated by the Peaches, but they managed to escape and met Aoba, who had secluded herself in a cave and worked hard for years to retain her human intellect. They plan to attack the MDF using wild Shuuki they had domesticated, including the Unihorn that had previously killed Kyouka's family. Suddenly, the 6th and 7th squads have tracked Yuuki down to the cave used by the humanoid Shuuki as a hideout and begin their rescue operation. They split into multiple teams: Shushu and Sahara facing Koko, and Himari and Yachiho facing Naon. Kyouka and Tenka catch up to Aoba, but Yuuki attempts to defuse the situation by explaining what happened to Aoba and her friends. Although the MDF captains offer a peaceful solution, Aoba still wants revenge for her friends, and a fight begins. Meanwhile, Shikoku and her faction of humanoid Shuuki become aware of the fight at the caves and prepare to move out.
| 11 | 11 | "Death Match, Aoba, Excite"; Transliteration: "Shitō, Aoba, Takaburu" (Japanese: 死闘、青羽、昂る) | Yuuta Takamura | Yasuhiro Nakanishi | Masahiro Aizawa | Ken'ichi Hirata | March 14, 2024 |
While Kyouka fights the Unihorn, Tenka keeps Aoba distracted with her portals. Aoba consumes as many Peaches as she can, forcing Tenka to engage in a sustained battle. On the outside, Koko and her pet Shuuki keep Shushu and Sahara on the defensive. To beat them, Shushu shrinks down to a very small size and throws herself into the Shuuki's mouth. Deep inside the beast's stomach, Shushu grows gigantic, tearing the beast apart from the inside, and Sahara uses one of the Shuuki's teeth to stab Koko. Meanwhile, deeper in the caves, Yachiho realizes that Naon and her Shuuki have been targeting Himari all along. Hence, she exhausts her energy trying to protect Himari until Himari realizes what Yachiho has been doing. To draw Naon out of hiding, Himari fires her guns in multiple directions and incapacitates the enemies while Yachiho shoots them with special bullets. Tenka baits Aoba into attacking the Unihorn and leaving herself exposed, but ultimately decides not to attack her, which allows Aoba to inflict damage on her. As the two enemy forces converge, they are ambushed by Shikoku's faction, the Eight Thunder Gods. Since they have no allegiance to other humanoid Shuuki, Shikoku brainwashes the Unihorn into attacking everyone present, but Yuuki and Kyouka step in to fight it.
| 12 | 12 | "Homecoming, New, Resolve"; Transliteration: "Kikan, Aratana, Ketsui" (Japanese: 帰還、新たな、決意) | Yoku Neruzō | Yasuhiro Nakanishi | Gorō Kuji | Hiroyuki Yoshii | March 21, 2024 |
The battle at the caverns continues, and the Unihorn mutates into a second, even stronger form. Still, Yuuki breaks its horn with his mouth and restrains it with his chains, giving Kyouka enough time to kill it. With the Unihorn dead, Kyouka finally gets closure for the destruction of her hometown, but Shikoku and Jouryuu retreat, having kidnapped Koko and Naon. While Tenka evacuates the injured back to the MDF's headquarters, Kyouka promises Aoba that she will become Supreme Commander of the MDF so that victims like Aoba will no longer suffer prosecution from the Onmyou Bureau, the secret organization that conducted illegal experiments on Shuuki. Aoba decides that she and her fellow humanoid Shuuki will stay hidden and avoid detection from Yamashiro, the MDF's current Supreme Commander and chief of the 10th unit. Shikoku takes Koko and Naon to her fortress and feeds them to a mysterious beast. Back at the 7th squad's dorm, Yuuki and his friends celebrate their victory with a party and continue their fight against the Shuuki.

===== Season 2 (2026) =====
| No. overall | No. in season | Title | Directed by | Written by | Storyboarded by | Chief animation directed by | Original release date |
|---|---|---|---|---|---|---|---|
| 13 | 1 | "Commander Meeting"; Transliteration: "Kumichō Kaigi" (Japanese: 組長会議) | Masafumi Tamura | Yasuhiro Nakanishi | Masafumi Tamura | Keiya Nakano, Shinya Hashizume & Isamu Fukushima | January 8, 2026 |
Yuuki's life with the 7th squad continues. Tenka delivers supplies to Aoba and her colony of humanoid Shuuki while the 6th and 7th squads work in a joint operation. Later, as Yuuki prepares for a training session with Kyouka, both are called to a meeting at the Supreme Commander's headquarters. Once they attend, they find that commanders from all the other squads have joined, including Mira, a personal rival of Kyouka for the position of Supreme Commander; Fubuki, commander of the 9th squad and mother of Himari and Yachiyo; and Ren, commander of the 10th squad as well as the current Supreme Commander, who has no interest in stepping down. The commanders are devising a strategy to defeat the Eight Thunder Gods, with Kyouka suggesting an offensive while Ren proposes a defensive approach. The meeting is interrupted by a group of Shuuki who invade Ren's headquarters, but the gathered commanders defeat them, while Ren discovers the supposed masterminds behind the attack: a group of foreign terrorists. With her ability, which grants her infinite knowledge of the cosmos, Ren kills the terrorists before they can even fight back.
| 14 | 2 | "Ren's Shadow"; Transliteration: "Ren no Kage" (Japanese: 恋の影) | Takahide Ejiri | Ohine Ezaki | Masafumi Tamura | Keiya Nakano, Shinya Hashizume & Isamu Fukushima | January 15, 2026 |
After killing the terrorists, Ren takes a huge interest in Yuuki, but in a way of making him her pet. Kyouka then further explains to him that she loves dogs which is what she thinks of him. That night, Shushu attempts to flirt with Yuuki while he is asleep, but is interrupted when Shikoku, having snuck through the barrier, attempts to abduct him. Shushu, with help from Tenka, who also had the same idea, fend Shikoku off forcing her to flee. Yuuki, having not heard the fight in his sleep, wakes up and thanks Tenka, but she credits Shushu, which makes her feel proud. The 7th squadron is forced to sleep together as a result for the rest of the night. Nei and Yuuki conduct a scouting mission the following day, during which they encounter Ren, who has been watching them from above. Ren attempts to borrow Yuuki, but Kyouka refuses excusing the consequences of multiple users. Kyouka then punishes Yuuki, warning him that he could be used as a plaything for the other commanders if word gets out. The 5th, 6th, and 7th squadrons meet up to conduct a training session.
| 15 | 3 | "A Storm Rolls In"; Transliteration: "Yattekita Arashi" (Japanese: やってきた嵐) | Yūta Kida | Kyōta Kanō | Masafumi Tamura | Shinya Hashizume & Isamu Fukushima | January 22, 2026 |
The 5th, 6th, and 7th squads perform a joint training exercise at the 7th squad's dorm, and once the exercise is finished, Kyouka reluctantly lends her ability to Yakumo Ezo, the 5th squad's commander. With Yakumo as his master, Yuuki assumes a winged form capable of flying at supersonic speeds. Yuuki traverses a large portion of Mato and destroys a horde of Shuuki before they can even see him. As Yakumo rewards Yuuki, she reveals that she joined the demon defense force to pay for her younger sisters' tuition and that her dream is to form a harem with the squad captains, including Kyouka and Tenka, and offers Yuuki the chance to join. Later, as the 5th and 6th squads return home, Yuuki learns that the 7th squad will be conducting joint training exercises with other squads, including Ren's.
| 16 | 4 | "Rampage"; Transliteration: "Bōsō" (Japanese: 暴走) | Masafumi Tamura | Takahiro Nagase | Masafumi Tamura | Keiya Nakano & Isamu Fukushima | January 29, 2026 |
Yuuki and Kyouka arrive at Ren's dorm, which is adorned with a Japanese garden. Ren requests to be Yuuki's master, and Kyouka reluctantly agrees. Under Ren's leadership, Yuuki assumes a dark, violent form, and Ren makes him go against an entire army of Shuuki. Yuuki viciously defeats the Shuuki with instant kill attacks, but turns on Ren after doing so, who has to use her ability to defeat Yuuki and force him back into his human form. Then, Kyouka's ability forces Ren to reward Yuuki who tries to override it with her ability. She fails and is forced to act as a dog much to her displeasure. After returning Yuuki to Kyouka, Ren crashes out on her way back vowing revenge on him for this supposed humiliation. Kyouka tells Yuuki to rest, and when Ren requests Yuuki's presence at the next meeting of commanders, Kyouka deliberately declines to bring him, both to protect Yuuki from Ren and to hide her own frustration at lending Yuuki to other commanders. After the meeting, Fubuki goes to the 7th squad's dorm and informs Himari that the Azuma Banquet, a ceremony that will decide the family's next head, will be held soon. Himari is reluctant to go, only agreeing after being provoked by Fubuki.
| 17 | 5 | "The Azuma Banquet"; Transliteration: "Azuma no Bansan" (Japanese: 東の晩餐) | Masaru Kawashima | Takahiro Nagase | Masafumi Tamura | Shinya Hashizume | February 5, 2026 |
Yuuki and his friends arrive at the Azuma estate, where they are received by Tovera, the current head of the family. The battle takes place on a deserted island, and Yuuki is allowed to participate as Himari's assistant, while Kyouka, Tenka, and Maia watch the banquet from the estate. Yuuki and Himari confront Homare, a particularly violent Azuma who enjoyed bullying Himari when they were children; while Fubuki defeats a trio of secondary Azuma with the arrival of Maia, her eldest daughter. Although Homare keeps Yuuki and Himari on the ropes with her ability, Python, which enhances her physicality by programming her body with special movements, they defeat her. With the first phase of the battle over, Himari kisses Yuuki, only to be interrupted by Fubuki.
| 18 | 6 | "A New Azuma"; Transliteration: "Aratanaru Azuma" (Japanese: 新たなる東) | Hiroki Moritomo | Ohine Ezaki | Masafumi Tamura | Isamu Fukushima | February 12, 2026 |
Yuuki and Himari fight against Fubuki, who easily defeats Yuuki with just a fraction of her power. Himari attacks Fubuki by combing close quarters combat with weapons generated from her ability, but that fails, as Fubuki's ability grants her almost impenetrable protection. Fubuki says that Himari's unworthiness will bring nothing but shame not just to the Azuma family but to the 7th squad, as well. This angers Himari to the point of pushing her ability beyond its limits and becoming capable of using the abilities of Yakumo and Tenka at the same time. However, this new power exhausts Himari too quickly and she passes out. Fubuki becomes the new matriarch of the Azumas and admits that Himari has earned her respect. She also dismantles the harsh, overly competitive discipine Tovera has imposed on the family and says that the family will now be more lenient and permissive with its members.
| 19 | 7 | "Late Summer Slave"; Transliteration: "Sureibu no Banka" (Japanese: スレイブの晩夏) | Ippei Ichii | Yasuhiro Nakanishi | Masafumi Tamura | Isamu Fukushima | February 19, 2026 |
Back on the deserted island Fubuki borrows Yuuki who assumes a very flexible form allowing him to take hits with ease. The 7th squadron takes the day off hanging out at the beach with Tenka tagging along. Shushu eager to get with Yuuki tries many attempts to flirt with him throughout the day, but fails. She tries again when Yuuki watches the sunset, and is flustered when called cute by him, but before she can make a move, he is sent to practice with Kyouka. While practicing Kyouka notes that lending him to others makes his slave form stronger, however when Yuuki agrees, she becomes resentful. This fear further increases when Kyouka has a nightmare about the other commanders using Yuuki uncontrollably. She finds him working out on the beach in the middle of the night where Yuuki regrets what he said confessing he would rather work alongside Kyouka. Kyouka vows to try more ways get stronger as a team, but they are called back to Mato with the Eight Thunder Gods making a move.
| 20 | 8 | "The Commander of the 2nd Squadron"; Transliteration: "Ni Bangumi Kumichō" (Japanese: 二番組 組長) | Yuta Kita | Kyōta Kanō | Masafumi Tamura | Shinya Hashizume & Isamu Fukushima | February 26, 2026 |
The DDF commanders are summoned to Ren's dorm while Ren briefs them from Washington about a series of disappearances in Yokohama, believed to be caused by one of the Thunder Gods. Yuuki, Kyouka and the 2nd squadron commander Mira are sent to investigate the disappearances in Yokohoma. They find the mansion in which the victims are being held at and Mira defeats the Shuuki patrolling the place using her ability, which allows her to create copies of herself. Mira begins to question Kyouka and Yuukis relationship when she sees her reward him. Yuuki rests in a hotel, but the culprit ambushes and paralyzes him with a feather. She reveals herself as Kuusetsu, one of the Eight Thunder Gods. Interested, she controls Yuuki and begins to force him into having sex.
| 21 | 9 | "The Commander's Resolve"; Transliteration: "Kumichō no Kakugo" (Japanese: 組長の覚悟) | Takahide Ejiri | Ohine Ezaki | Masafumi Tamura | Keiya Nakano | March 5, 2026 |
As Kuusetsu begins sexually assaulting Yuuki, his paralysis wears off and Yuuki is able to call for help. Mira attacks Kuusetsu, who summons an army of Shuuki to destroy the city and cover her escape. Mira creates an army of clones to destroy the Shuuki and provokes Kuusetsu into staying in the battle. Despite her physical disadvantage, Mira tricks Kuusetsu into attacking clones and forces her to assume a new form. Yuuki reunites with Kyouka and they try to reach Mira, only to find that Kuusetsu has absorbed her.
| 22 | 10 | "Yokohama Showdown"; Transliteration: "Yokohama Kessen" (Japanese: 横浜決戦) | Ippei Ichii & Takahide Ejiri | Takahiro Nagase | Masafumi Tamura | Keiya Nakano & Isamu Fukushima | March 12, 2026 |
Horrifed by Mira's fate, Yuuki and Kyouka attack Kuusetsu, who has assimilated Mira's ability and summoned a giant Shuuki to destroy Yokohoma. Luckily, Yuuki and Kyouka receive assitance from Tenka, Maia, Tovera and even Aoba to defeat Kuusetu's army. Maia leads Kuusetsu's army to trap in which Tovera drains their life force, while Ren releases an energy beam from Washington to destroy Kuusetsu's giant Shuuki. However, Kuusetsu herself survives a combined assault from Yuuki, Kyouka, Tenka and Aoba, forcing Yuuki to activate his Heavenward form.
| 23 | 11 | "Slave: Heaven"; Transliteration: "Mukyū no Kusari Ten" (Japanese: 無窮の鎖 天) | Masafumi Tamura | Kyōta Kanō | Masafumi Tamura | Keiya Nakano & Isamu Fukushima | March 19, 2026 |
With the Heavenward form, Yuuki and Kyouka are able to keep Kuusetsu on the defensive while Tenka, Tovera and Maia continue destroying Kuusetsu's remaining clones. Aoba provides a distraction for Yuuki and Kyouka to land hits on Kuusetsu, who realizes that Mira has gained control of one of her clones and is trying to escape from her body. Yuuki and Kyouka use their completed technique to rescue Kuusetsu's victims and reduce Kuusetsu to her cocoon form. Using the last of her strength, Kuusetsu attempts to absorb Kyouka but Kyouka destroys her. With the battle finished, Tenka lets Aoba escape with her friends while Kyouka tends to the wounded Mira. Yuuki collapses from exhaustion and finds that Kuusetsu is now present within his mind because she forced him to drink her nectar. Having developed a form of affection for Yuuki, Kuusetsu decides to remain passive and see how Yuuki develops in the coming days. Two days after the battle, Yuuki awakens in the 7th squad's dorm and comments to Kyouka and Tenka about Kuusetsu. Later, the recovered Mira asks Kyouka to borrow Yuuki.
| 24 | 12 | "Gods Assemble"; Transliteration: "Kamuhakari" (Japanese: 神議) | Hiroki Moritomo | Yasuhiro Nakanishi | Masafumi Tamura | Isamu Fukushima | March 26, 2026 |
With Mira as his master, Yuuki assumes the form of a motorcycle and runs over a horde of Shuuki. Yuuki and Mira travel to her dorm, where she rewards Yuuki despite her own inexperience with the opposite gender. Later, with Tenka's help, Yuuki is able to reunite with Aoba, Naon and Koko. Tenka informs that for now, the MDF is focused on hunting down the Eight Thunder Gods, but she should move her fellow her fellow humanoid Shuuki to another location. In another part of Mato, the Eight Thunder Gods hold a meeting to discuss their next move after Kuusetsu's loss. Shikoku is harshly punished for getting a Thunder God killed, but otherwise allowed to suggest a plan in which the Thunder Gods will continue attempting to bolster their ranks against the MDF. The Thunder Gods also send out their Holy Tributes, humans who have pledged allegiance to them, to keep the MDF distracted. The MDF's commanders hold a meeting and Ren decides to reveal the Thunder Gods' existence to the public and declare a state of emergency. Kyouka also agrees to continue lending Yuuki to other members of the MDF, including those of her own squad, if it helps Yuuki getting stronger, but Yuuki replies that, whatever happens, he will always consider Kyouka his partner. Later, while Kyouka visits another squad, Ren decides to visit the 7th squad's dorm and Yuuki does his best to keep her happy, only for Ren to attempt to discipline him the same way she would discipline a dog. This, however, does not satisfy Ren, for she still feels humilliated for the way she had to reward Yuuki after he was briefly her slave and she promises to continue watching Yuuki.

== Reception ==
By November 2021, the manga had over 1 million copies in circulation. By January 2024, when the anime's first season aired, it had over 2 million copies in circulation. By June 2025, it had over 5.5 million copies in circulation. By August 2026, it had over 6.8 million copies in circulation.

== See also ==
- Listen to Me, Girls. I Am Your Father!, a light novel series with a manga adaptation illustrated by Yohei Takemura
