= Yoshiteru =

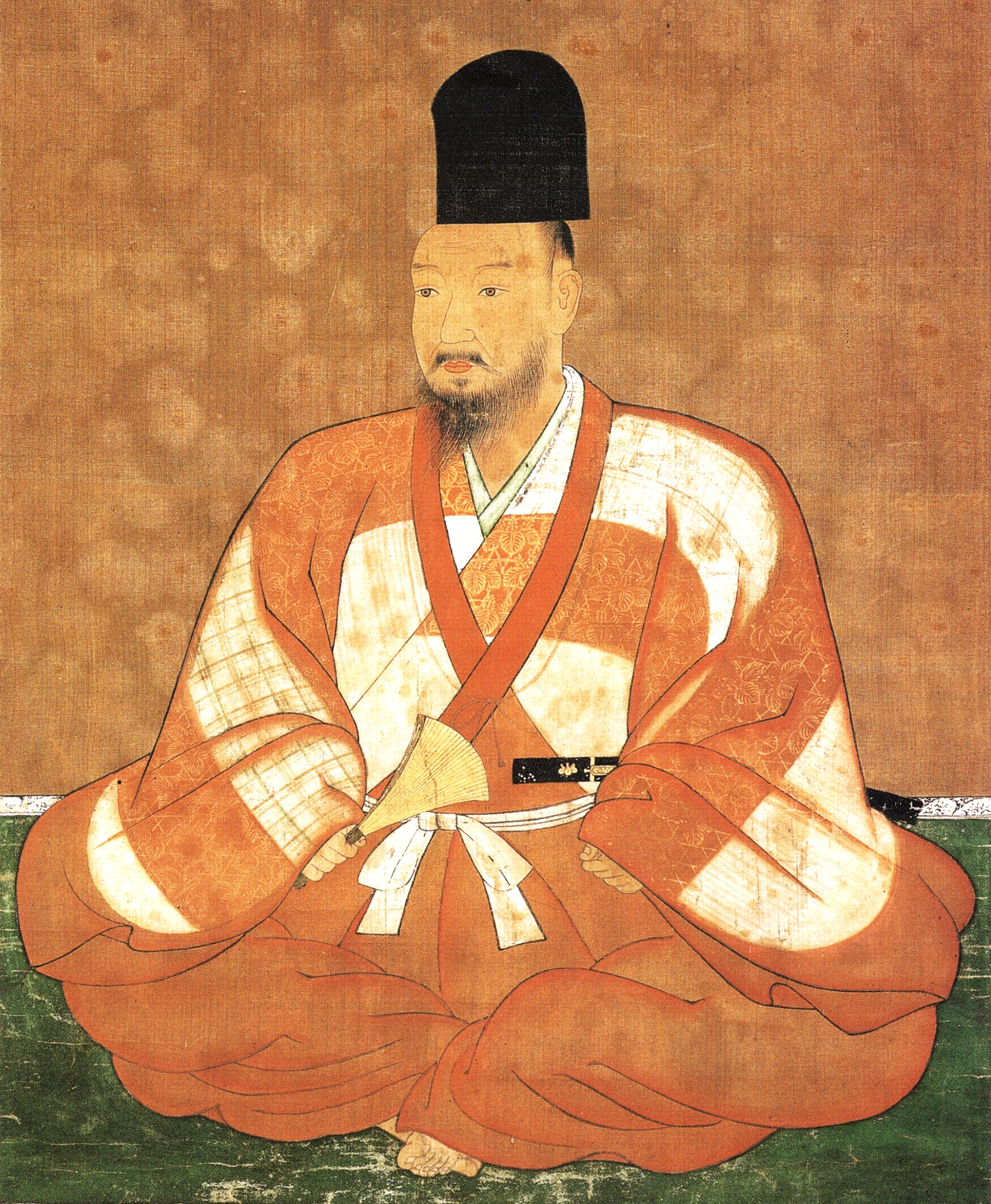
- Yoshiteru Ashikaga (1536–1565), Japanese shogun
- Pronunciation: joɕiteɾɯ (IPA)
- Gender: Male

Origin
- Origin: Japanese
- Meaning: Different meanings depending on the kanji used

Other names
- Alternative spelling: Yositeru (Kunrei-shiki) Yositeru (Nihon-shiki) Yoshiteru (Hepburn)

Yoshiteru is a masculine Japanese given name.

== Written forms ==
Yoshiteru can be written using different combinations of kanji characters. Here are some examples:

- 義輝, "justice, sparkle"
- 義照, "justice, illuminate"
- 義央, "justice, center"
- 吉輝, "good luck, sparkle"
- 吉照, "good luck, illuminate"
- 吉央, "good luck, center"
- 善輝, "virtuous, sparkle"
- 善照, "virtuous, illuminate"
- 善央, "virtuous, center"
- 芳輝, "virtuous, sparkle"
- 芳照, "virtuous/fragrant, illuminate"
- 芳央, "virtuous/fragrant, center"
- 好照, "good/like something, illuminate"
- 慶輝, "congratulate, preserve"
- 慶照, "congratulate, illuminate"
- 慶央, "congratulate, center"
- 由照, "reason, illuminate"
- 由輝, "reason, sparkle"

The name can also be written in hiragana よしてる or katakana ヨシテル.

== Notable people with the name ==
- Yoshiteru Abe (安倍 吉輝; 1941–2009), Japanese Go player
- Yoshiteru Asano (浅野 慶熾; 1836–1858), Japanese daimyō
- Yoshiteru Ashikaga (足利 義輝, 1536–1565), Japanese shōgun
- Yoshiteru Hirobe (廣部 好輝; born 1982), Japanese badminton player
- Yoshiteru Morishita (森下 由輝; born 1971), Japanese long-distance runner
- Yoshiteru Otani (大谷 芳照; born 1958), Japanese artist
- Yoshiteru Suzuki (鈴木 善照; born 1909), Japanese rower
- Yoshiteru Yamashita (山下 芳輝; born 1977), Japanese footballer
