= Release the Spyce =

Japanese anime television series

- Promotional image
- Manga

Release the Spyce: Naisho no Mission
- Illustrated by: Meia Mitsuki
- Published by: ASCII Media Works
- Magazine: Dengeki G's Comic
- Original run: January 30, 2018 – December 30, 2018
- Volumes: 2
- Serial novel

Release the Spyce: Golden Genesis
- Published by: ASCII Media Works
- Magazine: Dengeki G's Magazine (Dengeki G's Novel)
- Original run: February 27, 2018 – November 30, 2018
- Volumes: 1
- Anime television series
- Directed by: Akira Sato
- Written by: Takahiro
- Music by: Ryouhei Sataka
- Studio: Lay-duce
- Licensed by: BI: MVM Entertainment; NA: Sentai Filmworks
- Original network: MBS, Tokyo MX, BS11, AT-X
- Original run: October 7, 2018 – December 23, 2018
- Episodes: 12
- icon

Release the Spyce (stylized in all caps) is a Japanese anime television series created by Sorasaki F., Takahiro, and Namori, produced by ASCII Media Works and animated by Lay-duce. The series aired in Japan from October to December 2018. A manga and a serial novel were published by ASCII Media Works.

== Plot ==
The series follows Tsukikage, a group of female high school spies who gain power from spices and secretly fight against crime syndicates to protect the city of Sorasaki. Momo Minamoto, a girl with heightened senses and deductive abilities, is recruited to join Tsukikage and train under fellow member Yuki Hanzōmon. Together, Tsukikage battles against the female crime syndicate Moryo.

== Characters ==
=== Tsukikage ===
Momo Minamoto (源 モモ, Minamoto Momo) / Momochi (百地)
Voiced by: Yukari Anzai (Japanese); Juliet Simmons (English)
The main protagonist serving as a second-year student at Sorasaki High School, Momo wishes to protect her hometown like her late police officer father did. She becomes Yuki's apprentice before becoming a full-fledged member of Tsukikage. She has powerful eyesight, a strong sense of smell, and can identify a person's physical condition by licking them.
Yuki Hanzōmon (半蔵門 雪, Hanzōmon Yuki) / Hanzō (半蔵)
Voiced by: Manami Numakura (Japanese); Kira Vincent-Davis (English)
Serving as the leader of Tsukikage, Yuki is a third-year student who is Momo's mentor. She lost her right eye during a mission two years prior to the events of the series. At the end of the series, she leaves Tsukikage and her memory is erased, although the last scene implies that she kept her memories.
Fū Sagami (相模 楓, Sagami Fū) / Fūma (風魔)
Voiced by: Akane Fujita (Japanese); Christina Kelly (English)
Fū is a first-year student and Mei's apprentice, who acts jealous towards those who get close to Mei. She works at a maid café in order to support her family.
Mei Yachiyo (八千代 命, Yachiyo Mei) / Chiyome (千代女)
Voiced by: Aya Suzaki (Japanese); Cat Thomas (English)
A second-year student in Momo's class, Mei is a cheerful Tsukikage spy and Fū's mentor. She plays the guitar and holds street performances in order to gather intelligence. She is later revealed to be working under Moryo, in which she leaked Tsukikage personal information to the Moryo and betrayed her teammates. However, it is then revealed that she was actually serving as a triple agent to obtain Moryo's trust and then destroy them from the inside.
Goe Ishikawa (石川 五恵, Ishikawa Goe) / Goemon (五右衛門)
Voiced by: Yuri Noguchi (Japanese); Avery Smithhart (English)
Goe is Momo's classmate and Hatsume's apprentice, who likes animals and plushies. She was once briefly brainwashed, although she was able to return to normal.
Hatsume Aoba (青葉 初芽, Aoba Hatsume) / Tsubone (局)
Voiced by: Aya Uchida (Japanese); Skyler Sinclair (English)
Yuki's childhood friend and Goe's mentor, Hatsume is responsible for developing the various gadgets Tsukikage use during their missions.
Katrina Toby (カトリーナ・トビー, Katorīna Tobī)
Voiced by: Mikako Komatsu (Japanese); Olivia Swasey (English)
Manager of the curry restaurant and café called Wasabi used as a front for Tsukikage's underground secret base, Katrina is a former Tsukikage spy who retired after becoming too old to use the Spyce that they use.

=== Moryo ===
Kurara Tendō (天堂 久良羅, Tendō Kurara) / Sparrow Woman (文鳥の女, Bunchō no Onna)
Voiced by: Shizuka Itō (Japanese); Joanne Bonasso (English)
The main antagonist who serves as the leader of Moryo, she gives her mercenaries jelly drinks to energize them, as well as wipe their memories when they fail their missions.
Theresia Ray (テレジア・レイ, Tereshia Rei)
Voiced by: Risa Taneda (Japanese); Shanae'a Moore (English)
Theresia is a silver-haired girl who was kidnapped and sold to Moryo as a child. She was once friends with Hatsume who was kidnapped alongside her, but was led to assume she had abandoned her when she was the only one who was rescued.
Byakko (白虎)
Voiced by: Aina Suzuki (Japanese); Brittney Karbowski (English)
Byakko is a girl with great strength despite her childlike appearance. After she is captured by Tsukikage, her memories are wiped and she begins working in Tsukikage's secret base.
Dolte (ドルテ, Dorute)
Voiced by: Saori Hayami (Japanese); Patricia Duran (English)
A mercenary working for Moryo, Dolte is a muscular woman who, when powered up, becomes almost impervious to pain and can track anyone by their scent.

== Media ==
=== Print media ===
A manga adaptation titled Release the Spyce: Naisho no Mission (RELEASE THE SPYCE ないしょのミッション, Release the Spyce: Naisho no Misshon) and illustrated by Meia Mitsuki began serialization in the March 2018 issue of Dengeki G's Comic on January 30, 2018, while a serial novel adaptation titled Release the Spyce: Golden Genesis was released in the March 2018 issue of Dengeki G's Novel as an appendix for the Dengeki G's Magazine on February 27, 2018.

=== Anime ===
The series was directed by Akira Sato and features a concept written by Takahiro and original character designs by Namori. It was animated by Lay-duce and aired in Japan from October 7 to December 23, 2018. (Note: MBS listed the series premiere at 26:38 on October 6, 2018, which is on October 7 at 2:38 a.m.) The opening and ending themes, respectively, are "Supatto! Spy & Spice" (スパッと！スパイ&スパイス, Supatto! Supai ando Supaisu) and "Hide & Seek", both performed by Tsukikage (Yukari Anzai, Manami Numakura, Aya Suzaki, Akane Fujita, Aya Uchida, and Yuri Noguchi). Sentai Filmworks has licensed the series and streamed it on Hidive. An English dub has also been produced for the series. The series ran for 12 episodes.

No.	Title (Note: All English episode titles are taken from Hidive.)	Directed by	Written by	Original release date	Ref.
1	"Golden Spirits" "Gōruden Supirittsu" (ゴールデンスピリッツ)	Akira Sato	Takahiro	October 7, 2018	
A female spy organization known as Tsukikage conducts a mission at night to steal confidential data from a factory, using the power of spices to increase their abilities. Meanwhile, Momo Minamoto sees silhouetted figures that look like ninjas from afar. The next day at Sorasaki High School, Momo befriends Mei Yachiyo and Goe Ishikawa. They invite her after school to a curry restaurant and café called Wasabi, where Momo demonstrates her ability to identify someone's physical condition by licking them. Worried that her police officer friend Ayumu Arakaki has not gotten back from her patrol in Ogimachi, Momo bikes to the docks at night, soon discovering that Ayumu has been captured by some female thugs. Upon getting caught while trying to lure away the female thugs, Momo is rescued by Tsukikage, of which Mei and Goe are two of its members. Brought along to witness Tsukikage catch the female thugs during a vehicle pursuit, Momo is noticed for her talents and is recruited to become a potential member of Tsukikage. Elsewhere, a female crime syndicate known as Moryo plans to crush Tsukikage using intelligence from a supposed mole there.
2	"First Challenge" "Dai Ichi no Chōsen" (第1の挑戦)	Yōko Fukushima	Takahiro	October 14, 2018	
Katrina Toby, manager of Wasabi and retired member of Tsukikage, takes Momo to an underground secret base of Tsukikage. Aside from all the cool gadgets displayed, Momo learns how the members of Tsukikage consume Spyce to temporarily give them superhuman agility. Momo is assigned as the apprentice of her mentor Yuki Hanzōmon, who subjects Momo to various social trials to test her readiness as a spy, including one where Fū Sagami disguises herself as Yuki and serves distasteful tea to Momo. Despite the physical training being very tough, Momo eventually becomes motivated when Hatsume Aoba mentions that Yuki wears wrist and ankle weights during her kendo exercises. Meanwhile, Fū, Mei, Goe and Hatsume decrypt a portion of the confidential data, which is the blueprint of a building called "Project Gekkako". As Momo begins to make great progress in her training, she is tasked by Goe with playing a game of tag against Mei before the end of class. Momo manages to capture Mei by luring her into a makeshift barricade at a stairwell, thereby making Momo an official member of Tsukikage.
3	"Moryo" "Mōryō" (モウリョウ)	Ryō Miyata; Takuma Suzuki	Takahiro	October 21, 2018	TBA
As Tsukikage investigates a drug smuggling operation connected to Moryo, Momo unintentionally slips up during a mission at a restaurant kitchen and a bicycle race track, greatly disappointing Yuki in both occasions. Both Goe and Fū encourage Momo to think before she acts. Tsukikage then infiltrate a brothel and obtain a name list of women who were drugged and forced to work there, though Momo slips up yet again during the mission. While the mentors have a meeting at Wasabi, the apprentices have a meeting at a maid café where Fū works part-time. Tsukikage later raid the harbor at night in hopes of thwarting the drug smuggling operation. However, they are ambushed by a member of Moryo named Byakko, who surrounds Yuki, Mae and Hatsume with numerous robots. Momo, Goe and Fū collectively work together to defeat and capture Byakko. Before Tsukikage can milk any information out of her, Byakko experiences amnesia after having been previously rewarded with a jello shot from the leader of Moryo named Kurara Tendō. Despite this, Tsukikage manage to find some leads, while Yuki finally praises Momo for her efforts.
4	"Never Say Never Together"	Takashi Kumazen	Aoi Akashiro	October 28, 2018	TBA
Momo and Goe learn that Mei plays the guitar as a street performer. Moreover, Fū and Mei currently live together at an apartment. Tsukikage is briefed that a drug dealing incident occurring in Kyuten is being investigated by the police. Ignoring Mei's advice, Fū takes it upon herself to gather intel on her own. After tailing a masochistic drug supplier named Joji, Fū loses track of him when she is spotted by Yuki, Mei and Hatsume. Fū has a falling-out with Mei, affecting her performance at work in the maid café. Mei ends up protecting Fū from injury during a mission to steal materials containing proof of illicit behavior from influential assembly members. After Fū temporarily leaves the apartment to visit her mother and older sister, both Fū and Mei reminisce about how they first met each other. Later gifting Mei with a new guitar pick, Fū reveals that she just wanted Mei's approval, though Mei implores Fū not to push herself too hard. After they reconcile, Fū and Mei chase after Joji in the streets, implementing a coordinated attack of offense and defense to defeat him at a railroad.
5	"Phantom Protocol"	Norihiko Nagahama	Takahiro	November 4, 2018	TBA
Tsukikage does not find any clues tied to Moryo upon infiltrating a facility called Kyuten Science and extracting data from its server room. Yuki grows concerned when Momo focuses too much on her training. Byakko is shown as a housekeeper against her will for Tsukikage. Fū and Mei gather intel by tailing a drug dealer named Marco Nero. Momo and Yuki follow Marco on a train, where Momo plants a transmitter and listening device on Marco. Suddenly, Momo is attacked by a member of Moryo named Dolte, who proves to be impervious to pain. Yuki manages to save Momo by kicking Dolte into the river below. During a briefing, it is learned that Marco is working for Emo Pacino, the boss of an Italian syndicate under the umbrella of Moryo. Momo decides to use her day off to celebrate her birthday with her classmates Yua Hakakeyama and Nagi Hokuto. Tsukikage later successfully infiltrates Emo's seashore hideout, though Emo makes a run for it. Back at Wasabi, Dolte tracks down Momo from her scent, though Katrina and Yuki manage to save Momo. Having watched over Momo after she passed out, Yuki is led to suspect that Kyuten Science may still be tied to Moryo.
6	"The Rewards of Friendship" "Tomodachi no Hōshū" (友達の報酬)	Hazuki Mizumoto	Aoi Akashiro	November 11, 2018	TBA
Upon learning from the mole that Hatsume is a member of Tsukikage, Kurara arranges for a member of Moryo named Theresia Ray to be a transfer student at Sorasaki High School. It is revealed that Hatsume and Theresia were best friends during childhood despite starting off on the wrong foot. When they were kidnapped by child traffickers, Hatsume was rescued by her parents after her ransom was paid, but Theresia was sold off to Moryo under the belief that Hatsume had abandoned her. In the present, Hatsume believes that Theresia will have a change of heart despite being a member of Moryo. Yuki informs Byakko that there is no home for her outside of the underground base of Tsukikage. Thanks to Yuki's plan, Momo and Goe casually encounter Hatsume and Theresia in the streets before hanging out at Hatsume's apartment. Hatsume admits that her parents tried to pay off Theresia's ransom, but they were unable to establish contact with the child traffickers. Despite Theresia feeling betrayed by Hatsume long ago, Momo senses that Theresia wants to make amends with Hatsume. Meanwhile, Kurara kills Emo in cold blood.
7	"From Hatsume with Love" "Hatsume Yori Ai o Komete" (初芽より愛をこめて)	Takurō Tsukada	Aoi Akashiro	November 18, 2018	TBA
During a picnic, Momo, Fū and Goe discuss with Katrina how Hatsume has the tenacity to befriend Byakko. Goe starts to feel dejected when Hatsume takes Theresia to a pancake house. While in disguise, Kurara disperses a purple mist, causing citywide hypnotic riots. Momo, Yuki, Fū and Mei do some damage control throughout the city, while Hatsume soon learns that Goe was among the ones affected. After exposing her identity as a member of Tsukikage, Hatsume threatens Theresia with a supposed neurotoxin, forcing Theresia to flee. Goe is shown single-handedly attacking a crime syndicate in a building. Upon finding her, Momo and Yuki struggle against Goe in her affected state. Yuki successfully plants a transmitter on Goe, who gradually comes to her senses after Hatsume uses words of compassion over the phone before reaching her in person. During a briefing, it is revealed that the purple mist is a drug that inhibits one's sense of self, in which an extract from a purple plant only grown in Okinawa has been detected in the drug, giving Tsukikage a major lead in the investigation.
8	"Intelligence on Organization N" "N Kikan Jōhō" (N機関情報)	Michita Shiraishi	Aoi Akashiro	November 25, 2018	TBA
After neutralizing a jello shot inside Theresia, Hatsume reveals that it is a drug used for suicide bombings. Momo, Yuki, Fū and Goe take a trip to Okinawa for some fun in the sun. They talk to an old man, the only surviving member of the intelligence agency called the Shisa. He tells them that a girl wearing a horned helmet named Ingen Lua Ouka Miyaume is being forced to work for an evil organization called Nirai Kanai because her botanist grandfather was taken hostage. Momo, Yuki, Fū and Goe head towards the island base of Nirai Kanai, but they are thwarted by Ouka on a Viking ship. Goe faces off against Ouka, eventually convincing her to become an ally. Meanwhile, Momo, Yuki and Fū infiltrate the island base of Nirai Kanai on a mission to extract data and rescue Ouka's grandfather from captivity. Momo later fights the boss of Nirai Kanai, who attacks using habu snakes. Thanks to Ouka's remotely warding off the habu snakes using an acoustic device, Momo manages to defeat the boss of Nirai Kanai. Despite the mission being successful, Momo is left downhearted after she is scolded by Yuki for not prioritizing her own safety.
9	"Destiny Group" "Disutinī Sākuru" (ディスティニー・サークル)	Akira Sato; Takuro Tsukada; Hazuki Mizumoto	Takahiro	December 2, 2018	TBA
Hatsume informs Yuki that Theresia has escaped from the underground base of Tsukikage. In order to patch things up, Yuki spends the day off with Momo around town. In the past, Yuki was trained under her mentor Nagaho Fujibayashi. Nagaho confided in Yuki that the source of her power came from her love of the city of Sorasaki. Two years ago, Yuki, Mei, Hatsume, Katrina and Nagaho, the members of Tsukikage at the time, were tasked with stopping Aleksei, a military operative of Moryo, from hacking into satellites worldwide. However, Nagaho ultimately lost her life while protecting Yuki from a masked Kurara. In the present, Yuki is determined not to let the same thing happen to Momo. Helping Yuki with her investigation, Momo notices a woman whose face is always kept hidden from archived security footage, in which Momo and Yuki manage to identify the woman as Kurara herself.
10	"No Response from Sorasaki" "Sorasaki Ōtō Nashi" (ソラサキ応答無し)	Takashi Kumazen	Takahiro	December 9, 2018	TBA
Tsukikage has a few days to prepare for the decisive battle against Moryo, which will take place one day before a fireworks festival. Momo learns how Katrina became a former member of Tsukikage. After Hatsume is still unable to locate Theresia, Mei cooks an exquisite meal for Hatsume. Fū catches Mei hiding a pint of ice cream, and Mei tells Fū that she plans to travel abroad after graduation. After training with Yuki at the dojo, Momo learns that Yuki plans to study after graduation. On the day of the operation, Tsukikage captures Kurara. In the car on the way back to Wasabi, Yuki interrogates Kurara about what happened two years ago. However, Kurara detonates Wasabi with Katrina and Byakko inside, leading Tsukikage into an ambush. As Tsukikage is barricaded by armored trucks and surrounded by Theresia and numerous robots at a bridge, Mei suddenly reveals herself as the mole who was leaking information about Tsukikage to Moryo. Mei assists Theresia in seemingly disposing of Hatsume in the river below. Yuki is struck down by Kurara with her sword. Kurara then orders Theresia and Mei to capture Momo, Fū and Goe, all knocked unconscious, in preparation for Operation Gekkako.
11	"Operation Gekkako" "Gekkakō Sakusen" (ゲッカコウ作戦)	Yasuhiro Geshi; Hazuki Mizumoto	Takahiro	December 16, 2018	TBA
Mei reveals that she became a turncoat for Moryo ever since Tsukikage infiltrated the factory from the beginning. Momo, Fū and Goe manage to evade torture, using a secret passageway to the underground base of Tsukikage. They formulate a plan to stop Moryo from initiating Gekkako, a dispersal device which would brainwash the public citywide. The following day, Momo, Fū and Goe reunite with Yuki, who survived with an injured right leg but is willing to provide support. As the mission commences at a convention center, Goe and Fū respectively take on Theresia and Mei, while Momo aims to seek and destroy the Gekkako before the fireworks festival starts in the evening. Goe is beaten by Theresia, who contemplates her allegiance with Moryo. Kurara then slits Theresia's left arm, leaving Theresia for her betrayal. Mei manages to run away after planting explosives to distract Fū. The mission hits a snag when it is discovered that the convention center was used as an evacuation site for Moryo. Momo, Fū and Goe race across town, where Gekkako has emerged from the factory and begins to activate.
12	"Tsukikage is Forever" "Tsukikage wa Eien ni" (ツキカゲは永遠に)	Akira Sato; Yasunori Gotō; Akira Toba	Takahiro	December 23, 2018	TBA
Gekkako activates during the fireworks festival, greatly affected the public. Momo, Fū and Goe eventually shut down Gekkako with timely assistance from Katrina and Byakko. Hatsume appears at the convention center to help Mei, who reveals herself as a double agent, successfully fooling Kurara. Mei explains that she warned Katrina and Byakko to take refuge before Wasabi was detonated, and she switched Hatsume with a mannequin in the river to fake Hatsume's death. When Gekkako attempts to reboot, Momo duels with Kurara on the antenna. Momo defeats Kurara and disables Gekkako before it reactivates. With her plans thwarted and the public reverted to normal, Kurara falls to her death. Seventeen days later, Goe, Hatsume, Katrina, Theresia and Byakko enjoy curry together. Fū and Mei patch up their trust at their apartment, keeping Kurara's sparrow as their pet. At the pier, Yuki tells Momo about her desire to graduate from Tsukikage and lead a normal life. After a tearful exchange, Momo is bestowed the honor of wiping Yuki's memory. Nine months later, Momo becomes the mentor of a new apprentice named Ichika Saiga. Momo, Fū, Mei, Hatsume, Theresia, Byakko and Ichika, the current members of Tsukikage, start another mission.

=== Video game ===
A free-to-play mobile game titled Release the Spyce: Secret Fragrance was released for iOS and Android devices on February 12, 2019. The game's service ended on March 31, 2020.
