= List of Akame ga Kill! episodes =

- Cover of the first Akame ga Kill! compilation volume, featuring Akame.
- No. of episodes: 24

Release
- Original network: Tokyo MX
- Original release: July 7 – December 15, 2014

Akame ga Kill! is an anime television series adapted from the manga series of the same title by Takahiro and Tetsuya Tashiro. The story focuses on Tatsumi, a young villager who travels to the Capital to raise money for his home, only to discover a strong corruption in the area. The assassin group known as Night Raid recruits the young man to help them in their fight against the corruption of the Empire. He quickly finds out how corrupted the Capital really is.

Produced by White Fox and directed by Tomoki Kobayashi, it was broadcast in Japan on the Tokyo MX network from July 7, 2014, to December 15, 2014. The anime primarily adapts the first eight volumes of the manga, while the last five episodes feature a completely original, self-contained story arc giving insight to Night Raid's efforts to destroy the Empire, which resulted in it having a different ending to that of the manga. In July 2014, Sentai Filmworks licensed the series for an English release in North America, while Crunchyroll streamed the series in their official website. The episodes were collected on eight DVD and Blu-ray volumes from October 15, 2014, to May 20, 2015. The series aired on Adult Swim's Toonami programming block from August 9, 2015, to February 21, 2016.

The background music was composed by Taku Iwasaki. Four pieces of theme music are used for the series. The first opening theme song is "Skyreach" performed by Akame's voice actress Sora Amamiya. The first ending theme is "Konna Sekai, Shiritakunakatta." (こんな世界、知りたくなかった。) by Miku Sawai. The second opening theme song is "Liar Mask" performed by Rika Mayama. The second ending theme is "Tsukiakari" (月灯り) performed by Amamiya.

== Episode list ==
| No. | Title | Directed by | Written by | Original release date (Note: Tokyo MX lists the series as premiering on July 6, 2014, at 24:00, which is effectively July 7 at 12:00 a.m. JST.) | English air date (Note: Adult Swim lists the series as premiering on August 8, 2015, at 12:30 a.m. (24:30) EDT/PDT, which is effectively August 9.) |
|---|---|---|---|---|---|
| 1 | "Kill the Darkness"; Transliteration: "Yami o Kiru" (Japanese: 闇を斬る) | Tomoki Kobayashi | Makoto Uezu | July 7, 2014 | August 9, 2015 |
A swordsman named Tatsumi travels to the Capital in hopes of raising money for his impoverished village. After he is robbed by a blonde girl in a tavern, he is forced to sleep in the streets, but he is soon invited by a rich girl named Aria to stay at her manor. While waiting for his best friends, Sayo and Ieyasu, to arrive at the Capital, Tatsumi learns of Night Raid, a group of assassins known to attack at night. Come nightfall, Night Raid appears at the manor and kills Aria's guards and parents. During this time, Tatsumi shields Aria while facing off against Night Raid member Akame, only to be interrupted by Night Raid member Leone, the blonde girl from the tavern. Leone reveals to Tatsumi that Aria and her parents have tortured several people from the countryside, including Sayo and Ieyasu. With Sayo already dead, Tatsumi kills Aria without hesitation or mercy, just before Ieyasu dies. Leone invites Tatsumi to join Night Raid against his will.
| 2 | "Kill the Authority"; Transliteration: "Kenryoku o Kiru" (Japanese: 権力を斬る) | Kazuhiro Ozawa | Makoto Uezu | July 14, 2014 | August 16, 2015 |
Leone takes Tatsumi to the hideout of Night Raid and introduces him to the other members, all of whom Tatsumi views as freaks. Night Raid leader Najenda convinces Tatsumi to join Night Raid, since it is their mission to overthrow the Empire and to set up a new democratic government in its place. Najenda assigns Akame to train Tatsumi, but Tatsumi ends up merely cooking and fishing. Tatsumi is later given the assignment to assassinate the corrupt captain of the Imperial Police named Ogre, who often framed innocent people as criminals. At night, Tatsumi finds Ogre in the streets, where they draw swords at each other. When Ogre becomes arrogant, Tatsumi kills Ogre with the slash of his sword. As a cocky Tatsumi reports back to the hideout, Akame does a strip search on him, making sure he was not wounded. Since he has survived thus far, she accepts him as a member of Night Raid.
| 3 | "Kill Your Cares"; Transliteration: "Wadakamari o Kiru" (Japanese: 蟠（ワダカマリ）を斬る) | Takahiro Kawakoshi | Makoto Uezu | July 21, 2014 | August 23, 2015 |
Najenda dispatches Night Raid to take down eight tribal assassins trying to invade the hideout. The next morning, Tatsumi is assigned to train under Night Raid member Mine. While roaming the streets, Tatsumi becomes frustrated because he mainly shopped around town with Mine for some clothes. Later on, they witness the Prime Minister Honest ordering the execution of a man who saw through Minister Honest's true colors; The tyrannical de facto ruler of the Empire. Later on, Najenda sends Night Raid on a mission to assassinate Iokal, a distant blood relative of Prime Minister Honest of the Empire. Iokal is responsible for kidnapping women and abusing them to death. At the mansion, Tatsumi watches as Mine uses her Imperial Arms Pumpkin, a powerful rifle gun, to snipe Iokal dead, despite Iokal being surrounded by innocent women he captured. Tatsumi also listens to the story of how Mine was abused in her childhood for her half- foreign blood; and ran away to join the Revolutionary Arm in hope that no one else would suffer the same discrimination and torture she did. The last one of five bodyguards ambushes Tatsumi and Mine, having escaped from being killed by the rest of the members of Night Raid. Tatsumi restrains the bodyguard, giving Mine the opportunity to snipe. However, Tatsumi is upset that Mine grazed his hair with her shot.
| 4 | "Kill the Imperial Arms User"; Transliteration: "Teigu tsukai o Kiru" (Japanese: 帝具使いを斬る) | Hiroyuki Tsuchiya | Makoto Uezu | July 28, 2014 | August 30, 2015 |
The members of Night Raid discuss about their next target, the infamou Zanku, a former executioner who became addicted to beheading several victims at night. Najenda explains to Tatsumi about the origin of the Imperial Arms, powerful relics that are wielded, of which the members of Night Raid all currently possess. The Imperial Arms are so lethal that if two wielders choose to duel, one of them will ultimately perish. In the streets, Tatsumi and Akame pair up to find Zanku. Tatsumi is led away by an illusion of Sayo, soon falling into a trap set by Zanku, who uses his Imperial Arms Spectator, a headpiece that grants precognition to predict every attack. Akame finds Tatsumi when he becomes wounded, and she takes his place to battle Zanku alone. Zanku tries to trick Akame by creating the illusion of Akame's younger sister Kurome. Akame quickly destroys the illusion and then kills Zanku, using her Imperial Arms Murasame, a sword with a poisonous blade. He rests in peace, now that he is no longer driven mad by the voices of the executed victims.
| 5 | "Kill the Dream"; Transliteration: "Yumemonogatari o Kiru" (Japanese: 夢物語を斬る) | Tomoko Hiramuki | Doko Machita | August 4, 2014 | September 13, 2015 (Note: On the broadcast night of September 5–6, 2015, Adult Swim hosted a Michiko & Hatchin Labor Day Marathon where they played episodes 4–10.) |
Tatsumi is surprised that he will be training under Night Raid member Sheele for the day. After Tatsumi learns how to swim while in his suit of armor, Sheele mentions her inability to do various chores, which explains her clumsiness. Sheele first discovered her abilities as an assassin when she rescued her best friend by killing her best friend's ex-boyfriend. Later, Tatsumi tries on Zanku's recovered Spectator, but it rejects him when he attempts to activate it. The top priority of Night Raid is to collect every Imperial Arms known in existence, which are all documented in a book. However, Tatsumi is upset upon learning that none are capable of resurrecting the deceased. The next day, Tatsumi becomes separated from Leone while patrolling the marketplace. He is aided back to the marketplace by Seryu Ubiquitous of the Imperial Police, who possess the Imperial Arms Hecatoncheir, a dog-like pet nicknamed "Koro". When she runs off, Seryu intends to seek to kill all of Night Raid for the death of her mentor, revealed to be Ogre.
| 6 | "Kill the Absolute Justice"; Transliteration: "Zettai Seigi o Kiru" (Japanese: 絶対正義を斬る) | Manabu Okamoto | Doko Machita | August 11, 2014 | September 20, 2015 |
Tatsumi and Leone infiltrate a temple to assassinate a gang of drug smugglers, who have incapacitated and drugged a large group of women. Leone uses her Imperial Arms Lionel, a belt which gives her feline-like abilities, to take out the gang. Meanwhile, Mine and Sheele are ambushed by Seryu, in which her Koro can regenerate and increase in size. While Mine uses Pumpkin to attack Koro, Sheele uses her Imperial Arms Extase, a huge pair of scissors, to chop off Seryu's arms. Although it is revealed that Seryu was concealing guns inside her arms, Sheele deflects the gunshot and slices off the guns. Koro goes berserk, grabbing Mine and nearly crushing her to death. When Sheele rescues Mine, Seryu fires a shot from a gun concealed in her mouth at Sheele. Mine watches in horror as Koro bites Sheele in half. Sheele is able to use Extase to emit a blinding light as her trump card, allowing Mine to flee as Sheele is killed after being devoured by Koro. As it rains, the other members of Night Raid are in shock when Mine informs them of the death of Sheele.
| 7 | "Kill the Three - Part One -"; Transliteration: "Sanbiki o Kiru - Zenpen -" (Japanese: 三匹を斬る - 前編 -) | Atsushi Shibata | Makoto Uezu | August 18, 2014 | September 27, 2015 |
The Emperor of the Empire orders General Esdeath of the Empire to hunt down Night Raid in exchange for a marital suitor. Tatsumi, assuming that Akame is calm and composed ever since the death of Sheele, is surprised that Akame has been utterly devastated, which gives him the ambition of protecting her and staying alive. Esdeath dispatches the Three Beasts (Daidara, Nyau and Liver), an elite group of Imperial Arms users, to take out Prime Minister Chouri and his daughter Spear from the northern tribe, who were political rivals against Honest. The Three Beasts then spread flyers to frame Night Raid for the murders. Najenda sends Tatsumi and Night Raid member Bulat aboard a massive luxury liner. There, Nyau uses his Imperial Arms Scream, a flute that weakens those who hear its melody, but Tatsumi resists its sound. Tatsumi is then confronted by Daidara, who uses his Imperial Arms Belvark, an axe that splits into two blades. Bulat intervenes and uses his Imperial Arms Incursio, a sealed white sword that releases into a suit of armor, to kill Daidara. Bulat recognizes Liver as a former general of the Imperial Police.
| 8 | "Kill the Three - Part Two -"; Transliteration: "Sanbiki o Kiru - Kōhen -" (Japanese: 三匹を斬る - 後編 -) | Sekiya Mamiko | Makoto Uezu | August 25, 2014 | October 4, 2015 |
Liver uses his Imperial Arms Black Marine, a ring that controls any form of liquid, in which Bulat has the disadvantage due to being surrounded by an ocean. Meanwhile, Tatsumi fights against Nyau, who is very quick on his feet. Liver unleashes a special attack, which causes Bulat and Liver's Imperial Arms to wear out due to critical damage. After Bulat turns down Liver's offer to join Esdeath's army, Bulat and Liver engage in a sword fight to the finish. Bulat manages to mortally wound Liver, who dies after revealing that he joined Esdeath because of his respect and admiration for her. Bulat realizes that Liver injected poison into his blood as a last resort, in which Liver manipulated his spilled blood to pierce through Bulat. As Nyau uses Scream to bulk up his body, Bulat entrusts Incursio to Tatsumi, who successfully activates it and manages to kill Nyau. Bulat succumbs to his wounds soon after, and Tatsumi sorrowfully mourns.
| 9 | "Kill the Lust for Combat"; Transliteration: "Sentōkyō o Kiru" (Japanese: 戦闘狂を斬る) | Sasaki Junhito | Doko Machita | September 1, 2014 | October 11, 2015 |
As Mine has her arm fully recovered, she sees Tatsumi and Night Raid member Lubbock doing pushups with Akame and Leone literally on their backs. Najenda assigns Akame as temporary leader before planning to leave to recruit new members. Meanwhile, the Jaegers (Wave, Kurome, Seryu, Dr. Stylish, Run and Bols) assemble and Esdeath brutally introduces herself as the leader of this group, whose mission is to hunt down the enemies of the Empire. Lubbock invites Tatsumi and Leone into his library, where he explains that Najenda was disgusted with Esdeath's excessive cruelty against the southwestern tribal army many years ago. Esdeath sponsors a tournament, secretly to find her marital suitor. Tatsumi enters the tournament under the guise of a blacksmith. After Tatsumi flawlessly kills a bullheaded opponent in the arena and wins the tournament, Esdeath suddenly becomes infatuated with his prowess. As she approaches him, she shackles him and takes him inside the palace. Akame, Leone, Mine and Lubbock learn about this and discuss whether or not they should rescue Tatsumi.
| 10 | "Kill the Temptation"; Transliteration: "Yūwaku o Kiru" (Japanese: 誘惑を斬る) | Yoshiko Mikami | Nakamura Hiroshi | September 8, 2014 | October 18, 2015 |
Esdeath and the Jaegers raid and destroy a fortress of bandits, and Tatsumi is forced to watch. Later, as Esdeath tries to get intimate with Tatsumi in her bedroom, Tatsumi resist temptation and tries to convince her to join his side. However, she slaps him, saying that she will never change for him, despite his debate that the Empire is corrupt. The next day, Esdeath assigns Tatsumi and Wave to the west part of the mountains, tasking them to take out a group of Tree Beasts. Although Tatsumi uses Incursio to escape into a forest, Wave uses his Imperial Arms Grand Chariot, a sealed black sword that releases into a suit of armor, to follow Tatsumi. After Tatsumi manages to swiftly run away, he encounters a Jackaleo. Akame kills the Jackaleo, while Lubbock takes Tatsumi and Akame back into the mountains. At the palace, Esdeath punishes Wave brick by brick for allowing Tatsumi to escape, yet Esdeath is still determined to get Tatsumi back. At the library, Tatsumi tells Akame, Leone, Mine and Lubbock about Esdeath and the Jaegers.
| 11 | "Kill the Mad Scientist"; Transliteration: "Maddo Saientisuto o Kiru" (Japanese: マッドサイエンティストを斬る) | Atsushi Ikaritani | Hiroshi Jiro | September 15, 2014 | October 25, 2015 |
Dr. Stylish and Team Stylish (Hana, Kaku, Me, Mimi, Toby and Trooma) find and attack the hideout of Night Raid. Tatsumi struggles to fight Kaku, who is in possession of Sheele's Extase, but Mine steps in and uses Pumpkin to blast him down. Meanwhile, Akame battles Toby, whose mechanical body is equipped with guns and swords. Lubbock uses his Imperial Arms Cross Tail, a reel of strings that can be manipulated, to form a spear and stab Toby in the chest. Trooma tries to attack Mine from behind, but Leone intercepts with a surprise attack and kills him with a single blow. Dr. Stylish's foot soldiers surround Tatsumi, Akame, Leone, Mine and Lubbock, and all but Tatsumi are afflicted by Dr. Stylish's paralytic poison injected into the foot soldiers. Najenda rides on an Air Manta and dispatches Susanoo, who easily defeats the foot soldiers. Soon after, Dr. Stylish injects himself with a vial that transforms him into a Danger Beast, and he consumes Hana, Me and Mimi to become stronger. After Susanoo is unable to attack, Tatsumi, Akame and Mine work together to kill Dr. Stylish's human body inside the Danger Beast.
| 12 | "Kill the Newcomers"; Transliteration: "Shiniri o Kiru" (Japanese: 新入りを斬る) | Hiroyuki Tsuchiya | Nakamura Hiroshi | September 22, 2014 | November 8, 2015 (Note: On October 31–November 1, 2015, Adult Swim ran a marathon on Halloween of episodes 4–8 and also showed extra episodes of 9–11 due to daylight saving time.) |
Tatsumi, Akame, Leone, Mine and Lubbock are introduced to Chelsea and Susanoo, Najenda's newest recruit and a humanoid Imperial Arms. Meanwhile, Esdeath comforts Seryu over the death of Dr. Stylish. Tatsumi and Leone take out a horde of Marg Dons in the forest. Chelsea uses her Imperial Arms Gaia Foundation, a cosmetics box that allows her to take on any appearance, to change into a cat and steal cake from Mine, who becomes very angry. Chelsea later berates Night Raid for being incompetent, mentioning the deaths of Sheele and Bulat. Mine convinces Tatsumi and Lubbock to teach Chelsea a lesson for what she said. Lubbock tells Tatsumi to sneak up on Chelsea while she is bathing in the hot springs bath. It turns out that Chelsea used Gaia Foundation to take on the appearance of Susanoo to confuse Tatsumi at first. She reveals to be the only survivor of her former team that was massacred in the past, hence why she berated Night Raid in the first place. Elsewhere, Esdeath is told by Run about a list of lookalikes of Tatsumi, but she declares that there is only one Tatsumi whom she loves.
| 13 | "Kill the Nuisances"; Transliteration: "Jamamono o Kiru" (Japanese: 邪魔者を斬る) | Masahiro Sonoda | Doko Machita | September 29, 2014 | November 15, 2015 |
Honest assigns Esdeath to track down various Danger Beasts, which have appeared in forests and mines. Bols saves two merchants from being attacked by Humanoid Danger Beasts, but Wave witnesses the merchants being terrified of Bols due to his fearsome appearance. Later, Bols explains that despite his nice personality, he used to be an executioner and burned down many infested villages. Bols is visited by his wife Kije and daughter Logue, who are very well aware of his line of work. While training with Susanoo, Tatsumi considers him as a companion rather than just a tool. The members of Night Raid are given the mission to kill Humanoid Danger Beasts, intentionally helping the Imperial Army. Meanwhile, Esdeath and Run discuss that the Humanoid Danger Beasts are a result of Dr. Stylish's human experiments, therefore the Humanoid Danger Beasts must have somehow escaped their containment. While patrolling the mountains at night, Tatsumi learns that Lubbock joined Night Raid to get closer to Najenda, though his love is unrequited. Tatsumi travels alone to the summit, where he suddenly encounters Esdeath, who is shocked to see him.
| 14 | "Kill the Giant Danger Beast"; Transliteration: "Kyodai Kikenshu o Kiru" (Japanese: 巨大危険種を斬る) | Iwatsuki Jinkichi | Makoto Uezu | October 6, 2014 | November 22, 2015 |
The reunion of Tatsumi and Esdeath is cut short when Honest's son Syura appears and uses his Imperial Arms Shambhala, a pendant capable of spatial manipulation, which teleports the two to a remote island. When two Modified Danger Beasts appear, Tatsumi and Esdeath slay each of them. After Tatsumi and Esdeath explore the island, they find out that they were teleported by a trigram circle symbol created by Syura. Esdeath reveals that she lived by the law of "survival of the fittest" and became a general in the Imperial Army, as a result of the northern tribe killing her late father and her former clan of Danger Beast hunters. She also selected the Imperial Arms Demon's Extract, the blood of a Danger Beast which she drank in order to create and manipulate ice. When Syura's portal reappears, Tatsumi and Esdeath pass through and return to the mountains. Tatsumi uses his Incursio to hide before Esdeath has the chance of seeing him.
| 15 | "Kill the Religious Organization"; Transliteration: "Kyōdan o Kiru" (Japanese: 教団を斬る) | Sasaki Junhito | Doko Machita | October 13, 2014 | December 6, 2015 (Note: On the broadcast night of November 28–29, 2015, Adult Swim hosted a Parasyte -the maxim- Marathon where they played episodes 1–7.) |
Najenda prepares a strategy meeting for Night Raid after they sit down to eat. Meanwhile, Wave confronts Seryu for murdering three thieves suspected as members of Night Raid. Najenda tells Night Raid that they will launch attacks against the Empire during an uprising caused by Path of Peace, a pacifist religious organization. Night Raid is assigned to assassinate Bolic, the assistant to the leader of Path of Peace while working as an agent under Honest. Bolic has been drugging members of Path of Peace to become his slaves and prevent them from an insurrection on the Empire. The members of Night Raid have fun at the beach before carrying out their mission. The Jaegers split into two teams, in which Esdeath, Seryu and Run head east, while Wave, Kurome and Bols head south. At a canyon in the south, Night Raid confronts Wave, Kurome and Bols. Kurome uses her Imperial Arms Yatsufusa, a katana that turns her victims into zombies.
| 16 | "Kill the Dolls"; Transliteration: "Ningyō o Kiru" (Japanese: 人形を斬る) | Hiroyuki Tsuchiya | Nakamura Hiroshi | October 20, 2014 | December 13, 2015 |
Kurome's puppets (Death Tagool, Natala, Doya, Apeman, Henter, Wall, Rokugou and Kaiser Frog) emerge, and the battle in the canyon begins. While Susanoo fights Death Tagool, Mine pursues Doya. Tatsumi becomes overwhelmed by Apeman and Henter, until Chelsea later disguises herself as a tribesman to distract and kill Henter with a poisoned needle to the head, leaving Tatsumi to finish off Apeman. While Leone and Najenda take on Rokugou, Kurome slices off Leone's left arm, forcing Najenda to kill Rokugou herself. As Akame combats Wall and Bols at the same time, she tells Bols that she joined Night Raid because she believes it in her heart to be the right path. Mine is swallowed by Kaiser Frog, but she manages to pierce through Kaiser Frog and escape. Susanoo uses his trump card, transforming into an armored form gained from Najenda's life force, to kill Death Tagool. After Leone and Akame team up to kill Wall, Bols uses his Imperial Arm Rubicante, a powerful flamethrower. Since Rubicante is damaged from the battle, Bols throws it upward and detonates it, causing a massive explosion around him.
| 17 | "Kill the Curse"; Transliteration: "Jubaku o Kiru" (Japanese: 呪縛を斬る) | Manabu Okamoto | Doko Machita | October 27, 2014 | January 3, 2016 |
Akame and Leone survive the massive explosion. Bols meets a crying girl while walking in the woods, treating her bruised shin with a bandage. The girl is revealed to be Chelsea in disguise, and she pierces his nape with a poisoned needle. After Chelsea requests Lubbock to call for backup, she disguises herself as Bols and pursues Kurome. In the past, Akame and Kurome were trained together to be elite assassins, but they were separated due to their reliance on each other. Kurome was experimented with various drugs to enhance her fighting prowess. In the present, Chelsea as Bols finds Kurome and uses this opportunity to stab her with a poisoned needle to her back. In the past, Chelsea worked as an apprentice to a viceroy, who accepted bribes and hunted people for fun. She killed the viceroy after acquiring Gaia Foundation for the first time. In the present, Kurome somehow survives the poison, ordering Natala and Doya to kill Chelsea. During a downpour, Tatsumi and Akame reach a town square, where Chelsea's severed head is displayed on the top of a pole.
| 18 | "Kill the Demon"; Transliteration: "Oni o Kiru" (Japanese: 鬼を斬る) | Kazuomi Koga | Makoto Uezu | November 3, 2014 | January 10, 2016 |
Esdeath and the Jaegers are ordered by Honest to protect Bolic, who summons the Four Rakshasa Demons of the Imperial Fist Temple (Ibara, Sten, Mez and Suzuka), who are able to manipulate their bodies in a myriad of ways. Then, Bolic sends them on the offensive. Wave is surprised that Kurome quickly recovers, but he realizes that Kurome is putting on a facade so she could stay as a member of the Jaegers. Meanwhile, Night Raid enters Kyoroch, the headquarters of Path of Peace. Tatsumi and Mine explore the busy marketplace. At a cemetery, Akame takes on Ibara, using Murasame to chop him into pieces. In the city streets, Lubbock fights Sten and Mez, using Cross Tail to crush Sten's heart from the inside and to stab Mez's back with knives. On the outskirts of town, Tatsumi and Mine quarrel as they encounter the Lord, the leader and founder of Path of Peace.
| 19 | "Kill the Fate"; Transliteration: "Innen o Kiru" (Japanese: 因縁を斬る) | Masaki Matsumura | Makoto Uezu | November 10, 2014 | January 17, 2016 |
Night Raid plans to infiltrate the palace during the anniversary festival of Path of Peace. Susanoo cooks favorite meals for the members in preparation for the mission. Tatsumi and Mine wear disguises as a diversion to get out of the city undetected, but Seryu spots them and attacks them with a barrage of missiles. As Suzuka also arrives and attacks, Tatsumi averts her away from the area, while Mine fights Seryu and Koro alone, with Koro being easily taken down by Mine's increased power. Tatsumi defeats Suzuka by crushing her under nearby ruins. As she destroys most of Seryu's weapons, Mine gets beaten and bruised from Seryu's lightning-speed punches, nearly dying in the process, but Mine musters up her strength and uses Pumpkin to slice Seryu and Koro in half. Seryu retaliates by setting off a suicide bomb implanted in her head. As Mine is too wounded to get far away enough from the nuclear explosion, Tatsumi ends up saving her from the blast, which kills both Seryu and Koro. Meanwhile, the rest of Night Raid storms the palace. Although Esdeath advises Bolic not to leave, he later attempts to flee, only to be killed by Akame and Lubbock.
| 20 | "Kill the Carnage"; Transliteration: "Shura o Kiru" (Japanese: 修羅を斬る) | Daisuke Eguchi | Doko Machita | November 17, 2014 | January 24, 2016 |
Wave and Run worry when Kurome collapses. Tatsumi and Lubbock covertly meet up with the palace maid working as a member of the resistance. At the entrance to the palace, they soon find themselves surrounded by Syura and his elite unit. Great General Budo of the Empire appears and uses his Imperial Arms Adramelech, a pair of gauntlets that generate electricity, to attack Tatsumi. Lubbock struggles as Syura repeatedly warps himself on the ground and in midair using Shambhala. When the palace maid restrains Lubbock, she is injured by Syura, who is blindsided when his right hand holding Shambhala is cut off by Lubbock. However, the palace maid stabs Lubbock in the back, as she pleads Syura to let her family go before dying. Syura laughs at her death, stating he already killed her family a while ago and teleports Lubbock into an abyss, but Lubbock uses Cross Tail to pull Syura into the abyss. Lubbock kills Syura by crushing his heart from the inside, which then sends them both to high above the palace. After Cross Tail breaks, Lubbock falls on the swords of Syura's men, being stabbed to death. Tatsumi, after being captured by Budo, is sentenced to death by Honest. Esdeath tells Honest to give her the honors to conduct the execution.
| 21 | "Kill the Despair"; Transliteration: "Zetsubō o Kiru" (Japanese: 絶望を斬る) | Tomoki Kobayashi | Doko Machita | November 24, 2014 | January 31, 2016 |
Akame, Leone, Mine, Najenda and Susanoo prepare for their mission to rescue Tatsumi. Meanwhile, Tatsumi refuses to join Esdeath for her cause. During the execution in the coliseum, Night Raid attacks just as Esdeath is about to kill Tatsumi. Akame enters the palace and defeats the Imperial Police in order to retrieve Incursio. As Najenda and Susanoo confront Esdeath, Najenda has Susanoo uses his trump card to repel any attack Esdeath throws at them. As Leone and Mine fight Budo, Leone becomes paralyzed, leaving Mine to take on Budo by herself. Mine and Budo each channel and release their strongest blast from their Imperial Arms. Mine kills and obliterates Budo, but she is left heavily wounded. Akame frees Tatsumi, who uses Incursio to save Mine from falling. Esdeath uses her trump card to freeze time and destroy Susanoo's core, but Najenda uses her trump card in retaliation to restore Susanoo. While Susanoo keeps Esdeath busy, Tatsumi carries Mine as the other members of Night Raid head back to the hideout. As Tatsumi sets Mine down to rest, she confesses her feelings and kisses him before she dies.
| 22 | "Kill the Little Sister"; Transliteration: "Imōto o Kiru" (Japanese: 妹を斬る) | Tomoki Kobayashi | Makoto Uezu | December 1, 2014 | February 7, 2016 |
The remaining Night Raid mourns Lubbock, Mine and Susanoo before moving on with their plan to kill Honest and end his tyranny. Wave learns that Run joined the Jaegers in order to reform the Empire, which is filled with corruption and rebellion. Run is also aware that Kurome is slowly dying. Meanwhile, Kurome sends a message to Akame, challenging her to a duel in the ruins of a church. Tatsumi fails to dissuade Akame, and she leaves to confront Kurome. Once there, Akame and Kurome fight as the latter expresses resentment for being abandoned, while the former tries to explain the need to overthrow the Empire due to its corruption. When a giant robotic Danger Beast appears, Akame and Kurome work together to defeat it. Wave arrives to help Kurome, but Tatsumi also arrives and prevents Wave from interfering with the duel. Akame manages to stab through Kurome, finally having closure with her little sister, and Wave carries Kurome's body with him as he departs. Akame mourns her sister's death by crying in Tatsumi's arms. Elsewhere, Honest instructs the Emperor to activate the ultimate Imperial Arms in order to stop the revolution.
| 23 | "Kill the Emperor"; Transliteration: "Kōtei o Kiru" (Japanese: 皇帝を斬る) | Tomoki Kobayashi | Makoto Uezu | December 8, 2014 | February 14, 2016 |
Tatsumi, Akame, Leone and Najenda start their final mission to assassinate Honest. As Tatsumi, Akame and Leone break into the palace, they are confronted by Run, who uses his Imperial Arms Mastema, a pair of plates on his back that grows wings which double as weapons. Leone stays behind to deal with Run, while Tatsumi and Akame reach the throne room. Under Honest's influence, the Emperor activates his Imperial Arm "Shikoutazer", a giant 500-feet tall mecha, and causes destruction in the Capital. Tatsumi tries to convince the Emperor to have compassion for the citizens, but the Emperor becomes selfish in his cause to maintain power. Wave joins Tatsumi in the battle against the Emperor. After Tatsumi manages to strike the core of Shikoutazer, he unlocks the true power of Incursio to defeat the Emperor and destroy his Shikoutazer. Tatsumi, using his last ounce of strength to stop Shikoutazer from tumbling towards the citizens, dies in the arms of Akame soon after.
| 24 | "Akame ga Kill!"; Transliteration: "Akame ga kiru!" (Japanese: アカメが斬る!) | Tomoki Kobayashi | Makoto Uezu | December 15, 2014 | February 21, 2016 |
With Tatsumi now dead, Esdeath challenges Akame to a duel. Akame is forced to unleash her trump card by poisoning herself, thereby increasing her physical abilities. Eventually, Akame wounds Esdeath's left arm, and Esdeath cuts it off to prevent the poison from spreading through her body. Before Akame initiates the final strike, Esdeath uses her trump card to freeze time, but this does not stop Akame from dealing a fatal blow on Esdeath. With her last effort, Esdeath encases herself and Tatsumi in ice, which shatters them both into pieces. Meanwhile, Leone corners Honest before he tries to escape the palace, intending to kill him once and for all. However, he uses his Imperial Arms Erase Stone, a crown which can break other Imperial Arms, in order to destroy Leone's Lionel. Leone punches Honest and has him at her mercy, even when he shoots at her repeatedly with his gun, and kills him by crushing his skull, putting an end to his corruption and tyranny. Leone bids farewell to Akame and later dies in an alleyway. Najenda sentences the Emperor to death for corrupting the Empire, while Wave and Run pay respects to Kurome's grave. Najenda takes responsibility to help rebuild and restore the Capital. Akame part ways with Najenda and leaves to parts unknown.

== Original net animations ==
The ONA series is produced by C-Station with cooperation by White Fox and are directed by Masafumi Tamura with character designs by Asami Watanabe.

| No. | Title | Original air date |
|---|---|---|
| 1 | "Tatsumi and Leone"; Transliteration: "Tatsumi to Reōne" (Japanese: タツミとレオーネ) | July 6, 2014 |
| 2 | "1 minute cooking" Transliteration: "Ippunkan Kukkingu" (Japanese: 1分間クッキング) | July 13, 2014 |
| 3 | "Hot Spring"; Transliteration: "Onsen" (Japanese: 温泉) | July 20, 2014 |
| 4 | "Mail order Part 1"; Transliteration: "Tsūhan Sono Ichi" (Japanese: 通販その①) | July 27, 2014 |
| 5 | "Glasses"; Transliteration: "Megane" (Japanese: メガネ) | August 3, 2014 |
| 6 | "Esdeath's Fun Torture Classroom"; Transliteration: "Esudesu no Tanoshī Gōmon Kyōshitu" (Japanese: エスデスの楽しい拷問教室) | August 10, 2014 |
| 7 | "Social Studies Field Trip"; Transliteration: "Shakai Kengaku" (Japanese: 社会見学) | August 17, 2014 |
| 8 | "Folktale: Estaro"; Transliteration: "Mukashibanashi Esutarō" (Japanese: むかしばなし エス太朗) | August 24, 2014 |
| 9 | "Job Interview"; Transliteration: "Mensetsu" (Japanese: 面接) | August 31, 2014 |
| 10 | "DX Incursio"; Transliteration: "Derakkusu Inkurushio" (Japanese: DXインクルシオ) | September 7, 2014 |
| 11 | "Girl's Bar"; Transliteration: "Gāruzu Bā" (Japanese: ガールズバー) | September 14, 2014 |
| 12 | "Mail order Part 2"; Transliteration: "Tsūhan Sono Ni" (Japanese: 通販その②) | September 21, 2014 |
| 13 | "New Hideout"; Transliteration: "Atarashī Ajito" (Japanese: 新しいアジト) | September 28, 2014 |
| 14 | "Love Esdeath, Seriously!"; Transliteration: "Majikoi" (Japanese: まじこい) | October 5, 2014 |
| 15 | "Seryu's Fun Crime Prevention Classroom"; Transliteration: "Seryū no Tanoshī Bōhan Kyōshitsu" (Japanese: セリューの楽しい防犯教室) | October 12, 2014 |
| 16 | "Mother's Memory...!?"; Transliteration: "Haha no Omoide...!?" (Japanese: 母の思い出…！？) | October 19, 2014 |
| 17 | "Ghost House"; Transliteration: "Obake Yashiki" (Japanese: オバケ屋敷) | October 26, 2014 |
| 18 | "Lightning Speed! Susanoo-san"; Transliteration: "Denkōsekka ! Susano-san" (Japanese: 電光石火！スサヌオさん) | November 2, 2014 |
| 19 | "Rakshasa Stand-Up"; Transliteration: "Rasetsu no Omanzai" (Japanese: 羅刹のお漫才) | November 9, 2014 |
| 20 | "Mail order Part 3"; Transliteration: "Tsūhan Sono San" (Japanese: 通販その③) | November 16, 2014 |
| 21 | "Folktale: Tsuru no Ongaeshi"; Transliteration: "Mukashibanashi Tsuru no Ongaeshi" (Japanese: むかしばなし つるの恩返し) | November 23, 2014 |
| 22 | "Akame and Kurome"; Transliteration: "Akame to Kurome" (Japanese: アカメ と クロメ) | November 30, 2014 |
| 23 | "Departure"; Transliteration: "Tabidachi" (Japanese: 旅立ち) | December 7, 2014 |
| 24 | "Party for Mission Accomplished"; Transliteration: "Uchiage Pātī" (Japanese: 打ち上げパーティー) | December 14, 2014 |

== Home media release ==
=== Japanese ===
Toho Co., Ltd.
| Vol. | Episodes | Release date | Ref. |
|---|---|---|---|
| 1 | 1–3 | October 15, 2014 | |
| 2 | 4–6 | November 19, 2014 | |
| 3 | 7–9 | December 17, 2014 | |
| 4 | 10–12 | January 21, 2015 | |
| 5 | 13–15 | February 18, 2015 | |
| 6 | 16–18 | March 18, 2015 | |
| 7 | 19–21 | April 15, 2015 | |
| 8 | 22–24 | May 20, 2015 | |

=== English ===
Sentai Filmworks
| Collection | Episodes | Release date | Ref. |
|---|---|---|---|
| 1 | 1–12 | February 9, 2016 | |
| 2 | 13–24 | May 17, 2016 | |
| Complete | 1–24 | December 4, 2018 | |

== See also ==
- List of Akame ga Kill! chapters
- List of Akame ga Kill! characters
