= List of Akame ga Kill! chapters =

Chapters of Japanese manga series

Akame ga Kill! is a Japanese manga series written by Takahiro and illustrated by Tetsuya Tashiro. The story focuses on Tatsumi who is a young villager that travels to the Capital to raise money for his home only to discover a strong corruption in the area. He meets a group of assassins called Night Raid who recruit him to help them in their fight against the Empire's corruption.

The series began serialization in the April 2010 issue of Square Enix's Gangan Joker, first published on March 20, 2010. The first tankōbon volume was published on August 21, 2010, and fifteen volumes in total have been released as of February 22, 2017. The series was licensed by Yen Press in June 2014 and the first volume was released on January 20, 2015.

A prequel titled Akame ga Kill! Zero (アカメが斬る！零, Akame ga Kiru! Rei) was serialized on 11th issue of Monthly Big Gangan magazine on October 25, 2013, and ended on January 25, 2019. The series was written by Takahiro and illustrated by Kei Toru. The story focuses on Akame's past during the days she worked as an assassin for the Empire. It was compiled into ten tankōbon volumes. It was licensed by Yen Press in September 2015 and the first volume was released March 22, 2016.

Takahiro published a spin-off manga titled Hinowa ga Crush! (ヒノワが征く！, Hinowa ga Yuku!) with art by strelka in Monthly Big Gangan from June 24, 2017, to June 24, 2022. The story and characters are completely unrelated to Akame ga Kill!, with the only shared element being the inclusion of Akame as a side character. Yen Press has licensed the manga and released new chapters simultaneously with Japan.

== Akame ga Kill! ==
No.	Original release date	Original ISBN	English release date	English ISBN
1	August 21, 2010	978-4-7575-2980-9	January 20, 2015	978-0-316-25946-0
1. "Kill the Darkness" (闇を斬る, Yami o Kiru); 2. "Kill the Country" (国を斬る, Kuni o Kiru); 3. "Kill the Authority" (権力を斬る, Kenryoku o Kiru); 4. "Kill the Antagonism" (蟠りを斬る, Wadakamari o Kiru)
Tatsumi travels to the imperial capital to make money to save his village. In the capital city, he is befriended by a buxom woman named Leone who offers to find him some work, but ends up taking his savings. A noble girl named Aria offers shelter for him, but later on, Aria's mansion is attacked by an assassin group called Night Raid. Tatsumi battles Akame to protect Aria, but when Leone arrives and reveals that Aria and her family had been killing and torturing a number of people including Tatsumi's comrades, he kills Aria, and is recruited by Leone to join Night Raid. Their leader Najenda and another member named Bulat motivate Tatsumi to eliminate the capital's corruption and he joins the group. One of their first tasks is to defend their keep from some attackers. Tatsumi then works with Akame to go after Ogre and Gamal, who have committed numerous crimes and framed innocent people for them. He goes with Night Raid member Mine to shop in the city and then on a mission to kill the prime minister's relative, who had been abducting women and beating them to death.
2	January 22, 2011	978-4-7575-3129-1	April 21, 2015	978-0-316-34002-1
5. "Kill the Killer" (辻斬りを斬る, Tsujigiri o Kiru); 6. "Kill the Teigu Wielder" (帝具使いを斬る, Teigu tsukai o Kiru); 7. "Kill the Fantasy" (夢物語を斬る, Yume monogatari o Kiru); 8. "Kill the Evildoers" (溝鼠をを斬る, Dobunezumi o Kiru); 9. "Kill the Absolute Justice" (絶対正義を斬る, Zettai Seigi o Kiru)
Tatsumi and Akame go after Executioner Zanku, a mass murderer who beheads his victims. Tatsumi learns about Teigu, unique weapons and items that were fashioned for the old Emperor and infused with various powers; almost every Night Raid member has one, and so do many of their enemies. Zanku uses illusions to trick Tatsumi, but is ultimately defeated by Akame when he tries to project an illusion of Kurome and Akame strikes at him. Tatsumi becomes depressed when he realizes there is no Teigu that can bring back his friends, but is comforted by Sheele, who later trains him. Tatsumi and Leone go to a red light district to kill a man who had been enslaving women with drugs and prostitution. Tatsumi meets a garrison soldier named Seryu, who is hunting Night Raid members for killing her mentor Ogre. Seryu later fights Mine and Sheele using her Teigu, a creature named Koro. When Sheele dies in combat, An injured Mine to forced to escape when a dying Sheele uses her Teigu's Trump card, with Seryu laughing manically over Sheele's death
3	May 21, 2011	978-4-7575-3238-0	July 21, 2015	978-0-316-34004-5
10. "Kill the Sadness" (悲しみを斬る, Kanashimi o Kiru); 11. "Kill the Impostors" (偽者を斬る, Nisemono o Kiru); 12. "Kill the Three" (三匹を斬る, Sanbiki o Kiru); 13. "Kill Esdeath's Army (Part 1)" (エスデス軍を斬る（前編）, Esudesu-gun o Kiru (Zenpen)); 14. "Kill Esdeath's Army (Part 2)" (エスデス軍を斬る（後編）, Esudesu-gun o Kiru (Kōhen))
The Empire's strongest soldier, Esdeath, returns to the capital alongside her elite soldiers, the Three Beasts: Daidara, Nyau, and Liver. Tatsumi trains with Akame and Bulat. The Three Beasts go on a rash of killings of civil servants that were neutral to the empire, leaving fliers that credit Night Raid for the attacks. Tatsumi and Bulat board a ship to search for the assassins, while Leone abandons a possible attack on Esdeath in public when she senses the latter's aura. Tatsumi is then confronted by the Three Beasts, one of whom was Bulat's former superior. In the ensuing fight, Liver injects poison into his blood and uses it to kill himself and Bulat, who passes his Teigu, Incursio, to Tatsumi. Akame's sister Kurome is summoned to the capital.
4	January 21, 2012	978-4-7575-3482-7	October 27, 2015	978-0-3163-4005-2
15. "Kill the Suffering" (苦難を斬る, Kunan o Kiru); 16. "Kill the Combat Mania" (戦闘狂を斬る, Sentōkyō o Kiru); 17. "Kill the Bandits" (山賊を斬る, Sanzoku o Kiru); 18. "Kill the Seduction" (誘惑を斬る, Yūwaku o Kiru); 19. "Kill the Danger" (危機を斬る, Kiki o Kiru)
A young man named Wave moves to the Capital, where he meets several individuals including: Akame's sister Kurome; a masked man, Bols, a friendly angel named Run, a weird, quirky scientist known as Dr. Stylish, Seryu and Esdeath, who dubs the group the Jaegers. Esdeath, who has been searching for a man, falls in love with Tatsumi at a fighting tournament and captures him. Tatsumi tries to convince her to turn against the Empire, but she refuses. During a mission with the Jaegers, Tatsumi escapes, but Wave follows and comes across Incursio. Although he is defeated, Tatsumi escapes and returns to Night Raid where he reports his findings. Dr. Stylish tracks Night Raid's hideout and prepares an attack.
5	April 21, 2012	978-4-7575-3570-1	January 26, 2016	978-0-3163-4007-6
20. "Kill the Invaders" (侵入者を斬る, Shinnyūsha o Kiru); 21. "Kill the Mad Scientist" (マッドサイエンティストを斬る, Maddo Saientisuto o Kiru); 22. "Kill the Unexplored Territory" (秘境を斬る, Hikyō o Kiru); 23. "Kill the Newbies" (新入りを斬る, Shiniri o Kiru); Akame ga Kill! Special Arc
Dr. Stylish's subordinates storm Night Raid's hideout, but are eventually defeated when Najenda returns with two new Night Raid members: a minotaur-like humanoid Teigu called Susanoo, and the plaid-skirted master of disguise Chelsea. Dr. Stylish transforms into his true form (which is a giant Danger Beast), but is ultimately killed by Akame. With their base compromised, Night Raid hides out in the Marg Highlands to train and to get to know their new companions. In the special arc, three young girls are sold to the Capital, only to be ravaged and mutilated; their sole survivor asks for Night Raid's help to enact revenge.
6	September 22, 2012	978-4-7575-3736-1	April 26, 2016	978-0-3163-4008-3
24. "Kill the Danger Beasts" (危険種を斬る, Kikenshu o Kiru); 25. "Kill the Hindrances" (邪魔者を斬る, Jamamono o Kiru); 26. "Kill the Colossal Danger Beast" (巨大危険種を斬る, Kyodai Kikenshu o Kiru); 27. "Kill the Strong One" (強者を斬る, Kyōsha o Kiru); 28. "Kill the Religious Organization" (教団を斬る, Kyōdan o Kiru)
After settling at their new hideout, Night Raid is ordered to dispose of the Danger Beasts, but the Jaegers are also dispatched with the same purpose. During this occasion, Tatsumi and Esdeath meet once again and they are teleported to a deserted island by a mysterious Teigu user. During their time alone, Tatsumi learns the nature of Esdeath's Teigu and realizes that it is impossible to dissuade her. He manages to escape from her clutches once more after they find a way back. Some time later, Tatsumi and the others depart east to the city of Kyoroch, with orders to assassinate Bolic, a member of the religious cult "Path of Peace" that intends to seize its leadership for the Prime Minister's sake.
7	February 22, 2013	978-4-7575-3881-8	July 26, 2016	978-0-3163-4009-0
29. "Kill the Jeagers" (イェーガーズを斬る, Iēgāzu o Kiru); 30. "Kill the Puppets (Part 1)" (人形を斬る（前編）, Ningyō o Kiru (Zenpen)); 31. "Kill the Puppets (Part 2)" (人形を斬る（後編）, Ningyō o Kiru (Kōhen)); 32. "Kill the Curse" (呪縛を斬る, Jubaku o Kiru); 33. "Kill the Strengthened Human" (強化人間を斬る, Kyōka Ningen o Kiru)
On their way to Kyoroch, Night Raid ambush some members of the Jaegers and manage to kill Bols. Chelsea attempts to deceive and kill Kurome as well, but she fails to deliver a fatal blow and is killed by the Jaeger instead, with her Teigu destroyed.
8	July 22, 2013	978-4-7575-4011-8	October 25, 2016	978-0-3163-4011-3
Extra Chapter. (33.5) "Kill the Reminiscences" (追憶を斬る, Tsuioku o Kiru); 34. "Kill the Demon (Part 1)" (鬼を斬る（前編）, Oni o Kiru (Zenpen)); 35. "Kill the Demon (Part 2)" (鬼を斬る（後編）, Oni o Kiru (Kōhen)); 36. "Kill the Fate (Part 1)" (因縁を斬る（前編）, Innen o Kiru (Zenpen)); 37. "Kill the Fate (Part 2)" (因縁を斬る（中編）, Innen o Kiru (Chūhen)); 38. "Kill the Fate (Part 3)" (因縁を斬る（後編）, Innen o Kiru (Kōhen))
After having dreams of his fallen companions, Tatsumi and his friends finally arrive at their destination in order to accomplish their mission to assassinate Bolic, who sends his own special force, the Four Rakshasa Demons to hunt down Night Raid. They are all defeated by the assassins. Meanwhile, Seryu confronts Mine, she fatally wounds her and threatens to kill her with a suicide bomb, but she is saved by Tatsumi.
9	January 22, 2014	978-4-7575-4206-8	January 24, 2017	978-0-316-3-4012-0
39. "Kill the Trauma" (トラウマを斬る, Torauma o Kiru); 40. "Kill the Ambition" (野望を斬る, Yabō o Kiru); 41. "Kill the Evil" (邪悪を斬る, Jaaku o Kiru); 42. "Kill the Despair (Part 1)" (絶望を斬る（前編）, Zetsubō o Kiru (Zenpen)); 43. "Kill the Despair (Part 2)" (絶望を斬る（後編）, Zetsubō o Kiru (Kōhen))
With the Four Rakshasa Demons defeated, Esdeath and the remaining Jaegers stand guard to protect Bolic from Night Raid's attack. Despite fighting together, Tatsumi and his friends are no match for Esdeath. After Akame finally succeeds in assassinating Bolic, Susanoo sacrifices himself to allow his companions to escape.
10	June 21, 2014	978-4-7575-4338-6	April 18, 2017	978-0-3164-6930-2
44. "Kill the Hesitation" (躊躇いを斬る, Tamerai o Kiru); 45. "Kill the Heresy (Part 1)" (外道を斬る（前編）, Gedō o Kiru (Zenpen)); 46. "Kill the Heresy (Part 2)" (外道を斬る（後編）, Gedō o Kiru (Kōhen)); 47. "Kill the Foe (Part 1)" (仇を斬る（前編）, Kataki o Kiru (Zenpen)); 48. "Kill the Foe (Part 2)" (仇を斬る（後編）, Kataki o Kiru (Kōhen))
Back at the Capital, Lord Syura, the son of the Prime Minister, assembles another team of Teigu wielding assassins called "Wild Hunt", that starts committing several atrocities with the purpose of drawing Night Raid's attention. Meanwhile, Mine confesses her feelings to Tatsumi and they start dating. Having a score to settle with one of the members of Wild Hunt, Run draws him to a trap that leads to a stand off between members of Night Raid, Wild Hunt and the Jaegers. In the end, Run enacts his revenge, but dies from his injuries and is revived as one of Kurome's puppets, while Tatsumi and the others kill another member of Wild Hunt and severely wound a third one while retrieving their Teigu.
1.5	October 27, 2014	978-4-7575-4206-8	—	—
Extra Chapter 1 (7.5). "Kill the Blackness" (暗黒を斬る, Ankoku o Kiru); Extra Chapter 2 (6.5). "Kill the Mad Swordsman" (剣鬼を斬る, Kenki o Kiru)
11	December 22, 2014	978-4-7575-4505-2	July 18, 2017	978-0-3164-3960-2
49. "Kill the Stray" (迷いを斬る, Mayoi o Kiru); 50. "Kill the Disaster" (難局を斬る, Nankyoku o Kiru); 51. "Kill the Love" (恋慕を斬る, Renbo o Kiru); 52. "Kill the Carnage" (修羅を斬る, Shura o Kiru); 53. "Kill the Adversity (Part 1)" (逆境を斬る（前編）, Gyakkyō o Kiru (Zenpen)); 54. "Kill the Adversity (Part 2)" (逆境を斬る（後編）, Gyakkyō o Kiru (Kōhen))
During a covert mission, Tatsumi and Lubbock are captured by Syura, who intends to make amends for his team's failures, but Wild Hunt is disbanded after Esdeath exposes his past crimes. While interrogating Lubbock, Syura is killed by him. While attempting to escape, Lubbock is killed by a member of Wild Hunt and Tatsumi is captured soon after. Shortly thereafter, Esdeath visited Tatsumi, and after refusing to join her side, Tatsumi is sentenced to death. When the time for his execution comes, his companions from Night Raid appear to rescue him.
12	July 22, 2015	978-4-7575-4693-6	October 31, 2017	978-0-3164-7332-3
55. "Kill the Top Two" (二強を斬る, Nikyō o Kiru); 56. "Kill the Great General" (大将軍を斬る, Daishōgun o Kiru); 57. "Kill the Alchemist" (錬金術師を斬る, Renkinjutsu-shi o Kiru); 58. "Kill the Skilled" (手練れを斬る, Tedare o Kiru); 59. "Kill Your Assumptions" (思い込みを斬る, Omoikomi o Kiru); 60. "Kill the Wild Hunt" (ワイルドハントを斬る, Wairudohanto o Kiru)
The members of Night Raid succeed not only in rescuing Tatsumi, but in taking down Budo, considered the Empire's strongest general. However, Mine's battle against Budo causes her Teigu to be destroyed, and takes such a toll to her body and mind that she falls into a comatose state. To make matters worse, Tatsumi is informed that his body is slowly being taken over by Incursio every time he uses it, and it will take only a few more uses for him to become completely possessed by his Teigu. Despite that, he joins Akame and Leone in a successful mission that ends with them ambushing and killing the last three members of Wild Hunt.
13	January 22, 2016	978-4-7575-4863-3	January 30, 2018	978-0-3164-7335-4
61. "Kill the Reinforcements" (援軍を斬る, Engun o Kiru); 62. "Kill the Past (Part 1)" (過去を斬る（前編）, Kako o Kiru (Zenpen)); 63. "Kill the Past (Part 2)" (過去を斬る（後編）, Kako o Kiru (Kōhen)); 64. "Kill the Little Sister (Part 1)" (妹を斬る（前編）, Imōto o Kiru (Zenpen)); 65. "Kill the Little Sister (Part 2)" (妹を斬る（後編）, Imōto o Kiru (Kōhen)); 66. "Kill the Fate" (因果を斬る, Inga o Kiru)
As the Revolutionary Army surrounds the capital, the members of Night Raid occupy themselves with disrupting the Empire's chain of command further by killing as much of their top echelons as they can, except for Tatsumi, who suffers from the side effects of the transformations. Meanwhile, Esdeath routs the attackers with the power of her Teigu. After nearly losing his life to Akame in battle, Wave decides to look for a way to stop her impending showdown with Kurome, to no avail. As the two sisters clash, Wave confronts Tatsumi, who wants to stop him from interfering, but he outmatches Tatsumi by achieving the never seen before feat of using two Teigu simultaneously. After stopping the duel, Wave declares his love for Kurome and convinces her to flee with him, so they can live peacefully together until the war is over.
14	August 22, 2016	978-4-7575-5080-3	April 24, 2018	978-1-9753-0041-8
67. "Kill the Darkness" (晦冥を斬る, Kaimei o Kiru); 68. "Kill the Source" (元凶を斬る, Genkyō o Kiru); 69. "Kill the Bedlam (Part 1)" (混戦を斬る（前編）, Konsen o Kiru (Zenpen)); 70. "Kill the Bedlam (Part 2)" (混戦を斬る（後編）, Konsen o Kiru (Kōhen)); 71. "Kill the Great Enemy" (大敵を斬る, Daiteki o Kiru); 72. "Kill the Root" (根源を斬る, Kongen o Kiru)
The Revolutionary Army begins their attack on the capital, but they face a fierce counterattack from Esdeath and her forces. Meanwhile, Akame and Leone storm the palace to kill the Prime Minister. Leone confronts Honest, but is defeated when he uses the power of his own Teigu to break hers. To crush the Revolutionary Army, the Emperor himself joins the battle with his own Teigu, Shikoutazer, a towering suit of armor with massive firepower. When the Emperor loses his self-control and starts attacking friend and foe alike with Shikoutazer's power, Tatsumi launches to stop him.
15	February 22, 2017	978-4-7575-5249-4	July 24, 2018	978-1-9753-0044-9
73. "Kill the Supreme" (至高を斬る, Shikō o Kiru); 74. "Kill the Supreme (Part 2)" (至高を斬る（後編）, Shikō o Kiru (Kōhen)) (Note: When released in tankōbon 15, chapter 74 was renamed from "Kill the Emperor" (皇帝を斬る, Kōtei o Kiru) to "Kill the Supreme (Part 2)" (至高を斬る（後編）, Shikō o Kiru (Kōhen)).); 75. "Kill Esdeath (Part 1)" (エスデスを斬る（前編）, Esudesu o Kiru (Zenpen)); 76. "Kill Esdeath (Part 2)" (エスデスを斬る（中編）, Esudesu o Kiru (Chūhen)); 77. "Kill Esdeath (Part 3)" (エスデスを斬る（後編）, Esudesu o Kiru (Kōhen)); Final chapter. "Akame ga Kill" (アカメが斬る, Akame ga Kiru)
After Tatsumi defeats the supreme teigu with Wave's help, he is fused with Incursio and becomes a reborn Tyrant. Akame at first "kills" him which causes her to unleash Murasame's trump card, but actually killed the Dragon's soul. Both Akame and Esdeath battle a brutal fight which ends with Akame piercing Esdeath's chest with a broken Murasame. Esdeath freezes herself and shatters, Honest is fatally wounded by a fused Leone and the Revolutionary Army executes Honest, freeing the people from his tyranny while Leone dies peacefully. The Emperor is also executed. Mine and Tatsumi have a child together. Akame leaves on a journey hoping one day they will be able to fulfil their dream of sailing the world together.
1.5	December 25, 2017	978-4-7575-5566-2	—	—
Extra Chapter 1 (7.5). "Kill the Blackness" (暗黒を斬る, Ankoku o Kiru); Extra Chapter 2 (6.5). "Kill the Mad Swordsman" (剣鬼を斬る, Kenki o Kiru); Extra Chapter 3 (7.8). "Kill the Evil" (悪を斬る, Aku o Kiru); Extra Chapter 4 (78.5). "Kill the Sorrow" (憂いを斬る, Urei o Kiru)

== Akame ga Kill! Zero ==
No.	Original release date	Original ISBN	English release date	English ISBN
1	June 21, 2014	978-4-7575-4339-3	March 22, 2016	978-0-3163-1468-8
01. "The Two Girls" (二人の少女, Futari no Shōjo); 02. "The Day it Began" (はじまりの日, Hajimari no Hi); 03. "First Mission (Part 1)" (初任務（前編）, Hatsu Ninmu (Zenpen)); 04. "First Mission (Part 2)" (初任務（後編）, Hatsu Ninmu (Kōhen)); 05. "Raised in Darkness" (闇に育つ, Yami ni Sodatsu); 06. "Hurdle! The Viceroy Murder" (難関！ 太守殺し, Nankan! Taishu Goroshi)
2	December 22, 2014	978-4-7575-4506-9	June 28, 2016	978-0-3162-7228-5
07. "The Battle of Hakurou River" (白狼河の戦い, Hakuro Kawa no Tatakai); 08. "Chance Meeting" (巡り会い, Meguriai); 09. "Assassins" (殺し屋たち, Koroshiya-tachi); 10. "Fight to the Death (Part 1)" (死戦（前編）, Shitō (Zenpen)); 11. "Fight to the Death (Part 2)" (死戦（後編）, Shitō (Kōhen)); 12. "First Casualty" (慟哭, Dōkoku); 13. "Clash of the Best" (頂上対決, Chōjō Taiketsu)
3	July 22, 2015	978-4-7575-4694-3	September 27, 2016	978-0-3163-9786-5
14. "Remains" (遺跡, Iseki); 15. "Mysteries" (秘術, Hijutsu); 16. "Yearning" (思幕, Shibo); 17. "Plunge" (突入, Totsunyū); 18. "Melee" (混戦, Konsen); 19. "Number 1" (No.1, Nanbā Wan); 20. "Length" (長, Osa)
4	January 22, 2016	978-4-7575-4864-0	December 20, 2016	978-0-3164-3423-2
21. "Inheritance" (受け継がれていくもの, Uketsuga rete Iku Mono); 22. "Sisters" (姉妹, Shimai); 23. "Truth" (真実, Shinjitsu); 24. "Escape" (脱出, Dasshutsu); 25. "Another Meeting of Light and Shadow" (再会の光と影, Saikai no Hikari to Kage)
5	August 22, 2016	978-4-7575-5081-0	March 21, 2017	978-0-3164-6921-0
26. "To Each His Own Love" (愛それぞれ, Ai sorezore); 27. "Confession" (告白, Kokuhaku); 28. "Creeping Shadows" (忍び寄る影, Shinobiyoru Kage); 29. "Assault" (強襲, Kyōshū); 30. "Fierce Attack Oarburgh" (猛攻オールベルグ, Mōkō Ōruberugu); 31. "Life Or Death" (死線, Shisen)
6	February 22, 2017	978-4-7575-5250-0	December 19, 2017	978-0-3164-1414-2
32. "Respectively Fierce Fighting" (それぞれの激闘, Sorezore no Gekitō); 33. "The Strongest Opportunity" (最強の隙, Saikyō no Suki); 34. "World's Truth (Part 1)" (世界の真実（前編）, Sekai no Shinjitsu (Zenpen)); 35. "World's Truth (Part 2)" (世界の真実（後編）, Sekai no Shinjitsu (Kōhen)); 36. "The Coming Future" (やがてくる未来, Yagate kuru Mirai); 37. "Right Love" (正しい恋愛, Tadashī Ren'ai)
7	August 25, 2017	978-4-7575-5457-3	June 5, 2018	978-1-9753-2647-0
38. "Justice Place" (正義の在処, Seigi no Arika); 39. "Assassination Instructions" (暗殺指南, Ansatsu Shinan); 40. "The Fist of Love" (献身, Kenshin); 41. "Rise of the Rakasha Demons" (月下の乱戦, Gekka no Ransen); 42. "The End of Grim Reaper" (死神の終焉, Shinigami no Shūen)
8	December 25, 2017	978-4-7575-5564-8	November 13, 2018	978-1-9753-2803-0
43. "Word to the Imperial Capital" (帝都にて, Teito nite); 44. "Dialogue" (対話, Taiwa); 45. "Resentment" (怨恨, Enkon); 46. "Encounter" (邂逅, Kaikō); 47. "At the End of Hatred" (憎悪の果てに, Zōo no Hate ni)
9	August 25, 2018	978-4-7575-5827-4	April 30, 2019	978-1-9753-3026-2
48. "Teigu" (帝具, Teigu); 49. "Purge Disaster (Part 1)" (粛清の惨渦（前編）, Shukusei no Sanka (Zenpen)); 50. "Purge Disaster (Part 2)" (粛清の惨渦（後編）, Shukusei no Sanka (Kōhen)); 51. "Encounter with Najenda" (ナジェンダとの出会い, Najenda to no Deai); 52. "Signpost (Part 1)" (道標（前編）, Dōhyō (Zenpen)); 53. "Signpost (Part 2)" (道標（後編）, Dōhyō (Kōhen)); 54. "Fatefull Night" (運命の夜, Unmei no Yoru)
10	April 25, 2019	978-4-7575-6104-5	October 29, 2019	978-1-9753-5851-8
55. "Parting" (決別, Ketsubetsu); 56. "Parent & Child" (親と子と, Oya to Ko to); 57. "The End of the Elite" (選抜組の結末, Senbatsu-gumi no Ketsumatsu); 58. "Night Raid" (ナイトレイド, NaitoReido); 59. "Accelerating Madness" (加速する狂気, Kasoku suru Kyōki); Final Chapter. "The End of Zero" (零の終焉, Zero no Shūen)

== Hinowa ga Crush! ==
No.	Original release date	Original ISBN	English release date	English ISBN
1	December 25, 2017	978-4-7575-5565-5	September 25, 2018	978-1-9753-8095-3
1. "Battle of Castle Ryumon" (竜門城の戦い, Ryūmonjō no Tatakai); 2. "In Yaenami Village" (八重波村にて, Yaenami-mura nite); 3. "The Class and The Elder" (塾と仙人, Juku to Sennin); 4. "First Battle" (初陣, Uijin); 5. "The Fight on Mt. Kageboshi" (影法師山の戦い, Kagebōshizan no Tatakai)
2	August 25, 2018	978-4-7575-5828-1	May 21, 2019	978-1-9753-3041-5
6. "Tears (Part 1)" (涙（前編）, Namida (Zenpen)); 7. "Tears (Part 2)" (涙（後編）, Namida (Kōhen)); 8. "Meihou" (冥宝, Meihō); 9. "A New Battle" (新たなる戦, Aratanaru Ikusa); 10. "Battle at Shiranui Fortress" (不知火砦の戦い, Shiranui Toride no Tatakai); 11. "Feelings" (想い, Omoi)
3	April 25, 2019	978-4-7575-6105-2	January 7, 2020	978-1-9753-8751-8
12. "Captain" (足軽子頭, Ashigaru Kogashira); 13. "Rinzu (Part 1)" (リンズ（前編）, Rinzu (Zenpen)); 14. "Rinzu (Part 2)" (リンズ（後編）, Rinzu (Kōhen)); 15. "Beating Kyoukotsu" (キョウコツを討つ, Kyōkotsu o Utsu); 16. "The Battle Fort Shiranui Come To A Close" (不知火砦の決着, Shiranui Toride no Kecchaku); 17. "After the Battle" (戦の後で…, Ikusa no Ato de …)
4	December 25, 2019	978-4-7575-6449-7	August 18, 2020	978-1-9753-1516-0
18. "The Tenrou Nation" (天狼国, Tenrōkoku); 19. "The Invasion of Uminari Island" (海鳴島侵攻戦, Uminarijima Shinkō sen); 20. "The Foot Soldier" (足軽（前編）, Ashigaru (Zenpen)); 21. "The Foot Soldier (Part 2)" (足軽（後編）, Ashigaru (Kōhen)); 22. "Premonition of a Coming Storm" (嵐の予感, Arashi no Yokan); 23. "Rinzu's Bridegroom" (リンズの花婿（前編）, Rinzu no Hanamuko (Zenpen)); 24. "Rinzu's Bridegroom (Part 2)" (リンズの花婿（後編）, Rinzu no Hanamuko (Kōhen))
5	August 25, 2020	978-4-7575-6814-3	June 1, 2021	978-1-9753-2458-2
25. "Happy Times, and Then" (幸せの時、そして, Shiawase no toki, soshite); 26. "Invasion of the Hungry Wolves" (餓狼の侵攻, Garō no Shinkō); 27. "The Soukai Nation Fights Hard" (激戦蒼海国, Gekisen Sōkai Koku); 28. "Siege on Nagisa Castle" (渚城包囲（前編）, Nagisa-jō Hōi(Zenpen)); 29. "Siege on Nagisa Castle (part 2)" (渚城包囲（後編）, Nagisa-jō Hōi (Kōhen)); 30. "The Battle at Nagisa Castle" (渚城の戦い, Nagisa-jō no Tatakai); 31. "A Short-Lived Dream" (うたかたの夢（前編）, Utakata no yume (Zenpen)); 32. "A Short-Lived Dream (Part 2)" (うたかたの夢（後編）, Utakata no yume (Kōhen))
6	March 25, 2021	978-4-7575-7171-6	April 26, 2022	978-1-9753-3818-3
33. "The Tragedy of Rinzu" (リンズ無惨, Rinzu Muzan); 34. "The Revitalizing Blade" (蘇る刃, Yomigaeru Yaiba); 35. "The Reunion of Fresh Blood" (鮮血の再会, Senketsu no Saikai); 36. "The Line Between Life and Death" (死線, Shisen); 37. "A Diverging Path" (別れ道, Wakare Michi); 38. "The Day a Demon was Born" (鬼が生まれた日, Oni ga Umareta hi)
7	December 25, 2021	978-4-7575-7657-5	February 21, 2023	978-1-97-536127-3
39. "Roaming..." (流れ行きて…, Nagare Ikite...); 40. "Rugyou and Mekira" (ルギョウとメキラ, Rugyō to Mekira); 41. "Resolve" (決意, Ketsui); 42. "To the East..." (東へ…, Higashi e...); 43. "A Nostalgic Face" (懐かしい顔, Natsukashī Kao); 44. "In Black Lake Nation" (黒潮国にて, Kuroshio koku Nite); 45. "The Situation with the Eastern Countries" (東国の事情, Tōgoku no Jijō)
8	August 25, 2022	978-4-7575-8093-0	July 18, 2023	978-1-9753-7165-4
46. "The King of Tsutsuji" (躑躅国王, Tsutsuji Kokuō); 47. "Flying Her Flag" (旗揚げ, Hata age); 48. "Building a Foothold" (地盤固め, Jiban Katame); 49. "Vows" (契り, Chigiri); 50. "The Outbreak of War" (開戦, Kaisen); 51. "Until I'm a General" (将になるまで, Shō ni Naru Made); 52. "Day of the Decisive Battle" (決戦の日, Kessen no Hi); 53. "The Land of the Sun" (日輪の国, Nichirin no Kuni)
