= David Wald =

American voice actor

- Education: University of Miami
- Occupation: Voice actor

David Wald is an American voice actor who voices in English dubs of Japanese anime. Some of his major roles include: Gajeel Redfox in Fairy Tail, Hannes in Attack on Titan, Bulat in Akame ga Kill!, and Master Chief in Halo Legends. He is involved in productions for Funimation and ADV Films (now Seraphim Digital and Sentai Filmworks) in Texas. He is gay and advocates bringing positive queer representation in dubbed anime. He served as ADR director for Sentai Filmworks dubs of yuri and yaoi titles: Love Stage, Bloom into You, Hitorijime My Hero, and Kase-san and Morning Glories.

In October 2024, Wald accused Crunchyroll of opening his private mail, throwing away letters and distributing included items to staff. A Crunchyroll spokesperson said the company was investigating. Wald said the following month that he would depart his role in Fairy Tail and would not return to Crunchyroll's studio.

== Filmography ==
=== Anime ===
List of voice performances in anime
| Year | Title | Role | Crew role, notes | Source |
|---|---|---|---|---|
| 2005 | Shadow Skill | Various characters | | Resume |
| 2007 | Innocent Venus | Various characters | | Resume |
| 2007 | Air Gear | Mitsuru Bando, Masaya Orihara, others | | Resume |
| 2007 | Welcome to the NHK | Various characters | | Resume, CA |
| 2010 | Golgo 13 | Golgo 13 | | |
| 2010 | Legends of the Dark King | Toki | | |
| 2011 | Guin Saga | Guin | | CA |
| 2011–12 | Fullmetal Alchemist: Brotherhood | Charlie | | |
| 2012–19 | Fairy Tail | Gajeel Redfox | | |
| 2012 | Hakuōki | Isami Kondou | | |
| 2011 | Mardock Scramble: The First Compression | Dimsdale Boiled | | |
| 2012 | Psycho-Pass | Choe Gu-sung | | |
| 2012 | Shiki | Toshio Ozaki | | |
| 2013 | Toriko | Teppei | | |
| 2013 | Sankarea: Undying Love | Dan'ichirō Sanka (Rea's Father) | | |
| 2013 | Phi-Brain | Kaito Daimon | | |
| 2013 | Rurouni Kenshin: New Kyoto Arc | Shishio Makoto | | |
| 2013 | Problem Children Are Coming from Another World, Aren't They? | Galdo Gaspar | | |
| 2014–17 | Attack on Titan | Hannes | | |
| 2014–16 | Gatchaman Crowds | Berg Katze | Also Insight in 2016 | |
| 2014 | Diabolik Lovers | Reiji Sakamaki | | |
| 2015 | Dog & Scissors | Munakata, Daimon | | |
| 2015 | Unbreakable Machine-Doll | Sigmund | | |
| 2015 | SoniAni: Super Sonico The Animation | Manager Kitamura | | |
| 2015 | Akame ga Kill! | Bulat | | |
| 2015 | Shimoneta | Raiki Gouriki | | |
| 2016 | Hanayamata | Naru's Father | | |
| 2016 | Wizard Barristers | Mitsuhisa Hachiya | | |
| 2016 | Brothers Conflict | Rintaro Hinata | | |
| 2016–24 | My Hero Academia | Tetsutetsu, Snipe | | |
| 2016 | Garo: The Animation | German Luis | | |
| 2016 | Tales of Zestiria the X | Artorius Collbrande | | |
| 2016 | Izetta: The Last Witch | Lord Redford | Succeeded Cole Brown due to his death | |
| 2016 | Is It Wrong to Try to Pick Up Girls in a Dungeon? | Welf Crozzo | | |
| 2016 | The Disastrous Life of Saiki K. | Riki Nendou, Midori Nendou, Takeuchi Nendou, Baron Cola | | |
| 2016 | Monster Hunter Stories: Ride On | Dan | | |
| 2016 | Touken Ranbu: Hanamaru | Sengo Muramasa | | |
| 2017 | Saga of Tanya the Evil | Geoffrey | | |
| 2017 | Amagi Brilliant Park | Dornell | | |
| 2017 | Akashic Records of Bastard Magic Instructor | Zelos Draghart | | |
| 2017 | The Royal Tutor | Viktor von Glanzreich | | |
| 2017 | Alice & Zoroku | Mr. Miho | | |
| 2017 | Sakura Quest | Kazushi | | |
| 2017 | Gosick | Albert de Blois | | |
| 2017 | Gate | Yoji Itami | | |
| 2017 | School-Live! | Reporter | | |
| 2017–20 | Food Wars!: Shokugeki no Soma | Donato Gotoda | | |
| 2017 | Konohana Kitan | Entertainment God B | | |
| 2017 | Kino's Journey —the Beautiful World— the Animated Series | Motorrad | | |
| 2017 | Star Blazers: Space Battleship Yamato 2199 | Wolf Flaken | | |
| 2017–22 | Haikyu!! | Coach Keishin Ukai | | |
| 2017 | Diabolik Lovers: More, blood | Reiji Sakamaki | | |
| 2018–24 | One Piece | Paulie, Baron Tamago | | |
| 2018 | UQ Holder! | Albireo Imma | | |
| 2018 | Golden Kamuy | Lieutenant Tsurumi | | |
| 2018 | Black Clover | Vetto | | |
| 2018 | Overlord | Shasuryu Shasha | | |
| 2018 | Flip Flappers | Salt | | |
| 2018 | This Boy is a Professional Wizard | Zaou | | |
| 2018 | Princess Principal | L | | |
| 2018 | That Time I Got Reincarnated as a Slime | Veryard | | |
| 2019 | Dragon Ball Super | Napapa, Hyssop | | |
| 2019 | YU-NO: A Girl Who Chants Love at the Bound of this World | Kozo Ryuzoji | | |
| 2019 | Kono Oto Tomare! Sounds of Life | Takagi | | |
| 2019 | Cutie Honey Universe | Alphonne | | |
| 2019 | Knights of the Zodiac: Saint Seiya | Gunmen, Commander, Black Knights | | |
| 2019 | Ensemble Stars! | Nagisa Ran | | |
| 2019 | Actors: Songs Connection | Usuki | | |
| 2020 | Plunderer | Alexandrov Grigorovich / Alan | | |
| 2020 | Thermae Romae Novae | Lucius Modestus | | |
| 2020 | Shirobako | Masahiro Ōkura | | |
| 2020 | Arte | Arte's Father | | |
| 2021 | Gleipnir | Madoka | | |
| 2021 | SK8 the Infinity | Ainosuke Shindo / Adam | | |
| 2021 | Dragon Goes House-Hunting | Samuel | Assistant ADR Director | |
| 2021 | Dororo | Daigo Kagemitsu | | |
| 2021 | Suppose a Kid from the Last Dungeon Boonies Moved to a Starter Town | Gluco | | |
| 2021 | The Stranger by the Shore | Shun's Dad | ADR Director | |
| 2021 | The Saint's Magic Power Is Omnipotent | Dominic Goltz | | |
| 2021 | Moriarty the Patriot | MP Spencer | | |
| 2021 | Vinland Saga | Askeladd | Sentai Filmworks Dub | |
| 2021 | Kageki Shoujo!! | Onodera | | |
| 2021 | The Case Study of Vanitas | Astolfo's Father | ADR Director | |
| 2021 | Ranking of Kings | Zokku | | |
| 2022 | The Dawn of the Witch | Holdem | | |
| 2023 | Urusei Yatsura | Onsen-Mark | | |
| 2023 | Farming Life in Another World | God | | |
| 2024 | The Wrong Way to Use Healing Magic | Tong | | |
| 2024 | Helck | The Human King | | |
| 2024 | A Journey Through Another World | Johan, "Guild Master" | | |
| 2024 | Fairy Tail: 100 Years Quest | Gajeel Redfox | Last role involved with Crunchyroll due to allegations of mail theft. | |
| 2024 | Delico's Nursery | Julas | | |
| 2024 | Natsume's Book of Friends | Hyakko | | |
| 2024 | Dungeon People | Reilmond | | |

List of voice performances in feature films
| Year | Title | Role | Crew role, notes | Source |
|---|---|---|---|---|
| 2012 | Gintama: The Movie | Shouyou Yoshida, Isao Kondo, Jintetsu Murata | Sentai Filmworks Dub | |
| 2013 | Fairy Tail the Movie: Phoenix Priestess | Gajeel Redfox | | |
| 2015 | Ghost in the Shell: The New Movie | Raizo | limited theatrical release | |
| 2017 | Shin Godzilla | Tanba | Direct-to-Video | |
| 2017 | Fairy Tail: Dragon Cry | Gajeel Redfox | | |
| 2017 | Genocidal Organ | Lucius | | |
| 2019 | Human Lost | Atsugi | | |
| 2019 | Is It Wrong to Try to Pick Up Girls in a Dungeon?: Arrow of the Orion | Welf Crozzo | | |
| 2020 | City Hunter: Shinjuku Private Eyes | Junichi Sakai | | |
| 2021 | Gintama: The Very Final | Isao Kondo | | |
| 2022 | Sing a Bit of Harmony | Saijo | | |
| 2022 | Princess Principal: Crown Handler - Chapter 1 | L | | |
| 2023 | Legend of Raoh: Chapter of Death in Love | Toki | | |

== Awards ==
| Year | Award | Category | Work/Recipient | Result | Ref |
|---|---|---|---|---|---|
| 2019 | 3rd Crunchyroll Anime Awards | Best Voice Artist Performance (English) | Narrator (Mr. Tonegawa: Middle Management Blues) | Nominated | |
| 2022 | 6th Crunchyroll Anime Awards | Best Voice Artist Performance (English) | Ainosuke Shindo/Adam (SK8 the Infinity) | Won | |
