= List of Akame ga Kill! characters =

The original members of Night Raid, left to right: Tatsumi, Mine, Leone, Najenda, Sheele, Lubbock, Akame and Bulat

The Akame ga Kill! manga and anime series features an extensive cast of fictional characters. The visuals of the characters were designed by Tetsuya Tashiro, while their stories were created by Takahiro. The story focuses on Tatsumi, a young warrior who joins an assassin group called Night Raid to fight corruption from the Empire. Its members, along with other characters in the series, wield super weapons called Teigu (帝具; Anime & movie: Imperial Arms).^{[ch. 5]}

== Conception ==
In 2007, Takahiro was asked to do a manga for Square Enix magazine. He originally came up with the idea of an "all-female band of assassins, and the protagonist is a boy who is captured by them and has to work for them." After his editor approved the idea, he waited on serialization until his company had stabilized and had released two other titles, during which he developed the characters, story and the world they exist in. In August 2009, following the release of Majikoi - Oh! Samurai Girls, Takahiro looked for an artist for the serialization, and recruited Tashiro Tetsuya to do the illustrations. He liked Tashiro's ability to draw cute girls and fast-paced action scenes.^{[vol. 1:postscript]}

Takahiro has written additional background information and profiles about some of the characters in the postscripts of the volume compilations, such as for the Three Beasts^{[vol. 3:postscript]} and the Jaegers.^{[vol. 4:postscript]} The Danger Beasts (危険種, kikenshu) were conceived to be any creature that attacks the humans in the world and are similar to monsters seen in role-playing games with different classifications from Class 4 to Class 1, and Special and Super Class designations at the top for the legendary beasts.^{[vol. 5:postscript]}

== Night Raid ==
The main characters are members of Night Raid, a team of assassins who help the Revolutionary Army's efforts to overthrow the corrupt prime minister and restore peace and order to the Empire.^{[vol. 1]}

=== Tatsumi ===
Voiced by: Sōma Saitō (Japanese); Corey Hartzog (English)

Tatsumi (タツミ) the male protagonist of the series, a teenage swordsman who sets out to the capital city to raise money for his impoverished village. He has brown hair and green eyes. Separated from his two companions, Tatsumi is swindled of his money, but is taken in by a girl with a wealthy upbringing.^{[ch. 1]} When he tries to defend that girl from Night Raid, he soon discovers that the girl had actually tortured and killed his comrades, so he kills her and is recruited to join Night Raid,^{[ch. 1]} He accepts, as their actions of fighting corruption would eventually help his village.^{[ch. 2]} His primary weapon is a short dagger, but he later inherits Bulat's Teigu after his death; "Demon Armor: Incursio" (悪鬼纏身 インクルシオ, Akki Tenshin: Inkurushio), which is a armor created from the still living flesh of a dragon-like Danger Beast called Tyrant. While normally a short sword, Incursio can form armor around the user and grant them powers such as invisibility and superhuman strength; in addition, the armor can evolve due to Tyrant's innate adaptive ability, improving itself to better protect the user.^{[ch. 5, 14]} However, Tatsumi got seriously damaged during his battle against emperor, which results in his death. In the manga, Tatsumi survives the battle, but he has fused with Incursio and become a dragon.

=== Akame ===
Voiced by: Sora Amamiya (Japanese); Molly Searcy (English)

Akame (アカメ) is the titular female protagonist of the story. She has long black hair, red eyes, and a cold, serious demeanor. Sold along with her sister Kurome to the Empire at a young age, she becomes one of the Elite Seven assassins under Gozuki.^{[ch. 3]} Despite her serious attitude in battle, she displays genuine concern for her comrades.^{[ch. 3, 6]}^{[vol. 3]} During a mission to assassinate former general Najenda, she is convinced by the latter to join Night Raid and the cause against the Empire.^{[ch. 3]} Her treason sparks an intense rivalry between fellow assassin and sibling Kurome, along with a mutual desire to be the one to end the other.^{[ch. 6]} In Night Raid, she assumes the cooking duties prior to Tatsumi joining the group.^{[ch. 2, 3]} While she originally used the Shingu "Kiriichimonji", a katana capable of inflicting wounds that never heal, Akame acquired Gozuki's Imperial Arm "One Slice Kill: Murasame" (一斬必殺 村雨, Ichizan Hissatsu: Murasame) whose poison blade instantly kills whoever it cuts.^{[ch. 5]} During the final battle with Esdeath, as a final resort due to the method of activation, Akame activates Murasame's Little War Horn Trump Card to permanently boost her physical abilities by increasing her density so she can kill Esdeath.^{[ch. 76, 77]} Following the revolution, still an assassin, Akame leaves the empire to deal with those in neighboring nations that might take advantage of the weakened government.^{[ch. 78]}

=== Mine ===
Voiced by: Yukari Tamura (Japanese); Christina Kelly (English)

Mine (マイン, Main) serves as the sniper of Night Raid. She has pink hair styled in twin tails and pink eyes. She initially shows a cold exterior and hates Tatsumi after he joined the group, but warms up to Tatsumi after he rescues her from Seryu's suicide nuclear bombing attack.^{[vol. 1]} In her childhood, she suffered harsh discrimination and racism for her half-foreign blood during her childhood; she ran away with joining the Revolutionary Army with hopes that when Army wins, there will be more acceptance of different races.^{[ch. 4]} Mine's Teigu is a machine gun called the "Roman Artillery: Pumpkin" (浪漫砲台 パンプキン, Roman Hōdai: Panpukin) that fires highly concentrated piercing shots of spirit energy.^{[ch. 2,5]} Her powers are amplified based on her emotions, such as anger while fighting in a tight situation.^{[ch. 20]} Later on, Mine dies after sacrificing Pumpkin to defeat Budo during Night Raid's mission to rescue Tatsumi, Tatsumi promises her to carry out her goal to come out on top.

=== Leone ===
Voiced by: Yū Asakawa (Japanese); Allison Keith (English)

Leone (レオーネ, Reōne) has short blonde hair and a voluptuous chest. She has a very relaxed and cheerful personality. She acts like a big sister towards Tatsumi, whom she swindled at the start of the series.^{[ch. 1,8]} As part of Night Raid, she gathers intelligence and corroborates the mission requests. Her Imperial Arm is "King of Beasts Transformation: Lionel" (百獣王化 ライオネル, Hyakujū Ōka: Raioneru), a belt she acquired from the black market that transforms her into a kemonomimi with increased strength and abilities as well as enhanced senses such as smell^{[ch. 1,5,10]} and regeneration.^{[ch. 21]} She originally became an assassin when she killed an aristocrat that made a game out of trampling poor kids with his horse.^{[ch. 10]} During the final battle against the Empire, Leone is mortally wounded by Prime Minister Honest, but she corners him nonetheless. She then punches his face until his face is completely broken so that she can pay back all the torture he's caused. She uses what is left of her life to visit her old drinking friends before dying peacefully on the street where she met Tatsumi with a satisfied smile.^{[ch. 78]}

=== Sheele ===
Voiced by: Mamiko Noto (Japanese); Jessica Boone (English)

Sheele (シェーレ, Shēre) has dark purple hair with part of it styled in a single bun, and wears glasses. Growing up in the low districts of the Capital, Sheele first discovers her abilities as an assassin when she rescues her only friend by killing her abusive ex-boyfriend. When a gang related to the boyfriend seeks to avenge her, killing her parents in the process, she easily murders them. Eventually, she joins the Revolutionary Army and later, Night Raid. Despite being an experienced assassin, she does not have regular duties at Night Raid as she tends to be air-headed and clumsy at cooking and cleaning.^{[ch. 5,7]} Her Teigu is the "Slice All: Extase" (万物両断 エクスタス, Banbutsu Ryōdan: Ekusutasu), a huge pair of scissors that easily severs anything in half.^{[ch. 1,5]} She is killed in a battle against Seryu when the latter immobilizes her and upper torso is devoured by Seryu's Teigu Koro. Her final action was using her Trump Card, releasing a blinding light, allowing an injured Mine to flee as she is devoured to death by Koro.^{[ch. 9]} Her death was avenged when Mine defeats and cuts both Koro and Seryu in half and, with Tatsumi's help, manages to escape Seryu's suicide nuclear bombing.

=== Lubbock ===
Voiced by: Yoshitsugu Matsuoka (Japanese); Tyler Galindo (English)

Lubbock (ラバック, Rabakku) is a green-haired member of Night Raid who early on has a reputation of being a carefree pervert.^{[ch. 2]} Despite his personality, he is in fact a crafty and reliable individual who effectively wields his Teigu in a variety of creative ways. His Teigu, "Infinite Uses: Cross Tail" (千変万化 クローステール, Senpen Banka: Kurōsutēru), is a reel of strings that can be manipulated into forming weaponry or armor.^{[ch. 5]} He also has a unique serrated string that he can mix in with his normal strings, creating deadly traps for his opponents. Due to his unremarkable presence in Night Raid operations, he is able to roam freely in the Capital with his cover identity as the owner of a book-lending shop.^{[ch. 11]} He was the son of a wealthy merchant and falls in love with Najenda at first sight and decides to join the Imperial army to be near her. Several years later, when Najenda defects from the Army to start Night Raid, Lubbock loyally follows her.^{[ch. 25]} He is cornered along with Tatsumi by the prime minister's son Syura, but succeeds in killing him before he is stabbed by Syura's minions. Tatsumi greatly mourns his death, as they had become close friends during their time together in Night Raid.

=== Bulat ===
Voiced by: Katsuyuki Konishi (Japanese); David Wald (English)

Burat (ブラート, Burāto) has dark hair styled in a Pompadour, and wields the Teigu "Demon Armor: Incursio" (悪鬼纏身 インクルシオ, Akki Tenshin: Inkurushio).^{[ch. 2,5]} As a high-ranking Imperial officer who gains infamy as "One-Hundred Killer Burat"^{[ch. 13]}, he becomes disgusted with the government caring more about bribes than merit, and defects from the Empire when his superior, Liver, is framed for a crime after refusing to aid Prime Minister Honest.^{[ch. 12]} He joins the Revolutionary Army, and eventually Night Raid. Burat is also revealed to be gay early in the series. Although Tatsumi resists Burat's flirtatious attitude,^{[ch. 2]} Tatsumi views him as a big brother, and in turn he views Tatsumi as someone who could take Incursio to another level.^{[vol. 3]} In a battle against the Three Beasts, he is fatally poisoned by Liver and gifts Incursio to Tatsumi in his final moments.^{[ch. 14]}

=== Najenda ===
Voiced by: Risa Mizuno (Japanese); Shelley Calene-Black (English)

Najenda (ナジェンダ) is the leader of Night Raid. She has gray hair, a cyborg arm and wears an eyepatch. She is a former general of the Imperial Army who, disgusted with Esdeath's excessive cruelty, confronts her over it.^{[ch. 16]} After the failed confrontation, Najenda defects and joins the Revolutionary Army.^{[ch. 16]} She initially wields the Teigu "Roman Artillery: Pumpkin", until she loses an arm and eye against Esdeath.

=== Susanoo ===
Voiced by: Shintarō Asanuma (Japanese); Ty Mahany (English)

"Flash of Lightning" Susanoo (電光石火 スサノオ, Denkō Sekka: Susanoo) is Najenda's biological Teigu who joins Night Raid after they suffer several losses. He has dark-blue hair with two large bison-like horns and wears white robes with a red armor.^{[ch. 21,22]} He is in a dormant state until he meets Najenda who reminds him of his previous user, a general man.^{[ch. 22,23]} Despite his quiet demeanor, Susanoo quickly befriends Tatsumi and Lubbock.^{[ch. 24]} Originally designed to be a bodyguard for VIPs, he is capable of cooking, housekeeping, and construction as well as fighting.^{[ch. 22]}. Like other biological Teigu, as long as his core remains intact, he can continue to regenerate.^{[ch. 22]} His weapon is a Wolf Fang Mace that has blades that can protrude from its end.^{[vol. 5:rough sketches 3]} He has a Trump Card, called "Magatama Manifestation" that sucks his user's life energy into the magatama on his chest in order to gain a tremendous amount of strength, and enabling him to use powerful moves such as "The Mirror of Yata" that can reflect any kind of ranged attack, as well as "Ame no Murakumo" which manifests a giant sword with immense power. However, his user will die after commanding him to use this move three times. This does not always happen, as Najenda uses it three times and continues to live; she states that this is possible because Susanoo chose to take his own life to spare Najenda's. He is killed by Esdeath when she first reveals her time-freeze Trump Card. She promises to remember him as a warrior rather than as a mere Teigu, showing her respect for his fighting prowess.^{[ch. 43]}

=== Chelsea ===
Voiced by: Kaori Nazuka (Japanese); Emily Neves (English)

Chelsea (チェルシー, Cherushī) is a ginger-haired assassin who is dressed like a Japanese schoolgirl, wearing a shirt with white sleeves and plaid collar, a black vest, plaid skirt, and tall boots. She also wears headphones with a black butterfly hairpiece. She is almost always seen sucking on a lollipop.^{[vol. 5:rough sketches 4]}The sole surviving operative of a Night Raid regional team, she joins Najenda to fight the Jaegers. While she is somewhat aloof and carefree when not on the job, she is also extremely objective and is often quite blunt when voicing her opinions, which upsets Mine.^{[ch. 22,23]} Despite her nature, she becomes attracted to Tatsumi, admiring his resolve.^{[ch. 28]} Her Teigu, "Phantasmagoria: Gaia Foundation" (変幻自在 ガイアファンデーション, Hengen Jizai: Gaia Fandēshon), is a cosmetics box that allows her to instantly change her physical appearance into anything she wishes, including non-human creatures such as animals.^{[ch. 22,23]} This allows her to get within arms reach of her targets where she uses acupuncture needles to stab them in vital locations. After ambushing and killing Bols, she tries to assassinate Kurome, but fails as Kurome survives the puncture inflicted by her needle. She is then killed by Kurome's corpse puppets. Her severed head is placed on a stake in the town square to hurt Night Raid's morale and the rest of her body devoured by Koro.^{[ch. 33]} Her actions have a lasting effect, as Kurome's wounds never fully heal and are part of the reason why she eventually abandons the empire. Tatsumi is deeply saddened by her death and uses it as inspiration to push forward.

== The Empire ==
=== Prime Minister Honest ===
Voiced by: Kōji Ishii (Japanese); Marty Fleck (English)

The main antagonist in the series, the current prime minister of the Empire and the father of Syura, Honest^{[ch. 10,45]} (オネスト, Onesuto Daijin) is a corrupt and tyrannical politician whose sole agenda is to maintain his position of power and comfort as evidenced by his gluttonous appetite.^{[ch. 10]} Presenting himself as a father-figure to the Emperor, Honest secretly poisoned the previous emperor and his wife to manipulate their child to his end while having political rivals and other threats killed off. Honest's selfish outlook is depraved to the point that he mourned Syura's death for a few seconds before callously shrugging off his son's demise and considering birthing a more competent son. When the Revolutionary Army begins their attack on the capital, having killed off a majority of the court when they planned to hand him over to the revolutionists, Honest convinces the Emperor to activate the Ultimate Imperial Arm Shikoutazer. Despite his obese appearance, Honest reveals he had trained his body to live a long and healthy life of hedonism. Honest also reveals the crown on his head to be an Imperial Arm known as the Erase Stone (イレイストーン, Ireistōn) which can break another user's Imperial Arm before rendered inactive for a week. During the final battle, Leone fights Honest, but he managed to fend her off and fatally shoots Leone in the abdominal area before dropping her from the castle's balcony to her supposed death. After the Emperor's defeat and the failure of his plans, Honest attempted to flee the building, only to be caught in a secret passage by Leone, who had managed to revive herself by fusing with her Teigu. Honest attempted to shoot Leone, but was horrified when she caught all of the bullets with ease before proceeding to pierce through Honest's stomach, exposing his intestines and breaks his spine so hard that he cannot move anymore. Leone ignores his plea for mercy and punches his face and shatters his face, so she can finally pay him back for everything he's done. putting an end to his corruption, tyranny and deceitful crimes once and for all.

=== The Emperor ===
Voiced by: Yō Taichi (Japanese); Shannon Emerick (English)

The Emperor (皇帝, Kōtei) is a young boy who wishes to lead his people to a bright future.^{[ch. 4]} But his naive nature and inexperience resulted in him serving as nothing more but as a figurehead under Honest's manipulation, unaware that prime minister murdered both of his parents. As the sole survivor of the Imperial bloodline, the Emperor is the only person capable of operating the Imperial Arm known as "Imperial Guardian: Shikoutazer" (帝都守護 シコウテイザー, Teito Shugo: Shikouteizā; "Primus Imperator" in the anime), which is a giant 500-meter tall suit of armor boasted to be the most powerful of the Teigu and can fire energy beams that can obliterate entire armies with a single volley. But what the Emperor did not know was that Honest had Dorothea alchemically modify Shikoutazer with a trump card only he can activate on command or as a deadman's switch: Purge Mode. In Purge Mode, Shikoutazer's armor breaks off to reveal its monstrous appearance while the emperor's mind is warped with bloodlust. He is defeated by Tatsumi, who brings forth the full power of Incursio to destroy Shikoutazer. In the aftermath of the siege, after asking Najenda to rebuild their nation, the Emperor relents himself to be publicly executed.

=== Zank The Beheader ===
Voiced by: Satoshi Tsuruoka (Japanese); Rob Mungle (English)

Executioner Zank (首斬りザンク, Kubikiri Zanku; anime: Headhunter Zanku)^{[ch. 5]} a blonde-haired serial killer who initially works as an executioner for the Empire. However, as the number of his victims increase, he starts hearing the voices of his victims and is driven mad by them. This results in his defection from his post. He steals a Teigu and gains infamy for decapitating his victims after they plead for their lives.^{[ch. 5]} His Teigu is "Spectator" (五視万能 スペクテッド, Goshi Bannō: Supekuteddo; lit. 'Five sights: Spected'), a headpiece that grants him abilities like insight, farsight, x-ray vision, foresight and the ability to cast illusions. After being slashed in the neck by Akame, he thanks her for freeing him from the voices.^{[ch. 5-6]}

=== General Esdeath ===
Voiced by: Satomi Akesaka (Japanese); Christine Auten, Kalin Coates (young) (English)

Raised under her father's darwinistic philosophy,^{[vol. 4]} Esdeath (エスデス, Esudesu) has gained notoriety as one of the Empire's most powerful generals.^{[ch. 7]} Originally a resident of a northern tribe of Danger Beast hunters,^{[vol. 4:postscript]} Esdeath is the last of her people and twisted her father's ideals before enlisting the military and quickly rose to her current position. Esdeath then selected her Imperial Arm "Demon God Manifestation: Demon's Extract" (魔神顕現 デモンズエキス, Majin Kengen: Demonzu Ekisu), the blood of a Danger Beast that she assimilated into her circulatory system to gain the power to create and manipulate ice^{[ch. 42]}. Esdeath later invented various ways to control her powers that include a Trump Card which allows her to momentarily freeze time.^{[ch. 27]} Esdeath used her abilities to conquer the Northern lands, encasing her enemies in ice, before being summoned back to the capital to deal with Night Raid as leader of the Jaegers after her Three Beasts fell against them.

Although she is strong at fighting and enjoys torture, Esdeath found herself occupied with love and obsessed over Tatsumi after seeing him battle in a fighting tournament.^{[ch. 10]} With Esdeath unaware of his ties to Night Raid, Tatsumi tried talking her into joining the Revolutionary Army.^{[ch. 16,18]} Tatsumi eventually gives up upon learning Esdeath's life story and realizing she is beyond redemption.^{[ch. 27]} Esdeath learns of Tatsumi's ties to the Night Raid and attempts to offer him a pardon in exchange for his total submission to her, but Tatsumi rejects her offer, telling her that he could never be with someone who only wants to spread war and destruction, much to her disappointment. After Tatsumi's escape, Esdeath accepts her love for Tatsumi as one-sided while resolving to fight him to the death during the Revolutionary Army's siege on the Imperial capital. After Tatsumi's death due to battle against the Shikoutazer, Esdeath battles Akame and ends up amputating her own arm when it was exposed to Murasame's poison.^{[ch. 72]} After the Shikotazer's defeat, refusing to surrender even after the Empire fell, Esdeath attempts to use her Imperial Arm's full potential to freeze everything around her before being killed when Akame activates Murasame's Trump Card to defeat her. Esdeath uses the last ounce of strength to freeze herself with Tatsumi's corpse while her final thoughts were of regret over Tatsumi never returning her feelings for him. After that, she destroys her own body alongside Tatsumi's corpse.

=== Aria ===
Voiced by: Kanami Satō (Japanese); Brittney Karbowski (English)

Aria is a citizen of the Empire. She brings Tatsumi to stay with her family for a few nights, but in reality, her family drugs and tortures gullible travelers to their deaths. Night Raid arrived just in time to show Tatsumi Aria's torture chamber and Sayo's corpse. After a dying Iyesau tells Tatsumi that Aria tortured Sayo to death, Aria goes berserk and insane as she rants on how she tortured Sayo for her beautiful hair. This enrages Tatsumi to the point where he sliced Aria in the stomach, killing her instantly.

=== Captain Ogre ===
Voiced by: Tsuyoshi Koyama (Japanese); George Manley (English)

Ogre (オーガ, Ōga) is a guard of the Empire and captain of the imperial police. He was bribed by a toad-like oil merchant named Gamal to pin all of his crimes on someone else, sending them to their deaths. He was killed by Tatsumi to prove himself worthy to Night Raid. He is revealed to be Seryu Ubiqutous' mentor; as his death drove Seryu to murder all of Night Raid.

=== Three Beasts ===
The Three Beasts (三獣士, Sanjūshi) are elite Teigu users serving Esdeath, having assisted her during her campaign to end rebellion in the northern lands while burying a whole rebel village and its occupants in ice. When Esdeath came to the capital to deal with Night Raid, she loaned the Three Beasts to Honest to help him remove the last of his political rivals. But the Three Beasts meet their end when they attempt to kill Tatsumi and Bulat, Esdeath paying her final respects to them while dismissing their deaths as signs of weakness.^{[ch. 10,16]}

==== Daidara ====
Voiced by: Anri Katsu (Japanese); Christopher Ayres (English)

Daidara (ダイダラ) is a muscular man who relies on brute strength and enjoys every opportunity to prove himself in battle. His Teigu is "Double-Bladed Broad Ax: Belvark" (二挺大斧 ベルヴァーク, Nichō Taifu: Beruvuāku), a heavy axe that can be split into two blades, and when thrown, home in on its target.^{[ch. 11,12]} While fighting, he makes references to "gaining xp" and "leveling up," hinting at an unexplained view of his fighting as part of a game. He was the first to be killed, being split in half by Bulat.^{[ch. 12,13]}

==== Nyau ====
Voiced by: Hitomi Nabatame (Japanese); Clint Bickham (English)

A feline-looking young man with an aristocratic background, Nyau (にゃう) has an unstable family life. Under his effeminate and innocent appearance, Nyau is a sadist who rips off the faces of his victims to add to his collection.^{[ch. 11]} He assumed himself to be the most sadistic person in the Empire before meeting Esdeath, becoming her subordinate to learn under her.^{[vol. 3:postscript]} His Teigu is a flute called "Scream" (軍楽夢想 スクリーム, Gungaku Musō: Sukurīmu; lit. 'Military Music Dream: Scream') that can manipulate an opponent's emotions and weaken them while strengthening allies.^{[ch. 12]} Though Nyau uses Scream's Demon Summon Trump Card to significantly boost his physical abilities, he ends up being Tatsumi's first kill with Incursio.^{[ch. 14]}.

==== Liver ====
Voiced by: Jouji Nakata (Japanese); John Gremillion (English)

Liver (リヴァ, Riva) is the grey-haired the leader of the Three Beasts. He was framed as a war criminal by Honest for refusing to accept bribes while working as Bulat's superior officer, transfers his loyalty to Esdeath for releasing him from prison in exchange for his services.^{[ch. 12,14]} At some point during his service, Liver becomes the leader of the Three Beasts,^{[vol. 3:postscript]} Liver wields the Teigu "Black Marlin" (水龍憑依 ブラックマリン, Suiryū Hyōi: Burakku Marin; lit. 'Water Dragon Possession: Black Marlin'), a ring that can control any liquid he has touched.^{[ch. 13]} When his battle with Bulat comes to a stalemate, he resorts to injecting himself with a deadly poison, and uses his secret Blade of Blood technique to have his blood pierce Bulat.^{[ch. 14]} The poison in the blood kills them both, making Tatsumi the only survivor of the battle.

=== Jaegers ===
The members of the Jaegers. Their leader, Esdeath, is on the right.

The Jaegers (イェーガーズ, Yēgāzu; German for "Hunters") are a group of Teigu users assembled by the emperor to support General Esdeath in place of the deceased Three Beasts, serving as the Empire's security squad and counter to Night Raid.^{[vol. 4]}

==== Wave ====
Voiced by: Yoshimasa Hosoya (Japanese); David Matranga (English)

Wave (ウェイブ, Weibu) is a young fisherman from a small town who joins the Jaegers after having served in the empire's navy.^{[ch. 15]} He dislikes the current state of the Empire but embraces his role as an enforcer due to a debt owed to an unseen savior from when he was in the navy.^{[ch. 28]} Nevertheless, Wave tries befriending some of his fellow Jaegers, taking a liking to Bols and Kurome. His bond with Kurome as well his anger at atrocities caused by Wild Hunt cause him to act against them when Syura tries to violate Kurome.^{[ch. 46]} Wave later intervenes in Kurome's duel with Akame and professes his love for her, convincing her to defects so he can treat her drug addiction. He receives Akame's blessing as she and the others agree to make it appear the two died in battle with each other. Wave initially possesses the Teigu "Carnage Incarnate: Grand Chariot" (修羅化身 ランシャリオ, Shura Kesshin: Guranshario),^{[vol. 4: postscript]} a suit of armor modeled after Incursio that enhances his physical strength and grants flight.^{[ch. 18]} Takahiro describes him as something of a rival character to Tatsumi because their Teigus are similar.^{[vol. 4:postscript]} During Kurome's battle with Akame, Wave receives Run's Teigu "Thousands Miles Flight: Mastema" (万里飛翔 マスティマ, Banri Hishō: Masutima), and is able to use it and Grand Chariot in perfect synch, becoming the first person capable of using two Teigu at once.^{[ch. 66]} However, this causes side effects that deteriorate his inner organs and killing his liver as a result. Wave eventually comes to Tatsumi's aid against the Emperor, and together, they defeat him.

==== Kurome ====
Voiced by: Ayaka Ohashi (Japanese); Juliet Simmons (English)

Recruited along with her older sister Akame by the Empire, the two are separated into different assassination divisions. Kurome (黒女) eventually gains notoriety as a cruel, inhumane assassin.^{[ch. 3]} Kurome was initially subjected to harsh treatment while forcefully administered experimental dopant drugs that enhance her abilities, developing an addiction as they are disguised as sweets.^{[ch. 15,18]}^{[vol. 4:postscript]}^{[ch. 33]} Upon learning of Akame's defection from the Empire, Kurome decides to be the one to kill her. Her Teigu, "March of the Dead: Yatsufusa" (死者行軍 八房, Shisha Yakōgun: Yatsufusa), is a katana that turns her victims into mute zombies; she can control up to eight creatures, including Danger Beasts, who can also use the skills they acquired when they were alive.^{[ch. 19]} She joins the Jaegers and is the first person Wave meets. Her powers are permanently restricted in a failed assassination attempt by Chelsea, and in a final duel with her sister Akame she is killed by her sister.

==== Seryu Ubiquitous ====
Voiced by: Kana Hanazawa (Japanese); Kira Vincent-Davis (English)

Seryu Ubiquitous (星流・ユビキタス, Seryū Yubikitasu) is a young woman with a long ponytail who was a member of the capital's garrison under her mentor Ogre. While seeing herself as servant of justice, Seryu is in reality an unhinged, murderous psychopath who enjoys brutally killing anybody she views as an enemy of the Empire.^{[ch. 8]} She normally wielded a pair of tonfa guns, but also had a body modified with bionic weapon implants by Dr. Stylish. Seryu also received the Imperial Arm Hecatoncheir (魔獣変化 ヘカトンケイル, Majū Henge: Hekatonkeiru; lit. 'Magical Beast Transformation Hekatonkheires'), nicknamed Koro (コロ), a biological Imperial Arm that appears as a small anthropomorphic dog. Koro can increase his mass to become a ferocious monster with Berserk mode; he is able to regenerate as long as his core is intact.^{[ch. 9]} After Ogre's death, she becomes dead-set on killing all of Night Raid's members to avenge his death. Unaware that she crossed paths with his killer Tatsumi, Seryu confronts Mine and Sheele and kills the latter while losing her arms in the fight.^{[ch. 8,9]}. Sometime after, Seryu receives prosthetic arms that are compatible with the assortment of weapons called Judgment of the Ten Kings which Stylish developed. Nine of these weapons are stored in Koro's body while the tenth, a self-destruct bomb, is planted in her skull. She joins the Jaegers as a loose cannon due to her ideals. She later mourns Dr. Stylish's death, who was killed by Night Raid after his failed attempt to ambush them at their base, which reignites her vow of killing everyone in Night Raid. She then has her second encounter with Mine, who improved a lot since their first fight and she is able to destroy most of Seryu's weapons and fends off Koro by hitting his core. Despite this, Seryu manages to beat her insanely, leaving Mine mortally wounded and nearly dying. However, Mine manages to gain the upper hand and uses Pumpkin to blast Koro and Seryu in half. As a last resort, Seryu triggers the self-destruct bomb in a final attempt on Mine's life. She comforts a dying Koro and in her final moments laments that she does not want to die until she finishes slaughtering the Empire's enemies before the bomb kills them both.^{[ch. 38]} Tatsumi manages to save Mine in time, having avenged Sheele and ending Seryu's killing rampage once and for all.

==== Dr. Stylish ====
Voiced by: Ken Narita (Japanese); Jay Hickman (English)

Dr. Stylish (Dr.スタイリッシュ, Dokutā Sutairisshu) is a mad scientist,^{[ch. 15]}^{[vol. 5:rough sketches 1]} who enjoys experimenting with people, and is known for recruiting death row convicts as his guinea pigs.^{[ch. 20]} As the healer of the group, he uses the Teigu "Glorious Hands of God: Perfector" (神ノ御手 パーフェクター, Kami no Ote: Pāfekutā)^{[vol. 4:postscript]}, a pair of gloves that increase manual dexterity and speed, allowing him to perform complex surgery.^{[ch. 15]}^{[vol. 4:postscript]} He can also create cybernetic weapons that he gives to Seryu,^{[ch. 15]} as well as enhanced items that he outfits his subordinates with. Most of his subordinates are also biologically augmented, with names like Eyes, Ears, and Nose representing their respective modifications.^{[ch. 19]} He has some special attack methods: the first is delivering an odorless poison gas that weakens Night Raid, and the second is transforming himself into a large humanoid Danger Beast by consuming his subordinates for power. He is ultimately defeated and killed by Night Raid's combined efforts after discovering their hideout.^{[ch. 21]} Seryu later mourns his death, which she laments losing someone close to her a second time, after Ogre and what reignites her motives to kill all members of Night Raid.

==== Run ====
Voiced by: Junji Majima (Japanese); Chris Patton (English)

Run (ラン, Ran) is Esdeath's personal adviser and the Jaegers' butler.^{[vol. 4:postscript]} He is seen by Wave as the most "normal" member from the group due to his gentle personality.^{[ch. 15,vol4:postscript]} He is a former teacher of a peaceful village, whose students were murdered by bandits. When the Empire decided to turn their backs on this incident to maintain the facade of a "peaceful village", Run was given a choice of joining either the Revolutionary Army or the Empire; he chose the latter in order to try to change the country from within.^{[ch. 47]} His Teigu, "Thousand Mile Flight: Mastema" (万里飛翔 マスティマ, Banri Hishō: Masutima), is a pair of plates on his back that allow him to grow wings and attack using feathers as projectiles;^{[ch. 17]} its Trump Card is the ability to reflect any attack using the wings as barriers. After the final battle, Run becomes the new Minister of Home Affairs.

==== Bols ====
Voiced by: Eiji Takemoto (Japanese); John Swasey (English)

Bols (ボルス, Borusu) is one of the older members (at 32 years old)^{[vol. 4:postscript]} of the Jaegers; he typically wears a gas mask and leather straps styled as if he were involved in torture play. He came from the empire's incineration squad.^{[ch. 15]} Despite his cruel job and fearsome appearance, Bols has a gentle personality and is a family man.^{[ch. 17]}^{[vol. 4:postscript]} Because of this, Esdeath comes to him for romantic advice regarding Tatsumi.^{[ch. 24]} He also does housework such as cooking.^{[ch. 15]}^{[vol. 4:postscript]} His Teigu, "Invitation to Purgatory: Rubicante" (煉獄招致 ルビカンテ, Rengoku Shōchi: Rubikante), is a flamethrower whose flames cannot be easily extinguished.^{[ch. 17]} After his Teigu is bitten off by Leone, he is forced to use his Teigu's self-destruct mechanism in order to escape, but is later assassinated by Chelsea in disguise.^{[ch. 32]}

=== Kurome's Puppets ===
==== Natala ====
Formerly being Kurome's childhood friends, Ranked No.9. Natala is desired to protect Kurome with his Shingu, Trisula. Trisula is a weapon that can extend its shaft to attack far-away targets. He was later crushed by a giant danger beast.

==== Doya ====
An assassin from the Northern Tribes. She is an confident and cheerful sharpshooter who uses double pistols as her weapons. She was latter crushed by a giant danger beast.

==== Wall ====
A famous guardsman who uses riot shield as a weapon. He is a serious person who is dedicated in doing his job. His shield can fire a hidden lance in the wrist mount. He was latter killed by explosion cause by Bols' Teigu.

==== Apeman ====
A danger beast puppet which fights with its own brute force. Tatsumi managed to destroy it after having a brutal fight with it.

==== Henter ====
A survivor of the Ban tribe who is good at fighting with knives. Chelsea tricked him by proclaiming heself as another survivor of his tribe in order to give him surprise attack. After that, Tatsumi finished him.

==== Rokugou ====
A former general serving the Empire before his attempt at defection resulted for him being killed. He has powerful strength that he can easily break a rock with his whip. He fights with technique called 'Earth Shaker', which is used by striking the ground with his whip. He was killed again by Najenda by making him hit by Death Tagool's beam attack.

==== Death Tagool ====
A danger beast puppet classified as Super-Class because of its energy blast atack. It was latter destroyed by Susanoo.

==== Kaiser Frog ====
A danger beast puppet attacks with long tongue. It has strong stomach acid that can dissolve anything it swallow. It managed to swallow Mine but Mine destroyed it by shooting Kaiser Frog from inside.

=== Bolic ===
Voiced by: Masami Iwasaki (Japanese); Mark Mendelsohn (English)

Bolic (ボリック, Borikku) is a high-ranking member of the Path of Peace (安寧道, An'neidō), a religion that opposes the Empire. However, he is actually an agent working on behalf of the Prime Minister. Bolic is dispatched to kill the current high priest so that he will become the next leader and control it for the Empire's sake. Bolic uses his position and drugs to discreetly control the Path's members, turning them into his playthings. Esdeath, the Jaegers and the Four Rakshasa Demons were ordered to protect him, which resulted in intense battles when Night Raid came to kill him. These battle results in the deaths of Seryu and Susanoo. He is easily killed and hanged by Akame & Lubbock while Esdeath is occupied by Leone, Susanoo, Najenda and Tatsumi.

=== Holimaca ===
Voiced by: Kouhei Sugesawa (Japanese); Kyle C. Jones (English)

Holimaca (ホリマカ, Horimaka) is Bolic's bodyguard who wields a lost Teigu that had been recovered. The Teigu is "The Mysterious: Adayusu" (奇奇怪怪 アダユス, Kikikaikai: Adayusu), a scythe with unknown capabilities; even he himself does not fully know its capabilities. Akame was able to kill him so quickly that she never realized his weapon was a Teigu.

=== Four Rakshasa Demons of the Imperial Fist Temple ===
Four Rakshasa Demons of the Imperial Fist Temple (皇拳寺羅刹四鬼, Kōkenji Rasetsu Yonki) were four skilled bio-engineered soldiers in Honest's employ. All four were highly trained and able to manipulate their own bodies, with abilities such as extending their limbs, hardening their bodies, and contorting them out of harm's way, as well as possessing great combat abilities. They were strong enough to defeat Teigu users without using Teigu themselves, and have retrieved five of the artifacts for the Empire. The group consisted of Ibara (イバラ, Ibara), Sten (ステン, Suten), Mez (メース, Mēsu) , and Suzuka (スズカ, Suzuka) (Voiced by: Eriko Matsui (Japanese); Carli Mosier (English)). The Four Rakshasa were sent to guard Bolic but failed their mission.

==== Ibara ====
(Voiced by: Satoshi Hino (Japanese); Andrew Love (English))

Ibara (イバラ, Ibara) is one of the Four Rakshasas. He sticks out his tongue whenever he laughs. During his battle against Akame, He manages to steal her Muramasa but this was Akame's trap. He is than killed by Akame.

==== Sten ====
(Voiced by: Kenji Nomura (Japanese); Wendel Calvert (English))

Sten (ステン, Suten) is one of the Four Rakshasas. He thinks that killing people is relieving their souls. During his battle against Lubbock, Lubbock stabbs him with his strings. Lubbock then controls the string to invade his body, destroying his heart, which was his weak point, resulting him killing Sten.

==== Mez ====
(Voiced by: Aina Suzuki (Japanese); Maggie Flecknoe (English))

Mez (メース, Mēsu)is one of the Four Rakshasas. Her main fighting technique is controlling her sweat, which can make Lubbock's strings unable to work by making them wet. However, Lubbock than tied knife to his string and used knife on the string to stab her, resulting him killing another member of the Rakshasas.

==== Suzuka ====
Voiced by: Eriko Matsui (Japanese); Carli Mosier (English)

Suzuka (鈴鹿) is a masochistic woman whose training as one of the Four Rakshasas gave her vast durability and endurance along with bodily manipulation like extending her nails at high speed to pierce her foes. Her achievements speak to her combat skill, having retrieved five Imperial Arms from enemies in the past. She dies during her fight against Tatsumi. By being crushed down the destruction of the building caused by Tatsumi.

=== Great General Budo ===
Voiced by: Hozumi Gôda (Japanese); Josh Morrison (English)

Great General Budo (ブドー大将軍, Budō Daishogun) was a Commander-in-chief of the Empire. He is regarded as stubborn and is known for speaking boldly to the Prime Minister. His faction is strong enough that Esdeath is hesitant to oppose it. He is loyal to the Empire as an ideal and desires to clean up the corruption within the Empire, but only after putting down the rebellion. This implies that he is antagonistic to both Night Raid and the Minister's corrupt ways. His Teigu is "Thunder God's Rage: Adramelech" (雷神忿怒 アドナイメレク, Raijin Funnu: Adoramereku), a pair of piston-installed gauntlets, which allow him to generate electricity and lightning storms and to deliver devastating punches capable of breaching even Incursio's defense.

When Budo battled Tatsumi after Incursio evolved, he notes Incursio's progress and realizes that his opponent may have done the impossible by fusing with his Teigu.^{[ch. 55]} Budo is killed by Mine's blast during their rescue operation to save Tatsumi.^{[ch. 56]}

=== Syura ===
Voiced by: Ryohei Kimura (Japanese); Adam Noble (English)

Syura (シュラ, Shura) is the son of Prime Minister Honest who leads the elite unit that was made to protect the empire. However, he regards the Empire as a toy and wants to use his elite unit to promote unrest in the Empire. While he respects his father and they have an amiable relationship, Syura desires to surpass his father and become emperor. Prior to making himself known, Syura released many of Dr. Stylish's experimental Danger Beasts to kill innocent people before the Jeagers managed to wipe out most of them. He wields the Teigu, "Dimensional Formation: Shambhala" (次元方陣 シャンバラ, Jigen Hōjin: Shanbara), a pendant that allows him to teleport anyone within its trigram circle symbol over large distances.^{[ch. 26]} Syura is killed when he used trump card of Shambhala to finish Lubbock, who used wires from his Teigu to destroy his heart. After his death, his elite unit managed to kill Lubbock, but they have never seen again.

=== Elite Seven ===
The Elite Seven was a special squad of assassins that serves the Empire during the events of the prequel manga Akame ga Kill! Zero. Except for its leader, each member of the squad carried a less powerful version of the Teigu called a Shingu (臣具) which were created by an Emperor 400 years ago in an attempt to produce stronger artifacts than the original Teigu, but with no success. All members of the unit are children raised since childhood in the arts of assassination and Akame was a member of them, ranked no. 7 before defecting to the Revolutionary Army.

==== Gozuki ====
Voiced by: Rintarō Nishi (Japanese); Aaron Echegaray (English)

Originally a member of the Rakshasa Demons, Gozuki (ゴズキ) takes the seven most talented children amongst the many tested, Akame included, and trains them to be human weapons for the purpose of stamping out rebels acting against the Empire. He did not include Kurome amongst the seven as she finished in eighth place, and he did not want sisterly affections to interfere with their combat efficiencies. He refers them as his "children" and they in turn referred him as "father". He is intolerant of failure and threatens to disown any of them who failed in their missions. As the leader of the Elite Seven, Gozuki was originally owner of the Imperial Arm Murasame before the weapon ended up in Akame's possession.

==== Najasho ====
Ranked no.1 of the Elite Seven, Najasho is the sub-leader of the team, thus he usually treats his companions as less capable than him and had a tendency to boss them around. His Shingu is the "Water-Dragon Sword", a broadsword with the power to enhance the capabilities of its wielders for three minutes, at the cost of leaving them exhausted for a while once its effect wears off.

==== Guy ====
Ranked no.2, Guy has a rather perverted attitude, usually visiting brothels and flirting with the female members of the team. Despite that, he has real feelings for Cornelia and swears revenge upon those who killed her. His Shingu is the "Rare Suit", a suit of armor that takes advantage of the ground to perform surprise attacks.

==== Cornelia ====
Ranked no.3, Cornelia is the big-sister figure of the group. She is killed by one of Chelsea's former teammates called Taeko, after revealing her secret to her, unaware of her true identity. Her Shingu was the "Pulverization Ring", that bestows superhuman strength to its user, but can harm them if not used properly.

==== Pony ====
Ranked no.4, Pony is cheerful, straightforward, and rather dimwitted, who has a deep admiration for Gozuki and loved to please him. She also seems to enjoy fighting and killing her targets. Her Shingu is the "Yocto-bottoms", that gives the user extra acceleration and leg strength, but the user must compensate possible side-effects from extensive use with special physical training.

==== Green ====
Ranked no.5, Green is a bespectacled, rather reserved boy who actually had some feelings for Akame, which are never reciprocated. His Shingu is the "Sidewinder", a whip that moves according to its user's will, but demands much concentration.

==== Tsukushi ====
Ranked no.6, Tsukushi is around Akame's age and the member of the team she seems to be the closest to. Her Shingu is the "Prometheus", a pair of pistols whose bullets have their trajectories controlled by the user according to their will. However, this control gets harder with each round fired after successive shots.

== Others ==
=== Ieyasu ===
Voiced by: Koji Takahashi (Japanese); Patrick Poole (English)

Ieyasu (イエヤス) is a childhood friend of Sayo and Tatsumi. They leave their village in hopes of finding money, but after they got separated by bandits, Aria invited them to stay in her house, but they were drugged and Iyesau helplessly watched Sayo get tortured to death. At the same time, he gets infected and dying from the Lubora Virus and is found by Tatsumi and Night Raid who tells his friend of Sayo's death. He smiles when he sees Tatsumi kill Aria; and in his dying moments tells Tatsumi of how Sayo resisted until the very end and wants to go out like a hero as he dies in his arms.

=== Sayo ===
Voiced by: Mikako Komatsu (Japanese); Margaret McDonald (English)

Sayo (サヨ) is a childhood friend of Iyesau and Tatsumi. They leave their village in hopes of finding money, but after they got separated by bandits, Aria invited them to stay in her house, but they were drugged and Aria brutally tortures Sayo to death, But she kept her strong will until the very end. Her corpse was found by Tatsumi and Night Raid. Once Aria goes on a cold-blooded berserk rant over how she murdered Sayo over her beautiful hair, Her death was avenged by an enraged Tatsumi as he kills Aria by slicing her in the stomach.

== Hinowa ga Crush! characters ==
=== Soukai nation ===
==== Hinata ====
Hinata is the main character of Hinowa ga Crush. She is a girl from the Soukai nation who takes the name of her late mother, Hinowa.

=== Tenrou nation ===
==== King Zuou ====
King Zuou is the main antagonist of Hinowa ga Crush, and is the expansionist ruler of the Tenrou nation who plans on uniting all of Wakoku under his rule.

== Reception ==
The characters of Akame ga Kill! have been well received by anime and manga & movies publications. UK Anime Network praised the development of Tatsumi from a "happy go lucky" protagonist and changes as he interacts with the members from Night Raid. Matt Packard of Anime News Network criticized most of its first villains for being "one-note savages resigned to "grinning insanely while being killed." However, the introduction of the Jaegers led to a more positive response due to the characterization of the new antagonists with Wave's dynamic with Tatsumi being called out twice due to their several similarities in terms of personalities.

== Works cited ==
Akame ga Kill manga volumes written by Takahiro and illustrated by Tashiro, Tetsuya. Original Japanese version published by Square Enix. English version by Yen Press.

1. Vol. 1 (ch. 1–4): August 21, 2010. ISBN 978-4-7575-2980-9. (in Japanese). January 2015. ISBN 978-0-316-25946-0 (in English)
2. Vol. 2 (ch. 5–9): January 22, 2011. ISBN 978-4-7575-3129-1. (in Japanese). April 2015. ISBN 978-0-316-34002-1 (in English)
3. Vol. 3 (ch. 10–14): May 21, 2011 ISBN 978-4-7575-3238-0. (in Japanese). July 2015. ISBN 978-0-316-34004-5 (in English)
4. Vol. 4 (ch. 15–19): January 21, 2012. ISBN 978-4-7575-3482-7. (in Japanese). October 2015. ISBN 978-0-3163-4005-2 (in English)
5. Vol. 5 (ch. 20–23): April 21, 2012. ISBN 978-4-7575-3570-1. (in Japanese). January 2016. ISBN 978-0-3163-4007-6 (in English)
6. Vol. 6 (ch. 24–28): September 22, 2012. ISBN 978-4-7575-3736-1. (in Japanese).
7. Vol. 7 (ch. 29–33): February 22, 2013. ISBN 978-4-7575-3881-8. (in Japanese).
8. Vol. 8 (ch. 34–38): July 22, 2013. ISBN 978-4-7575-4011-8. (in Japanese).
9. Vol. 9 (ch. 39–43): January 22, 2014. ISBN 978-4-7575-4206-8. (in Japanese).
10. Vol. 10 (ch. 44–48): June 21, 2014. ISBN 978-4-7575-4206-8. (in Japanese).
