= Akame ga Kill! =

Japanese manga series by Takahiro and Tetsuya Tashiro

- First tankōbon volume cover featuring Akame

アカメが斬る! (Akame ga Kiru!)
- Genre: Action, dark fantasy
- Manga
- Written by: Takahiro
- Illustrated by: Tetsuya Tashiro
- Published by: Square Enix
- English publisher: NA: Yen Press
- Imprint: GC Joker
- Magazine: Monthly Gangan Joker
- Original run: March 20, 2010 – December 22, 2016
- Volumes: 15
- Manga

Akame ga Kill! Zero
- Written by: Takahiro
- Illustrated by: Kei Toru
- Published by: Square Enix
- English publisher: NA: Yen Press
- Magazine: Monthly Big Gangan
- Original run: October 25, 2013 – January 25, 2019
- Volumes: 10
- Anime television series
- Directed by: Tomoki Kobayashi
- Produced by: Square Enix
- Written by: Makoto Uezu
- Music by: Taku Iwasaki
- Studio: White Fox; C-Station (AkaKill! Theater)
- Licensed by: AUS: Hanabee; NA: Sentai Filmworks; UK: Animatsu Entertainment (former); Anime Limited (current); SA/SEA: Medialink
- Original network: Tokyo MX, MBS, BS11, AT-X
- English network: NA: Anime Network; US: Adult Swim (Toonami)
- Original run: July 7, 2014 – December 15, 2014
- Episodes: 24
- Manga

Hinowa ga Crush!
- Written by: Takahiro
- Illustrated by: Strelka
- Published by: Square Enix
- English publisher: NA: Yen Press
- Magazine: Monthly Big Gangan
- Original run: June 24, 2017 – June 24, 2022
- Volumes: 8
- icon

Akame ga Kill! (Japanese: アカメが斬る!, Hepburn: Akame ga Kiru! (Note: In Japanese, kiru (斬る) is a verb that means "to kill (a human) using a blade". Therefore, the title of the manga can be translated as "Akame Kills (by Slashing)!" This play on words leverages the ambiguity of the katakana rendering of the English word kill (キル, kiru) to create a bilingual pun.)) is a Japanese manga series written by Takahiro and illustrated by Tetsuya Tashiro. It was serialized in Square Enix's Monthly Gangan Joker from March 2010 to December 2016, with its chapters collected in 15 tankōbon volumes. The story focuses on Tatsumi, a young villager who travels to the Capital to raise money for his home only to discover strong corruption in the area. The assassin group known as Night Raid recruits the young man to help them in their fight against the corrupt Empire.

A 24-episode anime television series adaptation, animated by White Fox, was broadcast from July to December 2014. A prequel manga series, titled Akame ga Kill! Zero, illustrated by Kei Toru, was serialized in Square Enix's Monthly Big Gangan from October 2013 to January 2019, with its chapters collected in ten tankōbon volumes. A spin-off manga series, titled Hinowa ga Crush!, illustrated by Strelka, was serialized in Monthly Big Gangan from June 2017 to June 2022, with its chapters collected in eight tankōbon volumes. In North America, the three manga series were licensed by Yen Press. The anime series was licensed by Sentai Filmworks.

By September 2020, the overall manga series had over 4.1 million copies in circulation.

== Plot ==
Tatsumi is a young warrior who travels to the Capital with his childhood friends, Ieyasu and Sayo, seeking funds to aid his impoverished village. After bandits attack their group, Tatsumi is separated from his companions. Upon reaching the Capital, he fails to enlist in the military and is deceived out of his money. A noble family offers him shelter, but he soon discovers their cruel intentions when the assassination group Night Raid intervenes, revealing that his hosts had already tortured and murdered his friends. Joining Night Raid, Tatsumi fights alongside its members: the skilled swordswoman Akame, the beast-like brawler Leone, the sharpshooter Mine, the scissor-wielding Sheele, the string manipulator Lubbock, the armored warrior Bulat, and their leader Najenda, a former imperial general. The group serves the revolutionary army, which seeks to overthrow Prime Minister Honest, who exploits the young emperor's authority while the nation crumbles under corruption and suffering.

Night Raid wields Teigu (帝具; anime: Imperial Arms), legendary weapons forged centuries ago from rare materials and the remains of mythical creatures known as Danger Beasts (危険種, kikenshu). The Teigu's power is immense, with a fatal outcome inevitable when two users clash. Despite their successes, Night Raid suffers losses—Sheele falls to the capital enforcer Seryu, and Bulat perishes against the imperial general Esdeath and her elite squad. Tatsumi inherits Bulat's Teigu, Incursio, while Esdeath replaces her fallen subordinates with the Jaegers, a team of Teigu-wielding warriors that includes Akame's sister, Kurome. As the revolution intensifies, Honest forms the brutal Wild Hunt, led by his son Syura, whose atrocities provoke both Night Raid and the Jaegers. After Syura's death at Lubbock's hands, Esdeath forces Honest to disband Wild Hunt. Tatsumi, captured and sentenced to execution, is rescued by Night Raid, though Lubbock dies in the attempt. During the escape, Tatsumi's Teigu undergoes a dangerous transformation, awakening the dormant Danger Beast within Incursio. A doctor warns that further use will eventually consume him.

With the revolution reaching its climax, Night Raid eliminates Honest's remaining allies while Akame confronts the empire's strongest generals. Wave intervenes in Akame and Kurome's duel, destroying Kurome's Teigu and allowing them to escape together. Meanwhile, Esdeath mobilizes the imperial forces against the revolutionaries. Desperate, Honest manipulates the emperor into wielding his family's Teigu, which he rigs to go berserk. Tatsumi, in his final transformation, defeats the emperor's weapon with Wave's aid but succumbs to Incursio's curse. Begging Akame to kill him before he loses control, she instead severs the Danger Beast's soul, sparing his life. Esdeath, defeated, takes her own life, lamenting her unrequited feelings for Tatsumi.

Leone, mortally wounded, fuses with her Teigu's remnants to capture Honest before dying. The tyrant is later executed, and the emperor accepts responsibility for his inaction. With the war over, Najenda leads the nation's reconstruction. Tatsumi, permanently transformed, retreats to an island with Mine, who bears their child. Kurome and Wave start anew, though both carry scars from their battles. Akame departs to seek a cure for the lingering effects of her cursed blade, reflecting on her comrades and the hope that they may one day reunite.

== Conception ==
In 2007, Takahiro was asked to do a manga for Square Enix magazine. He originally came up with the idea of an "all-female band of assassins, and the protagonist is a boy who is captured by them and has to work for them". After his editor approved the idea, he waited on serialization until his visual novel studio, Minato Soft, had stabilized and released two other titles; during which he developed the characters, story and world. In August 2009, following the release of Majikoi ~ Oh! Samurai Girls, Takahiro looked for an artist for the serialization, and recruited Tetsuya Tashiro to do the illustrations. He liked Tashiro's ability to draw fast-paced action scenes and that he can draw cute girls.^{Vol. 1 postscript} In developing a chapter, Takahiro would write the script first and then have Tashiro determine the panel layout. Takahiro would occasionally get feedback on plot ideas from Tashiro and his editor.^{Vol. 2 postscript}

== Media ==
=== Manga ===
Written by Takahiro and illustrated by Tetsuya Tashiro, Akame ga Kill! was serialized in Square Enix's shōnen manga magazine Gangan Joker from March 20, 2010 to December 22, 2016. Its chapters were collected in fifteen tankōbon volumes, released from August 21, 2010 to February 22, 2017. On August 25, 2017, it was announced that volume 1.5 of the manga, previously included with anime's home video release, would be published as a standalone volume. The manga was licensed by Yen Press in June 2014 and the volumes were released from January 20, 2015, to July 24, 2018.

A prequel titled Akame ga Kill! Zero (アカメが斬る！零, Akame ga Kiru! Rei), written by Takahiro and illustrated by Kei Toru, was serialized in Monthly Big Gangan from October 25, 2013 to January 25, 2019. The story focuses on Akame's past during the days she worked as an assassin for the Empire. Its chapters were collected in ten tankōbon volumes, released from June 21, 2014 to April 25, 2019. It was licensed by Yen Press in September 2015 and the volumes were released from March 22, 2016, to October 29, 2019.

Takahiro released a spin-off manga, titled Hinowa ga Crush! (ヒノワが征く！, Hinowa ga Yuku!), with art by Strelka in Monthly Big Gangan from June 24, 2017 to June 24, 2022. The story and characters are completely unrelated to Akame ga Kill!, with the only shared element being the inclusion of Akame as a side character. Its chapters were collected in eight tankōbon volumes, released from December 25, 2017 to August 25, 2022. Yen Press has licensed the manga and released the chapters simultaneously as they were released in Japan.

=== Anime ===
An anime television series adaptation of the manga was announced in January 2014. The teaser site of the series was opened on January 21, 2014. The series was directed by Tomoki Kobayashi and written by Makoto Uezu. Takahiro also supervised the scenario. Taku Iwasaki composed the series' music. The series was broadcast on Tokyo MX, MBS and BS11 from July 7 to December 15, 2014. The opening theme song for episodes 1–14 is "Skyreach" performed by Sora Amamiya, while the ending theme is "Konna Sekai, Shiritakunakatta." (こんな世界、知りたくなかった。) by Miku Sawai; for the proceeding episodes, the opening theme is "Liar Mask" by Rika Mayama and the ending theme is "Tsuki Akari" by Amamiya. A series of one minute short episodes, titled AkaKill! Theater (アカ斬る! 劇場, AkaKill! Gekijō), animated by C-Station, were also released online in 2014.

The anime was licensed by Sentai Filmworks in 2014. Akame ga Kill! was broadcast in the United States on Adult Swim's Toonami programming block from August 9, 2015, to February 21, 2016. The series' premiere was one of the most watched programs in the block's history, with over 1.8 million viewers. The series was also streamed on Crunchyroll. Medialink licensed the series in Asia-Pacific, streaming it on their Ani-One Asia YouTube channel.

== Reception ==
The seventh volume sold 24,181 copies within the first week of release. The eighth volume likewise sold 37,833 copies in its debut week. Up until volume 11, the series has sold over 2.1 million copies. The English release debuted at nineteenth in Monthly BookScan during February 2015.

All seven volumes of the English translation have appeared on The New York Times Manga Best Sellers list:

- Volume one stayed on the list for twelve nonconsecutive weeks; for three of those weeks it ranked first.
- Volume two stayed on the list for four weeks; for one of those weeks it ranked first.
- Volume three stayed on the list for four weeks; for one of those weeks it ranked second.
- Volume four stayed on the list for two weeks; for one of those weeks it ranked second.
- Volume five stayed on the list for two weeks; for one of those weeks it ranked first.
- Volume six stayed on the list for one week, ranking at first place.
- Volume seven stayed on the list for one week, ranking at fourth place.

The first volume of Akame ga Kill! Zero also appeared on the list for three weeks, ranking at sixth place for one week.

Both the main and prequel manga combined had 3.3 million copies in circulation by August 2016. By September 2020, the overall manga series had over 4.1 million copies in circulation.

Kestrel Swift from The Fandom Post praised the anime's first episode for "harsh, brutal commentary on corruption and how likely it is that the more perfect someone seems, the darker the secret lurking within" as well as the production values from White Fox. While reviewing the series' first eight episodes, Matt Packard from Anime News Network said that "it's stupid and childish" as "[t]here's nothing mature about the idea that evil always takes the form of a psychopath or a power-hungry glutton, or that people become soul-dead assassins because something traumatic happened to them once, or that the physically weak are destined to become slaves and die weeping". In the Goo ranking website, Akame ga Kill! ranked 36th with 9 votes in the list of Anime's Most Miserable Endings.
