= Atsushi Tamaru =

Japanese voice actor (born 1986)

- 田丸 篤志
- Born: February 27, 1986 (age 40); Saitama Prefecture, Japan
- Occupation: Voice actor
- Years active: 2009–present
- Agent: Mausu Promotion
- Notable work: Tamako Market as Mochizō Ōji; The Asterisk War as Ayato Amagiri; The Irregular at Magic High School as Mikihiko Yoshida; Reign of the Seven Spellblades as Oliver Horn
- Height: 172 cm (5 ft 8 in)

Atsushi Tamaru (田丸 篤志, Tamaru Atsushi) is a Japanese voice actor. He currently works at Mausu Promotion.

== Early life ==
Born in Hokkaido, Tamaru was raised in Saitama Prefecture.

During high school, he listened to a program on the radio while studying for university entrance exams, and became interested in the anime song that was playing there. This prompted him to become a voice actor.

During his second year at college, he saw an advertisement in a magazine and attended the voice acting training school.

== Career ==
In 2007, he passed the 2nd Sigma Seven Public Audition with Asuka Ōgame, Asuka Nishi and Mai Fuchigami.

In 2009, he made his TV animation debut in Kupū!! Mamegoma! as Sasaki-san.

In April 2015, Tamaru began broadcasting A & G + "Beloved Memories", a personality with voice actor Yuma Uchida.

In April 2020, he announced that he would transfer to Mausu Promotion.

== Filmography ==
=== Anime series ===
2009

- Kupū!! Mamegoma!, Sasaki-san

2010

- Squid Girl, Papa

2011

- Happy Kappy, Kapibara
- Jewelpet Sunshine, Shiraishi Mikage / Granite

2012

- Code:Breaker, Aoyama
- Jewelpet Kira☆Deco!, Granite
- La storia della Arcana Famiglia, Orso
- Muv-Luv Alternative: Total Eclipse, Creshowa Kontarsky
- Robotics;Notes, Takahashi, Tres Beau 3
- Sket Dance, Uehara

2013

- Meganebu!, Takuma Hachimine
- Samurai Flamenco, Ana Oda
- Jewelpet Happiness, Granite
- Silver Spoon, Kouji Futamata
- Tamako Market, Mochizō Ōji
- Tanken Driland: Sennen no Mahō, Chinpira

2014

- Aikatsu!, Tsubasa Sena
- Haikyū!!, Akira Kunimi
- Invaders of the Rokujyōma!?, Ken'ichi
- Lady Jewelpet, Granite
- Silver Spoon 2, Kouji Futamata, Manabu Yoda
- Sword Art Online II, Talken
- The Irregular at Magic High School, Mikihiko Yoshida
- Yama no Susume Second Season, Ken'ichi's friend

2015

- Chaos Dragon, Hakuei
- Go! Princess Precure, Shuu Imagawa
- Syomin Sample, Kimito Kagurazaka
- The Asterisk War, Ayato Amagiri
- World Break: Aria of Curse for a Holy Swordsman, Eiji
- Jewelpet Magical Change, Granite

2016

- Boku Dake ga Inai Machi, Hiromi Sugita (adult)
- The Asterisk War 2nd Season, Ayato Amagiri
- Hitori no Shita the outcast, Chō Soran
- Touken Ranbu: Hanamaru, Ichigo Hitofuri

2017

- Seiren, Shōichi Kamita
- Tsuki ga Kirei, Takumi Hira

2018

- Gundam Build Divers, Koichi Nanase
- Kakuriyo no Yadomeshi, Byakuya
- Mitsuboshi Colors, Saitou
- Touken Ranbu: Hanamaru 2, Ichigo Hitofuri
- Darling in the Franxx, 9'ε

2019

- Kochoki: Wakaki Nobunaga, Sakuma Morishige

2020

- A3! Season Autumn & Winter, Tsumugi Tsukioka
- The Irregular at Magic High School: Visitor Arc, Mikihiko Yoshida
- Talentless Nana, Tsunekichi Hatadaira

2021

- I-Chu: Halfway Through the Idol, Akio Tobikura
- Remake Our Life!, Takashi Kiryū
- Seirei Gensouki: Spirit Chronicles, Charles Arbor
- The Vampire Dies in No Time, Shot
- Build Divide -#00000 (Code Black)-, Naomitsu Enjō
- The Faraway Paladin, Ethelbald
- Restaurant to Another World 2, Shareef
- 86 -Eighty Six-, Eugene Rantz

2022

- Requiem of the Rose King, Thomas Grey, Marquess of Dorset
- Build Divide -#00000 (Code White)-, Naomitsu Enjō

2023

- Giant Beasts of Ars, Mezami
- Reborn to Master the Blade: From Hero-King to Extraordinary Squire, Rafael Billford
- Sugar Apple Fairy Tale, Valentine
- Reign of the Seven Spellblades, Oliver Horn
- Bikkuri-Men, Alibaba

2024

- Welcome Home, Masaki Fujiyoshi
- Wistoria: Wand and Sword, Jorua Moraine
- Dahlia in Bloom, Wolfred Scalfarotto
- Kinnikuman: Perfect Origin Arc, Specialman
- Haigakura, Gas Mask
- Tadaima Okaeri, Masaki Fujiyoshi

2025

- Promise of Wizard, Arthur
- Wind Breaker Season 2 as Hansuke Tone (tó-ne)
- Necronomico and the Cosmic Horror Show, Seishirō Sano
- The Dark History of the Reincarnated Villainess, Mika
- Tougen Anki, Masumi Yodogawa

2026

- A Gentle Noble's Vacation Recommendation, Secretary
- Go for It, Nakamura!, Ryou Mukai
- Always a Catch!, Renato di Rubini
- Ace of Diamond Act II season 2, Souichi Nagira
- An Observation Log of My Fiancée Who Calls Herself a Villainess, Zeno
- Nippon Sangoku, Yasuke Hei
- The Most Heretical Last Boss Queen: From Villainess to Savior Season 2, Yoan Rinne Dwight
- Wistoria: Wand and Sword Season 2, Jorua Moraine and Rogue Holland
- The Oblivious Saint Can't Contain Her Power, Gilbert Ruby Martinez
- The Insipid Prince's Furtive Grab for The Throne, Eric Lakes Adler

=== Original net animation ===
2023

- Bastard!! Season 2, Sykes von Snowwhite

2025

- Disney Twisted-Wonderland: The Animation, Azul Ashengrotto

2026

- Devils' Crest, Shin Haizaki

=== Anime films ===
- Towa no Quon (2011), Operator 9, Young Man A
- Star Driver: The Movie (2013), Bairotto
- Aikatsu! The Movie (2014), Tsubasa Sena
- Tamako Love Story (2014), Mochizō Ōji
- The Irregular at Magic High School: The Movie – The Girl Who Summons the Stars (2017), Mikihiko Yoshida
- Shirobako: The Movie (2020), Kyūji Takahashi
- The Rose of Versailles (2025), Lasalle
- Ensemble Stars!! -Road to Show!!- (2022), Macky

=== Tokusatsu ===
- Kamen Rider × Kamen Rider Wizard & Fourze: Movie War Ultimatum (2012) – Other Kamen Riders (Voice of Hideki Tasaka and Junji Majima)

=== Live-action films ===
- Meets the World (2025) – voice of an anime character

=== Video games ===
- Yomecolle (2013), Takuma Hachimine
- 12-Sai. Honto no Kimochi (2014), Inaba Mikami
- Gakuen Heaven 2: Double Scramble (2014), Yuki Asahina
- Haikyū!! Tsunage! Itadaki no Keshiki!! (2014), Akira Kunimi
- Nyan Love: Watashi no Koi no Mitsukekata (2014), Kōhei Natsume
- The Irregular at Magic High School Lost Zero (2014), Mikihiko Yoshida
- The Irregular at Magic High School Out of Order (2014), Mikihiko Yoshida
- 100 Sleeping Princes and the Kingdom of Dreams (2015), Caliburn
- Boku to Sekai no Euclid (2015), Nayuta Tachibana
- I-Chu (2015), Akio Tobikura
- Touken Ranbu (2015), Ichigo Hitofuri
- Granblue Fantasy (2015), Viceroy
- \Komepuri/ (2016), Maki Yō
- Gakuen Toshi Asterisk Hōka Kenran (2016), Ayato Amagiri
- Utawarerumono Futari no Hakuoro (2016), Yashimu
- A3! Otome Anime Game (2017), Tsukioka Tsumugi
- Star Revolution (2017), Saotome Seia
- King's Raid (2018), Lucias
- Killer and Strawberry (2018), Tsukimi
- Dragalia Lost (2018), Michael
- Variable Barricade (2019), Kasuga
- DANKIRA!!! - Boys, be DANCING! (2019), Tsubaki Kento
- Promise of Wizard (2019), Arthur
- BLACKSTAR -Theater Starless- (2019), Yoshino
- Ikémen Genjiden Ayakashi Koi e nishi (2019), Tamamo
- Mahoutsukai no Yakusoku (2019), Arthur Granvelle
- Granblue Fantasy (2020), Tor
- Disney: Twisted-Wonderland (2020), Azul Ashengrotto
- The Tale of Food (2020), Taichi Taro Paste
- Food Fantasy (2020), Takowasa, Soka Senbei, King Crab
- Dairoku: Ayakashimori (2020), Semi Tokitaka
- Harukanaru Toki no Naka de 7 (2020), Yuuki Kitarou
- Himehibi Another Princess Days -White or Black- (2020), Arashiro Masamune
- Monark (2021), Subaru Ikariya
- Devil Butler with Black Cat (2021), Berrien Cliane
- Dream Meister and the Recollected Black Fairy (2021), Emilio
- Touken Ranbu Warriors (2022), Ichigo Hitofuri
- AI: The Somnium Files – nirvanA Initiative (2022), Ryuuki Kuruuto
- The Legend of Heroes: Trails Through Daybreak II (2022), Garden-Master
- The Tale of Food (2022), 白湯鍋魚
- Helios Rising Heroes (2023), Bianchi Law
- Fire Emblem Engage (2023), Amber
- Tenshi to Akuma to Koi no Houseki (2023), Jibril Lily
- Ketsugou Danshi -Elements with Emotions- (2023), Kasumi Rikka
- Ride Kamens (2024), Shion Fukami / Kamen Rider Shion
- Mistonia no Kibou -The Lost Delight- (2024), Edward Bernstein
- hanaemu kare to & bloom (2024), Tenya Minami
- Fate/Grand Order (2025), Tōdō Heisuke
- Kioku no Kenban (2025), Andou Jirou, Aruto's Father
- Date Kaname wa Nemuranai – From AI: Somnium Files (2025), Ryuuki Kuruuto
- The Legend of Heroes: Trails through Daybreak II (2025), Gardenmaster
- Cookie Run: Tower of Adventures (2026), Buttermilk Cookie
- CODE VEIN II (2026), Lyle McLeish
- CRAZY CHA!N -Elpis no Kusari- (2026), Ricold
- Sullyland Nursery Rhyme (2026), Higana Tera

=== Drama CDs ===
- FORBIDDEN★STAR (2016), Shitara Soma
- BRIDE of PRINCE (2016), Elvino di Calmando
- Otodoke Kareshi (2017), Ashiya Nagi
- Otodoke Kareshi -More Love- (2018), Ashiya Nagi
- Kinki no Documentary: Luciole no Hime (2018), Gauche
- Memento Scarlet (2019), Misao Suou
- Breathless Momentum (2021), Yano Yukiji
- Souteigai no Sweet Marriage (2022), Yuuki Ritsu
- White Liar (2023), Shiraishi Kei
- My Grumpy Cousin is Too Cute: Side Naoki (2023), Haruki Togami
- Hands Off My Sub (2024), Yashiro Haruki
- Mijukuna Boku wa Shihai wo Kou (2024), Takahina Yukiru
- Pink Heart Jam (2024), Ryo Kanae
- My Noons and Midnights Are for You (2024), Sugawara MayoMei
- Momo to Manji (2024), Kizashi
- His Little Amber (2024), Io
- Memento Scarlet -ripe- (2025), Misao Suou
- Futago to Sensei (2025), Kaoru Usami
- I'm in Love (2026), Koshikawa
