= Tamako Love Story =

- Promotional art for the film featuring Tamako Kitashirakawa and Mochizō Ōji.
- Kanji: たまこラブストーリー
- Revised Hepburn: Tamako rabusutōrī
- Directed by: Naoko Yamada
- Screenplay by: Reiko Yoshida
- Based on: Tamako Market by Kyoto Animation
- Produced by: Riri Senami; Shinichi Nakamura
- Starring: Aya Suzaki; Atsushi Tamaru; Takumi Yamazaki; Rina Hidaka; Yuki Kaneko; Juri Nagatsuma
- Cinematography: Rin Yamamoto
- Edited by: Kengo Shigemura
- Music by: Shinichi Nakamura; Suguru Yamaguchi
- Production company: Usagiyama Shopping District (Note: A consortium of Kyoto Animation, Pony Canyon and TBS Holdings)
- Distributed by: Shochiku
- Release date: April 26, 2014 (Japan)
- Running time: 83 minutes
- Country: Japan
- Language: Japanese
- Box office: ¥124 million

Tamako Love Story (Note: Japanese: たまこラブストーリー, romanized: Tamako rabusutōrī) is a 2014 Japanese anime romantic comedy film directed by Naoko Yamada. It is a sequel of the 2013 TV series Tamako Market produced by Kyoto Animation and starring the voices of Aya Suzaki as Tamako Kitashirawa and Atsushi Tamaru as Michizō Ōji alongside with the voices of Takumi Yamazaki. Rina Hidaka, Yuki Kaneko, Juri Nagatsuma and Yuri Yamashita. In this film, Tamako's life is changed forever when her best friend, Mochizō, confesses his love for her.

The film was released in Japan on April 26, 2014, and has been licensed by Sentai Filmworks in North America. Tamako Love Story won the New Face Award at the 18th Japan Media Arts Festival Awards.

== Plot ==
Now high school seniors, Tamako and the Baton Club decide to participate in a marching competition, while Mochizō mulls over his romantic interest in Tamako in addition to preparing to attend college in Tokyo for film-making. Under pressure from Midori, at the riverbank, he tells Tamako of his future plans and confesses his love to her. Tamako is taken aback and runs away; over the next few days, she remains distracted by the event as she struggles over her own feelings and coming up with an answer for Mochizō. When her grandfather is hospitalized, Tamako and Mochizō stay behind, during which he tells her to forget his confession. After the Baton Club's performance, Midori lies to Tamako that Mochizō is transferring schools to Tokyo (in reality, he was simply visiting for entrance exams), which prompts her to follow him to the train station. After stopping him from boarding his train, Tamako confesses to him.

== Cast ==
Character	Japanese	English
Tamako Kitashirakawa	Aya Suzaki	Margaret McDonald
Mochizō Ōji	Atsushi Tamaru Nozomi Masu (young)	Clint Bickham
Dera Mochimazzi	Takumi Yamazaki	Jay Hickman
Anko Kitashirakawa	Rina Hidaka	Brittney Karbowski
Midori Tokiwa	Yuki Kaneko	Juliet Simmons
Kanna Makino	Juri Nagatsuma	Caitlynn French
Shiori Asagiri	Yuri Yamashita	Kira Vincent-Davis (Note: Credited as "Francis Caorrots")
Choi Mochimazzi	Yuri Yamaoka	Allison Sumrall
Mecha Mochimazzi	Hiro Shimono	Greg Ayres

== Production and release ==
Kyoto Animation announced the film sequel to the 2013 anime series Tamako Market on December 18, 2013. Most of the staff has returned to produce the film and featured the same cast as the television series. In contrast to the anime series, which focuses on everyday life comedy, the film focuses more on romance and drama.

Tamako Love Story was in theatres in Japan on April 26, 2014, paired with a short film featuring Dera titled Dera-chan of the Southern Islands, directed by Tatsuya Ishihara. The film's opening theme is "Koi no Uta" (恋の歌) by Mamedai Kitashirakawa (Keiji Fujiwara). The film's ending theme is a different version of "Koi no Uta" sung by Aya Suzaki and the film's main theme song "Principle" (プリンシプル) is also by Suzaki.

Sentai Filmworks has licensed the film in North America. Anime Limited also acquired the film for release in the United Kingdom and Ireland. One of the characters, Shiori Asagiri, is voiced in English by Kira Vincent-Davis, instead of Krystal LaPorte, who was terminated by Sentai in February 2016.

== Reception ==
By May 11, 2014, the film has grossed 124,894,754 yen in Japan.
