= Camera Japan Festival =

Annual festival in the Netherlands

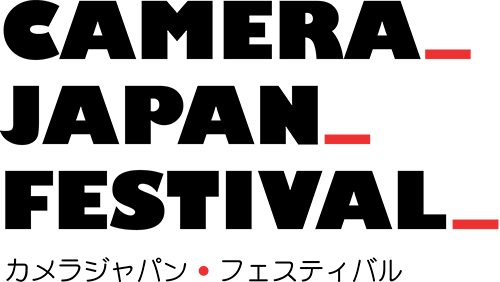
- Location: Rotterdam and Amsterdam, Netherlands
- Founded: 2006
- Founded by: Stichting Tamago
- Festival date: 24–28 September 2025, Rotterdam; 2 October - 5 October 2025, Amsterdam
- Website: http://www.camerajapan.nl

Camera Japan Festival is a multidisciplinary Japanese arts and culture festival held each year in the Netherlands, in Rotterdam and Amsterdam. Part of the movie programme goes 'on tour' the rest of the year at various cinemas across the country.

The mission of Camera Japan is to show the rich diversity of Japanese culture through film and other art forms. Camera Japan wants to be a meeting place between cultures, a festival with room for both high and low culture, for young and old, and for all nationalities.

== History ==
Since its inception in 2006 Camera Japan Festival presents an eclectic overview of contemporary Japanese cinema, ranging from popular anime to (experimental) arthouse and documentaries. Besides film there is ample attention for a wide range of aspects of Japanese culture, with musical performances in various locations, art installations, debates, tastings, workshops and much more.

== Activities ==
The extensive film programme consists of numerous short films, feature films and documentaries, most of which are only shown in the Netherlands during the Camera Japan Festival. Besides recent films, the festival also shows older classic and rare movies as part of a special retrospective. In the past few years the festival presented retrospectives on Japanese film noir, the soft-erotic pink movie and of the work of Kôji Wakamatsu en Shinji Somai.

CAMERA JAPAN Festival also organises a wide range of activities around its movie programme and the yearly main theme. Several concerts of Japanese bands and DJs, lectures, debates and workshops are organised. Fixed components are the interventions, unannounced performances ranging from traditional to experimental music and dance performances, the movie brunch and the CAMERA JAPAN Kid's Day, on which the youngest visitors get acquainted with the richness of Japanese culture and cuisine through traditional games and other activities.

== Audience Award ==
Each year at the end of the festival the feature-length film with the highest audience appreciation is announced.

Year	Film	Director
2024	Let's Go Karaoke!	Nobuhiro Yamashita
2023	A Mother's Touch	Junpei Matsumoto
2022	Tokyo Kurds	HYUGA Fumiari
2021	Ushiku	Ian Thomas Ash
2020	ON-GAKU: Our Sound	Kenji Iwaisawa
2019	Fly Me to the Saitama	Takeuchi Hideki
2018	One Cut of the Dead	Shinichiro Ueda
2017	A Silent Voice	Naoko Yamada
2016	Flying Colors	Nobuhiro Doi
2015	Kakekomi	Masato Harada
2014	Uzumasa Limelight	Ken Ochiai
2013	Tokyo Family	Yōji Yamada
2012	Kamome Diner	Naoko Ogigami
2011	Bunny Drop	Hiroyuki Tanaka
2010	Wig	Renpei Tsukamoto
2009	Osaka Hamlet	Fujirô Mitsuishi
2008	Fine, Totally Fine	Yosuke Fujita
2007	Tekkon Kinkreet	Michael Arias
2006	Hibi: Days of Fire	Banmei Takahashi

== Partners ==
Main location of the festival in Rotterdam is film and music theater LantarenVenster. The festival also works together with cultural institutions such as WORM (Rotterdam) and Museum Boijmans Van Beuningen in Rotterdam.

In Amsterdam, Camera Japan has screened films and organised musical performances in Filmtheater Kriterion, Melkweg and EYE Film Institute Netherlands. Currently, the main location in Amsterdam is LAB111.
