= A Silent Voice (film) =

2016 Japanese animated film by Kyoto Animation

- Theatrical release poster
- Kanji: 聲の形
- Revised Hepburn: Koe no Katachi
- Directed by: Naoko Yamada
- Screenplay by: Reiko Yoshida
- Based on: A Silent Voice by Yoshitoki Ōima
- Produced by: Eharu Ōhashi; Shinichi Nakamura; Mikio Uetsuki; Toshio Iizuka; Kensuke Tateishi
- Starring: Miyu Irino; Saori Hayami; Aoi Yūki; Kenshō Ono; Yūki Kaneko; Yui Ishikawa; Megumi Han; Toshiyuki Toyonaga; Mayu Matsuoka
- Cinematography: Kazuya Takao
- Edited by: Kengo Shigemura
- Music by: Kensuke Ushio
- Production company: Kyoto Animation
- Distributed by: Shochiku
- Release date: September 17, 2016 (Japan)
- Running time: 130 minutes
- Country: Japan
- Languages: Japanese; Japanese Sign Language
- Box office: $30.8 million

A Silent Voice (Japanese: 聲の形, Hepburn: Koe no Katachi; lit. 'Shape of Voice') is a 2016 Japanese animated psychological drama film directed by Naoko Yamada, and written by Reiko Yoshida, based on the manga series A Silent Voice by Yoshitoki Ōima. The film was produced by Kyoto Animation, featuring character designs by Futoshi Nishiya and music by Kensuke Ushio. Plans for an animated film adaptation were announced in November 2014, Kyoto Animation was confirmed to produce the film in November 2015. Miyu Irino and Saori Hayami signed on as voice casting in May 2016 and the theatrical release poster and official trailer were released in July 2016.

The film covers elements of coming-of-age and psychological drama, dealing with themes of bullying, disability, overcoming guilt, forgiveness, mental health, suicide, and friendship of opposite sexes. It follows the story of a former bully turned social outcast, who decides to reconnect with and befriend the deaf girl he had bullied years prior.

The film premiered at Tokyo on August 24, 2016. It was released in Japan on September 17, 2016, and worldwide between February and June 2017. The film was critically acclaimed, with praise going to the direction, animation, voice acting, musical score, and the psychological complexity of the characters. It has grossed $30.8 million worldwide. The film won the Japanese Movie Critics Awards for Best Animated Feature Film. While nominated for the Japan Academy Film Prize for Excellent Animation of the Year, as well the Mainichi Film Award for Best Animation Film, it lost to In This Corner of the World and Your Name, respectively.

== Plot ==
Shōya Ishida and his friends bully Shōko Nishimiya, a transfer student who was born deaf. When the principal learns of the bullying, not wanting to face consequences, Shōya's friends frame him as the sole perpetrator to save face. Shōya blames Shōko when she tries to help him, and having had enough of the abuse, Shōko finally snaps and physically attacks him as revenge. The latter is subsequently transferred to another school, with Shōya keeping her notebook.

With his reputation as a bully following him through middle school, Shōya becomes a depressed loner in high school who thinks suicide is his only absolution. However, he makes amends with those he has wronged before trying to take his own life. Shōya reconciles with Shōko when returning her notebook at the sign language center she attends, realizing she is still lonely due to her shyness. Shōya is also befriended by Tomohiro Nagatsuka, a similarly friendless classmate who feels indebted to Shōya for saving him from a bully.

Shōya tries to meet up with Shōko to help her feed the koi in the river, much to the ire of her younger sister, Yuzuru. When Shōya illegally jumps into the river to retrieve Shōko's notebook, Yuzuru takes a photo of the incident and posts it online to have him suspended from school. Yuzuru runs away from home after an argument with Shōko over the incident. Shōya offers to let Yuzuru stay at his house, and the two begin to bond.

Shōya helps Shōko reconnect with Miyoko Sahara, a kind classmate who genuinely befriended Shōko and is currently in the same school as Naoka Ueno, who also bullied Shōko and weasels back into Shōya's life. Shōko also meets Miki Kawai, her elementary school class president, who now attends the same school as Shōya and is in a relationship with Satoshi Mashiba. Shōko later gives Shōya a gift and verbally confesses her feelings for him, but runs off upset when Shōya mishears her. Shōya invites Shōko to an amusement park with Tomohiro, Miyoko, Miki, and Satoshi. They are joined by Naoka, who is infatuated with Shōya while trying to reconnect him with their old friends.

Naoka also grudges Shōko for Shōya's misfortune before slapping her, which Yuzuru secretly records for Shōya to see. This leads to the group falling out the following day when Miki desperately exposes Shōya's past to the others to remain blameless in Shōko's bullying. Shōya isolates himself from everyone but the Nishimiyas. After Shōko and Yuzuru's grandmother passes away, Shōya takes them to the countryside to cheer them up, where he realizes that Shōko blames herself for everything that has happened to him. Shōya decides to devote his entire social life to the sisters.

During a fireworks festival, Shōko leaves early, ostensibly to finish her homework. Shōya follows her to retrieve Yuzuru's camera, finding Shōko preparing to jump from her balcony. Shōya manages to stop her, only to fall into the river below. He is rescued by his former friends Kazuki Shimada and Keisuke Hirose, but his injuries render him comatose. An enraged Naoka physically assaults Shōko and her mother, blaming them for Shōya's coma, and Shōko experiences an emotional breakdown at Miyako's feet, blaming herself for everything.

One night, Shōko dreams about receiving a farewell visit from Shōya. Shōya awakens from his coma and makes his way to the bridge, where he finds Shōko weeping. He apologizes for bullying her and tells her not to blame herself for how his life has turned out. He also admits his original plan to commit suicide but has decided against it while asking Shōko to help him keep living, to which she agrees.

When Shōya returns to school, he reunites with his friends and realizes how much they still care for him. As they all go to the school festival together, Shōya tears up.

== Characters ==
Shōya Ishida (石田 将也, Ishida Shōya)
Voiced by: Miyu Irino, Mayu Matsuoka (child) (Japanese); Robbie Daymond, Ryan Shanahan (child) (English)
A high school boy who bullied Shōko Nishimiya, a deaf girl, in elementary school. He becomes the victim of bullying when the principal finds out. Now a social outcast, he strives to make amends with Shōko.
Shōko Nishimiya (西宮 硝子, Nishimiya Shōko)
Voiced by: Saori Hayami (Japanese); Lexi Cowden (English)
A prelingually deaf girl who transferred to Shōya's elementary school where she was the victim of constant harassment by Shōya, his friends, and others, forcing her to transfer again. Initially, she was afraid of Shōya upon their high school reunion, due to him bullying her in the past, but after they begin bonding and as he helps her reconnect with her former friends, she briefly develops romantic feelings for him, but is left heartbroken and depressed when her failed confession leads to him mishearing her by accident. Nevertheless, after Shōya saves her from committing suicide, she remains by his side and helps him reunite with his friends once again.
Yuzuru Nishimiya (西宮 結絃, Nishimiya Yuzuru)
Voiced by: Aoi Yūki (Japanese); Kristen Sullivan (English)
Shōko's younger sister who was initially opposed to Shōya being around Shōko. She will then grow closer to Shōya as he tries his best to make amends with Shōko.
Tomohiro Nagatsuka (永束 友宏, Nagatsuka Tomohiro)
Voiced by: Kensho Ono (Japanese); Graham Halstead (English)
A rotund high school boy who becomes best friends with Shōya after the latter saves him from a school bully.
Naoka Ueno (植野 直花, Ueno Naoka)
Voiced by: Yūki Kaneko (Japanese); Kira Buckland, Gia Grace (child) (English)
Shōya's elementary school classmate who joined him in bullying Shōko.
Miyoko Sahara (佐原 みよこ, Sahara Miyoko)
Voiced by: Yui Ishikawa (Japanese); Melissa Hope, Catie Harvey (child) (English)
One of the few classmates in Shōko's elementary school who was friendly to Shōko.
Miki Kawai (川井 みき, Kawai Miki)
Voiced by: Megumi Han (Japanese); Amber Lee Connors, Annabelle Corigliano (child) (English)
A classmate of Shōya's from elementary to high school.
Satoshi Mashiba (真柴 智, Mashiba Satoshi)
Voiced by: Toshiyuki Toyonaga (Japanese); Max Mittelman (English)
Miki's friend and love interest, a high school boy who befriended Shōya.
Kazuki Shimada (島田 一旗, Shimada Kazuki)
Voiced by: Ryo Nishitani, Sachiko Kojima (child) (Japanese); Michael Sinterniklaas, Spencer Rosen (child) (English)
Shōya's elementary school friend and accomplice in bullying Shōko. Kazuki later starts to bully Shōya to save face.
Keisuke Hirose (広瀬 啓祐, Hirose Keisuke)
Voiced by: Takuya Masumoto, Hana Takeda (child) (Japanese); Brian Beckerle (English)
One of Shōya's friends in elementary school who later starts to bully him to save face.
Takeuchi (竹内, Takeuchi)
Voiced by: Fuminori Komatsu (Japanese); Marc Diraison (English)
Shōya's elementary school teacher.
Miyako Ishida (石田 美也子, Ishida Miyako)
Voiced by: Satsuki Yukino (Japanese); Sara Cravens (English)
Shōya's mother who disapproves of Shōya bullying Shōko.
Yaeko Nishimiya (西宮 八重子, Nishimiya Yaeko)
Voiced by: Akiko Hiramatsu (Japanese); Lipica Shah (English)
Shōko and Yuzuru's mother who disapproves of her daughters being around Shōya.
Shoya's Older Sister (将也の姉, Shōya no Ane)
Voiced by: Ayano Hamaguchi (Japanese); Stephanie Sheh (English)
Maria's mother and Pedro's wife. Her name is unknown and her face is never seen.
Maria Ishida (マリア, Ishida Maria)
Voiced by: Erena Kamata (Japanese); AnnaBelle Deaner (English)
Shōya's niece and the daughter of his older sister and Pedro.
Ito Nishimiya (西宮 いと, Nishimiya Ito)
Voiced by: Ikuko Tani (Japanese); Barbara Goodson (English)
Shōko and Yuzuru's grandmother and Yaeko's mother.
Pedro (ペドロ, Pedoro)
Voiced by: Ryunosuke Watanuki (Japanese); Chris Jai Alex (English)
Maria's father, the husband of Shōya's older sister and Shōya's brother-in-law.

== Production ==
The anime adaptation of the manga was announced in the manga's final chapter that released on November 19, 2014, later specifying that the adaptation will be an anime theatrical film on December 17, 2014. In the Weekly Shōnen Magazine's 46th issue of 2015 that released on October 14, 2015, Kyoto Animation and Naoko Yamada were announced to be the animation studio and director of the film adaptation, respectively. The film's distributor, Shochiku, listed the adaptation releasing in Q4 2016. On April 8, 2016, the film adaptation's official website opened, announcing that Reiko Yoshida would write the script for the film, Futoshi Nishiya would design the characters and the film was scheduled for release in Japanese theaters on September 17, 2016. Kensuke Ushio and Pony Canyon composed and produced the music, respectively. The film's theme song, titled Koi wo Shita no wa (恋をしたのは), was performed by Aiko, while "My Generation" by The Who was used during the opening credit.

For the English dub, deaf actress Lexi Cowden was cast as Shōko.

== Analysis ==
=== Themes ===
The cinematic adaptation, based on the manga series A Silent Voice by Yoshitoki Ōima, covers a large part of the original plot. Some segments have been shortened for runtime reasons. Individual scenes were weighted differently so that the manga can be considered supplementary literature, for example, of the characters' backgrounds.

The more obvious themes covered by the film are school bullying and the integration of disabled people in society. The film then tackles handling guilt within a community (although this aspect is explored more in-depth in the manga), redemption for mistakes of the past, forgiveness and self-respect. Director Naoko Yamada explains that bullying should not be considered as the central theme of the film but rather a means to explore Shōya's personality as he gets older. The course of bullying is presented precisely and intuitively, in rapid sequences. It is depicted as a collective failure, starting from school managers and overwhelmed teachers to the class community itself.

The film, lastly, deals with the theme of suicide. Yamada said she was "determined to confront the topic with integrity and treat it gracefully", stressing that it "is by any means not the right decision".

=== Stylistic means ===
The narration of Shōya's story, starting from his past to present, describes how he slips to the lower end of the hierarchy that he established at the beginning. From his perspective, it is shown how bullying can affect an adolescent's psyche and prove his resilience. Shōya faces many challenges: the rejection of Shōko's mother or the avoidance of former classmates, who don't want to confront their past behaviour when he and Shōko work through their past.

Shōya's alienation and inability to look at his peers was symbolised by crosses (✖️) on their faces. This behaviour is often emphasised by camera framing, which avoids the faces of people around him as Shōya shies away from eye contact, often focusing on body language instead. In some face-to-face conversations, Shōya's interlocutor's face is cut out of the frame; the empty space left behind him achieves an unsettling effect for the viewer.

=== Symbolism ===
The film relies on subtle and sensuous motifs. Yamada uses flower language to reflect feelings and personality of the characters. Shōko is juxtaposed with white daisies, symbolising purity, and blue or red cyclamen, which can represent resignation, leave-taking, but also deep affection. Cherry blossoms often enclose Shōko and Shōya: they appear when the two first reconcile and when Shōya befriends Tomohiro Nagatsuka.

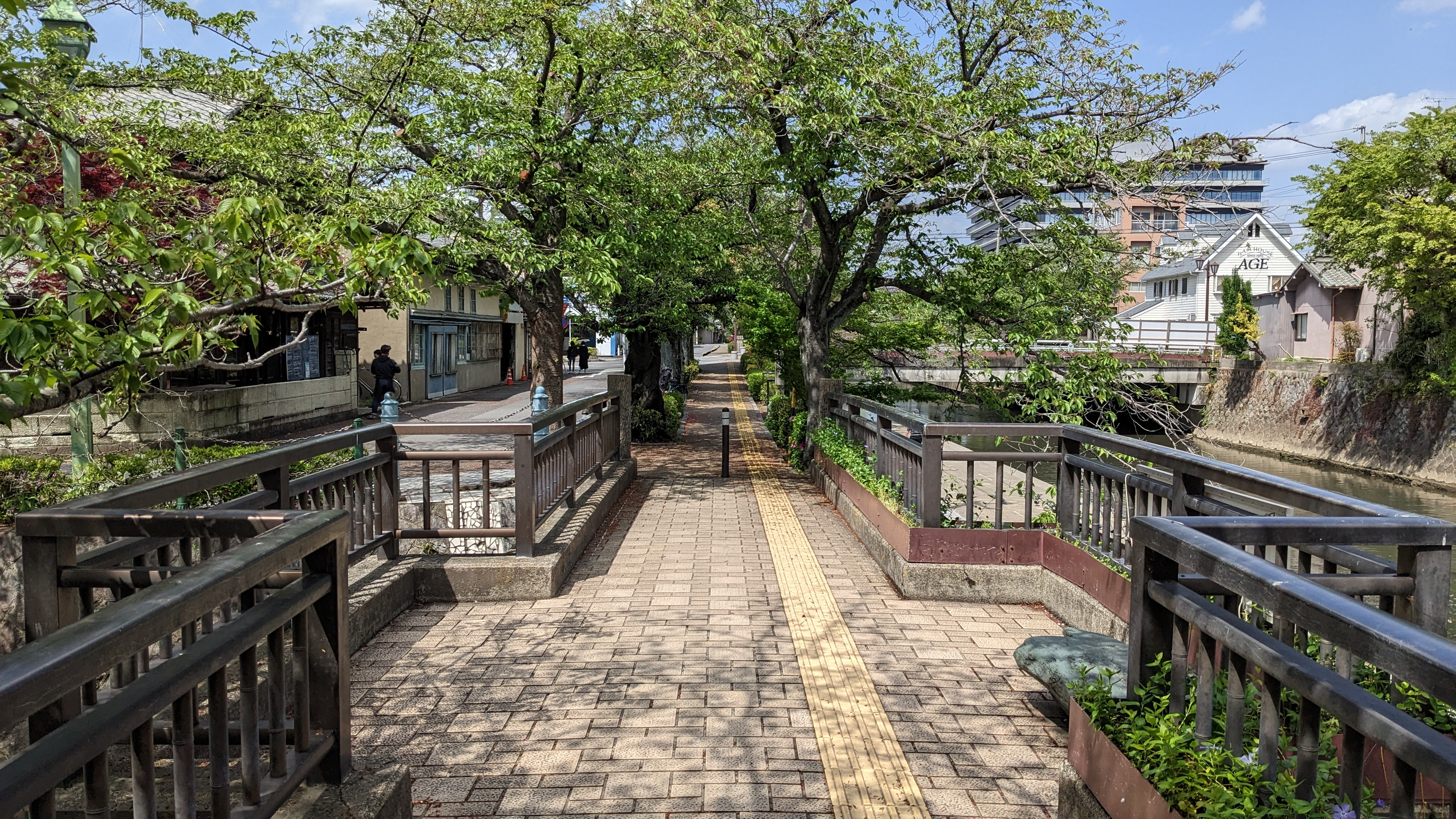
A real-life bridge in Ōgaki, Japan, prominently featured in both source manga and the movie, where protagonists fed the koi.

The koi, a symbol of luck and perseverance in Japan, represent Shōya, Shōko, and the rest of the group overcoming their shortcomings and rebuilding their lives. Fireworks are a metaphor of the transience of each single moment of life: both scenes with the fireworks anticipate the suicide attempts of the two protagonists, reminding them of their hopelessness towards life.

The film occasionally shows short dream sequences. The architecture seen in the background describes the protagonists' inner life, recalling Michelangelo Antonioni's work. In other scenes, the lack of harmony of the characters is depicted by oversized pictures in the room. The characters are stylized, recalling the caricatural style of My Neighbors the Yamadas.

=== Music ===
"My Generation" by the Who is used at the beginning of the film to express teenage rebellion and angst. The song rides the excitement and amusement of the kids gathering before school, ending with Shōko's entrance into the classroom. Yamada said that, for this scene, she wanted to use an evergreen that everyone could identify.

Composer Kensuke Ushio, recognizing the central role of sound in the film, gave importance to musical and non-musical elements, including silence. The song "lvs", played when Shōko is excluded from the class community, was recorded by putting a microphone inside a piano, obtaining a muffled sound in which the piano mechanics' noises are emphasized. This technique recreates for the viewer an effect that resembles Shōko's perception.

== Release ==
The film premiered in 120 theaters across Japan on September 17, 2016. It was screened at the 2016 Scotland Loves Animation festival on October 22, 2016, and at the ICA in London on February 5, 2017. Anime Limited distributed and released the film in the United Kingdom and Ireland on March 15, 2017. Purple Plan released the film in Singapore and Malaysia on March 9, 2017. Madman Entertainment released the film for a limited duration in Australia and New Zealand from April 9, 2017, and April 16, 2017, respectively. Viz Media Europe acquired the film for distribution in Europe (excluding the UK and Ireland), Russia, Turkey, and French-speaking Africa in 2017. In 2017, Konnichiwa Festival released the movie in theaters in Mexico, Brazil, Chile, Colombia, Costa Rica, El Salvador, Guatemala, Honduras, Panama, and Peru for a limited time in May, while in countries like Argentina and Uruguay, Anifest had a theatrical release in June. Pioneer Films released the movie in the Philippines on May 10, 2017. Eleven Arts screened the film at Anime Expo on July 3, 2017, with a limited theatrical release in the U.S. on October 20, 2017, and a second screening in January 2019. On November 14, 2024, it was announced that GKIDS picked up the distribution rights to the film and the film was released in theaters on December 15, 2024.

=== Home video ===
Pony Canyon released the film in Japan on May 17, 2017, on standard edition DVD, standard edition Blu-ray, and a limited edition Blu-ray. The limited edition Blu-ray contains two animated videos of the film's theme song and "Speed of Youth", one of the original soundtracks by composer Kensuke Ushio. In the United Kingdom and Ireland, Anime Limited released the film on standard edition DVD and Blu-ray, and a collector's edition combo set on October 30, 2017. Madman Entertainment released the film on standard edition DVD and Blu-ray, and a limited edition combo set on December 6, 2017. Shout! Factory released the film on a standard edition DVD and Blu-ray combo set in North America on April 2, 2019, and Right Stuf released the film on a limited edition combo set on November 26, 2019.

=== Streaming ===
Madman Entertainment streamed the film on AnimeLab for limited durations between February 14, 2018, to February 20, 2018, and June 1, 2020, to June 30, 2020. Netflix released the film on the website from June 5, 2019, to February 15, 2022. On March 19, 2026, Crunchyroll streamed the movie in its catalog.

=== Television broadcast ===
In Japan, the film received a terrestrial television premiere on August 25, 2018, at 9:00 PM through NHK Educational TV and it received an audience rating of 2.5%, according to the video statistics. It was aired on July 31, 2020, at 9:00 PM through Nippon TV's Friday Night Roadshow amid the COVID-19 pandemic in Japan, along with the 2017 anime film Fireworks.

== Reception ==
=== Box office ===
The film opened at No. 2 at the Japanese box office behind Makoto Shinkai's Your Name, and grossed a total of ¥283 million from 200,000 admissions within two days of its premiere across 120 theaters. As of November 30, 2016, the film has grossed a total of over ¥2.2 billion from 1.7 million admissions. It ranked at No. 16 on Nikkei Hit Ranking for 2016 from East division. It was the 19th highest-grossing film in Japan in 2016 and also the 10th highest-grossing Japanese film of the year in the country (tied with Death Note: Light Up the New World), with ¥2.3 billion ($19.56 million).

In China, the film grossed CN¥44.5 million ($6.7 million). It also grossed $310,407 in the United States and Canada, $110,552 in the United Kingdom, $437,577 in Bolivia, New Zealand, Paraguay, Spain and Thailand, and $5,471,482 in other territories, bringing the film's worldwide total to approximately $33 million.

=== Critical response ===
Makoto Shinkai, director of Your Name, called the film a "fantastic piece of work" and a "polished and grand production" which even he is unable to replicate. It won Best Animation of the Year in the 26th Japan Movie Critics Awards, where director Naoko Yamada also received praise for her work on the film. At the 2017 Annecy International Animated Film Festival, the film was selected as one of the nine feature films in competition.

On review aggregator website Rotten Tomatoes, the film has an approval rating of 95% based on 37 reviews. The website's critical consensus reads, "As beautifully crafted as it is powerfully written, A Silent Voice looks at teen bullying from a soberingly hard-hitting perspective that's uncommon for the animated medium." On Metacritic, the film has a weighted average score of 78 out of 100, based on 10 critics, indicating "generally favorable reviews".

== Accolades ==
Year	Award	Category	Recipient	Result	References
2016	Japanese Movie Critics Awards	Best Animation Feature Film	A Silent Voice	Won	
2017	Japan Academy Film Prize	Excellent Animation of the Year	A Silent Voice	Won	
2017	Japan Academy Film Prize	Best Animation of the Year	A Silent Voice	Nominated	
2017	Mainichi Film Awards	Best Animation Film	A Silent Voice	Nominated	
2017	ComicBook.com Golden Issue Awards	Best Anime Movie	A Silent Voice	Nominated	
2017	Newtype Anime Awards	Best Anime Movie	A Silent Voice	2nd place	
2017	Tokyo Anime Award Festival	Anime of the Year (movie)	A Silent Voice	Won	
2017	Tokyo Anime Award Festival	Best Screenplay/Original Story	Reiko Yoshida	Won	
2017	Japan Media Arts Festival	Animation Division - Excellence Award	A Silent Voice	Won	
2017	Annecy International Animation Film Festival	Feature Film	A Silent Voice	Nominated	
2017	Asia Pacific Screen Awards	Best Animated Feature Film	A Silent Voice	Nominated	
2017	Sitges Film Festival	Feature Film	A Silent Voice	Nominated	
2017	Anim'est International Animation Film Festival	Feature Film	A Silent Voice	Nominated	
2017	Camera Japan Festival	Feature Film	A Silent Voice	Won	
2018	Crunchyroll Anime Awards	Best Film	A Silent Voice	Nominated	
2018	Crunchyroll Anime Awards	Best Animation	A Silent Voice	Nominated	
2018	Monstra Lisbon Animated Film Festival	Feature Film	A Silent Voice	Nominated	

== See also ==
- List of films featuring the deaf and hard of hearing
