= The Strongest Tank's Labyrinth Raids =

Japanese light novel series

- The Strongest Tank's Labyrinth Raids: A Tank with a Rare 9999 Resistance Skill Got Kicked from the Hero's Party
- First light novel volume cover

最強タンクの迷宮攻略 (Saikyō Tank no Meikyū Kōryaku)
- Genre: Fantasy
- Novel series
- Written by: Ryūta Kijima
- Published by: Shōsetsuka ni Narō
- Original run: July 13, 2018 – February 10, 2021
- Light novel
- Written by: Ryūta Kijima
- Illustrated by: Sando
- Published by: Shufunotomo
- Imprint: Hero Bunko
- Original run: April 30, 2019 – present
- Volumes: 9
- Manga
- Written by: Ryūta Kijima
- Illustrated by: Makoto Kisaragi
- Published by: Square Enix
- English publisher: NA: Comikey Square Enix
- Magazine: Manga Up!
- Original run: May 3, 2019 – present
- Volumes: 15
- Anime television series
- Directed by: Mitsutaka Noshitani
- Written by: Hitomi Amamiya
- Music by: Mao Yamamoto
- Studio: Studio Polon
- Licensed by: Crunchyroll: SA/SEA: Medialink
- Original network: ANN (ABC TV, TV Asahi)
- Original run: January 7, 2024 – March 24, 2024
- Episodes: 12

The Strongest Tank's Labyrinth Raids: A Tank with a Rare 9999 Resistance Skill Got Kicked from the Hero's Party (最強タンクの迷宮攻略, Saikyō Tank no Meikyū Kōryaku) is a Japanese light novel series written by Ryūta Kijima and illustrated by Sando. It was initially serialized as a web novel published on the user-generated novel publishing site Shōsetsuka ni Narō from July 2018 to February 2021. It was later acquired by Shufunotomo who began releasing it as a light novel under their Hero Bunko imprint in April 2019. A manga adaptation illustrated by Makoto Kisaragi began serialization on Square Enix's Manga Up! app in May 2019. An anime television series adaptation produced by Studio Polon aired from January to March 2024.

== Plot ==
Rud, a devoted tank, serves as the shield of the Hero's Party and possesses the highest defense stat ever recorded. Unlike his companions, Rud does not raid labyrinths for glory or wealth; his sole motivation is to find a legendary wish-granting treasure rumored to lie within them, which he hopes will cure his younger sister's illness. Despite his reliability, Rud is blamed when a raid ends in failure and is expelled from the party by its arrogant hero, who misunderstands Rud's abilities and deems him useless.

With no place left in the party, Rud sets out to return to his hometown, but his journey takes an unexpected turn when he saves a young girl from a monster attack. The girl possesses the extremely rare Appraisal skill, which reveals the true nature of Rud's abilities, with his defense value of 9999. Armed with this newfound understanding of his strength, Rud begins a new path as an independent adventurer, continuing his quest through labyrinths while protecting others and pursuing the miracle that could save his sister.

== Characters ==
Rud (ルード, Rūdo)
Voiced by: Jun Kasama
Rud is the main character of the series and is known for being the strongest tank as his absorb shield has the highest value in history: 9999. After Rud was kicked out of the hero's party, he returned to his home town Avancia and started exploring Labyrinths to get the labyrinth treasures to cure his little sister Manicia.
When he and his little sister were younger they were both abandoned by their parents and ever since they have been looking after each other. Rud is shown to have a sister complex and is always shown thinking about Manicia. Rud later learned from Luna that his two unknown skills are Life Conversion and Shield of Sacrifice. He eventually learned to control his mana and used it as a substitute whenever his absorb shield was completely shattered.
Nin (ニン)
Voiced by: Kaede Hondo
Nin is the first heroine to be introduced in the series, she is known and revered as the saint. Nin was the only member of the hero's party who was against Rud's expulsion and tried to prevent it. Nin is shown to be extremely proficient in healing and elemental magic. She eventually joined Rud later on after the fall of the hero's party and stayed with him in Avancia. Nin is hinted to have feelings for Rud and flirts with him every now and again.
Luna (ルナ, Runa)
Voiced by: Kana Ichinose
Luna was first introduced encountering Rud after she fled the country she was created in. It is revealed that she is a illegally made homunculus and unlike the others, she is able to express herself like a normal human being. Luna was shown to be able to use magic and has the unique skill Judgement, which she used to identify Rud's unknown skills. Luna has since stayed together with Rud and Manicia in their home, she sometimes is shown making breakfast for them. Luna regularly calls Rud master and is fond of him, it is hinted that she has feelings for him.
Manicia (マニシア, Manishia)
Voiced by: Yui Ogura
Manicia is Rud's little sister and the entire reason for his existence. She along with her brother were both abandoned by their parents as children and have looked after each other since. It is revealed that she had been inflicted with a illness that forced her to stay indoors, Rud had been looking for the Labyrinth Treasures in the hopes that they could cure her. Manicia also has a unique skill of her own that causes the cowlick on the top of her head to move about and allows her to sense when Rud is nearby. So far, Manicia has used two of the Labyrinth Treasures and healed her illness significantly.
Lilia (リリア, Riria)
Voiced by: Ayaka Ōhashi
Lilia and her sister were both introduced at the beginning of the series in the hero's party. Lilia and her sister Lily are twins and are shown to inseparable as they always stick to each other. It is revealed that prior to the series Lilia and Lily ran away from their parents as they were abused by them. Lilia and Lily are shown to have a unique skill that allows them to merge into one being with immense power and strength, but to merge they have to kiss. Lilia and Lily joined Rud in Avancia later on after the fall of the hero's party and are regularly seen with him. She is hinted to have feelings for Rud and is grateful for his help, after he gave advice to both her and Lily.
Lily (リリィ, Rirī)
Voiced by: Kana Yūki
Lily is introduced along with her sister Lilia while they were in the hero's party. Lily has a unique skill "dungeon Walk" which allows her to teleport herself and her party out of a labyrinth, it can also be used to teleport into any floor of a labyrinth. Lily is extremely close with her sister and clings to her every chance she gets. However, she felt inferior to her sister, until Rud gave her advice and she decided to lead the party in one of their dungeon expeditions. Lily like her sister is hinted to have feelings for Rud and was the only girl to kiss Rud, although it was only on the cheek.
Marius (マリウス, Mariusu)
Voiced by: Nobuhiko Okamoto
Marius was first introduced inside the first labyrinth that Rud explored after leaving the hero's party. Marius was defeated by Rud and his party, but to his surprise was spared and befriended by him. Since then, Marius has tagged along with Rud and has helped him with his Labyrinth Raids. He was the first Labyrinth boss to give Rud his Labyrinth treasure and the first demon to befriend Rud.
Amon (アモン)
Voiced by: Misaki Kuno
Amon was introduced in the second Labyrinth that Rud explored along with his party. She is known as an extremely powerful demon king, who even caused Marius to be frightened by her mere presence. After she was defeated by Rud and his party, she like Marius was spared and befriended by Rud. She gave Rud his second labyrinth treasure and was the second demon to befriend him. Amon is fond of Manicia's cooking and would do anything to get more of it.

== Media ==
=== Light novel ===
Written by Ryūta Kijima, The Strongest Tank's Labyrinth Raids was initially serialized as a web novel published on the user-generated novel website Shōsetsuka ni Narō from July 13, 2018, to February 10, 2021. It was later acquired by Shufunotomo who began releasing it as a light novel with illustrations by Sando under their Hero Bunko imprint on April 30, 2019. Nine volumes have been released as of February 2026.

No.	Release date	ISBN
1	April 30, 2019	978-4-07-438133-3
2	October 31, 2019	978-4-07-441000-2
3	June 30, 2020	978-4-07-443915-7
4	August 31, 2021	978-4-07-449243-5
5	February 25, 2023	978-4-07-454830-9
6	December 28, 2023	978-4-07-456697-6
7	March 29, 2024	978-4-07-459477-1
8	September 30, 2024	978-4-07-460820-1
9	February 28, 2026	978-4-07-462433-1

=== Manga ===
A manga adaptation illustrated by Makoto Kisaragi began serialization on Square Enix's Manga Up! on May 3, 2019. Fifteen tankōbon volumes have been released as of August 2026. The manga adaptation is published in North America by Comikey and Square Enix through the global version of Manga Up!

No.	Release date	ISBN
1	October 12, 2019	978-4-7575-6347-6
2	February 12, 2020	978-4-7575-6428-2
3	September 7, 2020	978-4-7575-6827-3
4	March 5, 2021	978-4-7575-7131-0
5	September 7, 2021	978-4-7575-7450-2
6	February 7, 2022	978-4-7575-7726-8
7	September 7, 2022	978-4-7575-8117-3
8	February 7, 2023	978-4-7575-8385-6
9	October 6, 2023	978-4-7575-8835-6
10	December 7, 2023	978-4-7575-8941-4
11	May 7, 2024	978-4-7575-9174-5
12	October 7, 2024	978-4-7575-9456-2
13	April 7, 2025	978-4-7575-9783-9
14	January 7, 2026	978-4-301-00261-1
15	August 6, 2026	978-4-301-00680-0

=== Anime ===
An anime television series adaptation was announced on October 5, 2023. The series is produced by Studio Polon and directed by Mitsutaka Noshitani, with Hitomi Amamiya writing series scripts, Taihei Nagai designing the characters, and Mao Yamamoto composing the music. It aired from January 7 to March 24, 2024, on the Animazing!!! programming block on all ANN affiliates, including ABC and TV Asahi. (Note: ABC and TV Asahi list the series premiere on January 6 at 26:00, which is effectively January 7 at 2:00 a.m. JST.) The opening theme song is "Brave", while the ending theme song is "Yume no Naka de" (夢の中で; "Inside a Dream"), both performed by Ireisu. Crunchyroll has licensed the series. Medialink has licensed the series in South, Southeast Asia and Oceania (except Australia and New Zealand) and streaming it on the Ani-One Asia YouTube channel.

==== Episodes ====
No.	Title	Directed by (Note: Information is taken from the ending credits of each episode.)	Written by	Storyboarded by	Original release date
1	"Kicked From the Party"; Transliteration: "Pātī Ridatsu" (Japanese: パーティー離脱)	Ryousuke Senbo	Hitomi Amamiya	Mitsutaka Noshitani	January 7, 2024
Rud works as a Tank with the hero Kyglas, healer Nin and twin swordswomen Lilia and Lily. Rud's Absorb Shield, the strongest shield in the world, has begun to fail during combat. Kyglas blames this on Rud for possessing two unknown skills, so he callously fires Rud against Nin's objections. Rud decides to return home to Avancia and care for his ill sister Manicia. Rud takes a job guarding a merchant who will pass Avancia but they encounter a child being attacked by a monster. Rud manages to shield the other guards while they kill the monster. The girl, a homunculus created for slave labour, is invited to Avancia by Rud who names her Luna. Luna kills several wolves, confirming Rud's suspicions someone created her illegally for combat. She also possesses the extremely rare skill Identify, which can determine the true nature of anything. With it Rud finally identifies his unknown skills; Life Conversion, which converts damage into strength, and Sacrifice Shield, which absorbs damage dealt to his teammates. This finally explains why his shield fails so quickly as it was actually taking damage from 5 people at once. Rud realises if used correctly he could become the strongest Tank in history, but decides against it in favour of seeing Manicia.
2	"Return to Avancia"; Transliteration: "Abanshia e no Kikan" (Japanese: アバンシアへの帰還)	Masashi Tsukino	Hitomi Amamiya	Yūji Kanzaki	January 14, 2024
Entering Avancia, Rud introduces Luna to his friends Milena the trainee blacksmith and Fille the sub-captain of the village guard. Visiting Manicia Rud finds she is feeling better. She immediately takes a shine to Luna. Luna quickly learns how to cook in only three days, surprising Rud. As Kyglas took his sword when he fired him Rud asks Milena and her father Raisil to forge him a new one. Luna also meets Granny Gigi, the apothecary treating Manicia's illness. Meeting so many kind people causes Luna to tell Rud and Manicia she was created for war by the neighbouring nation Brunkels. Rud admits he already knew and accepted her anyway. Luna decides to live her life as a human. Now he knows what his skills are Rud tests them in a duel against Fille and thanks to Life Conversion he is able to attack as well as tank damage and defeats Fille. Manicia remembers their parents trying to abandon her when she became sick, but Rud abandoned their parents instead and raised her himself despite also being very young. She wonders if maybe she has been holding back Rud's potential all these years.
3	"The Unknown Monster"; Transliteration: "Michi no Mamono" (Japanese: 未知の魔物)	Akira Shimizu	Hitomi Amamiya	Hiroki Maezawa	January 21, 2024
Manicia fears more and more that she held Rud back as it is common knowledge Rud gave up his future as a knight to care for her. With Luna's encouragement she shares her worry with Rud who reassures her she is more important to him than his career. Nin turns up at their home with the news that due to Rud's departure and losing the benefits of his Life Conversion and Sacrifice Shield, Kyglas was exposed as a weak fighter too lazy to even train adequately. As a result they began failing every hero mission they were given and when Kyglas was seriously injured due to his own incompetence the church disbanded his hero party. Without anywhere to go Manicia invites Nin to stay with them. Fille fetches Rud to stop a monster attacking the village orchard. With a better understanding of his skills Rud defeats the monster without anyone sustaining a single injury. Examining the body Rud finds a homunculus crystal and determines the monster was created artificially from a weaker monster by someone for an unknown reason.
4	"Selfish"; Transliteration: "Wagamama" (Japanese: わがまま)	Takanori Yano	Hitomi Amamiya	Koji Yoshikawa, Hikaru Takeuchi	January 28, 2024 (Note: This episode aired at 2:05 a.m. JST, 5 minutes after the original air time on All-Nippon News Network.)
Manicia correctly guesses Rud and Nin like each other, but Rud fears he couldn't be in love and be an effective tank. A normal monster appears so the guards set out to kill it and find the newly appeared labyrinth it came from. Unfortunately three monsters appear, panicking Fille as leader until Rud inspires her. Rud also gets a chance to use his new magic sword. With the monsters dead the labyrinth entrance is discovered just outside the village, bringing prosperity to Avancia's struggling economy. Nin and Rud worry though as labyrinths mean more adventurers, not all of whom are law abiding, especially in a place like Avancia which doesn't have an adventurer guild. The local lord decides either Rud form a clan of his own to uphold law and order in Avancia, or for safety the labyrinth be destroyed. Rud can't decide; if he forms a clan he will need to stay in Avancia and might never find a spell to cure Manicia's illness, but without the labyrinth Avancia will have no future. In the end Manicia convinces him to form a clan but with Luna and Nin as his subordinates so they can protect Avancia while still allowing Rud time to search for a cure.
5	"Towards Dreams"; Transliteration: "Yume e" (Japanese: 夢へ)	Ayaka Tsujihashi	Hitomi Amamiya	Ayaka Tsujihashi	February 4, 2024
Rud is summoned by Lilia and Lily and church knight Sugol who take him to meet Kyglas. Kyglas has matured since their last encounter and appreciates how much Rud was supporting him, and apologizes for unfairly banishing him. Kyglas also has fresh injuries from a guardian of the new labyrinth which possesses intelligence, unlike normal guardians, so he needs Rud to take over defeating it. They enter the labyrinth and fight their way to floor 10, unaware a man is observing them. Reaching him the man is revealed to be the guardian Marius. He pushes everyone to their limit and Rud considers retreating to keep everyone alive but Nin reminds him Manicia's cure could be in this labyrinth. After a brutal fight Marius cheerfully admits defeat but is surprised that Rud didn't kill him, instead asking if Marius possesses the Legendary Labyrinth Treasure that can grant a single wish. Marius admits he does and gives them a magic stone. In exchange Rud lets him live so the labyrinth will support Avancia. Rud returns home with the stone which alleviates Manicia's symptoms but doesn't fully cure her, so he promises to keep searching for more labyrinth treasures. A few days later, Marius appears in the village and cheerfully announces Rud is the new guardian of the labyrinth.
6	"The Labyrinth Manager"; Transliteration: "Meikyū Kanrisha" (Japanese: 迷宮管理者)	Masashi Tsukino	Hitomi Amamiya	Yūji Kanzaki	February 11, 2024
Rud can't control the hundreds of new adventurers and must consider inviting a second guild to form an alliance. Despite Rud's refusing the guardian job Marius shows him how to run the labyrinth; in exchange for points he can spawn monsters or alter the labyrinth, points are recharged over time or when adventurers take damage. Realizing he could use the labyrinth to manipulate Avancia's economy Rud accepts becoming its guardian and experiments by creating a slime he names Lime. Hearing of his need of an alliance Rud is invited to a party in Keild town to meet two large clans, Black Dragon Fang and White Tiger Claw. Both clans have demanded Nin join them as a condition for an alliance but Rud plans to refuse, making Nin very happy. Marius reveals Keild's labyrinth also has an undefeated intelligent guardian. At the party both clans insult or ignore Rud and go after Nin shamelessly. Rud puts his foot down and wagers with the Black Dragon Fang clan leader Gosh and White Tiger Claw guild leader Lutel that he will completely conquer Keild's labyrinth, something neither guild has ever managed, and when he does both clans will form alliances without argument.
7	"In Keild"; Transliteration: "Keirudo Nite" (Japanese: ケイルドにて)	Shigeki Awai	Hitomi Amamiya	Hiroki Maezawa	February 18, 2024 (Note: This episode aired at 2:30 a.m. JST, 30 minutes after the original air time on All-Nippon News Network.)
Lily asks for Rud's advice; she is less confident and clumsier than Lilia and wants to become more capable on her own. Rud offers her any support she needs; exciting her so much she trips them both onto her bed. Lilia returns and pretends to be angry to get Rud alone. She reveals that when they were children their abusive parents left Lily afraid of almost everything, so her aim is to build a life where Lily is always happy. The next day they enter Keild's labyrinth where Lily surprises everyone by asking to act as raid leader. Rud discovers as a labyrinth guardian he now possesses an instinct for how labyrinths are designed and where monsters appear. On floor 49 Rud happens to ask if Marius is a monster or a human, so he reluctantly reveals he is actually a demonoid, a demi-human whose ancestors worshipped demons instead of God. Usually demonoids become labyrinth guardians as labyrinths were created by demons to kill humans. This upsets Nin as the church claims God created labyrinths to provide wealth to humanity. On floor 50 they encounter a Bone Dragon which takes over an hour to defeat. As floor 50 is the deepest either guild has ever been to, they return to the surface to rest before attempting floor 51. Lilia opts not to celebrate and returns to her room with Lily following.
8	"Lilia and Lily"; Transliteration: "Riria to Rirī" (Japanese: リリアとリリィ)	Akira Shimizu	Hitomi Amamiya	Kōki Uchinomiya	February 25, 2024
Nin once again broaches the subject of becoming Rud's lover, but he again refuses due to his commitment to cure Manicia. Luna confesses she might also have a crush on him, but Rud attributes this to Luna being drunk for the first time. Lilia worries everything is changing too fast, especially Lily who did so well leading in the dungeon she might one day leave Lilia behind. Rud worries Lilia might find it difficult to let Lily become independent. They return to floor 51 filled with a blinding fog and learn how to detect monsters by their mana. On floor 52 they encounter a Dark Skeleton that possesses the powers of a tank, magician and swordsman. Luna is put to sleep while Lilia and Lily are hypnotized into a murderous rage from memories of their abusive parents. Rud snaps them out of it and discovers the skeleton's weakness, defeating it soon after. When they cannot locate the path to floor 53 Marius suspects the labyrinth guardian might now be afraid of them and has prevented them moving to the next floor. They decide to return to the surface but the guardian suddenly appears, a young woman who bites Rud, with Marius realising she is a Demon King.
9	"Amon Sloth"; Transliteration: "Amon・Srōsu" (Japanese: アモン・スロース)	Yuki Kusakabe, Yūki Kakuhara	Hitomi Amamiya	Hiroki Maezawa	March 3, 2024
Marius reveals she is the 300 year old Demon King Amon Sloth. Amon mocks Marius for giving up his chance to become a Demon King himself and decides to kill them all. Fighting together they manage to injure Amon, so she transforms into a giant wolf protected by wind magic. After a difficult fight Amon is injured but Rud's shield starts to run out of magic and Marius and Lilia are hurt. Lily replaces Lilia and Rud copies Marius by using his magic to generate a barrier to replace his powerless shield. Amon is severely weakened and returns to her original body to admit defeat and grant Rud another wish-granting crystal. Interrogating her Rud learns she and other demon kings are competing to see which of them will destroy the world first, though it is a game she is bored of playing so she happily accepts Rud's offer to join his party to defeat the other demon kings. Returning to the surface Rud keeps Amon's secret and instead offers a map of floor 52 as proof they conquered the labyrinth, causing both guilds to form an alliance with him. Lily secretly kisses Rud for helping her grow. The second wishing stone makes Manicia feel even better than before. Amon decides to stay in Avancia after trying Manicia's cooking.
10	"Foreign Homunculi"; Transliteration: "Ikoku no Homunkurusu" (Japanese: 異国のホムンクルス)	Masashi Tsukino	Hitomi Amamiya	Yūji Kanzaki	March 9, 2024
Another homunculus named Fair appears in Avancia begging for help rescuing her friends. Rud and Nin find a group of homunculi attacking each other; twelve are Fair's friends while six are mindless combat homunculi sent to kill them for fleeing the Brunkel Kingdom. Despite feeling a huge amount of guilt Rud accepts they are mindless and regretfully kills all six. Rud offers all thirteen homunculi sanctuary but knows keeping them will cause political problems with Brunkels. Avancia's bailiff is disturbed by Fair's claims Brunkel's king made a deal with the Demon King Greed to mass produce homunculi, and agrees they can stay in Avancia while he passes the news to his superiors. Rud arranges for the homunculi to be paid to construct a bath house. Rud worries Luna is spending all her time with the homunculi yet still hasn't told anyone else she is one. Luna plans to change the people's opinions of homunculi before revealing herself. Amon informs Rud that Greed is likely creating homunculi as experiments to create a being of ultimate power, though mostly it is to prevent the boredom associated with immortality. Rud is tempted to go defeat Greed with the new magic ability he copied from Marius but Amon warns him overusing it could turn him into a monster, or even into a Demon King. Rud isn't worried by the risk until he suddenly hallucinates a voice urging him to destroy everything.
11	"Attack of the Monsters"; Transliteration: "Mamono no Shūgeki" (Japanese: 魔物の襲撃)	Hitomi Ezoe	Hitomi Amamiya	Daisuke Kurose	March 16, 2024
The homunculi are slowly accepted into Avancia's society. Rud trains his new abilities in case he has to fight Greed. Rud donates some of his labyrinth points to Nin and Lily to summon monsters as their familiars, a wyvern named Bayvern and a Devil-fairy named Lufair. After weeks of construction the bath house is opened with the homunculi as the employees. Rud can't enjoy his first bath due to having to stop the male adventurers spying on the ladies, yet it is Rud who ends up being punished for it. A horde of monsters appears so the village guards, adventurers and homunculi band together to protect Avancia. Amon informs Rud the monsters came from yet another new labyrinth and were likely sent by Greed, the new labyrinth guardian to destroy Avancia. Rud increases Avancia's defenses by leading monsters from his labyrinth into battle, saving Avancia, but his darkening aura and behaviour starts to worry his friends. Rud decides to conquer the new dungeon immediately, capture Greed and interrogate him about Brunkels Kingdom. Rud asks Marius and Amon to protect Avancia from more attacks while he and the others hunt Greed. Rud also invites the homunculi' strongest warrior Samimina to join them. Entering the labyrinth they discover it contains only a single floor with no monsters except for Greed whom they must fight straight away.
12	"Magic Power"; Transliteration: "Ma no Chikara" (Japanese: 魔の力)	Mitsutaka Noshitani	Hitomi Amamiya	Mitsutaka Noshitani	March 23, 2024
Greed identifies Samimina and Luna as homunculi, revealing Luna's identity to the others. Rud notices Samimina taking risks in battle due to her remaining belief she is expendable, so he forces her to stop fighting. Greed is defeated quickly, only for Rud to realize he is a homunculus, a copy of the real Greed who appears behind them and quickly defeats Lilia and Lily. Injuring Rud severely, the others are left without the protection granted by his shield and Greed quickly takes them out as well. Seeing Luna about to die Rud allows the dark voice in his head to take over, causing him to go berserk. He defeats Greed and starts savagely beating him, even moving to murder Nin when she tries to interfere. Fortunately, she slaps him which drives away the voice and just barely allows him to gain control of himself. Greed takes advantage and gloats his army will destroy Avancia, which he shows them via video projection spells. Unknown to Greed this lets Rud extend his shield abilities to the entire army defending Avancia, temporarily granting him strength of 1,000,000 and hitting Greed with such force that he is blown completely out of the labyrinth, defeating him. Having defeated Greed and his labyrinth the group return to Avancia where the townspeople declare Rud the Strongest Tank in History.

== See also ==
- A Gentle Noble's Vacation Recommendation, another light novel series illustrated by Sando
