= Yūki Kaneko =

Japanese voice actress from Fukuoka (born 1987)

- 金子有希
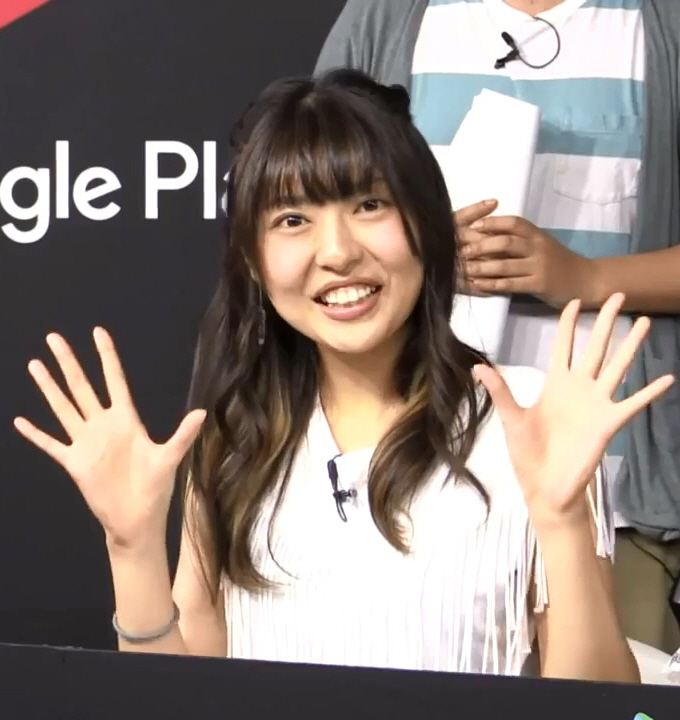
- Kaneko in 2016
- Born: January 19, 1987 (age 39); Fukuoka Prefecture, Japan
- Occupation: Voice actress

Yūki Kaneko (金子有希; born January 19, 1987) is a Japanese voice actress from Fukuoka who is affiliated with Aoni Production.

== Roles ==
=== Anime ===
2013

- Chibi Maruko-chan as Sister in high school
- Tamako Market as Midori Tokiwa
- Fantasista Doll as Tekoreishon <US>
- One Piece as child

2014

- One Piece as Assistant # 638, fairy, mom, child, woman
- Tamako Love Story as Midori Tokiwa

2015

- The Idolmaster Cinderella Girls as Aiko Takamori
- The Idolmaster Cinderella Girls 2nd Season as Aiko Takamori

2016

- A Silent Voice as Naoka Ueno

2018

- Harukana Receive as Kanata's mother

2019

- One Piece as Charlotte Allmeg

2021

- One Piece as Tenjo-Sagari
- Yashahime: Princess Half-Demon as Oharu

=== Games ===
2010

- Tokimeki Memorial Girl's Side 3rd Story

2012

- Ryū ga Gotoku 5: Yume Kanaeshi Mono as Riku

2013

- The Idolmaster Cinderella Girls as Aiko Takamori

2015

- God Eater Resurrection as Annette Koenig

2023

- Xenoblade Chronicles 3: Future Redeemed as Consul R

=== Radio ===
- Gachi Yomi! Deko Yomi!?

=== Web Drama ===
2011

- Hōkago wa Mystery to Tomo ni as Ryō Kirigamine (voice)
