= Welcome Home (manga) =

Japanese manga series

- First tankōbon volume cover

ただいま、おかえり (Tadaima, Okaeri)
- Genre: Yaoi, Omegaverse, slice of life
- Manga
- Written by: Ichi Ichikawa
- Published by: Fusion Product
- English publisher: Manga Club (former); MediBang (current)
- Magazine: Omegaverse Project
- Original run: November 24, 2015 – present
- Volumes: 5
- Anime television series

Tadaima, Okaeri
- Directed by: Shinji Ishihira
- Written by: Yoshiko Nakamura
- Music by: Megumi Oohashi
- Studio: Studio Deen
- Licensed by: Crunchyroll; SEA: Medialink
- Original network: Tokyo MX, BS Nippon, MBS, Animax
- Original run: April 9, 2024 – June 25, 2024
- Episodes: 12
- icon

Welcome Home (ただいま、おかえり, Tadaima, Okaeri; lit. "I'm Home, Welcome Back") is a Japanese boy's love slice of life manga series by Ichi Ichikawa. It has been serialized in Fusion Product's Omegaverse Project anthology magazine since November 2015 and has been collected in five tankōbon volumes. The series was published in English by Manga Club, and is currently published by MediBang. An anime television series adaptation produced by Studio Deen aired from April to June 2024.

== Plot ==
College graduates Hiromu and Masaki Fujiyoshi are a same-sex married couple. They are then blessed with parenthood when Masaki becomes pregnant and gives birth to their firstborn child, a little boy named Hikari, thus creating the loving happy family they've always dreamed of.

However, they live in a society where men and women are judged based on gender status, and are divided in three different classes: the first are Alphas, people who are considered more dominant and are able to impregnate both male and female gendered individuals carrying the Omega type-gene; Omegas, who are males and females that can get pregnant and give birth to children; and Betas, who are regular humans without a secondary gender. Due to this, Hiromu’s family disowned them for a time, and refused to acknowledge their relationship and grandchildren.

For many years, both Alphas and Omegas like Hiromu and Masaki have faced the most discrimination, especially those in relationships or marriages to those of the opposite type, since it is customary for relationships to be between matching types. Two years after suffering animosity and harassment in their previous neighborhood, Masaki and Hiromu move to a new neighborhood and city that is better suited to raising children.

When Hikari turns 2 years old, Masaki and Hiromu later discover that they're expecting their second child, so Hikari will have a younger sibling to grow up with; Masaki then gives birth to a little girl named Hinata. Despite the continuing prejudice that they face, the Fujiyoshi family have many supportive friends, neighbors, and co-workers to give them the support, love, acceptance and compassion they deserve.

== Characters ==
Masaki Fujiyoshi (藤吉 真生, Fujiyoshi Masaki)
Voiced by: Atsushi Tamaru
Hiromu Fujiyoshi (藤吉 弘, Fujiyoshi Hiromu)
Voiced by: Toshiyuki Morikawa
Hikari Fujiyoshi (藤吉 輝, Fujiyoshi Hikari)
Voiced by: Atsumi Tanezaki
Yūki Hirai (平井 祐樹, Hirai Yūki)
Voiced by: Taku Yashiro
Tomohiro Matsuo (松尾 知泰, Matsuo Tomohiro)
Voiced by: Kohsuke Toriumi
Hinata Fujiyoshi (藤吉 陽, Fujiyoshi Hinata)
Voiced by: Konomi Kohara
Aoto Mochizuki (望月 仰人, Mochizuki Aoto)
Voiced by: Shintarō Asanuma
Michiru Mochizuki (望月 満, Mochizuki Michiru)
Voiced by: Kaede Hondo
Yūto Matsuo (松尾 優人, Matsuo Yūto)
Voiced by: Toshiki Masuda
Shūto Matsuo (松尾 秀人, Matsuo Shūto)
Voiced by: Kazuyuki Okitsu
Kazuhiko Ogiwara (荻原 和彦, Ogiwara Kazuhiko)
Voiced by: Junta Terashima

== Media ==
=== Manga ===
No.	Release date	ISBN
1	June 24, 2016	978-4-86589-200-0
2	June 24, 2017	978-4-86589-358-8
3	April 24, 2018	978-4-86589-481-3
4	April 24, 2019	978-4-86589-558-2; 978-4-86589-560-5 (SE)
5	April 24, 2024	978-4-86589-779-1

=== Anime ===
An anime adaptation was announced on September 28, 2023. It was later revealed to be a television series produced by Studio Deen and directed by Shinji Ishihira, with scripts written by Yoshiko Nakamura, Junta Matsumura serving as assistant director, character designs handled by Mina Ōsawa, and music composed by Megumi Oohashi. The series aired from April 9 to June 25, 2024, on Tokyo MX and other networks. (Note: Tokyo MX listed the series premiere at 24:30 on April 8, 2024, which April 9 at 12:30 a.m. JST.) The opening theme song is "Futatsu no Kotoba" (ふたつのことば; "Two Words"), performed by Madkid, while the ending theme song is "Tsunagiai" (つなぎあい; "Connection"), performed by Takayoshi Tanimoto. Crunchyroll streamed the series under the original title Tadaima, Okaeri. Medialink licensed the series and streamed it on Ani-One Asia's YouTube channel. The company also released the series in Southeast Asia, Hong Kong, and Taiwan on November 28, 2024.

==== Episodes ====
No.	Title (Note: All English titles are taken from Crunchyroll.)	Directed by (Note: Information is taken from the ending credits of each episode.)	Written by	Storyboarded by	Original release date
1	"It's Nice to Meet You"; Transliteration: "Hajimemashite" (Japanese: はじめまして)	Naoki Murata	Yoshiko Nakamura	Shinji Ishihara	April 9, 2024
2	"Friend"; Transliteration: "O Tomodachi" (Japanese: おともだち)	Masahiko Watanabe	Yoshiko Nakamura	Shinji Ishihara	April 16, 2024
3	"Sorry"; Transliteration: "Gomennasai" (Japanese: ごめんなさい)	Tsuyoshi Yoshimoto	Yuka Yamada	Toshinori Watanabe	April 23, 2024
4	"Shining Days"; Transliteration: "Kagayaku Hi" (Japanese: かがやくひ)	Masahiko Watanabe	Sayuri Ohba	Hideaki Ohba	April 30, 2024
5	"Big Brother"; Transliteration: "Onii-chan" (Japanese: おにいちゃん)	Kanae Komoda	Yuka Yamada	Kanae Komoda	May 7, 2024
6	"Home Visit"; Transliteration: "Satogaeri" (Japanese: さとがえり)	Naoki Murata	Yoshiko Nakamura	Shinji Ishihara	May 14, 2024
7	"I'm Home, Welcome Home"; Transliteration: "Tadaima, Okaeri" (Japanese: ただいま、おかえり)	Tsuyoshi Yoshimoto	Sayuri Ohba	Hitomi Ezoe	May 21, 2024
8	"Interweaving"; Transliteration: "Ayatsunagi" (Japanese: あやつなぎ)	Masahiko Watanabe	Yuka Yamada	Yūta Suzuki	May 28, 2024
9	"Tomato Kid"; Transliteration: "Tomato no Ko" (Japanese: とまとのこ)	Naoki Murata	Sayuri Ohba	Kyotaka Ohata	June 4, 2024
10	"Love"; Transliteration: "Daisuki" (Japanese: だいすき)	Masahiko Watanabe	Yuka Yamada	Juria Matsumura	June 11, 2024
11	"Bye-Bye?"; Transliteration: "Bai Bai?" (Japanese: ばいばい?)	Kanae Komoda; Yuta Suzuki; Hye Jin Seo	Sayuri Ohba	Shinji Ishihara	June 18, 2024
12	"See You Tomorrow"; Transliteration: "Mata Ashita" (Japanese: またあした)	Masahiko Watanabe	Yoshiko Nakamura	Shinji Ishihara	June 25, 2024
