= A Gentle Noble's Vacation Recommendation =

Japanese light novel series

- First light novel volume cover, featuring Gil (left) and Lizel (right)

穏やか貴族の休暇のすすめ。 (Odayaka Kizoku no Kyūka no Susume)
- Genre: Adventure, fantasy
- Novel series
- Written by: Misaki
- Published by: Shōsetsuka ni Narō
- Original run: January 28, 2014 – present
- Light novel
- Written by: Misaki
- Illustrated by: Sando
- Published by: TO Books
- Imprint: TO Bunko
- Original run: June 9, 2018 – present
- Volumes: 21 + 3 short stories
- Manga
- Written by: Misaki; 8Key (composition)
- Illustrated by: Momochi
- Published by: TO Books
- English publisher: NA: Tokyopop
- Imprint: Corona Comics
- Magazine: Comic Corona
- Original run: December 17, 2018 – present
- Volumes: 15
- Anime television series
- Directed by: Kenta Noda
- Written by: Yōsuke Suzuki
- Music by: Kosuke Yamashita
- Studio: SynergySP (Note: Production Cooperation from Ascencion)
- Licensed by: Crunchyroll: SEA: Plus Media Networks Asia
- Original network: TV Tokyo, BS TV Tokyo, AT-X, Miyatele, TVA, Tulip TV, HAB, TUF, TUY, IBC
- Original run: January 8, 2026 – March 26, 2026
- Episodes: 12
- icon

A Gentle Noble's Vacation Recommendation (Japanese: 穏やか貴族の休暇のすすめ。, Hepburn: Odayaka Kizoku no Kyūka no Susume) is a Japanese light novel series written by Misaki and illustrated by Sando. It began serialization online in January 2014 on the user-generated novel publishing website Shōsetsuka ni Narō. It was later acquired by TO Books, who have published twenty-one volumes and three short stories since June 2018. A manga adaptation with composition by 8Key and art by Momochi has been serialized online via TO Books' Nico Nico Seiga-based Comic Corona manga service since December 2018 and has been collected in fifteen tankōbon volumes. The manga is licensed in North America by Tokyopop. An anime television series adaptation produced by SynergySP aired from January to March 2026.

== Premise ==
Unsure how, but knowing it to be true, Lizel finds himself in another world. A noble in his own world, Lizel has no experience defending himself or understanding commoner life; to this end, he seeks the help of Gil, asking him to be his bodyguard. While this world is similar to his own, he doesn't know what dangers and laws might bring trouble.

Can Lizel make it back to his world? Who knows? All that matters to Lizel is treating his displacement like a vacation from his noble duties.

== Characters ==
Lizel (リゼル, Rizeru)
Voiced by: Soma Saito
Gil (ジル, Jiru)
Voiced by: Yūichirō Umehara
Eleven (イレヴン, Irevun)
Voiced by: Tetsuya Kakihara
Stud (スタッド, Sutaddo)
Voiced by: Jun Fukuyama
Judge (ジャッジ, Jajji)
Voiced by: Daiki Yamashita
Ray (レイ)
Voiced by: Kohsuke Toriumi
Shadow (シャドウ, Shadō)
Voiced by: Hiroki Yasumoto
Insigh (インサイ, Insai)
Voiced by: Kenji Hamada

== Media ==
=== Light novel ===
Written by Misaki, A Gentle Noble's Vacation Recommendation began serialization online on the user-generated novel publishing website Shōsetsuka ni Narō on January 28, 2014. It was later acquired by TO Books who began publishing it with illustrations by Sando under their TO Bunko light novel imprint on June 9, 2018. Twenty-one volumes and three short stories have been released as of April 2026.

No.	Release date	ISBN
1	June 9, 2018	978-4-8647-2701-3
2	October 10, 2018	978-4-8647-2743-3
3	December 10, 2018	978-4-8647-2760-0
4	March 9, 2019	978-4-8647-2787-7
5	June 10, 2019	978-4-8647-2816-4
6	August 10, 2019	978-4-8647-2838-6
7	December 10, 2019	978-4-8647-2864-5
8	March 10, 2020	978-4-8647-2937-6
9	June 10, 2020	978-4-8669-9004-0
10	September 10, 2020	978-4-8669-9036-1
11	December 10, 2020	978-4-8669-9091-0
12	April 10, 2021	978-4-8669-9134-4
SS1	June 10, 2021	978-4-8669-9230-3
13	September 18, 2021	978-4-8669-9299-0
14	December 10, 2021	978-4-8669-9374-4
15	April 20, 2022	978-4-8669-9447-5
16	July 9, 2022	978-4-8669-9557-1
SS2	December 10, 2022	978-4-8669-9719-3
17	April 20, 2023	978-4-8669-9772-8
18	April 15, 2024	978-4-8679-4148-5
19	October 15, 2024	978-4-8679-4339-7
20	April 15, 2025	978-4-8679-4542-1
SS3	January 10, 2026	978-4-8679-4821-7
21	April 10, 2026	978-4-8679-4958-0

=== Manga ===
A manga adaptation with composition by 8Key and art by Momochi began serialization on TO Books' Nico Nico Seiga-based Comic Corona manga service on December 17, 2018. The manga's chapters have been compiled into fifteen tankōbon volumes as of April 2026.

During their New York Comic-Con 2019 panel, Tokyopop announced that they licensed the manga adaptation for English publication.

No.	Original release date	Original ISBN	North American release date	North American ISBN
1	June 1, 2019	978-4-8647-2819-5	August 25, 2020	978-1-42-786333-1
2	November 15, 2019	978-4-8647-2875-1	January 19, 2021	978-1-42-786667-7
3	May 25, 2020	978-4-8647-2989-5	June 8, 2021	978-1-42-786751-3
4	November 14, 2020	978-4-8669-9082-8	September 14, 2021	978-1-42-786844-2
5	June 1, 2021	978-4-8669-9233-4	June 7, 2022	978-1-42-787120-6
6	December 1, 2021	978-4-8669-9373-7	February 21, 2023	978-1-42-787257-9
7	July 15, 2022	978-4-8669-9562-5	November 28, 2023	978-1-42-787407-8
8	December 15, 2022	978-4-8669-9724-7	August 27, 2024	978-1-42-787509-9
9	June 15, 2023	978-4-8669-9872-5	October 22, 2024	978-1-42-787551-8
10	April 15, 2024	978-4-8679-4152-2	January 28, 2025	978-1-4278-8163-2
11	October 15, 2024	978-4-8679-4331-1	—	—
12	April 15, 2025	978-4-8679-4536-0	—	—
13	October 10, 2025	978-4-8679-4721-0	—	—
14	January 10, 2026	978-4-8679-4816-3	—	—
15	April 10, 2026	978-4-8679-4938-2	—	—
16	December 10, 2026	978-4-8685-4217-9	—	—

=== Stage play ===
A stage play adaptation ran at CBGK Shibugeki in Tokyo between April 6–10, 2022.

A second stage play with a new cast ran at Theater Alpha Tokyo between January 18–22, 2023.

=== Anime ===
An anime television series adaptation was announced on October 9, 2024. It is produced by SynergySP (in cooperation with Ascension) and directed by Kenta Noda, with scripts written by Yōsuke Suzuki, character designs by Akito Fujiwara, and music composed by Kosuke Yamashita. The series aired from January 8, 2026, to March 26, 2026, on TV Tokyo and other networks. (Note: TV Tokyo listed the series premiere on January 7 at 24:00, which is effectively January 8 at midnight JST.) The opening theme song is "Gypso", performed by Hikaru Makishima, while the ending theme song is "Ussura" (うっすら, Faint), performed by Hina Suguta. Crunchyroll is streaming the series. Plus Media Networks Asia licensed the series in Southeast Asia and broadcasts it on Aniplus Asia.

==== Episodes ====
No.	Title	Directed by (Note: Production staff information is taken from the ending credits of each episode.)	Written by	Storyboarded by	Original release date
1	"A Vacation Recommendation"; Transliteration: "Kyūka no Susume" (Japanese: 休暇のすすめ)	Kenta Nōda	Yōsuke Suzuki	Kenta Nōda	January 8, 2026
The noble Lizel awakens in an unfamiliar city in an unfamiliar world. After selling his sword for funds he decides he needs a companion; someone intelligent, moral and physically capable. He encounters an adventurer named Gil who reveals he is a solo B Rank adventurer. As Lizel does not realise this makes Gil very famous Gil concludes Lizel is an ignorant airhead. Their conversation reveals the kingdom has three cities; Royal Capital Parteda, merchant city Marcade, and mining city Kavana. Marcade and Kavana are recovering after a war between themselves and Parteda is home to nobles and adventurers. Despite knowing he is being manipulated Gil agrees to be Lizel's bodyguard. Lizel reveals in his original world he is a Royal Chancellor. As sorcery exists in his world and magic exists in this one Lizel is certain his King will eventually summon him home, so he decides to treat his current situation like a vacation, starting with becoming an adventurer. Guild employee Stud is suspicious of Lizel, since nobles cannot legally become adventurers, but as he can't prove Lizel is noble he registers him as an F Rank. Another adventurer insults Gil for refusing to join his party, so Lizel antagonises him into attacking, before Gil defeats him. Stud is confused by Lizel's behaviour. Gil is likewise confused why Lizel was so upset to hear him being insulted.
2	"An Adventurer's Debut"; Transliteration: "Bōken-sha Kotohajime" (Japanese: 冒険者事始め)	Kazuki Koja	Yōsuke Suzuki	Kenta Nōda	January 15, 2026
Gil learns Lizel's sorcery lets him summon guns. Lizel is intrigued by a newly discovered labyrinth. Gil and Stud explain the first to clear the labyrinth always get a huge reward, but this labyrinth contains puzzles. Lizel solves the first puzzle after glancing at an adventurer's notes and gives the man a hint. It is revealed the puzzle was in a language from his original world, worrying him that he might still be in his own world in either the past or the future. They go relic hunting in another labyrinth and find two teddy bears. The adventurer, Ein, reveals his party solved the puzzle and after some negotiating Lizel agrees to solve the remaining puzzles and let them have the fame of clearing the labyrinth, as long as he gets half the reward. Stud introduces them to the quest sponsor who received the teddy bears; Ray, Viscount in charge of the Military Police. Ray decides they should be friends. Ein and his party clear the labyrinth and pay Lizel his reward. Lizel asks why Gil has stayed a B Rank for so long and Gil admits at A Rank he would be expected to take special requests from nobles. With their contract expired Lizel tries to pay Gil what he owes but Gil gives it back and decides to keep guarding him.
3	"A Letter from Ray"; Transliteration: "Rei Kara no Tegami" (Japanese: レイからの手紙)	Kazuki Koja	Yōsuke Suzuki	Shion	January 22, 2026
Gil and Liz form a party, shocking other adventurers Gil is no longer a lone adventurer. Ray invites them to his home to see his collection of relics. Liz is amazed by the artwork which depicts real historical events, almost like the labyrinth's memories. One even shows Gil beheading a dragon. Ray gives Liz a letter of introduction for if he ever visits Marcade. Liz visits the appraiser, Judge, who bought his sword and asks to sell an hourglass relic that measures 3 minutes with perfect accuracy, even if knocked over or shaken about. Judge reveals the main market for labyrinth paintings is in Marcade. As he is planning to visit his grandfather in Marcade, Judge invites Gil and Liz to be his guards for the trip. Stud is suspicious of this, with Liz suspecting he will miss him. Thugs try to pick on Liz for teaming up with Gil, but Stud angrily defeats them with ice magic for interrupting their conversation. Liz wonders if Stud might actually have a crush. They set off on the five day journey to Marcade but are attacked by Green Hyenas which Liz kills. Judge wonders how much he might get for a painting of Liz firing his guns.
4	"Marcade Arrives"; Transliteration: "Marukeido, Tōchaku" (Japanese: マルケイド、到着)	Shunji Yoshida	Yōsuke Suzuki	Hiroki Itai	January 29, 2026
As they approach Marcade Judge explains the city was made prosperous by a past merchant who became influential enough to replace the previous lord. The current lord is that merchant's grandson, but unlike his beloved grandfather he rarely appears in public. A thug tries to stab Liz in the back, claiming he must be the unseen lord of Marcade who ruined his business. Liz insists on antagonising the man, exposing him as a shady merchant who deserved to lose his business. The police arrest the man and Liz reveals he antagonised him on purpose to draw people's attention. He then locates the unseen lord Shadow in the crowd and presents Ray's letter of introduction. Shadow is suspicious the envelope contains a warning from Ray not to make Liz an enemy. After a short conversation Shadow confirms Liz is certainly intelligent enough to not want as an enemy. Liz is confident he annoyed Shadow enough to be memorable. He is also surprised he didn't notice Shadow's guard lurking nearby, whom Gil assures him was very dangerous. They meet with Judge and the police from earlier who claim they need his statement of what happened. Due to the late hour Liz deduces someone is pressuring the police to end the matter quickly. The police admit even if it was mistaken identity, it was still an attempted attack on their lord, so they were just making sure the matter was fully dealt with quietly.
5	"Equals"; Transliteration: "Taitōna Sonzai" (Japanese: 対等な存在)	Masayuki Iimura	Yōsuke Suzuki	Kenta Nōda	February 5, 2026
Liz learns of a public auction and decides to look at the books in case any are labyrinth relics. Beforehand Liz visits book shops for books on relics and artefacts. At the auction Liz is amused a labyrinth painting is sold showing Ein struggling to solve a puzzle. Liz ends up buying a labyrinth strategy guide for the Crystal Ruins Labyrinth. Shadow is disappointed his men report Liz doing nothing suspicious other than visiting Marcade as a tourist. Liz notices the guide shows a room in the crystal ruins that isn't on the official maps sold by the guild, so there is a chance it has never been discovered and may still contain relics. Gil agrees to go hoping there will be a strong monster to fight. Entering the ruins they locate the room but find only a map leading them to a forest they decide to show to Judge. As predicted, looting the map activates a trap to a crystal dragon Gil is excited to fight. Later, Liz admits he is often confused interacting with Gil as he rarely had anyone he considered an equal in his original world. This statement confuses Gil. Meanwhile, in his original world, the King learns Liz has disappeared and decides to search for him personally, upsetting his advisers as it leaves the country temporarily without a king.
6	"Judge's Grandfather"; Transliteration: "Jajji no Sofu" (Japanese: ジャッジの祖父)	Kazuki Koja	Yōsuke Suzuki	Kenta Nōda & Kazuki Koja	February 12, 2026 (Note: This episode aired at 12:10 a.m. JST, 10 minutes after the regular air time on TV Tokyo.)
Liz chooses to share the hidden room location with the Guild so the official map can be updated and other adventurers can explore it. As proof he provides a dragon scale for Layla, the Guild secretary. As he is rank F Layla offers him a promotion exam, which he declines, sensing somehow that it would disappoint Ray. They visit Judge and his grandfather, Insigh. As it was Insigh who gave Gil his legendary sword years ago, based on his instinct it would be perfect for Gil, Liz asks if he has any swords suitable for him. Insigh advises he stick to guns, which require fine mana control but no physical skills, perfect for a non-warrior like Liz. Liz gives Insigh a map he found of the tunnels beneath Marcade and asks he give it to Shadow, whom he is certain Insigh knows personally. He also asks him to sell the rest of his dragon scales, both for the money and because their sale will convince adventurers the secret room is genuine. They begin their return journey home but while camping for the night they are attacked by members of the Forky Bandits, having drawn their attention at the Guild. After killing them Judge is glad Liz is alright.
7	"The Night of the Promotion"; Transliteration: "Ranku Appu no Yoru ni" (Japanese: ランクアップの夜に)	Chiyako Nakamura	Yōsuke Suzuki	Kenta Nōda	February 19, 2026
Liz reports the Forky Gang to Stud, who has had trouble tracking them as they have no headquarters. As Liz helped slay a dragon Stud promotes him to E rank. C rank adventurer Eleven, a snake beastman, asks to join their party but is rejected for being too obviously suspicious. Stud agrees as Eleven has a history of dishonesty and barely working. While celebrating his promotion everyone is surprised Liz doesn't drink, claiming his personality reverses when drunk. Stud dislikes that Liz and Judge shared a bed, so he asks to share Liz's bed too. Stud kills an assassin who shot an arrow at Liz. Stud recalls living in the slums as a child-assassin until he was taken in by the guild-master and told he didn't have to kill anymore. Liz and Gil both wonder why the Forky Gang keep targeting Liz with attacks that will obviously fail and get their men killed. Eleven tries again but is rejected for admitting he wants to share their fame without working. Liz accepts a job to donate mana to recharge a weather projection device for actors while they perform in the city, every night for two weeks. Ray visits and is amused by the tale of Liz tricking Shadow into paying for dinner. He also warns them about the Forky Gang as well.
8	"The Midday Attack"; Transliteration: "Mahiru no Shūgeki" (Japanese: 真昼の襲撃)	Shunji Yoshida	Yōsuke Suzuki	Minoru Yamaoka	February 26, 2026
When the actor's violinist is injured Liz volunteers to replace him. Gil foils another Forky archer shooting at Liz on stage. Liz decides to chat with Eleven, having figured out Eleven is the anonymous boss of the Forky gang. Eleven reminisces he has always craved excitement, teaching himself to fight by killing monsters. After killing a bandit leader the surviving bandits asked him to become their boss, which he accepted and gave the gang a name, which the public misinterpreted as "Forky". After targeting Gil and Liz and almost dying Eleven became obsessed with them. When Liz rejected him he decided to provoke Liz as much as possible with constant attacks. After the play, Eleven asks to join their party again and is surprised Liz knew he was the Forky gang's boss the first time they met, Forky obviously being a misinterpreted reference to his forked snake-beastman tongue. Believing Liz is looking down on him, Eleven tries to kill him but has his wrist broken by Gil. Liz points out Eleven has spent his life misinterpreting fear as excitement, but has probably never felt true fear before. Suddenly instinctively terrified of Liz, Eleven surrenders. Judge finds three labyrinth relics have disappeared from his shop, likely a retaliation by the Merchant's Guild for picking a fight with them.
9	"Judge's Problem"; Transliteration: "Jajji no Toraburu" (Japanese: ジャッジのトラブル)	Masayuki Iimura	Yōsuke Suzuki	Jūni Kashiwagi	March 5, 2026
Liz visits Judge and can tell something is wrong. Still hoping to be let in their party, Eleven reveals the temporary shopkeeper the Merchant Guild supplied to watch Judge's shop while he was in Marcade stole three relics, and the Guild have accused Judge of lying about it. Curious, Liz deliberately poisons himself with Eleven's venom, so Eleven quickly cures him. Surprised Liz trusted him enough to save his life, Eleven blames Gil for teaching Liz bad habits. Eleven confirms Judge's relics are not yet on the black market, but Judge is bravely submitting complaints every day hoping someone will believe him. Liz accepts a quest hunting magic resistant golems in Box Cavern Labyrinth. Eleven is worried but Gil is sure Liz is up to something. Liz defeats a golem because his magic bullets, rather than hitting the golem so it can absorb the magic, pass through it doing only physical damage, destroying it. While waiting for the coach back to town Liz shares sweets Eleven gave him with other adventurers, making Eleven lose his temper, for which Gil punishes him. Liz apologises to Eleven and promises to be more considerate of his feelings, making Eleven smile.
10	"Eleven's Request"; Transliteration: "Irevun no Negai" (Japanese: イレヴンの願い)	Kazuki Koja	Yōsuke Suzuki	Daigo Kinoshita & Kenta Nōda	March 12, 2026
Stud passes Liz information he asked for. Liz, Gil and Eleven capture a certain adventurer who works with the guild employee that stole Judge's relics. As he couldn't sell them himself the employee had the adventurers claim they looted them from a labyrinth and sell them to the guild. It was thanks to Stud's information that Liz identified the guilty adventurers. After being threatened by Eleven the adventurer party confess to their partnership with the employee. The Guild-master publicly apologises after finding many relics in their vaults were stolen from local merchants, including the three belonging to Judge. The adventurers and the employee are arrested and the relics returned. Liz quietly arranges for Insigh to learn about what happened. Gil suspects if Insigh becomes angry enough he might cancel his membership and start his own guild in Marcade, which would be devastating for the Merchant Guild. Later, Liz spots one of Eleven's bandits secretly guarding him and from him learns Eleven's recent change in attitude seems genuine. A police officer invites Liz to meet someone important. Liz asks Eleven why he wants to join the party. Thinking about it, Eleven admits he just wants to stay with Liz, so Liz finally lets him join.
11	"Welcome to the Party"; Transliteration: "Pāti e Yōkoso" (Japanese: パーティへようこそ)	Shunji Yoshida	Yōsuke Suzuki	Shinobu Sasaki	March 19, 2026
Liz visits Ray and suggests that the corrupt guild employee might just be the anonymous, red-haired leader of the Forky gang. Eleven claims to be only a member of the gang now loyal to Liz and willing to give up the entire Forky Gang to the authorities. Ray knows Liz is lying but decides to show leniency towards Eleven in exchange for arresting the entire gang. With the gang gone, Eleven joins Liz's party with a clean slate. Stud is unhappy but accepts Liz's decision. Judge is also nervous around Eleven yet Liz is somehow convinced Judge and Eleven will be good friends. Liz asks Judge for better weapons for Eleven and luckily Judge already owns a set of anti-magic knives that meet Eleven's long list of requirements. To test them out Liz accepts a quest to capture water elementals alive. After figuring out how to contain them Eleven defeats the boss fire elemental, which explodes on death. Gil and Eleven both protect Liz while Eleven is surprised Liz protected his red hair from being burned.
12	"A Country Without Lizel"; Transliteration: "Rizeru no Inai Kuni" (Japanese: リゼルのいない国)	Kenta Nōda	Yōsuke Suzuki	Kenta Nōda	March 26, 2026
Liz hears a bell no one else can. Ray is scolded for arresting the Forky Gang with guards instead of knights, but Ray reasons he couldn't involve knights without admitting he got help from Eleven. He is also annoyed people keep mentioning marriage, and insists he would only remarry if he found an even greater woman than his first wife, or if Liz were female. Insigh receives enough information about the Merchant's guild from Liz that he could have the guild closed down if he chose. Liz accepts a job to help make healing potions. Medi the apothecary has an instant crush on Liz, making Gil and Eleven wary. As Gil is strong enough to crush magic stones by himself, Medi gives extra work to Liz doing paperwork and sends Eleven to handle deliveries. Eleven wonders what kind of woman Liz might prefer and surprisingly Liz admits there is someone special to him. Liz hears the bell again and a portal opens showing the King from Liz's world, and his father. Having located Liz they are glad he is alright and enjoying himself but admit it will be some time before they are capable of bringing him home. The King insists the kingdom is poorer without Liz and wants him to come home soon.

== Reception ==
By October 2024, the series has over 1.5 million copies in circulation.

== See also ==
- The Strongest Tank's Labyrinth Raids, another light novel series illustrated by Sando
